= Meanings of minor-planet names: 60001–61000 =

As minor planet discoveries are confirmed, they are given a permanent number by the IAU's Minor Planet Center (MPC), and the discoverers can then submit names for them, following the IAU's naming conventions. The list below concerns those minor planets in the specified number-range that have received names, and explains the meanings of those names.

Official naming citations of newly named small Solar System bodies are approved and published in a bulletin by IAU's Working Group for Small Bodies Nomenclature (WGSBN). Before May 2021, citations were published in MPC's Minor Planet Circulars for many decades. Recent citations can also be found on the JPL Small-Body Database (SBDB). Until his death in 2016, German astronomer Lutz D. Schmadel compiled these citations into the Dictionary of Minor Planet Names (DMP) and regularly updated the collection.

Based on Paul Herget's The Names of the Minor Planets, Schmadel also researched the unclear origin of numerous asteroids, most of which had been named prior to World War II. This article incorporates text from this source, which is in the public domain: SBDB New namings may only be added to this list below after official publication as the preannouncement of names is condemned. The WGSBN publishes a comprehensive guideline for the naming rules of non-cometary small Solar System bodies.

== 60001–60100 ==
| Named minor planet | Provisional | This minor planet was named for... | Ref · Catalog |
|---|---|---|---|
| 60001 Adélka | 1999 TG_{5} | Adélka Kotková (born 2006), daughter of astronomer Lenka Kotková, who discovered this minor planet | JPL · 60001 |
| 60006 Holgermandel | 1999 TB_{16} | Holger Mandel (born 1957), German astronomer at the Landessternwarte Heidelberg and an honorary member of the Starkenburg-Sternwarte. He is the manager of the LUCIFER project, which has designed two multi-mode instruments for the Large Binocular Telescope. The name was suggested by Erwin Schwab. | JPL · 60006 |
| 60008 Jarda | 1999 TP_{16} | Jaroslav Kotek (born 1956), husband of astronomer Lenka Kotková, who discovered this minor planet. He is a lighting engineer, engaged in the protection of the night-sky from light pollution. He has created a real home for the discoverer and fosters her work in astronomy. | JPL · 60008 |

== 60101–60200 ==
back to top

| Named minor planet | Provisional | This minor planet was named for... | Ref · Catalog |
|---|---|---|---|
| 60148 Seanurban | 1999 US_{1} | Sean E. Urban (born 1962) has made significant advances to astrometry, including completion of the reductions of the 22,000 Astrographic Catalogue plates. These data formed the basis of proper motions for the most important reference star catalogs of the late 20th and early 21st centuries, including Tycho-2 and the UCAC. | JPL · 60148 |
| 60150 Zacharias | 1999 UY_{2} | Norbert (born 1957) and Marion I. (born 1960) Zacharias made important contributions to the link between the radio and optical reference frames and were instrumental in producing the US Naval Observatory's CCD Astrograph Catalog (UCAC) series of reference star catalogs widely used in the astronomical community. | JPL · 60150 |
| 60183 Falcone | 1999 VR_{11} | Giovanni Falcone (1939–1992), an Italian magistrate who fought against organized crime | JPL · 60183 |
| 60186 Las Cruces | 1999 VH_{22} | The US city of Las Cruces, New Mexico. It was founded in 1848 at a site along the Rio Grande river and has grown from a small settlement of about 120 persons to a city that is home to agriculture, industry and New Mexico State University. The clear, dry climate and elevation has attracted a number of astronomical observatories to the area (Src). | JPL · 60186 |

== 60201–60300 ==
back to top

| Named minor planet | Provisional | This minor planet was named for... | Ref · Catalog |
|---|---|---|---|
There are no named minor planets in this number range

== 60301–60400 ==
back to top

| Named minor planet | Provisional | This minor planet was named for... | Ref · Catalog |
|---|---|---|---|
There are no named minor planets in this number range

== 60401–60500 ==
back to top

| Named minor planet | Provisional | This minor planet was named for... | Ref · Catalog |
|---|---|---|---|
| 60406 Albertosuci | 2000 CR_{1} | Alberto Suci (born 1937), an Italian amateur astronomer who is very active in observing the sky and popularizing astronomy in schools and cultural associations. He is the founder of the Astronomy Laboratory in the town of Agliana and the coordinator of the planetarium project in Monsummano Terme. | JPL · 60406 |
| 60423 Chvojen | 2000 CO_{39} | Chvojen, a small Czech village in the Benešov District of central Bohemia. The first settlement there dates back to the Celts. St. Jacob and Philip Church in Chvojen, built in 1217, is known for medieval wall paintings, including Leviathan and Ptolemy Solar System. | JPL · 60423 |

== 60501–60600 ==
back to top

| Named minor planet | Provisional | This minor planet was named for... | Ref · Catalog |
|---|---|---|---|
| 60532 Henson | 2000 EX_{50} | Matthew Alexander Henson (1866–1955) was an American explorer who explored the Arctic alongside Robert Peary on several expeditions, including in 1909 when they may have been the first to reach the geographic North Pole. Among many accolades he was the first African American made a lifetime member of The Explorers Club. | IAU · 60532 |
| 60558 Echeclus | 2000 EC_{98} | Echeclus, centaur who attended Pirithous' wedding, fought against the Lapiths, and was killed by Ampyx | JPL · 60558 |

== 60601–60700 ==
back to top

| Named minor planet | Provisional | This minor planet was named for... | Ref · Catalog |
|---|---|---|---|
| 60609 Kerryprice | 2000 EA_{175} | Kerry Price (born 1939), an accomplished jazz singer who has performed with numerous dixieland jazz bands in southern Michigan over the last 50 years. She is also the music director for a church in suburban Detroit, Michigan. | JPL · 60609 |
| 60614 Tomshea | 2000 EU_{198} | Thomas Shea (1931–1982) was an American ragtime composer best known for his "prairie ragtime" style and the more than 20 "rags" he composed. He was active in ragtime and jazz in the Detroit, Michigan area throughout the 1960s and 1970s. | JPL · 60614 |
| 60622 Pritchet | 2000 FK_{8} | Christopher J. Pritchet (born 1950), a Canadian professor of physics and astronomy at the University of Victoria and a leading authority in the field of observational cosmology, supernovae, galaxy formation and evolution. | JPL · 60622 |
| 60669 Georgpick | 2000 GE_{4} | Georg Alexander Pick (1859–1942), an Austrian mathematician who worked in Prague, is best known for his theorem for determining the area of lattice polygons. In 1911 he invited Albert Einstein to Prague and introduced him to the field of absolute differential calculus, which later helped Einstein to formulate general relativity. | JPL · 60669 |

== 60701–60800 ==
back to top

| Named minor planet | Provisional | This minor planet was named for... | Ref · Catalog |
|---|---|---|---|
There are no named minor planets in this number range

== 60801–60900 ==
back to top

| Named minor planet | Provisional | This minor planet was named for... | Ref · Catalog |
|---|---|---|---|
There are no named minor planets in this number range

== 60901–61000 ==
back to top

| Named minor planet | Provisional | This minor planet was named for... | Ref · Catalog |
|---|---|---|---|
| 60972 Matenko | 2000 KN | Alexander Pravda (born 1961), a Slovak astronomer and friend of the discoverers Adrián Galád and Peter Kolény, with whom he had co-discovered several minor planets until 1998. As a keen observer, he was fascinated by the changes in cometary appearance. His friends were inspired by his wide range of interests, including music and painting. | JPL · 60972 |

back to top

| Preceded by 59,001–60,000 | Meanings of minor-planet names List of minor planets: 60,001–61,000 | Succeeded by 61,001–62,000 |
