= List of minor planets: 60001–61000 =

The following is a partial list of minor planets, running from minor-planet number 60001 through 61000, inclusive. The primary data for this and other partial lists is based on JPL's "Small-Body Orbital Elements" and data available from the Minor Planet Center. Critical list information is also provided by the MPC, unless otherwise specified from Lowell Observatory. A detailed description of the table's columns and additional sources are given on the main page including a complete list of every page in this series, and a statistical break-up on the dynamical classification of minor planets.

Also see the summary list of all named bodies in numerical and alphabetical order, and the corresponding naming citations for the number range of this particular list. New namings may only be added to this list after official publication, as the preannouncement of names is condemned by the Working Group for Small Bodies Nomenclature of the International Astronomical Union.

Near-Earth obj.	MBA (inner)	MBA (outer)	Centaur
Mars-crosser	MBA (middle)	Jupiter trojan	Trans-Neptunian obj.
Unclassified

== 60001–60100 ==
Designation			Discovery			Properties		Ref
Permanent	Provisional	Named after	Date	Site	Discoverer(s)	Category	Diam.	Ref
60001 Adélka	1999 TG_{5}	Adélka	October 4, 1999	Ondřejov	L. Kotková	·	5.9 km	MPC · JPL
60002	1999 TU_{5}	—	October 6, 1999	High Point	D. K. Chesney	AGN	4.8 km	MPC · JPL
60003	1999 TM_{7}	—	October 7, 1999	Višnjan Observatory	K. Korlević, M. Jurić	·	1.8 km	MPC · JPL
60004	1999 TC_{13}	—	October 10, 1999	Oizumi	T. Kobayashi	THM	7.3 km	MPC · JPL
60005	1999 TW_{15}	—	October 7, 1999	Višnjan Observatory	K. Korlević, M. Jurić	·	5.5 km	MPC · JPL
60006 Holgermandel	1999 TB_{16}	Holgermandel	October 13, 1999	Starkenburg Observatory	Starkenburg	TIR	4.7 km	MPC · JPL
60007	1999 TO_{16}	—	October 13, 1999	Ondřejov	P. Kušnirák, P. Pravec	THM	7.0 km	MPC · JPL
60008 Jarda	1999 TP_{16}	Jarda	October 14, 1999	Ondřejov	L. Kotková	·	4.3 km	MPC · JPL
60009	1999 TL_{17}	—	October 15, 1999	Modra	Galád, A., Tóth	·	2.4 km	MPC · JPL
60010	1999 TK_{18}	—	October 13, 1999	Xinglong	SCAP	·	4.7 km	MPC · JPL
60011	1999 TA_{20}	—	October 15, 1999	Xinglong	SCAP	AGN	2.9 km	MPC · JPL
60012	1999 TU_{26}	—	October 3, 1999	Socorro	LINEAR	·	4.8 km	MPC · JPL
60013	1999 TW_{26}	—	October 3, 1999	Socorro	LINEAR	·	5.2 km	MPC · JPL
60014	1999 TW_{27}	—	October 3, 1999	Socorro	LINEAR	NYS	2.3 km	MPC · JPL
60015	1999 TD_{31}	—	October 4, 1999	Socorro	LINEAR	PAD	7.2 km	MPC · JPL
60016	1999 TJ_{33}	—	October 4, 1999	Socorro	LINEAR	EOS	5.4 km	MPC · JPL
60017	1999 TP_{36}	—	October 12, 1999	Anderson Mesa	LONEOS	·	7.7 km	MPC · JPL
60018	1999 TN_{37}	—	October 15, 1999	Anderson Mesa	LONEOS	·	3.1 km	MPC · JPL
60019	1999 TW_{38}	—	October 1, 1999	Catalina	CSS	·	8.8 km	MPC · JPL
60020	1999 TN_{39}	—	October 3, 1999	Catalina	CSS	·	4.7 km	MPC · JPL
60021	1999 TT_{42}	—	October 3, 1999	Kitt Peak	Spacewatch	HYG	5.1 km	MPC · JPL
60022	1999 TX_{44}	—	October 3, 1999	Kitt Peak	Spacewatch	·	5.9 km	MPC · JPL
60023	1999 TC_{45}	—	October 3, 1999	Kitt Peak	Spacewatch	·	6.3 km	MPC · JPL
60024	1999 TW_{47}	—	October 4, 1999	Kitt Peak	Spacewatch	slow	4.8 km	MPC · JPL
60025	1999 TY_{52}	—	October 6, 1999	Kitt Peak	Spacewatch	THM	4.8 km	MPC · JPL
60026	1999 TC_{72}	—	October 9, 1999	Kitt Peak	Spacewatch	HYG	7.3 km	MPC · JPL
60027	1999 TP_{80}	—	October 11, 1999	Kitt Peak	Spacewatch	·	1.7 km	MPC · JPL
60028	1999 TB_{81}	—	October 11, 1999	Kitt Peak	Spacewatch	·	3.4 km	MPC · JPL
60029	1999 TM_{88}	—	October 2, 1999	Socorro	LINEAR	HYG	7.8 km	MPC · JPL
60030	1999 TE_{89}	—	October 2, 1999	Socorro	LINEAR	PAD	5.0 km	MPC · JPL
60031	1999 TH_{89}	—	October 2, 1999	Socorro	LINEAR	·	5.7 km	MPC · JPL
60032	1999 TJ_{92}	—	October 2, 1999	Socorro	LINEAR	·	5.6 km	MPC · JPL
60033	1999 TV_{92}	—	October 2, 1999	Socorro	LINEAR	·	3.1 km	MPC · JPL
60034	1999 TX_{92}	—	October 2, 1999	Socorro	LINEAR	·	2.0 km	MPC · JPL
60035	1999 TO_{93}	—	October 2, 1999	Socorro	LINEAR	(5)	3.4 km	MPC · JPL
60036	1999 TD_{94}	—	October 2, 1999	Socorro	LINEAR	HYG	9.1 km	MPC · JPL
60037	1999 TH_{94}	—	October 2, 1999	Socorro	LINEAR	·	1.6 km	MPC · JPL
60038	1999 TR_{94}	—	October 2, 1999	Socorro	LINEAR	·	6.6 km	MPC · JPL
60039	1999 TS_{94}	—	October 2, 1999	Socorro	LINEAR	·	1.6 km	MPC · JPL
60040	1999 TK_{96}	—	October 2, 1999	Socorro	LINEAR	WIT	2.8 km	MPC · JPL
60041	1999 TF_{100}	—	October 2, 1999	Socorro	LINEAR	·	5.7 km	MPC · JPL
60042	1999 TF_{102}	—	October 2, 1999	Socorro	LINEAR	ULA · CYB	15 km	MPC · JPL
60043	1999 TT_{102}	—	October 2, 1999	Socorro	LINEAR	THB	5.2 km	MPC · JPL
60044	1999 TA_{103}	—	October 2, 1999	Socorro	LINEAR	·	8.9 km	MPC · JPL
60045	1999 TD_{104}	—	October 3, 1999	Socorro	LINEAR	EUN	3.2 km	MPC · JPL
60046	1999 TL_{104}	—	October 3, 1999	Socorro	LINEAR	·	1.4 km	MPC · JPL
60047	1999 TQ_{104}	—	October 3, 1999	Socorro	LINEAR	EOS	4.7 km	MPC · JPL
60048	1999 TS_{104}	—	October 3, 1999	Socorro	LINEAR	·	3.6 km	MPC · JPL
60049	1999 TW_{105}	—	October 3, 1999	Socorro	LINEAR	·	11 km	MPC · JPL
60050	1999 TJ_{106}	—	October 4, 1999	Socorro	LINEAR	moon	7.2 km	MPC · JPL
60051	1999 TN_{106}	—	October 4, 1999	Socorro	LINEAR	·	9.0 km	MPC · JPL
60052	1999 TM_{107}	—	October 4, 1999	Socorro	LINEAR	EOS	6.7 km	MPC · JPL
60053	1999 TB_{109}	—	October 4, 1999	Socorro	LINEAR	·	8.9 km	MPC · JPL
60054	1999 TF_{110}	—	October 4, 1999	Socorro	LINEAR	·	2.8 km	MPC · JPL
60055	1999 TB_{112}	—	October 4, 1999	Socorro	LINEAR	·	9.5 km	MPC · JPL
60056	1999 TG_{116}	—	October 4, 1999	Socorro	LINEAR	·	5.6 km	MPC · JPL
60057	1999 TZ_{117}	—	October 4, 1999	Socorro	LINEAR	·	12 km	MPC · JPL
60058	1999 TE_{118}	—	October 4, 1999	Socorro	LINEAR	HOF	5.4 km	MPC · JPL
60059	1999 TG_{118}	—	October 4, 1999	Socorro	LINEAR	(2076)	2.0 km	MPC · JPL
60060	1999 TS_{118}	—	October 4, 1999	Socorro	LINEAR	PAD	5.5 km	MPC · JPL
60061	1999 TY_{118}	—	October 4, 1999	Socorro	LINEAR	·	3.5 km	MPC · JPL
60062	1999 TE_{119}	—	October 4, 1999	Socorro	LINEAR	THM · fast	6.6 km	MPC · JPL
60063	1999 TN_{121}	—	October 4, 1999	Socorro	LINEAR	·	4.4 km	MPC · JPL
60064	1999 TG_{123}	—	October 4, 1999	Socorro	LINEAR	KOR	3.1 km	MPC · JPL
60065	1999 TR_{123}	—	October 4, 1999	Socorro	LINEAR	·	9.8 km	MPC · JPL
60066	1999 TM_{124}	—	October 4, 1999	Socorro	LINEAR	THM	5.1 km	MPC · JPL
60067	1999 TH_{126}	—	October 4, 1999	Socorro	LINEAR	·	5.4 km	MPC · JPL
60068	1999 TN_{127}	—	October 4, 1999	Socorro	LINEAR	THM	6.9 km	MPC · JPL
60069	1999 TK_{129}	—	October 6, 1999	Socorro	LINEAR	fast	4.3 km	MPC · JPL
60070	1999 TY_{129}	—	October 6, 1999	Socorro	LINEAR	NYS	1.8 km	MPC · JPL
60071	1999 TY_{131}	—	October 6, 1999	Socorro	LINEAR	KOR	2.4 km	MPC · JPL
60072	1999 TN_{132}	—	October 6, 1999	Socorro	LINEAR	·	2.1 km	MPC · JPL
60073	1999 TQ_{135}	—	October 6, 1999	Socorro	LINEAR	·	4.0 km	MPC · JPL
60074	1999 TV_{137}	—	October 6, 1999	Socorro	LINEAR	·	2.2 km	MPC · JPL
60075	1999 TZ_{142}	—	October 7, 1999	Socorro	LINEAR	·	3.7 km	MPC · JPL
60076	1999 TC_{143}	—	October 7, 1999	Socorro	LINEAR	·	4.4 km	MPC · JPL
60077	1999 TZ_{143}	—	October 7, 1999	Socorro	LINEAR	·	4.3 km	MPC · JPL
60078	1999 TS_{146}	—	October 7, 1999	Socorro	LINEAR	·	4.3 km	MPC · JPL
60079	1999 TB_{147}	—	October 7, 1999	Socorro	LINEAR	EOS	4.9 km	MPC · JPL
60080	1999 TG_{149}	—	October 7, 1999	Socorro	LINEAR	·	8.6 km	MPC · JPL
60081	1999 TV_{149}	—	October 7, 1999	Socorro	LINEAR	·	3.6 km	MPC · JPL
60082	1999 TL_{150}	—	October 7, 1999	Socorro	LINEAR	AGN	3.3 km	MPC · JPL
60083	1999 TG_{151}	—	October 7, 1999	Socorro	LINEAR	·	7.1 km	MPC · JPL
60084	1999 TT_{151}	—	October 7, 1999	Socorro	LINEAR	·	3.2 km	MPC · JPL
60085	1999 TA_{152}	—	October 7, 1999	Socorro	LINEAR	·	6.0 km	MPC · JPL
60086	1999 TC_{152}	—	October 7, 1999	Socorro	LINEAR	V	1.8 km	MPC · JPL
60087	1999 TY_{152}	—	October 7, 1999	Socorro	LINEAR	EOS	3.6 km	MPC · JPL
60088	1999 TR_{153}	—	October 7, 1999	Socorro	LINEAR	·	7.3 km	MPC · JPL
60089	1999 TK_{154}	—	October 7, 1999	Socorro	LINEAR	·	2.7 km	MPC · JPL
60090	1999 TC_{156}	—	October 7, 1999	Socorro	LINEAR	·	1.6 km	MPC · JPL
60091	1999 TG_{156}	—	October 7, 1999	Socorro	LINEAR	·	3.6 km	MPC · JPL
60092	1999 TJ_{157}	—	October 9, 1999	Socorro	LINEAR	·	6.0 km	MPC · JPL
60093	1999 TR_{157}	—	October 9, 1999	Socorro	LINEAR	·	7.3 km	MPC · JPL
60094	1999 TQ_{161}	—	October 9, 1999	Socorro	LINEAR	KOR	3.5 km	MPC · JPL
60095	1999 TX_{162}	—	October 9, 1999	Socorro	LINEAR	·	7.1 km	MPC · JPL
60096	1999 TG_{166}	—	October 10, 1999	Socorro	LINEAR	·	2.1 km	MPC · JPL
60097	1999 TZ_{166}	—	October 10, 1999	Socorro	LINEAR	·	3.0 km	MPC · JPL
60098	1999 TM_{170}	—	October 10, 1999	Socorro	LINEAR	·	5.6 km	MPC · JPL
60099	1999 TW_{173}	—	October 10, 1999	Socorro	LINEAR	·	3.7 km	MPC · JPL
60100	1999 TV_{175}	—	October 10, 1999	Socorro	LINEAR	·	4.4 km	MPC · JPL

== 60101–60200 ==
back to top

Designation			Discovery			Properties		Ref
Permanent	Provisional	Named after	Date	Site	Discoverer(s)	Category	Diam.	Ref
60101	1999 TJ_{176}	—	October 10, 1999	Socorro	LINEAR	·	5.0 km	MPC · JPL
60102	1999 TY_{182}	—	October 11, 1999	Socorro	LINEAR	·	1.7 km	MPC · JPL
60103	1999 TP_{187}	—	October 12, 1999	Socorro	LINEAR	·	12 km	MPC · JPL
60104	1999 TZ_{194}	—	October 12, 1999	Socorro	LINEAR	·	4.0 km	MPC · JPL
60105	1999 TJ_{197}	—	October 12, 1999	Socorro	LINEAR	·	2.6 km	MPC · JPL
60106	1999 TT_{201}	—	October 13, 1999	Socorro	LINEAR	·	5.5 km	MPC · JPL
60107	1999 TY_{201}	—	October 13, 1999	Socorro	LINEAR	CYB	9.4 km	MPC · JPL
60108	1999 TF_{205}	—	October 13, 1999	Socorro	LINEAR	(31811)	5.6 km	MPC · JPL
60109	1999 TO_{212}	—	October 15, 1999	Socorro	LINEAR	HYG	6.8 km	MPC · JPL
60110	1999 TB_{213}	—	October 15, 1999	Socorro	LINEAR	·	4.4 km	MPC · JPL
60111	1999 TL_{213}	—	October 15, 1999	Socorro	LINEAR	EOS	4.5 km	MPC · JPL
60112	1999 TZ_{216}	—	October 15, 1999	Socorro	LINEAR	·	1.8 km	MPC · JPL
60113	1999 TB_{217}	—	October 15, 1999	Socorro	LINEAR	·	3.9 km	MPC · JPL
60114	1999 TD_{222}	—	October 2, 1999	Anderson Mesa	LONEOS	·	3.9 km	MPC · JPL
60115	1999 TK_{222}	—	October 2, 1999	Catalina	CSS	EOS	5.0 km	MPC · JPL
60116	1999 TW_{222}	—	October 2, 1999	Socorro	LINEAR	EOS	6.2 km	MPC · JPL
60117	1999 TZ_{222}	—	October 3, 1999	Catalina	CSS	EOS	6.5 km	MPC · JPL
60118	1999 TQ_{223}	—	October 2, 1999	Socorro	LINEAR	·	1.4 km	MPC · JPL
60119	1999 TU_{223}	—	October 2, 1999	Socorro	LINEAR	JUN	2.4 km	MPC · JPL
60120	1999 TW_{227}	—	October 1, 1999	Kitt Peak	Spacewatch	·	4.7 km	MPC · JPL
60121	1999 TE_{235}	—	October 3, 1999	Catalina	CSS	NYS ·	5.0 km	MPC · JPL
60122	1999 TU_{239}	—	October 4, 1999	Catalina	CSS	EOS	5.8 km	MPC · JPL
60123	1999 TU_{240}	—	October 4, 1999	Catalina	CSS	HYG	8.7 km	MPC · JPL
60124	1999 TG_{243}	—	October 5, 1999	Anderson Mesa	LONEOS	·	6.5 km	MPC · JPL
60125	1999 TW_{246}	—	October 6, 1999	Socorro	LINEAR	·	3.3 km	MPC · JPL
60126	1999 TU_{251}	—	October 7, 1999	Kitt Peak	Spacewatch	·	4.6 km	MPC · JPL
60127	1999 TQ_{254}	—	October 8, 1999	Socorro	LINEAR	·	13 km	MPC · JPL
60128	1999 TS_{254}	—	October 8, 1999	Socorro	LINEAR	·	10 km	MPC · JPL
60129	1999 TG_{256}	—	October 9, 1999	Socorro	LINEAR	·	4.4 km	MPC · JPL
60130	1999 TP_{256}	—	October 9, 1999	Socorro	LINEAR	·	3.8 km	MPC · JPL
60131	1999 TY_{256}	—	October 9, 1999	Socorro	LINEAR	·	6.2 km	MPC · JPL
60132	1999 TN_{259}	—	October 9, 1999	Socorro	LINEAR	THM	7.1 km	MPC · JPL
60133	1999 TM_{266}	—	October 3, 1999	Socorro	LINEAR	·	2.7 km	MPC · JPL
60134	1999 TO_{272}	—	October 3, 1999	Socorro	LINEAR	EOS	4.1 km	MPC · JPL
60135	1999 TS_{279}	—	October 7, 1999	Socorro	LINEAR	THM	8.2 km	MPC · JPL
60136	1999 TV_{279}	—	October 7, 1999	Socorro	LINEAR	THM	9.7 km	MPC · JPL
60137	1999 TC_{280}	—	October 7, 1999	Socorro	LINEAR	THM	7.1 km	MPC · JPL
60138	1999 TV_{280}	—	October 8, 1999	Socorro	LINEAR	NYS	2.4 km	MPC · JPL
60139	1999 TP_{285}	—	October 9, 1999	Socorro	LINEAR	·	1.9 km	MPC · JPL
60140	1999 TA_{288}	—	October 10, 1999	Socorro	LINEAR	·	4.3 km	MPC · JPL
60141	1999 TE_{290}	—	October 10, 1999	Socorro	LINEAR	TIR	7.7 km	MPC · JPL
60142	1999 TS_{290}	—	October 10, 1999	Socorro	LINEAR	VER	9.8 km	MPC · JPL
60143	1999 TV_{292}	—	October 12, 1999	Socorro	LINEAR	·	6.1 km	MPC · JPL
60144	1999 TN_{293}	—	October 12, 1999	Socorro	LINEAR	KON	5.9 km	MPC · JPL
60145	1999 TB_{313}	—	October 8, 1999	Kitt Peak	Spacewatch	·	1.1 km	MPC · JPL
60146	1999 TF_{316}	—	October 10, 1999	Socorro	LINEAR	·	2.2 km	MPC · JPL
60147	1999 TC_{320}	—	October 10, 1999	Socorro	LINEAR	EOS	6.4 km	MPC · JPL
60148 Seanurban	1999 US_{1}	Seanurban	October 16, 1999	Ondřejov	P. Kušnirák, P. Pravec	KOR	2.8 km	MPC · JPL
60149	1999 UC_{2}	—	October 16, 1999	Višnjan Observatory	K. Korlević	KOR	3.5 km	MPC · JPL
60150 Zacharias	1999 UY_{2}	Zacharias	October 19, 1999	Ondřejov	P. Pravec, P. Kušnirák	·	1.3 km	MPC · JPL
60151	1999 UZ_{6}	—	October 29, 1999	Kitt Peak	Spacewatch	·	1.6 km	MPC · JPL
60152	1999 UG_{13}	—	October 29, 1999	Catalina	CSS	EOS · fast	6.6 km	MPC · JPL
60153	1999 UV_{13}	—	October 29, 1999	Catalina	CSS	HYG	9.6 km	MPC · JPL
60154	1999 UB_{14}	—	October 29, 1999	Catalina	CSS	NYS	1.9 km	MPC · JPL
60155	1999 UJ_{17}	—	October 29, 1999	Kitt Peak	Spacewatch	·	7.0 km	MPC · JPL
60156	1999 UK_{18}	—	October 30, 1999	Kitt Peak	Spacewatch	(12739)	3.9 km	MPC · JPL
60157	1999 UT_{23}	—	October 28, 1999	Catalina	CSS	TIR	5.2 km	MPC · JPL
60158	1999 UH_{24}	—	October 28, 1999	Catalina	CSS	·	10 km	MPC · JPL
60159	1999 UL_{24}	—	October 28, 1999	Catalina	CSS	·	4.8 km	MPC · JPL
60160	1999 UQ_{25}	—	October 29, 1999	Catalina	CSS	slow	4.1 km	MPC · JPL
60161	1999 UZ_{25}	—	October 30, 1999	Catalina	CSS	·	1.5 km	MPC · JPL
60162	1999 UE_{26}	—	October 30, 1999	Catalina	CSS	·	7.2 km	MPC · JPL
60163	1999 UE_{28}	—	October 30, 1999	Kitt Peak	Spacewatch	HYG	5.9 km	MPC · JPL
60164	1999 UF_{28}	—	October 30, 1999	Kitt Peak	Spacewatch	·	3.7 km	MPC · JPL
60165	1999 UZ_{30}	—	October 31, 1999	Kitt Peak	Spacewatch	·	7.3 km	MPC · JPL
60166	1999 UC_{31}	—	October 31, 1999	Kitt Peak	Spacewatch	THM	5.4 km	MPC · JPL
60167	1999 UN_{33}	—	October 31, 1999	Kitt Peak	Spacewatch	·	7.5 km	MPC · JPL
60168	1999 UV_{41}	—	October 19, 1999	Socorro	LINEAR	WIT	2.6 km	MPC · JPL
60169	1999 UH_{44}	—	October 29, 1999	Catalina	CSS	·	2.5 km	MPC · JPL
60170	1999 US_{45}	—	October 31, 1999	Catalina	CSS	·	3.1 km	MPC · JPL
60171	1999 UP_{47}	—	October 30, 1999	Catalina	CSS	TEL	4.2 km	MPC · JPL
60172	1999 UY_{48}	—	October 31, 1999	Catalina	CSS	·	7.5 km	MPC · JPL
60173	1999 UV_{50}	—	October 30, 1999	Catalina	CSS	·	5.3 km	MPC · JPL
60174	1999 UV_{56}	—	October 29, 1999	Catalina	CSS	THM	6.2 km	MPC · JPL
60175	1999 VQ_{1}	—	November 3, 1999	Starkenburg Observatory	Starkenburg	·	8.2 km	MPC · JPL
60176	1999 VY_{5}	—	November 5, 1999	Oizumi	T. Kobayashi	·	1.7 km	MPC · JPL
60177	1999 VU_{6}	—	November 8, 1999	Baton Rouge	W. R. Cooney Jr.	·	2.8 km	MPC · JPL
60178	1999 VY_{6}	—	November 8, 1999	Fountain Hills	C. W. Juels	·	3.3 km	MPC · JPL
60179	1999 VE_{7}	—	November 7, 1999	Višnjan Observatory	K. Korlević	·	6.1 km	MPC · JPL
60180	1999 VK_{8}	—	November 8, 1999	Višnjan Observatory	K. Korlević	THM	4.5 km	MPC · JPL
60181	1999 VV_{9}	—	November 9, 1999	Fountain Hills	C. W. Juels	TIR	4.9 km	MPC · JPL
60182	1999 VS_{10}	—	November 9, 1999	Oizumi	T. Kobayashi	V	3.3 km	MPC · JPL
60183 Falcone	1999 VR_{11}	Falcone	November 5, 1999	Monte Agliale	Santangelo, M. M. M.	KOR	3.2 km	MPC · JPL
60184	1999 VM_{16}	—	November 2, 1999	Kitt Peak	Spacewatch	·	2.5 km	MPC · JPL
60185	1999 VY_{21}	—	November 12, 1999	Višnjan Observatory	K. Korlević	·	2.0 km	MPC · JPL
60186 Las Cruces	1999 VH_{22}	Las Cruces	November 13, 1999	Jornada	Dixon, D. S., Stevens, J.	·	13 km	MPC · JPL
60187	1999 VL_{23}	—	November 14, 1999	Fountain Hills	C. W. Juels	·	3.0 km	MPC · JPL
60188	1999 VH_{25}	—	November 13, 1999	Oizumi	T. Kobayashi	NYS	3.4 km	MPC · JPL
60189	1999 VM_{27}	—	November 3, 1999	Catalina	CSS	(5651) · slow	10 km	MPC · JPL
60190	1999 VG_{31}	—	November 3, 1999	Socorro	LINEAR	·	9.2 km	MPC · JPL
60191	1999 VP_{35}	—	November 3, 1999	Socorro	LINEAR	·	2.4 km	MPC · JPL
60192	1999 VU_{42}	—	November 4, 1999	Kitt Peak	Spacewatch	·	1.6 km	MPC · JPL
60193	1999 VJ_{43}	—	November 1, 1999	Catalina	CSS	·	2.2 km	MPC · JPL
60194	1999 VU_{43}	—	November 1, 1999	Catalina	CSS	·	5.4 km	MPC · JPL
60195	1999 VM_{44}	—	November 3, 1999	Catalina	CSS	·	5.9 km	MPC · JPL
60196	1999 VG_{52}	—	November 3, 1999	Socorro	LINEAR	HOF	6.4 km	MPC · JPL
60197	1999 VO_{52}	—	November 3, 1999	Socorro	LINEAR	·	3.5 km	MPC · JPL
60198	1999 VT_{54}	—	November 4, 1999	Socorro	LINEAR	·	4.4 km	MPC · JPL
60199	1999 VF_{56}	—	November 4, 1999	Socorro	LINEAR	MAS	1.7 km	MPC · JPL
60200	1999 VV_{56}	—	November 4, 1999	Socorro	LINEAR	·	5.0 km	MPC · JPL

== 60201–60300 ==
back to top

Designation			Discovery			Properties		Ref
Permanent	Provisional	Named after	Date	Site	Discoverer(s)	Category	Diam.	Ref
60201	1999 VD_{58}	—	November 4, 1999	Socorro	LINEAR	·	3.3 km	MPC · JPL
60202	1999 VU_{58}	—	November 4, 1999	Socorro	LINEAR	·	9.6 km	MPC · JPL
60203	1999 VK_{59}	—	November 4, 1999	Socorro	LINEAR	·	1.3 km	MPC · JPL
60204	1999 VO_{63}	—	November 4, 1999	Socorro	LINEAR	KOR	5.8 km	MPC · JPL
60205	1999 VS_{64}	—	November 4, 1999	Socorro	LINEAR	·	4.9 km	MPC · JPL
60206	1999 VZ_{68}	—	November 4, 1999	Socorro	LINEAR	·	1.4 km	MPC · JPL
60207	1999 VA_{69}	—	November 4, 1999	Socorro	LINEAR	KOR	3.2 km	MPC · JPL
60208	1999 VQ_{72}	—	November 15, 1999	Ondřejov	P. Pravec	HYG · slow	8.8 km	MPC · JPL
60209	1999 VR_{75}	—	November 5, 1999	Kitt Peak	Spacewatch	·	2.2 km	MPC · JPL
60210	1999 VN_{76}	—	November 5, 1999	Kitt Peak	Spacewatch	NYS	2.6 km	MPC · JPL
60211	1999 VX_{77}	—	November 3, 1999	Socorro	LINEAR	·	2.1 km	MPC · JPL
60212	1999 VB_{79}	—	November 4, 1999	Socorro	LINEAR	·	11 km	MPC · JPL
60213	1999 VE_{79}	—	November 4, 1999	Socorro	LINEAR	V	1.5 km	MPC · JPL
60214	1999 VO_{81}	—	November 5, 1999	Socorro	LINEAR	·	5.5 km	MPC · JPL
60215	1999 VQ_{81}	—	November 5, 1999	Socorro	LINEAR	·	3.2 km	MPC · JPL
60216	1999 VG_{82}	—	November 5, 1999	Socorro	LINEAR	·	1.9 km	MPC · JPL
60217	1999 VC_{89}	—	November 4, 1999	Socorro	LINEAR	·	2.0 km	MPC · JPL
60218	1999 VP_{92}	—	November 9, 1999	Socorro	LINEAR	·	7.7 km	MPC · JPL
60219	1999 VY_{93}	—	November 9, 1999	Socorro	LINEAR	·	3.8 km	MPC · JPL
60220	1999 VA_{95}	—	November 9, 1999	Socorro	LINEAR	·	1.9 km	MPC · JPL
60221	1999 VY_{96}	—	November 9, 1999	Socorro	LINEAR	·	4.0 km	MPC · JPL
60222	1999 VB_{115}	—	November 9, 1999	Catalina	CSS	EOS	6.5 km	MPC · JPL
60223	1999 VD_{118}	—	November 9, 1999	Kitt Peak	Spacewatch	KOR	2.8 km	MPC · JPL
60224	1999 VE_{118}	—	November 9, 1999	Kitt Peak	Spacewatch	·	2.4 km	MPC · JPL
60225	1999 VK_{122}	—	November 4, 1999	Kitt Peak	Spacewatch	·	1.2 km	MPC · JPL
60226	1999 VF_{126}	—	November 9, 1999	Kitt Peak	Spacewatch	·	3.2 km	MPC · JPL
60227	1999 VD_{133}	—	November 10, 1999	Kitt Peak	Spacewatch	·	4.2 km	MPC · JPL
60228	1999 VL_{145}	—	November 9, 1999	Socorro	LINEAR	EOS	4.4 km	MPC · JPL
60229	1999 VZ_{145}	—	November 12, 1999	Socorro	LINEAR	·	1.4 km	MPC · JPL
60230	1999 VD_{146}	—	November 12, 1999	Socorro	LINEAR	·	4.4 km	MPC · JPL
60231	1999 VK_{148}	—	November 14, 1999	Socorro	LINEAR	·	2.6 km	MPC · JPL
60232	1999 VL_{148}	—	November 14, 1999	Socorro	LINEAR	HIL · 3:2	12 km	MPC · JPL
60233	1999 VZ_{153}	—	November 13, 1999	Catalina	CSS	·	7.0 km	MPC · JPL
60234	1999 VK_{157}	—	November 14, 1999	Socorro	LINEAR	H	1.1 km	MPC · JPL
60235	1999 VO_{163}	—	November 14, 1999	Socorro	LINEAR	SYL · CYB	12 km	MPC · JPL
60236	1999 VH_{165}	—	November 14, 1999	Socorro	LINEAR	·	4.5 km	MPC · JPL
60237	1999 VS_{167}	—	November 14, 1999	Socorro	LINEAR	·	2.3 km	MPC · JPL
60238	1999 VQ_{174}	—	November 1, 1999	Kitt Peak	Spacewatch	·	2.0 km	MPC · JPL
60239	1999 VE_{176}	—	November 2, 1999	Catalina	CSS	·	1.7 km	MPC · JPL
60240	1999 VO_{178}	—	November 6, 1999	Socorro	LINEAR	·	4.6 km	MPC · JPL
60241	1999 VJ_{180}	—	November 6, 1999	Socorro	LINEAR	·	2.0 km	MPC · JPL
60242	1999 VJ_{184}	—	November 15, 1999	Socorro	LINEAR	·	4.3 km	MPC · JPL
60243	1999 VM_{184}	—	November 15, 1999	Socorro	LINEAR	·	3.4 km	MPC · JPL
60244	1999 VN_{186}	—	November 15, 1999	Socorro	LINEAR	·	1.6 km	MPC · JPL
60245	1999 VA_{190}	—	November 15, 1999	Socorro	LINEAR	·	2.2 km	MPC · JPL
60246	1999 VP_{190}	—	November 15, 1999	Socorro	LINEAR	V	1.5 km	MPC · JPL
60247	1999 VW_{193}	—	November 3, 1999	Kitt Peak	Spacewatch	EUN	2.6 km	MPC · JPL
60248	1999 VW_{197}	—	November 3, 1999	Catalina	CSS	·	4.3 km	MPC · JPL
60249	1999 VC_{199}	—	November 4, 1999	Anderson Mesa	LONEOS	URS	12 km	MPC · JPL
60250	1999 VO_{200}	—	November 6, 1999	Catalina	CSS	·	8.6 km	MPC · JPL
60251	1999 VO_{202}	—	November 5, 1999	Kitt Peak	Spacewatch	TIR	6.1 km	MPC · JPL
60252	1999 VP_{204}	—	November 9, 1999	Kitt Peak	Spacewatch	·	2.0 km	MPC · JPL
60253	1999 VB_{225}	—	November 5, 1999	Socorro	LINEAR	HYG	7.1 km	MPC · JPL
60254	1999 VO_{226}	—	November 13, 1999	Catalina	CSS	·	11 km	MPC · JPL
60255	1999 WO_{4}	—	November 28, 1999	Oizumi	T. Kobayashi	·	2.2 km	MPC · JPL
60256	1999 WB_{20}	—	November 16, 1999	Catalina	CSS	VER	7.3 km	MPC · JPL
60257	1999 WB_{25}	—	November 28, 1999	Kitt Peak	Spacewatch	L4	10 km	MPC · JPL
60258	1999 XL_{4}	—	December 4, 1999	Catalina	CSS	HYG	6.7 km	MPC · JPL
60259	1999 XY_{5}	—	December 4, 1999	Catalina	CSS	·	2.4 km	MPC · JPL
60260	1999 XO_{6}	—	December 4, 1999	Catalina	CSS	V · slow	1.5 km	MPC · JPL
60261	1999 XC_{14}	—	December 5, 1999	Socorro	LINEAR	·	5.8 km	MPC · JPL
60262	1999 XB_{18}	—	December 3, 1999	Socorro	LINEAR	EOS	6.2 km	MPC · JPL
60263	1999 XB_{20}	—	December 5, 1999	Socorro	LINEAR	EUN	4.3 km	MPC · JPL
60264	1999 XX_{21}	—	December 5, 1999	Socorro	LINEAR	·	3.6 km	MPC · JPL
60265	1999 XY_{22}	—	December 6, 1999	Socorro	LINEAR	·	11 km	MPC · JPL
60266	1999 XB_{25}	—	December 6, 1999	Socorro	LINEAR	CYB	13 km	MPC · JPL
60267	1999 XF_{27}	—	December 6, 1999	Socorro	LINEAR	EOS	5.4 km	MPC · JPL
60268	1999 XU_{38}	—	December 6, 1999	Farpoint	G. Hug, G. Bell	·	11 km	MPC · JPL
60269	1999 XN_{46}	—	December 7, 1999	Socorro	LINEAR	V	1.3 km	MPC · JPL
60270	1999 XJ_{54}	—	December 7, 1999	Socorro	LINEAR	·	1.8 km	MPC · JPL
60271	1999 XN_{56}	—	December 7, 1999	Socorro	LINEAR	·	1.4 km	MPC · JPL
60272	1999 XT_{64}	—	December 7, 1999	Socorro	LINEAR	·	1.4 km	MPC · JPL
60273	1999 XM_{70}	—	December 7, 1999	Socorro	LINEAR	·	2.9 km	MPC · JPL
60274	1999 XJ_{82}	—	December 7, 1999	Socorro	LINEAR	·	2.7 km	MPC · JPL
60275	1999 XH_{85}	—	December 7, 1999	Socorro	LINEAR	·	3.5 km	MPC · JPL
60276	1999 XL_{85}	—	December 7, 1999	Socorro	LINEAR	·	1.9 km	MPC · JPL
60277	1999 XH_{89}	—	December 7, 1999	Socorro	LINEAR	·	3.2 km	MPC · JPL
60278	1999 XE_{91}	—	December 7, 1999	Socorro	LINEAR	·	3.0 km	MPC · JPL
60279	1999 XQ_{92}	—	December 7, 1999	Socorro	LINEAR	·	3.1 km	MPC · JPL
60280	1999 XZ_{94}	—	December 7, 1999	Socorro	LINEAR	·	3.7 km	MPC · JPL
60281	1999 XF_{95}	—	December 7, 1999	Oizumi	T. Kobayashi	NYS	2.6 km	MPC · JPL
60282	1999 XK_{96}	—	December 7, 1999	Socorro	LINEAR	NYS	3.3 km	MPC · JPL
60283	1999 XB_{101}	—	December 7, 1999	Socorro	LINEAR	·	2.9 km	MPC · JPL
60284	1999 XY_{102}	—	December 7, 1999	Socorro	LINEAR	EUN	3.1 km	MPC · JPL
60285	1999 XR_{106}	—	December 4, 1999	Catalina	CSS	V	2.7 km	MPC · JPL
60286	1999 XG_{107}	—	December 4, 1999	Catalina	CSS	·	6.3 km	MPC · JPL
60287	1999 XV_{111}	—	December 7, 1999	Socorro	LINEAR	·	1.9 km	MPC · JPL
60288	1999 XW_{114}	—	December 11, 1999	Socorro	LINEAR	·	14 km	MPC · JPL
60289	1999 XS_{125}	—	December 7, 1999	Catalina	CSS	EOS	4.6 km	MPC · JPL
60290	1999 XJ_{127}	—	December 9, 1999	Fountain Hills	C. W. Juels	·	4.5 km	MPC · JPL
60291	1999 XV_{140}	—	December 2, 1999	Kitt Peak	Spacewatch	·	4.2 km	MPC · JPL
60292	1999 XO_{143}	—	December 14, 1999	Socorro	LINEAR	·	2.7 km	MPC · JPL
60293	1999 XZ_{148}	—	December 8, 1999	Kitt Peak	Spacewatch	·	2.1 km	MPC · JPL
60294	1999 XZ_{152}	—	December 7, 1999	Socorro	LINEAR	V	1.0 km	MPC · JPL
60295	1999 XL_{154}	—	December 8, 1999	Socorro	LINEAR	·	2.6 km	MPC · JPL
60296	1999 XF_{156}	—	December 8, 1999	Socorro	LINEAR	·	2.8 km	MPC · JPL
60297	1999 XD_{157}	—	December 8, 1999	Socorro	LINEAR	·	2.3 km	MPC · JPL
60298	1999 XF_{168}	—	December 10, 1999	Socorro	LINEAR	V	2.3 km	MPC · JPL
60299	1999 XX_{174}	—	December 10, 1999	Socorro	LINEAR	·	4.9 km	MPC · JPL
60300	1999 XV_{176}	—	December 10, 1999	Socorro	LINEAR	PHO	4.9 km	MPC · JPL

== 60301–60400 ==
back to top

Designation			Discovery			Properties		Ref
Permanent	Provisional	Named after	Date	Site	Discoverer(s)	Category	Diam.	Ref
60301	1999 XL_{178}	—	December 10, 1999	Socorro	LINEAR	·	3.6 km	MPC · JPL
60302	1999 XM_{180}	—	December 10, 1999	Socorro	LINEAR	·	2.2 km	MPC · JPL
60303	1999 XW_{184}	—	December 12, 1999	Socorro	LINEAR	·	7.5 km	MPC · JPL
60304	1999 XT_{189}	—	December 12, 1999	Socorro	LINEAR	·	1.5 km	MPC · JPL
60305	1999 XU_{190}	—	December 12, 1999	Socorro	LINEAR	ERI	6.1 km	MPC · JPL
60306	1999 XW_{190}	—	December 12, 1999	Socorro	LINEAR	EOS	5.1 km	MPC · JPL
60307	1999 XR_{193}	—	December 12, 1999	Socorro	LINEAR	·	6.7 km	MPC · JPL
60308	1999 XH_{204}	—	December 12, 1999	Socorro	LINEAR	·	1.6 km	MPC · JPL
60309	1999 XZ_{206}	—	December 12, 1999	Socorro	LINEAR	·	2.7 km	MPC · JPL
60310	1999 XD_{215}	—	December 14, 1999	Socorro	LINEAR	EUN · slow	3.3 km	MPC · JPL
60311	1999 XS_{216}	—	December 13, 1999	Kitt Peak	Spacewatch	V	1.6 km	MPC · JPL
60312	1999 XM_{218}	—	December 13, 1999	Kitt Peak	Spacewatch	·	1.5 km	MPC · JPL
60313	1999 XW_{218}	—	December 15, 1999	Kitt Peak	Spacewatch	L4	11 km	MPC · JPL
60314	1999 XU_{226}	—	December 14, 1999	Kitt Peak	Spacewatch	·	7.5 km	MPC · JPL
60315	1999 XF_{227}	—	December 15, 1999	Kitt Peak	Spacewatch	·	1.7 km	MPC · JPL
60316	1999 XU_{228}	—	December 14, 1999	Kitt Peak	Spacewatch	(5)	2.9 km	MPC · JPL
60317	1999 XD_{234}	—	December 4, 1999	Anderson Mesa	LONEOS	·	1.8 km	MPC · JPL
60318	1999 XB_{235}	—	December 3, 1999	Anderson Mesa	LONEOS	3:2	10 km	MPC · JPL
60319	1999 XL_{242}	—	December 12, 1999	Socorro	LINEAR	EUN	2.7 km	MPC · JPL
60320	1999 XG_{253}	—	December 12, 1999	Kitt Peak	Spacewatch	·	5.0 km	MPC · JPL
60321	1999 XK_{254}	—	December 12, 1999	Kitt Peak	Spacewatch	·	1.8 km	MPC · JPL
60322	1999 XB_{257}	—	December 7, 1999	Socorro	LINEAR	L4	20 km	MPC · JPL
60323	1999 YC_{8}	—	December 27, 1999	Kitt Peak	Spacewatch	·	2.8 km	MPC · JPL
60324	1999 YX_{10}	—	December 27, 1999	Kitt Peak	Spacewatch	·	2.8 km	MPC · JPL
60325	1999 YQ_{12}	—	December 27, 1999	Kitt Peak	Spacewatch	·	2.5 km	MPC · JPL
60326	1999 YB_{23}	—	December 30, 1999	Anderson Mesa	LONEOS	V	1.7 km	MPC · JPL
60327	2000 AW_{5}	—	January 4, 2000	Kitt Peak	Spacewatch	AGN	2.6 km	MPC · JPL
60328	2000 AH_{7}	—	January 2, 2000	Socorro	LINEAR	L4	20 km	MPC · JPL
60329	2000 AL_{11}	—	January 3, 2000	Socorro	LINEAR	VER	10 km	MPC · JPL
60330	2000 AG_{17}	—	January 3, 2000	Socorro	LINEAR	·	2.7 km	MPC · JPL
60331	2000 AS_{29}	—	January 3, 2000	Socorro	LINEAR	·	3.5 km	MPC · JPL
60332	2000 AJ_{35}	—	January 3, 2000	Socorro	LINEAR	·	2.2 km	MPC · JPL
60333	2000 AY_{40}	—	January 3, 2000	Socorro	LINEAR	·	2.7 km	MPC · JPL
60334	2000 AN_{42}	—	January 3, 2000	Socorro	LINEAR	H	1.8 km	MPC · JPL
60335	2000 AR_{42}	—	January 4, 2000	Socorro	LINEAR	H	1.2 km	MPC · JPL
60336	2000 AK_{46}	—	January 3, 2000	Socorro	LINEAR	·	2.8 km	MPC · JPL
60337	2000 AF_{51}	—	January 3, 2000	Socorro	LINEAR	·	2.7 km	MPC · JPL
60338	2000 AW_{56}	—	January 4, 2000	Socorro	LINEAR	·	2.3 km	MPC · JPL
60339	2000 AP_{62}	—	January 4, 2000	Socorro	LINEAR	·	3.3 km	MPC · JPL
60340	2000 AF_{63}	—	January 4, 2000	Socorro	LINEAR	·	1.8 km	MPC · JPL
60341	2000 AQ_{64}	—	January 4, 2000	Socorro	LINEAR	·	2.9 km	MPC · JPL
60342	2000 AH_{68}	—	January 5, 2000	Socorro	LINEAR	·	1.8 km	MPC · JPL
60343	2000 AY_{72}	—	January 5, 2000	Socorro	LINEAR	NYS	2.7 km	MPC · JPL
60344	2000 AS_{73}	—	January 5, 2000	Socorro	LINEAR	NYS	2.9 km	MPC · JPL
60345	2000 AD_{76}	—	January 5, 2000	Socorro	LINEAR	V	2.0 km	MPC · JPL
60346	2000 AB_{77}	—	January 5, 2000	Socorro	LINEAR	·	5.2 km	MPC · JPL
60347	2000 AD_{78}	—	January 5, 2000	Socorro	LINEAR	·	1.4 km	MPC · JPL
60348	2000 AT_{81}	—	January 5, 2000	Socorro	LINEAR	V	1.7 km	MPC · JPL
60349	2000 AS_{83}	—	January 5, 2000	Socorro	LINEAR	·	4.0 km	MPC · JPL
60350	2000 AC_{86}	—	January 5, 2000	Socorro	LINEAR	·	1.8 km	MPC · JPL
60351	2000 AG_{87}	—	January 5, 2000	Socorro	LINEAR	NYS	3.3 km	MPC · JPL
60352	2000 AC_{88}	—	January 5, 2000	Socorro	LINEAR	·	2.7 km	MPC · JPL
60353	2000 AN_{88}	—	January 5, 2000	Socorro	LINEAR	·	2.0 km	MPC · JPL
60354	2000 AP_{88}	—	January 5, 2000	Socorro	LINEAR	NYS	1.9 km	MPC · JPL
60355	2000 AE_{91}	—	January 5, 2000	Socorro	LINEAR	·	3.8 km	MPC · JPL
60356	2000 AC_{93}	—	January 3, 2000	Socorro	LINEAR	H	1.8 km	MPC · JPL
60357	2000 AG_{96}	—	January 4, 2000	Socorro	LINEAR	·	5.7 km	MPC · JPL
60358	2000 AR_{98}	—	January 5, 2000	Socorro	LINEAR	V	2.8 km	MPC · JPL
60359	2000 AJ_{100}	—	January 5, 2000	Socorro	LINEAR	HYG	9.6 km	MPC · JPL
60360	2000 AN_{100}	—	January 5, 2000	Socorro	LINEAR	·	2.0 km	MPC · JPL
60361	2000 AT_{100}	—	January 5, 2000	Socorro	LINEAR	EOS	3.9 km	MPC · JPL
60362	2000 AU_{103}	—	January 5, 2000	Socorro	LINEAR	EUN	4.4 km	MPC · JPL
60363	2000 AT_{105}	—	January 5, 2000	Socorro	LINEAR	·	4.8 km	MPC · JPL
60364	2000 AE_{108}	—	January 5, 2000	Socorro	LINEAR	AGN	2.8 km	MPC · JPL
60365	2000 AT_{109}	—	January 5, 2000	Socorro	LINEAR	·	1.7 km	MPC · JPL
60366	2000 AX_{114}	—	January 5, 2000	Socorro	LINEAR	·	2.1 km	MPC · JPL
60367	2000 AN_{115}	—	January 5, 2000	Socorro	LINEAR	·	3.4 km	MPC · JPL
60368	2000 AQ_{119}	—	January 5, 2000	Socorro	LINEAR	EMA	8.2 km	MPC · JPL
60369	2000 AJ_{120}	—	January 5, 2000	Socorro	LINEAR	NYS	2.5 km	MPC · JPL
60370	2000 AG_{126}	—	January 5, 2000	Socorro	LINEAR	·	5.9 km	MPC · JPL
60371	2000 AN_{139}	—	January 5, 2000	Socorro	LINEAR	·	4.0 km	MPC · JPL
60372	2000 AG_{141}	—	January 5, 2000	Socorro	LINEAR	·	2.2 km	MPC · JPL
60373	2000 AC_{144}	—	January 5, 2000	Socorro	LINEAR	·	2.8 km	MPC · JPL
60374	2000 AY_{144}	—	January 5, 2000	Socorro	LINEAR	H	1.3 km	MPC · JPL
60375	2000 AY_{146}	—	January 8, 2000	Socorro	LINEAR	H	2.3 km	MPC · JPL
60376	2000 AH_{150}	—	January 7, 2000	Socorro	LINEAR	·	2.8 km	MPC · JPL
60377	2000 AC_{165}	—	January 8, 2000	Socorro	LINEAR	fast	11 km	MPC · JPL
60378	2000 AL_{165}	—	January 8, 2000	Socorro	LINEAR	TIR	7.1 km	MPC · JPL
60379	2000 AL_{167}	—	January 8, 2000	Socorro	LINEAR	·	6.7 km	MPC · JPL
60380	2000 AY_{168}	—	January 7, 2000	Socorro	LINEAR	·	3.1 km	MPC · JPL
60381	2000 AX_{180}	—	January 7, 2000	Socorro	LINEAR	3:2	15 km	MPC · JPL
60382	2000 AR_{182}	—	January 7, 2000	Socorro	LINEAR	V	1.8 km	MPC · JPL
60383	2000 AR_{184}	—	January 7, 2000	Socorro	LINEAR	L4	35 km	MPC · JPL
60384	2000 AU_{185}	—	January 8, 2000	Socorro	LINEAR	·	9.4 km	MPC · JPL
60385	2000 AC_{195}	—	January 8, 2000	Socorro	LINEAR	·	4.2 km	MPC · JPL
60386	2000 AV_{202}	—	January 10, 2000	Socorro	LINEAR	·	8.6 km	MPC · JPL
60387	2000 AM_{207}	—	January 3, 2000	Kitt Peak	Spacewatch	·	4.5 km	MPC · JPL
60388	2000 AY_{217}	—	January 8, 2000	Kitt Peak	Spacewatch	L4	10 km	MPC · JPL
60389	2000 AO_{220}	—	January 8, 2000	Kitt Peak	Spacewatch	·	1.9 km	MPC · JPL
60390	2000 AD_{223}	—	January 9, 2000	Kitt Peak	Spacewatch	·	1.5 km	MPC · JPL
60391	2000 AQ_{224}	—	January 11, 2000	Kitt Peak	Spacewatch	·	2.3 km	MPC · JPL
60392	2000 AK_{227}	—	January 10, 2000	Kitt Peak	Spacewatch	(2076)	2.1 km	MPC · JPL
60393	2000 AX_{232}	—	January 4, 2000	Socorro	LINEAR	·	3.6 km	MPC · JPL
60394	2000 AY_{234}	—	January 5, 2000	Socorro	LINEAR	V	1.5 km	MPC · JPL
60395	2000 AJ_{237}	—	January 5, 2000	Socorro	LINEAR	·	14 km	MPC · JPL
60396	2000 AG_{243}	—	January 7, 2000	Anderson Mesa	LONEOS	H	1.4 km	MPC · JPL
60397	2000 AH_{243}	—	January 7, 2000	Anderson Mesa	LONEOS	·	6.5 km	MPC · JPL
60398	2000 AG_{251}	—	January 4, 2000	Socorro	LINEAR	3:2	12 km	MPC · JPL
60399	2000 AY_{253}	—	January 7, 2000	Kitt Peak	Spacewatch	L4	17 km	MPC · JPL
60400	2000 BA_{8}	—	January 29, 2000	Socorro	LINEAR	V	1.9 km	MPC · JPL

== 60401–60500 ==
back to top

Designation			Discovery			Properties		Ref
Permanent	Provisional	Named after	Date	Site	Discoverer(s)	Category	Diam.	Ref
60401	2000 BQ_{21}	—	January 29, 2000	Kitt Peak	Spacewatch	L4	18 km	MPC · JPL
60402	2000 BL_{27}	—	January 30, 2000	Socorro	LINEAR	·	2.6 km	MPC · JPL
60403	2000 BK_{30}	—	January 27, 2000	Kitt Peak	Spacewatch	·	5.2 km	MPC · JPL
60404	2000 BR_{37}	—	January 26, 2000	Kitt Peak	Spacewatch	·	1.2 km	MPC · JPL
60405	2000 BV_{51}	—	January 30, 2000	Catalina	CSS	·	2.7 km	MPC · JPL
60406 Albertosuci	2000 CR_{1}	Albertosuci	February 3, 2000	San Marcello	L. Tesi, A. Boattini	·	2.2 km	MPC · JPL
60407	2000 CZ_{1}	—	February 2, 2000	Uenohara	N. Kawasato	·	5.1 km	MPC · JPL
60408	2000 CB_{6}	—	February 2, 2000	Socorro	LINEAR	V	1.5 km	MPC · JPL
60409	2000 CO_{6}	—	February 2, 2000	Socorro	LINEAR	(2076)	2.4 km	MPC · JPL
60410	2000 CG_{16}	—	February 2, 2000	Socorro	LINEAR	·	6.0 km	MPC · JPL
60411	2000 CP_{20}	—	February 2, 2000	Socorro	LINEAR	·	3.5 km	MPC · JPL
60412	2000 CT_{22}	—	February 2, 2000	Socorro	LINEAR	EOS	4.6 km	MPC · JPL
60413	2000 CO_{23}	—	February 2, 2000	Socorro	LINEAR	·	3.5 km	MPC · JPL
60414	2000 CS_{23}	—	February 2, 2000	Socorro	LINEAR	·	2.5 km	MPC · JPL
60415	2000 CP_{24}	—	February 2, 2000	Socorro	LINEAR	MAR	2.9 km	MPC · JPL
60416	2000 CZ_{25}	—	February 2, 2000	Socorro	LINEAR	·	1.8 km	MPC · JPL
60417	2000 CD_{27}	—	February 2, 2000	Socorro	LINEAR	·	3.2 km	MPC · JPL
60418	2000 CU_{28}	—	February 2, 2000	Socorro	LINEAR	TIR	6.5 km	MPC · JPL
60419	2000 CY_{28}	—	February 2, 2000	Socorro	LINEAR	MAS	2.6 km	MPC · JPL
60420	2000 CC_{30}	—	February 2, 2000	Socorro	LINEAR	·	2.1 km	MPC · JPL
60421	2000 CZ_{31}	—	February 2, 2000	Socorro	LINEAR	L4	14 km	MPC · JPL
60422	2000 CR_{35}	—	February 2, 2000	Socorro	LINEAR	·	3.7 km	MPC · JPL
60423 Chvojen	2000 CO_{39}	Chvojen	February 4, 2000	Kleť	M. Tichý	H	920 m	MPC · JPL
60424	2000 CY_{48}	—	February 2, 2000	Socorro	LINEAR	·	3.6 km	MPC · JPL
60425	2000 CA_{49}	—	February 2, 2000	Socorro	LINEAR	·	5.1 km	MPC · JPL
60426	2000 CJ_{49}	—	February 2, 2000	Socorro	LINEAR	·	4.5 km	MPC · JPL
60427	2000 CV_{50}	—	February 2, 2000	Socorro	LINEAR	NYS	2.2 km	MPC · JPL
60428	2000 CZ_{50}	—	February 2, 2000	Socorro	LINEAR	·	3.7 km	MPC · JPL
60429	2000 CJ_{52}	—	February 2, 2000	Socorro	LINEAR	·	1.7 km	MPC · JPL
60430	2000 CF_{55}	—	February 3, 2000	Socorro	LINEAR	(12739)	3.6 km	MPC · JPL
60431	2000 CO_{58}	—	February 5, 2000	Socorro	LINEAR	·	5.0 km	MPC · JPL
60432	2000 CV_{61}	—	February 2, 2000	Socorro	LINEAR	V	1.6 km	MPC · JPL
60433	2000 CZ_{61}	—	February 2, 2000	Socorro	LINEAR	·	3.4 km	MPC · JPL
60434	2000 CJ_{63}	—	February 2, 2000	Socorro	LINEAR	EUN	3.7 km	MPC · JPL
60435	2000 CH_{65}	—	February 3, 2000	Socorro	LINEAR	EUN	2.6 km	MPC · JPL
60436	2000 CY_{70}	—	February 7, 2000	Socorro	LINEAR	·	3.3 km	MPC · JPL
60437	2000 CU_{76}	—	February 10, 2000	Višnjan Observatory	K. Korlević	·	1.6 km	MPC · JPL
60438	2000 CF_{78}	—	February 7, 2000	Kitt Peak	Spacewatch	·	3.1 km	MPC · JPL
60439	2000 CS_{81}	—	February 4, 2000	Socorro	LINEAR	·	1.9 km	MPC · JPL
60440	2000 CY_{82}	—	February 4, 2000	Socorro	LINEAR	·	8.3 km	MPC · JPL
60441	2000 CB_{83}	—	February 4, 2000	Socorro	LINEAR	MAS	1.6 km	MPC · JPL
60442	2000 CQ_{83}	—	February 4, 2000	Socorro	LINEAR	·	5.7 km	MPC · JPL
60443	2000 CH_{85}	—	February 4, 2000	Socorro	LINEAR	GEF	3.2 km	MPC · JPL
60444	2000 CV_{85}	—	February 4, 2000	Socorro	LINEAR	KOR	4.8 km	MPC · JPL
60445	2000 CA_{87}	—	February 4, 2000	Socorro	LINEAR	·	4.9 km	MPC · JPL
60446	2000 CA_{88}	—	February 4, 2000	Socorro	LINEAR	THM	7.0 km	MPC · JPL
60447	2000 CL_{90}	—	February 6, 2000	Socorro	LINEAR	·	3.3 km	MPC · JPL
60448	2000 CU_{91}	—	February 6, 2000	Socorro	LINEAR	·	4.4 km	MPC · JPL
60449	2000 CA_{92}	—	February 6, 2000	Socorro	LINEAR	KOR	4.7 km	MPC · JPL
60450	2000 CG_{93}	—	February 6, 2000	Socorro	LINEAR	·	2.1 km	MPC · JPL
60451	2000 CH_{93}	—	February 6, 2000	Socorro	LINEAR	·	6.2 km	MPC · JPL
60452	2000 CV_{96}	—	February 6, 2000	Socorro	LINEAR	·	2.1 km	MPC · JPL
60453	2000 CR_{102}	—	February 2, 2000	Socorro	LINEAR	·	2.9 km	MPC · JPL
60454	2000 CH_{105}	—	February 5, 2000	Kitt Peak	M. W. Buie	cubewano (cold)	153 km	MPC · JPL
60455	2000 CY_{106}	—	February 5, 2000	Kitt Peak	M. W. Buie	·	4.8 km	MPC · JPL
60456	2000 CD_{108}	—	February 5, 2000	Catalina	CSS	·	8.7 km	MPC · JPL
60457	2000 CS_{108}	—	February 5, 2000	Catalina	CSS	PHO	2.4 km	MPC · JPL
60458	2000 CM_{114}	—	February 5, 2000	Kitt Peak	M. W. Buie	SDO · moon	126 km	MPC · JPL
60459	2000 CE_{120}	—	February 2, 2000	Socorro	LINEAR	·	2.5 km	MPC · JPL
60460	2000 DJ_{2}	—	February 26, 2000	Kitt Peak	Spacewatch	·	4.7 km	MPC · JPL
60461	2000 DH_{4}	—	February 28, 2000	Socorro	LINEAR	·	1.7 km	MPC · JPL
60462	2000 DM_{4}	—	February 28, 2000	Socorro	LINEAR	·	3.1 km	MPC · JPL
60463	2000 DC_{5}	—	February 28, 2000	Socorro	LINEAR	TEL	4.8 km	MPC · JPL
60464	2000 DU_{6}	—	February 28, 2000	Socorro	LINEAR	(5)	3.0 km	MPC · JPL
60465	2000 DM_{9}	—	February 26, 2000	Kitt Peak	Spacewatch	KOR	3.9 km	MPC · JPL
60466	2000 DK_{12}	—	February 27, 2000	Kitt Peak	Spacewatch	NYS	4.8 km	MPC · JPL
60467	2000 DB_{14}	—	February 28, 2000	Kitt Peak	Spacewatch	·	3.4 km	MPC · JPL
60468	2000 DD_{18}	—	February 28, 2000	Socorro	LINEAR	·	5.1 km	MPC · JPL
60469	2000 DF_{22}	—	February 29, 2000	Socorro	LINEAR	·	1.3 km	MPC · JPL
60470	2000 DW_{23}	—	February 29, 2000	Socorro	LINEAR	(2076)	1.9 km	MPC · JPL
60471	2000 DT_{25}	—	February 29, 2000	Socorro	LINEAR	NYS	3.1 km	MPC · JPL
60472	2000 DY_{26}	—	February 29, 2000	Socorro	LINEAR	·	3.1 km	MPC · JPL
60473	2000 DY_{27}	—	February 29, 2000	Socorro	LINEAR	·	10 km	MPC · JPL
60474	2000 DT_{32}	—	February 29, 2000	Socorro	LINEAR	·	3.0 km	MPC · JPL
60475	2000 DC_{36}	—	February 29, 2000	Socorro	LINEAR	·	5.6 km	MPC · JPL
60476	2000 DV_{36}	—	February 29, 2000	Socorro	LINEAR	·	3.9 km	MPC · JPL
60477	2000 DE_{37}	—	February 29, 2000	Socorro	LINEAR	·	3.6 km	MPC · JPL
60478	2000 DK_{37}	—	February 29, 2000	Socorro	LINEAR	·	3.6 km	MPC · JPL
60479	2000 DX_{37}	—	February 29, 2000	Socorro	LINEAR	·	2.9 km	MPC · JPL
60480	2000 DD_{38}	—	February 29, 2000	Socorro	LINEAR	·	7.4 km	MPC · JPL
60481	2000 DF_{42}	—	February 29, 2000	Socorro	LINEAR	·	4.7 km	MPC · JPL
60482	2000 DN_{42}	—	February 29, 2000	Socorro	LINEAR	·	1.2 km	MPC · JPL
60483	2000 DD_{44}	—	February 29, 2000	Socorro	LINEAR	·	3.3 km	MPC · JPL
60484	2000 DM_{55}	—	February 29, 2000	Socorro	LINEAR	·	2.2 km	MPC · JPL
60485	2000 DM_{63}	—	February 29, 2000	Socorro	LINEAR	·	1.7 km	MPC · JPL
60486	2000 DS_{66}	—	February 29, 2000	Socorro	LINEAR	KOR	2.6 km	MPC · JPL
60487	2000 DM_{70}	—	February 29, 2000	Socorro	LINEAR	·	1.5 km	MPC · JPL
60488	2000 DF_{74}	—	February 29, 2000	Socorro	LINEAR	·	4.4 km	MPC · JPL
60489	2000 DP_{74}	—	February 29, 2000	Socorro	LINEAR	·	4.1 km	MPC · JPL
60490	2000 DX_{74}	—	February 29, 2000	Socorro	LINEAR	·	4.0 km	MPC · JPL
60491	2000 DD_{78}	—	February 29, 2000	Socorro	LINEAR	·	2.7 km	MPC · JPL
60492	2000 DG_{82}	—	February 28, 2000	Socorro	LINEAR	·	1.7 km	MPC · JPL
60493	2000 DC_{83}	—	February 28, 2000	Socorro	LINEAR	·	3.1 km	MPC · JPL
60494	2000 DE_{88}	—	February 29, 2000	Socorro	LINEAR	·	2.7 km	MPC · JPL
60495	2000 DF_{88}	—	February 29, 2000	Socorro	LINEAR	NYS	3.1 km	MPC · JPL
60496	2000 DC_{89}	—	February 26, 2000	Kitt Peak	Spacewatch	·	2.2 km	MPC · JPL
60497	2000 DH_{91}	—	February 27, 2000	Kitt Peak	Spacewatch	·	8.2 km	MPC · JPL
60498	2000 DC_{92}	—	February 27, 2000	Kitt Peak	Spacewatch	·	7.8 km	MPC · JPL
60499	2000 DN_{94}	—	February 28, 2000	Socorro	LINEAR	·	2.4 km	MPC · JPL
60500	2000 DW_{95}	—	February 28, 2000	Socorro	LINEAR	·	1.7 km	MPC · JPL

== 60501–60600 ==
back to top

Designation			Discovery			Properties		Ref
Permanent	Provisional	Named after	Date	Site	Discoverer(s)	Category	Diam.	Ref
60501	2000 DN_{96}	—	February 29, 2000	Socorro	LINEAR	·	6.0 km	MPC · JPL
60502	2000 DT_{96}	—	February 29, 2000	Socorro	LINEAR	·	2.4 km	MPC · JPL
60503	2000 DY_{100}	—	February 29, 2000	Socorro	LINEAR	EOS	5.1 km	MPC · JPL
60504	2000 DL_{102}	—	February 29, 2000	Socorro	LINEAR	·	7.7 km	MPC · JPL
60505	2000 DB_{104}	—	February 29, 2000	Socorro	LINEAR	·	1.7 km	MPC · JPL
60506	2000 DH_{104}	—	February 29, 2000	Socorro	LINEAR	·	2.6 km	MPC · JPL
60507	2000 DG_{106}	—	February 29, 2000	Socorro	LINEAR	·	2.2 km	MPC · JPL
60508	2000 DJ_{107}	—	February 29, 2000	Socorro	LINEAR	·	6.0 km	MPC · JPL
60509	2000 EA_{2}	—	March 3, 2000	Socorro	LINEAR	·	3.0 km	MPC · JPL
60510	2000 EV_{3}	—	March 3, 2000	Socorro	LINEAR	·	3.1 km	MPC · JPL
60511	2000 EF_{4}	—	March 3, 2000	Socorro	LINEAR	H	1.3 km	MPC · JPL
60512	2000 EU_{8}	—	March 3, 2000	Socorro	LINEAR	·	4.4 km	MPC · JPL
60513	2000 EK_{11}	—	March 4, 2000	Socorro	LINEAR	·	1.8 km	MPC · JPL
60514	2000 EC_{12}	—	March 4, 2000	Socorro	LINEAR	AGN	2.5 km	MPC · JPL
60515	2000 EQ_{14}	—	March 5, 2000	Višnjan Observatory	K. Korlević	·	4.2 km	MPC · JPL
60516	2000 EX_{16}	—	March 3, 2000	Socorro	LINEAR	·	5.8 km	MPC · JPL
60517	2000 EC_{18}	—	March 4, 2000	Socorro	LINEAR	V	1.4 km	MPC · JPL
60518	2000 ET_{19}	—	March 5, 2000	Socorro	LINEAR	·	1.9 km	MPC · JPL
60519	2000 EU_{25}	—	March 8, 2000	Kitt Peak	Spacewatch	NYS	3.7 km	MPC · JPL
60520	2000 ET_{32}	—	March 5, 2000	Socorro	LINEAR	EOS	5.8 km	MPC · JPL
60521	2000 EM_{34}	—	March 5, 2000	Socorro	LINEAR	·	5.8 km	MPC · JPL
60522	2000 EP_{35}	—	March 8, 2000	Socorro	LINEAR	·	9.6 km	MPC · JPL
60523	2000 EM_{37}	—	March 8, 2000	Socorro	LINEAR	NYS	2.4 km	MPC · JPL
60524	2000 EA_{40}	—	March 8, 2000	Socorro	LINEAR	·	5.1 km	MPC · JPL
60525	2000 EW_{40}	—	March 8, 2000	Socorro	LINEAR	·	3.1 km	MPC · JPL
60526	2000 EU_{41}	—	March 8, 2000	Socorro	LINEAR	·	2.7 km	MPC · JPL
60527	2000 EE_{43}	—	March 8, 2000	Socorro	LINEAR	·	6.7 km	MPC · JPL
60528	2000 EN_{44}	—	March 9, 2000	Socorro	LINEAR	·	3.1 km	MPC · JPL
60529	2000 EU_{47}	—	March 9, 2000	Socorro	LINEAR	·	1.5 km	MPC · JPL
60530	2000 ED_{48}	—	March 9, 2000	Socorro	LINEAR	·	3.3 km	MPC · JPL
60531	2000 EF_{50}	—	March 9, 2000	Tebbutt	F. B. Zoltowski	·	5.3 km	MPC · JPL
60532 Henson	2000 EX_{50}	Henson	March 11, 2000	Catalina	CSS	·	7.4 km	MPC · JPL
60533	2000 EC_{55}	—	March 10, 2000	Kitt Peak	Spacewatch	·	5.4 km	MPC · JPL
60534	2000 EB_{56}	—	March 5, 2000	Socorro	LINEAR	·	2.0 km	MPC · JPL
60535	2000 EM_{56}	—	March 8, 2000	Socorro	LINEAR	MAS	2.2 km	MPC · JPL
60536	2000 EE_{58}	—	March 8, 2000	Socorro	LINEAR	·	2.0 km	MPC · JPL
60537	2000 ED_{59}	—	March 9, 2000	Socorro	LINEAR	NYS	1.7 km	MPC · JPL
60538	2000 EX_{60}	—	March 10, 2000	Socorro	LINEAR	·	3.5 km	MPC · JPL
60539	2000 EB_{61}	—	March 10, 2000	Socorro	LINEAR	·	5.6 km	MPC · JPL
60540	2000 EZ_{61}	—	March 10, 2000	Socorro	LINEAR	·	1.9 km	MPC · JPL
60541	2000 EN_{63}	—	March 10, 2000	Socorro	LINEAR	MRX	3.0 km	MPC · JPL
60542	2000 EQ_{66}	—	March 10, 2000	Socorro	LINEAR	MAS ·	5.2 km	MPC · JPL
60543	2000 ET_{77}	—	March 5, 2000	Socorro	LINEAR	·	1.8 km	MPC · JPL
60544	2000 EP_{78}	—	March 5, 2000	Socorro	LINEAR	·	3.9 km	MPC · JPL
60545	2000 ES_{83}	—	March 5, 2000	Socorro	LINEAR	·	4.6 km	MPC · JPL
60546	2000 EE_{85}	—	March 8, 2000	Socorro	LINEAR	EUN	3.4 km	MPC · JPL
60547	2000 EF_{86}	—	March 8, 2000	Socorro	LINEAR	·	3.6 km	MPC · JPL
60548	2000 EH_{86}	—	March 8, 2000	Socorro	LINEAR	·	3.0 km	MPC · JPL
60549	2000 EL_{87}	—	March 8, 2000	Socorro	LINEAR	·	3.5 km	MPC · JPL
60550	2000 EX_{87}	—	March 8, 2000	Socorro	LINEAR	·	3.5 km	MPC · JPL
60551	2000 EQ_{88}	—	March 9, 2000	Socorro	LINEAR	EOS	4.3 km	MPC · JPL
60552	2000 EO_{89}	—	March 9, 2000	Socorro	LINEAR	KOR	3.3 km	MPC · JPL
60553	2000 ED_{91}	—	March 9, 2000	Socorro	LINEAR	V	3.1 km	MPC · JPL
60554	2000 EZ_{93}	—	March 9, 2000	Socorro	LINEAR	EUN	3.2 km	MPC · JPL
60555	2000 EJ_{94}	—	March 9, 2000	Socorro	LINEAR	V	2.0 km	MPC · JPL
60556	2000 EL_{95}	—	March 10, 2000	Socorro	LINEAR	MAR	3.4 km	MPC · JPL
60557	2000 EW_{95}	—	March 10, 2000	Socorro	LINEAR	·	1.2 km	MPC · JPL
60558 Echeclus	2000 EC_{98}	Echeclus	March 3, 2000	Kitt Peak	Spacewatch	centaur · Comet (174P)	59 km	MPC · JPL
60559	2000 EN_{98}	—	March 9, 2000	Kitt Peak	Spacewatch	THM	6.9 km	MPC · JPL
60560	2000 EQ_{103}	—	March 12, 2000	Socorro	LINEAR	·	2.9 km	MPC · JPL
60561	2000 EX_{104}	—	March 11, 2000	Anderson Mesa	LONEOS	·	1.3 km	MPC · JPL
60562	2000 EH_{106}	—	March 11, 2000	Anderson Mesa	LONEOS	·	4.3 km	MPC · JPL
60563	2000 EF_{107}	—	March 5, 2000	Haleakala	NEAT	·	1.3 km	MPC · JPL
60564	2000 ER_{108}	—	March 8, 2000	Haleakala	NEAT	·	1.6 km	MPC · JPL
60565	2000 EB_{109}	—	March 8, 2000	Socorro	LINEAR	RAF	2.9 km	MPC · JPL
60566	2000 EH_{109}	—	March 8, 2000	Haleakala	NEAT	·	4.1 km	MPC · JPL
60567	2000 EL_{110}	—	March 8, 2000	Haleakala	NEAT	·	5.2 km	MPC · JPL
60568	2000 ED_{111}	—	March 8, 2000	Haleakala	NEAT	·	4.2 km	MPC · JPL
60569	2000 EH_{112}	—	March 9, 2000	Socorro	LINEAR	·	2.7 km	MPC · JPL
60570	2000 ET_{113}	—	March 9, 2000	Kitt Peak	Spacewatch	·	6.1 km	MPC · JPL
60571	2000 ER_{116}	—	March 10, 2000	Socorro	LINEAR	NYS ·	5.0 km	MPC · JPL
60572	2000 EB_{117}	—	March 10, 2000	Socorro	LINEAR	·	4.7 km	MPC · JPL
60573	2000 ED_{118}	—	March 11, 2000	Anderson Mesa	LONEOS	·	4.0 km	MPC · JPL
60574	2000 EK_{119}	—	March 11, 2000	Anderson Mesa	LONEOS	TIR	8.1 km	MPC · JPL
60575	2000 EY_{121}	—	March 11, 2000	Anderson Mesa	LONEOS	·	2.6 km	MPC · JPL
60576	2000 EJ_{122}	—	March 11, 2000	Anderson Mesa	LONEOS	KOR	3.9 km	MPC · JPL
60577	2000 EW_{122}	—	March 11, 2000	Socorro	LINEAR	·	5.7 km	MPC · JPL
60578	2000 ED_{123}	—	March 11, 2000	Catalina	CSS	·	3.1 km	MPC · JPL
60579	2000 EK_{127}	—	March 11, 2000	Anderson Mesa	LONEOS	·	3.2 km	MPC · JPL
60580	2000 ER_{127}	—	March 11, 2000	Anderson Mesa	LONEOS	·	2.2 km	MPC · JPL
60581	2000 EE_{128}	—	March 11, 2000	Anderson Mesa	LONEOS	fast	4.1 km	MPC · JPL
60582	2000 EB_{130}	—	March 11, 2000	Anderson Mesa	LONEOS	·	1.6 km	MPC · JPL
60583	2000 EQ_{132}	—	March 11, 2000	Socorro	LINEAR	·	1.3 km	MPC · JPL
60584	2000 EW_{132}	—	March 11, 2000	Socorro	LINEAR	·	3.5 km	MPC · JPL
60585	2000 EZ_{132}	—	March 11, 2000	Socorro	LINEAR	·	1.2 km	MPC · JPL
60586	2000 EZ_{136}	—	March 12, 2000	Socorro	LINEAR	·	2.7 km	MPC · JPL
60587	2000 EL_{139}	—	March 11, 2000	Socorro	LINEAR	·	3.5 km	MPC · JPL
60588	2000 EQ_{139}	—	March 12, 2000	Catalina	CSS	V	2.5 km	MPC · JPL
60589	2000 EU_{139}	—	March 12, 2000	Catalina	CSS	·	9.8 km	MPC · JPL
60590	2000 EE_{140}	—	March 5, 2000	Socorro	LINEAR	·	5.6 km	MPC · JPL
60591	2000 EV_{141}	—	March 2, 2000	Catalina	CSS	·	2.3 km	MPC · JPL
60592	2000 EE_{146}	—	March 4, 2000	Socorro	LINEAR	·	3.8 km	MPC · JPL
60593	2000 EN_{146}	—	March 4, 2000	Socorro	LINEAR	·	1.4 km	MPC · JPL
60594	2000 ER_{147}	—	March 4, 2000	Catalina	CSS	·	3.3 km	MPC · JPL
60595	2000 EN_{150}	—	March 5, 2000	Haleakala	NEAT	EUN	4.9 km	MPC · JPL
60596	2000 EZ_{150}	—	March 5, 2000	Haleakala	NEAT	NYS	3.1 km	MPC · JPL
60597	2000 EJ_{154}	—	March 6, 2000	Haleakala	NEAT	·	6.6 km	MPC · JPL
60598	2000 EX_{154}	—	March 7, 2000	Socorro	LINEAR	MAR	3.2 km	MPC · JPL
60599	2000 EY_{154}	—	March 7, 2000	Socorro	LINEAR	·	4.0 km	MPC · JPL
60600	2000 EG_{157}	—	March 11, 2000	Catalina	CSS	EUN	2.8 km	MPC · JPL

== 60601–60700 ==
back to top

Designation			Discovery			Properties		Ref
Permanent	Provisional	Named after	Date	Site	Discoverer(s)	Category	Diam.	Ref
60601	2000 EQ_{157}	—	March 12, 2000	Anderson Mesa	LONEOS	·	3.6 km	MPC · JPL
60602	2000 EV_{161}	—	March 3, 2000	Socorro	LINEAR	·	4.2 km	MPC · JPL
60603	2000 EF_{163}	—	March 3, 2000	Socorro	LINEAR	·	2.7 km	MPC · JPL
60604	2000 EP_{164}	—	March 3, 2000	Socorro	LINEAR	V	1.8 km	MPC · JPL
60605	2000 EZ_{167}	—	March 4, 2000	Socorro	LINEAR	VER	8.8 km	MPC · JPL
60606	2000 EC_{171}	—	March 5, 2000	Socorro	LINEAR	·	5.5 km	MPC · JPL
60607	2000 EA_{172}	—	March 9, 2000	Socorro	LINEAR	·	3.2 km	MPC · JPL
60608	2000 EE_{173}	—	March 3, 2000	Kitt Peak	J. X. Luu, C. A. Trujillo, Evans, W.	centaur	117 km	MPC · JPL
60609 Kerryprice	2000 EA_{175}	Kerryprice	March 2, 2000	Catalina	CSS	·	3.8 km	MPC · JPL
60610	2000 EB_{181}	—	March 4, 2000	Socorro	LINEAR	·	5.4 km	MPC · JPL
60611	2000 ED_{185}	—	March 5, 2000	Socorro	LINEAR	EOS	5.1 km	MPC · JPL
60612	2000 EE_{190}	—	March 3, 2000	Socorro	LINEAR	(43176)	4.6 km	MPC · JPL
60613	2000 EO_{196}	—	March 3, 2000	Socorro	LINEAR	ADE	3.5 km	MPC · JPL
60614 Tomshea	2000 EU_{198}	Tomshea	March 1, 2000	Catalina	CSS	·	3.7 km	MPC · JPL
60615	2000 EV_{205}	—	March 12, 2000	Socorro	LINEAR	(5)	4.1 km	MPC · JPL
60616	2000 FH_{1}	—	March 26, 2000	Socorro	LINEAR	·	9.8 km	MPC · JPL
60617	2000 FM_{3}	—	March 28, 2000	Socorro	LINEAR	·	1.7 km	MPC · JPL
60618	2000 FP_{3}	—	March 28, 2000	Socorro	LINEAR	V	1.6 km	MPC · JPL
60619	2000 FZ_{4}	—	March 27, 2000	Kitt Peak	Spacewatch	·	1.9 km	MPC · JPL
60620	2000 FD_{8}	—	March 27, 2000	Mauna Kea	J. J. Kavelaars, B. Gladman, Petit, J.-M., M. J. Holman	res · 4:7	177 km	MPC · JPL
60621	2000 FE_{8}	—	March 27, 2000	Mauna Kea	J. J. Kavelaars, B. Gladman, Petit, J.-M., M. J. Holman	res · 2:5 · moon	158 km	MPC · JPL
60622 Pritchet	2000 FK_{8}	Pritchet	March 30, 2000	NRC-DAO	D. D. Balam	·	1.4 km	MPC · JPL
60623	2000 FW_{13}	—	March 28, 2000	Socorro	LINEAR	·	2.6 km	MPC · JPL
60624	2000 FT_{14}	—	March 29, 2000	Socorro	LINEAR	H	1.0 km	MPC · JPL
60625	2000 FA_{17}	—	March 28, 2000	Socorro	LINEAR	·	5.0 km	MPC · JPL
60626	2000 FU_{21}	—	March 29, 2000	Socorro	LINEAR	·	2.6 km	MPC · JPL
60627	2000 FJ_{23}	—	March 29, 2000	Socorro	LINEAR	·	4.3 km	MPC · JPL
60628	2000 FX_{24}	—	March 29, 2000	Socorro	LINEAR	·	3.9 km	MPC · JPL
60629	2000 FX_{25}	—	March 27, 2000	Anderson Mesa	LONEOS	V	1.4 km	MPC · JPL
60630	2000 FY_{25}	—	March 27, 2000	Anderson Mesa	LONEOS	·	2.7 km	MPC · JPL
60631	2000 FC_{26}	—	March 27, 2000	Anderson Mesa	LONEOS	·	2.8 km	MPC · JPL
60632	2000 FE_{27}	—	March 27, 2000	Anderson Mesa	LONEOS	·	1.8 km	MPC · JPL
60633	2000 FF_{27}	—	March 27, 2000	Anderson Mesa	LONEOS	V	1.2 km	MPC · JPL
60634	2000 FW_{27}	—	March 27, 2000	Anderson Mesa	LONEOS	·	2.9 km	MPC · JPL
60635	2000 FD_{30}	—	March 27, 2000	Anderson Mesa	LONEOS	(5)	3.4 km	MPC · JPL
60636	2000 FH_{30}	—	March 27, 2000	Anderson Mesa	LONEOS	MAR	3.9 km	MPC · JPL
60637	2000 FX_{30}	—	March 29, 2000	Kvistaberg	Uppsala-DLR Asteroid Survey	·	3.5 km	MPC · JPL
60638	2000 FF_{31}	—	March 28, 2000	Socorro	LINEAR	EMA	9.4 km	MPC · JPL
60639	2000 FW_{31}	—	March 29, 2000	Socorro	LINEAR	·	3.1 km	MPC · JPL
60640	2000 FE_{34}	—	March 29, 2000	Socorro	LINEAR	·	4.2 km	MPC · JPL
60641	2000 FP_{35}	—	March 29, 2000	Socorro	LINEAR	·	7.4 km	MPC · JPL
60642	2000 FP_{37}	—	March 29, 2000	Socorro	LINEAR	·	5.8 km	MPC · JPL
60643	2000 FU_{37}	—	March 29, 2000	Socorro	LINEAR	·	3.0 km	MPC · JPL
60644	2000 FY_{37}	—	March 29, 2000	Socorro	LINEAR	·	4.6 km	MPC · JPL
60645	2000 FU_{38}	—	March 29, 2000	Socorro	LINEAR	NYS	3.6 km	MPC · JPL
60646	2000 FJ_{39}	—	March 29, 2000	Socorro	LINEAR	·	3.7 km	MPC · JPL
60647	2000 FA_{40}	—	March 29, 2000	Socorro	LINEAR	·	2.7 km	MPC · JPL
60648	2000 FY_{40}	—	March 29, 2000	Socorro	LINEAR	AGN	3.2 km	MPC · JPL
60649	2000 FZ_{41}	—	March 29, 2000	Socorro	LINEAR	·	2.9 km	MPC · JPL
60650	2000 FF_{42}	—	March 29, 2000	Socorro	LINEAR	·	4.1 km	MPC · JPL
60651	2000 FU_{42}	—	March 28, 2000	Socorro	LINEAR	NYS	3.0 km	MPC · JPL
60652	2000 FG_{43}	—	March 29, 2000	Socorro	LINEAR	·	2.9 km	MPC · JPL
60653	2000 FA_{45}	—	March 29, 2000	Socorro	LINEAR	·	1.9 km	MPC · JPL
60654	2000 FP_{45}	—	March 29, 2000	Socorro	LINEAR	RAF	2.7 km	MPC · JPL
60655	2000 FV_{45}	—	March 29, 2000	Socorro	LINEAR	GEF	3.3 km	MPC · JPL
60656	2000 FF_{47}	—	March 29, 2000	Socorro	LINEAR	·	4.1 km	MPC · JPL
60657	2000 FT_{47}	—	March 29, 2000	Socorro	LINEAR	·	6.5 km	MPC · JPL
60658	2000 FG_{48}	—	March 29, 2000	Socorro	LINEAR	MAS	5.0 km	MPC · JPL
60659	2000 FX_{49}	—	March 30, 2000	Socorro	LINEAR	·	1.6 km	MPC · JPL
60660	2000 FL_{50}	—	March 27, 2000	Anderson Mesa	LONEOS	·	1.4 km	MPC · JPL
60661	2000 FF_{57}	—	March 26, 2000	Anderson Mesa	LONEOS	KOR	4.0 km	MPC · JPL
60662	2000 FX_{61}	—	March 26, 2000	Anderson Mesa	LONEOS	·	2.1 km	MPC · JPL
60663	2000 FZ_{65}	—	March 29, 2000	Socorro	LINEAR	·	2.1 km	MPC · JPL
60664	2000 FX_{72}	—	March 26, 2000	Anderson Mesa	LONEOS	·	2.9 km	MPC · JPL
60665	2000 FL_{73}	—	March 25, 2000	Kitt Peak	Spacewatch	NYS	2.0 km	MPC · JPL
60666	2000 FT_{73}	—	March 26, 2000	Anderson Mesa	LONEOS	PHO	4.7 km	MPC · JPL
60667	2000 GQ_{1}	—	April 4, 2000	Prescott	P. G. Comba	·	1.3 km	MPC · JPL
60668	2000 GJ_{3}	—	April 5, 2000	Socorro	LINEAR	PHO	2.4 km	MPC · JPL
60669 Georgpick	2000 GE_{4}	Georgpick	April 7, 2000	Kleť	M. Tichý	·	1.9 km	MPC · JPL
60670	2000 GX_{5}	—	April 4, 2000	Socorro	LINEAR	·	1.9 km	MPC · JPL
60671	2000 GP_{9}	—	April 5, 2000	Socorro	LINEAR	·	2.8 km	MPC · JPL
60672	2000 GE_{10}	—	April 5, 2000	Socorro	LINEAR	·	3.3 km	MPC · JPL
60673	2000 GH_{10}	—	April 5, 2000	Socorro	LINEAR	·	4.6 km	MPC · JPL
60674	2000 GN_{10}	—	April 5, 2000	Socorro	LINEAR	·	5.2 km	MPC · JPL
60675	2000 GA_{12}	—	April 5, 2000	Socorro	LINEAR	·	2.6 km	MPC · JPL
60676	2000 GQ_{14}	—	April 5, 2000	Socorro	LINEAR	·	3.4 km	MPC · JPL
60677	2000 GO_{18}	—	April 5, 2000	Socorro	LINEAR	NYS	2.6 km	MPC · JPL
60678	2000 GA_{23}	—	April 5, 2000	Socorro	LINEAR	·	4.8 km	MPC · JPL
60679	2000 GE_{24}	—	April 5, 2000	Socorro	LINEAR	KOR	3.7 km	MPC · JPL
60680	2000 GW_{27}	—	April 5, 2000	Socorro	LINEAR	(5)	3.2 km	MPC · JPL
60681	2000 GE_{31}	—	April 5, 2000	Socorro	LINEAR	·	2.0 km	MPC · JPL
60682	2000 GU_{31}	—	April 5, 2000	Socorro	LINEAR	THM	5.9 km	MPC · JPL
60683	2000 GL_{33}	—	April 5, 2000	Socorro	LINEAR	·	1.4 km	MPC · JPL
60684	2000 GA_{34}	—	April 5, 2000	Socorro	LINEAR	·	2.1 km	MPC · JPL
60685	2000 GP_{34}	—	April 5, 2000	Socorro	LINEAR	·	1.4 km	MPC · JPL
60686	2000 GN_{35}	—	April 5, 2000	Socorro	LINEAR	·	3.0 km	MPC · JPL
60687	2000 GS_{35}	—	April 5, 2000	Socorro	LINEAR	·	3.6 km	MPC · JPL
60688	2000 GY_{35}	—	April 5, 2000	Socorro	LINEAR	KOR	3.7 km	MPC · JPL
60689	2000 GG_{37}	—	April 5, 2000	Socorro	LINEAR	·	2.0 km	MPC · JPL
60690	2000 GD_{38}	—	April 5, 2000	Socorro	LINEAR	·	1.5 km	MPC · JPL
60691	2000 GJ_{38}	—	April 5, 2000	Socorro	LINEAR	·	6.3 km	MPC · JPL
60692	2000 GC_{40}	—	April 5, 2000	Socorro	LINEAR	·	2.0 km	MPC · JPL
60693	2000 GX_{40}	—	April 5, 2000	Socorro	LINEAR	KOR	3.6 km	MPC · JPL
60694	2000 GG_{41}	—	April 5, 2000	Socorro	LINEAR	(5)	3.0 km	MPC · JPL
60695	2000 GM_{42}	—	April 5, 2000	Socorro	LINEAR	·	2.3 km	MPC · JPL
60696	2000 GQ_{43}	—	April 5, 2000	Socorro	LINEAR	·	5.2 km	MPC · JPL
60697	2000 GG_{45}	—	April 5, 2000	Socorro	LINEAR	·	2.9 km	MPC · JPL
60698	2000 GB_{46}	—	April 5, 2000	Socorro	LINEAR	·	3.9 km	MPC · JPL
60699	2000 GN_{47}	—	April 5, 2000	Socorro	LINEAR	·	3.0 km	MPC · JPL
60700	2000 GL_{50}	—	April 5, 2000	Socorro	LINEAR	·	1.5 km	MPC · JPL

== 60701–60800 ==
back to top

Designation			Discovery			Properties		Ref
Permanent	Provisional	Named after	Date	Site	Discoverer(s)	Category	Diam.	Ref
60701	2000 GQ_{51}	—	April 5, 2000	Socorro	LINEAR	·	2.4 km	MPC · JPL
60702	2000 GU_{52}	—	April 5, 2000	Socorro	LINEAR	·	4.4 km	MPC · JPL
60703	2000 GU_{53}	—	April 5, 2000	Socorro	LINEAR	·	3.8 km	MPC · JPL
60704	2000 GK_{55}	—	April 5, 2000	Socorro	LINEAR	·	3.4 km	MPC · JPL
60705	2000 GU_{55}	—	April 5, 2000	Socorro	LINEAR	·	4.2 km	MPC · JPL
60706	2000 GB_{56}	—	April 5, 2000	Socorro	LINEAR	·	3.2 km	MPC · JPL
60707	2000 GP_{56}	—	April 5, 2000	Socorro	LINEAR	·	3.3 km	MPC · JPL
60708	2000 GC_{57}	—	April 5, 2000	Socorro	LINEAR	(17392)	4.1 km	MPC · JPL
60709	2000 GN_{57}	—	April 5, 2000	Socorro	LINEAR	V	1.6 km	MPC · JPL
60710	2000 GU_{57}	—	April 5, 2000	Socorro	LINEAR	·	1.5 km	MPC · JPL
60711	2000 GS_{59}	—	April 5, 2000	Socorro	LINEAR	·	2.9 km	MPC · JPL
60712	2000 GM_{60}	—	April 5, 2000	Socorro	LINEAR	URS	9.5 km	MPC · JPL
60713	2000 GK_{61}	—	April 5, 2000	Socorro	LINEAR	·	1.3 km	MPC · JPL
60714	2000 GN_{62}	—	April 5, 2000	Socorro	LINEAR	·	1.4 km	MPC · JPL
60715	2000 GX_{64}	—	April 5, 2000	Socorro	LINEAR	·	3.1 km	MPC · JPL
60716	2000 GD_{65}	—	April 5, 2000	Socorro	LINEAR	fast	3.0 km	MPC · JPL
60717	2000 GZ_{66}	—	April 5, 2000	Socorro	LINEAR	·	1.3 km	MPC · JPL
60718	2000 GN_{69}	—	April 5, 2000	Socorro	LINEAR	·	2.6 km	MPC · JPL
60719	2000 GQ_{69}	—	April 5, 2000	Socorro	LINEAR	·	1.8 km	MPC · JPL
60720	2000 GC_{72}	—	April 5, 2000	Socorro	LINEAR	NYS	2.0 km	MPC · JPL
60721	2000 GA_{73}	—	April 5, 2000	Socorro	LINEAR	·	4.6 km	MPC · JPL
60722	2000 GE_{73}	—	April 5, 2000	Socorro	LINEAR	EUN	3.0 km	MPC · JPL
60723	2000 GU_{73}	—	April 5, 2000	Socorro	LINEAR	·	1.6 km	MPC · JPL
60724	2000 GE_{74}	—	April 5, 2000	Socorro	LINEAR	·	1.2 km	MPC · JPL
60725	2000 GH_{74}	—	April 5, 2000	Socorro	LINEAR	HYG	7.5 km	MPC · JPL
60726	2000 GE_{75}	—	April 5, 2000	Socorro	LINEAR	·	2.0 km	MPC · JPL
60727	2000 GO_{75}	—	April 5, 2000	Socorro	LINEAR	·	2.4 km	MPC · JPL
60728	2000 GS_{76}	—	April 5, 2000	Socorro	LINEAR	·	1.4 km	MPC · JPL
60729	2000 GZ_{78}	—	April 5, 2000	Socorro	LINEAR	·	1.7 km	MPC · JPL
60730	2000 GC_{79}	—	April 5, 2000	Socorro	LINEAR	·	2.3 km	MPC · JPL
60731	2000 GQ_{79}	—	April 5, 2000	Socorro	LINEAR	·	1.8 km	MPC · JPL
60732	2000 GK_{80}	—	April 6, 2000	Socorro	LINEAR	THM	7.4 km	MPC · JPL
60733	2000 GL_{80}	—	April 6, 2000	Socorro	LINEAR	·	2.3 km	MPC · JPL
60734	2000 GT_{80}	—	April 6, 2000	Socorro	LINEAR	·	1.6 km	MPC · JPL
60735	2000 GF_{82}	—	April 7, 2000	Socorro	LINEAR	·	2.7 km	MPC · JPL
60736	2000 GJ_{82}	—	April 8, 2000	Višnjan Observatory	K. Korlević	·	3.6 km	MPC · JPL
60737	2000 GB_{87}	—	April 4, 2000	Socorro	LINEAR	·	2.6 km	MPC · JPL
60738	2000 GK_{87}	—	April 4, 2000	Socorro	LINEAR	·	4.6 km	MPC · JPL
60739	2000 GR_{87}	—	April 4, 2000	Socorro	LINEAR	EOS	3.7 km	MPC · JPL
60740	2000 GU_{89}	—	April 4, 2000	Socorro	LINEAR	·	3.2 km	MPC · JPL
60741	2000 GY_{90}	—	April 4, 2000	Socorro	LINEAR	slow	4.3 km	MPC · JPL
60742	2000 GY_{91}	—	April 4, 2000	Socorro	LINEAR	·	13 km	MPC · JPL
60743	2000 GU_{92}	—	April 5, 2000	Socorro	LINEAR	·	2.8 km	MPC · JPL
60744	2000 GB_{93}	—	April 5, 2000	Socorro	LINEAR	·	2.9 km	MPC · JPL
60745	2000 GQ_{93}	—	April 5, 2000	Socorro	LINEAR	·	6.1 km	MPC · JPL
60746	2000 GA_{95}	—	April 6, 2000	Socorro	LINEAR	slow	2.2 km	MPC · JPL
60747	2000 GW_{95}	—	April 6, 2000	Socorro	LINEAR	·	1.9 km	MPC · JPL
60748	2000 GC_{96}	—	April 6, 2000	Socorro	LINEAR	·	5.3 km	MPC · JPL
60749	2000 GF_{96}	—	April 6, 2000	Socorro	LINEAR	·	4.7 km	MPC · JPL
60750	2000 GQ_{98}	—	April 7, 2000	Socorro	LINEAR	·	2.1 km	MPC · JPL
60751	2000 GU_{98}	—	April 7, 2000	Socorro	LINEAR	ADE	5.7 km	MPC · JPL
60752	2000 GM_{99}	—	April 7, 2000	Socorro	LINEAR	·	2.2 km	MPC · JPL
60753	2000 GA_{101}	—	April 7, 2000	Socorro	LINEAR	(1338) (FLO)	1.6 km	MPC · JPL
60754	2000 GH_{101}	—	April 7, 2000	Socorro	LINEAR	·	3.5 km	MPC · JPL
60755	2000 GU_{101}	—	April 7, 2000	Socorro	LINEAR	EOS	5.1 km	MPC · JPL
60756	2000 GM_{104}	—	April 7, 2000	Socorro	LINEAR	·	1.5 km	MPC · JPL
60757	2000 GK_{107}	—	April 7, 2000	Socorro	LINEAR	·	2.5 km	MPC · JPL
60758	2000 GP_{108}	—	April 7, 2000	Socorro	LINEAR	·	2.8 km	MPC · JPL
60759	2000 GA_{112}	—	April 3, 2000	Anderson Mesa	LONEOS	BRA	4.1 km	MPC · JPL
60760	2000 GC_{113}	—	April 5, 2000	Socorro	LINEAR	·	4.6 km	MPC · JPL
60761	2000 GK_{113}	—	April 6, 2000	Socorro	LINEAR	·	2.4 km	MPC · JPL
60762	2000 GA_{115}	—	April 8, 2000	Socorro	LINEAR	NYS	3.6 km	MPC · JPL
60763	2000 GN_{118}	—	April 3, 2000	Kitt Peak	Spacewatch	·	1.2 km	MPC · JPL
60764	2000 GV_{122}	—	April 11, 2000	Fountain Hills	C. W. Juels	·	6.0 km	MPC · JPL
60765	2000 GE_{124}	—	April 7, 2000	Socorro	LINEAR	·	2.9 km	MPC · JPL
60766	2000 GU_{124}	—	April 7, 2000	Socorro	LINEAR	EUN ·	6.4 km	MPC · JPL
60767	2000 GU_{133}	—	April 7, 2000	Socorro	LINEAR	PHO	2.5 km	MPC · JPL
60768	2000 GY_{136}	—	April 12, 2000	Socorro	LINEAR	·	5.1 km	MPC · JPL
60769	2000 GF_{143}	—	April 7, 2000	Anderson Mesa	LONEOS	·	2.8 km	MPC · JPL
60770	2000 GL_{143}	—	April 7, 2000	Anderson Mesa	LONEOS	PHO	3.6 km	MPC · JPL
60771	2000 GS_{154}	—	April 6, 2000	Anderson Mesa	LONEOS	·	3.2 km	MPC · JPL
60772	2000 GY_{155}	—	April 6, 2000	Anderson Mesa	LONEOS	·	3.4 km	MPC · JPL
60773	2000 GD_{158}	—	April 7, 2000	Anderson Mesa	LONEOS	slow	7.9 km	MPC · JPL
60774	2000 GW_{159}	—	April 7, 2000	Socorro	LINEAR	·	3.1 km	MPC · JPL
60775	2000 GG_{160}	—	April 7, 2000	Socorro	LINEAR	EOS	6.3 km	MPC · JPL
60776	2000 GP_{160}	—	April 7, 2000	Socorro	LINEAR	·	3.3 km	MPC · JPL
60777	2000 GS_{162}	—	April 8, 2000	Socorro	LINEAR	ADE	7.1 km	MPC · JPL
60778	2000 GU_{162}	—	April 8, 2000	Socorro	LINEAR	NYS	2.3 km	MPC · JPL
60779	2000 GY_{162}	—	April 8, 2000	Socorro	LINEAR	·	3.3 km	MPC · JPL
60780	2000 GA_{164}	—	April 12, 2000	Socorro	LINEAR	V	1.8 km	MPC · JPL
60781	2000 GD_{164}	—	April 12, 2000	Haleakala	NEAT	EUN	2.7 km	MPC · JPL
60782	2000 GJ_{166}	—	April 5, 2000	Socorro	LINEAR	AST	3.0 km	MPC · JPL
60783	2000 GB_{171}	—	April 5, 2000	Anderson Mesa	LONEOS	·	1.7 km	MPC · JPL
60784	2000 GC_{178}	—	April 2, 2000	Anderson Mesa	LONEOS	·	4.7 km	MPC · JPL
60785	2000 GT_{179}	—	April 5, 2000	Anderson Mesa	LONEOS	·	2.2 km	MPC · JPL
60786	2000 GP_{182}	—	April 3, 2000	Kitt Peak	Spacewatch	V	1.5 km	MPC · JPL
60787	2000 GW_{183}	—	April 14, 2000	Socorro	LINEAR	·	3.6 km	MPC · JPL
60788	2000 HW	—	April 24, 2000	Kitt Peak	Spacewatch	·	1.5 km	MPC · JPL
60789	2000 HW_{1}	—	April 25, 2000	Višnjan Observatory	K. Korlević	V	1.6 km	MPC · JPL
60790	2000 HD_{4}	—	April 26, 2000	Kitt Peak	Spacewatch	·	2.4 km	MPC · JPL
60791	2000 HM_{6}	—	April 24, 2000	Kitt Peak	Spacewatch	·	3.7 km	MPC · JPL
60792	2000 HS_{6}	—	April 24, 2000	Kitt Peak	Spacewatch	THM	6.0 km	MPC · JPL
60793	2000 HQ_{7}	—	April 27, 2000	Socorro	LINEAR	·	5.8 km	MPC · JPL
60794	2000 HR_{7}	—	April 27, 2000	Socorro	LINEAR	·	4.8 km	MPC · JPL
60795	2000 HO_{8}	—	April 27, 2000	Socorro	LINEAR	·	2.6 km	MPC · JPL
60796	2000 HB_{9}	—	April 27, 2000	Socorro	LINEAR	·	2.7 km	MPC · JPL
60797	2000 HR_{10}	—	April 27, 2000	Socorro	LINEAR	·	1.5 km	MPC · JPL
60798	2000 HV_{10}	—	April 27, 2000	Socorro	LINEAR	·	2.3 km	MPC · JPL
60799	2000 HV_{11}	—	April 28, 2000	Socorro	LINEAR	·	2.9 km	MPC · JPL
60800	2000 HJ_{12}	—	April 28, 2000	Socorro	LINEAR	·	2.7 km	MPC · JPL

== 60801–60900 ==
back to top

Designation			Discovery			Properties		Ref
Permanent	Provisional	Named after	Date	Site	Discoverer(s)	Category	Diam.	Ref
60801	2000 HA_{15}	—	April 27, 2000	Socorro	LINEAR	·	3.8 km	MPC · JPL
60802	2000 HK_{15}	—	April 27, 2000	Socorro	LINEAR	·	3.8 km	MPC · JPL
60803	2000 HF_{18}	—	April 24, 2000	Kitt Peak	Spacewatch	·	3.7 km	MPC · JPL
60804	2000 HD_{23}	—	April 30, 2000	Socorro	LINEAR	·	1.2 km	MPC · JPL
60805	2000 HS_{23}	—	April 26, 2000	Višnjan Observatory	K. Korlević	·	2.2 km	MPC · JPL
60806	2000 HT_{25}	—	April 24, 2000	Anderson Mesa	LONEOS	·	2.1 km	MPC · JPL
60807	2000 HN_{26}	—	April 24, 2000	Anderson Mesa	LONEOS	·	7.5 km	MPC · JPL
60808	2000 HQ_{26}	—	April 24, 2000	Anderson Mesa	LONEOS	·	6.1 km	MPC · JPL
60809	2000 HG_{28}	—	April 28, 2000	Socorro	LINEAR	PHO	3.1 km	MPC · JPL
60810	2000 HT_{28}	—	April 29, 2000	Socorro	LINEAR	·	3.8 km	MPC · JPL
60811	2000 HE_{30}	—	April 28, 2000	Socorro	LINEAR	JUN	8.7 km	MPC · JPL
60812	2000 HL_{30}	—	April 28, 2000	Socorro	LINEAR	·	3.2 km	MPC · JPL
60813	2000 HG_{31}	—	April 29, 2000	Socorro	LINEAR	·	3.5 km	MPC · JPL
60814	2000 HG_{32}	—	April 29, 2000	Socorro	LINEAR	NYS	2.2 km	MPC · JPL
60815	2000 HY_{32}	—	April 29, 2000	Socorro	LINEAR	HNS	4.1 km	MPC · JPL
60816	2000 HO_{34}	—	April 25, 2000	Anderson Mesa	LONEOS	·	1.8 km	MPC · JPL
60817	2000 HR_{37}	—	April 29, 2000	Socorro	LINEAR	HNS	3.1 km	MPC · JPL
60818	2000 HM_{38}	—	April 28, 2000	Kitt Peak	Spacewatch	(5)	3.0 km	MPC · JPL
60819	2000 HY_{38}	—	April 28, 2000	Kitt Peak	Spacewatch	HOF	6.3 km	MPC · JPL
60820	2000 HZ_{39}	—	April 30, 2000	Kitt Peak	Spacewatch	·	1.3 km	MPC · JPL
60821	2000 HD_{40}	—	April 30, 2000	Kitt Peak	Spacewatch	(5)	2.3 km	MPC · JPL
60822	2000 HX_{42}	—	April 29, 2000	Socorro	LINEAR	HYG	5.8 km	MPC · JPL
60823	2000 HB_{43}	—	April 29, 2000	Socorro	LINEAR	·	3.0 km	MPC · JPL
60824	2000 HG_{43}	—	April 29, 2000	Socorro	LINEAR	·	1.7 km	MPC · JPL
60825	2000 HW_{45}	—	April 26, 2000	Anderson Mesa	LONEOS	·	2.6 km	MPC · JPL
60826	2000 HO_{46}	—	April 29, 2000	Socorro	LINEAR	·	1.1 km	MPC · JPL
60827	2000 HW_{46}	—	April 29, 2000	Socorro	LINEAR	·	4.0 km	MPC · JPL
60828	2000 HX_{46}	—	April 29, 2000	Socorro	LINEAR	·	1.3 km	MPC · JPL
60829	2000 HY_{46}	—	April 29, 2000	Socorro	LINEAR	NYS	2.0 km	MPC · JPL
60830	2000 HZ_{47}	—	April 29, 2000	Socorro	LINEAR	·	1.4 km	MPC · JPL
60831	2000 HL_{48}	—	April 29, 2000	Socorro	LINEAR	·	5.4 km	MPC · JPL
60832	2000 HU_{48}	—	April 29, 2000	Socorro	LINEAR	·	1.9 km	MPC · JPL
60833	2000 HB_{49}	—	April 29, 2000	Socorro	LINEAR	GEF	2.8 km	MPC · JPL
60834	2000 HL_{49}	—	April 29, 2000	Socorro	LINEAR	·	1.3 km	MPC · JPL
60835	2000 HU_{49}	—	April 29, 2000	Socorro	LINEAR	MAS	1.9 km	MPC · JPL
60836	2000 HZ_{49}	—	April 29, 2000	Socorro	LINEAR	·	8.2 km	MPC · JPL
60837	2000 HU_{53}	—	April 29, 2000	Socorro	LINEAR	·	1.8 km	MPC · JPL
60838	2000 HD_{55}	—	April 29, 2000	Socorro	LINEAR	THM	7.2 km	MPC · JPL
60839	2000 HB_{56}	—	April 24, 2000	Anderson Mesa	LONEOS	·	2.3 km	MPC · JPL
60840	2000 HD_{57}	—	April 24, 2000	Anderson Mesa	LONEOS	·	1.7 km	MPC · JPL
60841	2000 HN_{57}	—	April 24, 2000	Anderson Mesa	LONEOS	·	7.3 km	MPC · JPL
60842	2000 HP_{61}	—	April 25, 2000	Anderson Mesa	LONEOS	·	3.2 km	MPC · JPL
60843	2000 HS_{61}	—	April 25, 2000	Anderson Mesa	LONEOS	·	1.8 km	MPC · JPL
60844	2000 HF_{62}	—	April 25, 2000	Kitt Peak	Spacewatch	·	940 m	MPC · JPL
60845	2000 HP_{62}	—	April 25, 2000	Kitt Peak	Spacewatch	·	2.5 km	MPC · JPL
60846	2000 HB_{63}	—	April 26, 2000	Anderson Mesa	LONEOS	·	2.1 km	MPC · JPL
60847	2000 HC_{64}	—	April 26, 2000	Anderson Mesa	LONEOS	·	2.2 km	MPC · JPL
60848	2000 HQ_{64}	—	April 26, 2000	Anderson Mesa	LONEOS	(5)	3.1 km	MPC · JPL
60849	2000 HV_{64}	—	April 26, 2000	Anderson Mesa	LONEOS	·	1.3 km	MPC · JPL
60850	2000 HE_{65}	—	April 26, 2000	Anderson Mesa	LONEOS	·	3.4 km	MPC · JPL
60851	2000 HN_{65}	—	April 26, 2000	Anderson Mesa	LONEOS	·	2.7 km	MPC · JPL
60852	2000 HU_{65}	—	April 26, 2000	Anderson Mesa	LONEOS	·	3.3 km	MPC · JPL
60853	2000 HZ_{65}	—	April 26, 2000	Anderson Mesa	LONEOS	·	2.1 km	MPC · JPL
60854	2000 HE_{66}	—	April 26, 2000	Anderson Mesa	LONEOS	·	4.2 km	MPC · JPL
60855	2000 HU_{66}	—	April 26, 2000	Kitt Peak	Spacewatch	·	1.6 km	MPC · JPL
60856	2000 HA_{68}	—	April 27, 2000	Socorro	LINEAR	V	1.6 km	MPC · JPL
60857	2000 HD_{68}	—	April 27, 2000	Anderson Mesa	LONEOS	EUN	2.5 km	MPC · JPL
60858	2000 HE_{68}	—	April 27, 2000	Anderson Mesa	LONEOS	PHO	5.5 km	MPC · JPL
60859	2000 HF_{68}	—	April 27, 2000	Socorro	LINEAR	·	1.8 km	MPC · JPL
60860	2000 HR_{72}	—	April 26, 2000	Anderson Mesa	LONEOS	V	970 m	MPC · JPL
60861	2000 HJ_{73}	—	April 27, 2000	Anderson Mesa	LONEOS	·	3.7 km	MPC · JPL
60862	2000 HJ_{74}	—	April 30, 2000	Kitt Peak	Spacewatch	·	1.9 km	MPC · JPL
60863	2000 HK_{75}	—	April 27, 2000	Socorro	LINEAR	·	2.5 km	MPC · JPL
60864	2000 HM_{75}	—	April 27, 2000	Socorro	LINEAR	·	11 km	MPC · JPL
60865	2000 HG_{76}	—	April 27, 2000	Socorro	LINEAR	·	1.7 km	MPC · JPL
60866	2000 HM_{79}	—	April 28, 2000	Socorro	LINEAR	·	2.6 km	MPC · JPL
60867	2000 HD_{81}	—	April 28, 2000	Socorro	LINEAR	·	2.7 km	MPC · JPL
60868	2000 HG_{81}	—	April 28, 2000	Anderson Mesa	LONEOS	PHO	4.0 km	MPC · JPL
60869	2000 HZ_{82}	—	April 29, 2000	Socorro	LINEAR	·	5.7 km	MPC · JPL
60870	2000 HC_{83}	—	April 29, 2000	Socorro	LINEAR	·	1.5 km	MPC · JPL
60871	2000 HE_{83}	—	April 29, 2000	Socorro	LINEAR	·	1.6 km	MPC · JPL
60872	2000 HE_{86}	—	April 30, 2000	Anderson Mesa	LONEOS	DOR	7.1 km	MPC · JPL
60873	2000 HL_{86}	—	April 30, 2000	Anderson Mesa	LONEOS	·	2.4 km	MPC · JPL
60874	2000 HT_{86}	—	April 30, 2000	Anderson Mesa	LONEOS	·	4.2 km	MPC · JPL
60875	2000 HV_{86}	—	April 30, 2000	Anderson Mesa	LONEOS	·	2.2 km	MPC · JPL
60876	2000 HD_{88}	—	April 27, 2000	Socorro	LINEAR	·	10 km	MPC · JPL
60877	2000 HD_{89}	—	April 29, 2000	Socorro	LINEAR	MAS	1.5 km	MPC · JPL
60878	2000 HW_{89}	—	April 29, 2000	Socorro	LINEAR	·	1.7 km	MPC · JPL
60879	2000 HE_{90}	—	April 29, 2000	Socorro	LINEAR	(5)	2.9 km	MPC · JPL
60880	2000 HG_{90}	—	April 29, 2000	Socorro	LINEAR	·	2.6 km	MPC · JPL
60881	2000 HE_{94}	—	April 29, 2000	Socorro	LINEAR	·	1.4 km	MPC · JPL
60882	2000 HM_{95}	—	April 28, 2000	Socorro	LINEAR	·	2.4 km	MPC · JPL
60883	2000 HK_{101}	—	April 26, 2000	Anderson Mesa	LONEOS	·	3.2 km	MPC · JPL
60884	2000 JH_{6}	—	May 3, 2000	Socorro	LINEAR	·	1.9 km	MPC · JPL
60885	2000 JX_{6}	—	May 4, 2000	Socorro	LINEAR	·	7.6 km	MPC · JPL
60886	2000 JB_{10}	—	May 6, 2000	Socorro	LINEAR	·	1.6 km	MPC · JPL
60887	2000 JS_{12}	—	May 6, 2000	Socorro	LINEAR	·	1.6 km	MPC · JPL
60888	2000 JA_{14}	—	May 9, 2000	Socorro	LINEAR	·	2.7 km	MPC · JPL
60889	2000 JC_{15}	—	May 6, 2000	Socorro	LINEAR	·	2.2 km	MPC · JPL
60890	2000 JK_{17}	—	May 5, 2000	Socorro	LINEAR	·	1.3 km	MPC · JPL
60891	2000 JL_{18}	—	May 3, 2000	Socorro	LINEAR	·	2.0 km	MPC · JPL
60892	2000 JH_{19}	—	May 4, 2000	Socorro	LINEAR	·	4.1 km	MPC · JPL
60893	2000 JH_{21}	—	May 6, 2000	Socorro	LINEAR	·	3.8 km	MPC · JPL
60894	2000 JP_{21}	—	May 6, 2000	Socorro	LINEAR	·	1.9 km	MPC · JPL
60895	2000 JM_{22}	—	May 6, 2000	Socorro	LINEAR	·	1.6 km	MPC · JPL
60896	2000 JB_{23}	—	May 7, 2000	Socorro	LINEAR	ADE	7.5 km	MPC · JPL
60897	2000 JP_{24}	—	May 7, 2000	Socorro	LINEAR	·	1.8 km	MPC · JPL
60898	2000 JQ_{25}	—	May 7, 2000	Socorro	LINEAR	·	1.6 km	MPC · JPL
60899	2000 JN_{26}	—	May 7, 2000	Socorro	LINEAR	V	2.1 km	MPC · JPL
60900	2000 JR_{26}	—	May 7, 2000	Socorro	LINEAR	ERI	5.0 km	MPC · JPL

== 60901–61000 ==
back to top

Designation			Discovery			Properties		Ref
Permanent	Provisional	Named after	Date	Site	Discoverer(s)	Category	Diam.	Ref
60901	2000 JX_{26}	—	May 7, 2000	Socorro	LINEAR	·	1.9 km	MPC · JPL
60902	2000 JX_{27}	—	May 7, 2000	Socorro	LINEAR	HYG	7.2 km	MPC · JPL
60903	2000 JS_{28}	—	May 7, 2000	Socorro	LINEAR	·	3.2 km	MPC · JPL
60904	2000 JG_{29}	—	May 7, 2000	Socorro	LINEAR	·	1.5 km	MPC · JPL
60905	2000 JP_{29}	—	May 7, 2000	Socorro	LINEAR	·	1.8 km	MPC · JPL
60906	2000 JG_{30}	—	May 7, 2000	Socorro	LINEAR	·	4.0 km	MPC · JPL
60907	2000 JL_{30}	—	May 7, 2000	Socorro	LINEAR	·	2.2 km	MPC · JPL
60908	2000 JP_{30}	—	May 7, 2000	Socorro	LINEAR	NYS ·	4.2 km	MPC · JPL
60909	2000 JH_{31}	—	May 7, 2000	Socorro	LINEAR	V	1.9 km	MPC · JPL
60910	2000 JJ_{31}	—	May 7, 2000	Socorro	LINEAR	NYS	2.0 km	MPC · JPL
60911	2000 JO_{31}	—	May 7, 2000	Socorro	LINEAR	·	1.9 km	MPC · JPL
60912	2000 JJ_{33}	—	May 7, 2000	Socorro	LINEAR	·	2.2 km	MPC · JPL
60913	2000 JR_{34}	—	May 7, 2000	Socorro	LINEAR	·	2.9 km	MPC · JPL
60914	2000 JL_{35}	—	May 7, 2000	Socorro	LINEAR	·	2.2 km	MPC · JPL
60915	2000 JT_{35}	—	May 7, 2000	Socorro	LINEAR	·	2.7 km	MPC · JPL
60916	2000 JL_{37}	—	May 7, 2000	Socorro	LINEAR	·	3.0 km	MPC · JPL
60917	2000 JK_{38}	—	May 7, 2000	Socorro	LINEAR	·	1.2 km	MPC · JPL
60918	2000 JZ_{38}	—	May 7, 2000	Socorro	LINEAR	·	1.3 km	MPC · JPL
60919	2000 JY_{39}	—	May 7, 2000	Socorro	LINEAR	·	2.5 km	MPC · JPL
60920	2000 JV_{40}	—	May 6, 2000	Socorro	LINEAR	·	3.4 km	MPC · JPL
60921	2000 JY_{40}	—	May 6, 2000	Socorro	LINEAR	·	2.0 km	MPC · JPL
60922	2000 JF_{41}	—	May 6, 2000	Socorro	LINEAR	NYS	3.5 km	MPC · JPL
60923	2000 JR_{43}	—	May 7, 2000	Socorro	LINEAR	NYS ·	4.6 km	MPC · JPL
60924	2000 JF_{44}	—	May 7, 2000	Socorro	LINEAR	·	1.7 km	MPC · JPL
60925	2000 JB_{45}	—	May 7, 2000	Socorro	LINEAR	·	2.9 km	MPC · JPL
60926	2000 JH_{45}	—	May 7, 2000	Socorro	LINEAR	·	10 km	MPC · JPL
60927	2000 JQ_{45}	—	May 7, 2000	Socorro	LINEAR	·	6.7 km	MPC · JPL
60928	2000 JR_{45}	—	May 7, 2000	Socorro	LINEAR	·	1.7 km	MPC · JPL
60929	2000 JO_{46}	—	May 7, 2000	Socorro	LINEAR	·	2.5 km	MPC · JPL
60930	2000 JX_{46}	—	May 9, 2000	Socorro	LINEAR	·	7.0 km	MPC · JPL
60931	2000 JH_{47}	—	May 9, 2000	Socorro	LINEAR	·	3.0 km	MPC · JPL
60932	2000 JY_{49}	—	May 9, 2000	Socorro	LINEAR	·	3.6 km	MPC · JPL
60933	2000 JK_{51}	—	May 9, 2000	Socorro	LINEAR	·	2.1 km	MPC · JPL
60934	2000 JL_{51}	—	May 9, 2000	Socorro	LINEAR	CYB	7.3 km	MPC · JPL
60935	2000 JN_{51}	—	May 9, 2000	Socorro	LINEAR	·	2.1 km	MPC · JPL
60936	2000 JT_{52}	—	May 9, 2000	Socorro	LINEAR	·	3.0 km	MPC · JPL
60937	2000 JQ_{53}	—	May 9, 2000	Socorro	LINEAR	·	5.3 km	MPC · JPL
60938	2000 JF_{54}	—	May 6, 2000	Socorro	LINEAR	·	1.3 km	MPC · JPL
60939	2000 JH_{54}	—	May 6, 2000	Socorro	LINEAR	NYS	2.7 km	MPC · JPL
60940	2000 JJ_{54}	—	May 6, 2000	Socorro	LINEAR	·	2.6 km	MPC · JPL
60941	2000 JQ_{54}	—	May 6, 2000	Socorro	LINEAR	·	2.1 km	MPC · JPL
60942	2000 JZ_{54}	—	May 6, 2000	Socorro	LINEAR	·	3.2 km	MPC · JPL
60943	2000 JV_{55}	—	May 6, 2000	Socorro	LINEAR	·	2.7 km	MPC · JPL
60944	2000 JB_{56}	—	May 6, 2000	Socorro	LINEAR	·	3.9 km	MPC · JPL
60945	2000 JV_{56}	—	May 6, 2000	Socorro	LINEAR	·	1.9 km	MPC · JPL
60946	2000 JY_{57}	—	May 6, 2000	Socorro	LINEAR	·	3.0 km	MPC · JPL
60947	2000 JH_{58}	—	May 6, 2000	Socorro	LINEAR	·	4.8 km	MPC · JPL
60948	2000 JE_{61}	—	May 7, 2000	Socorro	LINEAR	·	5.0 km	MPC · JPL
60949	2000 JM_{61}	—	May 7, 2000	Socorro	LINEAR	slow?	2.0 km	MPC · JPL
60950	2000 JP_{61}	—	May 7, 2000	Socorro	LINEAR	·	3.4 km	MPC · JPL
60951	2000 JA_{62}	—	May 7, 2000	Socorro	LINEAR	·	4.1 km	MPC · JPL
60952	2000 JM_{62}	—	May 9, 2000	Socorro	LINEAR	EUN	2.7 km	MPC · JPL
60953	2000 JT_{62}	—	May 9, 2000	Socorro	LINEAR	·	11 km	MPC · JPL
60954	2000 JF_{63}	—	May 9, 2000	Socorro	LINEAR	·	3.4 km	MPC · JPL
60955	2000 JG_{65}	—	May 5, 2000	Socorro	LINEAR	·	1.7 km	MPC · JPL
60956	2000 JT_{69}	—	May 2, 2000	Socorro	LINEAR	PHO	2.4 km	MPC · JPL
60957	2000 JD_{71}	—	May 1, 2000	Anderson Mesa	LONEOS	·	3.5 km	MPC · JPL
60958	2000 JD_{72}	—	May 1, 2000	Kitt Peak	Spacewatch	·	1.2 km	MPC · JPL
60959	2000 JH_{73}	—	May 2, 2000	Anderson Mesa	LONEOS	·	2.3 km	MPC · JPL
60960	2000 JC_{74}	—	May 3, 2000	Kitt Peak	Spacewatch	·	3.3 km	MPC · JPL
60961	2000 JY_{74}	—	May 4, 2000	Kitt Peak	Spacewatch	·	2.3 km	MPC · JPL
60962	2000 JB_{76}	—	May 6, 2000	Socorro	LINEAR	·	1.3 km	MPC · JPL
60963	2000 JL_{76}	—	May 6, 2000	Socorro	LINEAR	NYS	1.9 km	MPC · JPL
60964	2000 JS_{76}	—	May 7, 2000	Socorro	LINEAR	·	2.9 km	MPC · JPL
60965	2000 JA_{77}	—	May 7, 2000	Socorro	LINEAR	·	1.9 km	MPC · JPL
60966	2000 JH_{80}	—	May 6, 2000	Kitt Peak	Spacewatch	·	1.3 km	MPC · JPL
60967	2000 JJ_{80}	—	May 6, 2000	Kitt Peak	Spacewatch	·	2.3 km	MPC · JPL
60968	2000 JY_{82}	—	May 7, 2000	Socorro	LINEAR	·	1.5 km	MPC · JPL
60969	2000 JO_{83}	—	May 6, 2000	Socorro	LINEAR	MAS	1.4 km	MPC · JPL
60970	2000 JA_{85}	—	May 5, 2000	Socorro	LINEAR	·	3.8 km	MPC · JPL
60971	2000 JM_{85}	—	May 3, 2000	Kitt Peak	Spacewatch	·	1.4 km	MPC · JPL
60972 Matenko	2000 KN	Matenko	May 23, 2000	Modra	A. Galád, P. Kolény	EUN	3.2 km	MPC · JPL
60973	2000 KC_{2}	—	May 26, 2000	Socorro	LINEAR	PHO	3.6 km	MPC · JPL
60974	2000 KC_{3}	—	May 25, 2000	Kitt Peak	Spacewatch	(2076)	2.7 km	MPC · JPL
60975	2000 KR_{3}	—	May 27, 2000	Socorro	LINEAR	·	3.0 km	MPC · JPL
60976	2000 KW_{5}	—	May 27, 2000	Socorro	LINEAR	·	2.7 km	MPC · JPL
60977	2000 KE_{6}	—	May 27, 2000	Socorro	LINEAR	·	1.3 km	MPC · JPL
60978	2000 KP_{7}	—	May 27, 2000	Socorro	LINEAR	·	6.7 km	MPC · JPL
60979	2000 KW_{7}	—	May 27, 2000	Socorro	LINEAR	V	2.2 km	MPC · JPL
60980	2000 KF_{9}	—	May 28, 2000	Socorro	LINEAR	NYS ·	4.7 km	MPC · JPL
60981	2000 KP_{12}	—	May 28, 2000	Socorro	LINEAR	·	1.7 km	MPC · JPL
60982	2000 KO_{13}	—	May 28, 2000	Socorro	LINEAR	·	1.7 km	MPC · JPL
60983	2000 KP_{13}	—	May 28, 2000	Socorro	LINEAR	·	2.0 km	MPC · JPL
60984	2000 KQ_{13}	—	May 28, 2000	Socorro	LINEAR	·	5.3 km	MPC · JPL
60985	2000 KW_{14}	—	May 28, 2000	Socorro	LINEAR	·	6.5 km	MPC · JPL
60986	2000 KN_{17}	—	May 28, 2000	Socorro	LINEAR	·	3.2 km	MPC · JPL
60987	2000 KW_{18}	—	May 28, 2000	Socorro	LINEAR	VER	6.7 km	MPC · JPL
60988	2000 KR_{19}	—	May 28, 2000	Socorro	LINEAR	·	2.2 km	MPC · JPL
60989	2000 KJ_{22}	—	May 28, 2000	Socorro	LINEAR	·	1.5 km	MPC · JPL
60990	2000 KU_{22}	—	May 28, 2000	Socorro	LINEAR	·	3.8 km	MPC · JPL
60991	2000 KK_{24}	—	May 28, 2000	Socorro	LINEAR	·	2.5 km	MPC · JPL
60992	2000 KO_{24}	—	May 28, 2000	Socorro	LINEAR	V	1.7 km	MPC · JPL
60993	2000 KP_{24}	—	May 28, 2000	Socorro	LINEAR	·	2.0 km	MPC · JPL
60994	2000 KA_{26}	—	May 28, 2000	Socorro	LINEAR	·	1.7 km	MPC · JPL
60995	2000 KD_{26}	—	May 28, 2000	Socorro	LINEAR	·	1.4 km	MPC · JPL
60996	2000 KK_{26}	—	May 28, 2000	Socorro	LINEAR	·	1.8 km	MPC · JPL
60997	2000 KU_{27}	—	May 28, 2000	Socorro	LINEAR	·	2.2 km	MPC · JPL
60998	2000 KE_{28}	—	May 28, 2000	Socorro	LINEAR	·	2.0 km	MPC · JPL
60999	2000 KC_{30}	—	May 28, 2000	Socorro	LINEAR	·	1.5 km	MPC · JPL
61000	2000 KD_{31}	—	May 28, 2000	Socorro	LINEAR	(5)	3.3 km	MPC · JPL

back to top

== See also ==
- Meanings of minor-planet names: 60001–61000
