= Lenka Kotková =

Czech astronomer, asteroid discoverer (born 1973)

Lenka Kotková (née Šarounová)
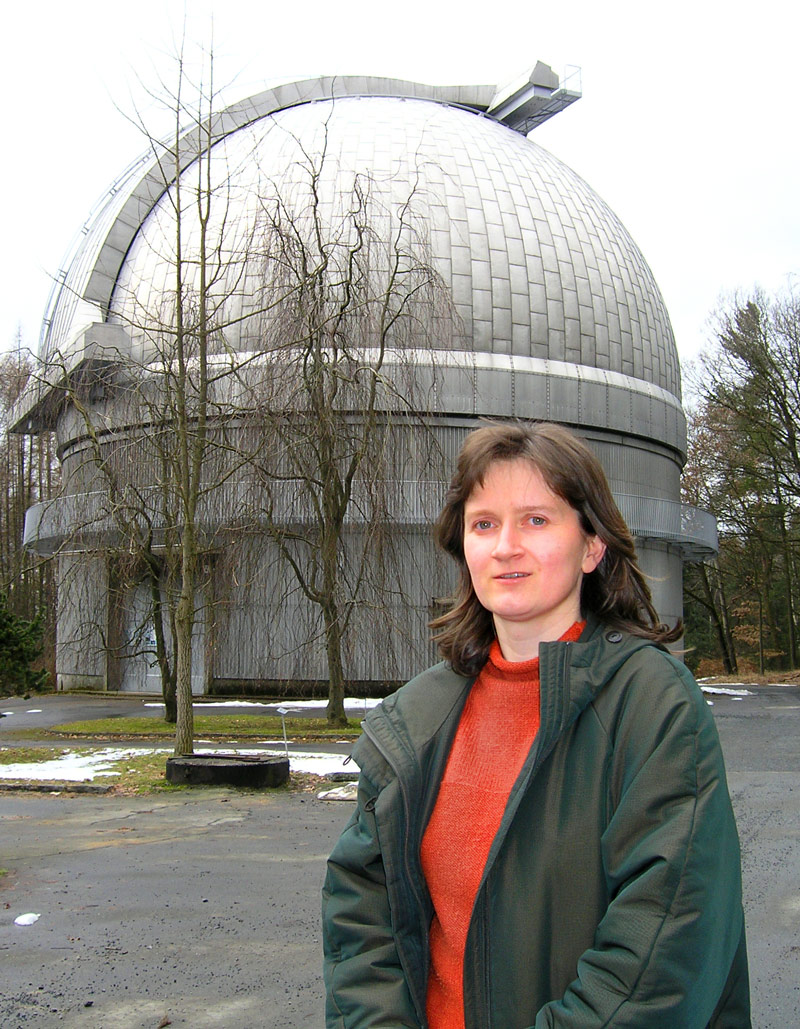
- Lenka Kotková at the Ondřejov Observatory
- Born: 26 July 1973 (age 53); Dobřichovice, Czechoslovakia
- Education: Charles University of Prague
- Known for: discoverer of minor planets
- Awards: Cena Zdeňka Kvíze
- Scientific career
- Fields: Astronomer
- Workplaces: Astronomical Institute AV ČR in Ondřejov

Minor planets discovered: 258
see § List of discovered minor planets

Lenka Kotková (née Šarounová; born 26 July 1973) is a Czech astronomer and a discoverer of minor planets.

She works at Observatoř Ondřejov (Ondřejov Observatory), located near Prague. Besides numerous main-belt asteroids she also discovered Mars-crosser asteroid 9671 Hemera and Hilda family asteroid 21804 Václavneumann.

Lenka Kotková studied meteorology at the faculty of Mathematics and Physics of the Charles University in Prague. Her tasks at the Astronomical institute AV ČR in Ondřejov are primarily the development of databases, spectroscopical and photometric observation, and data processing. During her work at the department of inter planetary matter her main role was the observation of near-earth asteroids, along with Petr Pravec and Peter Kušnirák she identified a large proportion of known binary asteroids. In the same time period she discovered or co-discovered over one hundred asteroids. At the present time Lenka Kotková works in the stellar department as an observant with a two-metre Ondřejov telescope.

In the year 2000 she received the Zdeněk Kvíz Award of the Czech Astronomical Society for significant work in the research of variable stars.

The asteroid 10390 Lenka, discovered by her colleagues Petr Pravec and Marek Wolf in 1997, is named after her. The asteroid 60001 Adélka, discovered by her in 1999, is named after her daughter, while 7897 Bohuška, discovered by her in 1995, is named after her mother.

== List of discovered minor planets ==
important; height: 324px;
7670 Kabeláč	20 August 1995	list
7849 Janjosefrič	18 April 1996	list^{[B]}
7897 Bohuška	12 March 1995	list
8217 Dominikhašek	21 April 1995	list^{[B]}
8229 Kozelský	28 December 1996	list^{[C]}
8557 Šaroun	23 July 1995	list
9449 Petrbondy	4 November 1997	list
9671 Hemera	5 October 1997	list
10173 Hanzelkazikmund	21 April 1995	list^{[B]}
10215 Lavilledemirmont	20 September 1997	list
10626 Zajíc	10 January 1998	list
10634 Pepibican	8 April 1998	list

important; height: 324px;
10919 Pepíkzicha	10 January 1998	list
11101 Českáfilharmonie	17 September 1995	list
11201 Talich	13 March 1999	list
11325 Slavický	17 September 1995	list
11326 Ladislavschmied	17 September 1995	list
11333 Forman	20 April 1996	list^{[B]}
(11388) 1998 VU_{4}	11 November 1998	list
11408 Zahradník	13 March 1999	list
11598 Kubík	22 July 1995	list
11736 Viktorfischl	19 August 1998	list
12002 Suess	19 March 1996	list^{[B]}
12006 Hruschka	20 July 1996	list

important; height: 324px;
12051 Pícha	2 May 1997	list
(12054) 1997 TT_{9}	5 October 1997	list
12468 Zachotín	14 January 1997	list
(12781) 1995 EA_{8}	12 March 1995	list
13226 Soulié	20 September 1997	list
13406 Sekora	2 October 1999	list
14124 Kamil	28 August 1998	list
14550 Lehký	27 October 1997	list
14980 Gustavbrom	5 October 1997	list
15382 Vian	20 September 1997	list
15392 Budějický	11 October 1997	list
15403 Merignac	9 November 1997	list

important; height: 324px;
15898 Kharasterteam	26 August 1997	list^{[B]}
15902 Dostál	13 September 1997	list
15917 Rosahavel	28 October 1997	list
15925 Rokycany	10 November 1997	list
17600 Dobřichovice	18 September 1995	list
17625 Joseflada	14 January 1996	list^{[B]}
18460 Pecková	5 August 1995	list
18838 Shannon	18 July 1999	list^{[D]}
19291 Karelzeman	6 June 1996	list^{[B]}
19364 Semafor	21 September 1997	list
20496 Jeník	22 August 1999	list
20497 Mařenka	4 September 1999	list

important; height: 324px;
21229 Sušil	22 September 1995	list
21655 Niklauswirth	8 August 1999	list
21664 Konradzuse	4 September 1999	list
21801 Ančerl	2 October 1999	list
21804 Václavneumann	4 October 1999	list
21985 Šejna	2 December 1999	list
22505 Lewit	19 October 1997	list
22697 Mánek	7 September 1998	list
23583 Křivský	22 September 1995	list
23648 Kolář	1 February 1997	list
(23710) 1997 UJ	20 October 1997	list
24046 Malovany	2 October 1999	list

important; height: 324px;
24829 Berounurbi	22 September 1995	list
24967 Frištenský	14 January 1998	list
25358 Boskovice	2 October 1999	list
26897 Červená	5 August 1995	list
26986 Čáslavská	4 November 1997	list
27132 Ježek	11 December 1998	list^{[B]}
27344 Vesevlada	26 February 2000	list
27960 Dobiáš	21 September 1997	list
27974 Drejsl	19 October 1997	list
27978 Lubosluka	29 October 1997	list
27986 Hanuš	4 November 1997	list
28019 Warchal	14 January 1998	list

important; height: 324px;
28107 Sapar	22 September 1998	list
29419 Mládková	13 January 1997	list
29456 Evakrchová	24 September 1997	list
29471 Spejbl	27 October 1997	list
29472 Hurvínek	27 October 1997	list
29473 Krejčí	21 October 1997	list^{[B]}
29484 Honzaveselý	9 November 1997	list
29528 Kaplinski	10 January 1998	list
(31027) 1996 HQ_{1}	18 April 1996	list
31324 Jiřímrázek	27 April 1998	list
33058 Kovařík	22 October 1997	list^{[B]}
35237 Matzner	23 August 1995	list

important; height: 324px;
35356 Vondrák	25 September 1997	list^{[B]}
(35367) 1997 UW_{7}	28 October 1997	list
(35459) 1998 DG_{20}	27 February 1998	list
(36055) 1999 RP_{31}	5 September 1999	list
(36174) 1999 SW_{2}	23 September 1999	list^{[C]}
(36184) 1999 TQ_{17}	14 October 1999	list
36226 Mackerras	31 October 1999	list
36235 Sergebaudo	1 November 1999	list
37939 Hašler	16 April 1998	list
(38240) 1999 PB_{1}	8 August 1999	list
38674 Těšínsko	9 August 2000	list
(39802) 1997 UO_{9}	29 October 1997	list

important; height: 324px;
(40137) 1998 QO_{60}	28 August 1998	list
40410 Příhoda	4 September 1999	list
(40718) 1999 SU_{2}	21 September 1999	list
(41222) 1999 XH_{15}	2 December 1999	list
(41473) 2000 PU_{9}	9 August 2000	list
(44234) 1998 QE_{29}	26 August 1998	list
(44712) 1999 TJ_{5}	4 October 1999	list
(44853) 1999 UR_{4}	31 October 1999	list
46722 Ireneadler	2 September 1997	list^{[B]}
(46860) 1998 QP_{60}	27 August 1998	list
(48629) 1995 SP	18 September 1995	list
(48694) 1996 HP	18 April 1996	list

important; height: 324px;
(48781) 1997 SL	20 September 1997	list
48782 Fierz	20 September 1997	list
49110 Květafialová	16 September 1998	list^{[B]}
(49247) 1998 TL_{6}	13 October 1998	list
51261 Holuša	13 May 2000	list
(51323) 2000 LQ_{8}	4 June 2000	list
(52597) 1997 RM_{9}	15 September 1997	list
(52603) 1997 TV_{9}	5 October 1997	list
(52608) 1997 TM_{19}	10 October 1997	list
(53057) 1998 XZ_{16}	10 December 1998	list
(53263) 1999 FW_{6}	25 March 1999	list
(55860) 1997 BQ_{6}	31 January 1997	list

important; height: 324px;
(58372) 1995 SQ	18 September 1995	list
58440 Zdeněkstuchlík	21 April 1996	list^{[B]}
(58494) 1996 UF_{1}	19 October 1996	list
58578 Žídek	24 September 1997	list
58579 Ehrenberg	24 September 1997	list
(58602) 1997 TG_{25}	11 October 1997	list
(58818) 1998 HE_{2}	20 April 1998	list
(59237) 1999 CF_{2}	8 February 1999	list
60000 Miminko	2 October 1999	list
60001 Adélka	4 October 1999	list
60008 Jarda	14 October 1999	list
(63446) 2001 NV_{9}	15 July 2001	list

important; height: 324px;
(63687) 2001 QH_{154}	30 August 2001	list
(67713) 2000 UF_{1}	22 October 2000	list
(69950) 1998 VW_{4}	12 November 1998	list
(70180) 1999 QM_{2}	31 August 1999	list
(70433) 1999 TS_{3}	2 October 1999	list
(70448) 1999 TS_{15}	7 October 1999	list^{[D]}
(70681) 1999 US_{4}	31 October 1999	list
(70722) 1999 VY	1 November 1999	list
72447 Polińska	16 February 2001	list^{[B]}
(73934) 1997 SO_{2}	24 September 1997	list
(74601) 1999 RK_{3}	5 September 1999	list
(79442) 1997 UX	22 October 1997	list

important; height: 324px;
(79753) 1998 TK_{6}	13 October 1998	list
80179 Václavknoll	1 November 1999	list
81971 Turonclavere	22 August 2000	list^{[E]}
82464 Jaroslavboček	21 July 2001	list^{[B]}
(85330) 1995 QO	23 August 1995	list
(85479) 1997 NF_{3}	9 July 1997	list
(85503) 1997 TF_{25}	10 October 1997	list
(85509) 1997 UY_{7}	28 October 1997	list
(85841) 1998 YR_{6}	20 December 1998	list^{[F]}
(90819) 1995 SN	18 September 1995	list
90936 Neronet	11 October 1997	list
90937 Josefdufek	11 October 1997	list

important; height: 324px;
(91215) 1999 AN	5 January 1999	list^{[G]}
(91431) 1999 RQ	3 September 1999	list
(91574) 1999 SV_{2}	22 September 1999	list
(91592) 1999 TU_{3}	2 October 1999	list
(91850) 1999 UN_{7}	31 October 1999	list
(92064) 1999 WA_{13}	26 November 1999	list
(92440) 2000 KG_{1}	24 May 2000	list
(94258) 2001 CZ_{36}	14 February 2001	list
(94266) 2001 DO	16 February 2001	list^{[B]}
(96328) 1997 GC	2 April 1997	list
(96349) 1997 US_{7}	23 October 1997	list
(96356) 1997 VH_{8}	10 November 1997	list

important; height: 324px;
(96603) 1998 YH_{12}	20 December 1998	list^{[F]}
(98095) 2000 RQ_{77}	8 September 2000	list
(98096) 2000 RR_{77}	8 September 2000	list
98127 Vilgusová	24 September 2000	list^{[B]}
(99919) 1999 RR_{31}	8 September 1999	list
100308 ČAS	21 April 1995	list^{[B]}
(100522) 1997 CA	1 February 1997	list
(101495) 1998 XJ_{3}	10 December 1998	list
(101903) 1999 RR	3 September 1999	list
(102215) 1999 TR_{3}	2 October 1999	list
(102531) 1999 UP_{4}	31 October 1999	list
(106172) 2000 UF	19 October 2000	list

important; height: 324px;
(108305) 2001 JX	11 May 2001	list
(108306) 2001 JZ	11 May 2001	list
(108641) 2001 NU_{9}	15 July 2001	list
(118413) 1999 SP_{1}	19 September 1999	list
(119083) 2001 NT_{9}	15 July 2001	list
(120736) 1997 TA_{17}	9 October 1997	list
(120742) 1997 VW_{1}	4 November 1997	list
(121004) 1998 YQ_{27}	29 December 1998	list
(121210) 1999 QG_{2}	25 August 1999	list
(121322) 1999 SQ_{1}	19 September 1999	list
(122280) 2000 PQ_{8}	8 August 2000	list
(123851) 2001 CB_{37}	14 February 2001	list

important; height: 324px;
(129829) 1999 RP	3 September 1999	list
(129884) 1999 TB_{4}	2 October 1999	list
131181 Žebrák	15 February 2001	list^{[B]}
(131352) 2001 JA_{1}	11 May 2001	list
(134441) 1998 SK_{36}	27 September 1998	list
(136823) 1997 QR	26 August 1997	list
(137076) 1998 XK_{3}	10 December 1998	list
(137497) 1999 VH	1 November 1999	list
(138654) 2000 RP_{77}	8 September 2000	list
(138980) 2001 CY_{36}	14 February 2001	list
(150162) 1997 SO	20 September 1997	list
(150275) 1999 TR_{16}	14 October 1999	list

important; height: 324px;
(152592) 1995 SK_{1}	22 September 1995	list
(152627) 1997 DF	26 February 1997	list
(152818) 1999 UK_{4}	29 October 1999	list
(155395) 1995 SA_{5}	25 September 1995	list
(157825) 1997 RE_{8}	12 September 1997	list^{[C]}
(157872) 1999 GJ_{6}	14 April 1999	list
(160697) 2000 LB_{15}	4 June 2000	list
(162095) 1998 QC_{29}	25 August 1998	list
(162187) 1999 QR_{2}	31 August 1999	list
(162478) 2000 OT_{9}	31 July 2000	list
(164688) 1997 SO_{1}	21 September 1997	list
(171512) 1998 RP_{20}	14 September 1998	list

important; height: 324px;
(173275) 1999 TQ_{16}	14 October 1999	list
(178846) 2001 JT	10 May 2001	list
(181884) 1999 RS_{28}	8 September 1999	list
(181905) 1999 SR_{1}	20 September 1999	list
(187809) 1999 TS_{16}	14 October 1999	list
(189458) 1999 RO_{31}	4 September 1999	list
(190314) 1997 VU_{1}	1 November 1997	list^{[B]}
(190325) 1998 QQ_{60}	27 August 1998	list
(192636) 1999 QL_{2}	31 August 1999	list
(193631) 2001 CA_{37}	14 February 2001	list
(193870) 2001 QF_{154}	29 August 2001	list^{[C]}
(200183) 1999 RO	3 September 1999	list

important; height: 324px;
(200359) 2000 PB_{7}	1 August 2000	list^{[B]}
(202951) 1999 RE	3 September 1999	list
(213050) 1998 TS_{3}	12 October 1998	list
(213251) 2001 CS_{41}	15 February 2001	list^{[B]}
(218068) 2002 FX_{1}	18 March 2002	list
(219038) 1995 SK	17 September 1995	list
(234117) 1999 WZ_{12}	26 November 1999	list
(234357) 2001 JA_{5}	13 May 2001	list
(240295) 2003 FK_{2}	23 March 2003	list
(243776) 2000 SH	18 September 2000	list
(246928) 1999 CV_{2}	9 February 1999	list
(246959) 1999 TV_{3}	2 October 1999	list

important; height: 324px;
(269703) 1997 UR_{7}	23 October 1997	list
(270027) 2001 JS	10 May 2001	list
(275565) 1999 SZ_{9}	27 September 1999	list
(279606) 2011 ER_{24}	22 July 2001	list^{[B]}
(280281) 2003 FF_{1}	22 March 2003	list
(282120) 2001 CU_{41}	15 February 2001	list^{[B]}
(285753) 2000 UE_{1}	22 October 2000	list
(322781) 2001 OD_{17}	21 July 2001	list^{[B]}
(344078) 1998 QB_{29}	25 August 1998	list
(350293) 2012 TX_{296}	2 October 1999	list
(366349) 1999 RQ_{31}	5 September 1999	list
(370072) 2001 QA_{154}	28 August 2001	list

important; height: 324px;
(382245) 2012 SU_{51}	25 August 2001	list
(401876) 2001 OH_{17}	22 July 2001	list^{[B]}
(401877) 2001 ON_{32}	22 July 2001	list^{[B]}
(415820) 2001 QJ_{154}	30 August 2001	list
(422664) 1999 TP_{14}	4 October 1999	list
(455217) 2001 QD_{154}	28 August 2001	list^{[C]}
Co-discovery made with:^{B} P. Pravec^{C} M. Wolf^{D} P. Kušnirák^{E} J. Montanne^{F} A. Kolář^{G} L. Vašta
