= List of minor planets: 58001–59000 =

The following is a partial list of minor planets, running from minor-planet number 58001 through 59000, inclusive. The primary data for this and other partial lists is based on JPL's "Small-Body Orbital Elements" and data available from the Minor Planet Center. Critical list information is also provided by the MPC, unless otherwise specified from Lowell Observatory. A detailed description of the table's columns and additional sources are given on the main page including a complete list of every page in this series, and a statistical break-up on the dynamical classification of minor planets.

Also see the summary list of all named bodies in numerical and alphabetical order, and the corresponding naming citations for the number range of this particular list. New namings may only be added to this list after official publication, as the preannouncement of names is condemned by the Working Group for Small Bodies Nomenclature of the International Astronomical Union.

Near-Earth obj.	MBA (inner)	MBA (outer)	Centaur
Mars-crosser	MBA (middle)	Jupiter trojan	Trans-Neptunian obj.
Unclassified

== 58001–58100 ==
Designation			Discovery			Properties		Ref
Permanent	Provisional	Named after	Date	Site	Discoverer(s)	Category	Diam.	Ref
58001	2002 TX_{126}	—	October 4, 2002	Socorro	LINEAR	HOF	6.5 km	MPC · JPL
58002	2002 TM_{175}	—	October 4, 2002	Socorro	LINEAR	·	3.6 km	MPC · JPL
58003	2002 TC_{180}	—	October 14, 2002	Socorro	LINEAR	·	4.0 km	MPC · JPL
58004	2002 TG_{206}	—	October 4, 2002	Socorro	LINEAR	·	1.7 km	MPC · JPL
58005	2002 TR_{207}	—	October 4, 2002	Socorro	LINEAR	·	2.9 km	MPC · JPL
58006	2002 TD_{221}	—	October 6, 2002	Socorro	LINEAR	·	2.8 km	MPC · JPL
58007	2002 TL_{234}	—	October 6, 2002	Socorro	LINEAR	INA	12 km	MPC · JPL
58008	2002 TW_{240}	—	October 6, 2002	Haleakala	NEAT	L5	25 km	MPC · JPL
58009	2002 TU_{262}	—	October 10, 2002	Palomar	NEAT	·	1.9 km	MPC · JPL
58010	2002 TB_{266}	—	October 10, 2002	Socorro	LINEAR	·	2.5 km	MPC · JPL
58011	2002 TW_{280}	—	October 10, 2002	Socorro	LINEAR	VER	8.6 km	MPC · JPL
58012	2002 TM_{290}	—	October 10, 2002	Socorro	LINEAR	·	7.1 km	MPC · JPL
58013	2002 TP_{293}	—	October 10, 2002	Socorro	LINEAR	·	5.0 km	MPC · JPL
58014	2002 US_{28}	—	October 31, 2002	Socorro	LINEAR	·	3.2 km	MPC · JPL
58015	2002 UG_{29}	—	October 31, 2002	Socorro	LINEAR	·	3.5 km	MPC · JPL
58016	2002 UH_{29}	—	October 31, 2002	Socorro	LINEAR	·	5.5 km	MPC · JPL
58017	2002 UC_{34}	—	October 31, 2002	Kitt Peak	Spacewatch	·	3.3 km	MPC · JPL
58018	2002 UX_{37}	—	October 31, 2002	Palomar	NEAT	EOS	4.8 km	MPC · JPL
58019	2002 UV_{40}	—	October 31, 2002	Anderson Mesa	LONEOS	AGN	2.5 km	MPC · JPL
58020	2002 VE_{17}	—	November 5, 2002	Socorro	LINEAR	·	6.1 km	MPC · JPL
58021	2002 VD_{32}	—	November 5, 2002	Socorro	LINEAR	KOR	2.8 km	MPC · JPL
58022	2002 VK_{36}	—	November 5, 2002	Socorro	LINEAR	PHO	3.1 km	MPC · JPL
58023	2002 VR_{40}	—	November 6, 2002	Haleakala	NEAT	·	3.6 km	MPC · JPL
58024	2002 VC_{48}	—	November 5, 2002	Socorro	LINEAR	EOS	5.5 km	MPC · JPL
58025	2002 VW_{48}	—	November 5, 2002	Anderson Mesa	LONEOS	·	1.7 km	MPC · JPL
58026	2002 VS_{55}	—	November 6, 2002	Socorro	LINEAR	·	2.0 km	MPC · JPL
58027	2002 VH_{58}	—	November 6, 2002	Haleakala	NEAT	·	3.6 km	MPC · JPL
58028	2002 VB_{63}	—	November 6, 2002	Socorro	LINEAR	NEM	5.0 km	MPC · JPL
58029	2002 VH_{63}	—	November 6, 2002	Anderson Mesa	LONEOS	slow	4.0 km	MPC · JPL
58030	2002 VU_{67}	—	November 8, 2002	Socorro	LINEAR	·	3.1 km	MPC · JPL
58031	2002 VH_{82}	—	November 7, 2002	Socorro	LINEAR	·	1.5 km	MPC · JPL
58032	2002 VA_{86}	—	November 8, 2002	Socorro	LINEAR	·	6.2 km	MPC · JPL
58033	2002 VB_{88}	—	November 8, 2002	Socorro	LINEAR	·	3.8 km	MPC · JPL
58034	2002 VS_{101}	—	November 11, 2002	Socorro	LINEAR	(5)	2.1 km	MPC · JPL
58035	2002 VK_{107}	—	November 12, 2002	Socorro	LINEAR	·	2.2 km	MPC · JPL
58036	2002 VO_{108}	—	November 12, 2002	Socorro	LINEAR	·	6.5 km	MPC · JPL
58037	2002 VL_{109}	—	November 12, 2002	Socorro	LINEAR	·	4.6 km	MPC · JPL
58038	2002 VJ_{110}	—	November 12, 2002	Socorro	LINEAR	NYS	1.5 km	MPC · JPL
58039	2002 VC_{113}	—	November 13, 2002	Palomar	NEAT	MAS	2.0 km	MPC · JPL
58040	2002 VU_{122}	—	November 13, 2002	Palomar	NEAT	RAF	3.2 km	MPC · JPL
58041	2002 VU_{127}	—	November 14, 2002	Socorro	LINEAR	·	11 km	MPC · JPL
58042	2002 VV_{127}	—	November 14, 2002	Socorro	LINEAR	EUN	6.9 km	MPC · JPL
58043	2002 VJ_{128}	—	November 14, 2002	Socorro	LINEAR	·	3.7 km	MPC · JPL
58044	2002 WF	—	November 17, 2002	Ametlla de Mar	J. Nomen	·	14 km	MPC · JPL
58045	2002 WY_{16}	—	November 28, 2002	Haleakala	NEAT	·	3.0 km	MPC · JPL
58046	2002 XA_{14}	—	December 1, 2002	Haleakala	NEAT	PHO	2.8 km	MPC · JPL
58047	2002 XY_{21}	—	December 2, 2002	Socorro	LINEAR	·	3.9 km	MPC · JPL
58048	2002 XJ_{78}	—	December 11, 2002	Socorro	LINEAR	·	2.9 km	MPC · JPL
58049	2002 XY_{86}	—	December 11, 2002	Socorro	LINEAR	V	1.5 km	MPC · JPL
58050	2002 YA	—	December 18, 2002	Haleakala	NEAT	·	3.0 km	MPC · JPL
58051	2002 YY_{2}	—	December 28, 2002	Ametlla de Mar	Ametlla de Mar	·	4.5 km	MPC · JPL
58052	2003 AN_{1}	—	January 1, 2003	Socorro	LINEAR	EOS	4.1 km	MPC · JPL
58053	2003 AP_{5}	—	January 1, 2003	Socorro	LINEAR	(2076)	2.5 km	MPC · JPL
58054	2003 AR_{5}	—	January 1, 2003	Socorro	LINEAR	·	2.6 km	MPC · JPL
58055	2003 AH_{6}	—	January 1, 2003	Socorro	LINEAR	·	2.2 km	MPC · JPL
58056	2003 AJ_{41}	—	January 7, 2003	Socorro	LINEAR	·	1.6 km	MPC · JPL
58057	2003 AG_{58}	—	January 5, 2003	Socorro	LINEAR	·	5.2 km	MPC · JPL
58058	2118 P-L	—	September 24, 1960	Palomar	C. J. van Houten, I. van Houten-Groeneveld, T. Gehrels	·	2.2 km	MPC · JPL
58059	2690 P-L	—	September 24, 1960	Palomar	C. J. van Houten, I. van Houten-Groeneveld, T. Gehrels	(5)	2.9 km	MPC · JPL
58060	2751 P-L	—	September 24, 1960	Palomar	C. J. van Houten, I. van Houten-Groeneveld, T. Gehrels	THM	6.6 km	MPC · JPL
58061	2769 P-L	—	September 24, 1960	Palomar	C. J. van Houten, I. van Houten-Groeneveld, T. Gehrels	·	2.9 km	MPC · JPL
58062	4034 P-L	—	September 24, 1960	Palomar	C. J. van Houten, I. van Houten-Groeneveld, T. Gehrels	·	1.6 km	MPC · JPL
58063	6024 P-L	—	September 24, 1960	Palomar	C. J. van Houten, I. van Houten-Groeneveld, T. Gehrels	·	6.0 km	MPC · JPL
58064	6220 P-L	—	September 24, 1960	Palomar	C. J. van Houten, I. van Houten-Groeneveld, T. Gehrels	(5)	2.7 km	MPC · JPL
58065	6814 P-L	—	September 24, 1960	Palomar	C. J. van Houten, I. van Houten-Groeneveld, T. Gehrels	·	5.5 km	MPC · JPL
58066	7579 P-L	—	October 17, 1960	Palomar	C. J. van Houten, I. van Houten-Groeneveld, T. Gehrels	·	4.6 km	MPC · JPL
58067	2269 T-1	—	March 25, 1971	Palomar	C. J. van Houten, I. van Houten-Groeneveld, T. Gehrels	·	1.8 km	MPC · JPL
58068	3143 T-1	—	March 26, 1971	Palomar	C. J. van Houten, I. van Houten-Groeneveld, T. Gehrels	·	7.8 km	MPC · JPL
58069	4310 T-1	—	March 26, 1971	Palomar	C. J. van Houten, I. van Houten-Groeneveld, T. Gehrels	·	7.4 km	MPC · JPL
58070	1034 T-2	—	September 29, 1973	Palomar	C. J. van Houten, I. van Houten-Groeneveld, T. Gehrels	·	1.9 km	MPC · JPL
58071	1308 T-2	—	September 29, 1973	Palomar	C. J. van Houten, I. van Houten-Groeneveld, T. Gehrels	·	3.3 km	MPC · JPL
58072	1476 T-2	—	September 30, 1973	Palomar	C. J. van Houten, I. van Houten-Groeneveld, T. Gehrels	·	5.6 km	MPC · JPL
58073	1514 T-2	—	September 29, 1973	Palomar	C. J. van Houten, I. van Houten-Groeneveld, T. Gehrels	·	2.4 km	MPC · JPL
58074	1612 T-2	—	September 24, 1973	Palomar	C. J. van Houten, I. van Houten-Groeneveld, T. Gehrels	·	2.4 km	MPC · JPL
58075	2205 T-2	—	September 29, 1973	Palomar	C. J. van Houten, I. van Houten-Groeneveld, T. Gehrels	THM	6.7 km	MPC · JPL
58076	2208 T-2	—	September 29, 1973	Palomar	C. J. van Houten, I. van Houten-Groeneveld, T. Gehrels	·	1.7 km	MPC · JPL
58077	2209 T-2	—	September 29, 1973	Palomar	C. J. van Houten, I. van Houten-Groeneveld, T. Gehrels	AGN	2.4 km	MPC · JPL
58078	3003 T-2	—	September 30, 1973	Palomar	C. J. van Houten, I. van Houten-Groeneveld, T. Gehrels	·	2.8 km	MPC · JPL
58079	3244 T-2	—	September 30, 1973	Palomar	C. J. van Houten, I. van Houten-Groeneveld, T. Gehrels	·	3.3 km	MPC · JPL
58080	4228 T-2	—	September 29, 1973	Palomar	C. J. van Houten, I. van Houten-Groeneveld, T. Gehrels	PAD	5.4 km	MPC · JPL
58081	4817 T-2	—	September 25, 1973	Palomar	C. J. van Houten, I. van Houten-Groeneveld, T. Gehrels	·	1.6 km	MPC · JPL
58082	5072 T-2	—	September 25, 1973	Palomar	C. J. van Houten, I. van Houten-Groeneveld, T. Gehrels	·	5.6 km	MPC · JPL
58083	5459 T-2	—	September 30, 1973	Palomar	C. J. van Houten, I. van Houten-Groeneveld, T. Gehrels	·	2.4 km	MPC · JPL
58084 Hiketaon	1197 T-3	Hiketaon	October 17, 1977	Palomar	C. J. van Houten, I. van Houten-Groeneveld, T. Gehrels	L5	20 km	MPC · JPL
58085	1199 T-3	—	October 17, 1977	Palomar	C. J. van Houten, I. van Houten-Groeneveld, T. Gehrels	GEF · slow ·	7.8 km	MPC · JPL
58086	2017 T-3	—	October 16, 1977	Palomar	C. J. van Houten, I. van Houten-Groeneveld, T. Gehrels	·	2.8 km	MPC · JPL
58087	2156 T-3	—	October 16, 1977	Palomar	C. J. van Houten, I. van Houten-Groeneveld, T. Gehrels	·	3.1 km	MPC · JPL
58088	2256 T-3	—	October 16, 1977	Palomar	C. J. van Houten, I. van Houten-Groeneveld, T. Gehrels	V	1.6 km	MPC · JPL
58089	2352 T-3	—	October 16, 1977	Palomar	C. J. van Houten, I. van Houten-Groeneveld, T. Gehrels	·	1.6 km	MPC · JPL
58090	3452 T-3	—	October 16, 1977	Palomar	C. J. van Houten, I. van Houten-Groeneveld, T. Gehrels	·	2.2 km	MPC · JPL
58091	3768 T-3	—	October 16, 1977	Palomar	C. J. van Houten, I. van Houten-Groeneveld, T. Gehrels	·	6.7 km	MPC · JPL
58092	4053 T-3	—	October 16, 1977	Palomar	C. J. van Houten, I. van Houten-Groeneveld, T. Gehrels	·	8.4 km	MPC · JPL
58093	1934 JP	—	May 9, 1934	Mount Hamilton	H. M. Jeffers	·	1.9 km	MPC · JPL
58094	1972 AP	—	January 14, 1972	Hamburg-Bergedorf	L. Kohoutek	PHO	2.2 km	MPC · JPL
58095 Oranienstein	1973 SN	Oranienstein	September 19, 1973	Palomar	C. J. van Houten, I. van Houten-Groeneveld, T. Gehrels	3:2	12 km	MPC · JPL
58096 Oineus	1973 SC_{2}	Oineus	September 29, 1973	Palomar	C. J. van Houten, I. van Houten-Groeneveld, T. Gehrels	L4	13 km	MPC · JPL
58097 Alimov	1976 UQ_{1}	Alimov	October 26, 1976	Nauchnij	T. M. Smirnova	·	3.9 km	MPC · JPL
58098 Quirrenbach	1977 TC	Quirrenbach	October 9, 1977	La Silla	L. D. Schmadel	H	2.0 km	MPC · JPL
58099	1978 RB_{10}	—	September 2, 1978	La Silla	C.-I. Lagerkvist	(254)	1.5 km	MPC · JPL
58100	1978 VQ_{7}	—	November 7, 1978	Palomar	E. F. Helin, S. J. Bus	·	5.2 km	MPC · JPL

== 58101–58200 ==
back to top

Designation			Discovery			Properties		Ref
Permanent	Provisional	Named after	Date	Site	Discoverer(s)	Category	Diam.	Ref
58101	1979 MV_{4}	—	June 25, 1979	Siding Spring	E. F. Helin, S. J. Bus	·	2.8 km	MPC · JPL
58102	1979 MW_{4}	—	June 25, 1979	Siding Spring	E. F. Helin, S. J. Bus	·	4.6 km	MPC · JPL
58103	1979 MQ_{5}	—	June 25, 1979	Siding Spring	E. F. Helin, S. J. Bus	·	4.9 km	MPC · JPL
58104	1979 ML_{7}	—	June 25, 1979	Siding Spring	E. F. Helin, S. J. Bus	·	2.4 km	MPC · JPL
58105	1979 MN_{8}	—	June 25, 1979	Siding Spring	E. F. Helin, S. J. Bus	·	5.4 km	MPC · JPL
58106	1979 MO_{8}	—	June 25, 1979	Siding Spring	E. F. Helin, S. J. Bus	EOS	4.4 km	MPC · JPL
58107	1979 OZ_{10}	—	July 24, 1979	Siding Spring	S. J. Bus	H	1.4 km	MPC · JPL
58108	1979 QE_{1}	—	August 22, 1979	La Silla	C.-I. Lagerkvist	·	3.0 km	MPC · JPL
58109	1980 PQ	—	August 6, 1980	Kleť	Z. Vávrová	·	8.2 km	MPC · JPL
58110	1980 UF_{1}	—	October 31, 1980	Palomar	S. J. Bus	·	2.1 km	MPC · JPL
58111	1981 ER_{2}	—	March 2, 1981	Siding Spring	S. J. Bus	·	5.4 km	MPC · JPL
58112	1981 EC_{3}	—	March 2, 1981	Siding Spring	S. J. Bus	·	1.6 km	MPC · JPL
58113	1981 EV_{4}	—	March 2, 1981	Siding Spring	S. J. Bus	·	1.1 km	MPC · JPL
58114	1981 EL_{6}	—	March 6, 1981	Siding Spring	S. J. Bus	·	4.8 km	MPC · JPL
58115	1981 EB_{7}	—	March 6, 1981	Siding Spring	S. J. Bus	EOS	4.3 km	MPC · JPL
58116	1981 EH_{7}	—	March 7, 1981	Siding Spring	S. J. Bus	·	3.5 km	MPC · JPL
58117	1981 ER_{7}	—	March 1, 1981	Siding Spring	S. J. Bus	·	1.6 km	MPC · JPL
58118	1981 EX_{7}	—	March 1, 1981	Siding Spring	S. J. Bus	·	2.9 km	MPC · JPL
58119	1981 EJ_{9}	—	March 1, 1981	Siding Spring	S. J. Bus	·	2.4 km	MPC · JPL
58120	1981 EU_{11}	—	March 7, 1981	Siding Spring	S. J. Bus	ADE	5.3 km	MPC · JPL
58121	1981 EA_{13}	—	March 1, 1981	Siding Spring	S. J. Bus	V	1.5 km	MPC · JPL
58122	1981 EW_{19}	—	March 2, 1981	Siding Spring	S. J. Bus	·	1.9 km	MPC · JPL
58123	1981 EE_{22}	—	March 2, 1981	Siding Spring	S. J. Bus	HYG	6.3 km	MPC · JPL
58124	1981 EK_{29}	—	March 1, 1981	Siding Spring	S. J. Bus	·	4.7 km	MPC · JPL
58125	1981 EO_{31}	—	March 2, 1981	Siding Spring	S. J. Bus	·	2.9 km	MPC · JPL
58126	1981 EJ_{32}	—	March 6, 1981	Siding Spring	S. J. Bus	·	2.9 km	MPC · JPL
58127	1981 EG_{37}	—	March 1, 1981	Siding Spring	S. J. Bus	·	1.2 km	MPC · JPL
58128	1981 EJ_{37}	—	March 1, 1981	Siding Spring	S. J. Bus	·	2.7 km	MPC · JPL
58129	1981 EU_{37}	—	March 1, 1981	Siding Spring	S. J. Bus	·	5.0 km	MPC · JPL
58130	1981 ER_{38}	—	March 1, 1981	Siding Spring	S. J. Bus	·	4.7 km	MPC · JPL
58131	1981 EQ_{39}	—	March 2, 1981	Siding Spring	S. J. Bus	·	3.2 km	MPC · JPL
58132	1981 EW_{39}	—	March 2, 1981	Siding Spring	S. J. Bus	·	5.8 km	MPC · JPL
58133	1981 EN_{40}	—	March 2, 1981	Siding Spring	S. J. Bus	NYS ·	3.9 km	MPC · JPL
58134	1981 EW_{40}	—	March 2, 1981	Siding Spring	S. J. Bus	·	3.2 km	MPC · JPL
58135	1981 EK_{42}	—	March 2, 1981	Siding Spring	S. J. Bus	HYG	5.3 km	MPC · JPL
58136	1981 EV_{42}	—	March 2, 1981	Siding Spring	S. J. Bus	·	2.1 km	MPC · JPL
58137	1981 EJ_{44}	—	March 7, 1981	Siding Spring	S. J. Bus	EOS	5.3 km	MPC · JPL
58138	1981 ET_{45}	—	March 1, 1981	Siding Spring	S. J. Bus	THB	5.0 km	MPC · JPL
58139	1981 EP_{46}	—	March 2, 1981	Siding Spring	S. J. Bus	·	4.6 km	MPC · JPL
58140	1981 SN	—	September 22, 1981	Kleť	A. Mrkos	·	4.3 km	MPC · JPL
58141	1981 UW_{22}	—	October 24, 1981	Palomar	S. J. Bus	·	2.0 km	MPC · JPL
58142	1983 RW_{3}	—	September 4, 1983	La Silla	H. Debehogne	PHO	5.0 km	MPC · JPL
58143	1983 VD_{7}	—	November 1, 1983	Cavriana	Cavriana	·	6.6 km	MPC · JPL
58144	1983 WU	—	November 29, 1983	Anderson Mesa	E. Bowell	·	4.2 km	MPC · JPL
58145 Gus	1986 PT_{1}	Gus	August 1, 1986	Palomar	Rudnyk, M.	·	4.1 km	MPC · JPL
58146	1986 RU	—	September 6, 1986	Palomar	E. F. Helin	·	5.1 km	MPC · JPL
58147	1986 WK	—	November 29, 1986	Ojima	T. Niijima, T. Urata	·	4.6 km	MPC · JPL
58148	1987 SH_{4}	—	September 29, 1987	Anderson Mesa	E. Bowell	EUN	5.4 km	MPC · JPL
58149	1987 SX_{11}	—	September 26, 1987	La Silla	H. Debehogne	·	4.2 km	MPC · JPL
58150	1988 CY_{4}	—	February 13, 1988	La Silla	E. W. Elst	·	3.1 km	MPC · JPL
58151	1988 CG_{7}	—	February 15, 1988	La Silla	E. W. Elst	GEF	3.5 km	MPC · JPL
58152 Natsöderblom	1988 PF_{2}	Natsöderblom	August 12, 1988	Tautenburg Observatory	F. Börngen	·	2.6 km	MPC · JPL
58153	1988 RH_{11}	—	September 14, 1988	Cerro Tololo	S. J. Bus	L5	20 km	MPC · JPL
58154	1988 RJ_{11}	—	September 14, 1988	Cerro Tololo	S. J. Bus	·	1.4 km	MPC · JPL
58155	1988 VD	—	November 3, 1988	Brorfelde	P. Jensen	H	1.8 km	MPC · JPL
58156	1989 GL	—	April 6, 1989	Palomar	E. F. Helin	PHO	3.9 km	MPC · JPL
58157	1989 GC_{3}	—	April 3, 1989	La Silla	E. W. Elst	·	2.1 km	MPC · JPL
58158	1989 RA	—	September 1, 1989	Lake Tekapo	A. C. Gilmore, P. M. Kilmartin	·	2.2 km	MPC · JPL
58159	1989 SL_{4}	—	September 26, 1989	La Silla	E. W. Elst	NYS	3.9 km	MPC · JPL
58160	1989 SX_{4}	—	September 26, 1989	La Silla	E. W. Elst	EUN	3.8 km	MPC · JPL
58161	1989 SH_{5}	—	September 26, 1989	La Silla	E. W. Elst	NYS	3.5 km	MPC · JPL
58162	1989 TS_{6}	—	October 7, 1989	La Silla	E. W. Elst	EUN	2.5 km	MPC · JPL
58163 Minnesang	1989 UJ_{7}	Minnesang	October 23, 1989	Tautenburg Observatory	F. Börngen	·	3.1 km	MPC · JPL
58164 Reiwanohoshi	1989 WV_{3}	Reiwanohoshi	November 20, 1989	Geisei	T. Seki	·	4.8 km	MPC · JPL
58165	1990 HQ_{5}	—	April 29, 1990	Siding Spring	A. Żytkow, M. J. Irwin	(883)	3.3 km	MPC · JPL
58166	1990 OF_{3}	—	July 29, 1990	Palomar	H. E. Holt	·	9.0 km	MPC · JPL
58167	1990 QM_{3}	—	August 28, 1990	Palomar	H. E. Holt	·	2.9 km	MPC · JPL
58168	1990 QB_{9}	—	August 16, 1990	La Silla	E. W. Elst	·	2.5 km	MPC · JPL
58169	1990 SD_{3}	—	September 18, 1990	Palomar	H. E. Holt	·	2.5 km	MPC · JPL
58170	1990 SB_{5}	—	September 22, 1990	La Silla	E. W. Elst	·	2.9 km	MPC · JPL
58171	1990 SC_{5}	—	September 22, 1990	La Silla	E. W. Elst	MAS	1.6 km	MPC · JPL
58172	1990 SD_{8}	—	September 22, 1990	La Silla	E. W. Elst	·	6.0 km	MPC · JPL
58173	1990 SS_{10}	—	September 16, 1990	Palomar	H. E. Holt	·	2.8 km	MPC · JPL
58174	1990 SZ_{10}	—	September 20, 1990	Palomar	H. E. Holt	·	3.0 km	MPC · JPL
58175	1990 SE_{15}	—	September 17, 1990	Palomar	H. E. Holt	·	1.9 km	MPC · JPL
58176	1990 SN_{16}	—	September 17, 1990	Palomar	H. E. Holt	·	2.9 km	MPC · JPL
58177	1990 TB_{6}	—	October 9, 1990	Siding Spring	R. H. McNaught	·	2.6 km	MPC · JPL
58178	1990 UY_{1}	—	October 20, 1990	Siding Spring	R. H. McNaught	·	3.8 km	MPC · JPL
58179	1990 UN_{3}	—	October 16, 1990	La Silla	E. W. Elst	ERI	4.0 km	MPC · JPL
58180	1990 WG_{6}	—	November 21, 1990	La Silla	E. W. Elst	·	2.6 km	MPC · JPL
58181	1991 CG_{1}	—	February 7, 1991	Kitami	K. Endate, K. Watanabe	(5)	4.6 km	MPC · JPL
58182	1991 PX_{2}	—	August 2, 1991	La Silla	E. W. Elst	·	4.1 km	MPC · JPL
58183	1991 PH_{9}	—	August 15, 1991	Palomar	E. F. Helin	JUN	2.8 km	MPC · JPL
58184 Masayukiyamamoto	1991 RG_{1}	Masayukiyamamoto	September 7, 1991	Geisei	T. Seki	MAS	2.1 km	MPC · JPL
58185 Rokkosan	1991 RH_{1}	Rokkosan	September 7, 1991	Geisei	T. Seki	·	2.2 km	MPC · JPL
58186 Langkavel	1991 RT_{4}	Langkavel	September 13, 1991	Tautenburg Observatory	L. D. Schmadel, F. Börngen	·	1.6 km	MPC · JPL
58187	1991 TD	—	October 1, 1991	Siding Spring	R. H. McNaught	EUN	3.1 km	MPC · JPL
58188	1991 TA_{9}	—	October 1, 1991	Kitt Peak	Spacewatch	3:2	9.1 km	MPC · JPL
58189	1991 VV_{9}	—	November 4, 1991	Kitt Peak	Spacewatch	MAS	1.4 km	MPC · JPL
58190	1991 VH_{12}	—	November 8, 1991	Kitt Peak	Spacewatch	·	1.6 km	MPC · JPL
58191 Dolomiten	1991 YN_{1}	Dolomiten	December 28, 1991	Tautenburg Observatory	F. Börngen	V	2.5 km	MPC · JPL
58192	1992 AQ	—	January 10, 1992	Palomar	E. F. Helin	PHO	2.1 km	MPC · JPL
58193	1992 DL_{6}	—	February 29, 1992	La Silla	UESAC	·	6.5 km	MPC · JPL
58194	1992 DR_{6}	—	February 29, 1992	La Silla	UESAC	·	2.7 km	MPC · JPL
58195	1992 DH_{7}	—	February 29, 1992	La Silla	UESAC	·	3.6 km	MPC · JPL
58196 Ashleyess	1992 EC_{1}	Ashleyess	March 10, 1992	Siding Spring	D. I. Steel	·	5.0 km	MPC · JPL
58197	1992 EH_{2}	—	March 6, 1992	Kitt Peak	Spacewatch	·	2.1 km	MPC · JPL
58198	1992 EU_{2}	—	March 7, 1992	Kitt Peak	Spacewatch	·	1.4 km	MPC · JPL
58199	1992 EC_{5}	—	March 1, 1992	La Silla	UESAC	·	2.0 km	MPC · JPL
58200	1992 EV_{6}	—	March 1, 1992	La Silla	UESAC	·	2.1 km	MPC · JPL

== 58201–58300 ==
back to top

Designation			Discovery			Properties		Ref
Permanent	Provisional	Named after	Date	Site	Discoverer(s)	Category	Diam.	Ref
58201	1992 ED_{7}	—	March 1, 1992	La Silla	UESAC	EMA	7.8 km	MPC · JPL
58202	1992 EO_{7}	—	March 1, 1992	La Silla	UESAC	fast	1.9 km	MPC · JPL
58203	1992 EC_{9}	—	March 2, 1992	La Silla	UESAC	V	2.0 km	MPC · JPL
58204	1992 EK_{10}	—	March 2, 1992	La Silla	UESAC	·	5.2 km	MPC · JPL
58205	1992 EX_{12}	—	March 1, 1992	La Silla	UESAC	MAS	1.6 km	MPC · JPL
58206	1992 ER_{13}	—	March 2, 1992	La Silla	UESAC	·	5.1 km	MPC · JPL
58207	1992 EF_{14}	—	March 2, 1992	La Silla	UESAC	·	2.1 km	MPC · JPL
58208	1992 EX_{16}	—	March 1, 1992	La Silla	UESAC	·	2.7 km	MPC · JPL
58209	1992 EH_{19}	—	March 1, 1992	La Silla	UESAC	·	5.1 km	MPC · JPL
58210	1992 EW_{21}	—	March 1, 1992	La Silla	UESAC	·	6.7 km	MPC · JPL
58211	1992 HF_{4}	—	April 23, 1992	La Silla	E. W. Elst	·	5.8 km	MPC · JPL
58212	1992 OQ_{5}	—	July 30, 1992	La Silla	E. W. Elst	·	4.6 km	MPC · JPL
58213	1992 QP	—	August 29, 1992	Palomar	E. F. Helin	·	4.0 km	MPC · JPL
58214 Amorim	1992 RA_{2}	Amorim	September 2, 1992	La Silla	E. W. Elst	BRA	5.0 km	MPC · JPL
58215 von Klitzing	1992 SY_{1}	von Klitzing	September 21, 1992	Tautenburg Observatory	F. Börngen, L. D. Schmadel	·	4.7 km	MPC · JPL
58216	1992 SR_{9}	—	September 27, 1992	Kitt Peak	Spacewatch	·	2.3 km	MPC · JPL
58217 Peterhebel	1992 SP_{16}	Peterhebel	September 24, 1992	Tautenburg Observatory	L. D. Schmadel, F. Börngen	·	2.3 km	MPC · JPL
58218	1992 UZ_{7}	—	October 23, 1992	Caussols	E. W. Elst	·	5.2 km	MPC · JPL
58219	1992 WZ_{2}	—	November 18, 1992	Kushiro	S. Ueda, H. Kaneda	MAR	5.1 km	MPC · JPL
58220	1993 BY_{4}	—	January 27, 1993	Caussols	E. W. Elst	·	2.6 km	MPC · JPL
58221 Boston	1993 BM_{14}	Boston	January 23, 1993	La Silla	E. W. Elst	GEF	3.7 km	MPC · JPL
58222	1993 FA_{18}	—	March 17, 1993	La Silla	UESAC	·	2.2 km	MPC · JPL
58223	1993 FO_{18}	—	March 17, 1993	La Silla	UESAC	·	7.8 km	MPC · JPL
58224	1993 FM_{20}	—	March 19, 1993	La Silla	UESAC	VER	7.0 km	MPC · JPL
58225	1993 FY_{20}	—	March 21, 1993	La Silla	UESAC	·	3.9 km	MPC · JPL
58226	1993 FW_{22}	—	March 21, 1993	La Silla	UESAC	HYG	7.9 km	MPC · JPL
58227	1993 FB_{26}	—	March 21, 1993	La Silla	UESAC	·	1.7 km	MPC · JPL
58228	1993 FL_{26}	—	March 21, 1993	La Silla	UESAC	·	1.6 km	MPC · JPL
58229	1993 FZ_{27}	—	March 21, 1993	La Silla	UESAC	·	3.5 km	MPC · JPL
58230	1993 FR_{39}	—	March 19, 1993	La Silla	UESAC	·	1.6 km	MPC · JPL
58231	1993 FQ_{40}	—	March 19, 1993	La Silla	UESAC	THM	7.6 km	MPC · JPL
58232	1993 FD_{41}	—	March 19, 1993	La Silla	UESAC	·	1.7 km	MPC · JPL
58233	1993 FN_{50}	—	March 19, 1993	La Silla	UESAC	·	1.3 km	MPC · JPL
58234	1993 FY_{50}	—	March 19, 1993	La Silla	UESAC	·	3.9 km	MPC · JPL
58235	1993 FW_{52}	—	March 17, 1993	La Silla	UESAC	·	1.6 km	MPC · JPL
58236	1993 FK_{56}	—	March 17, 1993	La Silla	UESAC	·	6.6 km	MPC · JPL
58237	1993 FR_{66}	—	March 21, 1993	La Silla	UESAC	·	5.1 km	MPC · JPL
58238	1993 FH_{77}	—	March 21, 1993	La Silla	UESAC	·	8.6 km	MPC · JPL
58239	1993 FS_{77}	—	March 21, 1993	La Silla	UESAC	·	7.9 km	MPC · JPL
58240	1993 FV_{81}	—	March 18, 1993	La Silla	UESAC	·	4.9 km	MPC · JPL
58241	1993 HH_{4}	—	April 21, 1993	Kitt Peak	Spacewatch	·	4.8 km	MPC · JPL
58242	1993 HJ_{4}	—	April 21, 1993	Kitt Peak	Spacewatch	·	9.2 km	MPC · JPL
58243	1993 NG_{1}	—	July 12, 1993	La Silla	E. W. Elst	·	3.3 km	MPC · JPL
58244	1993 OX_{5}	—	July 20, 1993	La Silla	E. W. Elst	·	2.4 km	MPC · JPL
58245	1993 OS_{7}	—	July 20, 1993	La Silla	E. W. Elst	·	2.5 km	MPC · JPL
58246	1993 OP_{12}	—	July 19, 1993	La Silla	E. W. Elst	·	3.0 km	MPC · JPL
58247	1993 PH_{3}	—	August 14, 1993	Caussols	E. W. Elst	·	1.5 km	MPC · JPL
58248	1993 PO_{5}	—	August 15, 1993	Caussols	E. W. Elst	·	5.4 km	MPC · JPL
58249	1993 PC_{6}	—	August 15, 1993	Caussols	E. W. Elst	PHO	3.1 km	MPC · JPL
58250	1993 QU_{1}	—	August 16, 1993	Caussols	E. W. Elst	·	2.7 km	MPC · JPL
58251	1993 QS_{2}	—	August 16, 1993	Caussols	E. W. Elst	NYS	2.3 km	MPC · JPL
58252	1993 QG_{4}	—	August 18, 1993	Caussols	E. W. Elst	·	2.5 km	MPC · JPL
58253	1993 QJ_{5}	—	August 17, 1993	Caussols	E. W. Elst	·	1.7 km	MPC · JPL
58254	1993 QN_{5}	—	August 17, 1993	Caussols	E. W. Elst	·	1.7 km	MPC · JPL
58255	1993 RS_{5}	—	September 15, 1993	La Silla	E. W. Elst	·	4.8 km	MPC · JPL
58256	1993 RL_{7}	—	September 15, 1993	La Silla	E. W. Elst	·	6.3 km	MPC · JPL
58257	1993 RN_{9}	—	September 14, 1993	La Silla	H. Debehogne, E. W. Elst	NYS	3.9 km	MPC · JPL
58258	1993 RU_{10}	—	September 14, 1993	La Silla	H. Debehogne, E. W. Elst	KOR	3.2 km	MPC · JPL
58259	1993 RA_{13}	—	September 14, 1993	La Silla	H. Debehogne, E. W. Elst	·	2.8 km	MPC · JPL
58260	1993 SO	—	September 18, 1993	Kitt Peak	Spacewatch	·	3.0 km	MPC · JPL
58261	1993 SD_{1}	—	September 16, 1993	Kitami	K. Endate, K. Watanabe	·	6.3 km	MPC · JPL
58262	1993 ST_{2}	—	September 19, 1993	Kitami	K. Endate, K. Watanabe	·	1.7 km	MPC · JPL
58263	1993 SO_{4}	—	September 19, 1993	Caussols	E. W. Elst	·	3.2 km	MPC · JPL
58264	1993 SW_{7}	—	September 17, 1993	La Silla	E. W. Elst	(5)	2.6 km	MPC · JPL
58265	1993 TJ_{12}	—	October 14, 1993	Palomar	H. E. Holt	·	2.2 km	MPC · JPL
58266	1993 TN_{15}	—	October 9, 1993	La Silla	E. W. Elst	MAS · fast	1.8 km	MPC · JPL
58267	1993 TB_{16}	—	October 9, 1993	La Silla	E. W. Elst	·	8.4 km	MPC · JPL
58268	1993 TQ_{19}	—	October 9, 1993	La Silla	E. W. Elst	·	2.6 km	MPC · JPL
58269	1993 TG_{20}	—	October 9, 1993	La Silla	E. W. Elst	NYS	3.5 km	MPC · JPL
58270	1993 TK_{22}	—	October 9, 1993	La Silla	E. W. Elst	NYS	3.1 km	MPC · JPL
58271	1993 TT_{22}	—	October 9, 1993	La Silla	E. W. Elst	V	2.3 km	MPC · JPL
58272	1993 TZ_{27}	—	October 9, 1993	La Silla	E. W. Elst	·	2.3 km	MPC · JPL
58273	1993 TA_{31}	—	October 9, 1993	La Silla	E. W. Elst	(5)	3.2 km	MPC · JPL
58274	1993 TY_{31}	—	October 9, 1993	La Silla	E. W. Elst	ADE	7.7 km	MPC · JPL
58275	1993 TR_{32}	—	October 9, 1993	La Silla	E. W. Elst	·	1.7 km	MPC · JPL
58276	1993 TB_{33}	—	October 9, 1993	La Silla	E. W. Elst	NYS ·	3.0 km	MPC · JPL
58277	1993 TW_{33}	—	October 9, 1993	La Silla	E. W. Elst	·	5.0 km	MPC · JPL
58278	1993 TA_{34}	—	October 9, 1993	La Silla	E. W. Elst	·	2.7 km	MPC · JPL
58279 Kamerlingh	1993 TE_{40}	Kamerlingh	October 11, 1993	La Silla	E. W. Elst	3:2	10 km	MPC · JPL
58280	1993 UC_{2}	—	October 20, 1993	Kitt Peak	Spacewatch	·	2.9 km	MPC · JPL
58281	1993 UR_{5}	—	October 20, 1993	La Silla	E. W. Elst	·	2.3 km	MPC · JPL
58282	1993 UB_{6}	—	October 20, 1993	La Silla	E. W. Elst	·	2.3 km	MPC · JPL
58283	1993 UO_{7}	—	October 20, 1993	La Silla	E. W. Elst	V	1.2 km	MPC · JPL
58284	1993 VW_{3}	—	November 14, 1993	Nyukasa	M. Hirasawa, S. Suzuki	·	5.1 km	MPC · JPL
58285	1993 YN	—	December 16, 1993	Farra d'Isonzo	Farra d'Isonzo	·	2.8 km	MPC · JPL
58286	1993 YO_{1}	—	December 16, 1993	Kitt Peak	Spacewatch	·	2.0 km	MPC · JPL
58287	1994 AE_{1}	—	January 7, 1994	Oizumi	T. Kobayashi	(194)	6.0 km	MPC · JPL
58288	1994 CF_{14}	—	February 8, 1994	La Silla	E. W. Elst	·	6.0 km	MPC · JPL
58289	1994 CC_{16}	—	February 8, 1994	La Silla	E. W. Elst	·	3.6 km	MPC · JPL
58290	1994 CH_{17}	—	February 8, 1994	La Silla	E. W. Elst	·	5.2 km	MPC · JPL
58291	1994 GA	—	April 1, 1994	Siding Spring	R. H. McNaught	(23255)	9.1 km	MPC · JPL
58292	1994 GC	—	April 2, 1994	Stroncone	A. Vagnozzi	KOR	4.0 km	MPC · JPL
58293	1994 GQ_{5}	—	April 6, 1994	Kitt Peak	Spacewatch	·	3.1 km	MPC · JPL
58294	1994 JJ_{5}	—	May 4, 1994	Kitt Peak	Spacewatch	·	5.6 km	MPC · JPL
58295	1994 JJ_{9}	—	May 15, 1994	Palomar	C. P. de Saint-Aignan	·	4.6 km	MPC · JPL
58296	1994 LF_{1}	—	June 2, 1994	Siding Spring	R. H. McNaught	·	7.3 km	MPC · JPL
58297	1994 PA_{3}	—	August 10, 1994	La Silla	E. W. Elst	·	6.2 km	MPC · JPL
58298	1994 PB_{3}	—	August 10, 1994	La Silla	E. W. Elst	V	1.9 km	MPC · JPL
58299	1994 PH_{3}	—	August 10, 1994	La Silla	E. W. Elst	EOS	6.0 km	MPC · JPL
58300	1994 PQ_{5}	—	August 10, 1994	La Silla	E. W. Elst	·	5.7 km	MPC · JPL

== 58301–58400 ==
back to top

Designation			Discovery			Properties		Ref
Permanent	Provisional	Named after	Date	Site	Discoverer(s)	Category	Diam.	Ref
58301	1994 PB_{8}	—	August 10, 1994	La Silla	E. W. Elst	·	2.0 km	MPC · JPL
58302	1994 PX_{8}	—	August 10, 1994	La Silla	E. W. Elst	THM	6.9 km	MPC · JPL
58303	1994 PY_{9}	—	August 10, 1994	La Silla	E. W. Elst	·	1.6 km	MPC · JPL
58304	1994 PP_{10}	—	August 10, 1994	La Silla	E. W. Elst	·	1.7 km	MPC · JPL
58305	1994 PM_{11}	—	August 10, 1994	La Silla	E. W. Elst	·	4.8 km	MPC · JPL
58306	1994 PA_{12}	—	August 10, 1994	La Silla	E. W. Elst	·	1.4 km	MPC · JPL
58307	1994 PM_{13}	—	August 10, 1994	La Silla	E. W. Elst	·	6.7 km	MPC · JPL
58308	1994 PE_{16}	—	August 10, 1994	La Silla	E. W. Elst	·	2.7 km	MPC · JPL
58309	1994 PV_{17}	—	August 10, 1994	La Silla	E. W. Elst	·	1.7 km	MPC · JPL
58310	1994 PT_{20}	—	August 12, 1994	La Silla	E. W. Elst	·	2.3 km	MPC · JPL
58311	1994 PA_{22}	—	August 12, 1994	La Silla	E. W. Elst	·	3.5 km	MPC · JPL
58312	1994 PO_{23}	—	August 12, 1994	La Silla	E. W. Elst	·	2.6 km	MPC · JPL
58313	1994 PX_{27}	—	August 12, 1994	La Silla	E. W. Elst	·	5.6 km	MPC · JPL
58314	1994 PE_{29}	—	August 12, 1994	La Silla	E. W. Elst	·	1.6 km	MPC · JPL
58315	1994 PV_{29}	—	August 12, 1994	La Silla	E. W. Elst	·	1.7 km	MPC · JPL
58316	1994 PR_{30}	—	August 12, 1994	La Silla	E. W. Elst	·	2.0 km	MPC · JPL
58317	1994 PB_{33}	—	August 12, 1994	La Silla	E. W. Elst	·	1.3 km	MPC · JPL
58318	1994 PW_{37}	—	August 10, 1994	La Silla	E. W. Elst	·	3.9 km	MPC · JPL
58319	1994 PZ_{37}	—	August 10, 1994	La Silla	E. W. Elst	·	6.8 km	MPC · JPL
58320	1994 PE_{38}	—	August 10, 1994	La Silla	E. W. Elst	·	6.0 km	MPC · JPL
58321	1994 PQ_{38}	—	August 10, 1994	La Silla	E. W. Elst	THM	5.9 km	MPC · JPL
58322	1994 PU_{38}	—	August 10, 1994	La Silla	E. W. Elst	·	3.4 km	MPC · JPL
58323	1994 PK_{39}	—	August 10, 1994	La Silla	E. W. Elst	·	6.3 km	MPC · JPL
58324	1994 RZ_{9}	—	September 12, 1994	Kitt Peak	Spacewatch	ERI	3.1 km	MPC · JPL
58325	1994 RE_{11}	—	September 11, 1994	Siding Spring	R. H. McNaught	·	2.2 km	MPC · JPL
58326	1994 RQ_{16}	—	September 3, 1994	La Silla	E. W. Elst	KOR	3.4 km	MPC · JPL
58327	1994 SC_{9}	—	September 28, 1994	Kitt Peak	Spacewatch	HYG	6.9 km	MPC · JPL
58328	1994 ST_{9}	—	September 28, 1994	Kitt Peak	Spacewatch	·	1.7 km	MPC · JPL
58329	1994 SD_{11}	—	September 29, 1994	Kitt Peak	Spacewatch	THM	5.3 km	MPC · JPL
58330	1994 TK	—	October 3, 1994	Siding Spring	R. H. McNaught	BAR	4.0 km	MPC · JPL
58331	1994 TQ_{10}	—	October 9, 1994	Kitt Peak	Spacewatch	KON	3.6 km	MPC · JPL
58332	1994 UR	—	October 31, 1994	Oizumi	T. Kobayashi	NYS	3.3 km	MPC · JPL
58333	1994 UL_{1}	—	October 25, 1994	Kushiro	S. Ueda, H. Kaneda	·	1.8 km	MPC · JPL
58334	1994 UJ_{6}	—	October 28, 1994	Kitt Peak	Spacewatch	·	1.4 km	MPC · JPL
58335	1994 UN_{11}	—	October 31, 1994	Kitt Peak	Spacewatch	·	3.2 km	MPC · JPL
58336	1994 VP	—	November 1, 1994	Oizumi	T. Kobayashi	·	2.4 km	MPC · JPL
58337	1994 WV	—	November 25, 1994	Oizumi	T. Kobayashi	·	2.4 km	MPC · JPL
58338	1994 WX_{4}	—	November 27, 1994	Kitt Peak	Spacewatch	·	4.7 km	MPC · JPL
58339	1994 WB_{12}	—	November 27, 1994	Caussols	E. W. Elst	·	2.1 km	MPC · JPL
58340	1994 YO_{1}	—	December 31, 1994	Oizumi	T. Kobayashi	·	2.8 km	MPC · JPL
58341	1994 YP_{1}	—	December 31, 1994	Oizumi	T. Kobayashi	·	2.1 km	MPC · JPL
58342	1994 YR_{1}	—	December 31, 1994	Oizumi	T. Kobayashi	·	2.6 km	MPC · JPL
58343	1995 BG_{5}	—	January 23, 1995	Kitt Peak	Spacewatch	·	2.6 km	MPC · JPL
58344	1995 BZ_{12}	—	January 31, 1995	Kitt Peak	Spacewatch	·	3.6 km	MPC · JPL
58345 Moomintroll	1995 CZ_{1}	Moomintroll	February 7, 1995	Siding Spring	D. J. Asher	H	1.1 km	MPC · JPL
58346	1995 CV_{4}	—	February 1, 1995	Kitt Peak	Spacewatch	·	2.1 km	MPC · JPL
58347	1995 CB_{8}	—	February 2, 1995	Kitt Peak	Spacewatch	·	2.3 km	MPC · JPL
58348	1995 CE_{8}	—	February 2, 1995	Kitt Peak	Spacewatch	NYS	3.2 km	MPC · JPL
58349	1995 DO_{5}	—	February 22, 1995	Kitt Peak	Spacewatch	·	3.9 km	MPC · JPL
58350	1995 DN_{6}	—	February 24, 1995	Kitt Peak	Spacewatch	·	1.8 km	MPC · JPL
58351	1995 DA_{8}	—	February 24, 1995	Kitt Peak	Spacewatch	·	1.7 km	MPC · JPL
58352	1995 EX_{1}	—	March 1, 1995	Kitt Peak	Spacewatch	NYS	2.2 km	MPC · JPL
58353	1995 EW_{4}	—	March 2, 1995	Kitt Peak	Spacewatch	3:2	7.4 km	MPC · JPL
58354	1995 EH_{5}	—	March 2, 1995	Kitt Peak	Spacewatch	·	2.2 km	MPC · JPL
58355	1995 FN	—	March 26, 1995	Nachi-Katsuura	Y. Shimizu, T. Urata	·	4.9 km	MPC · JPL
58356	1995 FR_{1}	—	March 23, 1995	Kitt Peak	Spacewatch	EUN	4.0 km	MPC · JPL
58357	1995 HT_{1}	—	April 24, 1995	Kitt Peak	Spacewatch	EUN	6.8 km	MPC · JPL
58358	1995 HS_{3}	—	April 26, 1995	Kitt Peak	Spacewatch	·	2.2 km	MPC · JPL
58359	1995 KP_{4}	—	May 26, 1995	Kitt Peak	Spacewatch	·	2.3 km	MPC · JPL
58360	1995 LM	—	June 3, 1995	Kitt Peak	Spacewatch	EOS	5.3 km	MPC · JPL
58361	1995 MC_{3}	—	June 25, 1995	Kitt Peak	Spacewatch	EUN	2.7 km	MPC · JPL
58362	1995 MJ_{4}	—	June 29, 1995	Kitt Peak	Spacewatch	·	3.8 km	MPC · JPL
58363	1995 MP_{4}	—	June 29, 1995	Kitt Peak	Spacewatch	·	7.6 km	MPC · JPL
58364 Feierberg	1995 MF_{7}	Feierberg	June 25, 1995	Kitt Peak	Spacewatch	RAF	1.8 km	MPC · JPL
58365 Robmedrano	1995 OQ	Robmedrano	July 27, 1995	Haleakala	AMOS	·	3.3 km	MPC · JPL
58366	1995 OD_{8}	—	July 25, 1995	Kitt Peak	Spacewatch	L4	11 km	MPC · JPL
58367	1995 QL	—	August 19, 1995	Church Stretton	S. P. Laurie	(5)	3.2 km	MPC · JPL
58368	1995 QK_{1}	—	August 19, 1995	Xinglong	SCAP	·	4.9 km	MPC · JPL
58369	1995 QZ_{2}	—	August 30, 1995	Pleiade	Pleiade	·	7.2 km	MPC · JPL
58370	1995 QM_{5}	—	August 22, 1995	Kitt Peak	Spacewatch	·	7.7 km	MPC · JPL
58371	1995 QD_{7}	—	August 25, 1995	Kitt Peak	Spacewatch	MAR	2.5 km	MPC · JPL
58372	1995 SQ	—	September 18, 1995	Ondřejov	L. Kotková	MAS	1.5 km	MPC · JPL
58373 Albertoalonso	1995 SR	Albertoalonso	September 19, 1995	Catalina Station	T. B. Spahr	·	8.2 km	MPC · JPL
58374	1995 SF_{5}	—	September 20, 1995	Kitami	K. Endate, K. Watanabe	·	3.8 km	MPC · JPL
58375	1995 SD_{22}	—	September 19, 1995	Kitt Peak	Spacewatch	VER	6.9 km	MPC · JPL
58376	1995 SF_{25}	—	September 19, 1995	Kitt Peak	Spacewatch	·	3.1 km	MPC · JPL
58377	1995 SC_{26}	—	September 19, 1995	Kitt Peak	Spacewatch	·	2.0 km	MPC · JPL
58378	1995 SO_{27}	—	September 19, 1995	Kitt Peak	Spacewatch	·	4.7 km	MPC · JPL
58379	1995 SY_{27}	—	September 19, 1995	Kitt Peak	Spacewatch	V	1.3 km	MPC · JPL
58380	1995 SG_{32}	—	September 21, 1995	Kitt Peak	Spacewatch	·	3.5 km	MPC · JPL
58381	1995 SJ_{37}	—	September 24, 1995	Kitt Peak	Spacewatch	EOS	3.6 km	MPC · JPL
58382	1995 SB_{42}	—	September 25, 1995	Kitt Peak	Spacewatch	·	4.3 km	MPC · JPL
58383	1995 SV_{47}	—	September 26, 1995	Kitt Peak	Spacewatch	·	4.0 km	MPC · JPL
58384	1995 SR_{51}	—	September 26, 1995	Kitt Peak	Spacewatch	THM	5.7 km	MPC · JPL
58385	1995 SC_{53}	—	September 28, 1995	Xinglong	SCAP	BRA	2.4 km	MPC · JPL
58386	1995 SM_{53}	—	September 28, 1995	Xinglong	SCAP	·	1.5 km	MPC · JPL
58387	1995 SZ_{78}	—	September 20, 1995	Kitt Peak	Spacewatch	KOR	2.1 km	MPC · JPL
58388	1995 TK	—	October 2, 1995	Kitt Peak	Spacewatch	·	4.2 km	MPC · JPL
58389	1995 TG_{2}	—	October 14, 1995	Xinglong	SCAP	AEO	3.8 km	MPC · JPL
58390	1995 TA_{7}	—	October 15, 1995	Kitt Peak	Spacewatch	·	3.9 km	MPC · JPL
58391	1995 UV_{3}	—	October 20, 1995	Oizumi	T. Kobayashi	·	6.8 km	MPC · JPL
58392	1995 UT_{10}	—	October 17, 1995	Kitt Peak	Spacewatch	·	3.5 km	MPC · JPL
58393	1995 UU_{12}	—	October 17, 1995	Kitt Peak	Spacewatch	THM	3.1 km	MPC · JPL
58394	1995 UX_{20}	—	October 19, 1995	Kitt Peak	Spacewatch	·	3.1 km	MPC · JPL
58395	1995 UW_{24}	—	October 19, 1995	Kitt Peak	Spacewatch	·	2.7 km	MPC · JPL
58396	1995 US_{43}	—	October 25, 1995	Kitt Peak	Spacewatch	·	5.2 km	MPC · JPL
58397	1995 VA_{4}	—	November 14, 1995	Kitt Peak	Spacewatch	·	4.7 km	MPC · JPL
58398	1995 VY_{4}	—	November 14, 1995	Kitt Peak	Spacewatch	·	2.1 km	MPC · JPL
58399	1995 VA_{5}	—	November 14, 1995	Kitt Peak	Spacewatch	·	3.2 km	MPC · JPL
58400	1995 VR_{12}	—	November 15, 1995	Kitt Peak	Spacewatch	KOR	2.3 km	MPC · JPL

== 58401–58500 ==
back to top

Designation			Discovery			Properties		Ref
Permanent	Provisional	Named after	Date	Site	Discoverer(s)	Category	Diam.	Ref
58401	1995 VV_{13}	—	November 15, 1995	Kitt Peak	Spacewatch	·	3.2 km	MPC · JPL
58402	1995 VH_{16}	—	November 15, 1995	Kitt Peak	Spacewatch	·	2.0 km	MPC · JPL
58403	1995 WL_{1}	—	November 16, 1995	Church Stretton	S. P. Laurie	HYG	7.0 km	MPC · JPL
58404	1995 WJ_{7}	—	November 27, 1995	Oizumi	T. Kobayashi	·	6.7 km	MPC · JPL
58405	1995 WN_{9}	—	November 16, 1995	Kitt Peak	Spacewatch	·	2.8 km	MPC · JPL
58406	1995 WN_{18}	—	November 17, 1995	Kitt Peak	Spacewatch	NYS	1.6 km	MPC · JPL
58407	1995 WT_{34}	—	November 20, 1995	Kitt Peak	Spacewatch	·	1.2 km	MPC · JPL
58408	1995 XU	—	December 12, 1995	Oizumi	T. Kobayashi	·	2.6 km	MPC · JPL
58409	1995 XH_{4}	—	December 14, 1995	Kitt Peak	Spacewatch	·	1.1 km	MPC · JPL
58410	1995 YS	—	December 17, 1995	Chichibu	N. Satō, T. Urata	PHO	2.5 km	MPC · JPL
58411	1995 YA_{2}	—	December 21, 1995	Haleakala	NEAT	PHO	2.2 km	MPC · JPL
58412	1995 YX_{2}	—	December 26, 1995	Oizumi	T. Kobayashi	·	8.2 km	MPC · JPL
58413	1995 YC_{8}	—	December 18, 1995	Kitt Peak	Spacewatch	·	1.3 km	MPC · JPL
58414	1995 YS_{12}	—	December 19, 1995	Kitt Peak	Spacewatch	V	1.5 km	MPC · JPL
58415	1996 AM	—	January 11, 1996	Oizumi	T. Kobayashi	·	2.4 km	MPC · JPL
58416	1996 BT_{1}	—	January 23, 1996	Oizumi	T. Kobayashi	·	2.0 km	MPC · JPL
58417 Belzoni	1996 BD_{2}	Belzoni	January 25, 1996	Colleverde	V. S. Casulli	·	1.8 km	MPC · JPL
58418 Luguhu	1996 BA_{4}	Luguhu	January 26, 1996	Xinglong	Xinglong	T_{j} (2.99) · EUP	9.4 km	MPC · JPL
58419	1996 BD_{4}	—	January 26, 1996	Siding Spring	R. H. McNaught	PHO	4.0 km	MPC · JPL
58420	1996 BU_{4}	—	January 16, 1996	Kitt Peak	Spacewatch	·	1.6 km	MPC · JPL
58421	1996 BG_{5}	—	January 18, 1996	Kitt Peak	Spacewatch	·	6.1 km	MPC · JPL
58422	1996 BS_{9}	—	January 21, 1996	Kitt Peak	Spacewatch	·	2.1 km	MPC · JPL
58423	1996 BW_{11}	—	January 24, 1996	Kitt Peak	Spacewatch	·	3.0 km	MPC · JPL
58424 Jamesdunlop	1996 DL_{1}	Jamesdunlop	February 22, 1996	Kleť	M. Tichý, Z. Moravec	·	2.7 km	MPC · JPL
58425	1996 DR_{1}	—	February 20, 1996	Church Stretton	S. P. Laurie	(2076)	1.9 km	MPC · JPL
58426	1996 EA_{2}	—	March 15, 1996	Haleakala	NEAT	·	1.9 km	MPC · JPL
58427	1996 EV_{7}	—	March 11, 1996	Kitt Peak	Spacewatch	AGN	2.7 km	MPC · JPL
58428	1996 EC_{8}	—	March 11, 1996	Kitt Peak	Spacewatch	·	1.4 km	MPC · JPL
58429	1996 FH	—	March 16, 1996	Haleakala	NEAT	·	2.7 km	MPC · JPL
58430	1996 FZ_{1}	—	March 20, 1996	Haleakala	NEAT	·	2.4 km	MPC · JPL
58431	1996 FV_{4}	—	March 21, 1996	Haleakala	NEAT	·	2.8 km	MPC · JPL
58432	1996 FY_{17}	—	March 22, 1996	La Silla	E. W. Elst	V	1.7 km	MPC · JPL
58433	1996 FN_{18}	—	March 22, 1996	La Silla	E. W. Elst	(1338) (FLO)	2.4 km	MPC · JPL
58434	1996 FQ_{18}	—	March 23, 1996	Haleakala	NEAT	·	1.9 km	MPC · JPL
58435	1996 GD_{5}	—	April 11, 1996	Kitt Peak	Spacewatch	·	2.1 km	MPC · JPL
58436	1996 GM_{5}	—	April 11, 1996	Kitt Peak	Spacewatch	·	1.8 km	MPC · JPL
58437	1996 GK_{10}	—	April 13, 1996	Kitt Peak	Spacewatch	·	1.4 km	MPC · JPL
58438	1996 GR_{15}	—	April 13, 1996	Kitt Peak	Spacewatch	·	1.4 km	MPC · JPL
58439	1996 GF_{20}	—	April 15, 1996	La Silla	E. W. Elst	·	1.6 km	MPC · JPL
58440 Zdeněkstuchlík	1996 HV	Zdeněkstuchlík	April 21, 1996	Ondřejov	P. Pravec, L. Kotková	DOR	5.9 km	MPC · JPL
58441 Thomastestoni	1996 HO_{1}	Thomastestoni	April 19, 1996	Bologna	San Vittore	·	3.8 km	MPC · JPL
58442	1996 HR_{9}	—	April 17, 1996	La Silla	E. W. Elst	·	1.4 km	MPC · JPL
58443	1996 HO_{12}	—	April 17, 1996	La Silla	E. W. Elst	·	5.0 km	MPC · JPL
58444	1996 HR_{12}	—	April 17, 1996	La Silla	E. W. Elst	·	1.5 km	MPC · JPL
58445	1996 HU_{16}	—	April 18, 1996	La Silla	E. W. Elst	·	3.7 km	MPC · JPL
58446	1996 HN_{22}	—	April 18, 1996	La Silla	E. W. Elst	·	5.7 km	MPC · JPL
58447	1996 HF_{24}	—	April 20, 1996	La Silla	E. W. Elst	·	4.0 km	MPC · JPL
58448	1996 HO_{25}	—	April 20, 1996	La Silla	E. W. Elst	·	4.6 km	MPC · JPL
58449	1996 HC_{26}	—	April 20, 1996	La Silla	E. W. Elst	NYS	2.0 km	MPC · JPL
58450	1996 JB_{1}	—	May 13, 1996	Haleakala	NEAT	PHO	2.8 km	MPC · JPL
58451	1996 JF_{3}	—	May 9, 1996	Kitt Peak	Spacewatch	V	3.5 km	MPC · JPL
58452	1996 JG_{3}	—	May 9, 1996	Kitt Peak	Spacewatch	·	2.3 km	MPC · JPL
58453	1996 JB_{5}	—	May 10, 1996	Kitt Peak	Spacewatch	·	2.5 km	MPC · JPL
58454	1996 JD_{9}	—	May 12, 1996	Kitt Peak	Spacewatch	V	2.2 km	MPC · JPL
58455	1996 JZ_{11}	—	May 9, 1996	Kitt Peak	Spacewatch	·	1.2 km	MPC · JPL
58456	1996 JT_{14}	—	May 12, 1996	Kitt Peak	Spacewatch	·	2.4 km	MPC · JPL
58457	1996 JX_{14}	—	May 12, 1996	Kitt Peak	Spacewatch	V	1.9 km	MPC · JPL
58458	1996 KP	—	May 21, 1996	Prescott	P. G. Comba	·	4.5 km	MPC · JPL
58459	1996 KK_{8}	—	May 22, 1996	La Silla	E. W. Elst	·	1.5 km	MPC · JPL
58460 Le Mouélic	1996 LM_{1}	Le Mouélic	June 13, 1996	Haleakala	NEAT	PHO	5.2 km	MPC · JPL
58461	1996 ML	—	June 22, 1996	Prescott	P. G. Comba	·	4.1 km	MPC · JPL
58462	1996 NR	—	July 14, 1996	Needville	Needville	·	6.7 km	MPC · JPL
58463	1996 NT_{1}	—	July 14, 1996	Haleakala	NEAT	·	2.9 km	MPC · JPL
58464	1996 NQ_{2}	—	July 14, 1996	La Silla	E. W. Elst	NYS	2.4 km	MPC · JPL
58465	1996 NY_{3}	—	July 14, 1996	La Silla	E. W. Elst	·	2.8 km	MPC · JPL
58466 Santoka	1996 OB_{1}	Santoka	July 23, 1996	Kuma Kogen	A. Nakamura	NYS	1.6 km	MPC · JPL
58467	1996 PW_{2}	—	August 14, 1996	Haleakala	NEAT	·	2.9 km	MPC · JPL
58468	1996 QA	—	August 16, 1996	Haleakala	NEAT	H	1.2 km	MPC · JPL
58469	1996 RC	—	September 7, 1996	Cloudcroft	W. Offutt	·	1.9 km	MPC · JPL
58470	1996 RA_{1}	—	September 10, 1996	Haleakala	NEAT	·	3.6 km	MPC · JPL
58471	1996 RS_{3}	—	September 13, 1996	Haleakala	NEAT	(5)	2.5 km	MPC · JPL
58472	1996 RV_{3}	—	September 13, 1996	Haleakala	NEAT	·	3.0 km	MPC · JPL
58473	1996 RN_{7}	—	September 5, 1996	Kitt Peak	Spacewatch	L4	10 km	MPC · JPL
58474	1996 RU_{10}	—	September 8, 1996	Kitt Peak	Spacewatch	·	4.2 km	MPC · JPL
58475	1996 RE_{11}	—	September 8, 1996	Kitt Peak	Spacewatch	L4	14 km	MPC · JPL
58476	1996 RQ_{13}	—	September 8, 1996	Kitt Peak	Spacewatch	·	8.7 km	MPC · JPL
58477	1996 RB_{26}	—	September 14, 1996	Haleakala	NEAT	·	2.4 km	MPC · JPL
58478	1996 RC_{29}	—	September 11, 1996	La Silla	Uppsala-DLR Trojan Survey	L4	16 km	MPC · JPL
58479	1996 RJ_{29}	—	September 11, 1996	La Silla	Uppsala-DLR Trojan Survey	L4	15 km	MPC · JPL
58480	1996 RJ_{33}	—	September 15, 1996	La Silla	Uppsala-DLR Trojan Survey	L4	18 km	MPC · JPL
58481	1996 ST_{4}	—	September 20, 1996	Xinglong	SCAP	·	2.0 km	MPC · JPL
58482	1996 TX_{1}	—	October 3, 1996	Xinglong	SCAP	·	4.0 km	MPC · JPL
58483	1996 TB_{2}	—	October 3, 1996	Xinglong	SCAP	·	3.5 km	MPC · JPL
58484	1996 TO_{3}	—	October 8, 1996	Cloudcroft	W. Offutt	EOS	6.0 km	MPC · JPL
58485	1996 TH_{13}	—	October 14, 1996	Kitami	K. Endate, K. Watanabe	(5)	3.2 km	MPC · JPL
58486	1996 TP_{13}	—	October 5, 1996	Xinglong	SCAP	(5)	2.5 km	MPC · JPL
58487	1996 TQ_{29}	—	October 7, 1996	Kitt Peak	Spacewatch	·	2.8 km	MPC · JPL
58488	1996 TV_{33}	—	October 10, 1996	Kitt Peak	Spacewatch	·	3.4 km	MPC · JPL
58489	1996 TF_{34}	—	October 10, 1996	Kitt Peak	Spacewatch	·	4.5 km	MPC · JPL
58490	1996 TZ_{35}	—	October 11, 1996	Kitt Peak	Spacewatch	KOR	3.0 km	MPC · JPL
58491	1996 TG_{38}	—	October 8, 1996	La Silla	E. W. Elst	·	1.6 km	MPC · JPL
58492	1996 TC_{44}	—	October 6, 1996	Kitt Peak	Spacewatch	·	4.5 km	MPC · JPL
58493	1996 TJ_{52}	—	October 5, 1996	La Silla	E. W. Elst	·	2.5 km	MPC · JPL
58494	1996 UF_{1}	—	October 19, 1996	Ondřejov	L. Kotková	EOS	6.8 km	MPC · JPL
58495 Hajin	1996 US_{1}	Hajin	October 19, 1996	Colleverde	V. S. Casulli	EUN	3.8 km	MPC · JPL
58496	1996 UY_{3}	—	October 29, 1996	Xinglong	SCAP	·	3.3 km	MPC · JPL
58497	1996 UK_{4}	—	October 29, 1996	Xinglong	SCAP	·	1.7 km	MPC · JPL
58498 Octaviopaz	1996 VF	Octaviopaz	November 2, 1996	Colleverde	V. S. Casulli	NEM	4.7 km	MPC · JPL
58499 Stüber	1996 VY	Stüber	November 3, 1996	Linz	E. Meyer, E. Obermair	EUN	2.5 km	MPC · JPL
58500	1996 VU_{1}	—	November 6, 1996	Stroncone	A. Vagnozzi	KOR	3.2 km	MPC · JPL

== 58501–58600 ==
back to top

Designation			Discovery			Properties		Ref
Permanent	Provisional	Named after	Date	Site	Discoverer(s)	Category	Diam.	Ref
58501	1996 VQ_{2}	—	November 10, 1996	Sudbury	D. di Cicco	·	1.8 km	MPC · JPL
58502	1996 VH_{3}	—	November 12, 1996	Sudbury	D. di Cicco	·	4.8 km	MPC · JPL
58503	1996 VJ_{3}	—	November 12, 1996	Sudbury	D. di Cicco	·	4.9 km	MPC · JPL
58504	1996 VZ_{3}	—	November 7, 1996	Xinglong	SCAP	·	5.3 km	MPC · JPL
58505	1996 VU_{15}	—	November 5, 1996	Kitt Peak	Spacewatch	·	3.7 km	MPC · JPL
58506	1996 VJ_{22}	—	November 9, 1996	Kitt Peak	Spacewatch	HNS	2.6 km	MPC · JPL
58507	1996 VX_{32}	—	November 5, 1996	Kitt Peak	Spacewatch	MAS	1.9 km	MPC · JPL
58508	1996 WA_{2}	—	November 30, 1996	Dossobuono	Lai, L.	·	2.5 km	MPC · JPL
58509	1996 XB_{1}	—	December 2, 1996	Oizumi	T. Kobayashi	EOS	4.6 km	MPC · JPL
58510	1996 XH_{2}	—	December 3, 1996	Farra d'Isonzo	Farra d'Isonzo	·	6.1 km	MPC · JPL
58511	1996 XB_{4}	—	December 4, 1996	Kitt Peak	Spacewatch	·	5.1 km	MPC · JPL
58512	1996 XR_{4}	—	December 6, 1996	Kitt Peak	Spacewatch	·	4.7 km	MPC · JPL
58513	1996 XW_{11}	—	December 4, 1996	Kitt Peak	Spacewatch	KOR	3.2 km	MPC · JPL
58514	1996 XK_{12}	—	December 4, 1996	Kitt Peak	Spacewatch	·	4.1 km	MPC · JPL
58515	1996 XY_{12}	—	December 8, 1996	Kitt Peak	Spacewatch	·	4.2 km	MPC · JPL
58516	1996 XT_{14}	—	December 11, 1996	Kleť	Kleť	H	1.2 km	MPC · JPL
58517	1997 AJ	—	January 2, 1997	Oizumi	T. Kobayashi	·	5.3 km	MPC · JPL
58518	1997 AC_{2}	—	January 3, 1997	Oizumi	T. Kobayashi	·	10 km	MPC · JPL
58519	1997 AU_{2}	—	January 3, 1997	Oizumi	T. Kobayashi	·	6.2 km	MPC · JPL
58520	1997 AP_{3}	—	January 3, 1997	Kitt Peak	Spacewatch	·	2.2 km	MPC · JPL
58521	1997 AC_{8}	—	January 2, 1997	Kitt Peak	Spacewatch	EOS	4.9 km	MPC · JPL
58522	1997 AW_{19}	—	January 10, 1997	Kitt Peak	Spacewatch	·	4.8 km	MPC · JPL
58523	1997 BU	—	January 27, 1997	Oizumi	T. Kobayashi	·	6.2 km	MPC · JPL
58524	1997 BE_{1}	—	January 26, 1997	Xinglong	SCAP	·	5.5 km	MPC · JPL
58525	1997 BX_{3}	—	January 31, 1997	Kitt Peak	Spacewatch	THM	4.9 km	MPC · JPL
58526	1997 BD_{4}	—	January 31, 1997	Kitt Peak	Spacewatch	·	4.5 km	MPC · JPL
58527	1997 BF_{4}	—	January 31, 1997	Kitt Peak	Spacewatch	·	3.2 km	MPC · JPL
58528	1997 BH_{7}	—	January 28, 1997	Xinglong	SCAP	THM	5.5 km	MPC · JPL
58529	1997 CX	—	February 1, 1997	Oizumi	T. Kobayashi	·	2.0 km	MPC · JPL
58530	1997 CU_{2}	—	February 2, 1997	Kitt Peak	Spacewatch	LIX	7.6 km	MPC · JPL
58531	1997 CS_{4}	—	February 3, 1997	Haleakala	NEAT	·	9.3 km	MPC · JPL
58532	1997 CY_{9}	—	February 2, 1997	Kitt Peak	Spacewatch	·	1.2 km	MPC · JPL
58533	1997 CD_{12}	—	February 3, 1997	Kitt Peak	Spacewatch	PAD	5.5 km	MPC · JPL
58534 Logos	1997 CQ_{29}	Logos	February 4, 1997	Mauna Kea	Mauna Kea	cubewano (cold) · moon · fast	82 km	MPC · JPL
58535 Pattillo	1997 DP	Pattillo	February 16, 1997	Needville	Needville	·	5.5 km	MPC · JPL
58536	1997 EQ_{8}	—	March 2, 1997	Kitt Peak	Spacewatch	AGN	2.2 km	MPC · JPL
58537	1997 EG_{14}	—	March 3, 1997	Kitt Peak	Spacewatch	·	4.1 km	MPC · JPL
58538	1997 EN_{15}	—	March 4, 1997	Kitt Peak	Spacewatch	·	5.7 km	MPC · JPL
58539	1997 ET_{16}	—	March 5, 1997	Kitt Peak	Spacewatch	THM	3.2 km	MPC · JPL
58540	1997 ET_{17}	—	March 3, 1997	Kitami	K. Endate, K. Watanabe	·	3.7 km	MPC · JPL
58541	1997 EA_{18}	—	March 3, 1997	Kitami	K. Endate, K. Watanabe	THM	7.4 km	MPC · JPL
58542	1997 EQ_{22}	—	March 5, 1997	Kitt Peak	Spacewatch	·	7.1 km	MPC · JPL
58543	1997 ET_{32}	—	March 11, 1997	Kitt Peak	Spacewatch	HYG	5.1 km	MPC · JPL
58544	1997 EK_{42}	—	March 10, 1997	Socorro	LINEAR	·	8.6 km	MPC · JPL
58545	1997 EG_{43}	—	March 10, 1997	Socorro	LINEAR	·	3.8 km	MPC · JPL
58546	1997 FQ_{2}	—	March 31, 1997	Socorro	LINEAR	·	7.2 km	MPC · JPL
58547	1997 FZ_{2}	—	March 31, 1997	Socorro	LINEAR	·	7.1 km	MPC · JPL
58548	1997 GK_{12}	—	April 3, 1997	Socorro	LINEAR	·	4.4 km	MPC · JPL
58549	1997 GM_{14}	—	April 3, 1997	Socorro	LINEAR	(5)	2.2 km	MPC · JPL
58550	1997 GN_{19}	—	April 5, 1997	Socorro	LINEAR	·	8.5 km	MPC · JPL
58551	1997 GP_{28}	—	April 7, 1997	Kitt Peak	Spacewatch	·	5.0 km	MPC · JPL
58552	1997 GH_{32}	—	April 3, 1997	Socorro	LINEAR	THM	6.9 km	MPC · JPL
58553	1997 GK_{43}	—	April 2, 1997	Socorro	LINEAR	·	7.6 km	MPC · JPL
58554	1997 HX	—	April 28, 1997	Kitt Peak	Spacewatch	·	6.3 km	MPC · JPL
58555	1997 HA_{3}	—	April 30, 1997	Kitt Peak	Spacewatch	·	1.5 km	MPC · JPL
58556	1997 HH_{7}	—	April 30, 1997	Socorro	LINEAR	·	7.1 km	MPC · JPL
58557	1997 KE_{3}	—	May 30, 1997	Kitt Peak	Spacewatch	EUN	2.5 km	MPC · JPL
58558	1997 LE_{4}	—	June 9, 1997	Prescott	P. G. Comba	·	11 km	MPC · JPL
58559	1997 LT_{5}	—	June 12, 1997	Kitt Peak	Spacewatch	·	5.0 km	MPC · JPL
58560	1997 LK_{11}	—	June 7, 1997	La Silla	E. W. Elst	·	6.4 km	MPC · JPL
58561	1997 ME_{9}	—	June 30, 1997	Kitt Peak	Spacewatch	·	2.5 km	MPC · JPL
58562	1997 NG_{1}	—	July 2, 1997	Kitt Peak	Spacewatch	fast	3.8 km	MPC · JPL
58563	1997 NE_{5}	—	July 1, 1997	Xinglong	SCAP	·	1.7 km	MPC · JPL
58564	1997 NQ_{6}	—	July 9, 1997	Xinglong	SCAP	·	2.7 km	MPC · JPL
58565	1997 OC_{2}	—	July 29, 1997	Majorca	Á. López J., R. Pacheco	·	1.7 km	MPC · JPL
58566	1997 PN_{3}	—	August 5, 1997	Xinglong	SCAP	KOR	3.7 km	MPC · JPL
58567	1997 QB	—	August 21, 1997	Kleť	Z. Moravec	·	2.4 km	MPC · JPL
58568	1997 QM_{1}	—	August 31, 1997	Kleť	Z. Moravec	V	1.1 km	MPC · JPL
58569 Eboshiyamakouen	1997 QY_{2}	Eboshiyamakouen	August 28, 1997	Nanyo	T. Okuni	·	2.6 km	MPC · JPL
58570	1997 RD_{4}	—	September 3, 1997	Caussols	ODAS	·	2.0 km	MPC · JPL
58571 Barbaraserf	1997 RB_{5}	Barbaraserf	September 8, 1997	Caussols	ODAS	·	1.5 km	MPC · JPL
58572 Romanella	1997 RV_{6}	Romanella	September 7, 1997	Montelupo	M. Tombelli, G. Forti	·	2.1 km	MPC · JPL
58573 Serpieri	1997 RD_{7}	Serpieri	September 9, 1997	Pianoro	V. Goretti	·	1.9 km	MPC · JPL
58574	1997 RD_{8}	—	September 11, 1997	Kleť	Kleť	·	1.6 km	MPC · JPL
58575	1997 RK_{9}	—	September 11, 1997	Haleakala	AMOS	·	5.8 km	MPC · JPL
58576	1997 RQ_{9}	—	September 4, 1997	Xinglong	SCAP	·	2.2 km	MPC · JPL
58577	1997 SV	—	September 16, 1997	Xinglong	SCAP	V	2.7 km	MPC · JPL
58578 Žídek	1997 SP_{2}	Žídek	September 24, 1997	Ondřejov	L. Kotková	NYS	2.6 km	MPC · JPL
58579 Ehrenberg	1997 SQ_{2}	Ehrenberg	September 24, 1997	Ondřejov	L. Kotková	·	1.2 km	MPC · JPL
58580 Elenacuoghi	1997 SW_{2}	Elenacuoghi	September 24, 1997	Bologna	Colombini, E.	·	2.0 km	MPC · JPL
58581	1997 SB_{3}	—	September 24, 1997	Farra d'Isonzo	Farra d'Isonzo	·	2.1 km	MPC · JPL
58582	1997 SF_{3}	—	September 25, 1997	Kleť	Kleť	V	2.2 km	MPC · JPL
58583	1997 SV_{4}	—	September 25, 1997	Dossobuono	Lai, L.	·	2.1 km	MPC · JPL
58584	1997 SE_{11}	—	September 29, 1997	Zeno	T. Stafford	·	4.7 km	MPC · JPL
58585	1997 SX_{11}	—	September 27, 1997	Kitt Peak	Spacewatch	·	2.0 km	MPC · JPL
58586	1997 SG_{23}	—	September 29, 1997	Kitt Peak	Spacewatch	·	3.0 km	MPC · JPL
58587	1997 SK_{23}	—	September 29, 1997	Kitt Peak	Spacewatch	·	2.3 km	MPC · JPL
58588	1997 SV_{23}	—	September 29, 1997	Kitt Peak	Spacewatch	NYS	3.0 km	MPC · JPL
58589	1997 SF_{25}	—	September 29, 1997	Nachi-Katsuura	Y. Shimizu, T. Urata	V	2.6 km	MPC · JPL
58590	1997 SX_{30}	—	September 29, 1997	Črni Vrh	Mikuž, H.	V	1.5 km	MPC · JPL
58591	1997 SV_{31}	—	September 29, 1997	Xinglong	SCAP	·	1.9 km	MPC · JPL
58592	1997 SB_{35}	—	September 30, 1997	Kitt Peak	Spacewatch	EOS	6.1 km	MPC · JPL
58593	1997 TD_{2}	—	October 3, 1997	Caussols	ODAS	·	2.5 km	MPC · JPL
58594	1997 TF_{9}	—	October 2, 1997	Kitt Peak	Spacewatch	NYS	2.5 km	MPC · JPL
58595 Joepollock	1997 TX_{9}	Joepollock	October 5, 1997	Ondřejov	P. Pravec	·	2.9 km	MPC · JPL
58596	1997 TC_{10}	—	October 6, 1997	Ondřejov	P. Pravec	MAS	1.3 km	MPC · JPL
58597	1997 TH_{10}	—	October 6, 1997	Ondřejov	P. Pravec	(5)	2.5 km	MPC · JPL
58598	1997 TX_{11}	—	October 7, 1997	Xinglong	SCAP	·	2.3 km	MPC · JPL
58599	1997 TK_{13}	—	October 3, 1997	Kitt Peak	Spacewatch	·	3.5 km	MPC · JPL
58600 Iwamuroonsen	1997 TC_{17}	Iwamuroonsen	October 5, 1997	Nanyo	T. Okuni	·	2.1 km	MPC · JPL

== 58601–58700 ==
back to top

Designation			Discovery			Properties		Ref
Permanent	Provisional	Named after	Date	Site	Discoverer(s)	Category	Diam.	Ref
58601	1997 TW_{18}	—	October 7, 1997	Xinglong	SCAP	·	2.1 km	MPC · JPL
58602	1997 TG_{25}	—	October 11, 1997	Ondřejov	L. Kotková	MAS	1.6 km	MPC · JPL
58603	1997 TM_{25}	—	October 11, 1997	Xinglong	SCAP	·	3.8 km	MPC · JPL
58604	1997 TT_{26}	—	October 15, 1997	Xinglong	SCAP	·	3.2 km	MPC · JPL
58605 Liutungsheng	1997 TA_{27}	Liutungsheng	October 8, 1997	Xinglong	SCAP	NYS	4.0 km	MPC · JPL
58606 Charlestrenet	1997 TF_{27}	Charlestrenet	October 4, 1997	Caussols	ODAS	·	3.1 km	MPC · JPL
58607 Wenzel	1997 UL	Wenzel	October 19, 1997	Kleť	J. Tichá, M. Tichý	·	2.0 km	MPC · JPL
58608 Geroldrichter	1997 UY	Geroldrichter	October 22, 1997	Kleť	M. Tichý	·	2.9 km	MPC · JPL
58609	1997 UZ_{1}	—	October 23, 1997	Kitt Peak	Spacewatch	V	1.7 km	MPC · JPL
58610	1997 UN_{3}	—	October 26, 1997	Oizumi	T. Kobayashi	(5)	3.1 km	MPC · JPL
58611	1997 UC_{4}	—	October 17, 1997	Xinglong	SCAP	·	2.2 km	MPC · JPL
58612	1997 UA_{5}	—	October 21, 1997	Xinglong	SCAP	·	3.0 km	MPC · JPL
58613	1997 UN_{7}	—	October 25, 1997	Chichibu	N. Satō	·	2.5 km	MPC · JPL
58614	1997 UO_{7}	—	October 25, 1997	Chichibu	N. Satō	·	2.4 km	MPC · JPL
58615	1997 UP_{13}	—	October 23, 1997	Kitt Peak	Spacewatch	·	3.5 km	MPC · JPL
58616	1997 UT_{17}	—	October 25, 1997	Kitt Peak	Spacewatch	HYG	6.3 km	MPC · JPL
58617	1997 UC_{21}	—	October 31, 1997	Xinglong	SCAP	V	2.0 km	MPC · JPL
58618	1997 UU_{21}	—	October 29, 1997	Nanyo	T. Okuni	NYS ·	3.4 km	MPC · JPL
58619	1997 UF_{22}	—	October 26, 1997	Chichibu	N. Satō	·	3.5 km	MPC · JPL
58620	1997 UG_{22}	—	October 26, 1997	Chichibu	N. Satō	V	2.5 km	MPC · JPL
58621	1997 UR_{23}	—	October 27, 1997	Anderson Mesa	B. A. Skiff	NYS ·	4.5 km	MPC · JPL
58622 Setoguchi	1997 VU	Setoguchi	November 2, 1997	Yatsuka	H. Abe, S. Miyasaka	MAR	2.7 km	MPC · JPL
58623	1997 VZ_{1}	—	November 1, 1997	Oizumi	T. Kobayashi	·	3.1 km	MPC · JPL
58624	1997 VC_{2}	—	November 1, 1997	Oizumi	T. Kobayashi	EOS	5.0 km	MPC · JPL
58625	1997 VE_{2}	—	November 1, 1997	Kitami	K. Endate, K. Watanabe	slow	3.1 km	MPC · JPL
58626	1997 VF_{5}	—	November 1, 1997	Kushiro	S. Ueda, H. Kaneda	·	4.8 km	MPC · JPL
58627 Rieko	1997 VG_{5}	Rieko	November 8, 1997	Toyama	M. Aoki	·	2.4 km	MPC · JPL
58628	1997 VP_{7}	—	November 2, 1997	Xinglong	SCAP	·	5.6 km	MPC · JPL
58629	1997 VL_{8}	—	November 1, 1997	Xinglong	SCAP	·	4.3 km	MPC · JPL
58630	1997 WC	—	November 18, 1997	Oizumi	T. Kobayashi	V	1.7 km	MPC · JPL
58631	1997 WE_{2}	—	November 23, 1997	Oizumi	T. Kobayashi	·	7.3 km	MPC · JPL
58632	1997 WM_{2}	—	November 23, 1997	Oizumi	T. Kobayashi	KOR	3.3 km	MPC · JPL
58633	1997 WY_{2}	—	November 23, 1997	Oizumi	T. Kobayashi	·	3.9 km	MPC · JPL
58634	1997 WF_{3}	—	November 23, 1997	Oizumi	T. Kobayashi	MAS	1.7 km	MPC · JPL
58635	1997 WQ_{6}	—	November 23, 1997	Kitt Peak	Spacewatch	·	2.3 km	MPC · JPL
58636	1997 WQ_{13}	—	November 21, 1997	Kitt Peak	Spacewatch	·	4.9 km	MPC · JPL
58637	1997 WT_{14}	—	November 23, 1997	Kitt Peak	Spacewatch	V	2.5 km	MPC · JPL
58638	1997 WA_{17}	—	November 23, 1997	Kitt Peak	Spacewatch	·	6.2 km	MPC · JPL
58639	1997 WZ_{17}	—	November 23, 1997	Kitt Peak	Spacewatch	·	3.2 km	MPC · JPL
58640	1997 WH_{18}	—	November 23, 1997	Kitt Peak	Spacewatch	·	2.2 km	MPC · JPL
58641	1997 WX_{20}	—	November 29, 1997	Kitt Peak	Spacewatch	BAR	3.3 km	MPC · JPL
58642	1997 WL_{24}	—	November 25, 1997	Kitt Peak	Spacewatch	·	2.4 km	MPC · JPL
58643	1997 WO_{25}	—	November 28, 1997	Kitt Peak	Spacewatch	·	3.5 km	MPC · JPL
58644	1997 WU_{31}	—	November 29, 1997	Socorro	LINEAR	(5)	2.6 km	MPC · JPL
58645	1997 WT_{33}	—	November 29, 1997	Socorro	LINEAR	·	4.8 km	MPC · JPL
58646	1997 WD_{35}	—	November 29, 1997	Socorro	LINEAR	·	3.5 km	MPC · JPL
58647	1997 WW_{35}	—	November 29, 1997	Socorro	LINEAR	·	2.6 km	MPC · JPL
58648	1997 WZ_{36}	—	November 29, 1997	Socorro	LINEAR	NYS ·	4.2 km	MPC · JPL
58649	1997 WL_{38}	—	November 29, 1997	Socorro	LINEAR	SUL	5.8 km	MPC · JPL
58650	1997 WR_{39}	—	November 29, 1997	Socorro	LINEAR	·	1.8 km	MPC · JPL
58651	1997 WL_{42}	—	November 29, 1997	Socorro	LINEAR	slow	2.3 km	MPC · JPL
58652	1997 WD_{43}	—	November 29, 1997	Socorro	LINEAR	·	3.1 km	MPC · JPL
58653	1997 WV_{45}	—	November 26, 1997	Socorro	LINEAR	·	2.4 km	MPC · JPL
58654	1997 WA_{48}	—	November 26, 1997	Socorro	LINEAR	(5)	2.5 km	MPC · JPL
58655	1997 WU_{49}	—	November 26, 1997	Socorro	LINEAR	·	3.5 km	MPC · JPL
58656	1997 WT_{50}	—	November 29, 1997	Socorro	LINEAR	·	2.7 km	MPC · JPL
58657	1997 WG_{54}	—	November 29, 1997	Socorro	LINEAR	·	2.7 km	MPC · JPL
58658	1997 WY_{57}	—	November 27, 1997	La Silla	Uppsala-DLR Trojan Survey	·	2.7 km	MPC · JPL
58659	1997 WZ_{57}	—	November 27, 1997	La Silla	Uppsala-DLR Trojan Survey	slow	2.6 km	MPC · JPL
58660	1997 XR	—	December 3, 1997	Oizumi	T. Kobayashi	·	1.6 km	MPC · JPL
58661	1997 XU	—	December 3, 1997	Oizumi	T. Kobayashi	·	4.4 km	MPC · JPL
58662	1997 XJ_{2}	—	December 3, 1997	Chichibu	N. Satō	·	3.4 km	MPC · JPL
58663	1997 XZ_{10}	—	December 9, 1997	Dynic	A. Sugie	·	2.6 km	MPC · JPL
58664 IYAMMIX	1997 YA_{1}	IYAMMIX	December 21, 1997	Kleť	J. Tichá, M. Tichý	·	4.7 km	MPC · JPL
58665	1997 YO_{1}	—	December 19, 1997	Xinglong	SCAP	·	4.2 km	MPC · JPL
58666	1997 YJ_{2}	—	December 21, 1997	Oizumi	T. Kobayashi	·	5.8 km	MPC · JPL
58667	1997 YS_{2}	—	December 21, 1997	Chichibu	N. Satō	·	2.7 km	MPC · JPL
58668	1997 YJ_{3}	—	December 17, 1997	Xinglong	SCAP	·	2.7 km	MPC · JPL
58669	1997 YF_{5}	—	December 20, 1997	Bédoin	P. Antonini	·	1.6 km	MPC · JPL
58670	1997 YA_{6}	—	December 25, 1997	Oizumi	T. Kobayashi	(5)	4.1 km	MPC · JPL
58671 Diplodocus	1997 YC_{8}	Diplodocus	December 25, 1997	Needville	C. Gustava, Rivich, K.	·	2.8 km	MPC · JPL
58672 Remigio	1997 YT_{8}	Remigio	December 28, 1997	Monte Viseggi	Viseggi, Monte	·	5.6 km	MPC · JPL
58673	1997 YA_{9}	—	December 25, 1997	Haleakala	NEAT	·	3.7 km	MPC · JPL
58674	1997 YG_{12}	—	December 21, 1997	Kitt Peak	Spacewatch	·	4.9 km	MPC · JPL
58675	1997 YD_{14}	—	December 31, 1997	Oizumi	T. Kobayashi	·	9.0 km	MPC · JPL
58676	1997 YN_{16}	—	December 31, 1997	Nachi-Katsuura	Y. Shimizu, T. Urata	·	2.5 km	MPC · JPL
58677	1997 YJ_{17}	—	December 28, 1997	Kitt Peak	Spacewatch	·	1.7 km	MPC · JPL
58678	1997 YE_{18}	—	December 24, 1997	Xinglong	SCAP	·	8.8 km	MPC · JPL
58679 Brenig	1998 AH	Brenig	January 1, 1998	Bornheim	Ehring, N.	·	3.9 km	MPC · JPL
58680	1998 AO_{5}	—	January 8, 1998	Caussols	ODAS	·	7.4 km	MPC · JPL
58681	1998 AJ_{7}	—	January 5, 1998	Xinglong	SCAP	(5)	3.9 km	MPC · JPL
58682 Alenašolcová	1998 AL_{8}	Alenašolcová	January 10, 1998	Kleť	J. Tichá, M. Tichý	·	6.3 km	MPC · JPL
58683 Jeanmouette	1998 AJ_{10}	Jeanmouette	January 15, 1998	Caussols	ODAS	·	2.4 km	MPC · JPL
58684	1998 AA_{11}	—	January 2, 1998	Socorro	LINEAR	NYS	2.7 km	MPC · JPL
58685	1998 BP	—	January 18, 1998	Oizumi	T. Kobayashi	·	1.9 km	MPC · JPL
58686	1998 BB_{1}	—	January 19, 1998	Oizumi	T. Kobayashi	·	4.5 km	MPC · JPL
58687	1998 BJ_{3}	—	January 18, 1998	Kitt Peak	Spacewatch	·	1.5 km	MPC · JPL
58688	1998 BJ_{4}	—	January 21, 1998	Nachi-Katsuura	Y. Shimizu, T. Urata	·	10 km	MPC · JPL
58689	1998 BY_{9}	—	January 22, 1998	Kitt Peak	Spacewatch	·	3.3 km	MPC · JPL
58690	1998 BP_{10}	—	January 27, 1998	Kleť	Kleť	·	2.1 km	MPC · JPL
58691 Luigisannino	1998 BG_{14}	Luigisannino	January 24, 1998	Monte Viseggi	G. Scarfì, L. Zannoni	·	2.8 km	MPC · JPL
58692	1998 BF_{17}	—	January 22, 1998	Kitt Peak	Spacewatch	·	3.0 km	MPC · JPL
58693	1998 BG_{25}	—	January 28, 1998	Oizumi	T. Kobayashi	·	3.6 km	MPC · JPL
58694	1998 BQ_{25}	—	January 27, 1998	Kleť	Kleť	·	4.1 km	MPC · JPL
58695	1998 BJ_{26}	—	January 28, 1998	Caussols	ODAS	MAS	1.9 km	MPC · JPL
58696	1998 BW_{26}	—	January 18, 1998	Kitt Peak	Spacewatch	·	3.3 km	MPC · JPL
58697	1998 BL_{27}	—	January 22, 1998	Kitt Peak	Spacewatch	·	3.6 km	MPC · JPL
58698	1998 BE_{31}	—	January 26, 1998	Kitt Peak	Spacewatch	·	2.1 km	MPC · JPL
58699	1998 BK_{42}	—	January 26, 1998	Xinglong	SCAP	PHO	2.6 km	MPC · JPL
58700 Darson	1998 BQ_{42}	Darson	January 18, 1998	Caussols	ODAS	NYS	2.5 km	MPC · JPL

== 58701–58800 ==
back to top

Designation			Discovery			Properties		Ref
Permanent	Provisional	Named after	Date	Site	Discoverer(s)	Category	Diam.	Ref
58701	1998 BR_{42}	—	January 18, 1998	Caussols	ODAS	·	12 km	MPC · JPL
58702 Tizianabitossi	1998 BX_{43}	Tizianabitossi	January 25, 1998	Cima Ekar	M. Tombelli, G. Forti	·	5.2 km	MPC · JPL
58703	1998 BH_{44}	—	January 23, 1998	Socorro	LINEAR	·	5.1 km	MPC · JPL
58704	1998 BA_{46}	—	January 26, 1998	Kitt Peak	Spacewatch	THM	6.3 km	MPC · JPL
58705	1998 BN_{47}	—	January 25, 1998	Haleakala	NEAT	·	3.7 km	MPC · JPL
58706	1998 CD	—	February 1, 1998	Oizumi	T. Kobayashi	·	2.7 km	MPC · JPL
58707 Kyoshi	1998 CS	Kyoshi	February 2, 1998	Kuma Kogen	A. Nakamura	·	4.2 km	MPC · JPL
58708	1998 CX_{1}	—	February 6, 1998	Xinglong	SCAP	·	1.8 km	MPC · JPL
58709 Zenocolò	1998 CT_{2}	Zenocolò	February 14, 1998	San Marcello	L. Tesi, G. Forti	·	5.5 km	MPC · JPL
58710	1998 CH_{3}	—	February 6, 1998	La Silla	E. W. Elst	·	6.5 km	MPC · JPL
58711	1998 CM_{3}	—	February 6, 1998	La Silla	E. W. Elst	·	3.5 km	MPC · JPL
58712	1998 CX_{4}	—	February 6, 1998	La Silla	E. W. Elst	·	4.0 km	MPC · JPL
58713	1998 DS	—	February 19, 1998	Modra	A. Galád, Pravda, A.	NYS	3.7 km	MPC · JPL
58714 Boya	1998 DS_{2}	Boya	February 16, 1998	Xinglong	SCAP	·	2.9 km	MPC · JPL
58715	1998 DK_{3}	—	February 22, 1998	Haleakala	NEAT	·	2.5 km	MPC · JPL
58716	1998 DU_{4}	—	February 22, 1998	Haleakala	NEAT	·	4.4 km	MPC · JPL
58717	1998 DE_{8}	—	February 21, 1998	Xinglong	SCAP	·	4.0 km	MPC · JPL
58718	1998 DN_{9}	—	February 22, 1998	Haleakala	NEAT	·	6.2 km	MPC · JPL
58719	1998 DY_{10}	—	February 17, 1998	Xinglong	SCAP	MRX	3.1 km	MPC · JPL
58720	1998 DD_{11}	—	February 19, 1998	Majorca	Á. López J., R. Pacheco	·	5.1 km	MPC · JPL
58721	1998 DX_{14}	—	February 22, 1998	Haleakala	NEAT	·	15 km	MPC · JPL
58722	1998 DN_{17}	—	February 23, 1998	Kitt Peak	Spacewatch	·	5.5 km	MPC · JPL
58723	1998 DU_{17}	—	February 23, 1998	Kitt Peak	Spacewatch	·	2.8 km	MPC · JPL
58724	1998 DY_{17}	—	February 23, 1998	Kitt Peak	Spacewatch	·	3.7 km	MPC · JPL
58725	1998 DZ_{18}	—	February 24, 1998	Kitt Peak	Spacewatch	·	3.1 km	MPC · JPL
58726	1998 DG_{19}	—	February 24, 1998	Kitt Peak	Spacewatch	·	5.0 km	MPC · JPL
58727	1998 DA_{21}	—	February 22, 1998	Kitt Peak	Spacewatch	·	2.4 km	MPC · JPL
58728	1998 DR_{23}	—	February 19, 1998	Farra d'Isonzo	Farra d'Isonzo	·	2.9 km	MPC · JPL
58729	1998 DJ_{24}	—	February 22, 1998	Kitt Peak	Spacewatch	EUN	3.4 km	MPC · JPL
58730	1998 DR_{28}	—	February 26, 1998	Kitt Peak	Spacewatch	·	6.8 km	MPC · JPL
58731	1998 DE_{32}	—	February 21, 1998	Xinglong	SCAP	·	4.0 km	MPC · JPL
58732	1998 DL_{34}	—	February 27, 1998	La Silla	E. W. Elst	·	6.8 km	MPC · JPL
58733	1998 DH_{35}	—	February 27, 1998	La Silla	E. W. Elst	EUN · slow	4.1 km	MPC · JPL
58734 Jeantarde	1998 EP	Jeantarde	March 2, 1998	Caussols	ODAS	·	2.2 km	MPC · JPL
58735	1998 EP_{2}	—	March 2, 1998	Caussols	ODAS	NYS	3.4 km	MPC · JPL
58736 Karlantier	1998 EO_{6}	Karlantier	March 1, 1998	Caussols	ODAS	(5)	3.7 km	MPC · JPL
58737	1998 EA_{10}	—	March 14, 1998	Xinglong	SCAP	EUN	3.6 km	MPC · JPL
58738	1998 EX_{10}	—	March 1, 1998	La Silla	E. W. Elst	·	2.1 km	MPC · JPL
58739	1998 EZ_{11}	—	March 1, 1998	La Silla	E. W. Elst	·	2.6 km	MPC · JPL
58740	1998 ES_{12}	—	March 1, 1998	La Silla	E. W. Elst	THM	5.2 km	MPC · JPL
58741	1998 EZ_{12}	—	March 1, 1998	La Silla	E. W. Elst	·	7.9 km	MPC · JPL
58742	1998 EG_{13}	—	March 1, 1998	La Silla	E. W. Elst	(13314)	3.2 km	MPC · JPL
58743	1998 EJ_{13}	—	March 1, 1998	La Silla	E. W. Elst	NYS	2.4 km	MPC · JPL
58744	1998 EN_{13}	—	March 1, 1998	La Silla	E. W. Elst	HYG	6.9 km	MPC · JPL
58745	1998 FM_{3}	—	March 20, 1998	Kitt Peak	Spacewatch	KOR	2.8 km	MPC · JPL
58746	1998 FS_{3}	—	March 20, 1998	Kitt Peak	Spacewatch	·	3.1 km	MPC · JPL
58747	1998 FJ_{5}	—	March 24, 1998	Socorro	LINEAR	H	1.5 km	MPC · JPL
58748	1998 FB_{9}	—	March 22, 1998	Kitt Peak	Spacewatch	·	6.0 km	MPC · JPL
58749	1998 FG_{10}	—	March 24, 1998	Caussols	ODAS	AGN	4.0 km	MPC · JPL
58750 Simonjeanne	1998 FY_{10}	Simonjeanne	March 25, 1998	Caussols	ODAS	·	6.3 km	MPC · JPL
58751	1998 FZ_{11}	—	March 24, 1998	Haleakala	NEAT	·	2.5 km	MPC · JPL
58752	1998 FF_{12}	—	March 26, 1998	Kleť	Kleť	·	2.3 km	MPC · JPL
58753	1998 FO_{12}	—	March 20, 1998	Xinglong	SCAP	·	3.0 km	MPC · JPL
58754	1998 FT_{12}	—	March 21, 1998	Xinglong	SCAP	·	2.3 km	MPC · JPL
58755	1998 FS_{14}	—	March 26, 1998	Caussols	ODAS	EOS	4.4 km	MPC · JPL
58756 Malgoyre	1998 FR_{15}	Malgoyre	March 28, 1998	Caussols	ODAS	·	5.2 km	MPC · JPL
58757	1998 FF_{18}	—	March 20, 1998	Socorro	LINEAR	·	6.8 km	MPC · JPL
58758	1998 FO_{18}	—	March 20, 1998	Socorro	LINEAR	·	3.9 km	MPC · JPL
58759	1998 FZ_{18}	—	March 20, 1998	Socorro	LINEAR	slow	5.8 km	MPC · JPL
58760	1998 FB_{21}	—	March 20, 1998	Socorro	LINEAR	·	4.1 km	MPC · JPL
58761	1998 FH_{24}	—	March 20, 1998	Socorro	LINEAR	·	5.2 km	MPC · JPL
58762	1998 FJ_{24}	—	March 20, 1998	Socorro	LINEAR	MAR	4.6 km	MPC · JPL
58763	1998 FR_{25}	—	March 20, 1998	Socorro	LINEAR	·	4.7 km	MPC · JPL
58764	1998 FE_{27}	—	March 20, 1998	Socorro	LINEAR	·	6.3 km	MPC · JPL
58765	1998 FZ_{33}	—	March 20, 1998	Socorro	LINEAR	·	4.2 km	MPC · JPL
58766	1998 FS_{34}	—	March 20, 1998	Socorro	LINEAR	·	5.2 km	MPC · JPL
58767	1998 FQ_{39}	—	March 20, 1998	Socorro	LINEAR	·	4.6 km	MPC · JPL
58768	1998 FQ_{40}	—	March 20, 1998	Socorro	LINEAR	V	1.2 km	MPC · JPL
58769	1998 FS_{45}	—	March 20, 1998	Socorro	LINEAR	·	6.8 km	MPC · JPL
58770	1998 FM_{49}	—	March 20, 1998	Socorro	LINEAR	·	4.3 km	MPC · JPL
58771	1998 FP_{49}	—	March 20, 1998	Socorro	LINEAR	KOR	4.1 km	MPC · JPL
58772	1998 FB_{56}	—	March 20, 1998	Socorro	LINEAR	AGN	3.2 km	MPC · JPL
58773	1998 FE_{57}	—	March 20, 1998	Socorro	LINEAR	KOR	3.6 km	MPC · JPL
58774	1998 FA_{58}	—	March 20, 1998	Socorro	LINEAR	EOS	6.2 km	MPC · JPL
58775	1998 FR_{59}	—	March 20, 1998	Socorro	LINEAR	·	9.7 km	MPC · JPL
58776	1998 FG_{60}	—	March 20, 1998	Socorro	LINEAR	TEL	3.5 km	MPC · JPL
58777	1998 FN_{65}	—	March 20, 1998	Socorro	LINEAR	·	5.2 km	MPC · JPL
58778	1998 FS_{66}	—	March 20, 1998	Socorro	LINEAR	·	5.4 km	MPC · JPL
58779	1998 FA_{70}	—	March 20, 1998	Socorro	LINEAR	·	2.9 km	MPC · JPL
58780	1998 FL_{70}	—	March 20, 1998	Socorro	LINEAR	·	2.4 km	MPC · JPL
58781	1998 FX_{72}	—	March 26, 1998	Caussols	ODAS	·	4.6 km	MPC · JPL
58782 Suhelahmeti	1998 FY_{72}	Suhelahmeti	March 26, 1998	Caussols	ODAS	·	2.5 km	MPC · JPL
58783	1998 FN_{74}	—	March 21, 1998	Bergisch Gladbach	W. Bickel	·	3.3 km	MPC · JPL
58784	1998 FJ_{75}	—	March 24, 1998	Socorro	LINEAR	EOS	6.3 km	MPC · JPL
58785	1998 FT_{77}	—	March 24, 1998	Socorro	LINEAR	GEF	4.2 km	MPC · JPL
58786	1998 FD_{78}	—	March 24, 1998	Socorro	LINEAR	·	1.5 km	MPC · JPL
58787	1998 FW_{78}	—	March 24, 1998	Socorro	LINEAR	·	5.4 km	MPC · JPL
58788	1998 FW_{79}	—	March 24, 1998	Socorro	LINEAR	ANF	4.3 km	MPC · JPL
58789	1998 FK_{80}	—	March 24, 1998	Socorro	LINEAR	BRA	5.1 km	MPC · JPL
58790	1998 FN_{81}	—	March 24, 1998	Socorro	LINEAR	(21344)	5.0 km	MPC · JPL
58791	1998 FH_{82}	—	March 24, 1998	Socorro	LINEAR	EUN	4.3 km	MPC · JPL
58792	1998 FF_{84}	—	March 24, 1998	Socorro	LINEAR	CLO	4.7 km	MPC · JPL
58793	1998 FJ_{84}	—	March 24, 1998	Socorro	LINEAR	DOR	7.0 km	MPC · JPL
58794	1998 FW_{84}	—	March 24, 1998	Socorro	LINEAR	·	11 km	MPC · JPL
58795	1998 FE_{87}	—	March 24, 1998	Socorro	LINEAR	·	6.8 km	MPC · JPL
58796	1998 FO_{94}	—	March 24, 1998	Socorro	LINEAR	HYG	6.5 km	MPC · JPL
58797	1998 FU_{98}	—	March 31, 1998	Socorro	LINEAR	·	12 km	MPC · JPL
58798	1998 FU_{100}	—	March 31, 1998	Socorro	LINEAR	EOS	6.0 km	MPC · JPL
58799	1998 FG_{103}	—	March 31, 1998	Socorro	LINEAR	·	2.1 km	MPC · JPL
58800	1998 FF_{104}	—	March 31, 1998	Socorro	LINEAR	·	5.8 km	MPC · JPL

== 58801–58900 ==
back to top

Designation			Discovery			Properties		Ref
Permanent	Provisional	Named after	Date	Site	Discoverer(s)	Category	Diam.	Ref
58801	1998 FP_{105}	—	March 31, 1998	Socorro	LINEAR	EOS ·	4.1 km	MPC · JPL
58802	1998 FW_{106}	—	March 31, 1998	Socorro	LINEAR	·	4.5 km	MPC · JPL
58803	1998 FX_{109}	—	March 31, 1998	Socorro	LINEAR	·	3.1 km	MPC · JPL
58804	1998 FM_{110}	—	March 31, 1998	Socorro	LINEAR	·	7.7 km	MPC · JPL
58805	1998 FN_{113}	—	March 31, 1998	Socorro	LINEAR	EOS	4.7 km	MPC · JPL
58806	1998 FF_{117}	—	March 31, 1998	Socorro	LINEAR	·	4.2 km	MPC · JPL
58807	1998 FN_{127}	—	March 24, 1998	Socorro	LINEAR	·	2.8 km	MPC · JPL
58808	1998 FV_{127}	—	March 25, 1998	Socorro	LINEAR	HYG	7.2 km	MPC · JPL
58809	1998 FX_{130}	—	March 22, 1998	Socorro	LINEAR	AGN	2.9 km	MPC · JPL
58810	1998 FR_{136}	—	March 28, 1998	Socorro	LINEAR	·	3.0 km	MPC · JPL
58811	1998 FQ_{145}	—	March 24, 1998	Socorro	LINEAR	·	4.8 km	MPC · JPL
58812	1998 GM	—	April 3, 1998	Kitt Peak	Spacewatch	·	2.4 km	MPC · JPL
58813	1998 GP_{4}	—	April 2, 1998	Socorro	LINEAR	·	10 km	MPC · JPL
58814	1998 GQ_{6}	—	April 2, 1998	Socorro	LINEAR	·	7.0 km	MPC · JPL
58815	1998 GR_{8}	—	April 2, 1998	Socorro	LINEAR	·	4.1 km	MPC · JPL
58816	1998 GU_{10}	—	April 2, 1998	La Silla	E. W. Elst	GEF	3.0 km	MPC · JPL
58817	1998 GJ_{11}	—	April 15, 1998	Socorro	LINEAR	BAR	2.1 km	MPC · JPL
58818	1998 HE_{2}	—	April 20, 1998	Ondřejov	L. Kotková	EOS	7.0 km	MPC · JPL
58819	1998 HF_{3}	—	April 21, 1998	Modra	L. Kornoš, P. Kolény	·	5.3 km	MPC · JPL
58820	1998 HN_{5}	—	April 22, 1998	Kitt Peak	Spacewatch	EUN	2.1 km	MPC · JPL
58821	1998 HZ_{5}	—	April 21, 1998	Caussols	ODAS	·	6.8 km	MPC · JPL
58822	1998 HO_{7}	—	April 23, 1998	Socorro	LINEAR	H	1.2 km	MPC · JPL
58823	1998 HR_{8}	—	April 17, 1998	Kitt Peak	Spacewatch	·	1.5 km	MPC · JPL
58824	1998 HY_{10}	—	April 17, 1998	Kitt Peak	Spacewatch	EOS	5.5 km	MPC · JPL
58825	1998 HE_{11}	—	April 17, 1998	Kitt Peak	Spacewatch	·	8.7 km	MPC · JPL
58826	1998 HC_{15}	—	April 18, 1998	Kitt Peak	Spacewatch	·	3.9 km	MPC · JPL
58827	1998 HH_{15}	—	April 20, 1998	Kitt Peak	Spacewatch	EOS	4.9 km	MPC · JPL
58828	1998 HM_{15}	—	April 20, 1998	Kitt Peak	Spacewatch	·	4.3 km	MPC · JPL
58829	1998 HF_{19}	—	April 18, 1998	Socorro	LINEAR	·	7.2 km	MPC · JPL
58830	1998 HE_{23}	—	April 20, 1998	Socorro	LINEAR	·	5.4 km	MPC · JPL
58831	1998 HN_{30}	—	April 20, 1998	Socorro	LINEAR	(12739)	4.8 km	MPC · JPL
58832	1998 HU_{31}	—	April 22, 1998	Socorro	LINEAR	H	1.5 km	MPC · JPL
58833	1998 HM_{33}	—	April 20, 1998	Socorro	LINEAR	·	10 km	MPC · JPL
58834	1998 HN_{37}	—	April 20, 1998	Socorro	LINEAR	EUN	2.6 km	MPC · JPL
58835	1998 HG_{39}	—	April 20, 1998	Socorro	LINEAR	·	4.7 km	MPC · JPL
58836	1998 HA_{43}	—	April 24, 1998	Kitt Peak	Spacewatch	GEF	2.8 km	MPC · JPL
58837	1998 HQ_{46}	—	April 20, 1998	Socorro	LINEAR	EOS	5.3 km	MPC · JPL
58838	1998 HO_{50}	—	April 29, 1998	Kitt Peak	Spacewatch	EOS	4.1 km	MPC · JPL
58839	1998 HZ_{50}	—	April 25, 1998	Anderson Mesa	LONEOS	DOR	7.0 km	MPC · JPL
58840	1998 HT_{53}	—	April 21, 1998	Socorro	LINEAR	·	3.2 km	MPC · JPL
58841	1998 HT_{54}	—	April 21, 1998	Socorro	LINEAR	EUN	5.1 km	MPC · JPL
58842	1998 HP_{55}	—	April 21, 1998	Socorro	LINEAR	(5)	2.4 km	MPC · JPL
58843	1998 HB_{59}	—	April 21, 1998	Socorro	LINEAR	·	6.0 km	MPC · JPL
58844	1998 HV_{60}	—	April 21, 1998	Socorro	LINEAR	·	9.3 km	MPC · JPL
58845	1998 HZ_{60}	—	April 21, 1998	Socorro	LINEAR	EUN	3.7 km	MPC · JPL
58846	1998 HN_{63}	—	April 21, 1998	Socorro	LINEAR	·	6.4 km	MPC · JPL
58847	1998 HO_{68}	—	April 21, 1998	Socorro	LINEAR	·	13 km	MPC · JPL
58848	1998 HH_{71}	—	April 21, 1998	Socorro	LINEAR	·	1.5 km	MPC · JPL
58849	1998 HZ_{72}	—	April 21, 1998	Socorro	LINEAR	·	5.6 km	MPC · JPL
58850	1998 HH_{74}	—	April 21, 1998	Socorro	LINEAR	KOR	3.1 km	MPC · JPL
58851	1998 HY_{77}	—	April 21, 1998	Socorro	LINEAR	·	5.7 km	MPC · JPL
58852	1998 HE_{84}	—	April 21, 1998	Socorro	LINEAR	·	5.4 km	MPC · JPL
58853	1998 HD_{85}	—	April 21, 1998	Socorro	LINEAR	HYG	7.2 km	MPC · JPL
58854	1998 HV_{87}	—	April 21, 1998	Socorro	LINEAR	·	5.6 km	MPC · JPL
58855	1998 HR_{92}	—	April 21, 1998	Socorro	LINEAR	·	3.0 km	MPC · JPL
58856	1998 HK_{93}	—	April 21, 1998	Socorro	LINEAR	·	1.4 km	MPC · JPL
58857	1998 HP_{94}	—	April 21, 1998	Socorro	LINEAR	·	6.1 km	MPC · JPL
58858	1998 HU_{97}	—	April 21, 1998	Socorro	LINEAR	·	8.7 km	MPC · JPL
58859	1998 HD_{98}	—	April 21, 1998	Socorro	LINEAR	EOS	7.8 km	MPC · JPL
58860	1998 HU_{99}	—	April 21, 1998	Socorro	LINEAR	EOS	3.7 km	MPC · JPL
58861	1998 HV_{99}	—	April 21, 1998	Socorro	LINEAR	·	6.6 km	MPC · JPL
58862	1998 HR_{101}	—	April 28, 1998	Socorro	LINEAR	·	9.5 km	MPC · JPL
58863	1998 HA_{102}	—	April 25, 1998	La Silla	E. W. Elst	·	8.9 km	MPC · JPL
58864	1998 HC_{109}	—	April 23, 1998	Socorro	LINEAR	·	5.4 km	MPC · JPL
58865	1998 HX_{109}	—	April 23, 1998	Socorro	LINEAR	·	9.3 km	MPC · JPL
58866	1998 HP_{110}	—	April 23, 1998	Socorro	LINEAR	·	4.5 km	MPC · JPL
58867	1998 HV_{110}	—	April 23, 1998	Socorro	LINEAR	·	4.6 km	MPC · JPL
58868	1998 HK_{112}	—	April 23, 1998	Socorro	LINEAR	·	6.3 km	MPC · JPL
58869	1998 HA_{113}	—	April 23, 1998	Socorro	LINEAR	·	2.2 km	MPC · JPL
58870	1998 HR_{113}	—	April 23, 1998	Socorro	LINEAR	·	6.8 km	MPC · JPL
58871	1998 HX_{114}	—	April 23, 1998	Socorro	LINEAR	·	2.3 km	MPC · JPL
58872	1998 HY_{117}	—	April 23, 1998	Socorro	LINEAR	·	5.1 km	MPC · JPL
58873	1998 HK_{118}	—	April 23, 1998	Socorro	LINEAR	·	8.5 km	MPC · JPL
58874	1998 HH_{119}	—	April 23, 1998	Socorro	LINEAR	·	8.5 km	MPC · JPL
58875	1998 HS_{119}	—	April 23, 1998	Socorro	LINEAR	·	4.7 km	MPC · JPL
58876	1998 HT_{121}	—	April 23, 1998	Socorro	LINEAR	EOS	4.5 km	MPC · JPL
58877	1998 HM_{124}	—	April 23, 1998	Socorro	LINEAR	·	14 km	MPC · JPL
58878	1998 HK_{125}	—	April 23, 1998	Socorro	LINEAR	·	6.0 km	MPC · JPL
58879	1998 HO_{126}	—	April 28, 1998	Socorro	LINEAR	·	18 km	MPC · JPL
58880	1998 HA_{130}	—	April 19, 1998	Socorro	LINEAR	·	4.8 km	MPC · JPL
58881	1998 HZ_{132}	—	April 19, 1998	Socorro	LINEAR	·	3.5 km	MPC · JPL
58882	1998 HF_{134}	—	April 19, 1998	Socorro	LINEAR	·	8.7 km	MPC · JPL
58883	1998 HH_{137}	—	April 20, 1998	Socorro	LINEAR	DOR	5.0 km	MPC · JPL
58884	1998 HD_{139}	—	April 21, 1998	Socorro	LINEAR	PHO	2.9 km	MPC · JPL
58885	1998 HA_{142}	—	April 21, 1998	Socorro	LINEAR	fast	1.5 km	MPC · JPL
58886	1998 HN_{143}	—	April 21, 1998	Socorro	LINEAR	·	5.3 km	MPC · JPL
58887	1998 HD_{144}	—	April 21, 1998	Socorro	LINEAR	·	7.4 km	MPC · JPL
58888	1998 HE_{144}	—	April 21, 1998	Socorro	LINEAR	·	2.4 km	MPC · JPL
58889	1998 HW_{144}	—	April 21, 1998	Socorro	LINEAR	·	1.4 km	MPC · JPL
58890	1998 HS_{145}	—	April 21, 1998	Socorro	LINEAR	TEL	4.0 km	MPC · JPL
58891	1998 HT_{145}	—	April 21, 1998	Socorro	LINEAR	·	2.8 km	MPC · JPL
58892	1998 HP_{148}	—	April 25, 1998	La Silla	E. W. Elst	(58892)	8.0 km	MPC · JPL
58893	1998 HQ_{153}	—	April 24, 1998	Haleakala	NEAT	AEG	6.2 km	MPC · JPL
58894	1998 HK_{155}	—	April 20, 1998	Socorro	LINEAR	(5)	3.0 km	MPC · JPL
58895 Annierobin	1998 JS_{3}	Annierobin	May 6, 1998	Caussols	ODAS	HYG	6.4 km	MPC · JPL
58896 Schlosser	1998 JE_{4}	Schlosser	May 15, 1998	Starkenburg Observatory	Starkenburg	·	5.7 km	MPC · JPL
58897	1998 KZ	—	May 22, 1998	Socorro	LINEAR	H	1.7 km	MPC · JPL
58898	1998 KH_{4}	—	May 22, 1998	Anderson Mesa	LONEOS	·	7.2 km	MPC · JPL
58899	1998 KD_{7}	—	May 22, 1998	Anderson Mesa	LONEOS	·	9.9 km	MPC · JPL
58900	1998 KM_{7}	—	May 23, 1998	Anderson Mesa	LONEOS	·	5.0 km	MPC · JPL

== 58901–59000 ==
back to top

Designation			Discovery			Properties		Ref
Permanent	Provisional	Named after	Date	Site	Discoverer(s)	Category	Diam.	Ref
58901	1998 KX_{8}	—	May 23, 1998	Anderson Mesa	LONEOS	·	6.3 km	MPC · JPL
58902	1998 KC_{9}	—	May 27, 1998	Anderson Mesa	LONEOS	TIR	7.7 km	MPC · JPL
58903	1998 KC_{10}	—	May 25, 1998	Xinglong	SCAP	·	1.7 km	MPC · JPL
58904	1998 KV_{10}	—	May 22, 1998	Kitt Peak	Spacewatch	EOS	4.0 km	MPC · JPL
58905	1998 KE_{11}	—	May 23, 1998	Kitt Peak	Spacewatch	·	3.8 km	MPC · JPL
58906	1998 KN_{18}	—	May 22, 1998	Socorro	LINEAR	·	11 km	MPC · JPL
58907	1998 KM_{22}	—	May 22, 1998	Socorro	LINEAR	·	5.4 km	MPC · JPL
58908	1998 KM_{29}	—	May 22, 1998	Socorro	LINEAR	·	9.4 km	MPC · JPL
58909	1998 KP_{30}	—	May 22, 1998	Socorro	LINEAR	·	10 km	MPC · JPL
58910	1998 KE_{32}	—	May 22, 1998	Socorro	LINEAR	·	2.5 km	MPC · JPL
58911	1998 KO_{33}	—	May 22, 1998	Socorro	LINEAR	(5)	2.5 km	MPC · JPL
58912	1998 KN_{34}	—	May 22, 1998	Socorro	LINEAR	·	6.8 km	MPC · JPL
58913	1998 KY_{34}	—	May 22, 1998	Socorro	LINEAR	AGN ·	5.2 km	MPC · JPL
58914	1998 KE_{41}	—	May 22, 1998	Socorro	LINEAR	·	6.8 km	MPC · JPL
58915	1998 KA_{50}	—	May 23, 1998	Socorro	LINEAR	·	6.9 km	MPC · JPL
58916	1998 KM_{50}	—	May 23, 1998	Socorro	LINEAR	·	6.2 km	MPC · JPL
58917	1998 KP_{53}	—	May 23, 1998	Socorro	LINEAR	LIX	8.3 km	MPC · JPL
58918	1998 KB_{54}	—	May 23, 1998	Socorro	LINEAR	·	2.3 km	MPC · JPL
58919	1998 KF_{55}	—	May 23, 1998	Socorro	LINEAR	TIR	3.4 km	MPC · JPL
58920	1998 KJ_{56}	—	May 27, 1998	Socorro	LINEAR	H	1.4 km	MPC · JPL
58921	1998 KH_{58}	—	May 21, 1998	Reedy Creek	J. Broughton	TIR	3.9 km	MPC · JPL
58922	1998 KK_{58}	—	May 22, 1998	Reedy Creek	J. Broughton	·	3.9 km	MPC · JPL
58923	1998 KJ_{62}	—	May 22, 1998	Socorro	LINEAR	·	6.9 km	MPC · JPL
58924	1998 KF_{67}	—	May 23, 1998	Socorro	LINEAR	·	5.5 km	MPC · JPL
58925	1998 LZ_{2}	—	June 1, 1998	La Silla	E. W. Elst	·	10 km	MPC · JPL
58926	1998 MO_{1}	—	June 16, 1998	Kitt Peak	Spacewatch	MRX	2.0 km	MPC · JPL
58927	1998 MB_{10}	—	June 19, 1998	Socorro	LINEAR	·	1.9 km	MPC · JPL
58928	1998 MP_{18}	—	June 26, 1998	Kitt Peak	Spacewatch	THM	5.6 km	MPC · JPL
58929	1998 MU_{30}	—	June 27, 1998	Kitt Peak	Spacewatch	·	12 km	MPC · JPL
58930	1998 MK_{31}	—	June 24, 1998	Socorro	LINEAR	·	4.7 km	MPC · JPL
58931 Palmys	1998 MK_{47}	Palmys	June 28, 1998	La Silla	E. W. Elst	L5	28 km	MPC · JPL
58932	1998 OF_{7}	—	July 28, 1998	Xinglong	SCAP	·	2.1 km	MPC · JPL
58933	1998 ON_{10}	—	July 26, 1998	La Silla	E. W. Elst	·	2.0 km	MPC · JPL
58934	1998 OK_{13}	—	July 26, 1998	La Silla	E. W. Elst	·	2.2 km	MPC · JPL
58935	1998 ON_{14}	—	July 26, 1998	La Silla	E. W. Elst	NYS	3.7 km	MPC · JPL
58936	1998 PJ_{1}	—	August 13, 1998	Woomera	F. B. Zoltowski	·	2.1 km	MPC · JPL
58937	1998 QL_{6}	—	August 24, 1998	Caussols	ODAS	·	3.3 km	MPC · JPL
58938	1998 QJ_{18}	—	August 17, 1998	Socorro	LINEAR	JUN	2.3 km	MPC · JPL
58939	1998 QY_{20}	—	August 17, 1998	Socorro	LINEAR	·	2.3 km	MPC · JPL
58940	1998 QP_{21}	—	August 17, 1998	Socorro	LINEAR	·	2.7 km	MPC · JPL
58941 Guishida	1998 QK_{29}	Guishida	August 22, 1998	Xinglong	SCAP	·	2.7 km	MPC · JPL
58942	1998 QH_{33}	—	August 17, 1998	Socorro	LINEAR	·	2.3 km	MPC · JPL
58943	1998 QF_{37}	—	August 17, 1998	Socorro	LINEAR	·	2.7 km	MPC · JPL
58944	1998 QO_{41}	—	August 17, 1998	Socorro	LINEAR	·	1.9 km	MPC · JPL
58945	1998 QY_{43}	—	August 17, 1998	Socorro	LINEAR	·	2.2 km	MPC · JPL
58946	1998 QY_{51}	—	August 17, 1998	Socorro	LINEAR	·	3.0 km	MPC · JPL
58947	1998 QX_{52}	—	August 20, 1998	Anderson Mesa	LONEOS	·	3.2 km	MPC · JPL
58948	1998 QT_{54}	—	August 27, 1998	Anderson Mesa	LONEOS	·	6.0 km	MPC · JPL
58949	1998 QK_{63}	—	August 30, 1998	Bergisch Gladbach	W. Bickel	·	2.7 km	MPC · JPL
58950	1998 QE_{69}	—	August 24, 1998	Socorro	LINEAR	·	2.3 km	MPC · JPL
58951	1998 QD_{72}	—	August 24, 1998	Socorro	LINEAR	·	8.0 km	MPC · JPL
58952	1998 QO_{74}	—	August 24, 1998	Socorro	LINEAR	·	5.8 km	MPC · JPL
58953	1998 QC_{75}	—	August 24, 1998	Socorro	LINEAR	CYB	9.5 km	MPC · JPL
58954	1998 QE_{76}	—	August 24, 1998	Socorro	LINEAR	·	5.5 km	MPC · JPL
58955	1998 QG_{78}	—	August 24, 1998	Socorro	LINEAR	·	2.0 km	MPC · JPL
58956	1998 QG_{90}	—	August 24, 1998	Socorro	LINEAR	TIR	9.6 km	MPC · JPL
58957	1998 QE_{91}	—	August 28, 1998	Socorro	LINEAR	·	5.5 km	MPC · JPL
58958	1998 QL_{97}	—	August 24, 1998	Socorro	LINEAR	H	1.1 km	MPC · JPL
58959	1998 QD_{98}	—	August 28, 1998	Socorro	LINEAR	·	2.5 km	MPC · JPL
58960	1998 QH_{99}	—	August 26, 1998	La Silla	E. W. Elst	NYS	2.9 km	MPC · JPL
58961	1998 QG_{100}	—	August 26, 1998	La Silla	E. W. Elst	·	1.9 km	MPC · JPL
58962	1998 QJ_{100}	—	August 26, 1998	La Silla	E. W. Elst	V	2.0 km	MPC · JPL
58963	1998 QR_{100}	—	August 26, 1998	La Silla	E. W. Elst	·	3.8 km	MPC · JPL
58964	1998 QJ_{104}	—	August 26, 1998	La Silla	E. W. Elst	·	7.2 km	MPC · JPL
58965 Juliettegréco	1998 RO_{2}	Juliettegréco	September 15, 1998	Caussols	ODAS	·	6.5 km	MPC · JPL
58966	1998 RW_{3}	—	September 14, 1998	Socorro	LINEAR	·	3.4 km	MPC · JPL
58967	1998 RR_{5}	—	September 15, 1998	Anderson Mesa	LONEOS	·	1.9 km	MPC · JPL
58968	1998 RJ_{6}	—	September 14, 1998	Anderson Mesa	LONEOS	·	2.5 km	MPC · JPL
58969	1998 RO_{6}	—	September 15, 1998	Anderson Mesa	LONEOS	·	3.8 km	MPC · JPL
58970	1998 RZ_{8}	—	September 13, 1998	Kitt Peak	Spacewatch	·	4.5 km	MPC · JPL
58971	1998 RE_{11}	—	September 13, 1998	Kitt Peak	Spacewatch	·	1.6 km	MPC · JPL
58972	1998 RO_{16}	—	September 14, 1998	Socorro	LINEAR	·	6.1 km	MPC · JPL
58973	1998 RX_{16}	—	September 14, 1998	Socorro	LINEAR	·	2.3 km	MPC · JPL
58974	1998 RP_{22}	—	September 14, 1998	Socorro	LINEAR	MAS	1.6 km	MPC · JPL
58975	1998 RD_{31}	—	September 14, 1998	Socorro	LINEAR	·	5.4 km	MPC · JPL
58976	1998 RD_{34}	—	September 14, 1998	Socorro	LINEAR	·	2.6 km	MPC · JPL
58977	1998 RK_{38}	—	September 14, 1998	Socorro	LINEAR	EMA	8.2 km	MPC · JPL
58978	1998 RG_{40}	—	September 14, 1998	Socorro	LINEAR	·	4.7 km	MPC · JPL
58979	1998 RE_{46}	—	September 14, 1998	Socorro	LINEAR	·	3.0 km	MPC · JPL
58980	1998 RG_{47}	—	September 14, 1998	Socorro	LINEAR	·	2.2 km	MPC · JPL
58981	1998 RZ_{56}	—	September 14, 1998	Socorro	LINEAR	·	2.4 km	MPC · JPL
58982	1998 RF_{63}	—	September 14, 1998	Socorro	LINEAR	·	2.2 km	MPC · JPL
58983	1998 RF_{66}	—	September 14, 1998	Socorro	LINEAR	·	2.5 km	MPC · JPL
58984	1998 RU_{69}	—	September 14, 1998	Socorro	LINEAR	·	4.2 km	MPC · JPL
58985	1998 RL_{72}	—	September 14, 1998	Socorro	LINEAR	·	1.9 km	MPC · JPL
58986	1998 RO_{72}	—	September 14, 1998	Socorro	LINEAR	NYS	2.4 km	MPC · JPL
58987	1998 RU_{74}	—	September 14, 1998	Socorro	LINEAR	·	1.9 km	MPC · JPL
58988	1998 RD_{75}	—	September 14, 1998	Socorro	LINEAR	HYG	7.7 km	MPC · JPL
58989	1998 RN_{80}	—	September 14, 1998	Socorro	LINEAR	V	1.6 km	MPC · JPL
58990	1998 SA_{2}	—	September 17, 1998	Caussols	ODAS	·	4.7 km	MPC · JPL
58991	1998 SJ_{4}	—	September 19, 1998	Needville	Dillon, W. G.	·	2.9 km	MPC · JPL
58992	1998 SH_{8}	—	September 20, 1998	Kitt Peak	Spacewatch	·	1.8 km	MPC · JPL
58993	1998 SF_{9}	—	September 17, 1998	Xinglong	SCAP	·	6.7 km	MPC · JPL
58994	1998 SY_{9}	—	September 18, 1998	Višnjan Observatory	Višnjan	NYS	1.4 km	MPC · JPL
58995	1998 SY_{16}	—	September 17, 1998	Kitt Peak	Spacewatch	·	2.8 km	MPC · JPL
58996	1998 SM_{17}	—	September 17, 1998	Kitt Peak	Spacewatch	·	4.5 km	MPC · JPL
58997	1998 SG_{20}	—	September 20, 1998	Kitt Peak	Spacewatch	·	3.3 km	MPC · JPL
58998	1998 SK_{21}	—	September 21, 1998	Kitt Peak	Spacewatch	·	4.7 km	MPC · JPL
58999	1998 SP_{23}	—	September 17, 1998	Anderson Mesa	LONEOS	·	3.4 km	MPC · JPL
59000 Beiguan	1998 SW_{26}	Beiguan	September 17, 1998	Xinglong	SCAP	·	2.9 km	MPC · JPL

back to top

== See also ==
- Meanings of minor-planet names: 58001–59000
