= Meanings of minor-planet names: 58001–59000 =

As minor planet discoveries are confirmed, they are given a permanent number by the IAU's Minor Planet Center (MPC), and the discoverers can then submit names for them, following the IAU's naming conventions. The list below concerns those minor planets in the specified number-range that have received names, and explains the meanings of those names.

Official naming citations of newly named small Solar System bodies are approved and published in a bulletin by IAU's Working Group for Small Bodies Nomenclature (WGSBN). Before May 2021, citations were published in MPC's Minor Planet Circulars for many decades. Recent citations can also be found on the JPL Small-Body Database (SBDB). Until his death in 2016, German astronomer Lutz D. Schmadel compiled these citations into the Dictionary of Minor Planet Names (DMP) and regularly updated the collection.

Based on Paul Herget's The Names of the Minor Planets, Schmadel also researched the unclear origin of numerous asteroids, most of which had been named prior to World War II. This article incorporates text from this source, which is in the public domain: SBDB New namings may only be added to this list below after official publication as the preannouncement of names is condemned. The WGSBN publishes a comprehensive guideline for the naming rules of non-cometary small Solar System bodies.

== 58001–58100 ==
Named minor planet	Provisional	This minor planet was named for...	Ref · Catalog
58084 Hiketaon	1197 T-3	Hiketaon, one of the elders of Troy, counselors to Priam; the son of Laomedon, he suggested Helen be returned to Menelaus to avoid the Trojan war	JPL · 58084
58095 Oranienstein	1973 SN	Oranienstein, a baroque castle on the Lahn river near Diez, Germany	JPL · 58095
58096 Oineus	1973 SC_{2}	Oeneus, king of Calydonia, son of Porthaon, who sent Meleager out to find heroes to kill the Calydonian Boar; his grandson Diomedes avoided fighting Glaukos because of the friendship between Oeneus and Glaukos' grandfather Bellerophon	JPL · 58096
58097 Alimov	1976 UQ_{1}	Alexandr Fyodorovich Alimov, Russian founder of the school of functional ecology and president of the Hydrobiological Society	JPL · 58097
58098 Quirrenbach	1977 TC	Andreas Quirrenbach, German astronomer, director of the Landessternwarte Heidelberg-Königstuhl (Königstuhl Observatory) since 2006	JPL · 58098

== 58101–58200 ==
back to top

Named minor planet	Provisional	This minor planet was named for...	Ref · Catalog
58145 Gus	1986 PT_{1}	Augustin J. “Gus” Rudnyk (1927–2011), the discoverer’s father.	IAU · 58145
58152 Natsöderblom	1988 PF_{2}	Nathan Söderblom (Lars Olof Jonathan Söderblom), Swedish archbishop, theologian and Peace Nobelist	JPL · 58152
58163 Minnesang	1989 UJ_{7}	Minnesang, German sung poetry of the 12th and 13th centuries	JPL · 58163
58164 Reiwanohoshi	1989 WV_{3}	Following the April 2019 abdication of Japan's Heisei Emperor, the new Reiwa Era began. As "Reiwa" means peace and harmony, "Reiwanohoshi" ("the star of Reiwa") is named to symbolize Japan going into a new peaceful era, free of natural disasters.	IAU · 58164
58184 Masayukiyamamoto	1991 RG_{1}	Masayuki Yamamoto (born 1971), a Japanese planetary scientist.	JPL · 58184
58185 Rokkosan	1991 RH_{1}	Rokkosan is a 1000-meter-high mountain behind the city of Kobe, Japan	JPL · 58185
58186 Langkavel	1991 RT_{4}	Arno Langkavel (born 1938), a former high school teacher and historian of astronomy.	JPL · 58186
58191 Dolomiten	1991 YN_{1}	The Dolomites mountains (Dolomiten is the Swiss-German name)	JPL · 58191
58196 Ashleyess	1992 EC_{1}	Ashley Caroline Steel, the discoverer's youngest sister	JPL · 58196

== 58201–58300 ==
back to top

Named minor planet	Provisional	This minor planet was named for...	Ref · Catalog
58214 Amorim	1992 RA_{2}	Regina Helena Caldas de Amorim, Brazilian neuro-pediatrician at Belo Horizonte (Minas Gerais)	JPL · 58214
58215 von Klitzing	1992 SY_{1}	Klaus von Klitzing, German physicist and Nobelist	JPL · 58215
58217 Peterhebel	1992 SP_{16}	Peter Hebel (born 1957) is a most interested amateur astronomer, but as a doctor of medicine his chief occupation is that of an operating surgeon at the Medical University of Graz, Austria, where he has saved and improved the life of many patients.	JPL · 58217
58221 Boston	1993 BM_{14}	Boston, founded in 1630 by Puritan settlers from England, is the capital and largest city of the American state of Massachusetts.	JPL · 58221
58279 Kamerlingh	1993 TE_{40}	Heike Kamerlingh Onnes, 19th–20th-century Dutch physicist, who first liquefied helium	JPL · 58279

== 58301–58400 ==
back to top

Named minor planet	Provisional	This minor planet was named for...	Ref · Catalog
58345 Moomintroll	1995 CZ_{1}	Moomintroll is the central character of the classic 1946 novel Comet in Moominland (Swedish title Kometjakten) by Finnish author Tove Jansson	JPL · 58345
58364 Feierberg	1995 MF_{7}	Michael Feierberg, American astronomer, who was involved in the early work connecting C-class minor planets to carbonaceous chondrites	JPL · 58364
58365 Robmedrano	1995 OQ	Technical Sergeant Rob Medrano, of the Air Force Maui Optical and Supercomputing (AMOS) observatory	JPL · 58365
58373 Albertoalonso	1995 SR	Alberto Alonso, the legendary Cuban choreographer and dance visionary	JPL · 58373

== 58401–58500 ==
back to top

Named minor planet	Provisional	This minor planet was named for...	Ref · Catalog
58417 Belzoni	1996 BD_{2}	Giovanni Battista Belzoni, an explorer of Egyptian antiquities.	JPL · 58417
58418 Luguhu	1996 BA_{4}	Luguhu Lake is situated at the junction of southwestern Sichuan and northwestern Yunnan	JPL · 58418
58424 Jamesdunlop	1996 DL_{1}	James Dunlop, Scottish-Australian astronomer	JPL · 58424
58440 Zdeněkstuchlík	1996 HV	Zdeněk Stuchlík (born 1950) is a Czech theoretical physicist and astrophysicist, fine art photographer and professor at the Silesian University in Opava. His field of research is relativistic astrophysics and cosmology, in particular with focus on compact objects like black holes and neutron stars.	JPL · 58440
58441 Thomastestoni	1996 HO_{1}	Thomas Testoni (born 1984) is a tourist services technician and a computer store manager. He is the son-in-law of one of the co-discoverers of this minor planet.	IAU · 58441
58460 Le Mouélic	1996 LM_{1}	Stéphane Le Mouélic, a research engineer at the University of Nantes.	JPL · 58460
58466 Santoka	1996 OB_{1}	Santoka Taneda, the Japanese "Wandering Haiku Poet"	JPL · 58466
58495 Hajin	1996 US_{1}	Ha Jin is the pen name of Xuefei Jin (born 1956), a Chinese-American writer, poet and essayist. His 1999 novel Waiting received the National Book Award for Fiction and the PEN/Faulkner Award. He currently teaches at Boston University (MA).	IAU · 58495
58498 Octaviopaz	1996 VF	Octavio Paz Lozano (1914–1998) was a Mexican poet and essayist, who won the Nobel Prize for Literature in 1990.	JPL · 58498
58499 Stüber	1996 VY	Eberhard Stüber, Austrian director of the natural science museum "Haus der Natur" in Salzburg	JPL · 58499

== 58501–58600 ==
back to top

Named minor planet	Provisional	This minor planet was named for...	Ref · Catalog
58534 Logos	1997 CQ_{29}	Logos and Zoe ((58534) Logos I Zoe), a paired emanation of the deity in the Gnostic tradition, and part of its creation myth	JPL · 58534
58535 Pattillo	1997 DP	Leonard Pattillo, American founding member and former officer of the Fort Bend Astronomy Club	JPL · 58535
58569 Eboshiyamakouen	1997 QY_{2}	Eboshiyama Kouen, the name of the park in the southern part of Nanyo city, Yamagata.	JPL · 58569
58571 Barbaraserf	1997 RB_{5}	Barbara, an iconic French singer-songwrite	IAU · 58571
58572 Romanella	1997 RV_{6}	Russell Romanella (born 1958) is an experienced space engineer involved in human space exploration activities such as the Space Shuttle, International Space Station and Constellation projects	JPL · 58572
58573 Serpieri	1997 RD_{7}	Arrigo Serpieri, Italian agricultural economist	JPL · 58573
58578 Žídek	1997 SP_{2}	Ivo Žídek, Czech opera singer †	MPC · 58578
58579 Ehrenberg	1997 SQ_{2}	Eleonora Gayerová z Ehrenberku (Eleonora Gayerová of Ehrenberg), Czech soprano opera singer, who lived in Vila Leonora at Ondřejov and was instrumental in the establishment of the Ondřejov Observatory † ‡	MPC · 58579
58580 Elenacuoghi	1997 SW_{2}	Elena Cuoghi (born 1990) is a European Languages and Cultures graduate of the University of Modena. She is the daughter-in-law of the discoverer of this minor planet.	IAU · 58580
58595 Joepollock	1997 TX_{9}	Joseph T. Pollock (born 1950), a professor of astronomy at the Appalachian State University, Boone, North Carolina.	JPL · 58595
58600 Iwamuroonsen	1997 TC_{17}	Iwamuroonsen is a town of the southwest of Niigata City JPL	MPC · 58600

== 58601–58700 ==
back to top

Named minor planet	Provisional	This minor planet was named for...	Ref · Catalog
58605 Liutungsheng	1997 TA_{27}	Liu Tungsheng, Chinese Earth scientist and academician of the Chinese Academy of Sciences	JPL · 58605
58606 Charlestrenet	1997 TF_{27}	Charles Trenet, French singer-songwriter and composer, renowned as one of the greatest interpreters of French chanson.	IAU · 58606
58607 Wenzel	1997 UL	Wolfgang Wenzel, German astronomer †	MPC · 58607
58608 Geroldrichter	1997 UY	Gerold A. Richter, German astronomer †	MPC · 58608
58622 Setoguchi	1997 VU	Takashi Setoguchi (born 1961) is a member of the Oriental Astronomical Association.	JPL · 58622
58627 Rieko	1997 VG_{5}	Rieko is married to the discoverer.	JPL · 58627
58664 IYAMMIX	1997 YA_{1}	The International Year of Astronomy (IYA 2009) is a global effort initiated by the IAU and UNESCO to stimulate worldwide interest in astronomy under the central theme "The Universe, Yours to Discover"	JPL · 58664
58671 Diplodocus	1997 YC_{8}	one of the largest animals ever to walk on the earth, the Dashing Diplodocus is the premier quarterly publication of the Houston Museum of Natural Science.	JPL · 58671
58672 Remigio	1997 YT_{8}	Scarfi Remigio, Italian geologist, mathematics teacher, and amateur astronomer	JPL · 58672
58679 Brenig	1998 AH	Brenig, a part of Bornheim, is located near the Rhine river between Cologne and Bonn.	JPL · 58679
58682 Alenašolcová	1998 AA_{11}	Alena Šolcová, Czech mathematician and historian of mathematics and astronomy	JPL · 58682
58683 Jeanmouette	1998 AJ_{10}	Jean Mouette (b. 1958), French engineer.	IAU · 58683
58691 Luigisannino	1998 BG_{14}	Luigi Sannino (born 1981) is an Italian amateur astronomer, studying comets and asteroids.	IAU · 58691
58700 Darson	1998 BQ_{42}	David Darson, French research engineer at the École Normale Supérieure in Paris.	IAU · 58700

== 58701–58800 ==
back to top

Named minor planet	Provisional	This minor planet was named for...	Ref · Catalog
58702 Tizianabitossi	1998 BX_{43}	Tiziana Bitossi (b. 1970) has been an amateur astronomer at the Gruppo Astrofili Montelupo since 2017.	7 · 58702
58707 Kyoshi	1998 CS	Kyoshi Takahama, Japanese Haiku poet and novelist	JPL · 58707
58709 Zenocolò	1998 CT_{2}	Zeno Colò, 20th-century Italian skier and Olympic gold medalist (Oslo Winter Games, 1952)	JPL · 58709
58714 Boya	1998 DS_{2}	Bo Ya, in Chinese, signifies brilliance and magnanimity, and exemplifies the intellectual traditions and spirit of Peking University throughout its 125 years of history.	IAU · 58714
58734 Jeantarde	1998 EP	Jean Tarde, French ecclesiastic and astronomer born in La Roque Gageac.	IAU · 58734
58736 Karlantier	1998 EO_{6}	Karl Antier, French expert in meteor and meteorite science.	IAU · 58736
58750 Simonjeanne	1998 FY_{10}	Simon Jeanne, French astronomer.	IAU · 58750
58756 Malgoyre	1998 EO_{6}	Adrien Malgoyre, French project manager for the international FRIPON fireball network.	IAU · 58756
58782 Suhelahmeti	1998 FY_{72}	Suhel Ahmeti, Kosovar astronomer and founder of the Astronomy Club of Kosovo.	IAU · 58782

== 58801–58900 ==
back to top

Named minor planet	Provisional	This minor planet was named for...	Ref · Catalog
58895 Annierobin	1998 JS_{3}	Annie Robin, French astrophysicist	IAU · 58895
58896 Schlosser	1998 JE_{4}	Wolfhard Schlosser, professor at Bochum University from 1969 until his retirement in 2005	JPL · 58896

== 58901–59000 ==
back to top

Named minor planet	Provisional	This minor planet was named for...	Ref · Catalog
58931 Palmys	1998 MK_{47}	Palmys, a Trojan fighting for the relief of the city of Troy set off for the centre of the battlefield, with a group of other Trojans from Ascania.	JPL · 58931
58941 Guishida	1998 QK_{29}	Guishida (Guizhou Normal University, GZNU), a university in Guizhou province, China	IAU · 58941
58965 Juliettegréco	1998 RO_{2}	Juliette Gréco, French singer and actress.	IAU · 58965
59000 Beiguan	1998 SW_{26}	Beijing Planetarium (Beijing Tianwenguan), on the occasion of its fiftieth anniversary year (2007)	JPL · 59000

back to top

Preceded by 57,001–58,000	Meanings of minor-planet names List of minor planets: 58,001–59,000	Succeeded by 59,001–60,000
