= Caussols =

Commune in Provence-Alpes-Côte d'Azur, France

- Commune
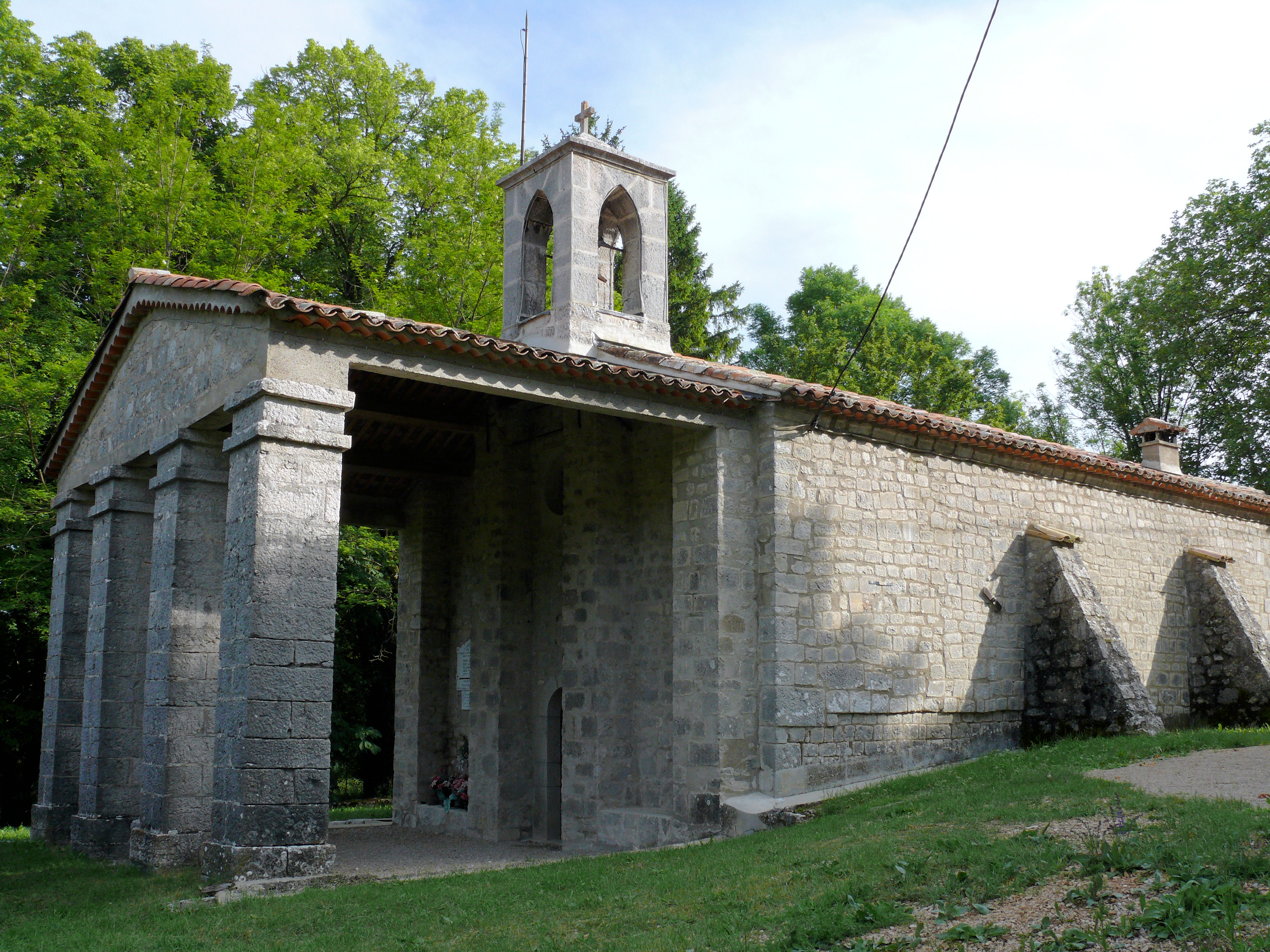
- The church of Saint-Lambert, in Caussols

- Coat of arms
- Location of Caussols
- Location within France Location within Provence-Alpes-Côte d'Azur
- Coordinates: 43°44′33″N 6°54′01″E
- Country: France
- Region: Provence-Alpes-Côte d'Azur
- Department: Alpes-Maritimes
- Arrondissement: Grasse
- Canton: Valbonne
- Intercommunality: CA Sophia Antipolis

Government
  - Mayor (2026–32): Virginie Archen
- Area^{1}: 27.39 km^{2} (10.58 sq mi)
- Elevation: 1,200 m (3,900 ft)
- Highest elevation: 1,458 m (4,783 ft)
- Lowest elevation: 895 m (2,936 ft)
- Population (2023): 332
  - Density: 12.1/km^{2} (31.4/sq mi)
- Time zone: UTC+01:00 (CET)
  - Summer (DST): UTC+02:00 (CEST)
- INSEE/Postal code: 06037 /06460
- ^{1} French Land Register data, which excludes lakes, ponds, glaciers > 1 km^{2} (0.386 sq mi or 247 acres) and river estuaries.

Caussols (French pronunciation: [kosɔl]; Occitan: Caussòus; Italian: Caussole) is a commune in the Alpes-Maritimes department in southeastern France. It is known for the CERGA Observatory on the Calern plateau.

== Demographics ==
Historical population
Year	Pop.	±% p.a.
1968	60	—
1975	61	+0.24%
1982	99	+7.16%
1990	117	+2.11%
1999	150	+2.80%
2007	229	+5.43%
2012	253	+2.01%
2017	287	+2.55%
2023	332	+2.46%
Source: INSEE

== See also ==
- Communes of the Alpes-Maritimes department
