= List of minor planets: 401001–402000 =

The following is a partial list of minor planets, running from minor-planet number 401001 through 402000, inclusive. The primary data for this and other partial lists is based on JPL's "Small-Body Orbital Elements" and data available from the Minor Planet Center. Critical list information is also provided by the MPC, unless otherwise specified from Lowell Observatory. A detailed description of the table's columns and additional sources are given on the main page including a complete list of every page in this series, and a statistical break-up on the dynamical classification of minor planets.

Also see the summary list of all named bodies in numerical and alphabetical order, and the corresponding naming citations for the number range of this particular list. New namings may only be added to this list after official publication, as the preannouncement of names is condemned by the Working Group for Small Bodies Nomenclature of the International Astronomical Union.

| Near-Earth obj. | MBA (inner) | MBA (outer) | Centaur |
| Mars-crosser | MBA (middle) | Jupiter trojan | Trans-Neptunian obj. |
| Unclassified |

== 401001–401100 ==
| Designation | | | Discovery | | | Properties | | Ref |
| Permanent | Provisional | Named after | Date | Site | Discoverer(s) | Category | Diam. | Ref |
|---|---|---|---|---|---|---|---|---|
| 401001 | 2011 QO_{17} | — | January 31, 2006 | Kitt Peak | Spacewatch | · | 840 m | MPC · JPL |
| 401002 | 2011 QC_{31} | — | August 19, 2001 | Socorro | LINEAR | · | 710 m | MPC · JPL |
| 401003 | 2011 QG_{40} | — | September 10, 2004 | Kitt Peak | Spacewatch | · | 870 m | MPC · JPL |
| 401004 | 2011 QX_{61} | — | August 9, 2004 | Anderson Mesa | LONEOS | · | 690 m | MPC · JPL |
| 401005 | 2011 QG_{88} | — | February 14, 2010 | Mount Lemmon | Mount Lemmon Survey | · | 620 m | MPC · JPL |
| 401006 | 2011 QG_{92} | — | October 4, 2003 | Kitt Peak | Spacewatch | · | 3.3 km | MPC · JPL |
| 401007 | 2011 QX_{92} | — | December 25, 2005 | Kitt Peak | Spacewatch | · | 650 m | MPC · JPL |
| 401008 | 2011 QN_{93} | — | November 29, 2005 | Kitt Peak | Spacewatch | · | 820 m | MPC · JPL |
| 401009 | 2011 RM_{3} | — | September 20, 2001 | Socorro | LINEAR | · | 700 m | MPC · JPL |
| 401010 | 2011 RX_{10} | — | November 17, 2001 | Socorro | LINEAR | · | 610 m | MPC · JPL |
| 401011 | 2011 RP_{13} | — | August 16, 2001 | Socorro | LINEAR | · | 670 m | MPC · JPL |
| 401012 | 2011 RY_{13} | — | September 20, 2001 | Socorro | LINEAR | · | 610 m | MPC · JPL |
| 401013 | 2011 RV_{15} | — | November 18, 2008 | Kitt Peak | Spacewatch | · | 1.3 km | MPC · JPL |
| 401014 | 2011 SV_{4} | — | June 15, 2010 | WISE | WISE | V | 2.6 km | MPC · JPL |
| 401015 | 2011 SB_{9} | — | March 13, 2010 | Kitt Peak | Spacewatch | · | 900 m | MPC · JPL |
| 401016 | 2011 SV_{29} | — | December 30, 2008 | Mount Lemmon | Mount Lemmon Survey | · | 1.1 km | MPC · JPL |
| 401017 | 2011 SE_{32} | — | September 21, 2011 | Mount Lemmon | Mount Lemmon Survey | · | 1.2 km | MPC · JPL |
| 401018 | 2011 SQ_{34} | — | October 23, 2004 | Kitt Peak | Spacewatch | · | 1.2 km | MPC · JPL |
| 401019 | 2011 SC_{35} | — | May 4, 2005 | Kitt Peak | Spacewatch | HOF | 2.3 km | MPC · JPL |
| 401020 | 2011 SZ_{36} | — | September 11, 2007 | Mount Lemmon | Mount Lemmon Survey | V | 610 m | MPC · JPL |
| 401021 | 2011 SF_{40} | — | September 8, 2011 | Kitt Peak | Spacewatch | V | 700 m | MPC · JPL |
| 401022 | 2011 SN_{46} | — | August 25, 2000 | Socorro | LINEAR | · | 1.2 km | MPC · JPL |
| 401023 | 2011 SC_{51} | — | December 31, 2008 | Kitt Peak | Spacewatch | · | 660 m | MPC · JPL |
| 401024 | 2011 SC_{56} | — | April 24, 2003 | Kitt Peak | Spacewatch | NYS | 910 m | MPC · JPL |
| 401025 | 2011 SN_{80} | — | February 2, 2006 | Mount Lemmon | Mount Lemmon Survey | V | 680 m | MPC · JPL |
| 401026 | 2011 SU_{98} | — | March 23, 2003 | Kitt Peak | Spacewatch | (2076) | 720 m | MPC · JPL |
| 401027 | 2011 SG_{102} | — | February 15, 2010 | Kitt Peak | Spacewatch | · | 1.1 km | MPC · JPL |
| 401028 | 2011 SK_{118} | — | May 12, 2010 | Mount Lemmon | Mount Lemmon Survey | · | 840 m | MPC · JPL |
| 401029 | 2011 SB_{126} | — | October 16, 2001 | Kitt Peak | Spacewatch | · | 580 m | MPC · JPL |
| 401030 | 2011 SJ_{127} | — | October 26, 2008 | Mount Lemmon | Mount Lemmon Survey | · | 640 m | MPC · JPL |
| 401031 | 2011 SL_{127} | — | August 10, 2007 | Kitt Peak | Spacewatch | · | 1.2 km | MPC · JPL |
| 401032 | 2011 SR_{135} | — | February 14, 2010 | Mount Lemmon | Mount Lemmon Survey | · | 770 m | MPC · JPL |
| 401033 | 2011 SX_{166} | — | September 17, 2006 | Kitt Peak | Spacewatch | EOS | 2.2 km | MPC · JPL |
| 401034 | 2011 SK_{182} | — | September 26, 2011 | Kitt Peak | Spacewatch | · | 1.6 km | MPC · JPL |
| 401035 | 2011 SL_{185} | — | January 20, 2009 | Mount Lemmon | Mount Lemmon Survey | (2076) | 800 m | MPC · JPL |
| 401036 | 2011 SO_{191} | — | October 15, 2004 | Kitt Peak | Spacewatch | · | 810 m | MPC · JPL |
| 401037 | 2011 ST_{198} | — | January 30, 2006 | Kitt Peak | Spacewatch | · | 990 m | MPC · JPL |
| 401038 | 2011 SH_{208} | — | April 30, 2009 | Kitt Peak | Spacewatch | · | 3.1 km | MPC · JPL |
| 401039 | 2011 ST_{216} | — | February 13, 2004 | Kitt Peak | Spacewatch | · | 1.7 km | MPC · JPL |
| 401040 | 2011 SA_{240} | — | December 27, 2005 | Kitt Peak | Spacewatch | · | 700 m | MPC · JPL |
| 401041 | 2011 SW_{256} | — | October 15, 2004 | Mount Lemmon | Mount Lemmon Survey | V | 680 m | MPC · JPL |
| 401042 | 2011 SJ_{260} | — | September 29, 2011 | Kitt Peak | Spacewatch | HOF | 2.8 km | MPC · JPL |
| 401043 | 2011 SZ_{260} | — | February 27, 2006 | Kitt Peak | Spacewatch | · | 1.3 km | MPC · JPL |
| 401044 | 2011 SH_{269} | — | December 18, 2001 | Socorro | LINEAR | · | 1.0 km | MPC · JPL |
| 401045 | 2011 SC_{273} | — | December 31, 2008 | Kitt Peak | Spacewatch | · | 1.0 km | MPC · JPL |
| 401046 | 2011 TM_{9} | — | September 27, 2008 | Mount Lemmon | Mount Lemmon Survey | · | 550 m | MPC · JPL |
| 401047 | 2011 TH_{13} | — | September 28, 2011 | Catalina | CSS | · | 1.6 km | MPC · JPL |
| 401048 | 2011 UK | — | February 9, 2005 | Mount Lemmon | Mount Lemmon Survey | · | 1.5 km | MPC · JPL |
| 401049 | 2011 UA_{2} | — | April 26, 2003 | Kitt Peak | Spacewatch | · | 1.0 km | MPC · JPL |
| 401050 | 2011 UG_{6} | — | December 3, 2007 | Kitt Peak | Spacewatch | · | 1.6 km | MPC · JPL |
| 401051 | 2011 US_{7} | — | October 18, 2011 | Mount Lemmon | Mount Lemmon Survey | · | 1.7 km | MPC · JPL |
| 401052 | 2011 UN_{16} | — | May 28, 2008 | Mount Lemmon | Mount Lemmon Survey | · | 3.5 km | MPC · JPL |
| 401053 | 2011 UE_{17} | — | November 20, 2004 | Kitt Peak | Spacewatch | V | 720 m | MPC · JPL |
| 401054 | 2011 UG_{17} | — | March 16, 2009 | Kitt Peak | Spacewatch | · | 1.6 km | MPC · JPL |
| 401055 | 2011 UU_{19} | — | October 19, 2011 | Kitt Peak | Spacewatch | · | 2.8 km | MPC · JPL |
| 401056 | 2011 UU_{24} | — | September 10, 2007 | Mount Lemmon | Mount Lemmon Survey | NYS | 1.1 km | MPC · JPL |
| 401057 | 2011 UP_{35} | — | October 19, 2011 | Mount Lemmon | Mount Lemmon Survey | (2076) | 960 m | MPC · JPL |
| 401058 | 2011 UE_{36} | — | December 5, 2007 | Kitt Peak | Spacewatch | · | 1.7 km | MPC · JPL |
| 401059 | 2011 UF_{39} | — | December 5, 2008 | Mount Lemmon | Mount Lemmon Survey | V | 610 m | MPC · JPL |
| 401060 | 2011 UN_{39} | — | March 26, 2009 | Mount Lemmon | Mount Lemmon Survey | T_{j} (2.92) | 4.5 km | MPC · JPL |
| 401061 | 2011 UT_{45} | — | October 1, 2000 | Socorro | LINEAR | · | 1.1 km | MPC · JPL |
| 401062 | 2011 UZ_{45} | — | August 24, 2007 | Kitt Peak | Spacewatch | EUN | 1.2 km | MPC · JPL |
| 401063 | 2011 UP_{46} | — | November 19, 2001 | Socorro | LINEAR | · | 980 m | MPC · JPL |
| 401064 | 2011 UM_{53} | — | October 18, 2011 | Kitt Peak | Spacewatch | · | 1.5 km | MPC · JPL |
| 401065 | 2011 US_{53} | — | May 31, 2006 | Mount Lemmon | Mount Lemmon Survey | · | 1.2 km | MPC · JPL |
| 401066 | 2011 UN_{54} | — | October 7, 2004 | Kitt Peak | Spacewatch | · | 790 m | MPC · JPL |
| 401067 | 2011 UP_{54} | — | May 21, 2010 | WISE | WISE | · | 4.0 km | MPC · JPL |
| 401068 | 2011 UE_{59} | — | August 7, 2004 | Campo Imperatore | CINEOS | · | 820 m | MPC · JPL |
| 401069 | 2011 UK_{59} | — | September 18, 2007 | Mount Lemmon | Mount Lemmon Survey | EUN | 990 m | MPC · JPL |
| 401070 | 2011 UO_{79} | — | March 27, 2009 | Mount Lemmon | Mount Lemmon Survey | NEM | 2.3 km | MPC · JPL |
| 401071 | 2011 UH_{80} | — | October 14, 2001 | Socorro | LINEAR | · | 530 m | MPC · JPL |
| 401072 | 2011 UT_{80} | — | October 4, 2004 | Kitt Peak | Spacewatch | V | 570 m | MPC · JPL |
| 401073 | 2011 UC_{82} | — | November 20, 2006 | Kitt Peak | Spacewatch | · | 2.7 km | MPC · JPL |
| 401074 | 2011 UM_{84} | — | March 31, 2009 | Mount Lemmon | Mount Lemmon Survey | · | 1.4 km | MPC · JPL |
| 401075 | 2011 UV_{86} | — | May 7, 2010 | Mount Lemmon | Mount Lemmon Survey | · | 1.8 km | MPC · JPL |
| 401076 | 2011 UK_{94} | — | April 5, 2010 | Mount Lemmon | Mount Lemmon Survey | · | 820 m | MPC · JPL |
| 401077 | 2011 UM_{101} | — | April 18, 2010 | WISE | WISE | · | 2.5 km | MPC · JPL |
| 401078 | 2011 UD_{102} | — | September 29, 2003 | Kitt Peak | Spacewatch | NYS | 1.1 km | MPC · JPL |
| 401079 | 2011 UY_{102} | — | May 27, 2010 | WISE | WISE | · | 3.0 km | MPC · JPL |
| 401080 | 2011 US_{103} | — | April 13, 2005 | Catalina | CSS | MAR | 1.1 km | MPC · JPL |
| 401081 | 2011 UD_{106} | — | April 11, 2010 | Kitt Peak | Spacewatch | · | 1.0 km | MPC · JPL |
| 401082 | 2011 UT_{116} | — | March 19, 2010 | Kitt Peak | Spacewatch | · | 850 m | MPC · JPL |
| 401083 | 2011 UV_{119} | — | December 24, 2005 | Kitt Peak | Spacewatch | · | 680 m | MPC · JPL |
| 401084 | 2011 UZ_{128} | — | November 11, 2004 | Kitt Peak | Spacewatch | · | 970 m | MPC · JPL |
| 401085 | 2011 UB_{129} | — | October 20, 2011 | Kitt Peak | Spacewatch | · | 2.2 km | MPC · JPL |
| 401086 | 2011 UE_{131} | — | September 27, 2011 | Mount Lemmon | Mount Lemmon Survey | · | 3.7 km | MPC · JPL |
| 401087 | 2011 UV_{132} | — | October 22, 2011 | Kitt Peak | Spacewatch | · | 2.0 km | MPC · JPL |
| 401088 | 2011 UD_{137} | — | October 20, 2011 | Kitt Peak | Spacewatch | · | 1.7 km | MPC · JPL |
| 401089 | 2011 UP_{139} | — | March 2, 2006 | Kitt Peak | Spacewatch | · | 690 m | MPC · JPL |
| 401090 | 2011 UM_{141} | — | January 30, 2006 | Kitt Peak | Spacewatch | · | 870 m | MPC · JPL |
| 401091 | 2011 UW_{152} | — | July 8, 2010 | WISE | WISE | EUP | 4.3 km | MPC · JPL |
| 401092 | 2011 UM_{156} | — | October 24, 2011 | Mount Lemmon | Mount Lemmon Survey | · | 1.7 km | MPC · JPL |
| 401093 | 2011 US_{164} | — | October 8, 2007 | Mount Lemmon | Mount Lemmon Survey | · | 1.4 km | MPC · JPL |
| 401094 | 2011 UT_{170} | — | January 25, 2006 | Kitt Peak | Spacewatch | · | 770 m | MPC · JPL |
| 401095 | 2011 UA_{177} | — | October 1, 2000 | Socorro | LINEAR | · | 960 m | MPC · JPL |
| 401096 | 2011 UK_{182} | — | December 16, 2007 | Mount Lemmon | Mount Lemmon Survey | · | 1.6 km | MPC · JPL |
| 401097 | 2011 UG_{183} | — | December 3, 2004 | Kitt Peak | Spacewatch | · | 970 m | MPC · JPL |
| 401098 | 2011 UO_{189} | — | June 23, 2007 | Kitt Peak | Spacewatch | · | 760 m | MPC · JPL |
| 401099 | 2011 UZ_{189} | — | April 19, 2007 | Mount Lemmon | Mount Lemmon Survey | · | 640 m | MPC · JPL |
| 401100 | 2011 UQ_{190} | — | September 23, 2011 | Kitt Peak | Spacewatch | · | 940 m | MPC · JPL |

== 401101–401200 ==
back to top

| Designation | | | Discovery | | | Properties | | Ref |
| Permanent | Provisional | Named after | Date | Site | Discoverer(s) | Category | Diam. | Ref |
|---|---|---|---|---|---|---|---|---|
| 401101 | 2011 UD_{197} | — | October 21, 2011 | Kitt Peak | Spacewatch | · | 1.3 km | MPC · JPL |
| 401102 | 2011 UQ_{202} | — | December 10, 2004 | Kitt Peak | Spacewatch | · | 1.2 km | MPC · JPL |
| 401103 | 2011 UJ_{209} | — | October 9, 2007 | Kitt Peak | Spacewatch | · | 1.1 km | MPC · JPL |
| 401104 | 2011 UO_{218} | — | September 18, 2007 | Kitt Peak | Spacewatch | · | 1.6 km | MPC · JPL |
| 401105 | 2011 UQ_{218} | — | April 15, 2010 | Mount Lemmon | Mount Lemmon Survey | · | 940 m | MPC · JPL |
| 401106 | 2011 UQ_{242} | — | October 22, 2011 | Kitt Peak | Spacewatch | · | 2.6 km | MPC · JPL |
| 401107 | 2011 UY_{242} | — | September 12, 2010 | Mount Lemmon | Mount Lemmon Survey | · | 2.8 km | MPC · JPL |
| 401108 | 2011 UN_{243} | — | May 5, 2010 | Mount Lemmon | Mount Lemmon Survey | · | 1.0 km | MPC · JPL |
| 401109 | 2011 UE_{245} | — | February 9, 2005 | Mount Lemmon | Mount Lemmon Survey | MAS | 670 m | MPC · JPL |
| 401110 | 2011 UQ_{251} | — | September 30, 2006 | Catalina | CSS | AGN | 1.3 km | MPC · JPL |
| 401111 | 2011 UP_{253} | — | April 18, 2009 | Mount Lemmon | Mount Lemmon Survey | · | 1.6 km | MPC · JPL |
| 401112 | 2011 UQ_{256} | — | October 18, 2011 | Mount Lemmon | Mount Lemmon Survey | · | 2.0 km | MPC · JPL |
| 401113 | 2011 UN_{260} | — | October 13, 2004 | Kitt Peak | Spacewatch | V | 580 m | MPC · JPL |
| 401114 | 2011 UZ_{267} | — | November 18, 2003 | Kitt Peak | Spacewatch | · | 1.0 km | MPC · JPL |
| 401115 | 2011 UP_{268} | — | November 7, 2007 | Mount Lemmon | Mount Lemmon Survey | · | 2.4 km | MPC · JPL |
| 401116 | 2011 US_{268} | — | December 30, 2008 | Kitt Peak | Spacewatch | · | 780 m | MPC · JPL |
| 401117 | 2011 UF_{275} | — | October 23, 2011 | Kitt Peak | Spacewatch | · | 3.3 km | MPC · JPL |
| 401118 | 2011 UL_{275} | — | December 16, 2007 | Kitt Peak | Spacewatch | · | 1.7 km | MPC · JPL |
| 401119 | 2011 UB_{277} | — | September 5, 1999 | Kitt Peak | Spacewatch | · | 1.3 km | MPC · JPL |
| 401120 | 2011 US_{280} | — | October 8, 2004 | Kitt Peak | Spacewatch | (2076) | 760 m | MPC · JPL |
| 401121 | 2011 UF_{281} | — | November 25, 2000 | Kitt Peak | Spacewatch | · | 1.4 km | MPC · JPL |
| 401122 | 2011 UE_{284} | — | October 28, 2011 | Kitt Peak | Spacewatch | (5) | 1.3 km | MPC · JPL |
| 401123 | 2011 UW_{286} | — | January 16, 2004 | Kitt Peak | Spacewatch | · | 1.6 km | MPC · JPL |
| 401124 | 2011 UA_{293} | — | December 21, 2008 | Mount Lemmon | Mount Lemmon Survey | NYS | 1.3 km | MPC · JPL |
| 401125 | 2011 UF_{293} | — | December 3, 2004 | Kitt Peak | Spacewatch | · | 1.1 km | MPC · JPL |
| 401126 | 2011 UZ_{294} | — | May 15, 2004 | Campo Imperatore | CINEOS | · | 820 m | MPC · JPL |
| 401127 | 2011 US_{299} | — | October 6, 2005 | Kitt Peak | Spacewatch | · | 3.3 km | MPC · JPL |
| 401128 | 2011 US_{306} | — | October 2, 1997 | Caussols | ODAS | · | 910 m | MPC · JPL |
| 401129 | 2011 UW_{307} | — | November 20, 2000 | Socorro | LINEAR | · | 4.2 km | MPC · JPL |
| 401130 | 2011 UJ_{309} | — | December 30, 2008 | Mount Lemmon | Mount Lemmon Survey | · | 1.2 km | MPC · JPL |
| 401131 | 2011 UL_{314} | — | September 11, 2007 | Kitt Peak | Spacewatch | NYS | 1.2 km | MPC · JPL |
| 401132 | 2011 UF_{316} | — | April 7, 2010 | Kitt Peak | Spacewatch | · | 750 m | MPC · JPL |
| 401133 | 2011 UE_{317} | — | September 24, 2011 | Mount Lemmon | Mount Lemmon Survey | · | 790 m | MPC · JPL |
| 401134 | 2011 UX_{326} | — | September 23, 2006 | Kitt Peak | Spacewatch | · | 1.5 km | MPC · JPL |
| 401135 | 2011 UN_{336} | — | November 11, 2004 | Kitt Peak | Spacewatch | · | 760 m | MPC · JPL |
| 401136 | 2011 UN_{338} | — | April 8, 2010 | Kitt Peak | Spacewatch | · | 980 m | MPC · JPL |
| 401137 | 2011 UL_{361} | — | May 17, 2005 | Mount Lemmon | Mount Lemmon Survey | MAR | 1.1 km | MPC · JPL |
| 401138 | 2011 UC_{371} | — | May 5, 2003 | Anderson Mesa | LONEOS | PHO | 1.6 km | MPC · JPL |
| 401139 | 2011 UB_{376} | — | October 7, 2004 | Kitt Peak | Spacewatch | · | 760 m | MPC · JPL |
| 401140 | 2011 UW_{379} | — | October 10, 2004 | Kitt Peak | Spacewatch | · | 1.2 km | MPC · JPL |
| 401141 | 2011 UP_{384} | — | August 3, 1999 | Kitt Peak | Spacewatch | · | 1.4 km | MPC · JPL |
| 401142 | 2011 UX_{386} | — | September 20, 2006 | Catalina | CSS | GEF | 1.5 km | MPC · JPL |
| 401143 | 2011 UL_{398} | — | June 21, 2010 | Mount Lemmon | Mount Lemmon Survey | · | 2.2 km | MPC · JPL |
| 401144 | 2011 UL_{399} | — | August 22, 2007 | Anderson Mesa | LONEOS | MAS | 770 m | MPC · JPL |
| 401145 | 2011 UU_{404} | — | October 3, 2011 | XuYi | PMO NEO Survey Program | · | 1.9 km | MPC · JPL |
| 401146 | 2011 VD_{9} | — | September 27, 2000 | Socorro | LINEAR | · | 3.7 km | MPC · JPL |
| 401147 | 2011 VY_{10} | — | March 20, 2010 | Kitt Peak | Spacewatch | MAS | 730 m | MPC · JPL |
| 401148 | 2011 VO_{11} | — | November 27, 2006 | Kitt Peak | Spacewatch | · | 2.0 km | MPC · JPL |
| 401149 | 2011 VK_{12} | — | April 22, 2009 | Mount Lemmon | Mount Lemmon Survey | · | 3.3 km | MPC · JPL |
| 401150 | 2011 VH_{13} | — | November 15, 1998 | Kitt Peak | Spacewatch | · | 2.4 km | MPC · JPL |
| 401151 | 2011 VP_{13} | — | September 21, 2001 | Socorro | LINEAR | · | 570 m | MPC · JPL |
| 401152 | 2011 VJ_{16} | — | September 23, 2011 | Kitt Peak | Spacewatch | ERI | 1.6 km | MPC · JPL |
| 401153 | 2011 WQ_{1} | — | July 26, 2006 | Siding Spring | SSS | · | 1.7 km | MPC · JPL |
| 401154 | 2011 WD_{2} | — | September 17, 2006 | Catalina | CSS | HNS | 1.9 km | MPC · JPL |
| 401155 | 2011 WB_{4} | — | April 2, 2005 | Mount Lemmon | Mount Lemmon Survey | · | 1.1 km | MPC · JPL |
| 401156 | 2011 WF_{15} | — | November 20, 2003 | Socorro | LINEAR | · | 1.1 km | MPC · JPL |
| 401157 | 2011 WQ_{16} | — | December 4, 2007 | Mount Lemmon | Mount Lemmon Survey | · | 2.1 km | MPC · JPL |
| 401158 | 2011 WP_{27} | — | January 6, 2005 | Socorro | LINEAR | · | 1.3 km | MPC · JPL |
| 401159 | 2011 WR_{35} | — | November 23, 2011 | Catalina | CSS | · | 3.3 km | MPC · JPL |
| 401160 | 2011 WY_{43} | — | December 12, 2006 | Kitt Peak | Spacewatch | · | 2.5 km | MPC · JPL |
| 401161 | 2011 WK_{48} | — | May 16, 2009 | Mount Lemmon | Mount Lemmon Survey | · | 2.0 km | MPC · JPL |
| 401162 | 2011 WN_{53} | — | October 2, 2000 | Kitt Peak | Spacewatch | NYS | 940 m | MPC · JPL |
| 401163 | 2011 WU_{53} | — | March 1, 2008 | Kitt Peak | Spacewatch | EMA | 3.3 km | MPC · JPL |
| 401164 | 2011 WV_{53} | — | April 8, 2010 | Kitt Peak | Spacewatch | · | 1.3 km | MPC · JPL |
| 401165 | 2011 WX_{54} | — | October 27, 2011 | Mount Lemmon | Mount Lemmon Survey | · | 1.6 km | MPC · JPL |
| 401166 | 2011 WY_{54} | — | October 15, 2007 | Kitt Peak | Spacewatch | V | 770 m | MPC · JPL |
| 401167 | 2011 WZ_{54} | — | October 10, 2007 | Mount Lemmon | Mount Lemmon Survey | · | 1.2 km | MPC · JPL |
| 401168 | 2011 WJ_{59} | — | October 21, 2011 | Mount Lemmon | Mount Lemmon Survey | · | 1.5 km | MPC · JPL |
| 401169 | 2011 WE_{60} | — | December 15, 2007 | Mount Lemmon | Mount Lemmon Survey | · | 1.1 km | MPC · JPL |
| 401170 | 2011 WQ_{63} | — | June 1, 2010 | WISE | WISE | · | 4.5 km | MPC · JPL |
| 401171 | 2011 WD_{65} | — | December 9, 2006 | Kitt Peak | Spacewatch | · | 2.1 km | MPC · JPL |
| 401172 | 2011 WS_{65} | — | September 25, 2005 | Kitt Peak | Spacewatch | · | 2.2 km | MPC · JPL |
| 401173 | 2011 WH_{70} | — | October 23, 2004 | Kitt Peak | Spacewatch | · | 660 m | MPC · JPL |
| 401174 | 2011 WM_{70} | — | October 23, 2004 | Kitt Peak | Spacewatch | · | 620 m | MPC · JPL |
| 401175 | 2011 WV_{88} | — | February 9, 2008 | Catalina | CSS | · | 2.3 km | MPC · JPL |
| 401176 | 2011 WN_{94} | — | April 21, 2009 | Mount Lemmon | Mount Lemmon Survey | KON | 2.2 km | MPC · JPL |
| 401177 | 2011 WT_{96} | — | March 31, 2003 | Kitt Peak | Spacewatch | · | 940 m | MPC · JPL |
| 401178 | 2011 WF_{97} | — | October 20, 2006 | Kitt Peak | Spacewatch | · | 2.1 km | MPC · JPL |
| 401179 | 2011 WA_{98} | — | May 10, 2005 | Kitt Peak | Spacewatch | · | 1.8 km | MPC · JPL |
| 401180 | 2011 WF_{99} | — | December 17, 2001 | Socorro | LINEAR | · | 3.9 km | MPC · JPL |
| 401181 | 2011 WL_{102} | — | May 4, 2010 | WISE | WISE | · | 2.1 km | MPC · JPL |
| 401182 | 2011 WD_{103} | — | June 7, 2010 | WISE | WISE | · | 3.3 km | MPC · JPL |
| 401183 | 2011 WE_{103} | — | November 1, 2006 | Mount Lemmon | Mount Lemmon Survey | · | 3.8 km | MPC · JPL |
| 401184 | 2011 WM_{104} | — | April 15, 2008 | Mount Lemmon | Mount Lemmon Survey | · | 2.4 km | MPC · JPL |
| 401185 | 2011 WE_{108} | — | October 11, 2005 | Kitt Peak | Spacewatch | · | 2.4 km | MPC · JPL |
| 401186 | 2011 WJ_{109} | — | September 30, 2003 | Kitt Peak | Spacewatch | · | 1.3 km | MPC · JPL |
| 401187 | 2011 WS_{113} | — | November 8, 2007 | Mount Lemmon | Mount Lemmon Survey | · | 1.9 km | MPC · JPL |
| 401188 | 2011 WV_{115} | — | January 31, 2009 | Kitt Peak | Spacewatch | · | 1 km | MPC · JPL |
| 401189 | 2011 WA_{120} | — | December 12, 2004 | Kitt Peak | Spacewatch | · | 960 m | MPC · JPL |
| 401190 | 2011 WP_{120} | — | December 10, 2004 | Socorro | LINEAR | · | 990 m | MPC · JPL |
| 401191 | 2011 WL_{125} | — | October 13, 2007 | Catalina | CSS | · | 1.3 km | MPC · JPL |
| 401192 | 2011 WN_{127} | — | June 23, 2007 | Kitt Peak | Spacewatch | · | 730 m | MPC · JPL |
| 401193 | 2011 WD_{134} | — | November 17, 2011 | Kitt Peak | Spacewatch | · | 2.2 km | MPC · JPL |
| 401194 | 2011 WX_{137} | — | May 8, 2005 | Kitt Peak | Spacewatch | · | 1.1 km | MPC · JPL |
| 401195 | 2011 WJ_{139} | — | November 1, 2011 | Mount Lemmon | Mount Lemmon Survey | EUN | 1.5 km | MPC · JPL |
| 401196 | 2011 WO_{139} | — | October 27, 2006 | Catalina | CSS | GEF | 1.4 km | MPC · JPL |
| 401197 | 2011 WQ_{142} | — | October 18, 2011 | Kitt Peak | Spacewatch | · | 2.1 km | MPC · JPL |
| 401198 | 2011 WS_{145} | — | February 4, 2005 | Kitt Peak | Spacewatch | V | 770 m | MPC · JPL |
| 401199 | 2011 WJ_{153} | — | July 4, 2010 | Kitt Peak | Spacewatch | · | 2.1 km | MPC · JPL |
| 401200 | 2011 YC_{1} | — | September 18, 2010 | Mount Lemmon | Mount Lemmon Survey | · | 3.7 km | MPC · JPL |

== 401201–401300 ==
back to top

| Designation | | | Discovery | | | Properties | | Ref |
| Permanent | Provisional | Named after | Date | Site | Discoverer(s) | Category | Diam. | Ref |
|---|---|---|---|---|---|---|---|---|
| 401201 | 2011 YR_{1} | — | June 13, 2007 | Catalina | CSS | PHO | 1.5 km | MPC · JPL |
| 401202 | 2011 YD_{7} | — | November 18, 2011 | Mount Lemmon | Mount Lemmon Survey | EOS | 2.2 km | MPC · JPL |
| 401203 | 2011 YF_{7} | — | November 18, 2007 | Kitt Peak | Spacewatch | · | 1.4 km | MPC · JPL |
| 401204 | 2011 YC_{8} | — | November 16, 2006 | Kitt Peak | Spacewatch | · | 1.8 km | MPC · JPL |
| 401205 | 2011 YE_{13} | — | October 22, 2006 | Mount Lemmon | Mount Lemmon Survey | · | 2.2 km | MPC · JPL |
| 401206 | 2011 YU_{19} | — | April 14, 2008 | Mount Lemmon | Mount Lemmon Survey | · | 3.2 km | MPC · JPL |
| 401207 | 2011 YN_{20} | — | January 19, 2008 | Mount Lemmon | Mount Lemmon Survey | MAR | 1.1 km | MPC · JPL |
| 401208 | 2011 YA_{25} | — | November 9, 2007 | Mount Lemmon | Mount Lemmon Survey | MAR | 1.3 km | MPC · JPL |
| 401209 | 2011 YO_{26} | — | December 25, 2011 | Kitt Peak | Spacewatch | THB | 4.0 km | MPC · JPL |
| 401210 | 2011 YD_{32} | — | December 26, 2011 | Kitt Peak | Spacewatch | · | 3.7 km | MPC · JPL |
| 401211 | 2011 YL_{37} | — | August 27, 2006 | Kitt Peak | Spacewatch | · | 1.3 km | MPC · JPL |
| 401212 | 2011 YZ_{37} | — | April 28, 2008 | Mount Lemmon | Mount Lemmon Survey | · | 3.8 km | MPC · JPL |
| 401213 | 2011 YY_{42} | — | January 12, 2008 | Kitt Peak | Spacewatch | · | 1.3 km | MPC · JPL |
| 401214 | 2011 YF_{44} | — | July 2, 2010 | WISE | WISE | · | 4.9 km | MPC · JPL |
| 401215 | 2011 YM_{44} | — | October 23, 2006 | Mount Lemmon | Mount Lemmon Survey | AGN | 1.2 km | MPC · JPL |
| 401216 | 2011 YF_{45} | — | June 21, 2010 | WISE | WISE | · | 3.1 km | MPC · JPL |
| 401217 | 2011 YD_{46} | — | February 16, 2007 | Catalina | CSS | · | 3.7 km | MPC · JPL |
| 401218 | 2011 YW_{57} | — | December 5, 2007 | Kitt Peak | Spacewatch | · | 1.8 km | MPC · JPL |
| 401219 | 2011 YF_{59} | — | April 27, 2009 | Kitt Peak | Spacewatch | · | 1.9 km | MPC · JPL |
| 401220 | 2011 YG_{64} | — | December 13, 2006 | Mount Lemmon | Mount Lemmon Survey | · | 4.0 km | MPC · JPL |
| 401221 | 2011 YD_{67} | — | November 12, 2010 | Mount Lemmon | Mount Lemmon Survey | · | 3.3 km | MPC · JPL |
| 401222 | 2011 YG_{69} | — | April 13, 2005 | Catalina | CSS | · | 1.9 km | MPC · JPL |
| 401223 | 2011 YA_{71} | — | May 15, 2008 | Mount Lemmon | Mount Lemmon Survey | · | 3.5 km | MPC · JPL |
| 401224 | 2011 YK_{77} | — | June 26, 1997 | Kitt Peak | Spacewatch | · | 1.6 km | MPC · JPL |
| 401225 | 2012 AR_{4} | — | August 29, 2006 | Anderson Mesa | LONEOS | · | 2.1 km | MPC · JPL |
| 401226 | 2012 AE_{6} | — | October 7, 2004 | Socorro | LINEAR | · | 840 m | MPC · JPL |
| 401227 | 2012 AN_{7} | — | October 11, 2010 | Mount Lemmon | Mount Lemmon Survey | · | 2.8 km | MPC · JPL |
| 401228 | 2012 AL_{8} | — | February 10, 1999 | Kitt Peak | Spacewatch | · | 1.9 km | MPC · JPL |
| 401229 | 2012 AS_{9} | — | August 27, 2006 | Anderson Mesa | LONEOS | · | 1.3 km | MPC · JPL |
| 401230 | 2012 AN_{13} | — | December 27, 2011 | Kitt Peak | Spacewatch | EOS | 2.1 km | MPC · JPL |
| 401231 | 2012 AK_{14} | — | December 15, 2007 | Kitt Peak | Spacewatch | · | 2.3 km | MPC · JPL |
| 401232 | 2012 AC_{17} | — | February 22, 2007 | Catalina | CSS | · | 3.1 km | MPC · JPL |
| 401233 | 2012 AW_{18} | — | October 30, 2010 | Mount Lemmon | Mount Lemmon Survey | · | 3.4 km | MPC · JPL |
| 401234 | 2012 AM_{23} | — | July 5, 2005 | Kitt Peak | Spacewatch | · | 1.9 km | MPC · JPL |
| 401235 | 2012 AH_{24} | — | September 15, 2009 | Mount Lemmon | Mount Lemmon Survey | VER | 3.3 km | MPC · JPL |
| 401236 | 2012 BH_{5} | — | September 18, 2003 | Kitt Peak | Spacewatch | · | 3.6 km | MPC · JPL |
| 401237 | 2012 BM_{6} | — | January 16, 2004 | Kitt Peak | Spacewatch | · | 1.1 km | MPC · JPL |
| 401238 | 2012 BW_{9} | — | March 16, 2007 | Kitt Peak | Spacewatch | · | 3.6 km | MPC · JPL |
| 401239 | 2012 BA_{18} | — | June 15, 2010 | WISE | WISE | · | 3.5 km | MPC · JPL |
| 401240 | 2012 BR_{20} | — | February 2, 2008 | Kitt Peak | Spacewatch | MAR | 1.2 km | MPC · JPL |
| 401241 | 2012 BQ_{22} | — | November 13, 2010 | Mount Lemmon | Mount Lemmon Survey | · | 3.3 km | MPC · JPL |
| 401242 | 2012 BD_{24} | — | September 18, 2010 | Mount Lemmon | Mount Lemmon Survey | · | 3.3 km | MPC · JPL |
| 401243 | 2012 BR_{24} | — | January 4, 2012 | Mount Lemmon | Mount Lemmon Survey | · | 3.4 km | MPC · JPL |
| 401244 | 2012 BR_{34} | — | December 24, 2005 | Kitt Peak | Spacewatch | · | 3.4 km | MPC · JPL |
| 401245 | 2012 BC_{36} | — | February 2, 2008 | Kitt Peak | Spacewatch | · | 1.5 km | MPC · JPL |
| 401246 | 2012 BA_{48} | — | February 1, 2003 | Socorro | LINEAR | · | 2.7 km | MPC · JPL |
| 401247 | 2012 BM_{52} | — | February 3, 2008 | Kitt Peak | Spacewatch | (10369) | 1.6 km | MPC · JPL |
| 401248 | 2012 BC_{56} | — | January 21, 2012 | Kitt Peak | Spacewatch | · | 3.6 km | MPC · JPL |
| 401249 | 2012 BV_{62} | — | January 27, 2007 | Mount Lemmon | Mount Lemmon Survey | · | 1.6 km | MPC · JPL |
| 401250 | 2012 BE_{63} | — | December 13, 2006 | Mount Lemmon | Mount Lemmon Survey | NEM | 2.2 km | MPC · JPL |
| 401251 | 2012 BW_{73} | — | November 14, 2010 | Kitt Peak | Spacewatch | · | 2.8 km | MPC · JPL |
| 401252 | 2012 BB_{78} | — | September 7, 1997 | Caussols | ODAS | · | 650 m | MPC · JPL |
| 401253 | 2012 BY_{79} | — | February 22, 2007 | Kitt Peak | Spacewatch | EOS | 1.8 km | MPC · JPL |
| 401254 | 2012 BW_{84} | — | January 17, 2007 | Kitt Peak | Spacewatch | · | 3.0 km | MPC · JPL |
| 401255 | 2012 BD_{88} | — | March 16, 2007 | Kitt Peak | Spacewatch | · | 3.6 km | MPC · JPL |
| 401256 | 2012 BH_{88} | — | January 12, 1996 | Kitt Peak | Spacewatch | · | 2.4 km | MPC · JPL |
| 401257 | 2012 BW_{90} | — | May 13, 2004 | Kitt Peak | Spacewatch | · | 2.5 km | MPC · JPL |
| 401258 | 2012 BH_{92} | — | December 21, 2006 | Mount Lemmon | Mount Lemmon Survey | BRA | 1.8 km | MPC · JPL |
| 401259 | 2012 BG_{93} | — | April 1, 2008 | Mount Lemmon | Mount Lemmon Survey | · | 2.1 km | MPC · JPL |
| 401260 | 2012 BJ_{99} | — | December 27, 2005 | Kitt Peak | Spacewatch | · | 3.2 km | MPC · JPL |
| 401261 | 2012 BK_{105} | — | November 2, 2010 | Kitt Peak | Spacewatch | VER | 3.9 km | MPC · JPL |
| 401262 | 2012 BV_{110} | — | February 19, 2001 | Socorro | LINEAR | · | 3.8 km | MPC · JPL |
| 401263 | 2012 BD_{112} | — | August 8, 2004 | Socorro | LINEAR | TEL | 1.8 km | MPC · JPL |
| 401264 | 2012 BA_{123} | — | April 27, 2008 | Mount Lemmon | Mount Lemmon Survey | · | 3.1 km | MPC · JPL |
| 401265 | 2012 BR_{130} | — | April 1, 2008 | Kitt Peak | Spacewatch | EOS | 2.6 km | MPC · JPL |
| 401266 | 2012 BZ_{131} | — | February 17, 2001 | Socorro | LINEAR | · | 3.5 km | MPC · JPL |
| 401267 | 2012 BF_{133} | — | May 3, 2008 | Kitt Peak | Spacewatch | · | 5.2 km | MPC · JPL |
| 401268 | 2012 BG_{143} | — | May 26, 2008 | Mount Lemmon | Mount Lemmon Survey | EOS | 1.8 km | MPC · JPL |
| 401269 | 2012 BE_{144} | — | November 29, 2005 | Kitt Peak | Spacewatch | · | 4.0 km | MPC · JPL |
| 401270 | 2012 CY_{9} | — | January 4, 2012 | Mount Lemmon | Mount Lemmon Survey | · | 3.4 km | MPC · JPL |
| 401271 | 2012 CX_{10} | — | August 31, 2003 | Kitt Peak | Spacewatch | · | 3.8 km | MPC · JPL |
| 401272 | 2012 CG_{11} | — | February 21, 2007 | Mount Lemmon | Mount Lemmon Survey | EOS | 2.0 km | MPC · JPL |
| 401273 | 2012 CY_{14} | — | August 18, 2009 | Kitt Peak | Spacewatch | · | 3.0 km | MPC · JPL |
| 401274 | 2012 CY_{24} | — | December 28, 2005 | Kitt Peak | Spacewatch | · | 4.1 km | MPC · JPL |
| 401275 | 2012 CO_{25} | — | March 13, 2007 | Kitt Peak | Spacewatch | (159) | 2.5 km | MPC · JPL |
| 401276 | 2012 CX_{38} | — | May 8, 2008 | Mount Lemmon | Mount Lemmon Survey | · | 3.2 km | MPC · JPL |
| 401277 | 2012 CG_{41} | — | September 8, 2004 | Socorro | LINEAR | · | 3.5 km | MPC · JPL |
| 401278 | 2012 CL_{41} | — | February 8, 2008 | Kitt Peak | Spacewatch | · | 1.4 km | MPC · JPL |
| 401279 | 2012 CD_{45} | — | July 3, 2003 | Kitt Peak | Spacewatch | · | 4.0 km | MPC · JPL |
| 401280 | 2012 CX_{52} | — | November 22, 2005 | Catalina | CSS | · | 2.2 km | MPC · JPL |
| 401281 | 2012 CU_{53} | — | December 27, 2005 | Kitt Peak | Spacewatch | · | 4.1 km | MPC · JPL |
| 401282 | 2012 DD_{5} | — | April 30, 2008 | Mount Lemmon | Mount Lemmon Survey | EOS | 2.0 km | MPC · JPL |
| 401283 | 2012 DN_{11} | — | November 28, 2005 | Kitt Peak | Spacewatch | EOS | 2.2 km | MPC · JPL |
| 401284 | 2012 DC_{19} | — | November 7, 2010 | Mount Lemmon | Mount Lemmon Survey | · | 3.8 km | MPC · JPL |
| 401285 | 2012 DZ_{26} | — | August 3, 2008 | Siding Spring | SSS | · | 4.0 km | MPC · JPL |
| 401286 | 2012 DE_{32} | — | August 27, 2009 | Kitt Peak | Spacewatch | · | 3.4 km | MPC · JPL |
| 401287 | 2012 DA_{41} | — | September 30, 2005 | Mount Lemmon | Mount Lemmon Survey | · | 3.8 km | MPC · JPL |
| 401288 | 2012 DU_{44} | — | February 16, 2001 | Kitt Peak | Spacewatch | · | 3.0 km | MPC · JPL |
| 401289 | 2012 DB_{55} | — | September 13, 2005 | Catalina | CSS | BRA | 1.9 km | MPC · JPL |
| 401290 | 2012 DH_{57} | — | October 26, 2005 | Kitt Peak | Spacewatch | AGN | 1.7 km | MPC · JPL |
| 401291 | 2012 DU_{62} | — | September 24, 2000 | Kitt Peak | Spacewatch | GEF | 1.9 km | MPC · JPL |
| 401292 | 2012 DA_{80} | — | October 29, 2005 | Mount Lemmon | Mount Lemmon Survey | KOR | 1.8 km | MPC · JPL |
| 401293 | 2012 DF_{80} | — | September 7, 2008 | Catalina | CSS | SYL · CYB | 3.6 km | MPC · JPL |
| 401294 | 2012 DZ_{92} | — | January 27, 2007 | Mount Lemmon | Mount Lemmon Survey | AGN | 1.2 km | MPC · JPL |
| 401295 | 2012 FR | — | February 2, 2006 | Mount Lemmon | Mount Lemmon Survey | · | 4.0 km | MPC · JPL |
| 401296 | 2012 FW_{31} | — | April 26, 2007 | Kitt Peak | Spacewatch | · | 3.7 km | MPC · JPL |
| 401297 | 2012 FN_{42} | — | September 19, 2003 | Kitt Peak | Spacewatch | · | 4.5 km | MPC · JPL |
| 401298 | 2012 FW_{81} | — | February 16, 2001 | Socorro | LINEAR | · | 3.2 km | MPC · JPL |
| 401299 | 2012 GF_{34} | — | September 19, 2003 | Kitt Peak | Spacewatch | · | 3.6 km | MPC · JPL |
| 401300 | 2012 HQ_{31} | — | March 27, 2004 | Socorro | LINEAR | 3:2 | 6.4 km | MPC · JPL |

== 401301–401400 ==
back to top

| Designation | | | Discovery | | | Properties | | Ref |
| Permanent | Provisional | Named after | Date | Site | Discoverer(s) | Category | Diam. | Ref |
|---|---|---|---|---|---|---|---|---|
| 401301 | 2012 TE_{20} | — | May 28, 2006 | Kitt Peak | Spacewatch | H | 500 m | MPC · JPL |
| 401302 | 2012 TR_{187} | — | October 19, 2003 | Socorro | LINEAR | EUN | 1.3 km | MPC · JPL |
| 401303 | 2012 UR_{127} | — | March 2, 2011 | Catalina | CSS | H | 570 m | MPC · JPL |
| 401304 | 2012 UU_{127} | — | November 17, 2001 | Socorro | LINEAR | H | 710 m | MPC · JPL |
| 401305 | 2012 WU_{4} | — | November 26, 2005 | Kitt Peak | Spacewatch | V | 830 m | MPC · JPL |
| 401306 | 2012 WK_{24} | — | December 24, 2005 | Kitt Peak | Spacewatch | · | 1.3 km | MPC · JPL |
| 401307 | 2012 XM_{34} | — | November 30, 2005 | Kitt Peak | Spacewatch | · | 970 m | MPC · JPL |
| 401308 | 2012 XP_{51} | — | April 24, 2003 | Anderson Mesa | LONEOS | PHO | 1.0 km | MPC · JPL |
| 401309 | 2012 XS_{55} | — | January 11, 2005 | Socorro | LINEAR | H | 690 m | MPC · JPL |
| 401310 | 2012 XT_{80} | — | November 7, 2012 | Mount Lemmon | Mount Lemmon Survey | · | 740 m | MPC · JPL |
| 401311 | 2012 XT_{142} | — | January 9, 2002 | Socorro | LINEAR | H | 590 m | MPC · JPL |
| 401312 | 2012 XQ_{151} | — | March 5, 2006 | Kitt Peak | Spacewatch | · | 1.3 km | MPC · JPL |
| 401313 | 2012 XK_{156} | — | December 19, 2003 | Socorro | LINEAR | · | 2.8 km | MPC · JPL |
| 401314 | 2012 YK_{1} | — | February 12, 2004 | Kitt Peak | Spacewatch | GEF | 1.5 km | MPC · JPL |
| 401315 | 2013 AB_{1} | — | February 3, 2008 | Catalina | CSS | H | 620 m | MPC · JPL |
| 401316 | 2013 AU_{6} | — | December 1, 2008 | Mount Lemmon | Mount Lemmon Survey | HNS · fast | 1.5 km | MPC · JPL |
| 401317 | 2013 AQ_{8} | — | December 10, 2012 | Kitt Peak | Spacewatch | KON | 2.8 km | MPC · JPL |
| 401318 | 2013 AE_{11} | — | April 1, 2009 | Catalina | CSS | · | 1.7 km | MPC · JPL |
| 401319 | 2013 AP_{15} | — | January 8, 2007 | Kitt Peak | Spacewatch | EUP | 6.5 km | MPC · JPL |
| 401320 | 2013 AR_{18} | — | February 26, 2009 | Catalina | CSS | · | 2.1 km | MPC · JPL |
| 401321 | 2013 AA_{22} | — | March 6, 2008 | Mount Lemmon | Mount Lemmon Survey | · | 3.9 km | MPC · JPL |
| 401322 | 2013 AH_{22} | — | January 19, 2008 | Mount Lemmon | Mount Lemmon Survey | · | 3.8 km | MPC · JPL |
| 401323 | 2013 AY_{22} | — | January 10, 2006 | Mount Lemmon | Mount Lemmon Survey | · | 1.1 km | MPC · JPL |
| 401324 | 2013 AD_{33} | — | October 29, 2008 | Kitt Peak | Spacewatch | · | 1.7 km | MPC · JPL |
| 401325 | 2013 AK_{39} | — | January 8, 2010 | Mount Lemmon | Mount Lemmon Survey | · | 840 m | MPC · JPL |
| 401326 | 2013 AR_{40} | — | September 14, 2006 | Catalina | CSS | · | 2.1 km | MPC · JPL |
| 401327 | 2013 AG_{52} | — | February 2, 2009 | Mount Lemmon | Mount Lemmon Survey | · | 1.9 km | MPC · JPL |
| 401328 | 2013 AT_{54} | — | June 17, 2010 | Mount Lemmon | Mount Lemmon Survey | · | 1.3 km | MPC · JPL |
| 401329 | 2013 AD_{55} | — | December 16, 2007 | Mount Lemmon | Mount Lemmon Survey | · | 1.8 km | MPC · JPL |
| 401330 | 2013 AU_{55} | — | August 13, 2007 | Siding Spring | SSS | · | 1.4 km | MPC · JPL |
| 401331 | 2013 AD_{58} | — | December 21, 2008 | Kitt Peak | Spacewatch | · | 1.4 km | MPC · JPL |
| 401332 | 2013 AW_{58} | — | September 10, 2004 | Socorro | LINEAR | · | 1.2 km | MPC · JPL |
| 401333 | 2013 AL_{68} | — | January 5, 2002 | Kitt Peak | Spacewatch | TIR | 3.3 km | MPC · JPL |
| 401334 | 2013 AA_{73} | — | November 20, 2007 | Mount Lemmon | Mount Lemmon Survey | H | 720 m | MPC · JPL |
| 401335 | 2013 AA_{75} | — | September 29, 2008 | Mount Lemmon | Mount Lemmon Survey | · | 800 m | MPC · JPL |
| 401336 | 2013 AU_{78} | — | October 28, 2005 | Mount Lemmon | Mount Lemmon Survey | · | 2.7 km | MPC · JPL |
| 401337 | 2013 AM_{83} | — | October 8, 2007 | Catalina | CSS | · | 2.5 km | MPC · JPL |
| 401338 | 2013 AU_{83} | — | January 20, 2006 | Kitt Peak | Spacewatch | · | 1.3 km | MPC · JPL |
| 401339 | 2013 AE_{85} | — | November 21, 2008 | Kitt Peak | Spacewatch | · | 1.1 km | MPC · JPL |
| 401340 | 2013 AF_{89} | — | March 31, 2009 | Mount Lemmon | Mount Lemmon Survey | · | 2.0 km | MPC · JPL |
| 401341 | 2013 AH_{89} | — | November 29, 2003 | Kitt Peak | Spacewatch | · | 1.6 km | MPC · JPL |
| 401342 | 2013 AU_{93} | — | November 17, 2007 | Kitt Peak | Spacewatch | · | 1.7 km | MPC · JPL |
| 401343 | 2013 AK_{100} | — | January 19, 2004 | Kitt Peak | Spacewatch | · | 2.4 km | MPC · JPL |
| 401344 | 2013 AY_{101} | — | September 7, 2008 | Mount Lemmon | Mount Lemmon Survey | · | 850 m | MPC · JPL |
| 401345 | 2013 AJ_{103} | — | November 27, 2006 | Mount Lemmon | Mount Lemmon Survey | · | 3.6 km | MPC · JPL |
| 401346 | 2013 AL_{104} | — | January 13, 2002 | Socorro | LINEAR | · | 2.7 km | MPC · JPL |
| 401347 | 2013 AY_{118} | — | February 14, 2004 | Socorro | LINEAR | · | 2.1 km | MPC · JPL |
| 401348 | 2013 AN_{119} | — | October 25, 2005 | Kitt Peak | Spacewatch | (883) | 740 m | MPC · JPL |
| 401349 | 2013 AG_{120} | — | March 19, 2009 | Kitt Peak | Spacewatch | MRX | 1.1 km | MPC · JPL |
| 401350 | 2013 AZ_{123} | — | September 24, 2011 | Mount Lemmon | Mount Lemmon Survey | NYS | 1.2 km | MPC · JPL |
| 401351 | 2013 AG_{147} | — | May 10, 2005 | Mount Lemmon | Mount Lemmon Survey | · | 2.1 km | MPC · JPL |
| 401352 | 2013 AY_{149} | — | October 21, 2007 | Mount Lemmon | Mount Lemmon Survey | EUN | 1.4 km | MPC · JPL |
| 401353 | 2013 AF_{166} | — | January 18, 2009 | Kitt Peak | Spacewatch | · | 1.3 km | MPC · JPL |
| 401354 | 2013 BR_{4} | — | December 22, 2008 | Mount Lemmon | Mount Lemmon Survey | HNS | 1.2 km | MPC · JPL |
| 401355 | 2013 BX_{9} | — | February 4, 2009 | Catalina | CSS | EUN | 1.2 km | MPC · JPL |
| 401356 | 2013 BT_{21} | — | October 4, 2004 | Kitt Peak | Spacewatch | · | 1.3 km | MPC · JPL |
| 401357 | 2013 BD_{23} | — | May 20, 2006 | Anderson Mesa | LONEOS | PHO | 1.5 km | MPC · JPL |
| 401358 | 2013 BM_{24} | — | November 19, 2003 | Kitt Peak | Spacewatch | · | 1.6 km | MPC · JPL |
| 401359 | 2013 BK_{32} | — | October 25, 2008 | Kitt Peak | Spacewatch | · | 710 m | MPC · JPL |
| 401360 | 2013 BE_{37} | — | December 6, 2005 | Kitt Peak | Spacewatch | · | 820 m | MPC · JPL |
| 401361 | 2013 BD_{39} | — | March 13, 2010 | Kitt Peak | Spacewatch | · | 640 m | MPC · JPL |
| 401362 | 2013 BO_{39} | — | December 4, 2008 | Mount Lemmon | Mount Lemmon Survey | · | 1.3 km | MPC · JPL |
| 401363 | 2013 BZ_{39} | — | February 4, 2009 | Mount Lemmon | Mount Lemmon Survey | · | 1.6 km | MPC · JPL |
| 401364 | 2013 BF_{43} | — | November 2, 2007 | Mount Lemmon | Mount Lemmon Survey | · | 1.6 km | MPC · JPL |
| 401365 | 2013 BM_{45} | — | November 12, 2004 | Siding Spring | SSS | H | 620 m | MPC · JPL |
| 401366 | 2013 BF_{60} | — | April 17, 2009 | Mount Lemmon | Mount Lemmon Survey | · | 2.4 km | MPC · JPL |
| 401367 | 2013 BZ_{60} | — | November 24, 2008 | Mount Lemmon | Mount Lemmon Survey | MAS | 800 m | MPC · JPL |
| 401368 | 2013 BO_{63} | — | May 29, 2010 | WISE | WISE | · | 2.7 km | MPC · JPL |
| 401369 | 2013 BP_{63} | — | January 18, 2013 | Kitt Peak | Spacewatch | · | 750 m | MPC · JPL |
| 401370 | 2013 BM_{66} | — | August 31, 2011 | Siding Spring | SSS | · | 970 m | MPC · JPL |
| 401371 | 2013 BR_{66} | — | May 18, 2010 | Siding Spring | SSS | · | 1.7 km | MPC · JPL |
| 401372 | 2013 BE_{70} | — | November 1, 2006 | Catalina | CSS | H | 840 m | MPC · JPL |
| 401373 | 2013 BC_{76} | — | September 24, 2008 | Kitt Peak | Spacewatch | · | 830 m | MPC · JPL |
| 401374 | 2013 BR_{77} | — | February 23, 2006 | Kitt Peak | Spacewatch | MAS | 820 m | MPC · JPL |
| 401375 | 2013 CC | — | December 20, 2004 | Mount Lemmon | Mount Lemmon Survey | H | 530 m | MPC · JPL |
| 401376 | 2013 CE | — | October 26, 2008 | Mount Lemmon | Mount Lemmon Survey | · | 1.1 km | MPC · JPL |
| 401377 | 2013 CN_{5} | — | October 8, 2007 | Catalina | CSS | · | 1.7 km | MPC · JPL |
| 401378 | 2013 CL_{8} | — | January 8, 2006 | Mount Lemmon | Mount Lemmon Survey | · | 1.7 km | MPC · JPL |
| 401379 | 2013 CY_{11} | — | December 21, 2008 | Kitt Peak | Spacewatch | · | 1.1 km | MPC · JPL |
| 401380 | 2013 CH_{18} | — | March 21, 2009 | Catalina | CSS | · | 1.9 km | MPC · JPL |
| 401381 | 2013 CO_{18} | — | January 16, 2009 | Kitt Peak | Spacewatch | · | 1.3 km | MPC · JPL |
| 401382 | 2013 CV_{19} | — | November 17, 2006 | Mount Lemmon | Mount Lemmon Survey | · | 3.8 km | MPC · JPL |
| 401383 | 2013 CC_{24} | — | August 24, 2007 | Kitt Peak | Spacewatch | · | 1.4 km | MPC · JPL |
| 401384 | 2013 CV_{26} | — | August 18, 2003 | Campo Imperatore | CINEOS | PHO | 1.1 km | MPC · JPL |
| 401385 | 2013 CO_{28} | — | December 4, 2007 | Catalina | CSS | ADE | 1.8 km | MPC · JPL |
| 401386 | 2013 CM_{32} | — | April 24, 2006 | Kitt Peak | Spacewatch | NYS | 1.2 km | MPC · JPL |
| 401387 | 2013 CT_{32} | — | March 16, 2009 | Catalina | CSS | · | 2.6 km | MPC · JPL |
| 401388 | 2013 CH_{33} | — | November 16, 1998 | Kitt Peak | Spacewatch | · | 2.5 km | MPC · JPL |
| 401389 | 2013 CB_{34} | — | February 25, 2009 | Siding Spring | SSS | · | 1.9 km | MPC · JPL |
| 401390 | 2013 CT_{37} | — | September 29, 2005 | Kitt Peak | Spacewatch | · | 3.0 km | MPC · JPL |
| 401391 | 2013 CD_{38} | — | March 29, 2009 | Siding Spring | SSS | · | 3.0 km | MPC · JPL |
| 401392 | 2013 CN_{38} | — | September 11, 2006 | Catalina | CSS | (194) | 3.1 km | MPC · JPL |
| 401393 | 2013 CN_{43} | — | March 3, 2006 | Catalina | CSS | · | 1.2 km | MPC · JPL |
| 401394 | 2013 CP_{43} | — | October 21, 2001 | Kitt Peak | Spacewatch | · | 750 m | MPC · JPL |
| 401395 | 2013 CN_{44} | — | September 1, 2005 | Kitt Peak | Spacewatch | · | 2.1 km | MPC · JPL |
| 401396 | 2013 CR_{45} | — | December 22, 2008 | Mount Lemmon | Mount Lemmon Survey | V | 790 m | MPC · JPL |
| 401397 | 2013 CR_{49} | — | November 21, 2003 | Kitt Peak | Spacewatch | · | 1.2 km | MPC · JPL |
| 401398 | 2013 CU_{50} | — | October 25, 2008 | Kitt Peak | Spacewatch | · | 700 m | MPC · JPL |
| 401399 | 2013 CR_{51} | — | December 31, 2008 | Kitt Peak | Spacewatch | · | 1.5 km | MPC · JPL |
| 401400 | 2013 CK_{54} | — | November 19, 2008 | Mount Lemmon | Mount Lemmon Survey | · | 1.2 km | MPC · JPL |

== 401401–401500 ==
back to top

| Designation | | | Discovery | | | Properties | | Ref |
| Permanent | Provisional | Named after | Date | Site | Discoverer(s) | Category | Diam. | Ref |
|---|---|---|---|---|---|---|---|---|
| 401401 | 2013 CL_{57} | — | October 1, 2005 | Catalina | CSS | · | 2.3 km | MPC · JPL |
| 401402 | 2013 CY_{57} | — | April 12, 2008 | Catalina | CSS | · | 3.5 km | MPC · JPL |
| 401403 | 2013 CK_{61} | — | December 9, 1996 | Kitt Peak | Spacewatch | TEL | 1.6 km | MPC · JPL |
| 401404 | 2013 CX_{61} | — | April 9, 2006 | Mount Lemmon | Mount Lemmon Survey | NYS | 1.2 km | MPC · JPL |
| 401405 | 2013 CA_{63} | — | December 5, 2007 | Kitt Peak | Spacewatch | · | 2.3 km | MPC · JPL |
| 401406 | 2013 CG_{63} | — | February 27, 2009 | Kitt Peak | Spacewatch | · | 1.3 km | MPC · JPL |
| 401407 | 2013 CL_{64} | — | September 15, 2006 | Kitt Peak | Spacewatch | · | 1.7 km | MPC · JPL |
| 401408 | 2013 CP_{64} | — | February 26, 2009 | Kitt Peak | Spacewatch | EUN | 1.2 km | MPC · JPL |
| 401409 | 2013 CO_{65} | — | February 12, 2004 | Kitt Peak | Spacewatch | · | 3.0 km | MPC · JPL |
| 401410 | 2013 CT_{65} | — | November 16, 2006 | Mount Lemmon | Mount Lemmon Survey | · | 3.4 km | MPC · JPL |
| 401411 | 2013 CR_{66} | — | September 29, 2005 | Kitt Peak | Spacewatch | · | 2.2 km | MPC · JPL |
| 401412 | 2013 CF_{67} | — | February 25, 2006 | Kitt Peak | Spacewatch | · | 890 m | MPC · JPL |
| 401413 | 2013 CB_{69} | — | January 23, 2006 | Mount Lemmon | Mount Lemmon Survey | · | 870 m | MPC · JPL |
| 401414 | 2013 CD_{70} | — | November 5, 2007 | Mount Lemmon | Mount Lemmon Survey | · | 2.0 km | MPC · JPL |
| 401415 | 2013 CP_{72} | — | June 13, 2005 | Kitt Peak | Spacewatch | · | 1.8 km | MPC · JPL |
| 401416 | 2013 CO_{73} | — | January 13, 1994 | Kitt Peak | Spacewatch | · | 1.4 km | MPC · JPL |
| 401417 | 2013 CP_{74} | — | January 15, 2004 | Kitt Peak | Spacewatch | · | 2.0 km | MPC · JPL |
| 401418 | 2013 CJ_{75} | — | October 18, 1998 | Kitt Peak | Spacewatch | · | 4.4 km | MPC · JPL |
| 401419 | 2013 CP_{77} | — | November 8, 2008 | Mount Lemmon | Mount Lemmon Survey | · | 1.7 km | MPC · JPL |
| 401420 | 2013 CJ_{81} | — | March 11, 2008 | Kitt Peak | Spacewatch | · | 2.5 km | MPC · JPL |
| 401421 | 2013 CM_{81} | — | September 27, 2006 | Kitt Peak | Spacewatch | · | 1.2 km | MPC · JPL |
| 401422 | 2013 CX_{81} | — | December 3, 2007 | Kitt Peak | Spacewatch | · | 2.0 km | MPC · JPL |
| 401423 | 2013 CX_{82} | — | October 15, 2007 | Kitt Peak | Spacewatch | · | 1.1 km | MPC · JPL |
| 401424 | 2013 CR_{85} | — | January 31, 2009 | Mount Lemmon | Mount Lemmon Survey | MRX | 1.2 km | MPC · JPL |
| 401425 | 2013 CB_{86} | — | October 3, 2006 | Mount Lemmon | Mount Lemmon Survey | · | 2.5 km | MPC · JPL |
| 401426 | 2013 CT_{95} | — | January 14, 2008 | Kitt Peak | Spacewatch | · | 2.0 km | MPC · JPL |
| 401427 | 2013 CW_{98} | — | January 14, 2008 | Kitt Peak | Spacewatch | · | 2.1 km | MPC · JPL |
| 401428 | 2013 CO_{101} | — | January 8, 2013 | Mount Lemmon | Mount Lemmon Survey | PAD | 1.8 km | MPC · JPL |
| 401429 | 2013 CE_{104} | — | April 10, 2005 | Kitt Peak | Spacewatch | · | 1.5 km | MPC · JPL |
| 401430 | 2013 CE_{107} | — | October 20, 2011 | Mount Lemmon | Mount Lemmon Survey | · | 2.0 km | MPC · JPL |
| 401431 | 2013 CX_{107} | — | February 4, 2009 | Mount Lemmon | Mount Lemmon Survey | · | 1.0 km | MPC · JPL |
| 401432 | 2013 CS_{108} | — | September 10, 2007 | Mount Lemmon | Mount Lemmon Survey | · | 1.3 km | MPC · JPL |
| 401433 | 2013 CN_{110} | — | March 4, 2008 | Mount Lemmon | Mount Lemmon Survey | · | 2.3 km | MPC · JPL |
| 401434 | 2013 CX_{110} | — | July 20, 1999 | Anderson Mesa | LONEOS | · | 2.7 km | MPC · JPL |
| 401435 | 2013 CL_{111} | — | May 11, 2010 | Mount Lemmon | Mount Lemmon Survey | V | 630 m | MPC · JPL |
| 401436 | 2013 CE_{116} | — | June 9, 2010 | WISE | WISE | · | 3.3 km | MPC · JPL |
| 401437 | 2013 CJ_{122} | — | December 20, 2004 | Mount Lemmon | Mount Lemmon Survey | · | 1.2 km | MPC · JPL |
| 401438 | 2013 CT_{123} | — | March 17, 2009 | Kitt Peak | Spacewatch | · | 1.7 km | MPC · JPL |
| 401439 | 2013 CP_{126} | — | September 6, 2008 | Catalina | CSS | · | 710 m | MPC · JPL |
| 401440 | 2013 CJ_{130} | — | November 9, 2008 | Mount Lemmon | Mount Lemmon Survey | · | 740 m | MPC · JPL |
| 401441 | 2013 CE_{131} | — | September 29, 2005 | Kitt Peak | Spacewatch | · | 2.9 km | MPC · JPL |
| 401442 | 2013 CM_{131} | — | March 3, 2006 | Mount Lemmon | Mount Lemmon Survey | · | 1.1 km | MPC · JPL |
| 401443 | 2013 CH_{132} | — | December 8, 1999 | Kitt Peak | Spacewatch | · | 3.7 km | MPC · JPL |
| 401444 | 2013 CT_{134} | — | December 27, 2006 | Mount Lemmon | Mount Lemmon Survey | · | 3.3 km | MPC · JPL |
| 401445 | 2013 CJ_{135} | — | January 17, 2009 | Kitt Peak | Spacewatch | · | 1.2 km | MPC · JPL |
| 401446 | 2013 CY_{135} | — | January 27, 2010 | WISE | WISE | L4 | 10 km | MPC · JPL |
| 401447 | 2013 CG_{137} | — | January 22, 2013 | Mount Lemmon | Mount Lemmon Survey | · | 1.8 km | MPC · JPL |
| 401448 | 2013 CH_{137} | — | February 21, 2001 | Kitt Peak | Spacewatch | · | 1.2 km | MPC · JPL |
| 401449 | 2013 CJ_{137} | — | January 18, 2009 | Kitt Peak | Spacewatch | · | 1.5 km | MPC · JPL |
| 401450 | 2013 CR_{138} | — | February 5, 2009 | Mount Lemmon | Mount Lemmon Survey | WIT | 1.0 km | MPC · JPL |
| 401451 | 2013 CE_{139} | — | February 25, 2006 | Mount Lemmon | Mount Lemmon Survey | V | 600 m | MPC · JPL |
| 401452 | 2013 CL_{139} | — | January 11, 2008 | Mount Lemmon | Mount Lemmon Survey | · | 2.1 km | MPC · JPL |
| 401453 | 2013 CL_{147} | — | April 2, 2009 | Kitt Peak | Spacewatch | · | 2.7 km | MPC · JPL |
| 401454 | 2013 CE_{152} | — | March 16, 2010 | WISE | WISE | · | 1.5 km | MPC · JPL |
| 401455 | 2013 CL_{156} | — | February 4, 2000 | Kitt Peak | Spacewatch | · | 1.7 km | MPC · JPL |
| 401456 | 2013 CA_{160} | — | October 13, 2005 | Kitt Peak | Spacewatch | EOS | 1.9 km | MPC · JPL |
| 401457 | 2013 CW_{161} | — | January 23, 2006 | Mount Lemmon | Mount Lemmon Survey | V | 760 m | MPC · JPL |
| 401458 | 2013 CM_{162} | — | May 5, 2002 | Socorro | LINEAR | T_{j} (2.99) · EUP | 4.3 km | MPC · JPL |
| 401459 | 2013 CG_{164} | — | December 19, 2007 | Kitt Peak | Spacewatch | · | 1.8 km | MPC · JPL |
| 401460 | 2013 CE_{165} | — | January 25, 2009 | Kitt Peak | Spacewatch | · | 1.2 km | MPC · JPL |
| 401461 | 2013 CJ_{166} | — | April 6, 1994 | Kitt Peak | Spacewatch | · | 2.6 km | MPC · JPL |
| 401462 | 2013 CJ_{169} | — | May 2, 2006 | Mount Lemmon | Mount Lemmon Survey | · | 1.4 km | MPC · JPL |
| 401463 | 2013 CN_{169} | — | April 29, 2003 | Kitt Peak | Spacewatch | · | 1.0 km | MPC · JPL |
| 401464 | 2013 CC_{170} | — | March 16, 2009 | Mount Lemmon | Mount Lemmon Survey | · | 1.3 km | MPC · JPL |
| 401465 | 2013 CP_{172} | — | October 2, 2006 | Mount Lemmon | Mount Lemmon Survey | · | 2.0 km | MPC · JPL |
| 401466 | 2013 CQ_{173} | — | July 2, 1998 | Kitt Peak | Spacewatch | THM | 2.6 km | MPC · JPL |
| 401467 | 2013 CZ_{173} | — | January 7, 2006 | Mount Lemmon | Mount Lemmon Survey | · | 1.3 km | MPC · JPL |
| 401468 | 2013 CS_{174} | — | August 21, 2006 | Kitt Peak | Spacewatch | · | 1.9 km | MPC · JPL |
| 401469 | 2013 CJ_{175} | — | October 31, 2011 | Kitt Peak | Spacewatch | · | 1.2 km | MPC · JPL |
| 401470 | 2013 CE_{182} | — | December 31, 2007 | Kitt Peak | Spacewatch | · | 2.6 km | MPC · JPL |
| 401471 | 2013 CA_{183} | — | November 24, 2008 | Mount Lemmon | Mount Lemmon Survey | · | 1.2 km | MPC · JPL |
| 401472 | 2013 CQ_{183} | — | January 2, 2009 | Kitt Peak | Spacewatch | · | 1.7 km | MPC · JPL |
| 401473 | 2013 CY_{187} | — | February 28, 2008 | Mount Lemmon | Mount Lemmon Survey | EOS | 1.7 km | MPC · JPL |
| 401474 | 2013 CG_{190} | — | October 29, 2005 | Catalina | CSS | · | 810 m | MPC · JPL |
| 401475 | 2013 CE_{192} | — | November 21, 2008 | Mount Lemmon | Mount Lemmon Survey | · | 1.4 km | MPC · JPL |
| 401476 | 2013 CP_{194} | — | November 5, 2007 | Kitt Peak | Spacewatch | · | 1.2 km | MPC · JPL |
| 401477 | 2013 CU_{195} | — | March 21, 2002 | Kitt Peak | Spacewatch | THM | 2.2 km | MPC · JPL |
| 401478 | 2013 CG_{196} | — | January 21, 2002 | Kitt Peak | Spacewatch | EOS | 1.9 km | MPC · JPL |
| 401479 | 2013 CJ_{198} | — | March 12, 2002 | Kitt Peak | Spacewatch | EOS | 2.2 km | MPC · JPL |
| 401480 | 2013 CM_{204} | — | April 14, 2010 | Mount Lemmon | Mount Lemmon Survey | V | 660 m | MPC · JPL |
| 401481 | 2013 CT_{204} | — | March 12, 2008 | Kitt Peak | Spacewatch | THM | 1.9 km | MPC · JPL |
| 401482 | 2013 CQ_{206} | — | October 16, 2007 | Kitt Peak | Spacewatch | · | 1.1 km | MPC · JPL |
| 401483 | 2013 CX_{209} | — | September 24, 2000 | Socorro | LINEAR | V | 700 m | MPC · JPL |
| 401484 | 2013 CW_{210} | — | September 5, 2010 | Mount Lemmon | Mount Lemmon Survey | · | 3.0 km | MPC · JPL |
| 401485 | 2013 DS_{1} | — | February 10, 2002 | Socorro | LINEAR | · | 1.3 km | MPC · JPL |
| 401486 | 2013 DB_{3} | — | April 2, 2005 | Siding Spring | SSS | · | 2.0 km | MPC · JPL |
| 401487 | 2013 DX_{4} | — | March 18, 2004 | Kitt Peak | Spacewatch | AGN | 1.4 km | MPC · JPL |
| 401488 | 2013 DT_{5} | — | November 15, 2007 | Mount Lemmon | Mount Lemmon Survey | · | 1.4 km | MPC · JPL |
| 401489 | 2013 DY_{5} | — | April 25, 2000 | Kitt Peak | Spacewatch | · | 1.8 km | MPC · JPL |
| 401490 | 2013 DV_{8} | — | September 30, 1973 | Palomar | C. J. van Houten, I. van Houten-Groeneveld, T. Gehrels | · | 900 m | MPC · JPL |
| 401491 | 2013 DK_{15} | — | January 23, 2006 | Catalina | CSS | · | 900 m | MPC · JPL |
| 401492 | 2013 DB_{16} | — | December 17, 2003 | Kitt Peak | Spacewatch | EUN | 1.4 km | MPC · JPL |
| 401493 | 2013 DC_{16} | — | September 29, 2003 | Kitt Peak | Spacewatch | · | 1.6 km | MPC · JPL |
| 401494 | 2013 DG_{16} | — | July 17, 2010 | WISE | WISE | LUT | 5.8 km | MPC · JPL |
| 401495 | 2013 EG_{3} | — | August 22, 2004 | Kitt Peak | Spacewatch | V | 580 m | MPC · JPL |
| 401496 | 2013 ER_{10} | — | October 31, 1999 | Kitt Peak | Spacewatch | · | 3.2 km | MPC · JPL |
| 401497 | 2013 EB_{13} | — | December 21, 2006 | Mount Lemmon | Mount Lemmon Survey | · | 3.3 km | MPC · JPL |
| 401498 | 2013 EY_{15} | — | April 8, 2002 | Kitt Peak | Spacewatch | NYS | 1.3 km | MPC · JPL |
| 401499 | 2013 EQ_{18} | — | September 9, 2007 | Kitt Peak | Spacewatch | · | 1.2 km | MPC · JPL |
| 401500 | 2013 EX_{18} | — | February 27, 2006 | Mount Lemmon | Mount Lemmon Survey | · | 920 m | MPC · JPL |

== 401501–401600 ==
back to top

| Designation | | | Discovery | | | Properties | | Ref |
| Permanent | Provisional | Named after | Date | Site | Discoverer(s) | Category | Diam. | Ref |
|---|---|---|---|---|---|---|---|---|
| 401501 | 2013 ER_{24} | — | March 21, 2004 | Kitt Peak | Spacewatch | · | 1.9 km | MPC · JPL |
| 401502 | 2013 ES_{28} | — | September 13, 2007 | Mount Lemmon | Mount Lemmon Survey | PHO | 2.1 km | MPC · JPL |
| 401503 | 2013 EY_{28} | — | April 28, 2009 | Catalina | CSS | · | 1.8 km | MPC · JPL |
| 401504 | 2013 ED_{29} | — | September 18, 2006 | Kitt Peak | Spacewatch | (12739) | 2.1 km | MPC · JPL |
| 401505 | 2013 EW_{30} | — | February 9, 2008 | Mount Lemmon | Mount Lemmon Survey | · | 2.5 km | MPC · JPL |
| 401506 | 2013 ER_{31} | — | December 27, 2006 | Mount Lemmon | Mount Lemmon Survey | · | 2.3 km | MPC · JPL |
| 401507 | 2013 EE_{32} | — | March 10, 2003 | Kitt Peak | Spacewatch | · | 1.9 km | MPC · JPL |
| 401508 | 2013 EM_{33} | — | November 3, 2005 | Mount Lemmon | Mount Lemmon Survey | · | 3.1 km | MPC · JPL |
| 401509 | 2013 EP_{34} | — | January 15, 2007 | Kitt Peak | Spacewatch | · | 1.8 km | MPC · JPL |
| 401510 | 2013 EV_{34} | — | September 12, 2007 | Kitt Peak | Spacewatch | V | 790 m | MPC · JPL |
| 401511 | 2013 EY_{41} | — | February 25, 2006 | Kitt Peak | Spacewatch | · | 740 m | MPC · JPL |
| 401512 | 2013 EO_{51} | — | August 24, 2007 | Kitt Peak | Spacewatch | · | 1.5 km | MPC · JPL |
| 401513 | 2013 EP_{51} | — | June 18, 2005 | Mount Lemmon | Mount Lemmon Survey | · | 1.9 km | MPC · JPL |
| 401514 | 2013 EC_{58} | — | August 28, 2006 | Catalina | CSS | · | 1.5 km | MPC · JPL |
| 401515 | 2013 ES_{58} | — | October 11, 2004 | Kitt Peak | Spacewatch | · | 810 m | MPC · JPL |
| 401516 | 2013 EC_{64} | — | August 18, 2006 | Kitt Peak | Spacewatch | AGN | 1.1 km | MPC · JPL |
| 401517 | 2013 EU_{67} | — | March 15, 2008 | Kitt Peak | Spacewatch | · | 2.4 km | MPC · JPL |
| 401518 | 2013 ES_{68} | — | March 12, 2005 | Kitt Peak | Spacewatch | · | 1.4 km | MPC · JPL |
| 401519 | 2013 EF_{71} | — | September 26, 2006 | Kitt Peak | Spacewatch | · | 1.8 km | MPC · JPL |
| 401520 | 2013 EF_{74} | — | April 2, 2005 | Kitt Peak | Spacewatch | · | 1.1 km | MPC · JPL |
| 401521 | 2013 EW_{74} | — | February 12, 2008 | Kitt Peak | Spacewatch | · | 1.9 km | MPC · JPL |
| 401522 | 2013 EX_{81} | — | October 1, 2003 | Kitt Peak | Spacewatch | · | 1.4 km | MPC · JPL |
| 401523 | 2013 EU_{86} | — | December 19, 2007 | Mount Lemmon | Mount Lemmon Survey | · | 2.1 km | MPC · JPL |
| 401524 | 2013 EJ_{88} | — | February 22, 2004 | Kitt Peak | Spacewatch | · | 2.3 km | MPC · JPL |
| 401525 | 2013 ED_{90} | — | March 16, 2004 | Catalina | CSS | · | 2.2 km | MPC · JPL |
| 401526 | 2013 EG_{90} | — | May 13, 2005 | Kitt Peak | Spacewatch | · | 2.2 km | MPC · JPL |
| 401527 | 2013 ET_{91} | — | January 17, 2007 | Kitt Peak | Spacewatch | · | 3.5 km | MPC · JPL |
| 401528 | 2013 EO_{92} | — | December 22, 2003 | Socorro | LINEAR | · | 1.6 km | MPC · JPL |
| 401529 | 2013 EO_{93} | — | March 29, 2000 | Kitt Peak | Spacewatch | · | 1.4 km | MPC · JPL |
| 401530 | 2013 ES_{93} | — | March 14, 2004 | Socorro | LINEAR | · | 2.1 km | MPC · JPL |
| 401531 | 2013 EQ_{94} | — | November 18, 2007 | Mount Lemmon | Mount Lemmon Survey | · | 2.3 km | MPC · JPL |
| 401532 | 2013 EP_{98} | — | August 21, 2006 | Kitt Peak | Spacewatch | · | 1.3 km | MPC · JPL |
| 401533 | 2013 EJ_{101} | — | February 8, 2007 | Mount Lemmon | Mount Lemmon Survey | · | 3.9 km | MPC · JPL |
| 401534 | 2013 EK_{101} | — | November 2, 2010 | Mount Lemmon | Mount Lemmon Survey | · | 2.7 km | MPC · JPL |
| 401535 | 2013 EY_{102} | — | April 1, 2008 | Kitt Peak | Spacewatch | · | 3.8 km | MPC · JPL |
| 401536 | 2013 ED_{104} | — | March 4, 2000 | Socorro | LINEAR | · | 1.9 km | MPC · JPL |
| 401537 | 2013 EQ_{105} | — | March 18, 2009 | Kitt Peak | Spacewatch | · | 1.5 km | MPC · JPL |
| 401538 | 2013 EO_{108} | — | October 21, 2006 | Mount Lemmon | Mount Lemmon Survey | · | 1.7 km | MPC · JPL |
| 401539 | 2013 EF_{109} | — | October 11, 2007 | Kitt Peak | Spacewatch | · | 1.4 km | MPC · JPL |
| 401540 | 2013 EE_{110} | — | June 19, 1998 | Kitt Peak | Spacewatch | 3:2 · SHU | 6.5 km | MPC · JPL |
| 401541 | 2013 EQ_{110} | — | April 6, 2005 | Catalina | CSS | EUN | 1.5 km | MPC · JPL |
| 401542 | 2013 ER_{110} | — | May 10, 2005 | Mount Lemmon | Mount Lemmon Survey | · | 1.3 km | MPC · JPL |
| 401543 | 2013 EU_{111} | — | August 10, 2010 | Kitt Peak | Spacewatch | · | 2.0 km | MPC · JPL |
| 401544 | 2013 ES_{112} | — | November 19, 2007 | Mount Lemmon | Mount Lemmon Survey | · | 2.6 km | MPC · JPL |
| 401545 | 2013 EG_{115} | — | October 24, 2005 | Kitt Peak | Spacewatch | · | 3.5 km | MPC · JPL |
| 401546 | 2013 ES_{120} | — | February 14, 2004 | Kitt Peak | Spacewatch | · | 1.6 km | MPC · JPL |
| 401547 | 2013 EQ_{122} | — | September 16, 2006 | Kitt Peak | Spacewatch | · | 1.5 km | MPC · JPL |
| 401548 | 2013 EF_{123} | — | April 20, 2006 | Kitt Peak | Spacewatch | · | 1.3 km | MPC · JPL |
| 401549 | 2013 EV_{124} | — | March 28, 2009 | Mount Lemmon | Mount Lemmon Survey | · | 1.9 km | MPC · JPL |
| 401550 | 2013 EK_{125} | — | November 12, 2006 | Mount Lemmon | Mount Lemmon Survey | HOF | 2.1 km | MPC · JPL |
| 401551 | 2013 ES_{125} | — | August 18, 2009 | Kitt Peak | Spacewatch | · | 3.1 km | MPC · JPL |
| 401552 | 2013 EK_{128} | — | April 7, 2003 | Kitt Peak | Spacewatch | EOS | 2.3 km | MPC · JPL |
| 401553 | 2013 EL_{128} | — | March 15, 2004 | Socorro | LINEAR | · | 2.4 km | MPC · JPL |
| 401554 | 2013 EO_{128} | — | April 17, 2008 | Mount Lemmon | Mount Lemmon Survey | · | 3.9 km | MPC · JPL |
| 401555 | 2013 EP_{139} | — | March 13, 2007 | Mount Lemmon | Mount Lemmon Survey | · | 510 m | MPC · JPL |
| 401556 | 2013 FO_{2} | — | October 18, 2006 | Kitt Peak | Spacewatch | · | 2.4 km | MPC · JPL |
| 401557 | 2013 FS_{2} | — | October 24, 2011 | Kitt Peak | Spacewatch | · | 2.0 km | MPC · JPL |
| 401558 | 2013 FB_{3} | — | September 13, 2005 | Catalina | CSS | 615 | 1.8 km | MPC · JPL |
| 401559 | 2013 FL_{3} | — | February 16, 2007 | Catalina | CSS | · | 4.4 km | MPC · JPL |
| 401560 | 2013 FY_{3} | — | August 29, 2006 | Catalina | CSS | · | 1.6 km | MPC · JPL |
| 401561 | 2013 FW_{4} | — | October 16, 2006 | Catalina | CSS | · | 2.2 km | MPC · JPL |
| 401562 | 2013 FG_{5} | — | October 3, 2006 | Mount Lemmon | Mount Lemmon Survey | · | 1.8 km | MPC · JPL |
| 401563 | 2013 FH_{5} | — | April 8, 2006 | Kitt Peak | Spacewatch | · | 1.4 km | MPC · JPL |
| 401564 | 2013 FJ_{5} | — | March 7, 2008 | Mount Lemmon | Mount Lemmon Survey | · | 2.1 km | MPC · JPL |
| 401565 | 2013 FO_{5} | — | February 20, 2009 | Mount Lemmon | Mount Lemmon Survey | EUN | 1.1 km | MPC · JPL |
| 401566 | 2013 FX_{5} | — | June 13, 2005 | Mount Lemmon | Mount Lemmon Survey | · | 3.5 km | MPC · JPL |
| 401567 | 2013 FW_{7} | — | August 29, 2009 | Kitt Peak | Spacewatch | · | 2.7 km | MPC · JPL |
| 401568 | 2013 FM_{8} | — | January 15, 2009 | Kitt Peak | Spacewatch | PHO | 1 km | MPC · JPL |
| 401569 | 2013 FD_{13} | — | January 2, 2012 | Kitt Peak | Spacewatch | · | 3.8 km | MPC · JPL |
| 401570 | 2013 FB_{15} | — | April 18, 2009 | Kitt Peak | Spacewatch | · | 1.9 km | MPC · JPL |
| 401571 | 2013 FY_{15} | — | November 23, 2006 | Kitt Peak | Spacewatch | · | 1.8 km | MPC · JPL |
| 401572 | 2013 FJ_{17} | — | February 10, 2002 | Socorro | LINEAR | · | 2.1 km | MPC · JPL |
| 401573 | 2013 FN_{17} | — | November 5, 2007 | Kitt Peak | Spacewatch | NYS | 1.4 km | MPC · JPL |
| 401574 | 2013 FN_{20} | — | August 28, 2005 | Kitt Peak | Spacewatch | KOR | 1.7 km | MPC · JPL |
| 401575 | 2013 FQ_{24} | — | April 14, 2005 | Kitt Peak | Spacewatch | · | 2.9 km | MPC · JPL |
| 401576 | 2013 FC_{25} | — | October 21, 2006 | Kitt Peak | Spacewatch | AGN | 1.3 km | MPC · JPL |
| 401577 | 2013 FG_{25} | — | August 12, 2010 | Kitt Peak | Spacewatch | · | 3.4 km | MPC · JPL |
| 401578 | 2013 FY_{25} | — | December 18, 2001 | Socorro | LINEAR | · | 990 m | MPC · JPL |
| 401579 | 2013 FE_{26} | — | April 11, 2008 | Kitt Peak | Spacewatch | · | 4.4 km | MPC · JPL |
| 401580 | 2013 FM_{27} | — | February 21, 2007 | Kitt Peak | Spacewatch | THM | 2.4 km | MPC · JPL |
| 401581 | 2013 FP_{27} | — | May 29, 2003 | Kitt Peak | Spacewatch | · | 3.5 km | MPC · JPL |
| 401582 | 2013 FV_{27} | — | October 14, 2007 | Mount Lemmon | Mount Lemmon Survey | · | 1.5 km | MPC · JPL |
| 401583 | 2013 GO_{1} | — | November 21, 2006 | Mount Lemmon | Mount Lemmon Survey | · | 2.5 km | MPC · JPL |
| 401584 | 2013 GP_{1} | — | May 25, 2006 | Kitt Peak | Spacewatch | · | 1.4 km | MPC · JPL |
| 401585 | 2013 GS_{3} | — | September 15, 2004 | Kitt Peak | Spacewatch | · | 2.8 km | MPC · JPL |
| 401586 | 2013 GM_{4} | — | November 1, 2005 | Mount Lemmon | Mount Lemmon Survey | THM | 2.9 km | MPC · JPL |
| 401587 | 2013 GT_{6} | — | October 4, 2004 | Kitt Peak | Spacewatch | EOS | 2.4 km | MPC · JPL |
| 401588 | 2013 GL_{9} | — | September 10, 2004 | Kitt Peak | Spacewatch | · | 2.3 km | MPC · JPL |
| 401589 | 2013 GM_{9} | — | March 17, 2004 | Kitt Peak | Spacewatch | · | 1.9 km | MPC · JPL |
| 401590 | 2013 GT_{9} | — | November 18, 2006 | Kitt Peak | Spacewatch | AGN | 1.5 km | MPC · JPL |
| 401591 | 2013 GD_{10} | — | August 28, 2005 | Kitt Peak | Spacewatch | · | 2.0 km | MPC · JPL |
| 401592 | 2013 GG_{10} | — | November 16, 2006 | Kitt Peak | Spacewatch | AGN | 1.3 km | MPC · JPL |
| 401593 | 2013 GO_{14} | — | February 12, 2004 | Kitt Peak | Spacewatch | · | 2.9 km | MPC · JPL |
| 401594 | 2013 GH_{15} | — | February 8, 2000 | Kitt Peak | Spacewatch | · | 1.3 km | MPC · JPL |
| 401595 | 2013 GN_{20} | — | March 10, 2007 | Mount Lemmon | Mount Lemmon Survey | · | 3.4 km | MPC · JPL |
| 401596 | 2013 GY_{20} | — | July 14, 2010 | WISE | WISE | · | 4.2 km | MPC · JPL |
| 401597 | 2013 GY_{21} | — | September 11, 2004 | Kitt Peak | Spacewatch | · | 3.3 km | MPC · JPL |
| 401598 | 2013 GL_{22} | — | March 6, 2008 | Mount Lemmon | Mount Lemmon Survey | · | 2.4 km | MPC · JPL |
| 401599 | 2013 GO_{24} | — | January 14, 2012 | Mount Lemmon | Mount Lemmon Survey | · | 4.8 km | MPC · JPL |
| 401600 | 2013 GZ_{24} | — | December 18, 2001 | Socorro | LINEAR | (2076) | 970 m | MPC · JPL |

== 401601–401700 ==
back to top

| Designation | | | Discovery | | | Properties | | Ref |
| Permanent | Provisional | Named after | Date | Site | Discoverer(s) | Category | Diam. | Ref |
|---|---|---|---|---|---|---|---|---|
| 401601 | 2013 GP_{25} | — | December 24, 2006 | Kitt Peak | Spacewatch | · | 2.3 km | MPC · JPL |
| 401602 | 2013 GT_{25} | — | November 13, 2006 | Catalina | CSS | · | 2.9 km | MPC · JPL |
| 401603 | 2013 GX_{25} | — | November 21, 2006 | Mount Lemmon | Mount Lemmon Survey | EOS | 2.2 km | MPC · JPL |
| 401604 | 2013 GB_{26} | — | April 13, 2004 | Catalina | CSS | · | 2.5 km | MPC · JPL |
| 401605 | 2013 GV_{26} | — | October 11, 2007 | Catalina | CSS | · | 1.6 km | MPC · JPL |
| 401606 | 2013 GW_{26} | — | September 19, 2006 | Catalina | CSS | · | 3.2 km | MPC · JPL |
| 401607 | 2013 GV_{27} | — | November 26, 2005 | Catalina | CSS | EOS | 2.6 km | MPC · JPL |
| 401608 | 2013 GD_{30} | — | December 29, 2011 | Mount Lemmon | Mount Lemmon Survey | · | 2.9 km | MPC · JPL |
| 401609 | 2013 GH_{32} | — | April 10, 2005 | Mount Lemmon | Mount Lemmon Survey | · | 1.5 km | MPC · JPL |
| 401610 | 2013 GR_{32} | — | September 5, 1996 | Kitt Peak | Spacewatch | · | 2.2 km | MPC · JPL |
| 401611 | 2013 GO_{34} | — | July 29, 2010 | WISE | WISE | · | 3.8 km | MPC · JPL |
| 401612 | 2013 GV_{37} | — | May 11, 2010 | WISE | WISE | · | 1.3 km | MPC · JPL |
| 401613 | 2013 GJ_{38} | — | March 5, 2008 | Kitt Peak | Spacewatch | · | 2.0 km | MPC · JPL |
| 401614 | 2013 GP_{42} | — | March 23, 2006 | Kitt Peak | Spacewatch | · | 890 m | MPC · JPL |
| 401615 | 2013 GS_{43} | — | April 24, 2004 | Kitt Peak | Spacewatch | · | 2.3 km | MPC · JPL |
| 401616 | 2013 GK_{50} | — | April 28, 2004 | Kitt Peak | Spacewatch | AGN | 1.1 km | MPC · JPL |
| 401617 | 2013 GA_{52} | — | November 3, 2010 | Kitt Peak | Spacewatch | · | 4.4 km | MPC · JPL |
| 401618 | 2013 GK_{53} | — | January 10, 2006 | Mount Lemmon | Mount Lemmon Survey | · | 3.7 km | MPC · JPL |
| 401619 | 2013 GK_{54} | — | December 30, 2005 | Kitt Peak | Spacewatch | · | 3.1 km | MPC · JPL |
| 401620 | 2013 GU_{54} | — | October 29, 2010 | Kitt Peak | Spacewatch | · | 3.5 km | MPC · JPL |
| 401621 | 2013 GQ_{56} | — | October 27, 1995 | Kitt Peak | Spacewatch | · | 1.5 km | MPC · JPL |
| 401622 | 2013 GC_{57} | — | March 19, 1996 | Kitt Peak | Spacewatch | · | 1.5 km | MPC · JPL |
| 401623 | 2013 GZ_{58} | — | April 2, 2006 | Kitt Peak | Spacewatch | · | 880 m | MPC · JPL |
| 401624 | 2013 GD_{61} | — | February 21, 2007 | Mount Lemmon | Mount Lemmon Survey | HYG | 2.4 km | MPC · JPL |
| 401625 | 2013 GQ_{62} | — | December 29, 2011 | Kitt Peak | Spacewatch | · | 3.6 km | MPC · JPL |
| 401626 | 2013 GZ_{66} | — | October 25, 2005 | Kitt Peak | Spacewatch | · | 3.2 km | MPC · JPL |
| 401627 | 2013 GJ_{67} | — | September 11, 2007 | Mount Lemmon | Mount Lemmon Survey | · | 1.3 km | MPC · JPL |
| 401628 | 2013 GT_{70} | — | February 6, 2007 | Mount Lemmon | Mount Lemmon Survey | · | 1.9 km | MPC · JPL |
| 401629 | 2013 GU_{72} | — | October 1, 2005 | Kitt Peak | Spacewatch | AGN | 1.5 km | MPC · JPL |
| 401630 | 2013 GP_{73} | — | November 7, 2007 | Kitt Peak | Spacewatch | · | 1.5 km | MPC · JPL |
| 401631 | 2013 GF_{74} | — | April 9, 2003 | Kitt Peak | Spacewatch | · | 2.3 km | MPC · JPL |
| 401632 | 2013 GD_{75} | — | April 14, 2008 | Kitt Peak | Spacewatch | · | 2.1 km | MPC · JPL |
| 401633 | 2013 GR_{81} | — | October 8, 2004 | Kitt Peak | Spacewatch | · | 3.2 km | MPC · JPL |
| 401634 | 2013 GA_{82} | — | February 2, 2000 | Prescott | P. G. Comba | MAR | 1.4 km | MPC · JPL |
| 401635 | 2013 GO_{82} | — | March 31, 2009 | Mount Lemmon | Mount Lemmon Survey | EUN | 1.2 km | MPC · JPL |
| 401636 | 2013 GW_{83} | — | December 27, 2006 | Mount Lemmon | Mount Lemmon Survey | · | 3.4 km | MPC · JPL |
| 401637 | 2013 GY_{83} | — | September 30, 2006 | Mount Lemmon | Mount Lemmon Survey | (13314) | 2.2 km | MPC · JPL |
| 401638 | 2013 GQ_{85} | — | September 17, 2009 | Mount Lemmon | Mount Lemmon Survey | · | 3.5 km | MPC · JPL |
| 401639 | 2013 GL_{91} | — | March 13, 2007 | Kitt Peak | Spacewatch | · | 3.3 km | MPC · JPL |
| 401640 | 2013 GA_{92} | — | September 17, 2006 | Catalina | CSS | · | 2.5 km | MPC · JPL |
| 401641 | 2013 GB_{92} | — | November 13, 1999 | Kitt Peak | Spacewatch | TIR | 4.0 km | MPC · JPL |
| 401642 | 2013 GW_{92} | — | January 21, 2001 | Socorro | LINEAR | LIX | 5.5 km | MPC · JPL |
| 401643 | 2013 GL_{93} | — | March 16, 2009 | Kitt Peak | Spacewatch | MAR | 1.1 km | MPC · JPL |
| 401644 | 2013 GF_{94} | — | January 9, 2002 | Socorro | LINEAR | · | 1.2 km | MPC · JPL |
| 401645 | 2013 GF_{96} | — | October 7, 2010 | Mount Lemmon | Mount Lemmon Survey | EOS | 2.6 km | MPC · JPL |
| 401646 | 2013 GV_{97} | — | October 23, 2006 | Kitt Peak | Spacewatch | · | 2.2 km | MPC · JPL |
| 401647 | 2013 GA_{98} | — | February 10, 2007 | Catalina | CSS | · | 3.6 km | MPC · JPL |
| 401648 | 2013 GO_{98} | — | September 11, 2004 | Kitt Peak | Spacewatch | · | 3.0 km | MPC · JPL |
| 401649 | 2013 GN_{100} | — | December 3, 2010 | Mount Lemmon | Mount Lemmon Survey | · | 2.7 km | MPC · JPL |
| 401650 | 2013 GN_{101} | — | November 3, 2010 | Kitt Peak | Spacewatch | · | 4.5 km | MPC · JPL |
| 401651 | 2013 GY_{102} | — | December 21, 2003 | Socorro | LINEAR | RAF | 970 m | MPC · JPL |
| 401652 | 2013 GO_{104} | — | December 1, 2003 | Kitt Peak | Spacewatch | · | 1.1 km | MPC · JPL |
| 401653 | 2013 GA_{105} | — | September 17, 2006 | Kitt Peak | Spacewatch | MAR | 1.0 km | MPC · JPL |
| 401654 | 2013 GS_{105} | — | November 24, 2006 | Mount Lemmon | Mount Lemmon Survey | · | 4.2 km | MPC · JPL |
| 401655 | 2013 GX_{107} | — | March 14, 2007 | Mount Lemmon | Mount Lemmon Survey | HYG | 3.6 km | MPC · JPL |
| 401656 | 2013 GR_{109} | — | January 17, 2007 | Kitt Peak | Spacewatch | · | 2.7 km | MPC · JPL |
| 401657 | 2013 GX_{109} | — | March 21, 2004 | Kitt Peak | Spacewatch | · | 1.9 km | MPC · JPL |
| 401658 | 2013 GG_{111} | — | March 9, 2007 | Catalina | CSS | · | 3.4 km | MPC · JPL |
| 401659 | 2013 GM_{111} | — | February 13, 2001 | Kitt Peak | Spacewatch | EOS | 2.7 km | MPC · JPL |
| 401660 | 2013 GK_{112} | — | October 13, 2010 | Mount Lemmon | Mount Lemmon Survey | TIR | 3.4 km | MPC · JPL |
| 401661 | 2013 GN_{112} | — | December 26, 2005 | Kitt Peak | Spacewatch | · | 4.1 km | MPC · JPL |
| 401662 | 2013 GO_{112} | — | October 25, 2005 | Mount Lemmon | Mount Lemmon Survey | · | 2.5 km | MPC · JPL |
| 401663 | 2013 GC_{113} | — | November 4, 1999 | Kitt Peak | Spacewatch | · | 3.2 km | MPC · JPL |
| 401664 | 2013 GP_{113} | — | October 10, 2005 | Catalina | CSS | · | 2.9 km | MPC · JPL |
| 401665 | 2013 GV_{115} | — | February 4, 2006 | Kitt Peak | Spacewatch | · | 720 m | MPC · JPL |
| 401666 | 2013 GD_{117} | — | December 5, 2002 | Kitt Peak | Spacewatch | · | 2.0 km | MPC · JPL |
| 401667 | 2013 GX_{118} | — | September 23, 2004 | Kitt Peak | Spacewatch | · | 2.9 km | MPC · JPL |
| 401668 | 2013 GX_{119} | — | October 7, 2004 | Kitt Peak | Spacewatch | · | 2.2 km | MPC · JPL |
| 401669 | 2013 GO_{120} | — | November 23, 2006 | Kitt Peak | Spacewatch | · | 2.1 km | MPC · JPL |
| 401670 | 2013 GX_{121} | — | October 10, 2004 | Kitt Peak | Spacewatch | · | 3.4 km | MPC · JPL |
| 401671 | 2013 GB_{122} | — | October 3, 1999 | Kitt Peak | Spacewatch | EOS | 1.8 km | MPC · JPL |
| 401672 | 2013 GJ_{125} | — | December 28, 2005 | Kitt Peak | Spacewatch | · | 3.1 km | MPC · JPL |
| 401673 | 2013 GO_{130} | — | November 1, 2006 | Mount Lemmon | Mount Lemmon Survey | · | 2.5 km | MPC · JPL |
| 401674 | 2013 GZ_{130} | — | December 20, 2007 | Kitt Peak | Spacewatch | · | 1.4 km | MPC · JPL |
| 401675 | 2013 GF_{131} | — | February 27, 2007 | Kitt Peak | Spacewatch | · | 3.5 km | MPC · JPL |
| 401676 | 2013 GY_{131} | — | April 6, 2005 | Mount Lemmon | Mount Lemmon Survey | · | 1.8 km | MPC · JPL |
| 401677 | 2013 GU_{132} | — | January 6, 2012 | Kitt Peak | Spacewatch | 3:2 | 4.3 km | MPC · JPL |
| 401678 | 2013 GA_{133} | — | October 5, 2004 | Kitt Peak | Spacewatch | · | 3.0 km | MPC · JPL |
| 401679 | 2013 GF_{134} | — | November 14, 1998 | Kitt Peak | Spacewatch | · | 1.5 km | MPC · JPL |
| 401680 | 2013 GQ_{134} | — | March 29, 2008 | Kitt Peak | Spacewatch | · | 1.7 km | MPC · JPL |
| 401681 | 2013 HF_{3} | — | December 4, 2010 | Mount Lemmon | Mount Lemmon Survey | · | 3.4 km | MPC · JPL |
| 401682 | 2013 HL_{5} | — | January 2, 2012 | Mount Lemmon | Mount Lemmon Survey | · | 2.7 km | MPC · JPL |
| 401683 | 2013 HF_{8} | — | November 2, 2010 | Mount Lemmon | Mount Lemmon Survey | HYG | 2.6 km | MPC · JPL |
| 401684 | 2013 HF_{9} | — | November 5, 2007 | Mount Lemmon | Mount Lemmon Survey | · | 1.7 km | MPC · JPL |
| 401685 | 2013 HL_{10} | — | January 2, 2012 | Mount Lemmon | Mount Lemmon Survey | · | 3.6 km | MPC · JPL |
| 401686 | 2013 HB_{12} | — | March 11, 2007 | Kitt Peak | Spacewatch | · | 3.1 km | MPC · JPL |
| 401687 | 2013 HJ_{13} | — | April 13, 2008 | Mount Lemmon | Mount Lemmon Survey | · | 2.1 km | MPC · JPL |
| 401688 | 2013 HW_{13} | — | February 27, 2007 | Kitt Peak | Spacewatch | · | 2.9 km | MPC · JPL |
| 401689 | 2013 HG_{15} | — | October 12, 1996 | Kitt Peak | Spacewatch | BRA | 2.0 km | MPC · JPL |
| 401690 | 2013 HP_{17} | — | April 1, 2008 | Kitt Peak | Spacewatch | · | 1.6 km | MPC · JPL |
| 401691 | 2013 HJ_{18} | — | December 5, 2005 | Kitt Peak | Spacewatch | THM | 2.5 km | MPC · JPL |
| 401692 | 2013 HT_{20} | — | December 3, 2010 | Mount Lemmon | Mount Lemmon Survey | · | 3.2 km | MPC · JPL |
| 401693 | 2013 HF_{22} | — | September 16, 2010 | Mount Lemmon | Mount Lemmon Survey | · | 3.0 km | MPC · JPL |
| 401694 | 2013 HG_{23} | — | April 15, 2002 | Kitt Peak | Spacewatch | EOS | 2.7 km | MPC · JPL |
| 401695 | 2013 HW_{23} | — | February 12, 2008 | Mount Lemmon | Mount Lemmon Survey | · | 2.5 km | MPC · JPL |
| 401696 | 2013 HP_{26} | — | December 5, 2005 | Mount Lemmon | Mount Lemmon Survey | · | 2.9 km | MPC · JPL |
| 401697 | 2013 HN_{28} | — | December 22, 2005 | Kitt Peak | Spacewatch | · | 4.2 km | MPC · JPL |
| 401698 | 2013 HO_{30} | — | November 26, 2005 | Mount Lemmon | Mount Lemmon Survey | · | 2.2 km | MPC · JPL |
| 401699 | 2013 HX_{30} | — | October 4, 2006 | Mount Lemmon | Mount Lemmon Survey | WIT | 1.1 km | MPC · JPL |
| 401700 | 2013 HN_{33} | — | November 18, 2006 | Mount Lemmon | Mount Lemmon Survey | · | 2.0 km | MPC · JPL |

== 401701–401800 ==
back to top

| Designation | | | Discovery | | | Properties | | Ref |
| Permanent | Provisional | Named after | Date | Site | Discoverer(s) | Category | Diam. | Ref |
|---|---|---|---|---|---|---|---|---|
| 401701 | 2013 HA_{36} | — | October 17, 2010 | Mount Lemmon | Mount Lemmon Survey | · | 2.8 km | MPC · JPL |
| 401702 | 2013 HL_{39} | — | October 29, 2010 | Mount Lemmon | Mount Lemmon Survey | · | 2.1 km | MPC · JPL |
| 401703 | 2013 HB_{40} | — | May 27, 2008 | Kitt Peak | Spacewatch | · | 3.1 km | MPC · JPL |
| 401704 | 2013 HW_{44} | — | September 16, 2010 | Kitt Peak | Spacewatch | · | 2.0 km | MPC · JPL |
| 401705 | 2013 HT_{48} | — | November 12, 1999 | Kitt Peak | Spacewatch | · | 2.5 km | MPC · JPL |
| 401706 | 2013 HH_{60} | — | January 18, 2008 | Kitt Peak | Spacewatch | · | 1.2 km | MPC · JPL |
| 401707 | 2013 HC_{68} | — | August 21, 2006 | Kitt Peak | Spacewatch | · | 1.1 km | MPC · JPL |
| 401708 | 2013 HA_{69} | — | October 14, 2001 | Socorro | LINEAR | · | 1.9 km | MPC · JPL |
| 401709 | 2013 HH_{69} | — | September 19, 1995 | Kitt Peak | Spacewatch | · | 1.4 km | MPC · JPL |
| 401710 | 2013 HM_{79} | — | January 27, 2007 | Kitt Peak | Spacewatch | · | 2.9 km | MPC · JPL |
| 401711 | 2013 HD_{95} | — | April 4, 2003 | Kitt Peak | Spacewatch | KOR | 1.4 km | MPC · JPL |
| 401712 | 2013 HU_{106} | — | September 5, 2010 | Mount Lemmon | Mount Lemmon Survey | EOS | 2.1 km | MPC · JPL |
| 401713 | 2013 HP_{114} | — | September 15, 2010 | Kitt Peak | Spacewatch | · | 2.2 km | MPC · JPL |
| 401714 | 2013 HA_{116} | — | October 18, 1998 | Kitt Peak | Spacewatch | · | 1.2 km | MPC · JPL |
| 401715 | 2013 HS_{116} | — | December 4, 2005 | Kitt Peak | Spacewatch | · | 2.3 km | MPC · JPL |
| 401716 | 2013 HY_{117} | — | March 10, 2005 | Mount Lemmon | Mount Lemmon Survey | NYS | 1.4 km | MPC · JPL |
| 401717 | 2013 HM_{118} | — | September 30, 2010 | Mount Lemmon | Mount Lemmon Survey | AGN | 1.1 km | MPC · JPL |
| 401718 | 2013 HB_{119} | — | March 31, 2008 | Mount Lemmon | Mount Lemmon Survey | KOR | 1.2 km | MPC · JPL |
| 401719 | 2013 HB_{122} | — | March 26, 2008 | Mount Lemmon | Mount Lemmon Survey | KOR | 1.1 km | MPC · JPL |
| 401720 | 2013 HK_{122} | — | April 9, 2008 | Kitt Peak | Spacewatch | KOR | 1.2 km | MPC · JPL |
| 401721 | 2013 HH_{133} | — | April 26, 2008 | Mount Lemmon | Mount Lemmon Survey | · | 2.0 km | MPC · JPL |
| 401722 | 2013 HH_{146} | — | April 5, 2005 | Mount Lemmon | Mount Lemmon Survey | · | 990 m | MPC · JPL |
| 401723 | 2013 JD_{3} | — | November 11, 2005 | Kitt Peak | Spacewatch | · | 2.4 km | MPC · JPL |
| 401724 | 2013 JR_{3} | — | September 18, 2009 | Kitt Peak | Spacewatch | · | 3.9 km | MPC · JPL |
| 401725 | 2013 JS_{3} | — | November 28, 2005 | Kitt Peak | Spacewatch | · | 3.7 km | MPC · JPL |
| 401726 | 2013 JG_{4} | — | December 14, 2004 | Socorro | LINEAR | VER | 3.9 km | MPC · JPL |
| 401727 | 2013 JR_{4} | — | October 8, 2004 | Kitt Peak | Spacewatch | · | 3.7 km | MPC · JPL |
| 401728 | 2013 JE_{9} | — | October 19, 2011 | Kitt Peak | Spacewatch | · | 1.6 km | MPC · JPL |
| 401729 | 2013 JZ_{14} | — | December 17, 2006 | Mount Lemmon | Mount Lemmon Survey | · | 2.4 km | MPC · JPL |
| 401730 | 2013 JF_{16} | — | November 16, 1999 | Kitt Peak | Spacewatch | · | 2.9 km | MPC · JPL |
| 401731 | 2013 JH_{20} | — | August 30, 2005 | Kitt Peak | Spacewatch | AGN | 1.3 km | MPC · JPL |
| 401732 | 2013 JD_{23} | — | April 18, 2002 | Kitt Peak | Spacewatch | THM | 2.9 km | MPC · JPL |
| 401733 | 2013 JX_{23} | — | March 20, 2007 | Catalina | CSS | · | 4.2 km | MPC · JPL |
| 401734 | 2013 JW_{24} | — | January 27, 2006 | Kitt Peak | Spacewatch | · | 3.2 km | MPC · JPL |
| 401735 | 2013 JE_{26} | — | February 26, 2007 | Mount Lemmon | Mount Lemmon Survey | LUT | 5.6 km | MPC · JPL |
| 401736 | 2013 JK_{32} | — | September 28, 2003 | Socorro | LINEAR | · | 3.7 km | MPC · JPL |
| 401737 | 2013 JB_{33} | — | November 18, 2006 | Mount Lemmon | Mount Lemmon Survey | WIT | 1.1 km | MPC · JPL |
| 401738 | 2013 JB_{35} | — | November 29, 2005 | Mount Lemmon | Mount Lemmon Survey | · | 3.0 km | MPC · JPL |
| 401739 | 2013 JN_{35} | — | December 3, 2010 | Mount Lemmon | Mount Lemmon Survey | ELF | 4.8 km | MPC · JPL |
| 401740 | 2013 JP_{37} | — | November 28, 2006 | Kitt Peak | Spacewatch | · | 4.0 km | MPC · JPL |
| 401741 | 2013 JZ_{42} | — | November 16, 1999 | Kitt Peak | Spacewatch | EOS | 2.4 km | MPC · JPL |
| 401742 | 2013 JE_{43} | — | October 15, 2004 | Kitt Peak | Spacewatch | · | 2.7 km | MPC · JPL |
| 401743 | 2013 JM_{50} | — | October 5, 2004 | Kitt Peak | Spacewatch | · | 2.5 km | MPC · JPL |
| 401744 | 2013 JN_{51} | — | August 29, 2005 | Kitt Peak | Spacewatch | · | 2.3 km | MPC · JPL |
| 401745 | 2013 JV_{51} | — | December 5, 2007 | Mount Lemmon | Mount Lemmon Survey | · | 1.4 km | MPC · JPL |
| 401746 | 2013 JL_{53} | — | October 9, 2004 | Kitt Peak | Spacewatch | · | 3.0 km | MPC · JPL |
| 401747 | 2013 JU_{54} | — | December 30, 2005 | Mount Lemmon | Mount Lemmon Survey | · | 2.6 km | MPC · JPL |
| 401748 | 2013 JT_{57} | — | December 30, 2005 | Kitt Peak | Spacewatch | · | 2.9 km | MPC · JPL |
| 401749 | 2013 JY_{58} | — | October 1, 2005 | Kitt Peak | Spacewatch | KOR | 1.5 km | MPC · JPL |
| 401750 | 2013 JE_{59} | — | October 12, 2010 | Mount Lemmon | Mount Lemmon Survey | · | 1.9 km | MPC · JPL |
| 401751 | 2013 JM_{60} | — | October 28, 2010 | Mount Lemmon | Mount Lemmon Survey | · | 3.4 km | MPC · JPL |
| 401752 | 2013 JW_{60} | — | September 19, 2003 | Kitt Peak | Spacewatch | · | 3.0 km | MPC · JPL |
| 401753 | 2013 JO_{61} | — | October 29, 2010 | Kitt Peak | Spacewatch | TEL | 1.7 km | MPC · JPL |
| 401754 | 2013 JN_{62} | — | December 6, 2005 | Kitt Peak | Spacewatch | · | 3.0 km | MPC · JPL |
| 401755 | 2013 KL | — | October 28, 1994 | Kitt Peak | Spacewatch | · | 2.0 km | MPC · JPL |
| 401756 | 2013 KW_{3} | — | March 16, 2007 | Kitt Peak | Spacewatch | · | 3.2 km | MPC · JPL |
| 401757 | 2013 KV_{4} | — | October 15, 2004 | Mount Lemmon | Mount Lemmon Survey | · | 2.5 km | MPC · JPL |
| 401758 | 2013 KY_{6} | — | November 11, 2007 | Mount Lemmon | Mount Lemmon Survey | · | 1.3 km | MPC · JPL |
| 401759 | 2013 KQ_{9} | — | November 6, 2010 | Mount Lemmon | Mount Lemmon Survey | · | 2.0 km | MPC · JPL |
| 401760 | 2013 KY_{12} | — | November 19, 2004 | Catalina | CSS | · | 3.8 km | MPC · JPL |
| 401761 | 2013 KM_{16} | — | December 29, 2005 | Kitt Peak | Spacewatch | · | 3.7 km | MPC · JPL |
| 401762 | 2013 LJ | — | February 1, 2006 | Kitt Peak | Spacewatch | · | 3.2 km | MPC · JPL |
| 401763 | 2013 LG_{4} | — | April 24, 2007 | Kitt Peak | Spacewatch | · | 5.8 km | MPC · JPL |
| 401764 | 2013 LV_{11} | — | September 17, 2003 | Kitt Peak | Spacewatch | · | 3.5 km | MPC · JPL |
| 401765 | 2013 LM_{18} | — | January 7, 2006 | Mount Lemmon | Mount Lemmon Survey | VER | 4.8 km | MPC · JPL |
| 401766 | 2013 LY_{18} | — | October 14, 1998 | Kitt Peak | Spacewatch | · | 3.3 km | MPC · JPL |
| 401767 | 2013 LN_{25} | — | November 9, 2004 | Catalina | CSS | · | 3.9 km | MPC · JPL |
| 401768 | 2013 MK_{1} | — | December 22, 2000 | Kitt Peak | Spacewatch | · | 2.9 km | MPC · JPL |
| 401769 | 2013 MR_{7} | — | October 16, 2009 | Catalina | CSS | · | 4.0 km | MPC · JPL |
| 401770 | 2013 UX_{11} | — | July 5, 2000 | Anderson Mesa | LONEOS | (5) | 1.7 km | MPC · JPL |
| 401771 | 2014 BN_{43} | — | November 17, 2006 | Kitt Peak | Spacewatch | · | 7.6 km | MPC · JPL |
| 401772 | 2014 CU_{15} | — | March 7, 2003 | Socorro | LINEAR | · | 3.9 km | MPC · JPL |
| 401773 | 2014 CG_{19} | — | March 9, 2005 | Catalina | CSS | · | 2.7 km | MPC · JPL |
| 401774 | 2014 DS_{19} | — | March 30, 2003 | Kitt Peak | Spacewatch | THM | 2.6 km | MPC · JPL |
| 401775 | 2014 DK_{31} | — | February 2, 2005 | Kitt Peak | Spacewatch | · | 2.0 km | MPC · JPL |
| 401776 | 2014 DU_{66} | — | September 21, 2007 | XuYi | PMO NEO Survey Program | · | 2.3 km | MPC · JPL |
| 401777 | 2014 DH_{123} | — | March 11, 2005 | Mount Lemmon | Mount Lemmon Survey | EUN | 1.3 km | MPC · JPL |
| 401778 | 2014 DW_{140} | — | June 8, 2004 | Kitt Peak | Spacewatch | · | 2.6 km | MPC · JPL |
| 401779 | 2014 EJ_{12} | — | September 5, 2007 | Catalina | CSS | · | 1.6 km | MPC · JPL |
| 401780 | 2014 ET_{19} | — | September 4, 2007 | Catalina | CSS | · | 1.8 km | MPC · JPL |
| 401781 | 2014 EM_{23} | — | September 28, 2006 | Mount Lemmon | Mount Lemmon Survey | · | 5.5 km | MPC · JPL |
| 401782 | 2014 FZ_{1} | — | March 3, 2009 | Catalina | CSS | · | 3.0 km | MPC · JPL |
| 401783 | 2014 FA_{13} | — | November 11, 2007 | Mount Lemmon | Mount Lemmon Survey | · | 3.1 km | MPC · JPL |
| 401784 | 2014 FP_{23} | — | October 11, 2007 | Mount Lemmon | Mount Lemmon Survey | · | 2.4 km | MPC · JPL |
| 401785 | 2014 FW_{41} | — | December 18, 2000 | Kitt Peak | Spacewatch | · | 1.5 km | MPC · JPL |
| 401786 | 2014 FS_{46} | — | March 14, 2007 | Mount Lemmon | Mount Lemmon Survey | · | 810 m | MPC · JPL |
| 401787 | 2014 FY_{53} | — | April 14, 2004 | Kitt Peak | Spacewatch | · | 760 m | MPC · JPL |
| 401788 | 2014 FB_{54} | — | July 21, 2004 | Siding Spring | SSS | T_{j} (2.97) | 4.9 km | MPC · JPL |
| 401789 | 2014 FU_{57} | — | February 20, 2001 | Socorro | LINEAR | · | 1.4 km | MPC · JPL |
| 401790 | 2014 GF_{18} | — | March 23, 2003 | Kitt Peak | Spacewatch | MAS | 700 m | MPC · JPL |
| 401791 | 2014 GA_{28} | — | September 21, 2001 | Socorro | LINEAR | V | 870 m | MPC · JPL |
| 401792 | 2014 GM_{32} | — | April 7, 2003 | Kitt Peak | Spacewatch | · | 3.3 km | MPC · JPL |
| 401793 | 2014 HS_{1} | — | October 4, 2004 | Kitt Peak | Spacewatch | · | 1.3 km | MPC · JPL |
| 401794 | 2014 HF_{10} | — | April 18, 2005 | Kitt Peak | Spacewatch | · | 1.7 km | MPC · JPL |
| 401795 | 2014 HK_{13} | — | February 17, 2010 | Kitt Peak | Spacewatch | · | 1.0 km | MPC · JPL |
| 401796 | 2014 HS_{22} | — | January 16, 2008 | Mount Lemmon | Mount Lemmon Survey | · | 3.5 km | MPC · JPL |
| 401797 | 2014 HP_{26} | — | February 13, 2010 | Kitt Peak | Spacewatch | EUN | 1.6 km | MPC · JPL |
| 401798 | 2014 HK_{32} | — | May 13, 2005 | Mount Lemmon | Mount Lemmon Survey | · | 1.8 km | MPC · JPL |
| 401799 | 2014 HZ_{121} | — | February 9, 2005 | Socorro | LINEAR | · | 1.4 km | MPC · JPL |
| 401800 | 2014 HS_{128} | — | January 16, 2005 | Kitt Peak | Spacewatch | EUN | 1.4 km | MPC · JPL |

== 401801–401900 ==
back to top

| Designation | | | Discovery | | | Properties | | Ref |
| Permanent | Provisional | Named after | Date | Site | Discoverer(s) | Category | Diam. | Ref |
|---|---|---|---|---|---|---|---|---|
| 401801 | 2014 HS_{129} | — | February 28, 2009 | Catalina | CSS | · | 2.5 km | MPC · JPL |
| 401802 | 2014 HM_{130} | — | May 4, 2005 | Kitt Peak | Spacewatch | · | 2.5 km | MPC · JPL |
| 401803 | 2014 HB_{156} | — | March 1, 2009 | Kitt Peak | Spacewatch | AGN | 1.5 km | MPC · JPL |
| 401804 | 2014 HR_{162} | — | February 5, 2000 | Kitt Peak | Spacewatch | LEO | 2.7 km | MPC · JPL |
| 401805 | 2014 HK_{172} | — | July 30, 2006 | Siding Spring | SSS | · | 2.4 km | MPC · JPL |
| 401806 | 2014 HN_{176} | — | July 13, 2004 | Siding Spring | SSS | · | 6.0 km | MPC · JPL |
| 401807 | 2014 HP_{179} | — | October 4, 2007 | Kitt Peak | Spacewatch | MAR | 1.1 km | MPC · JPL |
| 401808 | 2014 JB_{24} | — | December 8, 2005 | Kitt Peak | Spacewatch | · | 900 m | MPC · JPL |
| 401809 | 3195 T-2 | — | September 30, 1973 | Palomar | C. J. van Houten, I. van Houten-Groeneveld, T. Gehrels | · | 1.1 km | MPC · JPL |
| 401810 | 3165 T-3 | — | October 16, 1977 | Palomar | C. J. van Houten, I. van Houten-Groeneveld, T. Gehrels | · | 1.6 km | MPC · JPL |
| 401811 | 1981 EM_{36} | — | March 7, 1981 | Siding Spring | S. J. Bus | · | 1.9 km | MPC · JPL |
| 401812 | 1994 AV_{8} | — | January 8, 1994 | Kitt Peak | Spacewatch | · | 1.1 km | MPC · JPL |
| 401813 | 1994 RB_{5} | — | September 5, 1994 | Kitt Peak | Spacewatch | · | 690 m | MPC · JPL |
| 401814 | 1994 WQ_{8} | — | November 28, 1994 | Kitt Peak | Spacewatch | (2076) | 690 m | MPC · JPL |
| 401815 | 1995 ME_{8} | — | June 29, 1995 | Kitt Peak | Spacewatch | · | 1.9 km | MPC · JPL |
| 401816 | 1995 SL_{76} | — | September 20, 1995 | Kitt Peak | Spacewatch | · | 410 m | MPC · JPL |
| 401817 | 1995 SX_{77} | — | September 30, 1995 | Kitt Peak | Spacewatch | · | 480 m | MPC · JPL |
| 401818 | 1995 UR_{21} | — | October 19, 1995 | Kitt Peak | Spacewatch | KOR | 1.0 km | MPC · JPL |
| 401819 | 1995 UD_{43} | — | October 24, 1995 | Kitt Peak | Spacewatch | · | 1.1 km | MPC · JPL |
| 401820 Špilas | 1996 SP_{7} | Špilas | September 30, 1996 | Kleť | M. Tichý, Z. Moravec | · | 2.1 km | MPC · JPL |
| 401821 | 1997 SM_{7} | — | September 23, 1997 | Kitt Peak | Spacewatch | · | 3.2 km | MPC · JPL |
| 401822 | 1997 YC_{18} | — | November 24, 1997 | Kitt Peak | Spacewatch | DOR | 2.8 km | MPC · JPL |
| 401823 | 1998 QC_{60} | — | August 26, 1998 | Kitt Peak | Spacewatch | EMA | 3.1 km | MPC · JPL |
| 401824 | 1998 QG_{71} | — | August 17, 1998 | Socorro | LINEAR | · | 890 m | MPC · JPL |
| 401825 | 1998 RH_{9} | — | September 13, 1998 | Kitt Peak | Spacewatch | · | 2.0 km | MPC · JPL |
| 401826 | 1998 RR_{11} | — | September 13, 1998 | Kitt Peak | Spacewatch | · | 3.2 km | MPC · JPL |
| 401827 | 1998 SH_{13} | — | September 21, 1998 | Caussols | ODAS | · | 940 m | MPC · JPL |
| 401828 | 1998 SC_{31} | — | September 20, 1998 | Kitt Peak | Spacewatch | EOS | 2.0 km | MPC · JPL |
| 401829 | 1998 SX_{31} | — | September 20, 1998 | Kitt Peak | Spacewatch | · | 760 m | MPC · JPL |
| 401830 | 1998 SZ_{126} | — | September 26, 1998 | Socorro | LINEAR | · | 3.1 km | MPC · JPL |
| 401831 | 1998 TD_{9} | — | September 25, 1998 | Kitt Peak | Spacewatch | · | 3.4 km | MPC · JPL |
| 401832 | 1998 TO_{21} | — | October 13, 1998 | Kitt Peak | Spacewatch | (5) | 1.3 km | MPC · JPL |
| 401833 | 1998 WA_{36} | — | November 19, 1998 | Kitt Peak | Spacewatch | · | 3.1 km | MPC · JPL |
| 401834 | 1999 TB_{167} | — | October 10, 1999 | Socorro | LINEAR | V | 870 m | MPC · JPL |
| 401835 | 1999 TC_{263} | — | October 9, 1999 | Kitt Peak | Spacewatch | · | 1.5 km | MPC · JPL |
| 401836 | 1999 TX_{295} | — | October 1, 1999 | Catalina | CSS | T_{j} (2.99) · 3:2 · SHU | 5.6 km | MPC · JPL |
| 401837 | 1999 UV_{21} | — | October 31, 1999 | Kitt Peak | Spacewatch | · | 1.6 km | MPC · JPL |
| 401838 | 1999 UO_{32} | — | October 31, 1999 | Kitt Peak | Spacewatch | · | 2.8 km | MPC · JPL |
| 401839 | 1999 UE_{54} | — | October 19, 1999 | Kitt Peak | Spacewatch | · | 1.5 km | MPC · JPL |
| 401840 | 1999 UH_{56} | — | October 20, 1999 | Kitt Peak | Spacewatch | · | 1.1 km | MPC · JPL |
| 401841 | 1999 VZ_{75} | — | November 5, 1999 | Kitt Peak | Spacewatch | · | 970 m | MPC · JPL |
| 401842 | 1999 VF_{84} | — | November 6, 1999 | Kitt Peak | Spacewatch | · | 1.0 km | MPC · JPL |
| 401843 | 1999 VH_{88} | — | November 4, 1999 | Socorro | LINEAR | T_{j} (2.98) | 3.8 km | MPC · JPL |
| 401844 | 1999 VM_{105} | — | November 9, 1999 | Socorro | LINEAR | · | 1.2 km | MPC · JPL |
| 401845 | 1999 VW_{116} | — | November 5, 1999 | Kitt Peak | Spacewatch | 3:2 · SHU | 4.2 km | MPC · JPL |
| 401846 | 1999 WN_{5} | — | November 28, 1999 | Kitt Peak | Spacewatch | · | 3.2 km | MPC · JPL |
| 401847 | 1999 WW_{19} | — | November 16, 1999 | Catalina | CSS | · | 1.7 km | MPC · JPL |
| 401848 | 1999 WE_{21} | — | November 16, 1999 | Kitt Peak | Spacewatch | T_{j} (2.96) | 3.6 km | MPC · JPL |
| 401849 | 1999 XY_{77} | — | December 7, 1999 | Socorro | LINEAR | · | 2.4 km | MPC · JPL |
| 401850 | 2000 AC_{90} | — | January 5, 2000 | Socorro | LINEAR | · | 6.4 km | MPC · JPL |
| 401851 | 2000 AE_{207} | — | January 3, 2000 | Kitt Peak | Spacewatch | · | 680 m | MPC · JPL |
| 401852 | 2000 AJ_{219} | — | December 31, 1999 | Kitt Peak | Spacewatch | · | 1.2 km | MPC · JPL |
| 401853 | 2000 DB_{58} | — | February 29, 2000 | Socorro | LINEAR | EUN | 1.2 km | MPC · JPL |
| 401854 | 2000 ER_{3} | — | March 3, 2000 | Socorro | LINEAR | · | 2.0 km | MPC · JPL |
| 401855 | 2000 HW_{79} | — | April 28, 2000 | Anderson Mesa | LONEOS | · | 1.6 km | MPC · JPL |
| 401856 | 2000 KW_{43} | — | May 29, 2000 | Socorro | LINEAR | APO · PHA | 310 m | MPC · JPL |
| 401857 | 2000 PG_{3} | — | August 1, 2000 | Socorro | LINEAR | T_{j} (2.55) · APO +1km | 4.2 km | MPC · JPL |
| 401858 | 2000 QJ_{54} | — | August 25, 2000 | Socorro | LINEAR | · | 950 m | MPC · JPL |
| 401859 | 2000 QZ_{69} | — | August 24, 2000 | Socorro | LINEAR | · | 1.1 km | MPC · JPL |
| 401860 | 2000 QP_{93} | — | August 26, 2000 | Socorro | LINEAR | · | 710 m | MPC · JPL |
| 401861 | 2000 RB_{36} | — | September 3, 2000 | Kitt Peak | Spacewatch | · | 760 m | MPC · JPL |
| 401862 | 2000 SA_{41} | — | September 24, 2000 | Socorro | LINEAR | · | 830 m | MPC · JPL |
| 401863 | 2000 SM_{101} | — | September 24, 2000 | Socorro | LINEAR | (32418) | 1.8 km | MPC · JPL |
| 401864 | 2000 SP_{296} | — | September 28, 2000 | Socorro | LINEAR | · | 1.0 km | MPC · JPL |
| 401865 | 2000 TT_{1} | — | October 1, 2000 | Socorro | LINEAR | · | 940 m | MPC · JPL |
| 401866 | 2000 TF_{24} | — | October 2, 2000 | Socorro | LINEAR | · | 2.4 km | MPC · JPL |
| 401867 | 2000 TM_{25} | — | October 2, 2000 | Socorro | LINEAR | · | 1.1 km | MPC · JPL |
| 401868 | 2000 VS_{41} | — | November 1, 2000 | Socorro | LINEAR | · | 800 m | MPC · JPL |
| 401869 | 2000 VZ_{51} | — | November 3, 2000 | Socorro | LINEAR | · | 1.8 km | MPC · JPL |
| 401870 | 2000 WZ_{10} | — | November 22, 2000 | Kitt Peak | Spacewatch | EOS | 2.3 km | MPC · JPL |
| 401871 | 2000 WA_{44} | — | November 21, 2000 | Socorro | LINEAR | · | 1.0 km | MPC · JPL |
| 401872 | 2001 BR_{70} | — | January 26, 2001 | Socorro | LINEAR | · | 5.6 km | MPC · JPL |
| 401873 | 2001 CF_{17} | — | February 1, 2001 | Socorro | LINEAR | · | 3.0 km | MPC · JPL |
| 401874 | 2001 FN_{60} | — | March 19, 2001 | Socorro | LINEAR | · | 3.8 km | MPC · JPL |
| 401875 | 2001 KW_{9} | — | May 18, 2001 | Socorro | LINEAR | · | 1.5 km | MPC · JPL |
| 401876 | 2001 OH_{17} | — | July 22, 2001 | Ondřejov | P. Pravec, L. Kotková | · | 1.9 km | MPC · JPL |
| 401877 | 2001 ON_{32} | — | July 22, 2001 | Ondřejov | P. Pravec, L. Kotková | · | 1.6 km | MPC · JPL |
| 401878 | 2001 OS_{83} | — | July 27, 2001 | Palomar | NEAT | · | 2.2 km | MPC · JPL |
| 401879 | 2001 OP_{91} | — | July 31, 2001 | Palomar | NEAT | · | 1.4 km | MPC · JPL |
| 401880 | 2001 PY_{34} | — | August 10, 2001 | Palomar | NEAT | JUN | 1.7 km | MPC · JPL |
| 401881 | 2001 QZ_{250} | — | August 24, 2001 | Haleakala | NEAT | · | 3.8 km | MPC · JPL |
| 401882 | 2001 QH_{283} | — | July 21, 2001 | Anderson Mesa | LONEOS | · | 2.4 km | MPC · JPL |
| 401883 | 2001 QU_{329} | — | August 24, 2001 | Anderson Mesa | LONEOS | · | 1.9 km | MPC · JPL |
| 401884 | 2001 QG_{333} | — | August 19, 2001 | Socorro | LINEAR | · | 1.6 km | MPC · JPL |
| 401885 | 2001 RV_{17} | — | September 11, 2001 | Anderson Mesa | LONEOS | ATE | 290 m | MPC · JPL |
| 401886 | 2001 RH_{28} | — | September 7, 2001 | Socorro | LINEAR | · | 1.9 km | MPC · JPL |
| 401887 | 2001 RA_{41} | — | September 11, 2001 | Socorro | LINEAR | JUN | 820 m | MPC · JPL |
| 401888 | 2001 RR_{56} | — | September 24, 1960 | Palomar | C. J. van Houten, I. van Houten-Groeneveld, T. Gehrels | · | 980 m | MPC · JPL |
| 401889 | 2001 RA_{83} | — | August 24, 2001 | Anderson Mesa | LONEOS | · | 1.7 km | MPC · JPL |
| 401890 | 2001 RD_{85} | — | September 11, 2001 | Anderson Mesa | LONEOS | · | 1.3 km | MPC · JPL |
| 401891 | 2001 RW_{121} | — | September 12, 2001 | Socorro | LINEAR | · | 1.8 km | MPC · JPL |
| 401892 | 2001 SA_{5} | — | September 17, 2001 | Socorro | LINEAR | · | 2.6 km | MPC · JPL |
| 401893 | 2001 SR_{27} | — | September 16, 2001 | Socorro | LINEAR | JUN | 1.0 km | MPC · JPL |
| 401894 | 2001 SH_{85} | — | September 20, 2001 | Socorro | LINEAR | MAR | 1.2 km | MPC · JPL |
| 401895 | 2001 SA_{154} | — | September 17, 2001 | Socorro | LINEAR | · | 700 m | MPC · JPL |
| 401896 | 2001 SO_{184} | — | September 19, 2001 | Socorro | LINEAR | H | 510 m | MPC · JPL |
| 401897 | 2001 SM_{224} | — | September 19, 2001 | Socorro | LINEAR | · | 1.8 km | MPC · JPL |
| 401898 | 2001 SO_{269} | — | September 19, 2001 | Kitt Peak | Spacewatch | · | 1.4 km | MPC · JPL |
| 401899 | 2001 SD_{298} | — | February 23, 1998 | Kitt Peak | Spacewatch | · | 3.4 km | MPC · JPL |
| 401900 | 2001 SZ_{301} | — | September 20, 2001 | Socorro | LINEAR | · | 2.2 km | MPC · JPL |

== 401901–402000 ==
back to top

| Designation | | | Discovery | | | Properties | | Ref |
| Permanent | Provisional | Named after | Date | Site | Discoverer(s) | Category | Diam. | Ref |
|---|---|---|---|---|---|---|---|---|
| 401901 | 2001 SX_{307} | — | September 21, 2001 | Socorro | LINEAR | · | 1.6 km | MPC · JPL |
| 401902 | 2001 TF_{20} | — | October 9, 2001 | Socorro | LINEAR | · | 3.1 km | MPC · JPL |
| 401903 | 2001 TW_{22} | — | October 13, 2001 | Socorro | LINEAR | · | 1.9 km | MPC · JPL |
| 401904 | 2001 TA_{84} | — | October 14, 2001 | Socorro | LINEAR | · | 1.7 km | MPC · JPL |
| 401905 | 2001 TY_{101} | — | October 15, 2001 | Socorro | LINEAR | MRX | 1.3 km | MPC · JPL |
| 401906 | 2001 TE_{126} | — | September 23, 2001 | Kitt Peak | Spacewatch | · | 1.4 km | MPC · JPL |
| 401907 | 2001 TE_{136} | — | October 13, 2001 | Palomar | NEAT | JUN | 1.1 km | MPC · JPL |
| 401908 | 2001 TO_{158} | — | October 11, 2001 | Palomar | NEAT | · | 2.0 km | MPC · JPL |
| 401909 | 2001 TR_{163} | — | October 11, 2001 | Palomar | NEAT | · | 1.7 km | MPC · JPL |
| 401910 | 2001 UJ_{71} | — | October 17, 2001 | Kitt Peak | Spacewatch | · | 720 m | MPC · JPL |
| 401911 | 2001 UF_{77} | — | October 17, 2001 | Socorro | LINEAR | · | 2.0 km | MPC · JPL |
| 401912 | 2001 UG_{108} | — | October 20, 2001 | Socorro | LINEAR | · | 490 m | MPC · JPL |
| 401913 | 2001 UE_{120} | — | October 22, 2001 | Socorro | LINEAR | · | 650 m | MPC · JPL |
| 401914 | 2001 UZ_{128} | — | October 20, 2001 | Socorro | LINEAR | · | 1.4 km | MPC · JPL |
| 401915 | 2001 UD_{187} | — | September 18, 2001 | Anderson Mesa | LONEOS | · | 630 m | MPC · JPL |
| 401916 | 2001 VV_{38} | — | November 9, 2001 | Socorro | LINEAR | · | 1.0 km | MPC · JPL |
| 401917 | 2001 VG_{128} | — | November 11, 2001 | Apache Point | SDSS | · | 770 m | MPC · JPL |
| 401918 | 2001 WF_{37} | — | November 17, 2001 | Socorro | LINEAR | · | 2.9 km | MPC · JPL |
| 401919 | 2001 WW_{53} | — | October 24, 2001 | Kitt Peak | Spacewatch | · | 1.5 km | MPC · JPL |
| 401920 | 2001 WD_{87} | — | November 19, 2001 | Socorro | LINEAR | · | 2.0 km | MPC · JPL |
| 401921 | 2001 XL_{6} | — | December 9, 2001 | Socorro | LINEAR | · | 3.0 km | MPC · JPL |
| 401922 | 2001 XJ_{45} | — | December 9, 2001 | Socorro | LINEAR | · | 1.4 km | MPC · JPL |
| 401923 | 2001 XV_{166} | — | December 14, 2001 | Socorro | LINEAR | · | 780 m | MPC · JPL |
| 401924 | 2001 YZ_{50} | — | November 24, 2001 | Socorro | LINEAR | · | 1.9 km | MPC · JPL |
| 401925 | 2002 AT_{15} | — | January 12, 2002 | Socorro | LINEAR | APO | 480 m | MPC · JPL |
| 401926 | 2002 AF_{167} | — | January 13, 2002 | Socorro | LINEAR | · | 2.4 km | MPC · JPL |
| 401927 | 2002 AH_{178} | — | January 14, 2002 | Socorro | LINEAR | · | 930 m | MPC · JPL |
| 401928 | 2002 CF_{10} | — | February 6, 2002 | Socorro | LINEAR | H | 630 m | MPC · JPL |
| 401929 | 2002 CC_{88} | — | February 7, 2002 | Socorro | LINEAR | · | 1.6 km | MPC · JPL |
| 401930 | 2002 CK_{150} | — | February 10, 2002 | Socorro | LINEAR | KOR | 1.7 km | MPC · JPL |
| 401931 | 2002 CU_{156} | — | February 7, 2002 | Socorro | LINEAR | · | 910 m | MPC · JPL |
| 401932 | 2002 CD_{182} | — | February 10, 2002 | Socorro | LINEAR | V | 720 m | MPC · JPL |
| 401933 | 2002 CR_{201} | — | February 10, 2002 | Socorro | LINEAR | · | 820 m | MPC · JPL |
| 401934 | 2002 CA_{206} | — | February 10, 2002 | Socorro | LINEAR | · | 1.1 km | MPC · JPL |
| 401935 | 2002 CW_{208} | — | February 10, 2002 | Socorro | LINEAR | MAS | 780 m | MPC · JPL |
| 401936 | 2002 CN_{260} | — | February 7, 2002 | Palomar | NEAT | · | 2.3 km | MPC · JPL |
| 401937 | 2002 CF_{314} | — | February 6, 2002 | Kitt Peak | M. W. Buie | · | 1.2 km | MPC · JPL |
| 401938 | 2002 EY_{47} | — | March 12, 2002 | Palomar | NEAT | · | 1.9 km | MPC · JPL |
| 401939 | 2002 EH_{51} | — | March 12, 2002 | Kitt Peak | Spacewatch | EOS | 1.8 km | MPC · JPL |
| 401940 | 2002 EK_{76} | — | March 10, 2002 | Kitt Peak | Spacewatch | · | 2.7 km | MPC · JPL |
| 401941 | 2002 EL_{95} | — | March 14, 2002 | Socorro | LINEAR | (2076) | 1.2 km | MPC · JPL |
| 401942 | 2002 EP_{143} | — | March 12, 2002 | Palomar | NEAT | · | 1.0 km | MPC · JPL |
| 401943 | 2002 GE_{115} | — | March 12, 2002 | Kitt Peak | Spacewatch | · | 1.1 km | MPC · JPL |
| 401944 | 2002 GT_{187} | — | April 12, 2002 | Palomar | NEAT | ERI | 2.3 km | MPC · JPL |
| 401945 | 2002 JA_{118} | — | May 4, 2002 | Anderson Mesa | LONEOS | · | 2.0 km | MPC · JPL |
| 401946 | 2002 JC_{150} | — | May 7, 2002 | Palomar | NEAT | · | 1.2 km | MPC · JPL |
| 401947 | 2002 PH_{2} | — | August 3, 2002 | Palomar | NEAT | THB | 3.6 km | MPC · JPL |
| 401948 | 2002 PS_{179} | — | August 5, 2002 | Campo Imperatore | CINEOS | · | 1.2 km | MPC · JPL |
| 401949 | 2002 QT_{70} | — | August 28, 2002 | Palomar | NEAT | · | 2.6 km | MPC · JPL |
| 401950 | 2002 QW_{81} | — | August 30, 2002 | Palomar | NEAT | · | 920 m | MPC · JPL |
| 401951 | 2002 QT_{111} | — | August 16, 2002 | Palomar | NEAT | · | 1.9 km | MPC · JPL |
| 401952 | 2002 QN_{122} | — | August 29, 2002 | Palomar | NEAT | · | 1.1 km | MPC · JPL |
| 401953 | 2002 RW_{5} | — | September 3, 2002 | Haleakala | NEAT | MAR | 1.3 km | MPC · JPL |
| 401954 | 2002 RW_{25} | — | September 5, 2002 | Socorro | LINEAR | ATE · PHA | 590 m | MPC · JPL |
| 401955 | 2002 RY_{28} | — | September 2, 2002 | Haleakala | NEAT | (5) | 1.5 km | MPC · JPL |
| 401956 | 2002 RK_{29} | — | September 3, 2002 | Haleakala | NEAT | (5) | 1.1 km | MPC · JPL |
| 401957 | 2002 RJ_{241} | — | September 14, 2002 | Palomar | R. Matson | · | 1.2 km | MPC · JPL |
| 401958 | 2002 RY_{248} | — | September 14, 2002 | Palomar | NEAT | CYB | 3.3 km | MPC · JPL |
| 401959 | 2002 RJ_{250} | — | September 4, 2002 | Palomar | NEAT | · | 1 km | MPC · JPL |
| 401960 | 2002 RL_{262} | — | September 11, 2002 | Palomar | NEAT | (5) | 1.4 km | MPC · JPL |
| 401961 | 2002 RO_{278} | — | September 14, 2002 | Palomar | NEAT | · | 3.8 km | MPC · JPL |
| 401962 | 2002 ST_{21} | — | September 26, 2002 | Palomar | NEAT | · | 910 m | MPC · JPL |
| 401963 | 2002 SW_{21} | — | September 26, 2002 | Palomar | NEAT | · | 1.1 km | MPC · JPL |
| 401964 | 2002 SA_{40} | — | September 30, 2002 | Haleakala | NEAT | · | 1.4 km | MPC · JPL |
| 401965 | 2002 TJ_{99} | — | October 4, 2002 | Palomar | NEAT | · | 1 km | MPC · JPL |
| 401966 | 2002 TP_{132} | — | October 4, 2002 | Socorro | LINEAR | (5) | 1.4 km | MPC · JPL |
| 401967 | 2002 TK_{135} | — | October 4, 2002 | Socorro | LINEAR | (5) | 1.3 km | MPC · JPL |
| 401968 | 2002 TE_{138} | — | October 4, 2002 | Anderson Mesa | LONEOS | · | 540 m | MPC · JPL |
| 401969 | 2002 TY_{144} | — | October 2, 2002 | Haleakala | NEAT | · | 930 m | MPC · JPL |
| 401970 | 2002 TB_{185} | — | October 4, 2002 | Socorro | LINEAR | · | 1.1 km | MPC · JPL |
| 401971 | 2002 TE_{195} | — | October 3, 2002 | Socorro | LINEAR | · | 1.1 km | MPC · JPL |
| 401972 | 2002 TN_{199} | — | October 6, 2002 | Socorro | LINEAR | · | 4.7 km | MPC · JPL |
| 401973 | 2002 TC_{251} | — | October 7, 2002 | Socorro | LINEAR | · | 1.6 km | MPC · JPL |
| 401974 | 2002 TG_{257} | — | October 9, 2002 | Socorro | LINEAR | · | 960 m | MPC · JPL |
| 401975 | 2002 TJ_{273} | — | October 9, 2002 | Socorro | LINEAR | · | 790 m | MPC · JPL |
| 401976 | 2002 TO_{336} | — | October 5, 2002 | Apache Point | SDSS | (5) | 1.2 km | MPC · JPL |
| 401977 | 2002 TZ_{380} | — | October 9, 2002 | Palomar | NEAT | (5) | 1.1 km | MPC · JPL |
| 401978 | 2002 UL_{16} | — | October 30, 2002 | Palomar | NEAT | · | 1.1 km | MPC · JPL |
| 401979 | 2002 UC_{32} | — | October 30, 2002 | Haleakala | NEAT | · | 550 m | MPC · JPL |
| 401980 | 2002 VV_{42} | — | November 4, 2002 | Palomar | NEAT | (5) | 900 m | MPC · JPL |
| 401981 | 2002 VK_{43} | — | November 4, 2002 | Palomar | NEAT | · | 1.3 km | MPC · JPL |
| 401982 | 2002 VO_{61} | — | November 5, 2002 | Socorro | LINEAR | · | 1.0 km | MPC · JPL |
| 401983 | 2002 VE_{73} | — | November 7, 2002 | Socorro | LINEAR | · | 1.4 km | MPC · JPL |
| 401984 | 2002 VU_{115} | — | November 11, 2002 | Socorro | LINEAR | · | 1.2 km | MPC · JPL |
| 401985 | 2002 VA_{120} | — | November 12, 2002 | Socorro | LINEAR | H | 540 m | MPC · JPL |
| 401986 | 2002 VX_{142} | — | November 5, 2002 | Palomar | NEAT | (5) | 1.3 km | MPC · JPL |
| 401987 | 2002 WE_{1} | — | November 12, 2002 | Socorro | LINEAR | H | 560 m | MPC · JPL |
| 401988 | 2002 WD_{26} | — | November 16, 2002 | Palomar | NEAT | · | 710 m | MPC · JPL |
| 401989 | 2002 WN_{31} | — | November 28, 2002 | Haleakala | NEAT | (5) | 1.2 km | MPC · JPL |
| 401990 | 2002 XR_{51} | — | December 10, 2002 | Socorro | LINEAR | · | 1.3 km | MPC · JPL |
| 401991 | 2002 YZ_{11} | — | December 31, 2002 | Socorro | LINEAR | · | 2.7 km | MPC · JPL |
| 401992 | 2003 AC_{5} | — | January 1, 2003 | Socorro | LINEAR | · | 1.1 km | MPC · JPL |
| 401993 | 2003 AB_{94} | — | January 10, 2003 | Palomar | NEAT | · | 1.4 km | MPC · JPL |
| 401994 | 2003 BS_{27} | — | January 26, 2003 | Anderson Mesa | LONEOS | · | 1.8 km | MPC · JPL |
| 401995 | 2003 CR_{3} | — | January 27, 2003 | Socorro | LINEAR | JUN | 1.2 km | MPC · JPL |
| 401996 | 2003 FJ_{95} | — | March 30, 2003 | Anderson Mesa | LONEOS | · | 2.8 km | MPC · JPL |
| 401997 | 2003 GH_{56} | — | April 2, 2003 | Haleakala | NEAT | · | 1.0 km | MPC · JPL |
| 401998 | 2003 MO | — | June 22, 2003 | Socorro | LINEAR | APO | 740 m | MPC · JPL |
| 401999 | 2003 NG | — | July 1, 2003 | Haleakala | NEAT | · | 1.1 km | MPC · JPL |
| 402000 | 2003 OK_{32} | — | July 29, 2003 | Mauna Kea | David, E.-M. | · | 2.2 km | MPC · JPL |

back to top

== Meaning of names ==
As minor planet discoveries are confirmed, they are given a permanent number by the IAU's Minor Planet Center (MPC), and the discoverers can then submit names for them, following the IAU's naming conventions. The list below concerns those minor planets in the specified number-range that have received names, and explains the meanings of those names.

Official naming citations of newly named small Solar System bodies are approved and published in a bulletin by IAU's Working Group for Small Bodies Nomenclature (WGSBN). Before May 2021, citations were published in MPC's Minor Planet Circulars for many decades. Recent citations can also be found on the JPL Small-Body Database (SBDB). Until his death in 2016, German astronomer Lutz D. Schmadel compiled these citations into the Dictionary of Minor Planet Names (DMP) and regularly updated the collection.

Based on Paul Herget's The Names of the Minor Planets, Schmadel also researched the unclear origin of numerous asteroids, most of which had been named prior to World War II. This article incorporates text from this source, which is in the public domain: SBDB New namings may only be added to this list below after official publication as the preannouncement of names is condemned. The WGSBN publishes a comprehensive guideline for the naming rules of non-cometary small Solar System bodies.

| Named minor planet | Provisional | This minor planet was named for... | Ref · Catalog |
|---|---|---|---|
| 401820 Špilas | 1996 SP_{7} | Špilberk Castle, a castle in Brno, Czech Republic | IAU · 401820 |
