= Musser (disambiguation) =

Musser is a surname.

Musser may also refer to:

- Musser Mallet Company, manufacturer of xylophones, marimbas, and vibraphones, now part of Ludwig Drums
- Musser-Stevens grip, a method of playing keyboard percussion instruments with four mallets
- Musser Scout Reservation
- Musser Lumber Company

== See also ==
- Moussier (disambiguation)
- Musse
- MUSS (disambiguation)
