= Moza =

Moza or MOZA may refer to:

- in biblical context:
  - a son of Caleb
  - a descendant of Saul
  - ancient Motza or modern Motza, near Jerusalem
- the river Meuse in western Europe
- Mouza, an administrative unit in India, Pakistan and Bangladesh
  - Mouzadar, the administrator of such a unit
- 59980 Moza, an asteroid
- Men of Zimbabwe Arise, a civic movement in Zimbabwe
- MOZA (brand), a sim racing and flight simulation hardware manufacturer

== See also ==
- Mosa (disambiguation)
- Mozza (disambiguation)
