= Musse =

Musse kan refer to:

- Musse (name), surname and given name
- Musse, nickname for Mustafa (among others)

== Geography ==
=== Angola ===
Places named Musse in Angola.
- Musse, various rivers in Angola

=== Denmark ===
- Musse Herred, a previous hundred of Denmark
  - Musse Church, a church on Lolland, Denmark, previously part of Musse Herred
  - Store Musse, a village on Lolland, Denmark, previously part of Musse Herred, now Guldborgsund Municipality
- Musse Sogn, a county in Denmark

== Swedish ==
- Musse Pigg, the Swedish name for Mickey Mouse
- Musse, Swedish slang for vehicles named Mustang, such as the Ford Mustang and North American P-51 Mustang

== Ukrainian ==
- Musse, transliteration of Муссе, Ukrainian for Moussey

== See also ==
- Mousse
- Musser (disambiguation)
- Mosa
