= Musse (name) =

Musse is a surname and given name.

== Arabic male give name ==
Musse (مُوسَىٰ, Mūsā) is a male given name in the Arabic language. It is derived from a Hebrew-language phrase meaning "drawn out of the water" and corresponds to Moses (see Moses in Islam).

Musa may also be transliterated as Musa, Mosa, Moosa, Mousa, Moussa.

== Sweden ==
In Sweden, Musse is the forename of the Disney character Mickey Mouse, full Swedish name Musse Pigg, and strongly associated with the character.

Musse (plural: Mussar) is also a Swedish slang nickname for vehicles named "Mustang", such as the Ford Mustang or North American P-51 Mustang.

== People ==
- Ali Musse (born 1996), Somali professional footballer
- Paulo Musse (born 1978), Brazilian footballer
- Musse Olol, Somali-American engineer and social activist

== Fictional characters ==
- Musse Egret, a character introduced in the game The Legend of Heroes: Trails of Cold Steel III

== See also ==
- Mousse
- Musser (disambiguation)
- Mosa (surname)
