= Dick Joyce =

Dick or Richard Joyce may refer to:

- Dick Joyce (baseball) (1943–2007), pitcher
- Dick Joyce (rower) (born 1946), former New Zealand rower
- Richard Joyce (goldsmith) (c. 1660–1737), Irish goldsmith
- Richard Joyce (philosopher) (born 1966), British-Australian moral philosopher
- Richard Joyce (field hockey) (born 1992), New Zealand field hockey player
- Richard Joyce (astronomer) (born 1944), American astronomer
- Richard Joyce (runner), winner of the 1967 4 × 880 yard relay at the NCAA Division I Indoor Track and Field Championships

== See also ==
- Dick Joice (1921–1999), British broadcaster and historian
