= Mosa (surname) =

Mosa is a surname. Notable people with the surname include:

- Aníbal Mosa, Chilean entrepreneur
- Edgar Mosa, Portuguese-born American jewelry designer and visual artist
- Taha Mosa, Syrian football player
- Tahiry Mosa, Malagasy politician

== See also ==
- Mosa (disambiguation)
- Musa (name)
