= Mosa =

Mosa may refer to:

- Mosa Meat, Dutch food technology company
- Mosa (surname)
- Moša Pijade (1890–1957), Yugoslav politician and close associate of Tito

== See also ==
- Moza (disambiguation)
- Mossa (disambiguation)
