= Musser =

Musser is a surname. Notable people with the surname include:

- A. Milton Musser (1830–1909), Mormon pioneer
- Alec Musser (1973–2024), American fitness model and actor
- Andy Musser (1937–2012), American sportscaster
- Charles Musser (born 1951), American film scholar
- Clair Omar Musser (1901–1998), American marimba virtuoso, designer, and composer
- Danny Musser (1905–2000), American professional baseball player
- David Musser (contemporary), American computer scientist
- Frank Musser, American politician
- George Musser (born 1965), American science writer
- Guy Musser (1936–2019), American zoologist
- Joseph White Musser (1872–1954), Mormon fundamentalist leader
- Neal Musser (born 1980), American professional baseball player
- Paul Musser (1889–1973), American professional baseball player
- Pete Musser (1928-2019), American businessman
- Rebecca Musser (born 1976), wife of Rulon Jeffs and escapee from the FLDS
- Terry Musser (1947Hautamäki2018), American politician
- Tharon Musser (1925–2009), American Broadway lighting designer
- Walton Musser (1909–1998), inventor of strain wave gearing and 250 inventions/discoveries

== See also ==
- Moussier
