= List of minor planets: 59001–60000 =

The following is a partial list of minor planets, running from minor-planet number 59001 through 60000, inclusive. The primary data for this and other partial lists is based on JPL's "Small-Body Orbital Elements" and data available from the Minor Planet Center. Critical list information is also provided by the MPC, unless otherwise specified from Lowell Observatory. A detailed description of the table's columns and additional sources are given on the main page including a complete list of every page in this series, and a statistical break-up on the dynamical classification of minor planets.

Also see the summary list of all named bodies in numerical and alphabetical order, and the corresponding naming citations for the number range of this particular list. New namings may only be added to this list after official publication, as the preannouncement of names is condemned by the Working Group for Small Bodies Nomenclature of the International Astronomical Union.

Near-Earth obj.	MBA (inner)	MBA (outer)	Centaur
Mars-crosser	MBA (middle)	Jupiter trojan	Trans-Neptunian obj.
Unclassified

== 59001–59100 ==
Designation			Discovery			Properties		Ref
Permanent	Provisional	Named after	Date	Site	Discoverer(s)	Category	Diam.	Ref
59001 Senftenberg	1998 SZ_{35}	Senftenberg	September 26, 1998	Kleť	J. Tichá, M. Tichý	RAF	2.7 km	MPC · JPL
59002	1998 SZ_{36}	—	September 21, 1998	Kitt Peak	Spacewatch	·	3.3 km	MPC · JPL
59003	1998 SL_{43}	—	September 23, 1998	Xinglong	SCAP	·	1.7 km	MPC · JPL
59004	1998 SO_{43}	—	September 25, 1998	Xinglong	SCAP	THM	6.0 km	MPC · JPL
59005	1998 SW_{54}	—	September 16, 1998	Anderson Mesa	LONEOS	·	2.6 km	MPC · JPL
59006	1998 SX_{58}	—	September 17, 1998	Anderson Mesa	LONEOS	·	1.7 km	MPC · JPL
59007	1998 SF_{63}	—	September 26, 1998	Xinglong	SCAP	·	4.9 km	MPC · JPL
59008	1998 SS_{63}	—	September 30, 1998	Xinglong	SCAP	·	4.1 km	MPC · JPL
59009	1998 SZ_{65}	—	September 20, 1998	La Silla	E. W. Elst	V	1.9 km	MPC · JPL
59010	1998 SX_{67}	—	September 19, 1998	Socorro	LINEAR	RAF	2.3 km	MPC · JPL
59011	1998 SD_{71}	—	September 21, 1998	La Silla	E. W. Elst	·	2.2 km	MPC · JPL
59012	1998 SW_{71}	—	September 21, 1998	La Silla	E. W. Elst	·	8.1 km	MPC · JPL
59013	1998 SL_{72}	—	September 21, 1998	La Silla	E. W. Elst	·	3.5 km	MPC · JPL
59014	1998 SC_{74}	—	September 21, 1998	La Silla	E. W. Elst	NYS	2.3 km	MPC · JPL
59015	1998 SH_{74}	—	September 21, 1998	La Silla	E. W. Elst	·	2.8 km	MPC · JPL
59016	1998 SX_{76}	—	September 26, 1998	Socorro	LINEAR	·	2.5 km	MPC · JPL
59017	1998 ST_{77}	—	September 26, 1998	Socorro	LINEAR	·	2.7 km	MPC · JPL
59018	1998 SH_{80}	—	September 26, 1998	Socorro	LINEAR	ERI	3.6 km	MPC · JPL
59019	1998 SM_{83}	—	September 26, 1998	Socorro	LINEAR	·	3.8 km	MPC · JPL
59020	1998 SX_{86}	—	September 26, 1998	Socorro	LINEAR	·	4.6 km	MPC · JPL
59021	1998 SN_{94}	—	September 26, 1998	Socorro	LINEAR	·	2.0 km	MPC · JPL
59022	1998 SC_{100}	—	September 26, 1998	Socorro	LINEAR	·	1.9 km	MPC · JPL
59023	1998 SV_{103}	—	September 26, 1998	Socorro	LINEAR	·	4.2 km	MPC · JPL
59024	1998 SB_{106}	—	September 26, 1998	Socorro	LINEAR	·	1.6 km	MPC · JPL
59025	1998 SX_{110}	—	September 26, 1998	Socorro	LINEAR	·	1.6 km	MPC · JPL
59026	1998 SS_{111}	—	September 26, 1998	Socorro	LINEAR	NYS	2.2 km	MPC · JPL
59027	1998 SO_{115}	—	September 26, 1998	Socorro	LINEAR	·	2.4 km	MPC · JPL
59028	1998 SV_{117}	—	September 26, 1998	Socorro	LINEAR	·	3.8 km	MPC · JPL
59029	1998 SP_{118}	—	September 26, 1998	Socorro	LINEAR	·	2.7 km	MPC · JPL
59030	1998 SB_{122}	—	September 26, 1998	Socorro	LINEAR	·	2.9 km	MPC · JPL
59031	1998 SM_{124}	—	September 26, 1998	Socorro	LINEAR	·	1.6 km	MPC · JPL
59032	1998 SG_{125}	—	September 26, 1998	Socorro	LINEAR	V	1.3 km	MPC · JPL
59033	1998 SQ_{127}	—	September 26, 1998	Socorro	LINEAR	·	1.7 km	MPC · JPL
59034	1998 SO_{128}	—	September 26, 1998	Socorro	LINEAR	·	3.4 km	MPC · JPL
59035	1998 SF_{134}	—	September 26, 1998	Socorro	LINEAR	·	4.2 km	MPC · JPL
59036	1998 SD_{135}	—	September 26, 1998	Socorro	LINEAR	·	7.5 km	MPC · JPL
59037	1998 SU_{140}	—	September 26, 1998	Socorro	LINEAR	·	2.7 km	MPC · JPL
59038	1998 SG_{147}	—	September 20, 1998	La Silla	E. W. Elst	·	1.8 km	MPC · JPL
59039	1998 SS_{156}	—	September 26, 1998	Socorro	LINEAR	·	1.4 km	MPC · JPL
59040	1998 SR_{160}	—	September 26, 1998	Socorro	LINEAR	·	3.3 km	MPC · JPL
59041	1998 SS_{161}	—	September 26, 1998	Socorro	LINEAR	NYS	3.3 km	MPC · JPL
59042	1998 SW_{162}	—	September 26, 1998	Socorro	LINEAR	(5)	2.0 km	MPC · JPL
59043	1998 SF_{167}	—	September 27, 1998	Anderson Mesa	LONEOS	(5)	2.7 km	MPC · JPL
59044	1998 SV_{169}	—	September 18, 1998	Anderson Mesa	LONEOS	·	4.3 km	MPC · JPL
59045 Gérardlemaitre	1998 TR_{2}	Gérardlemaitre	October 13, 1998	Caussols	ODAS	·	2.1 km	MPC · JPL
59046	1998 TW_{17}	—	October 13, 1998	Višnjan Observatory	K. Korlević	·	3.1 km	MPC · JPL
59047	1998 TO_{19}	—	October 15, 1998	Xinglong	SCAP	·	2.1 km	MPC · JPL
59048	1998 TH_{22}	—	October 13, 1998	Kitt Peak	Spacewatch	MAS	1.5 km	MPC · JPL
59049	1998 TC_{31}	—	October 10, 1998	Anderson Mesa	LONEOS	L4	30 km	MPC · JPL
59050	1998 TB_{33}	—	October 14, 1998	Anderson Mesa	LONEOS	3:2	15 km	MPC · JPL
59051	1998 TJ_{33}	—	October 14, 1998	Anderson Mesa	LONEOS	NYS ·	3.9 km	MPC · JPL
59052	1998 TV_{34}	—	October 14, 1998	Anderson Mesa	LONEOS	·	1.8 km	MPC · JPL
59053	1998 UU_{1}	—	October 20, 1998	Kitt Peak	Spacewatch	·	2.1 km	MPC · JPL
59054	1998 UY_{5}	—	October 22, 1998	Caussols	ODAS	·	4.8 km	MPC · JPL
59055	1998 UQ_{7}	—	October 22, 1998	Višnjan Observatory	K. Korlević	EUN	3.1 km	MPC · JPL
59056	1998 UK_{16}	—	October 22, 1998	Višnjan Observatory	K. Korlević	·	2.8 km	MPC · JPL
59057	1998 UO_{18}	—	October 25, 1998	Oizumi	T. Kobayashi	NYS	2.8 km	MPC · JPL
59058	1998 UA_{19}	—	October 27, 1998	Višnjan Observatory	K. Korlević	PAD	6.2 km	MPC · JPL
59059	1998 UZ_{22}	—	October 30, 1998	Višnjan Observatory	K. Korlević	·	4.5 km	MPC · JPL
59060	1998 UE_{25}	—	October 18, 1998	La Silla	E. W. Elst	·	1.3 km	MPC · JPL
59061	1998 UP_{25}	—	October 18, 1998	La Silla	E. W. Elst	·	1.4 km	MPC · JPL
59062	1998 US_{25}	—	October 18, 1998	La Silla	E. W. Elst	·	1.6 km	MPC · JPL
59063	1998 UC_{32}	—	October 27, 1998	Xinglong	SCAP	·	3.1 km	MPC · JPL
59064	1998 UB_{33}	—	October 28, 1998	Socorro	LINEAR	·	3.3 km	MPC · JPL
59065	1998 UB_{43}	—	October 28, 1998	Socorro	LINEAR	SUL	6.6 km	MPC · JPL
59066	1998 VY	—	November 10, 1998	Socorro	LINEAR	PHO	4.0 km	MPC · JPL
59067 Claudiaangeli	1998 VS_{1}	Claudiaangeli	November 9, 1998	Caussols	ODAS	·	4.1 km	MPC · JPL
59068 Pierrebourget	1998 VZ_{1}	Pierrebourget	November 9, 1998	Caussols	ODAS	·	3.1 km	MPC · JPL
59069	1998 VX_{3}	—	November 11, 1998	Caussols	ODAS	·	2.4 km	MPC · JPL
59070	1998 VG_{6}	—	November 11, 1998	Nachi-Katsuura	Y. Shimizu, T. Urata	·	2.6 km	MPC · JPL
59071	1998 VX_{7}	—	November 10, 1998	Socorro	LINEAR	·	4.6 km	MPC · JPL
59072	1998 VV_{9}	—	November 10, 1998	Socorro	LINEAR	·	4.7 km	MPC · JPL
59073	1998 VL_{13}	—	November 10, 1998	Socorro	LINEAR	·	2.5 km	MPC · JPL
59074	1998 VN_{13}	—	November 10, 1998	Socorro	LINEAR	·	1.6 km	MPC · JPL
59075	1998 VT_{13}	—	November 10, 1998	Socorro	LINEAR	fast	1.9 km	MPC · JPL
59076	1998 VT_{14}	—	November 10, 1998	Socorro	LINEAR	·	4.8 km	MPC · JPL
59077	1998 VT_{15}	—	November 10, 1998	Socorro	LINEAR	·	2.8 km	MPC · JPL
59078	1998 VT_{19}	—	November 10, 1998	Socorro	LINEAR	·	2.2 km	MPC · JPL
59079	1998 VY_{19}	—	November 10, 1998	Socorro	LINEAR	3:2	18 km	MPC · JPL
59080	1998 VU_{21}	—	November 10, 1998	Socorro	LINEAR	·	1.8 km	MPC · JPL
59081	1998 VJ_{24}	—	November 10, 1998	Socorro	LINEAR	·	1.5 km	MPC · JPL
59082	1998 VJ_{25}	—	November 10, 1998	Socorro	LINEAR	·	1.5 km	MPC · JPL
59083	1998 VZ_{25}	—	November 10, 1998	Socorro	LINEAR	NYS	3.5 km	MPC · JPL
59084	1998 VD_{26}	—	November 10, 1998	Socorro	LINEAR	·	10 km	MPC · JPL
59085	1998 VK_{29}	—	November 10, 1998	Socorro	LINEAR	·	2.0 km	MPC · JPL
59086	1998 VJ_{31}	—	November 14, 1998	Oizumi	T. Kobayashi	·	3.2 km	MPC · JPL
59087 Maccacaro	1998 VT_{33}	Maccacaro	November 15, 1998	Sormano	P. Sicoli, F. Manca	·	2.6 km	MPC · JPL
59088	1998 VW_{35}	—	November 9, 1998	Xinglong	SCAP	·	1.8 km	MPC · JPL
59089	1998 VF_{38}	—	November 10, 1998	Socorro	LINEAR	NYS	2.9 km	MPC · JPL
59090	1998 VZ_{41}	—	November 14, 1998	Kitt Peak	Spacewatch	·	1.8 km	MPC · JPL
59091	1998 VJ_{42}	—	November 15, 1998	Kitt Peak	Spacewatch	·	1.5 km	MPC · JPL
59092	1998 VT_{42}	—	November 15, 1998	Kitt Peak	Spacewatch	·	2.0 km	MPC · JPL
59093	1998 VE_{47}	—	November 14, 1998	Kitt Peak	Spacewatch	·	5.1 km	MPC · JPL
59094	1998 VM_{49}	—	November 11, 1998	Socorro	LINEAR	·	2.0 km	MPC · JPL
59095	1998 WK	—	November 16, 1998	Prescott	P. G. Comba	·	2.6 km	MPC · JPL
59096	1998 WT_{3}	—	November 18, 1998	Kushiro	S. Ueda, H. Kaneda	·	4.2 km	MPC · JPL
59097	1998 WD_{5}	—	November 20, 1998	Valinhos	P. R. Holvorcem	NYS	1.9 km	MPC · JPL
59098	1998 WN_{7}	—	November 20, 1998	Valinhos	P. R. Holvorcem	fast	5.5 km	MPC · JPL
59099	1998 WS_{10}	—	November 21, 1998	Socorro	LINEAR	·	4.9 km	MPC · JPL
59100	1998 WA_{11}	—	November 21, 1998	Socorro	LINEAR	·	3.4 km	MPC · JPL

== 59101–59200 ==
back to top

Designation			Discovery			Properties		Ref
Permanent	Provisional	Named after	Date	Site	Discoverer(s)	Category	Diam.	Ref
59101	1998 WB_{13}	—	November 21, 1998	Socorro	LINEAR	(5)	2.6 km	MPC · JPL
59102	1998 WC_{14}	—	November 21, 1998	Socorro	LINEAR	·	1.4 km	MPC · JPL
59103	1998 WF_{15}	—	November 21, 1998	Socorro	LINEAR	·	3.5 km	MPC · JPL
59104	1998 WQ_{17}	—	November 21, 1998	Socorro	LINEAR	·	2.9 km	MPC · JPL
59105	1998 WP_{20}	—	November 18, 1998	Socorro	LINEAR	MAS	1.9 km	MPC · JPL
59106	1998 WF_{23}	—	November 18, 1998	Socorro	LINEAR	·	2.0 km	MPC · JPL
59107	1998 WF_{27}	—	November 17, 1998	Kitt Peak	Spacewatch	·	3.3 km	MPC · JPL
59108	1998 WG_{27}	—	November 17, 1998	Kitt Peak	Spacewatch	·	4.9 km	MPC · JPL
59109	1998 WT_{28}	—	November 21, 1998	Kitt Peak	Spacewatch	V	1.6 km	MPC · JPL
59110	1998 WR_{31}	—	November 29, 1998	Burlington	Handley, T.	·	2.7 km	MPC · JPL
59111	1998 WZ_{33}	—	November 23, 1998	Anderson Mesa	LONEOS	·	3.8 km	MPC · JPL
59112	1998 WN_{35}	—	November 18, 1998	Kitt Peak	Spacewatch	3:2	18 km	MPC · JPL
59113	1998 XQ	—	December 10, 1998	Kleť	Kleť	·	3.0 km	MPC · JPL
59114	1998 XQ_{2}	—	December 7, 1998	San Marcello	A. Boattini, L. Tesi	·	1.6 km	MPC · JPL
59115	1998 XG_{3}	—	December 8, 1998	Xinglong	SCAP	·	2.9 km	MPC · JPL
59116	1998 XL_{3}	—	December 9, 1998	Oizumi	T. Kobayashi	·	1.8 km	MPC · JPL
59117	1998 XQ_{3}	—	December 9, 1998	Oizumi	T. Kobayashi	PAD	4.5 km	MPC · JPL
59118	1998 XS_{5}	—	December 8, 1998	Kitt Peak	Spacewatch	·	2.7 km	MPC · JPL
59119	1998 XU_{5}	—	December 8, 1998	Kitt Peak	Spacewatch	·	2.9 km	MPC · JPL
59120	1998 XT_{8}	—	December 11, 1998	Gekko	T. Kagawa	NYS	2.3 km	MPC · JPL
59121	1998 XR_{10}	—	December 15, 1998	Caussols	ODAS	MAS	2.1 km	MPC · JPL
59122 Bienaymé	1998 XJ_{15}	Bienaymé	December 15, 1998	Caussols	ODAS	fast	4.1 km	MPC · JPL
59123	1998 XN_{16}	—	December 14, 1998	Socorro	LINEAR	PHO	4.6 km	MPC · JPL
59124	1998 XJ_{19}	—	December 10, 1998	Kitt Peak	Spacewatch	·	1.6 km	MPC · JPL
59125	1998 XK_{20}	—	December 10, 1998	Kitt Peak	Spacewatch	·	3.4 km	MPC · JPL
59126	1998 XE_{25}	—	December 13, 1998	Kitt Peak	Spacewatch	·	3.0 km	MPC · JPL
59127	1998 XP_{25}	—	December 13, 1998	Kitt Peak	Spacewatch	·	1.9 km	MPC · JPL
59128	1998 XA_{26}	—	December 14, 1998	Kitt Peak	Spacewatch	·	4.5 km	MPC · JPL
59129	1998 XC_{27}	—	December 15, 1998	Socorro	LINEAR	PHO	2.7 km	MPC · JPL
59130	1998 XU_{34}	—	December 14, 1998	Socorro	LINEAR	·	2.3 km	MPC · JPL
59131	1998 XA_{38}	—	December 14, 1998	Socorro	LINEAR	·	2.2 km	MPC · JPL
59132	1998 XM_{39}	—	December 14, 1998	Socorro	LINEAR	RAF	3.5 km	MPC · JPL
59133	1998 XM_{41}	—	December 14, 1998	Socorro	LINEAR	·	2.1 km	MPC · JPL
59134	1998 XR_{43}	—	December 14, 1998	Socorro	LINEAR	·	1.8 km	MPC · JPL
59135	1998 XN_{46}	—	December 14, 1998	Socorro	LINEAR	·	3.0 km	MPC · JPL
59136	1998 XZ_{49}	—	December 14, 1998	Socorro	LINEAR	·	8.7 km	MPC · JPL
59137	1998 XY_{50}	—	December 14, 1998	Socorro	LINEAR	·	1.7 km	MPC · JPL
59138	1998 XC_{52}	—	December 14, 1998	Socorro	LINEAR	·	1.6 km	MPC · JPL
59139	1998 XS_{59}	—	December 15, 1998	Socorro	LINEAR	NYS	1.7 km	MPC · JPL
59140	1998 XN_{60}	—	December 15, 1998	Socorro	LINEAR	(5)	3.2 km	MPC · JPL
59141	1998 XE_{61}	—	December 13, 1998	Kitt Peak	Spacewatch	ERI	4.1 km	MPC · JPL
59142	1998 XD_{62}	—	December 15, 1998	Kitt Peak	Spacewatch	PAD	3.6 km	MPC · JPL
59143	1998 XT_{72}	—	December 14, 1998	Socorro	LINEAR	·	5.9 km	MPC · JPL
59144	1998 XN_{73}	—	December 14, 1998	Socorro	LINEAR	·	2.6 km	MPC · JPL
59145	1998 XX_{73}	—	December 14, 1998	Socorro	LINEAR	·	3.3 km	MPC · JPL
59146	1998 XC_{74}	—	December 14, 1998	Socorro	LINEAR	·	2.5 km	MPC · JPL
59147	1998 XG_{77}	—	December 14, 1998	Socorro	LINEAR	·	2.2 km	MPC · JPL
59148	1998 XB_{78}	—	December 15, 1998	Socorro	LINEAR	·	4.8 km	MPC · JPL
59149	1998 XA_{84}	—	December 15, 1998	Socorro	LINEAR	·	3.5 km	MPC · JPL
59150	1998 XV_{90}	—	December 15, 1998	Socorro	LINEAR	HYG	8.8 km	MPC · JPL
59151	1998 XK_{96}	—	December 12, 1998	Mérida	Naranjo, O. A.	·	1.6 km	MPC · JPL
59152	1998 XN_{97}	—	December 8, 1998	Anderson Mesa	LONEOS	PHO	2.8 km	MPC · JPL
59153	1998 XV_{97}	—	December 11, 1998	Anderson Mesa	LONEOS	·	1.5 km	MPC · JPL
59154	1998 XP_{98}	—	December 13, 1998	Kitt Peak	Spacewatch	KOR	2.7 km	MPC · JPL
59155	1998 XL_{99}	—	December 15, 1998	Caussols	ODAS	·	4.4 km	MPC · JPL
59156	1998 YC_{3}	—	December 17, 1998	Oizumi	T. Kobayashi	·	2.2 km	MPC · JPL
59157	1998 YC_{4}	—	December 19, 1998	Oizumi	T. Kobayashi	·	2.2 km	MPC · JPL
59158	1998 YQ_{4}	—	December 20, 1998	Catalina	CSS	PHO	3.4 km	MPC · JPL
59159	1998 YX_{7}	—	December 24, 1998	Prescott	P. G. Comba	V	1.5 km	MPC · JPL
59160	1998 YF_{8}	—	December 24, 1998	Oizumi	T. Kobayashi	·	11 km	MPC · JPL
59161	1998 YL_{10}	—	December 27, 1998	Prescott	P. G. Comba	·	2.0 km	MPC · JPL
59162 Olivierbienaymé	1998 YX_{10}	Olivierbienaymé	December 18, 1998	Caussols	ODAS	·	4.5 km	MPC · JPL
59163	1998 YX_{11}	—	December 26, 1998	Oizumi	T. Kobayashi	·	1.6 km	MPC · JPL
59164	1998 YG_{12}	—	December 27, 1998	Oizumi	T. Kobayashi	NYS	2.6 km	MPC · JPL
59165	1998 YY_{13}	—	December 19, 1998	Kitt Peak	Spacewatch	KOR	3.2 km	MPC · JPL
59166	1998 YZ_{18}	—	December 25, 1998	Kitt Peak	Spacewatch	·	2.2 km	MPC · JPL
59167	1998 YC_{19}	—	December 25, 1998	Kitt Peak	Spacewatch	·	1.4 km	MPC · JPL
59168	1998 YU_{19}	—	December 25, 1998	Kitt Peak	Spacewatch	·	2.1 km	MPC · JPL
59169	1998 YJ_{26}	—	December 16, 1998	Socorro	LINEAR	·	3.4 km	MPC · JPL
59170	1998 YA_{27}	—	December 16, 1998	Socorro	LINEAR	·	2.1 km	MPC · JPL
59171	1999 AP_{2}	—	January 9, 1999	Oizumi	T. Kobayashi	·	3.6 km	MPC · JPL
59172	1999 AE_{3}	—	January 10, 1999	Baton Rouge	W. R. Cooney Jr.	·	2.5 km	MPC · JPL
59173	1999 AC_{5}	—	January 11, 1999	Oizumi	T. Kobayashi	·	3.6 km	MPC · JPL
59174	1999 AT_{5}	—	January 12, 1999	Oizumi	T. Kobayashi	·	5.8 km	MPC · JPL
59175	1999 AF_{6}	—	January 15, 1999	Kitt Peak	Spacewatch	·	7.3 km	MPC · JPL
59176	1999 AP_{7}	—	January 11, 1999	Višnjan Observatory	K. Korlević	·	3.0 km	MPC · JPL
59177	1999 AT_{7}	—	January 11, 1999	Gekko	T. Kagawa	·	2.8 km	MPC · JPL
59178	1999 AF_{8}	—	January 13, 1999	Oizumi	T. Kobayashi	·	4.8 km	MPC · JPL
59179	1999 AG_{8}	—	January 13, 1999	Oizumi	T. Kobayashi	V	2.2 km	MPC · JPL
59180	1999 AP_{12}	—	January 7, 1999	Kitt Peak	Spacewatch	·	2.2 km	MPC · JPL
59181	1999 AB_{13}	—	January 7, 1999	Kitt Peak	Spacewatch	ERI	3.3 km	MPC · JPL
59182	1999 AR_{13}	—	January 8, 1999	Kitt Peak	Spacewatch	GEF	2.8 km	MPC · JPL
59183	1999 AP_{15}	—	January 9, 1999	Kitt Peak	Spacewatch	·	2.7 km	MPC · JPL
59184	1999 AR_{15}	—	January 9, 1999	Kitt Peak	Spacewatch	·	2.5 km	MPC · JPL
59185	1999 AT_{15}	—	January 9, 1999	Kitt Peak	Spacewatch	·	2.5 km	MPC · JPL
59186	1999 AK_{16}	—	January 9, 1999	Kitt Peak	Spacewatch	NYS	2.4 km	MPC · JPL
59187	1999 AP_{17}	—	January 11, 1999	Kitt Peak	Spacewatch	·	2.1 km	MPC · JPL
59188	1999 AJ_{18}	—	January 11, 1999	Kitt Peak	Spacewatch	NYS	2.0 km	MPC · JPL
59189	1999 AU_{19}	—	January 13, 1999	Kitt Peak	Spacewatch	·	1.9 km	MPC · JPL
59190	1999 AZ_{21}	—	January 15, 1999	Višnjan Observatory	K. Korlević	·	5.9 km	MPC · JPL
59191	1999 AS_{24}	—	January 15, 1999	Caussols	ODAS	V	2.4 km	MPC · JPL
59192	1999 AU_{30}	—	January 14, 1999	Kitt Peak	Spacewatch	·	2.6 km	MPC · JPL
59193	1999 AJ_{31}	—	January 14, 1999	Kitt Peak	Spacewatch	MAS	1.5 km	MPC · JPL
59194	1999 BV_{1}	—	January 18, 1999	Višnjan Observatory	K. Korlević	NYS	1.5 km	MPC · JPL
59195	1999 BG_{2}	—	January 19, 1999	Catalina	CSS	·	6.3 km	MPC · JPL
59196	1999 BN_{2}	—	January 19, 1999	Kitt Peak	Spacewatch	·	1.2 km	MPC · JPL
59197	1999 BN_{3}	—	January 20, 1999	Kleť	Kleť	NYS	1.6 km	MPC · JPL
59198	1999 BT_{3}	—	January 19, 1999	Višnjan Observatory	K. Korlević	·	1.8 km	MPC · JPL
59199 Jorisbossard	1999 BH_{6}	Jorisbossard	January 20, 1999	Caussols	ODAS	V	1.9 km	MPC · JPL
59200	1999 BS_{7}	—	January 21, 1999	Višnjan Observatory	K. Korlević	·	2.3 km	MPC · JPL

== 59201–59300 ==
back to top

Designation			Discovery			Properties		Ref
Permanent	Provisional	Named after	Date	Site	Discoverer(s)	Category	Diam.	Ref
59201	1999 BW_{7}	—	January 21, 1999	Višnjan Observatory	K. Korlević	·	1.5 km	MPC · JPL
59202	1999 BB_{8}	—	January 21, 1999	Višnjan Observatory	K. Korlević	·	2.7 km	MPC · JPL
59203	1999 BC_{9}	—	January 22, 1999	Višnjan Observatory	K. Korlević	EUN	3.8 km	MPC · JPL
59204	1999 BF_{9}	—	January 22, 1999	Višnjan Observatory	K. Korlević	·	4.7 km	MPC · JPL
59205	1999 BD_{10}	—	January 23, 1999	Višnjan Observatory	K. Korlević	·	1.9 km	MPC · JPL
59206	1999 BE_{10}	—	January 23, 1999	Višnjan Observatory	K. Korlević	·	2.2 km	MPC · JPL
59207	1999 BD_{11}	—	January 20, 1999	Caussols	ODAS	·	1.8 km	MPC · JPL
59208	1999 BW_{12}	—	January 24, 1999	Višnjan Observatory	K. Korlević	·	1.7 km	MPC · JPL
59209	1999 BD_{13}	—	January 24, 1999	Višnjan Observatory	K. Korlević	V	2.2 km	MPC · JPL
59210	1999 BJ_{13}	—	January 25, 1999	Višnjan Observatory	K. Korlević	·	2.7 km	MPC · JPL
59211 Bernardfort	1999 BS_{13}	Bernardfort	January 20, 1999	Caussols	ODAS	MAS	1.6 km	MPC · JPL
59212	1999 BU_{13}	—	January 20, 1999	Caussols	ODAS	·	1.9 km	MPC · JPL
59213	1999 BO_{14}	—	January 25, 1999	High Point	D. K. Chesney	·	2.4 km	MPC · JPL
59214	1999 BX_{14}	—	January 20, 1999	Uenohara	N. Kawasato	NYS ·	4.1 km	MPC · JPL
59215	1999 BC_{15}	—	January 21, 1999	Višnjan Observatory	K. Korlević	·	1.9 km	MPC · JPL
59216	1999 BG_{15}	—	January 25, 1999	Višnjan Observatory	K. Korlević	·	4.3 km	MPC · JPL
59217	1999 BK_{19}	—	January 16, 1999	Socorro	LINEAR	·	2.3 km	MPC · JPL
59218	1999 BE_{20}	—	January 16, 1999	Socorro	LINEAR	EOS	5.2 km	MPC · JPL
59219	1999 BJ_{23}	—	January 18, 1999	Socorro	LINEAR	·	7.6 km	MPC · JPL
59220	1999 BX_{25}	—	January 18, 1999	Socorro	LINEAR	·	2.3 km	MPC · JPL
59221	1999 BU_{29}	—	January 18, 1999	Kitt Peak	Spacewatch	·	2.2 km	MPC · JPL
59222	1999 BT_{31}	—	January 19, 1999	Kitt Peak	Spacewatch	NYS	1.6 km	MPC · JPL
59223	1999 BV_{32}	—	January 19, 1999	Kitt Peak	Spacewatch	·	1.8 km	MPC · JPL
59224	1999 BS_{34}	—	January 19, 1999	Socorro	LINEAR	·	1.7 km	MPC · JPL
59225	1999 CC	—	February 4, 1999	Oizumi	T. Kobayashi	·	2.7 km	MPC · JPL
59226	1999 CE	—	February 4, 1999	Oizumi	T. Kobayashi	V	2.6 km	MPC · JPL
59227	1999 CG	—	February 4, 1999	Oizumi	T. Kobayashi	·	2.2 km	MPC · JPL
59228	1999 CH	—	February 4, 1999	Oizumi	T. Kobayashi	V	2.7 km	MPC · JPL
59229	1999 CQ	—	February 5, 1999	Oizumi	T. Kobayashi	NYS	2.7 km	MPC · JPL
59230	1999 CY	—	February 5, 1999	Oizumi	T. Kobayashi	·	2.5 km	MPC · JPL
59231	1999 CZ	—	February 5, 1999	Oizumi	T. Kobayashi	·	2.9 km	MPC · JPL
59232 Sfiligoi	1999 CA_{1}	Sfiligoi	February 6, 1999	Farra d'Isonzo	Farra d'Isonzo	·	4.3 km	MPC · JPL
59233	1999 CH_{1}	—	February 6, 1999	Oizumi	T. Kobayashi	PHO · slow	3.6 km	MPC · JPL
59234	1999 CR_{1}	—	February 7, 1999	Oizumi	T. Kobayashi	·	4.4 km	MPC · JPL
59235	1999 CV_{1}	—	February 7, 1999	Oizumi	T. Kobayashi	·	3.0 km	MPC · JPL
59236	1999 CD_{2}	—	February 8, 1999	Oizumi	T. Kobayashi	·	3.9 km	MPC · JPL
59237	1999 CF_{2}	—	February 8, 1999	Ondřejov	L. Kotková	·	1.6 km	MPC · JPL
59238 Lilin	1999 CN_{2}	Lilin	February 5, 1999	Xinglong	SCAP	MAS	2.0 km	MPC · JPL
59239 Alhazen	1999 CR_{2}	Alhazen	February 7, 1999	Gnosca	S. Sposetti	·	3.1 km	MPC · JPL
59240	1999 CY_{2}	—	February 7, 1999	San Marcello	A. Boattini	NYS ·	4.4 km	MPC · JPL
59241	1999 CC_{4}	—	February 6, 1999	Xinglong	SCAP	·	2.7 km	MPC · JPL
59242	1999 CS_{4}	—	February 12, 1999	Višnjan Observatory	K. Korlević	NYS	3.4 km	MPC · JPL
59243	1999 CZ_{4}	—	February 12, 1999	Oohira	T. Urata	·	2.3 km	MPC · JPL
59244	1999 CG_{6}	—	February 10, 1999	Socorro	LINEAR	·	7.2 km	MPC · JPL
59245	1999 CT_{7}	—	February 10, 1999	Socorro	LINEAR	PHO	3.2 km	MPC · JPL
59246	1999 CQ_{8}	—	February 12, 1999	Višnjan Observatory	K. Korlević	·	2.6 km	MPC · JPL
59247	1999 CU_{11}	—	February 12, 1999	Socorro	LINEAR	·	5.8 km	MPC · JPL
59248 Genevièvesoucail	1999 CG_{13}	Genevièvesoucail	February 14, 1999	Caussols	ODAS	·	2.7 km	MPC · JPL
59249	1999 CZ_{15}	—	February 11, 1999	Socorro	LINEAR	·	3.1 km	MPC · JPL
59250	1999 CD_{16}	—	February 11, 1999	Socorro	LINEAR	PHO	2.4 km	MPC · JPL
59251	1999 CG_{21}	—	February 10, 1999	Socorro	LINEAR	·	1.8 km	MPC · JPL
59252	1999 CE_{25}	—	February 10, 1999	Socorro	LINEAR	·	3.9 km	MPC · JPL
59253	1999 CH_{25}	—	February 10, 1999	Socorro	LINEAR	NYS ·	3.6 km	MPC · JPL
59254	1999 CL_{25}	—	February 10, 1999	Socorro	LINEAR	·	4.8 km	MPC · JPL
59255	1999 CB_{26}	—	February 10, 1999	Socorro	LINEAR	MAS	2.1 km	MPC · JPL
59256	1999 CG_{27}	—	February 10, 1999	Socorro	LINEAR	V	2.0 km	MPC · JPL
59257	1999 CO_{27}	—	February 10, 1999	Socorro	LINEAR	·	2.2 km	MPC · JPL
59258	1999 CD_{29}	—	February 10, 1999	Socorro	LINEAR	NYS	2.5 km	MPC · JPL
59259	1999 CP_{29}	—	February 10, 1999	Socorro	LINEAR	·	2.2 km	MPC · JPL
59260	1999 CR_{29}	—	February 10, 1999	Socorro	LINEAR	·	2.2 km	MPC · JPL
59261	1999 CX_{29}	—	February 10, 1999	Socorro	LINEAR	·	6.3 km	MPC · JPL
59262	1999 CY_{29}	—	February 10, 1999	Socorro	LINEAR	·	2.0 km	MPC · JPL
59263	1999 CK_{30}	—	February 10, 1999	Socorro	LINEAR	MAS	1.9 km	MPC · JPL
59264	1999 CL_{30}	—	February 10, 1999	Socorro	LINEAR	·	2.6 km	MPC · JPL
59265	1999 CJ_{31}	—	February 10, 1999	Socorro	LINEAR	·	2.2 km	MPC · JPL
59266	1999 CD_{32}	—	February 10, 1999	Socorro	LINEAR	V	1.9 km	MPC · JPL
59267	1999 CR_{32}	—	February 10, 1999	Socorro	LINEAR	V	1.7 km	MPC · JPL
59268	1999 CU_{34}	—	February 10, 1999	Socorro	LINEAR	·	2.2 km	MPC · JPL
59269	1999 CL_{36}	—	February 10, 1999	Socorro	LINEAR	·	2.2 km	MPC · JPL
59270	1999 CT_{37}	—	February 10, 1999	Socorro	LINEAR	·	2.0 km	MPC · JPL
59271	1999 CG_{38}	—	February 10, 1999	Socorro	LINEAR	·	2.0 km	MPC · JPL
59272	1999 CN_{38}	—	February 10, 1999	Socorro	LINEAR	·	2.5 km	MPC · JPL
59273	1999 CG_{39}	—	February 10, 1999	Socorro	LINEAR	·	3.8 km	MPC · JPL
59274	1999 CL_{42}	—	February 10, 1999	Socorro	LINEAR	·	1.7 km	MPC · JPL
59275	1999 CC_{43}	—	February 10, 1999	Socorro	LINEAR	·	5.2 km	MPC · JPL
59276	1999 CF_{45}	—	February 10, 1999	Socorro	LINEAR	V	2.7 km	MPC · JPL
59277	1999 CG_{45}	—	February 10, 1999	Socorro	LINEAR	·	2.3 km	MPC · JPL
59278	1999 CT_{45}	—	February 10, 1999	Socorro	LINEAR	·	5.0 km	MPC · JPL
59279	1999 CA_{46}	—	February 10, 1999	Socorro	LINEAR	·	1.5 km	MPC · JPL
59280	1999 CL_{48}	—	February 10, 1999	Socorro	LINEAR	·	2.0 km	MPC · JPL
59281	1999 CX_{48}	—	February 10, 1999	Socorro	LINEAR	·	2.8 km	MPC · JPL
59282	1999 CG_{49}	—	February 10, 1999	Socorro	LINEAR	·	2.0 km	MPC · JPL
59283	1999 CF_{50}	—	February 10, 1999	Socorro	LINEAR	·	3.1 km	MPC · JPL
59284	1999 CM_{50}	—	February 10, 1999	Socorro	LINEAR	·	2.1 km	MPC · JPL
59285	1999 CP_{50}	—	February 10, 1999	Socorro	LINEAR	·	3.8 km	MPC · JPL
59286	1999 CV_{51}	—	February 10, 1999	Socorro	LINEAR	(5)	3.5 km	MPC · JPL
59287	1999 CC_{54}	—	February 10, 1999	Socorro	LINEAR	EOS	7.7 km	MPC · JPL
59288	1999 CQ_{54}	—	February 10, 1999	Socorro	LINEAR	·	2.1 km	MPC · JPL
59289	1999 CA_{55}	—	February 10, 1999	Socorro	LINEAR	·	2.0 km	MPC · JPL
59290	1999 CC_{55}	—	February 10, 1999	Socorro	LINEAR	·	2.6 km	MPC · JPL
59291	1999 CJ_{56}	—	February 10, 1999	Socorro	LINEAR	·	3.1 km	MPC · JPL
59292	1999 CN_{56}	—	February 10, 1999	Socorro	LINEAR	·	3.5 km	MPC · JPL
59293	1999 CM_{57}	—	February 10, 1999	Socorro	LINEAR	·	5.0 km	MPC · JPL
59294	1999 CY_{58}	—	February 10, 1999	Socorro	LINEAR	·	2.0 km	MPC · JPL
59295	1999 CK_{59}	—	February 10, 1999	Socorro	LINEAR	V	1.6 km	MPC · JPL
59296	1999 CU_{64}	—	February 12, 1999	Socorro	LINEAR	·	8.0 km	MPC · JPL
59297	1999 CD_{66}	—	February 12, 1999	Socorro	LINEAR	·	2.2 km	MPC · JPL
59298	1999 CQ_{66}	—	February 12, 1999	Socorro	LINEAR	V	2.3 km	MPC · JPL
59299	1999 CE_{68}	—	February 12, 1999	Socorro	LINEAR	V	2.1 km	MPC · JPL
59300	1999 CW_{71}	—	February 12, 1999	Socorro	LINEAR	·	1.6 km	MPC · JPL

== 59301–59400 ==
back to top

Designation			Discovery			Properties		Ref
Permanent	Provisional	Named after	Date	Site	Discoverer(s)	Category	Diam.	Ref
59301	1999 CB_{73}	—	February 12, 1999	Socorro	LINEAR	·	3.6 km	MPC · JPL
59302	1999 CF_{74}	—	February 12, 1999	Socorro	LINEAR	·	2.0 km	MPC · JPL
59303	1999 CX_{75}	—	February 12, 1999	Socorro	LINEAR	·	2.5 km	MPC · JPL
59304	1999 CJ_{76}	—	February 12, 1999	Socorro	LINEAR	NYS	1.9 km	MPC · JPL
59305	1999 CD_{78}	—	February 12, 1999	Socorro	LINEAR	·	2.7 km	MPC · JPL
59306	1999 CN_{79}	—	February 12, 1999	Socorro	LINEAR	·	2.7 km	MPC · JPL
59307	1999 CT_{79}	—	February 12, 1999	Socorro	LINEAR	·	2.7 km	MPC · JPL
59308	1999 CQ_{83}	—	February 10, 1999	Socorro	LINEAR	EUN	3.0 km	MPC · JPL
59309	1999 CY_{84}	—	February 10, 1999	Socorro	LINEAR	·	2.1 km	MPC · JPL
59310	1999 CA_{87}	—	February 10, 1999	Socorro	LINEAR	·	2.7 km	MPC · JPL
59311	1999 CJ_{87}	—	February 10, 1999	Socorro	LINEAR	·	2.0 km	MPC · JPL
59312	1999 CR_{87}	—	February 10, 1999	Socorro	LINEAR	NYS	1.8 km	MPC · JPL
59313	1999 CF_{88}	—	February 10, 1999	Socorro	LINEAR	DOR	9.3 km	MPC · JPL
59314	1999 CP_{88}	—	February 10, 1999	Socorro	LINEAR	·	3.9 km	MPC · JPL
59315	1999 CC_{89}	—	February 10, 1999	Socorro	LINEAR	·	1.7 km	MPC · JPL
59316	1999 CL_{89}	—	February 10, 1999	Socorro	LINEAR	(5)	2.7 km	MPC · JPL
59317	1999 CN_{89}	—	February 10, 1999	Socorro	LINEAR	NYS	4.0 km	MPC · JPL
59318	1999 CB_{90}	—	February 10, 1999	Socorro	LINEAR	·	2.9 km	MPC · JPL
59319	1999 CT_{91}	—	February 10, 1999	Socorro	LINEAR	·	3.7 km	MPC · JPL
59320	1999 CH_{92}	—	February 10, 1999	Socorro	LINEAR	V	2.0 km	MPC · JPL
59321	1999 CF_{93}	—	February 10, 1999	Socorro	LINEAR	·	2.8 km	MPC · JPL
59322	1999 CB_{95}	—	February 10, 1999	Socorro	LINEAR	NYS	2.8 km	MPC · JPL
59323	1999 CS_{95}	—	February 10, 1999	Socorro	LINEAR	·	2.5 km	MPC · JPL
59324	1999 CF_{97}	—	February 10, 1999	Socorro	LINEAR	NYS ·	3.1 km	MPC · JPL
59325	1999 CZ_{97}	—	February 10, 1999	Socorro	LINEAR	·	3.6 km	MPC · JPL
59326	1999 CO_{98}	—	February 10, 1999	Socorro	LINEAR	·	3.3 km	MPC · JPL
59327	1999 CG_{99}	—	February 10, 1999	Socorro	LINEAR	·	2.5 km	MPC · JPL
59328	1999 CM_{102}	—	February 12, 1999	Socorro	LINEAR	·	3.4 km	MPC · JPL
59329	1999 CN_{102}	—	February 12, 1999	Socorro	LINEAR	·	2.4 km	MPC · JPL
59330	1999 CW_{103}	—	February 12, 1999	Socorro	LINEAR	·	2.5 km	MPC · JPL
59331	1999 CC_{104}	—	February 12, 1999	Socorro	LINEAR	·	4.8 km	MPC · JPL
59332	1999 CQ_{104}	—	February 12, 1999	Socorro	LINEAR	·	6.2 km	MPC · JPL
59333	1999 CM_{105}	—	February 12, 1999	Socorro	LINEAR	·	4.1 km	MPC · JPL
59334	1999 CY_{105}	—	February 12, 1999	Socorro	LINEAR	·	2.7 km	MPC · JPL
59335	1999 CR_{106}	—	February 12, 1999	Socorro	LINEAR	·	3.8 km	MPC · JPL
59336	1999 CR_{110}	—	February 12, 1999	Socorro	LINEAR	V	2.6 km	MPC · JPL
59337	1999 CT_{111}	—	February 12, 1999	Socorro	LINEAR	EOS ·	6.0 km	MPC · JPL
59338	1999 CV_{111}	—	February 12, 1999	Socorro	LINEAR	·	5.4 km	MPC · JPL
59339	1999 CT_{113}	—	February 12, 1999	Socorro	LINEAR	·	2.0 km	MPC · JPL
59340	1999 CV_{116}	—	February 12, 1999	Socorro	LINEAR	·	5.8 km	MPC · JPL
59341	1999 CY_{116}	—	February 12, 1999	Socorro	LINEAR	·	2.7 km	MPC · JPL
59342	1999 CS_{118}	—	February 9, 1999	Xinglong	SCAP	PHO	3.9 km	MPC · JPL
59343	1999 CA_{123}	—	February 11, 1999	Socorro	LINEAR	·	4.3 km	MPC · JPL
59344	1999 CW_{123}	—	February 11, 1999	Socorro	LINEAR	·	4.3 km	MPC · JPL
59345	1999 CK_{135}	—	February 8, 1999	Kitt Peak	Spacewatch	V	2.0 km	MPC · JPL
59346	1999 CC_{137}	—	February 9, 1999	Kitt Peak	Spacewatch	·	2.5 km	MPC · JPL
59347	1999 CX_{137}	—	February 9, 1999	Kitt Peak	Spacewatch	·	3.2 km	MPC · JPL
59348	1999 CU_{141}	—	February 10, 1999	Kitt Peak	Spacewatch	·	1.4 km	MPC · JPL
59349	1999 CN_{142}	—	February 10, 1999	Kitt Peak	Spacewatch	·	1.7 km	MPC · JPL
59350	1999 CT_{142}	—	February 10, 1999	Kitt Peak	Spacewatch	·	2.0 km	MPC · JPL
59351	1999 CQ_{145}	—	February 8, 1999	Kitt Peak	Spacewatch	·	3.1 km	MPC · JPL
59352	1999 CH_{147}	—	February 9, 1999	Kitt Peak	Spacewatch	·	2.3 km	MPC · JPL
59353	1999 CE_{151}	—	February 9, 1999	Kitt Peak	Spacewatch	·	3.2 km	MPC · JPL
59354	1999 CF_{152}	—	February 12, 1999	Kitt Peak	Spacewatch	·	2.8 km	MPC · JPL
59355	1999 CL_{153}	—	February 14, 1999	Kitt Peak	Spacewatch	L4	10 km	MPC · JPL
59356	1999 CX_{153}	—	February 13, 1999	Anderson Mesa	LONEOS	·	2.3 km	MPC · JPL
59357	1999 CB_{154}	—	February 14, 1999	Anderson Mesa	LONEOS	·	2.2 km	MPC · JPL
59358	1999 CL_{158}	—	February 11, 1999	Mauna Kea	J. X. Luu, C. A. Trujillo, D. C. Jewitt	cubewano (hot)	196 km	MPC · JPL
59359	1999 DV	—	February 16, 1999	Gekko	T. Kagawa	·	2.5 km	MPC · JPL
59360	1999 DY_{1}	—	February 18, 1999	Haleakala	NEAT	·	2.7 km	MPC · JPL
59361	1999 DW_{2}	—	February 20, 1999	Oohira	T. Urata	·	2.3 km	MPC · JPL
59362	1999 DO_{5}	—	February 17, 1999	Socorro	LINEAR	MAR	3.1 km	MPC · JPL
59363	1999 DP_{7}	—	February 18, 1999	Anderson Mesa	LONEOS	·	3.7 km	MPC · JPL
59364	1999 DS_{7}	—	February 18, 1999	Anderson Mesa	LONEOS	V	2.8 km	MPC · JPL
59365	1999 EM	—	March 9, 1999	Fountain Hills	C. W. Juels	NYS	2.2 km	MPC · JPL
59366	1999 EE_{3}	—	March 12, 1999	Prescott	P. G. Comba	EOS	4.8 km	MPC · JPL
59367	1999 EQ_{3}	—	March 15, 1999	Prescott	P. G. Comba	NYS	1.9 km	MPC · JPL
59368	1999 EP_{4}	—	March 12, 1999	Kitt Peak	Spacewatch	·	5.1 km	MPC · JPL
59369 Chanco	1999 EB_{5}	Chanco	March 11, 1999	Uccle	T. Pauwels	·	5.1 km	MPC · JPL
59370	1999 EK_{5}	—	March 15, 1999	King City, Ontario Observatory	Sandness, R. G.	·	2.3 km	MPC · JPL
59371	1999 EY_{6}	—	March 14, 1999	Kitt Peak	Spacewatch	·	8.3 km	MPC · JPL
59372	1999 EP_{8}	—	March 14, 1999	Kitt Peak	Spacewatch	NYS	1.6 km	MPC · JPL
59373	1999 ET_{10}	—	March 14, 1999	Kitt Peak	Spacewatch	NYS	3.7 km	MPC · JPL
59374	1999 EO_{12}	—	March 15, 1999	Socorro	LINEAR	·	3.3 km	MPC · JPL
59375	1999 EQ_{13}	—	March 10, 1999	Kitt Peak	Spacewatch	EOS	4.3 km	MPC · JPL
59376	1999 FK	—	March 17, 1999	Farra d'Isonzo	Farra d'Isonzo	V	2.3 km	MPC · JPL
59377	1999 FF_{1}	—	March 17, 1999	Caussols	ODAS	·	6.2 km	MPC · JPL
59378	1999 FV_{3}	—	March 19, 1999	Modra	Galád, A., Tóth	·	5.3 km	MPC · JPL
59379	1999 FO_{4}	—	March 17, 1999	Kitt Peak	Spacewatch	·	2.8 km	MPC · JPL
59380	1999 FA_{5}	—	March 17, 1999	Kitt Peak	Spacewatch	·	2.8 km	MPC · JPL
59381 Yannickmellier	1999 FZ_{5}	Yannickmellier	March 16, 1999	Caussols	ODAS	NYS	3.9 km	MPC · JPL
59382	1999 FP_{6}	—	March 17, 1999	Caussols	ODAS	·	2.0 km	MPC · JPL
59383	1999 FY_{9}	—	March 22, 1999	Anderson Mesa	LONEOS	NYS	2.0 km	MPC · JPL
59384 Tomgiovannetti	1999 FH_{10}	Tomgiovannetti	March 22, 1999	San Marcello	L. Tesi, A. Boattini	·	4.1 km	MPC · JPL
59385	1999 FH_{15}	—	March 19, 1999	Kitt Peak	Spacewatch	·	2.8 km	MPC · JPL
59386	1999 FJ_{17}	—	March 23, 1999	Kitt Peak	Spacewatch	·	4.8 km	MPC · JPL
59387	1999 FZ_{17}	—	March 23, 1999	Kitt Peak	Spacewatch	·	2.0 km	MPC · JPL
59388 Monod	1999 FU_{19}	Monod	March 24, 1999	Monte Agliale	Santangelo, M. M. M.	·	2.0 km	MPC · JPL
59389 Oskarvonmiller	1999 FF_{21}	Oskarvonmiller	March 24, 1999	Modra	Kornoš, L., Tóth	·	2.7 km	MPC · JPL
59390 Habermas	1999 FR_{21}	Habermas	March 24, 1999	Monte Agliale	Santangelo, M. M. M.	·	5.5 km	MPC · JPL
59391	1999 FC_{22}	—	March 19, 1999	Socorro	LINEAR	·	3.1 km	MPC · JPL
59392	1999 FD_{23}	—	March 19, 1999	Socorro	LINEAR	NYS	1.8 km	MPC · JPL
59393	1999 FG_{23}	—	March 19, 1999	Socorro	LINEAR	·	3.2 km	MPC · JPL
59394	1999 FZ_{23}	—	March 19, 1999	Socorro	LINEAR	·	3.0 km	MPC · JPL
59395	1999 FM_{25}	—	March 19, 1999	Socorro	LINEAR	·	1.8 km	MPC · JPL
59396	1999 FY_{25}	—	March 19, 1999	Socorro	LINEAR	(2076)	1.9 km	MPC · JPL
59397	1999 FT_{26}	—	March 19, 1999	Socorro	LINEAR	NYS	2.9 km	MPC · JPL
59398	1999 FF_{29}	—	March 19, 1999	Socorro	LINEAR	·	2.5 km	MPC · JPL
59399	1999 FK_{30}	—	March 19, 1999	Socorro	LINEAR	·	3.1 km	MPC · JPL
59400	1999 FH_{31}	—	March 19, 1999	Socorro	LINEAR	·	6.3 km	MPC · JPL

== 59401–59500 ==
back to top

Designation			Discovery			Properties		Ref
Permanent	Provisional	Named after	Date	Site	Discoverer(s)	Category	Diam.	Ref
59401	1999 FC_{32}	—	March 19, 1999	Socorro	LINEAR	·	3.2 km	MPC · JPL
59402	1999 FR_{32}	—	March 23, 1999	Višnjan Observatory	K. Korlević	·	5.2 km	MPC · JPL
59403	1999 FV_{34}	—	March 19, 1999	Socorro	LINEAR	EUN	3.4 km	MPC · JPL
59404	1999 FW_{34}	—	March 19, 1999	Socorro	LINEAR	GEF	4.8 km	MPC · JPL
59405	1999 FA_{35}	—	March 19, 1999	Socorro	LINEAR	MAR	2.8 km	MPC · JPL
59406	1999 FM_{35}	—	March 20, 1999	Socorro	LINEAR	·	3.2 km	MPC · JPL
59407	1999 FC_{38}	—	March 20, 1999	Socorro	LINEAR	·	2.3 km	MPC · JPL
59408	1999 FL_{40}	—	March 20, 1999	Socorro	LINEAR	·	3.1 km	MPC · JPL
59409	1999 FX_{42}	—	March 20, 1999	Socorro	LINEAR	·	3.9 km	MPC · JPL
59410	1999 FH_{50}	—	March 20, 1999	Socorro	LINEAR	V	1.8 km	MPC · JPL
59411	1999 FX_{50}	—	March 20, 1999	Socorro	LINEAR	V	3.8 km	MPC · JPL
59412	1999 FU_{51}	—	March 20, 1999	Socorro	LINEAR	NYS ·	4.7 km	MPC · JPL
59413	1999 FN_{58}	—	March 20, 1999	Socorro	LINEAR	V	1.6 km	MPC · JPL
59414	1999 FP_{62}	—	March 22, 1999	Anderson Mesa	LONEOS	·	2.6 km	MPC · JPL
59415	1999 GJ	—	April 4, 1999	Modra	Galád, A., Tóth	NYS	3.0 km	MPC · JPL
59416	1999 GM	—	April 5, 1999	Višnjan Observatory	K. Korlević	·	1.8 km	MPC · JPL
59417 Giocasilli	1999 GD_{1}	Giocasilli	April 5, 1999	San Marcello	A. Boattini, L. Tesi	·	1.9 km	MPC · JPL
59418	1999 GJ_{1}	—	April 7, 1999	Oizumi	T. Kobayashi	·	2.7 km	MPC · JPL
59419 Prešov	1999 GE_{2}	Prešov	April 9, 1999	Modra	L. Kornoš, Gajdoš, S.	·	3.3 km	MPC · JPL
59420	1999 GR_{2}	—	April 9, 1999	Oaxaca	Roe, J. M.	NYS ·	5.7 km	MPC · JPL
59421	1999 GV_{3}	—	April 5, 1999	San Marcello	G. D'Abramo, A. Boattini	·	3.6 km	MPC · JPL
59422	1999 GD_{4}	—	April 12, 1999	Woomera	F. B. Zoltowski	PHO	4.0 km	MPC · JPL
59423	1999 GE_{4}	—	April 12, 1999	Woomera	F. B. Zoltowski	·	6.2 km	MPC · JPL
59424	1999 GP_{4}	—	April 10, 1999	Višnjan Observatory	K. Korlević	·	5.3 km	MPC · JPL
59425 Xuyangsheng	1999 GJ_{5}	Xuyangsheng	April 7, 1999	Xinglong	SCAP	·	3.4 km	MPC · JPL
59426	1999 GS_{5}	—	April 15, 1999	Fountain Hills	C. W. Juels	NYS ·	5.6 km	MPC · JPL
59427	1999 GM_{6}	—	April 14, 1999	Xinglong	SCAP	·	2.4 km	MPC · JPL
59428	1999 GK_{7}	—	April 7, 1999	Anderson Mesa	LONEOS	·	1.5 km	MPC · JPL
59429	1999 GK_{8}	—	April 9, 1999	Anderson Mesa	LONEOS	·	2.7 km	MPC · JPL
59430	1999 GT_{12}	—	April 12, 1999	Kitt Peak	Spacewatch	·	8.7 km	MPC · JPL
59431	1999 GG_{13}	—	April 12, 1999	Kitt Peak	Spacewatch	·	2.1 km	MPC · JPL
59432	1999 GW_{14}	—	April 14, 1999	Kitt Peak	Spacewatch	·	3.8 km	MPC · JPL
59433	1999 GH_{17}	—	April 15, 1999	Socorro	LINEAR	·	2.2 km	MPC · JPL
59434	1999 GR_{18}	—	April 15, 1999	Socorro	LINEAR	slow	6.7 km	MPC · JPL
59435	1999 GE_{20}	—	April 15, 1999	Socorro	LINEAR	RAF	2.8 km	MPC · JPL
59436	1999 GE_{21}	—	April 15, 1999	Socorro	LINEAR	PHO	6.7 km	MPC · JPL
59437	1999 GY_{21}	—	April 7, 1999	Socorro	LINEAR	·	4.7 km	MPC · JPL
59438	1999 GA_{22}	—	April 7, 1999	Socorro	LINEAR	·	3.1 km	MPC · JPL
59439	1999 GS_{23}	—	April 6, 1999	Socorro	LINEAR	EUN	4.3 km	MPC · JPL
59440	1999 GL_{24}	—	April 6, 1999	Socorro	LINEAR	NYS	1.6 km	MPC · JPL
59441	1999 GZ_{29}	—	April 7, 1999	Socorro	LINEAR	·	2.9 km	MPC · JPL
59442	1999 GS_{30}	—	April 7, 1999	Socorro	LINEAR	NYS	3.3 km	MPC · JPL
59443	1999 GV_{30}	—	April 7, 1999	Socorro	LINEAR	EUN	2.9 km	MPC · JPL
59444	1999 GY_{30}	—	April 7, 1999	Socorro	LINEAR	·	1.8 km	MPC · JPL
59445	1999 GJ_{32}	—	April 7, 1999	Socorro	LINEAR	·	3.9 km	MPC · JPL
59446	1999 GO_{32}	—	April 7, 1999	Socorro	LINEAR	NYS	2.9 km	MPC · JPL
59447	1999 GV_{32}	—	April 10, 1999	Socorro	LINEAR	PHO	2.5 km	MPC · JPL
59448	1999 GC_{33}	—	April 12, 1999	Socorro	LINEAR	·	4.2 km	MPC · JPL
59449	1999 GH_{33}	—	April 12, 1999	Socorro	LINEAR	EUN	3.6 km	MPC · JPL
59450	1999 GW_{33}	—	April 12, 1999	Socorro	LINEAR	·	1.9 km	MPC · JPL
59451	1999 GX_{33}	—	April 12, 1999	Socorro	LINEAR	·	6.3 km	MPC · JPL
59452	1999 GS_{34}	—	April 6, 1999	Socorro	LINEAR	HYG	9.4 km	MPC · JPL
59453	1999 GN_{35}	—	April 7, 1999	Socorro	LINEAR	·	2.7 km	MPC · JPL
59454	1999 GO_{35}	—	April 7, 1999	Socorro	LINEAR	·	3.0 km	MPC · JPL
59455	1999 GK_{36}	—	April 7, 1999	Socorro	LINEAR	NYS	2.9 km	MPC · JPL
59456	1999 GJ_{38}	—	April 12, 1999	Socorro	LINEAR	·	1.8 km	MPC · JPL
59457	1999 GF_{39}	—	April 12, 1999	Socorro	LINEAR	·	4.8 km	MPC · JPL
59458	1999 GM_{41}	—	April 12, 1999	Socorro	LINEAR	·	2.2 km	MPC · JPL
59459	1999 GV_{42}	—	April 12, 1999	Socorro	LINEAR	EOS	5.8 km	MPC · JPL
59460	1999 GR_{43}	—	April 12, 1999	Socorro	LINEAR	·	2.1 km	MPC · JPL
59461	1999 GO_{45}	—	April 12, 1999	Socorro	LINEAR	MAR	3.7 km	MPC · JPL
59462	1999 GQ_{45}	—	April 12, 1999	Socorro	LINEAR	·	3.6 km	MPC · JPL
59463	1999 GV_{45}	—	April 12, 1999	Socorro	LINEAR	·	10 km	MPC · JPL
59464	1999 GM_{50}	—	April 10, 1999	Anderson Mesa	LONEOS	·	3.2 km	MPC · JPL
59465	1999 GS_{51}	—	April 11, 1999	Anderson Mesa	LONEOS	·	8.2 km	MPC · JPL
59466	1999 GE_{54}	—	April 13, 1999	Xinglong	SCAP	MAS	1.4 km	MPC · JPL
59467	1999 GQ_{57}	—	April 6, 1999	Socorro	LINEAR	·	5.8 km	MPC · JPL
59468	1999 GH_{61}	—	April 15, 1999	Socorro	LINEAR	·	3.5 km	MPC · JPL
59469	1999 GJ_{61}	—	April 15, 1999	Socorro	LINEAR	·	2.9 km	MPC · JPL
59470 Paveltoufar	1999 HM	Paveltoufar	April 17, 1999	Ondřejov	P. Pravec	·	2.4 km	MPC · JPL
59471	1999 HP	—	April 17, 1999	Woomera	F. B. Zoltowski	·	2.3 km	MPC · JPL
59472	1999 HX	—	April 19, 1999	Reedy Creek	J. Broughton	·	6.5 km	MPC · JPL
59473	1999 HT_{1}	—	April 19, 1999	Višnjan Observatory	Višnjan	·	5.4 km	MPC · JPL
59474	1999 HK_{2}	—	April 20, 1999	Višnjan Observatory	K. Korlević, M. Jurić	·	5.8 km	MPC · JPL
59475	1999 HN_{2}	—	April 19, 1999	Višnjan Observatory	K. Korlević, M. Jurić	·	4.1 km	MPC · JPL
59476	1999 HQ_{2}	—	April 21, 1999	Hawker	Child, J. B.	·	2.0 km	MPC · JPL
59477	1999 HP_{3}	—	April 18, 1999	Catalina	CSS	EMA	9.2 km	MPC · JPL
59478	1999 HR_{4}	—	April 16, 1999	Kitt Peak	Spacewatch	·	6.3 km	MPC · JPL
59479	1999 HX_{5}	—	April 17, 1999	Kitt Peak	Spacewatch	·	4.0 km	MPC · JPL
59480	1999 HJ_{7}	—	April 19, 1999	Kitt Peak	Spacewatch	EOS	5.9 km	MPC · JPL
59481	1999 HX_{8}	—	April 17, 1999	Socorro	LINEAR	·	4.3 km	MPC · JPL
59482	1999 HP_{10}	—	April 17, 1999	Socorro	LINEAR	DOR	5.4 km	MPC · JPL
59483 Corranplain	1999 HN_{11}	Corranplain	April 16, 1999	Catalina	CSS	·	7.1 km	MPC · JPL
59484	1999 JJ	—	May 6, 1999	Socorro	LINEAR	H	1.9 km	MPC · JPL
59485	1999 JR	—	May 4, 1999	Xinglong	SCAP	EUN	3.0 km	MPC · JPL
59486	1999 JV	—	May 5, 1999	Xinglong	SCAP	·	3.6 km	MPC · JPL
59487	1999 JZ_{1}	—	May 8, 1999	Catalina	CSS	·	4.3 km	MPC · JPL
59488	1999 JE_{2}	—	May 8, 1999	Catalina	CSS	·	7.0 km	MPC · JPL
59489	1999 JQ_{2}	—	May 8, 1999	Catalina	CSS	·	3.4 km	MPC · JPL
59490	1999 JD_{4}	—	May 10, 1999	Socorro	LINEAR	·	3.3 km	MPC · JPL
59491	1999 JO_{4}	—	May 10, 1999	Socorro	LINEAR	·	2.8 km	MPC · JPL
59492	1999 JU_{4}	—	May 10, 1999	Socorro	LINEAR	·	4.3 km	MPC · JPL
59493	1999 JG_{5}	—	May 10, 1999	Socorro	LINEAR	H	2.0 km	MPC · JPL
59494	1999 JN_{5}	—	May 10, 1999	Socorro	LINEAR	·	4.0 km	MPC · JPL
59495	1999 JB_{6}	—	May 6, 1999	Majorca	Á. López J., R. Pacheco	·	4.1 km	MPC · JPL
59496	1999 JY_{6}	—	May 8, 1999	Catalina	CSS	·	3.1 km	MPC · JPL
59497	1999 JJ_{7}	—	May 8, 1999	Catalina	CSS	·	4.0 km	MPC · JPL
59498	1999 JG_{8}	—	May 12, 1999	Socorro	LINEAR	PHO	3.6 km	MPC · JPL
59499	1999 JP_{8}	—	May 14, 1999	Catalina	CSS	·	6.7 km	MPC · JPL
59500	1999 JT_{8}	—	May 14, 1999	Reedy Creek	J. Broughton	·	2.5 km	MPC · JPL

== 59501–59600 ==
back to top

Designation			Discovery			Properties		Ref
Permanent	Provisional	Named after	Date	Site	Discoverer(s)	Category	Diam.	Ref
59501	1999 JB_{9}	—	May 7, 1999	Catalina	CSS	·	5.8 km	MPC · JPL
59502	1999 JR_{9}	—	May 8, 1999	Catalina	CSS	·	2.9 km	MPC · JPL
59503	1999 JU_{9}	—	May 8, 1999	Catalina	CSS	·	3.1 km	MPC · JPL
59504	1999 JY_{9}	—	May 8, 1999	Catalina	CSS	EOS	5.4 km	MPC · JPL
59505	1999 JW_{10}	—	May 9, 1999	Catalina	CSS	·	6.3 km	MPC · JPL
59506	1999 JD_{11}	—	May 9, 1999	Višnjan Observatory	K. Korlević	·	4.4 km	MPC · JPL
59507	1999 JW_{12}	—	May 14, 1999	Catalina	CSS	MAR	4.2 km	MPC · JPL
59508	1999 JP_{13}	—	May 10, 1999	Socorro	LINEAR	·	2.6 km	MPC · JPL
59509	1999 JR_{13}	—	May 10, 1999	Socorro	LINEAR	EUN	2.5 km	MPC · JPL
59510	1999 JY_{13}	—	May 10, 1999	Socorro	LINEAR	·	6.4 km	MPC · JPL
59511	1999 JP_{14}	—	May 10, 1999	Socorro	LINEAR	·	5.6 km	MPC · JPL
59512	1999 JW_{14}	—	May 10, 1999	Socorro	LINEAR	·	4.5 km	MPC · JPL
59513	1999 JX_{14}	—	May 10, 1999	Socorro	LINEAR	·	5.3 km	MPC · JPL
59514	1999 JY_{14}	—	May 12, 1999	Socorro	LINEAR	·	2.0 km	MPC · JPL
59515	1999 JP_{15}	—	May 15, 1999	Catalina	CSS	·	5.1 km	MPC · JPL
59516	1999 JX_{15}	—	May 10, 1999	Socorro	LINEAR	EUN	3.8 km	MPC · JPL
59517	1999 JA_{16}	—	May 15, 1999	Kitt Peak	Spacewatch	·	4.3 km	MPC · JPL
59518	1999 JX_{17}	—	May 10, 1999	Socorro	LINEAR	·	7.2 km	MPC · JPL
59519	1999 JK_{18}	—	May 10, 1999	Socorro	LINEAR	·	2.4 km	MPC · JPL
59520	1999 JY_{18}	—	May 10, 1999	Socorro	LINEAR	·	2.5 km	MPC · JPL
59521	1999 JS_{20}	—	May 10, 1999	Socorro	LINEAR	·	2.5 km	MPC · JPL
59522	1999 JR_{21}	—	May 10, 1999	Socorro	LINEAR	V	3.7 km	MPC · JPL
59523	1999 JM_{22}	—	May 10, 1999	Socorro	LINEAR	·	4.8 km	MPC · JPL
59524	1999 JU_{22}	—	May 10, 1999	Socorro	LINEAR	·	3.4 km	MPC · JPL
59525	1999 JE_{23}	—	May 10, 1999	Socorro	LINEAR	·	11 km	MPC · JPL
59526	1999 JS_{23}	—	May 10, 1999	Socorro	LINEAR	·	7.7 km	MPC · JPL
59527	1999 JE_{24}	—	May 10, 1999	Socorro	LINEAR	EUN	4.8 km	MPC · JPL
59528	1999 JK_{24}	—	May 10, 1999	Socorro	LINEAR	GEF	3.8 km	MPC · JPL
59529	1999 JT_{24}	—	May 10, 1999	Socorro	LINEAR	slow	5.5 km	MPC · JPL
59530	1999 JU_{24}	—	May 10, 1999	Socorro	LINEAR	·	8.2 km	MPC · JPL
59531	1999 JW_{25}	—	May 10, 1999	Socorro	LINEAR	RAF	3.3 km	MPC · JPL
59532	1999 JD_{26}	—	May 10, 1999	Socorro	LINEAR	·	3.7 km	MPC · JPL
59533	1999 JT_{26}	—	May 10, 1999	Socorro	LINEAR	·	2.9 km	MPC · JPL
59534	1999 JH_{27}	—	May 10, 1999	Socorro	LINEAR	·	3.3 km	MPC · JPL
59535	1999 JQ_{27}	—	May 10, 1999	Socorro	LINEAR	MAR	4.3 km	MPC · JPL
59536	1999 JP_{28}	—	May 10, 1999	Socorro	LINEAR	·	4.2 km	MPC · JPL
59537	1999 JQ_{29}	—	May 10, 1999	Socorro	LINEAR	·	2.1 km	MPC · JPL
59538	1999 JR_{29}	—	May 10, 1999	Socorro	LINEAR	·	3.4 km	MPC · JPL
59539	1999 JU_{30}	—	May 10, 1999	Socorro	LINEAR	·	2.7 km	MPC · JPL
59540	1999 JC_{31}	—	May 10, 1999	Socorro	LINEAR	·	2.5 km	MPC · JPL
59541	1999 JE_{31}	—	May 10, 1999	Socorro	LINEAR	·	4.0 km	MPC · JPL
59542	1999 JG_{31}	—	May 10, 1999	Socorro	LINEAR	·	7.4 km	MPC · JPL
59543	1999 JU_{31}	—	May 10, 1999	Socorro	LINEAR	·	3.0 km	MPC · JPL
59544	1999 JH_{32}	—	May 10, 1999	Socorro	LINEAR	KON	7.5 km	MPC · JPL
59545	1999 JZ_{32}	—	May 10, 1999	Socorro	LINEAR	·	3.4 km	MPC · JPL
59546	1999 JV_{34}	—	May 10, 1999	Socorro	LINEAR	·	4.5 km	MPC · JPL
59547	1999 JS_{35}	—	May 10, 1999	Socorro	LINEAR	RAF	2.7 km	MPC · JPL
59548	1999 JU_{35}	—	May 10, 1999	Socorro	LINEAR	MAR	2.6 km	MPC · JPL
59549	1999 JE_{36}	—	May 10, 1999	Socorro	LINEAR	·	4.6 km	MPC · JPL
59550	1999 JH_{37}	—	May 10, 1999	Socorro	LINEAR	·	3.9 km	MPC · JPL
59551	1999 JL_{37}	—	May 10, 1999	Socorro	LINEAR	EUN	4.2 km	MPC · JPL
59552	1999 JM_{38}	—	May 10, 1999	Socorro	LINEAR	·	3.6 km	MPC · JPL
59553	1999 JP_{40}	—	May 10, 1999	Socorro	LINEAR	·	2.9 km	MPC · JPL
59554	1999 JW_{40}	—	May 10, 1999	Socorro	LINEAR	EUN	2.5 km	MPC · JPL
59555	1999 JE_{41}	—	May 10, 1999	Socorro	LINEAR	·	3.1 km	MPC · JPL
59556	1999 JF_{41}	—	May 10, 1999	Socorro	LINEAR	·	3.3 km	MPC · JPL
59557	1999 JH_{41}	—	May 10, 1999	Socorro	LINEAR	·	3.6 km	MPC · JPL
59558	1999 JR_{41}	—	May 10, 1999	Socorro	LINEAR	·	4.4 km	MPC · JPL
59559	1999 JD_{42}	—	May 10, 1999	Socorro	LINEAR	·	2.2 km	MPC · JPL
59560	1999 JG_{42}	—	May 10, 1999	Socorro	LINEAR	·	4.7 km	MPC · JPL
59561	1999 JQ_{42}	—	May 10, 1999	Socorro	LINEAR	·	1.8 km	MPC · JPL
59562	1999 JK_{43}	—	May 10, 1999	Socorro	LINEAR	·	4.1 km	MPC · JPL
59563	1999 JO_{45}	—	May 10, 1999	Socorro	LINEAR	·	2.4 km	MPC · JPL
59564	1999 JR_{46}	—	May 10, 1999	Socorro	LINEAR	·	3.1 km	MPC · JPL
59565	1999 JT_{46}	—	May 10, 1999	Socorro	LINEAR	(5)	3.3 km	MPC · JPL
59566	1999 JU_{46}	—	May 10, 1999	Socorro	LINEAR	·	2.5 km	MPC · JPL
59567	1999 JU_{47}	—	May 10, 1999	Socorro	LINEAR	·	2.5 km	MPC · JPL
59568	1999 JW_{47}	—	May 10, 1999	Socorro	LINEAR	·	5.5 km	MPC · JPL
59569	1999 JJ_{48}	—	May 10, 1999	Socorro	LINEAR	V	2.9 km	MPC · JPL
59570	1999 JX_{48}	—	May 10, 1999	Socorro	LINEAR	·	4.2 km	MPC · JPL
59571	1999 JY_{48}	—	May 10, 1999	Socorro	LINEAR	·	4.7 km	MPC · JPL
59572	1999 JA_{49}	—	May 10, 1999	Socorro	LINEAR	slow	3.4 km	MPC · JPL
59573	1999 JK_{49}	—	May 10, 1999	Socorro	LINEAR	·	3.3 km	MPC · JPL
59574	1999 JE_{50}	—	May 10, 1999	Socorro	LINEAR	NEM	6.6 km	MPC · JPL
59575	1999 JB_{51}	—	May 10, 1999	Socorro	LINEAR	·	4.1 km	MPC · JPL
59576	1999 JM_{51}	—	May 10, 1999	Socorro	LINEAR	·	3.4 km	MPC · JPL
59577	1999 JS_{51}	—	May 10, 1999	Socorro	LINEAR	·	2.6 km	MPC · JPL
59578	1999 JA_{53}	—	May 10, 1999	Socorro	LINEAR	·	3.9 km	MPC · JPL
59579	1999 JO_{53}	—	May 10, 1999	Socorro	LINEAR	EUN	6.3 km	MPC · JPL
59580	1999 JC_{54}	—	May 10, 1999	Socorro	LINEAR	·	2.5 km	MPC · JPL
59581	1999 JD_{54}	—	May 10, 1999	Socorro	LINEAR	EUN	3.9 km	MPC · JPL
59582	1999 JE_{55}	—	May 10, 1999	Socorro	LINEAR	·	5.5 km	MPC · JPL
59583	1999 JM_{55}	—	May 10, 1999	Socorro	LINEAR	·	5.3 km	MPC · JPL
59584	1999 JT_{55}	—	May 10, 1999	Socorro	LINEAR	·	3.6 km	MPC · JPL
59585	1999 JV_{55}	—	May 10, 1999	Socorro	LINEAR	EUN	4.9 km	MPC · JPL
59586	1999 JB_{56}	—	May 10, 1999	Socorro	LINEAR	·	3.3 km	MPC · JPL
59587	1999 JJ_{56}	—	May 10, 1999	Socorro	LINEAR	·	5.9 km	MPC · JPL
59588	1999 JL_{56}	—	May 10, 1999	Socorro	LINEAR	·	4.7 km	MPC · JPL
59589	1999 JU_{56}	—	May 10, 1999	Socorro	LINEAR	·	4.6 km	MPC · JPL
59590	1999 JL_{57}	—	May 10, 1999	Socorro	LINEAR	·	3.8 km	MPC · JPL
59591	1999 JR_{58}	—	May 10, 1999	Socorro	LINEAR	·	5.5 km	MPC · JPL
59592	1999 JW_{58}	—	May 10, 1999	Socorro	LINEAR	EUN	3.5 km	MPC · JPL
59593	1999 JY_{58}	—	May 10, 1999	Socorro	LINEAR	·	3.6 km	MPC · JPL
59594	1999 JG_{59}	—	May 10, 1999	Socorro	LINEAR	GEF	3.1 km	MPC · JPL
59595	1999 JK_{60}	—	May 10, 1999	Socorro	LINEAR	·	3.9 km	MPC · JPL
59596	1999 JR_{60}	—	May 10, 1999	Socorro	LINEAR	·	6.0 km	MPC · JPL
59597	1999 JY_{60}	—	May 10, 1999	Socorro	LINEAR	·	2.4 km	MPC · JPL
59598	1999 JL_{61}	—	May 10, 1999	Socorro	LINEAR	·	2.5 km	MPC · JPL
59599	1999 JM_{62}	—	May 10, 1999	Socorro	LINEAR	MAR · slow	4.3 km	MPC · JPL
59600	1999 JX_{62}	—	May 10, 1999	Socorro	LINEAR	PAD · slow	5.1 km	MPC · JPL

== 59601–59700 ==
back to top

Designation			Discovery			Properties		Ref
Permanent	Provisional	Named after	Date	Site	Discoverer(s)	Category	Diam.	Ref
59601	1999 JL_{63}	—	May 10, 1999	Socorro	LINEAR	·	1.5 km	MPC · JPL
59602	1999 JW_{63}	—	May 10, 1999	Socorro	LINEAR	·	6.1 km	MPC · JPL
59603	1999 JX_{63}	—	May 10, 1999	Socorro	LINEAR	·	7.9 km	MPC · JPL
59604	1999 JQ_{64}	—	May 10, 1999	Socorro	LINEAR	EUN	2.6 km	MPC · JPL
59605	1999 JZ_{64}	—	May 10, 1999	Socorro	LINEAR	·	2.7 km	MPC · JPL
59606	1999 JK_{65}	—	May 12, 1999	Socorro	LINEAR	·	2.5 km	MPC · JPL
59607	1999 JV_{65}	—	May 12, 1999	Socorro	LINEAR	·	4.0 km	MPC · JPL
59608	1999 JQ_{66}	—	May 12, 1999	Socorro	LINEAR	·	3.7 km	MPC · JPL
59609	1999 JB_{67}	—	May 12, 1999	Socorro	LINEAR	·	2.7 km	MPC · JPL
59610	1999 JE_{67}	—	May 12, 1999	Socorro	LINEAR	·	3.0 km	MPC · JPL
59611	1999 JY_{67}	—	May 12, 1999	Socorro	LINEAR	EUN	2.7 km	MPC · JPL
59612	1999 JZ_{67}	—	May 12, 1999	Socorro	LINEAR	·	2.7 km	MPC · JPL
59613	1999 JS_{68}	—	May 12, 1999	Socorro	LINEAR	·	2.7 km	MPC · JPL
59614	1999 JR_{69}	—	May 12, 1999	Socorro	LINEAR	·	5.3 km	MPC · JPL
59615	1999 JT_{69}	—	May 12, 1999	Socorro	LINEAR	·	3.9 km	MPC · JPL
59616	1999 JY_{69}	—	May 12, 1999	Socorro	LINEAR	EUN	3.9 km	MPC · JPL
59617	1999 JM_{70}	—	May 12, 1999	Socorro	LINEAR	·	2.4 km	MPC · JPL
59618	1999 JR_{70}	—	May 12, 1999	Socorro	LINEAR	·	3.0 km	MPC · JPL
59619	1999 JG_{71}	—	May 12, 1999	Socorro	LINEAR	·	2.3 km	MPC · JPL
59620	1999 JY_{71}	—	May 12, 1999	Socorro	LINEAR	·	2.3 km	MPC · JPL
59621	1999 JN_{72}	—	May 12, 1999	Socorro	LINEAR	EUN	3.5 km	MPC · JPL
59622	1999 JX_{72}	—	May 12, 1999	Socorro	LINEAR	·	6.5 km	MPC · JPL
59623	1999 JE_{73}	—	May 12, 1999	Socorro	LINEAR	·	4.5 km	MPC · JPL
59624	1999 JS_{73}	—	May 12, 1999	Socorro	LINEAR	EUN	3.3 km	MPC · JPL
59625	1999 JU_{73}	—	May 12, 1999	Socorro	LINEAR	·	5.1 km	MPC · JPL
59626	1999 JA_{75}	—	May 12, 1999	Socorro	LINEAR	PHO	5.6 km	MPC · JPL
59627	1999 JH_{76}	—	May 10, 1999	Socorro	LINEAR	·	3.8 km	MPC · JPL
59628	1999 JP_{76}	—	May 10, 1999	Socorro	LINEAR	·	5.4 km	MPC · JPL
59629	1999 JV_{76}	—	May 10, 1999	Socorro	LINEAR	MAR	4.9 km	MPC · JPL
59630	1999 JK_{77}	—	May 12, 1999	Socorro	LINEAR	·	4.3 km	MPC · JPL
59631	1999 JY_{77}	—	May 12, 1999	Socorro	LINEAR	V	2.1 km	MPC · JPL
59632	1999 JZ_{77}	—	May 12, 1999	Socorro	LINEAR	·	7.0 km	MPC · JPL
59633	1999 JC_{78}	—	May 12, 1999	Socorro	LINEAR	EUN	5.7 km	MPC · JPL
59634	1999 JS_{79}	—	May 13, 1999	Socorro	LINEAR	·	3.5 km	MPC · JPL
59635	1999 JJ_{80}	—	May 12, 1999	Socorro	LINEAR	·	5.4 km	MPC · JPL
59636	1999 JJ_{81}	—	May 14, 1999	Socorro	LINEAR	·	2.7 km	MPC · JPL
59637	1999 JF_{82}	—	May 12, 1999	Socorro	LINEAR	·	9.1 km	MPC · JPL
59638	1999 JH_{82}	—	May 12, 1999	Socorro	LINEAR	EUN	4.4 km	MPC · JPL
59639	1999 JS_{83}	—	May 12, 1999	Socorro	LINEAR	·	3.2 km	MPC · JPL
59640	1999 JH_{84}	—	May 12, 1999	Socorro	LINEAR	MAR	3.0 km	MPC · JPL
59641	1999 JS_{85}	—	May 10, 1999	Socorro	LINEAR	·	2.2 km	MPC · JPL
59642	1999 JZ_{86}	—	May 12, 1999	Socorro	LINEAR	·	3.5 km	MPC · JPL
59643	1999 JA_{87}	—	May 12, 1999	Socorro	LINEAR	·	4.0 km	MPC · JPL
59644	1999 JS_{88}	—	May 12, 1999	Socorro	LINEAR	·	2.6 km	MPC · JPL
59645	1999 JH_{89}	—	May 12, 1999	Socorro	LINEAR	GEF	2.8 km	MPC · JPL
59646	1999 JX_{89}	—	May 12, 1999	Socorro	LINEAR	EUN	3.5 km	MPC · JPL
59647	1999 JY_{89}	—	May 12, 1999	Socorro	LINEAR	·	3.3 km	MPC · JPL
59648	1999 JA_{90}	—	May 12, 1999	Socorro	LINEAR	·	4.5 km	MPC · JPL
59649	1999 JB_{90}	—	May 12, 1999	Socorro	LINEAR	·	2.0 km	MPC · JPL
59650	1999 JZ_{90}	—	May 12, 1999	Socorro	LINEAR	·	4.4 km	MPC · JPL
59651	1999 JK_{91}	—	May 12, 1999	Socorro	LINEAR	·	13 km	MPC · JPL
59652	1999 JM_{92}	—	May 12, 1999	Socorro	LINEAR	·	4.5 km	MPC · JPL
59653	1999 JZ_{92}	—	May 12, 1999	Socorro	LINEAR	·	3.8 km	MPC · JPL
59654	1999 JB_{94}	—	May 12, 1999	Socorro	LINEAR	RAF	3.0 km	MPC · JPL
59655	1999 JN_{94}	—	May 12, 1999	Socorro	LINEAR	·	3.2 km	MPC · JPL
59656	1999 JT_{94}	—	May 12, 1999	Socorro	LINEAR	PHO	3.4 km	MPC · JPL
59657	1999 JC_{95}	—	May 12, 1999	Socorro	LINEAR	·	5.9 km	MPC · JPL
59658	1999 JE_{95}	—	May 12, 1999	Socorro	LINEAR	·	3.6 km	MPC · JPL
59659	1999 JM_{95}	—	May 12, 1999	Socorro	LINEAR	·	5.4 km	MPC · JPL
59660	1999 JE_{96}	—	May 12, 1999	Socorro	LINEAR	·	3.1 km	MPC · JPL
59661	1999 JG_{96}	—	May 12, 1999	Socorro	LINEAR	·	7.1 km	MPC · JPL
59662	1999 JN_{96}	—	May 12, 1999	Socorro	LINEAR	EUN · slow	3.7 km	MPC · JPL
59663	1999 JY_{96}	—	May 12, 1999	Socorro	LINEAR	·	9.1 km	MPC · JPL
59664	1999 JB_{97}	—	May 12, 1999	Socorro	LINEAR	·	4.1 km	MPC · JPL
59665	1999 JF_{97}	—	May 12, 1999	Socorro	LINEAR	EUN	4.0 km	MPC · JPL
59666	1999 JH_{97}	—	May 12, 1999	Socorro	LINEAR	·	3.8 km	MPC · JPL
59667	1999 JQ_{97}	—	May 12, 1999	Socorro	LINEAR	EUN	3.6 km	MPC · JPL
59668	1999 JG_{98}	—	May 12, 1999	Socorro	LINEAR	EOS	5.3 km	MPC · JPL
59669	1999 JM_{99}	—	May 12, 1999	Socorro	LINEAR	ADE	6.2 km	MPC · JPL
59670	1999 JP_{99}	—	May 12, 1999	Socorro	LINEAR	·	3.7 km	MPC · JPL
59671	1999 JW_{99}	—	May 12, 1999	Socorro	LINEAR	·	3.8 km	MPC · JPL
59672	1999 JG_{100}	—	May 12, 1999	Socorro	LINEAR	EUN	3.1 km	MPC · JPL
59673	1999 JR_{100}	—	May 12, 1999	Socorro	LINEAR	·	3.8 km	MPC · JPL
59674	1999 JY_{100}	—	May 12, 1999	Socorro	LINEAR	MAR	3.2 km	MPC · JPL
59675	1999 JC_{101}	—	May 12, 1999	Socorro	LINEAR	EUN	2.5 km	MPC · JPL
59676	1999 JE_{101}	—	May 12, 1999	Socorro	LINEAR	·	11 km	MPC · JPL
59677	1999 JH_{101}	—	May 12, 1999	Socorro	LINEAR	·	4.3 km	MPC · JPL
59678	1999 JM_{101}	—	May 13, 1999	Socorro	LINEAR	·	5.2 km	MPC · JPL
59679	1999 JM_{102}	—	May 13, 1999	Socorro	LINEAR	·	3.8 km	MPC · JPL
59680	1999 JW_{102}	—	May 13, 1999	Socorro	LINEAR	·	8.2 km	MPC · JPL
59681	1999 JC_{103}	—	May 13, 1999	Socorro	LINEAR	·	4.6 km	MPC · JPL
59682	1999 JF_{103}	—	May 13, 1999	Socorro	LINEAR	PAD	4.9 km	MPC · JPL
59683	1999 JQ_{104}	—	May 15, 1999	Socorro	LINEAR	EUN	4.8 km	MPC · JPL
59684	1999 JB_{107}	—	May 13, 1999	Socorro	LINEAR	·	4.6 km	MPC · JPL
59685	1999 JR_{108}	—	May 13, 1999	Socorro	LINEAR	(5)	4.2 km	MPC · JPL
59686	1999 JS_{108}	—	May 13, 1999	Socorro	LINEAR	V	1.7 km	MPC · JPL
59687	1999 JU_{108}	—	May 13, 1999	Socorro	LINEAR	·	2.3 km	MPC · JPL
59688	1999 JO_{110}	—	May 13, 1999	Socorro	LINEAR	·	4.6 km	MPC · JPL
59689	1999 JS_{111}	—	May 13, 1999	Socorro	LINEAR	·	3.3 km	MPC · JPL
59690	1999 JD_{112}	—	May 13, 1999	Socorro	LINEAR	·	3.8 km	MPC · JPL
59691	1999 JM_{113}	—	May 13, 1999	Socorro	LINEAR	·	4.5 km	MPC · JPL
59692	1999 JC_{114}	—	May 13, 1999	Socorro	LINEAR	NYS	3.3 km	MPC · JPL
59693	1999 JA_{116}	—	May 13, 1999	Socorro	LINEAR	EUN	2.4 km	MPC · JPL
59694	1999 JF_{116}	—	May 13, 1999	Socorro	LINEAR	·	2.1 km	MPC · JPL
59695	1999 JU_{116}	—	May 13, 1999	Socorro	LINEAR	·	1.8 km	MPC · JPL
59696	1999 JW_{116}	—	May 13, 1999	Socorro	LINEAR	·	4.6 km	MPC · JPL
59697	1999 JS_{117}	—	May 13, 1999	Socorro	LINEAR	·	3.4 km	MPC · JPL
59698	1999 JJ_{118}	—	May 13, 1999	Socorro	LINEAR	·	2.5 km	MPC · JPL
59699	1999 JU_{118}	—	May 13, 1999	Socorro	LINEAR	·	2.4 km	MPC · JPL
59700	1999 JX_{118}	—	May 13, 1999	Socorro	LINEAR	·	5.7 km	MPC · JPL

== 59701–59800 ==
back to top

Designation			Discovery			Properties		Ref
Permanent	Provisional	Named after	Date	Site	Discoverer(s)	Category	Diam.	Ref
59701	1999 JP_{119}	—	May 13, 1999	Socorro	LINEAR	·	5.1 km	MPC · JPL
59702	1999 JZ_{119}	—	May 13, 1999	Socorro	LINEAR	MAR	2.1 km	MPC · JPL
59703	1999 JB_{120}	—	May 13, 1999	Socorro	LINEAR	·	2.6 km	MPC · JPL
59704	1999 JJ_{120}	—	May 13, 1999	Socorro	LINEAR	·	3.9 km	MPC · JPL
59705	1999 JM_{120}	—	May 13, 1999	Socorro	LINEAR	·	3.7 km	MPC · JPL
59706	1999 JT_{120}	—	May 13, 1999	Socorro	LINEAR	RAF · slow	3.1 km	MPC · JPL
59707	1999 JX_{121}	—	May 13, 1999	Socorro	LINEAR	·	6.2 km	MPC · JPL
59708	1999 JC_{123}	—	May 13, 1999	Socorro	LINEAR	V	1.9 km	MPC · JPL
59709	1999 JL_{123}	—	May 13, 1999	Socorro	LINEAR	·	6.6 km	MPC · JPL
59710	1999 JV_{123}	—	May 14, 1999	Socorro	LINEAR	·	2.6 km	MPC · JPL
59711	1999 JC_{126}	—	May 13, 1999	Socorro	LINEAR	EUN	2.2 km	MPC · JPL
59712	1999 JN_{126}	—	May 13, 1999	Socorro	LINEAR	·	2.1 km	MPC · JPL
59713	1999 JA_{127}	—	May 13, 1999	Socorro	LINEAR	·	4.0 km	MPC · JPL
59714	1999 JG_{128}	—	May 10, 1999	Socorro	LINEAR	·	3.6 km	MPC · JPL
59715	1999 JM_{129}	—	May 12, 1999	Socorro	LINEAR	·	3.2 km	MPC · JPL
59716	1999 JP_{131}	—	May 13, 1999	Socorro	LINEAR	·	3.9 km	MPC · JPL
59717	1999 JR_{137}	—	May 10, 1999	Puckett	Puckett	GEF	2.2 km	MPC · JPL
59718	1999 KG_{1}	—	May 18, 1999	Socorro	LINEAR	·	7.3 km	MPC · JPL
59719	1999 KN_{3}	—	May 17, 1999	Kitt Peak	Spacewatch	·	3.0 km	MPC · JPL
59720	1999 KH_{5}	—	May 20, 1999	Kitt Peak	Spacewatch	·	2.1 km	MPC · JPL
59721	1999 KM_{5}	—	May 21, 1999	Kitt Peak	Spacewatch	·	4.2 km	MPC · JPL
59722	1999 KR_{6}	—	May 17, 1999	Socorro	LINEAR	·	4.0 km	MPC · JPL
59723	1999 KO_{8}	—	May 18, 1999	Socorro	LINEAR	(194)	4.1 km	MPC · JPL
59724	1999 KV_{13}	—	May 18, 1999	Socorro	LINEAR	·	5.9 km	MPC · JPL
59725	1999 KX_{13}	—	May 18, 1999	Socorro	LINEAR	·	3.7 km	MPC · JPL
59726	1999 KA_{14}	—	May 18, 1999	Socorro	LINEAR	·	4.5 km	MPC · JPL
59727	1999 KC_{15}	—	May 18, 1999	Socorro	LINEAR	·	4.0 km	MPC · JPL
59728	1999 KW_{15}	—	May 18, 1999	Socorro	LINEAR	EUN	2.9 km	MPC · JPL
59729	1999 LN	—	June 6, 1999	Višnjan Observatory	K. Korlević	·	6.3 km	MPC · JPL
59730	1999 LW	—	June 7, 1999	Prescott	P. G. Comba	·	3.1 km	MPC · JPL
59731	1999 LL_{2}	—	June 8, 1999	Socorro	LINEAR	ADE	4.2 km	MPC · JPL
59732	1999 LO_{2}	—	June 8, 1999	Socorro	LINEAR	·	4.3 km	MPC · JPL
59733	1999 LR_{2}	—	June 8, 1999	Socorro	LINEAR	·	3.2 km	MPC · JPL
59734	1999 LT_{2}	—	June 9, 1999	Socorro	LINEAR	ERI	4.1 km	MPC · JPL
59735	1999 LY_{3}	—	June 9, 1999	Socorro	LINEAR	·	6.1 km	MPC · JPL
59736	1999 LA_{5}	—	June 8, 1999	Socorro	LINEAR	·	5.1 km	MPC · JPL
59737	1999 LC_{6}	—	June 11, 1999	Socorro	LINEAR	BAR	4.8 km	MPC · JPL
59738	1999 LH_{8}	—	June 8, 1999	Socorro	LINEAR	·	4.0 km	MPC · JPL
59739	1999 LP_{8}	—	June 8, 1999	Socorro	LINEAR	MAR	2.9 km	MPC · JPL
59740	1999 LC_{9}	—	June 8, 1999	Socorro	LINEAR	·	5.2 km	MPC · JPL
59741	1999 LE_{9}	—	June 8, 1999	Socorro	LINEAR	EUN	2.9 km	MPC · JPL
59742	1999 LN_{9}	—	June 8, 1999	Socorro	LINEAR	GEF	3.4 km	MPC · JPL
59743	1999 LV_{9}	—	June 8, 1999	Socorro	LINEAR	ADE	5.5 km	MPC · JPL
59744	1999 LG_{10}	—	June 8, 1999	Socorro	LINEAR	PHO	4.5 km	MPC · JPL
59745	1999 LF_{13}	—	June 9, 1999	Socorro	LINEAR	EUN	3.7 km	MPC · JPL
59746	1999 LN_{13}	—	June 9, 1999	Socorro	LINEAR	·	3.9 km	MPC · JPL
59747	1999 LV_{13}	—	June 9, 1999	Socorro	LINEAR	·	3.6 km	MPC · JPL
59748	1999 LE_{14}	—	June 9, 1999	Socorro	LINEAR	MAR	5.6 km	MPC · JPL
59749	1999 LZ_{15}	—	June 12, 1999	Socorro	LINEAR	H	1.3 km	MPC · JPL
59750	1999 LX_{16}	—	June 9, 1999	Socorro	LINEAR	(5)	3.0 km	MPC · JPL
59751	1999 LU_{18}	—	June 9, 1999	Socorro	LINEAR	·	3.6 km	MPC · JPL
59752	1999 LW_{19}	—	June 9, 1999	Socorro	LINEAR	·	5.2 km	MPC · JPL
59753	1999 LA_{28}	—	June 10, 1999	Socorro	LINEAR	·	1.7 km	MPC · JPL
59754	1999 LR_{31}	—	June 11, 1999	Kitt Peak	Spacewatch	·	1.8 km	MPC · JPL
59755	1999 LY_{32}	—	June 8, 1999	Socorro	LINEAR	EUN	4.1 km	MPC · JPL
59756	1999 LL_{35}	—	June 7, 1999	Catalina	CSS	HNS	3.7 km	MPC · JPL
59757	1999 ME	—	June 18, 1999	Reedy Creek	J. Broughton	·	4.8 km	MPC · JPL
59758	1999 MH	—	June 18, 1999	Woomera	F. B. Zoltowski	·	2.2 km	MPC · JPL
59759	1999 MR	—	June 20, 1999	Reedy Creek	J. Broughton	·	4.5 km	MPC · JPL
59760	1999 MU	—	June 22, 1999	Catalina	CSS	EUN	2.9 km	MPC · JPL
59761	1999 MZ	—	June 23, 1999	Woomera	F. B. Zoltowski	·	3.2 km	MPC · JPL
59762	1999 NB_{1}	—	July 11, 1999	Višnjan Observatory	K. Korlević	·	1.8 km	MPC · JPL
59763	1999 NF_{2}	—	July 12, 1999	Socorro	LINEAR	URS	9.8 km	MPC · JPL
59764	1999 NK_{3}	—	July 13, 1999	Socorro	LINEAR	·	5.2 km	MPC · JPL
59765	1999 NN_{4}	—	July 13, 1999	Reedy Creek	J. Broughton	slow	6.9 km	MPC · JPL
59766	1999 NW_{6}	—	July 13, 1999	Socorro	LINEAR	·	4.9 km	MPC · JPL
59767	1999 NR_{10}	—	July 13, 1999	Socorro	LINEAR	EOS	9.0 km	MPC · JPL
59768	1999 NV_{10}	—	July 13, 1999	Socorro	LINEAR	EOS	5.6 km	MPC · JPL
59769	1999 NG_{15}	—	July 14, 1999	Socorro	LINEAR	NYS ·	3.8 km	MPC · JPL
59770	1999 NS_{15}	—	July 14, 1999	Socorro	LINEAR	GEF	3.5 km	MPC · JPL
59771	1999 NX_{17}	—	July 14, 1999	Socorro	LINEAR	·	6.1 km	MPC · JPL
59772	1999 NN_{18}	—	July 14, 1999	Socorro	LINEAR	·	4.9 km	MPC · JPL
59773	1999 NZ_{21}	—	July 14, 1999	Socorro	LINEAR	·	5.9 km	MPC · JPL
59774	1999 NH_{29}	—	July 14, 1999	Socorro	LINEAR	MAS	1.5 km	MPC · JPL
59775	1999 NL_{29}	—	July 14, 1999	Socorro	LINEAR	DOR	5.9 km	MPC · JPL
59776	1999 NE_{33}	—	July 14, 1999	Socorro	LINEAR	ADE	6.2 km	MPC · JPL
59777	1999 NK_{35}	—	July 14, 1999	Socorro	LINEAR	·	2.0 km	MPC · JPL
59778	1999 NO_{39}	—	July 14, 1999	Socorro	LINEAR	·	3.7 km	MPC · JPL
59779	1999 NU_{40}	—	July 14, 1999	Socorro	LINEAR	HYG	8.9 km	MPC · JPL
59780	1999 NB_{42}	—	July 14, 1999	Socorro	LINEAR	EOS	5.7 km	MPC · JPL
59781	1999 NU_{42}	—	July 14, 1999	Socorro	LINEAR	URS	8.9 km	MPC · JPL
59782	1999 NG_{43}	—	July 13, 1999	Socorro	LINEAR	EUN	3.3 km	MPC · JPL
59783	1999 NN_{43}	—	July 13, 1999	Socorro	LINEAR	·	2.8 km	MPC · JPL
59784	1999 NV_{44}	—	July 13, 1999	Socorro	LINEAR	EUN	3.1 km	MPC · JPL
59785	1999 NG_{49}	—	July 13, 1999	Socorro	LINEAR	·	2.3 km	MPC · JPL
59786	1999 NY_{52}	—	July 12, 1999	Socorro	LINEAR	BRA	3.2 km	MPC · JPL
59787	1999 NO_{55}	—	July 12, 1999	Socorro	LINEAR	(18466)	4.5 km	MPC · JPL
59788	1999 ND_{56}	—	July 12, 1999	Socorro	LINEAR	AEG	9.9 km	MPC · JPL
59789	1999 NO_{56}	—	July 12, 1999	Socorro	LINEAR	·	4.5 km	MPC · JPL
59790	1999 NR_{56}	—	July 12, 1999	Socorro	LINEAR	·	9.5 km	MPC · JPL
59791	1999 NN_{59}	—	July 13, 1999	Socorro	LINEAR	CLO	5.3 km	MPC · JPL
59792	1999 NL_{60}	—	July 13, 1999	Socorro	LINEAR	·	6.1 km	MPC · JPL
59793 Clapiès	1999 OD	Clapiès	July 16, 1999	Pises	Pises	·	5.3 km	MPC · JPL
59794	1999 OE_{1}	—	July 18, 1999	Reedy Creek	J. Broughton	·	3.6 km	MPC · JPL
59795	1999 OE_{2}	—	July 22, 1999	Socorro	LINEAR	URS	12 km	MPC · JPL
59796	1999 OJ_{3}	—	July 22, 1999	Socorro	LINEAR	·	6.0 km	MPC · JPL
59797 Píšala	1999 PX	Píšala	August 7, 1999	Kleť	J. Tichá, M. Tichý	·	2.3 km	MPC · JPL
59798	1999 PO_{1}	—	August 3, 1999	Siding Spring	R. H. McNaught	·	8.3 km	MPC · JPL
59799	1999 PC_{2}	—	August 10, 1999	Reedy Creek	J. Broughton	·	2.0 km	MPC · JPL
59800 Astropis	1999 PV_{4}	Astropis	August 14, 1999	Ondřejov	P. Pravec, P. Kušnirák	HNS	3.9 km	MPC · JPL

== 59801–59900 ==
back to top

Designation			Discovery			Properties		Ref
Permanent	Provisional	Named after	Date	Site	Discoverer(s)	Category	Diam.	Ref
59801	1999 PY_{4}	—	August 8, 1999	Gekko	T. Kagawa	·	3.8 km	MPC · JPL
59802	1999 PZ_{5}	—	August 13, 1999	Kitt Peak	Spacewatch	VER	5.4 km	MPC · JPL
59803	1999 QH_{2}	—	August 22, 1999	Farpoint	G. Bell	·	5.0 km	MPC · JPL
59804 Dickjoyce	1999 RJ_{1}	Dickjoyce	September 5, 1999	Fountain Hills	C. W. Juels	·	14 km	MPC · JPL
59805	1999 RZ_{6}	—	September 3, 1999	Kitt Peak	Spacewatch	·	4.8 km	MPC · JPL
59806	1999 RQ_{10}	—	September 7, 1999	Socorro	LINEAR	·	4.9 km	MPC · JPL
59807	1999 RH_{13}	—	September 7, 1999	Socorro	LINEAR	KOR	3.3 km	MPC · JPL
59808	1999 RU_{13}	—	September 7, 1999	Socorro	LINEAR	·	6.6 km	MPC · JPL
59809	1999 RW_{16}	—	September 7, 1999	Socorro	LINEAR	·	5.3 km	MPC · JPL
59810	1999 RM_{17}	—	September 7, 1999	Socorro	LINEAR	HYG	6.1 km	MPC · JPL
59811	1999 RV_{17}	—	September 7, 1999	Socorro	LINEAR	·	4.3 km	MPC · JPL
59812	1999 RA_{18}	—	September 7, 1999	Socorro	LINEAR	·	12 km	MPC · JPL
59813	1999 RU_{18}	—	September 7, 1999	Socorro	LINEAR	·	1.6 km	MPC · JPL
59814	1999 RX_{18}	—	September 7, 1999	Socorro	LINEAR	NYS	1.9 km	MPC · JPL
59815	1999 RQ_{19}	—	September 7, 1999	Socorro	LINEAR	·	9.8 km	MPC · JPL
59816	1999 RO_{20}	—	September 7, 1999	Socorro	LINEAR	·	2.5 km	MPC · JPL
59817	1999 RC_{21}	—	September 7, 1999	Socorro	LINEAR	·	5.4 km	MPC · JPL
59818	1999 RF_{21}	—	September 7, 1999	Socorro	LINEAR	·	4.3 km	MPC · JPL
59819	1999 RH_{22}	—	September 7, 1999	Socorro	LINEAR	·	5.6 km	MPC · JPL
59820	1999 RT_{23}	—	September 7, 1999	Socorro	LINEAR	·	5.1 km	MPC · JPL
59821	1999 RR_{25}	—	September 7, 1999	Socorro	LINEAR	·	2.0 km	MPC · JPL
59822	1999 RK_{26}	—	September 7, 1999	Socorro	LINEAR	·	10 km	MPC · JPL
59823	1999 RU_{26}	—	September 7, 1999	Socorro	LINEAR	·	3.8 km	MPC · JPL
59824	1999 RQ_{27}	—	September 7, 1999	Višnjan Observatory	K. Korlević	·	8.5 km	MPC · JPL
59825	1999 RV_{27}	—	September 8, 1999	Višnjan Observatory	K. Korlević	·	9.9 km	MPC · JPL
59826	1999 RU_{29}	—	September 8, 1999	Socorro	LINEAR	H	1.2 km	MPC · JPL
59827	1999 RF_{32}	—	September 9, 1999	Višnjan Observatory	K. Korlević	EUN	3.2 km	MPC · JPL
59828 Ossikar	1999 RU_{32}	Ossikar	September 5, 1999	Drebach	G. Lehmann	AGN	2.7 km	MPC · JPL
59829	1999 RZ_{32}	—	September 7, 1999	Farpoint	G. Bell, G. Hug	·	7.0 km	MPC · JPL
59830 Reynek	1999 RE_{33}	Reynek	September 10, 1999	Kleť	J. Tichá, M. Tichý	·	4.8 km	MPC · JPL
59831	1999 RR_{36}	—	September 11, 1999	Višnjan Observatory	K. Korlević	KOR	4.3 km	MPC · JPL
59832	1999 RW_{36}	—	September 13, 1999	Prescott	P. G. Comba	·	1.3 km	MPC · JPL
59833 Danimatter	1999 RZ_{36}	Danimatter	September 3, 1999	Village-Neuf	C. Demeautis	EOS	6.2 km	MPC · JPL
59834	1999 RE_{37}	—	September 9, 1999	Uto	F. Uto	·	1.6 km	MPC · JPL
59835	1999 RJ_{40}	—	September 13, 1999	Ondřejov	P. Pravec, P. Kušnirák	EOS	5.1 km	MPC · JPL
59836	1999 RN_{44}	—	September 8, 1999	Socorro	LINEAR	·	2.5 km	MPC · JPL
59837	1999 RP_{44}	—	September 3, 1999	Teide	Casas, R., Zurita, C.	EOS	5.0 km	MPC · JPL
59838	1999 RU_{45}	—	September 9, 1999	Uccle	T. Pauwels	slow	3.7 km	MPC · JPL
59839	1999 RS_{47}	—	September 7, 1999	Socorro	LINEAR	·	2.9 km	MPC · JPL
59840	1999 RD_{49}	—	September 7, 1999	Socorro	LINEAR	EOS	9.0 km	MPC · JPL
59841	1999 RH_{54}	—	September 7, 1999	Socorro	LINEAR	NYS	2.8 km	MPC · JPL
59842	1999 RT_{55}	—	September 7, 1999	Socorro	LINEAR	(5)	3.2 km	MPC · JPL
59843	1999 RD_{59}	—	September 7, 1999	Socorro	LINEAR	·	6.6 km	MPC · JPL
59844	1999 RU_{60}	—	September 7, 1999	Socorro	LINEAR	EOS	4.1 km	MPC · JPL
59845	1999 RC_{61}	—	September 7, 1999	Socorro	LINEAR	EOS	5.0 km	MPC · JPL
59846	1999 RA_{64}	—	September 7, 1999	Socorro	LINEAR	KOR	3.3 km	MPC · JPL
59847	1999 RT_{71}	—	September 7, 1999	Socorro	LINEAR	·	6.7 km	MPC · JPL
59848	1999 RT_{73}	—	September 7, 1999	Socorro	LINEAR	·	3.7 km	MPC · JPL
59849	1999 RE_{78}	—	September 7, 1999	Socorro	LINEAR	·	3.0 km	MPC · JPL
59850	1999 RJ_{80}	—	September 7, 1999	Socorro	LINEAR	·	1.4 km	MPC · JPL
59851	1999 RO_{80}	—	September 7, 1999	Socorro	LINEAR	·	7.3 km	MPC · JPL
59852	1999 RN_{82}	—	September 7, 1999	Socorro	LINEAR	EOS	5.4 km	MPC · JPL
59853	1999 RP_{82}	—	September 7, 1999	Socorro	LINEAR	·	3.2 km	MPC · JPL
59854	1999 RY_{85}	—	September 7, 1999	Socorro	LINEAR	HYG	8.4 km	MPC · JPL
59855	1999 RD_{86}	—	September 7, 1999	Socorro	LINEAR	·	6.1 km	MPC · JPL
59856	1999 RJ_{92}	—	September 7, 1999	Socorro	LINEAR	·	1.6 km	MPC · JPL
59857	1999 RF_{93}	—	September 7, 1999	Socorro	LINEAR	·	8.6 km	MPC · JPL
59858	1999 RT_{93}	—	September 7, 1999	Socorro	LINEAR	·	4.5 km	MPC · JPL
59859	1999 RM_{94}	—	September 7, 1999	Socorro	LINEAR	·	3.4 km	MPC · JPL
59860	1999 RP_{94}	—	September 7, 1999	Socorro	LINEAR	THM	6.4 km	MPC · JPL
59861	1999 RY_{95}	—	September 7, 1999	Socorro	LINEAR	·	7.4 km	MPC · JPL
59862	1999 RT_{97}	—	September 7, 1999	Socorro	LINEAR	THM	5.9 km	MPC · JPL
59863	1999 RH_{98}	—	September 7, 1999	Socorro	LINEAR	THM	7.3 km	MPC · JPL
59864	1999 RW_{102}	—	September 8, 1999	Socorro	LINEAR	·	9.4 km	MPC · JPL
59865	1999 RO_{103}	—	September 8, 1999	Socorro	LINEAR	EOS	4.6 km	MPC · JPL
59866	1999 RF_{105}	—	September 8, 1999	Socorro	LINEAR	EOS	5.8 km	MPC · JPL
59867	1999 RT_{105}	—	September 8, 1999	Socorro	LINEAR	·	11 km	MPC · JPL
59868	1999 RH_{106}	—	September 8, 1999	Socorro	LINEAR	·	2.9 km	MPC · JPL
59869	1999 RC_{108}	—	September 8, 1999	Socorro	LINEAR	EOS	5.4 km	MPC · JPL
59870	1999 RH_{109}	—	September 8, 1999	Socorro	LINEAR	EOS	5.3 km	MPC · JPL
59871	1999 RL_{111}	—	September 9, 1999	Socorro	LINEAR	EOS	5.5 km	MPC · JPL
59872	1999 RB_{112}	—	September 9, 1999	Socorro	LINEAR	·	4.4 km	MPC · JPL
59873	1999 RO_{112}	—	September 9, 1999	Socorro	LINEAR	·	2.1 km	MPC · JPL
59874	1999 RJ_{113}	—	September 9, 1999	Socorro	LINEAR	·	5.9 km	MPC · JPL
59875	1999 RN_{114}	—	September 9, 1999	Socorro	LINEAR	THM	5.8 km	MPC · JPL
59876	1999 RK_{116}	—	September 9, 1999	Socorro	LINEAR	·	4.5 km	MPC · JPL
59877	1999 RA_{117}	—	September 9, 1999	Socorro	LINEAR	EUN	3.7 km	MPC · JPL
59878	1999 RF_{117}	—	September 9, 1999	Socorro	LINEAR	·	2.0 km	MPC · JPL
59879	1999 RM_{119}	—	September 9, 1999	Socorro	LINEAR	EOS · fast?	6.4 km	MPC · JPL
59880	1999 RS_{119}	—	September 9, 1999	Socorro	LINEAR	·	6.1 km	MPC · JPL
59881	1999 RZ_{121}	—	September 9, 1999	Socorro	LINEAR	fast	7.4 km	MPC · JPL
59882	1999 RM_{122}	—	September 9, 1999	Socorro	LINEAR	·	7.3 km	MPC · JPL
59883	1999 RU_{123}	—	September 9, 1999	Socorro	LINEAR	DOR	7.2 km	MPC · JPL
59884	1999 RW_{123}	—	September 9, 1999	Socorro	LINEAR	AST	6.7 km	MPC · JPL
59885	1999 RO_{124}	—	September 9, 1999	Socorro	LINEAR	·	4.0 km	MPC · JPL
59886	1999 RY_{126}	—	September 9, 1999	Socorro	LINEAR	·	2.5 km	MPC · JPL
59887	1999 RU_{127}	—	September 9, 1999	Socorro	LINEAR	·	7.2 km	MPC · JPL
59888	1999 RS_{128}	—	September 9, 1999	Socorro	LINEAR	CYB	13 km	MPC · JPL
59889	1999 RV_{129}	—	September 9, 1999	Socorro	LINEAR	EOS	6.0 km	MPC · JPL
59890	1999 RG_{133}	—	September 9, 1999	Socorro	LINEAR	·	8.7 km	MPC · JPL
59891	1999 RF_{135}	—	September 9, 1999	Socorro	LINEAR	·	8.8 km	MPC · JPL
59892	1999 RQ_{137}	—	September 9, 1999	Socorro	LINEAR	·	4.7 km	MPC · JPL
59893	1999 RY_{137}	—	September 9, 1999	Socorro	LINEAR	·	2.4 km	MPC · JPL
59894	1999 RQ_{138}	—	September 9, 1999	Socorro	LINEAR	·	7.7 km	MPC · JPL
59895	1999 RH_{140}	—	September 9, 1999	Socorro	LINEAR	HYG	6.4 km	MPC · JPL
59896	1999 RO_{140}	—	September 9, 1999	Socorro	LINEAR	THM	5.6 km	MPC · JPL
59897	1999 RD_{142}	—	September 9, 1999	Socorro	LINEAR	·	3.7 km	MPC · JPL
59898	1999 RE_{142}	—	September 9, 1999	Socorro	LINEAR	·	1.3 km	MPC · JPL
59899	1999 RN_{142}	—	September 9, 1999	Socorro	LINEAR	·	5.3 km	MPC · JPL
59900	1999 RH_{143}	—	September 9, 1999	Socorro	LINEAR	·	9.3 km	MPC · JPL

== 59901–60000 ==
back to top

Designation			Discovery			Properties		Ref
Permanent	Provisional	Named after	Date	Site	Discoverer(s)	Category	Diam.	Ref
59901	1999 RA_{145}	—	September 9, 1999	Socorro	LINEAR	·	3.3 km	MPC · JPL
59902	1999 RJ_{147}	—	September 9, 1999	Socorro	LINEAR	slow	10 km	MPC · JPL
59903	1999 RO_{148}	—	September 9, 1999	Socorro	LINEAR	CYB	13 km	MPC · JPL
59904	1999 RR_{149}	—	September 9, 1999	Socorro	LINEAR	·	8.8 km	MPC · JPL
59905	1999 RB_{151}	—	September 9, 1999	Socorro	LINEAR	HYG	10 km	MPC · JPL
59906	1999 RR_{151}	—	September 9, 1999	Socorro	LINEAR	NYS	1.4 km	MPC · JPL
59907	1999 RM_{152}	—	September 9, 1999	Socorro	LINEAR	·	4.5 km	MPC · JPL
59908	1999 RS_{154}	—	September 9, 1999	Socorro	LINEAR	·	11 km	MPC · JPL
59909	1999 RK_{155}	—	September 9, 1999	Socorro	LINEAR	EOS	8.9 km	MPC · JPL
59910	1999 RA_{156}	—	September 9, 1999	Socorro	LINEAR	·	2.4 km	MPC · JPL
59911	1999 RD_{156}	—	September 9, 1999	Socorro	LINEAR	HYG	6.5 km	MPC · JPL
59912	1999 RU_{156}	—	September 9, 1999	Socorro	LINEAR	·	6.6 km	MPC · JPL
59913	1999 RB_{157}	—	September 9, 1999	Socorro	LINEAR	EOS	3.8 km	MPC · JPL
59914	1999 RX_{157}	—	September 9, 1999	Socorro	LINEAR	·	7.7 km	MPC · JPL
59915	1999 RF_{159}	—	September 9, 1999	Socorro	LINEAR	·	18 km	MPC · JPL
59916	1999 RT_{159}	—	September 9, 1999	Socorro	LINEAR	(1298)	3.9 km	MPC · JPL
59917	1999 RC_{161}	—	September 9, 1999	Socorro	LINEAR	·	6.1 km	MPC · JPL
59918	1999 RF_{161}	—	September 9, 1999	Socorro	LINEAR	·	2.7 km	MPC · JPL
59919	1999 RP_{161}	—	September 9, 1999	Socorro	LINEAR	THM	7.4 km	MPC · JPL
59920	1999 RO_{162}	—	September 9, 1999	Socorro	LINEAR	GEF	5.1 km	MPC · JPL
59921	1999 RM_{163}	—	September 9, 1999	Socorro	LINEAR	·	4.1 km	MPC · JPL
59922	1999 RY_{164}	—	September 9, 1999	Socorro	LINEAR	·	5.1 km	MPC · JPL
59923	1999 RY_{165}	—	September 9, 1999	Socorro	LINEAR	(13314)	5.6 km	MPC · JPL
59924	1999 RN_{167}	—	September 9, 1999	Socorro	LINEAR	EOS	6.9 km	MPC · JPL
59925	1999 RR_{172}	—	September 9, 1999	Socorro	LINEAR	EOS	4.4 km	MPC · JPL
59926	1999 RD_{173}	—	September 9, 1999	Socorro	LINEAR	URS	8.2 km	MPC · JPL
59927	1999 RP_{173}	—	September 9, 1999	Socorro	LINEAR	·	10 km	MPC · JPL
59928	1999 RG_{174}	—	September 9, 1999	Socorro	LINEAR	·	5.2 km	MPC · JPL
59929	1999 RK_{174}	—	September 9, 1999	Socorro	LINEAR	·	4.5 km	MPC · JPL
59930	1999 RE_{176}	—	September 9, 1999	Socorro	LINEAR	·	5.7 km	MPC · JPL
59931	1999 RZ_{179}	—	September 9, 1999	Socorro	LINEAR	EOS	6.7 km	MPC · JPL
59932	1999 RY_{181}	—	September 9, 1999	Socorro	LINEAR	·	1.8 km	MPC · JPL
59933	1999 RQ_{186}	—	September 9, 1999	Socorro	LINEAR	·	3.8 km	MPC · JPL
59934	1999 RU_{186}	—	September 9, 1999	Socorro	LINEAR	·	3.4 km	MPC · JPL
59935	1999 RR_{187}	—	September 9, 1999	Socorro	LINEAR	KOR	3.6 km	MPC · JPL
59936	1999 RJ_{188}	—	September 9, 1999	Socorro	LINEAR	·	4.0 km	MPC · JPL
59937	1999 RH_{189}	—	September 9, 1999	Socorro	LINEAR	EOS	4.0 km	MPC · JPL
59938	1999 RQ_{190}	—	September 10, 1999	Socorro	LINEAR	EOS	4.3 km	MPC · JPL
59939	1999 RW_{192}	—	September 13, 1999	Socorro	LINEAR	·	7.1 km	MPC · JPL
59940	1999 RT_{197}	—	September 8, 1999	Socorro	LINEAR	·	1.9 km	MPC · JPL
59941	1999 RX_{197}	—	September 8, 1999	Socorro	LINEAR	VER	11 km	MPC · JPL
59942	1999 RZ_{197}	—	September 8, 1999	Socorro	LINEAR	EOS	6.9 km	MPC · JPL
59943	1999 RH_{198}	—	September 9, 1999	Socorro	LINEAR	TIR	4.0 km	MPC · JPL
59944	1999 RJ_{199}	—	September 8, 1999	Socorro	LINEAR	EOS	5.4 km	MPC · JPL
59945	1999 RH_{202}	—	September 8, 1999	Socorro	LINEAR	·	8.9 km	MPC · JPL
59946	1999 RG_{205}	—	September 8, 1999	Socorro	LINEAR	·	9.3 km	MPC · JPL
59947	1999 RV_{205}	—	September 8, 1999	Socorro	LINEAR	EOS	4.8 km	MPC · JPL
59948	1999 RX_{213}	—	September 13, 1999	Kitt Peak	Spacewatch	EOS	4.2 km	MPC · JPL
59949	1999 RL_{215}	—	September 3, 1999	Anderson Mesa	LONEOS	NYS	3.1 km	MPC · JPL
59950	1999 RA_{220}	—	September 4, 1999	Anderson Mesa	LONEOS	EOS	9.0 km	MPC · JPL
59951	1999 RZ_{220}	—	September 5, 1999	Anderson Mesa	LONEOS	·	1.7 km	MPC · JPL
59952	1999 RG_{222}	—	September 7, 1999	Anderson Mesa	LONEOS	·	2.9 km	MPC · JPL
59953	1999 RB_{226}	—	September 4, 1999	Catalina	CSS	·	9.0 km	MPC · JPL
59954	1999 RP_{226}	—	September 5, 1999	Catalina	CSS	·	5.3 km	MPC · JPL
59955	1999 RX_{226}	—	September 5, 1999	Catalina	CSS	EOS ·	5.1 km	MPC · JPL
59956	1999 RR_{230}	—	September 8, 1999	Catalina	CSS	EOS	6.7 km	MPC · JPL
59957	1999 RH_{231}	—	September 8, 1999	Catalina	CSS	·	4.0 km	MPC · JPL
59958	1999 RJ_{231}	—	September 8, 1999	Catalina	CSS	EOS	6.1 km	MPC · JPL
59959	1999 RV_{233}	—	September 8, 1999	Catalina	CSS	·	9.3 km	MPC · JPL
59960	1999 RY_{233}	—	September 8, 1999	Catalina	CSS	DOR	5.9 km	MPC · JPL
59961	1999 RZ_{233}	—	September 8, 1999	Catalina	CSS	·	4.9 km	MPC · JPL
59962	1999 RL_{234}	—	September 8, 1999	Catalina	CSS	·	3.8 km	MPC · JPL
59963	1999 RZ_{234}	—	September 8, 1999	Catalina	CSS	·	14 km	MPC · JPL
59964 Pierremartin	1999 RM_{235}	Pierremartin	September 8, 1999	Catalina	CSS	·	8.8 km	MPC · JPL
59965	1999 RJ_{236}	—	September 8, 1999	Catalina	CSS	EOS	5.0 km	MPC · JPL
59966	1999 RS_{238}	—	September 8, 1999	Catalina	CSS	EOS	4.1 km	MPC · JPL
59967	1999 RP_{240}	—	September 11, 1999	Anderson Mesa	LONEOS	·	12 km	MPC · JPL
59968	1999 RC_{241}	—	September 11, 1999	Anderson Mesa	LONEOS	·	6.3 km	MPC · JPL
59969	1999 RV_{246}	—	September 4, 1999	Catalina	CSS	·	5.7 km	MPC · JPL
59970 Morate	1999 RZ_{246}	Morate	September 4, 1999	Anderson Mesa	LONEOS	NYS	3.9 km	MPC · JPL
59971	1999 RP_{247}	—	September 5, 1999	Anderson Mesa	LONEOS	·	2.1 km	MPC · JPL
59972	1999 RL_{248}	—	September 7, 1999	Catalina	CSS	·	4.1 km	MPC · JPL
59973	1999 RY_{252}	—	September 8, 1999	Socorro	LINEAR	CYB	11 km	MPC · JPL
59974	1999 RM_{254}	—	September 8, 1999	Catalina	CSS	·	4.9 km	MPC · JPL
59975	1999 SE	—	September 16, 1999	Višnjan Observatory	K. Korlević	·	4.6 km	MPC · JPL
59976	1999 SU_{4}	—	September 29, 1999	Catalina	CSS	·	7.2 km	MPC · JPL
59977	1999 SD_{5}	—	September 30, 1999	Socorro	LINEAR	·	9.6 km	MPC · JPL
59978	1999 SR_{5}	—	September 30, 1999	Socorro	LINEAR	H	1.4 km	MPC · JPL
59979	1999 SV_{5}	—	September 30, 1999	Socorro	LINEAR	H	1.3 km	MPC · JPL
59980 Moza	1999 SG_{6}	Moza	September 30, 1999	Socorro	LINEAR	EOS	8.0 km	MPC · JPL
59981	1999 SZ_{6}	—	September 29, 1999	Socorro	LINEAR	·	3.4 km	MPC · JPL
59982	1999 SF_{9}	—	September 29, 1999	Socorro	LINEAR	EOS	8.0 km	MPC · JPL
59983	1999 SN_{10}	—	September 29, 1999	Overberg	van Staden, A.	EOS	6.7 km	MPC · JPL
59984	1999 SZ_{10}	—	September 30, 1999	Catalina	CSS	·	4.4 km	MPC · JPL
59985	1999 SN_{11}	—	September 30, 1999	Catalina	CSS	·	7.5 km	MPC · JPL
59986	1999 SE_{15}	—	September 29, 1999	Catalina	CSS	·	9.4 km	MPC · JPL
59987	1999 SG_{16}	—	September 29, 1999	Catalina	CSS	·	9.2 km	MPC · JPL
59988	1999 SH_{16}	—	September 29, 1999	Catalina	CSS	·	7.6 km	MPC · JPL
59989	1999 SL_{16}	—	September 29, 1999	Catalina	CSS	·	1.9 km	MPC · JPL
59990	1999 SA_{17}	—	September 30, 1999	Catalina	CSS	·	7.3 km	MPC · JPL
59991	1999 SP_{18}	—	September 30, 1999	Socorro	LINEAR	·	8.7 km	MPC · JPL
59992	1999 SZ_{18}	—	September 30, 1999	Socorro	LINEAR	EOS	5.1 km	MPC · JPL
59993	1999 SL_{20}	—	September 30, 1999	Socorro	LINEAR	·	13 km	MPC · JPL
59994	1999 SH_{22}	—	September 30, 1999	Socorro	LINEAR	·	2.7 km	MPC · JPL
59995	1999 SP_{24}	—	September 30, 1999	Catalina	CSS	EOS	4.9 km	MPC · JPL
59996	1999 TZ	—	October 1, 1999	Višnjan Observatory	K. Korlević	·	2.5 km	MPC · JPL
59997	1999 TN_{1}	—	October 1, 1999	Višnjan Observatory	K. Korlević	TIR	3.4 km	MPC · JPL
59998	1999 TS_{2}	—	October 2, 1999	Fountain Hills	C. W. Juels	·	17 km	MPC · JPL
59999	1999 TP_{3}	—	October 3, 1999	High Point	D. K. Chesney	EOS	7.8 km	MPC · JPL
60000 Miminko	1999 TZ_{3}	Miminko	October 2, 1999	Ondřejov	L. Kotková	·	5.1 km	MPC · JPL

back to top

== See also ==
- Meanings of minor-planet names: 59001–60000
