= Mozza =

Mozza may refer to:

- A nickname of:
  - Morrissey (born 1959), English musician
  - Andy Morrison (born 1970), Scottish footballer
  - Adrian Morley (born 1977), English rugby footballer
- A short form for Mozzarella.
