= Meanings of minor-planet names: 59001–60000 =

As minor planet discoveries are confirmed, they are given a permanent number by the IAU's Minor Planet Center (MPC), and the discoverers can then submit names for them, following the IAU's naming conventions. The list below concerns those minor planets in the specified number-range that have received names, and explains the meanings of those names.

Official naming citations of newly named small Solar System bodies are approved and published in a bulletin by IAU's Working Group for Small Bodies Nomenclature (WGSBN). Before May 2021, citations were published in MPC's Minor Planet Circulars for many decades. Recent citations can also be found on the JPL Small-Body Database (SBDB). Until his death in 2016, German astronomer Lutz D. Schmadel compiled these citations into the Dictionary of Minor Planet Names (DMP) and regularly updated the collection.

Based on Paul Herget's The Names of the Minor Planets, Schmadel also researched the unclear origin of numerous asteroids, most of which had been named prior to World War II. This article incorporates text from this source, which is in the public domain: SBDB New namings may only be added to this list below after official publication as the preannouncement of names is condemned. The WGSBN publishes a comprehensive guideline for the naming rules of non-cometary small Solar System bodies.

== 59001–59100 ==
Named minor planet	Provisional	This minor planet was named for...	Ref · Catalog
59001 Senftenberg	1998 SZ_{35}	Žamberk (Senftenberg), a Czech town in eastern Bohemia, where two comets were discovered by Theodor Brorsen in 1851, and where theologian and natural scientist Prokop Diviš, astronomer August Seydler and surgeon Eduard Albert were born.	JPL · 59001
59045 Gérardlemaitre	1998 TR_{2}	Gérard R. Lemaitre (b. 1943), a French astronomer.	IAU · 59045
59067 Claudiaangeli	1998 VS_{1}	Claudia Angeli, Brazilian astronomer.	IAU · 59067
59068 Pierrebourget	1998 VZ_{1}	Pierre Bourget, French research engineer at the European Southern Observatory.	IAU · 59068
59087 Maccacaro	1998 VT_{33}	Tommaso Maccacaro (born 1951), an Italian astrophysicist who has worked in high-energy astrophysics and x-ray astronomy since 1976. He is currently director of the INAF-Brera Astronomical Observatory in Milan and chairman of the European Space Agency Astronomy Working Group (2007–2009).	JPL · 59087

== 59101–59200 ==
back to top

Named minor planet	Provisional	This minor planet was named for...	Ref · Catalog
59122 Bienaymé	1998 XJ_{15}	Irenée Jules Bienaymé, French mathematician.	IAU · 59122
59162 Olivierbienaymé	1998 YX_{10}	Olivier Bienaymé, French astronomer.	IAU · 59162
59199 Jorisbossard	1999 BH_{6}	Joris Bossard, French space enthusiast and science communicator	IAU · 59199

== 59201–59300 ==
back to top

Named minor planet	Provisional	This minor planet was named for...	Ref · Catalog
59211 Bernardfort	1999 BS_{13}	Bernard Fort, French astronomer.	IAU · 59211
59232 Sfiligoi	1999 CA_{1}	Vincenzo Sfiligoi (born 1932), a public accountant in the Italian province of Gorizia until 1990, also did service as mayor of the small town of Farra d'Isonzo. A member of the Circolo Culturale Astronomico di Farra since 1985, he was for many years chief auditor and then senior arbitrator in the club management.	JPL · 59232
59238 Lilin	1999 CN_{2}	Li Lin (1923–2002), physicist and academician of the Chinese Academy of Sciences.	JPL · 59238
59239 Alhazen	1999 CR_{2}	Ibn al-Haytham (965–1040), medieval Arab astronomer, mathematician, doctor, philosopher and physicist. "Alhazen" is his Latinized name. His work mainly dealt with the study of the visual phenomenon and with optical geometry. The name was suggested by P. Venzi.	JPL · 59239
59248 Genevièvesoucail	1999 CG_{13}	Geneviève Soucail, French astronomer.	IAU · 59248

== 59301–59400 ==
back to top

Named minor planet	Provisional	This minor planet was named for...	Ref · Catalog
59369 Chanco	1999 EB_{5}	"Chanco" is a toponym used by the Flemish scientist-author Godefroy Wendelin (1580–1667), who named the Belgian city of Genk as Chanco in the Leges Salicae Illustratae. It is the oldest written name in the old Franco-German language, meaning "stallion". Name suggested by G. Canonaco.	JPL · 59369
59381 Yannickmellier	1999 FZ_{5}	Yannick Mellier, French astrophysicist.	IAU · 59381
59384 Tomgiovannetti	1999 FH_{10}	Tommaso Giovannetti, Italian amateur astronomer.	IAU · 59384
59388 Monod	1999 FU_{19}	Jacques Monod (1910–1976), French molecular biologist and 1965 Nobelist for his work on the synthesis of proteins. He wrote also about epistemology, as in his book Chance and Necessity.	JPL · 59388
59389 Oskarvonmiller	1999 FF_{21}	Oskar von Miller (1855–1934), a German engineer and founder of Deutsches Museum in Munich. He managed and built the then-largest high pressure hydroelectric power station and proposed the world's first projection planetarium, MODEL I (1925). Name suggested by the Deutsches Museum.	JPL · 59389
59390 Habermas	1999 FR_{21}	Jürgen Habermas (born 1929), German philosopher, political scientist and sociologist, member of the Frankfurt Institute for Social Research. He worked on the process of formation of public opinion and ideas, as well as on rational discussion and thinking.	JPL · 59390

== 59401–59500 ==
back to top

Named minor planet	Provisional	This minor planet was named for...	Ref · Catalog
59417 Giocasilli	1999 GD_{1}	Giovanni Casilli (born 1949), an Italian astronomer-technician who joined the staff of the Rome Observatory in 1989. Since then he has worked at the Campo Imperatore station as a technician, providing his assistance to the Campo Imperatore Near-Earth Object Survey.	JPL · 59417
59419 Prešov	1999 GE_{2}	Prešov, a city in eastern Slovakia, birthplace of the seconde discoverer, Štefan Gajdoš. Dating from 1247, the city is the historical and cultural center of the Šariš region of northeastern Slovakia. A public observatory and young astronomers club were established there in 1968.	JPL · 59419
59425 Xuyangsheng	1999 GJ_{5}	Xu Yangsheng (born 1958) is a leading expert in Robotics and Intelligent Systems, and an Academician of the Chinese Academy of Engineering, He is an Academician of the IAA and a Fellow of the IEEE. Xu was appointed the first President of the Chinese University of Hong Kong, Shenzhen	JPL · 59425
59470 Paveltoufar	1999 HM	Pavel Toufar (1948–2018) was a Czech journalist and writer. He was known for his popular, yet precise, articles, books and interviews about astronautics based on primary sources as well as on his personal experiences (e.g., with isolation experiments).	JPL · 59470
59483 Corranplain	1999 HN_{11}	Corran Daemon Plain (1999–2024) was a volunteer editor of the English Wikipedia under the username Vami_IV, described in the WGSBN Bulletin as "one of the most impactful editors the online encyclopedia has ever had".	JPL · 59483

== 59501–59600 ==
back to top

Named minor planet	Provisional	This minor planet was named for...	Ref · Catalog
There are no named minor planets in this number range

== 59601–59700 ==
back to top

Named minor planet	Provisional	This minor planet was named for...	Ref · Catalog
There are no named minor planets in this number range

== 59701–59800 ==
back to top

Named minor planet	Provisional	This minor planet was named for...	Ref · Catalog
59793 Clapiès	1999 OD	Jean de Clapiès (1670–1740), French mathematician and cartographer who was involved with Plantade in the observations of the 1706 total solar eclipse from Montpellier's Babote Tower.	JPL · 59793
59797 Píšala	1999 PX	Jan Píšala (born 1982) is a Czech astronomy populariser, and the author of many popular science publications, as well as audiovisual shows at the Brno Observatory and Planetarium. He is a graduate nuclear chemist, one of the main leaders of the Astronomical Expedition and also a great colleague and friend.	JPL · 59797
59800 Astropis	1999 PV_{4}	Astropis, a Czech astronomy magazine. Since its first issue in 1994, the popular-science magagzine has earned an excellent reputation in the Czech amateur astronomy community. It publishes original articles and news on astronomy, astrophysics, astronautics and related fields, as well as on astronomical phenomena and hints and directions for observations (Src).	MPC · 59800

== 59801–59900 ==
back to top

Named minor planet	Provisional	This minor planet was named for...	Ref · Catalog
59804 Dickjoyce	1999 RJ_{1}	Richard R. Joyce (1944-2026) was an American astronomer at the National Optical Astronomy Observatory who studied late-type stars and mass loss using infrared spectroscopy. He was also an expert in infrared instrumentation development.	JPL · 59804
59828 Ossikar	1999 RU_{32}	"Ossikar", a cartoon-figure created by German caricaturist Manfred Sondermann, father-in-law of the discoverer Gerhard Lehmann. Ossikar, the main hero of many caricatures with everyday-life humor, appeared in numerous magazines during 1991–2006 and in a book in 1993.	JPL · 59828
59830 Reynek	1999 RE_{33}	Bohuslav Reynek (1892–1971) was a Czech poet and graphic artist. His work was inspired by the Czech landscape, rural life and Christian humanism. He spent most of his life in the small village of Petrkov in the Bohemian-Moravian Highlands. He was married to the French poet Suzanne Renaud.	JPL · 59830
59833 Danimatter	1999 RZ_{36}	Daniel Matter (born 1957), French amateur astronomer, discoverer of minor planets, and friend of Christophe Demeautis, who discovered this minor planet	JPL · 59833

== 59901–60000 ==
back to top

Named minor planet	Provisional	This minor planet was named for...	Ref · Catalog
59964 Pierremartin	1999 RM_{235}	Rene Pierre Martin (born 1964) is an astronomer who held post doc fellowships with Steward Observatory, and with the ESO NTT in Chile. He was director at both the CFHT and the WIYN 3.5-m Observatory. He teaches astronomy and inspires young minds at UH Hilo. He is a drummer, like his idol Neil Peart.	IAU · 59964
59970 Morate	1999 RZ_{246}	David Morate (born 1988) is a postdoctoral researcher at the Observatorio Nacional (Rio de Janeiro, Brazil) researching the spectral characterization of the families of primitive asteroids in the inner asteroid belt.	IAU · 59970
59980 Moza	1999 SG_{6}	Moza, a type of precious pearl found in the Arabian gulf and harvested by states such as the United Arab Emirates, which is planning a mission to the asteroid, MBR Explorer.	JPL · 59980
60000 Miminko	1999 TZ_{3}	"Miminko", a Czech word that expresses the innocence of the very beginning of human life	JPL · 60000

back to top

Preceded by 58,001–59,000	Meanings of minor-planet names List of minor planets: 59,001–60,000	Succeeded by 60,001–61,000
