= Mossa =

Mossa may refer to:

== People ==
- Gustav-Adolf Mossa (1883-1971), French illustrator and writer
- Mossa (footballer) (born 1989), Spanish football player
- Mossa Bildner, Brazilian multi-disciplinary artist
- Carlos Mossa (born 1939), Brazilian hurdler
- Vera Mossa (born 1964), Brazilian volleyball player
- Vico Mossa (1914-2003), Italian architect and writer
- Yasmín Esquivel Mossa (born 1963), Mexican lawyer and public official
- Pariah (Kell Mossa), DC Comics character

== Places ==
- Mossa, Friuli Venezia Giulia, Italy
- Santa Catalina de Mossa District, Peru
