= Muss =

Muss or MUSS may refer to:

- Eiryn Muss, a secondary character in The Well of Echoes
- Jake "the Muss" Heke, a fictional character in Once Were Warriors
- Stephen Muss (1928–2025), American real estate developer
- Sancti Spíritus Airport, Cuba, ICAO code MUSS
- MUSS (countermeasure), an active protection system to protect military vehicles
