= Tahiry Mosa =

Malagasy politician

Tahiry Mosa is a Malagasy politician. He is a member of the Senate of Madagascar for Anosy.
