= Moussier =

Moussier is both a surname and a given name. Notable people with the name include:

- Jeanine Moussier (1930–2024), French sprinter
- Sabine Moussier (born 1968), German-Mexican actress
- Moussier Tombola (born 1987), Senegalese-French comedian
- Jean Baptiste Moussier (died 1831), French-Louisianian slave trader
