= 8306 Shoko =

Main-belt asteroid

Discovery
- Discovered by: A. Nakamura
- Discovery site: Kuma Kogen Obs.
- Discovery date: 24 February 1995

Designations
- Named after: Shoko Sawada (Japanese singer)
- Alternative designations: 1995 DY_{1} · 1986 QA_{6}
- Minor planet category: main-belt · (inner); Flora

Orbital characteristics
- Epoch 23 March 2018 (JD 2458200.5)
- Uncertainty parameter 0
- Observation arc: 31.41 yr (11,474 d)
- Aphelion: 2.7366 AU
- Perihelion: 1.7455 AU
- Semi-major axis: 2.2411 AU
- Eccentricity: 0.2211
- Orbital period (sidereal): 3.35 yr (1,225 d)
- Mean anomaly: 126.86°
- Mean motion: 0° 17^{m} 37.68^{s} / day
- Inclination: 4.7821°
- Longitude of ascending node: 208.66°
- Argument of perihelion: 143.48°
- Known satellites: 1 (D: 1.28 km P: 36.20 h)

Physical characteristics
- Mean diameter: 2.38 km (calculated); 3.21 km (estimate)
- Synodic rotation period: 3.3503±0.0002 h 3.604±0.002 h
- Geometric albedo: 0.24 (assumed)
- Spectral type: S (assumed)
- Absolute magnitude (H): 14.83±0.07 (R); 14.9; 15.28

8306 Shoko, provisional designation 1995 DY_{1}, is a Florian asteroid and a synchronous binary system from the inner regions of the asteroid belt, approximately 3 kilometers (2 miles) in diameter. It was discovered on 24 February 1995, by Japanese astronomer Akimasa Nakamura at the Kuma Kogen Astronomical Observatory in southern Japan, who named it after Japanese singer-songwriter Shoko Sawada. The likely S-type asteroid has a rotation period of 3.35 hours. The discovery of its 1.3-kilometer minor-planet moon was announced in December 2013.

== Orbit and classification ==
Shoko is a member of the Flora family (402), a giant asteroid family and the largest family of stony asteroids in the main-belt. It orbits the Sun in the inner asteroid belt at a distance of 1.7–2.7 AU once every 3 years and 4 months (1,225 days; semi-major axis of 2.24 AU). Its orbit has an eccentricity of 0.22 and an inclination of 5° with respect to the ecliptic. The body's observation arc begins with its first observation as 1986 QA_{6} at the Siding Spring Observatory in August 1986, nearly 9 years prior to its official discovery observation at Kuma Kogen.

== Physical characteristics ==
Shoko is an assumed, stony S-type asteroid, which is also the overall spectral type of the Florian asteroids. It has an absolute magnitude between 14.83 and 15.28.

=== Rotation period ===
In September and October 2013, two rotational lightcurves of Shoko were obtained from photometric observations by astronomers Petr Pravec and David Polishook. Lightcurve analysis gave a well-defined rotation period of 3.3503 and 3.604 hours with a low brightness amplitude of 0.11 and 0.10 magnitude, respectively (U=3/3).

=== Diameter and albedo ===
The Collaborative Asteroid Lightcurve Link assumes an albedo of 0.24 – derived from 8 Flora, the parent body of the Flora family – and calculates a diameter of 2.38 kilometers based on an absolute magnitude of 15.28, while the Johnston's Archive estimates a diameter 3.21.

=== Satellite ===
In October 2013, photometric observations by Petr Pravec and a large international collaboration, revealed, that Shoko is an synchronous binary asteroid with a minor-planet moon orbiting it every 36.20 hours (1.508 days) at an estimated average distance of 9.4 km. The discovery was announced in December 2013. The mutual occultation events suggest the presence of a satellite with a diameter 1.28 km or more than 40% the size of its primary. The discoverers also suspect that there might be a possible third body, which would make it a rare triple asteroid. As of 2018, no follow-up observations have been conducted.

== Naming ==
This minor planet was named by the discoverer after Japanese singer-songwriter of ballads and pop songs, Shoko Sawada (born 1962), who has recorded a large number of studio albums since her debut in 1979. The official naming citation was published by the Minor Planet Center on 10 June 1998 (M.P.C. 32095).
