= List of minor planets: 129001–130000 =

The following is a partial list of minor planets, running from minor-planet number 129001 through 130000, inclusive. The primary data for this and other partial lists is based on JPL's "Small-Body Orbital Elements" and data available from the Minor Planet Center. Critical list information is also provided by the MPC, unless otherwise specified from Lowell Observatory. A detailed description of the table's columns and additional sources are given on the main page including a complete list of every page in this series, and a statistical break-up on the dynamical classification of minor planets.

Also see the summary list of all named bodies in numerical and alphabetical order, and the corresponding naming citations for the number range of this particular list. New namings may only be added to this list after official publication, as the preannouncement of names is condemned by the Working Group for Small Bodies Nomenclature of the International Astronomical Union.

Near-Earth obj.	MBA (inner)	MBA (outer)	Centaur
Mars-crosser	MBA (middle)	Jupiter trojan	Trans-Neptunian obj.
Unclassified

== 129001–129100 ==
Designation			Discovery			Properties		Ref
Permanent	Provisional	Named after	Date	Site	Discoverer(s)	Category	Diam.	Ref
129001	2004 TY_{247}	—	October 7, 2004	Socorro	LINEAR	·	5.6 km	MPC · JPL
129002	2004 TR_{256}	—	October 9, 2004	Kitt Peak	Spacewatch	T_{j} (2.99) · HIL · 3:2	7.0 km	MPC · JPL
129003	2004 TJ_{268}	—	October 9, 2004	Kitt Peak	Spacewatch	·	3.5 km	MPC · JPL
129004	2004 TS_{286}	—	October 9, 2004	Socorro	LINEAR	·	1.9 km	MPC · JPL
129005	2004 TK_{291}	—	October 10, 2004	Kitt Peak	Spacewatch	·	2.2 km	MPC · JPL
129006	2004 TV_{294}	—	October 10, 2004	Kitt Peak	Spacewatch	·	2.8 km	MPC · JPL
129007	2004 TP_{296}	—	October 10, 2004	Kitt Peak	Spacewatch	T_{j} (2.99) · 3:2	6.0 km	MPC · JPL
129008	2004 TV_{296}	—	October 10, 2004	Kitt Peak	Spacewatch	·	2.7 km	MPC · JPL
129009	2004 TT_{302}	—	October 9, 2004	Socorro	LINEAR	KOR	2.3 km	MPC · JPL
129010	2004 TB_{303}	—	October 9, 2004	Kitt Peak	Spacewatch	·	1.5 km	MPC · JPL
129011	2004 TG_{306}	—	October 10, 2004	Socorro	LINEAR	EOS	3.2 km	MPC · JPL
129012	2004 TM_{307}	—	October 10, 2004	Socorro	LINEAR	V	1.2 km	MPC · JPL
129013	2004 TX_{310}	—	October 10, 2004	Socorro	LINEAR	EOS	3.6 km	MPC · JPL
129014	2004 TE_{317}	—	October 11, 2004	Kitt Peak	Spacewatch	·	3.3 km	MPC · JPL
129015	2004 TJ_{321}	—	October 11, 2004	Palomar	NEAT	·	5.5 km	MPC · JPL
129016	2004 TS_{321}	—	October 11, 2004	Kitt Peak	Spacewatch	AGN	1.8 km	MPC · JPL
129017	2004 TD_{324}	—	October 11, 2004	Kitt Peak	Spacewatch	·	3.5 km	MPC · JPL
129018	2004 TF_{324}	—	October 11, 2004	Kitt Peak	Spacewatch	KOR	2.2 km	MPC · JPL
129019	2004 TS_{325}	—	October 13, 2004	Kitt Peak	Spacewatch	·	3.1 km	MPC · JPL
129020	2004 TL_{328}	—	October 4, 2004	Palomar	NEAT	V	1.3 km	MPC · JPL
129021	2004 TS_{330}	—	October 9, 2004	Socorro	LINEAR	·	2.3 km	MPC · JPL
129022	2004 TM_{335}	—	October 10, 2004	Kitt Peak	Spacewatch	MAS	1.3 km	MPC · JPL
129023	2004 TB_{336}	—	October 10, 2004	Kitt Peak	Spacewatch	·	3.1 km	MPC · JPL
129024	2004 TA_{339}	—	October 12, 2004	Anderson Mesa	LONEOS	·	5.4 km	MPC · JPL
129025	2004 TX_{343}	—	October 14, 2004	Kitt Peak	Spacewatch	·	3.9 km	MPC · JPL
129026 Conormcmenamin	2004 TE_{345}	Conormcmenamin	October 15, 2004	Mount Lemmon	Mount Lemmon Survey	·	6.7 km	MPC · JPL
129027	2004 TJ_{345}	—	October 15, 2004	Haleakala	NEAT	·	5.8 km	MPC · JPL
129028	2004 TR_{346}	—	October 15, 2004	Anderson Mesa	LONEOS	·	1.4 km	MPC · JPL
129029	2004 TQ_{348}	—	October 7, 2004	Kitt Peak	Spacewatch	V	1.1 km	MPC · JPL
129030	2004 TR_{349}	—	October 9, 2004	Socorro	LINEAR	·	2.9 km	MPC · JPL
129031	2004 TW_{349}	—	October 9, 2004	Kitt Peak	Spacewatch	KOR	2.3 km	MPC · JPL
129032	2004 TS_{356}	—	October 14, 2004	Anderson Mesa	LONEOS	·	9.3 km	MPC · JPL
129033	2004 TV_{356}	—	October 14, 2004	Anderson Mesa	LONEOS	ADE	4.4 km	MPC · JPL
129034	2004 TH_{360}	—	October 10, 2004	Socorro	LINEAR	·	4.0 km	MPC · JPL
129035	2004 US_{2}	—	October 18, 2004	Socorro	LINEAR	·	4.9 km	MPC · JPL
129036	2004 UC_{4}	—	October 16, 2004	Socorro	LINEAR	·	5.9 km	MPC · JPL
129037	2004 UL_{4}	—	October 16, 2004	Socorro	LINEAR	·	4.5 km	MPC · JPL
129038	2004 UY_{4}	—	October 16, 2004	Socorro	LINEAR	TIN	3.4 km	MPC · JPL
129039	2004 UC_{5}	—	October 18, 2004	Socorro	LINEAR	EOS	3.3 km	MPC · JPL
129040	2004 UY_{5}	—	October 20, 2004	Socorro	LINEAR	EOS	3.4 km	MPC · JPL
129041	2004 UV_{7}	—	October 21, 2004	Socorro	LINEAR	·	4.5 km	MPC · JPL
129042	2004 VF_{2}	—	November 2, 2004	Anderson Mesa	LONEOS	·	7.1 km	MPC · JPL
129043	2004 VN_{3}	—	November 3, 2004	Kitt Peak	Spacewatch	·	2.2 km	MPC · JPL
129044	2004 VW_{3}	—	November 3, 2004	Kitt Peak	Spacewatch	·	4.5 km	MPC · JPL
129045	2004 VR_{4}	—	November 3, 2004	Anderson Mesa	LONEOS	·	2.4 km	MPC · JPL
129046	2004 VY_{4}	—	November 3, 2004	Anderson Mesa	LONEOS	·	5.5 km	MPC · JPL
129047	2004 VR_{5}	—	November 3, 2004	Anderson Mesa	LONEOS	NAE	5.4 km	MPC · JPL
129048	2004 VV_{5}	—	November 3, 2004	Kitt Peak	Spacewatch	·	4.7 km	MPC · JPL
129049	2004 VQ_{6}	—	November 3, 2004	Kitt Peak	Spacewatch	·	1.2 km	MPC · JPL
129050 Lowellcogburn	2004 VW_{9}	Lowellcogburn	November 3, 2004	Catalina	CSS	·	2.1 km	MPC · JPL
129051 Chrismay	2004 VO_{10}	Chrismay	November 3, 2004	Catalina	CSS	·	3.7 km	MPC · JPL
129052 Nîmeshdave	2004 VC_{11}	Nîmeshdave	November 3, 2004	Catalina	CSS	·	6.1 km	MPC · JPL
129053 Derekshannon	2004 VP_{12}	Derekshannon	November 3, 2004	Catalina	CSS	·	6.7 km	MPC · JPL
129054	2004 VM_{13}	—	November 1, 2004	Palomar	NEAT	EUN	2.7 km	MPC · JPL
129055	2004 VC_{16}	—	November 5, 2004	Palomar	NEAT	·	2.4 km	MPC · JPL
129056	2004 VQ_{17}	—	November 3, 2004	Kitt Peak	Spacewatch	·	3.8 km	MPC · JPL
129057	2004 VL_{18}	—	November 4, 2004	Kitt Peak	Spacewatch	KOR	2.3 km	MPC · JPL
129058	2004 VQ_{18}	—	November 4, 2004	Kitt Peak	Spacewatch	·	2.3 km	MPC · JPL
129059	2004 VS_{18}	—	November 4, 2004	Kitt Peak	Spacewatch	TIR	5.0 km	MPC · JPL
129060 Huntskretsch	2004 VH_{21}	Huntskretsch	November 4, 2004	Catalina	CSS	·	5.1 km	MPC · JPL
129061 Karlfortney	2004 VM_{22}	Karlfortney	November 4, 2004	Catalina	CSS	EOS	3.1 km	MPC · JPL
129062	2004 VL_{25}	—	November 4, 2004	Anderson Mesa	LONEOS	·	4.4 km	MPC · JPL
129063 Joshwood	2004 VF_{26}	Joshwood	November 4, 2004	Catalina	CSS	EOS	4.3 km	MPC · JPL
129064 Jeanneladewig	2004 VT_{26}	Jeanneladewig	November 4, 2004	Catalina	CSS	·	5.2 km	MPC · JPL
129065	2004 VV_{27}	—	November 5, 2004	Palomar	NEAT	·	5.4 km	MPC · JPL
129066	2004 VY_{28}	—	November 7, 2004	Wrightwood	J. W. Young	·	3.7 km	MPC · JPL
129067	2004 VD_{31}	—	November 3, 2004	Kitt Peak	Spacewatch	NYS	1.2 km	MPC · JPL
129068 Alexmay	2004 VU_{52}	Alexmay	November 4, 2004	Catalina	CSS	·	2.8 km	MPC · JPL
129069	2004 VD_{53}	—	November 5, 2004	Palomar	NEAT	THM	3.8 km	MPC · JPL
129070	2004 VV_{53}	—	November 7, 2004	Socorro	LINEAR	EOS	3.3 km	MPC · JPL
129071 Catriegle	2004 VF_{54}	Catriegle	November 3, 2004	Catalina	CSS	·	6.2 km	MPC · JPL
129072	2004 VD_{57}	—	November 5, 2004	Socorro	LINEAR	·	3.8 km	MPC · JPL
129073 Sandyfreund	2004 VP_{59}	Sandyfreund	November 9, 2004	Catalina	CSS	·	4.8 km	MPC · JPL
129074	2004 VE_{61}	—	November 5, 2004	Palomar	NEAT	·	4.2 km	MPC · JPL
129075	2004 VA_{62}	—	November 6, 2004	Socorro	LINEAR	·	6.2 km	MPC · JPL
129076	2004 VB_{62}	—	November 6, 2004	Socorro	LINEAR	·	4.0 km	MPC · JPL
129077	2004 VC_{62}	—	November 6, 2004	Socorro	LINEAR	EOS	3.3 km	MPC · JPL
129078 Animoo	2004 VL_{65}	Animoo	November 8, 2004	Vicques	M. Ory	·	1.5 km	MPC · JPL
129079	2004 VZ_{70}	—	November 7, 2004	Socorro	LINEAR	3:2	8.6 km	MPC · JPL
129080	2004 VM_{73}	—	November 6, 2004	Socorro	LINEAR	CYB	7.0 km	MPC · JPL
129081	2004 VH_{75}	—	November 14, 2004	Cordell-Lorenz	Cordell-Lorenz	EOS	3.4 km	MPC · JPL
129082 Oliviabillett	2004 VK_{76}	Oliviabillett	November 12, 2004	Catalina	CSS	·	1.3 km	MPC · JPL
129083	2004 VC_{80}	—	November 3, 2004	Anderson Mesa	LONEOS	·	5.0 km	MPC · JPL
129084	2004 VM_{88}	—	November 11, 2004	Kitt Peak	Spacewatch	·	4.0 km	MPC · JPL
129085	2004 VY_{88}	—	November 11, 2004	Kitt Peak	Spacewatch	·	4.8 km	MPC · JPL
129086	2004 VK_{89}	—	November 11, 2004	Kitt Peak	Spacewatch	·	3.0 km	MPC · JPL
129087	2004 VW_{90}	—	November 3, 2004	Kitt Peak	Spacewatch	KOR	2.3 km	MPC · JPL
129088	2004 VE_{91}	—	November 3, 2004	Anderson Mesa	LONEOS	EOS	3.6 km	MPC · JPL
129089	2004 VX_{91}	—	November 3, 2004	Palomar	NEAT	HOF	4.6 km	MPC · JPL
129090	2004 WB	—	November 17, 2004	Siding Spring	SSS	VER	5.0 km	MPC · JPL
129091	2004 WE_{5}	—	November 18, 2004	Socorro	LINEAR	·	4.3 km	MPC · JPL
129092 Snowdonia	2004 WB_{10}	Snowdonia	November 19, 2004	Haleakala-Faulkes	Faulkes Telescope Educational Project	·	3.8 km	MPC · JPL
129093	2004 WR_{10}	—	November 19, 2004	Anderson Mesa	LONEOS	·	5.6 km	MPC · JPL
129094	2004 XZ	—	December 1, 2004	Palomar	NEAT	·	5.2 km	MPC · JPL
129095 Martyschmitzer	2004 XC_{1}	Martyschmitzer	December 1, 2004	Catalina	CSS	·	2.7 km	MPC · JPL
129096 Andrewleung	2004 XU_{1}	Andrewleung	December 1, 2004	Catalina	CSS	·	3.9 km	MPC · JPL
129097	2004 XX_{1}	—	December 1, 2004	Palomar	NEAT	·	6.6 km	MPC · JPL
129098	2004 XQ_{2}	—	December 1, 2004	Palomar	NEAT	·	3.8 km	MPC · JPL
129099 Spoelhof	2004 XU_{3}	Spoelhof	December 3, 2004	Calvin-Rehoboth	L. A. Molnar	·	5.6 km	MPC · JPL
129100 Aaronammons	2004 XY_{4}	Aaronammons	December 2, 2004	Catalina	CSS	·	3.7 km	MPC · JPL

== 129101–129200 ==
back to top

Designation			Discovery			Properties		Ref
Permanent	Provisional	Named after	Date	Site	Discoverer(s)	Category	Diam.	Ref
129101 Geoffcollyer	2004 XF_{6}	Geoffcollyer	December 9, 2004	Jarnac	Jarnac	·	4.6 km	MPC · JPL
129102 Charliecamarotte	2004 XO_{9}	Charliecamarotte	December 2, 2004	Catalina	CSS	KOR	2.4 km	MPC · JPL
129103	2004 XG_{15}	—	December 8, 2004	Socorro	LINEAR	MAS	1.0 km	MPC · JPL
129104	2004 XW_{17}	—	December 7, 2004	Socorro	LINEAR	TIR	5.4 km	MPC · JPL
129105	2004 XT_{20}	—	December 8, 2004	Socorro	LINEAR	·	5.2 km	MPC · JPL
129106	2004 XD_{21}	—	December 8, 2004	Socorro	LINEAR	·	4.0 km	MPC · JPL
129107	2004 XH_{21}	—	December 8, 2004	Socorro	LINEAR	·	4.7 km	MPC · JPL
129108 Kristianwaldorff	2004 XO_{24}	Kristianwaldorff	December 9, 2004	Catalina	CSS	·	2.5 km	MPC · JPL
129109	2004 XF_{32}	—	December 10, 2004	Socorro	LINEAR	·	3.5 km	MPC · JPL
129110	2004 XM_{40}	—	December 10, 2004	Campo Imperatore	CINEOS	·	1.4 km	MPC · JPL
129111	2004 XE_{48}	—	December 10, 2004	Socorro	LINEAR	·	5.1 km	MPC · JPL
129112	2004 XZ_{59}	—	December 12, 2004	Socorro	LINEAR	·	2.7 km	MPC · JPL
129113	2004 XT_{63}	—	December 2, 2004	Kitt Peak	Spacewatch	·	4.4 km	MPC · JPL
129114 Oliverwalthall	2004 XZ_{72}	Oliverwalthall	December 9, 2004	Catalina	CSS	·	7.1 km	MPC · JPL
129115	2004 XE_{79}	—	December 10, 2004	Socorro	LINEAR	·	4.4 km	MPC · JPL
129116	2004 XN_{102}	—	December 12, 2004	Socorro	LINEAR	URS	5.4 km	MPC · JPL
129117	2004 XZ_{105}	—	December 11, 2004	Socorro	LINEAR	·	5.5 km	MPC · JPL
129118	2004 XP_{109}	—	December 13, 2004	Kitt Peak	Spacewatch	(5)	2.4 km	MPC · JPL
129119 Ericmuhle	2004 XA_{111}	Ericmuhle	December 14, 2004	Catalina	CSS	WIT	1.8 km	MPC · JPL
129120	2004 XS_{120}	—	December 14, 2004	Socorro	LINEAR	KOR	2.8 km	MPC · JPL
129121	2004 XS_{123}	—	December 10, 2004	Socorro	LINEAR	·	2.7 km	MPC · JPL
129122	2004 XA_{126}	—	December 11, 2004	Haleakala	NEAT	·	3.7 km	MPC · JPL
129123	2004 XY_{142}	—	December 9, 2004	Kitt Peak	Spacewatch	·	2.9 km	MPC · JPL
129124	2004 XB_{144}	—	December 12, 2004	Socorro	LINEAR	·	4.8 km	MPC · JPL
129125 Chrisvoth	2004 XA_{162}	Chrisvoth	December 15, 2004	Catalina	CSS	EOS	4.4 km	MPC · JPL
129126	2004 XJ_{165}	—	December 2, 2004	Palomar	NEAT	NAE	4.7 km	MPC · JPL
129127	2004 XA_{167}	—	December 2, 2004	Palomar	NEAT	fast?	2.9 km	MPC · JPL
129128	2004 XE_{182}	—	December 14, 2004	Anderson Mesa	LONEOS	·	5.9 km	MPC · JPL
129129	2004 YJ	—	December 17, 2004	Socorro	LINEAR	·	5.4 km	MPC · JPL
129130	2004 YP_{20}	—	December 18, 2004	Mount Lemmon	Mount Lemmon Survey	L5	14 km	MPC · JPL
129131	2004 YY_{27}	—	December 17, 2004	Socorro	LINEAR	·	5.3 km	MPC · JPL
129132	2004 YS_{28}	—	December 16, 2004	Kitt Peak	Spacewatch	·	3.0 km	MPC · JPL
129133	2004 YZ_{31}	—	December 20, 2004	Mount Lemmon	Mount Lemmon Survey	L5	22 km	MPC · JPL
129134	2005 AC_{5}	—	January 6, 2005	Catalina	CSS	L5	20 km	MPC · JPL
129135	2005 AD_{21}	—	January 6, 2005	Catalina	CSS	L5	20 km	MPC · JPL
129136	2005 AM_{22}	—	January 7, 2005	Socorro	LINEAR	EOS	5.0 km	MPC · JPL
129137 Hippolochos	2005 AP_{27}	Hippolochos	January 13, 2005	Vicques	M. Ory	L5	10 km	MPC · JPL
129138 Williamfrost	2005 AN_{38}	Williamfrost	January 13, 2005	Catalina	CSS	·	1.7 km	MPC · JPL
129139	2005 AV_{48}	—	January 13, 2005	Kitt Peak	Spacewatch	THM	4.9 km	MPC · JPL
129140	2005 AO_{50}	—	January 13, 2005	Socorro	LINEAR	L5	16 km	MPC · JPL
129141	2005 AL_{57}	—	January 15, 2005	Kitt Peak	Spacewatch	EOS	2.6 km	MPC · JPL
129142	2005 AS_{60}	—	January 15, 2005	Kitt Peak	Spacewatch	L5	10 km	MPC · JPL
129143	2005 BZ_{16}	—	January 16, 2005	Socorro	LINEAR	·	1.7 km	MPC · JPL
129144	2005 BP_{25}	—	January 18, 2005	Catalina	CSS	L5	19 km	MPC · JPL
129145	2005 CE	—	February 1, 2005	Goodricke-Pigott	R. A. Tucker	L5	20 km	MPC · JPL
129146 Stevenglenn	2005 CF_{38}	Stevenglenn	February 4, 2005	Catalina	CSS	LUT	10 km	MPC · JPL
129147	2005 CY_{70}	—	February 1, 2005	Catalina	CSS	L5	19 km	MPC · JPL
129148 Sheilahaggard	2005 ET_{49}	Sheilahaggard	March 3, 2005	Catalina	CSS	·	3.1 km	MPC · JPL
129149 Richwitherspoon	2005 EP_{51}	Richwitherspoon	March 3, 2005	Catalina	CSS	·	2.2 km	MPC · JPL
129150	2005 EF_{93}	—	March 8, 2005	Socorro	LINEAR	·	2.5 km	MPC · JPL
129151 Angelaboggs	2005 EE_{99}	Angelaboggs	March 3, 2005	Catalina	CSS	·	1.9 km	MPC · JPL
129152 Jaystpierre	2005 EQ_{133}	Jaystpierre	March 9, 2005	Catalina	CSS	·	3.5 km	MPC · JPL
129153	2005 EL_{140}	—	March 10, 2005	Catalina	CSS	L5	17 km	MPC · JPL
129154 Georgesondecker	2005 EG_{188}	Georgesondecker	March 10, 2005	Mount Lemmon	Mount Lemmon Survey	NYS	1.8 km	MPC · JPL
129155	2005 EV_{260}	—	March 12, 2005	Socorro	LINEAR	·	1.3 km	MPC · JPL
129156	2005 EN_{264}	—	March 13, 2005	Kitt Peak	Spacewatch	·	3.2 km	MPC · JPL
129157	2005 ET_{305}	—	March 10, 2005	Calvin-Rehoboth	Calvin College	MAS	1.2 km	MPC · JPL
129158 Michaelmellman	2005 FD_{8}	Michaelmellman	March 30, 2005	Catalina	CSS	EOS	3.5 km	MPC · JPL
129159	2005 GS_{16}	—	April 2, 2005	Palomar	NEAT	·	3.2 km	MPC · JPL
129160 Ericpeters	2005 GH_{41}	Ericpeters	April 5, 2005	Mount Lemmon	Mount Lemmon Survey	WIT	1.5 km	MPC · JPL
129161 Mykallefevre	2005 GP_{64}	Mykallefevre	April 2, 2005	Catalina	CSS	·	2.7 km	MPC · JPL
129162	2005 GF_{65}	—	April 2, 2005	Anderson Mesa	LONEOS	·	8.7 km	MPC · JPL
129163	2005 GX_{69}	—	April 4, 2005	Kitt Peak	Spacewatch	·	3.5 km	MPC · JPL
129164	2005 GE_{97}	—	April 7, 2005	Palomar	NEAT	HNS	2.1 km	MPC · JPL
129165 Kevinstout	2005 GP_{113}	Kevinstout	April 9, 2005	Mount Lemmon	Mount Lemmon Survey	·	4.3 km	MPC · JPL
129166	2005 GX_{161}	—	April 14, 2005	Socorro	LINEAR	·	3.3 km	MPC · JPL
129167 Dianelambert	2005 JZ_{18}	Dianelambert	May 4, 2005	Mount Lemmon	Mount Lemmon Survey	·	2.9 km	MPC · JPL
129168	2005 JR_{27}	—	May 3, 2005	Socorro	LINEAR	·	3.3 km	MPC · JPL
129169	2005 JU_{77}	—	May 10, 2005	Goodricke-Pigott	R. A. Tucker	EOS	3.4 km	MPC · JPL
129170	2005 JK_{124}	—	May 11, 2005	Anderson Mesa	LONEOS	·	3.5 km	MPC · JPL
129171	2005 JE_{132}	—	May 13, 2005	Siding Spring	SSS	·	5.9 km	MPC · JPL
129172 Jodizareski	2005 JP_{137}	Jodizareski	May 13, 2005	Catalina	CSS	MAR	2.1 km	MPC · JPL
129173 Mattgoman	2005 JG_{139}	Mattgoman	May 13, 2005	Catalina	CSS	TIR	2.5 km	MPC · JPL
129174	2005 JK_{179}	—	May 14, 2005	Palomar	NEAT	·	6.2 km	MPC · JPL
129175	2005 KT_{11}	—	May 30, 2005	Siding Spring	SSS	NYS	1.9 km	MPC · JPL
129176 Gerardcarter	2005 LM_{2}	Gerardcarter	June 2, 2005	Catalina	CSS	·	6.6 km	MPC · JPL
129177 Jeanneeha	2005 LN_{2}	Jeanneeha	June 2, 2005	Catalina	CSS	·	3.6 km	MPC · JPL
129178	2005 LK_{6}	—	June 4, 2005	Kitt Peak	Spacewatch	slow	2.3 km	MPC · JPL
129179	2005 LN_{15}	—	June 4, 2005	Socorro	LINEAR	HNS	3.0 km	MPC · JPL
129180	2005 LB_{17}	—	June 6, 2005	Kitt Peak	Spacewatch	EOS	2.8 km	MPC · JPL
129181	2005 LM_{34}	—	June 10, 2005	Kitt Peak	Spacewatch	·	1.4 km	MPC · JPL
129182	2005 LK_{38}	—	June 11, 2005	Kitt Peak	Spacewatch	·	1.9 km	MPC · JPL
129183	2005 LH_{39}	—	June 11, 2005	Kitt Peak	Spacewatch	·	2.1 km	MPC · JPL
129184	2005 LL_{41}	—	June 12, 2005	Kitt Peak	Spacewatch	·	1.7 km	MPC · JPL
129185 Jonburroughs	2005 LO_{47}	Jonburroughs	June 14, 2005	Mount Lemmon	Mount Lemmon Survey	·	1.9 km	MPC · JPL
129186 Joshgrindlay	2005 LJ_{48}	Joshgrindlay	June 13, 2005	Mount Lemmon	Mount Lemmon Survey	V	1.3 km	MPC · JPL
129187 Danielalfred	2005 LB_{50}	Danielalfred	June 11, 2005	Catalina	CSS	·	2.9 km	MPC · JPL
129188 Dangallagher	2005 MM_{4}	Dangallagher	June 17, 2005	Mount Lemmon	Mount Lemmon Survey	·	4.0 km	MPC · JPL
129189	2005 ML_{8}	—	June 27, 2005	Kitt Peak	Spacewatch	·	2.2 km	MPC · JPL
129190	2005 MW_{12}	—	June 29, 2005	Anderson Mesa	LONEOS	·	1.2 km	MPC · JPL
129191	2005 MG_{15}	—	June 29, 2005	Palomar	NEAT	·	1.2 km	MPC · JPL
129192	2005 MQ_{32}	—	June 28, 2005	Palomar	NEAT	·	3.6 km	MPC · JPL
129193	2005 MU_{39}	—	June 29, 2005	Palomar	NEAT	·	1.4 km	MPC · JPL
129194	2005 MS_{40}	—	June 30, 2005	Kitt Peak	Spacewatch	·	5.5 km	MPC · JPL
129195	2005 ML_{46}	—	June 28, 2005	Kitt Peak	Spacewatch	·	2.6 km	MPC · JPL
129196 Mitchbeiser	2005 MV_{52}	Mitchbeiser	June 30, 2005	Catalina	CSS	·	2.1 km	MPC · JPL
129197	2005 NC	—	July 2, 2005	New Mexico Skies	Lowe, A.	EUN	2.0 km	MPC · JPL
129198	2005 NW_{2}	—	July 3, 2005	Socorro	LINEAR	·	2.5 km	MPC · JPL
129199	2005 NK_{7}	—	July 2, 2005	Catalina	CSS	·	2.8 km	MPC · JPL
129200	2005 NC_{9}	—	July 1, 2005	Kitt Peak	Spacewatch	·	3.8 km	MPC · JPL

== 129201–129300 ==
back to top

Designation			Discovery			Properties		Ref
Permanent	Provisional	Named after	Date	Site	Discoverer(s)	Category	Diam.	Ref
129201 Brandenallen	2005 NF_{10}	Brandenallen	July 3, 2005	Mount Lemmon	Mount Lemmon Survey	·	5.6 km	MPC · JPL
129202	2005 NO_{21}	—	July 1, 2005	Kitt Peak	Spacewatch	·	1.1 km	MPC · JPL
129203	2005 NF_{28}	—	July 5, 2005	Palomar	NEAT	·	3.8 km	MPC · JPL
129204	2005 NN_{32}	—	July 5, 2005	Kitt Peak	Spacewatch	·	5.9 km	MPC · JPL
129205	2005 NP_{32}	—	July 5, 2005	Kitt Peak	Spacewatch	·	3.5 km	MPC · JPL
129206	2005 NU_{32}	—	July 5, 2005	Socorro	LINEAR	·	4.1 km	MPC · JPL
129207	2005 ND_{41}	—	July 4, 2005	Mount Lemmon	Mount Lemmon Survey	L4	17 km	MPC · JPL
129208	2005 NO_{56}	—	July 5, 2005	Kitt Peak	Spacewatch	·	2.6 km	MPC · JPL
129209 Robertburt	2005 NP_{60}	Robertburt	July 10, 2005	Catalina	CSS	EOS	3.4 km	MPC · JPL
129210	2005 NZ_{64}	—	July 1, 2005	Kitt Peak	Spacewatch	EOS	3.5 km	MPC · JPL
129211	2005 NC_{66}	—	July 1, 2005	Kitt Peak	Spacewatch	·	2.7 km	MPC · JPL
129212	2005 NA_{69}	—	July 3, 2005	Palomar	NEAT	·	1.8 km	MPC · JPL
129213	2005 NF_{69}	—	July 4, 2005	Kitt Peak	Spacewatch	KOR	2.1 km	MPC · JPL
129214 Gordoncasto	2005 NW_{69}	Gordoncasto	July 4, 2005	Mount Lemmon	Mount Lemmon Survey	·	2.5 km	MPC · JPL
129215	2005 NQ_{79}	—	July 9, 2005	Reedy Creek	J. Broughton	·	7.1 km	MPC · JPL
129216 Chloecastle	2005 NQ_{82}	Chloecastle	July 10, 2005	Catalina	CSS	TIR	3.1 km	MPC · JPL
129217	2005 NB_{85}	—	July 3, 2005	Kitt Peak	Spacewatch	·	3.8 km	MPC · JPL
129218	2005 NP_{96}	—	July 7, 2005	Anderson Mesa	LONEOS	·	2.0 km	MPC · JPL
129219	2005 NO_{99}	—	July 10, 2005	Kitt Peak	Spacewatch	·	3.1 km	MPC · JPL
129220	2005 NK_{102}	—	July 10, 2005	Anderson Mesa	LONEOS	EUP	8.3 km	MPC · JPL
129221	2005 OC_{4}	—	July 26, 2005	Haleakala	NEAT	·	2.7 km	MPC · JPL
129222	2005 OL_{12}	—	July 29, 2005	Palomar	NEAT	·	1.5 km	MPC · JPL
129223	2005 OQ_{14}	—	July 31, 2005	Siding Spring	SSS	·	1.4 km	MPC · JPL
129224	2005 OR_{14}	—	July 31, 2005	Siding Spring	SSS	NYS ·	3.7 km	MPC · JPL
129225	2005 OV_{14}	—	July 31, 2005	Siding Spring	SSS	NYS	2.1 km	MPC · JPL
129226	2005 OX_{19}	—	July 28, 2005	Palomar	NEAT	·	2.7 km	MPC · JPL
129227	2005 OY_{20}	—	July 28, 2005	Palomar	NEAT	·	1.8 km	MPC · JPL
129228	2005 OM_{23}	—	July 30, 2005	Palomar	NEAT	·	3.6 km	MPC · JPL
129229	2005 PB_{1}	—	August 1, 2005	Siding Spring	SSS	·	2.5 km	MPC · JPL
129230	2005 PX_{1}	—	August 1, 2005	Siding Spring	SSS	·	2.5 km	MPC · JPL
129231	2005 PE_{2}	—	August 2, 2005	Socorro	LINEAR	NYS	2.6 km	MPC · JPL
129232	2005 PG_{3}	—	August 2, 2005	Socorro	LINEAR	·	5.8 km	MPC · JPL
129233	2005 PH_{3}	—	August 2, 2005	Socorro	LINEAR	·	6.8 km	MPC · JPL
129234 Silly	2005 PS_{5}	Silly	August 8, 2005	Saint-Sulpice	B. Christophe	·	1.1 km	MPC · JPL
129235	2005 PS_{18}	—	August 15, 2005	Pla D'Arguines	D'Arguines, Pla	·	1.5 km	MPC · JPL
129236	2005 PE_{19}	—	August 2, 2005	Socorro	LINEAR	·	1.2 km	MPC · JPL
129237	2005 PJ_{19}	—	August 4, 2005	Palomar	NEAT	AGN	2.2 km	MPC · JPL
129238	2005 QV	—	August 22, 2005	Palomar	NEAT	·	1.3 km	MPC · JPL
129239	2005 QD_{4}	—	August 24, 2005	Palomar	NEAT	·	3.5 km	MPC · JPL
129240	2005 QK_{5}	—	August 22, 2005	Palomar	NEAT	NYS	2.0 km	MPC · JPL
129241	2005 QS_{13}	—	August 24, 2005	Palomar	NEAT	3:2 · SHU	12 km	MPC · JPL
129242	2005 QB_{14}	—	August 24, 2005	Palomar	NEAT	KOR	2.7 km	MPC · JPL
129243	2005 QQ_{18}	—	August 25, 2005	Palomar	NEAT	·	1.0 km	MPC · JPL
129244	2005 QC_{21}	—	August 26, 2005	Anderson Mesa	LONEOS	MAS	1.4 km	MPC · JPL
129245	2005 QN_{24}	—	August 27, 2005	Kitt Peak	Spacewatch	·	1.8 km	MPC · JPL
129246	2005 QE_{25}	—	August 27, 2005	Kitt Peak	Spacewatch	·	3.2 km	MPC · JPL
129247	2005 QJ_{26}	—	August 27, 2005	Kitt Peak	Spacewatch	·	3.1 km	MPC · JPL
129248	2005 QV_{33}	—	August 25, 2005	Palomar	NEAT	·	880 m	MPC · JPL
129249	2005 QQ_{41}	—	August 26, 2005	Anderson Mesa	LONEOS	·	1.5 km	MPC · JPL
129250	2005 QY_{41}	—	August 26, 2005	Anderson Mesa	LONEOS	·	4.8 km	MPC · JPL
129251	2005 QA_{42}	—	August 26, 2005	Anderson Mesa	LONEOS	·	2.4 km	MPC · JPL
129252	2005 QW_{49}	—	August 26, 2005	Palomar	NEAT	·	5.3 km	MPC · JPL
129253	2005 QP_{66}	—	August 27, 2005	Anderson Mesa	LONEOS	·	3.3 km	MPC · JPL
129254	2005 QU_{66}	—	August 27, 2005	Anderson Mesa	LONEOS	·	8.8 km	MPC · JPL
129255	2005 QC_{69}	—	August 28, 2005	Siding Spring	SSS	EOS	3.8 km	MPC · JPL
129256	2005 QG_{70}	—	August 29, 2005	Socorro	LINEAR	EOS	3.0 km	MPC · JPL
129257	2005 QL_{72}	—	August 29, 2005	Kitt Peak	Spacewatch	·	5.6 km	MPC · JPL
129258	2005 QZ_{74}	—	August 24, 2005	Palomar	NEAT	·	3.9 km	MPC · JPL
129259 Tapolca	2005 QD_{75}	Tapolca	August 25, 2005	Piszkéstető	K. Sárneczky, Szam, D.	SYL · CYB	6.4 km	MPC · JPL
129260	2005 QC_{84}	—	August 29, 2005	Anderson Mesa	LONEOS	·	3.1 km	MPC · JPL
129261	2005 QM_{87}	—	August 31, 2005	Socorro	LINEAR	H	1.1 km	MPC · JPL
129262	2005 QD_{89}	—	August 31, 2005	Socorro	LINEAR	T_{j} (2.99) · EUP	5.7 km	MPC · JPL
129263	2005 QM_{95}	—	August 27, 2005	Palomar	NEAT	·	2.4 km	MPC · JPL
129264	2005 QS_{105}	—	August 27, 2005	Palomar	NEAT	·	5.1 km	MPC · JPL
129265	2005 QG_{110}	—	August 27, 2005	Palomar	NEAT	·	1.3 km	MPC · JPL
129266	2005 QT_{112}	—	August 27, 2005	Palomar	NEAT	PHO	3.7 km	MPC · JPL
129267	2005 QF_{124}	—	August 28, 2005	Kitt Peak	Spacewatch	·	2.4 km	MPC · JPL
129268	2005 QK_{126}	—	August 28, 2005	Kitt Peak	Spacewatch	KOR	2.0 km	MPC · JPL
129269	2005 QG_{145}	—	August 27, 2005	Anderson Mesa	LONEOS	GEF	2.4 km	MPC · JPL
129270	2005 QS_{159}	—	August 28, 2005	Anderson Mesa	LONEOS	V	1.3 km	MPC · JPL
129271	2005 QK_{161}	—	August 28, 2005	Siding Spring	SSS	·	2.0 km	MPC · JPL
129272	2005 QD_{173}	—	August 29, 2005	Palomar	NEAT	V	1.2 km	MPC · JPL
129273	2005 QJ_{173}	—	August 29, 2005	Palomar	NEAT	·	5.9 km	MPC · JPL
129274	2005 QC_{176}	—	August 31, 2005	Palomar	NEAT	NYS	3.4 km	MPC · JPL
129275	2005 RJ_{4}	—	September 4, 2005	Bergisch Gladbach	W. Bickel	·	4.1 km	MPC · JPL
129276	2005 RJ_{8}	—	September 8, 2005	Socorro	LINEAR	·	5.9 km	MPC · JPL
129277 Jianxinchen	2005 RC_{10}	Jianxinchen	September 6, 2005	Catalina	CSS	·	3.0 km	MPC · JPL
129278	2005 RF_{10}	—	September 8, 2005	Socorro	LINEAR	KOR	2.4 km	MPC · JPL
129279	2005 RL_{11}	—	September 10, 2005	Anderson Mesa	LONEOS	·	3.9 km	MPC · JPL
129280	2005 RW_{20}	—	September 1, 2005	Palomar	NEAT	·	2.5 km	MPC · JPL
129281	2005 RP_{21}	—	September 6, 2005	Anderson Mesa	LONEOS	·	4.7 km	MPC · JPL
129282	2005 RN_{31}	—	September 13, 2005	Anderson Mesa	LONEOS	·	8.6 km	MPC · JPL
129283	2005 RC_{33}	—	September 13, 2005	Kitt Peak	Spacewatch	·	1.9 km	MPC · JPL
129284	2005 RX_{33}	—	September 13, 2005	Anderson Mesa	LONEOS	MAR	2.6 km	MPC · JPL
129285	2005 SG_{4}	—	September 24, 2005	Kitt Peak	Spacewatch	·	5.2 km	MPC · JPL
129286	2005 SW_{6}	—	September 23, 2005	Kitt Peak	Spacewatch	NYS	1.5 km	MPC · JPL
129287	2005 SP_{14}	—	September 25, 2005	Kitt Peak	Spacewatch	KOR	2.1 km	MPC · JPL
129288	2005 SO_{18}	—	September 26, 2005	Kitt Peak	Spacewatch	·	4.3 km	MPC · JPL
129289	2005 SE_{41}	—	September 24, 2005	Kitt Peak	Spacewatch	·	1.9 km	MPC · JPL
129290	2005 SQ_{47}	—	September 24, 2005	Kitt Peak	Spacewatch	·	1.7 km	MPC · JPL
129291	2005 SJ_{60}	—	September 26, 2005	Goodricke-Pigott	R. A. Tucker	HYG	5.7 km	MPC · JPL
129292	2005 SD_{70}	—	September 27, 2005	Palomar	NEAT	·	3.4 km	MPC · JPL
129293	2005 SX_{75}	—	September 24, 2005	Kitt Peak	Spacewatch	PAD	2.2 km	MPC · JPL
129294	2005 SX_{105}	—	September 25, 2005	Palomar	NEAT	·	3.5 km	MPC · JPL
129295	2005 SS_{111}	—	September 26, 2005	Kitt Peak	Spacewatch	·	1.8 km	MPC · JPL
129296	2005 SB_{117}	—	September 28, 2005	Palomar	NEAT	HNS	1.9 km	MPC · JPL
129297	2005 SV_{125}	—	September 29, 2005	Palomar	NEAT	V	1.3 km	MPC · JPL
129298	2005 SW_{131}	—	September 29, 2005	Kitt Peak	Spacewatch	THM	4.3 km	MPC · JPL
129299	2005 SU_{148}	—	September 25, 2005	Kitt Peak	Spacewatch	·	3.0 km	MPC · JPL
129300	2005 SY_{151}	—	September 25, 2005	Palomar	NEAT	·	3.8 km	MPC · JPL

== 129301–129400 ==
back to top

Designation			Discovery			Properties		Ref
Permanent	Provisional	Named after	Date	Site	Discoverer(s)	Category	Diam.	Ref
129301	2005 ST_{152}	—	September 25, 2005	Palomar	NEAT	·	1.9 km	MPC · JPL
129302	2005 SE_{161}	—	September 27, 2005	Kitt Peak	Spacewatch	BAP	1.6 km	MPC · JPL
129303	2005 SA_{164}	—	September 27, 2005	Palomar	NEAT	·	5.1 km	MPC · JPL
129304	2005 SL_{164}	—	September 27, 2005	Palomar	NEAT	·	8.3 km	MPC · JPL
129305	2005 SK_{167}	—	September 28, 2005	Palomar	NEAT	·	2.1 km	MPC · JPL
129306	2005 SX_{186}	—	September 29, 2005	Palomar	NEAT	NYS	2.2 km	MPC · JPL
129307 Tomconnors	2005 SL_{190}	Tomconnors	September 29, 2005	Catalina	CSS	EUN	2.9 km	MPC · JPL
129308	2005 SB_{193}	—	September 29, 2005	Kitt Peak	Spacewatch	·	6.6 km	MPC · JPL
129309	2005 SJ_{194}	—	September 29, 2005	Kitt Peak	Spacewatch	·	1.4 km	MPC · JPL
129310	2005 SC_{202}	—	September 30, 2005	Palomar	NEAT	·	3.0 km	MPC · JPL
129311	2005 SP_{203}	—	September 30, 2005	Palomar	NEAT	·	2.3 km	MPC · JPL
129312 Drouetdaubigny	2005 SH_{214}	Drouetdaubigny	September 30, 2005	Catalina	CSS	·	7.3 km	MPC · JPL
129313	2005 SA_{218}	—	September 30, 2005	Palomar	NEAT	V	1.1 km	MPC · JPL
129314 Dathongolish	2005 SM_{220}	Dathongolish	September 29, 2005	Catalina	CSS	EUP	6.9 km	MPC · JPL
129315	2005 SS_{257}	—	September 18, 2005	Palomar	NEAT	(5651)	6.5 km	MPC · JPL
129316	2005 TY_{14}	—	October 3, 2005	Palomar	NEAT	·	8.7 km	MPC · JPL
129317	2005 TM_{18}	—	October 1, 2005	Socorro	LINEAR	NYS	1.9 km	MPC · JPL
129318 Sarahschlieder	2005 TC_{23}	Sarahschlieder	October 1, 2005	Mount Lemmon	Mount Lemmon Survey	AST	2.8 km	MPC · JPL
129319	2005 TE_{23}	—	October 1, 2005	Socorro	LINEAR	·	3.5 km	MPC · JPL
129320	2005 TV_{23}	—	October 1, 2005	Anderson Mesa	LONEOS	·	3.4 km	MPC · JPL
129321 Tannercampbell	2005 TS_{24}	Tannercampbell	October 1, 2005	Mount Lemmon	Mount Lemmon Survey	·	1.1 km	MPC · JPL
129322	2005 TN_{45}	—	October 6, 2005	Anderson Mesa	LONEOS	·	2.6 km	MPC · JPL
129323	2005 TQ_{47}	—	October 5, 2005	Kitt Peak	Spacewatch	·	3.0 km	MPC · JPL
129324 Johnweirich	2005 TH_{72}	Johnweirich	October 4, 2005	Mount Lemmon	Mount Lemmon Survey	NYS	1.6 km	MPC · JPL
129325 Jedhancock	2005 TW_{72}	Jedhancock	October 5, 2005	Catalina	CSS	·	8.0 km	MPC · JPL
129326	2005 TJ_{83}	—	October 3, 2005	Socorro	LINEAR	·	3.1 km	MPC · JPL
129327 Davehamara	2005 TG_{134}	Davehamara	October 10, 2005	Catalina	CSS	·	4.4 km	MPC · JPL
129328 Loriharrison	2005 TZ_{171}	Loriharrison	October 10, 2005	Catalina	CSS	·	3.1 km	MPC · JPL
129329	2005 TW_{172}	—	October 13, 2005	Socorro	LINEAR	·	1.1 km	MPC · JPL
129330 Karlharshman	2005 UH_{18}	Karlharshman	October 22, 2005	Catalina	CSS	·	3.9 km	MPC · JPL
129331	2005 UZ_{25}	—	October 23, 2005	Kitt Peak	Spacewatch	NYS	2.4 km	MPC · JPL
129332 Markhunten	2005 UJ_{50}	Markhunten	October 23, 2005	Catalina	CSS	·	3.5 km	MPC · JPL
129333 Ashleylancaster	2005 UR_{55}	Ashleylancaster	October 23, 2005	Catalina	CSS	THM	5.9 km	MPC · JPL
129334	2005 UN_{68}	—	October 22, 2005	Palomar	NEAT	V	870 m	MPC · JPL
129335 Edwardlittle	2005 UM_{70}	Edwardlittle	October 23, 2005	Catalina	CSS	·	1.3 km	MPC · JPL
129336	2005 UC_{73}	—	October 23, 2005	Palomar	NEAT	·	3.5 km	MPC · JPL
129337	2005 UE_{74}	—	October 23, 2005	Palomar	NEAT	·	1.2 km	MPC · JPL
129338 Andrewlowman	2005 UZ_{74}	Andrewlowman	October 23, 2005	Catalina	CSS	·	4.1 km	MPC · JPL
129339	2005 UT_{109}	—	October 22, 2005	Kitt Peak	Spacewatch	·	2.2 km	MPC · JPL
129340	2005 UR_{119}	—	October 24, 2005	Kitt Peak	Spacewatch	·	3.4 km	MPC · JPL
129341	2005 UR_{131}	—	October 24, 2005	Palomar	NEAT	·	4.7 km	MPC · JPL
129342 Ependes	2005 VA_{4}	Ependes	November 5, 2005	Marly	P. Kocher	·	2.8 km	MPC · JPL
129343	2063 P-L	—	September 24, 1960	Palomar	C. J. van Houten, I. van Houten-Groeneveld, T. Gehrels	·	2.2 km	MPC · JPL
129344	2094 P-L	—	September 24, 1960	Palomar	C. J. van Houten, I. van Houten-Groeneveld, T. Gehrels	·	1.2 km	MPC · JPL
129345	2116 P-L	—	September 26, 1960	Palomar	C. J. van Houten, I. van Houten-Groeneveld, T. Gehrels	·	3.3 km	MPC · JPL
129346	2222 P-L	—	September 24, 1960	Palomar	C. J. van Houten, I. van Houten-Groeneveld, T. Gehrels	·	2.3 km	MPC · JPL
129347	2234 P-L	—	October 17, 1960	Palomar	C. J. van Houten, I. van Houten-Groeneveld, T. Gehrels	·	1.1 km	MPC · JPL
129348	2513 P-L	—	September 24, 1960	Palomar	C. J. van Houten, I. van Houten-Groeneveld, T. Gehrels	·	4.5 km	MPC · JPL
129349	2514 P-L	—	September 24, 1960	Palomar	C. J. van Houten, I. van Houten-Groeneveld, T. Gehrels	·	2.5 km	MPC · JPL
129350	2515 P-L	—	September 24, 1960	Palomar	C. J. van Houten, I. van Houten-Groeneveld, T. Gehrels	V	1.2 km	MPC · JPL
129351	2652 P-L	—	September 24, 1960	Palomar	C. J. van Houten, I. van Houten-Groeneveld, T. Gehrels	·	3.5 km	MPC · JPL
129352	2664 P-L	—	September 24, 1960	Palomar	C. J. van Houten, I. van Houten-Groeneveld, T. Gehrels	·	3.7 km	MPC · JPL
129353	2719 P-L	—	September 24, 1960	Palomar	C. J. van Houten, I. van Houten-Groeneveld, T. Gehrels	·	3.6 km	MPC · JPL
129354	2747 P-L	—	September 24, 1960	Palomar	C. J. van Houten, I. van Houten-Groeneveld, T. Gehrels	·	2.0 km	MPC · JPL
129355	3004 P-L	—	September 24, 1960	Palomar	C. J. van Houten, I. van Houten-Groeneveld, T. Gehrels	EUN	3.6 km	MPC · JPL
129356	3067 P-L	—	September 25, 1960	Palomar	C. J. van Houten, I. van Houten-Groeneveld, T. Gehrels	·	2.1 km	MPC · JPL
129357	3099 P-L	—	September 24, 1960	Palomar	C. J. van Houten, I. van Houten-Groeneveld, T. Gehrels	·	4.8 km	MPC · JPL
129358	3105 P-L	—	September 24, 1960	Palomar	C. J. van Houten, I. van Houten-Groeneveld, T. Gehrels	·	5.3 km	MPC · JPL
129359	4209 P-L	—	September 24, 1960	Palomar	C. J. van Houten, I. van Houten-Groeneveld, T. Gehrels	·	5.0 km	MPC · JPL
129360	4263 P-L	—	September 24, 1960	Palomar	C. J. van Houten, I. van Houten-Groeneveld, T. Gehrels	EOS	3.6 km	MPC · JPL
129361	4324 P-L	—	September 24, 1960	Palomar	C. J. van Houten, I. van Houten-Groeneveld, T. Gehrels	ADE	5.2 km	MPC · JPL
129362	4327 P-L	—	September 24, 1960	Palomar	C. J. van Houten, I. van Houten-Groeneveld, T. Gehrels	·	7.1 km	MPC · JPL
129363	4330 P-L	—	September 24, 1960	Palomar	C. J. van Houten, I. van Houten-Groeneveld, T. Gehrels	·	1.7 km	MPC · JPL
129364	4719 P-L	—	September 24, 1960	Palomar	C. J. van Houten, I. van Houten-Groeneveld, T. Gehrels	MAS	940 m	MPC · JPL
129365	4751 P-L	—	September 24, 1960	Palomar	C. J. van Houten, I. van Houten-Groeneveld, T. Gehrels	NYS	1.7 km	MPC · JPL
129366	4752 P-L	—	September 24, 1960	Palomar	C. J. van Houten, I. van Houten-Groeneveld, T. Gehrels	·	2.4 km	MPC · JPL
129367	4795 P-L	—	September 24, 1960	Palomar	C. J. van Houten, I. van Houten-Groeneveld, T. Gehrels	·	3.0 km	MPC · JPL
129368	4823 P-L	—	September 24, 1960	Palomar	C. J. van Houten, I. van Houten-Groeneveld, T. Gehrels	THM	4.3 km	MPC · JPL
129369	4909 P-L	—	September 24, 1960	Palomar	C. J. van Houten, I. van Houten-Groeneveld, T. Gehrels	MAS	940 m	MPC · JPL
129370	6258 P-L	—	September 24, 1960	Palomar	C. J. van Houten, I. van Houten-Groeneveld, T. Gehrels	HYG	5.2 km	MPC · JPL
129371	6266 P-L	—	September 24, 1960	Palomar	C. J. van Houten, I. van Houten-Groeneveld, T. Gehrels	·	2.1 km	MPC · JPL
129372	6291 P-L	—	September 24, 1960	Palomar	C. J. van Houten, I. van Houten-Groeneveld, T. Gehrels	·	1.5 km	MPC · JPL
129373	6318 P-L	—	September 24, 1960	Palomar	C. J. van Houten, I. van Houten-Groeneveld, T. Gehrels	·	3.8 km	MPC · JPL
129374	6340 P-L	—	September 24, 1960	Palomar	C. J. van Houten, I. van Houten-Groeneveld, T. Gehrels	PAD	2.6 km	MPC · JPL
129375	6350 P-L	—	September 24, 1960	Palomar	C. J. van Houten, I. van Houten-Groeneveld, T. Gehrels	·	1.4 km	MPC · JPL
129376	6357 P-L	—	September 24, 1960	Palomar	C. J. van Houten, I. van Houten-Groeneveld, T. Gehrels	·	4.3 km	MPC · JPL
129377	6716 P-L	—	September 24, 1960	Palomar	C. J. van Houten, I. van Houten-Groeneveld, T. Gehrels	·	5.5 km	MPC · JPL
129378	6729 P-L	—	September 24, 1960	Palomar	C. J. van Houten, I. van Houten-Groeneveld, T. Gehrels	·	5.8 km	MPC · JPL
129379	6799 P-L	—	September 24, 1960	Palomar	C. J. van Houten, I. van Houten-Groeneveld, T. Gehrels	·	3.1 km	MPC · JPL
129380	6839 P-L	—	September 24, 1960	Palomar	C. J. van Houten, I. van Houten-Groeneveld, T. Gehrels	·	2.2 km	MPC · JPL
129381	6850 P-L	—	September 24, 1960	Palomar	C. J. van Houten, I. van Houten-Groeneveld, T. Gehrels	KOR	2.4 km	MPC · JPL
129382	6852 P-L	—	September 24, 1960	Palomar	C. J. van Houten, I. van Houten-Groeneveld, T. Gehrels	·	3.8 km	MPC · JPL
129383	7623 P-L	—	October 22, 1960	Palomar	C. J. van Houten, I. van Houten-Groeneveld, T. Gehrels	NYS	2.2 km	MPC · JPL
129384	1218 T-1	—	March 25, 1971	Palomar	C. J. van Houten, I. van Houten-Groeneveld, T. Gehrels	·	1.2 km	MPC · JPL
129385	4041 T-1	—	March 26, 1971	Palomar	C. J. van Houten, I. van Houten-Groeneveld, T. Gehrels	·	2.9 km	MPC · JPL
129386	1027 T-2	—	September 29, 1973	Palomar	C. J. van Houten, I. van Houten-Groeneveld, T. Gehrels	·	5.4 km	MPC · JPL
129387	1129 T-2	—	September 29, 1973	Palomar	C. J. van Houten, I. van Houten-Groeneveld, T. Gehrels	·	4.7 km	MPC · JPL
129388	1149 T-2	—	September 29, 1973	Palomar	C. J. van Houten, I. van Houten-Groeneveld, T. Gehrels	·	1.3 km	MPC · JPL
129389	1285 T-2	—	September 29, 1973	Palomar	C. J. van Houten, I. van Houten-Groeneveld, T. Gehrels	·	1.8 km	MPC · JPL
129390	1291 T-2	—	September 29, 1973	Palomar	C. J. van Houten, I. van Houten-Groeneveld, T. Gehrels	·	3.2 km	MPC · JPL
129391	1319 T-2	—	September 29, 1973	Palomar	C. J. van Houten, I. van Houten-Groeneveld, T. Gehrels	·	1.6 km	MPC · JPL
129392	1339 T-2	—	September 29, 1973	Palomar	C. J. van Houten, I. van Houten-Groeneveld, T. Gehrels	·	3.5 km	MPC · JPL
129393	1362 T-2	—	September 29, 1973	Palomar	C. J. van Houten, I. van Houten-Groeneveld, T. Gehrels	·	1.6 km	MPC · JPL
129394	1402 T-2	—	September 29, 1973	Palomar	C. J. van Houten, I. van Houten-Groeneveld, T. Gehrels	·	1.8 km	MPC · JPL
129395	1421 T-2	—	September 29, 1973	Palomar	C. J. van Houten, I. van Houten-Groeneveld, T. Gehrels	·	1.0 km	MPC · JPL
129396	1424 T-2	—	September 29, 1973	Palomar	C. J. van Houten, I. van Houten-Groeneveld, T. Gehrels	·	2.4 km	MPC · JPL
129397	1508 T-2	—	September 29, 1973	Palomar	C. J. van Houten, I. van Houten-Groeneveld, T. Gehrels	·	1.9 km	MPC · JPL
129398	2109 T-2	—	September 29, 1973	Palomar	C. J. van Houten, I. van Houten-Groeneveld, T. Gehrels	·	1.6 km	MPC · JPL
129399	2186 T-2	—	September 29, 1973	Palomar	C. J. van Houten, I. van Houten-Groeneveld, T. Gehrels	KOR	2.9 km	MPC · JPL
129400	2321 T-2	—	September 29, 1973	Palomar	C. J. van Houten, I. van Houten-Groeneveld, T. Gehrels	·	880 m	MPC · JPL

== 129401–129500 ==
back to top

Designation			Discovery			Properties		Ref
Permanent	Provisional	Named after	Date	Site	Discoverer(s)	Category	Diam.	Ref
129401	3098 T-2	—	September 30, 1973	Palomar	C. J. van Houten, I. van Houten-Groeneveld, T. Gehrels	·	1.3 km	MPC · JPL
129402	4093 T-2	—	September 29, 1973	Palomar	C. J. van Houten, I. van Houten-Groeneveld, T. Gehrels	·	2.4 km	MPC · JPL
129403	4185 T-2	—	September 29, 1973	Palomar	C. J. van Houten, I. van Houten-Groeneveld, T. Gehrels	·	3.7 km	MPC · JPL
129404	5021 T-2	—	September 25, 1973	Palomar	C. J. van Houten, I. van Houten-Groeneveld, T. Gehrels	·	5.1 km	MPC · JPL
129405	5046 T-2	—	September 25, 1973	Palomar	C. J. van Houten, I. van Houten-Groeneveld, T. Gehrels	·	5.0 km	MPC · JPL
129406	5092 T-2	—	September 25, 1973	Palomar	C. J. van Houten, I. van Houten-Groeneveld, T. Gehrels	·	1.3 km	MPC · JPL
129407	5177 T-2	—	September 25, 1973	Palomar	C. J. van Houten, I. van Houten-Groeneveld, T. Gehrels	EOS	3.1 km	MPC · JPL
129408	1045 T-3	—	October 17, 1977	Palomar	C. J. van Houten, I. van Houten-Groeneveld, T. Gehrels	·	5.4 km	MPC · JPL
129409	2033 T-3	—	October 16, 1977	Palomar	C. J. van Houten, I. van Houten-Groeneveld, T. Gehrels	·	1.3 km	MPC · JPL
129410	2150 T-3	—	October 16, 1977	Palomar	C. J. van Houten, I. van Houten-Groeneveld, T. Gehrels	EOS	3.2 km	MPC · JPL
129411	2154 T-3	—	October 16, 1977	Palomar	C. J. van Houten, I. van Houten-Groeneveld, T. Gehrels	·	1.1 km	MPC · JPL
129412	2160 T-3	—	October 16, 1977	Palomar	C. J. van Houten, I. van Houten-Groeneveld, T. Gehrels	HYG	5.2 km	MPC · JPL
129413	2226 T-3	—	October 16, 1977	Palomar	C. J. van Houten, I. van Houten-Groeneveld, T. Gehrels	·	2.0 km	MPC · JPL
129414	2231 T-3	—	October 16, 1977	Palomar	C. J. van Houten, I. van Houten-Groeneveld, T. Gehrels	NYS	2.3 km	MPC · JPL
129415	2277 T-3	—	October 16, 1977	Palomar	C. J. van Houten, I. van Houten-Groeneveld, T. Gehrels	·	1.2 km	MPC · JPL
129416	2291 T-3	—	October 16, 1977	Palomar	C. J. van Houten, I. van Houten-Groeneveld, T. Gehrels	V	890 m	MPC · JPL
129417	2613 T-3	—	October 16, 1977	Palomar	C. J. van Houten, I. van Houten-Groeneveld, T. Gehrels	PAD	4.0 km	MPC · JPL
129418	2617 T-3	—	October 16, 1977	Palomar	C. J. van Houten, I. van Houten-Groeneveld, T. Gehrels	HYG	3.9 km	MPC · JPL
129419	2619 T-3	—	October 16, 1977	Palomar	C. J. van Houten, I. van Houten-Groeneveld, T. Gehrels	fast	6.6 km	MPC · JPL
129420	3114 T-3	—	October 16, 1977	Palomar	C. J. van Houten, I. van Houten-Groeneveld, T. Gehrels	THM · fast	6.0 km	MPC · JPL
129421	3147 T-3	—	October 16, 1977	Palomar	C. J. van Houten, I. van Houten-Groeneveld, T. Gehrels	·	3.5 km	MPC · JPL
129422	3223 T-3	—	October 16, 1977	Palomar	C. J. van Houten, I. van Houten-Groeneveld, T. Gehrels	·	3.0 km	MPC · JPL
129423	3379 T-3	—	October 16, 1977	Palomar	C. J. van Houten, I. van Houten-Groeneveld, T. Gehrels	·	2.1 km	MPC · JPL
129424	3415 T-3	—	October 16, 1977	Palomar	C. J. van Houten, I. van Houten-Groeneveld, T. Gehrels	·	5.2 km	MPC · JPL
129425	3497 T-3	—	October 16, 1977	Palomar	C. J. van Houten, I. van Houten-Groeneveld, T. Gehrels	·	2.1 km	MPC · JPL
129426	3516 T-3	—	October 16, 1977	Palomar	C. J. van Houten, I. van Houten-Groeneveld, T. Gehrels	·	2.8 km	MPC · JPL
129427	4123 T-3	—	October 16, 1977	Palomar	C. J. van Houten, I. van Houten-Groeneveld, T. Gehrels	·	5.8 km	MPC · JPL
129428	4164 T-3	—	October 16, 1977	Palomar	C. J. van Houten, I. van Houten-Groeneveld, T. Gehrels	·	2.7 km	MPC · JPL
129429	4289 T-3	—	October 16, 1977	Palomar	C. J. van Houten, I. van Houten-Groeneveld, T. Gehrels	·	5.9 km	MPC · JPL
129430	4305 T-3	—	October 16, 1977	Palomar	C. J. van Houten, I. van Houten-Groeneveld, T. Gehrels	TIR	3.9 km	MPC · JPL
129431	4355 T-3	—	October 16, 1977	Palomar	C. J. van Houten, I. van Houten-Groeneveld, T. Gehrels	·	1.6 km	MPC · JPL
129432	4506 T-3	—	October 16, 1977	Palomar	C. J. van Houten, I. van Houten-Groeneveld, T. Gehrels	GEF	2.5 km	MPC · JPL
129433	4608 T-3	—	October 16, 1977	Palomar	C. J. van Houten, I. van Houten-Groeneveld, T. Gehrels	·	2.7 km	MPC · JPL
129434	5013 T-3	—	October 16, 1977	Palomar	C. J. van Houten, I. van Houten-Groeneveld, T. Gehrels	PAD	2.8 km	MPC · JPL
129435	5017 T-3	—	October 16, 1977	Palomar	C. J. van Houten, I. van Houten-Groeneveld, T. Gehrels	·	2.2 km	MPC · JPL
129436	5039 T-3	—	October 16, 1977	Palomar	C. J. van Houten, I. van Houten-Groeneveld, T. Gehrels	·	6.4 km	MPC · JPL
129437	1978 NG	—	July 10, 1978	Palomar	E. F. Helin, E. M. Shoemaker	·	3.3 km	MPC · JPL
129438	1979 MO_{3}	—	June 25, 1979	Siding Spring	E. F. Helin, S. J. Bus	·	3.2 km	MPC · JPL
129439	1980 PX_{2}	—	August 4, 1980	Siding Spring	Royal Observatory Edinburgh	·	6.3 km	MPC · JPL
129440	1981 DC_{1}	—	February 28, 1981	Siding Spring	S. J. Bus	·	2.5 km	MPC · JPL
129441	1981 DJ_{3}	—	February 28, 1981	Siding Spring	S. J. Bus	DOR	4.5 km	MPC · JPL
129442	1981 EC_{15}	—	March 1, 1981	Siding Spring	S. J. Bus	·	2.1 km	MPC · JPL
129443	1981 EP_{21}	—	March 2, 1981	Siding Spring	S. J. Bus	·	2.3 km	MPC · JPL
129444	1981 EN_{23}	—	March 3, 1981	Siding Spring	S. J. Bus	·	1.4 km	MPC · JPL
129445	1981 EA_{24}	—	March 7, 1981	Siding Spring	S. J. Bus	·	3.0 km	MPC · JPL
129446	1981 EB_{30}	—	March 2, 1981	Siding Spring	S. J. Bus	·	4.7 km	MPC · JPL
129447	1981 EP_{33}	—	March 1, 1981	Siding Spring	S. J. Bus	V	920 m	MPC · JPL
129448	1989 SX_{1}	—	September 26, 1989	La Silla	E. W. Elst	ERI	2.9 km	MPC · JPL
129449	1990 WE_{1}	—	November 18, 1990	La Silla	E. W. Elst	·	4.0 km	MPC · JPL
129450	1991 JM	—	May 5, 1991	Kitt Peak	Spacewatch	H	1.1 km	MPC · JPL
129451	1991 KD	—	May 18, 1991	Palomar	C. S. Shoemaker	·	3.1 km	MPC · JPL
129452 Ashleydawn	1991 TJ_{16}	Ashleydawn	October 6, 1991	Palomar	Lowe, A.	·	4.6 km	MPC · JPL
129453 Madeleinenettie	1991 TO_{16}	Madeleinenettie	October 6, 1991	Palomar	Lowe, A.	MAR	1.7 km	MPC · JPL
129454	1991 UQ_{2}	—	October 31, 1991	Kitami	A. Takahashi, K. Watanabe	·	6.1 km	MPC · JPL
129455	1992 BR_{2}	—	January 30, 1992	La Silla	E. W. Elst	·	2.8 km	MPC · JPL
129456	1992 DR_{7}	—	February 29, 1992	La Silla	UESAC	·	1.2 km	MPC · JPL
129457	1992 EH_{5}	—	March 1, 1992	La Silla	UESAC	·	1.7 km	MPC · JPL
129458	1992 EQ_{6}	—	March 1, 1992	La Silla	UESAC	·	1.7 km	MPC · JPL
129459	1992 ED_{10}	—	March 2, 1992	La Silla	UESAC	DOR	5.5 km	MPC · JPL
129460	1992 PW_{2}	—	August 6, 1992	Palomar	H. E. Holt	·	3.6 km	MPC · JPL
129461	1993 FJ_{5}	—	March 17, 1993	La Silla	UESAC	·	2.7 km	MPC · JPL
129462	1993 FU_{9}	—	March 17, 1993	La Silla	UESAC	JUN	2.0 km	MPC · JPL
129463	1993 FA_{10}	—	March 17, 1993	La Silla	UESAC	·	1.6 km	MPC · JPL
129464	1993 FF_{23}	—	March 21, 1993	La Silla	UESAC	·	1.3 km	MPC · JPL
129465	1993 FC_{41}	—	March 19, 1993	La Silla	UESAC	·	4.7 km	MPC · JPL
129466	1993 FM_{44}	—	March 19, 1993	La Silla	UESAC	·	2.4 km	MPC · JPL
129467	1993 FM_{47}	—	March 19, 1993	La Silla	UESAC	·	3.6 km	MPC · JPL
129468	1993 FZ_{52}	—	March 17, 1993	La Silla	UESAC	·	1.1 km	MPC · JPL
129469	1993 FU_{69}	—	March 21, 1993	La Silla	UESAC	·	2.6 km	MPC · JPL
129470	1993 KC	—	May 20, 1993	Kitt Peak	Spacewatch	·	1.7 km	MPC · JPL
129471	1993 OL_{8}	—	July 20, 1993	La Silla	E. W. Elst	·	4.0 km	MPC · JPL
129472	1993 PS_{5}	—	August 15, 1993	Caussols	E. W. Elst	·	3.6 km	MPC · JPL
129473	1993 TK	—	October 10, 1993	Stroncone	A. Vagnozzi	ERI	2.4 km	MPC · JPL
129474	1993 TF_{16}	—	October 9, 1993	La Silla	E. W. Elst	·	3.6 km	MPC · JPL
129475	1993 TK_{16}	—	October 9, 1993	La Silla	E. W. Elst	·	950 m	MPC · JPL
129476	1993 TN_{20}	—	October 9, 1993	La Silla	E. W. Elst	·	1.9 km	MPC · JPL
129477	1993 TB_{26}	—	October 9, 1993	La Silla	E. W. Elst	·	4.2 km	MPC · JPL
129478	1993 TU_{27}	—	October 9, 1993	La Silla	E. W. Elst	·	2.8 km	MPC · JPL
129479	1993 TO_{41}	—	October 9, 1993	La Silla	E. W. Elst	KOR	2.7 km	MPC · JPL
129480	1993 UQ_{8}	—	October 20, 1993	La Silla	E. W. Elst	·	3.4 km	MPC · JPL
129481	1994 CL_{15}	—	February 8, 1994	La Silla	E. W. Elst	·	3.8 km	MPC · JPL
129482	1994 GL_{4}	—	April 6, 1994	Kitt Peak	Spacewatch	VER	5.2 km	MPC · JPL
129483	1994 GO_{8}	—	April 15, 1994	Kitt Peak	Spacewatch	EUN	2.5 km	MPC · JPL
129484	1994 PG_{15}	—	August 10, 1994	La Silla	E. W. Elst	·	2.4 km	MPC · JPL
129485	1994 PM_{30}	—	August 12, 1994	La Silla	E. W. Elst	·	1.7 km	MPC · JPL
129486	1994 PN_{30}	—	August 12, 1994	La Silla	E. W. Elst	·	2.2 km	MPC · JPL
129487	1994 RX_{14}	—	September 3, 1994	La Silla	E. W. Elst	·	2.5 km	MPC · JPL
129488	1994 SW_{2}	—	September 28, 1994	Kitt Peak	Spacewatch	DOR	5.4 km	MPC · JPL
129489	1994 TN_{5}	—	October 4, 1994	Kitt Peak	Spacewatch	AGN	2.2 km	MPC · JPL
129490	1994 TP_{10}	—	October 9, 1994	Kitt Peak	Spacewatch	·	4.3 km	MPC · JPL
129491	1994 TA_{12}	—	October 10, 1994	Kitt Peak	Spacewatch	ADE	5.4 km	MPC · JPL
129492	1994 TF_{13}	—	October 11, 1994	Kitt Peak	Spacewatch	·	3.5 km	MPC · JPL
129493	1995 BM_{2}	—	January 29, 1995	Siding Spring	R. H. McNaught	·	2.6 km	MPC · JPL
129494	1995 BB_{15}	—	January 31, 1995	Kitt Peak	Spacewatch	·	1.7 km	MPC · JPL
129495	1995 DP_{6}	—	February 24, 1995	Kitt Peak	Spacewatch	NYS	1.3 km	MPC · JPL
129496	1995 EK	—	March 5, 1995	Oizumi	T. Kobayashi	·	3.3 km	MPC · JPL
129497	1995 FA_{3}	—	March 23, 1995	Kitt Peak	Spacewatch	·	2.5 km	MPC · JPL
129498	1995 FF_{4}	—	March 23, 1995	Kitt Peak	Spacewatch	ANF	2.1 km	MPC · JPL
129499	1995 FG_{6}	—	March 23, 1995	Kitt Peak	Spacewatch	·	1.8 km	MPC · JPL
129500	1995 GW_{2}	—	April 2, 1995	Kitt Peak	Spacewatch	·	4.5 km	MPC · JPL

== 129501–129600 ==
back to top

Designation			Discovery			Properties		Ref
Permanent	Provisional	Named after	Date	Site	Discoverer(s)	Category	Diam.	Ref
129501	1995 HJ_{5}	—	April 28, 1995	Kitt Peak	Spacewatch	·	2.3 km	MPC · JPL
129502	1995 MT_{6}	—	June 29, 1995	Kitt Peak	Spacewatch	VER	4.4 km	MPC · JPL
129503	1995 OZ_{1}	—	July 24, 1995	Church Stretton	S. P. Laurie	·	1.9 km	MPC · JPL
129504	1995 SU_{8}	—	September 17, 1995	Kitt Peak	Spacewatch	·	1.7 km	MPC · JPL
129505	1995 SE_{24}	—	September 19, 1995	Kitt Peak	Spacewatch	·	2.2 km	MPC · JPL
129506	1995 SJ_{32}	—	September 21, 1995	Kitt Peak	Spacewatch	·	1.7 km	MPC · JPL
129507	1995 SU_{45}	—	September 26, 1995	Kitt Peak	Spacewatch	MIS	3.9 km	MPC · JPL
129508	1995 SO_{52}	—	September 29, 1995	Kitt Peak	Spacewatch	·	1.7 km	MPC · JPL
129509	1995 ST_{52}	—	September 29, 1995	Kitt Peak	Spacewatch	·	1.9 km	MPC · JPL
129510	1995 SQ_{85}	—	September 25, 1995	Kitt Peak	Spacewatch	·	2.2 km	MPC · JPL
129511	1995 TN_{7}	—	October 15, 1995	Kitt Peak	Spacewatch	·	2.1 km	MPC · JPL
129512	1995 UZ_{1}	—	October 21, 1995	Ondřejov	P. Pravec	·	2.4 km	MPC · JPL
129513	1995 UD_{10}	—	October 16, 1995	Kitt Peak	Spacewatch	·	2.2 km	MPC · JPL
129514	1995 UJ_{13}	—	October 17, 1995	Kitt Peak	Spacewatch	·	1.2 km	MPC · JPL
129515	1995 UX_{17}	—	October 18, 1995	Kitt Peak	Spacewatch	·	2.1 km	MPC · JPL
129516	1995 UR_{22}	—	October 19, 1995	Kitt Peak	Spacewatch	MAR	1.7 km	MPC · JPL
129517	1995 UM_{31}	—	October 21, 1995	Kitt Peak	Spacewatch	MAR	2.8 km	MPC · JPL
129518	1995 VU_{11}	—	November 15, 1995	Kitt Peak	Spacewatch	·	3.8 km	MPC · JPL
129519	1995 VG_{16}	—	November 15, 1995	Kitt Peak	Spacewatch	·	4.9 km	MPC · JPL
129520	1995 WP_{3}	—	November 21, 1995	Farra d'Isonzo	Farra d'Isonzo	·	2.1 km	MPC · JPL
129521	1995 WH_{40}	—	November 23, 1995	Kitt Peak	Spacewatch	·	2.2 km	MPC · JPL
129522	1995 XY_{3}	—	December 14, 1995	Kitt Peak	Spacewatch	·	2.1 km	MPC · JPL
129523	1995 XY_{4}	—	December 14, 1995	Kitt Peak	Spacewatch	·	1.9 km	MPC · JPL
129524	1995 YK_{8}	—	December 18, 1995	Kitt Peak	Spacewatch	·	1.2 km	MPC · JPL
129525	1996 AG_{11}	—	January 13, 1996	Kitt Peak	Spacewatch	·	1.2 km	MPC · JPL
129526	1996 AZ_{11}	—	January 14, 1996	Kitt Peak	Spacewatch	WIT	1.3 km	MPC · JPL
129527	1996 AJ_{14}	—	January 12, 1996	Kitt Peak	Spacewatch	·	3.7 km	MPC · JPL
129528	1996 BQ_{8}	—	January 19, 1996	Kitt Peak	Spacewatch	·	3.7 km	MPC · JPL
129529	1996 EM_{7}	—	March 11, 1996	Kitt Peak	Spacewatch	KOR	2.1 km	MPC · JPL
129530	1996 EB_{9}	—	March 12, 1996	Kitt Peak	Spacewatch	·	3.5 km	MPC · JPL
129531	1996 EX_{9}	—	March 12, 1996	Kitt Peak	Spacewatch	·	3.6 km	MPC · JPL
129532	1996 EO_{13}	—	March 11, 1996	Kitt Peak	Spacewatch	·	1.1 km	MPC · JPL
129533	1996 EN_{14}	—	March 12, 1996	Kitt Peak	Spacewatch	KOR	1.8 km	MPC · JPL
129534	1996 HA_{5}	—	April 19, 1996	Kitt Peak	Spacewatch	BRA	3.0 km	MPC · JPL
129535	1996 HH_{7}	—	April 19, 1996	Kitt Peak	Spacewatch	·	4.7 km	MPC · JPL
129536	1996 JQ_{6}	—	May 11, 1996	Kitt Peak	Spacewatch	·	3.6 km	MPC · JPL
129537	1996 KA_{2}	—	May 16, 1996	Kitt Peak	Spacewatch	·	1.5 km	MPC · JPL
129538	1996 NM	—	July 14, 1996	Haleakala	NEAT	·	5.0 km	MPC · JPL
129539	1996 NO_{1}	—	July 15, 1996	Lime Creek	R. Linderholm	·	1.5 km	MPC · JPL
129540	1996 PU_{2}	—	August 13, 1996	Haleakala	NEAT	·	1.2 km	MPC · JPL
129541	1996 PQ_{9}	—	August 9, 1996	Nanyo	T. Okuni	·	3.1 km	MPC · JPL
129542	1996 RK_{5}	—	September 15, 1996	Church Stretton	S. P. Laurie	·	9.1 km	MPC · JPL
129543	1996 RU_{5}	—	September 14, 1996	Stroncone	A. Vagnozzi	·	1.6 km	MPC · JPL
129544	1996 RE_{24}	—	September 7, 1996	Nanyo	T. Okuni	ERI	3.6 km	MPC · JPL
129545	1996 SE_{3}	—	September 20, 1996	Kitt Peak	Spacewatch	·	2.2 km	MPC · JPL
129546	1996 TZ_{1}	—	October 3, 1996	Xinglong	SCAP	H	1.1 km	MPC · JPL
129547	1996 TC_{6}	—	October 3, 1996	Xinglong	SCAP	·	2.2 km	MPC · JPL
129548	1996 TC_{7}	—	October 11, 1996	Prescott	P. G. Comba	·	1.3 km	MPC · JPL
129549	1996 TG_{9}	—	October 12, 1996	Kitt Peak	Spacewatch	·	2.0 km	MPC · JPL
129550 Fukuten	1996 TN_{14}	Fukuten	October 9, 1996	Nanyo	T. Okuni	·	2.7 km	MPC · JPL
129551	1996 TQ_{19}	—	October 5, 1996	Kitt Peak	Spacewatch	·	5.4 km	MPC · JPL
129552	1996 TH_{30}	—	October 7, 1996	Kitt Peak	Spacewatch	MAS	1.1 km	MPC · JPL
129553	1996 TZ_{45}	—	October 7, 1996	Kitt Peak	Spacewatch	·	6.8 km	MPC · JPL
129554	1996 TC_{63}	—	October 6, 1996	La Silla	E. W. Elst	PHO	3.2 km	MPC · JPL
129555 Armazones	1996 UB_{3}	Armazones	October 30, 1996	Colleverde	V. S. Casulli	·	2.0 km	MPC · JPL
129556	1996 VY_{5}	—	November 15, 1996	Oizumi	T. Kobayashi	MAS	1.3 km	MPC · JPL
129557	1996 XA_{1}	—	December 2, 1996	Oizumi	T. Kobayashi	(5)	5.4 km	MPC · JPL
129558	1996 XQ_{8}	—	December 6, 1996	Kitt Peak	Spacewatch	·	1.3 km	MPC · JPL
129559	1996 YH	—	December 20, 1996	Oizumi	T. Kobayashi	EUN	3.0 km	MPC · JPL
129560	1997 CW_{12}	—	February 3, 1997	Kitt Peak	Spacewatch	·	1.8 km	MPC · JPL
129561 Chuhachi	1997 CS_{21}	Chuhachi	February 9, 1997	Kuma Kogen	A. Nakamura	·	3.6 km	MPC · JPL
129562	1997 CJ_{23}	—	February 4, 1997	Kitt Peak	Spacewatch	·	1.7 km	MPC · JPL
129563	1997 ER_{8}	—	March 2, 1997	Kitt Peak	Spacewatch	·	2.1 km	MPC · JPL
129564 Christy	1997 ER_{40}	Christy	March 7, 1997	Anderson Mesa	M. W. Buie	·	3.0 km	MPC · JPL
129565	1997 GS_{1}	—	April 2, 1997	Kitt Peak	Spacewatch	(12739)	2.6 km	MPC · JPL
129566	1997 GS_{8}	—	April 3, 1997	Socorro	LINEAR	·	3.2 km	MPC · JPL
129567	1997 GR_{9}	—	April 3, 1997	Socorro	LINEAR	·	5.0 km	MPC · JPL
129568	1997 GE_{11}	—	April 3, 1997	Socorro	LINEAR	·	3.5 km	MPC · JPL
129569	1997 GJ_{21}	—	April 6, 1997	Socorro	LINEAR	·	5.3 km	MPC · JPL
129570	1997 GE_{34}	—	April 3, 1997	Socorro	LINEAR	(21344)	3.1 km	MPC · JPL
129571	1997 GS_{35}	—	April 6, 1997	Socorro	LINEAR	·	3.1 km	MPC · JPL
129572	1997 GF_{44}	—	April 6, 1997	Socorro	LINEAR	·	4.0 km	MPC · JPL
129573	1997 HY_{1}	—	April 29, 1997	Kitt Peak	Spacewatch	·	4.0 km	MPC · JPL
129574	1997 JU_{8}	—	May 2, 1997	Kitt Peak	Spacewatch	·	3.8 km	MPC · JPL
129575	1997 LM	—	June 3, 1997	Xinglong	SCAP	·	5.4 km	MPC · JPL
129576	1997 RG_{2}	—	September 4, 1997	Caussols	ODAS	·	1.8 km	MPC · JPL
129577	1997 RA_{8}	—	September 9, 1997	Dynic	A. Sugie	NYS	1.8 km	MPC · JPL
129578	1997 RM_{10}	—	September 10, 1997	Bergisch Gladbach	W. Bickel	·	1.0 km	MPC · JPL
129579	1997 SF_{1}	—	September 21, 1997	Xinglong	SCAP	·	1.8 km	MPC · JPL
129580	1997 SV_{3}	—	September 23, 1997	Kitt Peak	Spacewatch	·	2.7 km	MPC · JPL
129581	1997 SB_{6}	—	September 23, 1997	Kitt Peak	Spacewatch	·	5.2 km	MPC · JPL
129582	1997 SC_{9}	—	September 27, 1997	Kitt Peak	Spacewatch	·	1.9 km	MPC · JPL
129583	1997 SV_{14}	—	September 28, 1997	Kitt Peak	Spacewatch	L4	10 km	MPC · JPL
129584	1997 SY_{17}	—	September 29, 1997	Needville	Dillon, W. G.	NYS	1.3 km	MPC · JPL
129585	1997 SM_{21}	—	September 29, 1997	Kitt Peak	Spacewatch	·	950 m	MPC · JPL
129586	1997 TE_{18}	—	October 3, 1997	Mallorca	Á. López J., R. Pacheco	·	6.7 km	MPC · JPL
129587	1997 TH_{21}	—	October 4, 1997	Kitt Peak	Spacewatch	·	1.2 km	MPC · JPL
129588	1997 TN_{21}	—	October 4, 1997	Kitt Peak	Spacewatch	·	1.7 km	MPC · JPL
129589	1997 UD	—	October 20, 1997	Prescott	P. G. Comba	·	1.6 km	MPC · JPL
129590	1997 UN	—	October 19, 1997	Kleť	Kleť	EOS	4.6 km	MPC · JPL
129591	1997 UL_{12}	—	October 23, 1997	Kitt Peak	Spacewatch	·	1.5 km	MPC · JPL
129592	1997 UP_{24}	—	October 30, 1997	Bergisch Gladbach	W. Bickel	·	1.4 km	MPC · JPL
129593	1997 UZ_{24}	—	October 27, 1997	Bergisch Gladbach	W. Bickel	EOS	5.3 km	MPC · JPL
129594	1997 UP_{25}	—	October 25, 1997	La Silla	Uppsala-DLR Trojan Survey	·	1.2 km	MPC · JPL
129595 Vand	1997 VD	Vand	November 2, 1997	Kleť	J. Tichá, M. Tichý	·	1.4 km	MPC · JPL
129596	1997 VR_{1}	—	November 2, 1997	Nanyo	T. Okuni	PHO	4.4 km	MPC · JPL
129597	1997 VT_{1}	—	November 4, 1997	Kleť	Kleť	·	1.4 km	MPC · JPL
129598	1997 VL_{3}	—	November 6, 1997	Oizumi	T. Kobayashi	·	2.4 km	MPC · JPL
129599	1997 VD_{8}	—	November 6, 1997	Xinglong	SCAP	NYS ·	2.8 km	MPC · JPL
129600	1997 WZ_{1}	—	November 19, 1997	Chichibu	N. Satō	·	2.0 km	MPC · JPL

== 129601–129700 ==
back to top

Designation			Discovery			Properties		Ref
Permanent	Provisional	Named after	Date	Site	Discoverer(s)	Category	Diam.	Ref
129601	1997 WE_{9}	—	November 21, 1997	Kitt Peak	Spacewatch	·	2.2 km	MPC · JPL
129602	1997 WA_{12}	—	November 22, 1997	Kitt Peak	Spacewatch	L4	16 km	MPC · JPL
129603	1997 WF_{12}	—	November 22, 1997	Kitt Peak	Spacewatch	NYS	1.9 km	MPC · JPL
129604	1997 WL_{12}	—	November 23, 1997	Kitt Peak	Spacewatch	MAS	910 m	MPC · JPL
129605	1997 WH_{29}	—	November 30, 1997	Kitt Peak	Spacewatch	VER	4.1 km	MPC · JPL
129606	1997 WU_{57}	—	November 26, 1997	La Silla	Uppsala-DLR Trojan Survey	·	2.4 km	MPC · JPL
129607	1997 WE_{58}	—	November 30, 1997	La Silla	Uppsala-DLR Trojan Survey	NYS	1.3 km	MPC · JPL
129608	1997 YQ_{8}	—	December 24, 1997	Stroncone	Santa Lucia	·	1.7 km	MPC · JPL
129609	1997 YO_{16}	—	December 31, 1997	Nachi-Katsuura	Y. Shimizu, T. Urata	·	1.8 km	MPC · JPL
129610	1998 AA_{1}	—	January 5, 1998	Oizumi	T. Kobayashi	·	2.5 km	MPC · JPL
129611	1998 AE_{2}	—	January 1, 1998	Kitt Peak	Spacewatch	NYS	1.8 km	MPC · JPL
129612	1998 AS_{2}	—	January 1, 1998	Kitt Peak	Spacewatch	·	1.7 km	MPC · JPL
129613	1998 BR_{6}	—	January 24, 1998	Oizumi	T. Kobayashi	·	1.8 km	MPC · JPL
129614	1998 BB_{25}	—	January 28, 1998	Oizumi	T. Kobayashi	·	3.1 km	MPC · JPL
129615	1998 BP_{30}	—	January 18, 1998	Kitt Peak	Spacewatch	·	2.3 km	MPC · JPL
129616	1998 BP_{34}	—	January 22, 1998	Kitt Peak	Spacewatch	·	3.0 km	MPC · JPL
129617	1998 BV_{41}	—	January 30, 1998	Modra	L. Kornoš, P. Kolény	·	2.5 km	MPC · JPL
129618	1998 DS_{11}	—	February 24, 1998	Haleakala	NEAT	·	2.9 km	MPC · JPL
129619	1998 DR_{17}	—	February 23, 1998	Kitt Peak	Spacewatch	·	2.8 km	MPC · JPL
129620	1998 EA_{3}	—	March 1, 1998	Xinglong	SCAP	·	1.6 km	MPC · JPL
129621	1998 ES_{5}	—	March 2, 1998	Kitt Peak	Spacewatch	·	2.9 km	MPC · JPL
129622	1998 FV_{2}	—	March 22, 1998	Kitt Peak	Spacewatch	·	2.1 km	MPC · JPL
129623	1998 FS_{20}	—	March 20, 1998	Socorro	LINEAR	NYS	2.5 km	MPC · JPL
129624	1998 FT_{25}	—	March 20, 1998	Socorro	LINEAR	·	4.1 km	MPC · JPL
129625	1998 FJ_{133}	—	March 20, 1998	Socorro	LINEAR	·	2.7 km	MPC · JPL
129626	1998 HN_{1}	—	April 20, 1998	Socorro	LINEAR	H	1.1 km	MPC · JPL
129627	1998 HA_{3}	—	April 21, 1998	Socorro	LINEAR	H	1.2 km	MPC · JPL
129628	1998 HH_{12}	—	April 19, 1998	Kitt Peak	Spacewatch	HNS	1.9 km	MPC · JPL
129629	1998 HW_{31}	—	April 22, 1998	Socorro	LINEAR	H	970 m	MPC · JPL
129630	1998 HK_{32}	—	April 20, 1998	Socorro	LINEAR	·	1.6 km	MPC · JPL
129631	1998 HF_{35}	—	April 20, 1998	Socorro	LINEAR	·	2.1 km	MPC · JPL
129632	1998 HV_{36}	—	April 20, 1998	Socorro	LINEAR	·	1.5 km	MPC · JPL
129633	1998 HD_{38}	—	April 20, 1998	Socorro	LINEAR	·	2.0 km	MPC · JPL
129634	1998 HP_{43}	—	April 20, 1998	Socorro	LINEAR	3:2	9.4 km	MPC · JPL
129635	1998 HN_{53}	—	April 21, 1998	Socorro	LINEAR	NYS	2.3 km	MPC · JPL
129636	1998 HF_{89}	—	April 21, 1998	Socorro	LINEAR	·	2.5 km	MPC · JPL
129637	1998 HH_{96}	—	April 21, 1998	Socorro	LINEAR	·	1.7 km	MPC · JPL
129638	1998 HE_{137}	—	April 20, 1998	Socorro	LINEAR	·	2.4 km	MPC · JPL
129639	1998 HS_{150}	—	April 20, 1998	Kitt Peak	Spacewatch	·	2.0 km	MPC · JPL
129640	1998 KB_{1}	—	May 19, 1998	Kitt Peak	Spacewatch	·	1.7 km	MPC · JPL
129641	1998 KC_{1}	—	May 22, 1998	Kitt Peak	Spacewatch	·	3.1 km	MPC · JPL
129642	1998 KU_{5}	—	May 19, 1998	Kitt Peak	Spacewatch	·	3.2 km	MPC · JPL
129643	1998 KH_{6}	—	May 22, 1998	Socorro	LINEAR	H	990 m	MPC · JPL
129644	1998 KQ_{8}	—	May 23, 1998	Anderson Mesa	LONEOS	·	1.3 km	MPC · JPL
129645	1998 KA_{22}	—	May 22, 1998	Socorro	LINEAR	·	2.2 km	MPC · JPL
129646	1998 KR_{26}	—	May 27, 1998	Kitt Peak	Spacewatch	·	7.1 km	MPC · JPL
129647	1998 LX_{2}	—	June 1, 1998	La Silla	E. W. Elst	RAF	2.0 km	MPC · JPL
129648	1998 MB_{4}	—	June 18, 1998	Kitt Peak	Spacewatch	·	4.6 km	MPC · JPL
129649	1998 MM_{4}	—	June 18, 1998	Mallorca	Á. López J., R. Pacheco	·	3.8 km	MPC · JPL
129650	1998 MC_{19}	—	June 19, 1998	Socorro	LINEAR	EUN	2.0 km	MPC · JPL
129651	1998 MF_{24}	—	June 25, 1998	Kitt Peak	Spacewatch	·	2.4 km	MPC · JPL
129652	1998 OA_{4}	—	July 24, 1998	Caussols	ODAS	·	2.9 km	MPC · JPL
129653	1998 QL_{3}	—	August 17, 1998	Socorro	LINEAR	H	1.6 km	MPC · JPL
129654	1998 QA_{12}	—	August 17, 1998	Socorro	LINEAR	·	2.8 km	MPC · JPL
129655	1998 QT_{15}	—	August 20, 1998	Anderson Mesa	LONEOS	·	3.6 km	MPC · JPL
129656	1998 QO_{16}	—	August 17, 1998	Socorro	LINEAR	·	4.1 km	MPC · JPL
129657	1998 QQ_{33}	—	August 17, 1998	Socorro	LINEAR	·	3.6 km	MPC · JPL
129658	1998 QV_{44}	—	August 17, 1998	Socorro	LINEAR	LEO	3.0 km	MPC · JPL
129659	1998 QZ_{44}	—	August 17, 1998	Socorro	LINEAR	GEF	2.4 km	MPC · JPL
129660	1998 QJ_{51}	—	August 17, 1998	Socorro	LINEAR	T_{j} (2.99)	6.7 km	MPC · JPL
129661	1998 QR_{54}	—	August 27, 1998	Anderson Mesa	LONEOS	·	2.9 km	MPC · JPL
129662	1998 QJ_{57}	—	August 30, 1998	Kitt Peak	Spacewatch	KOR	1.9 km	MPC · JPL
129663	1998 QS_{57}	—	August 30, 1998	Kitt Peak	Spacewatch	·	3.1 km	MPC · JPL
129664	1998 QS_{80}	—	August 24, 1998	Socorro	LINEAR	·	5.1 km	MPC · JPL
129665	1998 QX_{84}	—	August 24, 1998	Socorro	LINEAR	·	2.4 km	MPC · JPL
129666	1998 QT_{97}	—	August 24, 1998	Socorro	LINEAR	H	880 m	MPC · JPL
129667	1998 QY_{104}	—	August 26, 1998	La Silla	E. W. Elst	·	5.3 km	MPC · JPL
129668	1998 QE_{111}	—	August 28, 1998	Anderson Mesa	LONEOS	·	3.3 km	MPC · JPL
129669	1998 RY	—	September 12, 1998	Oizumi	T. Kobayashi	(5)	2.6 km	MPC · JPL
129670	1998 RU_{6}	—	September 12, 1998	Kitt Peak	Spacewatch	·	2.6 km	MPC · JPL
129671	1998 RA_{23}	—	September 14, 1998	Socorro	LINEAR	(5)	2.9 km	MPC · JPL
129672	1998 RR_{24}	—	September 14, 1998	Socorro	LINEAR	·	2.9 km	MPC · JPL
129673	1998 RN_{27}	—	September 14, 1998	Socorro	LINEAR	BRA	2.4 km	MPC · JPL
129674	1998 RQ_{36}	—	September 14, 1998	Socorro	LINEAR	GEF	1.8 km	MPC · JPL
129675	1998 RV_{36}	—	September 14, 1998	Socorro	LINEAR	GEF	2.0 km	MPC · JPL
129676	1998 RM_{42}	—	September 14, 1998	Socorro	LINEAR	(5)	2.4 km	MPC · JPL
129677	1998 RZ_{43}	—	September 14, 1998	Socorro	LINEAR	·	3.1 km	MPC · JPL
129678	1998 RQ_{50}	—	September 14, 1998	Socorro	LINEAR	·	3.2 km	MPC · JPL
129679	1998 RP_{57}	—	September 14, 1998	Socorro	LINEAR	·	4.8 km	MPC · JPL
129680	1998 RF_{58}	—	September 14, 1998	Socorro	LINEAR	HOF	4.2 km	MPC · JPL
129681	1998 RB_{60}	—	September 14, 1998	Socorro	LINEAR	·	3.7 km	MPC · JPL
129682	1998 RQ_{67}	—	September 14, 1998	Socorro	LINEAR	(5)	2.2 km	MPC · JPL
129683	1998 RO_{71}	—	September 14, 1998	Socorro	LINEAR	·	5.7 km	MPC · JPL
129684	1998 RD_{73}	—	September 14, 1998	Socorro	LINEAR	·	3.3 km	MPC · JPL
129685	1998 RX_{75}	—	September 14, 1998	Socorro	LINEAR	·	2.3 km	MPC · JPL
129686	1998 RB_{78}	—	September 14, 1998	Socorro	LINEAR	·	6.4 km	MPC · JPL
129687	1998 SO_{8}	—	September 20, 1998	Kitt Peak	Spacewatch	·	1.6 km	MPC · JPL
129688	1998 SK_{14}	—	September 17, 1998	Anderson Mesa	LONEOS	·	5.1 km	MPC · JPL
129689	1998 SN_{15}	—	September 16, 1998	Kitt Peak	Spacewatch	KOR	2.7 km	MPC · JPL
129690	1998 SF_{16}	—	September 16, 1998	Kitt Peak	Spacewatch	·	3.5 km	MPC · JPL
129691	1998 SH_{16}	—	September 16, 1998	Kitt Peak	Spacewatch	KOR	1.9 km	MPC · JPL
129692	1998 SR_{25}	—	September 22, 1998	Anderson Mesa	LONEOS	(5)	2.9 km	MPC · JPL
129693	1998 SW_{39}	—	September 23, 1998	Kitt Peak	Spacewatch	EOS	3.4 km	MPC · JPL
129694	1998 SP_{46}	—	September 25, 1998	Kitt Peak	Spacewatch	·	3.7 km	MPC · JPL
129695	1998 SY_{46}	—	September 25, 1998	Kitt Peak	Spacewatch	·	860 m	MPC · JPL
129696	1998 SG_{62}	—	September 19, 1998	Anderson Mesa	LONEOS	·	2.8 km	MPC · JPL
129697	1998 SO_{69}	—	September 19, 1998	Socorro	LINEAR	·	3.0 km	MPC · JPL
129698	1998 SH_{77}	—	September 26, 1998	Socorro	LINEAR	HOF	6.4 km	MPC · JPL
129699	1998 SN_{82}	—	September 26, 1998	Socorro	LINEAR	·	3.6 km	MPC · JPL
129700	1998 SS_{89}	—	September 26, 1998	Socorro	LINEAR	HYG	4.5 km	MPC · JPL

== 129701–129800 ==
back to top

Designation			Discovery			Properties		Ref
Permanent	Provisional	Named after	Date	Site	Discoverer(s)	Category	Diam.	Ref
129701	1998 SL_{93}	—	September 26, 1998	Socorro	LINEAR	KOR	2.5 km	MPC · JPL
129702	1998 SH_{118}	—	September 26, 1998	Socorro	LINEAR	·	4.2 km	MPC · JPL
129703	1998 SU_{120}	—	September 26, 1998	Socorro	LINEAR	·	5.3 km	MPC · JPL
129704	1998 SG_{124}	—	September 26, 1998	Socorro	LINEAR	TIR	6.4 km	MPC · JPL
129705	1998 SV_{135}	—	September 26, 1998	Socorro	LINEAR	·	6.1 km	MPC · JPL
129706	1998 SZ_{143}	—	September 18, 1998	La Silla	E. W. Elst	·	4.0 km	MPC · JPL
129707	1998 SM_{147}	—	September 20, 1998	La Silla	E. W. Elst	KOR	3.4 km	MPC · JPL
129708	1998 SM_{150}	—	September 26, 1998	Socorro	LINEAR	(5)	1.6 km	MPC · JPL
129709	1998 SW_{157}	—	September 26, 1998	Socorro	LINEAR	·	3.3 km	MPC · JPL
129710	1998 SX_{159}	—	September 26, 1998	Socorro	LINEAR	AGN	2.1 km	MPC · JPL
129711	1998 SH_{168}	—	September 16, 1998	Anderson Mesa	LONEOS	·	2.4 km	MPC · JPL
129712	1998 TH_{3}	—	October 14, 1998	Socorro	LINEAR	·	4.2 km	MPC · JPL
129713	1998 TR_{4}	—	October 13, 1998	Kitt Peak	Spacewatch	·	4.4 km	MPC · JPL
129714	1998 TE_{19}	—	October 14, 1998	Xinglong	SCAP	EOS	3.7 km	MPC · JPL
129715	1998 TW_{24}	—	October 14, 1998	Kitt Peak	Spacewatch	·	3.3 km	MPC · JPL
129716	1998 TA_{28}	—	October 15, 1998	Kitt Peak	Spacewatch	·	3.2 km	MPC · JPL
129717	1998 TT_{34}	—	October 14, 1998	Anderson Mesa	LONEOS	KOR	3.2 km	MPC · JPL
129718	1998 UR_{13}	—	October 23, 1998	Kitt Peak	Spacewatch	·	3.1 km	MPC · JPL
129719	1998 UG_{14}	—	October 23, 1998	Kitt Peak	Spacewatch	·	2.8 km	MPC · JPL
129720	1998 UZ_{30}	—	October 18, 1998	La Silla	E. W. Elst	·	3.5 km	MPC · JPL
129721	1998 VU_{2}	—	November 10, 1998	Caussols	ODAS	KOR	2.1 km	MPC · JPL
129722	1998 VK_{19}	—	November 10, 1998	Socorro	LINEAR	·	4.8 km	MPC · JPL
129723	1998 VU_{19}	—	November 10, 1998	Socorro	LINEAR	TIN	2.1 km	MPC · JPL
129724	1998 VV_{33}	—	November 11, 1998	Caussols	ODAS	·	4.7 km	MPC · JPL
129725	1998 VQ_{34}	—	November 14, 1998	Uenohara	N. Kawasato	·	3.8 km	MPC · JPL
129726	1998 VP_{37}	—	November 10, 1998	Socorro	LINEAR	·	4.0 km	MPC · JPL
129727	1998 VX_{49}	—	November 11, 1998	Socorro	LINEAR	·	4.3 km	MPC · JPL
129728	1998 WT_{9}	—	November 16, 1998	Socorro	LINEAR	(194)	4.6 km	MPC · JPL
129729	1998 WB_{19}	—	November 21, 1998	Socorro	LINEAR	·	5.0 km	MPC · JPL
129730	1998 WF_{21}	—	November 18, 1998	Socorro	LINEAR	·	3.0 km	MPC · JPL
129731	1998 WC_{28}	—	November 18, 1998	Kitt Peak	Spacewatch	·	6.3 km	MPC · JPL
129732	1998 WP_{33}	—	November 23, 1998	Anderson Mesa	LONEOS	·	6.6 km	MPC · JPL
129733	1998 XM_{13}	—	December 15, 1998	Caussols	ODAS	·	8.1 km	MPC · JPL
129734	1998 XY_{24}	—	December 12, 1998	Kitt Peak	Spacewatch	·	4.9 km	MPC · JPL
129735	1998 YU	—	December 16, 1998	Oizumi	T. Kobayashi	·	1.8 km	MPC · JPL
129736	1998 YW_{21}	—	December 26, 1998	Kitt Peak	Spacewatch	·	1.2 km	MPC · JPL
129737	1999 AA_{9}	—	January 9, 1999	Xinglong	SCAP	·	2.3 km	MPC · JPL
129738	1999 BT	—	January 16, 1999	Višnjan Observatory	K. Korlević	·	5.6 km	MPC · JPL
129739	1999 CA_{9}	—	February 12, 1999	Kitt Peak	Spacewatch	·	1.6 km	MPC · JPL
129740	1999 CK_{34}	—	February 10, 1999	Socorro	LINEAR	·	2.2 km	MPC · JPL
129741	1999 CT_{51}	—	February 10, 1999	Socorro	LINEAR	·	2.2 km	MPC · JPL
129742	1999 CU_{65}	—	February 12, 1999	Socorro	LINEAR	·	4.8 km	MPC · JPL
129743 Grimaldi	1999 CF_{82}	Grimaldi	February 15, 1999	Monte Agliale	S. Donati	·	1.2 km	MPC · JPL
129744	1999 CP_{108}	—	February 12, 1999	Socorro	LINEAR	·	2.1 km	MPC · JPL
129745	1999 CX_{109}	—	February 12, 1999	Socorro	LINEAR	·	1.5 km	MPC · JPL
129746	1999 CE_{119}	—	February 10, 1999	Mauna Kea	J. X. Luu, C. A. Trujillo, D. C. Jewitt	plutino	104 km	MPC · JPL
129747	1999 CZ_{133}	—	February 7, 1999	Kitt Peak	Spacewatch	·	1.1 km	MPC · JPL
129748	1999 CB_{136}	—	February 8, 1999	Kitt Peak	Spacewatch	·	1.6 km	MPC · JPL
129749	1999 CJ_{137}	—	February 9, 1999	Kitt Peak	Spacewatch	CYB	5.4 km	MPC · JPL
129750	1999 CA_{143}	—	February 12, 1999	Kitt Peak	Spacewatch	·	1.5 km	MPC · JPL
129751	1999 CP_{145}	—	February 8, 1999	Kitt Peak	Spacewatch	·	1.0 km	MPC · JPL
129752	1999 CX_{146}	—	February 9, 1999	Kitt Peak	Spacewatch	·	980 m	MPC · JPL
129753	1999 DG_{3}	—	February 21, 1999	Gekko	T. Kagawa	·	2.3 km	MPC · JPL
129754	1999 EE	—	March 9, 1999	Prescott	P. G. Comba	·	3.6 km	MPC · JPL
129755	1999 EK_{8}	—	March 14, 1999	Kitt Peak	Spacewatch	·	1.3 km	MPC · JPL
129756	1999 EG_{13}	—	March 9, 1999	Kitt Peak	Spacewatch	·	1.2 km	MPC · JPL
129757	1999 FX_{3}	—	March 16, 1999	Kitt Peak	Spacewatch	·	840 m	MPC · JPL
129758	1999 FG_{44}	—	March 20, 1999	Socorro	LINEAR	V	1.3 km	MPC · JPL
129759	1999 FU_{60}	—	March 22, 1999	Anderson Mesa	LONEOS	·	1.3 km	MPC · JPL
129760	1999 GO_{2}	—	April 5, 1999	Majorca	OAM	·	1.3 km	MPC · JPL
129761	1999 GL_{6}	—	April 14, 1999	Višnjan Observatory	K. Korlević	·	4.0 km	MPC · JPL
129762	1999 GZ_{10}	—	April 11, 1999	Kitt Peak	Spacewatch	·	1.3 km	MPC · JPL
129763	1999 GD_{11}	—	April 11, 1999	Kitt Peak	Spacewatch	(2076)	1.4 km	MPC · JPL
129764	1999 GK_{25}	—	April 6, 1999	Socorro	LINEAR	ERI	4.1 km	MPC · JPL
129765	1999 GG_{36}	—	April 7, 1999	Socorro	LINEAR	·	1.6 km	MPC · JPL
129766	1999 GC_{43}	—	April 12, 1999	Socorro	LINEAR	·	1.6 km	MPC · JPL
129767	1999 GT_{53}	—	April 11, 1999	Anderson Mesa	LONEOS	·	3.3 km	MPC · JPL
129768	1999 GG_{61}	—	April 15, 1999	Socorro	LINEAR	PHO	2.2 km	MPC · JPL
129769	1999 HN	—	April 17, 1999	Ondřejov	P. Pravec	·	1.9 km	MPC · JPL
129770	1999 HV	—	April 18, 1999	Woomera	F. B. Zoltowski	PHO	2.6 km	MPC · JPL
129771	1999 HQ_{1}	—	April 17, 1999	Socorro	LINEAR	·	2.0 km	MPC · JPL
129772	1999 HR_{11}	—	April 17, 1999	Kitt Peak	Kitt Peak	res · 4:7	132 km	MPC · JPL
129773 Catmerrill	1999 JJ_{1}	Catmerrill	May 8, 1999	Catalina	CSS	·	1.7 km	MPC · JPL
129774	1999 JM_{5}	—	May 10, 1999	Socorro	LINEAR	PHO	2.1 km	MPC · JPL
129775	1999 JU_{11}	—	May 12, 1999	Socorro	LINEAR	PHO	2.6 km	MPC · JPL
129776	1999 JL_{13}	—	May 10, 1999	Socorro	LINEAR	PHO	2.3 km	MPC · JPL
129777	1999 JO_{23}	—	May 10, 1999	Socorro	LINEAR	·	1.3 km	MPC · JPL
129778	1999 JY_{35}	—	May 10, 1999	Socorro	LINEAR	·	1.4 km	MPC · JPL
129779	1999 JV_{38}	—	May 10, 1999	Socorro	LINEAR	·	1.5 km	MPC · JPL
129780	1999 JJ_{42}	—	May 10, 1999	Socorro	LINEAR	·	3.0 km	MPC · JPL
129781	1999 JK_{46}	—	May 10, 1999	Socorro	LINEAR	·	1.3 km	MPC · JPL
129782	1999 JJ_{53}	—	May 10, 1999	Socorro	LINEAR	·	3.0 km	MPC · JPL
129783	1999 JG_{55}	—	May 10, 1999	Socorro	LINEAR	·	2.3 km	MPC · JPL
129784	1999 JB_{57}	—	May 10, 1999	Socorro	LINEAR	·	1.5 km	MPC · JPL
129785	1999 JF_{64}	—	May 10, 1999	Socorro	LINEAR	·	2.7 km	MPC · JPL
129786	1999 JU_{64}	—	May 10, 1999	Socorro	LINEAR	·	1.6 km	MPC · JPL
129787	1999 JZ_{71}	—	May 12, 1999	Socorro	LINEAR	·	2.2 km	MPC · JPL
129788	1999 JV_{73}	—	May 12, 1999	Socorro	LINEAR	·	2.5 km	MPC · JPL
129789	1999 JT_{85}	—	May 10, 1999	Socorro	LINEAR	·	1.7 km	MPC · JPL
129790	1999 JN_{108}	—	May 13, 1999	Socorro	LINEAR	V	1.8 km	MPC · JPL
129791	1999 JC_{109}	—	May 13, 1999	Socorro	LINEAR	NYS	1.6 km	MPC · JPL
129792	1999 JR_{110}	—	May 13, 1999	Socorro	LINEAR	NYS	1.7 km	MPC · JPL
129793	1999 JH_{111}	—	May 13, 1999	Socorro	LINEAR	·	1.3 km	MPC · JPL
129794	1999 JT_{116}	—	May 13, 1999	Socorro	LINEAR	NYS	1.6 km	MPC · JPL
129795	1999 JP_{118}	—	May 13, 1999	Socorro	LINEAR	·	1.7 km	MPC · JPL
129796	1999 JE_{121}	—	May 13, 1999	Socorro	LINEAR	·	1.2 km	MPC · JPL
129797	1999 JW_{123}	—	May 14, 1999	Socorro	LINEAR	NYS	1.8 km	MPC · JPL
129798	1999 JL_{129}	—	May 12, 1999	Socorro	LINEAR	·	2.2 km	MPC · JPL
129799	1999 JT_{130}	—	May 13, 1999	Socorro	LINEAR	·	1.9 km	MPC · JPL
129800	1999 JS_{131}	—	May 13, 1999	Socorro	LINEAR	V	1.3 km	MPC · JPL

== 129801–129900 ==
back to top

Designation			Discovery			Properties		Ref
Permanent	Provisional	Named after	Date	Site	Discoverer(s)	Category	Diam.	Ref
129801 Tommcmahon	1999 KB_{1}	Tommcmahon	May 17, 1999	Catalina	CSS	·	1.5 km	MPC · JPL
129802	1999 KP_{5}	—	May 16, 1999	Bergisch Gladbach	W. Bickel	·	980 m	MPC · JPL
129803	1999 KF_{9}	—	May 18, 1999	Socorro	LINEAR	·	1.3 km	MPC · JPL
129804	1999 KG_{10}	—	May 18, 1999	Socorro	LINEAR	NYS	2.2 km	MPC · JPL
129805	1999 KR_{10}	—	May 18, 1999	Socorro	LINEAR	·	1.2 km	MPC · JPL
129806	1999 KL_{11}	—	May 18, 1999	Socorro	LINEAR	·	2.3 km	MPC · JPL
129807 Stefanodougherty	1999 KV_{17}	Stefanodougherty	May 17, 1999	Catalina	CSS	NYS	2.2 km	MPC · JPL
129808	1999 KF_{18}	—	May 17, 1999	Socorro	LINEAR	PHO	2.7 km	MPC · JPL
129809	1999 LO_{20}	—	June 9, 1999	Socorro	LINEAR	·	2.3 km	MPC · JPL
129810	1999 LD_{26}	—	June 9, 1999	Socorro	LINEAR	PHO	2.3 km	MPC · JPL
129811 Stacyoliver	1999 LY_{33}	Stacyoliver	June 11, 1999	Catalina	CSS	·	1.3 km	MPC · JPL
129812	1999 MA_{1}	—	June 23, 1999	Woomera	F. B. Zoltowski	NYS	2.1 km	MPC · JPL
129813	1999 NJ	—	July 6, 1999	Reedy Creek	J. Broughton	·	1.5 km	MPC · JPL
129814	1999 NU_{5}	—	July 13, 1999	Socorro	LINEAR	NYS	2.1 km	MPC · JPL
129815	1999 NV_{5}	—	July 13, 1999	Socorro	LINEAR	·	1.9 km	MPC · JPL
129816	1999 NC_{23}	—	July 14, 1999	Socorro	LINEAR	·	2.1 km	MPC · JPL
129817	1999 NE_{25}	—	July 14, 1999	Socorro	LINEAR	·	1.6 km	MPC · JPL
129818	1999 NE_{28}	—	July 14, 1999	Socorro	LINEAR	ERI	2.9 km	MPC · JPL
129819	1999 NN_{30}	—	July 14, 1999	Socorro	LINEAR	NYS	2.1 km	MPC · JPL
129820	1999 NQ_{51}	—	July 12, 1999	Socorro	LINEAR	PHO	1.4 km	MPC · JPL
129821	1999 ND_{53}	—	July 12, 1999	Socorro	LINEAR	·	3.3 km	MPC · JPL
129822	1999 NV_{53}	—	July 12, 1999	Socorro	LINEAR	·	3.5 km	MPC · JPL
129823	1999 NJ_{55}	—	July 12, 1999	Socorro	LINEAR	·	1.8 km	MPC · JPL
129824	1999 NT_{55}	—	July 12, 1999	Socorro	LINEAR	·	1.7 km	MPC · JPL
129825	1999 NA_{56}	—	July 12, 1999	Socorro	LINEAR	EUN	4.2 km	MPC · JPL
129826	1999 NM_{56}	—	July 12, 1999	Socorro	LINEAR	EUN · slow	3.4 km	MPC · JPL
129827	1999 NQ_{56}	—	July 12, 1999	Socorro	LINEAR	·	2.8 km	MPC · JPL
129828	1999 PZ_{3}	—	August 13, 1999	Farpoint	G. Hug	H	1.0 km	MPC · JPL
129829	1999 RP	—	September 3, 1999	Ondřejov	L. Kotková	·	2.2 km	MPC · JPL
129830	1999 RQ_{3}	—	September 4, 1999	Catalina	CSS	·	2.4 km	MPC · JPL
129831	1999 RQ_{7}	—	September 3, 1999	Kitt Peak	Spacewatch	·	1.7 km	MPC · JPL
129832	1999 RC_{8}	—	September 4, 1999	Kitt Peak	Spacewatch	NYS	1.6 km	MPC · JPL
129833	1999 RC_{11}	—	September 7, 1999	Socorro	LINEAR	·	1.3 km	MPC · JPL
129834	1999 RV_{13}	—	September 7, 1999	Socorro	LINEAR	·	2.0 km	MPC · JPL
129835	1999 RW_{13}	—	September 7, 1999	Socorro	LINEAR	MAS	1.4 km	MPC · JPL
129836	1999 RL_{16}	—	September 7, 1999	Socorro	LINEAR	·	1.6 km	MPC · JPL
129837	1999 RR_{16}	—	September 7, 1999	Socorro	LINEAR	V	1.3 km	MPC · JPL
129838	1999 RS_{20}	—	September 7, 1999	Socorro	LINEAR	·	2.4 km	MPC · JPL
129839	1999 RH_{21}	—	September 7, 1999	Socorro	LINEAR	·	2.4 km	MPC · JPL
129840	1999 RU_{21}	—	September 7, 1999	Socorro	LINEAR	·	3.2 km	MPC · JPL
129841	1999 RG_{25}	—	September 7, 1999	Socorro	LINEAR	·	4.5 km	MPC · JPL
129842	1999 RT_{25}	—	September 7, 1999	Socorro	LINEAR	(5)	1.7 km	MPC · JPL
129843	1999 RY_{25}	—	September 7, 1999	Socorro	LINEAR	(5)	2.1 km	MPC · JPL
129844	1999 RC_{26}	—	September 7, 1999	Socorro	LINEAR	·	1.8 km	MPC · JPL
129845	1999 RG_{27}	—	September 7, 1999	Socorro	LINEAR	H	1.0 km	MPC · JPL
129846	1999 RO_{29}	—	September 8, 1999	Socorro	LINEAR	·	2.2 km	MPC · JPL
129847	1999 RH_{40}	—	September 13, 1999	Ondřejov	P. Kušnirák, P. Pravec	·	2.8 km	MPC · JPL
129848	1999 RY_{48}	—	September 7, 1999	Socorro	LINEAR	·	2.0 km	MPC · JPL
129849	1999 RX_{55}	—	September 7, 1999	Socorro	LINEAR	·	1.7 km	MPC · JPL
129850	1999 RW_{63}	—	September 7, 1999	Socorro	LINEAR	V	1.2 km	MPC · JPL
129851	1999 RV_{65}	—	September 7, 1999	Socorro	LINEAR	·	2.2 km	MPC · JPL
129852	1999 RN_{91}	—	September 7, 1999	Socorro	LINEAR	NYS	2.0 km	MPC · JPL
129853	1999 RJ_{94}	—	September 7, 1999	Socorro	LINEAR	·	2.4 km	MPC · JPL
129854	1999 RT_{94}	—	September 7, 1999	Socorro	LINEAR	·	3.7 km	MPC · JPL
129855	1999 RX_{96}	—	September 7, 1999	Socorro	LINEAR	·	1.7 km	MPC · JPL
129856	1999 RX_{101}	—	September 8, 1999	Socorro	LINEAR	·	4.2 km	MPC · JPL
129857	1999 RR_{107}	—	September 8, 1999	Socorro	LINEAR	V	1.1 km	MPC · JPL
129858	1999 RW_{113}	—	September 9, 1999	Socorro	LINEAR	·	4.9 km	MPC · JPL
129859	1999 RV_{115}	—	September 9, 1999	Socorro	LINEAR	·	1.9 km	MPC · JPL
129860	1999 RJ_{139}	—	September 9, 1999	Socorro	LINEAR	V	1.5 km	MPC · JPL
129861	1999 RM_{142}	—	September 9, 1999	Socorro	LINEAR	·	2.0 km	MPC · JPL
129862	1999 RN_{155}	—	September 9, 1999	Socorro	LINEAR	·	1.5 km	MPC · JPL
129863	1999 RJ_{157}	—	September 9, 1999	Socorro	LINEAR	·	4.2 km	MPC · JPL
129864	1999 RJ_{161}	—	September 9, 1999	Socorro	LINEAR	·	1.8 km	MPC · JPL
129865	1999 RA_{170}	—	September 9, 1999	Socorro	LINEAR	·	3.5 km	MPC · JPL
129866	1999 RQ_{171}	—	September 9, 1999	Socorro	LINEAR	·	4.5 km	MPC · JPL
129867	1999 RU_{173}	—	September 9, 1999	Socorro	LINEAR	·	1.9 km	MPC · JPL
129868	1999 RC_{187}	—	September 9, 1999	Socorro	LINEAR	·	3.2 km	MPC · JPL
129869	1999 RJ_{198}	—	September 9, 1999	Socorro	LINEAR	·	4.3 km	MPC · JPL
129870	1999 RF_{200}	—	September 8, 1999	Socorro	LINEAR	·	5.1 km	MPC · JPL
129871	1999 RH_{203}	—	September 8, 1999	Socorro	LINEAR	·	1.8 km	MPC · JPL
129872	1999 RW_{212}	—	September 8, 1999	Socorro	LINEAR	·	2.7 km	MPC · JPL
129873	1999 RH_{214}	—	September 15, 1999	Uccle	T. Pauwels, Ipatov, S. I.	·	1.6 km	MPC · JPL
129874	1999 RN_{219}	—	September 6, 1999	Anderson Mesa	LONEOS	·	1.5 km	MPC · JPL
129875	1999 RZ_{248}	—	September 7, 1999	Socorro	LINEAR	·	2.1 km	MPC · JPL
129876 Stevenpeterson	1999 RA_{254}	Stevenpeterson	September 4, 1999	Catalina	CSS	·	1.8 km	MPC · JPL
129877	1999 SP_{2}	—	September 22, 1999	Socorro	LINEAR	PHO	2.2 km	MPC · JPL
129878	1999 SQ_{2}	—	September 21, 1999	Kleť	Kleť	EUN	2.5 km	MPC · JPL
129879 Tishasaltzman	1999 SV_{4}	Tishasaltzman	September 29, 1999	Catalina	CSS	MAR	1.9 km	MPC · JPL
129880	1999 SX_{4}	—	September 28, 1999	Monte Agliale	Santangelo, M. M. M.	AEO	2.5 km	MPC · JPL
129881 Chucksee	1999 SK_{16}	Chucksee	September 29, 1999	Catalina	CSS	·	1.8 km	MPC · JPL
129882 Ustica	1999 TO	Ustica	October 1, 1999	Campo Catino	F. Mallia, M. Di Sora	·	3.2 km	MPC · JPL
129883	1999 TO_{2}	—	October 2, 1999	Fountain Hills	C. W. Juels	EUN	3.0 km	MPC · JPL
129884	1999 TB_{4}	—	October 2, 1999	Ondřejov	L. Kotková	·	3.6 km	MPC · JPL
129885	1999 TW_{7}	—	October 2, 1999	Socorro	LINEAR	·	3.6 km	MPC · JPL
129886	1999 TA_{9}	—	October 7, 1999	Višnjan Observatory	K. Korlević, M. Jurić	·	3.1 km	MPC · JPL
129887	1999 TT_{17}	—	October 15, 1999	Ondřejov	P. Kušnirák, P. Pravec	·	2.4 km	MPC · JPL
129888	1999 TF_{21}	—	October 3, 1999	Socorro	LINEAR	H	920 m	MPC · JPL
129889	1999 TH_{25}	—	October 3, 1999	Socorro	LINEAR	EUN	2.3 km	MPC · JPL
129890	1999 TE_{29}	—	October 4, 1999	Socorro	LINEAR	·	1.6 km	MPC · JPL
129891	1999 TO_{29}	—	October 4, 1999	Socorro	LINEAR	(5)	2.0 km	MPC · JPL
129892	1999 TS_{34}	—	October 2, 1999	Socorro	LINEAR	·	3.4 km	MPC · JPL
129893	1999 TW_{34}	—	October 3, 1999	Socorro	LINEAR	H	1.5 km	MPC · JPL
129894	1999 TK_{35}	—	October 4, 1999	Socorro	LINEAR	·	2.9 km	MPC · JPL
129895	1999 TM_{35}	—	October 4, 1999	Socorro	LINEAR	H	1.2 km	MPC · JPL
129896	1999 TP_{35}	—	October 4, 1999	Socorro	LINEAR	·	4.1 km	MPC · JPL
129897	1999 TV_{35}	—	October 6, 1999	Socorro	LINEAR	·	2.0 km	MPC · JPL
129898 Sanfordselznick	1999 TP_{39}	Sanfordselznick	October 3, 1999	Catalina	CSS	H	1.1 km	MPC · JPL
129899	1999 TC_{41}	—	October 2, 1999	Kitt Peak	Spacewatch	HNS	2.5 km	MPC · JPL
129900	1999 TE_{44}	—	October 3, 1999	Kitt Peak	Spacewatch	HOF	4.1 km	MPC · JPL

== 129901–130000 ==
back to top

Designation			Discovery			Properties		Ref
Permanent	Provisional	Named after	Date	Site	Discoverer(s)	Category	Diam.	Ref
129901	1999 TM_{53}	—	October 6, 1999	Kitt Peak	Spacewatch	·	4.3 km	MPC · JPL
129902	1999 TO_{61}	—	October 7, 1999	Kitt Peak	Spacewatch	·	2.5 km	MPC · JPL
129903	1999 TO_{64}	—	October 8, 1999	Kitt Peak	Spacewatch	·	3.0 km	MPC · JPL
129904	1999 TF_{69}	—	October 9, 1999	Kitt Peak	Spacewatch	·	2.8 km	MPC · JPL
129905	1999 TV_{69}	—	October 9, 1999	Kitt Peak	Spacewatch	·	1.8 km	MPC · JPL
129906	1999 TF_{78}	—	October 11, 1999	Kitt Peak	Spacewatch	·	1.7 km	MPC · JPL
129907	1999 TN_{78}	—	October 11, 1999	Kitt Peak	Spacewatch	(12739)	2.3 km	MPC · JPL
129908	1999 TN_{89}	—	October 2, 1999	Socorro	LINEAR	·	2.3 km	MPC · JPL
129909	1999 TH_{97}	—	October 2, 1999	Socorro	LINEAR	·	5.4 km	MPC · JPL
129910	1999 TO_{97}	—	October 2, 1999	Socorro	LINEAR	·	3.2 km	MPC · JPL
129911	1999 TH_{99}	—	October 2, 1999	Socorro	LINEAR	JUN	2.0 km	MPC · JPL
129912	1999 TK_{99}	—	October 2, 1999	Socorro	LINEAR	·	4.8 km	MPC · JPL
129913	1999 TW_{99}	—	October 2, 1999	Socorro	LINEAR	·	2.7 km	MPC · JPL
129914	1999 TR_{101}	—	October 2, 1999	Socorro	LINEAR	·	2.0 km	MPC · JPL
129915	1999 TA_{107}	—	October 4, 1999	Socorro	LINEAR	·	2.2 km	MPC · JPL
129916	1999 TJ_{108}	—	October 4, 1999	Socorro	LINEAR	·	2.7 km	MPC · JPL
129917	1999 TH_{114}	—	October 4, 1999	Socorro	LINEAR	·	2.5 km	MPC · JPL
129918	1999 TP_{115}	—	October 4, 1999	Socorro	LINEAR	·	1.3 km	MPC · JPL
129919	1999 TJ_{116}	—	October 4, 1999	Socorro	LINEAR	(5)	1.5 km	MPC · JPL
129920	1999 TY_{119}	—	October 4, 1999	Socorro	LINEAR	·	3.0 km	MPC · JPL
129921	1999 TF_{123}	—	October 4, 1999	Socorro	LINEAR	·	2.5 km	MPC · JPL
129922	1999 TD_{124}	—	October 4, 1999	Socorro	LINEAR	·	4.4 km	MPC · JPL
129923	1999 TJ_{126}	—	October 4, 1999	Socorro	LINEAR	MAR	1.8 km	MPC · JPL
129924	1999 TK_{127}	—	October 4, 1999	Socorro	LINEAR	(5) · fast	2.1 km	MPC · JPL
129925	1999 TM_{127}	—	October 15, 1999	Socorro	LINEAR	fast	2.7 km	MPC · JPL
129926	1999 TO_{127}	—	October 4, 1999	Socorro	LINEAR	KRM	4.2 km	MPC · JPL
129927	1999 TU_{127}	—	October 4, 1999	Socorro	LINEAR	·	1.9 km	MPC · JPL
129928	1999 TN_{131}	—	October 6, 1999	Socorro	LINEAR	·	2.3 km	MPC · JPL
129929	1999 TV_{141}	—	October 15, 1999	Socorro	LINEAR	fast	2.9 km	MPC · JPL
129930	1999 TX_{141}	—	October 7, 1999	Socorro	LINEAR	MAS	1.2 km	MPC · JPL
129931	1999 TV_{144}	—	October 7, 1999	Socorro	LINEAR	(5)	1.8 km	MPC · JPL
129932	1999 TB_{148}	—	October 7, 1999	Socorro	LINEAR	·	3.2 km	MPC · JPL
129933	1999 TE_{149}	—	October 7, 1999	Socorro	LINEAR	·	2.7 km	MPC · JPL
129934	1999 TA_{151}	—	October 7, 1999	Socorro	LINEAR	·	3.2 km	MPC · JPL
129935	1999 TJ_{153}	—	October 7, 1999	Socorro	LINEAR	·	6.1 km	MPC · JPL
129936	1999 TY_{153}	—	October 7, 1999	Socorro	LINEAR	·	2.6 km	MPC · JPL
129937	1999 TH_{156}	—	October 7, 1999	Socorro	LINEAR	·	2.3 km	MPC · JPL
129938	1999 TA_{163}	—	October 9, 1999	Socorro	LINEAR	·	1.7 km	MPC · JPL
129939	1999 TH_{163}	—	October 9, 1999	Socorro	LINEAR	·	2.1 km	MPC · JPL
129940	1999 TS_{166}	—	October 10, 1999	Socorro	LINEAR	·	2.3 km	MPC · JPL
129941	1999 TB_{170}	—	October 10, 1999	Socorro	LINEAR	·	2.6 km	MPC · JPL
129942	1999 TX_{171}	—	October 10, 1999	Socorro	LINEAR	·	3.1 km	MPC · JPL
129943	1999 TK_{174}	—	October 10, 1999	Socorro	LINEAR	(5)	1.9 km	MPC · JPL
129944	1999 TC_{182}	—	October 11, 1999	Socorro	LINEAR	RAF	2.4 km	MPC · JPL
129945	1999 TS_{184}	—	October 12, 1999	Socorro	LINEAR	GAL	3.0 km	MPC · JPL
129946	1999 TQ_{191}	—	October 12, 1999	Socorro	LINEAR	·	5.5 km	MPC · JPL
129947	1999 TB_{195}	—	October 12, 1999	Socorro	LINEAR	·	2.1 km	MPC · JPL
129948	1999 TL_{212}	—	October 15, 1999	Socorro	LINEAR	ADE	3.6 km	MPC · JPL
129949	1999 TG_{213}	—	October 15, 1999	Socorro	LINEAR	PHO	1.9 km	MPC · JPL
129950	1999 TH_{214}	—	October 15, 1999	Socorro	LINEAR	H	770 m	MPC · JPL
129951	1999 TV_{219}	—	October 1, 1999	Kitt Peak	Spacewatch	·	3.3 km	MPC · JPL
129952	1999 TW_{220}	—	October 1, 1999	Anderson Mesa	LONEOS	V	1.5 km	MPC · JPL
129953	1999 TE_{225}	—	October 2, 1999	Kitt Peak	Spacewatch	·	3.4 km	MPC · JPL
129954 Corksauve	1999 TA_{236}	Corksauve	October 3, 1999	Catalina	CSS	·	1.8 km	MPC · JPL
129955 Eriksyrstad	1999 TY_{248}	Eriksyrstad	October 8, 1999	Catalina	CSS	·	4.1 km	MPC · JPL
129956	1999 TT_{255}	—	October 9, 1999	Kitt Peak	Spacewatch	KOR	1.8 km	MPC · JPL
129957	1999 TQ_{262}	—	October 15, 1999	Socorro	LINEAR	(5)	3.5 km	MPC · JPL
129958	1999 TV_{265}	—	October 3, 1999	Socorro	LINEAR	·	3.5 km	MPC · JPL
129959	1999 TW_{272}	—	October 3, 1999	Socorro	LINEAR	·	4.9 km	MPC · JPL
129960	1999 TP_{276}	—	October 6, 1999	Socorro	LINEAR	RAF	1.5 km	MPC · JPL
129961	1999 TP_{288}	—	October 10, 1999	Socorro	LINEAR	·	1.7 km	MPC · JPL
129962 Williamverts	1999 TY_{294}	Williamverts	October 1, 1999	Catalina	CSS	·	2.3 km	MPC · JPL
129963 Marvinwalthall	1999 TZ_{296}	Marvinwalthall	October 2, 1999	Catalina	CSS	·	3.4 km	MPC · JPL
129964	1999 TY_{314}	—	October 8, 1999	Kitt Peak	Spacewatch	KON ·	3.7 km	MPC · JPL
129965	1999 UZ_{4}	—	October 29, 1999	Kitt Peak	Spacewatch	MAR	1.4 km	MPC · JPL
129966 Michaelward	1999 UU_{5}	Michaelward	October 29, 1999	Catalina	CSS	·	1.5 km	MPC · JPL
129967	1999 UL_{10}	—	October 31, 1999	Socorro	LINEAR	H	1.2 km	MPC · JPL
129968 Mitchwhiteley	1999 UA_{15}	Mitchwhiteley	October 29, 1999	Catalina	CSS	·	4.0 km	MPC · JPL
129969 Bradwilliams	1999 UV_{16}	Bradwilliams	October 29, 1999	Catalina	CSS	·	2.1 km	MPC · JPL
129970	1999 UH_{19}	—	October 30, 1999	Kitt Peak	Spacewatch	·	2.0 km	MPC · JPL
129971	1999 UM_{22}	—	October 31, 1999	Kitt Peak	Spacewatch	·	1.3 km	MPC · JPL
129972	1999 UF_{23}	—	October 31, 1999	Kitt Peak	Spacewatch	·	2.8 km	MPC · JPL
129973 Michaeldaly	1999 UW_{25}	Michaeldaly	October 30, 1999	Catalina	CSS	·	3.3 km	MPC · JPL
129974	1999 US_{33}	—	October 31, 1999	Kitt Peak	Spacewatch	AGN	1.8 km	MPC · JPL
129975	1999 UA_{36}	—	October 31, 1999	Kitt Peak	Spacewatch	·	4.4 km	MPC · JPL
129976	1999 UJ_{36}	—	October 16, 1999	Kitt Peak	Spacewatch	·	1.6 km	MPC · JPL
129977	1999 UK_{36}	—	October 16, 1999	Kitt Peak	Spacewatch	·	1.5 km	MPC · JPL
129978	1999 UC_{39}	—	October 29, 1999	Anderson Mesa	LONEOS	PHO	2.1 km	MPC · JPL
129979	1999 UF_{40}	—	October 16, 1999	Socorro	LINEAR	(5)	2.1 km	MPC · JPL
129980 Catherinejohnson	1999 UN_{42}	Catherinejohnson	October 28, 1999	Catalina	CSS	·	2.5 km	MPC · JPL
129981	1999 UZ_{44}	—	October 30, 1999	Kitt Peak	Spacewatch	·	1.6 km	MPC · JPL
129982 Jeffseabrook	1999 UJ_{45}	Jeffseabrook	October 31, 1999	Catalina	CSS	·	2.5 km	MPC · JPL
129983	1999 UR_{48}	—	October 30, 1999	Kitt Peak	Spacewatch	·	3.4 km	MPC · JPL
129984	1999 UC_{51}	—	October 31, 1999	Anderson Mesa	LONEOS	EUN	2.2 km	MPC · JPL
129985 Jimfreemantle	1999 UP_{51}	Jimfreemantle	October 31, 1999	Catalina	CSS	·	3.5 km	MPC · JPL
129986	1999 UP_{53}	—	October 19, 1999	Kitt Peak	Spacewatch	·	2.0 km	MPC · JPL
129987	1999 UL_{62}	—	October 31, 1999	Catalina	CSS	H	1.0 km	MPC · JPL
129988 Camerondickinson	1999 VH_{4}	Camerondickinson	November 1, 1999	Catalina	CSS	·	3.4 km	MPC · JPL
129989	1999 VS_{5}	—	November 5, 1999	Kitt Peak	Spacewatch	·	1.7 km	MPC · JPL
129990	1999 VW_{13}	—	November 2, 1999	Socorro	LINEAR	H	860 m	MPC · JPL
129991	1999 VL_{14}	—	November 2, 1999	Socorro	LINEAR	H	1.1 km	MPC · JPL
129992	1999 VQ_{16}	—	November 2, 1999	Kitt Peak	Spacewatch	·	2.6 km	MPC · JPL
129993	1999 VN_{18}	—	November 2, 1999	Kitt Peak	Spacewatch	·	3.2 km	MPC · JPL
129994	1999 VQ_{18}	—	November 2, 1999	Kitt Peak	Spacewatch	·	3.6 km	MPC · JPL
129995	1999 VA_{20}	—	November 10, 1999	Višnjan Observatory	K. Korlević	EUN	2.3 km	MPC · JPL
129996	1999 VF_{25}	—	November 13, 1999	Oizumi	T. Kobayashi	·	3.1 km	MPC · JPL
129997	1999 VH_{28}	—	November 3, 1999	Socorro	LINEAR	·	3.5 km	MPC · JPL
129998	1999 VA_{31}	—	November 3, 1999	Socorro	LINEAR	·	2.9 km	MPC · JPL
129999	1999 VM_{33}	—	November 3, 1999	Socorro	LINEAR	NYS	1.7 km	MPC · JPL
130000	1999 VX_{33}	—	November 3, 1999	Socorro	LINEAR	·	2.5 km	MPC · JPL

back to top

== See also ==
- Meanings of minor-planet names: 129001–130000
