= 15415 Rika =

Main-belt asteroid

Discovery
- Discovered by: A. Nakamura
- Discovery site: Kuma Kogen Obs.
- Discovery date: 4 February 1998

Designations
- Named after: Rika Akana (character in the drama Tokyo Love Story)
- Alternative designations: 1998 CA_{1} · 1983 PC_{1} 1983 PH · 1997 WK_{22}
- Minor planet category: main-belt · (inner) background · Flora

Orbital characteristics
- Epoch 23 March 2018 (JD 2458200.5)
- Uncertainty parameter 0
- Observation arc: 63.41 yr (23,161 d)
- Aphelion: 2.7047 AU
- Perihelion: 1.6979 AU
- Semi-major axis: 2.2013 AU
- Eccentricity: 0.2287
- Orbital period (sidereal): 3.27 yr (1,193 d)
- Mean anomaly: 194.33°
- Mean motion: 0° 18^{m} 6.48^{s} / day
- Inclination: 7.4787°
- Longitude of ascending node: 327.38°
- Argument of perihelion: 28.661°

Physical characteristics
- Mean diameter: 2.830±0.488 km 3.74 km (calculated)
- Synodic rotation period: 6.3636±0.0008 h (Note: Pravec (2006) Lightcurve plot of (15415) Rika by Husárik and Kusnirák, from Ondrejov data published by the NEO Photometric Program and collaborating projects: rotation period 6.3632±0.0007 hours (basically identical with 6.3636±0.0008 h) and a brightness amplitude of 1.06 mag. Quality code is 3. Summary figures at the LCDB.)
- Geometric albedo: 0.24 (assumed); 0.6053±0.2264
- Spectral type: S (assumed)
- Absolute magnitude (H): 14.2; 14.21; 14.3

15415 Rika (provisional designation 1998 CA_{1}) is a bright background asteroid from the Florian region of the inner asteroid belt, approximately 3 kilometers (2 miles) in diameter. It was discovered on 4 February 1998, by Japanese astronomer Akimasa Nakamura at the Kuma Kogen Astronomical Observatory in southern Japan. The presumed S-type asteroid has a rotation period of 6.36 hours and possibly an elongated shape. It was named after Rika Akana, a character in the Japanese film and later television adapted drama Tokyo Love Story.

== Orbit and classification ==
Rika is a non-family asteroid of the main belt's background population when applying the hierarchical clustering method to its proper orbital elements. Based on osculating Keplerian orbital elements, the asteroid has also been classified as a member of the Flora family (402), a giant asteroid family and the largest family of stony asteroids in the main-belt.

It orbits the Sun in the inner asteroid belt at a distance of 1.7–2.7 astronomical units (AU) once every 3 years and 3 months (1,193 days; semi-major axis of 2.2 AU). Its orbit has an eccentricity of 0.23 and an inclination of 7° with respect to the ecliptic.

Rika's observation arc begins with a precovery published by the Digitized Sky Survey and taken at the Palomar Observatory in November 1954, more than 43 years prior to its official discovery observation at Kuma Kogen.

== Physical characteristics ==
Rika is an assumed, common S-type asteroid, despite the exceptionally high albedo (see below) measured by the Wide-field Infrared Survey Explorer (WISE).

=== Rotation period ===
In October 2006, a rotational lightcurve of Rika was obtained from photometric observations by astronomers at the Skalnaté pleso Observatory in Slovakia. Lightcurve analysis gave a well-defined rotation period of 6.3636 hours with a high brightness amplitude of 1.06 magnitude, indicating that the body has an elongated shape (U=3).

=== Diameter and albedo ===
According to the survey carried out by the NEOWISE mission of NASA's WISE telescope, Rika measures 2.830 kilometers in diameter and its surface has a high albedo of 0.6053. The Collaborative Asteroid Lightcurve Link assumes an albedo of 0.24 – derived from 8 Flora, the parent body of the Flora family – and calculates a diameter of 3.74 kilometers based on an absolute magnitude of 14.3.

== Naming ==
This minor planet was named after Rika Akana, the heroine played by Honami Suzuki in the manga-based Japanese television drama Tokyo Love Story. Some episodes of the dorama were filmed on locations near the town of Kumakōgen, where the discovering observatory of this asteroid is located.

The official naming citation was published by the Minor Planet Center on 13 October 2000 (M.P.C. 41388).
