= Akimasa Nakamura =

Japanese astronomer (born 1961)

Minor planets discovered: 112
see § List of discovered minor planets

Akimasa Nakamura (中村 彰正, Nakamura Akimasa; fl. 1990s) (born 1961) is a Japanese astronomer. He is a prolific observer of asteroids and comets, as well as a discoverer of minor planets. He has worked extensively at the Kuma Kogen Astronomical Observatory near Kuma, Ehime Prefecture, where he remains a staff member. His observations of asteroid brightness are well known.

== Career ==
Nakamura is also member of the Yamaneko Group of Comet Observers. He named main-belt asteroid 44711 Carp for his favorite baseball team, the Hiroshima Carp, and named 9081 Hideakianno after Japanese animation and film director, Hideaki Anno.

== Awards and honors ==
The asteroid 10633 Akimasa, orbiting between Mars and Jupiter, is named after him and was named in 1999 to coincide with his becoming a father.

== List of discovered minor planets ==
6255 Kuma	December 5, 1994
6800 Saragamine	October 29, 1994
6804 Maruseppu	November 16, 1995
7206 Shiki	August 18, 1996
7438 Misakatouge	May 12, 1994
7484 Dogo Onsen	November 30, 1994
7678 Onoda	February 15, 1996
7716 Ube	February 22, 1996
7788 Tsukuba	December 5, 1994
7905 Juzoitami	July 24, 1997
8306 Shoko	February 24, 1995
8432 Tamakasuga	December 27, 1997
8552 Hyoichi	April 20, 1995
8720 Takamizawa	November 16, 1995
9076 Shinsaku	May 8, 1994
9081 Hideakianno	November 3, 1994
9235 Shimanamikaido	February 9, 1997
9658 Imabari	February 28, 1996
10163 Onomichi	January 26, 1995
10375 Michiokuga	April 21, 1996
10601 Hiwatashi	October 16, 1996
10609 Hirai	November 28, 1996
10850 Denso	January 26, 1995
11115 Kariya	November 21, 1995
11612 Obu	December 21, 1995

12408 Fujioka	September 20, 1995
12796 Kamenrider	November 16, 1995
13207 Tamagawa	April 10, 1997
13221 Nao	July 24, 1997
13239 Kana	May 21, 1998
14939 Norikura	February 21, 1995
15370 Kanchi	July 15, 1996
15415 Rika	February 4, 1998
15841 Yamaguchi	July 27, 1995
15868 Akiyoshidai	July 16, 1996
15921 Kintaikyo	November 1, 1997
16759 Furuyama	October 10, 1996
16807 Terasako	October 12, 1997
20151 Utsunomiya	October 5, 1996
22402 Goshi	April 3, 1995
22489 Yanaka	April 7, 1997
23644 Yamaneko	January 13, 1997
24962 Kenjitoba	October 27, 1997
24981 Shigekimurakami	May 22, 1998
26937 Makimiyamoto	March 31, 1997
27003 Katoizumi	February 21, 1998
27396 Shuji	March 13, 2000
29737 Norihiro	January 21, 1999
29986 Shunsuke	December 3, 1999
31061 Tamao	October 10, 1996

31671 Masatoshi	May 13, 1999
39635 Kusatao	December 27, 1994
44711 Carp	October 3, 1999
46643 Yanase	May 23, 1995
46737 Anpanman	November 1, 1997
47077 Yuji	December 16, 1998
47293 Masamitsu	November 16, 1999
48575 Hawaii	July 4, 1994
48736 Ehime	February 27, 1997
49440 Kenzotange	December 21, 1998
52421 Daihoji	June 1, 1994
52601 Iwayaji	September 29, 1997
54237 Hiroshimanabe	May 5, 2000
58466 Santoka	July 23, 1996
58707 Kyoshi	February 2, 1998
65775 Reikotosa	September 18, 1995
67853 Iwamura	November 22, 2000
75308 Shoin	December 7, 1999
79254 Tsuda	December 23, 1994
79333 Yusaku	October 5, 1996
80184 Hekigoto	November 10, 1999
80984 Santomurakami	March 6, 2000
85308 Atsushimori	November 30, 1994
91213 Botchan	December 22, 1998
91395 Sakanouenokumo	June 5, 1999

91907 Shiho	November 13, 1999
92097 Aidai	December 3, 1999
94356 Naruto	August 28, 2001
96254 Hoyo	February 27, 1995
97582 Hijikawa	March 6, 2000
100266 Sadamisaki	October 14, 1994
100309 Misuzukaneko	April 20, 1995
100675 Chuyanakahara	December 4, 1997
105675 Kamiukena	September 26, 2000
107805 Saibi	March 21, 2001
108720 Kamikuroiwa	July 22, 2001
110742 Tetuokudo	October 18, 2001
110743 Hirobumi	October 18, 2001
125473 Keisaku	November 20, 2001
129561 Chuhachi	February 9, 1997
140038 Kurushima	September 18, 2001
145732 Kanmon	February 21, 1995
147971 Nametoko	November 24, 1994
150129 Besshi	November 8, 1994
152657 Yukifumi	December 4, 1997
158241 Yutonagatomo	October 12, 2001
160903 Shiokaze	October 14, 2001
162035 Jirotakahashi	December 17, 1995
162755 Spacesora	November 28, 2000
163153 Takuyaonishi	February 12, 2002

173936 Yuribo	November 17, 2001
200234 Kumashiro	November 4, 1999
202909 Jakoten	October 11, 1996
208499 Shokasonjuku	November 17, 2001
213255 Kimiyayui	March 15, 2001
217726 Kitabeppu	November 16, 1999
(221977) 1995 WG_{1}	November 16, 1995
222249 Itsuki	August 3, 2000
(241592) 1998 KV	May 21, 1998
(333862) 1995 WF_{1}	November 16, 1995
(337055) 1997 BT_{6}	January 31, 1997
(399314) 1996 RG_{4}	September 10, 1996

== See also ==
- List of minor planet discoverers § A. Nakamura
