= Kuma Kogen Astronomical Observatory =

Kuma Kogen Observatory
- Observatory code: 360
- Location: Kumakōgen, Ehime Prefecture
- Coordinates: 33°40′27″N 132°56′39″E
- Established: 1992

Telescopes
- Unnamed: 60cm reflecting telescope
- Related media on Commons

Kumakōgen's location

The Kuma Kogen Astronomical Observatory (Obs. code: 360) is located at Kumakōgen in Ehime Prefecture, Japan.

The observatory is in the Furusato Country Open Air Museum that incorporates the Seiten Castle (sei ten means "fine weather" and can also mean "star sky".)

== Telescope ==
The observatory has a 60 cm aperture optical telescope.

Members of the public can book to observe at night, weather permitting.

== Planetarium ==
A 40-seat planetarium is attached to the facility. Thirty-minute shows are conducted during the day.

== Staff ==
The observatory's staff member, Akimasa Nakamura, is best known for their discovery of asteroids.
