= 10415 Mali Lošinj =

Main-belt asteroid

Discovery
- Discovered by: K. Korlević
- Discovery site: Višnjan Obs.
- Discovery date: 23 October 1998

Designations
- Named after: Mali Lošinj (Croatian town on island Lošinj)
- Alternative designations: 1998 UT_{15} · 1925 VM; 1962 WE_{1} · 1977 TN_{3} 1987 SW_{20} · 1988 VW_{7}
- Minor planet category: main-belt · (outer) background

Orbital characteristics
- Epoch 4 September 2017 (JD 2458000.5)
- Uncertainty parameter 0
- Observation arc: 54.52 yr (19,915 days)
- Aphelion: 3.0650 AU
- Perihelion: 2.9115 AU
- Semi-major axis: 2.9883 AU
- Eccentricity: 0.0257
- Orbital period (sidereal): 5.17 yr (1,887 days)
- Mean anomaly: 121.02°
- Mean motion: 0° 11^{m} 26.88^{s} / day
- Inclination: 14.427°
- Longitude of ascending node: 221.70°
- Argument of perihelion: 298.55°

Physical characteristics
- Dimensions: 13.514±0.135; 14.912±0.112 km 16.20±0.70 km 18.77 km (calculated)
- Synodic rotation period: 240.5115±20.6153 h
- Geometric albedo: 0.057 (assumed); 0.128±0.019; 0.1521±0.0344
- Spectral type: C · X
- Absolute magnitude (H): 11.54±0.44 · 11.8 · 11.9 · 11.911±0.002 (R) · 12.36

10415 Mali Lošinj (provisional designation 1998 UT_{15}) is a dark background asteroid and very slow rotator from the outer region of the asteroid belt, approximately 16 kilometers in diameter. It was discovered by Croatian astronomer Korado Korlević at Višnjan Observatory, Croatia, on 23 October 1998. The asteroid was named after the Croatian town of Mali Lošinj.

== Orbit and classification ==
Mali Lošinj orbits the Sun in the outer main-belt at a distance of 2.9–3.1 AU once every 5 years and 2 months (1,887 days). Its orbit has an eccentricity of 0.03 and an inclination of 14° with respect to the ecliptic. The first used precovery was obtained at Goethe Link Observatory in 1962, extending the asteroid's observation arc by 36 years prior to its discovery. The first unused observations were made at Heidelberg Observatory in 1925.

== Physical characteristics ==
Mali Lošinj has also been characterized as an X-type asteroid by Pan-STARRS photometric survey.

=== Slow rotators ===
In September 2013, photometric observations at the Palomar Transient Factory in California gave a rotational lightcurve that showed a period of 240.5115 hours with a brightness amplitude of 0.48 in magnitude (U=2). Mali Lošinj is a slow rotator, as asteroids of this size usually rotate within hours once around its axis.

=== Diameter and albedo ===
According to the surveys carried out by NASA's Wide-field Infrared Survey Explorer and its subsequent NEOWISE mission, Mali Lošinj measures between 13.5 and 16.2 kilometers in diameter and its surface has an albedo between 0.13 and 0.15. The Collaborative Asteroid Lightcurve Link assumes a standard albedo for carbonaceous asteroids of 0.057 and calculates a somewhat larger diameter of 18.8 kilometers with an absolute magnitude of 12.36.

== Naming ==
This minor planet was named after the Croatian town of Mali Lošinj, located on the island of Lošinj, in the northern Adriatic Sea. The island and the town are well known for its nautical school and the Leo Brener Observatory. The minor planet 10645 Brač is also named after a Croatian island in the Adriatic Sea. The approved naming citation was published by the Minor Planet Center on 15 December 2005 (M.P.C. 55720).
