= 10241 Miličević =

Themistian asteroid

Discovery
- Discovered by: K. Korlević
- Discovery site: Višnjan Obs.
- Discovery date: 9 January 1999

Designations
- Named after: Nikola Miličević (Croatian hermit)
- Alternative designations: 1999 AU_{6} · 1981 UX_{24} 1996 KB_{1} · 1997 WB_{49}
- Minor planet category: main-belt · (outer); Themis

Orbital characteristics
- Epoch 23 March 2018 (JD 2458200.5)
- Uncertainty parameter 0
- Observation arc: 35.69 yr (13,034 d)
- Aphelion: 3.5285 AU
- Perihelion: 2.5672 AU
- Semi-major axis: 3.0479 AU
- Eccentricity: 0.1577
- Orbital period (sidereal): 5.32 yr (1,944 d)
- Mean anomaly: 345.06°
- Mean motion: 0° 11^{m} 6.72^{s} / day
- Inclination: 1.6172°
- Longitude of ascending node: 151.77°
- Argument of perihelion: 190.89°

Physical characteristics
- Mean diameter: 10.882±0.159 km 8.39 km (calculated)
- Synodic rotation period: 3.87±0.03 h
- Geometric albedo: 0.057 (assumed); 0.065±0.005
- Spectral type: C
- Absolute magnitude (H): 13.4; 13.6; 13.66±0.11 (R); 13.67±0.18; 14.11

10241 Miličević, provisional designation 1999 AU_{6}, is a carbonaceous Themistian asteroid from the outer regions of the asteroid belt, approximately 11 kilometers (6.8 miles) in diameter. It was discovered on 9 January 1999, by Croatian astronomer Korado Korlević at the Višnjan Observatory in Croatia. The C-type asteroid has a short rotation period of 3.87 hours and was named after hermit and amateur astronomer Don Nikola Miličević.

== Orbit and classification ==
Miličević is a Themistian asteroid that belongs to the Themis family (602), a very large family of carbonaceous asteroids, named after 24 Themis. It orbits the Sun in the outer main-belt at a distance of 2.6–3.5 AU once every 5 years and 4 months (1,944 days; semi-major axis of 3.05 AU). Its orbit has an eccentricity of 0.16 and an inclination of 2° with respect to the ecliptic.

The body's observation arc begins with its first observation at Palomar Observatory in October 1981, more than 17 years prior to its official discovery observation at Višnjan.

== Physical characteristics ==
Based on its classification to the Themis family and on observations conducted by the Pan-STARRS survey, Miličević is a carbonaceous C-type asteroid.

=== Rotation period ===
In December 2014, a rotational lightcurve of Miličević was obtained from photometric observations in the R-band by astronomers at the Palomar Transient Factory in California. Lightcurve analysis gave a short rotation period of 3.87 hours with a brightness amplitude of 0.34 magnitude (U=2).

=== Diameter and albedo ===
According to the survey carried out by the NEOWISE mission of NASA's Wide-field Infrared Survey Explorer, Miličević measures 10.882 kilometers in diameter and its surface has an albedo of 0.065, while the Collaborative Asteroid Lightcurve Link assumes a standard albedo for a carbonaceous asteroid of 0.057 and calculates a diameter of 8.39 kilometers based on an absolute magnitude of 14.11.

== Naming ==
This minor planet was named after Don Nikola Miličević (1887–1963), Croatian amateur astronomer and last administrator of Blaca hermitage. The Hermitage is a UNESCO World Heritage Site located on the Brač island in Croatia. The official naming citation was published by the Minor Planet Center on 15 December 2005 (M.P.C. 55720).
