= 10645 Brač =

Asteroid

Discovery
- Discovered by: K. Korlević
- Discovery site: Višnjan Obs.
- Discovery date: 14 March 1999

Designations
- Named after: Brač (Croatian island)
- Alternative designations: 1999 ES_{4} · 1962 TN; 1968 BF · 1975 TJ_{1} 1980 YK · 1986 EH_{5} 1988 SX_{4}
- Minor planet category: main-belt · Eunomia

Orbital characteristics
- Epoch 4 September 2017 (JD 2458000.5)
- Uncertainty parameter 0
- Observation arc: 54.67 yr (19,968 days)
- Aphelion: 3.1430 AU
- Perihelion: 2.1725 AU
- Semi-major axis: 2.6578 AU
- Eccentricity: 0.1826
- Orbital period (sidereal): 4.33 yr (1,583 days)
- Mean anomaly: 224.98°
- Mean motion: 0° 13^{m} 39^{s} / day
- Inclination: 12.520°
- Longitude of ascending node: 351.57°
- Argument of perihelion: 44.961°

Physical characteristics
- Dimensions: 9.60 km (calculated); 10.26±0.11 km
- Synodic rotation period: 2.785±0.005 h 2.78592±0.00003 h
- Geometric albedo: 0.202±0.038; 0.21 (assumed)
- Spectral type: S · LS
- Absolute magnitude (H): 12.5 · 12.4 · 12.3 · 12.41±0.50

10645 Brač, provisional designation 1999 ES_{4}, is a stony Eunomia asteroid from the central region of the asteroid belt, approximately 10 kilometers in diameter. It was discovered on 14 March 1999, by Croatian astronomer Korado Korlević at Višnjan Observatory, and named after the Croatian island of Brač.

== Classification and orbit ==
The asteroid is a member of the Eunomia family, a large group of S-type asteroids and the most prominent family in the intermediate main-belt. It orbits the Sun at a distance of 2.2–3.1 AU once every 4 years and 4 months (1,583 days). Its orbit has an eccentricity of 0.18 and an inclination of 13° with respect to the ecliptic. The first precovery was taken at the U.S. Goethe Link Observatory in 1962, extending the asteroid's observation arc by 37 years prior to discovery.

== Physical characteristics ==
In October 2014, photometric observations by Italian astronomer Silvano Casulli gave a rotational lightcurve with a period of 2.78592±0.00003 hours and a brightness amplitude of 0.31 in magnitude (U=3-). Three weeks later, a second lightcurve was obtained at the U.S. Etscorn Campus Observatory in New Mexico, rendering a concurring period of 2.785±0.005 with an identical variation in brightness (U=3-).

According to the survey carried out by NASA's space-based Wide-field Infrared Survey Explorer with its subsequent NEOWISE mission, the asteroid measures 10.3 kilometers in diameter and its surface has an albedo of 0.202±0.038, while the Collaborative Asteroid Lightcurve Link assumes an albedo of 0.21 and calculates a diameter of 9.6 kilometers. A large-scale survey by Pan-STARRS (PS1) assigns an LS-type, an intermediary spectral type between the common, stony S-types and the rather rare and reddish L-type asteroids.

== Naming ==
This minor planet was named after the Croatian island of Brač, the largest Dalmatian island in the Adriatic Sea, and the place where the Blaca hermitage Observatory is located. The approved naming citation was published by the Minor Planet Center on 15 December 2005 (M.P.C. 55720).
