= 22899 Alconrad =

Binary asteroid

- Alconrad and its satellite imaged by the Hubble Space Telescope from November to December 2005

Discovery
- Discovered by: K. Korlević; M. Jurić
- Discovery site: Višnjan Obs.
- Discovery date: 11 October 1999

Designations
- Named after: Albert R. Conrad (American AO-expert)
- Alternative designations: 1999 TO_{14} · 1998 ML_{48}
- Minor planet category: main-belt · Koronis

Orbital characteristics
- Epoch 4 September 2017 (JD 2458000.5)
- Uncertainty parameter 0
- Observation arc: 21.57 yr (7,877 days)
- Aphelion: 3.0790 AU
- Perihelion: 2.6094 AU
- Semi-major axis: 2.8442 AU
- Eccentricity: 0.0825
- Orbital period (sidereal): 4.80 yr (1,752 days)
- Mean anomaly: 300.93°
- Mean motion: 0° 12^{m} 19.8^{s} / day
- Inclination: 2.8820°
- Longitude of ascending node: 136.00°
- Argument of perihelion: 220.62°
- Known satellites: 1 (Note: IAUC No. 8232, S/2003 (22899) 1, 26 October 2003 Reports the "discovery on July 26.6 UT, on six direct images (two sets of three images taken 20 min apart in time) made with the Hubble Space Telescope (+ ACS/HRC) in the F606W (600-nm broadband) filter, of a satellite of minor planet (22899) 1999 TO_14 (V about 18). The satellite is clearly separated in five of these images but streaked in a sixth due to pointing jitter. Trails of several background stars in successive images indicate that the target object is not a background binary star. On July 26.6545, the satellite was at separation 0".14 (projected separation 170 km) in p.a. 235 deg. Using the average albedo of the Koronis family (about 0.21), to which (22899) belongs, the size of the primary is estimated to be 4.5 km. The brightness difference is about 2.5 mag, giving an estimated diameter of the secondary of about 1.5 km. This then is the smallest main-belt asteroid known to be binary." reported by: W. J. Merline, Southwest Research Institute (SwRI); P. M. Tamblyn, Binary Astronomy and SwRI; C. R. Chapman, D. Nesvorny, and D. D. Durda, SwRI; C. Dumas, JPL; A. D. Storrs, Towson University; L. M. Close, University of Arizona; and F. Menard, Observatoire de Grenoble, France. Central Bureau for Astronomical Telegrams – IAUC 8232)

Physical characteristics
- Dimensions: 4.5 km 4.94 km (calculated); 5.682±0.471 km
- Synodic rotation period: 4.03±0.03 h 5.0206±0.0029 h
- Geometric albedo: 0.181±0.029; 0.21; 0.24 (assumed)
- Spectral type: S
- Absolute magnitude (H): 13.677±0.004 (R) · 13.7 · 13.8 · 13.96±0.25

22899 Alconrad (provisional designation 1999 TO_{14}) is a Koronian asteroid and binary system from the outer region of the asteroid belt, approximately 5 kilometers in diameter. It was discovered on 11 October 1999, by Croatian astronomers Korado Korlević and Mario Jurić at the Višnjan Observatory, Croatia.

When its minor-planet moon was discovered in 2003, it was the smallest known main-belt asteroid to possess a satellite. It was later named after American astronomer Albert R. Conrad.

== Classification and orbit ==
Alconrad belongs to the Koronis family, a collisional group of stony asteroids consisting of a few hundred known bodies with nearly ecliptical orbits. It orbits the Sun in the outer main-belt at a distance of 2.6–3.1 AU once every 4 years and 10 months (1,752 days). Its orbit has an eccentricity of 0.08 and an inclination of 3° with respect to the ecliptic. The body's observation arc begins 5 years prior to its official discovery observation, with a precovery taken by Steward Observatory's Spacewatch program in October 1994.

== Physical characteristics ==
=== Rotation period ===
In December 2009, a rotational lightcurve of Alconrad was obtained from photometric observations at the ground-based Wise Observatory in Mitzpe Ramon, Israel. Lightcurve analysis gave a rotation period of 4.03 hours with a brightness variation of 0.19 magnitude (U=2).

In October 2013, photometric observations by astronomers in the R-band at the Palomar Transient Factory in California gave a period of 5.0206 with an amplitude of 0.14 magnitude (U=2).

=== Diameter and albedo ===
According to the survey carried out by the NEOWISE mission of NASA's Wide-field Infrared Survey Explorer, Alconrad measures 5.7 kilometers in diameter and its surface has an albedo of 0.18, while the Collaborative Asteroid Lightcurve Link assumes a standard albedo for members of the Koronis family of 0.24, and calculates a diameter of 4.9 kilometers with an absolute magnitude of 13.7.

== Naming ==
This minor planet was named in honor of American astronomer Albert R. Conrad (born 1953) who worked at various observatories in the United States. Expert in and developer of adaptive optics, he has studied the natural satellites of the Solar System for their shape and topography, and co-discovered many asteroid moons in the process. The official naming citation was published by the Minor Planet Center on 20 June 2016 (M.P.C. 100606).

== Satellite ==
In October 2003, researchers at Southwest Research Institute using the Hubble Space Telescope discovered a moon orbiting Alconrad, which was later named Juliekaibarreto. They calculated a diameter of 4.5 kilometers for the primary, based on an assumed albedo of 0.21. The researchers also measured a large angular separation of 0".14 between Alconrad and its moon. This is equivalent to a distance of 170 kilometers, or 182 kilometers, when using a/R_{p} ratio of 81. Based on a difference in magnitude of 2.5, the satellite measures 1 to 1.5 kilometers in diameter. It was named after Julie Kai Barreto, Albert Conrad's wife.

When the binary nature of Alconrad was discovered in 2003, it was the smallest binary asteroid known at the time. Since then, other binaries with a smaller primary have been discovered such as, for example, 4868 Knushevia (1.5 km) in 2015, and 8026 Johnmckay (1.7 km) in 2010.
