= Marino Dusić =

Croatian astronomer

Minor planets discovered: 2
11706 Rijeka	20 April 1998	MPC^{[A]}
12512 Split	21 April 1998	MPC^{[A]}
^{A} with Korado Korlević

Marino Dusić is a Croatian astronomer and a discoverer of minor planets.

He studied Computer science at the University of Ljubljana in Slovenia. Along with astronomer Korado Korlević, he discovered two asteroids, 11706 Rijeka and 12512 Split, at the Višnjan Observatory, Croatia, in 1998.
