= Mario Jurić =

Croatian astronomer

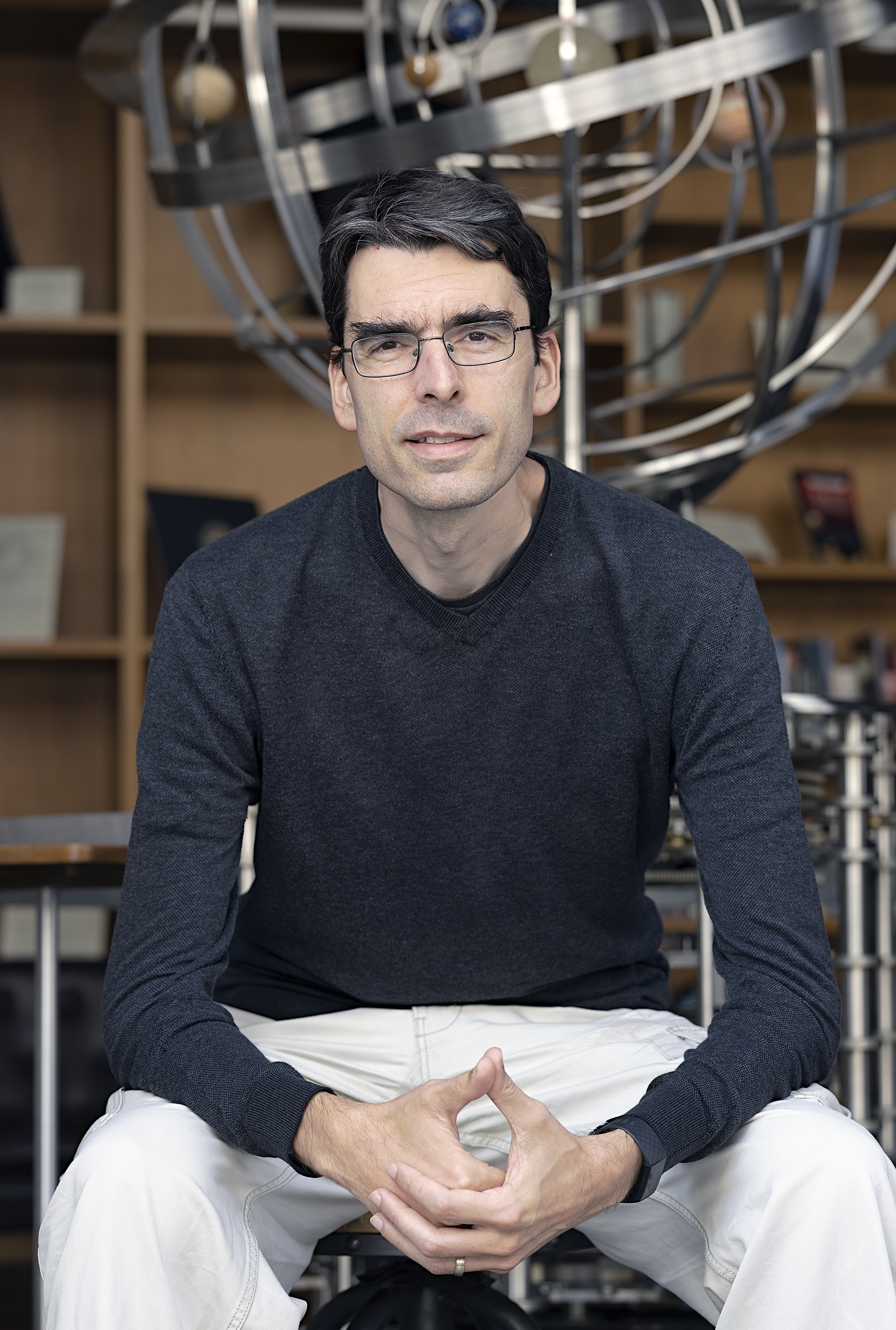
- Jurić in 2022
- Born: February 9, 1979 (age 47); Zagreb, SFR Yugoslavia (now Zagreb, Croatia)
- Occupations: astronomer; astrophysicist

Minor planets discovered: 125
see § List of discovered minor planets

Mario Jurić (Croatian pronunciation: [mâːrio jǔːrit͡ɕ]; born 9 February 1979) is a Croatian astronomer and a University of Washington professor.

Jurić was born in Zagreb. He graduated from the University of Zagreb Faculty of Science, and received a doctorate at Princeton University in 2007. He was a Data Management Project Scientist for the Large Synoptic Survey Telescope.

Together with prolific amateur astronomer Korado Korlević, Jurić has co-discovered 125 asteroids, and one comet, 183P/Korlević-Jurić. He took part in discovery of the Sloan Great Wall, at the time the largest known structure in the Universe. His co-discovery, the Koronian asteroid 22899 Alconrad is one of the smallest known binary asteroids in the main-belt.

== List of discovered minor planets ==
(12930) 1999 TJ_{6}^{[1]}	October 2, 1999
13408 Deadoklestic^{[1]}	October 10, 1999
(14215) 1999 TV_{6}^{[1]}	October 6, 1999
(14687) 1999 YR_{13}^{[1]}	December 30, 1999
(15055) 1998 YS_{9}^{[1]}	December 25, 1998
(15458) 1998 YW_{9}^{[1]}	December 25, 1998
(15459) 1998 YY_{9}^{[1]}	December 25, 1998
(15542) 2000 DN_{3}^{[1]}	February 28, 2000
(15995) 1998 YQ_{9}^{[1]}	December 25, 1998
(16082) 1999 TR_{5}^{[1]}	October 2, 1999
(18173) 2000 QD_{8}^{[1]}	August 25, 2000
(18758) 1999 HD_{2}^{[1]}	April 19, 1999
(19705) 1999 TR_{10}^{[1]}	October 7, 1999
(19706) 1999 TU_{11}^{[1]}	October 10, 1999
(21803) 1999 TC_{7}^{[1]}	October 6, 1999
(21805) 1999 TQ_{9}^{[1]}	October 8, 1999
(21806) 1999 TE_{14}^{[1]}	October 10, 1999
(21807) 1999 TH_{14}^{[1]}	October 10, 1999
(22896) 1999 TU_{6}^{[1]}	October 6, 1999
(22897) 1999 TH_{7}^{[1]}	October 6, 1999
22899 Alconrad ^{[1]}	October 11, 1999
(23156) 2000 DM_{3}^{[1]}	February 28, 2000
(23971) 1998 YU_{9}^{[1]}	December 25, 1998
(25359) 1999 TW_{11}^{[1]}	October 10, 1999
(25360) 1999 TK_{14}^{[1]}	October 10, 1999

(26536) 2000 DL_{3}^{[1]}	February 27, 2000
(28404) 1999 TQ_{5}^{[1]}	October 1, 1999
(28515) 2000 DK_{3}^{[1]}	February 27, 2000
(29833) 1999 FJ^{[1]}	March 16, 1999
(31394) 1998 YX_{9}^{[1]}	December 25, 1998
(33428) 1999 DO_{3}^{[1]}	February 18, 1999
(33429) 1999 DL_{4}^{[1]}	February 23, 1999
(33531) 1999 HG_{2}^{[1]}	April 20, 1999
(33795) 1999 TR_{6}^{[1]}	October 6, 1999
(34124) 2000 QS^{[1]}	August 22, 2000
(34136) 2000 QF_{6}^{[1]}	August 24, 2000
(34171) 2000 QZ_{34}^{[1]}	August 26, 2000
(35762) 1999 HF_{2}^{[1]}	April 20, 1999
(36181) 1999 TT_{10}^{[1]}	October 8, 1999
(36456) 2000 QC_{8}^{[1]}	August 25, 2000
(36457) 2000 QF_{8}^{[1]}	August 25, 2000
(36458) 2000 QO_{8}^{[1]}	August 25, 2000
(38063) 1999 FH^{[1]}	March 16, 1999
(38456) 1999 TO_{6}^{[1]}	October 6, 1999
(38457) 1999 TJ_{9}^{[1]}	October 7, 1999
(38460) 1999 TH_{13}^{[1]}	October 7, 1999
(40748) 1999 TO_{5}^{[1]}	October 1, 1999
(40749) 1999 TP_{6}^{[1]}	October 6, 1999
(40750) 1999 TA_{7}^{[1]}	October 6, 1999
(40751) 1999 TD_{7}^{[1]}	October 6, 1999

(40752) 1999 TO_{7}^{[1]}	October 7, 1999
(40753) 1999 TK_{8}^{[1]}	October 6, 1999
(40754) 1999 TM_{8}^{[1]}	October 6, 1999
(40755) 1999 TO_{8}^{[1]}	October 6, 1999
(40756) 1999 TQ_{8}^{[1]}	October 7, 1999
(40762) 1999 TL_{14}^{[1]}	October 11, 1999
(42926) 1999 TJ_{7}^{[1]}	October 6, 1999
(43332) 2000 QG_{6}^{[1]}	August 28, 2000
(44533) 1998 YN_{9}^{[1]}	December 24, 1998
(44534) 1998 YZ_{9}^{[1]}	December 25, 1998
(44713) 1999 TP_{5}^{[1]}	October 1, 1999
(44718) 1999 TP_{8}^{[1]}	October 7, 1999
(44719) 1999 TP_{9}^{[1]}	October 8, 1999
(44720) 1999 TS_{9}^{[1]}	October 8, 1999
(44722) 1999 TQ_{10}^{[1]}	October 6, 1999
(44726) 1999 TT_{14}^{[1]}	October 7, 1999
(45599) 2000 DJ_{3}^{[1]}	February 27, 2000
(47081) 1998 YV_{9}^{[1]}	December 25, 1998
(47165) 1999 TM_{14}^{[1]}	October 11, 1999
(49446) 1998 YO_{9}^{[1]}	December 25, 1998
(49595) 1999 FG^{[1]}	March 16, 1999
(49680) 1999 TN_{9}^{[1]}	December 25, 1998
(50415) 2000 DL_{2}^{[1]}	February 24, 2000
(56820) 2000 QK_{8}^{[1]}	August 26, 2000
(59474) 1999 HK_{2}^{[1]}	April 20, 2000

(59475) 1999 HN_{2}^{[1]}	April 19, 2000
(60003) 1999 TM_{7}^{[1]}	October 7, 1999
(60005) 1999 TW_{15}^{[1]}	October 7, 1999
(66663) 1999 TV_{8}^{[1]}	October 6, 1999
(66664) 1999 TB_{9}^{[1]}	October 7, 1999
(66665) 1999 TC_{9}^{[1]}	October 7, 1999
(66666) 1999 TL_{9}^{[1]}	October 7, 1999
(66668) 1999 TN_{14}^{[1]}	October 11, 1999
(70018) 1998 YP_{9}^{[1]}	December 25, 1998
(70437) 1999 TK_{6}^{[1]}	October 6, 1999
(70438) 1999 TX_{6}^{[1]}	October 6, 1999
(70439) 1999 TE_{7}^{[1]}	October 6, 1999
(70442) 1999 TR_{9}^{[1]}	October 8, 1999
(70447) 1999 TG_{14}^{[1]}	October 10, 1999
(71546) 2000 DK_{2}^{[1]}	February 24, 2000
(74812) 1999 TN_{5}^{[1]}	October 1, 1999
(74813) 1999 TB_{7}^{[1]}	October 6, 1999
(75986) 2000 DO_{3}^{[1]}	February 28, 2000
(80019) 1999 HL_{2}^{[1]}	April 23, 1999
(85843) 1998 YT_{9}^{[1]}	December 25, 1998
(86206) 1999 TK_{9}^{[1]}	October 7, 1999
(86207) 1999 TP_{15}^{[1]}	October 7, 1999
(91274) 1999 DM_{3}^{[1]}	February 18, 1999
(91312) 1999 GE_{7}^{[1]}	April 13, 1999
(91593) 1999 TF_{7}^{[1]}	October 6, 1999

(91594) 1999 TN_{8}^{[1]}	October 6, 1999
(92623) 2000 QB_{8}^{[1]}	August 25, 2000
(97852) 2000 QH_{6}^{[1]}	August 24, 2000
(97853) 2000 QM_{8}^{[1]}	August 25, 2000
(98120) 2000 SK_{5}^{[1]}	September 22, 2000
(102220) 1999 TJ_{8}^{[1]}	October 6, 1999
(102221) 1999 TT_{9}^{[1]}	October 7, 1999
(118416) 1999 TD_{9}^{[1]}	October 7, 1999
(118493) 2000 DH_{3}^{[1]}	February 27, 2000
(122307) 2000 QE_{8}^{[1]}	August 25, 2000
(122308) 2000 QJ_{8}^{[1]}	August 25, 2000
(129886) 1999 TA_{9}^{[1]}	October 7, 1999
(134578) 1999 TN_{7}^{[1]}	October 7, 1999
(137309) 1999 TM_{5}^{[1]}	October 1, 1999
(137310) 1999 TF_{9}^{[1]}	October 7, 1999
(162493) 2000 QY_{7}^{[1]}	August 25, 2000
(162494) 2000 QA_{8}^{[1]}	August 25, 2000
(162499) 2000 QZ_{33}^{[1]}	August 26, 2000
(168503) 1999 TL_{8}^{[1]}	October 6, 1999
(173451) 2000 QN_{8}^{[1]}	August 25, 2000
(185756) 1999 TM_{9}^{[1]}	October 7, 1999
(192684) 1999 TW_{6}^{[1]}	October 6, 1999
(217698) 1999 TG_{9}^{[1]}	October 7, 1999
(251796) 1999 TO_{9}^{[1]}	October 8, 1999
(275566) 1999 TL_{7}^{[1]}	October 7, 1999
1. ^{1} with K. Korlević
