= Korado Korlević =

Croatian teacher and prolific amateur astronomer

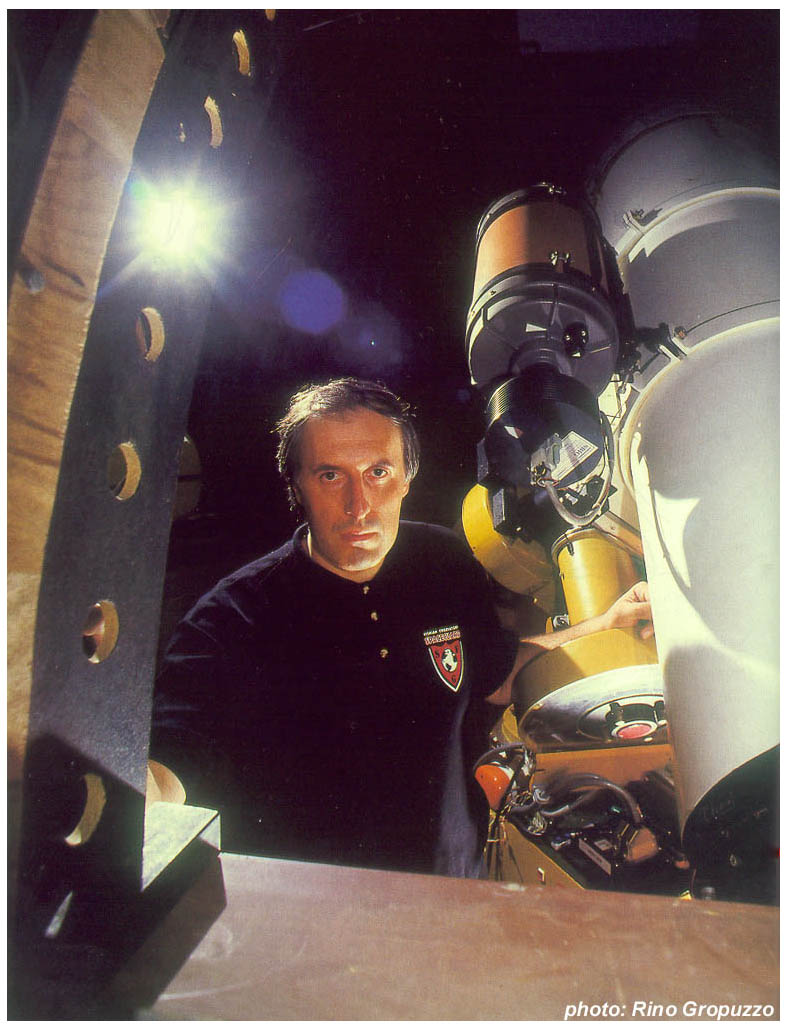
Korado Korlević

Korado Korlević (born 19 September 1958 in Poreč) is a Croatian teacher and prolific amateur astronomer, who ranks among the world's top 20 discoverers of minor planets. As of 2016, he is credited by the Minor Planet Center with the discovery of 1162 numbered minor planets he made at Višnjan Observatory during 1996–2001. In addition, he is credited with the co-discovery of another 132 minor planets. His discoveries include the slowly-rotating outer main-belt asteroid 10415 Mali Lošinj, and 10645 Brač, a member of the Eunomia family of asteroids. He has also discovered two comets, namely 183P/Korlević-Jurić and 203P/Korlević.

== Career ==
Minor planets discovered: 1295
see § List of discovered minor planets

Korlević became active in astronomy during his college years in Pula, where he became active within a local amateur astronomical society. He spent the next few years honing his art, by making telescopes and teaching others, including teaching posts at the Amateur Astronomical Society of Višnjan. In 1981 Korlević was qualified with a B.Sc. from the pedagogical faculty of Rijeka. Towards the end of the 1980s, after some time teaching at polytechnic schools, he co-founded the Yugoslav School of Astronomy, later known as the Višnjan School of Astronomy.

Within this organisation he was able to study meteors and asteroids more seriously, and played a central role in the forming of the International Meteor Organization as the organization formed. Korlević participated in the first International Tunguska Expedition. Motivated by new lines of research raise by this expedition, Korlević set about replacing the Višnjan Observatory's telescope, which had been badly damaged during the Serbian attack to Croatia. In particular, the telescope was sent to Sarajevo to help the defenders during the Siege of Sarajevo. In 1995 this new telescope produced the first astrometric line, and soon Korlević and his colleagues had discovered previously undiscovered asteroids, a big breakthrough for Croatian astronomy.

The Višnjan team have built a new observatory some 4 km away in Tićan to continue their work on Near Earth Objects (NEO). On the Tićan site they have also built the world's largest Schumann Antenna. They'll use this to prove that meteors penetrating the ionosphere have a significant effect on Schumann resonances.

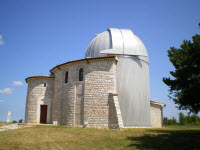
Tićan Observatory

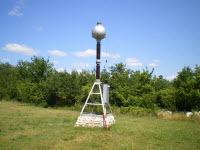
Schumann Antenna

== Korlević the Educator ==
Korado Korlević was the editor of Nebeske krijesnice, an astronomy newsletter, and an often-quoted expert for astronomical articles on the topic of small bodies and impact. The teaching of astronomy, and passing his enthusiasm for it onto younger generations, is still a central priority for Korlević, and he spends much time teaching.

== Affiliations ==
Korlević is a member of the following organisations:

- International Meteor Organization
- The Planetary Society
- Spaceguard Foundation
- Astronomical Society of the Pacific
- European Council for High Ability (ECHA)
- National Geographic Society
- Croatian entomological society
- Lions International

== Awards and honours ==
- Municipality of Višnjan-Visignano Award 2016 - "for his contributions to education, society and astronomy"
- Poreč city prize "San Mauro" — "for educational achievements"
- The asteroid 10201 Korado was named after him for his contributions to education, society and astronomy
- Edgar Wilson Award 1999 — "for comet discovery"
- Edgar Wilson Award 2000 — "for comet discovery"
- Ivan Filipović Award 2002 — Croatian Ministry of Education

== List of discovered minor planets ==
7364 Otonkučera	22 May 1996	list
9244 Višnjan	21 April 1998	list^{[A]}
9657 Učka	24 February 1996	list^{[B]}
9813 Rozgaj	13 October 1998	list
9814 Ivobenko	23 October 1998	list
10175 Aenona	14 February 1996	list^{[B]}
10241 Miličević	9 January 1999	list
10415 Mali Lošinj	23 October 1998	list
10421 Dalmatin	9 January 1999	list
10423 Dajčić	16 January 1999	list
10645 Brač	14 March 1999	list
11191 Paskvić	15 December 1998	list
11194 Mirna	16 December 1998	list
11400 Raša	15 January 1999	list
11406 Ucciocontin	15 February 1999	list
11604 Novigrad	21 October 1995	list^{[C]}
11706 Rijeka	20 April 1998	list^{[D]}
12124 Hvar	6 September 1999	list
12512 Split	21 April 1998	list^{[D]}
12568 Kuffner	11 November 1998	list
12584 Zeljkoandreic	12 September 1999	list
(12917) 1998 TG_{16}	13 October 1998	list
(12918) 1998 UF_{21}	29 October 1998	list
(12930) 1999 TJ_{6}	2 October 1999	list^{[E]}
(13356) 1998 TX_{17}	14 October 1998	list

(13359) 1998 UC_{4}	20 October 1998	list
(13360) 1998 UD_{8}	23 October 1998	list
(13362) 1998 UQ_{16}	26 October 1998	list
(13363) 1998 UR_{16}	26 October 1998	list
(13394) 1999 RL_{31}	9 September 1999	list
13408 Deadoklestic	10 October 1999	list^{[E]}
(13409) 1999 US	16 October 1999	list
(13418) 1999 VO_{9}	8 November 1999	list
(13422) 1999 VM_{19}	10 November 1999	list
(13773) 1998 TY_{17}	14 October 1998	list
(13778) 1998 US_{7}	22 October 1998	list
(13779) 1998 UY_{7}	23 October 1998	list
(13781) 1998 UO_{15}	23 October 1998	list
(13784) 1998 UN_{20}	23 October 1998	list
(13785) 1998 UR_{20}	29 October 1998	list
(13786) 1998 UV_{20}	29 October 1998	list
(13794) 1998 VD_{5}	11 November 1998	list
(13821) 1999 VE_{8}	8 November 1999	list
(13828) 1999 WL_{6}	28 November 1999	list
(13829) 1999 WK_{18}	29 November 1999	list
(14162) 1998 TV_{1}	14 October 1998	list
(14166) 1998 UZ_{6}	21 October 1998	list
(14168) 1998 UR_{15}	23 October 1998	list
(14187) 1998 XS_{9}	14 December 1998	list
(14215) 1999 TV_{6}	6 October 1999	list^{[E]}

(14222) 1999 WS_{1}	25 November 1999	list
(14241) 2000 AO_{5}	5 January 2000	list
(14246) 2000 AN_{50}	6 January 2000	list
(14280) 2000 CN_{72}	6 February 2000	list
(14615) 1998 TR_{5}	13 October 1998	list
(14618) 1998 UK_{7}	22 October 1998	list
(14620) 1998 UP_{15}	23 October 1998	list
(14636) 1998 VD_{44}	15 November 1998	list
(14645) 1998 XR_{9}	14 December 1998	list
(14657) 1998 YU_{27}	26 December 1998	list
(14658) 1999 AC_{10}	13 January 1999	list
(14660) 1999 BO_{1}	16 January 1999	list
(14661) 1999 BH_{10}	23 January 1999	list
(14675) 1999 VS_{7}	7 November 1999	list
(14676) 1999 WW_{7}	29 November 1999	list
(14687) 1999 YR_{13}	30 December 1999	list^{[E]}
(14729) 2000 DK_{16}	29 February 2000	list
(15027) 1998 UF_{8}	23 October 1998	list
(15029) 1998 VC_{5}	11 November 1998	list
(15044) 1998 XY_{16}	15 December 1998	list
(15055) 1998 YS_{9}	25 December 1998	list^{[E]}
(15059) 1998 YL_{27}	25 December 1998	list
(15060) 1999 AD	5 January 1999	list
(15061) 1999 AL	6 January 1999	list
(15065) 1999 AJ_{4}	9 January 1999	list

(15069) 1999 AU_{21}	15 January 1999	list
(15073) 1999 BK_{13}	25 January 1999	list
(15075) 1999 BF_{15}	24 January 1999	list
(15079) 1999 CO_{16}	15 February 1999	list
(15121) 2000 EN_{14}	5 March 2000	list
(15429) 1998 UA_{23}	30 October 1998	list
(15432) 1998 VA_{5}	11 November 1998	list
(15441) 1998 WJ_{9}	27 November 1998	list
(15458) 1998 YW_{9}	25 December 1998	list^{[E]}
(15459) 1998 YY_{9}	25 December 1998	list^{[E]}
(15470) 1999 BS	16 January 1999	list
(15472) 1999 BR_{5}	20 January 1999	list
(15473) 1999 BL_{9}	23 January 1999	list
(15498) 1999 EQ_{4}	13 March 1999	list
(15542) 2000 DN_{3}	28 February 2000	list^{[E]}
(15590) 2000 GH_{82}	7 April 2000	list
(15615) 2000 HU_{1}	25 April 2000	list
(15990) 1998 YT_{1}	17 December 1998	list
(15994) 1998 YO_{8}	23 December 1998	list
(15995) 1998 YQ_{9}	25 December 1998	list^{[E]}
(15999) 1999 AG_{7}	9 January 1999	list
(16001) 1999 AY21	15 January 1999	list
(16004) 1999 BZ_{3}	20 January 1999	list
(16005) 1999 BP_{7}	21 January 1999	list
(16006) 1999 BJ_{9}	22 January 1999	list

(16010) 1999 CG_{14}	13 February 1999	list
(16011) 1999 CM_{16}	6 February 1999	list
(16033) 1999 FT_{32}	24 March 1999	list
(16082) 1999 TR_{5}	2 October 1999	list^{[E]}
(16098) 1999 VR_{9}	9 November 1999	list
(16109) 1999 WH_{6}	28 November 1999	list
(16153) 2000 AB	1 January 2000	list
(16201) 2000 CK_{1}	4 February 2000	list
(16204) 2000 CT_{33}	4 February 2000	list
(16205) 2000 CC_{34}	4 February 2000	list
(16968) 1998 TT_{5}	13 October 1998	list
(16976) 1999 AC_{2}	6 January 1999	list
(16983) 1999 AQ_{21}	14 January 1999	list
(16987) 1999 BN_{13}	25 January 1999	list
(16991) 1999 CW_{4}	12 February 1999	list
(16994) 1999 CJ_{14}	13 February 1999	list
(16995) 1999 CX_{14}	15 February 1999	list
(17054) 1999 GL_{2}	6 April 1999	list
(17057) 1999 GS_{4}	10 April 1999	list
(17082) 1999 JC_{3}	9 May 1999	list
(17229) 2000 CR_{97}	13 February 2000	list
(17237) 2000 EC_{50}	7 March 2000	list
(17876) 1999 AX_{21}	15 January 1999	list
(17915) 1999 GU	5 April 1999	list
(18070) 2000 AC_{205}	13 January 2000	list

(18173) 2000 QD_{8}	25 August 2000	list^{[E]}
(18748) 1999 GV	5 April 1999	list
(18758) 1999 HD_{2}	19 April 1999	list^{[E]}
(18811) 1999 KJ_{1}	18 May 1999	list
(18844) 1999 RU_{27}	8 September 1999	list
(18847) 1999 RJ_{32}	9 September 1999	list
(18884) 1999 YE_{9}	30 December 1999	list
(18899) 2000 JQ_{2}	3 May 2000	list
(18995) 2000 RF_{53}	5 September 2000	list
(18999) 2000 RC_{60}	8 September 2000	list
(19014) 2000 RW_{77}	9 September 2000	list
(19015) 2000 RX_{77}	9 September 2000	list
(19580) 1999 ND	4 July 1999	list
(19583) 1999 NT_{4}	12 July 1999	list
(19622) 1999 RY_{2}	6 September 1999	list
(19697) 1999 SY_{3}	29 September 1999	list
(19698) 1999 SR_{4}	29 September 1999	list
(19705) 1999 TR_{10}	7 October 1999	list^{[E]}
(19706) 1999 TU_{11}	10 October 1999	list^{[E]}
(19714) 1999 UD	16 October 1999	list
(19729) 1999 XZ_{15}	6 December 1999	list
(19782) 2000 QT_{68}	30 August 2000	list
(19805) 2000 SR_{11}	24 September 2000	list
(20422) 1998 UE_{8}	23 October 1998	list
(20431) 1999 AA_{10}	13 January 1999	list

(20434) 1999 FM_{10}	21 March 1999	list
(20498) 1999 RT_{1}	5 September 1999	list
(20499) 1999 RZ_{2}	6 September 1999	list
(20511) 1999 RJ_{31}	8 September 1999	list
(20514) 1999 RD_{34}	7 September 1999	list
(20515) 1999 RO_{34}	11 September 1999	list
(20516) 1999 RP_{34}	11 September 1999	list
(20519) 1999 RH_{36}	12 September 1999	list
(20520) 1999 RC_{38}	13 September 1999	list
(20521) 1999 RM_{38}	13 September 1999	list
(20523) 1999 RZ_{41}	13 September 1999	list
(20525) 1999 RU_{43}	14 September 1999	list
(20615) 1999 SZ_{3}	29 September 1999	list
(20659) 1999 UE	16 October 1999	list
(20660) 1999 UF	16 October 1999	list
(20661) 1999 UZ	16 October 1999	list
(20662) 1999 UC_{1}	16 October 1999	list
(20667) 1999 UM_{11}	27 October 1999	list
(20668) 1999 UN_{11}	27 October 1999	list
(20677) 1999 VT_{7}	7 November 1999	list
(20678) 1999 VE_{9}	8 November 1999	list
(21591) 1998 TA_{6}	15 October 1998	list
(21594) 1998 VP_{31}	13 November 1998	list
(21598) 1998 WP_{9}	28 November 1998	list
(21600) 1998 XL_{5}	7 December 1998	list

(21604) 1999 BS_{3}	19 January 1999	list
(21624) 1999 NA_{1}	11 July 1999	list
(21666) 1999 RW_{1}	5 September 1999	list
(21667) 1999 RB_{3}	6 September 1999	list
(21681) 1999 RN_{32}	9 September 1999	list
(21689) 1999 RL_{38}	13 September 1999	list
(21691) 1999 RC_{42}	13 September 1999	list
(21784) 1999 SO_{1}	17 September 1999	list
(21786) 1999 SB_{4}	29 September 1999	list
(21787) 1999 SG_{4}	29 September 1999	list
(21800) 1999 TM_{1}	1 October 1999	list
(21803) 1999 TC_{7}	6 October 1999	list^{[E]}
(21805) 1999 TQ_{9}	8 October 1999	list^{[E]}
(21806) 1999 TE_{14}	10 October 1999	list^{[E]}
(21807) 1999 TH_{14}	10 October 1999	list^{[E]}
(21870) 1999 UD_{1}	16 October 1999	list
(21871) 1999 UK_{2}	17 October 1999	list
(21895) 1999 VA_{5}	5 November 1999	list
(21897) 1999 VG_{7}	7 November 1999	list
(21898) 1999 VJ_{7}	7 November 1999	list
(21908) 1999 VQ_{21}	12 November 1999	list
(21909) 1999 VR_{21}	12 November 1999	list
(22050) 1999 YV_{13}	31 December 1999	list
(22179) 2000 YY	17 December 2000	list
(22742) 1998 TX_{5}	15 October 1998	list

(22746) 1998 UC_{7}	22 October 1998	list
(22747) 1998 UD_{7}	22 October 1998	list
(22749) 1998 UF_{19}	27 October 1998	list
(22750) 1998 US_{20}	29 October 1998	list
(22755) 1998 WO_{9}	28 November 1998	list
(22766) 1999 AE_{7}	9 January 1999	list
(22767) 1999 AL_{21}	14 January 1999	list
(22781) 1999 GN_{4}	10 April 1999	list
(22792) 1999 NU	7 July 1999	list
(22804) 1999 RZ_{1}	6 September 1999	list
(22820) 1999 RM_{31}	9 September 1999	list
(22822) 1999 RT_{35}	12 September 1999	list
(22823) 1999 RN_{38}	13 September 1999	list
(22826) 1999 RR_{42}	14 September 1999	list
(22887) 1999 SX_{3}	29 September 1999	list
(22888) 1999 SL_{4}	29 September 1999	list
(22894) 1999 TW	1 October 1999	list
(22896) 1999 TU_{6}	6 October 1999	list^{[E]}
(22897) 1999 TH_{7}	6 October 1999	list^{[E]}
22899 Alconrad	11 October 1999	list^{[E]}
(22902) 1999 TH_{17}	15 October 1999	list
(22960) 1999 UE_{4}	27 October 1999	list
(22968) 1999 VB_{5}	5 November 1999	list
(22974) 1999 VN_{21}	12 November 1999	list
(23020) 1999 WY_{2}	27 November 1999	list

(23023) 1999 WA_{7}	28 November 1999	list
(23024) 1999 WM_{7}	28 November 1999	list
(23034) 1999 XJ_{15}	5 December 1999	list
(23050) 1999 XJ_{36}	6 December 1999	list
(23156) 2000 DM_{3}	28 February 2000	list^{[E]}
(23196) 2000 RY_{59}	5 September 2000	list
(23934) 1998 TN_{5}	13 October 1998	list
(23935) 1998 TU_{6}	13 October 1998	list
(23936) 1998 TV_{6}	13 October 1998	list
(23941) 1998 UW_{1}	16 October 1998	list
(23942) 1998 UX_{1}	16 October 1998	list
(23967) 1998 XQ_{12}	14 December 1998	list
(23971) 1998 YU_{9}	25 December 1998	list^{[E]}
(23991) 1999 RD_{3}	6 September 1999	list
(23996) 1999 RT_{27}	8 September 1999	list
(23997) 1999 RW_{27}	8 September 1999	list
(24001) 1999 RK_{34}	10 September 1999	list
(24002) 1999 RR_{35}	11 September 1999	list
(24003) 1999 RG_{36}	12 September 1999	list
(24034) 1999 SF_{2}	22 September 1999	list
(24035) 1999 SJ_{2}	22 September 1999	list
(24036) 1999 SP_{4}	29 September 1999	list
(24049) 1999 TZ_{18}	15 October 1999	list
(24086) 1999 UT	16 October 1999	list
(24098) 1999 VC_{7}	7 November 1999	list

(24099) 1999 VF_{8}	8 November 1999	list
(24100) 1999 VH_{8}	8 November 1999	list
(24163) 1999 WT_{1}	25 November 1999	list
(24266) 1999 XE_{144}	13 December 1999	list
(24309) 1999 YF_{9}	31 December 1999	list
(24416) 2000 BF_{2}	25 January 2000	list
(24435) 2000 DN	23 February 2000	list
(24519) 2001 CH	1 February 2001	list
(25219) 1998 TM_{5}	13 October 1998	list
(25238) 1998 UJ_{7}	21 October 1998	list
(25239) 1998 UB_{8}	23 October 1998	list
(25243) 1998 UQ_{15}	23 October 1998	list
(25244) 1998 UV_{15}	24 October 1998	list
(25245) 1998 UW_{18}	26 October 1998	list
(25246) 1998 UX_{18}	26 October 1998	list
(25247) 1998 UW_{19}	23 October 1998	list
(25248) 1998 UX_{19}	24 October 1998	list
(25287) 1998 WR_{9}	28 November 1998	list
(25319) 1999 CT_{14}	15 February 1999	list
(25324) 1999 GQ_{4}	10 April 1999	list
(25341) 1999 RT_{38}	13 September 1999	list
(25342) 1999 RQ_{42}	14 September 1999	list
(25343) 1999 RA_{44}	15 September 1999	list
(25359) 1999 TW_{11}	10 October 1999	list^{[E]}
(25360) 1999 TK_{14}	10 October 1999	list^{[E]}

(25387) 1999 UN_{3}	16 October 1999	list
(25433) 1999 WM_{2}	26 November 1999	list
(25439) 1999 WV_{6}	28 November 1999	list
(25440) 1999 WR_{7}	28 November 1999	list
(25444) 1999 WL_{13}	29 November 1999	list
(25460) 1999 XX_{15}	6 December 1999	list
(25530) 1999 XQ_{127}	6 December 1999	list
(25600) 2000 AS_{1}	2 January 2000	list
(25603) 2000 AR_{4}	2 January 2000	list
(25626) 2000 AD_{50}	5 January 2000	list
(25777) 2000 CE_{34}	4 February 2000	list
(25917) 2001 DT_{6}	17 February 2001	list
(26315) 1998 UF_{4}	21 October 1998	list
(26318) 1998 UC_{20}	28 October 1998	list
(26341) 1998 XK_{9}	9 December 1998	list
(26365) 1999 AK_{21}	14 January 1999	list
(26366) 1999 AM_{21}	14 January 1999	list
(26391) 1999 VN_{9}	8 November 1999	list
(26405) 1999 XS_{15}	5 December 1999	list
(26439) 2000 AZ_{1}	2 January 2000	list
(26494) 2000 BR_{22}	26 January 2000	list
(26496) 2000 CE_{1}	4 February 2000	list
(26509) 2000 CJ_{34}	5 February 2000	list
(26521) 2000 CS_{76}	10 February 2000	list
(26536) 2000 DL_{3}	27 February 2000	list^{[E]}

(27078) 1998 TC_{6}	15 October 1998	list
(27080) 1998 TH_{16}	14 October 1998	list
(27081) 1998 TK_{16}	15 October 1998	list
(27089) 1998 UE_{15}	23 October 1998	list
(27092) 1998 UY_{22}	30 October 1998	list
(27093) 1998 UB_{23}	30 October 1998	list
(27133) 1998 XQ_{9}	14 December 1998	list
(27151) 1998 YT_{3}	17 December 1998	list
(27157) 1998 YK_{27}	25 December 1998	list
(27159) 1999 AA_{2}	6 January 1999	list
(27163) 1999 AA_{7}	9 January 1999	list
(27164) 1999 AH_{7}	9 January 1999	list
(27165) 1999 AM_{7}	10 January 1999	list
(27167) 1999 AH_{21}	14 January 1999	list
(27168) 1999 AN_{21}	14 January 1999	list
(27176) 1999 BR_{3}	19 January 1999	list
(27177) 1999 BU_{3}	19 January 1999	list
(27179) 1999 BJ_{10}	23 January 1999	list
(27228) 1999 JG_{11}	9 May 1999	list
(27315) 2000 BC	16 January 2000	list
(27376) 2000 EB_{50}	7 March 2000	list
(28143) 1998 TK_{5}	13 October 1998	list
(28153) 1998 UU_{20}	29 October 1998	list
(28198) 1998 XU_{16}	15 December 1998	list
(28216) 1998 YU_{1}	17 December 1998	list

(28218) 1998 YA_{6}	17 December 1998	list
(28219) 1998 YP_{8}	23 December 1998	list
(28224) 1999 AJ	5 January 1999	list
(28229) 1999 AK_{4}	9 January 1999	list
(28236) 1999 AH_{10}	14 January 1999	list
(28240) 1999 AP_{21}	14 January 1999	list
(28246) 1999 BW_{1}	18 January 1999	list
(28247) 1999 BP_{3}	19 January 1999	list
(28250) 1999 BC_{8}	22 January 1999	list
(28252) 1999 BK_{15}	26 January 1999	list
(28262) 1999 CQ_{4}	8 February 1999	list
(28263) 1999 CR_{4}	8 February 1999	list
(28269) 1999 CQ_{14}	15 February 1999	list
(28270) 1999 CS_{14}	15 February 1999	list
(28271) 1999 CK_{16}	6 February 1999	list
(28375) 1999 JC	2 May 1999	list
(28403) 1999 TY	1 October 1999	list
(28404) 1999 TQ_{5}	1 October 1999	list^{[E]}
(28500) 2000 CW_{76}	10 February 2000	list
(28515) 2000 DK_{3}	27 February 2000	list^{[E]}
(28520) 2000 DH_{16}	29 February 2000	list
(28545) 2000 ED_{20}	7 March 2000	list
(28546) 2000 EE_{20}	7 March 2000	list
(28580) 2000 EJ_{104}	14 March 2000	list
(28754) 2000 HV_{1}	25 April 2000	list

(28933) 2000 SZ_{22}	25 September 2000	list
(28940) 2000 UD_{1}	22 October 2000	list
(29629) 1998 UP_{16}	26 October 1998	list
(29652) 1998 WD_{9}	26 November 1998	list
(29653) 1998 WG_{9}	27 November 1998	list
(29666) 1998 WC_{31}	28 November 1998	list
(29671) 1998 XX_{8}	9 December 1998	list
(29693) 1998 YC	16 December 1998	list
(29694) 1998 YG	16 December 1998	list
(29695) 1998 YH	16 December 1998	list
(29697) 1998 YR_{1}	16 December 1998	list
(29712) 1999 AX_{6}	9 January 1999	list
(29713) 1999 AK_{7}	10 January 1999	list
(29714) 1999 AL_{7}	10 January 1999	list
(29734) 1999 BP_{5}	21 January 1999	list
(29741) 1999 BM_{10}	24 January 1999	list
(29743) 1999 BM_{15}	26 January 1999	list
(29759) 1999 CR_{8}	12 February 1999	list
(29830) 1999 ER_{4}	14 March 1999	list
(29833) 1999 FJ	16 March 1999	list^{[E]}
(30023) 2000 DN_{16}	29 February 2000	list
(30026) 2000 DS_{29}	29 February 2000	list
(30045) 2000 EC_{20}	6 March 2000	list
(30237) 2000 HY_{1}	25 April 2000	list
(30309) 2000 JR_{2}	3 May 2000	list

(31355) 1998 TT_{6}	15 October 1998	list
(31357) 1998 UP_{20}	28 October 1998	list
(31394) 1998 YX_{9}	25 December 1998	list^{[E]}
(31401) 1999 AK	6 January 1999	list
(31413) 1999 AR_{21}	15 January 1999	list
(31427) 1999 BS_{5}	20 January 1999	list
(31430) 1999 BX_{8}	22 January 1999	list
(31432) 1999 BY_{12}	24 January 1999	list
(31433) 1999 BA_{13}	24 January 1999	list
(31434) 1999 BQ_{13}	25 January 1999	list
(31436) 1999 BJ_{15}	26 January 1999	list
(31440) 1999 BD_{26}	25 January 1999	list
(31447) 1999 CB_{8}	12 February 1999	list
(31454) 1999 CH_{14}	13 February 1999	list
(31455) 1999 CU_{14}	15 February 1999	list
(31456) 1999 CV_{14}	15 February 1999	list
(31457) 1999 CW_{14}	15 February 1999	list
(31537) 1999 DZ	18 February 1999	list
(31587) 1999 FQ_{32}	23 March 1999	list
(31601) 1999 GF	3 April 1999	list
(31602) 1999 GG	3 April 1999	list
(31611) 1999 GF_{6}	13 April 1999	list
(31612) 1999 GG_{6}	13 April 1999	list
(31842) 2000 CF_{77}	10 February 2000	list
(31855) 2000 EA_{50}	6 March 2000	list

(31990) 2000 HX_{34}	26 April 2000	list
(33362) 1999 BP_{1}	16 January 1999	list
(33364) 1999 BX_{5}	20 January 1999	list
(33367) 1999 BD_{8}	22 January 1999	list
(33368) 1999 BD_{9}	22 January 1999	list
(33374) 1999 CE_{2}	6 February 1999	list
(33428) 1999 DO_{3}	18 February 1999	list^{[E]}
(33429) 1999 DL_{4}	23 February 1999	list^{[E]}
(33465) 1999 FP_{32}	23 March 1999	list
(33475) 1999 FK_{53}	28 March 1999	list
(33479) 1999 GO	5 April 1999	list
(33482) 1999 GO_{4}	10 April 1999	list
(33531) 1999 HG_{2}	20 April 1999	list^{[E]}
(33548) 1999 JC_{13}	10 May 1999	list
(33705) 1999 LJ	5 June 1999	list
(33724) 1999 NW_{4}	12 July 1999	list
(33795) 1999 TR_{6}	6 October 1999	list^{[E]}
(34124) 2000 QS	22 August 2000	list^{[E]}
(34136) 2000 QF_{6}	24 August 2000	list^{[E]}
(34171) 2000 QZ_{34}	26 August 2000	list^{[E]}
(34427) 2000 SN_{23}	26 September 2000	list
(34605) 2000 US	21 October 2000	list
(34606) 2000 UT	21 October 2000	list
(34612) 2000 UN_{13}	23 October 2000	list
(35680) 1999 AS_{21}	15 January 1999	list

(35687) 1999 CP_{8}	6 February 1999	list
(35701) 1999 FF_{7}	16 March 1999	list
(35726) 1999 GW	5 April 1999	list
(35762) 1999 HF_{2}	20 April 1999	list^{[E]}
(35776) 1999 JE_{11}	9 May 1999	list
(35777) 1999 JB_{13}	10 May 1999	list
(35961) 1999 LH_{7}	12 June 1999	list
(35983) 1999 NG_{5}	15 July 1999	list
(36032) 1999 OC	16 July 1999	list
(36058) 1999 RM_{35}	10 September 1999	list
(36173) 1999 SN_{1}	17 September 1999	list
(36176) 1999 SR_{9}	29 September 1999	list
(36181) 1999 TT_{10}	8 October 1999	list^{[E]}
(36238) 1999 VX_{19}	8 November 1999	list
(36286) 2000 EL_{14}	5 March 2000	list
(36456) 2000 QC_{8}	25 August 2000	list^{[E]}
(36457) 2000 QF_{8}	25 August 2000	list^{[E]}
(36458) 2000 QO_{8}	25 August 2000	list^{[E]}
(36508) 2000 QP_{68}	27 August 2000	list
(36589) 2000 QS_{129}	30 August 2000	list
(36762) 2000 RU_{78}	10 September 2000	list
(36792) 2000 SC_{23}	25 September 2000	list
(36797) 2000 SK_{42}	25 September 2000	list
(37021) 2000 UB_{1}	21 October 2000	list
(37023) 2000 UD_{2}	22 October 2000	list

(38051) 1998 XJ_{5}	7 December 1998	list
(38054) 1999 AG_{10}	14 January 1999	list
(38057) 1999 BO_{15}	26 January 1999	list
(38063) 1999 FH	16 March 1999	list^{[E]}
(38069) 1999 GN	5 April 1999	list
(38096) 1999 JF_{11}	9 May 1999	list
(38204) 1999 MT	16 June 1999	list
(38211) 1999 NV_{4}	12 July 1999	list
(38272) 1999 RW_{41}	13 September 1999	list
(38273) 1999 RN_{42}	14 September 1999	list
(38274) 1999 RR_{44}	14 September 1999	list
(38439) 1999 SQ_{4}	29 September 1999	list
(38451) 1999 TU	1 October 1999	list
(38452) 1999 TE_{1}	1 October 1999	list
(38453) 1999 TU_{1}	1 October 1999	list
(38456) 1999 TO_{6}	6 October 1999	list^{[E]}
(38457) 1999 TJ_{9}	7 October 1999	list^{[E]}
(38460) 1999 TH_{13}	7 October 1999	list^{[E]}
(38542) 1999 VD_{7}	7 November 1999	list
(38544) 1999 VS_{21}	12 November 1999	list
(38579) 1999 XM_{15}	5 December 1999	list
(38606) 1999 YC_{13}	31 December 1999	list
(38723) 2000 QT_{129}	30 August 2000	list
(38837) 2000 SM_{23}	26 September 2000	list
(38977) 2000 UV	21 October 2000	list

(38978) 2000 UA_{2}	22 October 2000	list
(38979) 2000 UB_{2}	22 October 2000	list
(40235) 1998 UX_{7}	23 October 1998	list
(40266) 1999 GS	5 April 1999	list
(40334) 1999 NS_{4}	11 July 1999	list
(40335) 1999 NJ_{5}	15 July 1999	list
(40404) 1999 OB	16 July 1999	list
(40429) 1999 RL_{27}	7 September 1999	list
(40434) 1999 RH_{32}	9 September 1999	list
(40435) 1999 RL_{32}	9 September 1999	list
(40439) 1999 RF_{34}	9 September 1999	list
(40442) 1999 RO_{35}	11 September 1999	list
(40448) 1999 RT_{37}	12 September 1999	list
(40449) 1999 RV_{37}	12 September 1999	list
(40450) 1999 RX_{37}	12 September 1999	list
(40451) 1999 RD_{38}	13 September 1999	list
(40456) 1999 RV_{41}	13 September 1999	list
(40458) 1999 RH_{43}	14 September 1999	list
(40460) 1999 RV_{43}	15 September 1999	list
(40461) 1999 RW_{43}	15 September 1999	list
(40465) 1999 RQ_{44}	14 September 1999	list
(40744) 1999 TG_{1}	1 October 1999	list
(40748) 1999 TO_{5}	1 October 1999	list^{[E]}
(40749) 1999 TP_{6}	6 October 1999	list^{[E]}
(40750) 1999 TA_{7}	6 October 1999	list^{[E]}

(40751) 1999 TD_{7}	6 October 1999	list^{[E]}
(40752) 1999 TO_{7}	7 October 1999	list^{[E]}
(40753) 1999 TK_{8}	6 October 1999	list^{[E]}
(40754) 1999 TM_{8}	6 October 1999	list^{[E]}
(40755) 1999 TO_{8}	6 October 1999	list^{[E]}
(40756) 1999 TQ_{8}	7 October 1999	list^{[E]}
(40762) 1999 TL_{14}	11 October 1999	list^{[E]}
(40766) 1999 TB_{17}	14 October 1999	list
(40767) 1999 TC_{17}	14 October 1999	list
(40989) 1999 UO	16 October 1999	list
(40990) 1999 UW	16 October 1999	list
(40991) 1999 UA_{1}	16 October 1999	list
(40993) 1999 UF_{2}	16 October 1999	list
(41043) 1999 VW_{4}	5 November 1999	list
(41047) 1999 VP_{7}	7 November 1999	list
(41048) 1999 VQ_{7}	7 November 1999	list
(41050) 1999 VF_{9}	8 November 1999	list
(41055) 1999 VD_{20}	10 November 1999	list
(41200) 1999 WA_{3}	27 November 1999	list
(41202) 1999 WX_{6}	28 November 1999	list
(41203) 1999 WK_{7}	28 November 1999	list
(41425) 2000 CE_{77}	10 February 2000	list
(41554) 2000 RH_{53}	5 September 2000	list
(41559) 2000 RD_{60}	8 September 2000	list
(41581) 2000 SY_{22}	25 September 2000	list

(41675) 2000 UZ_{1}	22 October 2000	list
(42770) 1998 TH_{5}	13 October 1998	list
(42773) 1998 UN_{15}	23 October 1998	list
(42774) 1998 UZ_{20}	29 October 1998	list
(42818) 1999 NU_{4}	12 July 1999	list
(42819) 1999 NF_{5}	15 July 1999	list
(42848) 1999 RT_{43}	13 September 1999	list
(42918) 1999 SK_{4}	29 September 1999	list
(42919) 1999 SS_{4}	29 September 1999	list
(42926) 1999 TJ_{7}	6 October 1999	list^{[E]}
(42931) 1999 TG_{17}	15 October 1999	list
(43022) 1999 VR_{7}	7 November 1999	list
(43086) 1999 WB_{7}	28 November 1999	list
(43099) 1999 XO_{15}	5 December 1999	list
(43100) 1999 XV_{15}	6 December 1999	list
(43332) 2000 QG_{6}	24 August 2000	list^{[E]}
(43490) 2001 CL	2 February 2001	list
(44427) 1998 TC_{5}	13 October 1998	list
(44428) 1998 TF_{5}	13 October 1998	list
(44429) 1998 TU_{5}	13 October 1998	list
(44434) 1998 UD_{4}	20 October 1998	list
(44435) 1998 UB_{7}	22 October 1998	list
(44436) 1998 UE_{7}	22 October 1998	list
(44437) 1998 UN_{7}	22 October 1998	list
(44438) 1998 UG_{8}	23 October 1998	list

(44440) 1998 UM_{15}	23 October 1998	list
(44441) 1998 UO_{16}	24 October 1998	list
(44443) 1998 UY_{19}	26 October 1998	list
(44444) 1998 UZ_{19}	26 October 1998	list
(44445) 1998 UX_{20}	29 October 1998	list
(44491) 1998 WU_{30}	28 November 1998	list
(44496) 1998 XM_{5}	8 December 1998	list
(44499) 1998 XV_{16}	15 December 1998	list
(44522) 1998 YP_{1}	16 December 1998	list
(44523) 1998 YR_{3}	16 December 1998	list
(44528) 1998 YZ_{6}	22 December 1998	list
(44533) 1998 YN_{9}	24 December 1998	list^{[E]}
(44534) 1998 YZ_{9}	25 December 1998	list^{[E]}
(44537) 1999 AG	5 January 1999	list
(44539) 1999 AH_{4}	9 January 1999	list
(44541) 1999 AV_{6}	9 January 1999	list
(44542) 1999 AD_{7}	9 January 1999	list
(44546) 1999 BR	16 January 1999	list
(44548) 1999 BQ_{5}	20 January 1999	list
(44549) 1999 BH_{13}	24 January 1999	list
(44599) 1999 RA_{2}	6 September 1999	list
(44612) 1999 RP_{27}	7 September 1999	list
(44614) 1999 RM_{34}	10 September 1999	list
(44615) 1999 RQ_{34}	11 September 1999	list
(44617) 1999 RY_{37}	12 September 1999	list

(44618) 1999 RO_{38}	13 September 1999	list
(44619) 1999 RO_{42}	14 September 1999	list
(44620) 1999 RS_{43}	12 September 1999	list
(44699) 1999 SG	16 September 1999	list
(44707) 1999 TR_{1}	1 October 1999	list
(44708) 1999 TS_{1}	1 October 1999	list
(44709) 1999 TV_{1}	1 October 1999	list
(44713) 1999 TP_{5}	1 October 1999	list^{[E]}
(44718) 1999 TP_{8}	7 October 1999	list^{[E]}
(44719) 1999 TP_{9}	8 October 1999	list^{[E]}
(44720) 1999 TS_{9}	8 October 1999	list^{[E]}
(44722) 1999 TQ_{10}	6 October 1999	list^{[E]}
(44726) 1999 TT_{14}	7 October 1999	list^{[E]}
(44729) 1999 TF_{17}	15 October 1999	list
(44849) 1999 UE_{1}	16 October 1999	list
(44851) 1999 UE_{2}	16 October 1999	list
(44852) 1999 UG_{2}	17 October 1999	list
(44887) 1999 VF_{5}	5 November 1999	list
(44890) 1999 VF_{7}	7 November 1999	list
(44891) 1999 VB_{8}	8 November 1999	list
(44892) 1999 VJ_{8}	8 November 1999	list
(44894) 1999 VK_{9}	8 November 1999	list
(44895) 1999 VL_{9}	8 November 1999	list
(44902) 1999 VJ_{19}	10 November 1999	list
(44904) 1999 VH_{21}	12 November 1999	list

(45021) 1999 WE_{6}	28 November 1999	list
(45022) 1999 WF_{6}	28 November 1999	list
(45023) 1999 WM_{6}	28 November 1999	list
(45024) 1999 WN_{7}	28 November 1999	list
(45025) 1999 WY_{7}	29 November 1999	list
(45031) 1999 WR_{13}	29 November 1999	list
(45260) 2000 AY_{1}	2 January 2000	list
(45264) 2000 AL_{5}	4 January 2000	list
(45306) 2000 AC_{50}	5 January 2000	list
(45307) 2000 AO_{50}	6 January 2000	list
(45499) 2000 BV_{2}	16 January 2000	list
(45540) 2000 CY_{33}	4 February 2000	list
(45577) 2000 CT_{76}	10 February 2000	list
(45589) 2000 CM_{97}	13 February 2000	list
(45599) 2000 DJ_{3}	27 February 2000	list^{[E]}
(45650) 2000 EV_{49}	6 March 2000	list
(46988) 1998 TJ_{5}	13 October 1998	list
(46989) 1998 TO_{5}	13 October 1998	list
(47003) 1998 UF_{7}	23 October 1998	list
(47004) 1998 UZ_{7}	23 October 1998	list
(47007) 1998 UL_{16}	23 October 1998	list
(47010) 1998 UD_{20}	28 October 1998	list
(47029) 1998 VO_{31}	12 November 1998	list
(47046) 1998 WM_{9}	26 November 1998	list
(47075) 1998 YB	16 December 1998	list

(47080) 1998 YA_{7}	22 December 1998	list
(47081) 1998 YV_{9}	25 December 1998	list^{[E]}
(47088) 1999 AB_{7}	9 January 1999	list
(47089) 1999 AC_{7}	9 January 1999	list
(47090) 1999 AJ_{7}	9 January 1999	list
(47092) 1999 AB_{10}	13 January 1999	list
(47093) 1999 AF_{21}	10 January 1999	list
(47094) 1999 AW_{21}	15 January 1999	list
(47100) 1999 BB_{10}	23 January 1999	list
(47102) 1999 BT_{12}	20 January 1999	list
(47149) 1999 RX_{34}	11 September 1999	list
(47150) 1999 RN_{35}	11 September 1999	list
(47159) 1999 SJ	16 September 1999	list
(47161) 1999 TH_{1}	1 October 1999	list
(47165) 1999 TM_{14}	11 October 1999	list^{[E]}
(47224) 1999 VG_{11}	8 November 1999	list
(47226) 1999 VE_{19}	8 November 1999	list
(47295) 1999 WV_{1}	25 November 1999	list
(47297) 1999 WN_{2}	26 November 1999	list
(47298) 1999 WX_{2}	27 November 1999	list
(47301) 1999 WA_{6}	28 November 1999	list
(47302) 1999 WG_{6}	28 November 1999	list
(47303) 1999 WU_{7}	29 November 1999	list
(47468) 1999 YS_{13}	30 December 1999	list
(47499) 2000 AH_{50}	5 January 2000	list

(47615) 2000 BT_{22}	27 January 2000	list
(47679) 2000 CN_{76}	10 February 2000	list
(47680) 2000 CC_{77}	10 February 2000	list
(47709) 2000 DC_{16}	28 February 2000	list
(47710) 2000 DJ_{16}	29 February 2000	list
(47711) 2000 DL_{16}	29 February 2000	list
(47776) 2000 EX	3 March 2000	list
(47800) 2000 ED_{50}	7 March 2000	list
(48021) 2001 DN_{6}	16 February 2001	list
(48641) 1995 UA_{1}	20 October 1995	list^{[C]}
(49242) 1998 TD_{5}	13 October 1998	list
(49243) 1998 TE_{5}	13 October 1998	list
(49244) 1998 TG_{5}	13 October 1998	list
(49245) 1998 TS_{5}	13 October 1998	list
(49246) 1998 TF_{6}	15 October 1998	list
(49251) 1998 TR_{17}	15 October 1998	list
(49268) 1998 UV_{7}	23 October 1998	list
(49269) 1998 UW_{7}	23 October 1998	list
(49273) 1998 UY_{18}	27 October 1998	list
(49274) 1998 UB_{20}	28 October 1998	list
(49275) 1998 UO_{20}	28 October 1998	list
(49276) 1998 UA_{21}	29 October 1998	list
(49281) 1998 UX_{22}	30 October 1998	list
(49332) 1998 VC_{44}	15 November 1998	list
(49351) 1998 WE_{9}	27 November 1998	list

(49352) 1998 WS_{9}	28 November 1998	list
(49432) 1998 YD	16 December 1998	list
(49446) 1998 YO_{9}	25 December 1998	list^{[E]}
(49462) 1999 AS_{6}	9 January 1999	list
(49463) 1999 AZ_{6}	9 January 1999	list
(49464) 1999 AO_{7}	11 January 1999	list
(49476) 1999 BA_{6}	21 January 1999	list
(49477) 1999 BA_{8}	21 January 1999	list
(49478) 1999 BY_{8}	22 January 1999	list
(49479) 1999 BH_{9}	22 January 1999	list
(49480) 1999 BX_{9}	23 January 1999	list
(49482) 1999 BV_{12}	24 January 1999	list
(49483) 1999 BP_{13}	25 January 1999	list
(49492) 1999 BC_{26}	19 January 1999	list
(49502) 1999 CK_{14}	15 February 1999	list
(49595) 1999 FG	16 March 1999	list^{[E]}
(49613) 1999 FS_{32}	23 March 1999	list
(49622) 1999 GO_{3}	9 April 1999	list
(49680) 1999 TN_{9}	7 October 1999	list^{[E]}
(49767) 1999 WK_{2}	26 November 1999	list
(49769) 1999 WZ_{6}	28 November 1999	list
(49770) 1999 WC_{7}	28 November 1999	list
(49771) 1999 WP_{7}	28 November 1999	list
(49772) 1999 WT_{7}	28 November 1999	list
(49775) 1999 WO_{13}	29 November 1999	list

(49776) 1999 WG_{18}	28 November 1999	list
(49789) 1999 XY_{15}	6 December 1999	list
(49981) 1999 YJ_{13}	30 December 1999	list
(49985) 2000 AX_{1}	2 January 2000	list
(49989) 2000 AJ_{5}	2 January 2000	list
(49990) 2000 AK_{5}	4 January 2000	list
(50035) 2000 AL_{50}	6 January 2000	list
(50236) 2000 BB_{3}	26 January 2000	list
(50272) 2000 CZ	3 February 2000	list
(50273) 2000 CA_{1}	3 February 2000	list
(50274) 2000 CN_{1}	4 February 2000	list
(50297) 2000 CS_{33}	4 February 2000	list
(50298) 2000 CA_{34}	4 February 2000	list
(50299) 2000 CD_{34}	4 February 2000	list
(50300) 2000 CF_{34}	5 February 2000	list
(50361) 2000 CE_{76}	5 February 2000	list
(50362) 2000 CB_{77}	10 February 2000	list
(50363) 2000 CD_{77}	10 February 2000	list
(50364) 2000 CG_{77}	10 February 2000	list
(50415) 2000 DL_{2}	24 February 2000	list^{[E]}
(50429) 2000 DB_{16}	28 February 2000	list
(50430) 2000 DG_{16}	29 February 2000	list
(50538) 2000 EA_{15}	3 March 2000	list
(50601) 2000 EY_{49}	6 March 2000	list
(50665) 2000 EK_{104}	14 March 2000	list

(51387) 2001 DU_{6}	17 February 2001	list
(52957) 1998 TW_{1}	14 October 1998	list
(52966) 1998 TQ_{17}	15 October 1998	list
(52977) 1998 UE_{4}	21 October 1998	list
(52978) 1998 UH_{7}	20 October 1998	list
(52979) 1998 UL_{7}	22 October 1998	list
(52980) 1998 UP_{7}	22 October 1998	list
(52981) 1998 UX_{15}	24 October 1998	list
(52985) 1998 UV_{19}	23 October 1998	list
(52986) 1998 UE_{21}	29 October 1998	list
(53033) 1998 WN_{9}	26 November 1998	list
(53103) 1999 AB_{2}	6 January 1999	list
(53106) 1999 AG_{4}	6 January 1999	list
(53121) 1999 AJ_{21}	14 January 1999	list
(53124) 1999 AC_{23}	14 January 1999	list
(53140) 1999 BT_{5}	20 January 1999	list
(53142) 1999 BR_{7}	21 January 1999	list
(53143) 1999 BB_{9}	22 January 1999	list
(53146) 1999 BG_{10}	23 January 1999	list
(53277) 1999 FU_{32}	24 March 1999	list
(53287) 1999 GR	5 April 1999	list
(53425) 1999 SO_{4}	29 September 1999	list
(53437) 1999 WL_{2}	26 November 1999	list
(53543) 2000 BD_{3}	26 January 2000	list
(53544) 2000 BF_{3}	27 January 2000	list

(53568) 2000 CB_{34}	4 February 2000	list
(53601) 2000 CK_{72}	4 February 2000	list
(53602) 2000 CL_{72}	6 February 2000	list
(53605) 2000 CY_{76}	10 February 2000	list
(53626) 2000 CE_{97}	11 February 2000	list
(53641) 2000 DD_{16}	28 February 2000	list
(53714) 2000 EY	5 March 2000	list
(53716) 2000 EU_{7}	2 March 2000	list
(54096) 2000 HX_{1}	25 April 2000	list
(54097) 2000 HZ_{1}	26 April 2000	list
(54532) 2000 QR_{35}	28 August 2000	list
(56012) 1998 UE_{19}	27 October 1998	list
(56013) 1998 UB_{21}	29 October 1998	list
(56066) 1998 YA	16 December 1998	list
(56089) 1999 AY_{25}	6 January 1999	list
(56094) 1999 BW_{5}	20 January 1999	list
(56096) 1999 BA_{9}	22 January 1999	list
(56098) 1999 BE_{13}	24 January 1999	list
(56099) 1999 BL_{13}	25 January 1999	list
(56102) 1999 BD_{15}	24 January 1999	list
(56118) 1999 CF_{14}	13 February 1999	list
(56165) 1999 EZ_{2}	8 March 1999	list
(56370) 2000 EV_{7}	2 March 2000	list
(56820) 2000 QK_{8}	26 August 2000	list^{[E]}
(56834) 2000 QO_{35}	28 August 2000	list

(59046) 1998 TW_{17}	13 October 1998	list
(59055) 1998 UQ_{7}	22 October 1998	list
(59056) 1998 UK_{16}	22 October 1998	list
(59058) 1998 UA_{19}	27 October 1998	list
(59059) 1998 UZ_{22}	30 October 1998	list
(59176) 1999 AP_{7}	11 January 1999	list
(59190) 1999 AZ_{21}	15 January 1999	list
(59194) 1999 BV_{1}	18 January 1999	list
(59198) 1999 BT_{3}	19 January 1999	list
(59200) 1999 BS_{7}	21 January 1999	list
(59201) 1999 BW_{7}	21 January 1999	list
(59202) 1999 BB_{8}	21 January 1999	list
(59203) 1999 BC_{9}	22 January 1999	list
(59204) 1999 BF_{9}	22 January 1999	list
(59205) 1999 BD_{10}	23 January 1999	list
(59206) 1999 BE_{10}	23 January 1999	list
(59208) 1999 BW_{12}	24 January 1999	list
(59209) 1999 BD_{13}	24 January 1999	list
(59210) 1999 BJ_{13}	25 January 1999	list
(59215) 1999 BC_{15}	21 January 1999	list
(59216) 1999 BG_{15}	25 January 1999	list
(59242) 1999 CS_{4}	12 February 1999	list
(59246) 1999 CQ_{8}	12 February 1999	list
(59402) 1999 FR_{32}	23 March 1999	list
(59416) 1999 GM	5 April 1999	list

(59424) 1999 GP_{4}	10 April 1999	list
(59474) 1999 HK_{2}	20 April 1999	list^{[E]}
(59475) 1999 HN_{2}	19 April 1999	list^{[E]}
(59506) 1999 JD_{11}	9 May 1999	list
(59729) 1999 LN	6 June 1999	list
(59762) 1999 NB_{1}	11 July 1999	list
(59824) 1999 RQ_{27}	7 September 1999	list
(59825) 1999 RV_{27}	8 September 1999	list
(59827) 1999 RF_{32}	9 September 1999	list
(59831) 1999 RR_{36}	11 September 1999	list
(59975) 1999 SE	16 September 1999	list
(59996) 1999 TZ	1 October 1999	list
(59997) 1999 TN_{1}	1 October 1999	list
(60003) 1999 TM_{7}	7 October 1999	list^{[E]}
(60005) 1999 TW_{15}	7 October 1999	list^{[E]}
(60149) 1999 UC_{2}	16 October 1999	list
(60179) 1999 VE_{7}	7 November 1999	list
(60180) 1999 VK_{8}	8 November 1999	list
(60185) 1999 VY_{21}	12 November 1999	list
(60437) 2000 CU_{76}	10 February 2000	list
(60515) 2000 EQ_{14}	5 March 2000	list
(60736) 2000 GJ_{82}	8 April 2000	list
(60789) 2000 HW_{1}	25 April 2000	list
(60805) 2000 HS_{23}	26 April 2000	list
(61471) 2000 QQ_{35}	28 August 2000	list

(61942) 2000 RP_{12}	2 September 2000	list
(62155) 2000 SD_{23}	25 September 2000	list
(62156) 2000 SL_{23}	26 September 2000	list
(62743) 2000 UA_{1}	21 October 2000	list
(62745) 2000 UY_{1}	21 October 2000	list
(62746) 2000 UE_{2}	22 October 2000	list
(62764) 2000 UL_{13}	23 October 2000	list
(66199) 1999 BF_{13}	24 January 1999	list
(66210) 1999 CR_{14}	15 February 1999	list
(66252) 1999 GM_{2}	6 April 1999	list
(66278) 1999 JC_{11}	9 May 1999	list
(66282) 1999 JA_{13}	9 May 1999	list
(66481) 1999 RZ_{34}	11 September 1999	list
(66482) 1999 RW_{37}	12 September 1999	list
(66485) 1999 RX_{41}	13 September 1999	list
(66487) 1999 RL_{42}	13 September 1999	list
(66489) 1999 RS_{44}	15 September 1999	list
(66659) 1999 TJ_{1}	1 October 1999	list
(66663) 1999 TV_{8}	6 October 1999	list^{[E]}
(66664) 1999 TB_{9}	7 October 1999	list^{[E]}
(66665) 1999 TC_{9}	7 October 1999	list^{[E]}
(66666) 1999 TL_{9}	7 October 1999	list^{[E]}
(66668) 1999 TN_{14}	11 October 1999	list^{[E]}
(66673) 1999 TC_{19}	15 October 1999	list
(66847) 1999 VT_{4}	5 November 1999	list

(66852) 1999 VH_{11}	9 November 1999	list
(66854) 1999 VL_{19}	10 November 1999	list
(66935) 1999 WZ_{1}	26 November 1999	list
(66937) 1999 WB_{6}	28 November 1999	list
(67418) 2000 QS_{68}	29 August 2000	list
(67513) 2000 RA_{60}	5 September 2000	list
(67714) 2000 UC_{2}	22 October 2000	list
(67885) 2000 WB_{51}	28 November 2000	list
(69933) 1998 UA_{7}	21 October 1998	list
(69960) 1998 VN_{31}	11 November 1998	list
(70003) 1998 XV_{12}	15 December 1998	list
(70018) 1998 YP_{9}	25 December 1998	list^{[E]}
(70022) 1999 AF_{7}	9 January 1999	list
(70047) 1999 FL_{10}	16 March 1999	list
(70125) 1999 NZ	7 July 1999	list
(70182) 1999 RS_{1}	5 September 1999	list
(70183) 1999 RA_{3}	6 September 1999	list
(70209) 1999 RL_{34}	10 September 1999	list
(70211) 1999 RZ_{37}	12 September 1999	list
(70212) 1999 RA_{38}	12 September 1999	list
(70217) 1999 RM_{42}	14 September 1999	list
(70219) 1999 RB_{44}	15 September 1999	list
(70412) 1999 SM_{4}	29 September 1999	list
(70427) 1999 TB_{1}	1 October 1999	list
(70428) 1999 TP_{1}	1 October 1999	list

(70429) 1999 TY_{1}	2 October 1999	list
(70437) 1999 TK_{6}	6 October 1999	list^{[E]}
(70438) 1999 TX_{6}	6 October 1999	list^{[E]}
(70439) 1999 TE_{7}	6 October 1999	list^{[E]}
(70442) 1999 TR_{9}	8 October 1999	list^{[E]}
(70447) 1999 TG_{14}	10 October 1999	list^{[E]}
(70676) 1999 UM	16 October 1999	list
(70677) 1999 UU	16 October 1999	list
(70729) 1999 VU_{4}	5 November 1999	list
(70738) 1999 VF_{11}	8 November 1999	list
(70742) 1999 VF_{19}	8 November 1999	list
(70743) 1999 VG_{19}	9 November 1999	list
(70941) 1999 WJ_{6}	28 November 1999	list
(71225) 1999 YU_{13}	31 December 1999	list
(71233) 2000 AC	1 January 2000	list
(71283) 2000 AB_{50}	4 January 2000	list
(71284) 2000 AE_{50}	5 January 2000	list
(71386) 2000 AE_{153}	6 January 2000	list
(71434) 2000 AJ_{205}	15 January 2000	list
(71460) 2000 BA_{3}	26 January 2000	list
(71523) 2000 CO_{76}	10 February 2000	list
(71546) 2000 DK_{2}	24 February 2000	list^{[E]}
(71813) 2000 UZ	21 October 2000	list
(72055) 2000 YF_{8}	22 December 2000	list
(72417) 2001 CF_{32}	11 February 2001	list

(72453) 2001 DO_{6}	16 February 2001	list
(74314) 1998 UT_{7}	23 October 1998	list
(74316) 1998 UW_{15}	24 October 1998	list
(74374) 1998 XN_{4}	9 December 1998	list
(74379) 1998 XU_{12}	15 December 1998	list
(74428) 1999 BX_{3}	20 January 1999	list
(74429) 1999 BU_{7}	21 January 1999	list
(74430) 1999 BN_{10}	24 January 1999	list
(74433) 1999 BC_{13}	24 January 1999	list
(74445) 1999 CP_{14}	15 February 1999	list
(74556) 1999 LG_{6}	11 June 1999	list
(74598) 1999 RU_{1}	5 September 1999	list
(74599) 1999 RF_{3}	6 September 1999	list
(74627) 1999 RP_{42}	14 September 1999	list
(74787) 1999 SH_{2}	22 September 1999	list
(74792) 1999 SS_{9}	29 September 1999	list
(74806) 1999 TT	1 October 1999	list
(74807) 1999 TV	1 October 1999	list
(74808) 1999 TW_{1}	1 October 1999	list
(74812) 1999 TN_{5}	1 October 1999	list^{[E]}
(74813) 1999 TB_{7}	6 October 1999	list^{[E]}
(74825) 1999 TE_{17}	15 October 1999	list
(75010) 1999 UP	16 October 1999	list
(75012) 1999 UO_{3}	17 October 1999	list
(75061) 1999 VK_{7}	7 November 1999	list

(75062) 1999 VZ_{7}	8 November 1999	list
(75066) 1999 VK_{11}	10 November 1999	list
(75074) 1999 VU_{21}	12 November 1999	list
(75075) 1999 VB_{22}	13 November 1999	list
(75224) 1999 WC_{3}	27 November 1999	list
(75232) 1999 WK_{6}	28 November 1999	list
(75233) 1999 WE_{7}	28 November 1999	list
(75234) 1999 WO_{7}	28 November 1999	list
(75235) 1999 WX_{7}	29 November 1999	list
(75245) 1999 WH_{18}	29 November 1999	list
(75268) 1999 XN_{15}	5 December 1999	list
(75269) 1999 XU_{15}	6 December 1999	list
(75568) 2000 AR_{1}	2 January 2000	list
(75629) 2000 AK_{50}	6 January 2000	list
(75784) 2000 AR_{205}	15 January 2000	list
(75785) 2000 AS_{205}	15 January 2000	list
(75806) 2000 AW_{237}	6 January 2000	list
(75812) 2000 BF	16 January 2000	list
(75886) 2000 CZ_{33}	4 February 2000	list
(75968) 2000 CF_{104}	10 February 2000	list
(75986) 2000 DO_{3}	28 February 2000	list^{[E]}
(76144) 2000 EK_{14}	5 March 2000	list
(77036) 2001 CV_{35}	14 February 2001	list
(77053) 2001 DR_{6}	16 February 2001	list
(79768) 1998 UO_{7}	22 October 1998	list

(79774) 1998 UL_{15}	22 October 1998	list
(79778) 1998 UC_{21}	29 October 1998	list
(79790) 1998 VF_{5}	11 November 1998	list
(79885) 1999 AE_{10}	14 January 1999	list
(79891) 1999 BS_{1}	17 January 1999	list
(79897) 1999 BY_{5}	21 January 1999	list
(79901) 1999 BK_{9}	22 January 1999	list
(79904) 1999 BO_{13}	25 January 1999	list
(80019) 1999 HL_{2}	23 April 1999	list^{[E]}
(80111) 1999 RK_{42}	13 September 1999	list
(80181) 1999 VD_{11}	7 November 1999	list
(80244) 1999 WY_{1}	25 November 1999	list
(80246) 1999 WW_{6}	28 November 1999	list
(80247) 1999 WD_{7}	28 November 1999	list
(80248) 1999 WL_{7}	28 November 1999	list
(80263) 1999 XQ_{15}	5 December 1999	list
(80264) 1999 XR_{15}	5 December 1999	list
(80444) 1999 YG_{9}	31 December 1999	list
(80446) 1999 YW_{13}	31 December 1999	list
(80498) 2000 AG_{50}	5 January 2000	list
(80633) 2000 AU_{205}	15 January 2000	list
(80654) 2000 BE_{2}	25 January 2000	list
(80682) 2000 BN_{30}	27 January 2000	list
(80696) 2000 CB_{1}	3 February 2000	list
(80697) 2000 CC_{1}	3 February 2000	list

(80699) 2000 CM_{1}	4 February 2000	list
(80738) 2000 CW_{33}	4 February 2000	list
(80739) 2000 CK_{34}	5 February 2000	list
(80779) 2000 CP_{76}	10 February 2000	list
(80823) 2000 DP	23 February 2000	list
(81206) 2000 FB_{11}	30 March 2000	list
(81550) 2000 HU_{23}	26 April 2000	list
(81931) 2000 OF_{7}	28 July 2000	list
(82019) 2000 SK_{23}	26 September 2000	list
(85768) 1998 TV_{29}	15 October 1998	list
(85775) 1998 UY_{20}	29 October 1998	list
(85820) 1998 XP_{9}	14 December 1998	list
(85843) 1998 YT_{9}	25 December 1998	list^{[E]}
(85865) 1999 BW_{8}	22 January 1999	list
(85866) 1999 BV_{9}	22 January 1999	list
(85867) 1999 BY_{9}	23 January 1999	list
(85868) 1999 BZ_{9}	23 January 1999	list
(85869) 1999 BK_{10}	23 January 1999	list
(85880) 1999 CL_{14}	15 February 1999	list
(86065) 1999 RO_{27}	7 September 1999	list
(86066) 1999 RR_{27}	8 September 1999	list
(86069) 1999 RO_{32}	9 September 1999	list
(86070) 1999 RZ_{43}	15 September 1999	list
(86201) 1999 TD_{1}	1 October 1999	list
(86202) 1999 TT_{1}	1 October 1999	list

(86206) 1999 TK_{9}	7 October 1999	list^{[E]}
(86207) 1999 TP_{15}	7 October 1999	list^{[E]}
(86278) 1999 UN	16 October 1999	list
(86297) 1999 VP_{21}	12 November 1999	list
(86325) 1999 WC_{6}	28 November 1999	list
(86327) 1999 WM_{13}	29 November 1999	list
(86421) 2000 BC_{3}	26 January 2000	list
(86425) 2000 BQ_{22}	26 January 2000	list
(86470) 2000 CV_{76}	10 February 2000	list
(86471) 2000 CX_{76}	10 February 2000	list
(86472) 2000 CZ_{76}	10 February 2000	list
(87703) 2000 SE_{23}	25 September 2000	list
(87704) 2000 SG_{23}	26 September 2000	list
(88244) 2001 CG_{38}	15 February 2001	list
(91206) 1998 WY_{7}	24 November 1998	list
(91219) 1999 AN_{7}	11 January 1999	list
(91227) 1999 BG_{9}	22 January 1999	list
(91228) 1999 BG_{13}	24 January 1999	list
(91229) 1999 BN_{15}	26 January 1999	list
(91236) 1999 CP_{4}	6 February 1999	list
(91274) 1999 DM_{3}	18 February 1999	list^{[E]}
(91312) 1999 GE_{7}	13 April 1999	list^{[E]}
(91451) 1999 RG_{38}	13 September 1999	list
(91589) 1999 TF_{1}	1 October 1999	list
(91593) 1999 TF_{7}	6 October 1999	list^{[E]}

(91594) 1999 TN_{8}	6 October 1999	list^{[E]}
(91601) 1999 TA_{17}	10 October 1999	list
(91603) 1999 TA_{19}	15 October 1999	list
(91843) 1999 UF_{1}	16 October 1999	list
(91905) 1999 VB_{20}	10 November 1999	list
(92060) 1999 WY_{6}	28 November 1999	list
(92071) 1999 WJ_{18}	29 November 1999	list
(92285) 2000 EW	3 March 2000	list
(92623) 2000 QB_{8}	25 August 2000	list^{[E]}
(92770) 2000 QO_{129}	30 August 2000	list
(92972) 2000 RZ_{59}	5 September 2000	list
(93067) 2000 SB_{23}	25 September 2000	list
(93525) 2000 UX	21 October 2000	list
(93526) 2000 UY	21 October 2000	list
(96572) 1998 UN_{16}	23 October 1998	list
(96614) 1999 CL_{16}	6 February 1999	list
(96622) 1999 DY	18 February 1999	list
(96635) 1999 GR_{4}	10 April 1999	list
(96860) 1999 SG_{2}	22 September 1999	list
(97061) 1999 VE_{5}	5 November 1999	list
(97067) 1999 VL_{21}	12 November 1999	list
(97068) 1999 VT_{21}	12 November 1999	list
(97183) 1999 WR_{1}	25 November 1999	list
(97279) 1999 XT_{144}	6 December 1999	list
(97341) 2000 AU_{1}	2 January 2000	list

(97488) 2000 CG_{76}	5 February 2000	list
(97489) 2000 CQ_{76}	10 February 2000	list
(97519) 2000 DM_{16}	29 February 2000	list
(97852) 2000 QH_{6}	24 August 2000	list^{[E]}
(97853) 2000 QM_{8}	25 August 2000	list^{[E]}
(97953) 2000 QR_{129}	30 August 2000	list
(98034) 2000 RQ_{12}	2 September 2000	list
(98120) 2000 SK_{5}	22 September 2000	list^{[E]}
(98126) 2000 SH_{23}	26 September 2000	list
(98393) 2000 UG_{2}	23 October 2000	list
(98394) 2000 UH_{2}	23 October 2000	list
(101550) 1999 AE	5 January 1999	list
(101557) 1999 AW_{6}	9 January 1999	list
(101566) 1999 AO_{21}	14 January 1999	list
(101573) 1999 BQ	16 January 1999	list
(101580) 1999 BZ_{5}	21 January 1999	list
(101581) 1999 BY_{7}	21 January 1999	list
(101582) 1999 BZ_{8}	22 January 1999	list
(101583) 1999 BF_{10}	23 January 1999	list
(101589) 1999 BP_{14}	16 January 1999	list
(101594) 1999 BE_{26}	26 January 1999	list
(101620) 1999 CN_{14}	15 February 1999	list
(101622) 1999 CP_{16}	15 February 1999	list
(101775) 1999 GT	5 April 1999	list
(101870) 1999 NV	7 July 1999	list

(101906) 1999 RX_{1}	6 September 1999	list
(101907) 1999 RC_{3}	6 September 1999	list
(101951) 1999 RK_{31}	9 September 1999	list
(101953) 1999 RM_{32}	9 September 1999	list
(101956) 1999 RS_{36}	11 September 1999	list
(101957) 1999 RT_{36}	12 September 1999	list
(101959) 1999 RH_{38}	13 September 1999	list
(101964) 1999 RU_{41}	13 September 1999	list
(101965) 1999 RY_{41}	13 September 1999	list
(102191) 1999 SH_{4}	29 September 1999	list
(102212) 1999 TA_{1}	1 October 1999	list
(102213) 1999 TL_{1}	1 October 1999	list
(102214) 1999 TO_{1}	1 October 1999	list
(102220) 1999 TJ_{8}	6 October 1999	list^{[E]}
(102221) 1999 TT_{9}	7 October 1999	list^{[E]}
(102523) 1999 UG	16 October 1999	list
(102524) 1999 UK	16 October 1999	list
(102525) 1999 UV	16 October 1999	list
(102526) 1999 UG_{1}	16 October 1999	list
(102527) 1999 UH_{2}	17 October 1999	list
(102529) 1999 UD_{4}	27 October 1999	list
(102599) 1999 VX_{4}	5 November 1999	list
(102600) 1999 VC_{5}	5 November 1999	list
(102601) 1999 VD_{5}	5 November 1999	list
(102602) 1999 VG_{5}	7 November 1999	list

(102605) 1999 VH_{9}	8 November 1999	list
(102607) 1999 VJ_{11}	10 November 1999	list
(102611) 1999 VK_{19}	10 November 1999	list
(102612) 1999 VY_{19}	9 November 1999	list
(102614) 1999 VG_{21}	12 November 1999	list
(102615) 1999 VJ_{21}	12 November 1999	list
(102616) 1999 VC_{22}	13 November 1999	list
(102861) 1999 WZ_{2}	27 November 1999	list
(102862) 1999 WB_{3}	27 November 1999	list
(102868) 1999 WO_{6}	28 November 1999	list
(102903) 1999 XK_{15}	5 December 1999	list
(103226) 1999 YH_{9}	31 December 1999	list
(103228) 1999 YT_{13}	31 December 1999	list
(103247) 2000 AS_{4}	3 January 2000	list
(103302) 2000 AF_{50}	5 January 2000	list
(103303) 2000 AM_{50}	6 January 2000	list
(103509) 2000 BG_{2}	26 January 2000	list
(103511) 2000 BW_{2}	25 January 2000	list
(103512) 2000 BZ_{2}	26 January 2000	list
(103545) 2000 BP_{22}	25 January 2000	list
(103558) 2000 BE_{29}	25 January 2000	list
(103577) 2000 CL_{1}	4 February 2000	list
(103640) 2000 CQ_{33}	4 February 2000	list
(103641) 2000 CV_{33}	4 February 2000	list
(103642) 2000 CG_{34}	5 February 2000	list

(103653) 2000 CR_{39}	5 February 2000	list
(103692) 2000 CJ_{72}	3 February 2000	list
(103698) 2000 CH_{77}	10 February 2000	list
(103768) 2000 DO	23 February 2000	list
(105554) 2000 RJ_{53}	5 September 2000	list
(105555) 2000 RK_{53}	5 September 2000	list
(105579) 2000 RE_{77}	8 September 2000	list
(105648) 2000 SA_{23}	25 September 2000	list
(105673) 2000 SL_{42}	26 September 2000	list
(106830) 2000 YC_{4}	19 December 2000	list
(106835) 2000 YE_{8}	22 December 2000	list
(106838) 2000 YT_{9}	23 December 2000	list
(107291) 2001 CF	1 February 2001	list
(107407) 2001 DS_{6}	17 February 2001	list
(118304) 1998 UQ_{20}	28 October 1998	list
(118321) 1998 XS_{12}	15 December 1998	list
(118416) 1999 TD_{9}	7 October 1999	list^{[E]}
(118457) 1999 WP_{6}	28 November 1999	list
(118493) 2000 DH_{3}	27 February 2000	list^{[E]}
(118521) 2000 EO_{14}	5 March 2000	list
(118735) 2000 QM_{129}	30 August 2000	list
(121013) 1999 AG_{21}	13 January 1999	list
(121020) 1999 BV_{8}	22 January 1999	list
(121021) 1999 BB_{13}	24 January 1999	list
(121104) 1999 GQ	5 April 1999	list

(121321) 1999 SH	16 September 1999	list
(121341) 1999 TB_{19}	15 October 1999	list
(121644) 1999 WN_{6}	28 November 1999	list
(121645) 1999 WQ_{7}	28 November 1999	list
(121864) 2000 CK_{76}	9 February 2000	list
(122307) 2000 QE_{8}	25 August 2000	list^{[E]}
(122308) 2000 QJ_{8}	25 August 2000	list^{[E]}
(122558) 2000 RA	1 September 2000	list
(122631) 2000 RV_{78}	10 September 2000	list
(122691) 2000 SP_{11}	24 September 2000	list
(123385) 2000 WO_{62}	28 November 2000	list
(129738) 1999 BT	16 January 1999	list
(129761) 1999 GL_{6}	14 April 1999	list
(129886) 1999 TA_{9}	7 October 1999	list^{[E]}
(129995) 1999 VA_{20}	10 November 1999	list
(130079) 1999 WW_{2}	26 November 1999	list
(130080) 1999 WQ_{6}	28 November 1999	list
(130082) 1999 WP_{13}	29 November 1999	list
(130207) 2000 AV_{205}	15 January 2000	list
(130222) 2000 BM	24 January 2000	list
(130244) 2000 CD_{76}	4 February 2000	list
(130585) 2000 RU_{77}	9 September 2000	list
(130808) 2000 UU	21 October 2000	list
(130818) 2000 UM_{13}	23 October 2000	list
(130857) 2000 UV_{77}	23 October 2000	list

(134467) 1998 UM_{7}	22 October 1998	list
(134497) 1999 BQ_{1}	16 January 1999	list
(134498) 1999 BZ_{7}	21 January 1999	list
(134499) 1999 BE_{9}	22 January 1999	list
(134578) 1999 TN_{7}	7 October 1999	list^{[E]}
(134644) 1999 VV_{4}	5 November 1999	list
(134645) 1999 VZ_{4}	5 November 1999	list
(134646) 1999 VN_{7}	7 November 1999	list
(134647) 1999 VM_{9}	8 November 1999	list
(134675) 1999 WR_{6}	28 November 1999	list
(137067) 1998 WQ_{9}	28 November 1998	list
(137107) 1999 AT_{6}	9 January 1999	list
(137122) 1999 BX_{12}	24 January 1999	list
(137309) 1999 TM_{5}	1 October 1999	list^{[E]}
(137310) 1999 TF_{9}	7 October 1999	list^{[E]}
(137502) 1999 VP_{19}	10 November 1999	list
(137503) 1999 VZ_{19}	10 November 1999	list
(137504) 1999 VO_{21}	12 November 1999	list
(137505) 1999 VZ_{21}	12 November 1999	list
(137506) 1999 VA_{22}	12 November 1999	list
(137631) 1999 WU_{1}	25 November 1999	list
(137901) 2000 AD_{204}	12 January 2000	list
(137926) 2000 BS_{22}	27 January 2000	list
(137947) 2000 CD_{1}	4 February 2000	list
(137970) 2000 CR_{33}	4 February 2000	list

(137971) 2000 CQ_{39}	5 February 2000	list
(145843) 1999 AD_{10}	13 January 1999	list
(146009) 2000 CR_{76}	10 February 2000	list
(146043) 2000 ET_{7}	2 March 2000	list
(148063) 1998 UA_{20}	28 October 1998	list
(148082) 1999 BH_{15}	26 January 1999	list
(148333) 2000 QA_{149}	30 August 2000	list
(150338) 1999 XL_{15}	5 December 1999	list
(150372) 2000 CF_{76}	5 February 2000	list
(150396) 2000 EP_{14}	5 March 2000	list
(150402) 2000 EM_{75}	10 March 2000	list
(152786) 1999 TS	1 October 1999	list
(157882) 1999 RV_{1}	5 September 1999	list
(157883) 1999 RF_{38}	13 September 1999	list
(157950) 2000 CN_{40}	3 February 2000	list
(162155) 1999 BV_{7}	21 January 1999	list
(162167) 1999 GH_{6}	13 April 1999	list
(162194) 1999 RP_{35}	11 September 1999	list
(162270) 1999 VU_{7}	7 November 1999	list
(162271) 1999 VC_{8}	8 November 1999	list
(162272) 1999 VQ_{9}	9 November 1999	list
(162274) 1999 VO_{19}	10 November 1999	list
(162275) 1999 VM_{21}	12 November 1999	list
(162310) 1999 WN_{13}	29 November 1999	list
(162493) 2000 QY_{7}	25 August 2000	list^{[E]}

(162494) 2000 QA_{8}	25 August 2000	list^{[E]}
(162499) 2000 QZ_{33}	26 August 2000	list^{[E]}
(162828) 2001 CG	1 February 2001	list
(164904) 1999 WP_{2}	26 November 1999	list
(164912) 1999 XP_{15}	5 December 1999	list
(168443) 1998 XL_{9}	12 December 1998	list
(168503) 1999 TL_{8}	6 October 1999	list^{[E]}
(168532) 1999 VV_{21}	12 November 1999	list
(168552) 1999 WV_{7}	29 November 1999	list
(171574) 1999 VS_{4}	5 November 1999	list
(171578) 1999 VW_{21}	12 November 1999	list
(171590) 1999 WH_{7}	28 November 1999	list
(173216) 1998 TY_{5}	15 October 1998	list
(173235) 1999 BE_{15}	24 January 1999	list
(173451) 2000 QN_{8}	25 August 2000	list^{[E]}
(178545) 1999 VN_{19}	10 November 1999	list
(178571) 1999 WD_{6}	28 November 1999	list
(181885) 1999 RK_{32}	9 September 1999	list
(181906) 1999 SC_{4}	29 September 1999	list
(185756) 1999 TM_{9}	7 October 1999	list^{[E]}
(187793) 1999 BL_{10}	23 January 1999	list
(187828) 1999 VX_{21}	12 November 1999	list
(189020) 1998 YU_{3}	17 December 1998	list
(190461) 2000 CP_{39}	3 February 2000	list
(192684) 1999 TW_{6}	6 October 1999	list^{[E]}

(192803) 1999 VF_{21}	10 November 1999	list
(192926) 2000 AN_{5}	4 January 2000	list
(193197) 2000 QQ_{129}	30 August 2000	list
(193450) 2000 WQ_{151}	29 November 2000	list
(200162) 1999 BZ_{12}	24 January 1999	list
(200286) 2000 AY_{49}	2 January 2000	list
(200294) 2000 AT_{205}	15 January 2000	list
(200303) 2000 CQ_{97}	9 February 2000	list
(200530) 2001 DR_{7}	18 February 2001	list
(205116) 1999 VF_{20}	12 November 1999	list
(205145) 1999 XK_{36}	6 December 1999	list
(205174) 2000 BO	16 January 2000	list
(208067) 1999 VH_{19}	9 November 1999	list
(208102) 2000 BX_{2}	26 January 2000	list
(210576) 1999 VW_{7}	7 November 1999	list
(210737) 2000 UC_{1}	21 October 2000	list
(216931) 1998 UM_{16}	23 October 1998	list
(217698) 1999 TG_{9}	7 October 1999	list^{[E]}
(222177) 2000 BL_{29}	27 January 2000	list
(225442) 2000 DF_{16}	28 February 2000	list
(228287) 2000 BE_{3}	26 January 2000	list
(231801) 2000 EB_{20}	6 March 2000	list
(237415) 1998 UR_{7}	22 October 1998	list
(239880) 2000 QM_{35}	28 August 2000	list
(246957) 1999 SA_{4}	29 September 1999	list

(246997) 1999 VG_{9}	8 November 1999	list
(247034) 2000 CH_{76}	9 February 2000	list
(251796) 1999 TO_{9}	8 October 1999	list^{[E]}
(251980) 2000 BE	16 January 2000	list
(257750) 2000 BN	24 January 2000	list
(257765) 2000 CX_{33}	4 February 2000	list
(269745) 1998 WU_{8}	27 November 1998	list
(275566) 1999 TL_{7}	7 October 1999	list^{[E]}
(275589) 1999 VE_{20}	10 November 1999	list
(275669) 2000 QO_{68}	25 August 2000	list
(279766) 1999 RE_{3}	6 September 1999	list
(285299) 1998 TJ_{16}	14 October 1998	list
(306453) 1999 BE_{8}	22 January 1999	list
(306518) 1999 WF_{7}	28 November 1999	list
(306546) 2000 AM_{5}	4 January 2000	list
(313008) 1999 VD_{19}	8 November 1999	list
(347503) 1998 XT_{16}	15 December 1998	list
(399337) 2000 CN_{39}	4 February 2000	list
(415761) 2000 SF_{23}	25 September 2000	list
(508818) 2001 DC_{1}	16 February 2001	list
Co-discovery made with:^{A} P. Radovan^{B} D. Matković^{C} V. Brcic^{D} M. Dusić^{E} M. Jurić
