= Blaca hermitage =

Coordinates: 43°17′35″N 16°31′46″E

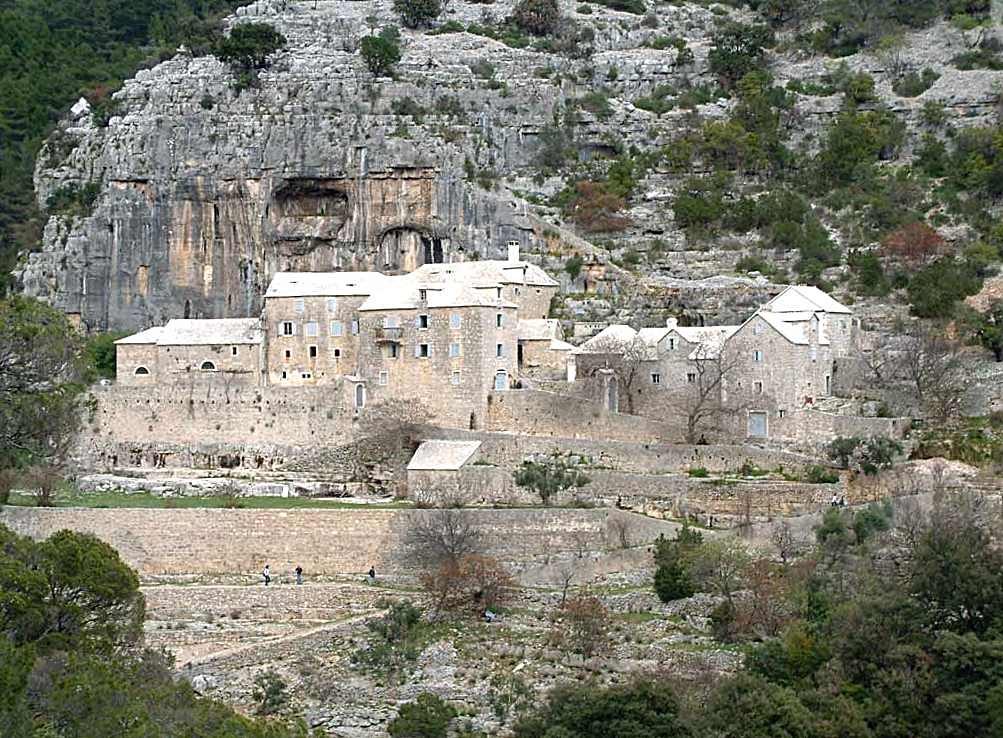
Pustinja Blaca Monastery

The Blaca Hermitage (Croatian: Pustinja Blaca) is located on the southern side of Brač island, in the Split-Dalmatia County of Croatia.

== Site Description ==
The hermitage was originally established in 1551 by two Glagolitic monks, and continued by successive generations of monks until 1963 with the death of Father Niko Miličević.

== World Heritage Status ==
This site was added to the UNESCO World Heritage Tentative List on January 29, 2007, in the Cultural category.

== Gallery ==
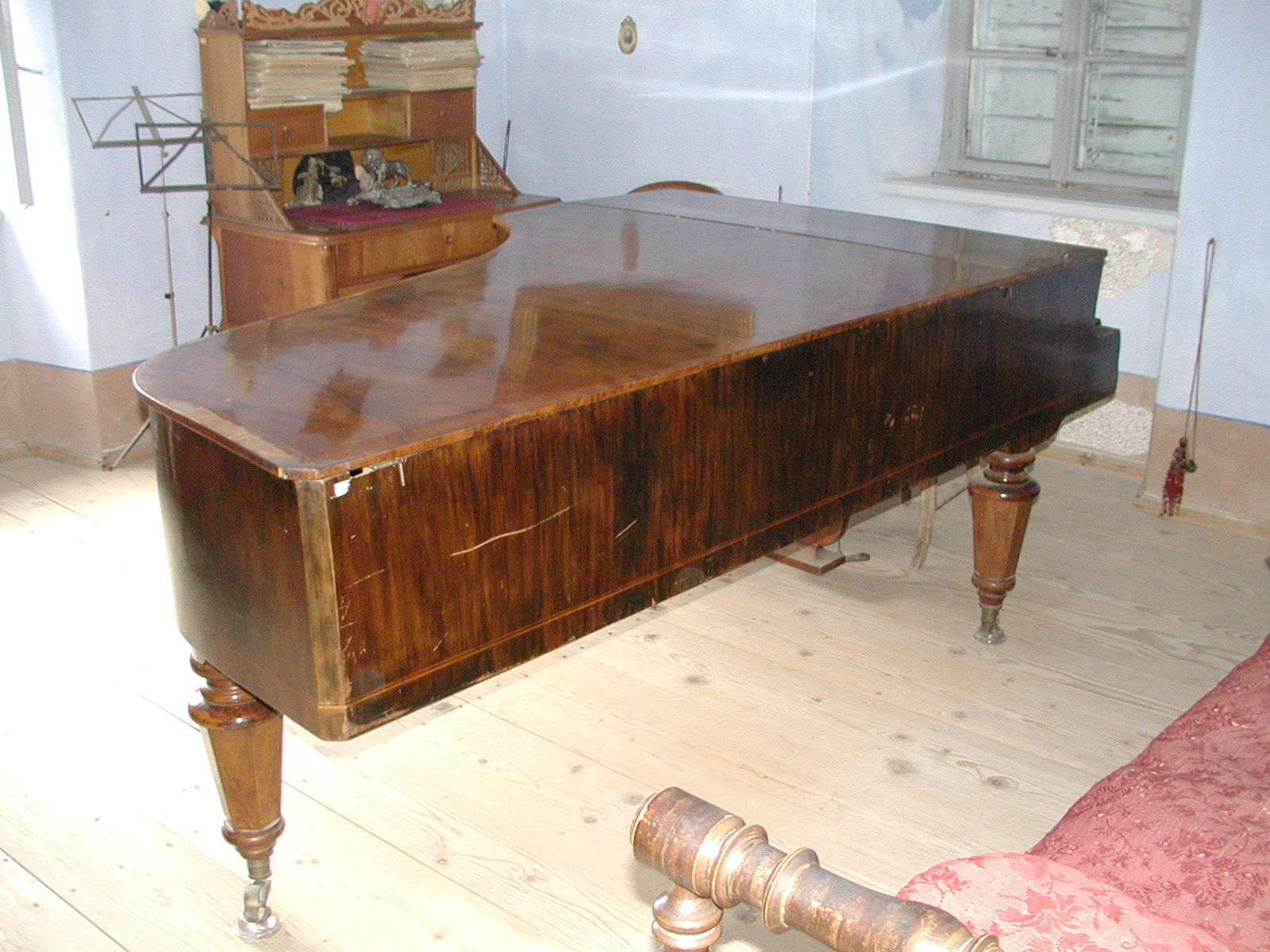
Monastery piano

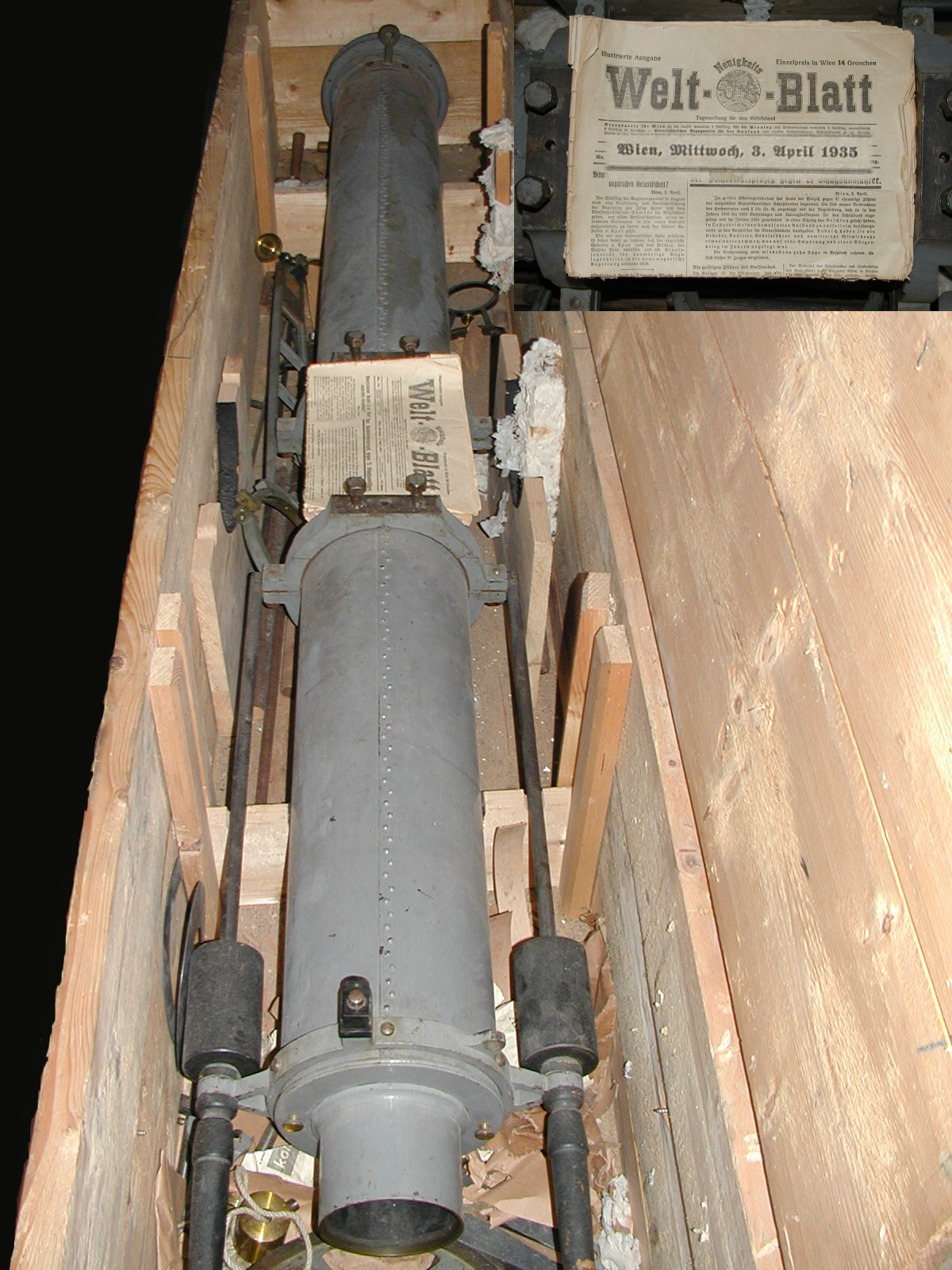
Monastery telescope

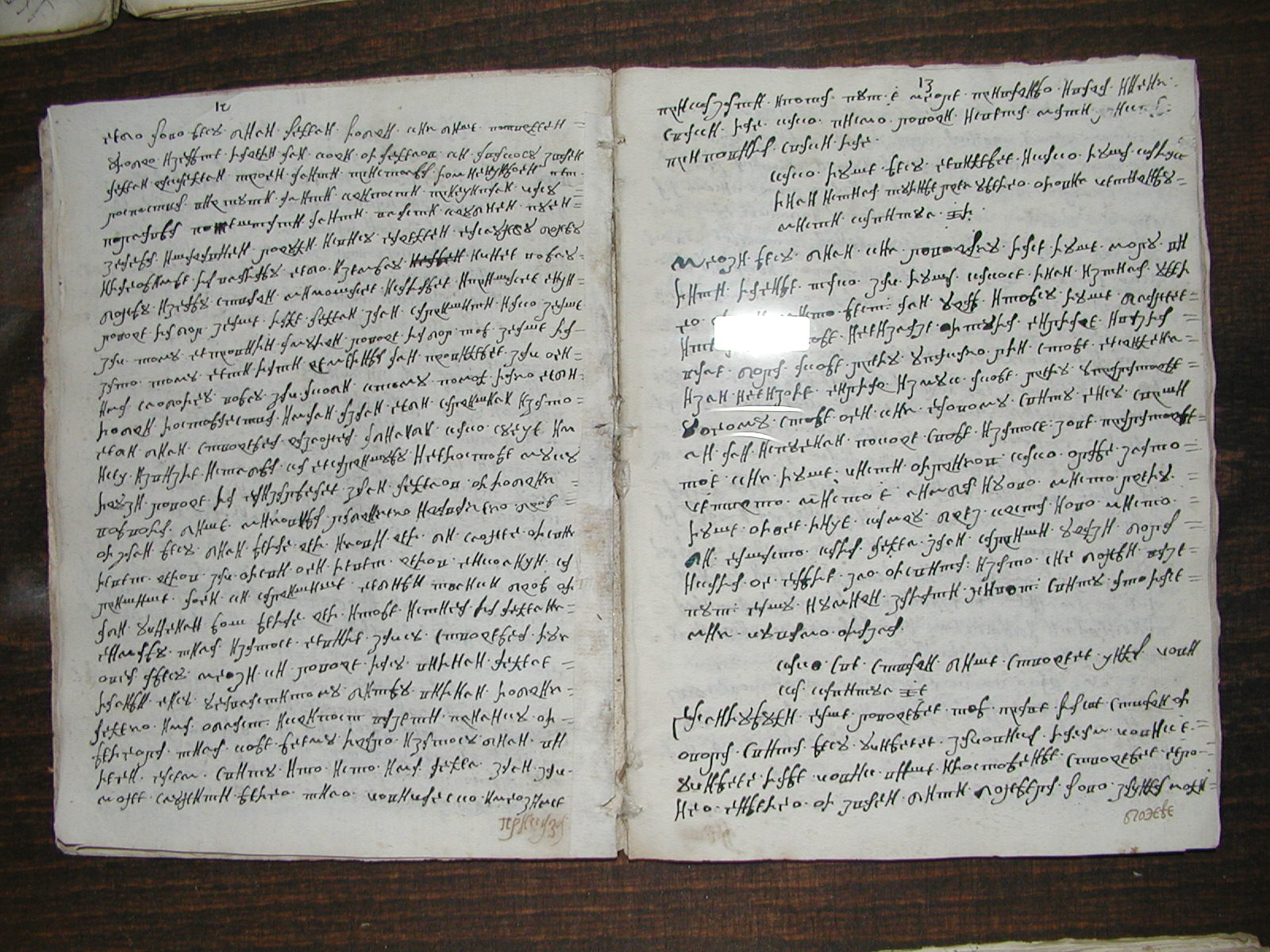
Old manuscript

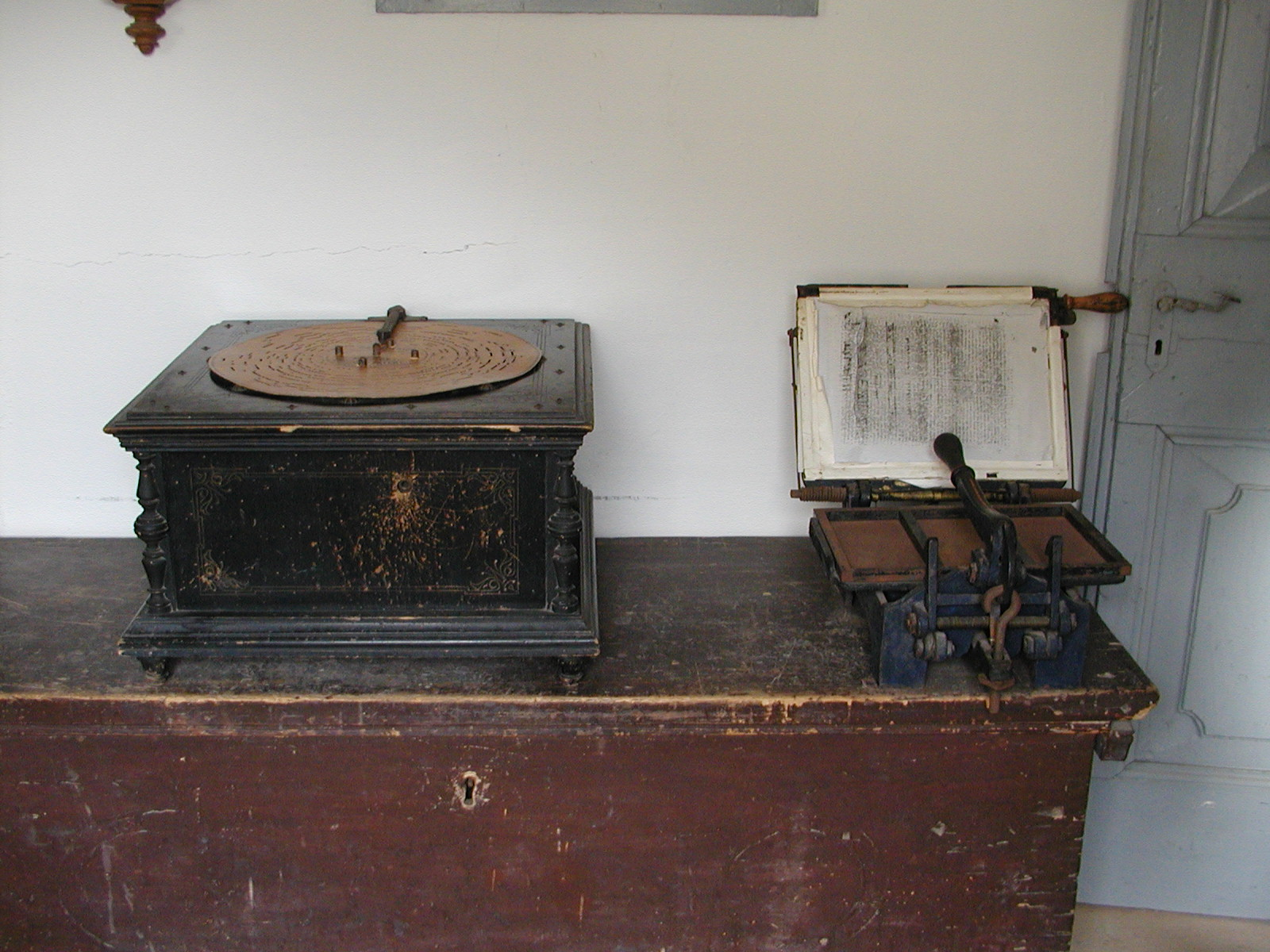
Gramophone and printer

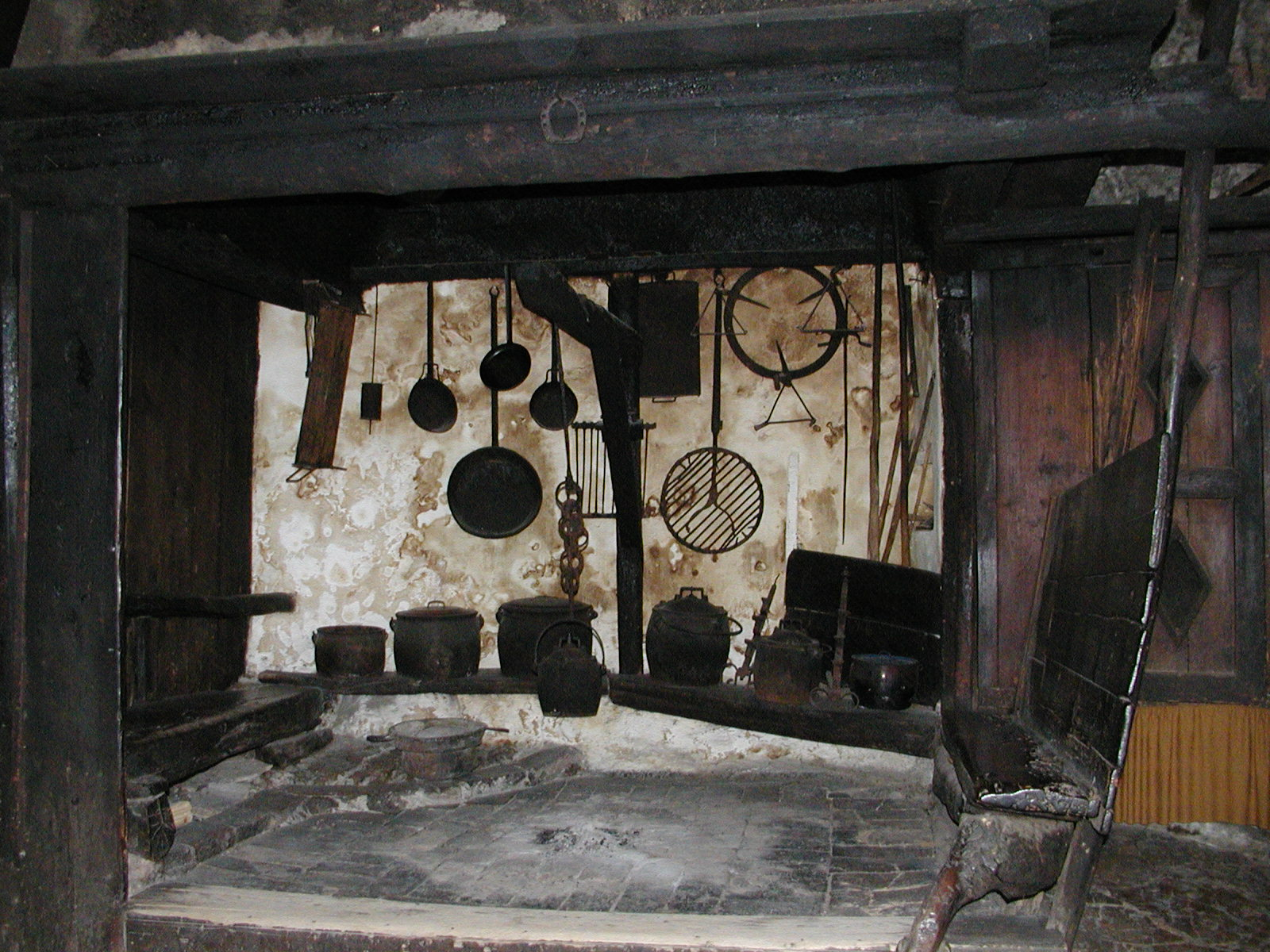
Old monastery kitchen

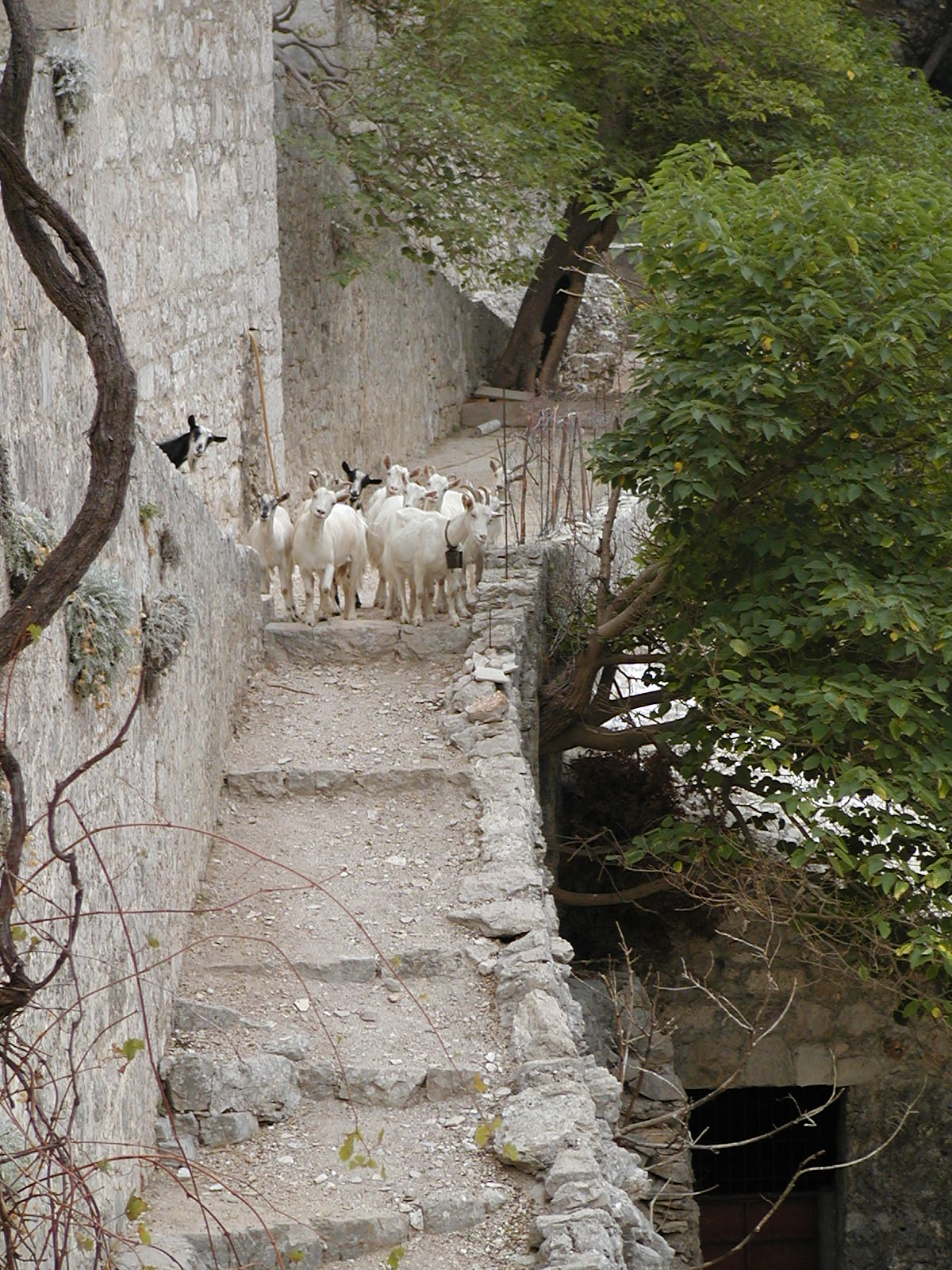
Monastery goat-breeding

== See also ==
- Tentative list of World Heritage Sites in Croatia
