= Višnjan Observatory =

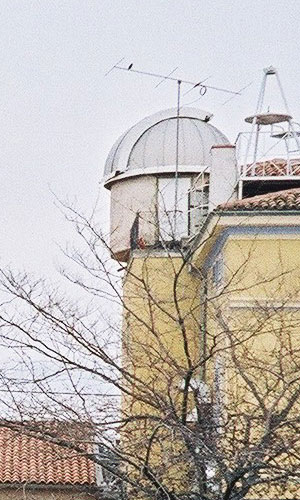
- Named after: Višnjan
- Observatory code: 120
- Location: Višnjan, Istria County, Adriatic Croatia, Croatia
- Coordinates: 45°16′39″N 13°43′34″E
- Website: www.astro.hr
- Related media on Commons

Višnjan Observatory (Croatian: Zvjezdarnica Višnjan; obs. code: 120) is an astronomical observatory located near the village of Višnjan in Croatia. It is headed by Korado Korlević, a prolific astronomer and discoverer of minor planets. In 2009, the Višnjan observatory moved to Tičan (at 45°17′27″N 13°44′57″E) and received the obs. code L01 on 5 October 2017 (M.P.C. 105,577).

== Description ==
Minor planets discovered: 108
see § List of discovered minor planets

Višnjan Observatory was founded in 1992, as a public observatory. It worked in the field of astrometry and search of a new asteroids. Increasing light pollution made the observations in Višnjan difficult, and they stopped in 2001. In 2009, a new building of the observatory was opened near the village of Tičan, approximately 2.5 kilometers away.

According to the statistic on observatory's website (Višnjan and Tičan) as of 2016, a total of 1420 asteroids and 2 comets have been discovered at the observatory, which uses 11 telescopes and has a staff of 78 members and volunteers.

The Minor Planet Center (MPC) directly credits the Višnjan Observatory with the discovery of 108 minor planets (see list below), while 1294 discoveries are credited to Korado Korlević. (The observatory's statistic may also include unnumbered minor planets for which the MPC does not assign a discoverer.)

The observatory is home of several summer programs for youth in astronomy, archeology, marine biology and other disciplines: Youth Science Camp, Summer School of Science and Višnjan School of Astronomy.

Željko Anderić, Korado Korlević, Damir Matković, Petar Radovan, and Vanja Brčić contributed to the revival of the observatory in Višnjan after the crisis following the breakup of Yugoslavia. Brčić is an IT specialist who runs a computer company and is involved in robotics. The Minor Planet Center credits him with the discovery of two asteroids in 1995, both discovered in collaboration with Korlević. He discovered 11604 Novigrad on October 21, 1995.

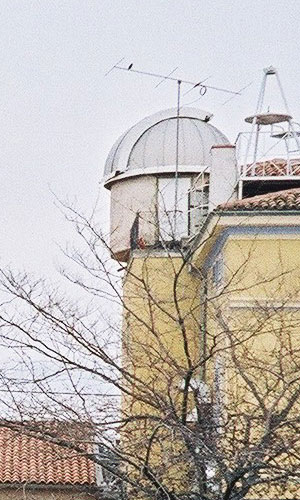
Višnjan Observatory

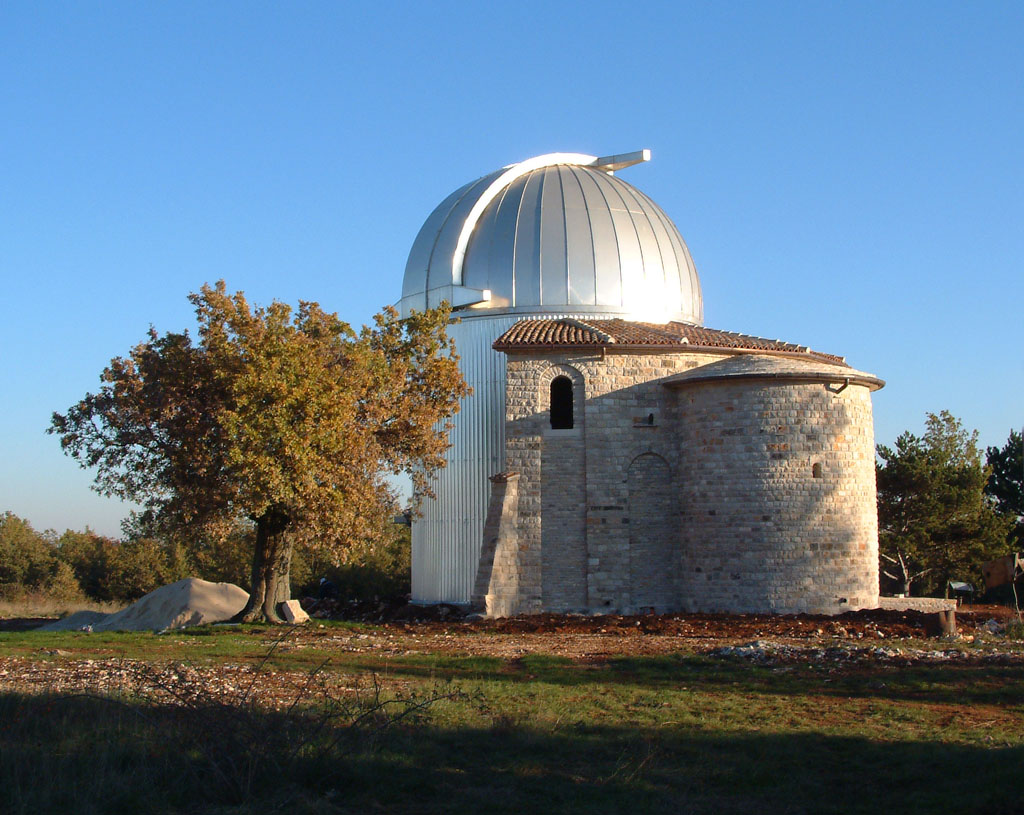
New observing site (Tičan Observatory)

== List of discovered minor planets ==
9429 Poreč	14 March 1996	list
12123 Pazin	18 July 1999	list
12541 Makarska	15 August 1998	list
12581 Rovinj	8 September 1999	list
(12582) 1999 RY_{34}	11 September 1999	list
(12605) 1999 SK	17 September 1999	list
(12925) 1999 SN_{4}	29 September 1999	list
(13287) 1998 QW_{53}	29 August 1998	list
(13711) 1998 QB_{26}	25 August 1998	list
(13712) 1998 QL_{30}	23 August 1998	list
(13713) 1998 QN_{30}	23 August 1998	list
(13725) 1998 QY_{55}	29 August 1998	list
(13749) 1998 SG_{49}	24 September 1998	list
(14112) 1998 QZ_{25}	25 August 1998	list
(14123) 1998 QA_{56}	29 August 1998	list
(14144) 1998 SQ_{22}	23 September 1998	list
(14507) 1996 CQ_{1}	14 February 1996	list
(14591) 1998 SZ_{21}	23 September 1998	list
(15866) 1996 KG	16 May 1996	list
(15888) 1997 EE_{29}	13 March 1997	list
(15978) 1998 QL_{1}	17 August 1998	list
(16737) 1996 KN_{1}	24 May 1996	list
(17834) 1998 HL_{43}	25 April 1998	list
(17872) 1998 SP_{22}	23 September 1998	list
(18694) 1998 HQ_{24}	23 April 1998	list

(18738) 1998 SN_{22}	23 September 1998	list
(19717) 1999 UZ_{40}	16 October 1999	list
(20402) 1998 OH_{6}	31 July 1998	list
(21538) 1998 QN_{1}	17 August 1998	list
(22610) 1998 JK_{4}	6 May 1998	list
(22667) 1998 QA_{26}	25 August 1998	list
(22668) 1998 QF_{26}	26 August 1998	list
(22698) 1998 RA_{5}	10 September 1998	list
(22716) 1998 SV_{9}	16 September 1998	list
(22720) 1998 SF_{49}	24 September 1998	list
(23848) 1998 RJ_{1}	10 September 1998	list
(23883) 1998 SL_{12}	21 September 1998	list
(23891) 1998 SC_{49}	23 September 1998	list
(25012) 1998 QC	17 August 1998	list
(25031) 1998 QM_{30}	23 August 1998	list
(25135) 1998 SX_{21}	23 September 1998	list
(25136) 1998 SE_{22}	23 September 1998	list
(26253) 1998 QB_{56}	29 August 1998	list
(27053) 1998 SU_{21}	17 September 1998	list
(28071) 1998 QC_{26}	25 August 1998	list
(29359) 1996 BK	16 January 1996	list
(29372) 1996 GA	5 April 1996	list
(29723) 1999 AD_{24}	14 January 1999	list
(31041) 1996 KD	16 May 1996	list
(33331) 1998 SY_{21}	23 September 1998	list

(35256) 1996 DT_{1}	23 February 1996	list
(35669) 1998 SO_{12}	22 September 1998	list
(40095) 1998 OV_{4}	29 July 1998	list
(40103) 1998 QX_{3}	17 August 1998	list
(40200) 1998 SW_{9}	18 September 1998	list
(40462) 1999 RC_{44}	15 September 1999	list
(42546) 1996 GF_{1}	15 April 1996	list
(42660) 1998 FR_{126}	29 March 1998	list
(42661) 1998 FT_{126}	29 March 1998	list
(42707) 1998 QM_{2}	17 August 1998	list
(42711) 1998 QY_{25}	25 August 1998	list
(44108) 1998 HT_{4}	20 April 1998	list
(44218) 1998 QO_{1}	17 August 1998	list
(44266) 1998 QV_{55}	26 August 1998	list
(44267) 1998 QZ_{55}	29 August 1998	list
(44364) 1998 SA_{22}	23 September 1998	list
(44365) 1998 SO_{22}	23 September 1998	list
(44390) 1998 ST_{63}	29 September 1998	list
(46832) 1998 QQ_{1}	17 August 1998	list
(46880) 1998 RC_{5}	15 September 1998	list
(48861) 1998 HR_{24}	24 April 1998	list
(48864) 1998 HK_{43}	25 April 1998	list
(48932) 1998 QB	17 August 1998	list
(48935) 1998 QK_{1}	17 August 1998	list
(48958) 1998 QD_{26}	25 August 1998	list

(49116) 1998 SX_{9}	18 September 1998	list
(49120) 1998 SJ_{12}	17 September 1998	list
(49125) 1998 SB_{22}	23 September 1998	list
(49126) 1998 SF_{22}	23 September 1998	list
(49127) 1998 ST_{22}	24 September 1998	list
(49134) 1998 SF_{27}	18 September 1998	list
(49148) 1998 SB_{49}	23 September 1998	list
(49149) 1998 SD_{49}	24 September 1998	list
(52507) 1996 GC_{1}	12 April 1996	list
(52865) 1998 SH_{22}	23 September 1998	list
(55946) 1998 HP_{24}	22 April 1998	list
(58994) 1998 SY_{9}	18 September 1998	list
(59473) 1999 HT_{1}	19 April 1999	list
(66062) 1998 RG_{1}	10 September 1998	list
(66101) 1998 SK_{22}	23 September 1998	list
(66102) 1998 SR_{22}	23 September 1998	list
(69843) 1998 SL_{22}	23 September 1998	list
(74083) 1998 OF_{6}	30 July 1998	list
(74100) 1998 QE_{26}	25 August 1998	list
(74352) 1998 VA_{55}	11 November 1998	list
(74425) 1999 BP	16 January 1999	list
(79529) 1998 QP_{1}	17 August 1998	list
(79591) 1998 RO_{20}	15 September 1998	list
(79653) 1998 SW_{21}	22 September 1998	list
(79654) 1998 SS_{22}	23 September 1998	list

(96519) 1998 RB_{5}	10 September 1998	list
(100950) 1998 PA	1 August 1998	list
(101056) 1998 RF_{1}	10 September 1998	list
(120809) 1998 HU_{7}	21 April 1998	list
(136931) 1998 OE_{6}	30 July 1998	list
(175769) 1998 VF_{55}	15 November 1998	list
(181823) 1998 SK_{12}	21 September 1998	list
(192525) 1998 SM_{12}	21 September 1998	list

== See also ==
- List of asteroid-discovering observatories
- List of astronomical observatories
- List of minor planet discoverers § Discovering dedicated institutions
- List of observatory codes
