= List of minor planets: 67001–68000 =

The following is a partial list of minor planets, running from minor-planet number 67001 through 68000, inclusive. The primary data for this and other partial lists is based on JPL's "Small-Body Orbital Elements" and data available from the Minor Planet Center. Critical list information is also provided by the MPC, unless otherwise specified from Lowell Observatory. A detailed description of the table's columns and additional sources are given on the main page including a complete list of every page in this series, and a statistical break-up on the dynamical classification of minor planets.

Also see the summary list of all named bodies in numerical and alphabetical order, and the corresponding naming citations for the number range of this particular list. New namings may only be added to this list after official publication, as the preannouncement of names is condemned by the Working Group for Small Bodies Nomenclature of the International Astronomical Union.

| Near-Earth obj. | MBA (inner) | MBA (outer) | Centaur |
| Mars-crosser | MBA (middle) | Jupiter trojan | Trans-Neptunian obj. |
| Unclassified |

== 67001–67100 ==
| Designation | | | Discovery | | | Properties | | Ref |
| Permanent | Provisional | Named after | Date | Site | Discoverer(s) | Category | Diam. | Ref |
|---|---|---|---|---|---|---|---|---|
| 67001 | 1999 XN_{117} | — | December 5, 1999 | Catalina | CSS | PAD | 4.9 km | MPC · JPL |
| 67002 | 1999 XJ_{118} | — | December 5, 1999 | Catalina | CSS | · | 7.1 km | MPC · JPL |
| 67003 | 1999 XU_{118} | — | December 5, 1999 | Catalina | CSS | GEF | 5.4 km | MPC · JPL |
| 67004 | 1999 XU_{119} | — | December 5, 1999 | Catalina | CSS | · | 4.7 km | MPC · JPL |
| 67005 | 1999 XZ_{120} | — | December 5, 1999 | Catalina | CSS | · | 4.9 km | MPC · JPL |
| 67006 | 1999 XD_{121} | — | December 5, 1999 | Catalina | CSS | · | 3.4 km | MPC · JPL |
| 67007 | 1999 XM_{121} | — | December 5, 1999 | Catalina | CSS | · | 4.0 km | MPC · JPL |
| 67008 | 1999 XD_{122} | — | December 7, 1999 | Catalina | CSS | · | 4.6 km | MPC · JPL |
| 67009 | 1999 XS_{122} | — | December 7, 1999 | Catalina | CSS | · | 4.0 km | MPC · JPL |
| 67010 | 1999 XD_{123} | — | December 7, 1999 | Catalina | CSS | · | 4.1 km | MPC · JPL |
| 67011 | 1999 XR_{123} | — | December 7, 1999 | Catalina | CSS | · | 3.4 km | MPC · JPL |
| 67012 | 1999 XL_{124} | — | December 7, 1999 | Catalina | CSS | GEF | 4.2 km | MPC · JPL |
| 67013 | 1999 XY_{124} | — | December 7, 1999 | Catalina | CSS | · | 4.7 km | MPC · JPL |
| 67014 | 1999 XJ_{125} | — | December 7, 1999 | Catalina | CSS | EOS | 4.9 km | MPC · JPL |
| 67015 | 1999 XB_{126} | — | December 7, 1999 | Catalina | CSS | · | 5.4 km | MPC · JPL |
| 67016 | 1999 XL_{130} | — | December 12, 1999 | Socorro | LINEAR | · | 4.2 km | MPC · JPL |
| 67017 | 1999 XV_{132} | — | December 12, 1999 | Socorro | LINEAR | · | 7.5 km | MPC · JPL |
| 67018 | 1999 XY_{133} | — | December 12, 1999 | Socorro | LINEAR | · | 9.7 km | MPC · JPL |
| 67019 Hlohovec | 1999 XF_{137} | Hlohovec | December 13, 1999 | Modra | Kornoš, L., Tóth | V | 1.5 km | MPC · JPL |
| 67020 | 1999 XS_{137} | — | December 11, 1999 | Uccle | T. Pauwels | SYL · CYB | 12 km | MPC · JPL |
| 67021 | 1999 XG_{143} | — | December 15, 1999 | Fountain Hills | C. W. Juels | (5) | 3.8 km | MPC · JPL |
| 67022 | 1999 XO_{147} | — | December 7, 1999 | Kitt Peak | Spacewatch | KOR | 2.8 km | MPC · JPL |
| 67023 | 1999 XP_{152} | — | December 13, 1999 | Anderson Mesa | LONEOS | EUN | 3.3 km | MPC · JPL |
| 67024 | 1999 XS_{153} | — | December 7, 1999 | Socorro | LINEAR | · | 9.3 km | MPC · JPL |
| 67025 | 1999 XU_{155} | — | December 8, 1999 | Socorro | LINEAR | · | 4.1 km | MPC · JPL |
| 67026 | 1999 XX_{155} | — | December 8, 1999 | Socorro | LINEAR | · | 13 km | MPC · JPL |
| 67027 | 1999 XE_{164} | — | December 8, 1999 | Socorro | LINEAR | · | 4.6 km | MPC · JPL |
| 67028 | 1999 XH_{164} | — | December 8, 1999 | Socorro | LINEAR | · | 5.2 km | MPC · JPL |
| 67029 | 1999 XH_{166} | — | December 10, 1999 | Socorro | LINEAR | ADE | 9.8 km | MPC · JPL |
| 67030 | 1999 XJ_{166} | — | December 10, 1999 | Socorro | LINEAR | · | 8.8 km | MPC · JPL |
| 67031 | 1999 XX_{166} | — | December 10, 1999 | Socorro | LINEAR | · | 3.9 km | MPC · JPL |
| 67032 | 1999 XV_{167} | — | December 10, 1999 | Socorro | LINEAR | EOS | 5.2 km | MPC · JPL |
| 67033 | 1999 XN_{169} | — | December 10, 1999 | Socorro | LINEAR | · | 7.0 km | MPC · JPL |
| 67034 | 1999 XN_{170} | — | December 10, 1999 | Socorro | LINEAR | EOS | 6.7 km | MPC · JPL |
| 67035 | 1999 XO_{171} | — | December 10, 1999 | Socorro | LINEAR | · | 4.0 km | MPC · JPL |
| 67036 | 1999 XS_{171} | — | December 10, 1999 | Socorro | LINEAR | · | 7.0 km | MPC · JPL |
| 67037 | 1999 XC_{181} | — | December 12, 1999 | Socorro | LINEAR | · | 10 km | MPC · JPL |
| 67038 | 1999 XC_{182} | — | December 12, 1999 | Socorro | LINEAR | · | 5.3 km | MPC · JPL |
| 67039 | 1999 XT_{183} | — | December 12, 1999 | Socorro | LINEAR | EOS | 6.7 km | MPC · JPL |
| 67040 | 1999 XL_{187} | — | December 12, 1999 | Socorro | LINEAR | · | 2.8 km | MPC · JPL |
| 67041 | 1999 XR_{187} | — | December 12, 1999 | Socorro | LINEAR | · | 8.2 km | MPC · JPL |
| 67042 | 1999 XF_{188} | — | December 12, 1999 | Socorro | LINEAR | EOS | 5.0 km | MPC · JPL |
| 67043 | 1999 XS_{188} | — | December 12, 1999 | Socorro | LINEAR | · | 6.4 km | MPC · JPL |
| 67044 | 1999 XF_{189} | — | December 12, 1999 | Socorro | LINEAR | · | 4.3 km | MPC · JPL |
| 67045 | 1999 XZ_{191} | — | December 12, 1999 | Socorro | LINEAR | · | 6.4 km | MPC · JPL |
| 67046 | 1999 XX_{192} | — | December 12, 1999 | Socorro | LINEAR | EOS | 5.8 km | MPC · JPL |
| 67047 | 1999 XU_{193} | — | December 12, 1999 | Socorro | LINEAR | EOS | 5.9 km | MPC · JPL |
| 67048 | 1999 XJ_{203} | — | December 12, 1999 | Socorro | LINEAR | · | 8.3 km | MPC · JPL |
| 67049 | 1999 XB_{204} | — | December 12, 1999 | Socorro | LINEAR | · | 4.0 km | MPC · JPL |
| 67050 | 1999 XT_{204} | — | December 12, 1999 | Socorro | LINEAR | · | 7.0 km | MPC · JPL |
| 67051 | 1999 XP_{206} | — | December 12, 1999 | Socorro | LINEAR | EOS | 5.0 km | MPC · JPL |
| 67052 | 1999 XY_{207} | — | December 13, 1999 | Socorro | LINEAR | · | 6.6 km | MPC · JPL |
| 67053 | 1999 XZ_{207} | — | December 13, 1999 | Socorro | LINEAR | · | 4.8 km | MPC · JPL |
| 67054 | 1999 XR_{209} | — | December 13, 1999 | Socorro | LINEAR | TIR | 6.8 km | MPC · JPL |
| 67055 | 1999 XC_{211} | — | December 13, 1999 | Socorro | LINEAR | · | 9.9 km | MPC · JPL |
| 67056 | 1999 XL_{212} | — | December 14, 1999 | Socorro | LINEAR | · | 3.2 km | MPC · JPL |
| 67057 | 1999 XS_{229} | — | December 7, 1999 | Catalina | CSS | GEF | 3.4 km | MPC · JPL |
| 67058 | 1999 XY_{229} | — | December 7, 1999 | Catalina | CSS | EUN | 5.8 km | MPC · JPL |
| 67059 | 1999 XZ_{229} | — | December 7, 1999 | Anderson Mesa | LONEOS | EUN | 6.8 km | MPC · JPL |
| 67060 | 1999 XD_{230} | — | December 7, 1999 | Anderson Mesa | LONEOS | · | 3.9 km | MPC · JPL |
| 67061 | 1999 XK_{233} | — | December 3, 1999 | Socorro | LINEAR | · | 3.9 km | MPC · JPL |
| 67062 | 1999 XU_{233} | — | December 4, 1999 | Anderson Mesa | LONEOS | EOS | 6.2 km | MPC · JPL |
| 67063 | 1999 XM_{244} | — | December 4, 1999 | Catalina | CSS | AGN | 3.0 km | MPC · JPL |
| 67064 | 1999 XM_{260} | — | December 7, 1999 | Catalina | CSS | · | 6.6 km | MPC · JPL |
| 67065 | 1999 XW_{261} | — | December 3, 1999 | Socorro | LINEAR | L4 | 20 km | MPC · JPL |
| 67066 | 1999 YO | — | December 16, 1999 | Socorro | LINEAR | H | 1.3 km | MPC · JPL |
| 67067 | 1999 YC_{6} | — | December 30, 1999 | Socorro | LINEAR | · | 8.2 km | MPC · JPL |
| 67068 | 1999 YO_{25} | — | December 27, 1999 | Kitt Peak | Spacewatch | · | 7.2 km | MPC · JPL |
| 67069 | 2000 AQ_{1} | — | January 2, 2000 | Kleť | Kleť | ADE | 9.3 km | MPC · JPL |
| 67070 Rinaldi | 2000 AZ_{2} | Rinaldi | January 1, 2000 | San Marcello | L. Tesi, A. Boattini | · | 4.7 km | MPC · JPL |
| 67071 | 2000 AA_{7} | — | January 2, 2000 | Socorro | LINEAR | · | 10 km | MPC · JPL |
| 67072 | 2000 AY_{11} | — | January 3, 2000 | Socorro | LINEAR | EUN | 3.8 km | MPC · JPL |
| 67073 | 2000 AG_{14} | — | January 3, 2000 | Socorro | LINEAR | · | 2.7 km | MPC · JPL |
| 67074 | 2000 AC_{15} | — | January 3, 2000 | Socorro | LINEAR | · | 8.0 km | MPC · JPL |
| 67075 | 2000 AD_{15} | — | January 3, 2000 | Socorro | LINEAR | · | 3.1 km | MPC · JPL |
| 67076 | 2000 AC_{19} | — | January 3, 2000 | Socorro | LINEAR | · | 8.1 km | MPC · JPL |
| 67077 | 2000 AQ_{21} | — | January 3, 2000 | Socorro | LINEAR | (5) | 3.0 km | MPC · JPL |
| 67078 | 2000 AW_{26} | — | January 3, 2000 | Socorro | LINEAR | DOR | 7.7 km | MPC · JPL |
| 67079 | 2000 AL_{27} | — | January 3, 2000 | Socorro | LINEAR | · | 9.8 km | MPC · JPL |
| 67080 | 2000 AC_{29} | — | January 3, 2000 | Socorro | LINEAR | · | 8.5 km | MPC · JPL |
| 67081 | 2000 AL_{31} | — | January 3, 2000 | Socorro | LINEAR | · | 7.7 km | MPC · JPL |
| 67082 | 2000 AY_{32} | — | January 3, 2000 | Socorro | LINEAR | · | 11 km | MPC · JPL |
| 67083 | 2000 AW_{34} | — | January 3, 2000 | Socorro | LINEAR | · | 12 km | MPC · JPL |
| 67084 | 2000 AY_{38} | — | January 3, 2000 | Socorro | LINEAR | · | 2.7 km | MPC · JPL |
| 67085 Oppenheimer | 2000 AG_{42} | Oppenheimer | January 4, 2000 | Gnosca | S. Sposetti | · | 1.6 km | MPC · JPL |
| 67086 | 2000 AY_{45} | — | January 3, 2000 | Socorro | LINEAR | · | 8.0 km | MPC · JPL |
| 67087 | 2000 AL_{51} | — | January 4, 2000 | Socorro | LINEAR | · | 5.3 km | MPC · JPL |
| 67088 | 2000 AN_{51} | — | January 4, 2000 | Socorro | LINEAR | · | 4.1 km | MPC · JPL |
| 67089 | 2000 AW_{51} | — | January 4, 2000 | Socorro | LINEAR | · | 3.4 km | MPC · JPL |
| 67090 | 2000 AC_{52} | — | January 4, 2000 | Socorro | LINEAR | slow | 4.8 km | MPC · JPL |
| 67091 | 2000 AJ_{52} | — | January 4, 2000 | Socorro | LINEAR | · | 3.0 km | MPC · JPL |
| 67092 | 2000 AA_{53} | — | January 4, 2000 | Socorro | LINEAR | · | 2.3 km | MPC · JPL |
| 67093 | 2000 AY_{53} | — | January 4, 2000 | Socorro | LINEAR | EOS | 4.4 km | MPC · JPL |
| 67094 | 2000 AC_{62} | — | January 4, 2000 | Socorro | LINEAR | fast | 7.7 km | MPC · JPL |
| 67095 | 2000 AU_{67} | — | January 4, 2000 | Socorro | LINEAR | CYB | 8.8 km | MPC · JPL |
| 67096 | 2000 AL_{70} | — | January 5, 2000 | Socorro | LINEAR | (5) | 3.3 km | MPC · JPL |
| 67097 | 2000 AF_{71} | — | January 5, 2000 | Socorro | LINEAR | · | 3.3 km | MPC · JPL |
| 67098 | 2000 AN_{74} | — | January 5, 2000 | Socorro | LINEAR | EOS | 4.1 km | MPC · JPL |
| 67099 | 2000 AK_{76} | — | January 5, 2000 | Socorro | LINEAR | · | 8.4 km | MPC · JPL |
| 67100 | 2000 AL_{76} | — | January 5, 2000 | Socorro | LINEAR | · | 15 km | MPC · JPL |

== 67101–67200 ==
back to top

| Designation | | | Discovery | | | Properties | | Ref |
| Permanent | Provisional | Named after | Date | Site | Discoverer(s) | Category | Diam. | Ref |
|---|---|---|---|---|---|---|---|---|
| 67101 | 2000 AW_{78} | — | January 5, 2000 | Socorro | LINEAR | · | 3.0 km | MPC · JPL |
| 67102 | 2000 AB_{80} | — | January 5, 2000 | Socorro | LINEAR | URS | 10 km | MPC · JPL |
| 67103 | 2000 AC_{80} | — | January 5, 2000 | Socorro | LINEAR | · | 4.2 km | MPC · JPL |
| 67104 | 2000 AH_{81} | — | January 5, 2000 | Socorro | LINEAR | EOS | 5.2 km | MPC · JPL |
| 67105 | 2000 AV_{91} | — | January 5, 2000 | Socorro | LINEAR | EOS | 6.9 km | MPC · JPL |
| 67106 | 2000 AF_{92} | — | January 5, 2000 | Socorro | LINEAR | · | 10 km | MPC · JPL |
| 67107 | 2000 AU_{93} | — | January 7, 2000 | Socorro | LINEAR | · | 3.3 km | MPC · JPL |
| 67108 | 2000 AB_{100} | — | January 5, 2000 | Socorro | LINEAR | · | 9.1 km | MPC · JPL |
| 67109 | 2000 AC_{100} | — | January 5, 2000 | Socorro | LINEAR | · | 3.3 km | MPC · JPL |
| 67110 | 2000 AF_{101} | — | January 5, 2000 | Socorro | LINEAR | · | 3.5 km | MPC · JPL |
| 67111 | 2000 AL_{101} | — | January 5, 2000 | Socorro | LINEAR | (5) | 3.3 km | MPC · JPL |
| 67112 | 2000 AA_{104} | — | January 5, 2000 | Socorro | LINEAR | · | 15 km | MPC · JPL |
| 67113 | 2000 AC_{114} | — | January 5, 2000 | Socorro | LINEAR | · | 7.6 km | MPC · JPL |
| 67114 | 2000 AT_{115} | — | January 5, 2000 | Socorro | LINEAR | · | 10 km | MPC · JPL |
| 67115 | 2000 AF_{116} | — | January 5, 2000 | Socorro | LINEAR | · | 6.5 km | MPC · JPL |
| 67116 | 2000 AY_{116} | — | January 5, 2000 | Socorro | LINEAR | · | 3.0 km | MPC · JPL |
| 67117 | 2000 AA_{117} | — | January 5, 2000 | Socorro | LINEAR | · | 6.1 km | MPC · JPL |
| 67118 | 2000 AB_{120} | — | January 5, 2000 | Socorro | LINEAR | · | 2.8 km | MPC · JPL |
| 67119 | 2000 AP_{122} | — | January 5, 2000 | Socorro | LINEAR | · | 1.6 km | MPC · JPL |
| 67120 | 2000 AY_{122} | — | January 5, 2000 | Socorro | LINEAR | · | 5.5 km | MPC · JPL |
| 67121 | 2000 AE_{123} | — | January 5, 2000 | Socorro | LINEAR | · | 4.6 km | MPC · JPL |
| 67122 | 2000 AY_{123} | — | January 5, 2000 | Socorro | LINEAR | · | 10 km | MPC · JPL |
| 67123 | 2000 AL_{124} | — | January 5, 2000 | Socorro | LINEAR | · | 11 km | MPC · JPL |
| 67124 | 2000 AY_{127} | — | January 5, 2000 | Socorro | LINEAR | · | 6.6 km | MPC · JPL |
| 67125 | 2000 AC_{131} | — | January 6, 2000 | Socorro | LINEAR | THM | 4.9 km | MPC · JPL |
| 67126 | 2000 AS_{133} | — | January 4, 2000 | Socorro | LINEAR | · | 5.1 km | MPC · JPL |
| 67127 | 2000 AN_{136} | — | January 4, 2000 | Socorro | LINEAR | · | 5.0 km | MPC · JPL |
| 67128 | 2000 AQ_{139} | — | January 5, 2000 | Socorro | LINEAR | EOS | 5.6 km | MPC · JPL |
| 67129 | 2000 AA_{140} | — | January 5, 2000 | Socorro | LINEAR | · | 2.2 km | MPC · JPL |
| 67130 | 2000 AA_{141} | — | January 5, 2000 | Socorro | LINEAR | EOS | 7.0 km | MPC · JPL |
| 67131 | 2000 AC_{143} | — | January 5, 2000 | Socorro | LINEAR | · | 6.3 km | MPC · JPL |
| 67132 | 2000 AD_{145} | — | January 6, 2000 | Socorro | LINEAR | EOS | 5.2 km | MPC · JPL |
| 67133 | 2000 AL_{145} | — | January 6, 2000 | Socorro | LINEAR | URS | 7.5 km | MPC · JPL |
| 67134 | 2000 AB_{149} | — | January 7, 2000 | Socorro | LINEAR | URS | 14 km | MPC · JPL |
| 67135 | 2000 AD_{152} | — | January 8, 2000 | Socorro | LINEAR | · | 3.8 km | MPC · JPL |
| 67136 | 2000 AG_{154} | — | January 2, 2000 | Socorro | LINEAR | EOS | 5.4 km | MPC · JPL |
| 67137 | 2000 AX_{155} | — | January 3, 2000 | Socorro | LINEAR | · | 7.8 km | MPC · JPL |
| 67138 | 2000 AF_{165} | — | January 8, 2000 | Socorro | LINEAR | KOR | 6.3 km | MPC · JPL |
| 67139 | 2000 AK_{165} | — | January 8, 2000 | Socorro | LINEAR | · | 3.9 km | MPC · JPL |
| 67140 | 2000 AD_{166} | — | January 8, 2000 | Socorro | LINEAR | · | 13 km | MPC · JPL |
| 67141 | 2000 AC_{169} | — | January 7, 2000 | Socorro | LINEAR | · | 4.6 km | MPC · JPL |
| 67142 | 2000 AV_{169} | — | January 7, 2000 | Socorro | LINEAR | · | 4.8 km | MPC · JPL |
| 67143 | 2000 AY_{170} | — | January 7, 2000 | Socorro | LINEAR | · | 3.8 km | MPC · JPL |
| 67144 | 2000 AO_{171} | — | January 7, 2000 | Socorro | LINEAR | (5) | 3.0 km | MPC · JPL |
| 67145 | 2000 AW_{173} | — | January 7, 2000 | Socorro | LINEAR | · | 4.0 km | MPC · JPL |
| 67146 | 2000 AN_{175} | — | January 7, 2000 | Socorro | LINEAR | · | 4.6 km | MPC · JPL |
| 67147 | 2000 AF_{176} | — | January 7, 2000 | Socorro | LINEAR | EOS | 4.7 km | MPC · JPL |
| 67148 | 2000 AG_{186} | — | January 8, 2000 | Socorro | LINEAR | · | 6.8 km | MPC · JPL |
| 67149 | 2000 AA_{187} | — | January 8, 2000 | Socorro | LINEAR | · | 5.7 km | MPC · JPL |
| 67150 | 2000 AK_{187} | — | January 8, 2000 | Socorro | LINEAR | · | 3.6 km | MPC · JPL |
| 67151 | 2000 AA_{188} | — | January 8, 2000 | Socorro | LINEAR | (18466) | 5.1 km | MPC · JPL |
| 67152 | 2000 AM_{189} | — | January 8, 2000 | Socorro | LINEAR | · | 7.6 km | MPC · JPL |
| 67153 | 2000 AP_{189} | — | January 8, 2000 | Socorro | LINEAR | EUN | 3.1 km | MPC · JPL |
| 67154 | 2000 AJ_{194} | — | January 8, 2000 | Socorro | LINEAR | · | 16 km | MPC · JPL |
| 67155 | 2000 AK_{194} | — | January 8, 2000 | Socorro | LINEAR | · | 11 km | MPC · JPL |
| 67156 | 2000 AY_{197} | — | January 8, 2000 | Socorro | LINEAR | CYB | 8.8 km | MPC · JPL |
| 67157 | 2000 AR_{198} | — | January 8, 2000 | Socorro | LINEAR | · | 14 km | MPC · JPL |
| 67158 | 2000 AX_{199} | — | January 9, 2000 | Socorro | LINEAR | EUN | 4.9 km | MPC · JPL |
| 67159 | 2000 AC_{200} | — | January 9, 2000 | Socorro | LINEAR | · | 3.4 km | MPC · JPL |
| 67160 | 2000 AT_{200} | — | January 9, 2000 | Socorro | LINEAR | slow | 4.9 km | MPC · JPL |
| 67161 | 2000 AA_{205} | — | January 8, 2000 | Nachi-Katsuura | Y. Shimizu, T. Urata | EOS | 5.5 km | MPC · JPL |
| 67162 | 2000 AR_{217} | — | January 8, 2000 | Kitt Peak | Spacewatch | · | 2.3 km | MPC · JPL |
| 67163 | 2000 AU_{228} | — | January 7, 2000 | Anderson Mesa | LONEOS | · | 6.0 km | MPC · JPL |
| 67164 | 2000 AJ_{229} | — | January 3, 2000 | Socorro | LINEAR | MAR | 5.2 km | MPC · JPL |
| 67165 | 2000 AW_{230} | — | January 4, 2000 | Kitt Peak | Spacewatch | · | 4.9 km | MPC · JPL |
| 67166 | 2000 AZ_{232} | — | January 4, 2000 | Socorro | LINEAR | · | 10 km | MPC · JPL |
| 67167 | 2000 AM_{235} | — | January 5, 2000 | Socorro | LINEAR | THM | 4.3 km | MPC · JPL |
| 67168 | 2000 AX_{237} | — | January 6, 2000 | Socorro | LINEAR | · | 12 km | MPC · JPL |
| 67169 | 2000 AV_{241} | — | January 7, 2000 | Anderson Mesa | LONEOS | CYB | 13 km | MPC · JPL |
| 67170 | 2000 AC_{244} | — | January 8, 2000 | Socorro | LINEAR | URS | 8.6 km | MPC · JPL |
| 67171 | 2000 AQ_{244} | — | January 8, 2000 | Socorro | LINEAR | · | 4.0 km | MPC · JPL |
| 67172 | 2000 BH_{16} | — | January 30, 2000 | Socorro | LINEAR | DOR | 7.7 km | MPC · JPL |
| 67173 | 2000 BR_{17} | — | January 30, 2000 | Socorro | LINEAR | · | 5.5 km | MPC · JPL |
| 67174 | 2000 BS_{18} | — | January 30, 2000 | Socorro | LINEAR | · | 2.9 km | MPC · JPL |
| 67175 | 2000 BA_{19} | — | January 31, 2000 | Socorro | LINEAR | H · slow | 2.5 km | MPC · JPL |
| 67176 | 2000 BP_{20} | — | January 26, 2000 | Kitt Peak | Spacewatch | HYG | 6.1 km | MPC · JPL |
| 67177 | 2000 BM_{22} | — | January 30, 2000 | Kitt Peak | Spacewatch | THM | 5.4 km | MPC · JPL |
| 67178 | 2000 BE_{25} | — | January 30, 2000 | Socorro | LINEAR | AEG | 9.8 km | MPC · JPL |
| 67179 | 2000 BQ_{25} | — | January 30, 2000 | Socorro | LINEAR | · | 4.8 km | MPC · JPL |
| 67180 | 2000 BJ_{27} | — | January 30, 2000 | Socorro | LINEAR | · | 4.2 km | MPC · JPL |
| 67181 | 2000 BZ_{27} | — | January 30, 2000 | Socorro | LINEAR | THM | 8.1 km | MPC · JPL |
| 67182 | 2000 BQ_{28} | — | January 29, 2000 | Socorro | LINEAR | · | 6.9 km | MPC · JPL |
| 67183 | 2000 BT_{33} | — | January 30, 2000 | Catalina | CSS | · | 7.0 km | MPC · JPL |
| 67184 | 2000 CS_{4} | — | February 2, 2000 | Socorro | LINEAR | · | 6.2 km | MPC · JPL |
| 67185 | 2000 CR_{6} | — | February 2, 2000 | Socorro | LINEAR | · | 5.3 km | MPC · JPL |
| 67186 | 2000 CF_{25} | — | February 2, 2000 | Socorro | LINEAR | · | 5.2 km | MPC · JPL |
| 67187 | 2000 CL_{27} | — | February 2, 2000 | Socorro | LINEAR | · | 3.9 km | MPC · JPL |
| 67188 | 2000 CV_{28} | — | February 2, 2000 | Socorro | LINEAR | NYS | 2.7 km | MPC · JPL |
| 67189 | 2000 CT_{30} | — | February 2, 2000 | Socorro | LINEAR | · | 6.9 km | MPC · JPL |
| 67190 | 2000 CB_{32} | — | February 2, 2000 | Socorro | LINEAR | HYG | 8.9 km | MPC · JPL |
| 67191 | 2000 CB_{38} | — | February 3, 2000 | Socorro | LINEAR | HYG | 8.9 km | MPC · JPL |
| 67192 | 2000 CH_{49} | — | February 2, 2000 | Socorro | LINEAR | · | 5.0 km | MPC · JPL |
| 67193 | 2000 CY_{57} | — | February 5, 2000 | Socorro | LINEAR | · | 13 km | MPC · JPL |
| 67194 | 2000 CA_{61} | — | February 2, 2000 | Socorro | LINEAR | · | 4.6 km | MPC · JPL |
| 67195 | 2000 CT_{66} | — | February 6, 2000 | Socorro | LINEAR | · | 5.7 km | MPC · JPL |
| 67196 | 2000 CE_{75} | — | February 3, 2000 | Socorro | LINEAR | · | 2.6 km | MPC · JPL |
| 67197 | 2000 CU_{79} | — | February 8, 2000 | Kitt Peak | Spacewatch | THM | 6.5 km | MPC · JPL |
| 67198 | 2000 CR_{91} | — | February 6, 2000 | Socorro | LINEAR | · | 1.9 km | MPC · JPL |
| 67199 | 2000 CP_{96} | — | February 6, 2000 | Socorro | LINEAR | · | 12 km | MPC · JPL |
| 67200 | 2000 CG_{97} | — | February 12, 2000 | Oaxaca | Roe, J. M. | · | 7.3 km | MPC · JPL |

== 67201–67300 ==
back to top

| Designation | | | Discovery | | | Properties | | Ref |
| Permanent | Provisional | Named after | Date | Site | Discoverer(s) | Category | Diam. | Ref |
|---|---|---|---|---|---|---|---|---|
| 67201 | 2000 CR_{103} | — | February 8, 2000 | Socorro | LINEAR | · | 3.3 km | MPC · JPL |
| 67202 | 2000 CJ_{108} | — | February 5, 2000 | Catalina | CSS | TIR | 8.0 km | MPC · JPL |
| 67203 | 2000 CQ_{124} | — | February 3, 2000 | Socorro | LINEAR | 3:2 | 11 km | MPC · JPL |
| 67204 | 2000 DJ_{4} | — | February 28, 2000 | Socorro | LINEAR | · | 3.8 km | MPC · JPL |
| 67205 | 2000 DB_{7} | — | February 29, 2000 | Oaxaca | Roe, J. M. | · | 7.4 km | MPC · JPL |
| 67206 | 2000 DU_{15} | — | February 27, 2000 | Catalina | CSS | · | 4.1 km | MPC · JPL |
| 67207 | 2000 DJ_{19} | — | February 29, 2000 | Socorro | LINEAR | THM · | 6.6 km | MPC · JPL |
| 67208 | 2000 DQ_{20} | — | February 29, 2000 | Socorro | LINEAR | · | 11 km | MPC · JPL |
| 67209 | 2000 DN_{26} | — | February 29, 2000 | Socorro | LINEAR | HOF | 5.1 km | MPC · JPL |
| 67210 | 2000 DF_{29} | — | February 29, 2000 | Socorro | LINEAR | HYG | 9.8 km | MPC · JPL |
| 67211 | 2000 DT_{33} | — | February 29, 2000 | Socorro | LINEAR | · | 2.5 km | MPC · JPL |
| 67212 | 2000 DY_{35} | — | February 29, 2000 | Socorro | LINEAR | · | 1.8 km | MPC · JPL |
| 67213 | 2000 DN_{36} | — | February 29, 2000 | Socorro | LINEAR | · | 4.2 km | MPC · JPL |
| 67214 | 2000 DC_{47} | — | February 29, 2000 | Socorro | LINEAR | THM | 6.0 km | MPC · JPL |
| 67215 | 2000 DL_{53} | — | February 29, 2000 | Socorro | LINEAR | · | 9.8 km | MPC · JPL |
| 67216 | 2000 DU_{56} | — | February 29, 2000 | Socorro | LINEAR | · | 8.8 km | MPC · JPL |
| 67217 | 2000 DL_{57} | — | February 29, 2000 | Socorro | LINEAR | KOR | 3.1 km | MPC · JPL |
| 67218 | 2000 DF_{62} | — | February 29, 2000 | Socorro | LINEAR | CYB | 10 km | MPC · JPL |
| 67219 | 2000 DE_{64} | — | February 29, 2000 | Socorro | LINEAR | · | 2.4 km | MPC · JPL |
| 67220 | 2000 DH_{67} | — | February 29, 2000 | Socorro | LINEAR | ADE · | 2.9 km | MPC · JPL |
| 67221 | 2000 DP_{73} | — | February 29, 2000 | Socorro | LINEAR | NYS | 2.7 km | MPC · JPL |
| 67222 | 2000 DA_{75} | — | February 29, 2000 | Socorro | LINEAR | · | 1.9 km | MPC · JPL |
| 67223 | 2000 DC_{81} | — | February 28, 2000 | Socorro | LINEAR | V | 1.8 km | MPC · JPL |
| 67224 | 2000 DB_{95} | — | February 28, 2000 | Socorro | LINEAR | HOF | 5.8 km | MPC · JPL |
| 67225 | 2000 DM_{101} | — | February 29, 2000 | Socorro | LINEAR | GEF | 3.5 km | MPC · JPL |
| 67226 | 2000 DB_{102} | — | February 29, 2000 | Socorro | LINEAR | CYB | 20 km | MPC · JPL |
| 67227 | 2000 DV_{102} | — | February 29, 2000 | Socorro | LINEAR | · | 11 km | MPC · JPL |
| 67228 | 2000 DY_{107} | — | February 28, 2000 | Socorro | LINEAR | · | 10 km | MPC · JPL |
| 67229 | 2000 DX_{108} | — | February 29, 2000 | Socorro | LINEAR | · | 8.9 km | MPC · JPL |
| 67230 | 2000 EB | — | March 12, 2000 | Socorro | LINEAR | PHO | 3.3 km | MPC · JPL |
| 67231 | 2000 EH | — | March 1, 2000 | Kitt Peak | Spacewatch | · | 4.9 km | MPC · JPL |
| 67232 | 2000 EB_{3} | — | March 3, 2000 | Socorro | LINEAR | · | 4.4 km | MPC · JPL |
| 67233 | 2000 EP_{11} | — | March 4, 2000 | Socorro | LINEAR | · | 11 km | MPC · JPL |
| 67234 | 2000 ED_{12} | — | March 4, 2000 | Socorro | LINEAR | · | 6.4 km | MPC · JPL |
| 67235 Fairbank | 2000 EJ_{15} | Fairbank | March 5, 2000 | Gnosca | S. Sposetti | · | 3.9 km | MPC · JPL |
| 67236 | 2000 EH_{19} | — | March 5, 2000 | Socorro | LINEAR | · | 1.6 km | MPC · JPL |
| 67237 | 2000 EA_{24} | — | March 8, 2000 | Kitt Peak | Spacewatch | · | 1.3 km | MPC · JPL |
| 67238 | 2000 ER_{26} | — | March 8, 2000 | Socorro | LINEAR | H | 960 m | MPC · JPL |
| 67239 | 2000 ER_{30} | — | March 5, 2000 | Socorro | LINEAR | V | 1.8 km | MPC · JPL |
| 67240 | 2000 EF_{39} | — | March 8, 2000 | Socorro | LINEAR | THM | 6.1 km | MPC · JPL |
| 67241 | 2000 EZ_{44} | — | March 9, 2000 | Socorro | LINEAR | · | 3.8 km | MPC · JPL |
| 67242 | 2000 EG_{47} | — | March 9, 2000 | Socorro | LINEAR | THM | 5.9 km | MPC · JPL |
| 67243 | 2000 ED_{57} | — | March 8, 2000 | Socorro | LINEAR | · | 9.8 km | MPC · JPL |
| 67244 | 2000 EH_{58} | — | March 8, 2000 | Socorro | LINEAR | CYB | 13 km | MPC · JPL |
| 67245 | 2000 EP_{60} | — | March 10, 2000 | Socorro | LINEAR | · | 5.8 km | MPC · JPL |
| 67246 | 2000 ED_{70} | — | March 10, 2000 | Socorro | LINEAR | HIL · 3:2 | 23 km | MPC · JPL |
| 67247 | 2000 EA_{82} | — | March 5, 2000 | Socorro | LINEAR | · | 1.9 km | MPC · JPL |
| 67248 | 2000 EY_{87} | — | March 9, 2000 | Socorro | LINEAR | · | 14 km | MPC · JPL |
| 67249 | 2000 EJ_{96} | — | March 11, 2000 | Socorro | LINEAR | · | 4.6 km | MPC · JPL |
| 67250 | 2000 EH_{97} | — | March 10, 2000 | Socorro | LINEAR | · | 9.1 km | MPC · JPL |
| 67251 | 2000 EB_{103} | — | March 9, 2000 | Socorro | LINEAR | · | 4.4 km | MPC · JPL |
| 67252 | 2000 ET_{104} | — | March 14, 2000 | Socorro | LINEAR | V | 1.9 km | MPC · JPL |
| 67253 | 2000 EA_{106} | — | March 11, 2000 | Anderson Mesa | LONEOS | · | 2.9 km | MPC · JPL |
| 67254 | 2000 EV_{108} | — | March 8, 2000 | Kitt Peak | Spacewatch | · | 6.8 km | MPC · JPL |
| 67255 | 2000 ET_{109} | — | March 8, 2000 | Haleakala | NEAT | TIR | 6.6 km | MPC · JPL |
| 67256 | 2000 EA_{113} | — | March 9, 2000 | Socorro | LINEAR | · | 2.2 km | MPC · JPL |
| 67257 | 2000 EY_{117} | — | March 11, 2000 | Anderson Mesa | LONEOS | KRM | 5.9 km | MPC · JPL |
| 67258 | 2000 EX_{119} | — | March 11, 2000 | Anderson Mesa | LONEOS | · | 5.3 km | MPC · JPL |
| 67259 | 2000 EA_{121} | — | March 11, 2000 | Anderson Mesa | LONEOS | · | 11 km | MPC · JPL |
| 67260 | 2000 EJ_{127} | — | March 11, 2000 | Anderson Mesa | LONEOS | · | 3.5 km | MPC · JPL |
| 67261 | 2000 EO_{127} | — | March 11, 2000 | Anderson Mesa | LONEOS | EUP | 11 km | MPC · JPL |
| 67262 | 2000 EU_{136} | — | March 12, 2000 | Socorro | LINEAR | · | 3.2 km | MPC · JPL |
| 67263 | 2000 ER_{150} | — | March 5, 2000 | Haleakala | NEAT | KOR | 3.7 km | MPC · JPL |
| 67264 | 2000 EM_{153} | — | March 6, 2000 | Haleakala | NEAT | · | 3.1 km | MPC · JPL |
| 67265 | 2000 EX_{158} | — | March 12, 2000 | Anderson Mesa | LONEOS | · | 1.6 km | MPC · JPL |
| 67266 | 2000 EC_{163} | — | March 3, 2000 | Socorro | LINEAR | · | 1.4 km | MPC · JPL |
| 67267 | 2000 EE_{183} | — | March 5, 2000 | Socorro | LINEAR | · | 6.1 km | MPC · JPL |
| 67268 | 2000 EC_{184} | — | March 5, 2000 | Socorro | LINEAR | 615 | 4.0 km | MPC · JPL |
| 67269 | 2000 FF_{5} | — | March 29, 2000 | Oizumi | T. Kobayashi | PHO | 5.2 km | MPC · JPL |
| 67270 | 2000 FJ_{12} | — | March 28, 2000 | Socorro | LINEAR | · | 10 km | MPC · JPL |
| 67271 | 2000 FW_{19} | — | March 29, 2000 | Socorro | LINEAR | EOS | 5.8 km | MPC · JPL |
| 67272 | 2000 FQ_{27} | — | March 27, 2000 | Anderson Mesa | LONEOS | KOR | 3.7 km | MPC · JPL |
| 67273 | 2000 FZ_{32} | — | March 29, 2000 | Socorro | LINEAR | EUN | 3.3 km | MPC · JPL |
| 67274 | 2000 FA_{41} | — | March 29, 2000 | Socorro | LINEAR | fast | 8.5 km | MPC · JPL |
| 67275 | 2000 FU_{41} | — | March 29, 2000 | Socorro | LINEAR | · | 2.7 km | MPC · JPL |
| 67276 | 2000 FJ_{42} | — | March 29, 2000 | Socorro | LINEAR | NEM | 5.2 km | MPC · JPL |
| 67277 | 2000 FT_{43} | — | March 29, 2000 | Socorro | LINEAR | · | 2.8 km | MPC · JPL |
| 67278 | 2000 FF_{44} | — | March 29, 2000 | Socorro | LINEAR | · | 1.6 km | MPC · JPL |
| 67279 | 2000 FD_{45} | — | March 29, 2000 | Socorro | LINEAR | · | 980 m | MPC · JPL |
| 67280 | 2000 FL_{48} | — | March 29, 2000 | Socorro | LINEAR | · | 3.3 km | MPC · JPL |
| 67281 | 2000 FV_{60} | — | March 29, 2000 | Socorro | LINEAR | V | 1.2 km | MPC · JPL |
| 67282 | 2000 FR_{65} | — | March 27, 2000 | Anderson Mesa | LONEOS | · | 5.3 km | MPC · JPL |
| 67283 | 2000 GN | — | April 2, 2000 | Prescott | P. G. Comba | · | 2.8 km | MPC · JPL |
| 67284 | 2000 GD_{1} | — | April 2, 2000 | Socorro | LINEAR | H | 1.4 km | MPC · JPL |
| 67285 | 2000 GH_{2} | — | April 5, 2000 | Prescott | P. G. Comba | KOR | 2.8 km | MPC · JPL |
| 67286 | 2000 GT_{7} | — | April 4, 2000 | Socorro | LINEAR | · | 4.4 km | MPC · JPL |
| 67287 | 2000 GP_{23} | — | April 5, 2000 | Socorro | LINEAR | V | 1.6 km | MPC · JPL |
| 67288 | 2000 GN_{42} | — | April 5, 2000 | Socorro | LINEAR | · | 2.6 km | MPC · JPL |
| 67289 | 2000 GQ_{47} | — | April 5, 2000 | Socorro | LINEAR | · | 1.7 km | MPC · JPL |
| 67290 | 2000 GD_{54} | — | April 5, 2000 | Socorro | LINEAR | fast | 3.7 km | MPC · JPL |
| 67291 | 2000 GN_{65} | — | April 5, 2000 | Socorro | LINEAR | THM | 6.9 km | MPC · JPL |
| 67292 | 2000 GR_{65} | — | April 5, 2000 | Socorro | LINEAR | EUN | 3.0 km | MPC · JPL |
| 67293 | 2000 GE_{66} | — | April 5, 2000 | Socorro | LINEAR | · | 5.8 km | MPC · JPL |
| 67294 | 2000 GB_{74} | — | April 5, 2000 | Socorro | LINEAR | · | 2.7 km | MPC · JPL |
| 67295 | 2000 GK_{77} | — | April 5, 2000 | Socorro | LINEAR | · | 1.2 km | MPC · JPL |
| 67296 | 2000 GA_{80} | — | April 13, 2000 | Socorro | LINEAR | EUN | 3.2 km | MPC · JPL |
| 67297 | 2000 GM_{89} | — | April 4, 2000 | Socorro | LINEAR | ERI | 4.4 km | MPC · JPL |
| 67298 | 2000 GD_{91} | — | April 4, 2000 | Socorro | LINEAR | EOS | 4.4 km | MPC · JPL |
| 67299 | 2000 GS_{95} | — | April 6, 2000 | Socorro | LINEAR | · | 2.9 km | MPC · JPL |
| 67300 | 2000 GA_{99} | — | April 7, 2000 | Socorro | LINEAR | V | 1.6 km | MPC · JPL |

== 67301–67400 ==
back to top

| Designation | | | Discovery | | | Properties | | Ref |
| Permanent | Provisional | Named after | Date | Site | Discoverer(s) | Category | Diam. | Ref |
|---|---|---|---|---|---|---|---|---|
| 67301 | 2000 GR_{114} | — | April 7, 2000 | Socorro | LINEAR | · | 1.9 km | MPC · JPL |
| 67302 | 2000 GU_{132} | — | April 8, 2000 | Socorro | LINEAR | H | 1.2 km | MPC · JPL |
| 67303 | 2000 GR_{141} | — | April 7, 2000 | Anderson Mesa | LONEOS | · | 3.6 km | MPC · JPL |
| 67304 | 2000 GZ_{157} | — | April 7, 2000 | Anderson Mesa | LONEOS | · | 11 km | MPC · JPL |
| 67305 | 2000 GD_{159} | — | April 7, 2000 | Socorro | LINEAR | · | 3.3 km | MPC · JPL |
| 67306 | 2000 GP_{163} | — | April 10, 2000 | Haleakala | NEAT | EOS | 4.6 km | MPC · JPL |
| 67307 | 2000 GA_{184} | — | April 5, 2000 | Socorro | LINEAR | · | 2.5 km | MPC · JPL |
| 67308 Öveges | 2000 HD | Öveges | April 21, 2000 | Piszkéstető | K. Sárneczky, L. Kiss | EOS | 7.4 km | MPC · JPL |
| 67309 | 2000 HO_{2} | — | April 25, 2000 | Kitt Peak | Spacewatch | · | 1.4 km | MPC · JPL |
| 67310 | 2000 HO_{9} | — | April 27, 2000 | Socorro | LINEAR | · | 2.9 km | MPC · JPL |
| 67311 | 2000 HF_{12} | — | April 28, 2000 | Socorro | LINEAR | · | 3.3 km | MPC · JPL |
| 67312 | 2000 HN_{15} | — | April 28, 2000 | Socorro | LINEAR | · | 4.8 km | MPC · JPL |
| 67313 | 2000 HG_{16} | — | April 29, 2000 | Socorro | LINEAR | · | 3.1 km | MPC · JPL |
| 67314 | 2000 HX_{23} | — | April 27, 2000 | Anderson Mesa | LONEOS | · | 2.5 km | MPC · JPL |
| 67315 | 2000 HR_{32} | — | April 29, 2000 | Socorro | LINEAR | · | 3.8 km | MPC · JPL |
| 67316 | 2000 HU_{37} | — | April 30, 2000 | Socorro | LINEAR | · | 5.7 km | MPC · JPL |
| 67317 | 2000 HE_{43} | — | April 29, 2000 | Socorro | LINEAR | · | 2.1 km | MPC · JPL |
| 67318 | 2000 HT_{50} | — | April 29, 2000 | Socorro | LINEAR | · | 2.7 km | MPC · JPL |
| 67319 | 2000 HC_{57} | — | April 24, 2000 | Anderson Mesa | LONEOS | · | 2.7 km | MPC · JPL |
| 67320 | 2000 HR_{60} | — | April 25, 2000 | Anderson Mesa | LONEOS | (2076) | 1.5 km | MPC · JPL |
| 67321 | 2000 HN_{61} | — | April 25, 2000 | Anderson Mesa | LONEOS | · | 1.7 km | MPC · JPL |
| 67322 | 2000 HN_{62} | — | April 25, 2000 | Kitt Peak | Spacewatch | · | 5.1 km | MPC · JPL |
| 67323 | 2000 HX_{65} | — | April 26, 2000 | Anderson Mesa | LONEOS | · | 1.3 km | MPC · JPL |
| 67324 | 2000 HC_{69} | — | April 24, 2000 | Anderson Mesa | LONEOS | · | 5.4 km | MPC · JPL |
| 67325 | 2000 HU_{69} | — | April 26, 2000 | Anderson Mesa | LONEOS | · | 1.7 km | MPC · JPL |
| 67326 | 2000 HX_{73} | — | April 27, 2000 | Anderson Mesa | LONEOS | · | 2.5 km | MPC · JPL |
| 67327 | 2000 HD_{76} | — | April 27, 2000 | Socorro | LINEAR | · | 3.3 km | MPC · JPL |
| 67328 | 2000 HK_{77} | — | April 28, 2000 | Anderson Mesa | LONEOS | EUN | 2.7 km | MPC · JPL |
| 67329 | 2000 HV_{77} | — | April 28, 2000 | Anderson Mesa | LONEOS | MAR | 3.2 km | MPC · JPL |
| 67330 | 2000 HE_{79} | — | April 28, 2000 | Anderson Mesa | LONEOS | PHO | 2.1 km | MPC · JPL |
| 67331 | 2000 HN_{79} | — | April 28, 2000 | Socorro | LINEAR | · | 1.5 km | MPC · JPL |
| 67332 | 2000 HF_{81} | — | April 28, 2000 | Anderson Mesa | LONEOS | H | 1.9 km | MPC · JPL |
| 67333 | 2000 HG_{103} | — | April 27, 2000 | Anderson Mesa | LONEOS | · | 7.4 km | MPC · JPL |
| 67334 | 2000 JZ_{2} | — | May 3, 2000 | Socorro | LINEAR | · | 7.1 km | MPC · JPL |
| 67335 | 2000 JC_{6} | — | May 2, 2000 | Socorro | LINEAR | H | 1.5 km | MPC · JPL |
| 67336 | 2000 JG_{9} | — | May 3, 2000 | Socorro | LINEAR | · | 2.0 km | MPC · JPL |
| 67337 | 2000 JJ_{11} | — | May 3, 2000 | Socorro | LINEAR | GEF | 2.5 km | MPC · JPL |
| 67338 | 2000 JH_{12} | — | May 5, 2000 | Socorro | LINEAR | · | 3.0 km | MPC · JPL |
| 67339 | 2000 JL_{16} | — | May 5, 2000 | Socorro | LINEAR | · | 2.5 km | MPC · JPL |
| 67340 | 2000 JJ_{21} | — | May 6, 2000 | Socorro | LINEAR | HIL · 3:2 | 16 km | MPC · JPL |
| 67341 | 2000 JR_{21} | — | May 6, 2000 | Socorro | LINEAR | AGN | 3.0 km | MPC · JPL |
| 67342 | 2000 JA_{24} | — | May 7, 2000 | Socorro | LINEAR | · | 5.5 km | MPC · JPL |
| 67343 | 2000 JL_{24} | — | May 7, 2000 | Socorro | LINEAR | PHO | 3.9 km | MPC · JPL |
| 67344 | 2000 JD_{40} | — | May 7, 2000 | Socorro | LINEAR | · | 5.5 km | MPC · JPL |
| 67345 | 2000 JR_{48} | — | May 9, 2000 | Socorro | LINEAR | V | 1.7 km | MPC · JPL |
| 67346 | 2000 JB_{54} | — | May 6, 2000 | Socorro | LINEAR | · | 5.1 km | MPC · JPL |
| 67347 | 2000 JQ_{62} | — | May 9, 2000 | Socorro | LINEAR | · | 5.0 km | MPC · JPL |
| 67348 | 2000 JP_{65} | — | May 6, 2000 | Socorro | LINEAR | · | 5.1 km | MPC · JPL |
| 67349 | 2000 JF_{66} | — | May 6, 2000 | Socorro | LINEAR | GEF | 3.8 km | MPC · JPL |
| 67350 | 2000 JW_{66} | — | May 1, 2000 | Kitt Peak | Spacewatch | EOS | 4.4 km | MPC · JPL |
| 67351 | 2000 JQ_{79} | — | May 5, 2000 | Socorro | LINEAR | · | 2.8 km | MPC · JPL |
| 67352 | 2000 JN_{80} | — | May 2, 2000 | Kitt Peak | Spacewatch | · | 3.4 km | MPC · JPL |
| 67353 | 2000 JW_{82} | — | May 7, 2000 | Socorro | LINEAR | · | 3.2 km | MPC · JPL |
| 67354 | 2000 KM_{1} | — | May 26, 2000 | Socorro | LINEAR | PHO | 2.6 km | MPC · JPL |
| 67355 | 2000 KM_{4} | — | May 28, 2000 | Reedy Creek | J. Broughton | · | 2.3 km | MPC · JPL |
| 67356 | 2000 KD_{12} | — | May 28, 2000 | Socorro | LINEAR | EOS | 4.4 km | MPC · JPL |
| 67357 | 2000 KS_{15} | — | May 28, 2000 | Socorro | LINEAR | KOR | 3.0 km | MPC · JPL |
| 67358 | 2000 KU_{31} | — | May 28, 2000 | Socorro | LINEAR | THM | 8.2 km | MPC · JPL |
| 67359 | 2000 KU_{37} | — | May 24, 2000 | Kitt Peak | Spacewatch | · | 3.1 km | MPC · JPL |
| 67360 | 2000 KU_{40} | — | May 30, 2000 | Kitt Peak | Spacewatch | THM | 5.5 km | MPC · JPL |
| 67361 | 2000 KQ_{42} | — | May 31, 2000 | Kitt Peak | Spacewatch | · | 1.6 km | MPC · JPL |
| 67362 | 2000 KV_{70} | — | May 28, 2000 | Socorro | LINEAR | · | 4.3 km | MPC · JPL |
| 67363 | 2000 KG_{71} | — | May 28, 2000 | Socorro | LINEAR | · | 6.6 km | MPC · JPL |
| 67364 | 2000 KQ_{71} | — | May 28, 2000 | Socorro | LINEAR | · | 7.1 km | MPC · JPL |
| 67365 | 2000 LA_{23} | — | June 6, 2000 | Kitt Peak | Spacewatch | V | 1.3 km | MPC · JPL |
| 67366 | 2000 LV_{23} | — | June 8, 2000 | Socorro | LINEAR | H | 1.6 km | MPC · JPL |
| 67367 | 2000 LY_{27} | — | June 7, 2000 | Socorro | LINEAR | AMO +1km · PHA | 1.4 km | MPC · JPL |
| 67368 | 2000 LH_{33} | — | June 4, 2000 | Haleakala | NEAT | T_{j} (2.97) · HIL · 3:2 | 18 km | MPC · JPL |
| 67369 | 2000 MF_{2} | — | June 29, 2000 | Reedy Creek | J. Broughton | (5) | 3.3 km | MPC · JPL |
| 67370 | 2000 NX_{2} | — | July 3, 2000 | Socorro | LINEAR | · | 5.8 km | MPC · JPL |
| 67371 | 2000 NM_{5} | — | July 7, 2000 | Socorro | LINEAR | · | 2.6 km | MPC · JPL |
| 67372 | 2000 NU_{12} | — | July 5, 2000 | Anderson Mesa | LONEOS | PHO | 3.1 km | MPC · JPL |
| 67373 | 2000 NS_{13} | — | July 5, 2000 | Anderson Mesa | LONEOS | · | 3.4 km | MPC · JPL |
| 67374 | 2000 NE_{14} | — | July 5, 2000 | Anderson Mesa | LONEOS | NYS | 2.0 km | MPC · JPL |
| 67375 | 2000 NQ_{19} | — | July 5, 2000 | Anderson Mesa | LONEOS | · | 3.3 km | MPC · JPL |
| 67376 | 2000 NP_{28} | — | July 3, 2000 | Kitt Peak | Spacewatch | · | 2.9 km | MPC · JPL |
| 67377 | 2000 OW_{1} | — | July 26, 2000 | Farpoint | Farpoint | EOS · | 6.0 km | MPC · JPL |
| 67378 | 2000 OC_{3} | — | July 29, 2000 | Socorro | LINEAR | H | 3.2 km | MPC · JPL |
| 67379 | 2000 OB_{6} | — | July 24, 2000 | Socorro | LINEAR | · | 7.1 km | MPC · JPL |
| 67380 | 2000 OO_{6} | — | July 29, 2000 | Socorro | LINEAR | · | 2.1 km | MPC · JPL |
| 67381 | 2000 OL_{8} | — | July 30, 2000 | Socorro | LINEAR | APO · PHA | 360 m | MPC · JPL |
| 67382 | 2000 OO_{15} | — | July 23, 2000 | Socorro | LINEAR | · | 7.7 km | MPC · JPL |
| 67383 | 2000 OQ_{15} | — | July 23, 2000 | Socorro | LINEAR | · | 1.4 km | MPC · JPL |
| 67384 | 2000 OK_{17} | — | July 23, 2000 | Socorro | LINEAR | EOS | 5.1 km | MPC · JPL |
| 67385 | 2000 OU_{21} | — | July 30, 2000 | Socorro | LINEAR | PHO | 2.3 km | MPC · JPL |
| 67386 | 2000 OO_{43} | — | July 30, 2000 | Socorro | LINEAR | · | 1.7 km | MPC · JPL |
| 67387 | 2000 OS_{44} | — | July 30, 2000 | Socorro | LINEAR | · | 2.3 km | MPC · JPL |
| 67388 | 2000 OZ_{44} | — | July 30, 2000 | Socorro | LINEAR | PHO | 2.3 km | MPC · JPL |
| 67389 | 2000 OW_{45} | — | July 30, 2000 | Socorro | LINEAR | H | 1.5 km | MPC · JPL |
| 67390 | 2000 OU_{47} | — | July 31, 2000 | Socorro | LINEAR | · | 2.2 km | MPC · JPL |
| 67391 | 2000 OE_{48} | — | July 31, 2000 | Socorro | LINEAR | · | 2.1 km | MPC · JPL |
| 67392 | 2000 OW_{57} | — | July 29, 2000 | Anderson Mesa | LONEOS | · | 1.9 km | MPC · JPL |
| 67393 | 2000 OX_{58} | — | July 29, 2000 | Anderson Mesa | LONEOS | THM | 5.8 km | MPC · JPL |
| 67394 | 2000 OE_{61} | — | July 31, 2000 | Socorro | LINEAR | · | 1.9 km | MPC · JPL |
| 67395 | 2000 PR | — | August 1, 2000 | Socorro | LINEAR | fast? | 1.5 km | MPC · JPL |
| 67396 | 2000 PV_{2} | — | August 2, 2000 | Socorro | LINEAR | · | 1.5 km | MPC · JPL |
| 67397 | 2000 PR_{4} | — | August 3, 2000 | Bisei SG Center | BATTeRS | · | 3.6 km | MPC · JPL |
| 67398 | 2000 PA_{6} | — | August 5, 2000 | Haleakala | NEAT | · | 6.8 km | MPC · JPL |
| 67399 | 2000 PJ_{6} | — | August 3, 2000 | Socorro | LINEAR | APO | 740 m | MPC · JPL |
| 67400 | 2000 PW_{9} | — | August 1, 2000 | Socorro | LINEAR | V | 2.2 km | MPC · JPL |

== 67401–67500 ==
back to top

| Designation | | | Discovery | | | Properties | | Ref |
| Permanent | Provisional | Named after | Date | Site | Discoverer(s) | Category | Diam. | Ref |
|---|---|---|---|---|---|---|---|---|
| 67401 | 2000 PS_{21} | — | August 1, 2000 | Socorro | LINEAR | slow | 4.2 km | MPC · JPL |
| 67402 | 2000 PK_{24} | — | August 2, 2000 | Socorro | LINEAR | · | 1.3 km | MPC · JPL |
| 67403 | 2000 PB_{25} | — | August 3, 2000 | Socorro | LINEAR | · | 2.0 km | MPC · JPL |
| 67404 | 2000 PG_{26} | — | August 5, 2000 | Haleakala | NEAT | H | 1.7 km | MPC · JPL |
| 67405 | 2000 QC_{3} | — | August 24, 2000 | Socorro | LINEAR | · | 2.5 km | MPC · JPL |
| 67406 | 2000 QK_{3} | — | August 24, 2000 | Socorro | LINEAR | · | 1.6 km | MPC · JPL |
| 67407 | 2000 QG_{4} | — | August 24, 2000 | Socorro | LINEAR | PHO | 2.6 km | MPC · JPL |
| 67408 | 2000 QS_{4} | — | August 24, 2000 | Socorro | LINEAR | · | 2.0 km | MPC · JPL |
| 67409 | 2000 QC_{5} | — | August 24, 2000 | Socorro | LINEAR | · | 1.5 km | MPC · JPL |
| 67410 | 2000 QS_{19} | — | August 24, 2000 | Socorro | LINEAR | · | 1.6 km | MPC · JPL |
| 67411 | 2000 QJ_{26} | — | August 26, 2000 | Ondřejov | P. Kušnirák, P. Pravec | · | 1.5 km | MPC · JPL |
| 67412 | 2000 QF_{36} | — | August 24, 2000 | Socorro | LINEAR | · | 1.9 km | MPC · JPL |
| 67413 | 2000 QK_{50} | — | August 24, 2000 | Socorro | LINEAR | EMA | 8.1 km | MPC · JPL |
| 67414 | 2000 QQ_{60} | — | August 26, 2000 | Socorro | LINEAR | · | 4.2 km | MPC · JPL |
| 67415 | 2000 QY_{62} | — | August 28, 2000 | Socorro | LINEAR | · | 2.5 km | MPC · JPL |
| 67416 | 2000 QW_{64} | — | August 28, 2000 | Socorro | LINEAR | · | 2.3 km | MPC · JPL |
| 67417 | 2000 QF_{65} | — | August 28, 2000 | Socorro | LINEAR | V | 1.8 km | MPC · JPL |
| 67418 | 2000 QS_{68} | — | August 29, 2000 | Višnjan Observatory | K. Korlević | · | 2.1 km | MPC · JPL |
| 67419 | 2000 QE_{76} | — | August 24, 2000 | Socorro | LINEAR | V | 1.4 km | MPC · JPL |
| 67420 | 2000 QU_{76} | — | August 24, 2000 | Socorro | LINEAR | · | 1.6 km | MPC · JPL |
| 67421 | 2000 QX_{76} | — | August 24, 2000 | Socorro | LINEAR | · | 3.0 km | MPC · JPL |
| 67422 | 2000 QZ_{83} | — | August 24, 2000 | Socorro | LINEAR | · | 1.9 km | MPC · JPL |
| 67423 | 2000 QN_{88} | — | August 25, 2000 | Socorro | LINEAR | · | 2.0 km | MPC · JPL |
| 67424 | 2000 QF_{92} | — | August 25, 2000 | Socorro | LINEAR | · | 2.1 km | MPC · JPL |
| 67425 | 2000 QK_{92} | — | August 25, 2000 | Socorro | LINEAR | · | 1.9 km | MPC · JPL |
| 67426 | 2000 QA_{98} | — | August 28, 2000 | Socorro | LINEAR | · | 3.4 km | MPC · JPL |
| 67427 | 2000 QU_{100} | — | August 28, 2000 | Socorro | LINEAR | · | 1.7 km | MPC · JPL |
| 67428 | 2000 QA_{103} | — | August 28, 2000 | Socorro | LINEAR | · | 3.9 km | MPC · JPL |
| 67429 | 2000 QJ_{105} | — | August 28, 2000 | Socorro | LINEAR | · | 1.8 km | MPC · JPL |
| 67430 | 2000 QL_{105} | — | August 28, 2000 | Socorro | LINEAR | · | 1.8 km | MPC · JPL |
| 67431 | 2000 QS_{108} | — | August 29, 2000 | Socorro | LINEAR | NYS | 2.3 km | MPC · JPL |
| 67432 | 2000 QN_{112} | — | August 24, 2000 | Socorro | LINEAR | · | 2.0 km | MPC · JPL |
| 67433 | 2000 QZ_{112} | — | August 24, 2000 | Socorro | LINEAR | · | 2.2 km | MPC · JPL |
| 67434 | 2000 QZ_{119} | — | August 25, 2000 | Socorro | LINEAR | · | 1.5 km | MPC · JPL |
| 67435 | 2000 QH_{121} | — | August 25, 2000 | Socorro | LINEAR | · | 2.0 km | MPC · JPL |
| 67436 | 2000 QP_{121} | — | August 25, 2000 | Socorro | LINEAR | · | 2.0 km | MPC · JPL |
| 67437 | 2000 QL_{122} | — | August 25, 2000 | Socorro | LINEAR | · | 4.6 km | MPC · JPL |
| 67438 | 2000 QU_{123} | — | August 25, 2000 | Socorro | LINEAR | HNS | 4.0 km | MPC · JPL |
| 67439 | 2000 QG_{126} | — | August 31, 2000 | Socorro | LINEAR | · | 2.2 km | MPC · JPL |
| 67440 | 2000 QD_{137} | — | August 29, 2000 | Socorro | LINEAR | · | 1.9 km | MPC · JPL |
| 67441 | 2000 QU_{139} | — | August 31, 2000 | Socorro | LINEAR | V | 1.8 km | MPC · JPL |
| 67442 | 2000 QF_{149} | — | August 24, 2000 | Socorro | LINEAR | · | 3.3 km | MPC · JPL |
| 67443 | 2000 QH_{149} | — | August 24, 2000 | Socorro | LINEAR | · | 1.6 km | MPC · JPL |
| 67444 | 2000 QM_{149} | — | August 24, 2000 | Socorro | LINEAR | · | 1.9 km | MPC · JPL |
| 67445 | 2000 QX_{149} | — | August 25, 2000 | Socorro | LINEAR | EOS | 3.5 km | MPC · JPL |
| 67446 | 2000 QF_{151} | — | August 25, 2000 | Socorro | LINEAR | · | 4.6 km | MPC · JPL |
| 67447 | 2000 QJ_{151} | — | August 25, 2000 | Socorro | LINEAR | · | 2.8 km | MPC · JPL |
| 67448 | 2000 QC_{156} | — | August 31, 2000 | Socorro | LINEAR | V | 1.6 km | MPC · JPL |
| 67449 | 2000 QQ_{166} | — | August 31, 2000 | Socorro | LINEAR | · | 2.6 km | MPC · JPL |
| 67450 | 2000 QN_{167} | — | August 31, 2000 | Socorro | LINEAR | · | 1.5 km | MPC · JPL |
| 67451 | 2000 QR_{168} | — | August 31, 2000 | Socorro | LINEAR | · | 7.5 km | MPC · JPL |
| 67452 | 2000 QG_{170} | — | August 31, 2000 | Socorro | LINEAR | · | 1.7 km | MPC · JPL |
| 67453 | 2000 QB_{172} | — | August 31, 2000 | Socorro | LINEAR | · | 5.7 km | MPC · JPL |
| 67454 | 2000 QU_{174} | — | August 31, 2000 | Socorro | LINEAR | · | 1.8 km | MPC · JPL |
| 67455 | 2000 QR_{176} | — | August 31, 2000 | Socorro | LINEAR | · | 1.7 km | MPC · JPL |
| 67456 | 2000 QT_{179} | — | August 31, 2000 | Socorro | LINEAR | V | 1.5 km | MPC · JPL |
| 67457 | 2000 QA_{181} | — | August 31, 2000 | Socorro | LINEAR | (1338) (FLO) | 2.1 km | MPC · JPL |
| 67458 | 2000 QB_{181} | — | August 31, 2000 | Socorro | LINEAR | · | 2.5 km | MPC · JPL |
| 67459 | 2000 QJ_{181} | — | August 31, 2000 | Socorro | LINEAR | · | 6.3 km | MPC · JPL |
| 67460 | 2000 QS_{181} | — | August 31, 2000 | Socorro | LINEAR | · | 3.1 km | MPC · JPL |
| 67461 | 2000 QY_{181} | — | August 31, 2000 | Socorro | LINEAR | V | 2.0 km | MPC · JPL |
| 67462 | 2000 QW_{186} | — | August 26, 2000 | Socorro | LINEAR | · | 3.1 km | MPC · JPL |
| 67463 | 2000 QM_{204} | — | August 31, 2000 | Socorro | LINEAR | KOR | 3.6 km | MPC · JPL |
| 67464 | 2000 QX_{208} | — | August 31, 2000 | Socorro | LINEAR | · | 3.4 km | MPC · JPL |
| 67465 | 2000 QL_{209} | — | August 31, 2000 | Socorro | LINEAR | · | 1.2 km | MPC · JPL |
| 67466 | 2000 QJ_{217} | — | August 31, 2000 | Socorro | LINEAR | · | 3.3 km | MPC · JPL |
| 67467 | 2000 QZ_{228} | — | August 31, 2000 | Socorro | LINEAR | · | 1.6 km | MPC · JPL |
| 67468 | 2000 QY_{229} | — | August 31, 2000 | Socorro | LINEAR | · | 5.3 km | MPC · JPL |
| 67469 | 2000 RX | — | September 1, 2000 | Socorro | LINEAR | · | 1.9 km | MPC · JPL |
| 67470 | 2000 RQ_{3} | — | September 1, 2000 | Socorro | LINEAR | · | 4.9 km | MPC · JPL |
| 67471 | 2000 RL_{4} | — | September 1, 2000 | Socorro | LINEAR | · | 4.1 km | MPC · JPL |
| 67472 | 2000 RD_{6} | — | September 1, 2000 | Socorro | LINEAR | · | 1.7 km | MPC · JPL |
| 67473 | 2000 RH_{6} | — | September 1, 2000 | Socorro | LINEAR | · | 1.2 km | MPC · JPL |
| 67474 | 2000 RL_{7} | — | September 1, 2000 | Socorro | LINEAR | · | 1.6 km | MPC · JPL |
| 67475 | 2000 RY_{7} | — | September 1, 2000 | Socorro | LINEAR | V | 2.1 km | MPC · JPL |
| 67476 | 2000 RM_{9} | — | September 1, 2000 | Socorro | LINEAR | · | 4.3 km | MPC · JPL |
| 67477 | 2000 RF_{10} | — | September 1, 2000 | Socorro | LINEAR | · | 1.6 km | MPC · JPL |
| 67478 | 2000 RR_{10} | — | September 1, 2000 | Socorro | LINEAR | · | 2.0 km | MPC · JPL |
| 67479 | 2000 RM_{11} | — | September 1, 2000 | Socorro | LINEAR | V | 1.9 km | MPC · JPL |
| 67480 | 2000 RP_{11} | — | September 1, 2000 | Socorro | LINEAR | V | 1.9 km | MPC · JPL |
| 67481 | 2000 RQ_{11} | — | September 1, 2000 | Socorro | LINEAR | V | 1.9 km | MPC · JPL |
| 67482 | 2000 RC_{13} | — | September 1, 2000 | Socorro | LINEAR | EOS | 3.6 km | MPC · JPL |
| 67483 | 2000 RC_{14} | — | September 1, 2000 | Socorro | LINEAR | V | 1.7 km | MPC · JPL |
| 67484 | 2000 RO_{14} | — | September 1, 2000 | Socorro | LINEAR | · | 5.8 km | MPC · JPL |
| 67485 | 2000 RU_{14} | — | September 1, 2000 | Socorro | LINEAR | CYB | 11 km | MPC · JPL |
| 67486 | 2000 RD_{18} | — | September 1, 2000 | Socorro | LINEAR | · | 1.9 km | MPC · JPL |
| 67487 | 2000 RQ_{19} | — | September 1, 2000 | Socorro | LINEAR | · | 2.1 km | MPC · JPL |
| 67488 | 2000 RM_{20} | — | September 1, 2000 | Socorro | LINEAR | · | 1.8 km | MPC · JPL |
| 67489 | 2000 RG_{22} | — | September 1, 2000 | Socorro | LINEAR | · | 3.2 km | MPC · JPL |
| 67490 | 2000 RN_{22} | — | September 1, 2000 | Socorro | LINEAR | · | 1.8 km | MPC · JPL |
| 67491 | 2000 RF_{23} | — | September 1, 2000 | Socorro | LINEAR | · | 1.3 km | MPC · JPL |
| 67492 | 2000 RT_{23} | — | September 1, 2000 | Socorro | LINEAR | · | 2.3 km | MPC · JPL |
| 67493 | 2000 RR_{27} | — | September 1, 2000 | Socorro | LINEAR | · | 3.8 km | MPC · JPL |
| 67494 | 2000 RL_{28} | — | September 1, 2000 | Socorro | LINEAR | · | 2.3 km | MPC · JPL |
| 67495 | 2000 RW_{29} | — | September 1, 2000 | Socorro | LINEAR | · | 2.0 km | MPC · JPL |
| 67496 | 2000 RK_{31} | — | September 1, 2000 | Socorro | LINEAR | · | 3.4 km | MPC · JPL |
| 67497 | 2000 RJ_{33} | — | September 1, 2000 | Socorro | LINEAR | · | 1.7 km | MPC · JPL |
| 67498 | 2000 RW_{39} | — | September 2, 2000 | Socorro | LINEAR | · | 4.5 km | MPC · JPL |
| 67499 | 2000 RV_{41} | — | September 3, 2000 | Socorro | LINEAR | V | 1.7 km | MPC · JPL |
| 67500 | 2000 RM_{43} | — | September 3, 2000 | Socorro | LINEAR | · | 1.4 km | MPC · JPL |

== 67501–67600 ==
back to top

| Designation | | | Discovery | | | Properties | | Ref |
| Permanent | Provisional | Named after | Date | Site | Discoverer(s) | Category | Diam. | Ref |
|---|---|---|---|---|---|---|---|---|
| 67501 | 2000 RU_{43} | — | September 3, 2000 | Socorro | LINEAR | · | 3.1 km | MPC · JPL |
| 67502 | 2000 RE_{44} | — | September 3, 2000 | Socorro | LINEAR | · | 3.1 km | MPC · JPL |
| 67503 | 2000 RW_{44} | — | September 3, 2000 | Socorro | LINEAR | · | 2.4 km | MPC · JPL |
| 67504 | 2000 RE_{45} | — | September 3, 2000 | Socorro | LINEAR | · | 1.2 km | MPC · JPL |
| 67505 | 2000 RK_{47} | — | September 3, 2000 | Socorro | LINEAR | · | 1.5 km | MPC · JPL |
| 67506 | 2000 RL_{47} | — | September 3, 2000 | Socorro | LINEAR | · | 2.5 km | MPC · JPL |
| 67507 | 2000 RS_{49} | — | September 5, 2000 | Socorro | LINEAR | · | 2.4 km | MPC · JPL |
| 67508 | 2000 RD_{50} | — | September 5, 2000 | Socorro | LINEAR | · | 3.8 km | MPC · JPL |
| 67509 | 2000 RU_{50} | — | September 5, 2000 | Socorro | LINEAR | · | 3.0 km | MPC · JPL |
| 67510 | 2000 RC_{53} | — | September 6, 2000 | Socorro | LINEAR | · | 1.9 km | MPC · JPL |
| 67511 | 2000 RR_{55} | — | September 4, 2000 | Socorro | LINEAR | · | 6.8 km | MPC · JPL |
| 67512 | 2000 RL_{56} | — | September 6, 2000 | Socorro | LINEAR | · | 7.6 km | MPC · JPL |
| 67513 | 2000 RA_{60} | — | September 5, 2000 | Višnjan Observatory | K. Korlević | · | 1.6 km | MPC · JPL |
| 67514 | 2000 RS_{60} | — | September 3, 2000 | Socorro | LINEAR | · | 4.3 km | MPC · JPL |
| 67515 | 2000 RN_{62} | — | September 1, 2000 | Socorro | LINEAR | · | 6.3 km | MPC · JPL |
| 67516 | 2000 RM_{65} | — | September 1, 2000 | Socorro | LINEAR | · | 1.1 km | MPC · JPL |
| 67517 | 2000 RQ_{65} | — | September 1, 2000 | Socorro | LINEAR | · | 2.5 km | MPC · JPL |
| 67518 | 2000 RS_{65} | — | September 1, 2000 | Socorro | LINEAR | · | 1.9 km | MPC · JPL |
| 67519 | 2000 RN_{66} | — | September 1, 2000 | Socorro | LINEAR | · | 4.8 km | MPC · JPL |
| 67520 | 2000 RU_{66} | — | September 1, 2000 | Socorro | LINEAR | · | 3.3 km | MPC · JPL |
| 67521 | 2000 RN_{71} | — | September 2, 2000 | Socorro | LINEAR | · | 2.5 km | MPC · JPL |
| 67522 | 2000 RB_{79} | — | September 9, 2000 | Anderson Mesa | LONEOS | · | 1.4 km | MPC · JPL |
| 67523 | 2000 RV_{79} | — | September 1, 2000 | Socorro | LINEAR | · | 3.4 km | MPC · JPL |
| 67524 | 2000 RC_{83} | — | September 1, 2000 | Socorro | LINEAR | · | 1.6 km | MPC · JPL |
| 67525 | 2000 RW_{83} | — | September 1, 2000 | Socorro | LINEAR | NYS | 2.1 km | MPC · JPL |
| 67526 | 2000 RJ_{84} | — | September 2, 2000 | Anderson Mesa | LONEOS | ERI | 3.5 km | MPC · JPL |
| 67527 | 2000 RR_{84} | — | September 2, 2000 | Anderson Mesa | LONEOS | KOR | 3.1 km | MPC · JPL |
| 67528 | 2000 RC_{87} | — | September 2, 2000 | Anderson Mesa | LONEOS | · | 1.5 km | MPC · JPL |
| 67529 | 2000 RQ_{90} | — | September 3, 2000 | Socorro | LINEAR | · | 2.0 km | MPC · JPL |
| 67530 | 2000 RS_{90} | — | September 3, 2000 | Socorro | LINEAR | · | 2.9 km | MPC · JPL |
| 67531 | 2000 RV_{92} | — | September 3, 2000 | Socorro | LINEAR | · | 3.1 km | MPC · JPL |
| 67532 | 2000 RZ_{94} | — | September 4, 2000 | Anderson Mesa | LONEOS | · | 1.2 km | MPC · JPL |
| 67533 | 2000 RD_{95} | — | September 4, 2000 | Anderson Mesa | LONEOS | V | 1.7 km | MPC · JPL |
| 67534 | 2000 RL_{95} | — | September 4, 2000 | Anderson Mesa | LONEOS | · | 1.4 km | MPC · JPL |
| 67535 | 2000 RY_{100} | — | September 5, 2000 | Anderson Mesa | LONEOS | · | 2.4 km | MPC · JPL |
| 67536 | 2000 RX_{104} | — | September 6, 2000 | Socorro | LINEAR | EUN | 6.5 km | MPC · JPL |
| 67537 | 2000 SL_{1} | — | September 18, 2000 | Socorro | LINEAR | PHO | 2.6 km | MPC · JPL |
| 67538 | 2000 SC_{4} | — | September 21, 2000 | Haleakala | NEAT | · | 1.9 km | MPC · JPL |
| 67539 | 2000 SK_{4} | — | September 22, 2000 | Ametlla de Mar | J. Nomen | · | 1.3 km | MPC · JPL |
| 67540 | 2000 SX_{10} | — | September 24, 2000 | Prescott | P. G. Comba | V | 1.6 km | MPC · JPL |
| 67541 | 2000 SO_{17} | — | September 23, 2000 | Socorro | LINEAR | · | 1.6 km | MPC · JPL |
| 67542 | 2000 SR_{20} | — | September 22, 2000 | Anderson Mesa | LONEOS | · | 1.9 km | MPC · JPL |
| 67543 | 2000 SB_{32} | — | September 24, 2000 | Socorro | LINEAR | · | 1.7 km | MPC · JPL |
| 67544 | 2000 SQ_{34} | — | September 24, 2000 | Socorro | LINEAR | · | 1.9 km | MPC · JPL |
| 67545 | 2000 ST_{35} | — | September 24, 2000 | Socorro | LINEAR | · | 4.8 km | MPC · JPL |
| 67546 | 2000 SU_{38} | — | September 24, 2000 | Socorro | LINEAR | · | 1.4 km | MPC · JPL |
| 67547 | 2000 SE_{43} | — | September 26, 2000 | Črni Vrh | Mikuž, H. | · | 3.1 km | MPC · JPL |
| 67548 | 2000 SL_{47} | — | September 23, 2000 | Socorro | LINEAR | L5 | 18 km | MPC · JPL |
| 67549 | 2000 SL_{51} | — | September 23, 2000 | Socorro | LINEAR | · | 1.5 km | MPC · JPL |
| 67550 | 2000 SG_{56} | — | September 24, 2000 | Socorro | LINEAR | · | 1.2 km | MPC · JPL |
| 67551 | 2000 SF_{57} | — | September 24, 2000 | Socorro | LINEAR | BRA | 3.0 km | MPC · JPL |
| 67552 | 2000 SM_{63} | — | September 24, 2000 | Socorro | LINEAR | · | 1.2 km | MPC · JPL |
| 67553 | 2000 SU_{64} | — | September 24, 2000 | Socorro | LINEAR | · | 1.5 km | MPC · JPL |
| 67554 | 2000 ST_{67} | — | September 24, 2000 | Socorro | LINEAR | · | 4.1 km | MPC · JPL |
| 67555 | 2000 SG_{69} | — | September 24, 2000 | Socorro | LINEAR | · | 3.2 km | MPC · JPL |
| 67556 | 2000 SO_{79} | — | September 24, 2000 | Socorro | LINEAR | · | 6.1 km | MPC · JPL |
| 67557 | 2000 SP_{82} | — | September 24, 2000 | Socorro | LINEAR | · | 2.4 km | MPC · JPL |
| 67558 | 2000 SP_{83} | — | September 24, 2000 | Socorro | LINEAR | · | 1.3 km | MPC · JPL |
| 67559 | 2000 SV_{84} | — | September 24, 2000 | Socorro | LINEAR | · | 1.3 km | MPC · JPL |
| 67560 | 2000 SC_{85} | — | September 24, 2000 | Socorro | LINEAR | · | 2.2 km | MPC · JPL |
| 67561 | 2000 SE_{85} | — | September 24, 2000 | Socorro | LINEAR | · | 2.4 km | MPC · JPL |
| 67562 | 2000 SY_{86} | — | September 24, 2000 | Socorro | LINEAR | · | 1.6 km | MPC · JPL |
| 67563 | 2000 SM_{87} | — | September 24, 2000 | Socorro | LINEAR | · | 2.3 km | MPC · JPL |
| 67564 | 2000 SS_{87} | — | September 24, 2000 | Socorro | LINEAR | · | 1.9 km | MPC · JPL |
| 67565 | 2000 SN_{88} | — | September 24, 2000 | Socorro | LINEAR | · | 2.7 km | MPC · JPL |
| 67566 | 2000 SQ_{94} | — | September 23, 2000 | Socorro | LINEAR | · | 2.3 km | MPC · JPL |
| 67567 | 2000 SV_{98} | — | September 23, 2000 | Socorro | LINEAR | · | 1.7 km | MPC · JPL |
| 67568 | 2000 SL_{99} | — | September 23, 2000 | Socorro | LINEAR | · | 1.7 km | MPC · JPL |
| 67569 | 2000 SN_{101} | — | September 24, 2000 | Socorro | LINEAR | · | 2.9 km | MPC · JPL |
| 67570 | 2000 SB_{102} | — | September 24, 2000 | Socorro | LINEAR | · | 2.1 km | MPC · JPL |
| 67571 | 2000 SG_{102} | — | September 24, 2000 | Socorro | LINEAR | · | 1.1 km | MPC · JPL |
| 67572 | 2000 SU_{106} | — | September 24, 2000 | Socorro | LINEAR | · | 1.4 km | MPC · JPL |
| 67573 | 2000 SB_{111} | — | September 24, 2000 | Socorro | LINEAR | · | 1.4 km | MPC · JPL |
| 67574 | 2000 SL_{111} | — | September 24, 2000 | Socorro | LINEAR | · | 3.3 km | MPC · JPL |
| 67575 | 2000 SY_{111} | — | September 24, 2000 | Socorro | LINEAR | · | 8.3 km | MPC · JPL |
| 67576 | 2000 SA_{112} | — | September 24, 2000 | Socorro | LINEAR | · | 1.3 km | MPC · JPL |
| 67577 | 2000 SB_{112} | — | September 24, 2000 | Socorro | LINEAR | · | 1.5 km | MPC · JPL |
| 67578 | 2000 SO_{112} | — | September 24, 2000 | Socorro | LINEAR | slow | 1.9 km | MPC · JPL |
| 67579 | 2000 SZ_{112} | — | September 24, 2000 | Socorro | LINEAR | · | 1.5 km | MPC · JPL |
| 67580 | 2000 SN_{117} | — | September 24, 2000 | Socorro | LINEAR | · | 1.6 km | MPC · JPL |
| 67581 | 2000 SB_{119} | — | September 24, 2000 | Socorro | LINEAR | · | 1.5 km | MPC · JPL |
| 67582 | 2000 SN_{119} | — | September 24, 2000 | Socorro | LINEAR | · | 2.7 km | MPC · JPL |
| 67583 | 2000 SZ_{120} | — | September 24, 2000 | Socorro | LINEAR | · | 3.1 km | MPC · JPL |
| 67584 | 2000 SB_{123} | — | September 24, 2000 | Socorro | LINEAR | · | 1.9 km | MPC · JPL |
| 67585 | 2000 SP_{124} | — | September 24, 2000 | Socorro | LINEAR | · | 1.1 km | MPC · JPL |
| 67586 | 2000 SH_{125} | — | September 24, 2000 | Socorro | LINEAR | SUL | 5.9 km | MPC · JPL |
| 67587 | 2000 SK_{125} | — | September 24, 2000 | Socorro | LINEAR | · | 1.8 km | MPC · JPL |
| 67588 | 2000 SS_{127} | — | September 24, 2000 | Socorro | LINEAR | · | 2.5 km | MPC · JPL |
| 67589 | 2000 SL_{131} | — | September 22, 2000 | Socorro | LINEAR | · | 5.6 km | MPC · JPL |
| 67590 | 2000 SU_{135} | — | September 23, 2000 | Socorro | LINEAR | V | 1.7 km | MPC · JPL |
| 67591 | 2000 SM_{136} | — | September 23, 2000 | Socorro | LINEAR | · | 2.3 km | MPC · JPL |
| 67592 | 2000 SD_{138} | — | September 23, 2000 | Socorro | LINEAR | · | 1.3 km | MPC · JPL |
| 67593 | 2000 SK_{138} | — | September 23, 2000 | Socorro | LINEAR | · | 3.2 km | MPC · JPL |
| 67594 | 2000 SC_{139} | — | September 23, 2000 | Socorro | LINEAR | V | 2.3 km | MPC · JPL |
| 67595 | 2000 SQ_{139} | — | September 23, 2000 | Socorro | LINEAR | · | 1.4 km | MPC · JPL |
| 67596 | 2000 SV_{139} | — | September 23, 2000 | Socorro | LINEAR | · | 2.3 km | MPC · JPL |
| 67597 | 2000 SA_{141} | — | September 23, 2000 | Socorro | LINEAR | · | 2.0 km | MPC · JPL |
| 67598 | 2000 SG_{141} | — | September 23, 2000 | Socorro | LINEAR | · | 1.8 km | MPC · JPL |
| 67599 | 2000 SA_{145} | — | September 24, 2000 | Socorro | LINEAR | · | 1.6 km | MPC · JPL |
| 67600 | 2000 ST_{146} | — | September 24, 2000 | Socorro | LINEAR | (2076) | 2.3 km | MPC · JPL |

== 67601–67700 ==
back to top

| Designation | | | Discovery | | | Properties | | Ref |
| Permanent | Provisional | Named after | Date | Site | Discoverer(s) | Category | Diam. | Ref |
|---|---|---|---|---|---|---|---|---|
| 67601 | 2000 SQ_{147} | — | September 24, 2000 | Socorro | LINEAR | · | 1.2 km | MPC · JPL |
| 67602 | 2000 SR_{147} | — | September 24, 2000 | Socorro | LINEAR | · | 3.0 km | MPC · JPL |
| 67603 | 2000 SR_{148} | — | September 24, 2000 | Socorro | LINEAR | · | 1.5 km | MPC · JPL |
| 67604 | 2000 SV_{148} | — | September 24, 2000 | Socorro | LINEAR | · | 2.1 km | MPC · JPL |
| 67605 | 2000 SE_{149} | — | September 24, 2000 | Socorro | LINEAR | · | 3.9 km | MPC · JPL |
| 67606 | 2000 SY_{150} | — | September 24, 2000 | Socorro | LINEAR | (17392) | 2.8 km | MPC · JPL |
| 67607 | 2000 SO_{151} | — | September 24, 2000 | Socorro | LINEAR | · | 1.8 km | MPC · JPL |
| 67608 | 2000 SR_{154} | — | September 24, 2000 | Socorro | LINEAR | · | 3.0 km | MPC · JPL |
| 67609 | 2000 SK_{156} | — | September 24, 2000 | Socorro | LINEAR | · | 5.8 km | MPC · JPL |
| 67610 | 2000 SM_{160} | — | September 27, 2000 | Socorro | LINEAR | · | 3.3 km | MPC · JPL |
| 67611 | 2000 SW_{160} | — | September 27, 2000 | Socorro | LINEAR | · | 3.7 km | MPC · JPL |
| 67612 | 2000 SA_{161} | — | September 27, 2000 | Socorro | LINEAR | · | 2.5 km | MPC · JPL |
| 67613 | 2000 SL_{162} | — | September 21, 2000 | Haleakala | NEAT | · | 1.4 km | MPC · JPL |
| 67614 | 2000 SU_{162} | — | September 30, 2000 | Elmira | Cecce, A. J. | · | 1.6 km | MPC · JPL |
| 67615 | 2000 SU_{166} | — | September 23, 2000 | Socorro | LINEAR | · | 2.8 km | MPC · JPL |
| 67616 | 2000 SH_{168} | — | September 23, 2000 | Socorro | LINEAR | V | 2.2 km | MPC · JPL |
| 67617 | 2000 ST_{168} | — | September 23, 2000 | Socorro | LINEAR | · | 2.4 km | MPC · JPL |
| 67618 | 2000 SR_{169} | — | September 24, 2000 | Socorro | LINEAR | NYS | 3.3 km | MPC · JPL |
| 67619 | 2000 SJ_{171} | — | September 24, 2000 | Socorro | LINEAR | · | 6.4 km | MPC · JPL |
| 67620 | 2000 SW_{175} | — | September 28, 2000 | Socorro | LINEAR | · | 2.9 km | MPC · JPL |
| 67621 | 2000 SY_{175} | — | September 28, 2000 | Socorro | LINEAR | · | 1.8 km | MPC · JPL |
| 67622 | 2000 SJ_{176} | — | September 28, 2000 | Socorro | LINEAR | · | 2.0 km | MPC · JPL |
| 67623 | 2000 SK_{176} | — | September 28, 2000 | Socorro | LINEAR | · | 1.8 km | MPC · JPL |
| 67624 | 2000 SM_{177} | — | September 28, 2000 | Socorro | LINEAR | · | 3.0 km | MPC · JPL |
| 67625 | 2000 SA_{179} | — | September 28, 2000 | Socorro | LINEAR | · | 2.2 km | MPC · JPL |
| 67626 | 2000 SP_{180} | — | September 28, 2000 | Socorro | LINEAR | · | 6.0 km | MPC · JPL |
| 67627 | 2000 SW_{187} | — | September 21, 2000 | Haleakala | NEAT | · | 1.5 km | MPC · JPL |
| 67628 | 2000 ST_{188} | — | September 21, 2000 | Haleakala | NEAT | HNS | 3.9 km | MPC · JPL |
| 67629 | 2000 SK_{193} | — | September 24, 2000 | Socorro | LINEAR | · | 5.9 km | MPC · JPL |
| 67630 | 2000 SC_{200} | — | September 24, 2000 | Socorro | LINEAR | · | 2.3 km | MPC · JPL |
| 67631 | 2000 ST_{202} | — | September 24, 2000 | Socorro | LINEAR | · | 3.8 km | MPC · JPL |
| 67632 | 2000 SA_{206} | — | September 24, 2000 | Socorro | LINEAR | NYS | 2.0 km | MPC · JPL |
| 67633 | 2000 SA_{209} | — | September 25, 2000 | Socorro | LINEAR | · | 1.6 km | MPC · JPL |
| 67634 | 2000 SP_{210} | — | September 25, 2000 | Socorro | LINEAR | V | 1.5 km | MPC · JPL |
| 67635 | 2000 SE_{211} | — | September 25, 2000 | Socorro | LINEAR | · | 1.3 km | MPC · JPL |
| 67636 | 2000 SO_{211} | — | September 25, 2000 | Socorro | LINEAR | GEF | 3.8 km | MPC · JPL |
| 67637 | 2000 SQ_{211} | — | September 25, 2000 | Socorro | LINEAR | · | 2.0 km | MPC · JPL |
| 67638 | 2000 SH_{214} | — | September 26, 2000 | Socorro | LINEAR | NYS | 3.1 km | MPC · JPL |
| 67639 | 2000 SE_{216} | — | September 26, 2000 | Socorro | LINEAR | · | 1.8 km | MPC · JPL |
| 67640 | 2000 SW_{216} | — | September 26, 2000 | Socorro | LINEAR | · | 4.7 km | MPC · JPL |
| 67641 | 2000 SA_{217} | — | September 26, 2000 | Socorro | LINEAR | V | 1.6 km | MPC · JPL |
| 67642 | 2000 SJ_{217} | — | September 26, 2000 | Socorro | LINEAR | · | 1.4 km | MPC · JPL |
| 67643 | 2000 SK_{218} | — | September 26, 2000 | Socorro | LINEAR | · | 3.0 km | MPC · JPL |
| 67644 | 2000 SK_{220} | — | September 26, 2000 | Socorro | LINEAR | · | 1.9 km | MPC · JPL |
| 67645 | 2000 SZ_{221} | — | September 26, 2000 | Socorro | LINEAR | · | 2.8 km | MPC · JPL |
| 67646 | 2000 SD_{224} | — | September 27, 2000 | Socorro | LINEAR | · | 4.9 km | MPC · JPL |
| 67647 | 2000 SM_{225} | — | September 27, 2000 | Socorro | LINEAR | · | 2.3 km | MPC · JPL |
| 67648 | 2000 SD_{226} | — | September 27, 2000 | Socorro | LINEAR | · | 1.7 km | MPC · JPL |
| 67649 | 2000 SS_{227} | — | September 27, 2000 | Socorro | LINEAR | · | 3.8 km | MPC · JPL |
| 67650 | 2000 SM_{228} | — | September 28, 2000 | Socorro | LINEAR | · | 1.8 km | MPC · JPL |
| 67651 | 2000 SG_{231} | — | September 30, 2000 | Socorro | LINEAR | · | 3.7 km | MPC · JPL |
| 67652 | 2000 SX_{233} | — | September 21, 2000 | Socorro | LINEAR | · | 1.9 km | MPC · JPL |
| 67653 | 2000 SU_{235} | — | September 24, 2000 | Socorro | LINEAR | · | 1.2 km | MPC · JPL |
| 67654 | 2000 SK_{237} | — | September 24, 2000 | Socorro | LINEAR | · | 1.7 km | MPC · JPL |
| 67655 | 2000 SE_{239} | — | September 26, 2000 | Socorro | LINEAR | · | 2.5 km | MPC · JPL |
| 67656 | 2000 SX_{243} | — | September 24, 2000 | Socorro | LINEAR | · | 1.8 km | MPC · JPL |
| 67657 | 2000 SF_{255} | — | September 24, 2000 | Socorro | LINEAR | · | 4.4 km | MPC · JPL |
| 67658 | 2000 SQ_{258} | — | September 24, 2000 | Socorro | LINEAR | NYS | 1.8 km | MPC · JPL |
| 67659 | 2000 SA_{261} | — | September 24, 2000 | Socorro | LINEAR | · | 2.2 km | MPC · JPL |
| 67660 | 2000 SH_{261} | — | September 24, 2000 | Socorro | LINEAR | · | 4.6 km | MPC · JPL |
| 67661 | 2000 SL_{261} | — | September 24, 2000 | Socorro | LINEAR | · | 1.8 km | MPC · JPL |
| 67662 | 2000 SF_{268} | — | September 27, 2000 | Socorro | LINEAR | · | 3.2 km | MPC · JPL |
| 67663 | 2000 SG_{268} | — | September 27, 2000 | Socorro | LINEAR | V | 1.5 km | MPC · JPL |
| 67664 | 2000 SJ_{269} | — | September 27, 2000 | Socorro | LINEAR | · | 1.3 km | MPC · JPL |
| 67665 | 2000 SX_{271} | — | September 27, 2000 | Socorro | LINEAR | V | 2.8 km | MPC · JPL |
| 67666 | 2000 SZ_{272} | — | September 28, 2000 | Socorro | LINEAR | · | 2.6 km | MPC · JPL |
| 67667 | 2000 SK_{274} | — | September 28, 2000 | Socorro | LINEAR | · | 1.4 km | MPC · JPL |
| 67668 | 2000 SU_{274} | — | September 28, 2000 | Socorro | LINEAR | · | 1.5 km | MPC · JPL |
| 67669 | 2000 SC_{275} | — | September 28, 2000 | Socorro | LINEAR | · | 1.6 km | MPC · JPL |
| 67670 | 2000 SL_{275} | — | September 28, 2000 | Socorro | LINEAR | · | 1.7 km | MPC · JPL |
| 67671 | 2000 SS_{275} | — | September 28, 2000 | Socorro | LINEAR | V | 1.4 km | MPC · JPL |
| 67672 | 2000 SA_{277} | — | September 30, 2000 | Socorro | LINEAR | · | 1.6 km | MPC · JPL |
| 67673 | 2000 SD_{278} | — | September 30, 2000 | Socorro | LINEAR | · | 2.0 km | MPC · JPL |
| 67674 | 2000 SH_{278} | — | September 30, 2000 | Socorro | LINEAR | · | 1.6 km | MPC · JPL |
| 67675 | 2000 SE_{280} | — | September 28, 2000 | Socorro | LINEAR | · | 7.2 km | MPC · JPL |
| 67676 | 2000 SP_{285} | — | September 23, 2000 | Socorro | LINEAR | · | 1.8 km | MPC · JPL |
| 67677 | 2000 SF_{286} | — | September 24, 2000 | Socorro | LINEAR | · | 7.0 km | MPC · JPL |
| 67678 | 2000 SQ_{287} | — | September 26, 2000 | Socorro | LINEAR | · | 4.7 km | MPC · JPL |
| 67679 | 2000 SR_{289} | — | September 27, 2000 | Socorro | LINEAR | · | 2.3 km | MPC · JPL |
| 67680 | 2000 SU_{292} | — | September 27, 2000 | Socorro | LINEAR | PHO | 3.6 km | MPC · JPL |
| 67681 | 2000 SH_{293} | — | September 27, 2000 | Socorro | LINEAR | PHO | 4.4 km | MPC · JPL |
| 67682 | 2000 SQ_{295} | — | September 27, 2000 | Socorro | LINEAR | · | 1.9 km | MPC · JPL |
| 67683 | 2000 SW_{298} | — | September 28, 2000 | Socorro | LINEAR | · | 1.3 km | MPC · JPL |
| 67684 | 2000 SX_{298} | — | September 28, 2000 | Socorro | LINEAR | · | 1.5 km | MPC · JPL |
| 67685 | 2000 SK_{299} | — | September 28, 2000 | Socorro | LINEAR | V | 1.5 km | MPC · JPL |
| 67686 | 2000 SN_{300} | — | September 28, 2000 | Socorro | LINEAR | · | 2.3 km | MPC · JPL |
| 67687 | 2000 SO_{304} | — | September 30, 2000 | Socorro | LINEAR | · | 1.7 km | MPC · JPL |
| 67688 | 2000 SX_{304} | — | September 30, 2000 | Socorro | LINEAR | · | 2.0 km | MPC · JPL |
| 67689 | 2000 SN_{307} | — | September 30, 2000 | Socorro | LINEAR | NYS | 2.6 km | MPC · JPL |
| 67690 | 2000 SH_{309} | — | September 30, 2000 | Socorro | LINEAR | · | 1.9 km | MPC · JPL |
| 67691 | 2000 SS_{310} | — | September 26, 2000 | Socorro | LINEAR | HNS | 5.2 km | MPC · JPL |
| 67692 | 2000 SX_{320} | — | September 30, 2000 | Socorro | LINEAR | · | 2.0 km | MPC · JPL |
| 67693 | 2000 SW_{323} | — | September 28, 2000 | Kitt Peak | Spacewatch | NYS | 2.7 km | MPC · JPL |
| 67694 | 2000 SD_{333} | — | September 26, 2000 | Haleakala | NEAT | · | 5.8 km | MPC · JPL |
| 67695 | 2000 SH_{336} | — | September 26, 2000 | Haleakala | NEAT | · | 2.1 km | MPC · JPL |
| 67696 | 2000 SJ_{348} | — | September 20, 2000 | Socorro | LINEAR | · | 11 km | MPC · JPL |
| 67697 | 2000 SW_{352} | — | September 30, 2000 | Anderson Mesa | LONEOS | · | 5.0 km | MPC · JPL |
| 67698 | 2000 SW_{354} | — | September 29, 2000 | Anderson Mesa | LONEOS | · | 2.7 km | MPC · JPL |
| 67699 | 2000 ST_{369} | — | September 24, 2000 | Anderson Mesa | LONEOS | · | 1.6 km | MPC · JPL |
| 67700 | 2000 TZ_{9} | — | October 1, 2000 | Socorro | LINEAR | · | 2.0 km | MPC · JPL |

== 67701–67800 ==
back to top

| Designation | | | Discovery | | | Properties | | Ref |
| Permanent | Provisional | Named after | Date | Site | Discoverer(s) | Category | Diam. | Ref |
|---|---|---|---|---|---|---|---|---|
| 67701 | 2000 TP_{10} | — | October 1, 2000 | Socorro | LINEAR | · | 2.0 km | MPC · JPL |
| 67702 | 2000 TD_{14} | — | October 1, 2000 | Socorro | LINEAR | · | 6.0 km | MPC · JPL |
| 67703 | 2000 TU_{15} | — | October 1, 2000 | Socorro | LINEAR | MAS | 2.4 km | MPC · JPL |
| 67704 | 2000 TS_{21} | — | October 1, 2000 | Socorro | LINEAR | · | 1.4 km | MPC · JPL |
| 67705 | 2000 TY_{21} | — | October 2, 2000 | Socorro | LINEAR | · | 2.6 km | MPC · JPL |
| 67706 | 2000 TR_{26} | — | October 2, 2000 | Socorro | LINEAR | · | 4.3 km | MPC · JPL |
| 67707 | 2000 TD_{28} | — | October 3, 2000 | Socorro | LINEAR | · | 2.1 km | MPC · JPL |
| 67708 | 2000 TO_{34} | — | October 6, 2000 | Anderson Mesa | LONEOS | · | 1.6 km | MPC · JPL |
| 67709 | 2000 TE_{40} | — | October 1, 2000 | Socorro | LINEAR | ADE | 4.8 km | MPC · JPL |
| 67710 | 2000 TO_{67} | — | October 2, 2000 | Socorro | LINEAR | · | 1.5 km | MPC · JPL |
| 67711 Mitsuotoyokawa | 2000 UB | Mitsuotoyokawa | October 18, 2000 | Bisei SG Center | BATTeRS | V | 2.3 km | MPC · JPL |
| 67712 Kimotsuki | 2000 UG | Kimotsuki | October 21, 2000 | Bisei SG Center | BATTeRS | · | 1.9 km | MPC · JPL |
| 67713 | 2000 UF_{1} | — | October 22, 2000 | Ondřejov | L. Kotková | · | 2.3 km | MPC · JPL |
| 67714 | 2000 UC_{2} | — | October 22, 2000 | Višnjan Observatory | K. Korlević | · | 1.5 km | MPC · JPL |
| 67715 | 2000 UM_{3} | — | October 24, 2000 | Socorro | LINEAR | fast | 5.9 km | MPC · JPL |
| 67716 | 2000 UQ_{7} | — | October 24, 2000 | Socorro | LINEAR | NYS | 3.7 km | MPC · JPL |
| 67717 | 2000 UA_{8} | — | October 24, 2000 | Socorro | LINEAR | · | 2.5 km | MPC · JPL |
| 67718 | 2000 UQ_{9} | — | October 24, 2000 | Socorro | LINEAR | · | 1.3 km | MPC · JPL |
| 67719 | 2000 UY_{10} | — | October 25, 2000 | Socorro | LINEAR | · | 2.8 km | MPC · JPL |
| 67720 | 2000 UQ_{11} | — | October 26, 2000 | Bisei SG Center | BATTeRS | · | 2.8 km | MPC · JPL |
| 67721 | 2000 US_{14} | — | October 25, 2000 | Socorro | LINEAR | · | 1.4 km | MPC · JPL |
| 67722 | 2000 UE_{15} | — | October 25, 2000 | Socorro | LINEAR | (2076) | 2.3 km | MPC · JPL |
| 67723 | 2000 UQ_{15} | — | October 27, 2000 | Kitt Peak | Spacewatch | · | 1.2 km | MPC · JPL |
| 67724 | 2000 UP_{16} | — | October 29, 2000 | Fountain Hills | C. W. Juels | (2076) | 3.2 km | MPC · JPL |
| 67725 | 2000 UU_{16} | — | October 29, 2000 | Socorro | LINEAR | PHO | 3.9 km | MPC · JPL |
| 67726 | 2000 UP_{17} | — | October 24, 2000 | Socorro | LINEAR | · | 1.7 km | MPC · JPL |
| 67727 | 2000 UH_{23} | — | October 24, 2000 | Socorro | LINEAR | · | 3.9 km | MPC · JPL |
| 67728 | 2000 UN_{23} | — | October 24, 2000 | Socorro | LINEAR | · | 2.8 km | MPC · JPL |
| 67729 | 2000 UQ_{23} | — | October 24, 2000 | Socorro | LINEAR | · | 1.1 km | MPC · JPL |
| 67730 | 2000 UX_{23} | — | October 24, 2000 | Socorro | LINEAR | · | 2.6 km | MPC · JPL |
| 67731 | 2000 UJ_{25} | — | October 24, 2000 | Socorro | LINEAR | · | 1.3 km | MPC · JPL |
| 67732 | 2000 UA_{26} | — | October 24, 2000 | Socorro | LINEAR | slow | 2.1 km | MPC · JPL |
| 67733 | 2000 UC_{26} | — | October 24, 2000 | Socorro | LINEAR | · | 1.7 km | MPC · JPL |
| 67734 | 2000 UE_{26} | — | October 24, 2000 | Socorro | LINEAR | · | 3.7 km | MPC · JPL |
| 67735 | 2000 UH_{26} | — | October 24, 2000 | Socorro | LINEAR | · | 2.2 km | MPC · JPL |
| 67736 | 2000 UD_{28} | — | October 25, 2000 | Socorro | LINEAR | · | 1.6 km | MPC · JPL |
| 67737 | 2000 UN_{28} | — | October 25, 2000 | Socorro | LINEAR | V | 1.6 km | MPC · JPL |
| 67738 | 2000 UB_{29} | — | October 29, 2000 | Kitt Peak | Spacewatch | · | 1.4 km | MPC · JPL |
| 67739 | 2000 UV_{29} | — | October 25, 2000 | Socorro | LINEAR | · | 1.4 km | MPC · JPL |
| 67740 | 2000 UJ_{30} | — | October 29, 2000 | Kitt Peak | Spacewatch | · | 1.3 km | MPC · JPL |
| 67741 | 2000 UZ_{33} | — | October 30, 2000 | Desert Beaver | W. K. Y. Yeung | · | 1.8 km | MPC · JPL |
| 67742 | 2000 UP_{34} | — | October 24, 2000 | Socorro | LINEAR | · | 1.9 km | MPC · JPL |
| 67743 | 2000 UK_{35} | — | October 24, 2000 | Socorro | LINEAR | · | 4.3 km | MPC · JPL |
| 67744 | 2000 UE_{38} | — | October 24, 2000 | Socorro | LINEAR | · | 4.5 km | MPC · JPL |
| 67745 | 2000 UT_{39} | — | October 24, 2000 | Socorro | LINEAR | (5) | 2.6 km | MPC · JPL |
| 67746 | 2000 UG_{40} | — | October 24, 2000 | Socorro | LINEAR | · | 1.8 km | MPC · JPL |
| 67747 | 2000 UF_{43} | — | October 24, 2000 | Socorro | LINEAR | · | 2.3 km | MPC · JPL |
| 67748 | 2000 UJ_{45} | — | October 24, 2000 | Socorro | LINEAR | · | 1.5 km | MPC · JPL |
| 67749 | 2000 UZ_{46} | — | October 24, 2000 | Socorro | LINEAR | V | 2.0 km | MPC · JPL |
| 67750 | 2000 UN_{47} | — | October 24, 2000 | Socorro | LINEAR | · | 3.5 km | MPC · JPL |
| 67751 | 2000 UF_{48} | — | October 24, 2000 | Socorro | LINEAR | · | 4.9 km | MPC · JPL |
| 67752 | 2000 UK_{48} | — | October 24, 2000 | Socorro | LINEAR | · | 5.2 km | MPC · JPL |
| 67753 | 2000 UQ_{48} | — | October 24, 2000 | Socorro | LINEAR | · | 2.2 km | MPC · JPL |
| 67754 | 2000 UF_{49} | — | October 24, 2000 | Socorro | LINEAR | V | 1.7 km | MPC · JPL |
| 67755 | 2000 US_{49} | — | October 24, 2000 | Socorro | LINEAR | · | 2.6 km | MPC · JPL |
| 67756 | 2000 UP_{50} | — | October 24, 2000 | Socorro | LINEAR | V | 2.1 km | MPC · JPL |
| 67757 | 2000 UA_{52} | — | October 24, 2000 | Socorro | LINEAR | V | 1.1 km | MPC · JPL |
| 67758 | 2000 UF_{55} | — | October 24, 2000 | Socorro | LINEAR | · | 2.1 km | MPC · JPL |
| 67759 | 2000 UW_{55} | — | October 24, 2000 | Socorro | LINEAR | · | 1.7 km | MPC · JPL |
| 67760 | 2000 UY_{57} | — | October 25, 2000 | Socorro | LINEAR | · | 2.1 km | MPC · JPL |
| 67761 | 2000 UM_{60} | — | October 25, 2000 | Socorro | LINEAR | · | 2.2 km | MPC · JPL |
| 67762 | 2000 UA_{61} | — | October 25, 2000 | Socorro | LINEAR | · | 2.5 km | MPC · JPL |
| 67763 | 2000 UU_{61} | — | October 25, 2000 | Socorro | LINEAR | · | 3.0 km | MPC · JPL |
| 67764 | 2000 UH_{62} | — | October 25, 2000 | Socorro | LINEAR | · | 1.7 km | MPC · JPL |
| 67765 | 2000 UM_{62} | — | October 25, 2000 | Socorro | LINEAR | · | 2.4 km | MPC · JPL |
| 67766 | 2000 UH_{65} | — | October 25, 2000 | Socorro | LINEAR | · | 2.8 km | MPC · JPL |
| 67767 | 2000 UC_{66} | — | October 25, 2000 | Socorro | LINEAR | · | 3.8 km | MPC · JPL |
| 67768 | 2000 UY_{66} | — | October 25, 2000 | Socorro | LINEAR | · | 2.0 km | MPC · JPL |
| 67769 | 2000 UG_{67} | — | October 25, 2000 | Socorro | LINEAR | · | 2.7 km | MPC · JPL |
| 67770 | 2000 UD_{72} | — | October 25, 2000 | Socorro | LINEAR | · | 3.5 km | MPC · JPL |
| 67771 | 2000 UJ_{74} | — | October 29, 2000 | Socorro | LINEAR | · | 4.1 km | MPC · JPL |
| 67772 | 2000 UZ_{77} | — | October 24, 2000 | Socorro | LINEAR | V | 1.4 km | MPC · JPL |
| 67773 | 2000 UM_{79} | — | October 24, 2000 | Socorro | LINEAR | EUN | 3.8 km | MPC · JPL |
| 67774 | 2000 UO_{79} | — | October 24, 2000 | Socorro | LINEAR | · | 1.6 km | MPC · JPL |
| 67775 | 2000 US_{80} | — | October 24, 2000 | Socorro | LINEAR | · | 3.2 km | MPC · JPL |
| 67776 | 2000 UX_{80} | — | October 24, 2000 | Socorro | LINEAR | · | 3.1 km | MPC · JPL |
| 67777 | 2000 UH_{81} | — | October 24, 2000 | Socorro | LINEAR | · | 1.7 km | MPC · JPL |
| 67778 | 2000 UT_{81} | — | October 24, 2000 | Socorro | LINEAR | (2076) | 2.0 km | MPC · JPL |
| 67779 | 2000 UU_{81} | — | October 24, 2000 | Socorro | LINEAR | · | 11 km | MPC · JPL |
| 67780 | 2000 US_{84} | — | October 31, 2000 | Socorro | LINEAR | · | 2.0 km | MPC · JPL |
| 67781 | 2000 UC_{85} | — | October 31, 2000 | Socorro | LINEAR | MAS | 2.3 km | MPC · JPL |
| 67782 | 2000 UW_{85} | — | October 31, 2000 | Socorro | LINEAR | · | 2.0 km | MPC · JPL |
| 67783 | 2000 UJ_{89} | — | October 31, 2000 | Socorro | LINEAR | · | 1.1 km | MPC · JPL |
| 67784 | 2000 UV_{89} | — | October 31, 2000 | Socorro | LINEAR | V | 1.4 km | MPC · JPL |
| 67785 | 2000 UM_{91} | — | October 25, 2000 | Socorro | LINEAR | · | 4.6 km | MPC · JPL |
| 67786 | 2000 UX_{94} | — | October 25, 2000 | Socorro | LINEAR | · | 1.5 km | MPC · JPL |
| 67787 | 2000 UD_{95} | — | October 25, 2000 | Socorro | LINEAR | · | 1.7 km | MPC · JPL |
| 67788 | 2000 UR_{95} | — | October 25, 2000 | Socorro | LINEAR | V | 2.0 km | MPC · JPL |
| 67789 | 2000 UD_{97} | — | October 25, 2000 | Socorro | LINEAR | · | 2.2 km | MPC · JPL |
| 67790 | 2000 UG_{100} | — | October 25, 2000 | Socorro | LINEAR | · | 2.8 km | MPC · JPL |
| 67791 | 2000 UP_{100} | — | October 25, 2000 | Socorro | LINEAR | · | 2.7 km | MPC · JPL |
| 67792 | 2000 UD_{102} | — | October 25, 2000 | Socorro | LINEAR | · | 1.7 km | MPC · JPL |
| 67793 | 2000 UE_{102} | — | October 25, 2000 | Socorro | LINEAR | · | 1.7 km | MPC · JPL |
| 67794 | 2000 UZ_{103} | — | October 25, 2000 | Socorro | LINEAR | V | 3.2 km | MPC · JPL |
| 67795 | 2000 UC_{104} | — | October 25, 2000 | Socorro | LINEAR | EUN | 3.8 km | MPC · JPL |
| 67796 | 2000 UP_{104} | — | October 25, 2000 | Socorro | LINEAR | · | 5.0 km | MPC · JPL |
| 67797 | 2000 UT_{106} | — | October 30, 2000 | Socorro | LINEAR | · | 2.8 km | MPC · JPL |
| 67798 | 2000 UD_{109} | — | October 31, 2000 | Socorro | LINEAR | · | 2.5 km | MPC · JPL |
| 67799 | 2000 UT_{109} | — | October 31, 2000 | Socorro | LINEAR | EOS | 4.7 km | MPC · JPL |
| 67800 | 2000 UZ_{109} | — | October 31, 2000 | Socorro | LINEAR | ERI | 3.4 km | MPC · JPL |

== 67801–67900 ==
back to top

| Designation | | | Discovery | | | Properties | | Ref |
| Permanent | Provisional | Named after | Date | Site | Discoverer(s) | Category | Diam. | Ref |
|---|---|---|---|---|---|---|---|---|
| 67801 | 2000 UC_{110} | — | October 31, 2000 | Socorro | LINEAR | · | 3.7 km | MPC · JPL |
| 67802 | 2000 VB_{4} | — | November 1, 2000 | Socorro | LINEAR | · | 2.3 km | MPC · JPL |
| 67803 | 2000 VX_{7} | — | November 1, 2000 | Socorro | LINEAR | NYS | 3.3 km | MPC · JPL |
| 67804 | 2000 VE_{11} | — | November 1, 2000 | Socorro | LINEAR | · | 2.9 km | MPC · JPL |
| 67805 | 2000 VF_{15} | — | November 1, 2000 | Socorro | LINEAR | · | 1.7 km | MPC · JPL |
| 67806 | 2000 VZ_{15} | — | November 1, 2000 | Socorro | LINEAR | · | 2.9 km | MPC · JPL |
| 67807 | 2000 VE_{16} | — | November 1, 2000 | Socorro | LINEAR | · | 4.7 km | MPC · JPL |
| 67808 | 2000 VL_{16} | — | November 1, 2000 | Socorro | LINEAR | · | 1.2 km | MPC · JPL |
| 67809 | 2000 VS_{18} | — | November 1, 2000 | Socorro | LINEAR | EUN | 2.5 km | MPC · JPL |
| 67810 | 2000 VY_{22} | — | November 1, 2000 | Socorro | LINEAR | · | 3.8 km | MPC · JPL |
| 67811 | 2000 VL_{23} | — | November 1, 2000 | Socorro | LINEAR | KOR | 3.2 km | MPC · JPL |
| 67812 | 2000 VF_{24} | — | November 1, 2000 | Socorro | LINEAR | · | 1.7 km | MPC · JPL |
| 67813 | 2000 VN_{24} | — | November 1, 2000 | Socorro | LINEAR | · | 1.4 km | MPC · JPL |
| 67814 | 2000 VL_{26} | — | November 1, 2000 | Socorro | LINEAR | V | 1.5 km | MPC · JPL |
| 67815 | 2000 VB_{27} | — | November 1, 2000 | Socorro | LINEAR | · | 1.4 km | MPC · JPL |
| 67816 | 2000 VZ_{28} | — | November 1, 2000 | Socorro | LINEAR | · | 3.0 km | MPC · JPL |
| 67817 | 2000 VR_{30} | — | November 1, 2000 | Socorro | LINEAR | HYG | 10 km | MPC · JPL |
| 67818 | 2000 VJ_{32} | — | November 1, 2000 | Socorro | LINEAR | · | 4.9 km | MPC · JPL |
| 67819 | 2000 VP_{32} | — | November 1, 2000 | Socorro | LINEAR | · | 2.2 km | MPC · JPL |
| 67820 | 2000 VS_{32} | — | November 1, 2000 | Socorro | LINEAR | · | 1.7 km | MPC · JPL |
| 67821 | 2000 VT_{32} | — | November 1, 2000 | Socorro | LINEAR | · | 1.8 km | MPC · JPL |
| 67822 | 2000 VN_{33} | — | November 1, 2000 | Socorro | LINEAR | · | 2.8 km | MPC · JPL |
| 67823 | 2000 VU_{33} | — | November 1, 2000 | Socorro | LINEAR | · | 3.0 km | MPC · JPL |
| 67824 | 2000 VB_{39} | — | November 1, 2000 | Desert Beaver | W. K. Y. Yeung | · | 2.1 km | MPC · JPL |
| 67825 | 2000 VF_{43} | — | November 1, 2000 | Socorro | LINEAR | · | 1.8 km | MPC · JPL |
| 67826 | 2000 VN_{44} | — | November 2, 2000 | Socorro | LINEAR | · | 3.0 km | MPC · JPL |
| 67827 | 2000 VK_{46} | — | November 3, 2000 | Socorro | LINEAR | · | 2.1 km | MPC · JPL |
| 67828 | 2000 VX_{46} | — | November 3, 2000 | Socorro | LINEAR | · | 3.0 km | MPC · JPL |
| 67829 | 2000 VP_{49} | — | November 2, 2000 | Socorro | LINEAR | · | 2.0 km | MPC · JPL |
| 67830 | 2000 VF_{50} | — | November 2, 2000 | Socorro | LINEAR | · | 1.5 km | MPC · JPL |
| 67831 | 2000 VV_{50} | — | November 2, 2000 | Socorro | LINEAR | · | 5.0 km | MPC · JPL |
| 67832 | 2000 VZ_{50} | — | November 3, 2000 | Socorro | LINEAR | (2076) | 2.1 km | MPC · JPL |
| 67833 | 2000 VC_{53} | — | November 3, 2000 | Socorro | LINEAR | · | 2.1 km | MPC · JPL |
| 67834 | 2000 VV_{53} | — | November 3, 2000 | Socorro | LINEAR | EUP | 12 km | MPC · JPL |
| 67835 | 2000 VY_{53} | — | November 3, 2000 | Socorro | LINEAR | · | 4.5 km | MPC · JPL |
| 67836 | 2000 VP_{55} | — | November 3, 2000 | Socorro | LINEAR | · | 1.5 km | MPC · JPL |
| 67837 | 2000 VQ_{55} | — | November 3, 2000 | Socorro | LINEAR | · | 2.0 km | MPC · JPL |
| 67838 | 2000 VP_{56} | — | November 3, 2000 | Socorro | LINEAR | · | 2.0 km | MPC · JPL |
| 67839 | 2000 VS_{57} | — | November 3, 2000 | Socorro | LINEAR | · | 3.9 km | MPC · JPL |
| 67840 | 2000 VZ_{60} | — | November 2, 2000 | Socorro | LINEAR | · | 2.1 km | MPC · JPL |
| 67841 | 2000 VR_{61} | — | November 9, 2000 | Socorro | LINEAR | BAR | 3.6 km | MPC · JPL |
| 67842 | 2000 VY_{61} | — | November 9, 2000 | Socorro | LINEAR | PHO | 2.7 km | MPC · JPL |
| 67843 | 2000 WL | — | November 16, 2000 | Socorro | LINEAR | · | 2.4 km | MPC · JPL |
| 67844 | 2000 WQ_{4} | — | November 19, 2000 | Socorro | LINEAR | · | 1.7 km | MPC · JPL |
| 67845 | 2000 WM_{5} | — | November 19, 2000 | Socorro | LINEAR | · | 2.3 km | MPC · JPL |
| 67846 | 2000 WU_{5} | — | November 19, 2000 | Socorro | LINEAR | · | 1.8 km | MPC · JPL |
| 67847 | 2000 WX_{6} | — | November 19, 2000 | Socorro | LINEAR | · | 1.5 km | MPC · JPL |
| 67848 | 2000 WB_{7} | — | November 19, 2000 | Socorro | LINEAR | EUN | 3.5 km | MPC · JPL |
| 67849 | 2000 WH_{7} | — | November 20, 2000 | Socorro | LINEAR | · | 1.6 km | MPC · JPL |
| 67850 | 2000 WS_{7} | — | November 20, 2000 | Socorro | LINEAR | · | 3.9 km | MPC · JPL |
| 67851 | 2000 WN_{8} | — | November 20, 2000 | Socorro | LINEAR | · | 2.4 km | MPC · JPL |
| 67852 | 2000 WT_{8} | — | November 20, 2000 | Socorro | LINEAR | · | 2.5 km | MPC · JPL |
| 67853 Iwamura | 2000 WO_{9} | Iwamura | November 22, 2000 | Kuma Kogen | A. Nakamura | · | 2.5 km | MPC · JPL |
| 67854 | 2000 WF_{12} | — | November 24, 2000 | Kitt Peak | Spacewatch | · | 4.4 km | MPC · JPL |
| 67855 | 2000 WO_{13} | — | November 18, 2000 | Socorro | LINEAR | · | 4.2 km | MPC · JPL |
| 67856 | 2000 WL_{15} | — | November 20, 2000 | Socorro | LINEAR | · | 3.1 km | MPC · JPL |
| 67857 | 2000 WQ_{18} | — | November 21, 2000 | Socorro | LINEAR | GEF | 2.6 km | MPC · JPL |
| 67858 | 2000 WX_{20} | — | November 25, 2000 | Kitt Peak | Spacewatch | · | 2.3 km | MPC · JPL |
| 67859 | 2000 WZ_{21} | — | November 20, 2000 | Socorro | LINEAR | · | 2.2 km | MPC · JPL |
| 67860 | 2000 WP_{22} | — | November 20, 2000 | Socorro | LINEAR | · | 3.7 km | MPC · JPL |
| 67861 | 2000 WT_{22} | — | November 20, 2000 | Socorro | LINEAR | · | 1.7 km | MPC · JPL |
| 67862 | 2000 WU_{22} | — | November 20, 2000 | Socorro | LINEAR | V | 1.6 km | MPC · JPL |
| 67863 | 2000 WZ_{22} | — | November 20, 2000 | Socorro | LINEAR | V | 1.5 km | MPC · JPL |
| 67864 | 2000 WD_{23} | — | November 20, 2000 | Socorro | LINEAR | · | 2.8 km | MPC · JPL |
| 67865 | 2000 WG_{23} | — | November 20, 2000 | Socorro | LINEAR | · | 1.9 km | MPC · JPL |
| 67866 | 2000 WK_{23} | — | November 20, 2000 | Socorro | LINEAR | V | 2.2 km | MPC · JPL |
| 67867 | 2000 WL_{23} | — | November 20, 2000 | Socorro | LINEAR | · | 2.7 km | MPC · JPL |
| 67868 | 2000 WY_{30} | — | November 20, 2000 | Socorro | LINEAR | V | 1.3 km | MPC · JPL |
| 67869 | 2000 WP_{31} | — | November 20, 2000 | Socorro | LINEAR | slow | 2.8 km | MPC · JPL |
| 67870 | 2000 WG_{32} | — | November 20, 2000 | Socorro | LINEAR | V | 1.6 km | MPC · JPL |
| 67871 | 2000 WV_{33} | — | November 20, 2000 | Socorro | LINEAR | · | 2.2 km | MPC · JPL |
| 67872 | 2000 WH_{34} | — | November 20, 2000 | Socorro | LINEAR | · | 3.0 km | MPC · JPL |
| 67873 | 2000 WL_{34} | — | November 20, 2000 | Socorro | LINEAR | · | 2.6 km | MPC · JPL |
| 67874 | 2000 WA_{36} | — | November 20, 2000 | Socorro | LINEAR | V | 1.3 km | MPC · JPL |
| 67875 | 2000 WX_{36} | — | November 20, 2000 | Socorro | LINEAR | · | 4.6 km | MPC · JPL |
| 67876 | 2000 WH_{37} | — | November 20, 2000 | Socorro | LINEAR | · | 3.0 km | MPC · JPL |
| 67877 | 2000 WQ_{40} | — | November 20, 2000 | Socorro | LINEAR | · | 2.9 km | MPC · JPL |
| 67878 | 2000 WR_{40} | — | November 20, 2000 | Socorro | LINEAR | · | 3.4 km | MPC · JPL |
| 67879 | 2000 WJ_{43} | — | November 21, 2000 | Socorro | LINEAR | · | 1.8 km | MPC · JPL |
| 67880 | 2000 WJ_{47} | — | November 21, 2000 | Socorro | LINEAR | V | 1.3 km | MPC · JPL |
| 67881 | 2000 WO_{47} | — | November 21, 2000 | Socorro | LINEAR | V | 1.1 km | MPC · JPL |
| 67882 | 2000 WR_{47} | — | November 21, 2000 | Socorro | LINEAR | · | 2.6 km | MPC · JPL |
| 67883 | 2000 WA_{50} | — | November 25, 2000 | Socorro | LINEAR | · | 2.8 km | MPC · JPL |
| 67884 | 2000 WR_{50} | — | November 26, 2000 | Socorro | LINEAR | · | 2.6 km | MPC · JPL |
| 67885 | 2000 WB_{51} | — | November 28, 2000 | Višnjan Observatory | K. Korlević | · | 1.8 km | MPC · JPL |
| 67886 | 2000 WQ_{58} | — | November 21, 2000 | Socorro | LINEAR | PHO | 2.7 km | MPC · JPL |
| 67887 | 2000 WA_{59} | — | November 21, 2000 | Socorro | LINEAR | INA | 7.2 km | MPC · JPL |
| 67888 | 2000 WR_{59} | — | November 21, 2000 | Socorro | LINEAR | · | 2.8 km | MPC · JPL |
| 67889 | 2000 WT_{60} | — | November 21, 2000 | Socorro | LINEAR | · | 2.0 km | MPC · JPL |
| 67890 | 2000 WK_{61} | — | November 21, 2000 | Socorro | LINEAR | · | 3.8 km | MPC · JPL |
| 67891 | 2000 WR_{61} | — | November 21, 2000 | Socorro | LINEAR | ERI | 5.1 km | MPC · JPL |
| 67892 | 2000 WS_{61} | — | November 21, 2000 | Socorro | LINEAR | · | 3.0 km | MPC · JPL |
| 67893 | 2000 WY_{61} | — | November 21, 2000 | Socorro | LINEAR | · | 3.6 km | MPC · JPL |
| 67894 | 2000 WX_{69} | — | November 19, 2000 | Socorro | LINEAR | · | 2.3 km | MPC · JPL |
| 67895 | 2000 WY_{70} | — | November 19, 2000 | Socorro | LINEAR | · | 2.2 km | MPC · JPL |
| 67896 | 2000 WZ_{73} | — | November 20, 2000 | Socorro | LINEAR | · | 4.2 km | MPC · JPL |
| 67897 | 2000 WK_{75} | — | November 20, 2000 | Socorro | LINEAR | · | 2.1 km | MPC · JPL |
| 67898 | 2000 WV_{87} | — | November 20, 2000 | Socorro | LINEAR | · | 11 km | MPC · JPL |
| 67899 | 2000 WB_{88} | — | November 20, 2000 | Socorro | LINEAR | · | 4.0 km | MPC · JPL |
| 67900 | 2000 WG_{90} | — | November 21, 2000 | Socorro | LINEAR | · | 1.8 km | MPC · JPL |

== 67901–68000 ==
back to top

| Designation | | | Discovery | | | Properties | | Ref |
| Permanent | Provisional | Named after | Date | Site | Discoverer(s) | Category | Diam. | Ref |
|---|---|---|---|---|---|---|---|---|
| 67901 | 2000 WP_{90} | — | November 21, 2000 | Socorro | LINEAR | · | 1.5 km | MPC · JPL |
| 67902 | 2000 WY_{92} | — | November 21, 2000 | Socorro | LINEAR | V | 1.6 km | MPC · JPL |
| 67903 | 2000 WV_{94} | — | November 21, 2000 | Socorro | LINEAR | EOS | 5.7 km | MPC · JPL |
| 67904 | 2000 WJ_{96} | — | November 21, 2000 | Socorro | LINEAR | · | 3.3 km | MPC · JPL |
| 67905 | 2000 WN_{96} | — | November 21, 2000 | Socorro | LINEAR | · | 1.9 km | MPC · JPL |
| 67906 | 2000 WD_{97} | — | November 21, 2000 | Socorro | LINEAR | NYS | 3.2 km | MPC · JPL |
| 67907 | 2000 WL_{97} | — | November 21, 2000 | Socorro | LINEAR | MAS | 1.9 km | MPC · JPL |
| 67908 | 2000 WF_{98} | — | November 21, 2000 | Socorro | LINEAR | V | 2.4 km | MPC · JPL |
| 67909 | 2000 WJ_{98} | — | November 21, 2000 | Socorro | LINEAR | V | 2.8 km | MPC · JPL |
| 67910 | 2000 WC_{100} | — | November 21, 2000 | Socorro | LINEAR | · | 1.8 km | MPC · JPL |
| 67911 | 2000 WN_{100} | — | November 21, 2000 | Socorro | LINEAR | · | 2.4 km | MPC · JPL |
| 67912 | 2000 WA_{101} | — | November 21, 2000 | Socorro | LINEAR | EUN | 3.8 km | MPC · JPL |
| 67913 | 2000 WC_{103} | — | November 26, 2000 | Socorro | LINEAR | · | 1.5 km | MPC · JPL |
| 67914 | 2000 WJ_{104} | — | November 27, 2000 | Socorro | LINEAR | · | 4.7 km | MPC · JPL |
| 67915 | 2000 WG_{105} | — | November 26, 2000 | Kitt Peak | Spacewatch | MAS | 1.6 km | MPC · JPL |
| 67916 | 2000 WU_{105} | — | November 28, 2000 | Kitt Peak | Spacewatch | HYG | 6.4 km | MPC · JPL |
| 67917 | 2000 WU_{109} | — | November 20, 2000 | Socorro | LINEAR | · | 2.4 km | MPC · JPL |
| 67918 | 2000 WW_{109} | — | November 20, 2000 | Socorro | LINEAR | · | 5.4 km | MPC · JPL |
| 67919 | 2000 WW_{111} | — | November 20, 2000 | Socorro | LINEAR | · | 2.7 km | MPC · JPL |
| 67920 | 2000 WB_{113} | — | November 20, 2000 | Socorro | LINEAR | EUN | 3.8 km | MPC · JPL |
| 67921 | 2000 WG_{113} | — | November 20, 2000 | Socorro | LINEAR | EUN | 3.0 km | MPC · JPL |
| 67922 | 2000 WN_{113} | — | November 20, 2000 | Socorro | LINEAR | · | 2.1 km | MPC · JPL |
| 67923 | 2000 WR_{113} | — | November 20, 2000 | Socorro | LINEAR | V | 1.9 km | MPC · JPL |
| 67924 | 2000 WJ_{115} | — | November 20, 2000 | Socorro | LINEAR | · | 2.5 km | MPC · JPL |
| 67925 | 2000 WA_{116} | — | November 20, 2000 | Socorro | LINEAR | · | 2.4 km | MPC · JPL |
| 67926 | 2000 WN_{118} | — | November 20, 2000 | Socorro | LINEAR | V | 2.2 km | MPC · JPL |
| 67927 | 2000 WB_{120} | — | November 20, 2000 | Socorro | LINEAR | · | 2.1 km | MPC · JPL |
| 67928 | 2000 WH_{122} | — | November 29, 2000 | Socorro | LINEAR | · | 3.1 km | MPC · JPL |
| 67929 | 2000 WL_{122} | — | November 29, 2000 | Socorro | LINEAR | · | 2.3 km | MPC · JPL |
| 67930 | 2000 WP_{122} | — | November 29, 2000 | Socorro | LINEAR | · | 3.1 km | MPC · JPL |
| 67931 | 2000 WD_{123} | — | November 29, 2000 | Socorro | LINEAR | · | 2.1 km | MPC · JPL |
| 67932 | 2000 WX_{125} | — | November 30, 2000 | Socorro | LINEAR | · | 9.7 km | MPC · JPL |
| 67933 | 2000 WR_{127} | — | November 17, 2000 | Kitt Peak | Spacewatch | · | 3.3 km | MPC · JPL |
| 67934 | 2000 WY_{133} | — | November 19, 2000 | Socorro | LINEAR | EUN | 3.7 km | MPC · JPL |
| 67935 | 2000 WU_{134} | — | November 19, 2000 | Socorro | LINEAR | V | 1.9 km | MPC · JPL |
| 67936 | 2000 WP_{135} | — | November 19, 2000 | Socorro | LINEAR | · | 2.2 km | MPC · JPL |
| 67937 | 2000 WT_{137} | — | November 20, 2000 | Socorro | LINEAR | · | 2.4 km | MPC · JPL |
| 67938 | 2000 WV_{137} | — | November 20, 2000 | Socorro | LINEAR | NYS | 3.2 km | MPC · JPL |
| 67939 | 2000 WO_{142} | — | November 20, 2000 | Anderson Mesa | LONEOS | · | 2.5 km | MPC · JPL |
| 67940 | 2000 WT_{143} | — | November 20, 2000 | Socorro | LINEAR | · | 5.6 km | MPC · JPL |
| 67941 | 2000 WX_{143} | — | November 20, 2000 | Socorro | LINEAR | · | 2.0 km | MPC · JPL |
| 67942 | 2000 WX_{144} | — | November 21, 2000 | Socorro | LINEAR | · | 1.8 km | MPC · JPL |
| 67943 | 2000 WP_{151} | — | November 30, 2000 | Socorro | LINEAR | · | 2.2 km | MPC · JPL |
| 67944 | 2000 WB_{152} | — | November 30, 2000 | Haleakala | NEAT | PHO | 2.7 km | MPC · JPL |
| 67945 | 2000 WW_{152} | — | November 29, 2000 | Socorro | LINEAR | · | 1.8 km | MPC · JPL |
| 67946 | 2000 WH_{153} | — | November 29, 2000 | Socorro | LINEAR | · | 2.3 km | MPC · JPL |
| 67947 | 2000 WR_{153} | — | November 29, 2000 | Socorro | LINEAR | EUN | 2.5 km | MPC · JPL |
| 67948 | 2000 WV_{156} | — | November 30, 2000 | Socorro | LINEAR | · | 1.9 km | MPC · JPL |
| 67949 | 2000 WY_{159} | — | November 20, 2000 | Anderson Mesa | LONEOS | · | 1.4 km | MPC · JPL |
| 67950 | 2000 WX_{160} | — | November 20, 2000 | Anderson Mesa | LONEOS | · | 1.5 km | MPC · JPL |
| 67951 | 2000 WB_{161} | — | November 20, 2000 | Anderson Mesa | LONEOS | · | 1.5 km | MPC · JPL |
| 67952 | 2000 WH_{166} | — | November 24, 2000 | Anderson Mesa | LONEOS | · | 5.4 km | MPC · JPL |
| 67953 | 2000 WN_{166} | — | November 24, 2000 | Anderson Mesa | LONEOS | · | 1.4 km | MPC · JPL |
| 67954 | 2000 WW_{166} | — | November 24, 2000 | Anderson Mesa | LONEOS | · | 2.2 km | MPC · JPL |
| 67955 | 2000 WT_{167} | — | November 24, 2000 | Anderson Mesa | LONEOS | · | 2.6 km | MPC · JPL |
| 67956 | 2000 WW_{167} | — | November 24, 2000 | Anderson Mesa | LONEOS | · | 5.1 km | MPC · JPL |
| 67957 | 2000 WX_{168} | — | November 25, 2000 | Anderson Mesa | LONEOS | NYS | 3.7 km | MPC · JPL |
| 67958 | 2000 WK_{170} | — | November 24, 2000 | Anderson Mesa | LONEOS | · | 1.4 km | MPC · JPL |
| 67959 | 2000 WB_{171} | — | November 24, 2000 | Anderson Mesa | LONEOS | EUN | 3.5 km | MPC · JPL |
| 67960 | 2000 WB_{173} | — | November 25, 2000 | Anderson Mesa | LONEOS | MAS | 1.9 km | MPC · JPL |
| 67961 | 2000 WO_{173} | — | November 25, 2000 | Socorro | LINEAR | · | 3.5 km | MPC · JPL |
| 67962 | 2000 WG_{175} | — | November 26, 2000 | Socorro | LINEAR | EUN | 3.3 km | MPC · JPL |
| 67963 | 2000 WX_{176} | — | November 27, 2000 | Socorro | LINEAR | · | 1.4 km | MPC · JPL |
| 67964 | 2000 WJ_{178} | — | November 28, 2000 | Kitt Peak | Spacewatch | EUN | 3.2 km | MPC · JPL |
| 67965 | 2000 WX_{181} | — | November 25, 2000 | Socorro | LINEAR | · | 8.3 km | MPC · JPL |
| 67966 | 2000 WZ_{183} | — | November 30, 2000 | Anderson Mesa | LONEOS | · | 1.5 km | MPC · JPL |
| 67967 | 2000 WB_{188} | — | November 16, 2000 | Anderson Mesa | LONEOS | · | 1.6 km | MPC · JPL |
| 67968 | 2000 WN_{190} | — | November 18, 2000 | Anderson Mesa | LONEOS | · | 3.6 km | MPC · JPL |
| 67969 | 2000 WO_{191} | — | November 19, 2000 | Anderson Mesa | LONEOS | V | 2.5 km | MPC · JPL |
| 67970 | 2000 WW_{195} | — | November 22, 2000 | Haleakala | NEAT | V | 1.2 km | MPC · JPL |
| 67971 | 2000 XP_{1} | — | December 3, 2000 | Kitt Peak | Spacewatch | MAS | 1.9 km | MPC · JPL |
| 67972 | 2000 XC_{4} | — | December 1, 2000 | Socorro | LINEAR | · | 1.7 km | MPC · JPL |
| 67973 | 2000 XV_{5} | — | December 1, 2000 | Socorro | LINEAR | V | 1.4 km | MPC · JPL |
| 67974 | 2000 XP_{6} | — | December 1, 2000 | Socorro | LINEAR | · | 3.1 km | MPC · JPL |
| 67975 | 2000 XW_{6} | — | December 1, 2000 | Socorro | LINEAR | · | 3.0 km | MPC · JPL |
| 67976 | 2000 XA_{7} | — | December 1, 2000 | Socorro | LINEAR | · | 5.5 km | MPC · JPL |
| 67977 | 2000 XZ_{7} | — | December 1, 2000 | Socorro | LINEAR | · | 3.7 km | MPC · JPL |
| 67978 | 2000 XE_{10} | — | December 1, 2000 | Socorro | LINEAR | · | 4.0 km | MPC · JPL |
| 67979 Michelory | 2000 XS_{10} | Michelory | December 4, 2000 | Le Creusot | J.-C. Merlin | · | 7.6 km | MPC · JPL |
| 67980 | 2000 XU_{10} | — | December 4, 2000 | Bisei SG Center | BATTeRS | V | 2.3 km | MPC · JPL |
| 67981 | 2000 XM_{12} | — | December 4, 2000 | Socorro | LINEAR | · | 2.6 km | MPC · JPL |
| 67982 | 2000 XH_{16} | — | December 1, 2000 | Socorro | LINEAR | PHO | 2.7 km | MPC · JPL |
| 67983 | 2000 XY_{16} | — | December 1, 2000 | Socorro | LINEAR | · | 1.4 km | MPC · JPL |
| 67984 | 2000 XC_{17} | — | December 1, 2000 | Socorro | LINEAR | V | 1.8 km | MPC · JPL |
| 67985 | 2000 XD_{17} | — | December 1, 2000 | Socorro | LINEAR | · | 4.2 km | MPC · JPL |
| 67986 | 2000 XJ_{17} | — | December 1, 2000 | Socorro | LINEAR | · | 2.3 km | MPC · JPL |
| 67987 | 2000 XX_{18} | — | December 4, 2000 | Socorro | LINEAR | · | 2.7 km | MPC · JPL |
| 67988 | 2000 XM_{19} | — | December 4, 2000 | Socorro | LINEAR | · | 2.1 km | MPC · JPL |
| 67989 | 2000 XV_{20} | — | December 4, 2000 | Socorro | LINEAR | · | 4.0 km | MPC · JPL |
| 67990 | 2000 XA_{21} | — | December 4, 2000 | Socorro | LINEAR | · | 2.3 km | MPC · JPL |
| 67991 | 2000 XE_{21} | — | December 4, 2000 | Socorro | LINEAR | V | 1.5 km | MPC · JPL |
| 67992 | 2000 XU_{22} | — | December 4, 2000 | Socorro | LINEAR | MAR | 3.7 km | MPC · JPL |
| 67993 | 2000 XD_{24} | — | December 4, 2000 | Socorro | LINEAR | · | 2.7 km | MPC · JPL |
| 67994 | 2000 XX_{24} | — | December 4, 2000 | Socorro | LINEAR | ADE | 8.6 km | MPC · JPL |
| 67995 | 2000 XU_{25} | — | December 4, 2000 | Socorro | LINEAR | V | 1.7 km | MPC · JPL |
| 67996 | 2000 XX_{28} | — | December 4, 2000 | Socorro | LINEAR | · | 2.8 km | MPC · JPL |
| 67997 | 2000 XA_{29} | — | December 4, 2000 | Socorro | LINEAR | · | 11 km | MPC · JPL |
| 67998 | 2000 XQ_{31} | — | December 4, 2000 | Socorro | LINEAR | V | 1.5 km | MPC · JPL |
| 67999 | 2000 XC_{32} | — | December 4, 2000 | Socorro | LINEAR | · | 4.7 km | MPC · JPL |
| 68000 | 2000 XM_{32} | — | December 4, 2000 | Socorro | LINEAR | · | 2.3 km | MPC · JPL |

back to top

== See also ==
- Meanings of minor-planet names: 67001–68000
