= Meanings of minor-planet names: 67001–68000 =

As minor planet discoveries are confirmed, they are given a permanent number by the IAU's Minor Planet Center (MPC), and the discoverers can then submit names for them, following the IAU's naming conventions. The list below concerns those minor planets in the specified number-range that have received names, and explains the meanings of those names.

Official naming citations of newly named small Solar System bodies are approved and published in a bulletin by IAU's Working Group for Small Bodies Nomenclature (WGSBN). Before May 2021, citations were published in MPC's Minor Planet Circulars for many decades. Recent citations can also be found on the JPL Small-Body Database (SBDB). Until his death in 2016, German astronomer Lutz D. Schmadel compiled these citations into the Dictionary of Minor Planet Names (DMP) and regularly updated the collection.

Based on Paul Herget's The Names of the Minor Planets, Schmadel also researched the unclear origin of numerous asteroids, most of which had been named prior to World War II. This article incorporates text from this source, which is in the public domain: SBDB New namings may only be added to this list below after official publication as the preannouncement of names is condemned. The WGSBN publishes a comprehensive guideline for the naming rules of non-cometary small Solar System bodies.

== 67001–67100 ==
Named minor planet	Provisional	This minor planet was named for...	Ref · Catalog
67019 Hlohovec	1999 XF_{137}	Hlohovec is a town in southwestern Slovakia, known for its beautiful castle, large pharmaceutical factory, and its huge impact on Slovak public astronomical activities since 1954. This minor planet was named on the occasion of the 50th anniversary of the 1972 founding of Hlohovec's Regional Public Observatory and Planetarium.	IAU · 67019
67070 Rinaldi	2000 AZ_{2}	Alvaro Rinaldi (born 1926) has been a topographer at the Military Geographic Institute of Florence for 40 years. He is fond of astronomy and sundials. He erected the sundials at the Pistoia Mountains Astronomical Observatory at San Marcello.	JPL · 67070
67085 Oppenheimer	2000 AG_{42}	J. Robert Oppenheimer (1904–1967) was an American theoretical physicist and the scientific director of the Manhattan Project. From 1947 to 1966 he directed the Institute of Advanced Study at Princeton. also known as the "father of the atomic bomb"	JPL · 67085

== 67101–67200 ==
back to top

Named minor planet	Provisional	This minor planet was named for...	Ref · Catalog
There are no named minor planets in this number range

== 67201–67300 ==
back to top

Named minor planet	Provisional	This minor planet was named for...	Ref · Catalog
67235 Fairbank	2000 EJ_{15}	William M. Fairbank (1917–1989), an American physicist and professor emeritus at Stanford University, earned his Ph.D. from Yale in 1948. He taught at Amherst College and Duke University before joining the Stanford faculty in 1959. His research interests included superconductivity, gravity waves, individual quarks and monopoles.	JPL · 67235

== 67301–67400 ==
back to top

Named minor planet	Provisional	This minor planet was named for...	Ref · Catalog
67308 Öveges	2000 HD	József Öveges (1895–1979) was a Hungarian teacher of physics who made physics popular to millions of people through his radio and television programs in Hungary. His lectures were unforgettable.	JPL · 67308

== 67401–67500 ==
back to top

Named minor planet	Provisional	This minor planet was named for...	Ref · Catalog
There are no named minor planets in this number range

== 67501–67600 ==
back to top

Named minor planet	Provisional	This minor planet was named for...	Ref · Catalog
There are no named minor planets in this number range

== 67601–67700 ==
back to top

Named minor planet	Provisional	This minor planet was named for...	Ref · Catalog
There are no named minor planets in this number range

== 67701–67800 ==
back to top

Named minor planet	Provisional	This minor planet was named for...	Ref · Catalog
67711 Mitsuotoyokawa	2000 UB	Mitsuo Toyokawa (b. 1948), former director of Japan Spaceguard Association.	IAU · 67711
67712 Kimotsuki	2000 UG	Kimotsuki, a Japanese town, where JAXA's Uchinoura Space Center is located. Since 1962, approximately 400 rockets and 27 satellites, including Japan's first satellite "Ohsumi" and the asteroid probe "Hayabusa", have been launched from the center.	JPL · 67712

== 67801–67900 ==
back to top

Named minor planet	Provisional	This minor planet was named for...	Ref · Catalog
67853 Iwamura	2000 WO_{9}	Akinori Iwamura (born 1979), born in Ehime prefecture, was a baseball player for the Tokyo Yakult Swallows from 1998 to 2006. He got the Gold Gloves Award five times as the best defensive third baseman. Beginning in 2007, Iwamura will play in U.S. Major League baseball for the Tampa Bay Devil Rays.	JPL · 67853

== 67901–68000 ==
back to top

Named minor planet	Provisional	This minor planet was named for...	Ref · Catalog
67979 Michelory	2000 XS_{10}	Michel Ory (born 1966), a Swiss physicist and teacher in the Jura Mountains, founded the Observatoire Astronomique Jurassien (185), near Vicques. The discoverer of minor planets has discovered 30 minor planets, including a Hilda object between 2000 and 2003.	JPL · 67979

back to top

Preceded by 66,001–67,000	Meanings of minor-planet names List of minor planets: 67,001–68,000	Succeeded by 68,001–69,000
