= William S. Smith =

William S. Smith may refer to:

- William Stephens Smith (1755–1816), United States Representative from New York
- Sir William Sidney Smith (Royal Navy officer), British admiral
- William Saumarez Smith (1836–1909), Australian Anglican archbishop
- William Sooy Smith (1830–1916), American Civil War general
- William Sidney Smith (assemblyman), New York politician
- William S. Smith Jr. (born 1947), former president of the Association of Universities for Research in Astronomy (AURA)

== See also ==
- William Smith (disambiguation)
