= Tom Skilling =

American television meteorologist (born 1952)

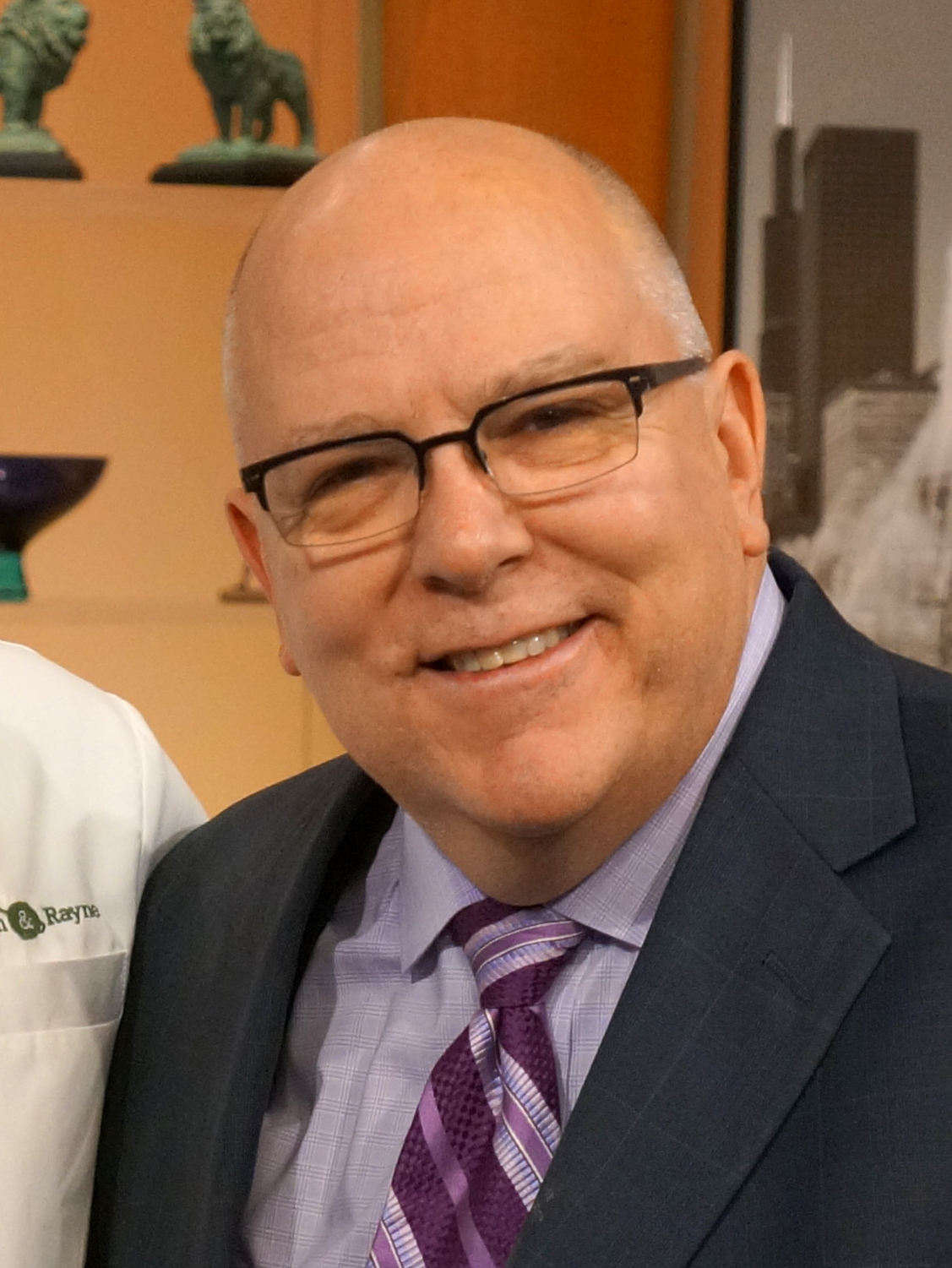
- Skilling in 2014
- Born: February 20, 1952 (age 74); Pittsburgh, Pennsylvania, U.S.
- Occupation: Meteorologist
- Years active: 1966–2024
- Notable credit(s): WGN-TV, WITI
- Family: Jeffrey Skilling (brother)

Thomas Ethelbert Skilling III (born February 20, 1952) is a former American television meteorologist. From 1978 to his retirement in 2024, he worked as a meteorologist at WGN-TV in Chicago.

== Career ==
=== Beginnings ===
The oldest of four children, Tom Skilling was born at Magee Hospital in Pittsburgh, Pennsylvania to Thomas Jr. and Betty (Clarke) Skilling. His early years were spent in Westfield, New Jersey. The family moved to the Chicago suburb of Aurora, Illinois, where he attended West Aurora High School. While in high school Skilling began his career in broadcasting at age 14, working for WKKD and WKKD-FM. Skilling observed that WKKD's forecasts were inaccurate because they were for Chicago and not Aurora, so he approached WKKD and offered to forecast the weather for several days, with the condition that if his forecasts were accurate he would be hired to host his own weather program. Skilling's forecasts were accurate, and he was hired to forecast Aurora's weather three times a day. At age 18, he began working at WLXT-TV in Aurora.

Skilling attended the University of Wisconsin in Madison to study meteorology and journalism. While attending the University of Wisconsin–Madison, he worked at WKOW-TV and WTSO radio, both in Madison. In 1975 Skilling took his first major-market television position, becoming the lead forecaster at WITI-TV in Milwaukee. At WITI, he delivered his forecasts with the "help" of the station's resident sock puppet mascot, Albert the Alley Cat.

=== WGN-TV ===
Skilling returned to the Chicago area and joined WGN-TV on August 13, 1978. He was WGN-TV's chief meteorologist and was rumored to be the highest-paid local broadcast meteorologist in the United States. He also had written the daily weather column for the Chicago Tribune. That feature, Ask Tom, ceased in August 2022 with a redesign of the weather page.

Skilling has long been hailed for his in-depth reports and striking accuracy, including correctly predicting the Groundhog Day blizzard in 2011 almost two weeks before it paralyzed the Chicago area.

Skilling played a role in the movie The Weather Man, which was set in Skilling's hometown of Chicago at a fictionalized version of WGN-TV. He also narrated the documentaries It Sounded Like a Freight Train and When Lightning Strikes for the station, about the science and dangers of tornadoes (the documentary also includes the Chicago area's history of tornadoes) and lightning.

Skilling announced on October 12, 2023 that he would be retiring from WGN-TV on February 28, 2024. On February 1, 2024, WGN announced that the WGN Weather Center will be renamed the Tom Skilling Weather Center.

=== AMS and Fermilab ===
Skilling is a member of the American Meteorological Society and National Weather Association. He hosted annual tornado and severe weather seminars at the Fermi National Accelerator Lab (Fermilab) in Batavia, Illinois. 2013 marked the 32nd year of the seminar and the first that featured presentations specifically on climate change. In 2018, he announced he would stop hosting these seminars because of scheduling conflicts.

== Awards and honors ==
In January 1995, Skilling received an Honorary Doctorate of Humanities from Lewis University in Romeoville, Illinois.

Asteroid 91888 Tomskilling, discovered by the Catalina Sky Survey in 1999, was named in his honor. The official naming citation was published by the Minor Planet Center on October 8, 2014 (M.P.C. 90379). A statement honoring his career was read into the Congressional record on November 1, 2023.

In 2024, Skilling was named Grand Marshall of the PrideFest in Woodstock, Illinois, but he had to step away from the role due to illness. Fellow WGN-TV newscaster Sean Lewis took his place.

== Personal life ==
Skilling is the older brother of Jeffrey Skilling, the former chief executive officer of Enron Corporation.
