= Aldo Di Clemente =

Italian astronomer (born 1948)

Asteroids discovered: 1
(26914) 1996 KC_{1}	20 May 1996	MPC^{[A]}
^{A} with A. Boattini

Aldo Di Clemente (born 1948) is an Italian amateur astronomer (active 1996–1997). He has worked as a technician at the Campo Imperatore station of the Osservatorio astronomico di Roma (Astronomical Observatory of Rome) since 1982. His assistance was valuable in conducting the Campo Imperatore Near-Earth Object Survey (CINEOS).

The main-belt asteroid 91214 Diclemente, discovered by astronomers Andrea Boattini and Luciano Tesi in 1998, was named in his honour. Naming citation was published on 15 December 2005 (M.P.C. 55724).
