= Meanings of minor-planet names: 91001–92000 =

As minor planet discoveries are confirmed, they are given a permanent number by the IAU's Minor Planet Center (MPC), and the discoverers can then submit names for them, following the IAU's naming conventions. The list below concerns those minor planets in the specified number-range that have received names, and explains the meanings of those names.

Official naming citations of newly named small Solar System bodies are approved and published in a bulletin by IAU's Working Group for Small Bodies Nomenclature (WGSBN). Before May 2021, citations were published in MPC's Minor Planet Circulars for many decades. Recent citations can also be found on the JPL Small-Body Database (SBDB). Until his death in 2016, German astronomer Lutz D. Schmadel compiled these citations into the Dictionary of Minor Planet Names (DMP) and regularly updated the collection.

Based on Paul Herget's The Names of the Minor Planets, Schmadel also researched the unclear origin of numerous asteroids, most of which had been named prior to World War II. This article incorporates text from this source, which is in the public domain: SBDB New namings may only be added to this list below after official publication as the preannouncement of names is condemned. The WGSBN publishes a comprehensive guideline for the naming rules of non-cometary small Solar System bodies.

== 91001–91100 ==
Named minor planet	Provisional	This minor planet was named for...	Ref · Catalog
91001 Shanghaishida	1998 BY_{8}	As a Key University founded in 1954, Shanghai Normal University (ShNU, Shanghaishida) is a high level comprehensive university in Shanghai with fields of liberal arts, natural sciences, engineering sciences, and fine arts, featuring strengths in teacher training. ShNU established its MS and PhD programs in Astronomy in 2004 and 2021, respectively.	IAU · 91001
91006 Fleming	1998 BT_{25}	Alexander Fleming (1881–1955) was a Scottish biologist and pharmacologist. His best-known achievements are the discovery of the enzyme lysozyme and isolation of the antibiotic substance penicillin, for which he shared a Nobel Prize in 1945 with Florey and Chain.	JPL · 91006
91007 Ianfleming	1998 BL_{30}	Ian Fleming (1908–1964) was a British writer and journalist. Fleming is best remembered for creating the character of British Secret Service agent James Bond ("007") and chronicling his adventures in twelve novels and nine short stories.	JPL · 91007
91023 Lutan	1998 DQ_{32}	Lu Tan (born 1932), a Chinese astrophysicist and academician of the Chinese Academy of Sciences, has made contributions in the fields of compact-star physics, cosmology and high-energy astrophysics, especially gamma-ray bursts and afterglow physics.	JPL · 91023
91024 Széchenyi	1998 DA_{33}	Count István Széchenyi (1791–1860), known as "The Greatest Hungarian", was a writer, reformer and patriot. In addition to promoting the first permanent bridge between Buda and Pest, he became famous for donating a year's income toward the foundation of the Hungarian Academy of Sciences.	JPL · 91024
91035 Hezehui	1998 EM_{21}	He Zehui (1914–2011), renowned physicist and academician of the Chinese Academy of Sciences.	JPL · 91035

== 91101–91200 ==
back to top

Named minor planet	Provisional	This minor planet was named for...	Ref · Catalog
91199 Johngray	1998 SS_{147}	John Gray (born 1948), is a British philosopher who considers morality to be an illusion and mankind a rapacious species engaged in wiping out other forms of life while destroying its natural environment.	JPL · 91199

== 91201–91300 ==
back to top

Named minor planet	Provisional	This minor planet was named for...	Ref · Catalog
91212 Virgiliogonano	1998 YQ_{7}	Virgilio Gonano (b. 1978), an Italian amateur astronomer and geologist.	IAU · 91212
91213 Botchan	1998 YZ_{7}	Botchan is one of the most popular novels in Japan, written by Soseki Natsume in 1906. The story is based on the author's personal experience as a Tokyo-born young teacher being transferred to the city of Matsuyama, which is the stage of the novel	JPL · 91213
91214 Diclemente	1998 YB_{10}	Aldo Di Clemente (born 1948), an Italian amateur astronomer, has worked as a technician at the Campo Imperatore station of the Astronomical Observatory of Rome since 1982. His assistance has been valuable in conducting the Campo Imperatore Near- Earth Object Survey. amateur astronomer, technician at the Campo Imperatore station of the Rome Observatory.	JPL · 91214
91275 Billsmith	1999 EW_{5}	William S. Smith Jr. (born 1947) was for 15 years president of the Association of Universities for Research in Astronomy (AURA), which operates NSO, NOAO, STScI, Gemini and LSST. Bill was a strong advocate for diversity in the astronomical community.	JPL · 91275
91287 Simon-Garfunkel	1999 FP_{21}	Simon & Garfunkel, American popular music duo of the 1960s. Paul Simon and Art Garfunkel were both born in 1941 and bred in Queens, New York. They became one of the most successful duos in the history of popular music. Their magic is heard through the beautiful high tenor voice of Garfunkel, as it gently wraps around Simon's natural talent of combining poetic lyrics with memorable melodies.	JPL · 91287

== 91301–91400 ==
back to top

Named minor planet	Provisional	This minor planet was named for...	Ref · Catalog
91333 Robertogorelli	1999 JP_{2}	Roberto Gorelli (b. 1954), an Italian amateur astronomer.	IAU · 91333
91335 Alexandrov	1999 JT_{9}	Svetoslav Alexandrov (b. 1986), a Bulgarian plant physiologist and amateur astronomer.	IAU · 91335
91389 Davidsaewert	1999 JN_{137}	David Saewert (b. 1959), an American software engineer and amateur astronomer.	IAU · 91389
91395 Sakanouenokumo	1999 LM_{1}	Saka no Ue no Kumo (Clouds Above the Hill) is a Japanese novel, written by Ryōtarō Shiba between 1968 and 1972. Based on the true story of three young men who lived in Matsuyama in the Meiji Period, this novel expresses the aspiration to western culture in Japan, which was en route to modernization.	JPL · 91395

== 91401–91500 ==
back to top

Named minor planet	Provisional	This minor planet was named for...	Ref · Catalog
91422 Giraudon	1999 OH	Edmond Giraudon (born 1924), a French professor in mechanical engineering and a popularizer of astronomy, initiated the construction of five observatories in several high schools in the Provence Alpes, Côte d´Azur and Languedoc Roussillon regions of France.	JPL · 91422
91428 Cortesi	1999 QT_{1}	Sergio Cortesi (born 1932), a Swiss astronomer who has been the director of the Istituto Ricerche Solari Locarno (Specola Solare Locarno-Monti, see IRSOL) since 1957. He was one of the co-founders and for a long time the president of the Ticino Astronomical Society (Src and Src).	JPL · 91428
91429 Michelebianda	1999 QO_{2}	Michele Bianda (born 1956) a Swiss physicist who studied at ETH Zurich and is now the scientific director of the Istituto Ricerche Solari in Locarno, IRSOL.	JPL · 91429

== 91501–91600 ==
back to top

Named minor planet	Provisional	This minor planet was named for...	Ref · Catalog
91553 Claudedoom	1999 RD_{214}	Claude Doom (born 1958) edited the Belgian astronomical magazine Heelal during 1994–1998 and is still a board member of the Flemish Amateur Astronomers Association. He wrote his Ph.D. thesis on the evolution of massive stars. The name was suggested by S. De Jonge, C. Steyaert and J. Meeus	JPL · 91553

== 91601–91700 ==
back to top

Named minor planet	Provisional	This minor planet was named for...	Ref · Catalog
91604 Clausmadsen	1999 TN_{19}	Claus Madsen (born 1951), a Dutch photographic scientist and senior counsellor for international relations at the European Southern Observatory, who has played a crucial role in increasing public awareness and interest in astronomy. He helped create the European Association for Astronomy Education and was key in having the U.N. pass the IYA resolution (Src).	JPL · 91604
91607 Delaboudinière	1999 TP_{20}	Jean-Pierre Delaboudinière (born 1940), a French astronomer, is a pioneer of the exploration of the solar UV resonance spectroscopy of Helium, and the Principal Investigator of the solar EUV imaging spectroscopy experiments on the CNES D2B and the ESA/NASA Solar and Heliospheric Observatory missions.	JPL · 91607

== 91701–91800 ==
back to top

Named minor planet	Provisional	This minor planet was named for...	Ref · Catalog
There are no named minor planets in this number range

== 91801–91900 ==
back to top

Named minor planet	Provisional	This minor planet was named for...	Ref · Catalog
91869 Ellenjozoff	1999 UU_{38}	Ellen “Jane” Jozoff (b. 1939), a community leader who is a board member on a number of nonprofit organizations in Arizona, USA.	IAU · 91869
91870 Malcolmjozoff	1999 UA_{39}	Malcolm Jozoff (b. 1942), a retired American corporate marketing executive.	IAU · 91870
91888 Tomskilling	1999 UA_{51}	Tom Skilling (born 1952) is an American meteorologist on WGN-TV in Chicago who is revered for the accuracy of his forecasts. He conducts annual free seminars at Fermilab on meteorology that are attended by several thousand people. He also includes much astronomical information in his weather reports.	JPL · 91888
91890 Kiriko Matsuri	1999 VD_{2}	Kiriko Matsuri, is the name of a number of festivals that take place on the Japanese Noto Peninsula. A kiriko is an object like a big lantern; the biggest one is 15 meters high and weighs 2 tons. Many people carry kirikos on their shoulders and run with them.	JPL · 91890
91898 Margnetti	1999 VB_{11}	Giuseppe Margnetti (born 1960) is a Swiss winemaker and artist living with his wife Danila (née Cosner) in the town of Camorino.	JPL · 91898

== 91901–92000 ==
back to top

Named minor planet	Provisional	This minor planet was named for...	Ref · Catalog
91907 Shiho	1999 VA_{26}	Shiho Ochi (born 1984), born in Ehime prefecture, is the vocalist of the band Superfly. Since their major debut in 2007 with "Hello Hello", her rich voice and the band's soulful rock-and-roll music have fascinated many fans in Japan, including the discoverer	JPL · 91907

back to top

Preceded by 90,001–91,000	Meanings of minor-planet names List of minor planets: 91,001–92,000	Succeeded by 92,001–93,000
