= List of minor planets: 91001–92000 =

The following is a partial list of minor planets, running from minor-planet number 91001 through 92000, inclusive. The primary data for this and other partial lists is based on JPL's "Small-Body Orbital Elements" and data available from the Minor Planet Center. Critical list information is also provided by the MPC, unless otherwise specified from Lowell Observatory. A detailed description of the table's columns and additional sources are given on the main page including a complete list of every page in this series, and a statistical break-up on the dynamical classification of minor planets.

Also see the summary list of all named bodies in numerical and alphabetical order, and the corresponding naming citations for the number range of this particular list. New namings may only be added to this list after official publication, as the preannouncement of names is condemned by the Working Group for Small Bodies Nomenclature of the International Astronomical Union.

Near-Earth obj.	MBA (inner)	MBA (outer)	Centaur
Mars-crosser	MBA (middle)	Jupiter trojan	Trans-Neptunian obj.
Unclassified

== 91001–91100 ==
Designation			Discovery			Properties		Ref
Permanent	Provisional	Named after	Date	Site	Discoverer(s)	Category	Diam.	Ref
91001 Shanghaishida	1998 BY_{8}	Shanghaishida	January 18, 1998	Xinglong	SCAP	·	2.9 km	MPC · JPL
91002	1998 BZ_{11}	—	January 23, 1998	Socorro	LINEAR	NYS	2.6 km	MPC · JPL
91003	1998 BZ_{15}	—	January 25, 1998	Haleakala	NEAT	V	2.0 km	MPC · JPL
91004	1998 BH_{16}	—	January 26, 1998	Haleakala	NEAT	·	3.8 km	MPC · JPL
91005	1998 BZ_{18}	—	January 24, 1998	Haleakala	NEAT	·	3.9 km	MPC · JPL
91006 Fleming	1998 BT_{25}	Fleming	January 28, 1998	Kleť	M. Tichý, Z. Moravec	MAR	1.9 km	MPC · JPL
91007 Ianfleming	1998 BL_{30}	Ianfleming	January 30, 1998	Kleť	J. Tichá, M. Tichý	·	3.6 km	MPC · JPL
91008	1998 BX_{36}	—	January 23, 1998	Kitt Peak	Spacewatch	·	2.4 km	MPC · JPL
91009	1998 BQ_{47}	—	January 26, 1998	Haleakala	NEAT	(5)	3.0 km	MPC · JPL
91010	1998 CD_{1}	—	February 1, 1998	Xinglong	SCAP	·	5.9 km	MPC · JPL
91011	1998 CH_{2}	—	February 8, 1998	Modra	A. Galád, Pravda, A.	·	1.9 km	MPC · JPL
91012	1998 DY	—	February 18, 1998	Kleť	Kleť	·	2.7 km	MPC · JPL
91013	1998 DG_{2}	—	February 20, 1998	Caussols	ODAS	·	3.7 km	MPC · JPL
91014	1998 DN_{12}	—	February 23, 1998	Kitt Peak	Spacewatch	·	2.8 km	MPC · JPL
91015	1998 DJ_{13}	—	February 25, 1998	Haleakala	NEAT	·	3.1 km	MPC · JPL
91016	1998 DS_{15}	—	February 22, 1998	Haleakala	NEAT	·	3.4 km	MPC · JPL
91017	1998 DA_{16}	—	February 25, 1998	Haleakala	NEAT	·	5.0 km	MPC · JPL
91018	1998 DA_{20}	—	February 20, 1998	Caussols	ODAS	NYS	2.4 km	MPC · JPL
91019	1998 DK_{20}	—	February 26, 1998	Blauvac	R. Roy	NYS	2.7 km	MPC · JPL
91020	1998 DQ_{22}	—	February 24, 1998	Kitt Peak	Spacewatch	·	2.6 km	MPC · JPL
91021	1998 DQ_{28}	—	February 26, 1998	Kitt Peak	Spacewatch	·	3.8 km	MPC · JPL
91022	1998 DV_{31}	—	February 19, 1998	Kushiro	S. Ueda, H. Kaneda	·	4.3 km	MPC · JPL
91023 Lutan	1998 DQ_{32}	Lutan	February 23, 1998	Xinglong	SCAP	BRG	4.8 km	MPC · JPL
91024 Széchenyi	1998 DA_{33}	Széchenyi	February 28, 1998	Piszkéstető	K. Sárneczky, L. Kiss	·	3.0 km	MPC · JPL
91025	1998 DJ_{34}	—	February 27, 1998	La Silla	E. W. Elst	EUN	2.9 km	MPC · JPL
91026	1998 DS_{34}	—	February 27, 1998	La Silla	E. W. Elst	·	4.0 km	MPC · JPL
91027	1998 DM_{35}	—	February 26, 1998	Reedy Creek	J. Broughton	·	3.4 km	MPC · JPL
91028	1998 DU_{37}	—	February 24, 1998	Kitt Peak	Spacewatch	·	3.0 km	MPC · JPL
91029	1998 EY	—	March 2, 1998	Caussols	ODAS	·	1.8 km	MPC · JPL
91030	1998 EV_{2}	—	March 2, 1998	Caussols	ODAS	GAL	2.9 km	MPC · JPL
91031	1998 EX_{2}	—	March 2, 1998	Caussols	ODAS	·	4.0 km	MPC · JPL
91032	1998 EA_{11}	—	March 1, 1998	La Silla	E. W. Elst	·	3.0 km	MPC · JPL
91033	1998 ES_{19}	—	March 3, 1998	La Silla	E. W. Elst	·	2.8 km	MPC · JPL
91034	1998 EH_{21}	—	March 1, 1998	Xinglong	SCAP	H	1.1 km	MPC · JPL
91035 Hezehui	1998 EM_{21}	Hezehui	March 5, 1998	Xinglong	SCAP	EUN	2.8 km	MPC · JPL
91036	1998 FC_{5}	—	March 22, 1998	Socorro	LINEAR	H	1.1 km	MPC · JPL
91037	1998 FF_{5}	—	March 24, 1998	Socorro	LINEAR	H	1.1 km	MPC · JPL
91038	1998 FW_{8}	—	March 22, 1998	Kitt Peak	Spacewatch	·	5.5 km	MPC · JPL
91039	1998 FA_{10}	—	March 24, 1998	Caussols	ODAS	·	5.6 km	MPC · JPL
91040	1998 FD_{14}	—	March 25, 1998	Haleakala	NEAT	·	3.1 km	MPC · JPL
91041	1998 FG_{14}	—	March 20, 1998	Socorro	LINEAR	H	1.3 km	MPC · JPL
91042	1998 FF_{15}	—	March 26, 1998	Kleť	Kleť	·	5.4 km	MPC · JPL
91043	1998 FG_{15}	—	March 20, 1998	Socorro	LINEAR	H	1.2 km	MPC · JPL
91044	1998 FX_{15}	—	March 22, 1998	Socorro	LINEAR	H	730 m	MPC · JPL
91045	1998 FA_{27}	—	March 20, 1998	Socorro	LINEAR	·	4.5 km	MPC · JPL
91046	1998 FT_{29}	—	March 20, 1998	Socorro	LINEAR	·	2.7 km	MPC · JPL
91047	1998 FT_{30}	—	March 20, 1998	Socorro	LINEAR	·	2.0 km	MPC · JPL
91048	1998 FO_{31}	—	March 20, 1998	Socorro	LINEAR	·	2.5 km	MPC · JPL
91049	1998 FN_{32}	—	March 20, 1998	Socorro	LINEAR	·	4.2 km	MPC · JPL
91050	1998 FU_{32}	—	March 20, 1998	Socorro	LINEAR	·	4.6 km	MPC · JPL
91051	1998 FA_{34}	—	March 20, 1998	Socorro	LINEAR	·	4.7 km	MPC · JPL
91052	1998 FW_{38}	—	March 20, 1998	Socorro	LINEAR	·	2.0 km	MPC · JPL
91053	1998 FE_{42}	—	March 20, 1998	Socorro	LINEAR	MRX	2.1 km	MPC · JPL
91054	1998 FB_{48}	—	March 20, 1998	Socorro	LINEAR	·	4.4 km	MPC · JPL
91055	1998 FD_{49}	—	March 20, 1998	Socorro	LINEAR	EUN	4.0 km	MPC · JPL
91056	1998 FG_{49}	—	March 20, 1998	Socorro	LINEAR	·	4.5 km	MPC · JPL
91057	1998 FR_{50}	—	March 20, 1998	Socorro	LINEAR	·	3.6 km	MPC · JPL
91058	1998 FU_{50}	—	March 20, 1998	Socorro	LINEAR	MAR	3.3 km	MPC · JPL
91059	1998 FE_{51}	—	March 20, 1998	Socorro	LINEAR	·	3.5 km	MPC · JPL
91060	1998 FS_{51}	—	March 20, 1998	Socorro	LINEAR	·	3.9 km	MPC · JPL
91061	1998 FN_{61}	—	March 20, 1998	Socorro	LINEAR	·	5.7 km	MPC · JPL
91062	1998 FH_{62}	—	March 20, 1998	Socorro	LINEAR	(5)	4.1 km	MPC · JPL
91063	1998 FX_{62}	—	March 20, 1998	Socorro	LINEAR	EUN	3.6 km	MPC · JPL
91064	1998 FL_{63}	—	March 20, 1998	Socorro	LINEAR	·	2.9 km	MPC · JPL
91065	1998 FM_{66}	—	March 20, 1998	Socorro	LINEAR	EUN	3.7 km	MPC · JPL
91066	1998 FP_{66}	—	March 20, 1998	Socorro	LINEAR	EUN	4.4 km	MPC · JPL
91067	1998 FC_{67}	—	March 20, 1998	Socorro	LINEAR	EUN	3.1 km	MPC · JPL
91068	1998 FP_{68}	—	March 20, 1998	Socorro	LINEAR	·	2.9 km	MPC · JPL
91069	1998 FK_{70}	—	March 20, 1998	Socorro	LINEAR	·	2.2 km	MPC · JPL
91070	1998 FO_{71}	—	March 20, 1998	Socorro	LINEAR	EUN	4.3 km	MPC · JPL
91071	1998 FY_{76}	—	March 24, 1998	Socorro	LINEAR	(5)	2.5 km	MPC · JPL
91072	1998 FC_{77}	—	March 24, 1998	Socorro	LINEAR	·	4.7 km	MPC · JPL
91073	1998 FN_{78}	—	March 24, 1998	Socorro	LINEAR	EUN	3.8 km	MPC · JPL
91074	1998 FT_{90}	—	March 24, 1998	Socorro	LINEAR	EUN	2.4 km	MPC · JPL
91075	1998 FT_{96}	—	March 31, 1998	Socorro	LINEAR	·	2.6 km	MPC · JPL
91076	1998 FU_{105}	—	March 31, 1998	Socorro	LINEAR	ADE	4.3 km	MPC · JPL
91077	1998 FN_{106}	—	March 31, 1998	Socorro	LINEAR	·	3.5 km	MPC · JPL
91078	1998 FX_{106}	—	March 31, 1998	Socorro	LINEAR	·	4.1 km	MPC · JPL
91079	1998 FB_{107}	—	March 31, 1998	Socorro	LINEAR	slow	2.1 km	MPC · JPL
91080	1998 FX_{107}	—	March 31, 1998	Socorro	LINEAR	ADE	5.8 km	MPC · JPL
91081	1998 FR_{109}	—	March 31, 1998	Socorro	LINEAR	·	2.4 km	MPC · JPL
91082	1998 FA_{110}	—	March 31, 1998	Socorro	LINEAR	·	2.7 km	MPC · JPL
91083	1998 FR_{110}	—	March 31, 1998	Socorro	LINEAR	·	3.7 km	MPC · JPL
91084	1998 FT_{118}	—	March 31, 1998	Socorro	LINEAR	·	2.2 km	MPC · JPL
91085	1998 FK_{119}	—	March 31, 1998	Socorro	LINEAR	EUN	2.6 km	MPC · JPL
91086	1998 FF_{120}	—	March 20, 1998	Socorro	LINEAR	EUN	2.0 km	MPC · JPL
91087	1998 FO_{120}	—	March 20, 1998	Socorro	LINEAR	·	5.3 km	MPC · JPL
91088	1998 FQ_{120}	—	March 20, 1998	Socorro	LINEAR	·	2.4 km	MPC · JPL
91089	1998 FW_{126}	—	March 24, 1998	Xinglong	SCAP	·	2.7 km	MPC · JPL
91090	1998 FG_{127}	—	March 29, 1998	Socorro	LINEAR	H	1.1 km	MPC · JPL
91091	1998 FD_{129}	—	March 22, 1998	Socorro	LINEAR	H	1.3 km	MPC · JPL
91092	1998 FA_{135}	—	March 20, 1998	Socorro	LINEAR	·	3.0 km	MPC · JPL
91093	1998 GS	—	April 3, 1998	Kitt Peak	Spacewatch	MAR	3.1 km	MPC · JPL
91094	1998 GF_{7}	—	April 2, 1998	Socorro	LINEAR	EUN	3.1 km	MPC · JPL
91095	1998 GZ_{8}	—	April 2, 1998	Socorro	LINEAR	·	5.5 km	MPC · JPL
91096	1998 GK_{11}	—	April 15, 1998	Socorro	LINEAR	PHO	2.6 km	MPC · JPL
91097	1998 GK_{12}	—	April 2, 1998	La Silla	E. W. Elst	·	2.5 km	MPC · JPL
91098	1998 HB_{3}	—	April 21, 1998	Socorro	LINEAR	H	1.1 km	MPC · JPL
91099	1998 HK_{7}	—	April 23, 1998	Socorro	LINEAR	PHO	4.6 km	MPC · JPL
91100	1998 HK_{14}	—	April 25, 1998	Haleakala	NEAT	·	3.5 km	MPC · JPL

== 91101–91200 ==
back to top

Designation			Discovery			Properties		Ref
Permanent	Provisional	Named after	Date	Site	Discoverer(s)	Category	Diam.	Ref
91101	1998 HK_{15}	—	April 20, 1998	Kitt Peak	Spacewatch	EUN	3.0 km	MPC · JPL
91102	1998 HL_{19}	—	April 18, 1998	Socorro	LINEAR	·	2.6 km	MPC · JPL
91103	1998 HG_{21}	—	April 20, 1998	Socorro	LINEAR	·	4.4 km	MPC · JPL
91104	1998 HH_{25}	—	April 18, 1998	Kitt Peak	Spacewatch	·	3.6 km	MPC · JPL
91105	1998 HP_{25}	—	April 18, 1998	Kitt Peak	Spacewatch	HOF	4.4 km	MPC · JPL
91106	1998 HF_{29}	—	April 20, 1998	Socorro	LINEAR	·	3.4 km	MPC · JPL
91107	1998 HY_{34}	—	April 20, 1998	Socorro	LINEAR	·	4.9 km	MPC · JPL
91108	1998 HX_{37}	—	April 20, 1998	Socorro	LINEAR	EUN	3.2 km	MPC · JPL
91109	1998 HG_{38}	—	April 20, 1998	Socorro	LINEAR	MAR	4.9 km	MPC · JPL
91110	1998 HF_{45}	—	April 20, 1998	Socorro	LINEAR	·	2.7 km	MPC · JPL
91111	1998 HU_{47}	—	April 20, 1998	Socorro	LINEAR	·	5.5 km	MPC · JPL
91112	1998 HJ_{52}	—	April 25, 1998	Woomera	F. B. Zoltowski	RAF	3.6 km	MPC · JPL
91113	1998 HA_{53}	—	April 21, 1998	Socorro	LINEAR	·	4.1 km	MPC · JPL
91114	1998 HF_{60}	—	April 21, 1998	Socorro	LINEAR	BRA	3.1 km	MPC · JPL
91115	1998 HB_{73}	—	April 21, 1998	Socorro	LINEAR	·	6.8 km	MPC · JPL
91116	1998 HD_{75}	—	April 21, 1998	Socorro	LINEAR	·	3.4 km	MPC · JPL
91117	1998 HT_{79}	—	April 21, 1998	Socorro	LINEAR	·	3.8 km	MPC · JPL
91118	1998 HU_{88}	—	April 21, 1998	Socorro	LINEAR	NEM	5.4 km	MPC · JPL
91119	1998 HV_{88}	—	April 21, 1998	Socorro	LINEAR	·	3.4 km	MPC · JPL
91120	1998 HR_{99}	—	April 21, 1998	Socorro	LINEAR	·	5.5 km	MPC · JPL
91121	1998 HS_{105}	—	April 23, 1998	Socorro	LINEAR	·	3.9 km	MPC · JPL
91122	1998 HE_{112}	—	April 23, 1998	Socorro	LINEAR	·	2.8 km	MPC · JPL
91123	1998 HP_{114}	—	April 23, 1998	Socorro	LINEAR	·	5.3 km	MPC · JPL
91124	1998 HA_{118}	—	April 23, 1998	Socorro	LINEAR	DOR	5.7 km	MPC · JPL
91125	1998 HT_{118}	—	April 23, 1998	Socorro	LINEAR	EUN	2.4 km	MPC · JPL
91126	1998 HZ_{120}	—	April 23, 1998	Socorro	LINEAR	EUN	3.3 km	MPC · JPL
91127	1998 HY_{122}	—	April 23, 1998	Socorro	LINEAR	·	4.4 km	MPC · JPL
91128	1998 HV_{133}	—	April 19, 1998	Socorro	LINEAR	·	4.8 km	MPC · JPL
91129	1998 HT_{135}	—	April 19, 1998	Socorro	LINEAR	·	3.3 km	MPC · JPL
91130	1998 HQ_{142}	—	April 21, 1998	Socorro	LINEAR	·	3.2 km	MPC · JPL
91131	1998 HX_{144}	—	April 21, 1998	Socorro	LINEAR	·	4.4 km	MPC · JPL
91132	1998 HL_{150}	—	April 20, 1998	Socorro	LINEAR	·	3.5 km	MPC · JPL
91133	1998 HK_{151}	—	April 28, 1998	Mauna Kea	Mauna Kea	plutino · critical	146 km	MPC · JPL
91134	1998 HC_{154}	—	April 29, 1998	Kitt Peak	Spacewatch	·	6.0 km	MPC · JPL
91135	1998 HC_{155}	—	April 19, 1998	Socorro	LINEAR	·	4.0 km	MPC · JPL
91136	1998 KK_{6}	—	May 22, 1998	Socorro	LINEAR	·	6.5 km	MPC · JPL
91137	1998 KD_{29}	—	May 22, 1998	Socorro	LINEAR	EUN	3.4 km	MPC · JPL
91138	1998 KO_{30}	—	May 22, 1998	Socorro	LINEAR	·	2.3 km	MPC · JPL
91139	1998 KL_{47}	—	May 22, 1998	Socorro	LINEAR	EUN	3.9 km	MPC · JPL
91140	1998 LW_{1}	—	June 1, 1998	La Silla	E. W. Elst	·	4.7 km	MPC · JPL
91141	1998 LF_{3}	—	June 3, 1998	Socorro	LINEAR	·	8.3 km	MPC · JPL
91142	1998 MP_{2}	—	June 20, 1998	Caussols	ODAS	·	5.1 km	MPC · JPL
91143	1998 MC_{6}	—	June 19, 1998	Kitt Peak	Spacewatch	KOR	2.8 km	MPC · JPL
91144	1998 MK_{34}	—	June 24, 1998	Socorro	LINEAR	·	5.3 km	MPC · JPL
91145	1998 OX	—	July 20, 1998	Caussols	ODAS	·	5.8 km	MPC · JPL
91146	1998 OA_{1}	—	July 20, 1998	San Marcello	M. Tombelli, L. Tesi	EMA	6.6 km	MPC · JPL
91147	1998 OM_{2}	—	July 16, 1998	Kitt Peak	Spacewatch	·	4.3 km	MPC · JPL
91148	1998 OY_{2}	—	July 20, 1998	Caussols	ODAS	·	4.3 km	MPC · JPL
91149	1998 PS	—	August 15, 1998	Prescott	P. G. Comba	THM	4.0 km	MPC · JPL
91150	1998 QA_{30}	—	August 26, 1998	Xinglong	SCAP	·	7.9 km	MPC · JPL
91151	1998 QJ_{39}	—	August 17, 1998	Socorro	LINEAR	·	8.5 km	MPC · JPL
91152	1998 QW_{41}	—	August 17, 1998	Socorro	LINEAR	·	12 km	MPC · JPL
91153	1998 QP_{44}	—	August 17, 1998	Socorro	LINEAR	THM	4.9 km	MPC · JPL
91154	1998 QM_{50}	—	August 17, 1998	Socorro	LINEAR	·	8.9 km	MPC · JPL
91155	1998 QW_{50}	—	August 17, 1998	Socorro	LINEAR	·	10 km	MPC · JPL
91156	1998 QS_{60}	—	August 31, 1998	Modra	Galád, A., Tóth	·	6.2 km	MPC · JPL
91157	1998 QG_{62}	—	August 26, 1998	Xinglong	SCAP	·	6.6 km	MPC · JPL
91158	1998 QG_{70}	—	August 24, 1998	Socorro	LINEAR	URS	9.1 km	MPC · JPL
91159	1998 QA_{73}	—	August 24, 1998	Socorro	LINEAR	·	8.9 km	MPC · JPL
91160	1998 QJ_{74}	—	August 24, 1998	Socorro	LINEAR	·	7.1 km	MPC · JPL
91161	1998 QN_{74}	—	August 24, 1998	Socorro	LINEAR	EUP	6.7 km	MPC · JPL
91162	1998 QX_{75}	—	August 24, 1998	Socorro	LINEAR	·	7.3 km	MPC · JPL
91163	1998 QZ_{82}	—	August 24, 1998	Socorro	LINEAR	·	12 km	MPC · JPL
91164	1998 QE_{84}	—	August 24, 1998	Socorro	LINEAR	·	11 km	MPC · JPL
91165	1998 QF_{84}	—	August 24, 1998	Socorro	LINEAR	·	8.2 km	MPC · JPL
91166	1998 QT_{84}	—	August 24, 1998	Socorro	LINEAR	INA	8.0 km	MPC · JPL
91167	1998 QM_{85}	—	August 24, 1998	Socorro	LINEAR	·	6.4 km	MPC · JPL
91168	1998 QA_{86}	—	August 24, 1998	Socorro	LINEAR	URS	7.6 km	MPC · JPL
91169	1998 QT_{108}	—	August 17, 1998	Socorro	LINEAR	HYG	6.8 km	MPC · JPL
91170	1998 QS_{109}	—	August 21, 1998	Haleakala	NEAT	·	6.1 km	MPC · JPL
91171	1998 QG_{110}	—	August 23, 1998	Socorro	LINEAR	·	8.3 km	MPC · JPL
91172	1998 RG_{5}	—	September 15, 1998	Caussols	ODAS	VER	5.7 km	MPC · JPL
91173	1998 RN_{7}	—	September 12, 1998	Kitt Peak	Spacewatch	EOS	3.3 km	MPC · JPL
91174	1998 RC_{18}	—	September 14, 1998	Socorro	LINEAR	·	4.3 km	MPC · JPL
91175	1998 RX_{18}	—	September 14, 1998	Socorro	LINEAR	·	6.6 km	MPC · JPL
91176	1998 RE_{19}	—	September 14, 1998	Socorro	LINEAR	·	8.6 km	MPC · JPL
91177	1998 RJ_{22}	—	September 14, 1998	Socorro	LINEAR	·	7.0 km	MPC · JPL
91178	1998 RV_{23}	—	September 14, 1998	Socorro	LINEAR	HYG	6.8 km	MPC · JPL
91179	1998 RR_{26}	—	September 14, 1998	Socorro	LINEAR	·	5.7 km	MPC · JPL
91180	1998 RS_{34}	—	September 14, 1998	Socorro	LINEAR	THM	4.7 km	MPC · JPL
91181	1998 RV_{38}	—	September 14, 1998	Socorro	LINEAR	·	7.1 km	MPC · JPL
91182	1998 RO_{49}	—	September 14, 1998	Socorro	LINEAR	2:1J	5.0 km	MPC · JPL
91183	1998 RZ_{49}	—	September 14, 1998	Socorro	LINEAR	·	8.3 km	MPC · JPL
91184	1998 RA_{51}	—	September 14, 1998	Socorro	LINEAR	·	6.7 km	MPC · JPL
91185	1998 RM_{57}	—	September 14, 1998	Socorro	LINEAR	·	7.1 km	MPC · JPL
91186	1998 RO_{66}	—	September 14, 1998	Socorro	LINEAR	·	5.2 km	MPC · JPL
91187	1998 RW_{66}	—	September 14, 1998	Socorro	LINEAR	·	10 km	MPC · JPL
91188	1998 RP_{77}	—	September 14, 1998	Socorro	LINEAR	·	6.9 km	MPC · JPL
91189	1998 SM_{1}	—	September 16, 1998	Caussols	ODAS	T_{j} (2.91)	8.4 km	MPC · JPL
91190	1998 SV_{49}	—	September 29, 1998	Socorro	LINEAR	HYG	7.9 km	MPC · JPL
91191	1998 SE_{55}	—	September 16, 1998	Anderson Mesa	LONEOS	·	10 km	MPC · JPL
91192	1998 SA_{58}	—	September 17, 1998	Anderson Mesa	LONEOS	URS	12 km	MPC · JPL
91193	1998 ST_{76}	—	September 19, 1998	Socorro	LINEAR	·	7.3 km	MPC · JPL
91194	1998 SB_{85}	—	September 26, 1998	Socorro	LINEAR	URS	9.0 km	MPC · JPL
91195	1998 SC_{90}	—	September 26, 1998	Socorro	LINEAR	·	7.9 km	MPC · JPL
91196	1998 SV_{107}	—	September 26, 1998	Socorro	LINEAR	·	7.1 km	MPC · JPL
91197	1998 SD_{115}	—	September 26, 1998	Socorro	LINEAR	·	6.2 km	MPC · JPL
91198	1998 SS_{137}	—	September 26, 1998	Socorro	LINEAR	·	6.6 km	MPC · JPL
91199 Johngray	1998 SS_{147}	Johngray	September 20, 1998	La Silla	E. W. Elst	·	10 km	MPC · JPL
91200	1998 SM_{153}	—	September 26, 1998	Socorro	LINEAR	(895)	8.3 km	MPC · JPL

== 91201–91300 ==
back to top

Designation			Discovery			Properties		Ref
Permanent	Provisional	Named after	Date	Site	Discoverer(s)	Category	Diam.	Ref
91201	1998 SC_{162}	—	September 26, 1998	Socorro	LINEAR	URS	8.8 km	MPC · JPL
91202	1998 SY_{170}	—	September 25, 1998	Anderson Mesa	LONEOS	·	6.2 km	MPC · JPL
91203	1998 UE_{18}	—	October 19, 1998	Xinglong	SCAP	·	1.5 km	MPC · JPL
91204	1998 UW_{32}	—	October 28, 1998	Socorro	LINEAR	·	10 km	MPC · JPL
91205	1998 US_{43}	—	October 22, 1998	Kitt Peak	M. W. Buie	plutino	109 km	MPC · JPL
91206	1998 WY_{7}	—	November 24, 1998	Višnjan Observatory	K. Korlević	·	1.9 km	MPC · JPL
91207	1998 XW_{27}	—	December 14, 1998	Socorro	LINEAR	·	11 km	MPC · JPL
91208	1998 XO_{58}	—	December 15, 1998	Socorro	LINEAR	·	1.7 km	MPC · JPL
91209	1998 XH_{72}	—	December 14, 1998	Socorro	LINEAR	·	1.6 km	MPC · JPL
91210	1998 XS_{96}	—	December 11, 1998	Mérida	Naranjo, O. A.	·	1.1 km	MPC · JPL
91211	1998 YJ_{2}	—	December 17, 1998	Caussols	ODAS	·	2.1 km	MPC · JPL
91212 Virgiliogonano	1998 YQ_{7}	Virgiliogonano	December 24, 1998	Catalina	CSS	PHO	4.3 km	MPC · JPL
91213 Botchan	1998 YZ_{7}	Botchan	December 22, 1998	Kuma Kogen	A. Nakamura	·	1.2 km	MPC · JPL
91214 Diclemente	1998 YB_{10}	Diclemente	December 23, 1998	San Marcello	A. Boattini, L. Tesi	·	1.2 km	MPC · JPL
91215	1999 AN	—	January 5, 1999	Ondřejov	L. Kotková, Vašta, L.	NYS	2.1 km	MPC · JPL
91216	1999 AU_{3}	—	January 10, 1999	Oizumi	T. Kobayashi	·	2.4 km	MPC · JPL
91217	1999 AM_{4}	—	January 11, 1999	Oizumi	T. Kobayashi	·	2.2 km	MPC · JPL
91218	1999 AM_{5}	—	January 10, 1999	Nachi-Katsuura	Y. Shimizu, T. Urata	·	2.8 km	MPC · JPL
91219	1999 AN_{7}	—	January 11, 1999	Višnjan Observatory	K. Korlević	·	1.5 km	MPC · JPL
91220	1999 AA_{8}	—	January 13, 1999	Oizumi	T. Kobayashi	·	2.4 km	MPC · JPL
91221	1999 AM_{15}	—	January 9, 1999	Kitt Peak	Spacewatch	·	1.9 km	MPC · JPL
91222	1999 AH_{16}	—	January 9, 1999	Kitt Peak	Spacewatch	·	1.4 km	MPC · JPL
91223	1999 AK_{20}	—	January 13, 1999	Kitt Peak	Spacewatch	MAS	1.6 km	MPC · JPL
91224	1999 BH	—	January 16, 1999	Oizumi	T. Kobayashi	·	1.6 km	MPC · JPL
91225	1999 BL_{3}	—	January 20, 1999	Kleť	Kleť	NYS ·	4.6 km	MPC · JPL
91226	1999 BK_{7}	—	January 22, 1999	Kleť	Kleť	·	2.5 km	MPC · JPL
91227	1999 BG_{9}	—	January 22, 1999	Višnjan Observatory	K. Korlević	·	1.5 km	MPC · JPL
91228	1999 BG_{13}	—	January 24, 1999	Višnjan Observatory	K. Korlević	·	2.2 km	MPC · JPL
91229	1999 BN_{15}	—	January 26, 1999	Višnjan Observatory	K. Korlević	·	6.2 km	MPC · JPL
91230	1999 BK_{16}	—	January 16, 1999	Socorro	LINEAR	·	2.7 km	MPC · JPL
91231	1999 BP_{24}	—	January 18, 1999	Socorro	LINEAR	·	2.6 km	MPC · JPL
91232	1999 BE_{25}	—	January 18, 1999	Socorro	LINEAR	·	2.5 km	MPC · JPL
91233	1999 CL_{1}	—	February 6, 1999	Dynic	Ikari, Y.	·	2.1 km	MPC · JPL
91234	1999 CN_{1}	—	February 7, 1999	Oizumi	T. Kobayashi	·	2.5 km	MPC · JPL
91235	1999 CQ_{1}	—	February 7, 1999	Oizumi	T. Kobayashi	·	2.5 km	MPC · JPL
91236	1999 CP_{4}	—	February 6, 1999	Višnjan Observatory	K. Korlević	·	3.8 km	MPC · JPL
91237	1999 CY_{7}	—	February 10, 1999	Socorro	LINEAR	PHO	3.4 km	MPC · JPL
91238	1999 CB_{9}	—	February 13, 1999	Socorro	LINEAR	·	1.9 km	MPC · JPL
91239	1999 CA_{10}	—	February 15, 1999	Baton Rouge	Baton Rouge	NYS	2.4 km	MPC · JPL
91240	1999 CM_{27}	—	February 10, 1999	Socorro	LINEAR	·	1.7 km	MPC · JPL
91241	1999 CY_{28}	—	February 10, 1999	Socorro	LINEAR	NYS	1.9 km	MPC · JPL
91242	1999 CX_{32}	—	February 10, 1999	Socorro	LINEAR	·	2.5 km	MPC · JPL
91243	1999 CO_{33}	—	February 10, 1999	Socorro	LINEAR	NYS	1.3 km	MPC · JPL
91244	1999 CP_{33}	—	February 10, 1999	Socorro	LINEAR	·	1.7 km	MPC · JPL
91245	1999 CN_{34}	—	February 10, 1999	Socorro	LINEAR	·	4.6 km	MPC · JPL
91246	1999 CE_{35}	—	February 10, 1999	Socorro	LINEAR	·	1.6 km	MPC · JPL
91247	1999 CM_{40}	—	February 10, 1999	Socorro	LINEAR	·	2.3 km	MPC · JPL
91248	1999 CC_{44}	—	February 10, 1999	Socorro	LINEAR	·	2.7 km	MPC · JPL
91249	1999 CQ_{44}	—	February 10, 1999	Socorro	LINEAR	·	2.0 km	MPC · JPL
91250	1999 CZ_{46}	—	February 10, 1999	Socorro	LINEAR	·	3.5 km	MPC · JPL
91251	1999 CN_{49}	—	February 10, 1999	Socorro	LINEAR	·	1.9 km	MPC · JPL
91252	1999 CS_{49}	—	February 10, 1999	Socorro	LINEAR	PHO	3.5 km	MPC · JPL
91253	1999 CM_{65}	—	February 12, 1999	Socorro	LINEAR	·	2.1 km	MPC · JPL
91254	1999 CB_{79}	—	February 12, 1999	Socorro	LINEAR	·	2.1 km	MPC · JPL
91255	1999 CJ_{79}	—	February 12, 1999	Socorro	LINEAR	NYS	1.7 km	MPC · JPL
91256	1999 CX_{80}	—	February 12, 1999	Socorro	LINEAR	fast	3.1 km	MPC · JPL
91257	1999 CG_{82}	—	February 13, 1999	Monte Agliale	Mazzoni, E.	·	1.6 km	MPC · JPL
91258	1999 CE_{84}	—	February 10, 1999	Socorro	LINEAR	·	1.9 km	MPC · JPL
91259	1999 CB_{85}	—	February 10, 1999	Socorro	LINEAR	·	2.4 km	MPC · JPL
91260	1999 CK_{87}	—	February 10, 1999	Socorro	LINEAR	·	2.4 km	MPC · JPL
91261	1999 CY_{94}	—	February 10, 1999	Socorro	LINEAR	(2076)	1.8 km	MPC · JPL
91262	1999 CM_{99}	—	February 10, 1999	Socorro	LINEAR	V	1.5 km	MPC · JPL
91263	1999 CD_{104}	—	February 12, 1999	Socorro	LINEAR	·	1.6 km	MPC · JPL
91264	1999 CO_{104}	—	February 12, 1999	Socorro	LINEAR	NYS	2.6 km	MPC · JPL
91265	1999 CY_{108}	—	February 12, 1999	Socorro	LINEAR	·	3.9 km	MPC · JPL
91266	1999 CV_{112}	—	February 12, 1999	Socorro	LINEAR	·	1.9 km	MPC · JPL
91267	1999 CY_{113}	—	February 12, 1999	Socorro	LINEAR	V	1.6 km	MPC · JPL
91268	1999 CT_{135}	—	February 8, 1999	Kitt Peak	Spacewatch	·	2.3 km	MPC · JPL
91269	1999 CW_{136}	—	February 9, 1999	Kitt Peak	Spacewatch	·	2.2 km	MPC · JPL
91270	1999 CA_{138}	—	February 9, 1999	Kitt Peak	Spacewatch	·	3.7 km	MPC · JPL
91271	1999 CB_{147}	—	February 9, 1999	Kitt Peak	Spacewatch	·	1.5 km	MPC · JPL
91272	1999 CR_{151}	—	February 10, 1999	Kitt Peak	Spacewatch	·	1.9 km	MPC · JPL
91273	1999 DN	—	February 16, 1999	Caussols	ODAS	HIL · 3:2	10 km	MPC · JPL
91274	1999 DM_{3}	—	February 18, 1999	Višnjan Observatory	K. Korlević, M. Jurić	·	2.2 km	MPC · JPL
91275 Billsmith	1999 EW_{5}	Billsmith	March 13, 1999	Goodricke-Pigott	R. A. Tucker	NYS	2.1 km	MPC · JPL
91276	1999 EH_{6}	—	March 14, 1999	Kitt Peak	Spacewatch	·	3.0 km	MPC · JPL
91277	1999 EW_{6}	—	March 14, 1999	Kitt Peak	Spacewatch	·	4.1 km	MPC · JPL
91278	1999 EC_{7}	—	March 14, 1999	Kitt Peak	Spacewatch	·	2.1 km	MPC · JPL
91279	1999 EN_{8}	—	March 14, 1999	Kitt Peak	Spacewatch	·	2.7 km	MPC · JPL
91280	1999 EO_{11}	—	March 15, 1999	Kitt Peak	Spacewatch	MAS	1.5 km	MPC · JPL
91281	1999 EQ_{11}	—	March 12, 1999	Socorro	LINEAR	PHO	5.6 km	MPC · JPL
91282	1999 FL_{1}	—	March 16, 1999	Kitt Peak	Spacewatch	·	2.5 km	MPC · JPL
91283	1999 FE_{2}	—	March 16, 1999	Kitt Peak	Spacewatch	ERI	1.8 km	MPC · JPL
91284	1999 FE_{7}	—	March 19, 1999	Fountain Hills	C. W. Juels	·	3.0 km	MPC · JPL
91285	1999 FP_{9}	—	March 22, 1999	Anderson Mesa	LONEOS	PHO	5.0 km	MPC · JPL
91286	1999 FB_{17}	—	March 23, 1999	Kitt Peak	Spacewatch	MAS	1.8 km	MPC · JPL
91287 Simon-Garfunkel	1999 FP_{21}	Simon-Garfunkel	March 21, 1999	Wykrota	C. Jacques	·	1.7 km	MPC · JPL
91288	1999 FZ_{21}	—	March 19, 1999	Socorro	LINEAR	·	4.4 km	MPC · JPL
91289	1999 FN_{22}	—	March 19, 1999	Socorro	LINEAR	·	2.3 km	MPC · JPL
91290	1999 FR_{25}	—	March 19, 1999	Socorro	LINEAR	·	3.1 km	MPC · JPL
91291	1999 FD_{27}	—	March 19, 1999	Socorro	LINEAR	·	3.0 km	MPC · JPL
91292	1999 FF_{27}	—	March 19, 1999	Socorro	LINEAR	·	3.0 km	MPC · JPL
91293	1999 FD_{28}	—	March 19, 1999	Socorro	LINEAR	·	7.3 km	MPC · JPL
91294	1999 FD_{29}	—	March 19, 1999	Socorro	LINEAR	·	2.1 km	MPC · JPL
91295	1999 FK_{29}	—	March 19, 1999	Socorro	LINEAR	·	2.0 km	MPC · JPL
91296	1999 FW_{29}	—	March 19, 1999	Socorro	LINEAR	·	2.9 km	MPC · JPL
91297	1999 FD_{31}	—	March 19, 1999	Socorro	LINEAR	V	1.6 km	MPC · JPL
91298	1999 FQ_{31}	—	March 19, 1999	Socorro	LINEAR	·	3.0 km	MPC · JPL
91299	1999 FL_{32}	—	March 19, 1999	Socorro	LINEAR	·	2.1 km	MPC · JPL
91300	1999 FZ_{34}	—	March 19, 1999	Socorro	LINEAR	·	2.3 km	MPC · JPL

== 91301–91400 ==
back to top

Designation			Discovery			Properties		Ref
Permanent	Provisional	Named after	Date	Site	Discoverer(s)	Category	Diam.	Ref
91301	1999 FM_{36}	—	March 20, 1999	Socorro	LINEAR	·	2.4 km	MPC · JPL
91302	1999 FU_{36}	—	March 20, 1999	Socorro	LINEAR	·	3.0 km	MPC · JPL
91303	1999 FG_{41}	—	March 20, 1999	Socorro	LINEAR	·	1.6 km	MPC · JPL
91304	1999 FU_{44}	—	March 20, 1999	Socorro	LINEAR	HIL · 3:2 · (6124)	20 km	MPC · JPL
91305	1999 FK_{46}	—	March 20, 1999	Socorro	LINEAR	·	2.3 km	MPC · JPL
91306	1999 FE_{47}	—	March 20, 1999	Socorro	LINEAR	NYS	2.1 km	MPC · JPL
91307	1999 FU_{48}	—	March 20, 1999	Socorro	LINEAR	·	2.3 km	MPC · JPL
91308	1999 FY_{52}	—	March 20, 1999	Socorro	LINEAR	·	2.7 km	MPC · JPL
91309	1999 FB_{55}	—	March 20, 1999	Socorro	LINEAR	slow	3.3 km	MPC · JPL
91310	1999 GH_{5}	—	April 6, 1999	Xinglong	SCAP	·	1.9 km	MPC · JPL
91311	1999 GB_{7}	—	April 15, 1999	Socorro	LINEAR	PHO	2.5 km	MPC · JPL
91312	1999 GE_{7}	—	April 13, 1999	Višnjan Observatory	K. Korlević, M. Jurić	PHO	4.7 km	MPC · JPL
91313	1999 GR_{7}	—	April 7, 1999	Anderson Mesa	LONEOS	MAS	2.0 km	MPC · JPL
91314	1999 GB_{8}	—	April 9, 1999	Anderson Mesa	LONEOS	·	2.5 km	MPC · JPL
91315	1999 GM_{8}	—	April 9, 1999	Anderson Mesa	LONEOS	·	2.4 km	MPC · JPL
91316	1999 GW_{13}	—	April 14, 1999	Kitt Peak	Spacewatch	·	1.7 km	MPC · JPL
91317	1999 GV_{17}	—	April 15, 1999	Socorro	LINEAR	·	2.0 km	MPC · JPL
91318	1999 GO_{18}	—	April 15, 1999	Socorro	LINEAR	·	5.4 km	MPC · JPL
91319	1999 GR_{24}	—	April 6, 1999	Socorro	LINEAR	·	1.7 km	MPC · JPL
91320	1999 GS_{24}	—	April 6, 1999	Socorro	LINEAR	NYS	1.6 km	MPC · JPL
91321	1999 GX_{25}	—	April 7, 1999	Socorro	LINEAR	KON	4.6 km	MPC · JPL
91322	1999 GK_{31}	—	April 7, 1999	Socorro	LINEAR	EUN	3.3 km	MPC · JPL
91323	1999 GG_{35}	—	April 6, 1999	Socorro	LINEAR	·	1.7 km	MPC · JPL
91324	1999 GN_{42}	—	April 12, 1999	Socorro	LINEAR	V	1.5 km	MPC · JPL
91325	1999 GD_{47}	—	April 6, 1999	Anderson Mesa	LONEOS	·	4.2 km	MPC · JPL
91326	1999 GV_{51}	—	April 11, 1999	Anderson Mesa	LONEOS	·	3.1 km	MPC · JPL
91327	1999 GK_{53}	—	April 11, 1999	Anderson Mesa	LONEOS	·	3.3 km	MPC · JPL
91328	1999 GY_{62}	—	April 12, 1999	Kitt Peak	Spacewatch	·	2.1 km	MPC · JPL
91329	1999 GK_{63}	—	April 9, 1999	Anderson Mesa	LONEOS	·	1.6 km	MPC · JPL
91330	1999 HM_{2}	—	April 20, 1999	Kleť	Kleť	·	2.0 km	MPC · JPL
91331	1999 HX_{4}	—	April 17, 1999	Kitt Peak	Spacewatch	·	1.7 km	MPC · JPL
91332	1999 HZ_{9}	—	April 17, 1999	Socorro	LINEAR	V	1.6 km	MPC · JPL
91333 Robertogorelli	1999 JP_{2}	Robertogorelli	May 8, 1999	Catalina	CSS	·	3.6 km	MPC · JPL
91334	1999 JK_{8}	—	May 12, 1999	Socorro	LINEAR	·	2.5 km	MPC · JPL
91335 Alexandrov	1999 JT_{9}	Alexandrov	May 8, 1999	Catalina	CSS	·	4.1 km	MPC · JPL
91336	1999 JW_{13}	—	May 10, 1999	Socorro	LINEAR	·	4.4 km	MPC · JPL
91337	1999 JG_{14}	—	May 13, 1999	Socorro	LINEAR	·	5.2 km	MPC · JPL
91338	1999 JR_{14}	—	May 10, 1999	Socorro	LINEAR	V	2.4 km	MPC · JPL
91339	1999 JR_{15}	—	May 10, 1999	Socorro	LINEAR	(194) · slow	6.4 km	MPC · JPL
91340	1999 JZ_{20}	—	May 10, 1999	Socorro	LINEAR	NYS	2.4 km	MPC · JPL
91341	1999 JC_{25}	—	May 10, 1999	Socorro	LINEAR	·	2.5 km	MPC · JPL
91342	1999 JU_{29}	—	May 10, 1999	Socorro	LINEAR	·	2.8 km	MPC · JPL
91343	1999 JP_{30}	—	May 10, 1999	Socorro	LINEAR	·	4.6 km	MPC · JPL
91344	1999 JQ_{30}	—	May 10, 1999	Socorro	LINEAR	·	1.8 km	MPC · JPL
91345	1999 JK_{36}	—	May 10, 1999	Socorro	LINEAR	ERI	5.6 km	MPC · JPL
91346	1999 JR_{37}	—	May 10, 1999	Socorro	LINEAR	·	3.2 km	MPC · JPL
91347	1999 JL_{39}	—	May 10, 1999	Socorro	LINEAR	·	3.3 km	MPC · JPL
91348	1999 JF_{45}	—	May 10, 1999	Socorro	LINEAR	·	3.1 km	MPC · JPL
91349	1999 JR_{51}	—	May 10, 1999	Socorro	LINEAR	·	2.3 km	MPC · JPL
91350	1999 JR_{53}	—	May 10, 1999	Socorro	LINEAR	·	1.9 km	MPC · JPL
91351	1999 JK_{54}	—	May 10, 1999	Socorro	LINEAR	·	4.2 km	MPC · JPL
91352	1999 JH_{55}	—	May 10, 1999	Socorro	LINEAR	·	5.6 km	MPC · JPL
91353	1999 JX_{55}	—	May 10, 1999	Socorro	LINEAR	·	2.9 km	MPC · JPL
91354	1999 JY_{55}	—	May 10, 1999	Socorro	LINEAR	·	2.5 km	MPC · JPL
91355	1999 JA_{57}	—	May 10, 1999	Socorro	LINEAR	·	3.4 km	MPC · JPL
91356	1999 JC_{58}	—	May 10, 1999	Socorro	LINEAR	·	1.8 km	MPC · JPL
91357	1999 JA_{65}	—	May 10, 1999	Socorro	LINEAR	·	4.7 km	MPC · JPL
91358	1999 JL_{65}	—	May 12, 1999	Socorro	LINEAR	·	3.1 km	MPC · JPL
91359	1999 JE_{66}	—	May 12, 1999	Socorro	LINEAR	·	3.8 km	MPC · JPL
91360	1999 JZ_{66}	—	May 12, 1999	Socorro	LINEAR	V	3.1 km	MPC · JPL
91361	1999 JW_{68}	—	May 12, 1999	Socorro	LINEAR	EUN	2.2 km	MPC · JPL
91362	1999 JN_{71}	—	May 12, 1999	Socorro	LINEAR	EUN	2.6 km	MPC · JPL
91363	1999 JM_{72}	—	May 12, 1999	Socorro	LINEAR	·	2.3 km	MPC · JPL
91364	1999 JY_{78}	—	May 13, 1999	Socorro	LINEAR	·	2.4 km	MPC · JPL
91365	1999 JL_{84}	—	May 12, 1999	Socorro	LINEAR	·	3.5 km	MPC · JPL
91366	1999 JT_{84}	—	May 12, 1999	Socorro	LINEAR	·	4.6 km	MPC · JPL
91367	1999 JE_{86}	—	May 12, 1999	Socorro	LINEAR	·	3.5 km	MPC · JPL
91368	1999 JB_{89}	—	May 12, 1999	Socorro	LINEAR	·	5.9 km	MPC · JPL
91369	1999 JW_{90}	—	May 12, 1999	Socorro	LINEAR	EUN	2.0 km	MPC · JPL
91370	1999 JQ_{94}	—	May 12, 1999	Socorro	LINEAR	·	2.8 km	MPC · JPL
91371	1999 JY_{94}	—	May 12, 1999	Socorro	LINEAR	·	3.1 km	MPC · JPL
91372	1999 JO_{96}	—	May 12, 1999	Socorro	LINEAR	·	2.2 km	MPC · JPL
91373	1999 JQ_{98}	—	May 12, 1999	Socorro	LINEAR	·	4.3 km	MPC · JPL
91374	1999 JZ_{98}	—	May 12, 1999	Socorro	LINEAR	·	2.8 km	MPC · JPL
91375	1999 JD_{99}	—	May 12, 1999	Socorro	LINEAR	PHO	3.1 km	MPC · JPL
91376	1999 JU_{100}	—	May 12, 1999	Socorro	LINEAR	·	4.3 km	MPC · JPL
91377	1999 JR_{103}	—	May 13, 1999	Socorro	LINEAR	·	2.3 km	MPC · JPL
91378	1999 JE_{104}	—	May 14, 1999	Socorro	LINEAR	MAR	1.9 km	MPC · JPL
91379	1999 JN_{105}	—	May 13, 1999	Socorro	LINEAR	·	2.4 km	MPC · JPL
91380	1999 JW_{105}	—	May 13, 1999	Socorro	LINEAR	·	2.4 km	MPC · JPL
91381	1999 JR_{109}	—	May 13, 1999	Socorro	LINEAR	·	9.7 km	MPC · JPL
91382	1999 JZ_{115}	—	May 13, 1999	Socorro	LINEAR	V	1.5 km	MPC · JPL
91383	1999 JR_{116}	—	May 13, 1999	Socorro	LINEAR	·	1.7 km	MPC · JPL
91384	1999 JT_{119}	—	May 13, 1999	Socorro	LINEAR	·	3.4 km	MPC · JPL
91385	1999 JW_{125}	—	May 13, 1999	Socorro	LINEAR	NYS	1.5 km	MPC · JPL
91386	1999 JL_{127}	—	May 13, 1999	Socorro	LINEAR	·	3.2 km	MPC · JPL
91387	1999 JP_{129}	—	May 12, 1999	Socorro	LINEAR	ADE	5.8 km	MPC · JPL
91388	1999 JM_{132}	—	May 13, 1999	Socorro	LINEAR	PHO	4.6 km	MPC · JPL
91389 Davidsaewert	1999 JN_{137}	Davidsaewert	May 9, 1999	Catalina	CSS	·	2.7 km	MPC · JPL
91390	1999 KL	—	May 16, 1999	Kitt Peak	Spacewatch	(5)	3.0 km	MPC · JPL
91391	1999 KQ_{5}	—	May 16, 1999	Bergisch Gladbach	W. Bickel	·	2.7 km	MPC · JPL
91392	1999 KL_{7}	—	May 18, 1999	Socorro	LINEAR	(194)	4.4 km	MPC · JPL
91393	1999 KV_{7}	—	May 18, 1999	Socorro	LINEAR	·	4.6 km	MPC · JPL
91394	1999 LM	—	June 6, 1999	Prescott	P. G. Comba	·	2.9 km	MPC · JPL
91395 Sakanouenokumo	1999 LM_{1}	Sakanouenokumo	June 5, 1999	Kuma Kogen	A. Nakamura	·	3.6 km	MPC · JPL
91396	1999 LF_{5}	—	June 10, 1999	Socorro	LINEAR	MAR	2.9 km	MPC · JPL
91397	1999 LL_{8}	—	June 8, 1999	Socorro	LINEAR	·	2.4 km	MPC · JPL
91398	1999 LV_{33}	—	June 11, 1999	Catalina	CSS	EUN	2.9 km	MPC · JPL
91399	1999 LO_{35}	—	June 8, 1999	Catalina	CSS	·	6.0 km	MPC · JPL
91400	1999 MW	—	June 23, 1999	Farra d'Isonzo	Farra d'Isonzo	·	3.5 km	MPC · JPL

== 91401–91500 ==
back to top

Designation			Discovery			Properties		Ref
Permanent	Provisional	Named after	Date	Site	Discoverer(s)	Category	Diam.	Ref
91401	1999 MY	—	June 22, 1999	Woomera	F. B. Zoltowski	·	3.0 km	MPC · JPL
91402	1999 NW	—	July 9, 1999	Woomera	F. B. Zoltowski	·	3.8 km	MPC · JPL
91403	1999 NY_{5}	—	July 13, 1999	Socorro	LINEAR	·	3.7 km	MPC · JPL
91404	1999 NT_{6}	—	July 13, 1999	Socorro	LINEAR	·	4.9 km	MPC · JPL
91405	1999 NB_{10}	—	July 13, 1999	Socorro	LINEAR	(194)	4.3 km	MPC · JPL
91406	1999 NA_{11}	—	July 13, 1999	Socorro	LINEAR	EUN	5.5 km	MPC · JPL
91407	1999 NM_{11}	—	July 13, 1999	Socorro	LINEAR	·	4.5 km	MPC · JPL
91408	1999 NP_{11}	—	July 13, 1999	Socorro	LINEAR	EUN	4.5 km	MPC · JPL
91409	1999 NP_{15}	—	July 14, 1999	Socorro	LINEAR	·	3.6 km	MPC · JPL
91410	1999 NZ_{30}	—	July 14, 1999	Socorro	LINEAR	·	6.9 km	MPC · JPL
91411	1999 NJ_{41}	—	July 14, 1999	Socorro	LINEAR	·	4.0 km	MPC · JPL
91412	1999 NP_{42}	—	July 14, 1999	Socorro	LINEAR	·	6.4 km	MPC · JPL
91413	1999 NN_{49}	—	July 13, 1999	Socorro	LINEAR	·	4.9 km	MPC · JPL
91414	1999 ND_{54}	—	July 12, 1999	Socorro	LINEAR	EUN	3.1 km	MPC · JPL
91415	1999 NH_{54}	—	July 12, 1999	Socorro	LINEAR	·	4.4 km	MPC · JPL
91416	1999 NH_{55}	—	July 12, 1999	Socorro	LINEAR	EUN	3.3 km	MPC · JPL
91417	1999 NU_{55}	—	July 12, 1999	Socorro	LINEAR	ADE	7.4 km	MPC · JPL
91418	1999 NY_{56}	—	July 12, 1999	Socorro	LINEAR	·	4.2 km	MPC · JPL
91419	1999 NP_{59}	—	July 13, 1999	Socorro	LINEAR	·	4.3 km	MPC · JPL
91420	1999 NK_{60}	—	July 13, 1999	Socorro	LINEAR	·	4.3 km	MPC · JPL
91421	1999 NA_{65}	—	July 14, 1999	Socorro	LINEAR	·	3.8 km	MPC · JPL
91422 Giraudon	1999 OH	Giraudon	July 16, 1999	Pises	Pises	ADE	8.3 km	MPC · JPL
91423	1999 OT_{4}	—	July 16, 1999	Socorro	LINEAR	·	3.5 km	MPC · JPL
91424	1999 PT_{1}	—	August 10, 1999	Ametlla de Mar	J. Nomen	·	5.7 km	MPC · JPL
91425	1999 PM_{2}	—	August 7, 1999	Kitt Peak	Spacewatch	KOR	3.1 km	MPC · JPL
91426	1999 PE_{4}	—	August 13, 1999	Reedy Creek	J. Broughton	·	3.6 km	MPC · JPL
91427	1999 PB_{5}	—	August 14, 1999	Ondřejov	P. Kušnirák, P. Pravec	·	6.1 km	MPC · JPL
91428 Cortesi	1999 QT_{1}	Cortesi	August 20, 1999	Gnosca	S. Sposetti	·	3.8 km	MPC · JPL
91429 Michelebianda	1999 QO_{2}	Michelebianda	August 30, 1999	Gnosca	S. Sposetti	·	3.4 km	MPC · JPL
91430	1999 RL	—	September 4, 1999	Prescott	P. G. Comba	·	5.3 km	MPC · JPL
91431	1999 RQ	—	September 3, 1999	Ondřejov	L. Kotková	AGN	2.2 km	MPC · JPL
91432	1999 RF_{1}	—	September 4, 1999	Prescott	P. G. Comba	HOF	6.3 km	MPC · JPL
91433	1999 RL_{2}	—	September 4, 1999	Catalina	CSS	·	6.2 km	MPC · JPL
91434	1999 RY_{3}	—	September 4, 1999	Catalina	CSS	·	3.8 km	MPC · JPL
91435	1999 RX_{6}	—	September 3, 1999	Kitt Peak	Spacewatch	EOS	3.7 km	MPC · JPL
91436	1999 RY_{6}	—	September 3, 1999	Kitt Peak	Spacewatch	·	2.9 km	MPC · JPL
91437	1999 RB_{9}	—	September 4, 1999	Kitt Peak	Spacewatch	·	4.2 km	MPC · JPL
91438	1999 RA_{12}	—	September 7, 1999	Socorro	LINEAR	·	2.9 km	MPC · JPL
91439	1999 RD_{12}	—	September 7, 1999	Socorro	LINEAR	·	4.0 km	MPC · JPL
91440	1999 RK_{12}	—	September 7, 1999	Socorro	LINEAR	·	6.0 km	MPC · JPL
91441	1999 RU_{14}	—	September 7, 1999	Socorro	LINEAR	EOS	5.0 km	MPC · JPL
91442	1999 RD_{17}	—	September 7, 1999	Socorro	LINEAR	DOR	4.0 km	MPC · JPL
91443	1999 RH_{17}	—	September 7, 1999	Socorro	LINEAR	·	3.3 km	MPC · JPL
91444	1999 RS_{17}	—	September 7, 1999	Socorro	LINEAR	·	2.6 km	MPC · JPL
91445	1999 RC_{19}	—	September 7, 1999	Socorro	LINEAR	·	4.8 km	MPC · JPL
91446	1999 RD_{19}	—	September 7, 1999	Socorro	LINEAR	·	5.0 km	MPC · JPL
91447	1999 RH_{19}	—	September 7, 1999	Socorro	LINEAR	·	3.6 km	MPC · JPL
91448	1999 RY_{21}	—	September 7, 1999	Socorro	LINEAR	·	3.3 km	MPC · JPL
91449	1999 RQ_{24}	—	September 7, 1999	Socorro	LINEAR	EOS	4.5 km	MPC · JPL
91450	1999 RV_{24}	—	September 7, 1999	Socorro	LINEAR	H	1.5 km	MPC · JPL
91451	1999 RG_{38}	—	September 13, 1999	Višnjan Observatory	K. Korlević	·	3.5 km	MPC · JPL
91452	1999 RL_{43}	—	September 14, 1999	Ondřejov	P. Kušnirák, P. Pravec	EOS	4.0 km	MPC · JPL
91453	1999 RA_{49}	—	September 7, 1999	Socorro	LINEAR	·	4.6 km	MPC · JPL
91454	1999 RK_{49}	—	September 7, 1999	Socorro	LINEAR	EUN	2.8 km	MPC · JPL
91455	1999 RV_{49}	—	September 7, 1999	Socorro	LINEAR	EUN	3.5 km	MPC · JPL
91456	1999 RK_{58}	—	September 7, 1999	Socorro	LINEAR	·	6.6 km	MPC · JPL
91457	1999 RL_{65}	—	September 7, 1999	Socorro	LINEAR	AGN	2.2 km	MPC · JPL
91458	1999 RX_{66}	—	September 7, 1999	Socorro	LINEAR	KOR	3.4 km	MPC · JPL
91459	1999 RE_{69}	—	September 7, 1999	Socorro	LINEAR	·	2.8 km	MPC · JPL
91460	1999 RK_{71}	—	September 7, 1999	Socorro	LINEAR	·	4.0 km	MPC · JPL
91461	1999 RQ_{71}	—	September 7, 1999	Socorro	LINEAR	AGN	2.2 km	MPC · JPL
91462	1999 RL_{72}	—	September 7, 1999	Socorro	LINEAR	·	5.1 km	MPC · JPL
91463	1999 RZ_{75}	—	September 7, 1999	Socorro	LINEAR	EOS	3.4 km	MPC · JPL
91464	1999 RZ_{77}	—	September 7, 1999	Socorro	LINEAR	·	4.5 km	MPC · JPL
91465	1999 RE_{80}	—	September 7, 1999	Socorro	LINEAR	·	3.3 km	MPC · JPL
91466	1999 RU_{81}	—	September 7, 1999	Socorro	LINEAR	DOR	6.6 km	MPC · JPL
91467	1999 RQ_{83}	—	September 7, 1999	Socorro	LINEAR	·	6.4 km	MPC · JPL
91468	1999 RH_{87}	—	September 7, 1999	Socorro	LINEAR	·	4.9 km	MPC · JPL
91469	1999 RW_{87}	—	September 7, 1999	Socorro	LINEAR	KOR	4.5 km	MPC · JPL
91470	1999 RX_{87}	—	September 7, 1999	Socorro	LINEAR	HOF	6.8 km	MPC · JPL
91471	1999 RJ_{89}	—	September 7, 1999	Socorro	LINEAR	EOS	4.8 km	MPC · JPL
91472	1999 RY_{91}	—	September 7, 1999	Socorro	LINEAR	·	4.2 km	MPC · JPL
91473	1999 RJ_{95}	—	September 7, 1999	Socorro	LINEAR	·	4.8 km	MPC · JPL
91474	1999 RO_{95}	—	September 7, 1999	Socorro	LINEAR	·	5.4 km	MPC · JPL
91475	1999 RH_{96}	—	September 7, 1999	Socorro	LINEAR	·	4.7 km	MPC · JPL
91476	1999 RA_{97}	—	September 7, 1999	Socorro	LINEAR	·	4.3 km	MPC · JPL
91477	1999 RJ_{97}	—	September 7, 1999	Socorro	LINEAR	·	4.2 km	MPC · JPL
91478	1999 RO_{99}	—	September 8, 1999	Socorro	LINEAR	·	2.7 km	MPC · JPL
91479	1999 RL_{107}	—	September 8, 1999	Socorro	LINEAR	VER	8.2 km	MPC · JPL
91480	1999 RP_{107}	—	September 8, 1999	Socorro	LINEAR	·	8.3 km	MPC · JPL
91481	1999 RV_{108}	—	September 8, 1999	Socorro	LINEAR	·	3.6 km	MPC · JPL
91482	1999 RP_{110}	—	September 8, 1999	Socorro	LINEAR	EOS	4.9 km	MPC · JPL
91483	1999 RS_{110}	—	September 8, 1999	Socorro	LINEAR	·	6.7 km	MPC · JPL
91484	1999 RL_{112}	—	September 9, 1999	Socorro	LINEAR	·	3.8 km	MPC · JPL
91485	1999 RF_{115}	—	September 9, 1999	Socorro	LINEAR	·	3.9 km	MPC · JPL
91486	1999 RS_{117}	—	September 9, 1999	Socorro	LINEAR	·	4.5 km	MPC · JPL
91487	1999 RT_{117}	—	September 9, 1999	Socorro	LINEAR	MAR	5.3 km	MPC · JPL
91488	1999 RL_{119}	—	September 9, 1999	Socorro	LINEAR	·	6.5 km	MPC · JPL
91489	1999 RL_{121}	—	September 9, 1999	Socorro	LINEAR	EOS	2.9 km	MPC · JPL
91490	1999 RX_{123}	—	September 9, 1999	Socorro	LINEAR	·	3.7 km	MPC · JPL
91491	1999 RA_{124}	—	September 9, 1999	Socorro	LINEAR	·	5.3 km	MPC · JPL
91492	1999 RY_{132}	—	September 9, 1999	Socorro	LINEAR	GEF	3.4 km	MPC · JPL
91493	1999 RE_{134}	—	September 9, 1999	Socorro	LINEAR	·	4.1 km	MPC · JPL
91494	1999 RS_{135}	—	September 9, 1999	Socorro	LINEAR	·	4.5 km	MPC · JPL
91495	1999 RZ_{138}	—	September 9, 1999	Socorro	LINEAR	slow	5.0 km	MPC · JPL
91496	1999 RT_{141}	—	September 9, 1999	Socorro	LINEAR	·	3.8 km	MPC · JPL
91497	1999 RF_{142}	—	September 9, 1999	Socorro	LINEAR	·	3.9 km	MPC · JPL
91498	1999 RG_{142}	—	September 9, 1999	Socorro	LINEAR	KOR	3.5 km	MPC · JPL
91499	1999 RX_{144}	—	September 9, 1999	Socorro	LINEAR	CLO	5.5 km	MPC · JPL
91500	1999 RA_{147}	—	September 9, 1999	Socorro	LINEAR	·	4.3 km	MPC · JPL

== 91501–91600 ==
back to top

Designation			Discovery			Properties		Ref
Permanent	Provisional	Named after	Date	Site	Discoverer(s)	Category	Diam.	Ref
91501	1999 RW_{147}	—	September 9, 1999	Socorro	LINEAR	DOR	4.6 km	MPC · JPL
91502	1999 RP_{150}	—	September 9, 1999	Socorro	LINEAR	EUN	3.9 km	MPC · JPL
91503	1999 RR_{150}	—	September 9, 1999	Socorro	LINEAR	·	5.8 km	MPC · JPL
91504	1999 RZ_{153}	—	September 9, 1999	Socorro	LINEAR	·	4.5 km	MPC · JPL
91505	1999 RA_{158}	—	September 9, 1999	Socorro	LINEAR	EUN	4.6 km	MPC · JPL
91506	1999 RC_{160}	—	September 9, 1999	Socorro	LINEAR	·	4.3 km	MPC · JPL
91507	1999 RM_{160}	—	September 9, 1999	Socorro	LINEAR	·	7.4 km	MPC · JPL
91508	1999 RZ_{160}	—	September 9, 1999	Socorro	LINEAR	KOR	2.8 km	MPC · JPL
91509	1999 RY_{161}	—	September 9, 1999	Socorro	LINEAR	·	3.7 km	MPC · JPL
91510	1999 RA_{162}	—	September 9, 1999	Socorro	LINEAR	·	4.5 km	MPC · JPL
91511	1999 RJ_{163}	—	September 9, 1999	Socorro	LINEAR	EOS	5.4 km	MPC · JPL
91512	1999 RL_{165}	—	September 9, 1999	Socorro	LINEAR	·	3.4 km	MPC · JPL
91513	1999 RG_{166}	—	September 9, 1999	Socorro	LINEAR	·	2.8 km	MPC · JPL
91514	1999 RJ_{166}	—	September 9, 1999	Socorro	LINEAR	KOR	3.6 km	MPC · JPL
91515	1999 RR_{169}	—	September 9, 1999	Socorro	LINEAR	HOF	6.7 km	MPC · JPL
91516	1999 RD_{174}	—	September 9, 1999	Socorro	LINEAR	·	4.8 km	MPC · JPL
91517	1999 RO_{175}	—	September 9, 1999	Socorro	LINEAR	·	4.2 km	MPC · JPL
91518	1999 RJ_{177}	—	September 9, 1999	Socorro	LINEAR	·	4.7 km	MPC · JPL
91519	1999 RT_{180}	—	September 9, 1999	Socorro	LINEAR	·	3.9 km	MPC · JPL
91520	1999 RK_{183}	—	September 9, 1999	Socorro	LINEAR	KOR	4.5 km	MPC · JPL
91521	1999 RY_{183}	—	September 9, 1999	Socorro	LINEAR	·	4.6 km	MPC · JPL
91522	1999 RJ_{185}	—	September 9, 1999	Socorro	LINEAR	HNS	4.0 km	MPC · JPL
91523	1999 RM_{185}	—	September 9, 1999	Socorro	LINEAR	·	3.4 km	MPC · JPL
91524	1999 RN_{187}	—	September 9, 1999	Socorro	LINEAR	PAD	6.9 km	MPC · JPL
91525	1999 RA_{189}	—	September 9, 1999	Socorro	LINEAR	EOS	3.8 km	MPC · JPL
91526	1999 RF_{189}	—	September 9, 1999	Socorro	LINEAR	·	3.1 km	MPC · JPL
91527	1999 RT_{189}	—	September 9, 1999	Socorro	LINEAR	·	4.5 km	MPC · JPL
91528	1999 RV_{191}	—	September 11, 1999	Socorro	LINEAR	GAL	4.3 km	MPC · JPL
91529	1999 RL_{193}	—	September 13, 1999	Farpoint	G. Hug, G. Bell	·	3.1 km	MPC · JPL
91530	1999 RG_{194}	—	September 7, 1999	Socorro	LINEAR	·	6.1 km	MPC · JPL
91531	1999 RH_{195}	—	September 8, 1999	Socorro	LINEAR	·	4.8 km	MPC · JPL
91532	1999 RC_{196}	—	September 8, 1999	Socorro	LINEAR	·	6.0 km	MPC · JPL
91533	1999 RY_{199}	—	September 8, 1999	Socorro	LINEAR	MAR	5.0 km	MPC · JPL
91534	1999 RC_{200}	—	September 8, 1999	Socorro	LINEAR	·	4.9 km	MPC · JPL
91535	1999 RD_{200}	—	September 8, 1999	Socorro	LINEAR	EUN	4.1 km	MPC · JPL
91536	1999 RK_{201}	—	September 8, 1999	Socorro	LINEAR	EOS	8.3 km	MPC · JPL
91537	1999 RG_{203}	—	September 8, 1999	Socorro	LINEAR	EOS	5.5 km	MPC · JPL
91538	1999 RA_{204}	—	September 8, 1999	Socorro	LINEAR	·	10 km	MPC · JPL
91539	1999 RP_{204}	—	September 8, 1999	Socorro	LINEAR	EOS	4.5 km	MPC · JPL
91540	1999 RH_{205}	—	September 8, 1999	Socorro	LINEAR	·	5.0 km	MPC · JPL
91541	1999 RG_{206}	—	September 8, 1999	Socorro	LINEAR	GEF	2.8 km	MPC · JPL
91542	1999 RC_{207}	—	September 8, 1999	Socorro	LINEAR	·	8.1 km	MPC · JPL
91543	1999 RJ_{207}	—	September 8, 1999	Socorro	LINEAR	EOS	5.1 km	MPC · JPL
91544	1999 RM_{207}	—	September 8, 1999	Socorro	LINEAR	·	3.9 km	MPC · JPL
91545	1999 RT_{209}	—	September 8, 1999	Socorro	LINEAR	EOS	6.0 km	MPC · JPL
91546	1999 RV_{209}	—	September 8, 1999	Socorro	LINEAR	EOS	5.0 km	MPC · JPL
91547	1999 RZ_{209}	—	September 8, 1999	Socorro	LINEAR	EOS	4.8 km	MPC · JPL
91548	1999 RN_{210}	—	September 8, 1999	Socorro	LINEAR	·	3.6 km	MPC · JPL
91549	1999 RU_{210}	—	September 8, 1999	Socorro	LINEAR	·	8.4 km	MPC · JPL
91550	1999 RW_{210}	—	September 8, 1999	Socorro	LINEAR	·	7.7 km	MPC · JPL
91551	1999 RA_{212}	—	September 8, 1999	Socorro	LINEAR	·	10 km	MPC · JPL
91552	1999 RG_{213}	—	September 8, 1999	Bergisch Gladbach	W. Bickel	·	2.8 km	MPC · JPL
91553 Claudedoom	1999 RD_{214}	Claudedoom	September 8, 1999	Observatoire Royal de Belgique, Uccle	T. Pauwels	KOR	2.2 km	MPC · JPL
91554	1999 RZ_{215}	—	September 8, 1999	Mauna Kea	J. X. Luu, C. A. Trujillo, D. C. Jewitt	SDO	120 km	MPC · JPL
91555	1999 RE_{219}	—	September 5, 1999	Kitt Peak	Spacewatch	KOR	3.0 km	MPC · JPL
91556	1999 RT_{220}	—	September 5, 1999	Catalina	CSS	·	5.5 km	MPC · JPL
91557	1999 RW_{222}	—	September 7, 1999	Catalina	CSS	GEF	2.7 km	MPC · JPL
91558	1999 RL_{226}	—	September 4, 1999	Catalina	CSS	·	4.1 km	MPC · JPL
91559	1999 RM_{226}	—	September 4, 1999	Kitt Peak	Spacewatch	·	2.2 km	MPC · JPL
91560	1999 RW_{226}	—	September 5, 1999	Catalina	CSS	·	3.7 km	MPC · JPL
91561	1999 RK_{230}	—	September 8, 1999	Catalina	CSS	·	4.4 km	MPC · JPL
91562	1999 RM_{231}	—	September 9, 1999	Anderson Mesa	LONEOS	EUN	4.0 km	MPC · JPL
91563	1999 RJ_{235}	—	September 8, 1999	Catalina	CSS	EMA	5.6 km	MPC · JPL
91564	1999 RN_{235}	—	September 8, 1999	Socorro	LINEAR	KOR	3.5 km	MPC · JPL
91565	1999 RK_{237}	—	September 8, 1999	Catalina	CSS	EOS	4.4 km	MPC · JPL
91566	1999 RQ_{237}	—	September 8, 1999	Catalina	CSS	EOS	4.6 km	MPC · JPL
91567	1999 RU_{239}	—	September 8, 1999	Anderson Mesa	LONEOS	·	5.3 km	MPC · JPL
91568	1999 RD_{241}	—	September 11, 1999	Anderson Mesa	LONEOS	LIX	8.4 km	MPC · JPL
91569	1999 RX_{248}	—	September 7, 1999	Socorro	LINEAR	GEF	3.2 km	MPC · JPL
91570	1999 RN_{249}	—	September 8, 1999	Socorro	LINEAR	EOS	4.1 km	MPC · JPL
91571	1999 RZ_{252}	—	September 8, 1999	Socorro	LINEAR	EOS	3.6 km	MPC · JPL
91572	1999 RF_{253}	—	September 8, 1999	Socorro	LINEAR	·	5.5 km	MPC · JPL
91573	1999 SN_{2}	—	September 16, 1999	Observatoire Royal de Belgique, Uccle	T. Pauwels, Ipatov, S. I.	·	2.3 km	MPC · JPL
91574	1999 SV_{2}	—	September 22, 1999	Ondřejov	L. Kotková	EOS	4.4 km	MPC · JPL
91575	1999 SS_{6}	—	September 30, 1999	Socorro	LINEAR	EOS	5.2 km	MPC · JPL
91576	1999 SL_{7}	—	September 29, 1999	Socorro	LINEAR	·	5.7 km	MPC · JPL
91577	1999 SU_{8}	—	September 29, 1999	Socorro	LINEAR	·	6.0 km	MPC · JPL
91578	1999 SK_{14}	—	September 30, 1999	Catalina	CSS	KOR	2.9 km	MPC · JPL
91579	1999 SQ_{15}	—	September 30, 1999	Catalina	CSS	EOS	4.8 km	MPC · JPL
91580	1999 SS_{15}	—	September 30, 1999	Catalina	CSS	EOS	3.8 km	MPC · JPL
91581	1999 SW_{15}	—	September 30, 1999	Catalina	CSS	EOS	6.0 km	MPC · JPL
91582	1999 SF_{19}	—	September 30, 1999	Socorro	LINEAR	·	4.0 km	MPC · JPL
91583	1999 SK_{20}	—	September 30, 1999	Socorro	LINEAR	·	4.5 km	MPC · JPL
91584	1999 SQ_{20}	—	September 30, 1999	Socorro	LINEAR	·	5.4 km	MPC · JPL
91585	1999 SR_{20}	—	September 30, 1999	Socorro	LINEAR	GEF	3.1 km	MPC · JPL
91586	1999 SS_{23}	—	September 30, 1999	Kitt Peak	Spacewatch	·	3.3 km	MPC · JPL
91587	1999 SD_{24}	—	September 29, 1999	Catalina	CSS	EOS	4.1 km	MPC · JPL
91588	1999 TJ	—	October 2, 1999	Prescott	P. G. Comba	·	3.0 km	MPC · JPL
91589	1999 TF_{1}	—	October 1, 1999	Višnjan Observatory	K. Korlević	·	5.2 km	MPC · JPL
91590	1999 TA_{3}	—	October 3, 1999	Fountain Hills	C. W. Juels	EOS	7.4 km	MPC · JPL
91591	1999 TJ_{3}	—	October 4, 1999	Prescott	P. G. Comba	·	5.0 km	MPC · JPL
91592	1999 TU_{3}	—	October 2, 1999	Ondřejov	L. Kotková	EOS	6.0 km	MPC · JPL
91593	1999 TF_{7}	—	October 6, 1999	Višnjan Observatory	K. Korlević, M. Jurić	·	5.5 km	MPC · JPL
91594	1999 TN_{8}	—	October 6, 1999	Višnjan Observatory	K. Korlević, M. Jurić	·	4.6 km	MPC · JPL
91595	1999 TZ_{9}	—	October 9, 1999	Prescott	P. G. Comba	·	2.3 km	MPC · JPL
91596	1999 TF_{11}	—	October 9, 1999	Fountain Hills	C. W. Juels	·	4.1 km	MPC · JPL
91597	1999 TB_{13}	—	October 10, 1999	Oizumi	T. Kobayashi	·	5.6 km	MPC · JPL
91598	1999 TK_{13}	—	October 11, 1999	Lime Creek	R. Linderholm	·	7.2 km	MPC · JPL
91599	1999 TQ_{13}	—	October 10, 1999	Črni Vrh	Mikuž, H.	slow	7.5 km	MPC · JPL
91600	1999 TN_{16}	—	October 13, 1999	Ondřejov	P. Pravec, P. Kušnirák	·	3.2 km	MPC · JPL

== 91601–91700 ==
back to top

Designation			Discovery			Properties		Ref
Permanent	Provisional	Named after	Date	Site	Discoverer(s)	Category	Diam.	Ref
91601	1999 TA_{17}	—	October 10, 1999	Višnjan Observatory	K. Korlević	·	3.5 km	MPC · JPL
91602	1999 TM_{17}	—	October 13, 1999	Modra	A. Galád, P. Kolény	EOS	7.5 km	MPC · JPL
91603	1999 TA_{19}	—	October 15, 1999	Višnjan Observatory	K. Korlević	·	8.2 km	MPC · JPL
91604 Clausmadsen	1999 TN_{19}	Clausmadsen	October 14, 1999	Uccle	T. Pauwels, H. M. J. Boffin	EOS	4.6 km	MPC · JPL
91605	1999 TC_{20}	—	October 15, 1999	Xinglong	SCAP	·	7.9 km	MPC · JPL
91606	1999 TE_{20}	—	October 15, 1999	Xinglong	SCAP	EOS	3.7 km	MPC · JPL
91607 Delaboudinière	1999 TP_{20}	Delaboudinière	October 5, 1999	Goodricke-Pigott	R. A. Tucker	·	3.7 km	MPC · JPL
91608	1999 TW_{21}	—	October 3, 1999	Kitt Peak	Spacewatch	·	5.4 km	MPC · JPL
91609	1999 TX_{21}	—	October 3, 1999	Kitt Peak	Spacewatch	·	4.8 km	MPC · JPL
91610	1999 TP_{26}	—	October 3, 1999	Socorro	LINEAR	EOS	4.9 km	MPC · JPL
91611	1999 TN_{27}	—	October 3, 1999	Socorro	LINEAR	HYG	7.8 km	MPC · JPL
91612	1999 TJ_{30}	—	October 4, 1999	Socorro	LINEAR	EMA	5.6 km	MPC · JPL
91613	1999 TO_{31}	—	October 4, 1999	Socorro	LINEAR	·	11 km	MPC · JPL
91614	1999 TF_{32}	—	October 4, 1999	Socorro	LINEAR	·	5.1 km	MPC · JPL
91615	1999 TZ_{32}	—	October 4, 1999	Socorro	LINEAR	·	4.9 km	MPC · JPL
91616	1999 TR_{33}	—	October 4, 1999	Socorro	LINEAR	·	3.5 km	MPC · JPL
91617	1999 TW_{36}	—	October 15, 1999	Anderson Mesa	LONEOS	·	13 km	MPC · JPL
91618	1999 TB_{38}	—	October 1, 1999	Catalina	CSS	·	5.6 km	MPC · JPL
91619	1999 TJ_{38}	—	October 1, 1999	Catalina	CSS	·	4.4 km	MPC · JPL
91620	1999 TA_{39}	—	October 3, 1999	Catalina	CSS	·	5.2 km	MPC · JPL
91621	1999 TK_{39}	—	October 3, 1999	Catalina	CSS	·	4.1 km	MPC · JPL
91622	1999 TJ_{40}	—	October 5, 1999	Catalina	CSS	AGN	2.9 km	MPC · JPL
91623	1999 TL_{41}	—	October 2, 1999	Kitt Peak	Spacewatch	THM	3.1 km	MPC · JPL
91624	1999 TP_{44}	—	October 3, 1999	Kitt Peak	Spacewatch	·	8.1 km	MPC · JPL
91625	1999 TS_{53}	—	October 6, 1999	Kitt Peak	Spacewatch	ANF	3.3 km	MPC · JPL
91626	1999 TJ_{55}	—	October 6, 1999	Kitt Peak	Spacewatch	·	4.6 km	MPC · JPL
91627	1999 TW_{55}	—	October 6, 1999	Kitt Peak	Spacewatch	·	7.9 km	MPC · JPL
91628	1999 TC_{58}	—	October 6, 1999	Kitt Peak	Spacewatch	·	8.4 km	MPC · JPL
91629	1999 TR_{58}	—	October 6, 1999	Kitt Peak	Spacewatch	·	3.0 km	MPC · JPL
91630	1999 TQ_{59}	—	October 7, 1999	Kitt Peak	Spacewatch	EOS	2.8 km	MPC · JPL
91631	1999 TF_{65}	—	October 8, 1999	Kitt Peak	Spacewatch	·	3.5 km	MPC · JPL
91632	1999 TB_{68}	—	October 8, 1999	Kitt Peak	Spacewatch	THM	7.8 km	MPC · JPL
91633	1999 TM_{71}	—	October 9, 1999	Kitt Peak	Spacewatch	·	7.1 km	MPC · JPL
91634	1999 TJ_{75}	—	October 10, 1999	Kitt Peak	Spacewatch	·	4.2 km	MPC · JPL
91635	1999 TH_{79}	—	October 11, 1999	Kitt Peak	Spacewatch	·	5.7 km	MPC · JPL
91636	1999 TY_{79}	—	October 11, 1999	Kitt Peak	Spacewatch	EOS	3.5 km	MPC · JPL
91637	1999 TJ_{81}	—	October 12, 1999	Kitt Peak	Spacewatch	EOS	3.2 km	MPC · JPL
91638	1999 TQ_{82}	—	October 12, 1999	Kitt Peak	Spacewatch	·	5.0 km	MPC · JPL
91639	1999 TE_{85}	—	October 14, 1999	Kitt Peak	Spacewatch	·	3.7 km	MPC · JPL
91640	1999 TA_{87}	—	October 15, 1999	Kitt Peak	Spacewatch	·	4.4 km	MPC · JPL
91641	1999 TS_{90}	—	October 2, 1999	Socorro	LINEAR	·	11 km	MPC · JPL
91642	1999 TE_{91}	—	October 2, 1999	Socorro	LINEAR	·	9.3 km	MPC · JPL
91643	1999 TX_{91}	—	October 2, 1999	Socorro	LINEAR	EOS	6.5 km	MPC · JPL
91644	1999 TP_{92}	—	October 2, 1999	Socorro	LINEAR	KOR	3.3 km	MPC · JPL
91645	1999 TE_{93}	—	October 2, 1999	Socorro	LINEAR	·	4.1 km	MPC · JPL
91646	1999 TB_{95}	—	October 2, 1999	Socorro	LINEAR	·	2.2 km	MPC · JPL
91647	1999 TG_{96}	—	October 2, 1999	Socorro	LINEAR	·	8.3 km	MPC · JPL
91648	1999 TE_{97}	—	October 2, 1999	Socorro	LINEAR	·	4.3 km	MPC · JPL
91649	1999 TE_{99}	—	October 2, 1999	Socorro	LINEAR	·	5.5 km	MPC · JPL
91650	1999 TR_{100}	—	October 2, 1999	Socorro	LINEAR	·	5.8 km	MPC · JPL
91651	1999 TU_{100}	—	October 2, 1999	Socorro	LINEAR	·	9.1 km	MPC · JPL
91652	1999 TZ_{100}	—	October 2, 1999	Socorro	LINEAR	URS	18 km	MPC · JPL
91653	1999 TG_{101}	—	October 2, 1999	Socorro	LINEAR	EOS	4.7 km	MPC · JPL
91654	1999 TJ_{101}	—	October 2, 1999	Socorro	LINEAR	EOS	5.3 km	MPC · JPL
91655	1999 TJ_{103}	—	October 3, 1999	Socorro	LINEAR	·	4.0 km	MPC · JPL
91656	1999 TS_{103}	—	October 3, 1999	Socorro	LINEAR	EOS	5.6 km	MPC · JPL
91657	1999 TN_{104}	—	October 3, 1999	Socorro	LINEAR	·	5.6 km	MPC · JPL
91658	1999 TX_{104}	—	October 3, 1999	Socorro	LINEAR	·	5.2 km	MPC · JPL
91659	1999 TP_{105}	—	October 3, 1999	Socorro	LINEAR	·	5.3 km	MPC · JPL
91660	1999 TY_{105}	—	October 3, 1999	Socorro	LINEAR	·	5.6 km	MPC · JPL
91661	1999 TG_{106}	—	October 4, 1999	Socorro	LINEAR	·	4.1 km	MPC · JPL
91662	1999 TL_{106}	—	October 4, 1999	Socorro	LINEAR	·	4.9 km	MPC · JPL
91663	1999 TO_{107}	—	October 4, 1999	Socorro	LINEAR	·	5.4 km	MPC · JPL
91664	1999 TP_{107}	—	October 4, 1999	Socorro	LINEAR	DOR	6.4 km	MPC · JPL
91665	1999 TC_{109}	—	October 4, 1999	Socorro	LINEAR	·	7.2 km	MPC · JPL
91666	1999 TF_{111}	—	October 4, 1999	Socorro	LINEAR	·	3.4 km	MPC · JPL
91667	1999 TU_{111}	—	October 4, 1999	Socorro	LINEAR	EOS	4.8 km	MPC · JPL
91668	1999 TD_{112}	—	October 4, 1999	Socorro	LINEAR	EOS	5.1 km	MPC · JPL
91669	1999 TL_{112}	—	October 4, 1999	Socorro	LINEAR	·	8.8 km	MPC · JPL
91670	1999 TM_{112}	—	October 4, 1999	Socorro	LINEAR	(13314)	5.8 km	MPC · JPL
91671	1999 TL_{114}	—	October 4, 1999	Socorro	LINEAR	KOR	3.0 km	MPC · JPL
91672	1999 TV_{114}	—	October 4, 1999	Socorro	LINEAR	·	4.3 km	MPC · JPL
91673	1999 TY_{114}	—	October 4, 1999	Socorro	LINEAR	·	5.4 km	MPC · JPL
91674	1999 TZ_{114}	—	October 4, 1999	Socorro	LINEAR	NAE	6.3 km	MPC · JPL
91675	1999 TA_{115}	—	October 4, 1999	Socorro	LINEAR	EOS	5.4 km	MPC · JPL
91676	1999 TM_{115}	—	October 4, 1999	Socorro	LINEAR	·	4.1 km	MPC · JPL
91677	1999 TU_{115}	—	October 4, 1999	Socorro	LINEAR	EOS	4.5 km	MPC · JPL
91678	1999 TB_{117}	—	October 4, 1999	Socorro	LINEAR	·	8.3 km	MPC · JPL
91679	1999 TM_{119}	—	October 4, 1999	Socorro	LINEAR	·	4.6 km	MPC · JPL
91680	1999 TX_{119}	—	October 4, 1999	Socorro	LINEAR	·	4.3 km	MPC · JPL
91681	1999 TF_{120}	—	October 4, 1999	Socorro	LINEAR	·	7.3 km	MPC · JPL
91682	1999 TV_{123}	—	October 4, 1999	Socorro	LINEAR	·	5.7 km	MPC · JPL
91683	1999 TZ_{123}	—	October 4, 1999	Socorro	LINEAR	TEL	3.2 km	MPC · JPL
91684	1999 TN_{126}	—	October 4, 1999	Socorro	LINEAR	·	3.9 km	MPC · JPL
91685	1999 TT_{126}	—	October 4, 1999	Socorro	LINEAR	·	5.0 km	MPC · JPL
91686	1999 TU_{126}	—	October 4, 1999	Socorro	LINEAR	·	4.6 km	MPC · JPL
91687	1999 TA_{127}	—	October 4, 1999	Socorro	LINEAR	·	4.4 km	MPC · JPL
91688	1999 TH_{127}	—	October 4, 1999	Socorro	LINEAR	KOR	3.0 km	MPC · JPL
91689	1999 TJ_{127}	—	October 4, 1999	Socorro	LINEAR	·	5.2 km	MPC · JPL
91690	1999 TV_{127}	—	October 15, 1999	Socorro	LINEAR	THM	4.7 km	MPC · JPL
91691	1999 TG_{129}	—	October 6, 1999	Socorro	LINEAR	·	4.2 km	MPC · JPL
91692	1999 TZ_{129}	—	October 6, 1999	Socorro	LINEAR	·	6.2 km	MPC · JPL
91693	1999 TN_{130}	—	October 6, 1999	Socorro	LINEAR	EOS	4.6 km	MPC · JPL
91694	1999 TH_{132}	—	October 6, 1999	Socorro	LINEAR	KOR	2.8 km	MPC · JPL
91695	1999 TL_{136}	—	October 6, 1999	Socorro	LINEAR	HYG	6.3 km	MPC · JPL
91696	1999 TO_{136}	—	October 6, 1999	Socorro	LINEAR	·	4.8 km	MPC · JPL
91697	1999 TO_{137}	—	October 6, 1999	Socorro	LINEAR	·	6.6 km	MPC · JPL
91698	1999 TK_{138}	—	October 6, 1999	Socorro	LINEAR	KOR	3.7 km	MPC · JPL
91699	1999 TU_{138}	—	October 6, 1999	Socorro	LINEAR	·	3.6 km	MPC · JPL
91700	1999 TY_{139}	—	October 6, 1999	Socorro	LINEAR	·	3.5 km	MPC · JPL

== 91701–91800 ==
back to top

Designation			Discovery			Properties		Ref
Permanent	Provisional	Named after	Date	Site	Discoverer(s)	Category	Diam.	Ref
91701	1999 TS_{142}	—	October 7, 1999	Socorro	LINEAR	·	3.6 km	MPC · JPL
91702	1999 TX_{142}	—	October 7, 1999	Socorro	LINEAR	·	5.0 km	MPC · JPL
91703	1999 TS_{143}	—	October 7, 1999	Socorro	LINEAR	TIR	3.1 km	MPC · JPL
91704	1999 TQ_{145}	—	October 7, 1999	Socorro	LINEAR	KOR	5.0 km	MPC · JPL
91705	1999 TR_{145}	—	October 7, 1999	Socorro	LINEAR	HYG	6.1 km	MPC · JPL
91706	1999 TV_{145}	—	October 7, 1999	Socorro	LINEAR	KOR	3.1 km	MPC · JPL
91707	1999 TH_{146}	—	October 7, 1999	Socorro	LINEAR	·	3.7 km	MPC · JPL
91708	1999 TF_{147}	—	October 7, 1999	Socorro	LINEAR	KOR	4.1 km	MPC · JPL
91709	1999 TG_{148}	—	October 7, 1999	Socorro	LINEAR	·	4.3 km	MPC · JPL
91710	1999 TZ_{149}	—	October 7, 1999	Socorro	LINEAR	·	7.6 km	MPC · JPL
91711	1999 TP_{150}	—	October 7, 1999	Socorro	LINEAR	·	9.0 km	MPC · JPL
91712	1999 TW_{150}	—	October 7, 1999	Socorro	LINEAR	·	6.2 km	MPC · JPL
91713	1999 TD_{152}	—	October 7, 1999	Socorro	LINEAR	·	3.7 km	MPC · JPL
91714	1999 TW_{153}	—	October 7, 1999	Socorro	LINEAR	·	7.7 km	MPC · JPL
91715	1999 TA_{154}	—	October 7, 1999	Socorro	LINEAR	·	5.6 km	MPC · JPL
91716	1999 TG_{154}	—	October 7, 1999	Socorro	LINEAR	·	4.6 km	MPC · JPL
91717	1999 TL_{155}	—	October 7, 1999	Socorro	LINEAR	·	7.2 km	MPC · JPL
91718	1999 TX_{155}	—	October 7, 1999	Socorro	LINEAR	·	5.9 km	MPC · JPL
91719	1999 TD_{156}	—	October 7, 1999	Socorro	LINEAR	·	7.8 km	MPC · JPL
91720	1999 TJ_{156}	—	October 7, 1999	Socorro	LINEAR	HYG	8.8 km	MPC · JPL
91721	1999 TQ_{157}	—	October 9, 1999	Socorro	LINEAR	·	9.0 km	MPC · JPL
91722	1999 TW_{157}	—	October 9, 1999	Socorro	LINEAR	EOS	5.3 km	MPC · JPL
91723	1999 TD_{158}	—	October 7, 1999	Socorro	LINEAR	·	5.9 km	MPC · JPL
91724	1999 TK_{158}	—	October 7, 1999	Socorro	LINEAR	EUP	9.5 km	MPC · JPL
91725	1999 TM_{158}	—	October 8, 1999	Socorro	LINEAR	MAR	2.6 km	MPC · JPL
91726	1999 TE_{159}	—	October 9, 1999	Socorro	LINEAR	·	6.4 km	MPC · JPL
91727	1999 TH_{162}	—	October 9, 1999	Socorro	LINEAR	·	3.7 km	MPC · JPL
91728	1999 TM_{162}	—	October 9, 1999	Socorro	LINEAR	EOS ·	7.9 km	MPC · JPL
91729	1999 TG_{163}	—	October 9, 1999	Socorro	LINEAR	EOS	3.6 km	MPC · JPL
91730	1999 TP_{163}	—	October 9, 1999	Socorro	LINEAR	·	5.2 km	MPC · JPL
91731	1999 TJ_{164}	—	October 10, 1999	Socorro	LINEAR	·	6.5 km	MPC · JPL
91732	1999 TK_{164}	—	October 10, 1999	Socorro	LINEAR	·	3.3 km	MPC · JPL
91733	1999 TO_{164}	—	October 10, 1999	Socorro	LINEAR	·	5.3 km	MPC · JPL
91734	1999 TM_{166}	—	October 10, 1999	Socorro	LINEAR	EOS	5.8 km	MPC · JPL
91735	1999 TM_{171}	—	October 10, 1999	Socorro	LINEAR	·	2.7 km	MPC · JPL
91736	1999 TN_{172}	—	October 10, 1999	Socorro	LINEAR	·	6.2 km	MPC · JPL
91737	1999 TW_{172}	—	October 10, 1999	Socorro	LINEAR	VER	6.2 km	MPC · JPL
91738	1999 TE_{174}	—	October 10, 1999	Socorro	LINEAR	CYB	12 km	MPC · JPL
91739	1999 TA_{175}	—	October 10, 1999	Socorro	LINEAR	·	6.5 km	MPC · JPL
91740	1999 TX_{177}	—	October 10, 1999	Socorro	LINEAR	·	5.3 km	MPC · JPL
91741	1999 TL_{178}	—	October 10, 1999	Socorro	LINEAR	·	3.2 km	MPC · JPL
91742	1999 TE_{179}	—	October 10, 1999	Socorro	LINEAR	·	4.7 km	MPC · JPL
91743	1999 TA_{180}	—	October 10, 1999	Socorro	LINEAR	·	3.1 km	MPC · JPL
91744	1999 TD_{183}	—	October 11, 1999	Socorro	LINEAR	·	4.4 km	MPC · JPL
91745	1999 TF_{184}	—	October 12, 1999	Socorro	LINEAR	·	10 km	MPC · JPL
91746	1999 TL_{185}	—	October 12, 1999	Socorro	LINEAR	·	7.9 km	MPC · JPL
91747	1999 TT_{185}	—	October 12, 1999	Socorro	LINEAR	·	8.4 km	MPC · JPL
91748	1999 TA_{186}	—	October 12, 1999	Socorro	LINEAR	·	9.3 km	MPC · JPL
91749	1999 TV_{186}	—	October 12, 1999	Socorro	LINEAR	·	4.4 km	MPC · JPL
91750	1999 TR_{187}	—	October 12, 1999	Socorro	LINEAR	·	3.3 km	MPC · JPL
91751	1999 TX_{188}	—	October 12, 1999	Socorro	LINEAR	·	4.1 km	MPC · JPL
91752	1999 TB_{189}	—	October 12, 1999	Socorro	LINEAR	·	5.1 km	MPC · JPL
91753	1999 TN_{189}	—	October 12, 1999	Socorro	LINEAR	EOS ·	8.2 km	MPC · JPL
91754	1999 TO_{189}	—	October 12, 1999	Socorro	LINEAR	·	5.0 km	MPC · JPL
91755	1999 TQ_{189}	—	October 12, 1999	Socorro	LINEAR	EOS	3.1 km	MPC · JPL
91756	1999 TT_{189}	—	October 12, 1999	Socorro	LINEAR	EOS	4.9 km	MPC · JPL
91757	1999 TN_{190}	—	October 12, 1999	Socorro	LINEAR	·	3.0 km	MPC · JPL
91758	1999 TR_{190}	—	October 12, 1999	Socorro	LINEAR	·	5.2 km	MPC · JPL
91759	1999 TU_{191}	—	October 12, 1999	Socorro	LINEAR	·	5.6 km	MPC · JPL
91760	1999 TX_{191}	—	October 12, 1999	Socorro	LINEAR	EOS	4.0 km	MPC · JPL
91761	1999 TZ_{191}	—	October 12, 1999	Socorro	LINEAR	EOS	4.2 km	MPC · JPL
91762	1999 TH_{192}	—	October 12, 1999	Socorro	LINEAR	·	5.6 km	MPC · JPL
91763	1999 TN_{192}	—	October 12, 1999	Socorro	LINEAR	·	6.9 km	MPC · JPL
91764	1999 TV_{193}	—	October 12, 1999	Socorro	LINEAR	·	5.3 km	MPC · JPL
91765	1999 TE_{194}	—	October 12, 1999	Socorro	LINEAR	(21885)	7.5 km	MPC · JPL
91766	1999 TK_{194}	—	October 12, 1999	Socorro	LINEAR	EOS	4.1 km	MPC · JPL
91767	1999 TH_{196}	—	October 12, 1999	Socorro	LINEAR	·	5.6 km	MPC · JPL
91768	1999 TQ_{196}	—	October 12, 1999	Socorro	LINEAR	EOS	4.1 km	MPC · JPL
91769	1999 TS_{198}	—	October 12, 1999	Socorro	LINEAR	·	5.6 km	MPC · JPL
91770	1999 TE_{200}	—	October 12, 1999	Socorro	LINEAR	·	3.8 km	MPC · JPL
91771	1999 TW_{202}	—	October 13, 1999	Socorro	LINEAR	EOS	3.2 km	MPC · JPL
91772	1999 TD_{203}	—	October 13, 1999	Socorro	LINEAR	·	3.0 km	MPC · JPL
91773	1999 TL_{203}	—	October 13, 1999	Socorro	LINEAR	·	4.4 km	MPC · JPL
91774	1999 TT_{203}	—	October 13, 1999	Socorro	LINEAR	·	6.5 km	MPC · JPL
91775	1999 TH_{206}	—	October 13, 1999	Socorro	LINEAR	·	7.0 km	MPC · JPL
91776	1999 TJ_{206}	—	October 13, 1999	Socorro	LINEAR	T_{j} (2.98)	17 km	MPC · JPL
91777	1999 TM_{206}	—	October 13, 1999	Socorro	LINEAR	EOS	8.0 km	MPC · JPL
91778	1999 TG_{208}	—	October 14, 1999	Socorro	LINEAR	LUT	9.4 km	MPC · JPL
91779	1999 TL_{208}	—	October 14, 1999	Socorro	LINEAR	·	9.0 km	MPC · JPL
91780	1999 TH_{211}	—	October 15, 1999	Socorro	LINEAR	·	3.9 km	MPC · JPL
91781	1999 TR_{212}	—	October 15, 1999	Socorro	LINEAR	·	3.6 km	MPC · JPL
91782	1999 TO_{214}	—	October 15, 1999	Socorro	LINEAR	·	3.8 km	MPC · JPL
91783	1999 TQ_{216}	—	October 15, 1999	Socorro	LINEAR	KOR	2.9 km	MPC · JPL
91784	1999 TV_{216}	—	October 15, 1999	Socorro	LINEAR	·	4.0 km	MPC · JPL
91785	1999 TU_{217}	—	October 15, 1999	Socorro	LINEAR	EOS	3.7 km	MPC · JPL
91786	1999 TB_{219}	—	October 12, 1999	Socorro	LINEAR	EOS	3.7 km	MPC · JPL
91787	1999 TZ_{219}	—	October 1, 1999	Catalina	CSS	·	10 km	MPC · JPL
91788	1999 TG_{221}	—	October 2, 1999	Catalina	CSS	·	5.4 km	MPC · JPL
91789	1999 TH_{221}	—	October 2, 1999	Socorro	LINEAR	GEF	3.1 km	MPC · JPL
91790	1999 TF_{222}	—	October 2, 1999	Anderson Mesa	LONEOS	EOS · fast	6.0 km	MPC · JPL
91791	1999 TD_{223}	—	October 3, 1999	Catalina	CSS	EOS	4.4 km	MPC · JPL
91792	1999 TM_{223}	—	October 2, 1999	Socorro	LINEAR	·	4.1 km	MPC · JPL
91793	1999 TR_{227}	—	October 1, 1999	Catalina	CSS	TEL	2.8 km	MPC · JPL
91794	1999 TG_{228}	—	October 12, 1999	Socorro	LINEAR	·	4.7 km	MPC · JPL
91795	1999 TP_{228}	—	October 2, 1999	Socorro	LINEAR	·	3.6 km	MPC · JPL
91796	1999 TE_{230}	—	October 3, 1999	Anderson Mesa	LONEOS	NAE	6.5 km	MPC · JPL
91797	1999 TF_{233}	—	October 3, 1999	Socorro	LINEAR	BRA	5.2 km	MPC · JPL
91798	1999 TT_{233}	—	October 3, 1999	Socorro	LINEAR	GEF	2.6 km	MPC · JPL
91799	1999 TE_{234}	—	October 3, 1999	Socorro	LINEAR	·	5.9 km	MPC · JPL
91800	1999 TK_{234}	—	October 3, 1999	Socorro	LINEAR	·	8.3 km	MPC · JPL

== 91801–91900 ==
back to top

Designation			Discovery			Properties		Ref
Permanent	Provisional	Named after	Date	Site	Discoverer(s)	Category	Diam.	Ref
91801	1999 TC_{235}	—	October 3, 1999	Catalina	CSS	·	6.4 km	MPC · JPL
91802	1999 TH_{235}	—	October 3, 1999	Catalina	CSS	·	4.4 km	MPC · JPL
91803	1999 TZ_{235}	—	October 3, 1999	Catalina	CSS	·	5.4 km	MPC · JPL
91804	1999 TX_{237}	—	October 4, 1999	Kitt Peak	Spacewatch	KOR	2.4 km	MPC · JPL
91805	1999 TB_{241}	—	October 4, 1999	Catalina	CSS	EOS	3.6 km	MPC · JPL
91806	1999 TJ_{244}	—	October 7, 1999	Catalina	CSS	TIR	5.7 km	MPC · JPL
91807	1999 TU_{245}	—	October 7, 1999	Catalina	CSS	·	7.4 km	MPC · JPL
91808	1999 TH_{247}	—	October 8, 1999	Catalina	CSS	·	5.2 km	MPC · JPL
91809	1999 TG_{248}	—	October 8, 1999	Catalina	CSS	EOS	4.5 km	MPC · JPL
91810	1999 TQ_{249}	—	October 9, 1999	Catalina	CSS	·	4.8 km	MPC · JPL
91811	1999 TL_{252}	—	October 8, 1999	Socorro	LINEAR	·	4.1 km	MPC · JPL
91812	1999 TQ_{252}	—	October 9, 1999	Socorro	LINEAR	·	2.3 km	MPC · JPL
91813	1999 TL_{254}	—	October 8, 1999	Socorro	LINEAR	EOS	5.6 km	MPC · JPL
91814	1999 TV_{261}	—	October 13, 1999	Socorro	LINEAR	·	7.7 km	MPC · JPL
91815	1999 TO_{265}	—	October 3, 1999	Socorro	LINEAR	·	7.4 km	MPC · JPL
91816	1999 TA_{267}	—	October 3, 1999	Socorro	LINEAR	EOS	4.6 km	MPC · JPL
91817	1999 TG_{267}	—	October 3, 1999	Socorro	LINEAR	·	2.8 km	MPC · JPL
91818	1999 TU_{267}	—	October 3, 1999	Socorro	LINEAR	·	4.2 km	MPC · JPL
91819	1999 TB_{268}	—	October 3, 1999	Socorro	LINEAR	·	4.9 km	MPC · JPL
91820	1999 TT_{268}	—	October 3, 1999	Socorro	LINEAR	·	5.7 km	MPC · JPL
91821	1999 TN_{277}	—	October 6, 1999	Socorro	LINEAR	EOS	4.3 km	MPC · JPL
91822	1999 TU_{277}	—	October 6, 1999	Socorro	LINEAR	·	5.8 km	MPC · JPL
91823	1999 TJ_{280}	—	October 7, 1999	Socorro	LINEAR	·	4.6 km	MPC · JPL
91824	1999 TU_{280}	—	October 8, 1999	Socorro	LINEAR	·	4.9 km	MPC · JPL
91825	1999 TM_{281}	—	October 8, 1999	Socorro	LINEAR	·	3.9 km	MPC · JPL
91826	1999 TP_{281}	—	October 8, 1999	Socorro	LINEAR	·	8.9 km	MPC · JPL
91827	1999 TK_{282}	—	October 9, 1999	Socorro	LINEAR	·	5.0 km	MPC · JPL
91828	1999 TU_{282}	—	October 9, 1999	Socorro	LINEAR	KOR	2.7 km	MPC · JPL
91829	1999 TE_{284}	—	October 9, 1999	Socorro	LINEAR	·	5.8 km	MPC · JPL
91830	1999 TF_{297}	—	October 2, 1999	Catalina	CSS	·	4.8 km	MPC · JPL
91831	1999 TX_{298}	—	October 2, 1999	Kitt Peak	Spacewatch	KOR	1.9 km	MPC · JPL
91832	1999 TS_{300}	—	October 3, 1999	Catalina	CSS	EOS	3.7 km	MPC · JPL
91833	1999 TW_{304}	—	October 6, 1999	Socorro	LINEAR	·	2.4 km	MPC · JPL
91834	1999 TU_{308}	—	October 6, 1999	Kitt Peak	Spacewatch	KOR	2.4 km	MPC · JPL
91835	1999 TV_{310}	—	October 4, 1999	Kitt Peak	Spacewatch	·	4.2 km	MPC · JPL
91836	1999 TA_{311}	—	October 5, 1999	Catalina	CSS	·	5.7 km	MPC · JPL
91837	1999 TB_{311}	—	October 5, 1999	Catalina	CSS	KOR	3.7 km	MPC · JPL
91838	1999 TF_{314}	—	October 8, 1999	Socorro	LINEAR	LIX	6.9 km	MPC · JPL
91839	1999 TX_{314}	—	October 8, 1999	Catalina	CSS	·	7.4 km	MPC · JPL
91840	1999 TZ_{318}	—	October 12, 1999	Kitt Peak	Spacewatch	·	3.6 km	MPC · JPL
91841	1999 TA_{321}	—	October 10, 1999	Socorro	LINEAR	·	5.0 km	MPC · JPL
91842	1999 TP_{322}	—	October 2, 1999	Socorro	LINEAR	·	6.0 km	MPC · JPL
91843	1999 UF_{1}	—	October 16, 1999	Višnjan Observatory	K. Korlević	TIR	4.1 km	MPC · JPL
91844	1999 UR_{2}	—	October 19, 1999	Ondřejov	P. Kušnirák, P. Pravec	·	6.3 km	MPC · JPL
91845	1999 UT_{2}	—	October 19, 1999	Ondřejov	P. Kušnirák, P. Pravec	EOS	4.3 km	MPC · JPL
91846	1999 UY_{3}	—	October 31, 1999	Prescott	P. G. Comba	·	3.0 km	MPC · JPL
91847	1999 UW_{5}	—	October 29, 1999	Catalina	CSS	·	7.6 km	MPC · JPL
91848	1999 UG_{6}	—	October 28, 1999	Xinglong	SCAP	KOR	3.3 km	MPC · JPL
91849	1999 UK_{6}	—	October 28, 1999	Xinglong	SCAP	·	14 km	MPC · JPL
91850	1999 UN_{7}	—	October 31, 1999	Ondřejov	L. Kotková	VER	5.7 km	MPC · JPL
91851	1999 UA_{8}	—	October 29, 1999	Catalina	CSS	slow	6.1 km	MPC · JPL
91852	1999 UD_{8}	—	October 29, 1999	Catalina	CSS	KOR	3.4 km	MPC · JPL
91853	1999 UK_{8}	—	October 29, 1999	Catalina	CSS	·	7.1 km	MPC · JPL
91854	1999 UA_{9}	—	October 29, 1999	Catalina	CSS	·	4.7 km	MPC · JPL
91855	1999 UD_{11}	—	October 31, 1999	Socorro	LINEAR	·	6.8 km	MPC · JPL
91856	1999 UB_{13}	—	October 29, 1999	Catalina	CSS	·	7.0 km	MPC · JPL
91857	1999 UR_{13}	—	October 29, 1999	Catalina	CSS	TIR	5.4 km	MPC · JPL
91858	1999 US_{16}	—	October 29, 1999	Catalina	CSS	·	5.8 km	MPC · JPL
91859	1999 UX_{17}	—	October 30, 1999	Kitt Peak	Spacewatch	·	3.4 km	MPC · JPL
91860	1999 UL_{18}	—	October 30, 1999	Kitt Peak	Spacewatch	·	3.8 km	MPC · JPL
91861	1999 UT_{18}	—	October 30, 1999	Kitt Peak	Spacewatch	·	7.7 km	MPC · JPL
91862	1999 US_{20}	—	October 31, 1999	Kitt Peak	Spacewatch	·	2.8 km	MPC · JPL
91863	1999 UV_{23}	—	October 28, 1999	Catalina	CSS	·	3.7 km	MPC · JPL
91864	1999 UW_{24}	—	October 28, 1999	Catalina	CSS	·	10 km	MPC · JPL
91865	1999 UD_{25}	—	October 28, 1999	Catalina	CSS	·	7.6 km	MPC · JPL
91866	1999 UD_{27}	—	October 30, 1999	Kitt Peak	Spacewatch	·	4.6 km	MPC · JPL
91867	1999 UC_{30}	—	October 31, 1999	Kitt Peak	Spacewatch	·	3.1 km	MPC · JPL
91868	1999 UF_{36}	—	October 16, 1999	Kitt Peak	Spacewatch	·	4.5 km	MPC · JPL
91869 Ellenjozoff	1999 UU_{38}	Ellenjozoff	October 29, 1999	Anderson Mesa	LONEOS	·	10 km	MPC · JPL
91870 Malcolmjozoff	1999 UA_{39}	Malcolmjozoff	October 29, 1999	Anderson Mesa	LONEOS	·	5.1 km	MPC · JPL
91871	1999 UT_{39}	—	October 31, 1999	Kitt Peak	Spacewatch	·	6.0 km	MPC · JPL
91872	1999 UL_{41}	—	October 18, 1999	Kitt Peak	Spacewatch	fast	5.1 km	MPC · JPL
91873	1999 UM_{42}	—	October 28, 1999	Catalina	CSS	·	9.6 km	MPC · JPL
91874	1999 UW_{43}	—	October 29, 1999	Catalina	CSS	·	4.7 km	MPC · JPL
91875	1999 UF_{44}	—	October 29, 1999	Catalina	CSS	·	10 km	MPC · JPL
91876	1999 UO_{44}	—	October 30, 1999	Anderson Mesa	LONEOS	·	6.9 km	MPC · JPL
91877	1999 UK_{45}	—	October 31, 1999	Catalina	CSS	·	5.3 km	MPC · JPL
91878	1999 UV_{45}	—	October 31, 1999	Catalina	CSS	·	8.5 km	MPC · JPL
91879	1999 UZ_{45}	—	October 31, 1999	Catalina	CSS	·	4.4 km	MPC · JPL
91880	1999 UC_{46}	—	October 31, 1999	Catalina	CSS	EOS	5.1 km	MPC · JPL
91881	1999 UR_{46}	—	October 31, 1999	Anderson Mesa	LONEOS	·	4.7 km	MPC · JPL
91882	1999 UT_{48}	—	October 31, 1999	Catalina	CSS	·	4.3 km	MPC · JPL
91883	1999 UG_{49}	—	October 31, 1999	Catalina	CSS	HYG	5.3 km	MPC · JPL
91884	1999 UH_{49}	—	October 31, 1999	Catalina	CSS	HYG	4.7 km	MPC · JPL
91885	1999 UK_{49}	—	October 31, 1999	Catalina	CSS	·	5.0 km	MPC · JPL
91886	1999 UB_{50}	—	October 30, 1999	Catalina	CSS	·	3.8 km	MPC · JPL
91887	1999 UZ_{50}	—	October 30, 1999	Kitt Peak	Spacewatch	·	4.5 km	MPC · JPL
91888 Tomskilling	1999 UA_{51}	Tomskilling	October 31, 1999	Catalina	CSS	·	4.3 km	MPC · JPL
91889	1999 UQ_{59}	—	October 31, 1999	Catalina	CSS	·	4.4 km	MPC · JPL
91890 Kiriko Matsuri	1999 VD_{2}	Kiriko Matsuri	November 4, 1999	Yanagida	Tsuchikawa, A.	EOS	5.6 km	MPC · JPL
91891	1999 VJ_{2}	—	November 5, 1999	Oizumi	T. Kobayashi	EOS	5.0 km	MPC · JPL
91892	1999 VB_{3}	—	November 1, 1999	Kitt Peak	Spacewatch	THM	4.3 km	MPC · JPL
91893	1999 VP_{4}	—	November 1, 1999	Catalina	CSS	EOS	7.8 km	MPC · JPL
91894	1999 VH_{5}	—	November 6, 1999	High Point	D. K. Chesney	·	6.8 km	MPC · JPL
91895	1999 VV_{5}	—	November 5, 1999	Oizumi	T. Kobayashi	EOS	5.4 km	MPC · JPL
91896	1999 VY_{9}	—	November 9, 1999	Fountain Hills	C. W. Juels	·	4.8 km	MPC · JPL
91897	1999 VB_{10}	—	November 9, 1999	Fountain Hills	C. W. Juels	·	5.8 km	MPC · JPL
91898 Margnetti	1999 VB_{11}	Margnetti	November 8, 1999	Gnosca	S. Sposetti	·	5.2 km	MPC · JPL
91899	1999 VT_{11}	—	November 7, 1999	Reedy Creek	J. Broughton	EOS	4.9 km	MPC · JPL
91900	1999 VV_{11}	—	November 5, 1999	San Marcello	L. Tesi, M. Tombelli	HYG	6.2 km	MPC · JPL

== 91901–92000 ==
back to top

Designation			Discovery			Properties		Ref
Permanent	Provisional	Named after	Date	Site	Discoverer(s)	Category	Diam.	Ref
91901	1999 VB_{15}	—	November 2, 1999	Kitt Peak	Spacewatch	·	3.6 km	MPC · JPL
91902	1999 VU_{17}	—	November 2, 1999	Kitt Peak	Spacewatch	EOS	4.2 km	MPC · JPL
91903	1999 VA_{19}	—	November 10, 1999	Farpoint	G. Bell, G. Hug	·	8.6 km	MPC · JPL
91904	1999 VW_{19}	—	November 7, 1999	Reedy Creek	J. Broughton	THM	4.9 km	MPC · JPL
91905	1999 VB_{20}	—	November 10, 1999	Višnjan Observatory	K. Korlević	·	4.5 km	MPC · JPL
91906	1999 VE_{24}	—	November 15, 1999	Zeno	T. Stafford	·	10 km	MPC · JPL
91907 Shiho	1999 VA_{26}	Shiho	November 13, 1999	Kuma Kogen	A. Nakamura	·	5.7 km	MPC · JPL
91908	1999 VK_{27}	—	November 3, 1999	Catalina	CSS	·	13 km	MPC · JPL
91909	1999 VZ_{28}	—	November 3, 1999	Socorro	LINEAR	KOR	3.4 km	MPC · JPL
91910	1999 VD_{29}	—	November 3, 1999	Socorro	LINEAR	THM	4.4 km	MPC · JPL
91911	1999 VQ_{29}	—	November 3, 1999	Socorro	LINEAR	·	6.1 km	MPC · JPL
91912	1999 VC_{30}	—	November 3, 1999	Socorro	LINEAR	·	6.0 km	MPC · JPL
91913	1999 VD_{30}	—	November 3, 1999	Socorro	LINEAR	HYG	6.0 km	MPC · JPL
91914	1999 VD_{31}	—	November 3, 1999	Socorro	LINEAR	THM	5.0 km	MPC · JPL
91915	1999 VF_{31}	—	November 3, 1999	Socorro	LINEAR	·	6.8 km	MPC · JPL
91916	1999 VL_{31}	—	November 3, 1999	Socorro	LINEAR	·	4.7 km	MPC · JPL
91917	1999 VT_{31}	—	November 3, 1999	Socorro	LINEAR	·	3.6 km	MPC · JPL
91918	1999 VS_{32}	—	November 3, 1999	Socorro	LINEAR	THM	6.1 km	MPC · JPL
91919	1999 VE_{33}	—	November 3, 1999	Socorro	LINEAR	·	3.8 km	MPC · JPL
91920	1999 VF_{33}	—	November 3, 1999	Socorro	LINEAR	·	5.8 km	MPC · JPL
91921	1999 VN_{33}	—	November 3, 1999	Socorro	LINEAR	·	4.8 km	MPC · JPL
91922	1999 VP_{37}	—	November 3, 1999	Socorro	LINEAR	·	9.1 km	MPC · JPL
91923	1999 VE_{38}	—	November 10, 1999	Socorro	LINEAR	·	4.9 km	MPC · JPL
91924	1999 VL_{38}	—	November 10, 1999	Socorro	LINEAR	·	4.7 km	MPC · JPL
91925	1999 VM_{38}	—	November 10, 1999	Socorro	LINEAR	·	5.2 km	MPC · JPL
91926	1999 VN_{38}	—	November 10, 1999	Socorro	LINEAR	·	5.6 km	MPC · JPL
91927	1999 VA_{39}	—	November 10, 1999	Socorro	LINEAR	·	6.5 km	MPC · JPL
91928	1999 VY_{47}	—	November 3, 1999	Socorro	LINEAR	EOS	4.9 km	MPC · JPL
91929	1999 VO_{48}	—	November 3, 1999	Socorro	LINEAR	EOS	4.8 km	MPC · JPL
91930	1999 VT_{48}	—	November 3, 1999	Socorro	LINEAR	·	4.2 km	MPC · JPL
91931	1999 VK_{52}	—	November 3, 1999	Socorro	LINEAR	EOS	4.8 km	MPC · JPL
91932	1999 VT_{53}	—	November 4, 1999	Socorro	LINEAR	·	4.9 km	MPC · JPL
91933	1999 VB_{54}	—	November 4, 1999	Socorro	LINEAR	·	10 km	MPC · JPL
91934	1999 VM_{54}	—	November 4, 1999	Socorro	LINEAR	THM	4.8 km	MPC · JPL
91935	1999 VE_{55}	—	November 4, 1999	Socorro	LINEAR	·	8.5 km	MPC · JPL
91936	1999 VC_{57}	—	November 4, 1999	Socorro	LINEAR	·	5.9 km	MPC · JPL
91937	1999 VQ_{58}	—	November 4, 1999	Socorro	LINEAR	·	12 km	MPC · JPL
91938	1999 VB_{60}	—	November 4, 1999	Socorro	LINEAR	·	5.7 km	MPC · JPL
91939	1999 VY_{60}	—	November 4, 1999	Socorro	LINEAR	·	9.7 km	MPC · JPL
91940	1999 VZ_{60}	—	November 4, 1999	Socorro	LINEAR	·	6.9 km	MPC · JPL
91941	1999 VR_{63}	—	November 4, 1999	Socorro	LINEAR	EOS	5.3 km	MPC · JPL
91942	1999 VV_{63}	—	November 4, 1999	Socorro	LINEAR	THM	5.2 km	MPC · JPL
91943	1999 VA_{64}	—	November 4, 1999	Socorro	LINEAR	·	9.5 km	MPC · JPL
91944	1999 VO_{64}	—	November 4, 1999	Socorro	LINEAR	·	6.2 km	MPC · JPL
91945	1999 VU_{64}	—	November 4, 1999	Socorro	LINEAR	THM	7.3 km	MPC · JPL
91946	1999 VM_{65}	—	November 4, 1999	Socorro	LINEAR	TIR	7.7 km	MPC · JPL
91947	1999 VT_{65}	—	November 4, 1999	Socorro	LINEAR	·	6.1 km	MPC · JPL
91948	1999 VV_{67}	—	November 4, 1999	Socorro	LINEAR	·	5.6 km	MPC · JPL
91949	1999 VY_{67}	—	November 4, 1999	Socorro	LINEAR	EOS	4.2 km	MPC · JPL
91950	1999 VN_{68}	—	November 4, 1999	Socorro	LINEAR	·	6.7 km	MPC · JPL
91951	1999 VS_{68}	—	November 4, 1999	Socorro	LINEAR	·	8.4 km	MPC · JPL
91952	1999 VV_{70}	—	November 4, 1999	Socorro	LINEAR	THM	4.7 km	MPC · JPL
91953	1999 VS_{71}	—	November 4, 1999	Socorro	LINEAR	·	4.5 km	MPC · JPL
91954	1999 VV_{76}	—	November 5, 1999	Kitt Peak	Spacewatch	·	4.9 km	MPC · JPL
91955	1999 VK_{77}	—	November 3, 1999	Socorro	LINEAR	·	6.8 km	MPC · JPL
91956	1999 VN_{77}	—	November 3, 1999	Socorro	LINEAR	EOS	4.5 km	MPC · JPL
91957	1999 VO_{78}	—	November 4, 1999	Socorro	LINEAR	HYG	6.9 km	MPC · JPL
91958	1999 VM_{79}	—	November 4, 1999	Socorro	LINEAR	EOS	3.9 km	MPC · JPL
91959	1999 VR_{79}	—	November 4, 1999	Socorro	LINEAR	·	4.9 km	MPC · JPL
91960	1999 VA_{80}	—	November 4, 1999	Socorro	LINEAR	H	820 m	MPC · JPL
91961	1999 VH_{80}	—	November 4, 1999	Socorro	LINEAR	·	5.4 km	MPC · JPL
91962	1999 VR_{85}	—	November 4, 1999	Socorro	LINEAR	·	4.6 km	MPC · JPL
91963	1999 VB_{86}	—	November 4, 1999	Socorro	LINEAR	·	3.8 km	MPC · JPL
91964	1999 VS_{88}	—	November 4, 1999	Socorro	LINEAR	·	5.9 km	MPC · JPL
91965	1999 VM_{89}	—	November 5, 1999	Socorro	LINEAR	THM	6.5 km	MPC · JPL
91966	1999 VP_{91}	—	November 5, 1999	Socorro	LINEAR	·	7.6 km	MPC · JPL
91967	1999 VZ_{91}	—	November 9, 1999	Socorro	LINEAR	MAR	2.8 km	MPC · JPL
91968	1999 VA_{92}	—	November 9, 1999	Socorro	LINEAR	·	6.3 km	MPC · JPL
91969	1999 VC_{92}	—	November 9, 1999	Socorro	LINEAR	·	5.1 km	MPC · JPL
91970	1999 VK_{92}	—	November 9, 1999	Socorro	LINEAR	·	3.1 km	MPC · JPL
91971	1999 VO_{92}	—	November 9, 1999	Socorro	LINEAR	KOR	4.3 km	MPC · JPL
91972	1999 VW_{92}	—	November 9, 1999	Socorro	LINEAR	EOS	4.4 km	MPC · JPL
91973	1999 VL_{93}	—	November 9, 1999	Socorro	LINEAR	EOS	4.7 km	MPC · JPL
91974	1999 VG_{94}	—	November 9, 1999	Socorro	LINEAR	EOS	3.9 km	MPC · JPL
91975	1999 VN_{94}	—	November 9, 1999	Socorro	LINEAR	THM	4.4 km	MPC · JPL
91976	1999 VD_{96}	—	November 9, 1999	Socorro	LINEAR	·	3.6 km	MPC · JPL
91977	1999 VH_{96}	—	November 9, 1999	Socorro	LINEAR	HYG	6.1 km	MPC · JPL
91978	1999 VV_{96}	—	November 9, 1999	Socorro	LINEAR	THM	3.6 km	MPC · JPL
91979	1999 VU_{97}	—	November 9, 1999	Socorro	LINEAR	·	4.6 km	MPC · JPL
91980	1999 VD_{98}	—	November 9, 1999	Socorro	LINEAR	EOS	4.4 km	MPC · JPL
91981	1999 VB_{99}	—	November 9, 1999	Socorro	LINEAR	HYG	8.2 km	MPC · JPL
91982	1999 VC_{102}	—	November 9, 1999	Socorro	LINEAR	·	4.7 km	MPC · JPL
91983	1999 VY_{103}	—	November 9, 1999	Socorro	LINEAR	·	3.4 km	MPC · JPL
91984	1999 VE_{106}	—	November 9, 1999	Socorro	LINEAR	·	7.3 km	MPC · JPL
91985	1999 VO_{113}	—	November 4, 1999	Catalina	CSS	·	6.8 km	MPC · JPL
91986	1999 VD_{114}	—	November 9, 1999	Catalina	CSS	·	6.4 km	MPC · JPL
91987	1999 VF_{114}	—	November 9, 1999	Catalina	CSS	·	4.8 km	MPC · JPL
91988	1999 VL_{114}	—	November 9, 1999	Catalina	CSS	EOS	4.0 km	MPC · JPL
91989	1999 VO_{114}	—	November 9, 1999	Catalina	CSS	EOS	4.5 km	MPC · JPL
91990	1999 VO_{115}	—	November 4, 1999	Kitt Peak	Spacewatch	·	4.7 km	MPC · JPL
91991	1999 VH_{116}	—	November 4, 1999	Kitt Peak	Spacewatch	·	4.9 km	MPC · JPL
91992	1999 VD_{120}	—	November 4, 1999	Kitt Peak	Spacewatch	KOR	2.6 km	MPC · JPL
91993	1999 VP_{122}	—	November 5, 1999	Kitt Peak	Spacewatch	EOS	2.9 km	MPC · JPL
91994	1999 VF_{124}	—	November 6, 1999	Kitt Peak	Spacewatch	EOS	3.2 km	MPC · JPL
91995	1999 VC_{133}	—	November 10, 1999	Kitt Peak	Spacewatch	EOS	3.6 km	MPC · JPL
91996	1999 VG_{133}	—	November 10, 1999	Kitt Peak	Spacewatch	LUT	6.9 km	MPC · JPL
91997	1999 VQ_{135}	—	November 8, 1999	Socorro	LINEAR	·	5.1 km	MPC · JPL
91998	1999 VE_{137}	—	November 12, 1999	Socorro	LINEAR	·	4.2 km	MPC · JPL
91999	1999 VL_{139}	—	November 10, 1999	Kitt Peak	Spacewatch	·	5.3 km	MPC · JPL
92000	1999 VN_{144}	—	November 11, 1999	Catalina	CSS	EUP	8.7 km	MPC · JPL

back to top

== See also ==
- Meanings of minor-planet names: 91001–92000
