= Meanings of minor-planet names: 50001–51000 =

As minor planet discoveries are confirmed, they are given a permanent number by the IAU's Minor Planet Center (MPC), and the discoverers can then submit names for them, following the IAU's naming conventions. The list below concerns those minor planets in the specified number-range that have received names, and explains the meanings of those names.

Official naming citations of newly named small Solar System bodies are approved and published in a bulletin by IAU's Working Group for Small Bodies Nomenclature (WGSBN). Before May 2021, citations were published in MPC's Minor Planet Circulars for many decades. Recent citations can also be found on the JPL Small-Body Database (SBDB). Until his death in 2016, German astronomer Lutz D. Schmadel compiled these citations into the Dictionary of Minor Planet Names (DMP) and regularly updated the collection.

Based on Paul Herget's The Names of the Minor Planets, Schmadel also researched the unclear origin of numerous asteroids, most of which had been named prior to World War II. This article incorporates text from this source, which is in the public domain: SBDB New namings may only be added to this list below after official publication as the preannouncement of names is condemned. The WGSBN publishes a comprehensive guideline for the naming rules of non-cometary small Solar System bodies.

== 50001–50100 ==
Named minor planet	Provisional	This minor planet was named for...	Ref · Catalog
50033 Perelman	2000 AF_{48}	Grigori Perelman (born 1966), Russian mathematician	JPL · 50033

== 50101–50200 ==
back to top

Named minor planet	Provisional	This minor planet was named for...	Ref · Catalog
There are no named minor planets in this number range

== 50201–50300 ==
back to top

Named minor planet	Provisional	This minor planet was named for...	Ref · Catalog
50240 Cortina	2000 BY_{3}	Cortina d'Ampezzo, holiday resort in the Dolomites, Italy, host to the 1956 Winter Olympics, and near to the Col Drusciè Observatory	JPL · 50240
50250 Daveharrington	2000 BW_{22}	David L. Harrington (born 1939) is a retired automobile engineer.	JPL · 50250
50251 Iorg	2000 BY_{22}	Caroll Iorg (born 1946), a most enthusiastic amateur astronomer having been President of the Astronomical League (2010–2014) and currently serving as Media Officer.	JPL · 50251
50252 Dianahannikainen	2000 BE_{23}	Diana Hannikainen (born 1967), Finnish-American astronomer.	JPL · 50252
50271 Albertoanunziato	2000 CW	Alberto Anunziato, Argentinian amateur astronomer.	IAU · 50271
50275 Marcocasalini	2000 CU_{1}	Marco Casalini (b. 1966), an Italian amateur astronomer.	IAU · 50275

== 50301–50400 ==
back to top

Named minor planet	Provisional	This minor planet was named for...	Ref · Catalog
50310 Richardjakiel	2000 CT_{40}	Richard Jakiel, American teacher of astronomy and physics at both the university and high-school level.	IAU · 50310

== 50401–50500 ==
back to top

Named minor planet	Provisional	This minor planet was named for...	Ref · Catalog
50401 Richardmeyers	2000 CJ_{109}	Richard Meyers, Arizona-based astronomy enthusiast and astrophotographer.	IAU · 50401
50412 Ewen	2000 DG_{1}	Harry Ewen (born 1957), a Canadian amateur astronomer	MPC · 50412
50413 Petrginz	2000 DQ_{1}	Petr Ginz (1928–1944), Czech-Jewish boy who edited Vedem, a secret magazine, in the Terezín ghetto during World War II	MPC · 50413
50426 Mikemerrifield	2000 DJ_{15}	Michael Merrifield, British emeritus professor of astronomy at the University of Nottingham.	IAU · 50426
50427 Ralphmerrifield	2000 DT_{15}	Ralph Merrifield, British archaeologist.	IAU · 50427
50428 Alexanderdessler	2000 DZ_{15}	Alexander J. Dessler (1928–2023) is a space physicist who shaped understanding of how charged particles interact with magnetic fields of Solar System objects. He first defined the existence and characteristics of the heliosphere, confirmed when Voyager 1 crossed the heliopause	JPL · 50428

== 50501–50600 ==
back to top

Named minor planet	Provisional	This minor planet was named for...	Ref · Catalog
50537 Emilianobiscardi	2000 EH_{14}	Emiliano Biscardi (b. 1980), an Italian amateur astronomer.	IAU · 50537
50553 Dilles	2000 EL_{21}	Shawn Dilles (b. 1960), the Assistant Coordinator for the Publications Section of the Association of Lunar and Planetary Observers (ALPO) and Editor of The Strolling Astronomer, the journal of ALPO. He is also an author and historian living in Virginia.	IAU · 50553

== 50601–50700 ==
back to top

Named minor planet	Provisional	This minor planet was named for...	Ref · Catalog
50687 Paultemple	2000 EC_{117}	Paul Temple, pastor and amateur astronomer in Deming, New Mexico	JPL · 50687

== 50701–50800 ==
back to top

Named minor planet	Provisional	This minor planet was named for...	Ref · Catalog
50717 Jimfox	2000 EN_{138}	Jim Fox (born 1945) started in astronomy in the 1950s with a "Junior Moon-Watch Team". He is the founder of what became the Minnesota Astronomical Society as well as a past President of the Astronomical League (1990–94). He was awarded the 2014 Leslie C. Peltier Award from the AAVSO.	JPL · 50717
50718 Timrobertson	2000 ED_{139}	Tim Robertson (born 1956) is a Quality Engineer at NASA's Goddard Space Flight Center, with the GOES and JPSS weather satellite programs. On staff with the Association of Lunar and Planetary Observers (ALPO), he is Coordinator for the ALPO Training Program as well as Producer of the "Observer's Notebook" podcasts.	JPL · 50718
50719 Elizabethgriffin	2000 EG_{140}	Elizabeth Griffin (born 1942) is a Canadian astronomer specializing in the spectroscopic study of binary stars. She has been a staunch advocate globally for the digitization and preservation of photographic plates and using legacy science data of all kinds.	JPL · 50719
50721 Waynebailey	2000 EU_{141}	Wayne Bailey (born 1942) worked in the aerospace industry supporting the Space Shuttle Spacelab program. He became the Association of Lunar and Planetary Observers (ALPO) Lunar Coordinator in 2008 and in 2017 was the recipient of the ALPO Peggy Haas Service Award.	JPL · 50721
50722 Sherlin	2000 EW_{141}	Jerry Sherlin (1944–2018) was a meteorologist for the U.S. Air Force specializing in space weather as a research assistant at Sacramento Peak Solar Observatory. He was also the 22nd President of the Astronomical League and very well known in astronomy, being a member of many professional and amateur organizations.	JPL · 50722
50723 Beckley	2000 EG_{143}	Elizabeth Beckley (c. 1846–1927) was the first observer with the new photoheliograph at the Kew Observatory, London. In the 1860s, and continued for over a decade, she was using the labor-intensive ‘wet collodion’ process in solar photography for the first time.	IAU · 50723
50724 Elizabethbrown	2000 EK_{145}	Elizabeth Brown (1830-1899), English astronomer, founding member of the British Astronomical Association and first director of the group's Solar Section	IAU · 50724
50725 Margarethuggins	2000 EH_{146}	Margaret Lindsay Huggins (1848-1915), pioneered photonic spectrography alongside her husband, William	IAU · 50725
50726 Anniemaunder	2000 EH_{147}	Annie S. D. Maunder (1868-1947), Irish-English astronomer with the Greenwich Observatory, developed the butterfly diagram for solar cycles alongside husband E. Walter	IAU · 50726
50727 Aliceverett	2000 EO_{147}	Alice Everett (1865–1949), a Scottish astronomer and engineer.	IAU · 50727
50728 Catherinestevens	2000 ED_{148}	Catherine Octavia Stevens (1865–1959), a British amateur astronomer.	IAU · 50728
50729 Fiammetta	2000 ET_{148}	Fiammetta Wilson (1864–1920), a prolific and dedicated meteor observer and amateur researcher with the British Astronomical Association.	IAU · 50729
50739 Gracecook	2000 EY_{156}	A. Grace Cook (1877-1958), British astronomer and Fellow of the Royal Astronomical Society. A skilled observer, she viewed the 1914 transit of Mercury from her observatory.	IAU · 50739
50753 Maryblagg	2000 EO_{177}	Mary Adela Blagg (1858-1944), English astronomer and Fellow of the Royal Astronomical Society. As a member of the British Astronomical Association, she helped create a standardized nomenclature for lunar formations.	IAU · 50753
50768 Ianwessen	2000 FW_{2}	Ian Remington Wessen (born 1992) has excelled as an honor student in high school, spent two summers learning the Russian language and six weeks working for the Europa Jupiter System Mission team	JPL · 50768

== 50801–50900 ==
back to top

Named minor planet	Provisional	This minor planet was named for...	Ref · Catalog
50855 Williamschultz	2000 FK_{55}	William Schultz Jr. (1904–1975) was with the Cranbrook school system in Bloomfield Hills, Michigan from 1930 to 1969. A man of many interests (astronomy, mineralogy, ham radio), he refurbished the Cranbrook (now Hulbert) Observatory. He built their first planetarium, becoming the first Resident Astronomer.	IAU · 50855
50866 Davidesprizzi	2000 GX_{3}	Davide Sprizzi (born 2013), the son of the discoverer's daughter.	JPL · 50866

== 50901–51000 ==
back to top

Named minor planet	Provisional	This minor planet was named for...	Ref · Catalog
There are no named minor planets in this number range

back to top

Preceded by 49,001–50,000	Meanings of minor-planet names List of minor planets: 50,001–51,000	Succeeded by 51,001–52,000
