= List of minor planets: 50001–51000 =

The following is a partial list of minor planets, running from minor-planet number 50001 through 51000, inclusive. The primary data for this and other partial lists is based on JPL's "Small-Body Orbital Elements" and data available from the Minor Planet Center. Critical list information is also provided by the MPC, unless otherwise specified from Lowell Observatory. A detailed description of the table's columns and additional sources are given on the main page including a complete list of every page in this series, and a statistical break-up on the dynamical classification of minor planets.

Also see the summary list of all named bodies in numerical and alphabetical order, and the corresponding naming citations for the number range of this particular list. New namings may only be added to this list after official publication, as the preannouncement of names is condemned by the Working Group for Small Bodies Nomenclature of the International Astronomical Union.

| Near-Earth obj. | MBA (inner) | MBA (outer) | Centaur |
| Mars-crosser | MBA (middle) | Jupiter trojan | Trans-Neptunian obj. |
| Unclassified |

== 50001–50100 ==
| Designation | | | Discovery | | | Properties | | Ref |
| Permanent | Provisional | Named after | Date | Site | Discoverer(s) | Category | Diam. | Ref |
|---|---|---|---|---|---|---|---|---|
| 50001 | 2000 AK_{15} | — | January 3, 2000 | Socorro | LINEAR | · | 2.1 km | MPC · JPL |
| 50002 | 2000 AB_{16} | — | January 3, 2000 | Socorro | LINEAR | · | 3.4 km | MPC · JPL |
| 50003 | 2000 AM_{16} | — | January 3, 2000 | Socorro | LINEAR | V | 2.4 km | MPC · JPL |
| 50004 | 2000 AS_{16} | — | January 3, 2000 | Socorro | LINEAR | · | 3.8 km | MPC · JPL |
| 50005 | 2000 AW_{18} | — | January 3, 2000 | Socorro | LINEAR | · | 4.5 km | MPC · JPL |
| 50006 | 2000 AY_{19} | — | January 3, 2000 | Socorro | LINEAR | · | 2.7 km | MPC · JPL |
| 50007 | 2000 AW_{21} | — | January 3, 2000 | Socorro | LINEAR | · | 3.0 km | MPC · JPL |
| 50008 | 2000 AF_{25} | — | January 3, 2000 | Socorro | LINEAR | MAS | 2.8 km | MPC · JPL |
| 50009 | 2000 AQ_{26} | — | January 3, 2000 | Socorro | LINEAR | · | 2.2 km | MPC · JPL |
| 50010 | 2000 AP_{27} | — | January 3, 2000 | Socorro | LINEAR | · | 4.0 km | MPC · JPL |
| 50011 | 2000 AE_{29} | — | January 3, 2000 | Socorro | LINEAR | · | 2.6 km | MPC · JPL |
| 50012 | 2000 AS_{30} | — | January 3, 2000 | Socorro | LINEAR | · | 2.1 km | MPC · JPL |
| 50013 | 2000 AE_{31} | — | January 3, 2000 | Socorro | LINEAR | NYS | 3.8 km | MPC · JPL |
| 50014 | 2000 AO_{32} | — | January 3, 2000 | Socorro | LINEAR | · | 3.3 km | MPC · JPL |
| 50015 | 2000 AR_{32} | — | January 3, 2000 | Socorro | LINEAR | V | 2.7 km | MPC · JPL |
| 50016 | 2000 AT_{32} | — | January 3, 2000 | Socorro | LINEAR | · | 2.1 km | MPC · JPL |
| 50017 | 2000 AA_{33} | — | January 3, 2000 | Socorro | LINEAR | · | 2.2 km | MPC · JPL |
| 50018 | 2000 AK_{33} | — | January 3, 2000 | Socorro | LINEAR | V | 2.0 km | MPC · JPL |
| 50019 | 2000 AL_{33} | — | January 3, 2000 | Socorro | LINEAR | · | 3.6 km | MPC · JPL |
| 50020 | 2000 AL_{34} | — | January 3, 2000 | Socorro | LINEAR | · | 2.6 km | MPC · JPL |
| 50021 | 2000 AA_{36} | — | January 3, 2000 | Socorro | LINEAR | · | 1.7 km | MPC · JPL |
| 50022 | 2000 AX_{36} | — | January 3, 2000 | Socorro | LINEAR | · | 3.7 km | MPC · JPL |
| 50023 | 2000 AY_{37} | — | January 3, 2000 | Socorro | LINEAR | · | 5.4 km | MPC · JPL |
| 50024 | 2000 AZ_{40} | — | January 3, 2000 | Socorro | LINEAR | · | 6.4 km | MPC · JPL |
| 50025 | 2000 AR_{41} | — | January 3, 2000 | Socorro | LINEAR | V | 1.9 km | MPC · JPL |
| 50026 | 2000 AS_{41} | — | January 3, 2000 | Socorro | LINEAR | · | 3.2 km | MPC · JPL |
| 50027 | 2000 AQ_{43} | — | January 2, 2000 | Kitt Peak | Spacewatch | · | 2.1 km | MPC · JPL |
| 50028 | 2000 AN_{44} | — | January 5, 2000 | Kitt Peak | Spacewatch | · | 3.8 km | MPC · JPL |
| 50029 | 2000 AU_{46} | — | January 4, 2000 | Socorro | LINEAR | MAS | 1.6 km | MPC · JPL |
| 50030 | 2000 AG_{47} | — | January 4, 2000 | Socorro | LINEAR | · | 2.9 km | MPC · JPL |
| 50031 | 2000 AH_{47} | — | January 4, 2000 | Socorro | LINEAR | · | 3.1 km | MPC · JPL |
| 50032 | 2000 AT_{47} | — | January 4, 2000 | Socorro | LINEAR | V | 1.7 km | MPC · JPL |
| 50033 Perelman | 2000 AF_{48} | Perelman | January 3, 2000 | Gnosca | S. Sposetti | · | 6.0 km | MPC · JPL |
| 50034 | 2000 AJ_{48} | — | January 6, 2000 | Prescott | P. G. Comba | slow | 2.8 km | MPC · JPL |
| 50035 | 2000 AL_{50} | — | January 6, 2000 | Višnjan Observatory | K. Korlević | · | 1.8 km | MPC · JPL |
| 50036 | 2000 AH_{53} | — | January 4, 2000 | Socorro | LINEAR | · | 3.0 km | MPC · JPL |
| 50037 | 2000 AR_{54} | — | January 4, 2000 | Socorro | LINEAR | · | 3.3 km | MPC · JPL |
| 50038 | 2000 AT_{54} | — | January 4, 2000 | Socorro | LINEAR | · | 8.5 km | MPC · JPL |
| 50039 | 2000 AV_{56} | — | January 4, 2000 | Socorro | LINEAR | · | 3.2 km | MPC · JPL |
| 50040 | 2000 AL_{57} | — | January 4, 2000 | Socorro | LINEAR | · | 2.3 km | MPC · JPL |
| 50041 | 2000 AL_{58} | — | January 4, 2000 | Socorro | LINEAR | · | 3.8 km | MPC · JPL |
| 50042 | 2000 AW_{58} | — | January 4, 2000 | Socorro | LINEAR | EUN | 2.8 km | MPC · JPL |
| 50043 | 2000 AC_{59} | — | January 4, 2000 | Socorro | LINEAR | · | 4.8 km | MPC · JPL |
| 50044 | 2000 AW_{60} | — | January 4, 2000 | Socorro | LINEAR | · | 5.2 km | MPC · JPL |
| 50045 | 2000 AB_{61} | — | January 4, 2000 | Socorro | LINEAR | · | 4.6 km | MPC · JPL |
| 50046 | 2000 AL_{61} | — | January 4, 2000 | Socorro | LINEAR | · | 2.7 km | MPC · JPL |
| 50047 | 2000 AA_{62} | — | January 4, 2000 | Socorro | LINEAR | · | 4.9 km | MPC · JPL |
| 50048 | 2000 AL_{62} | — | January 4, 2000 | Socorro | LINEAR | V | 2.8 km | MPC · JPL |
| 50049 | 2000 AQ_{62} | — | January 4, 2000 | Socorro | LINEAR | V | 3.4 km | MPC · JPL |
| 50050 | 2000 AB_{63} | — | January 4, 2000 | Socorro | LINEAR | · | 3.2 km | MPC · JPL |
| 50051 | 2000 AH_{63} | — | January 4, 2000 | Socorro | LINEAR | · | 2.9 km | MPC · JPL |
| 50052 | 2000 AV_{63} | — | January 4, 2000 | Socorro | LINEAR | · | 4.8 km | MPC · JPL |
| 50053 | 2000 AR_{64} | — | January 4, 2000 | Socorro | LINEAR | · | 3.3 km | MPC · JPL |
| 50054 | 2000 AD_{65} | — | January 4, 2000 | Socorro | LINEAR | · | 3.3 km | MPC · JPL |
| 50055 | 2000 AE_{65} | — | January 4, 2000 | Socorro | LINEAR | · | 3.6 km | MPC · JPL |
| 50056 | 2000 AN_{66} | — | January 4, 2000 | Socorro | LINEAR | MAR | 4.6 km | MPC · JPL |
| 50057 | 2000 AO_{66} | — | January 4, 2000 | Socorro | LINEAR | · | 7.7 km | MPC · JPL |
| 50058 | 2000 AQ_{67} | — | January 4, 2000 | Socorro | LINEAR | NYS | 3.0 km | MPC · JPL |
| 50059 | 2000 AY_{67} | — | January 4, 2000 | Socorro | LINEAR | · | 5.3 km | MPC · JPL |
| 50060 | 2000 AA_{68} | — | January 4, 2000 | Socorro | LINEAR | (2076) | 2.8 km | MPC · JPL |
| 50061 | 2000 AF_{69} | — | January 5, 2000 | Socorro | LINEAR | · | 2.4 km | MPC · JPL |
| 50062 | 2000 AD_{71} | — | January 5, 2000 | Socorro | LINEAR | · | 2.5 km | MPC · JPL |
| 50063 | 2000 AY_{71} | — | January 5, 2000 | Socorro | LINEAR | · | 2.6 km | MPC · JPL |
| 50064 | 2000 AQ_{72} | — | January 5, 2000 | Socorro | LINEAR | V | 2.3 km | MPC · JPL |
| 50065 | 2000 AF_{74} | — | January 5, 2000 | Socorro | LINEAR | · | 6.3 km | MPC · JPL |
| 50066 | 2000 AH_{75} | — | January 5, 2000 | Socorro | LINEAR | · | 1.9 km | MPC · JPL |
| 50067 | 2000 AS_{75} | — | January 5, 2000 | Socorro | LINEAR | · | 2.2 km | MPC · JPL |
| 50068 | 2000 AR_{77} | — | January 5, 2000 | Socorro | LINEAR | ERI | 5.0 km | MPC · JPL |
| 50069 | 2000 AM_{78} | — | January 5, 2000 | Socorro | LINEAR | V | 2.0 km | MPC · JPL |
| 50070 | 2000 AG_{80} | — | January 5, 2000 | Socorro | LINEAR | V | 1.8 km | MPC · JPL |
| 50071 | 2000 AL_{81} | — | January 5, 2000 | Socorro | LINEAR | · | 1.9 km | MPC · JPL |
| 50072 | 2000 AU_{81} | — | January 5, 2000 | Socorro | LINEAR | · | 2.7 km | MPC · JPL |
| 50073 | 2000 AA_{82} | — | January 5, 2000 | Socorro | LINEAR | · | 1.8 km | MPC · JPL |
| 50074 | 2000 AN_{83} | — | January 5, 2000 | Socorro | LINEAR | · | 2.3 km | MPC · JPL |
| 50075 | 2000 AT_{84} | — | January 5, 2000 | Socorro | LINEAR | NYS | 3.0 km | MPC · JPL |
| 50076 | 2000 AP_{85} | — | January 5, 2000 | Socorro | LINEAR | · | 2.6 km | MPC · JPL |
| 50077 | 2000 AJ_{86} | — | January 5, 2000 | Socorro | LINEAR | · | 1.9 km | MPC · JPL |
| 50078 | 2000 AW_{86} | — | January 5, 2000 | Socorro | LINEAR | · | 2.2 km | MPC · JPL |
| 50079 | 2000 AB_{88} | — | January 5, 2000 | Socorro | LINEAR | · | 4.1 km | MPC · JPL |
| 50080 | 2000 AK_{88} | — | January 5, 2000 | Socorro | LINEAR | · | 2.1 km | MPC · JPL |
| 50081 | 2000 AL_{88} | — | January 5, 2000 | Socorro | LINEAR | · | 2.3 km | MPC · JPL |
| 50082 | 2000 AW_{88} | — | January 5, 2000 | Socorro | LINEAR | V | 2.2 km | MPC · JPL |
| 50083 | 2000 AG_{89} | — | January 5, 2000 | Socorro | LINEAR | · | 2.7 km | MPC · JPL |
| 50084 | 2000 AZ_{89} | — | January 5, 2000 | Socorro | LINEAR | V | 2.0 km | MPC · JPL |
| 50085 | 2000 AS_{90} | — | January 5, 2000 | Socorro | LINEAR | · | 2.2 km | MPC · JPL |
| 50086 | 2000 AT_{90} | — | January 5, 2000 | Socorro | LINEAR | V | 2.3 km | MPC · JPL |
| 50087 | 2000 AH_{91} | — | January 5, 2000 | Socorro | LINEAR | · | 3.2 km | MPC · JPL |
| 50088 | 2000 AO_{94} | — | January 4, 2000 | Socorro | LINEAR | · | 2.3 km | MPC · JPL |
| 50089 | 2000 AA_{95} | — | January 4, 2000 | Socorro | LINEAR | · | 2.7 km | MPC · JPL |
| 50090 | 2000 AN_{96} | — | January 4, 2000 | Socorro | LINEAR | PHO | 2.7 km | MPC · JPL |
| 50091 | 2000 AP_{96} | — | January 4, 2000 | Socorro | LINEAR | · | 2.5 km | MPC · JPL |
| 50092 | 2000 AR_{96} | — | January 4, 2000 | Socorro | LINEAR | · | 3.4 km | MPC · JPL |
| 50093 | 2000 AT_{96} | — | January 4, 2000 | Socorro | LINEAR | · | 2.1 km | MPC · JPL |
| 50094 | 2000 AB_{97} | — | January 4, 2000 | Socorro | LINEAR | · | 2.9 km | MPC · JPL |
| 50095 | 2000 AE_{97} | — | January 4, 2000 | Socorro | LINEAR | · | 3.1 km | MPC · JPL |
| 50096 | 2000 AM_{97} | — | January 4, 2000 | Socorro | LINEAR | · | 4.5 km | MPC · JPL |
| 50097 | 2000 AF_{98} | — | January 4, 2000 | Socorro | LINEAR | · | 4.2 km | MPC · JPL |
| 50098 | 2000 AG_{98} | — | January 4, 2000 | Socorro | LINEAR | · | 4.2 km | MPC · JPL |
| 50099 | 2000 AM_{98} | — | January 4, 2000 | Socorro | LINEAR | · | 4.6 km | MPC · JPL |
| 50100 | 2000 AH_{102} | — | January 5, 2000 | Socorro | LINEAR | · | 1.8 km | MPC · JPL |

== 50101–50200 ==
back to top

| Designation | | | Discovery | | | Properties | | Ref |
| Permanent | Provisional | Named after | Date | Site | Discoverer(s) | Category | Diam. | Ref |
|---|---|---|---|---|---|---|---|---|
| 50101 | 2000 AO_{105} | — | January 5, 2000 | Socorro | LINEAR | · | 2.1 km | MPC · JPL |
| 50102 | 2000 AA_{106} | — | January 5, 2000 | Socorro | LINEAR | · | 2.2 km | MPC · JPL |
| 50103 | 2000 AR_{111} | — | January 5, 2000 | Socorro | LINEAR | · | 3.3 km | MPC · JPL |
| 50104 | 2000 AU_{111} | — | January 5, 2000 | Socorro | LINEAR | · | 2.6 km | MPC · JPL |
| 50105 | 2000 AX_{111} | — | January 5, 2000 | Socorro | LINEAR | · | 3.8 km | MPC · JPL |
| 50106 | 2000 AC_{113} | — | January 5, 2000 | Socorro | LINEAR | · | 1.8 km | MPC · JPL |
| 50107 | 2000 AP_{113} | — | January 5, 2000 | Socorro | LINEAR | · | 1.9 km | MPC · JPL |
| 50108 | 2000 AU_{113} | — | January 5, 2000 | Socorro | LINEAR | · | 2.3 km | MPC · JPL |
| 50109 | 2000 AY_{113} | — | January 5, 2000 | Socorro | LINEAR | · | 11 km | MPC · JPL |
| 50110 | 2000 AP_{115} | — | January 5, 2000 | Socorro | LINEAR | · | 4.3 km | MPC · JPL |
| 50111 | 2000 AA_{116} | — | January 5, 2000 | Socorro | LINEAR | EUN | 3.9 km | MPC · JPL |
| 50112 | 2000 AJ_{116} | — | January 5, 2000 | Socorro | LINEAR | · | 4.5 km | MPC · JPL |
| 50113 | 2000 AL_{116} | — | January 5, 2000 | Socorro | LINEAR | EUN | 3.5 km | MPC · JPL |
| 50114 | 2000 AC_{117} | — | January 5, 2000 | Socorro | LINEAR | V | 2.5 km | MPC · JPL |
| 50115 | 2000 AU_{117} | — | January 5, 2000 | Socorro | LINEAR | · | 1.6 km | MPC · JPL |
| 50116 | 2000 AA_{119} | — | January 5, 2000 | Socorro | LINEAR | AGN | 3.6 km | MPC · JPL |
| 50117 | 2000 AD_{119} | — | January 5, 2000 | Socorro | LINEAR | · | 4.1 km | MPC · JPL |
| 50118 | 2000 AJ_{119} | — | January 5, 2000 | Socorro | LINEAR | · | 1.9 km | MPC · JPL |
| 50119 | 2000 AS_{119} | — | January 5, 2000 | Socorro | LINEAR | · | 2.7 km | MPC · JPL |
| 50120 | 2000 AC_{120} | — | January 5, 2000 | Socorro | LINEAR | V | 1.9 km | MPC · JPL |
| 50121 | 2000 AS_{122} | — | January 5, 2000 | Socorro | LINEAR | · | 3.3 km | MPC · JPL |
| 50122 | 2000 AO_{123} | — | January 5, 2000 | Socorro | LINEAR | · | 3.2 km | MPC · JPL |
| 50123 | 2000 AR_{123} | — | January 5, 2000 | Socorro | LINEAR | · | 1.8 km | MPC · JPL |
| 50124 | 2000 AT_{123} | — | January 5, 2000 | Socorro | LINEAR | · | 2.2 km | MPC · JPL |
| 50125 | 2000 AB_{124} | — | January 5, 2000 | Socorro | LINEAR | · | 1.7 km | MPC · JPL |
| 50126 | 2000 AT_{124} | — | January 5, 2000 | Socorro | LINEAR | · | 2.8 km | MPC · JPL |
| 50127 | 2000 AZ_{124} | — | January 5, 2000 | Socorro | LINEAR | · | 3.3 km | MPC · JPL |
| 50128 | 2000 AG_{125} | — | January 5, 2000 | Socorro | LINEAR | (2076) | 1.8 km | MPC · JPL |
| 50129 | 2000 AN_{125} | — | January 5, 2000 | Socorro | LINEAR | GEF | 3.1 km | MPC · JPL |
| 50130 | 2000 AP_{125} | — | January 5, 2000 | Socorro | LINEAR | · | 3.3 km | MPC · JPL |
| 50131 | 2000 AS_{125} | — | January 5, 2000 | Socorro | LINEAR | · | 2.8 km | MPC · JPL |
| 50132 | 2000 AU_{125} | — | January 5, 2000 | Socorro | LINEAR | · | 4.6 km | MPC · JPL |
| 50133 | 2000 AD_{126} | — | January 5, 2000 | Socorro | LINEAR | V | 1.9 km | MPC · JPL |
| 50134 | 2000 AM_{126} | — | January 5, 2000 | Socorro | LINEAR | · | 3.1 km | MPC · JPL |
| 50135 | 2000 AU_{127} | — | January 5, 2000 | Socorro | LINEAR | · | 2.0 km | MPC · JPL |
| 50136 | 2000 AK_{128} | — | January 5, 2000 | Socorro | LINEAR | · | 3.9 km | MPC · JPL |
| 50137 | 2000 AT_{128} | — | January 5, 2000 | Socorro | LINEAR | · | 4.6 km | MPC · JPL |
| 50138 | 2000 AY_{128} | — | January 5, 2000 | Socorro | LINEAR | V | 1.7 km | MPC · JPL |
| 50139 | 2000 AH_{129} | — | January 5, 2000 | Socorro | LINEAR | · | 4.4 km | MPC · JPL |
| 50140 | 2000 AQ_{129} | — | January 5, 2000 | Socorro | LINEAR | (5) | 3.4 km | MPC · JPL |
| 50141 | 2000 AW_{129} | — | January 5, 2000 | Socorro | LINEAR | · | 2.4 km | MPC · JPL |
| 50142 | 2000 AY_{129} | — | January 5, 2000 | Socorro | LINEAR | · | 6.7 km | MPC · JPL |
| 50143 | 2000 AB_{132} | — | January 3, 2000 | Socorro | LINEAR | · | 2.1 km | MPC · JPL |
| 50144 | 2000 AN_{132} | — | January 3, 2000 | Socorro | LINEAR | · | 1.9 km | MPC · JPL |
| 50145 | 2000 AV_{133} | — | January 4, 2000 | Socorro | LINEAR | · | 1.8 km | MPC · JPL |
| 50146 | 2000 AU_{134} | — | January 4, 2000 | Socorro | LINEAR | · | 3.3 km | MPC · JPL |
| 50147 | 2000 AQ_{136} | — | January 4, 2000 | Socorro | LINEAR | · | 2.7 km | MPC · JPL |
| 50148 | 2000 AR_{136} | — | January 4, 2000 | Socorro | LINEAR | V | 2.0 km | MPC · JPL |
| 50149 | 2000 AU_{136} | — | January 4, 2000 | Socorro | LINEAR | EUN | 4.6 km | MPC · JPL |
| 50150 | 2000 AY_{136} | — | January 4, 2000 | Socorro | LINEAR | · | 5.3 km | MPC · JPL |
| 50151 | 2000 AU_{140} | — | January 5, 2000 | Socorro | LINEAR | · | 2.3 km | MPC · JPL |
| 50152 | 2000 AD_{141} | — | January 5, 2000 | Socorro | LINEAR | · | 2.2 km | MPC · JPL |
| 50153 | 2000 AF_{141} | — | January 5, 2000 | Socorro | LINEAR | · | 4.0 km | MPC · JPL |
| 50154 | 2000 AK_{141} | — | January 5, 2000 | Socorro | LINEAR | · | 2.5 km | MPC · JPL |
| 50155 | 2000 AB_{142} | — | January 5, 2000 | Socorro | LINEAR | · | 2.3 km | MPC · JPL |
| 50156 | 2000 AN_{142} | — | January 5, 2000 | Socorro | LINEAR | · | 5.3 km | MPC · JPL |
| 50157 | 2000 AD_{143} | — | January 5, 2000 | Socorro | LINEAR | · | 3.5 km | MPC · JPL |
| 50158 | 2000 AR_{143} | — | January 5, 2000 | Socorro | LINEAR | PHO | 4.4 km | MPC · JPL |
| 50159 | 2000 AE_{144} | — | January 5, 2000 | Socorro | LINEAR | V | 2.2 km | MPC · JPL |
| 50160 | 2000 AF_{144} | — | January 5, 2000 | Socorro | LINEAR | · | 4.2 km | MPC · JPL |
| 50161 | 2000 AM_{144} | — | January 5, 2000 | Socorro | LINEAR | · | 3.1 km | MPC · JPL |
| 50162 | 2000 AH_{146} | — | January 7, 2000 | Socorro | LINEAR | PHO | 3.4 km | MPC · JPL |
| 50163 | 2000 AV_{146} | — | January 7, 2000 | Socorro | LINEAR | · | 2.9 km | MPC · JPL |
| 50164 | 2000 AW_{146} | — | January 7, 2000 | Socorro | LINEAR | · | 2.5 km | MPC · JPL |
| 50165 | 2000 AT_{147} | — | January 5, 2000 | Socorro | LINEAR | · | 3.1 km | MPC · JPL |
| 50166 | 2000 AW_{150} | — | January 8, 2000 | Socorro | LINEAR | · | 4.0 km | MPC · JPL |
| 50167 | 2000 AU_{154} | — | January 3, 2000 | Socorro | LINEAR | V | 1.9 km | MPC · JPL |
| 50168 | 2000 AH_{155} | — | January 3, 2000 | Socorro | LINEAR | · | 2.1 km | MPC · JPL |
| 50169 | 2000 AK_{157} | — | January 3, 2000 | Socorro | LINEAR | · | 3.4 km | MPC · JPL |
| 50170 | 2000 AT_{158} | — | January 3, 2000 | Socorro | LINEAR | NYS | 5.2 km | MPC · JPL |
| 50171 | 2000 AA_{159} | — | January 3, 2000 | Socorro | LINEAR | · | 4.0 km | MPC · JPL |
| 50172 | 2000 AC_{159} | — | January 3, 2000 | Socorro | LINEAR | · | 4.0 km | MPC · JPL |
| 50173 | 2000 AK_{159} | — | January 3, 2000 | Socorro | LINEAR | · | 2.1 km | MPC · JPL |
| 50174 | 2000 AQ_{159} | — | January 3, 2000 | Socorro | LINEAR | · | 2.5 km | MPC · JPL |
| 50175 | 2000 AQ_{161} | — | January 3, 2000 | Socorro | LINEAR | PHO | 3.8 km | MPC · JPL |
| 50176 | 2000 AH_{163} | — | January 5, 2000 | Socorro | LINEAR | slow | 3.9 km | MPC · JPL |
| 50177 | 2000 AT_{163} | — | January 5, 2000 | Socorro | LINEAR | V | 1.6 km | MPC · JPL |
| 50178 | 2000 AV_{163} | — | January 5, 2000 | Socorro | LINEAR | (2076) | 2.1 km | MPC · JPL |
| 50179 | 2000 AW_{163} | — | January 5, 2000 | Socorro | LINEAR | · | 2.7 km | MPC · JPL |
| 50180 | 2000 AD_{164} | — | January 5, 2000 | Socorro | LINEAR | · | 3.9 km | MPC · JPL |
| 50181 | 2000 AH_{167} | — | January 8, 2000 | Socorro | LINEAR | · | 3.4 km | MPC · JPL |
| 50182 | 2000 AB_{168} | — | January 8, 2000 | Socorro | LINEAR | VER | 12 km | MPC · JPL |
| 50183 | 2000 AC_{168} | — | January 8, 2000 | Socorro | LINEAR | EUN | 4.5 km | MPC · JPL |
| 50184 | 2000 AN_{168} | — | January 13, 2000 | Kleť | Kleť | · | 3.2 km | MPC · JPL |
| 50185 | 2000 AD_{170} | — | January 7, 2000 | Socorro | LINEAR | · | 6.1 km | MPC · JPL |
| 50186 | 2000 AZ_{174} | — | January 7, 2000 | Socorro | LINEAR | V | 1.7 km | MPC · JPL |
| 50187 | 2000 AG_{176} | — | January 7, 2000 | Socorro | LINEAR | · | 4.5 km | MPC · JPL |
| 50188 | 2000 AU_{184} | — | January 7, 2000 | Socorro | LINEAR | · | 2.6 km | MPC · JPL |
| 50189 | 2000 AB_{190} | — | January 8, 2000 | Socorro | LINEAR | MAR | 3.8 km | MPC · JPL |
| 50190 | 2000 AK_{193} | — | January 8, 2000 | Socorro | LINEAR | · | 7.1 km | MPC · JPL |
| 50191 | 2000 AQ_{193} | — | January 8, 2000 | Socorro | LINEAR | EUN | 3.5 km | MPC · JPL |
| 50192 | 2000 AT_{193} | — | January 8, 2000 | Socorro | LINEAR | · | 4.2 km | MPC · JPL |
| 50193 | 2000 AM_{194} | — | January 8, 2000 | Socorro | LINEAR | · | 5.5 km | MPC · JPL |
| 50194 | 2000 AX_{194} | — | January 8, 2000 | Socorro | LINEAR | · | 2.1 km | MPC · JPL |
| 50195 | 2000 AL_{197} | — | January 8, 2000 | Socorro | LINEAR | · | 3.7 km | MPC · JPL |
| 50196 | 2000 AM_{198} | — | January 8, 2000 | Socorro | LINEAR | V | 2.9 km | MPC · JPL |
| 50197 | 2000 AS_{198} | — | January 8, 2000 | Socorro | LINEAR | EUN | 3.1 km | MPC · JPL |
| 50198 | 2000 AT_{198} | — | January 8, 2000 | Socorro | LINEAR | · | 3.8 km | MPC · JPL |
| 50199 | 2000 AS_{201} | — | January 9, 2000 | Socorro | LINEAR | · | 3.7 km | MPC · JPL |
| 50200 | 2000 AB_{203} | — | January 10, 2000 | Socorro | LINEAR | EUN | 5.8 km | MPC · JPL |

== 50201–50300 ==
back to top

| Designation | | | Discovery | | | Properties | | Ref |
| Permanent | Provisional | Named after | Date | Site | Discoverer(s) | Category | Diam. | Ref |
|---|---|---|---|---|---|---|---|---|
| 50201 | 2000 AC_{203} | — | January 10, 2000 | Socorro | LINEAR | · | 4.1 km | MPC · JPL |
| 50202 | 2000 AF_{203} | — | January 10, 2000 | Socorro | LINEAR | · | 4.0 km | MPC · JPL |
| 50203 | 2000 AH_{203} | — | January 10, 2000 | Socorro | LINEAR | EUN | 4.5 km | MPC · JPL |
| 50204 | 2000 AR_{203} | — | January 10, 2000 | Socorro | LINEAR | EUN | 4.8 km | MPC · JPL |
| 50205 | 2000 AP_{204} | — | January 8, 2000 | Socorro | LINEAR | · | 3.0 km | MPC · JPL |
| 50206 | 2000 AW_{209} | — | January 5, 2000 | Kitt Peak | Spacewatch | · | 2.3 km | MPC · JPL |
| 50207 | 2000 AV_{211} | — | January 5, 2000 | Kitt Peak | Spacewatch | · | 4.9 km | MPC · JPL |
| 50208 | 2000 AD_{222} | — | January 8, 2000 | Kitt Peak | Spacewatch | · | 3.8 km | MPC · JPL |
| 50209 | 2000 AR_{224} | — | January 11, 2000 | Kitt Peak | Spacewatch | · | 1.7 km | MPC · JPL |
| 50210 | 2000 AL_{228} | — | January 13, 2000 | Kitt Peak | Spacewatch | · | 4.2 km | MPC · JPL |
| 50211 | 2000 AA_{232} | — | January 4, 2000 | Socorro | LINEAR | slow | 3.4 km | MPC · JPL |
| 50212 | 2000 AJ_{233} | — | January 4, 2000 | Socorro | LINEAR | (5) | 3.7 km | MPC · JPL |
| 50213 | 2000 AJ_{234} | — | January 5, 2000 | Socorro | LINEAR | · | 2.7 km | MPC · JPL |
| 50214 | 2000 AV_{234} | — | January 5, 2000 | Socorro | LINEAR | · | 1.4 km | MPC · JPL |
| 50215 | 2000 AY_{235} | — | January 5, 2000 | Anderson Mesa | LONEOS | · | 2.9 km | MPC · JPL |
| 50216 | 2000 AT_{236} | — | January 5, 2000 | Socorro | LINEAR | (2076) | 3.1 km | MPC · JPL |
| 50217 | 2000 AU_{236} | — | January 5, 2000 | Socorro | LINEAR | V | 2.5 km | MPC · JPL |
| 50218 | 2000 AA_{237} | — | January 5, 2000 | Socorro | LINEAR | · | 2.5 km | MPC · JPL |
| 50219 | 2000 AL_{237} | — | January 5, 2000 | Socorro | LINEAR | EUN | 5.5 km | MPC · JPL |
| 50220 | 2000 AS_{237} | — | January 5, 2000 | Socorro | LINEAR | · | 11 km | MPC · JPL |
| 50221 | 2000 AQ_{238} | — | January 6, 2000 | Socorro | LINEAR | · | 3.7 km | MPC · JPL |
| 50222 | 2000 AV_{238} | — | January 6, 2000 | Socorro | LINEAR | · | 3.4 km | MPC · JPL |
| 50223 | 2000 AC_{239} | — | January 6, 2000 | Socorro | LINEAR | NYS | 2.0 km | MPC · JPL |
| 50224 | 2000 AS_{239} | — | January 6, 2000 | Socorro | LINEAR | · | 5.3 km | MPC · JPL |
| 50225 | 2000 AB_{240} | — | January 6, 2000 | Anderson Mesa | LONEOS | · | 3.2 km | MPC · JPL |
| 50226 | 2000 AH_{241} | — | January 7, 2000 | Socorro | LINEAR | · | 3.7 km | MPC · JPL |
| 50227 | 2000 AX_{241} | — | January 7, 2000 | Anderson Mesa | LONEOS | · | 3.1 km | MPC · JPL |
| 50228 | 2000 AD_{242} | — | January 7, 2000 | Anderson Mesa | LONEOS | · | 3.6 km | MPC · JPL |
| 50229 | 2000 AQ_{242} | — | January 7, 2000 | Socorro | LINEAR | · | 2.5 km | MPC · JPL |
| 50230 | 2000 AT_{244} | — | January 8, 2000 | Socorro | LINEAR | EOS | 6.6 km | MPC · JPL |
| 50231 | 2000 AQ_{245} | — | January 10, 2000 | Socorro | LINEAR | · | 4.6 km | MPC · JPL |
| 50232 | 2000 AR_{245} | — | January 10, 2000 | Socorro | LINEAR | EUN | 4.0 km | MPC · JPL |
| 50233 | 2000 AK_{246} | — | January 13, 2000 | Xinglong | SCAP | · | 2.1 km | MPC · JPL |
| 50234 | 2000 BP | — | January 27, 2000 | Prescott | P. G. Comba | V | 1.8 km | MPC · JPL |
| 50235 | 2000 BC_{2} | — | January 27, 2000 | Kitt Peak | Spacewatch | · | 4.6 km | MPC · JPL |
| 50236 | 2000 BB_{3} | — | January 26, 2000 | Višnjan Observatory | K. Korlević | · | 5.6 km | MPC · JPL |
| 50237 | 2000 BJ_{3} | — | January 27, 2000 | Oizumi | T. Kobayashi | · | 7.8 km | MPC · JPL |
| 50238 | 2000 BR_{3} | — | January 27, 2000 | Oizumi | T. Kobayashi | · | 2.6 km | MPC · JPL |
| 50239 | 2000 BW_{3} | — | January 27, 2000 | Oizumi | T. Kobayashi | SUL | 9.2 km | MPC · JPL |
| 50240 Cortina | 2000 BY_{3} | Cortina | January 28, 2000 | Cortina d'Ampezzo | A. Dimai | · | 3.5 km | MPC · JPL |
| 50241 | 2000 BB_{8} | — | January 29, 2000 | Socorro | LINEAR | V | 1.7 km | MPC · JPL |
| 50242 | 2000 BU_{11} | — | January 26, 2000 | Kitt Peak | Spacewatch | MAS | 2.3 km | MPC · JPL |
| 50243 | 2000 BT_{13} | — | January 29, 2000 | Kitt Peak | Spacewatch | · | 6.7 km | MPC · JPL |
| 50244 | 2000 BG_{14} | — | January 28, 2000 | Kitt Peak | Spacewatch | MAS | 2.1 km | MPC · JPL |
| 50245 | 2000 BL_{14} | — | January 28, 2000 | Oizumi | T. Kobayashi | V | 1.9 km | MPC · JPL |
| 50246 | 2000 BT_{14} | — | January 28, 2000 | Oizumi | T. Kobayashi | · | 13 km | MPC · JPL |
| 50247 | 2000 BX_{14} | — | January 31, 2000 | Oizumi | T. Kobayashi | · | 9.2 km | MPC · JPL |
| 50248 | 2000 BB_{16} | — | January 29, 2000 | Socorro | LINEAR | · | 3.3 km | MPC · JPL |
| 50249 | 2000 BL_{16} | — | January 30, 2000 | Socorro | LINEAR | EUN | 2.6 km | MPC · JPL |
| 50250 Daveharrington | 2000 BW_{22} | Daveharrington | January 30, 2000 | Catalina | CSS | · | 3.7 km | MPC · JPL |
| 50251 Iorg | 2000 BY_{22} | Iorg | January 30, 2000 | Catalina | CSS | · | 4.5 km | MPC · JPL |
| 50252 Dianahannikainen | 2000 BE_{23} | Dianahannikainen | January 30, 2000 | Catalina | CSS | · | 1.9 km | MPC · JPL |
| 50253 | 2000 BP_{24} | — | January 29, 2000 | Socorro | LINEAR | MAR | 3.8 km | MPC · JPL |
| 50254 | 2000 BC_{25} | — | January 30, 2000 | Socorro | LINEAR | · | 2.4 km | MPC · JPL |
| 50255 | 2000 BY_{25} | — | January 30, 2000 | Socorro | LINEAR | · | 3.3 km | MPC · JPL |
| 50256 | 2000 BJ_{26} | — | January 30, 2000 | Socorro | LINEAR | · | 2.0 km | MPC · JPL |
| 50257 | 2000 BQ_{26} | — | January 30, 2000 | Socorro | LINEAR | NYS | 2.7 km | MPC · JPL |
| 50258 | 2000 BV_{26} | — | January 30, 2000 | Socorro | LINEAR | · | 4.1 km | MPC · JPL |
| 50259 | 2000 BE_{27} | — | January 30, 2000 | Socorro | LINEAR | · | 3.8 km | MPC · JPL |
| 50260 | 2000 BK_{27} | — | January 30, 2000 | Socorro | LINEAR | · | 2.4 km | MPC · JPL |
| 50261 | 2000 BM_{27} | — | January 30, 2000 | Socorro | LINEAR | · | 2.9 km | MPC · JPL |
| 50262 | 2000 BN_{27} | — | January 30, 2000 | Socorro | LINEAR | NYS | 2.5 km | MPC · JPL |
| 50263 | 2000 BU_{27} | — | January 30, 2000 | Socorro | LINEAR | · | 3.8 km | MPC · JPL |
| 50264 | 2000 BX_{27} | — | January 30, 2000 | Socorro | LINEAR | · | 8.8 km | MPC · JPL |
| 50265 | 2000 BN_{28} | — | January 31, 2000 | Socorro | LINEAR | · | 2.7 km | MPC · JPL |
| 50266 | 2000 BU_{28} | — | January 30, 2000 | Socorro | LINEAR | GEF | 3.8 km | MPC · JPL |
| 50267 | 2000 BS_{29} | — | January 29, 2000 | Socorro | LINEAR | · | 3.2 km | MPC · JPL |
| 50268 | 2000 BD_{31} | — | January 30, 2000 | Socorro | LINEAR | WIT | 2.4 km | MPC · JPL |
| 50269 | 2000 BZ_{34} | — | January 30, 2000 | Socorro | LINEAR | V | 2.4 km | MPC · JPL |
| 50270 | 2000 CJ | — | February 2, 2000 | Prescott | P. G. Comba | · | 1.5 km | MPC · JPL |
| 50271 Albertoanunziato | 2000 CW | Albertoanunziato | February 1, 2000 | Catalina | CSS | · | 4.1 km | MPC · JPL |
| 50272 | 2000 CZ | — | February 3, 2000 | Višnjan Observatory | K. Korlević | · | 3.8 km | MPC · JPL |
| 50273 | 2000 CA_{1} | — | February 3, 2000 | Višnjan Observatory | K. Korlević | · | 2.9 km | MPC · JPL |
| 50274 | 2000 CN_{1} | — | February 4, 2000 | Višnjan Observatory | K. Korlević | · | 2.4 km | MPC · JPL |
| 50275 Marcocasalini | 2000 CU_{1} | Marcocasalini | February 4, 2000 | San Marcello | M. Tombelli, A. Boattini | · | 6.9 km | MPC · JPL |
| 50276 | 2000 CS_{2} | — | February 4, 2000 | Oizumi | T. Kobayashi | MAR · slow | 4.2 km | MPC · JPL |
| 50277 | 2000 CX_{6} | — | February 2, 2000 | Socorro | LINEAR | · | 3.7 km | MPC · JPL |
| 50278 | 2000 CZ_{12} | — | February 2, 2000 | Socorro | LINEAR | · | 3.2 km | MPC · JPL |
| 50279 | 2000 CX_{14} | — | February 2, 2000 | Socorro | LINEAR | · | 5.5 km | MPC · JPL |
| 50280 | 2000 CN_{17} | — | February 2, 2000 | Socorro | LINEAR | · | 3.4 km | MPC · JPL |
| 50281 | 2000 CV_{18} | — | February 2, 2000 | Socorro | LINEAR | EUN | 4.1 km | MPC · JPL |
| 50282 | 2000 CM_{19} | — | February 2, 2000 | Socorro | LINEAR | · | 2.4 km | MPC · JPL |
| 50283 | 2000 CO_{20} | — | February 2, 2000 | Socorro | LINEAR | HOF | 5.6 km | MPC · JPL |
| 50284 | 2000 CP_{23} | — | February 2, 2000 | Socorro | LINEAR | · | 6.2 km | MPC · JPL |
| 50285 | 2000 CB_{25} | — | February 2, 2000 | Socorro | LINEAR | · | 5.7 km | MPC · JPL |
| 50286 | 2000 CA_{26} | — | February 2, 2000 | Socorro | LINEAR | MAS | 1.7 km | MPC · JPL |
| 50287 | 2000 CT_{26} | — | February 2, 2000 | Socorro | LINEAR | · | 3.8 km | MPC · JPL |
| 50288 | 2000 CV_{26} | — | February 2, 2000 | Socorro | LINEAR | · | 8.2 km | MPC · JPL |
| 50289 | 2000 CJ_{27} | — | February 2, 2000 | Socorro | LINEAR | · | 3.8 km | MPC · JPL |
| 50290 | 2000 CT_{27} | — | February 2, 2000 | Socorro | LINEAR | · | 3.7 km | MPC · JPL |
| 50291 | 2000 CX_{28} | — | February 2, 2000 | Socorro | LINEAR | (5) | 4.0 km | MPC · JPL |
| 50292 | 2000 CW_{29} | — | February 2, 2000 | Socorro | LINEAR | · | 2.8 km | MPC · JPL |
| 50293 | 2000 CH_{30} | — | February 2, 2000 | Socorro | LINEAR | · | 4.1 km | MPC · JPL |
| 50294 | 2000 CN_{31} | — | February 2, 2000 | Socorro | LINEAR | CLA | 3.3 km | MPC · JPL |
| 50295 | 2000 CR_{31} | — | February 2, 2000 | Socorro | LINEAR | (11882) | 3.8 km | MPC · JPL |
| 50296 | 2000 CY_{32} | — | February 2, 2000 | Socorro | LINEAR | · | 7.2 km | MPC · JPL |
| 50297 | 2000 CS_{33} | — | February 4, 2000 | Višnjan Observatory | K. Korlević | · | 4.4 km | MPC · JPL |
| 50298 | 2000 CA_{34} | — | February 4, 2000 | Višnjan Observatory | K. Korlević | · | 4.5 km | MPC · JPL |
| 50299 | 2000 CD_{34} | — | February 4, 2000 | Višnjan Observatory | K. Korlević | · | 3.5 km | MPC · JPL |
| 50300 | 2000 CF_{34} | — | February 5, 2000 | Višnjan Observatory | K. Korlević | · | 2.7 km | MPC · JPL |

== 50301–50400 ==
back to top

| Designation | | | Discovery | | | Properties | | Ref |
| Permanent | Provisional | Named after | Date | Site | Discoverer(s) | Category | Diam. | Ref |
|---|---|---|---|---|---|---|---|---|
| 50301 | 2000 CL_{36} | — | February 2, 2000 | Socorro | LINEAR | · | 2.0 km | MPC · JPL |
| 50302 | 2000 CP_{36} | — | February 2, 2000 | Socorro | LINEAR | · | 5.4 km | MPC · JPL |
| 50303 | 2000 CX_{36} | — | February 2, 2000 | Socorro | LINEAR | · | 4.4 km | MPC · JPL |
| 50304 | 2000 CZ_{36} | — | February 2, 2000 | Socorro | LINEAR | · | 4.3 km | MPC · JPL |
| 50305 | 2000 CA_{37} | — | February 2, 2000 | Socorro | LINEAR | · | 2.6 km | MPC · JPL |
| 50306 | 2000 CA_{39} | — | February 3, 2000 | Socorro | LINEAR | · | 7.8 km | MPC · JPL |
| 50307 | 2000 CG_{39} | — | February 4, 2000 | Socorro | LINEAR | MAR | 2.8 km | MPC · JPL |
| 50308 | 2000 CK_{39} | — | February 4, 2000 | Socorro | LINEAR | · | 3.3 km | MPC · JPL |
| 50309 | 2000 CO_{40} | — | February 4, 2000 | Gekko | T. Kagawa | (5) | 3.4 km | MPC · JPL |
| 50310 Richardjakiel | 2000 CT_{40} | Richardjakiel | February 1, 2000 | Catalina | CSS | · | 3.9 km | MPC · JPL |
| 50311 | 2000 CC_{44} | — | February 2, 2000 | Socorro | LINEAR | · | 4.3 km | MPC · JPL |
| 50312 | 2000 CN_{45} | — | February 2, 2000 | Socorro | LINEAR | · | 3.7 km | MPC · JPL |
| 50313 | 2000 CX_{45} | — | February 2, 2000 | Socorro | LINEAR | · | 3.6 km | MPC · JPL |
| 50314 | 2000 CY_{46} | — | February 2, 2000 | Socorro | LINEAR | · | 2.5 km | MPC · JPL |
| 50315 | 2000 CV_{47} | — | February 2, 2000 | Socorro | LINEAR | · | 3.3 km | MPC · JPL |
| 50316 | 2000 CY_{47} | — | February 2, 2000 | Socorro | LINEAR | · | 3.5 km | MPC · JPL |
| 50317 | 2000 CZ_{47} | — | February 2, 2000 | Socorro | LINEAR | · | 3.3 km | MPC · JPL |
| 50318 | 2000 CS_{48} | — | February 2, 2000 | Socorro | LINEAR | V | 1.5 km | MPC · JPL |
| 50319 | 2000 CC_{50} | — | February 2, 2000 | Socorro | LINEAR | · | 7.3 km | MPC · JPL |
| 50320 | 2000 CT_{50} | — | February 2, 2000 | Socorro | LINEAR | DOR | 7.1 km | MPC · JPL |
| 50321 | 2000 CH_{51} | — | February 2, 2000 | Socorro | LINEAR | · | 7.9 km | MPC · JPL |
| 50322 | 2000 CK_{51} | — | February 2, 2000 | Socorro | LINEAR | · | 6.7 km | MPC · JPL |
| 50323 | 2000 CM_{52} | — | February 2, 2000 | Socorro | LINEAR | · | 2.6 km | MPC · JPL |
| 50324 | 2000 CS_{53} | — | February 2, 2000 | Socorro | LINEAR | V | 3.0 km | MPC · JPL |
| 50325 | 2000 CT_{53} | — | February 2, 2000 | Socorro | LINEAR | MAR | 4.7 km | MPC · JPL |
| 50326 | 2000 CH_{54} | — | February 2, 2000 | Socorro | LINEAR | · | 3.2 km | MPC · JPL |
| 50327 | 2000 CS_{55} | — | February 4, 2000 | Socorro | LINEAR | · | 4.4 km | MPC · JPL |
| 50328 | 2000 CW_{55} | — | February 4, 2000 | Socorro | LINEAR | · | 1.4 km | MPC · JPL |
| 50329 | 2000 CK_{56} | — | February 4, 2000 | Socorro | LINEAR | V | 2.5 km | MPC · JPL |
| 50330 | 2000 CN_{56} | — | February 10, 2000 | Socorro | LINEAR | · | 15 km | MPC · JPL |
| 50331 | 2000 CO_{56} | — | February 4, 2000 | Socorro | LINEAR | · | 3.8 km | MPC · JPL |
| 50332 | 2000 CP_{57} | — | February 5, 2000 | Socorro | LINEAR | · | 4.2 km | MPC · JPL |
| 50333 | 2000 CZ_{57} | — | February 5, 2000 | Socorro | LINEAR | EUN | 5.1 km | MPC · JPL |
| 50334 | 2000 CC_{58} | — | February 5, 2000 | Socorro | LINEAR | ADE | 11 km | MPC · JPL |
| 50335 | 2000 CM_{58} | — | February 5, 2000 | Socorro | LINEAR | · | 5.4 km | MPC · JPL |
| 50336 | 2000 CR_{60} | — | February 2, 2000 | Socorro | LINEAR | · | 3.5 km | MPC · JPL |
| 50337 | 2000 CD_{61} | — | February 2, 2000 | Socorro | LINEAR | NYS | 2.0 km | MPC · JPL |
| 50338 | 2000 CU_{61} | — | February 2, 2000 | Socorro | LINEAR | · | 2.0 km | MPC · JPL |
| 50339 | 2000 CF_{62} | — | February 2, 2000 | Socorro | LINEAR | GEF · | 6.4 km | MPC · JPL |
| 50340 | 2000 CH_{62} | — | February 2, 2000 | Socorro | LINEAR | · | 6.9 km | MPC · JPL |
| 50341 | 2000 CR_{63} | — | February 2, 2000 | Socorro | LINEAR | · | 3.2 km | MPC · JPL |
| 50342 | 2000 CT_{63} | — | February 2, 2000 | Socorro | LINEAR | · | 2.2 km | MPC · JPL |
| 50343 | 2000 CX_{64} | — | February 3, 2000 | Socorro | LINEAR | · | 5.1 km | MPC · JPL |
| 50344 | 2000 CA_{65} | — | February 3, 2000 | Socorro | LINEAR | · | 4.7 km | MPC · JPL |
| 50345 | 2000 CK_{65} | — | February 4, 2000 | Socorro | LINEAR | · | 3.6 km | MPC · JPL |
| 50346 | 2000 CP_{65} | — | February 4, 2000 | Socorro | LINEAR | · | 3.1 km | MPC · JPL |
| 50347 | 2000 CA_{66} | — | February 6, 2000 | Socorro | LINEAR | V | 1.4 km | MPC · JPL |
| 50348 | 2000 CF_{69} | — | February 1, 2000 | Kitt Peak | Spacewatch | NYS | 2.7 km | MPC · JPL |
| 50349 | 2000 CC_{70} | — | February 2, 2000 | Socorro | LINEAR | · | 5.6 km | MPC · JPL |
| 50350 | 2000 CD_{70} | — | February 6, 2000 | Socorro | LINEAR | GEF | 4.5 km | MPC · JPL |
| 50351 | 2000 CE_{70} | — | February 6, 2000 | Socorro | LINEAR | · | 3.6 km | MPC · JPL |
| 50352 | 2000 CK_{70} | — | February 7, 2000 | Socorro | LINEAR | EUN | 5.6 km | MPC · JPL |
| 50353 | 2000 CW_{70} | — | February 7, 2000 | Socorro | LINEAR | · | 4.1 km | MPC · JPL |
| 50354 | 2000 CX_{70} | — | February 7, 2000 | Socorro | LINEAR | · | 2.0 km | MPC · JPL |
| 50355 | 2000 CB_{71} | — | February 7, 2000 | Socorro | LINEAR | V | 2.8 km | MPC · JPL |
| 50356 | 2000 CH_{71} | — | February 7, 2000 | Socorro | LINEAR | · | 3.3 km | MPC · JPL |
| 50357 | 2000 CJ_{71} | — | February 7, 2000 | Socorro | LINEAR | (6769) · | 3.2 km | MPC · JPL |
| 50358 | 2000 CP_{71} | — | February 7, 2000 | Socorro | LINEAR | · | 6.6 km | MPC · JPL |
| 50359 | 2000 CO_{72} | — | February 2, 2000 | Socorro | LINEAR | V | 2.3 km | MPC · JPL |
| 50360 | 2000 CS_{75} | — | February 7, 2000 | Socorro | LINEAR | EUN | 3.4 km | MPC · JPL |
| 50361 | 2000 CE_{76} | — | February 5, 2000 | Višnjan Observatory | K. Korlević | · | 3.6 km | MPC · JPL |
| 50362 | 2000 CB_{77} | — | February 10, 2000 | Višnjan Observatory | K. Korlević | NYS | 4.0 km | MPC · JPL |
| 50363 | 2000 CD_{77} | — | February 10, 2000 | Višnjan Observatory | K. Korlević | EUN | 6.2 km | MPC · JPL |
| 50364 | 2000 CG_{77} | — | February 10, 2000 | Višnjan Observatory | K. Korlević | · | 8.0 km | MPC · JPL |
| 50365 | 2000 CP_{77} | — | February 7, 2000 | Siding Spring | R. H. McNaught | (5) | 2.9 km | MPC · JPL |
| 50366 | 2000 CW_{77} | — | February 7, 2000 | Kitt Peak | Spacewatch | · | 2.3 km | MPC · JPL |
| 50367 | 2000 CB_{80} | — | February 8, 2000 | Kitt Peak | Spacewatch | · | 6.1 km | MPC · JPL |
| 50368 | 2000 CY_{81} | — | February 4, 2000 | Socorro | LINEAR | NYS | 2.4 km | MPC · JPL |
| 50369 | 2000 CK_{83} | — | February 4, 2000 | Socorro | LINEAR | EUN | 3.9 km | MPC · JPL |
| 50370 | 2000 CL_{84} | — | February 4, 2000 | Socorro | LINEAR | · | 3.7 km | MPC · JPL |
| 50371 | 2000 CT_{84} | — | February 4, 2000 | Socorro | LINEAR | EOS | 6.8 km | MPC · JPL |
| 50372 | 2000 CF_{85} | — | February 4, 2000 | Socorro | LINEAR | · | 4.6 km | MPC · JPL |
| 50373 | 2000 CR_{85} | — | February 4, 2000 | Socorro | LINEAR | ERI | 3.7 km | MPC · JPL |
| 50374 | 2000 CG_{86} | — | February 4, 2000 | Socorro | LINEAR | · | 3.5 km | MPC · JPL |
| 50375 | 2000 CJ_{86} | — | February 4, 2000 | Socorro | LINEAR | NYS | 3.0 km | MPC · JPL |
| 50376 | 2000 CQ_{86} | — | February 4, 2000 | Socorro | LINEAR | · | 2.4 km | MPC · JPL |
| 50377 | 2000 CG_{88} | — | February 4, 2000 | Socorro | LINEAR | KOR | 3.9 km | MPC · JPL |
| 50378 | 2000 CV_{88} | — | February 4, 2000 | Socorro | LINEAR | · | 10 km | MPC · JPL |
| 50379 | 2000 CB_{89} | — | February 4, 2000 | Socorro | LINEAR | · | 6.8 km | MPC · JPL |
| 50380 | 2000 CE_{89} | — | February 4, 2000 | Socorro | LINEAR | EUN | 5.9 km | MPC · JPL |
| 50381 | 2000 CG_{89} | — | February 4, 2000 | Socorro | LINEAR | · | 4.7 km | MPC · JPL |
| 50382 | 2000 CH_{89} | — | February 4, 2000 | Socorro | LINEAR | NEM | 7.0 km | MPC · JPL |
| 50383 | 2000 CN_{89} | — | February 4, 2000 | Socorro | LINEAR | · | 2.9 km | MPC · JPL |
| 50384 | 2000 CQ_{89} | — | February 4, 2000 | Socorro | LINEAR | HNS | 3.9 km | MPC · JPL |
| 50385 | 2000 CZ_{89} | — | February 5, 2000 | Socorro | LINEAR | · | 3.8 km | MPC · JPL |
| 50386 | 2000 CG_{91} | — | February 6, 2000 | Socorro | LINEAR | · | 1.9 km | MPC · JPL |
| 50387 | 2000 CM_{91} | — | February 6, 2000 | Socorro | LINEAR | · | 5.9 km | MPC · JPL |
| 50388 | 2000 CM_{92} | — | February 6, 2000 | Socorro | LINEAR | THM | 7.7 km | MPC · JPL |
| 50389 | 2000 CO_{92} | — | February 6, 2000 | Socorro | LINEAR | · | 4.7 km | MPC · JPL |
| 50390 | 2000 CE_{93} | — | February 6, 2000 | Socorro | LINEAR | GEF | 3.4 km | MPC · JPL |
| 50391 | 2000 CK_{93} | — | February 6, 2000 | Socorro | LINEAR | · | 4.5 km | MPC · JPL |
| 50392 | 2000 CD_{94} | — | February 8, 2000 | Socorro | LINEAR | EOS | 5.6 km | MPC · JPL |
| 50393 | 2000 CN_{94} | — | February 8, 2000 | Socorro | LINEAR | · | 6.9 km | MPC · JPL |
| 50394 | 2000 CQ_{94} | — | February 8, 2000 | Socorro | LINEAR | · | 7.7 km | MPC · JPL |
| 50395 | 2000 CR_{94} | — | February 8, 2000 | Socorro | LINEAR | EUN | 3.8 km | MPC · JPL |
| 50396 | 2000 CT_{94} | — | February 8, 2000 | Socorro | LINEAR | · | 3.7 km | MPC · JPL |
| 50397 | 2000 CX_{94} | — | February 8, 2000 | Socorro | LINEAR | · | 5.7 km | MPC · JPL |
| 50398 | 2000 CR_{96} | — | February 6, 2000 | Socorro | LINEAR | · | 2.0 km | MPC · JPL |
| 50399 | 2000 CQ_{102} | — | February 2, 2000 | Socorro | LINEAR | · | 6.4 km | MPC · JPL |
| 50400 | 2000 CU_{102} | — | February 2, 2000 | Socorro | LINEAR | · | 2.7 km | MPC · JPL |

== 50401–50500 ==
back to top

| Designation | | | Discovery | | | Properties | | Ref |
| Permanent | Provisional | Named after | Date | Site | Discoverer(s) | Category | Diam. | Ref |
|---|---|---|---|---|---|---|---|---|
| 50401 Richardmeyers | 2000 CJ_{109} | Richardmeyers | February 5, 2000 | Catalina | CSS | slow | 3.8 km | MPC · JPL |
| 50402 | 2000 CN_{111} | — | February 6, 2000 | Catalina | CSS | · | 4.0 km | MPC · JPL |
| 50403 | 2000 CB_{114} | — | February 15, 2000 | Socorro | LINEAR | PHO | 6.6 km | MPC · JPL |
| 50404 | 2000 CV_{115} | — | February 2, 2000 | Catalina | CSS | EOS | 5.2 km | MPC · JPL |
| 50405 | 2000 CB_{116} | — | February 2, 2000 | Catalina | CSS | V | 1.7 km | MPC · JPL |
| 50406 | 2000 CK_{116} | — | February 3, 2000 | Socorro | LINEAR | · | 4.0 km | MPC · JPL |
| 50407 | 2000 CY_{117} | — | February 3, 2000 | Socorro | LINEAR | KOR | 3.0 km | MPC · JPL |
| 50408 | 2000 CZ_{124} | — | February 3, 2000 | Socorro | LINEAR | · | 3.9 km | MPC · JPL |
| 50409 | 2000 CO_{125} | — | February 3, 2000 | Socorro | LINEAR | · | 3.7 km | MPC · JPL |
| 50410 | 2000 CK_{126} | — | February 4, 2000 | Socorro | LINEAR | · | 4.9 km | MPC · JPL |
| 50411 | 2000 DS | — | February 24, 2000 | Oizumi | T. Kobayashi | · | 12 km | MPC · JPL |
| 50412 Ewen | 2000 DG_{1} | Ewen | February 26, 2000 | Rock Finder | W. K. Y. Yeung | (12739) | 5.5 km | MPC · JPL |
| 50413 Petrginz | 2000 DQ_{1} | Petrginz | February 27, 2000 | Kleť | J. Tichá, M. Tichý | · | 3.3 km | MPC · JPL |
| 50414 | 2000 DB_{2} | — | February 26, 2000 | Kitt Peak | Spacewatch | HYG | 8.6 km | MPC · JPL |
| 50415 | 2000 DL_{2} | — | February 24, 2000 | Višnjan Observatory | K. Korlević, M. Jurić | NYS | 2.8 km | MPC · JPL |
| 50416 | 2000 DZ_{2} | — | February 24, 2000 | Oizumi | T. Kobayashi | TEL | 4.5 km | MPC · JPL |
| 50417 | 2000 DY_{6} | — | February 29, 2000 | Oaxaca | Roe, J. M. | NYS | 2.3 km | MPC · JPL |
| 50418 | 2000 DC_{7} | — | February 29, 2000 | Oizumi | T. Kobayashi | · | 6.6 km | MPC · JPL |
| 50419 | 2000 DL_{7} | — | February 29, 2000 | Oizumi | T. Kobayashi | · | 11 km | MPC · JPL |
| 50420 | 2000 DN_{7} | — | February 29, 2000 | Oizumi | T. Kobayashi | V | 2.3 km | MPC · JPL |
| 50421 | 2000 DD_{9} | — | February 26, 2000 | Kitt Peak | Spacewatch | · | 6.7 km | MPC · JPL |
| 50422 | 2000 DB_{10} | — | February 26, 2000 | Kitt Peak | Spacewatch | HYG | 5.7 km | MPC · JPL |
| 50423 | 2000 DE_{13} | — | February 27, 2000 | Kitt Peak | Spacewatch | · | 2.7 km | MPC · JPL |
| 50424 | 2000 DQ_{13} | — | February 28, 2000 | Kitt Peak | Spacewatch | · | 2.9 km | MPC · JPL |
| 50425 | 2000 DV_{13} | — | February 28, 2000 | Kitt Peak | Spacewatch | NYS | 2.0 km | MPC · JPL |
| 50426 Mikemerrifield | 2000 DJ_{15} | Mikemerrifield | February 26, 2000 | Catalina | CSS | · | 6.1 km | MPC · JPL |
| 50427 Ralphmerrifield | 2000 DT_{15} | Ralphmerrifield | February 26, 2000 | Catalina | CSS | EOS | 5.9 km | MPC · JPL |
| 50428 Alexanderdessler | 2000 DZ_{15} | Alexanderdessler | February 27, 2000 | Catalina | CSS | · | 3.5 km | MPC · JPL |
| 50429 | 2000 DB_{16} | — | February 28, 2000 | Višnjan Observatory | K. Korlević | · | 4.2 km | MPC · JPL |
| 50430 | 2000 DG_{16} | — | February 29, 2000 | Višnjan Observatory | K. Korlević | · | 5.8 km | MPC · JPL |
| 50431 | 2000 DU_{19} | — | February 29, 2000 | Socorro | LINEAR | · | 2.6 km | MPC · JPL |
| 50432 | 2000 DB_{20} | — | February 29, 2000 | Socorro | LINEAR | · | 2.2 km | MPC · JPL |
| 50433 | 2000 DC_{22} | — | February 29, 2000 | Socorro | LINEAR | · | 6.4 km | MPC · JPL |
| 50434 | 2000 DG_{23} | — | February 29, 2000 | Socorro | LINEAR | · | 2.9 km | MPC · JPL |
| 50435 | 2000 DH_{23} | — | February 29, 2000 | Socorro | LINEAR | EUN | 3.0 km | MPC · JPL |
| 50436 | 2000 DK_{23} | — | February 29, 2000 | Socorro | LINEAR | (17392) | 4.3 km | MPC · JPL |
| 50437 | 2000 DX_{23} | — | February 29, 2000 | Socorro | LINEAR | · | 6.4 km | MPC · JPL |
| 50438 | 2000 DZ_{24} | — | February 29, 2000 | Socorro | LINEAR | · | 2.4 km | MPC · JPL |
| 50439 | 2000 DW_{26} | — | February 29, 2000 | Socorro | LINEAR | PAD | 3.7 km | MPC · JPL |
| 50440 | 2000 DD_{29} | — | February 29, 2000 | Socorro | LINEAR | · | 4.6 km | MPC · JPL |
| 50441 | 2000 DD_{30} | — | February 29, 2000 | Socorro | LINEAR | · | 3.7 km | MPC · JPL |
| 50442 | 2000 DL_{32} | — | February 29, 2000 | Socorro | LINEAR | ADE | 7.0 km | MPC · JPL |
| 50443 | 2000 DO_{32} | — | February 29, 2000 | Socorro | LINEAR | EOS | 3.6 km | MPC · JPL |
| 50444 | 2000 DG_{34} | — | February 29, 2000 | Socorro | LINEAR | · | 3.1 km | MPC · JPL |
| 50445 | 2000 DH_{35} | — | February 29, 2000 | Socorro | LINEAR | · | 2.1 km | MPC · JPL |
| 50446 | 2000 DD_{36} | — | February 29, 2000 | Socorro | LINEAR | · | 3.0 km | MPC · JPL |
| 50447 | 2000 DQ_{37} | — | February 29, 2000 | Socorro | LINEAR | NYS | 2.6 km | MPC · JPL |
| 50448 | 2000 DZ_{37} | — | February 29, 2000 | Socorro | LINEAR | · | 3.3 km | MPC · JPL |
| 50449 | 2000 DG_{38} | — | February 29, 2000 | Socorro | LINEAR | NYS | 3.7 km | MPC · JPL |
| 50450 | 2000 DS_{38} | — | February 29, 2000 | Socorro | LINEAR | · | 2.3 km | MPC · JPL |
| 50451 | 2000 DF_{41} | — | February 29, 2000 | Socorro | LINEAR | · | 2.4 km | MPC · JPL |
| 50452 | 2000 DT_{41} | — | February 29, 2000 | Socorro | LINEAR | KOR | 4.0 km | MPC · JPL |
| 50453 | 2000 DJ_{46} | — | February 29, 2000 | Socorro | LINEAR | · | 2.3 km | MPC · JPL |
| 50454 | 2000 DT_{48} | — | February 29, 2000 | Socorro | LINEAR | MAS | 1.4 km | MPC · JPL |
| 50455 | 2000 DX_{52} | — | February 29, 2000 | Socorro | LINEAR | · | 5.8 km | MPC · JPL |
| 50456 | 2000 DW_{53} | — | February 29, 2000 | Socorro | LINEAR | · | 3.8 km | MPC · JPL |
| 50457 | 2000 DZ_{53} | — | February 29, 2000 | Socorro | LINEAR | · | 3.9 km | MPC · JPL |
| 50458 | 2000 DC_{55} | — | February 29, 2000 | Socorro | LINEAR | KOR | 3.5 km | MPC · JPL |
| 50459 | 2000 DZ_{55} | — | February 29, 2000 | Socorro | LINEAR | · | 3.6 km | MPC · JPL |
| 50460 | 2000 DK_{56} | — | February 29, 2000 | Socorro | LINEAR | · | 10 km | MPC · JPL |
| 50461 | 2000 DZ_{58} | — | February 29, 2000 | Socorro | LINEAR | · | 9.1 km | MPC · JPL |
| 50462 | 2000 DU_{60} | — | February 29, 2000 | Socorro | LINEAR | THM | 9.5 km | MPC · JPL |
| 50463 | 2000 DF_{63} | — | February 29, 2000 | Socorro | LINEAR | · | 3.6 km | MPC · JPL |
| 50464 | 2000 DT_{63} | — | February 29, 2000 | Socorro | LINEAR | · | 3.3 km | MPC · JPL |
| 50465 | 2000 DW_{64} | — | February 29, 2000 | Socorro | LINEAR | · | 3.3 km | MPC · JPL |
| 50466 | 2000 DA_{66} | — | February 29, 2000 | Socorro | LINEAR | NYS | 3.6 km | MPC · JPL |
| 50467 | 2000 DU_{66} | — | February 29, 2000 | Socorro | LINEAR | THM | 6.6 km | MPC · JPL |
| 50468 | 2000 DA_{69} | — | February 29, 2000 | Socorro | LINEAR | · | 4.2 km | MPC · JPL |
| 50469 | 2000 DL_{69} | — | February 29, 2000 | Socorro | LINEAR | NYS | 2.4 km | MPC · JPL |
| 50470 | 2000 DQ_{69} | — | February 29, 2000 | Socorro | LINEAR | · | 2.0 km | MPC · JPL |
| 50471 | 2000 DT_{69} | — | February 29, 2000 | Socorro | LINEAR | MAS | 1.9 km | MPC · JPL |
| 50472 | 2000 DH_{71} | — | February 29, 2000 | Socorro | LINEAR | · | 1.8 km | MPC · JPL |
| 50473 | 2000 DB_{72} | — | February 29, 2000 | Socorro | LINEAR | · | 5.6 km | MPC · JPL |
| 50474 | 2000 DY_{72} | — | February 29, 2000 | Socorro | LINEAR | · | 2.8 km | MPC · JPL |
| 50475 | 2000 DQ_{73} | — | February 29, 2000 | Socorro | LINEAR | KOR | 4.0 km | MPC · JPL |
| 50476 | 2000 DT_{73} | — | February 29, 2000 | Socorro | LINEAR | · | 2.9 km | MPC · JPL |
| 50477 | 2000 DE_{74} | — | February 29, 2000 | Socorro | LINEAR | · | 5.7 km | MPC · JPL |
| 50478 | 2000 DN_{74} | — | February 29, 2000 | Socorro | LINEAR | · | 3.7 km | MPC · JPL |
| 50479 | 2000 DR_{74} | — | February 29, 2000 | Socorro | LINEAR | · | 6.6 km | MPC · JPL |
| 50480 | 2000 DU_{74} | — | February 29, 2000 | Socorro | LINEAR | · | 4.4 km | MPC · JPL |
| 50481 | 2000 DD_{75} | — | February 29, 2000 | Socorro | LINEAR | · | 4.7 km | MPC · JPL |
| 50482 | 2000 DF_{75} | — | February 29, 2000 | Socorro | LINEAR | · | 6.7 km | MPC · JPL |
| 50483 | 2000 DR_{79} | — | February 28, 2000 | Socorro | LINEAR | · | 3.7 km | MPC · JPL |
| 50484 | 2000 DB_{83} | — | February 28, 2000 | Socorro | LINEAR | · | 3.3 km | MPC · JPL |
| 50485 | 2000 DX_{83} | — | February 28, 2000 | Socorro | LINEAR | · | 5.5 km | MPC · JPL |
| 50486 | 2000 DY_{84} | — | February 29, 2000 | Socorro | LINEAR | · | 2.3 km | MPC · JPL |
| 50487 | 2000 DH_{85} | — | February 29, 2000 | Socorro | LINEAR | V | 1.8 km | MPC · JPL |
| 50488 | 2000 DA_{86} | — | February 29, 2000 | Socorro | LINEAR | V | 2.5 km | MPC · JPL |
| 50489 | 2000 DY_{87} | — | February 29, 2000 | Socorro | LINEAR | · | 3.8 km | MPC · JPL |
| 50490 | 2000 DO_{88} | — | February 29, 2000 | Socorro | LINEAR | PHO | 1.9 km | MPC · JPL |
| 50491 | 2000 DL_{92} | — | February 27, 2000 | Kitt Peak | Spacewatch | · | 5.2 km | MPC · JPL |
| 50492 | 2000 DB_{93} | — | February 28, 2000 | Socorro | LINEAR | NYS | 2.6 km | MPC · JPL |
| 50493 | 2000 DL_{93} | — | February 28, 2000 | Socorro | LINEAR | KOR | 3.0 km | MPC · JPL |
| 50494 | 2000 DM_{93} | — | February 28, 2000 | Socorro | LINEAR | · | 2.9 km | MPC · JPL |
| 50495 | 2000 DU_{93} | — | February 28, 2000 | Socorro | LINEAR | DOR | 11 km | MPC · JPL |
| 50496 | 2000 DA_{94} | — | February 28, 2000 | Socorro | LINEAR | · | 4.2 km | MPC · JPL |
| 50497 | 2000 DO_{94} | — | February 28, 2000 | Socorro | LINEAR | · | 2.8 km | MPC · JPL |
| 50498 | 2000 DU_{95} | — | February 28, 2000 | Socorro | LINEAR | · | 6.9 km | MPC · JPL |
| 50499 | 2000 DH_{96} | — | February 29, 2000 | Socorro | LINEAR | · | 5.3 km | MPC · JPL |
| 50500 | 2000 DU_{96} | — | February 29, 2000 | Socorro | LINEAR | MAS | 1.7 km | MPC · JPL |

== 50501–50600 ==
back to top

| Designation | | | Discovery | | | Properties | | Ref |
| Permanent | Provisional | Named after | Date | Site | Discoverer(s) | Category | Diam. | Ref |
|---|---|---|---|---|---|---|---|---|
| 50501 | 2000 DM_{97} | — | February 29, 2000 | Socorro | LINEAR | · | 2.9 km | MPC · JPL |
| 50502 | 2000 DB_{98} | — | February 29, 2000 | Socorro | LINEAR | EOS | 5.1 km | MPC · JPL |
| 50503 | 2000 DG_{98} | — | February 29, 2000 | Socorro | LINEAR | · | 4.7 km | MPC · JPL |
| 50504 | 2000 DJ_{98} | — | February 29, 2000 | Socorro | LINEAR | · | 3.2 km | MPC · JPL |
| 50505 | 2000 DP_{98} | — | February 29, 2000 | Socorro | LINEAR | PAD | 5.6 km | MPC · JPL |
| 50506 | 2000 DV_{99} | — | February 29, 2000 | Socorro | LINEAR | · | 5.0 km | MPC · JPL |
| 50507 | 2000 DW_{99} | — | February 29, 2000 | Socorro | LINEAR | MAR | 4.1 km | MPC · JPL |
| 50508 | 2000 DF_{100} | — | February 29, 2000 | Socorro | LINEAR | · | 6.4 km | MPC · JPL |
| 50509 | 2000 DB_{101} | — | February 29, 2000 | Socorro | LINEAR | · | 2.8 km | MPC · JPL |
| 50510 | 2000 DE_{101} | — | February 29, 2000 | Socorro | LINEAR | EOS | 7.2 km | MPC · JPL |
| 50511 | 2000 DZ_{101} | — | February 29, 2000 | Socorro | LINEAR | · | 3.7 km | MPC · JPL |
| 50512 | 2000 DA_{103} | — | February 29, 2000 | Socorro | LINEAR | · | 3.2 km | MPC · JPL |
| 50513 | 2000 DH_{103} | — | February 29, 2000 | Socorro | LINEAR | · | 3.6 km | MPC · JPL |
| 50514 | 2000 DL_{105} | — | February 29, 2000 | Socorro | LINEAR | · | 3.6 km | MPC · JPL |
| 50515 | 2000 DS_{105} | — | February 29, 2000 | Socorro | LINEAR | · | 4.0 km | MPC · JPL |
| 50516 | 2000 DL_{106} | — | February 29, 2000 | Socorro | LINEAR | · | 2.9 km | MPC · JPL |
| 50517 | 2000 DK_{109} | — | February 29, 2000 | Socorro | LINEAR | · | 2.7 km | MPC · JPL |
| 50518 | 2000 DL_{109} | — | February 29, 2000 | Socorro | LINEAR | · | 1.4 km | MPC · JPL |
| 50519 | 2000 DG_{110} | — | February 29, 2000 | Socorro | LINEAR | HNS | 3.6 km | MPC · JPL |
| 50520 | 2000 DX_{110} | — | February 28, 2000 | Socorro | LINEAR | (2076) | 3.7 km | MPC · JPL |
| 50521 | 2000 DZ_{110} | — | February 29, 2000 | Socorro | LINEAR | · | 3.7 km | MPC · JPL |
| 50522 | 2000 DU_{111} | — | February 29, 2000 | Socorro | LINEAR | · | 2.7 km | MPC · JPL |
| 50523 | 2000 DQ_{116} | — | February 27, 2000 | Catalina | CSS | · | 4.4 km | MPC · JPL |
| 50524 | 2000 DY_{117} | — | February 27, 2000 | Catalina | CSS | · | 3.1 km | MPC · JPL |
| 50525 | 2000 EQ_{3} | — | March 3, 2000 | Socorro | LINEAR | (5) | 3.0 km | MPC · JPL |
| 50526 | 2000 ET_{5} | — | March 2, 2000 | Kitt Peak | Spacewatch | NYS | 1.8 km | MPC · JPL |
| 50527 | 2000 EE_{6} | — | March 2, 2000 | Kitt Peak | Spacewatch | · | 3.2 km | MPC · JPL |
| 50528 | 2000 EL_{9} | — | March 3, 2000 | Socorro | LINEAR | EUN | 3.6 km | MPC · JPL |
| 50529 | 2000 EC_{10} | — | March 3, 2000 | Socorro | LINEAR | · | 4.3 km | MPC · JPL |
| 50530 | 2000 EP_{10} | — | March 3, 2000 | Socorro | LINEAR | · | 3.5 km | MPC · JPL |
| 50531 | 2000 EZ_{11} | — | March 4, 2000 | Socorro | LINEAR | · | 7.2 km | MPC · JPL |
| 50532 | 2000 EO_{12} | — | March 4, 2000 | Socorro | LINEAR | · | 12 km | MPC · JPL |
| 50533 | 2000 EP_{12} | — | March 4, 2000 | Socorro | LINEAR | EMA | 11 km | MPC · JPL |
| 50534 | 2000 EY_{12} | — | March 4, 2000 | Socorro | LINEAR | GEF | 4.6 km | MPC · JPL |
| 50535 | 2000 EB_{13} | — | March 4, 2000 | Socorro | LINEAR | · | 4.7 km | MPC · JPL |
| 50536 | 2000 EK_{13} | — | March 5, 2000 | Socorro | LINEAR | · | 1.9 km | MPC · JPL |
| 50537 Emilianobiscardi | 2000 EH_{14} | Emilianobiscardi | March 3, 2000 | San Marcello | M. Tombelli, L. Tesi | · | 2.8 km | MPC · JPL |
| 50538 | 2000 EA_{15} | — | March 3, 2000 | Višnjan Observatory | K. Korlević | TEL | 3.9 km | MPC · JPL |
| 50539 | 2000 EM_{15} | — | March 6, 2000 | Farra d'Isonzo | Farra d'Isonzo | · | 3.4 km | MPC · JPL |
| 50540 | 2000 EK_{16} | — | March 3, 2000 | Socorro | LINEAR | · | 1.9 km | MPC · JPL |
| 50541 | 2000 EV_{16} | — | March 3, 2000 | Socorro | LINEAR | · | 4.8 km | MPC · JPL |
| 50542 | 2000 EZ_{16} | — | March 3, 2000 | Socorro | LINEAR | EOS | 6.8 km | MPC · JPL |
| 50543 | 2000 ED_{17} | — | March 3, 2000 | Socorro | LINEAR | · | 5.3 km | MPC · JPL |
| 50544 | 2000 EO_{17} | — | March 4, 2000 | Socorro | LINEAR | · | 3.0 km | MPC · JPL |
| 50545 | 2000 ER_{17} | — | March 4, 2000 | Socorro | LINEAR | · | 5.4 km | MPC · JPL |
| 50546 | 2000 ED_{18} | — | March 4, 2000 | Socorro | LINEAR | · | 4.4 km | MPC · JPL |
| 50547 | 2000 ES_{18} | — | March 5, 2000 | Socorro | LINEAR | NYS | 4.3 km | MPC · JPL |
| 50548 | 2000 EC_{19} | — | March 5, 2000 | Socorro | LINEAR | MAS | 2.0 km | MPC · JPL |
| 50549 | 2000 EV_{19} | — | March 6, 2000 | Socorro | LINEAR | KON | 6.3 km | MPC · JPL |
| 50550 | 2000 EZ_{19} | — | March 7, 2000 | Socorro | LINEAR | EOS | 8.0 km | MPC · JPL |
| 50551 | 2000 EJ_{20} | — | March 3, 2000 | Catalina | CSS | · | 10 km | MPC · JPL |
| 50552 | 2000 EV_{20} | — | March 3, 2000 | Catalina | CSS | · | 6.0 km | MPC · JPL |
| 50553 Dilles | 2000 EL_{21} | Dilles | March 3, 2000 | Catalina | CSS | · | 3.0 km | MPC · JPL |
| 50554 | 2000 EC_{24} | — | March 8, 2000 | Kitt Peak | Spacewatch | slow | 5.7 km | MPC · JPL |
| 50555 | 2000 EF_{24} | — | March 8, 2000 | Kitt Peak | Spacewatch | KOR | 4.1 km | MPC · JPL |
| 50556 | 2000 EQ_{24} | — | March 8, 2000 | Kitt Peak | Spacewatch | · | 5.1 km | MPC · JPL |
| 50557 | 2000 EN_{25} | — | March 8, 2000 | Kitt Peak | Spacewatch | MAS | 1.9 km | MPC · JPL |
| 50558 | 2000 EN_{26} | — | March 4, 2000 | Uccle | E. W. Elst, Taeymans, D. | · | 3.5 km | MPC · JPL |
| 50559 | 2000 EA_{27} | — | March 3, 2000 | Socorro | LINEAR | · | 2.2 km | MPC · JPL |
| 50560 | 2000 EB_{29} | — | March 4, 2000 | Socorro | LINEAR | MAR | 6.9 km | MPC · JPL |
| 50561 | 2000 EB_{30} | — | March 5, 2000 | Socorro | LINEAR | EUN | 3.1 km | MPC · JPL |
| 50562 | 2000 EX_{32} | — | March 5, 2000 | Socorro | LINEAR | · | 2.8 km | MPC · JPL |
| 50563 | 2000 EF_{36} | — | March 5, 2000 | Socorro | LINEAR | · | 4.4 km | MPC · JPL |
| 50564 | 2000 EE_{37} | — | March 8, 2000 | Socorro | LINEAR | · | 4.2 km | MPC · JPL |
| 50565 | 2000 ES_{37} | — | March 8, 2000 | Socorro | LINEAR | KOR | 3.6 km | MPC · JPL |
| 50566 | 2000 EL_{38} | — | March 8, 2000 | Socorro | LINEAR | EOS | 7.2 km | MPC · JPL |
| 50567 | 2000 EN_{38} | — | March 8, 2000 | Socorro | LINEAR | · | 6.8 km | MPC · JPL |
| 50568 | 2000 ES_{38} | — | March 8, 2000 | Socorro | LINEAR | · | 3.2 km | MPC · JPL |
| 50569 | 2000 ET_{38} | — | March 8, 2000 | Socorro | LINEAR | NAE | 8.7 km | MPC · JPL |
| 50570 | 2000 EZ_{38} | — | March 8, 2000 | Socorro | LINEAR | NYS | 1.4 km | MPC · JPL |
| 50571 | 2000 EA_{39} | — | March 8, 2000 | Socorro | LINEAR | · | 2.9 km | MPC · JPL |
| 50572 | 2000 EM_{39} | — | March 8, 2000 | Socorro | LINEAR | AGN | 5.1 km | MPC · JPL |
| 50573 | 2000 EX_{39} | — | March 8, 2000 | Socorro | LINEAR | (5) | 3.5 km | MPC · JPL |
| 50574 | 2000 ED_{40} | — | March 8, 2000 | Socorro | LINEAR | · | 5.6 km | MPC · JPL |
| 50575 | 2000 EL_{40} | — | March 8, 2000 | Socorro | LINEAR | · | 5.0 km | MPC · JPL |
| 50576 | 2000 EP_{40} | — | March 8, 2000 | Socorro | LINEAR | KOR | 5.3 km | MPC · JPL |
| 50577 | 2000 EU_{40} | — | March 8, 2000 | Socorro | LINEAR | · | 5.3 km | MPC · JPL |
| 50578 | 2000 EH_{41} | — | March 8, 2000 | Socorro | LINEAR | · | 3.2 km | MPC · JPL |
| 50579 | 2000 EN_{41} | — | March 8, 2000 | Socorro | LINEAR | · | 3.0 km | MPC · JPL |
| 50580 | 2000 EO_{41} | — | March 8, 2000 | Socorro | LINEAR | · | 4.5 km | MPC · JPL |
| 50581 | 2000 EA_{42} | — | March 8, 2000 | Socorro | LINEAR | · | 4.6 km | MPC · JPL |
| 50582 | 2000 ED_{42} | — | March 8, 2000 | Socorro | LINEAR | HYG | 7.1 km | MPC · JPL |
| 50583 | 2000 EN_{42} | — | March 8, 2000 | Socorro | LINEAR | PAD | 5.7 km | MPC · JPL |
| 50584 | 2000 EK_{43} | — | March 8, 2000 | Socorro | LINEAR | · | 7.2 km | MPC · JPL |
| 50585 | 2000 EL_{43} | — | March 8, 2000 | Socorro | LINEAR | NYS | 2.2 km | MPC · JPL |
| 50586 | 2000 EP_{43} | — | March 8, 2000 | Socorro | LINEAR | · | 2.7 km | MPC · JPL |
| 50587 | 2000 ET_{45} | — | March 9, 2000 | Socorro | LINEAR | KOR | 6.0 km | MPC · JPL |
| 50588 | 2000 EX_{45} | — | March 9, 2000 | Socorro | LINEAR | · | 3.0 km | MPC · JPL |
| 50589 | 2000 ED_{46} | — | March 9, 2000 | Socorro | LINEAR | EOS | 5.6 km | MPC · JPL |
| 50590 | 2000 EO_{46} | — | March 9, 2000 | Socorro | LINEAR | · | 2.9 km | MPC · JPL |
| 50591 | 2000 EQ_{46} | — | March 9, 2000 | Socorro | LINEAR | NYS | 3.1 km | MPC · JPL |
| 50592 | 2000 ES_{46} | — | March 9, 2000 | Socorro | LINEAR | · | 4.2 km | MPC · JPL |
| 50593 | 2000 EU_{46} | — | March 9, 2000 | Socorro | LINEAR | · | 2.1 km | MPC · JPL |
| 50594 | 2000 EV_{46} | — | March 9, 2000 | Socorro | LINEAR | KOR | 3.5 km | MPC · JPL |
| 50595 | 2000 EZ_{46} | — | March 9, 2000 | Socorro | LINEAR | · | 2.6 km | MPC · JPL |
| 50596 | 2000 EV_{47} | — | March 9, 2000 | Socorro | LINEAR | KOR | 5.8 km | MPC · JPL |
| 50597 | 2000 EY_{47} | — | March 9, 2000 | Socorro | LINEAR | · | 4.3 km | MPC · JPL |
| 50598 | 2000 EH_{48} | — | March 9, 2000 | Socorro | LINEAR | · | 4.2 km | MPC · JPL |
| 50599 | 2000 EM_{48} | — | March 9, 2000 | Socorro | LINEAR | HOF | 7.0 km | MPC · JPL |
| 50600 | 2000 ED_{49} | — | March 9, 2000 | Socorro | LINEAR | · | 5.6 km | MPC · JPL |

== 50601–50700 ==
back to top

| Designation | | | Discovery | | | Properties | | Ref |
| Permanent | Provisional | Named after | Date | Site | Discoverer(s) | Category | Diam. | Ref |
|---|---|---|---|---|---|---|---|---|
| 50601 | 2000 EY_{49} | — | March 6, 2000 | Višnjan Observatory | K. Korlević | · | 4.4 km | MPC · JPL |
| 50602 | 2000 EM_{50} | — | March 10, 2000 | Prescott | P. G. Comba | · | 4.8 km | MPC · JPL |
| 50603 | 2000 EK_{54} | — | March 9, 2000 | Kitt Peak | Spacewatch | PAD | 4.1 km | MPC · JPL |
| 50604 | 2000 EZ_{54} | — | March 10, 2000 | Kitt Peak | Spacewatch | · | 10 km | MPC · JPL |
| 50605 | 2000 EJ_{55} | — | March 10, 2000 | Kitt Peak | Spacewatch | (16286) | 5.8 km | MPC · JPL |
| 50606 | 2000 ES_{55} | — | March 5, 2000 | Socorro | LINEAR | fast | 4.5 km | MPC · JPL |
| 50607 | 2000 EE_{56} | — | March 8, 2000 | Socorro | LINEAR | DOR | 11 km | MPC · JPL |
| 50608 | 2000 EL_{56} | — | March 8, 2000 | Socorro | LINEAR | EUN | 3.9 km | MPC · JPL |
| 50609 | 2000 EU_{56} | — | March 8, 2000 | Socorro | LINEAR | PAD · slow | 8.8 km | MPC · JPL |
| 50610 | 2000 EW_{56} | — | March 8, 2000 | Socorro | LINEAR | · | 9.7 km | MPC · JPL |
| 50611 | 2000 EL_{57} | — | March 8, 2000 | Socorro | LINEAR | MAS | 2.0 km | MPC · JPL |
| 50612 | 2000 EZ_{57} | — | March 8, 2000 | Socorro | LINEAR | WIT | 2.6 km | MPC · JPL |
| 50613 | 2000 ER_{58} | — | March 8, 2000 | Socorro | LINEAR | PAD | 6.3 km | MPC · JPL |
| 50614 | 2000 EJ_{59} | — | March 9, 2000 | Socorro | LINEAR | · | 3.2 km | MPC · JPL |
| 50615 | 2000 EG_{60} | — | March 10, 2000 | Socorro | LINEAR | EOS | 5.1 km | MPC · JPL |
| 50616 | 2000 EH_{61} | — | March 10, 2000 | Socorro | LINEAR | · | 2.9 km | MPC · JPL |
| 50617 | 2000 EG_{62} | — | March 10, 2000 | Socorro | LINEAR | · | 7.4 km | MPC · JPL |
| 50618 | 2000 EH_{62} | — | March 10, 2000 | Socorro | LINEAR | · | 2.9 km | MPC · JPL |
| 50619 | 2000 EM_{62} | — | March 10, 2000 | Socorro | LINEAR | KOR | 4.8 km | MPC · JPL |
| 50620 | 2000 ES_{62} | — | March 10, 2000 | Socorro | LINEAR | · | 6.2 km | MPC · JPL |
| 50621 | 2000 EO_{63} | — | March 10, 2000 | Socorro | LINEAR | · | 5.0 km | MPC · JPL |
| 50622 | 2000 ER_{63} | — | March 10, 2000 | Socorro | LINEAR | EUN | 5.0 km | MPC · JPL |
| 50623 | 2000 EC_{65} | — | March 10, 2000 | Socorro | LINEAR | KOR | 4.2 km | MPC · JPL |
| 50624 | 2000 EL_{65} | — | March 10, 2000 | Socorro | LINEAR | · | 3.2 km | MPC · JPL |
| 50625 | 2000 EL_{66} | — | March 10, 2000 | Socorro | LINEAR | THM | 8.9 km | MPC · JPL |
| 50626 | 2000 EY_{67} | — | March 10, 2000 | Socorro | LINEAR | V | 2.0 km | MPC · JPL |
| 50627 | 2000 EZ_{68} | — | March 10, 2000 | Socorro | LINEAR | · | 2.1 km | MPC · JPL |
| 50628 | 2000 EA_{69} | — | March 10, 2000 | Socorro | LINEAR | THM | 7.2 km | MPC · JPL |
| 50629 | 2000 EG_{69} | — | March 10, 2000 | Socorro | LINEAR | KOR | 3.6 km | MPC · JPL |
| 50630 | 2000 EK_{70} | — | March 10, 2000 | Socorro | LINEAR | · | 9.1 km | MPC · JPL |
| 50631 | 2000 EL_{71} | — | March 9, 2000 | Kitt Peak | Spacewatch | NYS | 1.4 km | MPC · JPL |
| 50632 | 2000 EO_{74} | — | March 10, 2000 | Kitt Peak | Spacewatch | · | 3.7 km | MPC · JPL |
| 50633 | 2000 EA_{75} | — | March 11, 2000 | Kitt Peak | Spacewatch | · | 3.4 km | MPC · JPL |
| 50634 | 2000 EO_{75} | — | March 4, 2000 | Socorro | LINEAR | PHO | 3.5 km | MPC · JPL |
| 50635 | 2000 EY_{76} | — | March 5, 2000 | Socorro | LINEAR | V | 1.4 km | MPC · JPL |
| 50636 | 2000 EH_{77} | — | March 5, 2000 | Socorro | LINEAR | · | 3.9 km | MPC · JPL |
| 50637 | 2000 EG_{79} | — | March 5, 2000 | Socorro | LINEAR | · | 4.8 km | MPC · JPL |
| 50638 | 2000 EP_{79} | — | March 5, 2000 | Socorro | LINEAR | KOR | 3.1 km | MPC · JPL |
| 50639 | 2000 EV_{79} | — | March 5, 2000 | Socorro | LINEAR | · | 9.1 km | MPC · JPL |
| 50640 | 2000 EX_{79} | — | March 5, 2000 | Socorro | LINEAR | · | 2.0 km | MPC · JPL |
| 50641 | 2000 EM_{84} | — | March 6, 2000 | Socorro | LINEAR | · | 5.5 km | MPC · JPL |
| 50642 | 2000 EK_{86} | — | March 8, 2000 | Socorro | LINEAR | · | 3.6 km | MPC · JPL |
| 50643 | 2000 EU_{86} | — | March 8, 2000 | Socorro | LINEAR | · | 3.1 km | MPC · JPL |
| 50644 | 2000 EP_{87} | — | March 8, 2000 | Socorro | LINEAR | NYS | 3.1 km | MPC · JPL |
| 50645 | 2000 EQ_{87} | — | March 8, 2000 | Socorro | LINEAR | · | 11 km | MPC · JPL |
| 50646 | 2000 EA_{88} | — | March 9, 2000 | Socorro | LINEAR | · | 3.5 km | MPC · JPL |
| 50647 | 2000 EN_{88} | — | March 9, 2000 | Socorro | LINEAR | EOS · slow | 6.0 km | MPC · JPL |
| 50648 | 2000 EL_{89} | — | March 9, 2000 | Socorro | LINEAR | KOR | 4.1 km | MPC · JPL |
| 50649 | 2000 EK_{90} | — | March 9, 2000 | Socorro | LINEAR | · | 7.5 km | MPC · JPL |
| 50650 | 2000 EV_{90} | — | March 9, 2000 | Socorro | LINEAR | V | 2.0 km | MPC · JPL |
| 50651 | 2000 EO_{91} | — | March 9, 2000 | Socorro | LINEAR | · | 4.9 km | MPC · JPL |
| 50652 | 2000 ER_{91} | — | March 9, 2000 | Socorro | LINEAR | · | 5.8 km | MPC · JPL |
| 50653 | 2000 EV_{92} | — | March 9, 2000 | Socorro | LINEAR | · | 5.7 km | MPC · JPL |
| 50654 | 2000 EH_{93} | — | March 9, 2000 | Socorro | LINEAR | · | 5.6 km | MPC · JPL |
| 50655 | 2000 EL_{94} | — | March 9, 2000 | Socorro | LINEAR | EUN | 4.7 km | MPC · JPL |
| 50656 | 2000 EM_{94} | — | March 9, 2000 | Socorro | LINEAR | · | 4.0 km | MPC · JPL |
| 50657 | 2000 EN_{94} | — | March 9, 2000 | Socorro | LINEAR | · | 7.0 km | MPC · JPL |
| 50658 | 2000 ES_{94} | — | March 9, 2000 | Socorro | LINEAR | (5) | 3.5 km | MPC · JPL |
| 50659 | 2000 EW_{94} | — | March 9, 2000 | Socorro | LINEAR | · | 3.9 km | MPC · JPL |
| 50660 | 2000 EJ_{95} | — | March 9, 2000 | Socorro | LINEAR | · | 6.3 km | MPC · JPL |
| 50661 | 2000 EN_{95} | — | March 10, 2000 | Socorro | LINEAR | LIX | 11 km | MPC · JPL |
| 50662 | 2000 EG_{97} | — | March 10, 2000 | Socorro | LINEAR | · | 3.6 km | MPC · JPL |
| 50663 | 2000 EY_{102} | — | March 8, 2000 | Socorro | LINEAR | · | 3.3 km | MPC · JPL |
| 50664 | 2000 EY_{103} | — | March 14, 2000 | Socorro | LINEAR | · | 6.2 km | MPC · JPL |
| 50665 | 2000 EK_{104} | — | March 14, 2000 | Višnjan Observatory | K. Korlević | · | 12 km | MPC · JPL |
| 50666 | 2000 EQ_{104} | — | March 13, 2000 | Socorro | LINEAR | · | 5.8 km | MPC · JPL |
| 50667 | 2000 ES_{104} | — | March 13, 2000 | Socorro | LINEAR | · | 3.3 km | MPC · JPL |
| 50668 | 2000 EO_{105} | — | March 11, 2000 | Anderson Mesa | LONEOS | EOS | 7.9 km | MPC · JPL |
| 50669 | 2000 ES_{105} | — | March 11, 2000 | Anderson Mesa | LONEOS | · | 4.6 km | MPC · JPL |
| 50670 | 2000 EY_{105} | — | March 11, 2000 | Anderson Mesa | LONEOS | V | 1.8 km | MPC · JPL |
| 50671 | 2000 EL_{107} | — | March 8, 2000 | Socorro | LINEAR | · | 4.5 km | MPC · JPL |
| 50672 | 2000 EN_{107} | — | March 8, 2000 | Socorro | LINEAR | RAF | 4.0 km | MPC · JPL |
| 50673 | 2000 EQ_{107} | — | March 8, 2000 | Socorro | LINEAR | · | 5.3 km | MPC · JPL |
| 50674 | 2000 ES_{107} | — | March 8, 2000 | Socorro | LINEAR | · | 5.4 km | MPC · JPL |
| 50675 | 2000 ED_{108} | — | March 8, 2000 | Socorro | LINEAR | · | 5.0 km | MPC · JPL |
| 50676 | 2000 EQ_{108} | — | March 8, 2000 | Haleakala | NEAT | EOS | 5.8 km | MPC · JPL |
| 50677 | 2000 ED_{109} | — | March 8, 2000 | Socorro | LINEAR | EOS | 6.3 km | MPC · JPL |
| 50678 | 2000 EQ_{109} | — | March 8, 2000 | Haleakala | NEAT | GEF | 3.1 km | MPC · JPL |
| 50679 | 2000 EZ_{109} | — | March 8, 2000 | Haleakala | NEAT | · | 2.8 km | MPC · JPL |
| 50680 | 2000 EQ_{110} | — | March 8, 2000 | Haleakala | NEAT | ADE | 5.3 km | MPC · JPL |
| 50681 | 2000 EG_{111} | — | March 8, 2000 | Haleakala | NEAT | DOR | 8.8 km | MPC · JPL |
| 50682 | 2000 EJ_{111} | — | March 8, 2000 | Haleakala | NEAT | · | 11 km | MPC · JPL |
| 50683 | 2000 EN_{111} | — | March 8, 2000 | Haleakala | NEAT | · | 4.4 km | MPC · JPL |
| 50684 | 2000 ER_{111} | — | March 8, 2000 | Haleakala | NEAT | WAT · fast · | 12 km | MPC · JPL |
| 50685 | 2000 EV_{113} | — | March 9, 2000 | Socorro | LINEAR | EOS | 5.6 km | MPC · JPL |
| 50686 | 2000 EZ_{113} | — | March 9, 2000 | Socorro | LINEAR | · | 8.5 km | MPC · JPL |
| 50687 Paultemple | 2000 EC_{117} | Paultemple | March 10, 2000 | Catalina | CSS | · | 4.9 km | MPC · JPL |
| 50688 | 2000 EX_{118} | — | March 11, 2000 | Anderson Mesa | LONEOS | · | 4.7 km | MPC · JPL |
| 50689 | 2000 EJ_{119} | — | March 11, 2000 | Anderson Mesa | LONEOS | EUN | 4.7 km | MPC · JPL |
| 50690 | 2000 ER_{119} | — | March 11, 2000 | Anderson Mesa | LONEOS | MAR | 3.6 km | MPC · JPL |
| 50691 | 2000 ET_{122} | — | March 11, 2000 | Socorro | LINEAR | · | 3.4 km | MPC · JPL |
| 50692 | 2000 EB_{124} | — | March 11, 2000 | Socorro | LINEAR | · | 4.2 km | MPC · JPL |
| 50693 | 2000 EF_{124} | — | March 11, 2000 | Socorro | LINEAR | · | 6.2 km | MPC · JPL |
| 50694 | 2000 EM_{124} | — | March 11, 2000 | Anderson Mesa | LONEOS | · | 7.0 km | MPC · JPL |
| 50695 | 2000 EU_{126} | — | March 11, 2000 | Anderson Mesa | LONEOS | · | 4.0 km | MPC · JPL |
| 50696 | 2000 EX_{127} | — | March 11, 2000 | Anderson Mesa | LONEOS | · | 9.8 km | MPC · JPL |
| 50697 | 2000 EL_{128} | — | March 11, 2000 | Anderson Mesa | LONEOS | NYS | 2.7 km | MPC · JPL |
| 50698 | 2000 EY_{128} | — | March 11, 2000 | Anderson Mesa | LONEOS | · | 4.7 km | MPC · JPL |
| 50699 | 2000 EC_{129} | — | March 11, 2000 | Anderson Mesa | LONEOS | · | 4.4 km | MPC · JPL |
| 50700 | 2000 EM_{129} | — | March 11, 2000 | Anderson Mesa | LONEOS | NYS | 2.7 km | MPC · JPL |

== 50701–50800 ==
back to top

| Designation | | | Discovery | | | Properties | | Ref |
| Permanent | Provisional | Named after | Date | Site | Discoverer(s) | Category | Diam. | Ref |
|---|---|---|---|---|---|---|---|---|
| 50701 | 2000 EU_{129} | — | March 11, 2000 | Anderson Mesa | LONEOS | EOS | 5.6 km | MPC · JPL |
| 50702 | 2000 EU_{130} | — | March 11, 2000 | Anderson Mesa | LONEOS | KOR | 7.4 km | MPC · JPL |
| 50703 | 2000 EE_{131} | — | March 11, 2000 | Anderson Mesa | LONEOS | THM | 11 km | MPC · JPL |
| 50704 | 2000 EK_{132} | — | March 11, 2000 | Socorro | LINEAR | V | 2.4 km | MPC · JPL |
| 50705 | 2000 ER_{132} | — | March 11, 2000 | Socorro | LINEAR | AGN | 3.8 km | MPC · JPL |
| 50706 | 2000 EX_{132} | — | March 11, 2000 | Socorro | LINEAR | · | 5.2 km | MPC · JPL |
| 50707 | 2000 EC_{133} | — | March 11, 2000 | Socorro | LINEAR | · | 1.5 km | MPC · JPL |
| 50708 | 2000 EF_{133} | — | March 11, 2000 | Socorro | LINEAR | · | 2.8 km | MPC · JPL |
| 50709 | 2000 EK_{133} | — | March 11, 2000 | Socorro | LINEAR | · | 2.8 km | MPC · JPL |
| 50710 | 2000 EQ_{133} | — | March 11, 2000 | Anderson Mesa | LONEOS | EOS | 5.5 km | MPC · JPL |
| 50711 | 2000 ER_{134} | — | March 11, 2000 | Anderson Mesa | LONEOS | · | 3.1 km | MPC · JPL |
| 50712 | 2000 EV_{134} | — | March 11, 2000 | Anderson Mesa | LONEOS | · | 7.3 km | MPC · JPL |
| 50713 | 2000 EZ_{135} | — | March 11, 2000 | Anderson Mesa | LONEOS | PHO | 4.1 km | MPC · JPL |
| 50714 | 2000 ER_{136} | — | March 12, 2000 | Socorro | LINEAR | (5) | 3.0 km | MPC · JPL |
| 50715 | 2000 EV_{136} | — | March 12, 2000 | Socorro | LINEAR | KOR | 3.4 km | MPC · JPL |
| 50716 | 2000 ED_{137} | — | March 12, 2000 | Socorro | LINEAR | HYG | 7.9 km | MPC · JPL |
| 50717 Jimfox | 2000 EN_{138} | Jimfox | March 11, 2000 | Catalina | CSS | · | 12 km | MPC · JPL |
| 50718 Timrobertson | 2000 ED_{139} | Timrobertson | March 11, 2000 | Catalina | CSS | EUN · slow | 3.9 km | MPC · JPL |
| 50719 Elizabethgriffin | 2000 EG_{140} | Elizabethgriffin | March 1, 2000 | Catalina | CSS | MAR · slow | 3.3 km | MPC · JPL |
| 50720 | 2000 EM_{140} | — | March 2, 2000 | Kitt Peak | Spacewatch | (17392) | 3.4 km | MPC · JPL |
| 50721 Waynebailey | 2000 EU_{141} | Waynebailey | March 2, 2000 | Catalina | CSS | · | 5.3 km | MPC · JPL |
| 50722 Sherlin | 2000 EW_{141} | Sherlin | March 2, 2000 | Catalina | CSS | EOS | 7.6 km | MPC · JPL |
| 50723 Beckley | 2000 EG_{143} | Beckley | March 3, 2000 | Catalina | CSS | EUN | 2.7 km | MPC · JPL |
| 50724 Elizabethbrown | 2000 EK_{145} | Elizabethbrown | March 3, 2000 | Catalina | CSS | (5) | 3.6 km | MPC · JPL |
| 50725 Margarethuggins | 2000 EH_{146} | Margarethuggins | March 4, 2000 | Catalina | CSS | · | 3.0 km | MPC · JPL |
| 50726 Anniemaunder | 2000 EH_{147} | Anniemaunder | March 4, 2000 | Catalina | CSS | AGN | 3.4 km | MPC · JPL |
| 50727 Aliceverett | 2000 EO_{147} | Aliceverett | March 4, 2000 | Catalina | CSS | EOS | 5.3 km | MPC · JPL |
| 50728 Catherinestevens | 2000 ED_{148} | Catherinestevens | March 4, 2000 | Catalina | CSS | · | 7.3 km | MPC · JPL |
| 50729 Fiammetta | 2000 ET_{148} | Fiammetta | March 4, 2000 | Catalina | CSS | NYS | 3.7 km | MPC · JPL |
| 50730 | 2000 EZ_{149} | — | March 5, 2000 | Socorro | LINEAR | EUN | 4.1 km | MPC · JPL |
| 50731 | 2000 EA_{150} | — | March 5, 2000 | Socorro | LINEAR | EUN | 5.4 km | MPC · JPL |
| 50732 | 2000 EJ_{151} | — | March 5, 2000 | Haleakala | NEAT | EUN | 3.3 km | MPC · JPL |
| 50733 | 2000 EV_{152} | — | March 6, 2000 | Haleakala | NEAT | · | 1.8 km | MPC · JPL |
| 50734 | 2000 EP_{153} | — | March 6, 2000 | Haleakala | NEAT | MAR | 3.1 km | MPC · JPL |
| 50735 | 2000 ER_{153} | — | March 6, 2000 | Haleakala | NEAT | · | 3.3 km | MPC · JPL |
| 50736 | 2000 EA_{154} | — | March 6, 2000 | Haleakala | NEAT | · | 5.1 km | MPC · JPL |
| 50737 | 2000 EB_{154} | — | March 6, 2000 | Haleakala | NEAT | · | 7.0 km | MPC · JPL |
| 50738 | 2000 EA_{155} | — | March 9, 2000 | Socorro | LINEAR | · | 4.0 km | MPC · JPL |
| 50739 Gracecook | 2000 EY_{156} | Gracecook | March 11, 2000 | Catalina | CSS | EUN | 4.8 km | MPC · JPL |
| 50740 | 2000 EO_{157} | — | March 12, 2000 | Anderson Mesa | LONEOS | · | 9.9 km | MPC · JPL |
| 50741 | 2000 EW_{157} | — | March 12, 2000 | Anderson Mesa | LONEOS | ERI | 2.6 km | MPC · JPL |
| 50742 | 2000 EZ_{158} | — | March 12, 2000 | Anderson Mesa | LONEOS | EUN | 3.7 km | MPC · JPL |
| 50743 | 2000 EL_{163} | — | March 3, 2000 | Socorro | LINEAR | · | 4.4 km | MPC · JPL |
| 50744 | 2000 EL_{164} | — | March 3, 2000 | Socorro | LINEAR | DOR | 6.0 km | MPC · JPL |
| 50745 | 2000 ET_{165} | — | March 3, 2000 | Socorro | LINEAR | KOR | 4.2 km | MPC · JPL |
| 50746 | 2000 EJ_{170} | — | March 5, 2000 | Socorro | LINEAR | EOS | 7.6 km | MPC · JPL |
| 50747 | 2000 EL_{170} | — | March 5, 2000 | Socorro | LINEAR | · | 8.2 km | MPC · JPL |
| 50748 | 2000 ED_{171} | — | March 5, 2000 | Socorro | LINEAR | EUN | 3.2 km | MPC · JPL |
| 50749 | 2000 EL_{171} | — | March 5, 2000 | Socorro | LINEAR | EOS | 5.8 km | MPC · JPL |
| 50750 | 2000 EU_{171} | — | March 5, 2000 | Socorro | LINEAR | · | 4.3 km | MPC · JPL |
| 50751 | 2000 EL_{173} | — | March 4, 2000 | Socorro | LINEAR | · | 3.7 km | MPC · JPL |
| 50752 | 2000 EA_{174} | — | March 4, 2000 | Socorro | LINEAR | · | 6.4 km | MPC · JPL |
| 50753 Maryblagg | 2000 EO_{177} | Maryblagg | March 3, 2000 | Catalina | CSS | EUN | 3.5 km | MPC · JPL |
| 50754 | 2000 EW_{178} | — | March 4, 2000 | Socorro | LINEAR | MAR | 3.5 km | MPC · JPL |
| 50755 | 2000 EQ_{181} | — | March 4, 2000 | Socorro | LINEAR | · | 2.4 km | MPC · JPL |
| 50756 | 2000 ET_{181} | — | March 4, 2000 | Socorro | LINEAR | slow | 8.2 km | MPC · JPL |
| 50757 | 2000 EA_{183} | — | March 5, 2000 | Socorro | LINEAR | TEL | 4.1 km | MPC · JPL |
| 50758 | 2000 EB_{183} | — | March 5, 2000 | Socorro | LINEAR | TIR | 10 km | MPC · JPL |
| 50759 | 2000 EF_{183} | — | March 5, 2000 | Socorro | LINEAR | · | 3.5 km | MPC · JPL |
| 50760 | 2000 ER_{183} | — | March 5, 2000 | Socorro | LINEAR | · | 5.1 km | MPC · JPL |
| 50761 | 2000 EZ_{183} | — | March 5, 2000 | Socorro | LINEAR | · | 8.0 km | MPC · JPL |
| 50762 | 2000 EY_{184} | — | March 5, 2000 | Socorro | LINEAR | · | 4.7 km | MPC · JPL |
| 50763 | 2000 EV_{185} | — | March 1, 2000 | Kitt Peak | Spacewatch | · | 2.3 km | MPC · JPL |
| 50764 | 2000 EZ_{185} | — | March 1, 2000 | Kitt Peak | Spacewatch | · | 1.9 km | MPC · JPL |
| 50765 | 2000 FM | — | March 25, 2000 | Oizumi | T. Kobayashi | · | 3.5 km | MPC · JPL |
| 50766 | 2000 FA_{2} | — | March 25, 2000 | Kitt Peak | Spacewatch | · | 5.0 km | MPC · JPL |
| 50767 | 2000 FV_{2} | — | March 27, 2000 | Farpoint | G. Hug | · | 4.6 km | MPC · JPL |
| 50768 Ianwessen | 2000 FW_{2} | Ianwessen | March 27, 2000 | Farpoint | G. Hug | · | 4.1 km | MPC · JPL |
| 50769 | 2000 FH_{3} | — | March 28, 2000 | Socorro | LINEAR | ADE | 7.7 km | MPC · JPL |
| 50770 | 2000 FE_{5} | — | March 29, 2000 | Oizumi | T. Kobayashi | · | 4.2 km | MPC · JPL |
| 50771 | 2000 FH_{5} | — | March 29, 2000 | Oizumi | T. Kobayashi | CLO | 6.2 km | MPC · JPL |
| 50772 | 2000 FQ_{8} | — | March 29, 2000 | Kitt Peak | Spacewatch | KOR | 3.3 km | MPC · JPL |
| 50773 | 2000 FG_{12} | — | March 28, 2000 | Socorro | LINEAR | EUN | 3.5 km | MPC · JPL |
| 50774 | 2000 FK_{12} | — | March 28, 2000 | Socorro | LINEAR | · | 2.6 km | MPC · JPL |
| 50775 | 2000 FQ_{12} | — | March 28, 2000 | Socorro | LINEAR | EOS | 4.8 km | MPC · JPL |
| 50776 | 2000 FS_{12} | — | March 28, 2000 | Socorro | LINEAR | EUN | 4.8 km | MPC · JPL |
| 50777 | 2000 FL_{13} | — | March 29, 2000 | Socorro | LINEAR | MAR | 4.1 km | MPC · JPL |
| 50778 | 2000 FZ_{15} | — | March 28, 2000 | Socorro | LINEAR | · | 2.5 km | MPC · JPL |
| 50779 | 2000 FA_{16} | — | March 28, 2000 | Socorro | LINEAR | PAD | 5.7 km | MPC · JPL |
| 50780 | 2000 FE_{16} | — | March 28, 2000 | Socorro | LINEAR | EOS | 5.7 km | MPC · JPL |
| 50781 | 2000 FO_{16} | — | March 28, 2000 | Socorro | LINEAR | · | 5.3 km | MPC · JPL |
| 50782 | 2000 FU_{16} | — | March 28, 2000 | Socorro | LINEAR | · | 3.4 km | MPC · JPL |
| 50783 | 2000 FE_{17} | — | March 28, 2000 | Socorro | LINEAR | · | 4.5 km | MPC · JPL |
| 50784 | 2000 FF_{17} | — | March 28, 2000 | Socorro | LINEAR | · | 8.1 km | MPC · JPL |
| 50785 | 2000 FS_{18} | — | March 29, 2000 | Socorro | LINEAR | ADE | 7.2 km | MPC · JPL |
| 50786 | 2000 FY_{19} | — | March 29, 2000 | Socorro | LINEAR | EOS | 7.3 km | MPC · JPL |
| 50787 | 2000 FP_{20} | — | March 29, 2000 | Socorro | LINEAR | · | 3.7 km | MPC · JPL |
| 50788 | 2000 FB_{21} | — | March 29, 2000 | Socorro | LINEAR | · | 5.9 km | MPC · JPL |
| 50789 | 2000 FJ_{21} | — | March 29, 2000 | Socorro | LINEAR | · | 4.5 km | MPC · JPL |
| 50790 | 2000 FZ_{21} | — | March 29, 2000 | Socorro | LINEAR | EOS | 6.1 km | MPC · JPL |
| 50791 | 2000 FY_{22} | — | March 29, 2000 | Socorro | LINEAR | ADE | 6.5 km | MPC · JPL |
| 50792 | 2000 FZ_{22} | — | March 29, 2000 | Socorro | LINEAR | slow | 3.5 km | MPC · JPL |
| 50793 | 2000 FF_{23} | — | March 29, 2000 | Socorro | LINEAR | GEF | 3.6 km | MPC · JPL |
| 50794 | 2000 FH_{24} | — | March 29, 2000 | Socorro | LINEAR | · | 4.3 km | MPC · JPL |
| 50795 | 2000 FW_{24} | — | March 29, 2000 | Socorro | LINEAR | EUN | 4.5 km | MPC · JPL |
| 50796 | 2000 FS_{25} | — | March 27, 2000 | Anderson Mesa | LONEOS | · | 9.3 km | MPC · JPL |
| 50797 | 2000 FH_{26} | — | March 27, 2000 | Anderson Mesa | LONEOS | KOR | 3.8 km | MPC · JPL |
| 50798 | 2000 FL_{26} | — | March 27, 2000 | Anderson Mesa | LONEOS | · | 5.2 km | MPC · JPL |
| 50799 | 2000 FQ_{26} | — | March 27, 2000 | Anderson Mesa | LONEOS | · | 5.1 km | MPC · JPL |
| 50800 | 2000 FU_{26} | — | March 27, 2000 | Anderson Mesa | LONEOS | · | 5.1 km | MPC · JPL |

== 50801–50900 ==
back to top

| Designation | | | Discovery | | | Properties | | Ref |
| Permanent | Provisional | Named after | Date | Site | Discoverer(s) | Category | Diam. | Ref |
|---|---|---|---|---|---|---|---|---|
| 50801 | 2000 FA_{27} | — | March 27, 2000 | Anderson Mesa | LONEOS | EOS | 4.6 km | MPC · JPL |
| 50802 | 2000 FH_{27} | — | March 27, 2000 | Anderson Mesa | LONEOS | KOR | 3.9 km | MPC · JPL |
| 50803 | 2000 FP_{27} | — | March 27, 2000 | Anderson Mesa | LONEOS | EUN | 3.1 km | MPC · JPL |
| 50804 | 2000 FC_{28} | — | March 27, 2000 | Anderson Mesa | LONEOS | · | 3.7 km | MPC · JPL |
| 50805 | 2000 FF_{28} | — | March 27, 2000 | Anderson Mesa | LONEOS | · | 5.3 km | MPC · JPL |
| 50806 | 2000 FH_{28} | — | March 27, 2000 | Anderson Mesa | LONEOS | · | 6.3 km | MPC · JPL |
| 50807 | 2000 FJ_{28} | — | March 27, 2000 | Anderson Mesa | LONEOS | · | 7.8 km | MPC · JPL |
| 50808 | 2000 FK_{28} | — | March 27, 2000 | Anderson Mesa | LONEOS | · | 3.8 km | MPC · JPL |
| 50809 | 2000 FF_{29} | — | March 27, 2000 | Anderson Mesa | LONEOS | · | 8.7 km | MPC · JPL |
| 50810 | 2000 FL_{29} | — | March 27, 2000 | Anderson Mesa | LONEOS | · | 8.2 km | MPC · JPL |
| 50811 | 2000 FZ_{29} | — | March 27, 2000 | Anderson Mesa | LONEOS | KOR | 3.6 km | MPC · JPL |
| 50812 | 2000 FC_{30} | — | March 27, 2000 | Anderson Mesa | LONEOS | · | 3.3 km | MPC · JPL |
| 50813 | 2000 FJ_{30} | — | March 27, 2000 | Anderson Mesa | LONEOS | AGN | 3.4 km | MPC · JPL |
| 50814 | 2000 FO_{30} | — | March 27, 2000 | Anderson Mesa | LONEOS | · | 3.9 km | MPC · JPL |
| 50815 | 2000 FC_{31} | — | March 28, 2000 | Socorro | LINEAR | · | 3.5 km | MPC · JPL |
| 50816 | 2000 FU_{31} | — | March 29, 2000 | Socorro | LINEAR | EUN | 4.3 km | MPC · JPL |
| 50817 | 2000 FB_{32} | — | March 29, 2000 | Socorro | LINEAR | EUN | 4.5 km | MPC · JPL |
| 50818 | 2000 FV_{32} | — | March 29, 2000 | Socorro | LINEAR | V | 2.0 km | MPC · JPL |
| 50819 | 2000 FW_{32} | — | March 29, 2000 | Socorro | LINEAR | · | 2.8 km | MPC · JPL |
| 50820 | 2000 FV_{33} | — | March 29, 2000 | Socorro | LINEAR | · | 4.1 km | MPC · JPL |
| 50821 | 2000 FC_{34} | — | March 29, 2000 | Socorro | LINEAR | · | 3.7 km | MPC · JPL |
| 50822 | 2000 FH_{35} | — | March 29, 2000 | Socorro | LINEAR | · | 6.7 km | MPC · JPL |
| 50823 | 2000 FL_{35} | — | March 29, 2000 | Socorro | LINEAR | · | 7.0 km | MPC · JPL |
| 50824 | 2000 FU_{35} | — | March 29, 2000 | Socorro | LINEAR | PAD | 5.5 km | MPC · JPL |
| 50825 | 2000 FD_{37} | — | March 29, 2000 | Socorro | LINEAR | AGN | 3.9 km | MPC · JPL |
| 50826 | 2000 FE_{37} | — | March 29, 2000 | Socorro | LINEAR | · | 4.6 km | MPC · JPL |
| 50827 | 2000 FN_{37} | — | March 29, 2000 | Socorro | LINEAR | EOS | 5.4 km | MPC · JPL |
| 50828 | 2000 FR_{37} | — | March 29, 2000 | Socorro | LINEAR | · | 2.8 km | MPC · JPL |
| 50829 | 2000 FV_{37} | — | March 29, 2000 | Socorro | LINEAR | EUN | 4.7 km | MPC · JPL |
| 50830 | 2000 FF_{38} | — | March 29, 2000 | Socorro | LINEAR | · | 4.8 km | MPC · JPL |
| 50831 | 2000 FQ_{38} | — | March 29, 2000 | Socorro | LINEAR | · | 5.2 km | MPC · JPL |
| 50832 | 2000 FH_{39} | — | March 29, 2000 | Socorro | LINEAR | KOR | 4.3 km | MPC · JPL |
| 50833 | 2000 FE_{40} | — | March 29, 2000 | Socorro | LINEAR | · | 5.4 km | MPC · JPL |
| 50834 | 2000 FV_{40} | — | March 29, 2000 | Socorro | LINEAR | · | 5.1 km | MPC · JPL |
| 50835 | 2000 FX_{40} | — | March 29, 2000 | Socorro | LINEAR | EUN | 4.8 km | MPC · JPL |
| 50836 | 2000 FG_{41} | — | March 29, 2000 | Socorro | LINEAR | HOF | 6.6 km | MPC · JPL |
| 50837 | 2000 FG_{42} | — | March 29, 2000 | Socorro | LINEAR | · | 5.3 km | MPC · JPL |
| 50838 | 2000 FQ_{42} | — | March 28, 2000 | Socorro | LINEAR | · | 3.1 km | MPC · JPL |
| 50839 | 2000 FJ_{43} | — | March 29, 2000 | Socorro | LINEAR | NAE | 7.7 km | MPC · JPL |
| 50840 | 2000 FQ_{43} | — | March 29, 2000 | Socorro | LINEAR | · | 5.4 km | MPC · JPL |
| 50841 | 2000 FG_{44} | — | March 29, 2000 | Socorro | LINEAR | EUN | 3.9 km | MPC · JPL |
| 50842 | 2000 FL_{44} | — | March 29, 2000 | Socorro | LINEAR | · | 3.3 km | MPC · JPL |
| 50843 | 2000 FS_{44} | — | March 29, 2000 | Socorro | LINEAR | · | 4.4 km | MPC · JPL |
| 50844 | 2000 FU_{44} | — | March 29, 2000 | Socorro | LINEAR | EOS | 5.5 km | MPC · JPL |
| 50845 | 2000 FL_{45} | — | March 29, 2000 | Socorro | LINEAR | · | 7.9 km | MPC · JPL |
| 50846 | 2000 FX_{45} | — | March 29, 2000 | Socorro | LINEAR | · | 2.5 km | MPC · JPL |
| 50847 | 2000 FG_{46} | — | March 29, 2000 | Socorro | LINEAR | EMA · slow | 13 km | MPC · JPL |
| 50848 | 2000 FM_{46} | — | March 29, 2000 | Socorro | LINEAR | · | 5.4 km | MPC · JPL |
| 50849 | 2000 FV_{46} | — | March 29, 2000 | Socorro | LINEAR | · | 3.5 km | MPC · JPL |
| 50850 | 2000 FX_{46} | — | March 29, 2000 | Socorro | LINEAR | · | 6.6 km | MPC · JPL |
| 50851 | 2000 FR_{47} | — | March 29, 2000 | Socorro | LINEAR | · | 2.9 km | MPC · JPL |
| 50852 | 2000 FZ_{47} | — | March 29, 2000 | Socorro | LINEAR | · | 4.6 km | MPC · JPL |
| 50853 | 2000 FC_{50} | — | March 31, 2000 | Socorro | LINEAR | EUN | 3.5 km | MPC · JPL |
| 50854 | 2000 FD_{50} | — | March 31, 2000 | Socorro | LINEAR | EUN | 4.1 km | MPC · JPL |
| 50855 Williamschultz | 2000 FK_{55} | Williamschultz | March 30, 2000 | Catalina | CSS | · | 3.3 km | MPC · JPL |
| 50856 | 2000 FZ_{61} | — | March 26, 2000 | Anderson Mesa | LONEOS | · | 7.7 km | MPC · JPL |
| 50857 | 2000 FP_{62} | — | March 26, 2000 | Anderson Mesa | LONEOS | KOR | 3.9 km | MPC · JPL |
| 50858 | 2000 FC_{64} | — | March 29, 2000 | Socorro | LINEAR | · | 4.5 km | MPC · JPL |
| 50859 | 2000 FR_{64} | — | March 30, 2000 | Socorro | LINEAR | VER | 9.0 km | MPC · JPL |
| 50860 | 2000 FD_{65} | — | March 26, 2000 | Anderson Mesa | LONEOS | EUN · | 4.2 km | MPC · JPL |
| 50861 | 2000 FO_{69} | — | March 27, 2000 | Anderson Mesa | LONEOS | PAD | 6.0 km | MPC · JPL |
| 50862 | 2000 FX_{73} | — | March 26, 2000 | Anderson Mesa | LONEOS | · | 13 km | MPC · JPL |
| 50863 | 2000 GN_{1} | — | April 4, 2000 | Prescott | P. G. Comba | · | 3.9 km | MPC · JPL |
| 50864 | 2000 GM_{2} | — | April 5, 2000 | High Point | D. K. Chesney | EOS | 8.5 km | MPC · JPL |
| 50865 | 2000 GU_{2} | — | April 3, 2000 | Socorro | LINEAR | · | 4.3 km | MPC · JPL |
| 50866 Davidesprizzi | 2000 GX_{3} | Davidesprizzi | April 1, 2000 | Colleverde | V. S. Casulli | EUN · fast? | 6.3 km | MPC · JPL |
| 50867 | 2000 GM_{4} | — | April 4, 2000 | Socorro | LINEAR | · | 2.8 km | MPC · JPL |
| 50868 | 2000 GC_{6} | — | April 4, 2000 | Socorro | LINEAR | · | 5.3 km | MPC · JPL |
| 50869 | 2000 GJ_{8} | — | April 5, 2000 | Socorro | LINEAR | MAS | 1.5 km | MPC · JPL |
| 50870 | 2000 GQ_{8} | — | April 5, 2000 | Socorro | LINEAR | NYS | 2.8 km | MPC · JPL |
| 50871 | 2000 GX_{9} | — | April 5, 2000 | Socorro | LINEAR | KOR | 3.7 km | MPC · JPL |
| 50872 | 2000 GT_{10} | — | April 5, 2000 | Socorro | LINEAR | NYS | 7.3 km | MPC · JPL |
| 50873 | 2000 GQ_{13} | — | April 5, 2000 | Socorro | LINEAR | · | 3.3 km | MPC · JPL |
| 50874 | 2000 GE_{23} | — | April 5, 2000 | Socorro | LINEAR | (5) | 4.1 km | MPC · JPL |
| 50875 | 2000 GG_{24} | — | April 5, 2000 | Socorro | LINEAR | · | 2.8 km | MPC · JPL |
| 50876 | 2000 GV_{24} | — | April 5, 2000 | Socorro | LINEAR | · | 2.9 km | MPC · JPL |
| 50877 | 2000 GF_{29} | — | April 5, 2000 | Socorro | LINEAR | · | 3.9 km | MPC · JPL |
| 50878 | 2000 GC_{31} | — | April 5, 2000 | Socorro | LINEAR | · | 3.8 km | MPC · JPL |
| 50879 | 2000 GT_{32} | — | April 5, 2000 | Socorro | LINEAR | AGN | 3.9 km | MPC · JPL |
| 50880 | 2000 GC_{33} | — | April 5, 2000 | Socorro | LINEAR | · | 6.4 km | MPC · JPL |
| 50881 | 2000 GF_{33} | — | April 5, 2000 | Socorro | LINEAR | · | 3.5 km | MPC · JPL |
| 50882 | 2000 GW_{35} | — | April 5, 2000 | Socorro | LINEAR | · | 4.6 km | MPC · JPL |
| 50883 | 2000 GD_{36} | — | April 5, 2000 | Socorro | LINEAR | · | 3.8 km | MPC · JPL |
| 50884 | 2000 GZ_{37} | — | April 5, 2000 | Socorro | LINEAR | EOS | 4.4 km | MPC · JPL |
| 50885 | 2000 GD_{39} | — | April 5, 2000 | Socorro | LINEAR | · | 2.5 km | MPC · JPL |
| 50886 | 2000 GW_{39} | — | April 5, 2000 | Socorro | LINEAR | · | 6.4 km | MPC · JPL |
| 50887 | 2000 GD_{40} | — | April 5, 2000 | Socorro | LINEAR | HNS | 3.9 km | MPC · JPL |
| 50888 | 2000 GN_{40} | — | April 5, 2000 | Socorro | LINEAR | NYS | 2.1 km | MPC · JPL |
| 50889 | 2000 GO_{40} | — | April 5, 2000 | Socorro | LINEAR | KOR | 3.7 km | MPC · JPL |
| 50890 | 2000 GS_{40} | — | April 5, 2000 | Socorro | LINEAR | · | 4.2 km | MPC · JPL |
| 50891 | 2000 GH_{41} | — | April 5, 2000 | Socorro | LINEAR | KOR | 3.7 km | MPC · JPL |
| 50892 | 2000 GO_{41} | — | April 5, 2000 | Socorro | LINEAR | · | 4.4 km | MPC · JPL |
| 50893 | 2000 GX_{41} | — | April 5, 2000 | Socorro | LINEAR | EOS | 4.4 km | MPC · JPL |
| 50894 | 2000 GA_{42} | — | April 5, 2000 | Socorro | LINEAR | KOR | 4.2 km | MPC · JPL |
| 50895 | 2000 GH_{42} | — | April 5, 2000 | Socorro | LINEAR | · | 4.2 km | MPC · JPL |
| 50896 | 2000 GS_{43} | — | April 5, 2000 | Socorro | LINEAR | KOR | 3.5 km | MPC · JPL |
| 50897 | 2000 GA_{44} | — | April 5, 2000 | Socorro | LINEAR | · | 8.0 km | MPC · JPL |
| 50898 | 2000 GF_{47} | — | April 5, 2000 | Socorro | LINEAR | KOR | 3.7 km | MPC · JPL |
| 50899 | 2000 GM_{47} | — | April 5, 2000 | Socorro | LINEAR | · | 6.2 km | MPC · JPL |
| 50900 | 2000 GK_{48} | — | April 5, 2000 | Socorro | LINEAR | · | 3.5 km | MPC · JPL |

== 50901–51000 ==
back to top

| Designation | | | Discovery | | | Properties | | Ref |
| Permanent | Provisional | Named after | Date | Site | Discoverer(s) | Category | Diam. | Ref |
|---|---|---|---|---|---|---|---|---|
| 50901 | 2000 GR_{48} | — | April 5, 2000 | Socorro | LINEAR | · | 4.1 km | MPC · JPL |
| 50902 | 2000 GJ_{49} | — | April 5, 2000 | Socorro | LINEAR | · | 5.9 km | MPC · JPL |
| 50903 | 2000 GM_{50} | — | April 5, 2000 | Socorro | LINEAR | · | 4.5 km | MPC · JPL |
| 50904 | 2000 GK_{51} | — | April 5, 2000 | Socorro | LINEAR | THM | 6.3 km | MPC · JPL |
| 50905 | 2000 GL_{51} | — | April 5, 2000 | Socorro | LINEAR | · | 5.8 km | MPC · JPL |
| 50906 | 2000 GX_{51} | — | April 5, 2000 | Socorro | LINEAR | · | 6.7 km | MPC · JPL |
| 50907 | 2000 GB_{52} | — | April 5, 2000 | Socorro | LINEAR | ERI | 5.1 km | MPC · JPL |
| 50908 | 2000 GE_{53} | — | April 5, 2000 | Socorro | LINEAR | · | 3.7 km | MPC · JPL |
| 50909 | 2000 GG_{53} | — | April 5, 2000 | Socorro | LINEAR | · | 3.8 km | MPC · JPL |
| 50910 | 2000 GX_{53} | — | April 5, 2000 | Socorro | LINEAR | · | 3.1 km | MPC · JPL |
| 50911 | 2000 GC_{54} | — | April 5, 2000 | Socorro | LINEAR | · | 2.5 km | MPC · JPL |
| 50912 | 2000 GX_{54} | — | April 5, 2000 | Socorro | LINEAR | MRX | 3.0 km | MPC · JPL |
| 50913 | 2000 GD_{56} | — | April 5, 2000 | Socorro | LINEAR | · | 4.2 km | MPC · JPL |
| 50914 | 2000 GE_{56} | — | April 5, 2000 | Socorro | LINEAR | · | 9.2 km | MPC · JPL |
| 50915 | 2000 GG_{56} | — | April 5, 2000 | Socorro | LINEAR | KOR | 5.5 km | MPC · JPL |
| 50916 | 2000 GK_{56} | — | April 5, 2000 | Socorro | LINEAR | · | 4.9 km | MPC · JPL |
| 50917 | 2000 GG_{57} | — | April 5, 2000 | Socorro | LINEAR | · | 3.9 km | MPC · JPL |
| 50918 | 2000 GQ_{57} | — | April 5, 2000 | Socorro | LINEAR | · | 5.5 km | MPC · JPL |
| 50919 | 2000 GX_{57} | — | April 5, 2000 | Socorro | LINEAR | EOS | 5.8 km | MPC · JPL |
| 50920 | 2000 GT_{58} | — | April 5, 2000 | Socorro | LINEAR | · | 4.3 km | MPC · JPL |
| 50921 | 2000 GZ_{58} | — | April 5, 2000 | Socorro | LINEAR | · | 4.1 km | MPC · JPL |
| 50922 | 2000 GM_{59} | — | April 5, 2000 | Socorro | LINEAR | KOR | 5.2 km | MPC · JPL |
| 50923 | 2000 GQ_{60} | — | April 5, 2000 | Socorro | LINEAR | · | 3.8 km | MPC · JPL |
| 50924 | 2000 GC_{61} | — | April 5, 2000 | Socorro | LINEAR | KOR | 4.9 km | MPC · JPL |
| 50925 | 2000 GW_{64} | — | April 5, 2000 | Socorro | LINEAR | EUN · slow | 5.2 km | MPC · JPL |
| 50926 | 2000 GF_{65} | — | April 5, 2000 | Socorro | LINEAR | · | 4.6 km | MPC · JPL |
| 50927 | 2000 GZ_{65} | — | April 5, 2000 | Socorro | LINEAR | · | 8.8 km | MPC · JPL |
| 50928 | 2000 GT_{66} | — | April 5, 2000 | Socorro | LINEAR | · | 4.5 km | MPC · JPL |
| 50929 | 2000 GU_{66} | — | April 5, 2000 | Socorro | LINEAR | · | 4.9 km | MPC · JPL |
| 50930 | 2000 GW_{66} | — | April 5, 2000 | Socorro | LINEAR | EOS | 3.9 km | MPC · JPL |
| 50931 | 2000 GT_{67} | — | April 5, 2000 | Socorro | LINEAR | · | 8.4 km | MPC · JPL |
| 50932 | 2000 GE_{68} | — | April 5, 2000 | Socorro | LINEAR | EUN | 4.3 km | MPC · JPL |
| 50933 | 2000 GR_{68} | — | April 5, 2000 | Socorro | LINEAR | · | 12 km | MPC · JPL |
| 50934 | 2000 GW_{68} | — | April 5, 2000 | Socorro | LINEAR | PAD | 5.1 km | MPC · JPL |
| 50935 | 2000 GX_{68} | — | April 5, 2000 | Socorro | LINEAR | THM | 5.8 km | MPC · JPL |
| 50936 | 2000 GD_{69} | — | April 5, 2000 | Socorro | LINEAR | · | 5.0 km | MPC · JPL |
| 50937 | 2000 GP_{69} | — | April 5, 2000 | Socorro | LINEAR | · | 6.8 km | MPC · JPL |
| 50938 | 2000 GR_{69} | — | April 5, 2000 | Socorro | LINEAR | · | 5.2 km | MPC · JPL |
| 50939 | 2000 GE_{70} | — | April 5, 2000 | Socorro | LINEAR | · | 7.3 km | MPC · JPL |
| 50940 | 2000 GF_{70} | — | April 5, 2000 | Socorro | LINEAR | URS | 10 km | MPC · JPL |
| 50941 | 2000 GL_{71} | — | April 5, 2000 | Socorro | LINEAR | · | 4.0 km | MPC · JPL |
| 50942 | 2000 GR_{71} | — | April 5, 2000 | Socorro | LINEAR | CYB | 10 km | MPC · JPL |
| 50943 | 2000 GW_{71} | — | April 5, 2000 | Socorro | LINEAR | · | 6.0 km | MPC · JPL |
| 50944 | 2000 GA_{72} | — | April 5, 2000 | Socorro | LINEAR | · | 5.1 km | MPC · JPL |
| 50945 | 2000 GJ_{72} | — | April 5, 2000 | Socorro | LINEAR | · | 5.2 km | MPC · JPL |
| 50946 | 2000 GM_{75} | — | April 5, 2000 | Socorro | LINEAR | EOS | 4.5 km | MPC · JPL |
| 50947 | 2000 GN_{75} | — | April 5, 2000 | Socorro | LINEAR | · | 9.1 km | MPC · JPL |
| 50948 | 2000 GX_{75} | — | April 5, 2000 | Socorro | LINEAR | EUN | 2.7 km | MPC · JPL |
| 50949 | 2000 GC_{77} | — | April 5, 2000 | Socorro | LINEAR | · | 4.4 km | MPC · JPL |
| 50950 | 2000 GZ_{77} | — | April 5, 2000 | Socorro | LINEAR | EOS | 4.3 km | MPC · JPL |
| 50951 | 2000 GE_{78} | — | April 5, 2000 | Socorro | LINEAR | EOS | 4.9 km | MPC · JPL |
| 50952 | 2000 GO_{78} | — | April 5, 2000 | Socorro | LINEAR | EOS | 4.4 km | MPC · JPL |
| 50953 | 2000 GA_{79} | — | April 5, 2000 | Socorro | LINEAR | THM | 7.3 km | MPC · JPL |
| 50954 | 2000 GH_{79} | — | April 5, 2000 | Socorro | LINEAR | · | 5.2 km | MPC · JPL |
| 50955 | 2000 GJ_{79} | — | April 5, 2000 | Socorro | LINEAR | · | 3.4 km | MPC · JPL |
| 50956 | 2000 GO_{80} | — | April 6, 2000 | Socorro | LINEAR | · | 4.3 km | MPC · JPL |
| 50957 | 2000 GR_{80} | — | April 6, 2000 | Socorro | LINEAR | CLO | 7.5 km | MPC · JPL |
| 50958 | 2000 GB_{81} | — | April 6, 2000 | Socorro | LINEAR | · | 5.2 km | MPC · JPL |
| 50959 | 2000 GK_{81} | — | April 6, 2000 | Socorro | LINEAR | THM | 8.5 km | MPC · JPL |
| 50960 | 2000 GN_{82} | — | April 9, 2000 | Kleť | Kleť | EOS | 6.2 km | MPC · JPL |
| 50961 | 2000 GD_{83} | — | April 2, 2000 | Socorro | LINEAR | · | 3.2 km | MPC · JPL |
| 50962 | 2000 GB_{84} | — | April 3, 2000 | Socorro | LINEAR | · | 3.0 km | MPC · JPL |
| 50963 | 2000 GT_{84} | — | April 3, 2000 | Socorro | LINEAR | AEG | 8.3 km | MPC · JPL |
| 50964 | 2000 GF_{85} | — | April 3, 2000 | Socorro | LINEAR | EUN | 4.4 km | MPC · JPL |
| 50965 | 2000 GN_{85} | — | April 3, 2000 | Socorro | LINEAR | URS | 11 km | MPC · JPL |
| 50966 | 2000 GZ_{85} | — | April 4, 2000 | Socorro | LINEAR | · | 4.9 km | MPC · JPL |
| 50967 | 2000 GE_{86} | — | April 4, 2000 | Socorro | LINEAR | · | 3.9 km | MPC · JPL |
| 50968 | 2000 GR_{86} | — | April 4, 2000 | Socorro | LINEAR | (5) | 3.1 km | MPC · JPL |
| 50969 | 2000 GO_{87} | — | April 4, 2000 | Socorro | LINEAR | · | 5.5 km | MPC · JPL |
| 50970 | 2000 GT_{87} | — | April 4, 2000 | Socorro | LINEAR | · | 2.3 km | MPC · JPL |
| 50971 | 2000 GP_{88} | — | April 4, 2000 | Socorro | LINEAR | EOS | 6.4 km | MPC · JPL |
| 50972 | 2000 GE_{90} | — | April 4, 2000 | Socorro | LINEAR | · | 6.9 km | MPC · JPL |
| 50973 | 2000 GZ_{90} | — | April 4, 2000 | Socorro | LINEAR | EOS | 5.2 km | MPC · JPL |
| 50974 | 2000 GA_{91} | — | April 4, 2000 | Socorro | LINEAR | EOS | 4.2 km | MPC · JPL |
| 50975 | 2000 GQ_{91} | — | April 4, 2000 | Socorro | LINEAR | EOS | 5.2 km | MPC · JPL |
| 50976 | 2000 GD_{92} | — | April 4, 2000 | Socorro | LINEAR | LUT | 13 km | MPC · JPL |
| 50977 | 2000 GL_{92} | — | April 5, 2000 | Socorro | LINEAR | · | 3.7 km | MPC · JPL |
| 50978 | 2000 GS_{92} | — | April 5, 2000 | Socorro | LINEAR | · | 3.8 km | MPC · JPL |
| 50979 | 2000 GX_{92} | — | April 5, 2000 | Socorro | LINEAR | EOS | 6.3 km | MPC · JPL |
| 50980 | 2000 GE_{93} | — | April 5, 2000 | Socorro | LINEAR | · | 9.2 km | MPC · JPL |
| 50981 | 2000 GL_{93} | — | April 5, 2000 | Socorro | LINEAR | EOS | 6.1 km | MPC · JPL |
| 50982 | 2000 GO_{93} | — | April 5, 2000 | Socorro | LINEAR | slow | 11 km | MPC · JPL |
| 50983 | 2000 GT_{93} | — | April 5, 2000 | Socorro | LINEAR | EOS | 7.8 km | MPC · JPL |
| 50984 | 2000 GY_{93} | — | April 5, 2000 | Socorro | LINEAR | EOS | 4.9 km | MPC · JPL |
| 50985 | 2000 GB_{94} | — | April 5, 2000 | Socorro | LINEAR | EOS | 5.7 km | MPC · JPL |
| 50986 | 2000 GC_{94} | — | April 5, 2000 | Socorro | LINEAR | · | 5.8 km | MPC · JPL |
| 50987 | 2000 GD_{94} | — | April 5, 2000 | Socorro | LINEAR | EOS | 6.4 km | MPC · JPL |
| 50988 | 2000 GF_{94} | — | April 5, 2000 | Socorro | LINEAR | EOS | 4.7 km | MPC · JPL |
| 50989 | 2000 GG_{94} | — | April 5, 2000 | Socorro | LINEAR | EOS | 5.0 km | MPC · JPL |
| 50990 | 2000 GH_{94} | — | April 5, 2000 | Socorro | LINEAR | EOS | 5.0 km | MPC · JPL |
| 50991 | 2000 GK_{94} | — | April 5, 2000 | Socorro | LINEAR | EUN | 3.6 km | MPC · JPL |
| 50992 | 2000 GL_{94} | — | April 5, 2000 | Socorro | LINEAR | · | 4.3 km | MPC · JPL |
| 50993 | 2000 GR_{94} | — | April 5, 2000 | Socorro | LINEAR | · | 4.4 km | MPC · JPL |
| 50994 | 2000 GS_{94} | — | April 5, 2000 | Socorro | LINEAR | EOS | 8.4 km | MPC · JPL |
| 50995 | 2000 GH_{95} | — | April 6, 2000 | Socorro | LINEAR | · | 4.5 km | MPC · JPL |
| 50996 | 2000 GJ_{96} | — | April 6, 2000 | Socorro | LINEAR | HYG | 8.1 km | MPC · JPL |
| 50997 | 2000 GB_{97} | — | April 7, 2000 | Socorro | LINEAR | · | 3.8 km | MPC · JPL |
| 50998 | 2000 GB_{98} | — | April 7, 2000 | Socorro | LINEAR | EOS | 5.6 km | MPC · JPL |
| 50999 | 2000 GH_{98} | — | April 7, 2000 | Socorro | LINEAR | HYG | 6.3 km | MPC · JPL |
| 51000 | 2000 GK_{98} | — | April 7, 2000 | Socorro | LINEAR | ADE | 5.8 km | MPC · JPL |

back to top

== See also ==
- Meanings of minor-planet names: 50001–51000
