= List of named minor planets: 50000–59999 =

This is a partial list of named minor planets in numerical order. It contains a total of 401 entries as of 19 October 2026. Minor planets for which no article exist are displayed in grey color and redirect to the list of minor planets (see List of minor planets § Main index).

== From 50,000 to 59,999 ==
- 50000 Quaoar
- 50033 Perelman
- 50240 Cortina
- 50250 Daveharrington
- 50251 Iorg
- 50252 Dianahannikainen
- 50271 Albertoanunziato
- 50275 Marcocasalini
- 50310 Richardjakiel
- 50401 Richardmeyers
- 50412 Ewen
- 50413 Petrginz
- 50426 Mikemerrifield
- 50427 Ralphmerrifield
- 50428 Alexanderdessler
- 50537 Emilianobiscardi
- 50553 Dilles
- 50687 Paultemple
- 50717 Jimfox
- 50718 Timrobertson
- 50719 Elizabethgriffin
- 50721 Waynebailey
- 50722 Sherlin
- 50723 Beckley
- 50724 Elizabethbrown
- 50725 Margarethuggins
- 50726 Anniemaunder
- 50727 Aliceverett
- 50728 Catherinestevens
- 50729 Fiammetta
- 50739 Gracecook
- 50753 Maryblagg
- 50768 Ianwessen
- 50855 Williamschultz
- 50866 Davidesprizzi
- 51023 Benavidezlozano
- 51166 Huimanto
- 51178 Geraintjones
- 51261 Holuša
- 51406 Massimocalvani
- 51415 Tovinder
- 51419 Deshapriya
- 51430 Ireneclaire
- 51431 Jayardee
- 51529 Marksimpson
- 51569 Garywessen
- 51570 Phendricksen
- 51599 Brittany
- 51655 Susannemond
- 51659 Robohachi
- 51663 Lovelock
- 51741 Davidixon
- 51772 Sparker
- 51823 Rickhusband
- 51824 Mikeanderson
- 51825 Davidbrown
- 51826 Kalpanachawla
- 51827 Laurelclark
- 51828 Ilanramon
- 51829 Williemccool
- 51874 Alessiosquilloni
- 51895 Biblialexa
- 51915 Andry
- 51983 Hönig
- 51985 Kirby
- 52005 Maik
- 52008 Johnnaka
- 52030 Maxvasile
- 52057 Clarkhowell
- 52225 Panchenko
- 52226 Saenredam
- 52228 Protos
- 52231 Sitnik
- 52242 Michelemaoret
- 52246 Donaldjohanson
- 52260 Ureshino
- 52261 Izumishikibu
- 52263 Rustamov
- 52266 Van Flandern
- 52267 Rotarytorino
- 52270 Noamchomsky
- 52271 Lecorbusier
- 52285 Kakurinji
- 52291 Mott
- 52292 Kamdzhalov
- 52293 Mommsen
- 52294 Detlef
- 52295 Köppen
- 52301 Qumran
- 52308 Hanspeterröser
- 52309 Philnicolai
- 52316 Daveslater
- 52334 Oberammergau
- 52337 Compton
- 52341 Ballmann
- 52344 Yehudimenuhin
- 52345 Tabuchikouichi
- 52382 Saitoizumi
- 52384 Elenapanko
- 52387 Huitzilopochtli
- 52402 Yoichihasegawa
- 52421 Daihoji
- 52422 LPL
- 52426 Ritaalessandro
- 52443 Nakagiri
- 52455 Masamika
- 52457 Enquist
- 52480 Enzomora
- 52487 Huazhongkejida
- 52500 Kanata
- 52524 Pikador
- 52558 Pigafetta
- 52570 Lauraco
- 52589 Montviloff
- 52601 Iwayaji
- 52602 Floriansignoret
- 52604 Thomayer
- 52633 Turvey
- 52649 Chrismith
- 52655 Villermaux
- 52665 Brianmay
- 52670 Alby
- 52681 Kelleghan
- 52691 Maryrobinettek
- 52692 Johnscalzi
- 52703 Bernardleblanc
- 52767 Ophelestes
- 52860 Méganediet
- 52872 Okyrhoe
- 52873 Grootaerd
- 52959 Danieladepaulis
- 52963 Vercingetorix
- 52965 Laurencebentz
- 52975 Cyllarus
- 52982 Marieclaire
- 53005 Antibes
- 53025 Willnoel
- 53029 Wodetzky
- 53053 Sabinomaffeo
- 53055 Astrogapra
- 53088 Mauricehirsch
- 53093 La Orotava
- 53109 Martinphillipps
- 53119 Matthiasgoerne
- 53127 Adrienklotz
- 53137 Gabytutty
- 53141 Marcmoniez
- 53157 Akaishidake
- 53159 Mysliveček
- 53237 Simonson
- 53250 Beucher
- 53252 Sardegna
- 53253 Zeiler
- 53256 Sinitiere
- 53258 Kerryannlecky
- 53285 Mojmír
- 53311 Deucalion
- 53316 Michielford
- 53435 Leonard
- 53468 Varros
- 53537 Zhangyun
- 53629 Andrewpotter
- 53640 Marché
- 53817 Gertrudebacon
- 53818 Isispogson
- 53839 Schölkopf
- 53843 Antjiekrog
- 53910 Jánfischer
- 54182 Galsarid
- 54237 Hiroshimanabe
- 54288 Daikikawasaki
- 54362 Restitutum
- 54391 Adammckay
- 54402 Jonathanbradshaw
- 54403 Langersek
- 54411 Bobestelle
- 54439 Topeka
- 54509 YORP
- 54510 Yakagehonjin
- 54521 Aladdin
- 54522 Menaechmus
- 54563 Kinokonasu
- 54564 Kiyoshiizumi
- 54598 Bienor
- 54610 Toichisakata
- 54693 Garymyers
- 54720 Kentstevens
- 54810 Molleigh
- 54820 Svenders
- 54827 Kurpfalz
- 54852 Mercatali
- 54862 Sundaigakuen
- 54863 Gasnault
- 54902 Close
- 54932 Waltharris
- 54963 Sotin
- 54967 Millucci
- 54983 Simone
- 55082 Xlendi
- 55108 Beamueller
- 55112 Mariangela
- 55196 Marchini
- 55212 Yukitoayatsuji
- 55221 Nancynoblitt
- 55222 Makotoshinkai
- 55223 Akiraifukube
- 55276 Kenlarner
- 55319 Takanashi
- 55320 Busler
- 55330 Shekwaihung
- 55331 Putzi
- 55381 Lautakwah
- 55382 Kootinlok
- 55383 Cheungkwokwing
- 55384 Muiyimfong
- 55397 Hackman
- 55399 Jasonsoderblom
- 55418 Bianciardi
- 55419 Astynoos
- 55427 Rosta
- 55428 Cappellaro
- 55477 Soroban
- 55543 Nemeghaire
- 55555 DNA
- 55559 Briancraine
- 55561 Madenberg
- 55565 Aya
- 55576 Amycus
- 55637 Uni
- 55676 Klythios
- 55678 Lampos
- 55701 Ukalegon
- 55702 Thymoitos
- 55720 Daandehoop
- 55733 Lepsius
- 55735 Magdeburg
- 55737 Coquimbo
- 55749 Eulenspiegel
- 55753 Raman
- 55755 Blythe
- 55759 Erdmannsdorff
- 55772 Loder
- 55810 Fabiofazio
- 55815 Melindakim
- 55838 Hagongda
- 55844 Bičák
- 55845 Marco
- 55854 Stoppani
- 55863 Jeffwayne
- 55866 Javiersierra
- 55873 Shiomidake
- 55874 Brlka
- 55875 Hirohatagaoka
- 55891 Jameslequeux
- 55892 Fuzhougezhi
- 55897 Antoinecailleau
- 55901 Xuaoao
- 55913 Alinedupin
- 55987 Maríaruiz
- 56000 Mesopotamia
- 56011 Sarahantier
- 56018 Yujawang
- 56038 Jackmapanje
- 56041 Luciendumont
- 56067 Argerich
- 56073 Poggianti
- 56088 Wuheng
- 56095 Buniatishvili
- 56100 Luisapolli
- 56170 Rolandovillazón
- 56172 Véroniquesanson
- 56280 Asemo
- 56329 Tarxien
- 56361 Marcomontagni
- 56422 Mnajdra
- 56561 Jaimenomen
- 56678 Alicewessen
- 56788 Guilbertlepoutre
- 56795 Amandagorman
- 56957 Seohideaki
- 56975 Lindaspilker
- 57076 Mariocambi
- 57140 Gaddi
- 57359 Robcrawford
- 57424 Caelumnoctu
- 57471 Mariemarsina
- 57509 Sly
- 57561 Gabrielegiuli
- 57567 Crikey
- 57658 Nilrem
- 57868 Pupin
- 57879 Cesarechiosi
- 57901 Hitchens
- 57915 Mahuchikh
- 58084 Hiketaon
- 58095 Oranienstein
- 58096 Oineus
- 58097 Alimov
- 58098 Quirrenbach
- 58145 Gus
- 58152 Natsöderblom
- 58163 Minnesang
- 58164 Reiwanohoshi
- 58184 Masayukiyamamoto
- 58185 Rokkosan
- 58186 Langkavel
- 58191 Dolomiten
- 58196 Ashleyess
- 58214 Amorim
- 58215 von Klitzing
- 58217 Peterhebel
- 58221 Boston
- 58279 Kamerlingh
- 58345 Moomintroll
- 58364 Feierberg
- 58365 Robmedrano
- 58373 Albertoalonso
- 58417 Belzoni
- 58418 Luguhu
- 58424 Jamesdunlop
- 58440 Zdeněkstuchlík
- 58441 Thomastestoni
- 58460 Le Mouélic
- 58466 Santoka
- 58495 Hajin
- 58498 Octaviopaz
- 58499 Stüber
- 58534 Logos
- 58535 Pattillo
- 58569 Eboshiyamakouen
- 58571 Barbaraserf
- 58572 Romanella
- 58573 Serpieri
- 58578 Žídek
- 58579 Ehrenberg
- 58580 Elenacuoghi
- 58595 Joepollock
- 58600 Iwamuroonsen
- 58605 Liutungsheng
- 58606 Charlestrenet
- 58607 Wenzel
- 58608 Geroldrichter
- 58622 Setoguchi
- 58627 Rieko
- 58664 IYAMMIX
- 58671 Diplodocus
- 58672 Remigio
- 58679 Brenig
- 58682 Alenašolcová
- 58683 Jeanmouette
- 58691 Luigisannino
- 58700 Darson
- 58702 Tizianabitossi
- 58707 Kyoshi
- 58709 Zenocolò
- 58714 Boya
- 58734 Jeantarde
- 58736 Karlantier
- 58750 Simonjeanne
- 58756 Malgoyre
- 58782 Suhelahmeti
- 58895 Annierobin
- 58896 Schlosser
- 58931 Palmys
- 58941 Guishida
- 58965 Juliettegréco
- 59000 Beiguan
- 59001 Senftenberg
- 59045 Gérardlemaitre
- 59067 Claudiaangeli
- 59068 Pierrebourget
- 59087 Maccacaro
- 59122 Bienaymé
- 59162 Olivierbienaymé
- 59199 Jorisbossard
- 59211 Bernardfort
- 59232 Sfiligoi
- 59238 Lilin
- 59239 Alhazen
- 59248 Genevièvesoucail
- 59369 Chanco
- 59381 Yannickmellier
- 59384 Tomgiovannetti
- 59388 Monod
- 59389 Oskarvonmiller
- 59390 Habermas
- 59417 Giocasilli
- 59419 Prešov
- 59425 Xuyangsheng
- 59470 Paveltoufar
- 59483 Corranplain
- 59793 Clapiès
- 59797 Píšala
- 59800 Astropis
- 59804 Dickjoyce
- 59828 Ossikar
- 59830 Reynek
- 59833 Danimatter
- 59964 Pierremartin
- 59970 Morate
- 59980 Moza
back to top

== See also ==
- List of minor planet discoverers
- List of observatory codes
- Meanings of minor planet names § Index
