= Laurel Clark =

American astronaut (1961–2003)

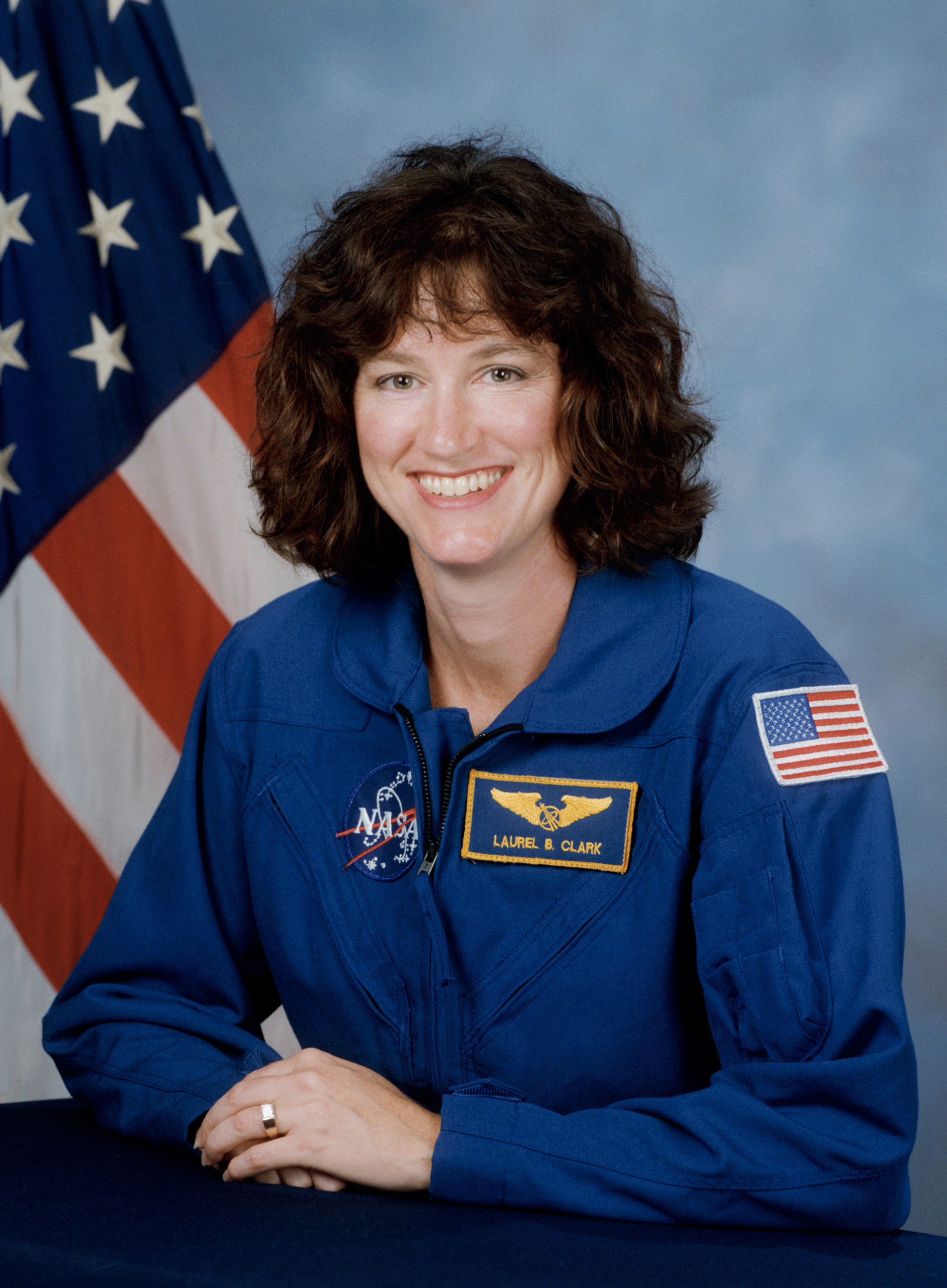
- Clark in 1996
- Born: Laurel Blair Salton; March 10, 1961; Ames, Iowa, U.S.
- Died: February 1, 2003 (aged 41); Over Texas, U.S.
- Cause of death: Space Shuttle Columbia disaster
- Education: University of Wisconsin–Madison (BS, MD)
- Awards: Congressional Space Medal of Honor; NASA Distinguished Service Medal
- Space career

NASA astronaut
- Rank: Captain, USN
- Time in space: 15d 22h 20m
- Selection: NASA Group 16 (1996)
- Missions: STS-107
- Mission insignia

Laurel Blair Clark (née Salton; March 10, 1961 – February 1, 2003) was an American NASA astronaut, medical doctor, United States Navy captain, and Space Shuttle mission specialist. She died along with her six fellow crew members in the Space Shuttle Columbia disaster. Clark was posthumously awarded the Congressional Space Medal of Honor.

== Early life and education ==
Clark was born in Ames, Iowa, but considered Racine, Wisconsin, her hometown. She graduated from William Horlick High School in Racine, Wisconsin in 1979. She enrolled at the University of Wisconsin–Madison, where she received a Bachelor of Science degree in zoology in 1983, and a Doctor of Medicine in 1987. Clark was also a member of the Gamma Phi Beta sorority at the university. She held a Federal Communications Commission (FCC) issued Technician Class amateur radio license with the call sign KC5ZSU.

== Military career ==
During medical school, Clark did active duty training with the Diving Medicine Department at the United States Navy Experimental Diving Unit in March 1987. After completing medical school, she underwent postgraduate medical education in pediatrics from 1987 to 1988 at the National Naval Medical Center. The following year, Clark completed Navy undersea medical officer training at the Naval Undersea Medical Institute in Groton, Connecticut, and diving medical officer training at the Naval Diving and Salvage Training Center in Panama City, Florida. She was designated a Radiation Health Officer and Undersea Medical Officer. Clark was then assigned as the Submarine Squadron 14 Medical Department Head in Holy Loch, Scotland. During that assignment, she dove with Navy divers and Naval Special Warfare Unit Two SEALs and performed many medical evacuations from US submarines. After two years of operational experience, Clark was designated as a Naval Submarine Medical Officer and Diving Medical Officer.

Clark underwent six months of aeromedical training at the Naval Aerospace Medical Institute at NAS Pensacola in Pensacola, Florida, and was designated as a Naval Flight Surgeon. She was stationed at MCAS Yuma, Arizona, and assigned as Flight Surgeon Marine Attack Squadron 211 (VMA-211), a Marine Corps AV-8B Harrier squadron. Clark made several deployments, including one overseas to the Western Pacific, practiced medicine in austere environments, and flew on multiple aircraft. Her squadron won the Marine Attack Squadron of the Year award for its successful deployment. Clark was then assigned as the Group Flight Surgeon for Marine Aircraft Group 13 (MAG-13).

Before her selection as an astronaut candidate, Clark served as a Flight Surgeon for Training Squadron 86 (VT-86), the Naval Flight Officer advanced training squadron for tactical jets at NAS Pensacola. She was Board Certified by the National Board of Medical Examiners and held a Wisconsin Medical License, and her military qualifications included Radiation Health Officer, Undersea Medical Officer, Diving Medical Officer, Submarine Medical Officer, and Naval Flight Surgeon. Clark was also a Basic Life Support Instructor, Advanced Cardiac Life Support Provider, Advanced Trauma Life Support Provider, and Hyperbaric Chamber Advisor. Clark was a member of the Aerospace Medical Association and the Society of U.S. Naval Flight Surgeons.

== NASA career ==
Selected by NASA in April 1996, Clark reported to the Johnson Space Center in Houston, Texas, in August 1996. After completing two years of training and evaluation, she was qualified for flight assignment as a mission specialist. From July 1997 to August 2000, Clark worked in the Astronaut Office Payloads/Habitability Branch. She flew aboard STS-107, logging 15 days, 22 hours and 21 minutes in space.

=== Space flight experience ===
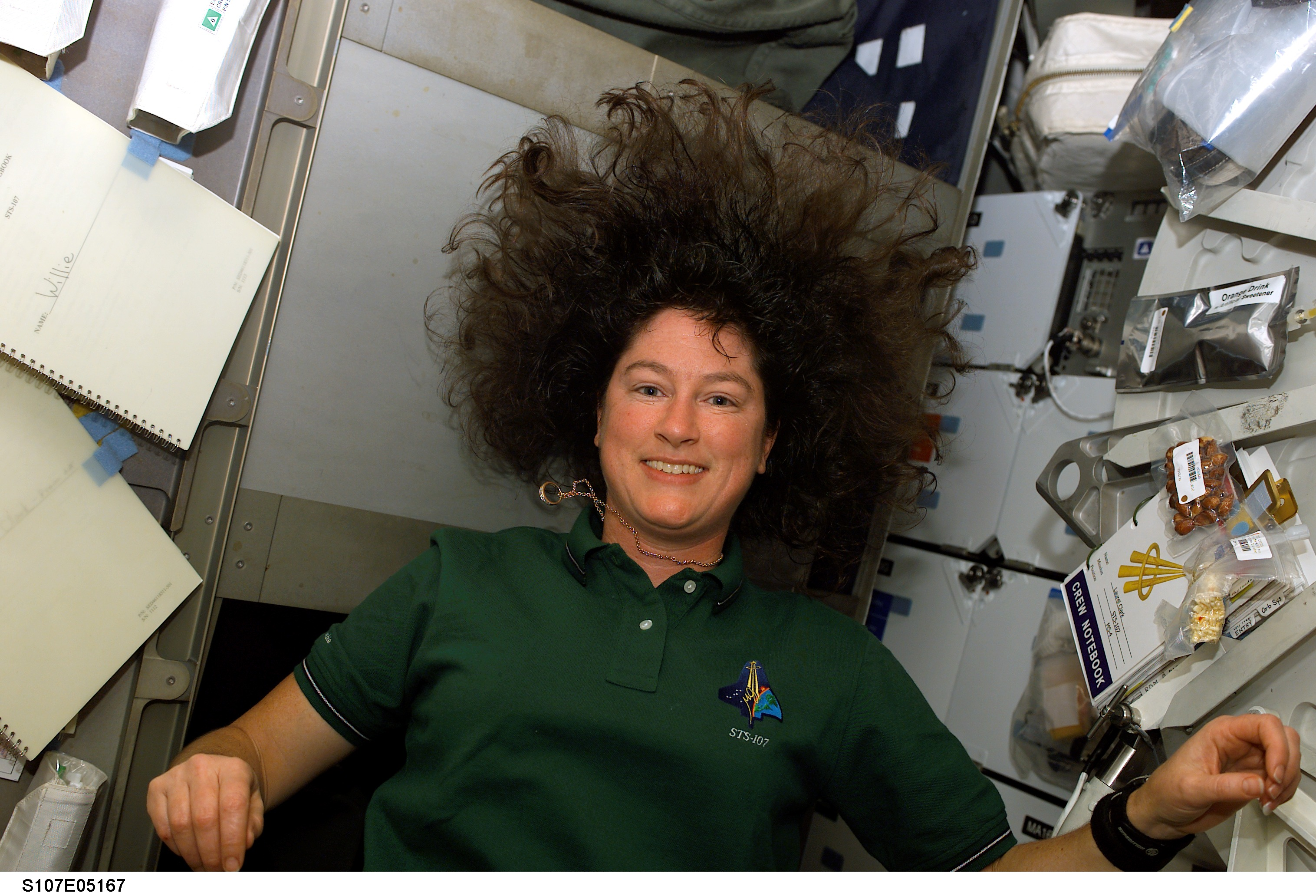
Laurel Clark during STS-107

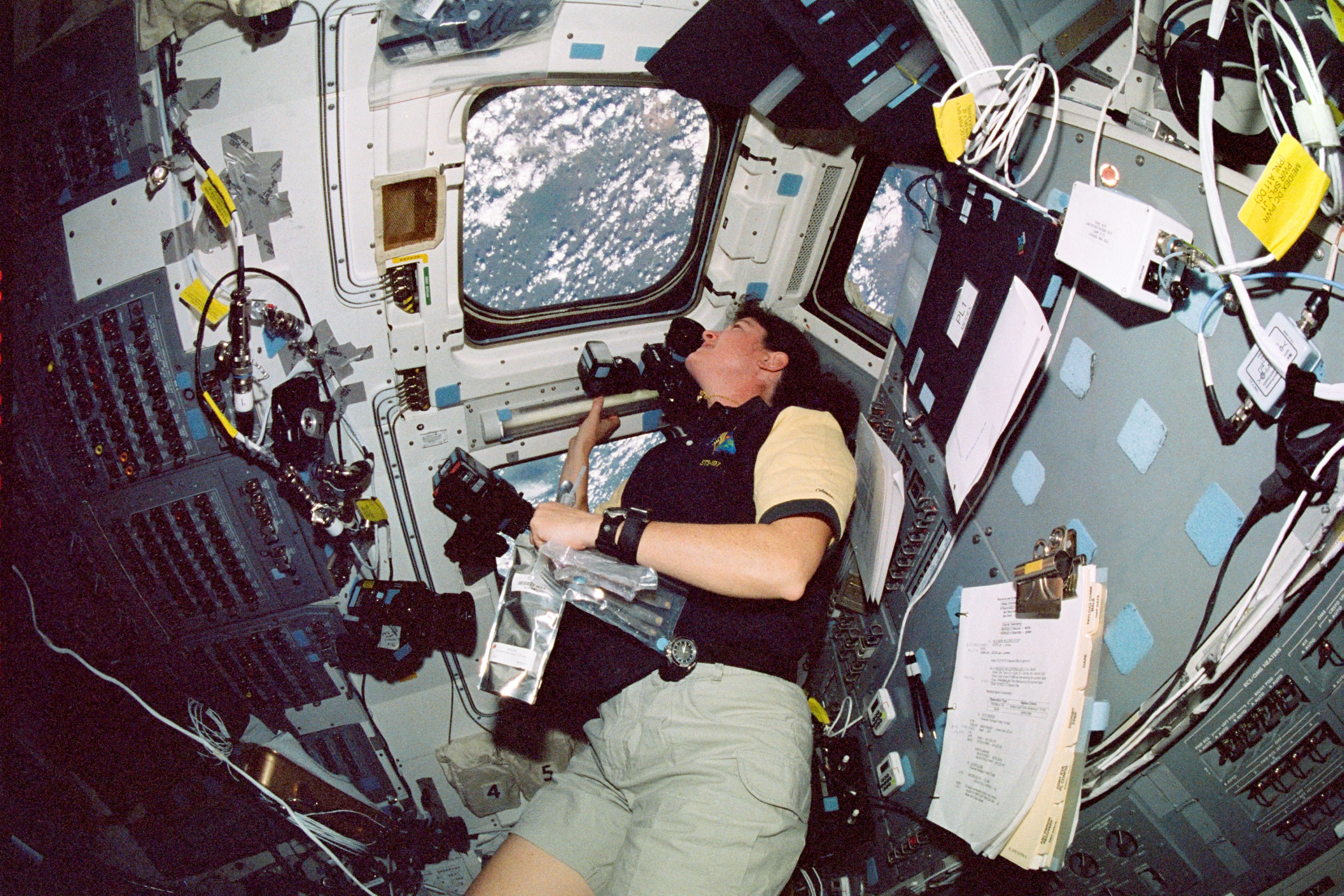
Laurel Clark looks through an overhead window on the aft flight deck of the Shuttle.

STS-107 Columbia – The 16-day flight was a dedicated science and research mission. Working 24 hours a day, in two alternating shifts, the crew successfully conducted approximately 80 experiments. Clark's bioscience experiments included gardening in space, as she discussed only days before her death in an interview with Milwaukee media near her Wisconsin hometown. The STS-107 mission ended abruptly on February 1, 2003, when Columbia disintegrated and her crew perished during re-entry, 16 minutes before scheduled landing.

Clark also recorded inside the cockpit during Columbia's descent into the Earth's atmosphere on a small digital camera.

Clark's final message to her friends and family was through an email sent from Columbia. In the released text of the email, Clark called the planet magnificent, and explained that while she spends much of the time working back in Spacehab and away from the sights of Earth, "whenever I do get to look out, it is glorious." Clark found that taking photos of the Earth was challenging, "Keeping my fingers crossed that they're in sharp focus." Clark also shared some of the intriguing effects of micro gravity on human physiology, such as constant challenge to stay adequately hydrated due to an "almost non-existent" sense of thirst.

== Personal life ==
Clark is survived by her husband, fellow former U.S. Navy captain and NASA flight surgeon Dr. Jonathan Clark (who was part of an official NASA panel that prepared the final 400-page report about the Columbia disaster), and son Iain who was born in 1996. She was also a member of the Olympia Brown Unitarian Universalist Church in Racine, Wisconsin.

== Awards and decorations ==
Clark was awarded numerous insignia and personal decorations including:

=== Qualification insignia ===
- Naval Astronaut/Flight Surgeon
- Naval Flight Surgeon
- Diving Medical Officer
- Submarine Medical Officer

=== Personal decorations ===
- Defense Distinguished Service Medal ^{†}
- Navy and Marine Corps Commendation Medal with 2 gold award stars (3 awards)
- Congressional Space Medal of Honor ^{†}
- NASA Distinguished Service Medal ^{†}
- NASA Space Flight Medal ^{†}
- National Defense Service Medal
- Overseas Service Ribbon

The ^{†} symbol indicates a posthumous award.

== Tributes ==
- Asteroid 51827 Laurelclark was named for Clark.
- Clark Hill in the Columbia Hills on Mars was named for Clark.
- L. Clark, an interior crater of the lunar crater Apollo, was named for Clark.
- Clark Hall, in the Columbia Village Suites at the Florida Institute of Technology, is named after her. The apartments were initially planned to be named the Crane Creek Suites, but were renamed in 2008 to commemorate the Columbia crew.
- The Laurel Salton Clark Memorial Fountain in Racine, Wisconsin is named for her.
- In 2004, the Naval Aerospace Medicine Institute named its Aerospace Medicine Academic Center in Pensacola after Clark and David M. Brown
- Clark Auditorium at Walter Reed National Military Medical Center, Bethesda, Maryland is named for her and displays uniforms, training manuals, and personal items that belonged to her.
- The Scottish band Runrig pays tribute to Clark on the 2016 album The Story. The final track, "Somewhere", ends with a recording of her voice. Clark was a Runrig fan and had a wake up call with Runrig's "Running to the Light". She took their 2001 The Stamping Ground CD into space with her. When the shuttle disintegrated the CD was found among the debris that reached the Earth's surface, and was presented to the band by her family.
- Northrop Grumman named a Cygnus cargo spacecraft S.S. Laurel Clark.
