= 51829 Williemccool =

Asteroid

Discovery
- Discovered by: NEAT
- Discovery site: Palomar Obs.
- Discovery date: 21 July 2001

Designations
- Pronunciation: /ˌwɪliməˈkuːl/
- Named after: William C. McCool (American astronaut)
- Alternative designations: 2001 OD_{41} · 2000 AQ_{162}
- Minor planet category: main-belt · (inner); Vesta

Orbital characteristics
- Epoch 4 September 2017 (JD 2458000.5)
- Uncertainty parameter 0
- Observation arc: 21.28 yr (7,773 days)
- Aphelion: 2.4023 AU
- Perihelion: 2.1540 AU
- Semi-major axis: 2.2782 AU
- Eccentricity: 0.0545
- Orbital period (sidereal): 3.44 yr (1,256 days)
- Mean anomaly: 331.36°
- Mean motion: 0° 17^{m} 11.76^{s} / day
- Inclination: 7.5659°
- Longitude of ascending node: 93.340°
- Argument of perihelion: 119.31°

Physical characteristics
- Dimensions: 1.9 km (est. at 0.40)
- Geometric albedo: 0.40 (assumed)
- Absolute magnitude (H): 15.2

51829 Williemccool (provisional designation 2001 OD_{41}) is a Vestian asteroid from the inner regions of the asteroid belt, approximately 2 kilometers in diameter. It was discovered on 21 July 2001, by astronomers of the Near-Earth Asteroid Tracking program at Palomar Observatory in California, United States. The asteroid was named in memory of American astronaut and pilot William C. McCool, who died in the Space Shuttle Columbia disaster. The designation "Williemccool" reflects his nickname, Willie.

== Orbit and classification ==
Williemccool is a member of the Vesta family (401). Vestian asteroids have a composition akin to cumulate eucrites (HED meteorites) and are thought to have originated deep within 4 Vesta's crust, possibly from the Rheasilvia crater, a large impact crater on its southern hemisphere near the South pole, formed as a result of a subcatastrophic collision. Vesta is the main belt's second-largest and second-most-massive body after Ceres.

It orbits the Sun in the inner main-belt at a distance of 2.2–2.4 AU once every 3 years and 5 months (1,256 days; semi-major axis of 2.28 AU). Its orbit has an eccentricity of 0.05 and an inclination of 8° with respect to the ecliptic.

The body's observation arc begins with a precovery taken by Spacewatch at Kitt Peak Observatory in December 1995, more than 6 years prior to its official discovery observation at Palomar.

== Physical characteristics ==
=== Rotation period ===
As of 2017, no rotational lightcurve of Williemccool has been obtained from photometric observations. The asteroid's rotation period, poles and shape remain unknown.

=== Diameter and albedo ===
Williemccool has not been observed by any of the space-based surveys such as the NEOWISE mission of NASA's Wide-field Infrared Survey Explorer, IRAS or the Akari satellite. A generic magnitude-to-diameter conversion gives a diameter of 1.9 kilometers based on an absolute magnitude of 15.2 and an assumed albedo 0.40, typical for members of the Vesta family.

== Naming ==
This minor planet was named in memory of William Cameron McCool (1961–2003), an American astronaut and pilot of STS-107, who died in the Space Shuttle Columbia disaster on 1 February 2003. The approved naming citation was published by the Minor Planet Center on 6 August 2003 (M.P.C. 49283).

The following asteroids were named in memory of the other six Columbia crew members: 51823 Rickhusband, 51824 Mikeanderson, 51825 Davidbrown, 51826 Kalpanachawla, 51827 Laurelclark and 51828 Ilanramon.
