= 51825 Davidbrown =

Main-belt asteroid

Discovery
- Discovered by: NEAT
- Discovery site: Palomar Obs.
- Discovery date: 19 July 2001

Designations
- Named after: David McDowell Brown (American astronaut)
- Alternative designations: 2001 OQ_{33} · 1994 CZ_{14} 1999 CO_{55}
- Minor planet category: main-belt · (outer); Eos

Orbital characteristics
- Epoch 4 September 2017 (JD 2458000.5)
- Uncertainty parameter 0
- Observation arc: 23.79 yr (8,691 days)
- Aphelion: 3.1755 AU
- Perihelion: 2.7587 AU
- Semi-major axis: 2.9671 AU
- Eccentricity: 0.0702
- Orbital period (sidereal): 5.11 yr (1,867 days)
- Mean anomaly: 316.75°
- Mean motion: 0° 11^{m} 34.08^{s} / day
- Inclination: 9.6190°
- Longitude of ascending node: 23.457°
- Argument of perihelion: 33.210°

Physical characteristics
- Dimensions: 4.913±0.760 km
- Geometric albedo: 0.184±0.032
- Absolute magnitude (H): 14.2

51825 Davidbrown (provisional designation 2001 OQ_{33}) is an Eoan asteroid in the outer region of the asteroid belt, approximately 5 kilometers in diameter. It was discovered on 19 July 2001, by astronomers of the Near-Earth Asteroid Tracking program at Palomar Observatory in California, United States. The asteroid was named for American astronaut David Brown, who died in the Space Shuttle Columbia disaster.

== Orbit and classification ==
Davidbrown is a member the Eos family (606), the largest family in the outer asteroid belt consisting of nearly 10,000 K-type asteroids. It orbits the Sun in the outer main-belt at a distance of 2.8–3.2 AU once every 5 years and 1 month (1,867 days; semi-major axis of 2.97 AU). Its orbit has an eccentricity of 0.07 and an inclination of 10° with respect to the ecliptic.

The body's observation arc begins with its first observation as 1994 CZ_{14} at ESO's La Silla Observatory in February 1994, more than 7 years prior to its official discovery observation at Palomar.

== Physical characteristics ==
=== Diameter and albedo ===
According to the survey carried out by the NEOWISE mission of NASA's Wide-field Infrared Survey Explorer, Davidbrown measures 4.913 kilometers in diameter and its surface has an albedo of 0.184.

=== Rotation period ===
As of 2017, no rotational lightcurve of Davidbrown has been obtained from photometric observations. The asteroid's rotation period, poles and shape remain unknown.

== Naming ==
This minor planet was named after American astronaut and mission specialist David McDowell Brown, who was killed in the Columbia space shuttle reentry disaster on 1 February 2003. The approved naming citation was published by the Minor Planet Center on 6 August 2003 (M.P.C. 49283). The following asteroids were also named in memory of the other six members of STS-107: 51823 Rickhusband, 51824 Mikeanderson, 51826 Kalpanachawla, 51827 Laurelclark, 51828 Ilanramon and 51829 Williemccool.
