= Space Shuttle Columbia disaster =

2003 American crewed spaceflight accident

- Breakup of the Space-Shuttle Columbia, incidentally captured by forward-looking infrared (FLIR) camera aboard an Apache helicopter during training at Fort Hood, Texas
- Date: February 1, 2003; 23 years ago
- Time: 8:59 am EST (UTC-5; 13:59 UTC)
- Location: Over Texas and Louisiana, U.S.
- Cause: Damage to the left wing's leading edge by debris from the external tank during launch
- Outcome: Loss of Columbia and seven astronauts; Space Shuttle fleet grounded for 29 months and subsequently retired after completion of the International Space Station.
- Deaths: Rick Husband, commander; William C. McCool, pilot; Michael P. Anderson, mission specialist; Kalpana Chawla, mission specialist; David M. Brown, mission specialist; Laurel Clark, mission specialist; Ilan Ramon, payload specialist
- Inquiries: Columbia Accident Investigation Board

On February 1, 2003, Space Shuttle Columbia disintegrated as it re-entered the atmosphere over Texas and Louisiana, killing all seven astronauts on board. It was the second of two Space Shuttle missions to end in disaster, after the loss of Challenger and crew in 1986.

The mission, designated STS-107, was the 28th flight for the orbiter and the 113th flight of the Space Shuttle fleet. It was dedicated to research in various fields, mainly on board the SpaceHab module inside the shuttle's payload bay.

During launch, a piece of the insulating foam broke off from the Space Shuttle external tank and struck the thermal protection system tiles on the orbiter's left wing. Similar foam shedding had occurred during previous Space Shuttle launches, causing damage that ranged from minor to near-catastrophic, but some engineers suspected that the damage to Columbia was more serious. When Columbia re-entered the atmosphere of Earth, the damage allowed hot atmospheric gases to penetrate the heat shield and destroy the internal wing structure, which caused the orbiter to become unstable and break apart.

After the disaster, Space Shuttle flight operations were suspended for more than two years, as they had been after the Challenger disaster. Construction of the International Space Station (ISS) was paused until flights resumed in July 2005 with STS-114. NASA made several technical and organizational changes to subsequent missions, including the addition of an on-orbit inspection to determine how well the orbiter's thermal protection system (TPS) had endured the ascent, and continual readiness of designated rescue missions in case irreparable damage was found. Except for one mission to repair the Hubble Space Telescope, subsequent Space Shuttle missions were flown only to the ISS to allow the crew to use it as a haven if damage to the orbiter prevented safe re-entry. The remaining three orbiters were retired after the building of the ISS was completed.

== Background ==
=== Space Shuttle ===
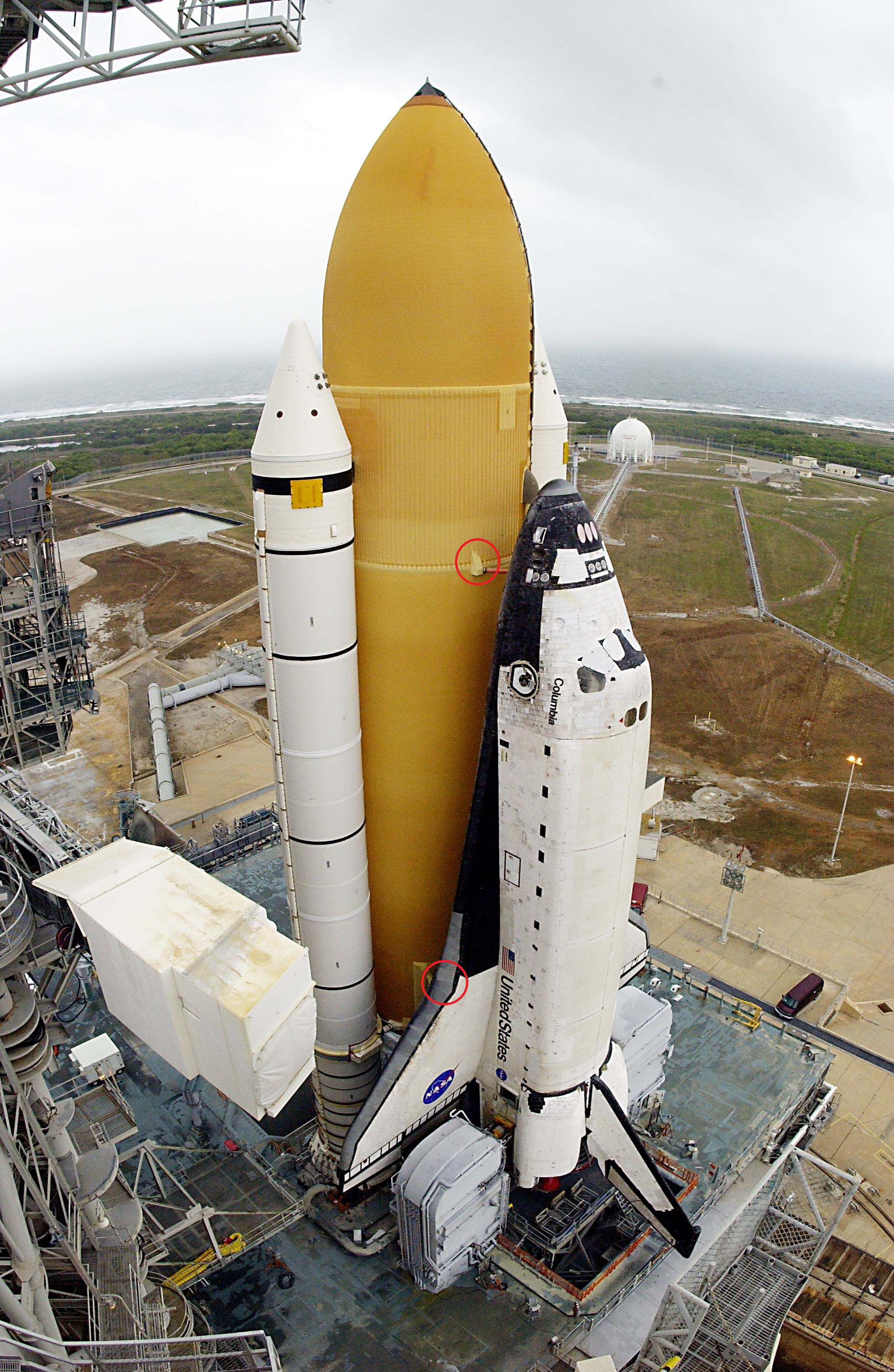
Columbia prior to launch. The circled area on the external tank (ET) is the left bipod foam ramp, and the circled area on the orbiter is the location that was damaged.

The Space Shuttle was a partially reusable spacecraft operated by the US National Aeronautics and Space Administration (NASA). It flew in space for the first time in April 1981, and was used to conduct in-orbit research, and deploy commercial, military, and scientific payloads. At launch, it consisted of the orbiter, which contained the crew and payload, the external tank (ET), and the two solid rocket boosters (SRBs). The orbiter was a reusable, winged vehicle that launched vertically and landed as a glider. Five operational orbiters were built during the Space Shuttle program. Columbia was the first space-rated orbiter constructed, following the atmospheric test vehicle Enterprise. The orbiter contained the crew compartment, where the crew predominantly lived and worked throughout a mission. Three Space Shuttle main engines (SSMEs) were mounted at the aft end of the orbiter and provided thrust during launch. Once in space, the crew maneuvered using the two smaller, aft-mounted Orbital Maneuvering System (OMS) engines.

The orbiter was protected from heat during re-entry by the thermal protection system (TPS), a thermal soaking protective layer around the orbiter. In contrast with previous US spacecraft, which had used ablative heat shields, the reusability of the orbiter required a multi-use heat shield. During re-entry, the TPS experienced temperatures up to 3,000 °F (1,600 °C), but had to keep the orbiter vehicle's aluminum skin temperature below 350 °F (180 °C). The TPS primarily consisted of four sub-systems. The nose cone and leading edges of the wings experienced temperatures above 2,300 °F (1,300 °C), and were protected by the composite material reinforced carbon–carbon (RCC). Thicker RCC was developed and installed in 1998 to prevent damage from micrometeoroid and orbital debris. The entire underside of the orbiter vehicle, as well as the other hottest surfaces, were protected with black high-temperature reusable surface insulation. Areas on the upper parts of the orbiter vehicle were covered with white low-temperature reusable surface insulation, which provided protection at temperatures below 1,200 °F (650 °C). The payload bay doors and parts of the upper wing surfaces were covered with reusable felt surface insulation, as the temperature there remained below 700 °F (370 °C).

Two solid rocket boosters (SRBs) were connected to the ET, and burned for the first two minutes of flight. The SRBs separated from the ET once they had expended their fuel and fell into the Atlantic Ocean under a parachute. NASA retrieval teams recovered the SRBs and returned them to the Kennedy Space Center (KSC), where they were disassembled and their components were reused on future flights.

When the Space Shuttle launched, the orbiter and SRBs were connected to the ET, which held the fuel for the SSMEs. The ET consisted of a tank for liquid hydrogen (LH2), stored at −423 °F (−253 °C) and a smaller tank for liquid oxygen (LOX), stored at −297 °F (−183 °C). It was covered in insulating foam to keep the liquids cold and prevent ice forming on the tank's exterior. The orbiter connected to the ET via two umbilicals near its bottom and a bipod near its top section. After its fuel had been expended, the ET separated from the orbiter and reentered the atmosphere, where it would break apart during re-entry and its pieces would land in the Indian or Pacific Ocean.

=== Debris strike concerns ===
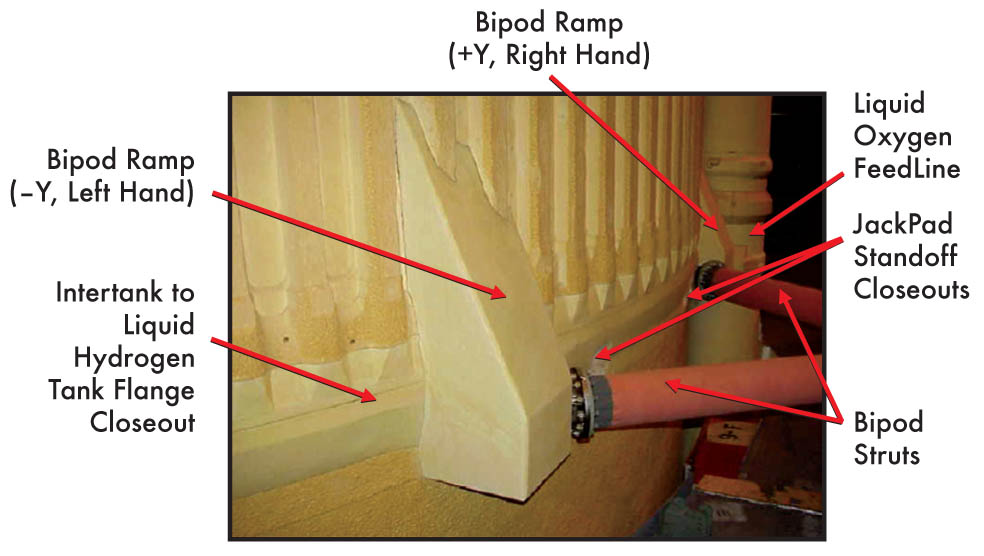
Close-up of the left bipod foam ramp that broke off and damaged the orbiter wing

During the design process of the Space Shuttle, a requirement of the ET was that it would not release any debris that could potentially damage the orbiter and its TPS. The integrity of the TPS components was necessary for the survival of the crew during re-entry, and the tiles and panels were only built to withstand relatively minor impacts. On STS-1, the first flight of the Space Shuttle, the orbiter Columbia was damaged during its launch from a foam strike. Foam strikes occurred regularly during Space Shuttle launches; of the 79 missions with available imagery during launch, foam strikes occurred on 65.

The bipod connected the ET near the top to the front underside of the orbiter via two struts with a ramp at the tank end of each strut; the ramps were covered in foam to prevent ice from forming that could damage the orbiter. The foam on each bipod ramp was approximately 30 by 14 by 12 inches (76 by 36 by 30 cm), and was carved by hand from the original foam application. Bipod ramp foam from the left strut had been observed falling off the ET on six flights prior to STS-107, and had created some of the largest foam strikes that the orbiter experienced. (Note: No foam shedding was ever observed from the right bipod ramp. In its report, the CAIB hypothesized that this is because of the ET's liquid oxygen line, which partially shielded the right strut from aerodynamic forces.) The first bipod ramp foam strike occurred during STS-7; the orbiter's TPS was repaired after the mission but no changes were made to address the cause of the bipod foam loss. After bipod foam loss on STS-32, NASA engineers, under the assumption that the foam loss was due to pressure buildup within the insulation, added vent holes to the foam to allow gas to escape. After a bipod foam strike damaged the TPS on STS-50, internal NASA investigations concluded it was an "accepted flight risk" and that it should not be treated as a flight safety issue. Bipod foam loss occurred on STS-52 and STS-62, but neither event was noticed until the investigation following Columbia's destruction.

During STS-112, which flew in October 2002, a 4-by-5-by-12-inch (10 by 13 by 30 cm) chunk of bipod ramp foam broke away from the ET bipod ramp and hit the SRB-ET attachment ring near the bottom of the left SRB, creating a dent 4 inches (10 cm) wide and 3 inches (8 cm) deep. Following the mission, the Program Requirements Control Board declined to categorize the bipod ramp foam loss as an in-flight anomaly. The foam loss was briefed at the STS-113 Flight Readiness Brief, but the Program Requirements Control Board decided that the ET was safe to fly.

A debris strike from the ablative material on the right SRB caused significant damage to Atlantis during the STS-27 launch on December 2, 1988. On the second day of the flight the crew inspected the damage using a camera on the remote manipulator system. The debris strike had removed a tile; the exposed orbiter skin was a reinforced section, and a burn-through might have occurred had the damage been in a different location. After that mission, the NASA Program Requirements Control Board designated the issue as an in-flight anomaly, which was later corrected with the planned improvement for the SRB ablator. The Columbia Investigative Review Board noted the difference in how the STS-27 and STS-107 debris strike events were treated. Upon the debris strike discovery on STS-27, the crew was immediately directed to inspect the vehicle. Fourteen years later, when the debris strike on STS-107 was discovered, Shuttle Program management declined to have the crew inspect the orbiter for damage or to request on-orbit imaging, ultimately discounting the possibility of a burn-through. The Board viewed the failure of Shuttle management to consider the threat to STS-107 posed by a strike similar to STS-27 as a sign that NASA was not functioning as a learning organization.

== Flight ==
=== Space Shuttle mission ===
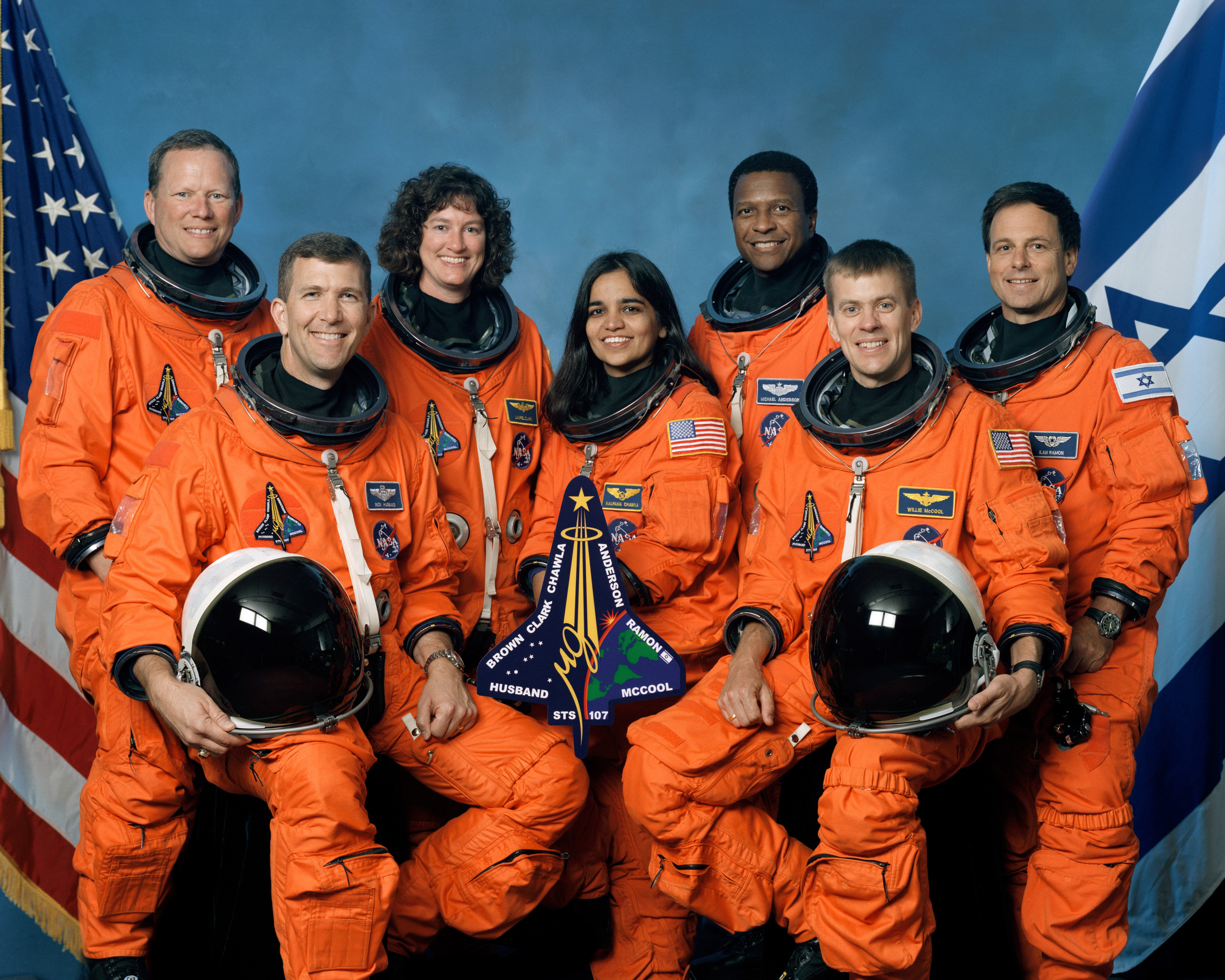
The crew of STS-107. From left to right: Brown, Husband, Clark, Chawla, Anderson, McCool, Ramon.

For STS-107, Columbia carried the SpaceHab Research Double Module, the Orbital Acceleration Research Experiment, and an Extended Duration Orbiter pallet. The mission passed its pre-launch certifications and reviews, and began with the launch. The mission was originally scheduled to launch on January 11, 2001, but it was delayed thirteen times, until its launch on January 16, 2003.

The seven-member crew of STS-107 were selected in July 2000. The mission was commanded by Rick Husband, who was a colonel in the US Air Force and a test pilot. He had previously flown on STS-96. The mission's pilot was William McCool, a US Navy commander who was on his first spaceflight. The payload commander was Michael Anderson, a US Air Force lieutenant colonel who had previously flown on STS-89. Kalpana Chawla served as the flight engineer; she had previously flown on STS-87. David Brown and Laurel Clark, both Navy captains, flew as the mission specialists on their first spaceflights. Ilan Ramon, a colonel in the Israeli Air Force and the first Israeli astronaut, flew as a payload specialist on his first spaceflight.

=== Launch and debris strike ===
STS-107 ignition, launch and lift-off of Columbia

Columbia was launched from the Kennedy Space Center Launch Complex 39A (LC-39A) on January 16, 2003 at 10:39:00 am. At T+81.7 seconds, a piece of foam approximately 21 to 27 inches (53 to 69 cm) long and 12 to 18 inches (30 to 46 cm) wide broke off from the left bipod on the ET. At T+81.9 seconds, the foam struck the reinforced carbon–carbon (RCC) panels on Columbia's left wing at relative velocity of 625 to 840 feet per second (426 to 573 mph; 686 to 922 km/h). The foam's low ballistic coefficient caused it to lose speed immediately after separating from the ET, and the orbiter ran into the slower foam. Neither the mission nor ground crew noticed the debris strike at the time. The SRBs separated from the ET at T+2 minutes and 7 seconds, followed by the ET's separation from the orbiter at T+8 minutes 30 seconds. The ET separation was photographed by Anderson and recorded by Brown, but they did not record the bipod with missing foam. At T+43 minutes, Columbia completed its orbital insertion as planned.

=== Flight risk management ===
Footage of the debris strike at T+81.9 seconds

After Columbia entered orbit, the NASA Intercenter Photo Working Group conducted a routine review of videos of the launch. The group's analysts did not notice the debris strike until the second day of the mission. None of the cameras that recorded the launch had a clear view of the debris striking the wing, leaving the group unable to determine the level of damage sustained by the orbiter. The group's chair contacted Wayne Hale, the Shuttle Program Manager for Launch Integration, to request on-orbit pictures of Columbia's wing to assess its damage. After receiving notification of the debris strike, engineers at NASA, United Space Alliance, and Boeing created the Debris Assessment Team and began working to determine the damage to the orbiter. Intercenter Photo Working Group believed that the orbiter's RCC tiles were possibly damaged; NASA program managers were less concerned over the danger caused by the debris strike.

Boeing analysts attempted to model the damage caused to the orbiter's TPS from the foam strike. The software models predicted damage that was deeper than the thickness of the TPS tiles, indicating that the orbiter's aluminum skin would be unprotected in that area. The Debris Assessment Team dismissed this conclusion as inaccurate, because several previous predictions under similar conditions had forecast greater problems than actually occurred. Further modeling specific to the RCC panels used software calibrated to predict damage caused by falling ice. The software predicted only one of 15 scenarios that ice would cause damage, leading the Debris Assessment Team to conclude there was minimal damage due to the lower density of foam to ice.

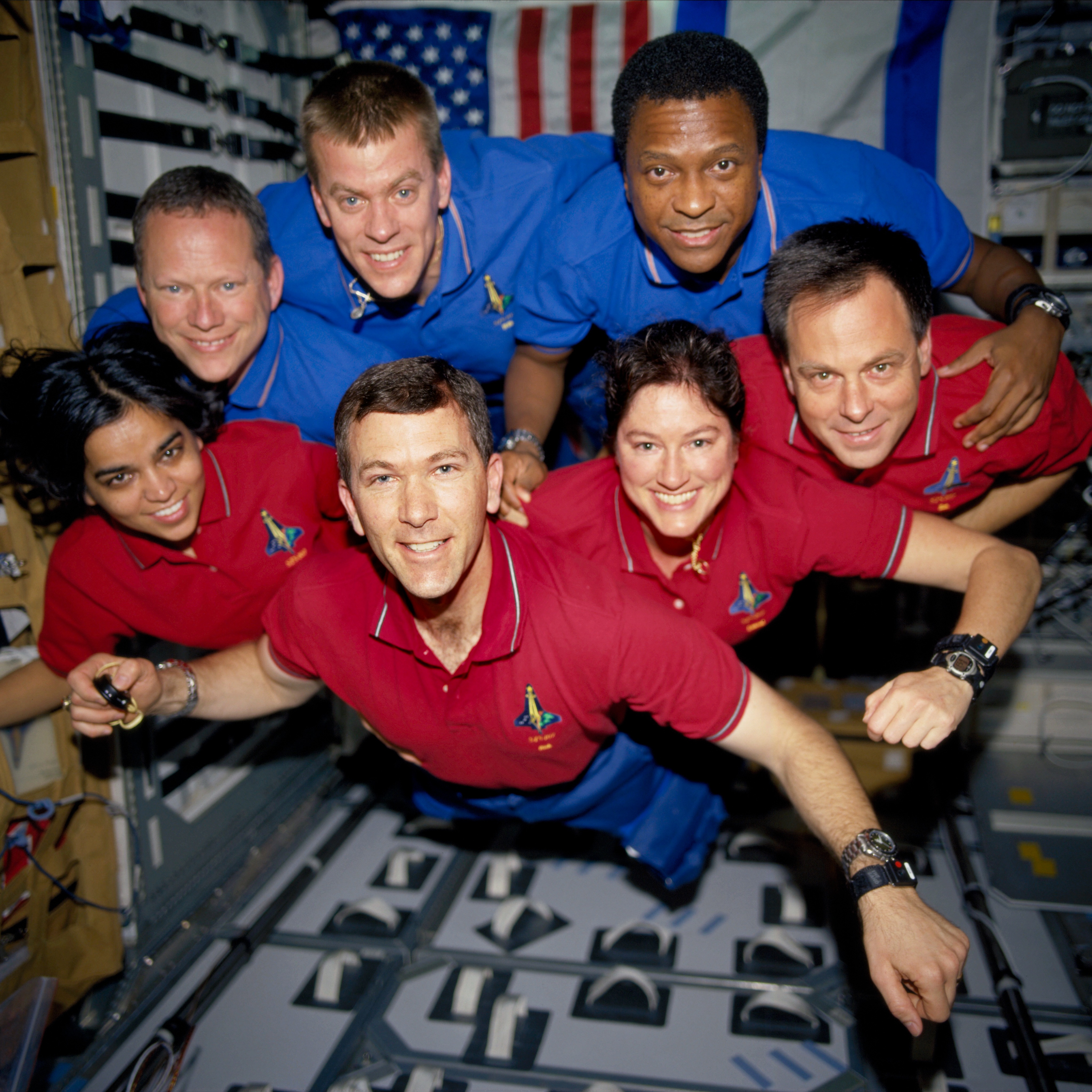
STS-107 crew posing for a group photo in space

To assess the possible damage to Columbia's wing, members of the Debris Assessment Team made multiple requests to get imagery of the orbiter from the Department of Defense (DoD). Imagery requests were channeled through both the DoD Manned Space Flight Support Office and the Johnson Space Center Engineering Directorate. Hale coordinated the request through a DoD representative at KSC. The request was relayed to the US Strategic Command (USSTRATCOM), which began identifying imaging assets that could observe the orbiter. The imagery request was soon rescinded by NASA Mission Management Team Chair Linda Ham after she investigated the origin of it. She had consulted with Flight Director Phil Engelauf and members of the Mission Management Team, who stated that they did not have a requirement for imagery of Columbia. Ham did not consult with the Debris Assessment Team, and cancelled the imagery request on the basis that it had not been made through official channels. Maneuvering the orbiter to allow its left wing to be imaged would have interrupted ongoing science operations, and Ham dismissed the DoD imaging capabilities as insufficient to assess damage to the orbiter. Following the rejection of their imagery request, the Debris Assessment Team did not make further requests for the orbiter to be imaged.

January 31, 2003 NASA Entry Status Briefing Flight Day 16 of the STS-107 with Flight Director LeRoy E. Cain. Reporter question concerning acknowledged TPS tile damage at 6:13

Throughout the flight, members of the Mission Management Team were less concerned than the Debris Assessment Team about the potential risk of a debris strike. The loss of bipod foam on STS-107 was compared to previous foam strike events, none of which caused the loss of an orbiter or crew. Ham, scheduled to work as an integration manager for STS-114, was concerned with the potential delays from a foam loss event. Mission management also downplayed the risk of the debris strike in communications with the crew. On January 23, flight director Steve Stich sent an e-mail to Husband and McCool to tell them about the foam strike and inform them there was no cause for concern about damage to the TPS, as foam strikes had occurred on previous flights.

During ascent at approximately 80 seconds, photo analysis shows that some debris from the area of the -Y ET Bipod Attach Point came loose and subsequently impacted the orbiter left wing, in the area of transition from Chine to Main Wing, creating a shower of smaller particles. The impact appears to be totally on the lower surface and no particles are seen to traverse over the upper surface of the wing. Experts have reviewed the high speed photography and there is no concern for RCC or tile damage. We have seen this same phenomenon on several other flights and there is absolutely no concern for entry.

The crew were also sent a fifteen-second video of the debris strike in preparation for a press conference, but were reassured that there were no safety concerns.

Detail of Columbia in orbit, taken with a visible camera by the U.S. Air Force Maui Optical and Supercomputing Site (AMOS) 28 January 2003.

On January 26, the Debris Assessment Team concluded that there were no safety concerns from the debris strike. The team's report was critical of the Mission Management Team for asserting that there were no safety concerns before the Debris Assessment Team's investigation had been completed. On January 29, William Readdy, the associate administrator for space flight, agreed to DoD imaging of the orbiter, but on the condition that it would not interfere with flight operations; ultimately, the orbiter was not imaged by the DoD during the flight. At a Mission Management Team meeting on January 31, the day before Columbia reentered the atmosphere, the Launch Integration Office voiced Ham's intention to review on-board footage to view the missing foam, but concerns of crew safety were not discussed.

=== Reentry ===
Video taken by the crew ends four minutes before the disaster.

Columbia was scheduled to reenter the atmosphere and land on February 1, 2003. At 3:30 am EST the Entry Flight Control Team started its shift at the Mission Control Center. On board the orbiter, the crew stowed loose items and prepared their equipment for reentry.

At 45 minutes before the deorbit burn, (Note: The deorbit burn involves firing the shuttle's engines to reduce its velocity; this causes the shuttle's orbit to decay, thus allowing it to begin re-entering the Earth's atmosphere in preparation for landing.) Husband and McCool began working through the entry checklist. At 8:10 am the Capsule Communicator (CAPCOM), Charlie Hobaugh, informed the crew that they were approved to conduct the deorbit burn. At 8:15:30 the crew successfully executed the deorbit burn, which lasted 2 minutes and 38 seconds. At 8:44:09 Columbia reentered the atmosphere at an altitude of 400,000 feet (120 km), a point named entry interface. The damage to the TPS on the orbiter's left wing allowed hot air to enter and begin melting the aluminum structure. Four and a half minutes after entry interface, a sensor began recording greater-than-normal amounts of strain on the left wing; the sensor's data was recorded to internal storage and not transmitted to the crew or ground controllers. The orbiter began to turn (yaw) to the left as a result of the increased drag on the left wing, but this was not noticed by the crew or mission control because of corrections from the orbiter's flight control system. This was followed by sensors in the left wheel well reporting a rise in temperature.

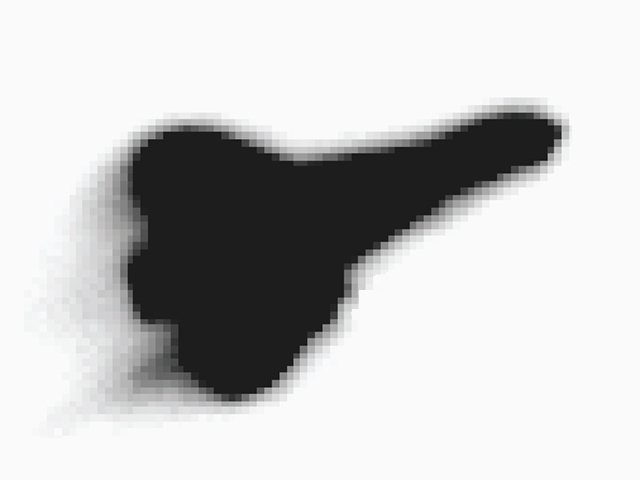
Columbia at about 08:57. Debris is visible coming from the left wing (bottom). The image was taken at Starfire Optical Range at Kirtland Air Force Base.

At 8:53:46 am, Columbia crossed over the California coast; it was traveling at Mach 23 at an altitude of 231,600 feet (70.6 km), and the temperature of its wings' leading edges was estimated to be 2,800 °F (1,540 °C). Soon after it entered California airspace, the orbiter shed several pieces of debris, events observed on the ground as sudden increases in brightness of the air around the orbiter. The MMACS officer reported that the hydraulic sensors in the left wing had readings below the sensors' minimum detection thresholds at 8:54:24 am. Columbia continued its reentry and traveled over Utah, Arizona, New Mexico, and Texas, where observers would report seeing signs of debris being shed.

At 8:58:03, the orbiter's aileron trim changed from the predicted values because of the increasing drag caused by the damage to the left wing. At 8:58:21, the orbiter shed a TPS tile that would later land in Littlefield, Texas; it would become the westernmost piece of recovered debris. The crew first received an indication of a problem at 8:58:39, when the Backup Flight Software monitor began displaying fault messages for a loss of pressure in the tires of the left landing gear. The pilot and commander then received indications that the status of the left landing gear was unknown, as different sensors reported the gear was down and locked or in the stowed position. The drag of the left wing continued to yaw the orbiter to the left until it could no longer be corrected using aileron trim. The orbiter's Reaction Control System (RCS) thrusters began firing continuously to correct its orientation.

NASA in-house coincidental videography capture of mission control during the final moments of descent. LOS between craft and mission control is lost at approximately 5:15. Official staff acknowledgement of incident at 11:50.

The loss of signal (LOS) from Columbia occurred at 8:59:32. Mission control stopped receiving information from the orbiter at this time, and Husband's last radio call of "Roger, uh ..." was cut off mid-transmission. One of the channels in the flight control system was bypassed as the result of a failed wire, and a Master Alarm began sounding on the flight deck. Loss of control of the orbiter is estimated to have begun several seconds later with a loss of hydraulic pressure and an uncontrolled pitch-up maneuver. The orbiter began flying along a ballistic trajectory, which was significantly steeper and had more drag than the previous gliding trajectory. The orbiter, while still traveling faster than Mach 15, entered into a flat spin of 30° to 40° per second. The acceleration that the crew was experiencing increased from approximately 0.8 g to 3 g, which would have likely caused dizziness and disorientation, but not incapacitation. The autopilot was switched to manual control and reset to automatic mode at 9:00:03; this would have required the input of either Husband or McCool, indicating that they were still conscious and able to perform functions at the time. All hydraulic pressure was lost, and McCool's final switch configurations indicate that he had tried to restore the hydraulic systems at some time after 9:00:05.

At 9:00:18, the orbiter began a catastrophic breakup, and all on-board data recording soon ceased. Ground observers noted a sudden increase in debris being shed, and all on-board systems lost power. By 9:00:25, the orbiter's fore and aft sections had separated from one another. The sudden jerk caused the crew compartment to collide with the interior wall of the fuselage, resulting in the start of depressurization of the crew compartment by 9:00:35. The pieces of the orbiter continued to break apart into smaller pieces, and within a minute after breakup were too small to be detected by ground-based videos. A NASA report estimates that by 9:35, all crew remains and a majority of debris had hit the ground.

The loss of signal occurred at a time when the Flight Control Team expected brief communication outages as the orbiter stopped communication via the west tracking and data relay satellite (TDRS). Personnel in Mission Control were unaware of the in-flight break-up, and continued to try to reestablish contact with the orbiter. At around 9:12:39, when Columbia would have been conducting its final maneuvers to land, a Mission Control member received a phone call concerning news coverage of the orbiter breaking up. This information was immediately passed on to the Entry Flight Director, LeRoy Cain, who initiated contingency procedures. At KSC, where Columbia had been expected to land at 9:16, NASA Associate Administrator and former astronaut William Readdy also began contingency procedures after the orbiter did not land as scheduled.

=== Crew survivability ===
Side-by-Side edit of post-CAIB telemetry data examination and mission control interior, in approximate real-time.

During reentry, all seven of the STS-107 crew members were killed, but the exact time of their deaths could not be determined. The level of acceleration that they experienced during crew module breakup was not lethal. The first lethal event the crew experienced was the depressurization of the crew module. The rate and exact time of complete depressurization could not be determined, but it occurred no later than 9:00:59 and was likely much earlier. The remains of the crew members indicated they all experienced depressurization. The astronauts' helmets have a visor that, when closed, can temporarily protect the crew member from depressurization. None of the crew members had closed their visors, one was not wearing a helmet, and three were not wearing their pressure suit gloves; this would indicate that depressurization occurred quickly before they could take protective measures. They were rendered unconscious or deceased within seconds and tissue damage was extensive enough that they could not have regained consciousness even if the cabin had regained pressurization.

During and after the breakup of the crew module, the crew, either unconscious or dead, experienced rotation on all three axes. The astronauts' shoulder harnesses were unable to prevent trauma to their upper bodies, as the inertia reel system failed to retract sufficiently to secure them, leaving them only restrained by their lap belts. The helmets were not conformal to the crew members' heads, allowing head injuries to occur inside the helmet. The neck ring of the helmet may have also acted as a fulcrum that caused spine and neck injuries. The physical trauma to the astronauts, who could not brace to prevent such injuries, also could have resulted in their deaths.

The astronauts also likely suffered from significant thermal trauma. Hot gas entered the disintegrating crew module, burning the crew members, whose bodies were still somewhat protected by their ACES suits. Once the crew module fell apart, the astronauts were violently exposed to windblast and a possible shock wave, which stripped their suits from their bodies. The crews' remains were exposed to hot gas and molten metal as they fell away from the orbiter.

After separation from the crew module, the bodies of the crew members entered an environment with almost no oxygen, very low atmospheric pressure, and both high temperatures caused by deceleration, and extremely low ambient temperatures. Their bodies hit the ground with lethal force.

== Presidential response ==
President George W. Bush's address on the Columbia disaster, February 1, 2003

At 14:04 EST (19:04 UTC), President George W. Bush said in a televised address to the nation, "My fellow Americans, this day has brought terrible news, and great sadness to our country. At 9:00 o'clock this morning, Mission Control in Houston lost contact with our Space Shuttle Columbia. A short time later, debris was seen falling from the skies above Texas. The Columbia is lost; there are no survivors."

== Recovery of debris ==
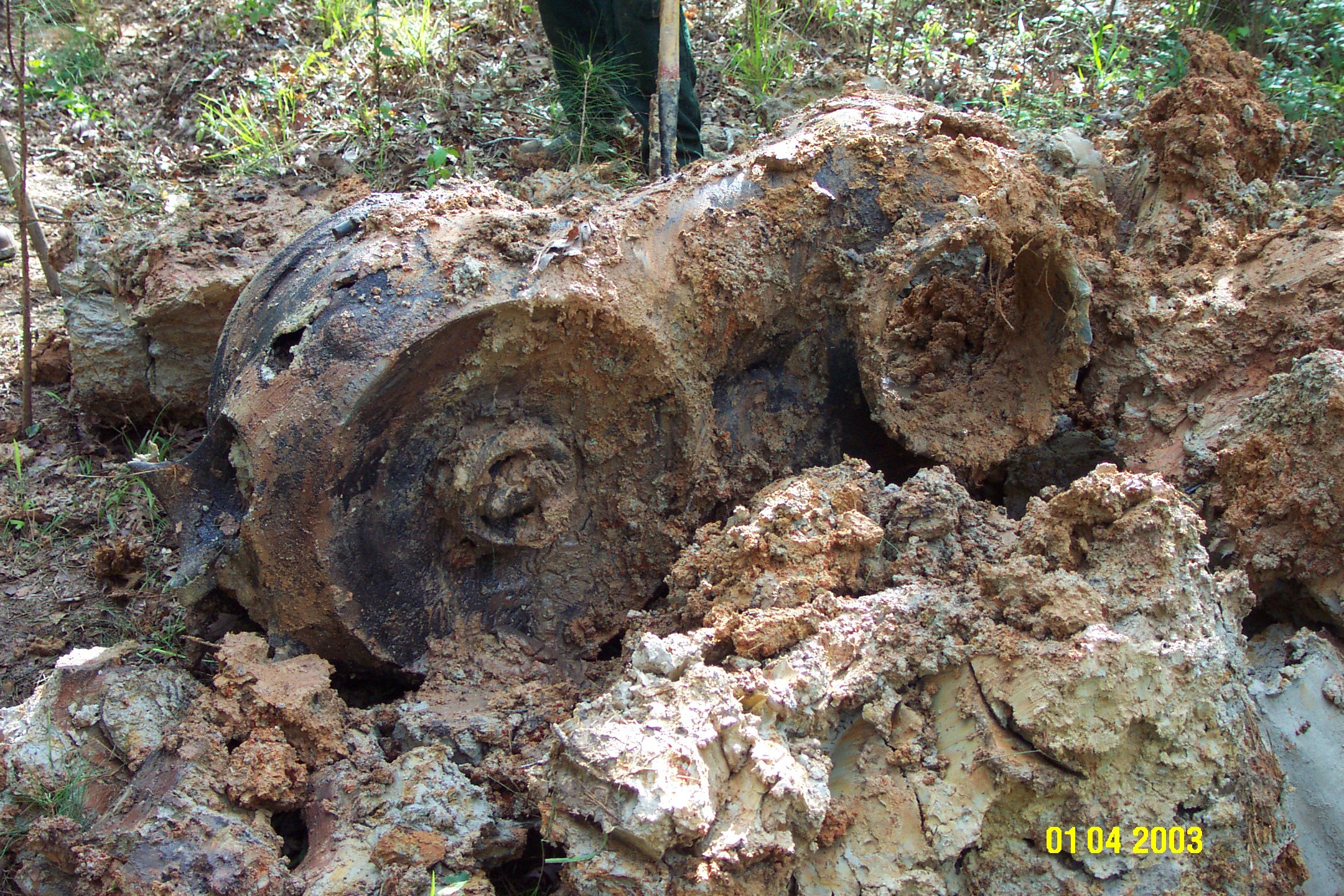
Recovered power-head of one of Columbia's main engines

After the orbiter broke up, reports came in to eastern Texas law enforcement agencies of an explosion and falling debris. Astronauts Mark Kelly and Gregory Johnson traveled on a US Coast Guard helicopter from Houston to Nacogdoches, and Jim Wetherbee drove a team of astronauts to Lufkin to assist with recovery efforts. Debris was reported from east Texas through southern Louisiana. Recovery crews and local volunteers worked to locate and identify debris.

On the first day of the disaster, searchers began finding remains of the astronauts. Within three days of the crash, some remains from every crew member had been recovered. These recoveries occurred along a line south of Hemphill, Texas, and west of the Toledo Bend Reservoir. The final body of a crew member was recovered on February 11. The crew remains were transported to the Armed Forces Institute of Pathology at Walter Reed Army Medical Center in Washington DC.

Immediately after the disaster, the Texas Army National Guard deployed 300 members to assist with security and recovery, and the Coast Guard Gulf Strike Team was assigned to help recover hazardous debris. Over the following days, the search grew to include hundreds of individuals from the Environmental Protection Agency, US Forest Service, Civil Air Patrol, and Texas and Louisiana public safety organizations, as well as local volunteers. In the months after the disaster, the largest-ever organized ground search took place. NASA officials warned of the dangers of handling debris, as it could have been contaminated by propellants.

Soon after the accident, some individuals attempted to sell Columbia debris on the internet, including on the online auction website eBay. Officials at NASA were critical of these efforts, as the debris was NASA property and was needed for the investigation. A three-day amnesty period was offered for recovered orbiter debris. During this time, about 20 individuals contacted NASA to return debris, which included debris from the Challenger disaster. After the end of the amnesty period, several individuals were arrested for illegal looting and possession of debris.

Columbia's flight data recorder was found near Hemphill, Texas, 75 miles (121 km) southeast of Nacogdoches, on March 19, 2003. Columbia was the first orbiter, and it had a unique flight data OEX (orbiter experiments) recorder to record vehicle performance data during the test flights. The recorder was left in Columbia after the initial Shuttle test-flights were completed, and began recording information 15 minutes prior to reentry. The tape it recorded to was broken at the time of the crash, but information from the orbiter's sensors could have been recorded beforehand. Several days later, the tape was sent to the Imation Corporation for it to be inspected and cleaned. On March 25, the OEX's tape was sent to KSC, where it was copied and analyzed.

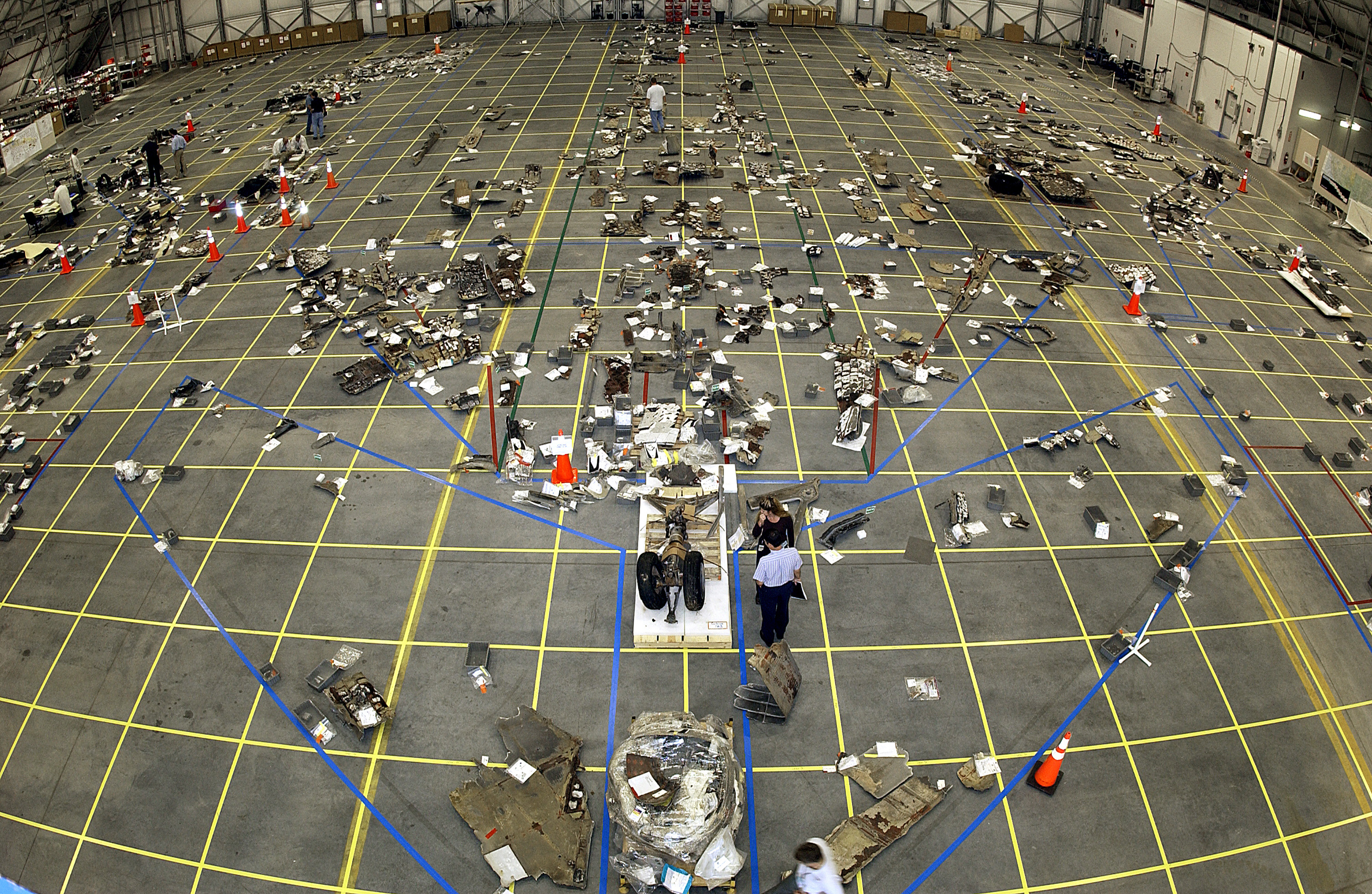
A grid on the floor is used to organize recovered debris.

On March 27, a Bell 407 helicopter that was being used in the debris search crashed due to mechanical failure in the Angelina National Forest. The crash killed the pilot, Jules F. Mier Jr., and a Texas Forest Service aviation specialist, Charles Krenek, and injured three other crew members.

A group of Caenorhabditis elegans worms, enclosed in aluminum canisters, survived reentry and impact with the ground and were recovered weeks after the disaster. The culture, which was part of an experiment to research their growth while consuming synthetic nutrients, was found to be alive on April 28, 2003.

NASA management selected the Reusable Launch Vehicle hangar at KSC to reconstruct recovered Columbia debris. NASA Launch Director Michael Leinbach led the reconstruction team, which was staffed by Columbia engineers and technicians. Debris was laid out on the floor of the hangar in the shape of the orbiter to allow investigators to look for patterns in the damage that indicated the cause of the disaster. Astronaut Pamela Melroy was assigned to oversee the six-person team reconstructing the crew compartment, which included fellow astronaut Marsha Ivins.

Recovered debris was shipped from the field to KSC, where it was unloaded and checked to see if it was contaminated by toxic hypergolic propellants. Each piece of debris had an identifying number and a tag indicating the coordinates where it was found. Staff attached photographs and catalogued each piece of debris. Recovered debris from inside the orbiter was placed in a separate area, as it was not considered to be a contributor to the accident. NASA conducted a fault tree analysis to determine the probable causes of the accident, and focused its investigations on the parts of the orbiter most likely to have been responsible for the in-flight breakup. Engineers in the hangar analyzed the debris to determine how the orbiter came apart. Even though the crew compartment was not considered as a likely cause of the accident, Melroy successfully argued for its analysis to learn more about how its safety systems helped, or failed to help, the crew survive. The tiles on the left wing were studied to determine the nature of the burning and melting that occurred. The damage to the debris indicated that the breach began at the wing's leading edge, allowing hot gas to get past the orbiter's thermal protection system.

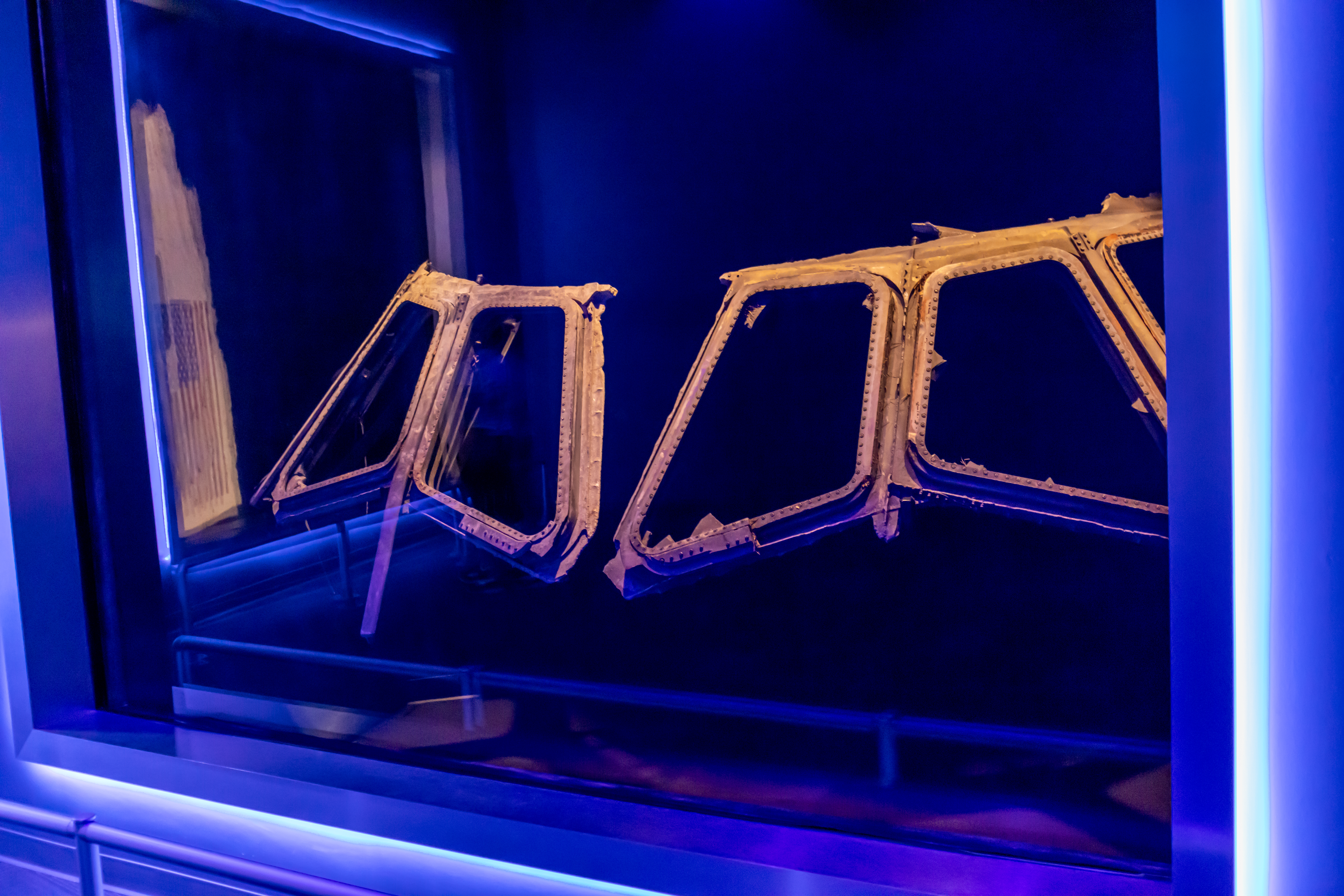
Columbia's recovered window frames at the "Forever Remembered" exhibit at KSC Visitor Complex

The search for Columbia debris ended in May. Approximately 83,900 pieces of debris were recovered, weighing 84,900 pounds (38,500 kg), which was about 38 percent of the orbiter's overall weight. When the CAIB report was released, about 40,000 recovered pieces of debris had not been identified. All recovered non-human Columbia debris was stored in unused office space at the Vehicle Assembly Building, except for parts of the crew compartment, which were kept separate. By the end of reconstruction efforts only 720 items remained classified as unknown.

In July 2011, lower water levels caused by a drought revealed a four-foot-diameter (1.2 m) piece of debris in Lake Nacogdoches. NASA identified the piece as a power reactant storage and distribution tank.

== Columbia Accident Investigation Board ==
Mock-up of an orbiter's wing's leading edge made with an RCC-panel taken from Atlantis. Simulation of known and possible conditions of the foam impact on Columbia's final launch showed brittle fracture of RCC.

About ninety minutes after the disaster, NASA Administrator Sean O'Keefe called to convene the Columbia Accident Investigation Board (CAIB) to determine the cause. It was chaired by retired US Navy Admiral Harold W. Gehman, Jr. and included military and civilian analysts. It initially consisted of 8 members, including Gehman, but expanded to 13 members by March. The CAIB members were notified by noon on the day of the accident, and participated in a teleconference that evening. The following day, they traveled to Barksdale AFB to begin the investigation. The CAIB members first toured the debris fields, and then established their operations at JSC. The CAIB established four teams to investigate NASA management and program safety, NASA training and crew operations, the technical aspects of the disaster, and how NASA culture affected the Space Shuttle program. These groups collaborated, and hired other support staff to investigate. The CAIB worked alongside the reconstruction efforts to determine the cause of the accident, and interviewed members of the Space Shuttle program, including those who had been involved with STS-107. The CAIB conducted public hearings from March until June, and released its final report in August 2003.

=== Cause of the accident ===
February 14, 2003 NASA post-accident Entry Flight Director Briefing, at Johnson SFC.

After looking at sensor data, the CAIB considered damage to the left wing as a likely culprit for Columbia's destruction. An investigation studied recovered debris and noted the difference in heat damage between the two wings. RCC panels from the left wing were found in the western portion of the debris field, indicating that it was shed first before the rest of the orbiter disintegrated. X-ray and chemical analysis was conducted on the RCC panels, revealing the highest levels of slag deposits to be in the left wing tiles. Impact testing was conducted at the Southwest Research Institute, using a nitrogen-powered gun to fire a projectile made of the same material as the ET bipod foam. Panels taken from Enterprise, Discovery, and Atlantis were used to determine the projectiles' effect on RCC panels. A test on RCC panel 8, taken from Atlantis, was the most consistent with the damage observed on Columbia, indicating it was the damaged panel that led to the in-flight breakup.

=== Organizational culture ===
The CAIB was critical of NASA organizational culture, and compared its current state to that of NASA leading up to the Challenger disaster. It concluded that NASA was experiencing budget constraints while still expecting to keep a high level of launches and operations. Program operating costs were lowered by 21% from 1991 to 1994, despite a planned increase in the yearly flight rate for assembly of the International Space Station. Despite a history of foam strike events, NASA management did not consider the potential risk to the astronauts as a safety-of-flight issue. The CAIB found that a lack of a safety program led to the lack of concern over foam strikes. The board determined that NASA lacked the appropriate communication and integration channels to allow problems to be discussed and effectively routed and addressed. This risk was further compounded by pressure to adhere to a launch schedule for construction of the ISS.

=== Possible emergency procedures ===
In its report, the CAIB discussed potential options that could have saved Columbia's crew. They determined that the mission could have been extended to at most 30 days (February 15), after which the lithium hydroxide canisters used to remove carbon dioxide would have run out. On STS-107, Columbia was carrying the Extended Duration Orbiter pallet, which increased its supply of oxygen and hydrogen. To maximize the mission duration, non-essential systems would have been powered down, and animals in the Spacehab module would have been euthanized.

When STS-107 launched, Atlantis was undergoing preparation for the STS-114 launch on March 1, 2003. Had NASA management decided to launch a rescue mission, an expedited process could have begun to launch it as a rescue vehicle. Some pre-launch tests would have been eliminated to allow it to launch on time. Atlantis would have launched with additional equipment for EVAs, and launched with a minimum required crew. It would have rendezvoused with Columbia, and the STS-107 crew would have conducted EVAs to transfer to Atlantis. Columbia would have been deorbited remotely and disposed of in the Pacific Ocean, as landing the orbiter in a controlled manner required onboard piloting.

The CAIB also investigated the possibility of on-orbit repair of the left wing. Although there were no materials or adhesives onboard Columbia that could have survived reentry, the board researched the effectiveness of stuffing materials from the orbiter, crew cabin, or water into the RCC hole. They determined that the best option would have been to harvest tiles from other places on the orbiter, shape them, and then stuff them into the RCC hole. Given the difficulty of on-orbit repair and the risk of further damaging the RCC tiles, the CAIB determined that the likelihood of a successful on-orbit repair would have been low.

== NASA response ==
=== Space Shuttle updates ===
The Space Shuttle program was suspended after the loss of Columbia. The further construction of the International Space Station (ISS) was delayed, as the Space Shuttle had been scheduled for seven missions to the ISS in 2003 and 2004 to complete its construction. To prevent future foam strikes, the ET was redesigned to remove foam from the bipod. Instead, electric heaters were installed to prevent ice building up in the bipod due to the cold liquid oxygen in its feedlines. Additional heaters were also installed along the liquid oxygen line, which ran from the base of the tank to its interstage section. NASA also improved its ground imaging capabilities at Kennedy Space Center to better observe and monitor potential issues that occur during launch. The existing cameras at LC-39A and LC-39B, and along the coast were upgraded, and nine new camera sites were added. Cameras were added to the bellies of Discovery, Atlantis, and Endeavour (only Columbia and Challenger had them prior) to allow digital images of the ET to be viewed on the ground soon after launch. The prior system on Columbia used film and could only be downlinked after the orbiter returned to Earth. The Orbiter Boom Sensor System, a camera on the end of the Canadarm, was added to allow the crew to inspect the orbiter for any tile damage once they reached orbit. Each of the orbiter's wings was equipped with 22 temperature sensors to detect any breaches during reentry and with 66 accelerometers to detect an impact. Post-landing inspection procedures were updated to include technicians examining the RCC panels using flash thermography.

As well as the updates to the orbiter, NASA prepared contingency plans in the event that a mission would be unable to safely land. The plan involved the stranded mission docking with the ISS, on which the crew would inspect and attempt to repair the damaged orbiter. If they were unsuccessful, they would remain aboard the ISS and wait for a rescue. The rescue mission, designated STS-3xx, would be activated, and would use the next-in-line hardware for the orbiter, ET, and SRBs. The expected time to launch would be 35 days, as that was the requirement to prepare launch facilities. Before the arrival of the rescue mission, the stranded crew would power up the damaged orbiter, which would be remotely controlled as it was undocked and deorbited, and its debris would land in the Pacific Ocean. The minimal crew would launch, dock with the ISS, and spend a day transferring astronauts and equipment before undocking and landing.

=== First Return to Flight mission (STS-114) ===
The STS-114 ET losing a large piece of foam

The first Return to Flight mission, STS-114, began with the launch of Discovery on July 26, 2005, at 10:39 am (EDT). Sixteen pieces of foam from the ET were dislodged during the launch that were large enough to be considered significant by NASA investigators, including one piece that was approximately 36 by 11 inches (91 by 28 cm). Post-launch investigations did not find any indications of damage from the foam loss, but ET video did reveal that a small piece of TPS tile from the nose landing gear fell off during launch. Upon reaching orbit the crew inspected Discovery with the Orbiter Boom Sensor System. On July 29 Discovery rendezvoused with the ISS and, before docking, performed the first rendezvous pitch maneuver to allow the crew aboard the ISS to observe and photograph the orbiter's belly. The next day, astronauts Soichi Noguchi and Stephen Robinson performed the first of three spacewalks. They tested a tile repair tool, the Emittance Wash Applicator, on intentionally damaged TPS tiles that had been brought in the payload bay. On August 3 the same astronauts performed the third EVA of the mission, during which Robinson stood on the ISS's Canadarm2 and went to Discovery's belly to remove two gap fillers between tiles that had begun to protrude. After a delay due to bad weather at KSC, the decision was made to land at Edwards AFB. Discovery successfully landed at 8:11 am (EDT) on August 9. Had Discovery been unable to safely land, the crew would have remained on the ISS until Atlantis was flown to rescue them. As a result of the foam loss, NASA grounded the Space Shuttle fleet again.

=== Second Return to Flight mission (STS-121) ===
To address the problem of foam loss for the second Return to Flight mission (STS-121), NASA engineers removed the foam ramp from the protuberance air load (PAL) on the ET, which was the source of the largest piece of debris on STS-114. The launch was postponed from its scheduled launch of July 1, 2006, and again on July 2 due to inclement weather at KSC. On July 3 a piece of foam approximately 3 by 0.25 inches (7.62 by 0.64 cm) and weighing 0.091 ounces (2.6 g) broke off from the ET. The mission still launched as scheduled at 2:38 pm (EDT) on July 4. After reaching orbit, Discovery performed post-launch inspections of its TPS and docked with the ISS on July 6. The orbiter carried a 28-foot (8.5 m) remote control orbiter in-flight maintenance cable that could connect the flight deck systems to the avionics system in the mid-deck; it would allow the spacecraft to be landed remotely, to include controlling the landing gear and deploying the parachute. On July 12 astronauts Piers Sellers and Michael Fossum performed an EVA to test the NonOxide Adhesive eXperiment (NOAX), which applied protective sealant to samples of damaged TPS tiles. Discovery undocked from the ISS on July 14 and safely landed at 9:14 am on July 17 at KSC. Had the crew been stranded in orbit, NASA planned to launch Atlantis to rescue them from the ISS.

=== Program cancellation ===
In January 2004 President Bush announced the Vision for Space Exploration, calling for the Space Shuttle fleet to complete the ISS and be retired by 2010, to be replaced by a newly developed Crew Exploration Vehicle for travel to the Moon and Mars. In 2004, NASA Administrator Sean O'Keefe canceled a planned servicing of the Hubble Space Telescope and decided that future missions would all rendezvous with the ISS to ensure the safety of the crew. In 2006, his successor, Michael Griffin, decided to have one more servicing mission to the telescope, STS-125, which flew in May 2009. The retirement of the Space Shuttle was delayed until 2011, after which no further crewed spacecraft were launched from the United States until 2020 when SpaceX's Crew Dragon Demo-2 mission successfully carried NASA astronauts Doug Hurley and Robert Behnken to the ISS.

== Legacy ==
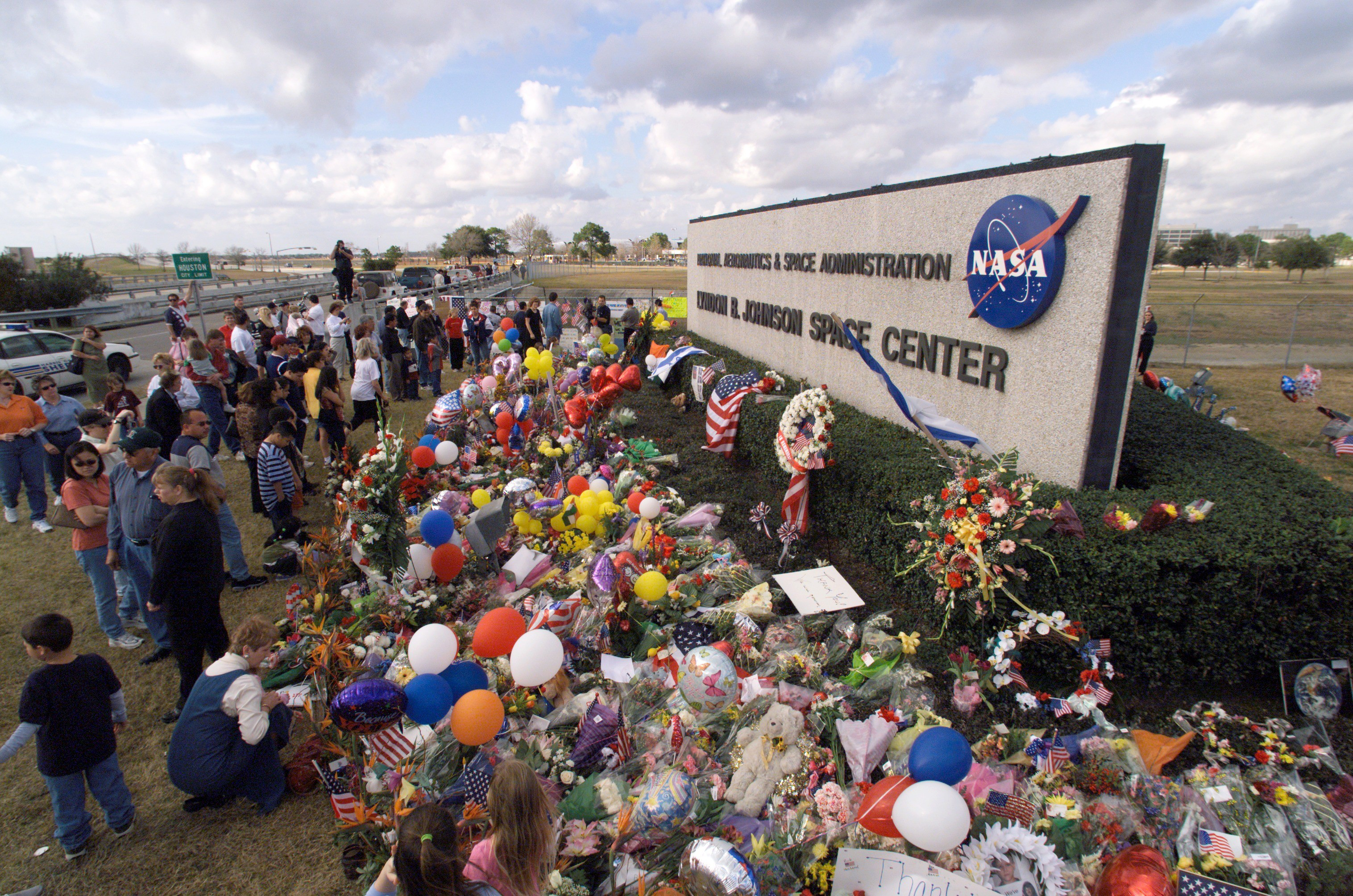
A makeshift memorial at the main entrance to the Johnson Space Center in Houston, Texas

External videos
- Shuttle Columbia Memorial Service, National Cathedral, February 6, 2003, C-SPAN

On February 4, 2003, President Bush and his wife Laura led a memorial service for the astronauts' families at the Johnson Space Center. Two days later, Vice President Dick Cheney and his wife Lynne led a similar service at Washington National Cathedral. Patti LaBelle sang "Way Up There" as part of the service. A memorial service was held at KSC on February 7; Robert Crippen, the first pilot of Columbia, gave a eulogy for the crew and a tribute for Columbia herself, acknowledging her achievements as the first orbiter and NASA's flagship, her role in trying desperately to save the crew on STS-107, and her many missions dedicated to scientific research. On October 28, 2003, the names of the crew were added to the Space Mirror Memorial at the KSC Visitor Complex in Merritt Island, Florida, alongside the names of 17 other astronauts and cosmonauts who have died in the line of duty. On February 2, 2004, NASA Administrator O'Keefe unveiled a memorial for the STS-107 crew at Arlington National Cemetery, and it is located near the Challenger memorial. A tree for each astronaut was planted in NASA's Astronaut Memorial Grove at the Johnson Space Center, along with trees for each astronaut from the Apollo 1 and Challenger disasters. The exhibit Forever Remembered at KSC Visitor Complex features the cockpit window frames from Columbia. In 2004, Bush conferred posthumous Congressional Space Medals of Honor to all 14 crew members killed in the Challenger and Columbia accidents.

NASA named several places in honor of Columbia and the crew. Seven asteroids discovered in July 2001 were named after astronauts: 51823 Rickhusband, 51824 Mikeanderson, 51825 Davidbrown, 51826 Kalpanachawla, 51827 Laurelclark, 51828 Ilanramon, 51829 Williemccool. On Mars, the landing site of the rover Spirit was named Columbia Memorial Station, and included a memorial plaque to the Columbia crew mounted on the back of the high gain antenna. A complex of seven hills east of the Spirit landing site was dubbed the Columbia Hills; each of the seven hills was individually named for a member of the crew, and the rover explored the summit of Husband Hill in 2005. In 2006, the IAU approved naming seven lunar craters after the astronauts.

In February 2006, NASA's National Scientific Balloon Facility was renamed the Columbia Scientific Balloon Facility. A supercomputer built in 2004 at the NASA Advanced Supercomputing Division was named "Columbia". The first part of the system, named "Kalpana", was dedicated to Chawla, who had worked at the Ames Research Center before joining the Space Shuttle program. The first dedicated meteorological satellite launched by the Indian Space Research Organisation (ISRO), Metsat-1, was renamed to Kalpana-1 on February 5, 2003, after Chawla.

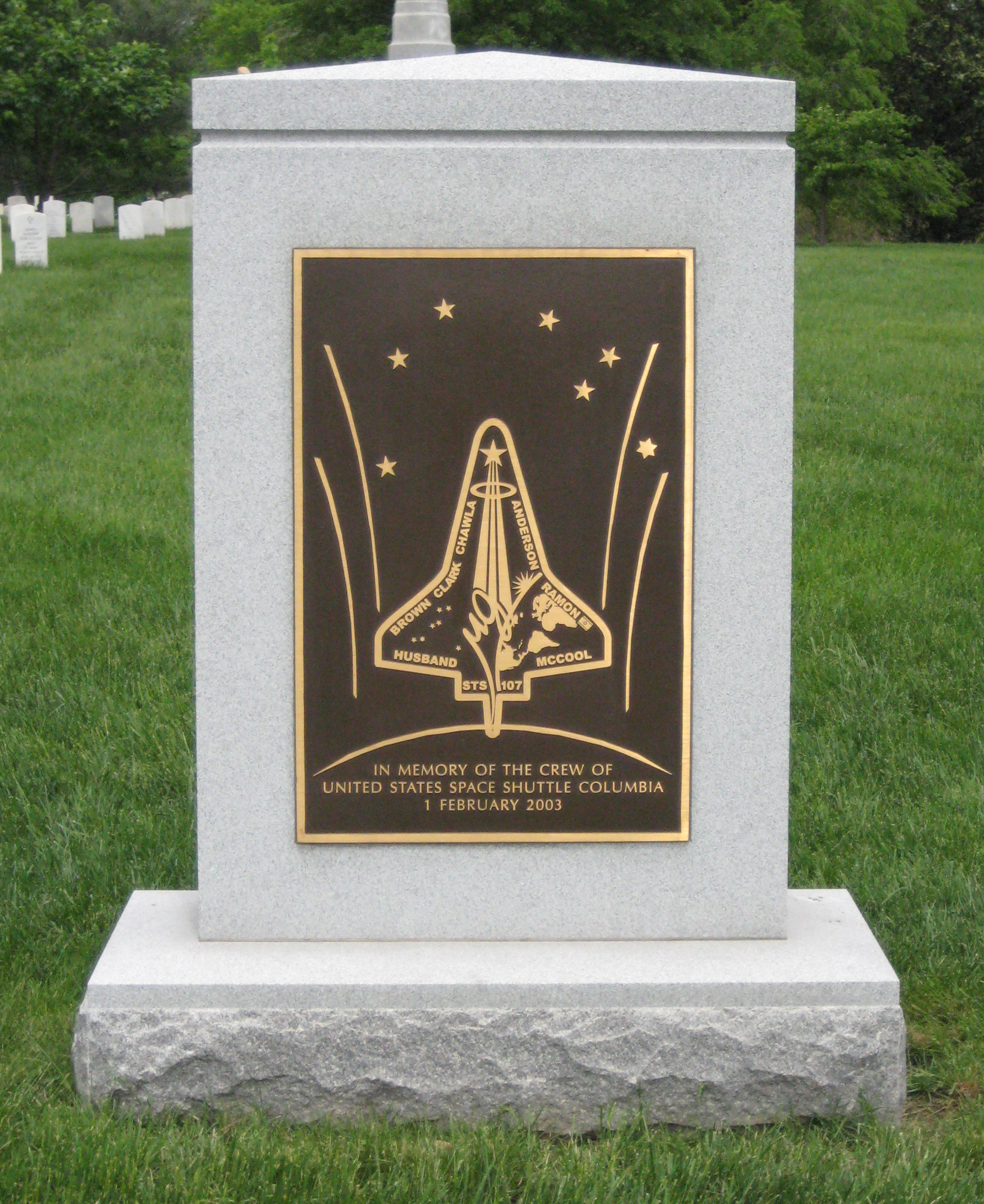
Columbia memorial in Arlington National Cemetery.

In 2003, the airport in Amarillo, Texas, where Husband was from, was renamed to the Rick Husband Amarillo International Airport. A mountain peak in the Sangre de Cristo Range in the Colorado Rockies was renamed Columbia Point in 2003. In October 2004, both houses of Congress passed a resolution to change the name of Downey, California's Space Science Learning Center to the Columbia Memorial Space Center, which is located at the former manufacturing site of the Space Shuttle orbiters.

On April 1, 2003, the Opening Day of baseball season, the Houston Astros honored the Columbia crew by having seven simultaneous first pitches thrown by family and friends of the crew. During the singing of the national anthem, 107 NASA personnel carried a US flag onto the field. The Astros wore the mission patch on their sleeves the entire season. On February 1, 2004, the first anniversary of the Columbia disaster, Super Bowl XXXVIII held in Houston's Reliant Stadium began with a pregame tribute to the crew of the Columbia by singer Josh Groban performing "You Raise Me Up", with the crew of STS-114 in attendance.

In 2004, two space journalists, Michael Cabbage and William Harwood, released their book, Comm Check: The Final Flight of Shuttle Columbia. It discusses the history of the Space Shuttle program, and documents the post-disaster recovery and investigation efforts. Michael Leinbach, a retired Launch Director at KSC who was working on the day of the disaster, released Bringing Columbia Home: The Untold Story of a Lost Space Shuttle and Her Crew in 2018. It documents his personal experience during the disaster, and the debris and remains recovery efforts.

In 2004, the documentary Columbia: The Tragic Loss was released; it told of the life of Ilan Ramon and focused on the issues in NASA management that led to the disaster. PBS released a Nova documentary, Space Shuttle Disaster, in 2008. It featured commentary from NASA officials and space experts, and discussed historical issues with the spacecraft and NASA.

The Scottish Celtic-Rock band Runrig included a song titled "Somewhere" on their album The Story that ends with a recording of a radio communication from Laurel Clark. Clark, who had become a fan of the band when she lived in Scotland, had a Runrig song "Running to the Light" play as her wakeup music on January 27; her CD of The Stamping Ground was recovered in the debris and presented to the band by Clark's husband and son.

== See also ==
- Criticism of the Space Shuttle program
- Engineering disasters
- Expedition 6
- List of spaceflight-related accidents and incidents
