= 51828 Ilanramon =

Main-belt asteroid

Discovery
- Discovered by: NEAT
- Discovery site: Palomar Obs.
- Discovery date: 20 July 2001

Designations
- Pronunciation: /iːˌlɑːnˈrəmoʊn/
- Named after: Ilan Ramon (Israeli astronaut)
- Alternative designations: 2001 OU_{39}
- Minor planet category: main-belt · (middle); Gefion

Orbital characteristics
- Epoch 4 September 2017 (JD 2458000.5)
- Uncertainty parameter 0
- Observation arc: 26.95 yr (9,844 days)
- Aphelion: 3.1311 AU
- Perihelion: 2.4181 AU
- Semi-major axis: 2.7746 AU
- Eccentricity: 0.1285
- Orbital period (sidereal): 4.62 yr (1,688 days)
- Mean anomaly: 76.382°
- Mean motion: 0° 12^{m} 47.88^{s} / day
- Inclination: 9.4769°
- Longitude of ascending node: 41.712°
- Argument of perihelion: 42.469°

Physical characteristics
- Dimensions: 5.549±0.904 km 9.24 km (calculated)
- Synodic rotation period: 3.61±0.43 h
- Geometric albedo: 0.057 (assumed); 0.1899±0.1093
- Spectral type: C (assumed)
- Absolute magnitude (H): 13.7 · 13.9 · 14.03±0.35

51828 Ilanramon (provisional designation 2001 OU_{39}) is a Gefionian asteroid from the central regions of the asteroid belt, approximately 5.5 kilometers in diameter. It was discovered on 20 July 2001, by astronomers of the Near-Earth Asteroid Tracking program at Palomar Observatory in California, United States. The asteroid was named in memory of Israeli astronaut Ilan Ramon, who died in the Space Shuttle Columbia disaster.

== Orbit and classification ==
Ilanramon is a member of the Gefion family (516), a large asteroid family named after 1272 Gefion. It orbits the Sun in the intermediate main-belt at a distance of 2.4–3.1 AU once every 4 years and 7 months (1,688 days; semi-major axis of 2.77 AU). Its orbit has an eccentricity of 0.13 and an inclination of 9° with respect to the ecliptic.

The asteroid's observation arc begins with a precovery from the Digitized Sky Survey taken at Palomar in May 1990, nearly 11 years prior to the body's official discovery observation.

== Physical characteristics ==
Ilanramon is an assumed C-type asteroid, but its membership to the Gefion family and its relatively high albedo (see below) measured by the Wide-field Infrared Survey Explorer (WISE), indicate that it is likely a stony S-type asteroid.

=== Rotation period ===
In February 2016, a rotational lightcurve of Ilanramon was obtained from photometric observations by a group of Hungarian astronomers based on the Kepler space telescope's K2-mission. Lightcurve analysis gave a short rotation period of 3.61 hours with a brightness amplitude of 0.88 magnitude, indicative for a non-spherical shape (U=2).

=== Diameter and albedo ===
According to the survey carried out by the NEOWISE mission of NASA's WISE telescope, Ilanramon measures 5.549 kilometers in diameter and its surface has an albedo of 0.1899, while the Collaborative Asteroid Lightcurve Link assumes a standard albedo for carbonaceous asteroids of 0.057 and consequently calculates a larger diameter of 9.24 kilometers based on an absolute magnitude of 13.9.

== Naming ==
This minor planet was named after Israeli astronaut and payload specialist Ilan Ramon (1954–2003), who was killed in the Space Shuttle Columbia disaster on 1 February 2003. The approved naming citation was published by the Minor Planet Center on 6 August 2003 (M.P.C. 49283).

The following asteroids were also named in memory of the other six members of STS-107: 51823 Rickhusband, 51824 Mikeanderson, 51825 Davidbrown, 51826 Kalpanachawla, 51827 Laurelclark and 51829 Williemccool.
