= 51824 Mikeanderson =

Main-belt asteroid

Discovery
- Discovered by: NEAT
- Discovery site: Palomar Obs.
- Discovery date: 19 July 2001

Designations
- Named after: Michael P. Anderson (American astronaut)
- Alternative designations: 2001 OE_{30} · 1997 UJ_{24}
- Minor planet category: main-belt · (outer); Eos

Orbital characteristics
- Epoch 4 September 2017 (JD 2458000.5)
- Uncertainty parameter 0
- Observation arc: 56.95 yr (20,802 days)
- Aphelion: 3.3400 AU
- Perihelion: 2.6702 AU
- Semi-major axis: 3.0051 AU
- Eccentricity: 0.1114
- Orbital period (sidereal): 5.21 yr (1,903 days)
- Mean anomaly: 2.6722°
- Mean motion: 0° 11^{m} 21.12^{s} / day
- Inclination: 9.7722°
- Longitude of ascending node: 334.41°
- Argument of perihelion: 358.39°

Physical characteristics
- Dimensions: 4.969±1.041 km
- Geometric albedo: 0.149±0.061
- Absolute magnitude (H): 14.4

51824 Mikeanderson (provisional designation 2001 OE_{30}) is an Eoan asteroid in the outer region of the asteroid belt, approximately 5 kilometers in diameter. It was discovered on 19 July 2001, by astronomers of the Near-Earth Asteroid Tracking program at Palomar Observatory in California, United States. The asteroid was named for American astronaut and mission payload commander Mike Anderson, who died in the Space Shuttle Columbia disaster.

== Orbit and classification ==
Mikeanderson is a member the Eos family (606), the largest asteroid family in the outer asteroid belt consisting of nearly 10,000 asteroids. It orbits the Sun in the outer main-belt at a distance of 2.7–3.3 AU once every 5 years and 3 months (1,903 days; semi-major axis of 3.01 AU). Its orbit has an eccentricity of 0.11 and an inclination of 10° with respect to the ecliptic.

The body's observation arc begins with a precovery taken at Palomar Observatory in October 1960, more than 40 years prior to its official discovery observation.

== Physical characteristics ==
The asteroid's spectral type is unknown. Typically, members of the Eos family are K-type asteroids. Mikeanderson's measured albedo also agrees with this spectral classification (see below).

=== Rotation period ===
As of 2017, no rotational lightcurve of Mikeanderson has been obtained from photometric observations. The asteroid's rotation period, poles and shape remain unknown.

=== Diameter and albedo ===
According to the survey carried out by the NEOWISE mission of NASA's Wide-field Infrared Survey Explorer, Mikeanderson measures 4.969 kilometers in diameter and its surface has an albedo of 0.149.

== Naming ==
This minor planet was named after Michael P. Anderson (1959–2003), an American astronaut and payload commander of the Columbia Space Shuttle who was killed in the STS-107 reentry disaster on 1 February 2003. The approved naming citation was published by the Minor Planet Center on 6 August 2003 (M.P.C. 49283).

The following asteroids were named in memory of the other six members of STS-107: 51823 Rickhusband, 51825 Davidbrown, 51826 Kalpanachawla, 51827 Laurelclark, 51828 Ilanramon and 51829 Williemccool.
