= 51827 Laurelclark =

Main-belt asteroid

Discovery
- Discovered by: NEAT
- Discovery site: Palomar Obs.
- Discovery date: 20 July 2001

Designations
- Named after: Laurel Clark (American astronaut)
- Alternative designations: 2001 OH_{38} · 1999 GH_{23}
- Minor planet category: main-belt · (outer) background

Orbital characteristics
- Epoch 4 September 2017 (JD 2458000.5)
- Uncertainty parameter 0
- Observation arc: 26.09 yr (9,529 days)
- Aphelion: 3.4741 AU
- Perihelion: 2.5885 AU
- Semi-major axis: 3.0313 AU
- Eccentricity: 0.1461
- Orbital period (sidereal): 5.28 yr (1,928 days)
- Mean anomaly: 239.89°
- Mean motion: 0° 11^{m} 12.48^{s} / day
- Inclination: 10.234°
- Longitude of ascending node: 10.644°
- Argument of perihelion: 92.486°

Physical characteristics
- Dimensions: 6.005±0.489 km
- Geometric albedo: 0.162±0.016
- Absolute magnitude (H): 14.1

51827 Laurelclark (provisional designation 2001 OH_{38}) is a background asteroid from the outer regions of the asteroid belt, approximately 6 kilometers in diameter. It was discovered on 20 July 2001, by astronomers of the Near-Earth Asteroid Tracking program at Palomar Observatory in California, United States. The asteroid was named for astronaut Laurel Clark, who died in the Space Shuttle Columbia disaster.

== Orbit and classification ==
Laurelclark is a non-family asteroid from the main belt's background population. It orbits the Sun in the outer asteroid belt at a distance of 2.6–3.5 AU once every 5 years and 3 months (1,928 days; semi-major axis of 3.03 AU). Its orbit has an eccentricity of 0.15 and an inclination of 10° with respect to the ecliptic.

The body's observation arc begins with its first observation by Spacewatch at Kitt Peak National Observatory in October 1991, almost 10 years prior to its official discovery observation by NEAT at Palomar.

== Physical characteristics ==
=== Rotation period ===
As of 2017, no rotational lightcurve of Laurelclark has been obtained from photometric observations. The asteroid's rotation period, poles and shape remain unknown.

=== Diameter and albedo ===
According to the survey carried out by the NEOWISE mission of NASA's Wide-field Infrared Survey Explorer, Laurelclark measures 6.005 kilometers in diameter and its surface has an albedo of 0.162.

== Naming ==
This minor planet was named after American astronaut and mission specialist Laurel Clark (1961–2003), who was killed in the reentry disaster of Space Shuttle Columbia on 1 February 2003. The approved naming citation was published by the Minor Planet Center on 6 August 2003 (M.P.C. 49283).

The following asteroids were named in memory of the other six members of STS-107: 51823 Rickhusband, 51824 Mikeanderson, 51825 Davidbrown, 51826 Kalpanachawla, 51828 Ilanramon and 51829 Williemccool.
