= 51826 Kalpanachawla =

Main-belt asteroid

Discovery
- Discovered by: NEAT
- Discovery site: Palomar Obs.
- Discovery date: 19 July 2001

Designations
- Pronunciation: /ˌkɑːlpənəˈtʃɑːvlə/
- Named after: Kalpana Chawla (Indo-American astronaut)
- Alternative designations: 2001 OB_{34} · 1999 FB_{57}
- Minor planet category: main-belt · (outer); Eos

Orbital characteristics
- Epoch 4 September 2017 (JD 2458000.5)
- Uncertainty parameter 0
- Observation arc: 22.15 yr (8,090 days)
- Aphelion: 3.3368 AU
- Perihelion: 2.8107 AU
- Semi-major axis: 3.0737 AU
- Eccentricity: 0.0856
- Orbital period (sidereal): 5.39 yr (1,968 days)
- Mean anomaly: 249.53°
- Mean motion: 0° 10^{m} 58.44^{s} / day
- Inclination: 9.5889°
- Longitude of ascending node: 14.167°
- Argument of perihelion: 50.931°

Physical characteristics
- Dimensions: 6.947±0.799 km
- Geometric albedo: 0.160±0.057
- Absolute magnitude (H): 14.1

51826 Kalpanachawla (provisional designation 2001 OB_{34}) is an Eoan asteroid in the outer region of the asteroid belt, approximately 7 kilometers in diameter. It was discovered on 19 July 2001, by astronomers of the Near-Earth Asteroid Tracking program at Palomar Observatory in California, United States. The asteroid was named for Indo-American astronaut and mission specialist Kalpana Chawla, who died in the Space Shuttle Columbia disaster.

== Orbit and classification ==
Kalpanachawla is a member the Eos family (606), the largest family in the outer asteroid belt consisting of nearly 10,000 asteroids. It orbits the Sun in the outer asteroid belt at a distance of 2.8–3.3 AU once every 5 years and 5 months (1,968 days; semi-major axis of 3.07 AU). Its orbit has an eccentricity of 0.09 and an inclination of 10° with respect to the ecliptic.

The body's observation arc begins with a precovery taken by Spacewatch at Kitt Peak Observatory in April 1994, more than 7 years prior to its official discovery observation at Palomar.

== Physical characteristics ==
The asteroid's spectral type is unknown. Members of the Eos family are typically K-type asteroids.

=== Diameter and albedo ===
According to the survey carried out by the NEOWISE mission of NASA's Wide-field Infrared Survey Explorer, Kalpanachawla measures 6.947 kilometers in diameter and its surface has an albedo of 0.160.

=== Rotation period ===
As of 2017, no rotational lightcurve of Kalpanachawla has been obtained from photometric observations. The asteroid's rotation period, poles and shape remain unknown.

== Naming ==
This minor planet was named after Indo-American astronaut and mission specialist Kalpana Chawla, who died in the Space Shuttle Columbia disaster on 1 February 2003. The approved naming citation was published by the Minor Planet Center on 6 August 2003 (M.P.C. 49283). The following asteroids were also named in memory of the other six members of STS-107: 51823 Rickhusband, 51824 Mikeanderson, 51825 Davidbrown, 51827 Laurelclark, 51828 Ilanramon and 51829 Williemccool.
