= 50719 Elizabethgriffin =

Main-belt asteroid

Discovery
- Discovered by: CSS
- Discovery site: Mount Lemmon Obs.
- Discovery date: 1 March 2000

Designations
- Named after: Elizabeth Griffin (Canadian astronomer)
- Alternative designations: 2000 EG_{140} · 2001 MV_{3}
- Minor planet category: main-belt · Maria

Orbital characteristics
- Epoch 27 April 2019 (JD 2458600.5)
- Uncertainty parameter 0
- Observation arc: 19.92 yr (7,276 d)
- Aphelion: 2.9305 AU
- Perihelion: 2.2365 AU
- Semi-major axis: 2.5835 AU
- Eccentricity: 0.1343
- Orbital period (sidereal): 4.15 yr (1,517 d)
- Mean anomaly: 73.206°
- Mean motion: 0° 14^{m} 14.64^{s} / day
- Inclination: 14.303°
- Longitude of ascending node: 262.84°
- Argument of perihelion: 30.265°

Physical characteristics
- Mean diameter: 3.307±0.134 km
- Synodic rotation period: 1256.0159±63.4351 h
- Geometric albedo: 0.370±0.065
- Spectral type: S
- Absolute magnitude (H): 14.1; 14.2; 14.204±0.004 (R)

50719 Elizabethgriffin (provisional designation 2000 EG_{140}) is a stony Maria asteroid and exceptionally slow rotator from the central region of the asteroid belt, approximately 3.3 kilometers (2.1 miles) in diameter. It was discovered on 1 March 2000, by astronomers with the Catalina Sky Survey at Mount Lemmon Observatory, Arizona, United States. It was named for Canadian astronomer Elizabeth Griffin.

== Classification and orbit ==
Elizabethgriffin is a stony S-type asteroid and a member of the Maria family (506), located in the Eunomia region in the intermediate main belt. It orbits the Sun in the central main belt at a distance of 2.2–2.9 Astronomical units (AU) once every 4 years and 2 months (1,517 days; semi-major axis of 2.58 AU). Its orbit has an eccentricity of 0.13 and an inclination of 14° with respect to the ecliptic. A first precovery was taken at Lowell Observatory (LONEOS) in 1998, extending the asteroid's observation arc by 2 years prior to its discovery.

== Numbering and naming ==
This minor planet was numbered by the Minor Planet Center on 20 November 2002. It was named after Elizabeth Griffin (born 1942) a Canadian astronomer who studies binary stars spectroscopically. She has been an advocate for the preservation and digitization of astronomic photographic plates. The official naming citation was published by the Minor Planet Center on 6 April 2019 (M.P.C. 112432).

== Physical characteristics ==
=== Slow rotator ===
In August 2010, a rotational lightcurve of Elizabethgriffin was obtained from photometric observations by astronomers at the Palomar Transient Factory in California. It gave an exceptionally long rotation period of 1256 hours with a brightness variation of 0.42 magnitude (U=2). This makes the asteroid the 5th slowest rotating minor planet known to exist.

=== Diameter and albedo ===
According to the surveys carried out by the NEOWISE mission of NASA's Wide-field Infrared Survey Explorer, Elizabethgriffin measures 3.3 kilometers in diameter and its surface has an albedo of 0.37, while the Collaborative Asteroid Lightcurve Link assumes a standard albedo for stony asteroids of 0.21 and calculates a diameter of 3.4 kilometers with an absolute magnitude of 14.65.
