= David M. Brown =

American astronaut (1956–2003)

David Brown
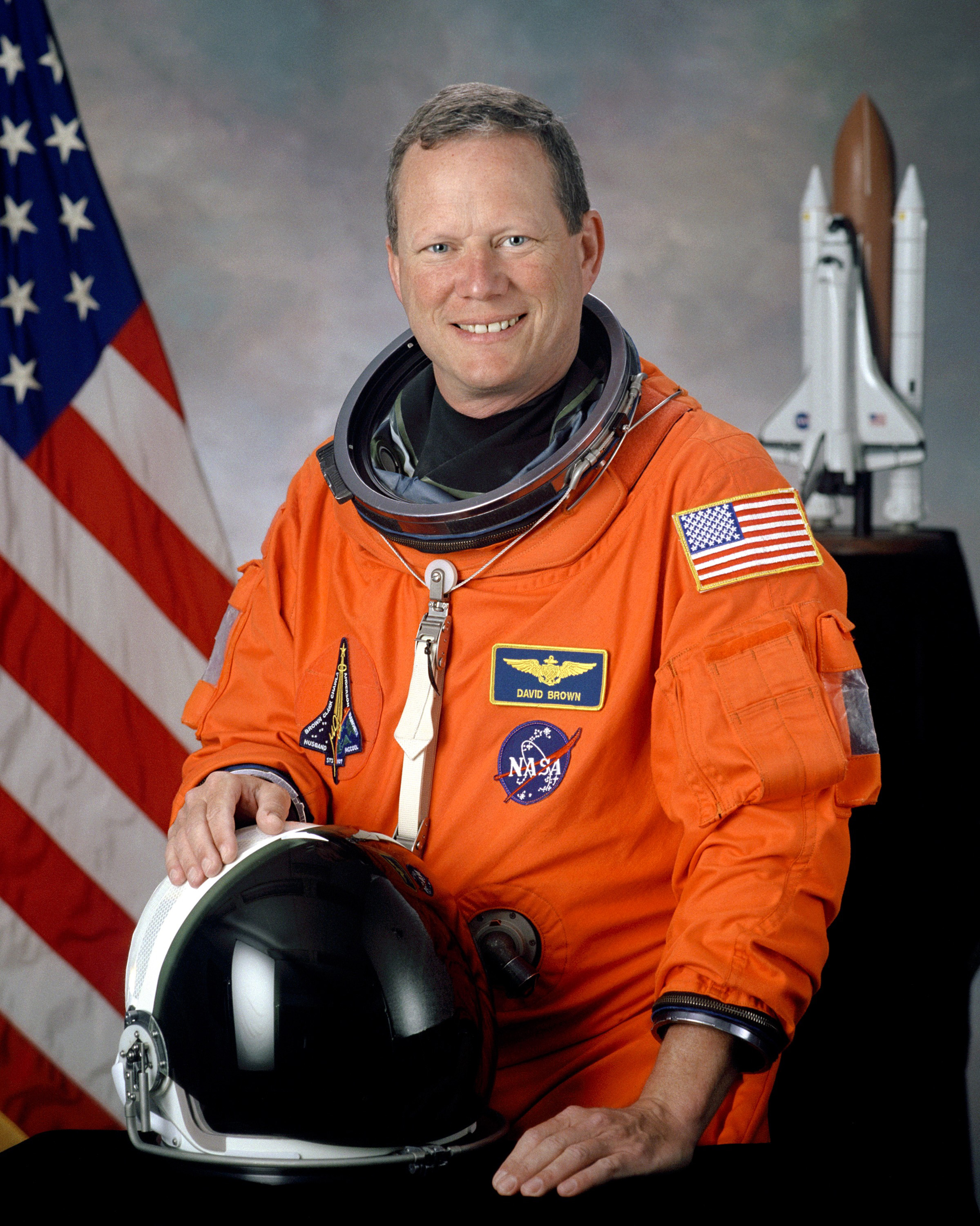
- Brown in 2001
- Born: David McDowell Brown; April 16, 1956; Arlington, Virginia, U.S.
- Died: February 1, 2003 (aged 46); Over Texas, U.S.
- Cause of death: Space Shuttle Columbia disaster
- Education: College of William & Mary (BS); Eastern Virginia Medical School (MD)
- Awards: Congressional Space Medal of Honor; NASA Distinguished Service Medal
- Space career

NASA astronaut
- Rank: Captain, USN
- Time in space: 15d 22h 20m
- Selection: NASA Group 16 (1996)
- Missions: STS-107

David McDowell Brown (April 16, 1956 – February 1, 2003) was a United States Navy captain and NASA astronaut. He died on his first spaceflight, when the Space Shuttle Columbia (STS-107) disintegrated during orbital reentry into the Earth's atmosphere. Brown became an astronaut in 1996 but had not served on a space mission prior to the Columbia disaster. He was posthumously awarded the Congressional Space Medal of Honor.

== Early life and education ==
Brown was born on April 16, 1956, in Arlington, Virginia. As a youth, he attended McKinley Elementary School and Swanson Middle School, and graduated from Yorktown High School in Arlington in 1974. Brown was a member of the Boy Scouts of America and achieved its second-highest rank, Life Scout. He received a Bachelor of Science degree in biology from the College of William & Mary in 1978, and a Doctor of Medicine from the Eastern Virginia Medical School in 1982.

== Military career ==
Brown joined the U.S. Navy after his internship at the Medical University of South Carolina. Upon completion of flight surgeon training in 1984, Brown reported to the Navy Branch Hospital in Adak, Alaska, as Director of Medical Services. He was then assigned to Carrier Air Wing Fifteen which deployed aboard the aircraft carrier USS Carl Vinson in the Western Pacific. In 1988, Brown became the only flight surgeon in a 10-year period to be chosen for pilot training. He was ultimately designated a Naval Aviator in 1990 at NAS Chase Field in Beeville, Texas, ranking number one in his class. Brown was then sent for training and carrier qualification in the A-6E Intruder. In 1991, he reported to the Naval Strike Warfare Center at NAS Fallon, Nevada, serving as a Strike Leader Attack Training Syllabus Instructor and a Contingency Cell Planning Officer. Brown was also qualified in the F/A-18 Hornet and deployed from Japan in 1992 aboard USS Independence flying the A-6E with VA-115. In 1995, he reported to the U.S. Naval Test Pilot School at NAS Patuxent River, Maryland as their flight surgeon, where Brown also flew the T-38 Talon.

Brown logged over 2,700 flight hours, with 1,700 in high-performance military aircraft. He was qualified as the first pilot in NASA T-38 aircraft and held a Federal Communications Commission (FCC) issued Technician Class amateur radio license with the call sign KC5ZTC.

Brown also served as President of the International Association of Military Flight Surgeon Pilots, an associate fellow at the Aerospace Medical Association, and a member of the Society of U.S. Naval Flight Surgeons.

== NASA career ==
Selected by NASA in April 1996, Brown reported to the Johnson Space Center in August 1996. He completed two years of training and evaluation and was qualified for flight assignment as a mission specialist. Brown was initially assigned to support payload development for the International Space Station, followed by the astronaut support team responsible for orbiter cockpit setup, crew strap-in, and landing recovery.

On April 21, 2001, Brown appeared on ESPN as an expert on g-force loading on the human body that led to the cancellation of the Firestone Firehawk 600 CART race.

Brown flew aboard Space Shuttle Columbia on STS-107, logging 15 days, 22 hours, and 20 minutes in space from January 16 to February 1, 2003. The flight was a dedicated science and research mission. Working 24 hours a day, in two alternating shifts, the crew successfully conducted approximately 80 experiments. On February 1, 2003, all seven members of Columbia's crew perished during reentry, 16 minutes before the scheduled landing.

== Personal life ==
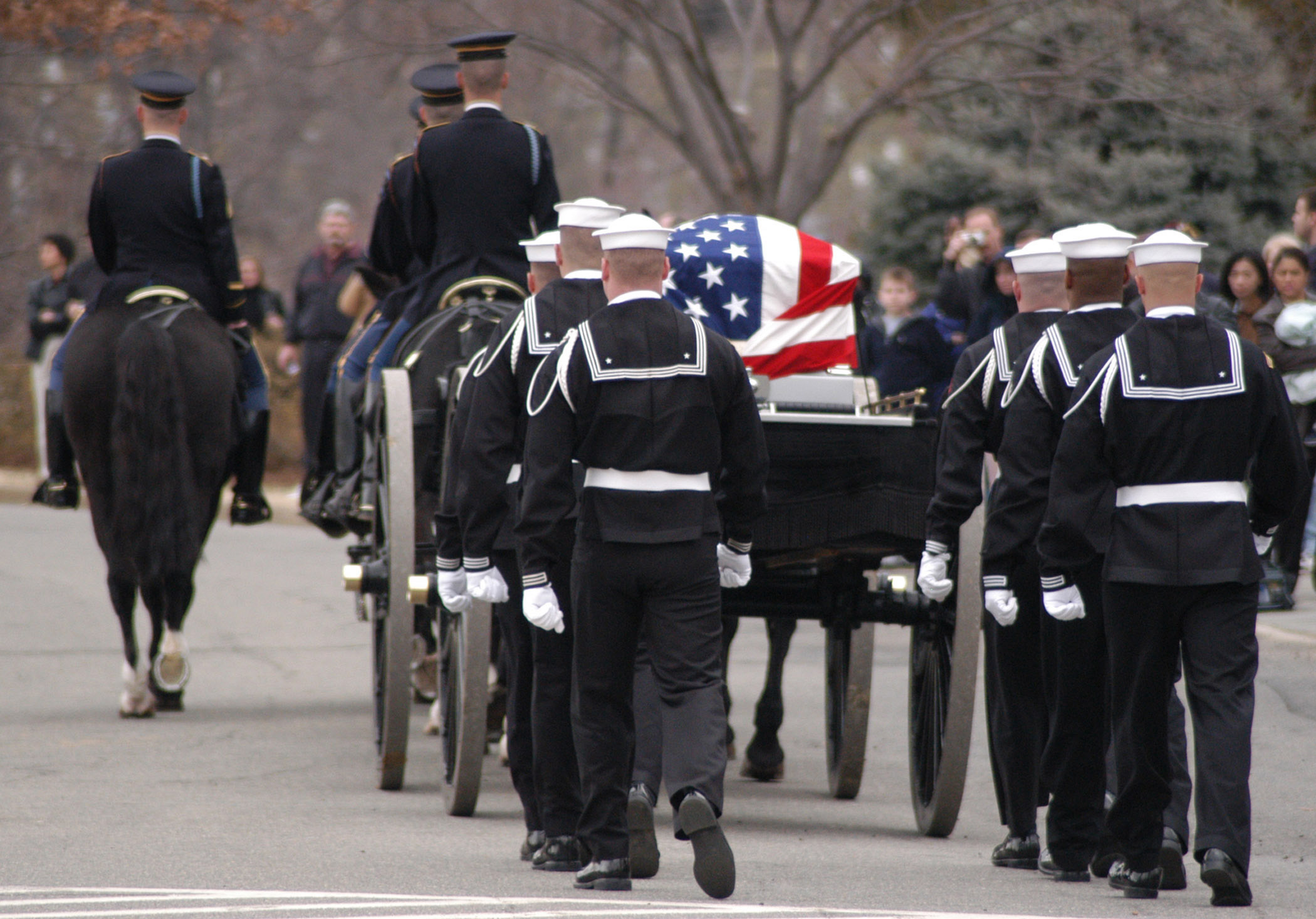
Brown's funeral services at Arlington National Cemetery on March 12, 2003

The only unmarried member of the STS-107 crew, Brown had previously been romantically involved with NASA engineer Ann Micklos. The couple ended their relationship shortly before the mission and remained close friends until his death. The crew of STS-107 had formed a close friendship during their training, and Brown had been preparing a video to commemorate this once they returned from the mission. He is buried in Arlington National Cemetery.

== Awards and honors ==
Brown, the 1986 recipient of the Navy Operational Flight Surgeon of the Year award, received numerous decorations including:

=== Qualification insignia ===
- Naval Aviator
- Naval Astronaut
- Naval Flight Surgeon

=== Personal decorations ===
- Defense Distinguished Service Medal ^{†}
- Meritorious Service Medal
- Navy and Marine Corps Achievement Medal
- National Defense Service Medal
- Congressional Space Medal of Honor ^{†}
- NASA Distinguished Service Medal ^{†}
- NASA Space Flight Medal ^{†}

The ^{†} symbol indicates a posthumous award.

== Tributes ==
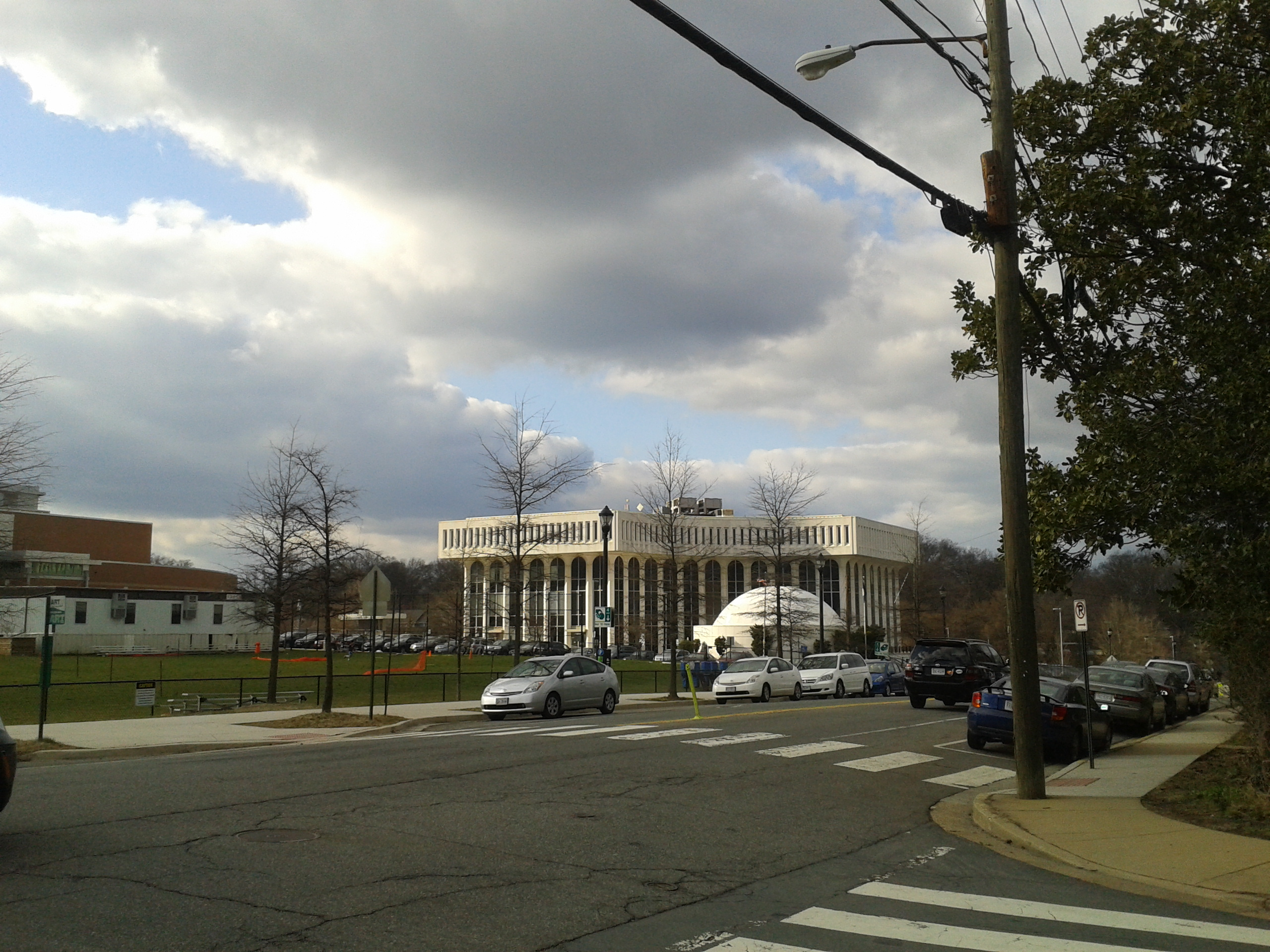
The David M. Brown Planetarium in Arlington County, Virginia

- Asteroid 51825 Davidbrown was named in honor of Brown.
- Lunar crater D. Brown is named after Brown.
- Brown Hall, in the Columbia Village apartments, at the Florida Institute of Technology is named after him.
- He is the first person to be posthumously awarded the William & Mary Alumni Association's Alumni Medal.
- The Laurel B. Clark and David M. Brown Aerospace Medicine Academic Center, located at the Naval Aerospace Medical Institute, is named after him.
- The Captain David Brown Aerospace and Medical Research Endowment was established in his memory to help deserving students attending Eastern Virginia Medical School.
- The planetarium of Arlington Public Schools, from which Brown graduated, was renamed the David M. Brown Planetarium.
- The Dave Brown Memorial Park in Friendswood, Texas, is named after him.
- The annual Astronaut Dave Brown Memorial gymnastics meet is held at the College of William & Mary in his honor, where Dave Brown was a gymnast.
- Yorktown High School Crew Team Men's Varsity 8 boat name Captain David M. Brown - c. 2003
- Circle Oil Hill Elementary of Circle USD 375 in Kansas grants a scholarship each year - David Brown Hopes & Dreams Scholarship. This scholarship was first awarded in 2005.

== See also ==
- Space science
- Space Shuttle Columbia disaster
