= 51823 Rickhusband =

Main-belt asteroid

Discovery
- Discovered by: NEAT
- Discovery site: Palomar Obs.
- Discovery date: 18 July 2001

Designations
- Named after: Rick Husband (American astronaut)
- Alternative designations: 2001 OY_{28} · 1994 JM_{7} 2000 KM_{25}
- Minor planet category: main-belt · (outer); Lixiaohua

Orbital characteristics
- Epoch 4 September 2017 (JD 2458000.5)
- Uncertainty parameter 0
- Observation arc: 22.10 yr (8,073 days)
- Aphelion: 3.8268 AU
- Perihelion: 2.4604 AU
- Semi-major axis: 3.1436 AU
- Eccentricity: 0.2173
- Orbital period (sidereal): 5.57 yr (2,036 days)
- Mean anomaly: 244.46°
- Mean motion: 0° 10^{m} 36.48^{s} / day
- Inclination: 11.556°
- Longitude of ascending node: 58.048°
- Argument of perihelion: 347.14°

Physical characteristics
- Dimensions: 8.731±0.159 km
- Geometric albedo: 0.048±0.005
- Absolute magnitude (H): 14.3

51823 Rickhusband (provisional designation 2001 OY_{28}) is a dark Lixiaohua asteroid from the outer regions of the asteroid belt, approximately 9 kilometers in diameter.

It was discovered on 18 July 2001, by astronomers of the Near-Earth Asteroid Tracking at Palomar Observatory in California, United States. The asteroid was named after American astronaut Rick Husband, who died in the Space Shuttle Columbia disaster.

== Orbit and classification ==
Rickhusband is a member of the Lixiaohua family, an outer-belt asteroid family of more than 700 known members, which consists of C- and X-type asteroids.

It orbits the Sun in the outer main-belt at a distance of 2.5–3.8 AU once every 5 years and 7 months (2,036 days). Its orbit has an eccentricity of 0.22 and an inclination of 12° with respect to the ecliptic.

The body's observation arc begins with its first identification as 1994 JM_{7} by Spacewatch at Kitt Peak Observatory in May 1994, more than 7 years prior to its official discovery observation by NEAT.

== Physical characteristics ==
=== Rotation period ===
As of 2017, no rotational lightcurve of Rickhusband has been obtained from photometric observations. The asteroid's rotation period, poles and shape remains unknown.

=== Diameter and albedo ===
According to the survey carried out by the NEOWISE mission of NASA's Wide-field Infrared Survey Explorer, Rickhusband measures 8.731 kilometers in diameter and its surface has an albedo of 0.048.

== Naming ==
This minor planet was named in memory of American astronaut Rick Husband (1957–2003), who was the commander of STS-107 and was killed in the Space Shuttle Columbia disaster on 1 February 2003. The official naming citation was published by the Minor Planet Center on 6 August 2003 (M.P.C. 49283).
