= Meanings of minor-planet names: 47001–48000 =

As minor planet discoveries are confirmed, they are given a permanent number by the IAU's Minor Planet Center (MPC), and the discoverers can then submit names for them, following the IAU's naming conventions. The list below concerns those minor planets in the specified number-range that have received names, and explains the meanings of those names.

Official naming citations of newly named small Solar System bodies are approved and published in a bulletin by IAU's Working Group for Small Bodies Nomenclature (WGSBN). Before May 2021, citations were published in MPC's Minor Planet Circulars for many decades. Recent citations can also be found on the JPL Small-Body Database (SBDB). Until his death in 2016, German astronomer Lutz D. Schmadel compiled these citations into the Dictionary of Minor Planet Names (DMP) and regularly updated the collection.

Based on Paul Herget's The Names of the Minor Planets, Schmadel also researched the unclear origin of numerous asteroids, most of which had been named prior to World War II. This article incorporates text from this source, which is in the public domain: SBDB New namings may only be added to this list below after official publication as the preannouncement of names is condemned. The WGSBN publishes a comprehensive guideline for the naming rules of non-cometary small Solar System bodies.

== 47001–47100 ==
| Named minor planet | Provisional | This minor planet was named for... | Ref · Catalog |
|---|---|---|---|
| 47002 Harlingten | 1998 UQ_{2} | Caisey Harlingten (born 1947), Chilean amateur astronomer | JPL · 47002 |
| 47005 Chengmaolan | 1998 UP_{8} | Maolan Cheng (1905–1978), Chinese first director of the Beijing Astronomical Observatory, Chinese Academy of Sciences | JPL · 47005 |
| 47018 Chopinet | 1998 VT_{4} | Marguerite Chopinet (1920–2022), a French astronomer. | IAU · 47018 |
| 47038 Majoni | 1998 WQ_{2} | Vittore Majoni (1936–2002), Italian electrical engineer, secondary education teacher, and amateur astronomer, charter member of the Italian: Associazione Astronomica Cortina (Astronomy Association of Cortina d'Ampezzo), and director of the Helmut Ullrich Astronomical Observatory (Col Drusciè Observatory) | JPL · 47038 |
| 47040 Nathbrouillet | 1998 WB_{3} | Nathalie Brouillet (b. 1963), a French radio astronomer. | IAU · 47040 |
| 47044 Mcpainter | 1998 WS_{7} | John D. McClusky (1914–1994), American painter and founder of the Fredericksburg Art Guild from Fredericksburg, Texas, near the discovery site | JPL · 47044 |
| 47045 Seandaniel | 1998 WK_{9} | Sean Daniel Cooney (born 2002) is the son of the discoverer Walter R. Cooney Jr. and enjoys star parties with his family | JPL · 47045 |
| 47052 Guillaumefaury | 1998 XE_{1} | Guillaume Faury (b. 1976), a research engineer at the Institut de Recherche en Astrophysique et Planétologie (Toulouse). | IAU · 47052 |
| 47054 Jacquesblamont | 1998 XX_{1} | Jacques Blamont (1926–2020), a French astrophysicist. | IAU · 47054 |
| 47069 Tecumseh | 1998 XC_{73} | Tecumseh (1768?–1813) was a Shawnee chief, warrior and diplomat who traveled widely through aboriginal lands in eastern North America to promote an intertribal confederacy for resistance to colonial expansion. | IAU · 47069 |
| 47077 Yuji | 1998 YC_{1} | Yuji Nakamura (born 1956), Japanese amateur astronomer and chemical engineer, discoverer of comet C/1990 E1 and re-discoverer of comet 122P/de Vico | JPL · 47077 |
| 47078 Llebaria | 1998 YS_{2} | Antoine Llebaria (b. 1940), a research engineer at the Laboratoire Astrophysique de Marseille. | IAU · 47078 |
| 47086 Shinseiko | 1999 AO_{3} | Shinseiko, Kanagawa prefecture, youngest natural lake of Japan, formed as a result of the Great Kantō earthquake of 1923 | JPL · 47086 |
| 47096 Canarias | 1999 AX_{25} | The Canary Islands are a Spanish archipelago | IAU · 47096 |

== 47101–47200 ==
back to top

| Named minor planet | Provisional | This minor planet was named for... | Ref · Catalog |
|---|---|---|---|
| 47144 Faulkes | 1999 PY | Dill Faulkes (born 1944), British cosmologist and software tycoon, founder of the Dill Faulkes Educational Trust and the Faulkes Telescope Project | MPC · 47144 |
| 47162 Chicomendez | 1999 TH_{6} | Chico Mendes (1944–1988), Brazilian seringueiro who fought against environmental pollution of the Amazon forest, recipient of the 1987 Global 500 prize from the United Nations Environment Programme | JPL · 47162 |
| 47164 Ticino | 1999 TX_{13} | Ticino, a canton of Switzerland, where the Gnosca Observatory (the discovery site) is located | JPL · 47164 |
| 47171 Lempo | 1999 TC_{36} | Lempo is the ancient Finnish devil who, with the help of his two demon cohorts, Hiisi and Paha, brought down the hero Väinämöinen. Within the trans-Neptunian triple system, the satellite (47171) Lempo I was discovered on 2001 Dec. 8 by C. A. Trujillo and M. E. Brown using the Hubble Space Telescope (HST), and is named Paha. The primary was identified as a binary by S. D. Benecchi et al. through re-analysis of the HST data originally obtained by Trujillo and Brown. Lempo refers to the larger component of the central binary and Hiisi to the smaller component. | JPL · 47171 |

== 47201–47300 ==
back to top

| Named minor planet | Provisional | This minor planet was named for... | Ref · Catalog |
|---|---|---|---|
| 47219 Heatherkoehler | 1999 UU_{41} | Heather Koehler (born 1975) is an aerospace engineer at NASA's Marshall Space Flight Center. She took the lead in developing NASA's first generation of directional meteoroid models, used in the placement of shielding on many crewed and robotic spacecraft. | IAU · 47219 |
| 47293 Masamitsu | 1999 WO | Masamitsu Nakamura (born 1965), Japanese amateur astronomer and medical technologist, co-discoverer of comet C/1994 N1 (Nakamura-Nishimura-Machholz) | JPL · 47293 |
| 47294 Blanský les | 1999 WM_{1} | Blanský les (Blanský Forest), a Czech Protected Landscape Area in south Bohemia, dominated by Kleť Mountain | MPC · 47294 |

== 47301–47400 ==
back to top

| Named minor planet | Provisional | This minor planet was named for... | Ref · Catalog |
|---|---|---|---|
There are no named minor planets in this number range

== 47401–47500 ==
back to top

| Named minor planet | Provisional | This minor planet was named for... | Ref · Catalog |
|---|---|---|---|
| 47466 Mayatoyoshima | 1999 YJ_{9} | Maya Toyoshima (born 1991) is a Japanese vocalist and original member of the musical group "Kalafina". | JPL · 47466 |
| 47473 Lorenzopinna | 2000 AU_{2} | Lorenzo Pinna (b. 1950), an Italian journalist and science popularizer. | IAU · 47473 |
| 47494 Gerhardangl | 2000 AH_{42} | Gerhard Dangl (born 1959), an Austrian amateur astronomer and teacher | JPL · 47494 |

== 47501–47600 ==
back to top

| Named minor planet | Provisional | This minor planet was named for... | Ref · Catalog |
|---|---|---|---|
There are no named minor planets in this number range

== 47601–47700 ==
back to top

| Named minor planet | Provisional | This minor planet was named for... | Ref · Catalog |
|---|---|---|---|
| 47619 Johnpursch | 2000 BW_{28} | John Pursch (born 1958) is a long-time computing systems manager of the University of Arizona's Lunar and Planetary Laboratory and Department of Planetary Sciences. He has provided critical support for numerous planetary scientists, students and spacecraft missions. He is also known for his award-winning poetry. | JPL · 47619 |
| 47620 Joeplassmann | 2000 BA_{29} | Joe Plassmann (born 1965) is the systems manager for the University of Arizona's Lunar and Planetary Laboratory, Planetary Image Research Laboratory, and manages the ground data processing system for NASA's High Resolution Imaging Science Experiment on the Mars Reconnaissance Orbiter. | JPL · 47620 |
| 47627 Kendomanik | 2000 CX | Ken Domanik (born 1957) is a geologist, experimental petrologist and long-time manager of the Michael J. Drake Electron Microprobe Laboratory at the University of Arizona's Lunar and Planetary Laboratory. Renowned for his analytical expertise, he provides invaluable support for numerous scientists and students worldwide. | JPL · 47627 |
| 47649 Susanbrew | 2000 CP_{40} | Susan Brew (born 1951) served as the Program Manager for the University of Arizona and Arizona NASA Space Grant Consortium since the program's inception in 1988. Susan directly supported over 1 \, 300 STEM leaders, mentors and affiliates and her work has positively impacted the lives of countless others. | JPL · 47649 |
| 47650 Tuthill | 2000 CU_{40} | Roger W. Tuthill (1919–2000) was a long-time member of Amateur Astronomer's, Inc., Stellafane, the United Astronomy Clubs of New Jersey (USA), and many other astronomy organizations. | IAU · 47650 |

== 47701–47800 ==
back to top

| Named minor planet | Provisional | This minor planet was named for... | Ref · Catalog |
|---|---|---|---|
| 47707 Jamieson | 2000 DB_{15} | Harry D. Jamieson (born 1945) was one of the leading lights of the Association of Lunar and Planetary Observers in the 1960–2000 period, alternately serving as a Lunar Recorder, board member, Membership Secretary and then Director (1998–2000). During this time he organized their Lunar Dome program. | IAU · 47707 |
| 47708 Jimhamilton | 2000 DR_{15} | Jim Hamilton (1947–2021), an American amateur astronomer who lived in Caballo, New Mexico. | IAU · 47708 |
| 47775 Johnanderson | 2000 DX_{115} | John William Anderson (born 1953), American engineer at the Lunar and Planetary Laboratory of the University of Arizona. He analyzed and digitized images of the Surveyor program and worked at the university's TV station. | IAU · 47775 |
| 47785 Jonathanward | 2000 EL_{20} | Jonathan Ward, American writer who is a NASA Solar System Ambassador and a Fellow of the Royal Astronomical Society. He authored four books on the US space program, including Bringing Columbia Home and the memoirs of astronaut Eileen Collins. | IAU · 47785 |
| 47786 Michaelleinbach | 2000 EQ_{20} | Michael Leinbach, American aerospace engineer. | IAU · 47786 |

== 47801–47900 ==
back to top

| Named minor planet | Provisional | This minor planet was named for... | Ref · Catalog |
|---|---|---|---|
| 47835 Stevecoe | 2000 EK_{116} | Steve Coe (born 1949), an American amateur astronomer with the Saguaro Astronomical Society, in Phoenix, Arizona, and author of several book on observational astronomy | JPL · 47835 |
| 47843 Maxson | 2000 EC_{123} | Paul Maxson (born 1951), an American astrophotographer and coordinator at the Association of Lunar and Planetary Observers (ALPO), an international scientific and educational organization. In 2014 he received the Walter Haas Observer's Award from the ALPO for his high quality images. | JPL · 47843 |
| 47851 Budine | 2000 EW_{139} | Phillip Budine (born 1937) has been an avid lunar and planetary observer for decades. He has served in the Association of Lunar and Planetary Observers (ALPO), including being Recorder for the Jupiter Section. In 1992 he received the ALPO's Walter Haas Observer's Award for his years of excellent observational work. | JPL · 47851 |
| 47852 Frankydubois | 2000 EQ_{140} | Franky Dubois, Belgian amateur astronomer | IAU · 47852 |
| 47862 Nancyramos | 2000 ED_{175} | Nancy L. Ramos (b. 1994), an American administrator and the Executive Assistant to the PI Office for NASA's OSIRIS-REx asteroid sample return mission | IAU · 47862 |
| 47891 García-Migani | 2000 FO_{65} | Esteban García-Migani (born 1983) is a member of the Planetary Science Group of the Universidad Nacional de San Juan (Argentina). He specializes in the study of physical and dynamical properties of comets and active asteroids. | IAU · 47891 |

== 47901–48000 ==
back to top

| Named minor planet | Provisional | This minor planet was named for... | Ref · Catalog |
|---|---|---|---|
| 47931 Stifler | 2000 GG_{167} | Lawrence Stifler (b. 1940), an American philanthropist and founder of the Maine Mineral & Gem Museum. | IAU · 47931 |

back to top

| Preceded by 46,001–47,000 | Meanings of minor-planet names List of minor planets: 47,001–48,000 | Succeeded by 48,001–49,000 |
