= List of minor planets: 47001–48000 =

The following is a partial list of minor planets, running from minor-planet number 47001 through 48000, inclusive. The primary data for this and other partial lists is based on JPL's "Small-Body Orbital Elements" and data available from the Minor Planet Center. Critical list information is also provided by the MPC, unless otherwise specified from Lowell Observatory. A detailed description of the table's columns and additional sources are given on the main page including a complete list of every page in this series, and a statistical break-up on the dynamical classification of minor planets.

Also see the summary list of all named bodies in numerical and alphabetical order, and the corresponding naming citations for the number range of this particular list. New namings may only be added to this list after official publication, as the preannouncement of names is condemned by the Working Group for Small Bodies Nomenclature of the International Astronomical Union.

Near-Earth obj.	MBA (inner)	MBA (outer)	Centaur
Mars-crosser	MBA (middle)	Jupiter trojan	Trans-Neptunian obj.
Unclassified

== 47001–47100 ==
Designation			Discovery			Properties		Ref
Permanent	Provisional	Named after	Date	Site	Discoverer(s)	Category	Diam.	Ref
47001	1998 TA_{35}	—	October 14, 1998	Anderson Mesa	LONEOS	·	5.6 km	MPC · JPL
47002 Harlingten	1998 UQ_{2}	Harlingten	October 20, 1998	Caussols	ODAS	NYS	3.4 km	MPC · JPL
47003	1998 UF_{7}	—	October 23, 1998	Višnjan Observatory	K. Korlević	MAR	3.7 km	MPC · JPL
47004	1998 UZ_{7}	—	October 23, 1998	Višnjan Observatory	K. Korlević	·	3.1 km	MPC · JPL
47005 Chengmaolan	1998 UP_{8}	Chengmaolan	October 16, 1998	Xinglong	SCAP	·	4.0 km	MPC · JPL
47006	1998 UL_{10}	—	October 16, 1998	Kitt Peak	Spacewatch	·	3.6 km	MPC · JPL
47007	1998 UL_{16}	—	October 23, 1998	Višnjan Observatory	K. Korlević	(5)	2.4 km	MPC · JPL
47008	1998 UW_{16}	—	October 27, 1998	Catalina	CSS	·	6.6 km	MPC · JPL
47009	1998 UY_{16}	—	October 27, 1998	Catalina	CSS	·	6.4 km	MPC · JPL
47010	1998 UD_{20}	—	October 28, 1998	Višnjan Observatory	K. Korlević	·	7.2 km	MPC · JPL
47011	1998 UQ_{23}	—	October 17, 1998	Anderson Mesa	LONEOS	·	3.6 km	MPC · JPL
47012	1998 UZ_{26}	—	October 18, 1998	La Silla	E. W. Elst	·	4.2 km	MPC · JPL
47013	1998 UZ_{27}	—	October 18, 1998	La Silla	E. W. Elst	·	8.5 km	MPC · JPL
47014	1998 UJ_{40}	—	October 28, 1998	Socorro	LINEAR	·	4.5 km	MPC · JPL
47015	1998 VW	—	November 10, 1998	Socorro	LINEAR	·	5.4 km	MPC · JPL
47016	1998 VU_{3}	—	November 10, 1998	Caussols	ODAS	·	5.7 km	MPC · JPL
47017	1998 VE_{4}	—	November 11, 1998	Caussols	ODAS	·	4.2 km	MPC · JPL
47018 Chopinet	1998 VT_{4}	Chopinet	November 11, 1998	Caussols	ODAS	·	3.8 km	MPC · JPL
47019	1998 VM_{5}	—	November 8, 1998	Nachi-Katsuura	Y. Shimizu, T. Urata	RAF	3.1 km	MPC · JPL
47020	1998 VP_{9}	—	November 10, 1998	Socorro	LINEAR	·	7.2 km	MPC · JPL
47021	1998 VR_{12}	—	November 10, 1998	Socorro	LINEAR	·	4.4 km	MPC · JPL
47022	1998 VK_{14}	—	November 10, 1998	Socorro	LINEAR	·	4.6 km	MPC · JPL
47023	1998 VZ_{16}	—	November 10, 1998	Socorro	LINEAR	·	4.0 km	MPC · JPL
47024	1998 VV_{19}	—	November 10, 1998	Socorro	LINEAR	·	4.1 km	MPC · JPL
47025	1998 VT_{20}	—	November 10, 1998	Socorro	LINEAR	·	4.1 km	MPC · JPL
47026	1998 VS_{21}	—	November 10, 1998	Socorro	LINEAR	·	6.0 km	MPC · JPL
47027	1998 VX_{29}	—	November 10, 1998	Socorro	LINEAR	·	3.5 km	MPC · JPL
47028	1998 VG_{31}	—	November 12, 1998	Gekko	T. Kagawa	·	3.8 km	MPC · JPL
47029	1998 VO_{31}	—	November 12, 1998	Višnjan Observatory	K. Korlević	·	12 km	MPC · JPL
47030	1998 VG_{32}	—	November 12, 1998	Zeno	T. Stafford	·	3.7 km	MPC · JPL
47031	1998 VX_{38}	—	November 10, 1998	Socorro	LINEAR	·	3.9 km	MPC · JPL
47032	1998 VW_{52}	—	November 13, 1998	Socorro	LINEAR	·	4.6 km	MPC · JPL
47033	1998 VW_{53}	—	November 14, 1998	Socorro	LINEAR	·	4.7 km	MPC · JPL
47034	1998 VP_{54}	—	November 14, 1998	Socorro	LINEAR	·	4.5 km	MPC · JPL
47035	1998 WS	—	November 17, 1998	Socorro	LINEAR	·	10 km	MPC · JPL
47036	1998 WP_{1}	—	November 18, 1998	Oizumi	T. Kobayashi	EOS	5.8 km	MPC · JPL
47037	1998 WM_{2}	—	November 17, 1998	Catalina	CSS	PHO	3.5 km	MPC · JPL
47038 Majoni	1998 WQ_{2}	Majoni	November 17, 1998	Pianoro	V. Goretti	·	5.6 km	MPC · JPL
47039	1998 WA_{3}	—	November 19, 1998	Caussols	ODAS	·	8.6 km	MPC · JPL
47040 Nathbrouillet	1998 WB_{3}	Nathbrouillet	November 19, 1998	Caussols	ODAS	THM	9.8 km	MPC · JPL
47041	1998 WO_{3}	—	November 19, 1998	Oizumi	T. Kobayashi	·	7.4 km	MPC · JPL
47042	1998 WP_{3}	—	November 19, 1998	Oizumi	T. Kobayashi	KOR	3.9 km	MPC · JPL
47043	1998 WX_{3}	—	November 18, 1998	Socorro	LINEAR	·	4.0 km	MPC · JPL
47044 Mcpainter	1998 WS_{7}	Mcpainter	November 16, 1998	Fair Oaks Ranch	J. V. McClusky	·	3.5 km	MPC · JPL
47045 Seandaniel	1998 WK_{9}	Seandaniel	November 29, 1998	Baton Rouge	W. R. Cooney Jr.	AGN	4.0 km	MPC · JPL
47046	1998 WM_{9}	—	November 26, 1998	Višnjan Observatory	K. Korlević	·	6.7 km	MPC · JPL
47047	1998 WX_{12}	—	November 21, 1998	Socorro	LINEAR	·	6.8 km	MPC · JPL
47048	1998 WW_{18}	—	November 21, 1998	Socorro	LINEAR	·	5.1 km	MPC · JPL
47049	1998 WT_{19}	—	November 25, 1998	Socorro	LINEAR	EUN	6.7 km	MPC · JPL
47050	1998 WN_{20}	—	November 18, 1998	Socorro	LINEAR	·	13 km	MPC · JPL
47051	1998 XZ	—	December 7, 1998	Caussols	ODAS	·	3.8 km	MPC · JPL
47052 Guillaumefaury	1998 XE_{1}	Guillaumefaury	December 7, 1998	Caussols	ODAS	·	3.9 km	MPC · JPL
47053	1998 XH_{1}	—	December 7, 1998	Caussols	ODAS	·	4.2 km	MPC · JPL
47054 Jacquesblamont	1998 XX_{1}	Jacquesblamont	December 7, 1998	Caussols	ODAS	GEF	3.5 km	MPC · JPL
47055	1998 XH_{5}	—	December 10, 1998	High Point	D. K. Chesney	·	8.5 km	MPC · JPL
47056	1998 XP_{7}	—	December 8, 1998	Kitt Peak	Spacewatch	·	9.8 km	MPC · JPL
47057	1998 XM_{12}	—	December 9, 1998	Xinglong	SCAP	·	5.0 km	MPC · JPL
47058	1998 XC_{15}	—	December 15, 1998	Caussols	ODAS	GEF	3.6 km	MPC · JPL
47059	1998 XX_{20}	—	December 10, 1998	Kitt Peak	Spacewatch	·	6.5 km	MPC · JPL
47060	1998 XX_{33}	—	December 14, 1998	Socorro	LINEAR	·	4.6 km	MPC · JPL
47061	1998 XZ_{43}	—	December 14, 1998	Socorro	LINEAR	·	7.8 km	MPC · JPL
47062	1998 XH_{52}	—	December 14, 1998	Socorro	LINEAR	·	8.4 km	MPC · JPL
47063	1998 XX_{52}	—	December 14, 1998	Socorro	LINEAR	KOR	5.1 km	MPC · JPL
47064	1998 XT_{53}	—	December 14, 1998	Socorro	LINEAR	·	5.5 km	MPC · JPL
47065	1998 XC_{55}	—	December 15, 1998	Socorro	LINEAR	·	4.1 km	MPC · JPL
47066	1998 XN_{57}	—	December 15, 1998	Socorro	LINEAR	MIS	7.5 km	MPC · JPL
47067	1998 XB_{62}	—	December 15, 1998	Kitt Peak	Spacewatch	·	1.7 km	MPC · JPL
47068	1998 XJ_{62}	—	December 9, 1998	Socorro	LINEAR	·	4.7 km	MPC · JPL
47069 Tecumseh	1998 XC_{73}	Tecumseh	December 14, 1998	Socorro	LINEAR	slow	6.2 km	MPC · JPL
47070	1998 XF_{77}	—	December 15, 1998	Granville	Davis, R. G.	·	5.4 km	MPC · JPL
47071	1998 XO_{77}	—	December 15, 1998	Socorro	LINEAR	EUN	4.0 km	MPC · JPL
47072	1998 XM_{79}	—	December 15, 1998	Socorro	LINEAR	·	6.7 km	MPC · JPL
47073	1998 XP_{95}	—	December 15, 1998	Socorro	LINEAR	·	6.8 km	MPC · JPL
47074	1998 XV_{95}	—	December 15, 1998	Socorro	LINEAR	·	10 km	MPC · JPL
47075	1998 YB	—	December 16, 1998	Višnjan Observatory	K. Korlević	THM	9.8 km	MPC · JPL
47076	1998 YV	—	December 16, 1998	Oizumi	T. Kobayashi	THM	9.8 km	MPC · JPL
47077 Yuji	1998 YC_{1}	Yuji	December 16, 1998	Kuma Kogen	A. Nakamura	·	13 km	MPC · JPL
47078 Llebaria	1998 YS_{2}	Llebaria	December 17, 1998	Caussols	ODAS	(1118)	16 km	MPC · JPL
47079	1998 YA_{3}	—	December 16, 1998	Uenohara	N. Kawasato	·	6.1 km	MPC · JPL
47080	1998 YA_{7}	—	December 22, 1998	Višnjan Observatory	K. Korlević	·	5.2 km	MPC · JPL
47081	1998 YV_{9}	—	December 25, 1998	Višnjan Observatory	K. Korlević, M. Jurić	·	6.7 km	MPC · JPL
47082	1998 YA_{15}	—	December 22, 1998	Kitt Peak	Spacewatch	TEL	3.9 km	MPC · JPL
47083	1998 YG_{22}	—	December 29, 1998	Starkenburg Observatory	Starkenburg	·	4.5 km	MPC · JPL
47084	1999 AQ	—	January 4, 1999	Farra d'Isonzo	Farra d'Isonzo	EOS	4.9 km	MPC · JPL
47085	1999 AW_{2}	—	January 7, 1999	Kitt Peak	Spacewatch	THM	6.2 km	MPC · JPL
47086 Shinseiko	1999 AO_{3}	Shinseiko	January 10, 1999	Hadano Obs.	A. Asami	·	9.7 km	MPC · JPL
47087	1999 AY_{3}	—	January 10, 1999	Oizumi	T. Kobayashi	·	3.9 km	MPC · JPL
47088	1999 AB_{7}	—	January 9, 1999	Višnjan Observatory	K. Korlević	EOS	4.6 km	MPC · JPL
47089	1999 AC_{7}	—	January 9, 1999	Višnjan Observatory	K. Korlević	·	3.6 km	MPC · JPL
47090	1999 AJ_{7}	—	January 9, 1999	Višnjan Observatory	K. Korlević	PHO	3.2 km	MPC · JPL
47091	1999 AP_{9}	—	January 10, 1999	Xinglong	SCAP	KOR	5.3 km	MPC · JPL
47092	1999 AB_{10}	—	January 13, 1999	Višnjan Observatory	K. Korlević	·	5.9 km	MPC · JPL
47093	1999 AF_{21}	—	January 10, 1999	Višnjan Observatory	K. Korlević	NYS ·	5.1 km	MPC · JPL
47094	1999 AW_{21}	—	January 15, 1999	Višnjan Observatory	K. Korlević	·	2.1 km	MPC · JPL
47095	1999 AQ_{25}	—	January 15, 1999	Caussols	ODAS	THM · fast?	7.6 km	MPC · JPL
47096 Canarias	1999 AX_{25}	Canarias	January 15, 1999	Mallorca	R. Pacheco, Á. López J.	·	11 km	MPC · JPL
47097	1999 AE_{26}	—	January 15, 1999	Farra d'Isonzo	Farra d'Isonzo	·	9.8 km	MPC · JPL
47098	1999 AM_{28}	—	January 13, 1999	Kitt Peak	Spacewatch	·	3.8 km	MPC · JPL
47099	1999 AO_{37}	—	January 8, 1999	Anderson Mesa	LONEOS	·	6.9 km	MPC · JPL
47100	1999 BB_{10}	—	January 23, 1999	Višnjan Observatory	K. Korlević	·	4.2 km	MPC · JPL

== 47101–47200 ==
back to top

Designation			Discovery			Properties		Ref
Permanent	Provisional	Named after	Date	Site	Discoverer(s)	Category	Diam.	Ref
47101	1999 BP_{12}	—	January 24, 1999	Črni Vrh	Mikuž, H.	·	3.9 km	MPC · JPL
47102	1999 BT_{12}	—	January 20, 1999	Višnjan Observatory	K. Korlević	HYG	9.5 km	MPC · JPL
47103	1999 BQ_{28}	—	January 17, 1999	Kitt Peak	Spacewatch	THM	6.1 km	MPC · JPL
47104	1999 CD_{18}	—	February 10, 1999	Socorro	LINEAR	·	7.6 km	MPC · JPL
47105	1999 CJ_{18}	—	February 10, 1999	Socorro	LINEAR	EOS	8.2 km	MPC · JPL
47106	1999 CU_{20}	—	February 10, 1999	Socorro	LINEAR	MAR	4.2 km	MPC · JPL
47107	1999 CB_{22}	—	February 10, 1999	Socorro	LINEAR	·	6.1 km	MPC · JPL
47108	1999 CM_{37}	—	February 10, 1999	Socorro	LINEAR	THM	8.3 km	MPC · JPL
47109	1999 CQ_{37}	—	February 10, 1999	Socorro	LINEAR	·	7.3 km	MPC · JPL
47110	1999 CK_{44}	—	February 10, 1999	Socorro	LINEAR	DOR	6.6 km	MPC · JPL
47111	1999 CP_{48}	—	February 10, 1999	Socorro	LINEAR	·	8.7 km	MPC · JPL
47112	1999 CZ_{54}	—	February 10, 1999	Socorro	LINEAR	CYB	12 km	MPC · JPL
47113	1999 CD_{57}	—	February 10, 1999	Socorro	LINEAR	·	10 km	MPC · JPL
47114	1999 CP_{61}	—	February 12, 1999	Socorro	LINEAR	CYB	20 km	MPC · JPL
47115	1999 CH_{62}	—	February 12, 1999	Socorro	LINEAR	·	15 km	MPC · JPL
47116	1999 CL_{64}	—	February 12, 1999	Socorro	LINEAR	·	9.9 km	MPC · JPL
47117	1999 CE_{72}	—	February 12, 1999	Socorro	LINEAR	·	6.7 km	MPC · JPL
47118	1999 CP_{72}	—	February 12, 1999	Socorro	LINEAR	EUN	4.4 km	MPC · JPL
47119	1999 CM_{81}	—	February 12, 1999	Socorro	LINEAR	·	9.5 km	MPC · JPL
47120	1999 CP_{84}	—	February 10, 1999	Socorro	LINEAR	MAR	4.8 km	MPC · JPL
47121	1999 CG_{85}	—	February 10, 1999	Socorro	LINEAR	V	2.4 km	MPC · JPL
47122	1999 CZ_{88}	—	February 10, 1999	Socorro	LINEAR	·	4.3 km	MPC · JPL
47123	1999 CS_{91}	—	February 10, 1999	Socorro	LINEAR	HYG	7.7 km	MPC · JPL
47124	1999 CS_{99}	—	February 10, 1999	Socorro	LINEAR	·	7.3 km	MPC · JPL
47125	1999 CM_{100}	—	February 10, 1999	Socorro	LINEAR	(3460)	8.0 km	MPC · JPL
47126	1999 CH_{101}	—	February 10, 1999	Socorro	LINEAR	EOS	5.8 km	MPC · JPL
47127	1999 CJ_{103}	—	February 12, 1999	Socorro	LINEAR	·	6.3 km	MPC · JPL
47128	1999 CZ_{115}	—	February 12, 1999	Socorro	LINEAR	·	12 km	MPC · JPL
47129	1999 CR_{118}	—	February 9, 1999	Xinglong	SCAP	EOS	5.7 km	MPC · JPL
47130	1999 CT_{127}	—	February 11, 1999	Socorro	LINEAR	·	4.7 km	MPC · JPL
47131	1999 CA_{133}	—	February 7, 1999	Kitt Peak	Spacewatch	THM	5.8 km	MPC · JPL
47132	1999 CD_{154}	—	February 14, 1999	Anderson Mesa	LONEOS	·	10 km	MPC · JPL
47133	1999 DH_{5}	—	February 17, 1999	Socorro	LINEAR	EUN	4.9 km	MPC · JPL
47134	1999 DB_{6}	—	February 17, 1999	Socorro	LINEAR	EUN	4.8 km	MPC · JPL
47135	1999 EX_{2}	—	March 8, 1999	High Point	D. K. Chesney	H	1.6 km	MPC · JPL
47136	1999 EA_{3}	—	March 12, 1999	High Point	D. K. Chesney	(1118)	8.9 km	MPC · JPL
47137	1999 FJ_{22}	—	March 19, 1999	Socorro	LINEAR	·	8.0 km	MPC · JPL
47138	1999 FS_{35}	—	March 20, 1999	Socorro	LINEAR	·	13 km	MPC · JPL
47139	1999 GN_{9}	—	April 11, 1999	Anderson Mesa	LONEOS	·	16 km	MPC · JPL
47140	1999 GL_{37}	—	April 12, 1999	Socorro	LINEAR	EOS	7.3 km	MPC · JPL
47141	1999 HB_{3}	—	April 24, 1999	Reedy Creek	J. Broughton	H	2.6 km	MPC · JPL
47142	1999 LQ_{2}	—	June 8, 1999	Socorro	LINEAR	H	1.4 km	MPC · JPL
47143	1999 LL_{31}	—	June 12, 1999	Socorro	LINEAR	H	2.5 km	MPC · JPL
47144 Faulkes	1999 PY	Faulkes	August 7, 1999	Kleť	J. Tichá, M. Tichý	·	3.5 km	MPC · JPL
47145	1999 RN_{11}	—	September 7, 1999	Socorro	LINEAR	H	1.6 km	MPC · JPL
47146	1999 RZ_{18}	—	September 7, 1999	Socorro	LINEAR	·	5.0 km	MPC · JPL
47147	1999 RC_{24}	—	September 7, 1999	Socorro	LINEAR	·	1.5 km	MPC · JPL
47148	1999 RN_{25}	—	September 7, 1999	Socorro	LINEAR	·	4.1 km	MPC · JPL
47149	1999 RX_{34}	—	September 11, 1999	Višnjan Observatory	K. Korlević	·	2.7 km	MPC · JPL
47150	1999 RN_{35}	—	September 11, 1999	Višnjan Observatory	K. Korlević	·	2.2 km	MPC · JPL
47151	1999 RV_{88}	—	September 7, 1999	Socorro	LINEAR	·	4.4 km	MPC · JPL
47152	1999 RB_{92}	—	September 7, 1999	Socorro	LINEAR	·	1.7 km	MPC · JPL
47153	1999 RD_{132}	—	September 9, 1999	Socorro	LINEAR	·	5.2 km	MPC · JPL
47154	1999 RE_{141}	—	September 9, 1999	Socorro	LINEAR	·	3.7 km	MPC · JPL
47155	1999 RB_{159}	—	September 9, 1999	Socorro	LINEAR	·	2.8 km	MPC · JPL
47156	1999 RE_{160}	—	September 9, 1999	Socorro	LINEAR	·	1.7 km	MPC · JPL
47157	1999 RG_{188}	—	September 9, 1999	Socorro	LINEAR	EOS	4.4 km	MPC · JPL
47158	1999 RR_{247}	—	September 5, 1999	Anderson Mesa	LONEOS	·	2.4 km	MPC · JPL
47159	1999 SJ	—	September 16, 1999	Višnjan Observatory	K. Korlević	NYS	2.8 km	MPC · JPL
47160	1999 SU_{17}	—	September 30, 1999	Socorro	LINEAR	·	4.8 km	MPC · JPL
47161	1999 TH_{1}	—	October 1, 1999	Višnjan Observatory	K. Korlević	·	2.1 km	MPC · JPL
47162 Chicomendez	1999 TH_{6}	Chicomendez	October 2, 1999	Monte Agliale	Santangelo, M. M. M.	·	2.5 km	MPC · JPL
47163	1999 TP_{11}	—	October 8, 1999	Kleť	Kleť	·	3.1 km	MPC · JPL
47164 Ticino	1999 TX_{13}	Ticino	October 10, 1999	Gnosca	S. Sposetti	·	4.8 km	MPC · JPL
47165	1999 TM_{14}	—	October 11, 1999	Višnjan Observatory	K. Korlević, M. Jurić	·	1.5 km	MPC · JPL
47166	1999 TT_{18}	—	October 15, 1999	Prescott	P. G. Comba	·	1.8 km	MPC · JPL
47167	1999 TP_{27}	—	October 3, 1999	Socorro	LINEAR	·	3.9 km	MPC · JPL
47168	1999 TE_{30}	—	October 4, 1999	Socorro	LINEAR	·	2.2 km	MPC · JPL
47169	1999 TH_{32}	—	October 4, 1999	Socorro	LINEAR	(1338) (FLO)	1.9 km	MPC · JPL
47170	1999 TE_{33}	—	October 4, 1999	Socorro	LINEAR	·	1.8 km	MPC · JPL
47171 Lempo	1999 TC_{36}	Lempo	October 1, 1999	Kitt Peak	Rubenstein, E. P., Strolger, L.-G.	plutino · moon	272 km	MPC · JPL
47172	1999 TM_{48}	—	October 4, 1999	Kitt Peak	Spacewatch	·	1.3 km	MPC · JPL
47173	1999 TJ_{49}	—	October 4, 1999	Kitt Peak	Spacewatch	·	1.7 km	MPC · JPL
47174	1999 TC_{95}	—	October 2, 1999	Socorro	LINEAR	·	2.5 km	MPC · JPL
47175	1999 TP_{98}	—	October 2, 1999	Socorro	LINEAR	·	3.4 km	MPC · JPL
47176	1999 TK_{105}	—	October 3, 1999	Socorro	LINEAR	·	2.3 km	MPC · JPL
47177	1999 TU_{112}	—	October 4, 1999	Socorro	LINEAR	·	1.7 km	MPC · JPL
47178	1999 TK_{113}	—	October 4, 1999	Socorro	LINEAR	·	10 km	MPC · JPL
47179	1999 TM_{117}	—	October 4, 1999	Socorro	LINEAR	·	2.3 km	MPC · JPL
47180	1999 TV_{119}	—	October 4, 1999	Socorro	LINEAR	·	1.7 km	MPC · JPL
47181	1999 TB_{123}	—	October 4, 1999	Socorro	LINEAR	·	1.3 km	MPC · JPL
47182	1999 TL_{124}	—	October 4, 1999	Socorro	LINEAR	·	2.2 km	MPC · JPL
47183	1999 TC_{127}	—	October 4, 1999	Socorro	LINEAR	·	2.0 km	MPC · JPL
47184	1999 TX_{127}	—	October 4, 1999	Socorro	LINEAR	·	2.4 km	MPC · JPL
47185	1999 TC_{146}	—	October 7, 1999	Socorro	LINEAR	·	3.0 km	MPC · JPL
47186	1999 TC_{147}	—	October 7, 1999	Socorro	LINEAR	·	1.6 km	MPC · JPL
47187	1999 TL_{154}	—	October 7, 1999	Socorro	LINEAR	·	2.2 km	MPC · JPL
47188	1999 TU_{155}	—	October 7, 1999	Socorro	LINEAR	·	2.1 km	MPC · JPL
47189	1999 TT_{166}	—	October 10, 1999	Socorro	LINEAR	·	1.9 km	MPC · JPL
47190	1999 TA_{171}	—	October 10, 1999	Socorro	LINEAR	V	1.7 km	MPC · JPL
47191	1999 TK_{172}	—	October 10, 1999	Socorro	LINEAR	·	3.0 km	MPC · JPL
47192	1999 TT_{176}	—	October 10, 1999	Socorro	LINEAR	·	2.8 km	MPC · JPL
47193	1999 TJ_{178}	—	October 10, 1999	Socorro	LINEAR	·	1.5 km	MPC · JPL
47194	1999 TK_{178}	—	October 10, 1999	Socorro	LINEAR	·	1.9 km	MPC · JPL
47195	1999 TG_{179}	—	October 10, 1999	Socorro	LINEAR	·	1.6 km	MPC · JPL
47196	1999 TZ_{180}	—	October 10, 1999	Socorro	LINEAR	·	1.9 km	MPC · JPL
47197	1999 TZ_{193}	—	October 12, 1999	Socorro	LINEAR	·	1.6 km	MPC · JPL
47198	1999 TL_{199}	—	October 12, 1999	Socorro	LINEAR	·	1.5 km	MPC · JPL
47199	1999 TY_{204}	—	October 13, 1999	Socorro	LINEAR	·	2.4 km	MPC · JPL
47200	1999 TB_{205}	—	October 13, 1999	Socorro	LINEAR	·	2.1 km	MPC · JPL

== 47201–47300 ==
back to top

Designation			Discovery			Properties		Ref
Permanent	Provisional	Named after	Date	Site	Discoverer(s)	Category	Diam.	Ref
47201	1999 TJ_{205}	—	October 13, 1999	Socorro	LINEAR	·	3.3 km	MPC · JPL
47202	1999 TD_{212}	—	October 15, 1999	Socorro	LINEAR	·	1.6 km	MPC · JPL
47203	1999 TM_{219}	—	October 1, 1999	Catalina	CSS	·	1.6 km	MPC · JPL
47204	1999 TO_{221}	—	October 2, 1999	Socorro	LINEAR	·	3.0 km	MPC · JPL
47205	1999 TQ_{234}	—	October 3, 1999	Catalina	CSS	·	2.2 km	MPC · JPL
47206	1999 TU_{243}	—	October 6, 1999	Socorro	LINEAR	·	1.6 km	MPC · JPL
47207	1999 TB_{248}	—	October 8, 1999	Catalina	CSS	·	1.8 km	MPC · JPL
47208	1999 TL_{253}	—	October 13, 1999	Socorro	LINEAR	·	2.3 km	MPC · JPL
47209	1999 TM_{257}	—	October 9, 1999	Socorro	LINEAR	·	1.5 km	MPC · JPL
47210	1999 TB_{273}	—	October 3, 1999	Socorro	LINEAR	·	2.1 km	MPC · JPL
47211	1999 TX_{290}	—	October 10, 1999	Socorro	LINEAR	·	2.2 km	MPC · JPL
47212	1999 TN_{291}	—	October 10, 1999	Socorro	LINEAR	·	2.3 km	MPC · JPL
47213	1999 TC_{293}	—	October 12, 1999	Socorro	LINEAR	·	2.4 km	MPC · JPL
47214	1999 TD_{293}	—	October 12, 1999	Socorro	LINEAR	·	2.5 km	MPC · JPL
47215	1999 TZ_{319}	—	October 10, 1999	Socorro	LINEAR	JUN	7.1 km	MPC · JPL
47216	1999 UX_{7}	—	October 29, 1999	Catalina	CSS	V	2.0 km	MPC · JPL
47217	1999 UF_{18}	—	October 30, 1999	Kitt Peak	Spacewatch	·	1.7 km	MPC · JPL
47218	1999 UN_{37}	—	October 16, 1999	Kitt Peak	Spacewatch	·	1.6 km	MPC · JPL
47219 Heatherkoehler	1999 UU_{41}	Heatherkoehler	October 18, 1999	Anderson Mesa	LONEOS	·	7.0 km	MPC · JPL
47220	1999 UJ_{46}	—	October 31, 1999	Catalina	CSS	·	2.3 km	MPC · JPL
47221	1999 VM_{4}	—	November 1, 1999	Catalina	CSS	V	1.7 km	MPC · JPL
47222	1999 VR_{8}	—	November 8, 1999	Gekko	T. Kagawa	·	2.2 km	MPC · JPL
47223	1999 VW_{10}	—	November 9, 1999	Oizumi	T. Kobayashi	·	3.7 km	MPC · JPL
47224	1999 VG_{11}	—	November 8, 1999	Višnjan Observatory	K. Korlević	V	2.9 km	MPC · JPL
47225	1999 VJ_{12}	—	November 9, 1999	Catalina	CSS	·	4.1 km	MPC · JPL
47226	1999 VE_{19}	—	November 8, 1999	Višnjan Observatory	K. Korlević	·	3.8 km	MPC · JPL
47227	1999 VS_{24}	—	November 13, 1999	Oizumi	T. Kobayashi	NYS	2.1 km	MPC · JPL
47228	1999 VP_{26}	—	November 3, 1999	Socorro	LINEAR	·	1.9 km	MPC · JPL
47229	1999 VT_{27}	—	November 3, 1999	Catalina	CSS	V	2.0 km	MPC · JPL
47230	1999 VT_{28}	—	November 3, 1999	Socorro	LINEAR	·	1.7 km	MPC · JPL
47231	1999 VJ_{35}	—	November 3, 1999	Socorro	LINEAR	(2076)	2.2 km	MPC · JPL
47232	1999 VQ_{36}	—	November 3, 1999	Socorro	LINEAR	·	2.2 km	MPC · JPL
47233	1999 VR_{38}	—	November 10, 1999	Socorro	LINEAR	·	1.9 km	MPC · JPL
47234	1999 VP_{43}	—	November 1, 1999	Catalina	CSS	·	2.1 km	MPC · JPL
47235	1999 VX_{43}	—	November 1, 1999	Catalina	CSS	·	2.9 km	MPC · JPL
47236	1999 VU_{48}	—	November 3, 1999	Socorro	LINEAR	V	2.8 km	MPC · JPL
47237	1999 VP_{49}	—	November 3, 1999	Socorro	LINEAR	·	6.1 km	MPC · JPL
47238	1999 VB_{50}	—	November 3, 1999	Socorro	LINEAR	V	2.9 km	MPC · JPL
47239	1999 VN_{50}	—	November 3, 1999	Socorro	LINEAR	·	3.2 km	MPC · JPL
47240	1999 VR_{50}	—	November 3, 1999	Socorro	LINEAR	NYS	3.3 km	MPC · JPL
47241	1999 VS_{50}	—	November 3, 1999	Socorro	LINEAR	NYS ·	5.0 km	MPC · JPL
47242	1999 VY_{50}	—	November 3, 1999	Socorro	LINEAR	·	2.1 km	MPC · JPL
47243	1999 VY_{51}	—	November 3, 1999	Socorro	LINEAR	·	2.4 km	MPC · JPL
47244	1999 VA_{53}	—	November 3, 1999	Socorro	LINEAR	NYS	3.2 km	MPC · JPL
47245	1999 VX_{53}	—	November 4, 1999	Socorro	LINEAR	·	2.4 km	MPC · JPL
47246	1999 VN_{54}	—	November 4, 1999	Socorro	LINEAR	·	2.4 km	MPC · JPL
47247	1999 VQ_{56}	—	November 4, 1999	Socorro	LINEAR	(2076)	1.6 km	MPC · JPL
47248	1999 VK_{57}	—	November 4, 1999	Socorro	LINEAR	·	2.0 km	MPC · JPL
47249	1999 VY_{57}	—	November 4, 1999	Socorro	LINEAR	·	3.9 km	MPC · JPL
47250	1999 VW_{58}	—	November 4, 1999	Socorro	LINEAR	·	3.1 km	MPC · JPL
47251	1999 VS_{60}	—	November 4, 1999	Socorro	LINEAR	·	2.6 km	MPC · JPL
47252	1999 VJ_{65}	—	November 4, 1999	Socorro	LINEAR	·	4.4 km	MPC · JPL
47253	1999 VN_{65}	—	November 4, 1999	Socorro	LINEAR	MAS	1.9 km	MPC · JPL
47254	1999 VO_{67}	—	November 4, 1999	Socorro	LINEAR	V	1.6 km	MPC · JPL
47255	1999 VA_{70}	—	November 4, 1999	Socorro	LINEAR	NYS	4.1 km	MPC · JPL
47256	1999 VA_{72}	—	November 11, 1999	Xinglong	SCAP	·	4.2 km	MPC · JPL
47257	1999 VA_{79}	—	November 4, 1999	Socorro	LINEAR	·	4.0 km	MPC · JPL
47258	1999 VS_{80}	—	November 4, 1999	Socorro	LINEAR	·	2.0 km	MPC · JPL
47259	1999 VJ_{81}	—	November 4, 1999	Socorro	LINEAR	·	6.4 km	MPC · JPL
47260	1999 VR_{88}	—	November 4, 1999	Socorro	LINEAR	·	1.6 km	MPC · JPL
47261	1999 VH_{90}	—	November 5, 1999	Socorro	LINEAR	·	2.0 km	MPC · JPL
47262	1999 VF_{91}	—	November 5, 1999	Socorro	LINEAR	·	1.7 km	MPC · JPL
47263	1999 VJ_{92}	—	November 9, 1999	Socorro	LINEAR	·	1.8 km	MPC · JPL
47264	1999 VV_{93}	—	November 9, 1999	Socorro	LINEAR	·	2.2 km	MPC · JPL
47265	1999 VT_{97}	—	November 9, 1999	Socorro	LINEAR	·	1.7 km	MPC · JPL
47266	1999 VY_{98}	—	November 9, 1999	Socorro	LINEAR	NYS	3.5 km	MPC · JPL
47267	1999 VU_{112}	—	November 9, 1999	Socorro	LINEAR	MAS	1.9 km	MPC · JPL
47268	1999 VJ_{119}	—	November 3, 1999	Kitt Peak	Spacewatch	ERI	3.9 km	MPC · JPL
47269	1999 VH_{135}	—	November 13, 1999	Anderson Mesa	LONEOS	(2076)	4.1 km	MPC · JPL
47270	1999 VE_{138}	—	November 12, 1999	Socorro	LINEAR	·	3.5 km	MPC · JPL
47271	1999 VY_{143}	—	November 11, 1999	Catalina	CSS	·	4.8 km	MPC · JPL
47272	1999 VF_{144}	—	November 11, 1999	Catalina	CSS	·	2.0 km	MPC · JPL
47273	1999 VE_{145}	—	November 13, 1999	Catalina	CSS	·	2.5 km	MPC · JPL
47274	1999 VJ_{147}	—	November 12, 1999	Socorro	LINEAR	·	2.3 km	MPC · JPL
47275	1999 VZ_{147}	—	November 14, 1999	Socorro	LINEAR	·	1.6 km	MPC · JPL
47276	1999 VN_{151}	—	November 14, 1999	Socorro	LINEAR	·	4.6 km	MPC · JPL
47277	1999 VL_{154}	—	November 12, 1999	Kitt Peak	Spacewatch	·	1.4 km	MPC · JPL
47278	1999 VU_{157}	—	November 14, 1999	Socorro	LINEAR	·	2.0 km	MPC · JPL
47279	1999 VS_{160}	—	November 14, 1999	Socorro	LINEAR	·	2.4 km	MPC · JPL
47280	1999 VJ_{161}	—	November 14, 1999	Socorro	LINEAR	NYS	3.4 km	MPC · JPL
47281	1999 VS_{162}	—	November 14, 1999	Socorro	LINEAR	·	3.0 km	MPC · JPL
47282	1999 VG_{167}	—	November 14, 1999	Socorro	LINEAR	·	1.9 km	MPC · JPL
47283	1999 VF_{173}	—	November 15, 1999	Socorro	LINEAR	·	3.3 km	MPC · JPL
47284	1999 VO_{173}	—	November 15, 1999	Socorro	LINEAR	·	4.8 km	MPC · JPL
47285	1999 VU_{173}	—	November 15, 1999	Socorro	LINEAR	·	2.6 km	MPC · JPL
47286	1999 VH_{176}	—	November 4, 1999	Socorro	LINEAR	·	1.8 km	MPC · JPL
47287	1999 VR_{177}	—	November 6, 1999	Socorro	LINEAR	·	2.8 km	MPC · JPL
47288	1999 VQ_{178}	—	November 6, 1999	Socorro	LINEAR	·	2.3 km	MPC · JPL
47289	1999 VD_{188}	—	November 15, 1999	Socorro	LINEAR	·	2.4 km	MPC · JPL
47290	1999 VS_{188}	—	November 15, 1999	Socorro	LINEAR	·	2.3 km	MPC · JPL
47291	1999 VG_{195}	—	November 3, 1999	Catalina	CSS	·	4.0 km	MPC · JPL
47292	1999 VO_{203}	—	November 8, 1999	Anderson Mesa	LONEOS	·	2.5 km	MPC · JPL
47293 Masamitsu	1999 WO	Masamitsu	November 16, 1999	Kuma Kogen	A. Nakamura	NYS	2.8 km	MPC · JPL
47294 Blanský les	1999 WM_{1}	Blanský les	November 28, 1999	Kleť	J. Tichá, M. Tichý	·	3.0 km	MPC · JPL
47295	1999 WV_{1}	—	November 25, 1999	Višnjan Observatory	K. Korlević	NYS	2.7 km	MPC · JPL
47296	1999 WD_{2}	—	November 20, 1999	Farra d'Isonzo	Farra d'Isonzo	·	2.5 km	MPC · JPL
47297	1999 WN_{2}	—	November 26, 1999	Višnjan Observatory	K. Korlević	·	3.9 km	MPC · JPL
47298	1999 WX_{2}	—	November 27, 1999	Višnjan Observatory	K. Korlević	·	1.4 km	MPC · JPL
47299	1999 WJ_{3}	—	November 28, 1999	Oizumi	T. Kobayashi	·	3.9 km	MPC · JPL
47300	1999 WN_{4}	—	November 28, 1999	Oizumi	T. Kobayashi	·	5.5 km	MPC · JPL

== 47301–47400 ==
back to top

Designation			Discovery			Properties		Ref
Permanent	Provisional	Named after	Date	Site	Discoverer(s)	Category	Diam.	Ref
47301	1999 WA_{6}	—	November 28, 1999	Višnjan Observatory	K. Korlević	·	2.4 km	MPC · JPL
47302	1999 WG_{6}	—	November 28, 1999	Višnjan Observatory	K. Korlević	V	2.2 km	MPC · JPL
47303	1999 WU_{7}	—	November 29, 1999	Višnjan Observatory	K. Korlević	EUN	5.4 km	MPC · JPL
47304	1999 WH_{8}	—	November 28, 1999	Oizumi	T. Kobayashi	·	3.2 km	MPC · JPL
47305	1999 WL_{24}	—	November 28, 1999	Kitt Peak	Spacewatch	NYS	3.0 km	MPC · JPL
47306	1999 XB_{4}	—	December 4, 1999	Catalina	CSS	·	4.3 km	MPC · JPL
47307	1999 XR_{4}	—	December 4, 1999	Catalina	CSS	·	2.8 km	MPC · JPL
47308	1999 XP_{5}	—	December 4, 1999	Catalina	CSS	·	3.3 km	MPC · JPL
47309	1999 XV_{6}	—	December 4, 1999	Catalina	CSS	·	3.0 km	MPC · JPL
47310	1999 XG_{7}	—	December 4, 1999	Catalina	CSS	·	2.9 km	MPC · JPL
47311	1999 XN_{7}	—	December 4, 1999	Fountain Hills	C. W. Juels	NYS	4.3 km	MPC · JPL
47312	1999 XG_{8}	—	December 3, 1999	Oizumi	T. Kobayashi	(2076)	2.7 km	MPC · JPL
47313	1999 XH_{11}	—	December 5, 1999	Catalina	CSS	(2076)	2.4 km	MPC · JPL
47314	1999 XK_{11}	—	December 5, 1999	Catalina	CSS	·	3.2 km	MPC · JPL
47315	1999 XW_{11}	—	December 6, 1999	Catalina	CSS	·	2.3 km	MPC · JPL
47316	1999 XM_{12}	—	December 5, 1999	Socorro	LINEAR	·	5.0 km	MPC · JPL
47317	1999 XL_{13}	—	December 5, 1999	Socorro	LINEAR	·	2.0 km	MPC · JPL
47318	1999 XO_{13}	—	December 5, 1999	Socorro	LINEAR	·	4.5 km	MPC · JPL
47319	1999 XF_{14}	—	December 5, 1999	Socorro	LINEAR	·	4.6 km	MPC · JPL
47320	1999 XA_{15}	—	December 6, 1999	Socorro	LINEAR	PHO	4.6 km	MPC · JPL
47321	1999 XS_{19}	—	December 5, 1999	Socorro	LINEAR	·	1.9 km	MPC · JPL
47322	1999 XS_{21}	—	December 5, 1999	Socorro	LINEAR	·	3.1 km	MPC · JPL
47323	1999 XD_{22}	—	December 5, 1999	Socorro	LINEAR	·	2.8 km	MPC · JPL
47324	1999 XN_{22}	—	December 6, 1999	Socorro	LINEAR	·	2.2 km	MPC · JPL
47325	1999 XQ_{23}	—	December 6, 1999	Socorro	LINEAR	·	1.6 km	MPC · JPL
47326	1999 XP_{25}	—	December 6, 1999	Socorro	LINEAR	·	4.7 km	MPC · JPL
47327	1999 XZ_{25}	—	December 6, 1999	Socorro	LINEAR	·	3.0 km	MPC · JPL
47328	1999 XZ_{27}	—	December 6, 1999	Socorro	LINEAR	NYS	3.8 km	MPC · JPL
47329	1999 XF_{30}	—	December 6, 1999	Socorro	LINEAR	V	2.2 km	MPC · JPL
47330	1999 XQ_{31}	—	December 6, 1999	Socorro	LINEAR	slow	4.5 km	MPC · JPL
47331	1999 XB_{32}	—	December 6, 1999	Socorro	LINEAR	(5)	3.1 km	MPC · JPL
47332	1999 XC_{32}	—	December 6, 1999	Socorro	LINEAR	V	2.0 km	MPC · JPL
47333	1999 XU_{32}	—	December 6, 1999	Socorro	LINEAR	NYS	3.4 km	MPC · JPL
47334	1999 XX_{32}	—	December 6, 1999	Socorro	LINEAR	MAR	6.0 km	MPC · JPL
47335	1999 XB_{33}	—	December 6, 1999	Socorro	LINEAR	·	4.0 km	MPC · JPL
47336	1999 XT_{34}	—	December 6, 1999	Socorro	LINEAR	·	3.7 km	MPC · JPL
47337	1999 XB_{36}	—	December 6, 1999	Oizumi	T. Kobayashi	V	2.5 km	MPC · JPL
47338	1999 XG_{36}	—	December 6, 1999	Oizumi	T. Kobayashi	V	2.8 km	MPC · JPL
47339	1999 XH_{38}	—	December 3, 1999	Uenohara	N. Kawasato	·	2.6 km	MPC · JPL
47340	1999 XK_{39}	—	December 6, 1999	Socorro	LINEAR	·	1.8 km	MPC · JPL
47341	1999 XX_{41}	—	December 7, 1999	Socorro	LINEAR	·	1.7 km	MPC · JPL
47342	1999 XL_{43}	—	December 7, 1999	Socorro	LINEAR	·	2.6 km	MPC · JPL
47343	1999 XL_{45}	—	December 7, 1999	Socorro	LINEAR	·	2.7 km	MPC · JPL
47344	1999 XM_{45}	—	December 7, 1999	Socorro	LINEAR	NYS	3.2 km	MPC · JPL
47345	1999 XZ_{47}	—	December 7, 1999	Socorro	LINEAR	·	1.7 km	MPC · JPL
47346	1999 XJ_{48}	—	December 7, 1999	Socorro	LINEAR	·	2.8 km	MPC · JPL
47347	1999 XU_{49}	—	December 7, 1999	Socorro	LINEAR	·	3.6 km	MPC · JPL
47348	1999 XJ_{50}	—	December 7, 1999	Socorro	LINEAR	·	5.8 km	MPC · JPL
47349	1999 XD_{52}	—	December 7, 1999	Socorro	LINEAR	·	1.6 km	MPC · JPL
47350	1999 XR_{52}	—	December 7, 1999	Socorro	LINEAR	(1338) (FLO)	2.4 km	MPC · JPL
47351	1999 XO_{57}	—	December 7, 1999	Socorro	LINEAR	·	3.4 km	MPC · JPL
47352	1999 XE_{58}	—	December 7, 1999	Socorro	LINEAR	·	1.6 km	MPC · JPL
47353	1999 XB_{59}	—	December 7, 1999	Socorro	LINEAR	·	4.7 km	MPC · JPL
47354	1999 XU_{59}	—	December 7, 1999	Socorro	LINEAR	·	3.8 km	MPC · JPL
47355	1999 XG_{64}	—	December 7, 1999	Socorro	LINEAR	MAS	1.9 km	MPC · JPL
47356	1999 XJ_{64}	—	December 7, 1999	Socorro	LINEAR	·	1.6 km	MPC · JPL
47357	1999 XK_{64}	—	December 7, 1999	Socorro	LINEAR	·	3.4 km	MPC · JPL
47358	1999 XX_{66}	—	December 7, 1999	Socorro	LINEAR	EUN	3.8 km	MPC · JPL
47359	1999 XJ_{69}	—	December 7, 1999	Socorro	LINEAR	·	1.7 km	MPC · JPL
47360	1999 XN_{70}	—	December 7, 1999	Socorro	LINEAR	·	2.2 km	MPC · JPL
47361	1999 XL_{74}	—	December 7, 1999	Socorro	LINEAR	NYS	1.8 km	MPC · JPL
47362	1999 XG_{75}	—	December 7, 1999	Socorro	LINEAR	NYS	2.3 km	MPC · JPL
47363	1999 XX_{75}	—	December 7, 1999	Socorro	LINEAR	·	3.3 km	MPC · JPL
47364	1999 XH_{78}	—	December 7, 1999	Socorro	LINEAR	·	6.0 km	MPC · JPL
47365	1999 XY_{82}	—	December 7, 1999	Socorro	LINEAR	RAF	2.6 km	MPC · JPL
47366	1999 XO_{86}	—	December 7, 1999	Socorro	LINEAR	NYS	2.9 km	MPC · JPL
47367	1999 XB_{87}	—	December 7, 1999	Socorro	LINEAR	·	3.4 km	MPC · JPL
47368	1999 XZ_{87}	—	December 7, 1999	Socorro	LINEAR	·	2.5 km	MPC · JPL
47369	1999 XA_{88}	—	December 7, 1999	Socorro	LINEAR	V	3.6 km	MPC · JPL
47370	1999 XL_{88}	—	December 7, 1999	Socorro	LINEAR	NYS	3.6 km	MPC · JPL
47371	1999 XJ_{90}	—	December 7, 1999	Socorro	LINEAR	·	7.6 km	MPC · JPL
47372	1999 XW_{90}	—	December 7, 1999	Socorro	LINEAR	·	2.1 km	MPC · JPL
47373	1999 XT_{91}	—	December 7, 1999	Socorro	LINEAR	fast?	4.0 km	MPC · JPL
47374	1999 XX_{91}	—	December 7, 1999	Socorro	LINEAR	·	3.6 km	MPC · JPL
47375	1999 XT_{94}	—	December 7, 1999	Socorro	LINEAR	·	4.0 km	MPC · JPL
47376	1999 XW_{94}	—	December 7, 1999	Socorro	LINEAR	PAD	10 km	MPC · JPL
47377	1999 XY_{94}	—	December 7, 1999	Socorro	LINEAR	PHO	6.1 km	MPC · JPL
47378	1999 XN_{96}	—	December 7, 1999	Socorro	LINEAR	·	4.3 km	MPC · JPL
47379	1999 XB_{97}	—	December 7, 1999	Socorro	LINEAR	·	6.1 km	MPC · JPL
47380	1999 XC_{98}	—	December 7, 1999	Socorro	LINEAR	·	5.0 km	MPC · JPL
47381	1999 XQ_{98}	—	December 7, 1999	Socorro	LINEAR	(5)	3.7 km	MPC · JPL
47382	1999 XX_{98}	—	December 7, 1999	Socorro	LINEAR	V	3.2 km	MPC · JPL
47383	1999 XG_{99}	—	December 7, 1999	Socorro	LINEAR	·	2.2 km	MPC · JPL
47384	1999 XX_{99}	—	December 7, 1999	Socorro	LINEAR	·	4.3 km	MPC · JPL
47385	1999 XA_{101}	—	December 7, 1999	Socorro	LINEAR	·	4.4 km	MPC · JPL
47386	1999 XX_{101}	—	December 7, 1999	Socorro	LINEAR	·	6.8 km	MPC · JPL
47387	1999 XF_{103}	—	December 7, 1999	Socorro	LINEAR	V	1.8 km	MPC · JPL
47388	1999 XY_{103}	—	December 9, 1999	Socorro	LINEAR	EUN	5.6 km	MPC · JPL
47389	1999 XK_{106}	—	December 4, 1999	Catalina	CSS	(2076)	3.4 km	MPC · JPL
47390	1999 XA_{107}	—	December 4, 1999	Catalina	CSS	·	2.5 km	MPC · JPL
47391	1999 XL_{108}	—	December 4, 1999	Catalina	CSS	·	2.8 km	MPC · JPL
47392	1999 XT_{109}	—	December 4, 1999	Catalina	CSS	·	1.9 km	MPC · JPL
47393	1999 XX_{109}	—	December 4, 1999	Catalina	CSS	NYS	2.2 km	MPC · JPL
47394	1999 XE_{110}	—	December 4, 1999	Catalina	CSS	·	3.0 km	MPC · JPL
47395	1999 XM_{111}	—	December 8, 1999	Catalina	CSS	PHO	2.9 km	MPC · JPL
47396	1999 XB_{115}	—	December 11, 1999	Socorro	LINEAR	EUN	4.0 km	MPC · JPL
47397	1999 XS_{115}	—	December 5, 1999	Catalina	CSS	V	2.1 km	MPC · JPL
47398	1999 XC_{116}	—	December 5, 1999	Catalina	CSS	·	3.4 km	MPC · JPL
47399	1999 XK_{116}	—	December 5, 1999	Catalina	CSS	·	3.6 km	MPC · JPL
47400	1999 XV_{116}	—	December 5, 1999	Catalina	CSS	·	1.5 km	MPC · JPL

== 47401–47500 ==
back to top

Designation			Discovery			Properties		Ref
Permanent	Provisional	Named after	Date	Site	Discoverer(s)	Category	Diam.	Ref
47401	1999 XG_{120}	—	December 5, 1999	Catalina	CSS	·	3.6 km	MPC · JPL
47402	1999 XQ_{120}	—	December 5, 1999	Catalina	CSS	·	1.8 km	MPC · JPL
47403	1999 XS_{121}	—	December 5, 1999	Catalina	CSS	·	2.0 km	MPC · JPL
47404	1999 XU_{122}	—	December 7, 1999	Catalina	CSS	·	2.6 km	MPC · JPL
47405	1999 XC_{125}	—	December 7, 1999	Catalina	CSS	·	2.2 km	MPC · JPL
47406	1999 XV_{126}	—	December 7, 1999	Catalina	CSS	·	3.1 km	MPC · JPL
47407	1999 XC_{129}	—	December 12, 1999	Socorro	LINEAR	V	2.0 km	MPC · JPL
47408	1999 XH_{130}	—	December 12, 1999	Socorro	LINEAR	·	2.1 km	MPC · JPL
47409	1999 XS_{132}	—	December 12, 1999	Socorro	LINEAR	·	3.9 km	MPC · JPL
47410	1999 XE_{135}	—	December 6, 1999	Socorro	LINEAR	·	1.8 km	MPC · JPL
47411	1999 XZ_{136}	—	December 14, 1999	Fountain Hills	C. W. Juels	·	1.7 km	MPC · JPL
47412	1999 XD_{140}	—	December 2, 1999	Kitt Peak	Spacewatch	·	3.8 km	MPC · JPL
47413	1999 XR_{144}	—	December 15, 1999	Oohira	T. Urata	·	2.5 km	MPC · JPL
47414	1999 XN_{147}	—	December 7, 1999	Kitt Peak	Spacewatch	·	4.3 km	MPC · JPL
47415	1999 XD_{154}	—	December 8, 1999	Socorro	LINEAR	·	4.1 km	MPC · JPL
47416	1999 XE_{160}	—	December 8, 1999	Socorro	LINEAR	·	4.6 km	MPC · JPL
47417	1999 XL_{160}	—	December 8, 1999	Socorro	LINEAR	·	5.5 km	MPC · JPL
47418	1999 XB_{165}	—	December 8, 1999	Socorro	LINEAR	·	3.3 km	MPC · JPL
47419	1999 XT_{165}	—	December 8, 1999	Socorro	LINEAR	·	4.4 km	MPC · JPL
47420	1999 XB_{166}	—	December 10, 1999	Socorro	LINEAR	·	3.0 km	MPC · JPL
47421	1999 XN_{166}	—	December 10, 1999	Socorro	LINEAR	·	2.7 km	MPC · JPL
47422	1999 XK_{168}	—	December 10, 1999	Socorro	LINEAR	·	2.5 km	MPC · JPL
47423	1999 XR_{168}	—	December 10, 1999	Socorro	LINEAR	·	2.3 km	MPC · JPL
47424	1999 XE_{169}	—	December 10, 1999	Socorro	LINEAR	·	3.7 km	MPC · JPL
47425	1999 XW_{169}	—	December 10, 1999	Socorro	LINEAR	·	4.4 km	MPC · JPL
47426	1999 XZ_{169}	—	December 10, 1999	Socorro	LINEAR	slow	3.0 km	MPC · JPL
47427	1999 XA_{172}	—	December 10, 1999	Socorro	LINEAR	·	2.6 km	MPC · JPL
47428	1999 XK_{172}	—	December 10, 1999	Socorro	LINEAR	·	2.3 km	MPC · JPL
47429	1999 XN_{172}	—	December 10, 1999	Socorro	LINEAR	·	6.2 km	MPC · JPL
47430	1999 XK_{173}	—	December 10, 1999	Socorro	LINEAR	·	4.9 km	MPC · JPL
47431	1999 XZ_{173}	—	December 10, 1999	Socorro	LINEAR	·	5.0 km	MPC · JPL
47432	1999 XT_{175}	—	December 10, 1999	Socorro	LINEAR	·	3.6 km	MPC · JPL
47433	1999 XB_{176}	—	December 10, 1999	Socorro	LINEAR	·	3.3 km	MPC · JPL
47434	1999 XD_{176}	—	December 10, 1999	Socorro	LINEAR	·	4.4 km	MPC · JPL
47435	1999 XK_{176}	—	December 10, 1999	Socorro	LINEAR	·	9.6 km	MPC · JPL
47436	1999 XM_{176}	—	December 10, 1999	Socorro	LINEAR	·	4.2 km	MPC · JPL
47437	1999 XR_{176}	—	December 10, 1999	Socorro	LINEAR	·	5.1 km	MPC · JPL
47438	1999 XD_{177}	—	December 10, 1999	Socorro	LINEAR	·	2.8 km	MPC · JPL
47439	1999 XB_{178}	—	December 10, 1999	Socorro	LINEAR	·	3.9 km	MPC · JPL
47440	1999 XV_{181}	—	December 12, 1999	Socorro	LINEAR	·	2.9 km	MPC · JPL
47441	1999 XS_{192}	—	December 12, 1999	Socorro	LINEAR	V	1.7 km	MPC · JPL
47442	1999 XG_{193}	—	December 12, 1999	Socorro	LINEAR	·	1.8 km	MPC · JPL
47443	1999 XE_{196}	—	December 12, 1999	Socorro	LINEAR	·	2.9 km	MPC · JPL
47444	1999 XA_{205}	—	December 12, 1999	Socorro	LINEAR	·	4.4 km	MPC · JPL
47445	1999 XQ_{206}	—	December 12, 1999	Socorro	LINEAR	EUN	3.8 km	MPC · JPL
47446	1999 XM_{211}	—	December 13, 1999	Socorro	LINEAR	·	2.6 km	MPC · JPL
47447	1999 XW_{213}	—	December 14, 1999	Socorro	LINEAR	·	1.7 km	MPC · JPL
47448	1999 XN_{214}	—	December 14, 1999	Socorro	LINEAR	NYS	2.6 km	MPC · JPL
47449	1999 XM_{215}	—	December 14, 1999	Socorro	LINEAR	(2076)	2.9 km	MPC · JPL
47450	1999 XD_{218}	—	December 13, 1999	Kitt Peak	Spacewatch	·	4.5 km	MPC · JPL
47451	1999 XR_{221}	—	December 15, 1999	Socorro	LINEAR	·	1.9 km	MPC · JPL
47452	1999 XY_{221}	—	December 15, 1999	Socorro	LINEAR	·	3.9 km	MPC · JPL
47453	1999 XB_{222}	—	December 15, 1999	Socorro	LINEAR	·	3.3 km	MPC · JPL
47454	1999 XL_{222}	—	December 15, 1999	Socorro	LINEAR	V	2.4 km	MPC · JPL
47455	1999 XK_{227}	—	December 15, 1999	Kitt Peak	Spacewatch	·	1.7 km	MPC · JPL
47456	1999 XZ_{231}	—	December 9, 1999	Catalina	CSS	PHO	7.1 km	MPC · JPL
47457	1999 XF_{234}	—	December 4, 1999	Anderson Mesa	LONEOS	·	4.8 km	MPC · JPL
47458	1999 XR_{238}	—	December 4, 1999	Catalina	CSS	·	4.2 km	MPC · JPL
47459	1999 XO_{241}	—	December 13, 1999	Anderson Mesa	LONEOS	·	3.2 km	MPC · JPL
47460	1999 XQ_{241}	—	December 13, 1999	Anderson Mesa	LONEOS	·	3.2 km	MPC · JPL
47461	1999 XG_{242}	—	December 13, 1999	Anderson Mesa	LONEOS	·	7.1 km	MPC · JPL
47462	1999 XG_{256}	—	December 7, 1999	Catalina	CSS	·	3.8 km	MPC · JPL
47463	1999 XE_{258}	—	December 8, 1999	Catalina	CSS	·	4.7 km	MPC · JPL
47464	1999 YM_{3}	—	December 18, 1999	Socorro	LINEAR	·	4.7 km	MPC · JPL
47465	1999 YZ_{4}	—	December 28, 1999	Prescott	P. G. Comba	·	3.1 km	MPC · JPL
47466 Mayatoyoshima	1999 YJ_{9}	Mayatoyoshima	December 31, 1999	Goodricke-Pigott	R. A. Tucker	PHO	2.2 km	MPC · JPL
47467	1999 YF_{13}	—	December 30, 1999	Anderson Mesa	LONEOS	V	2.4 km	MPC · JPL
47468	1999 YS_{13}	—	December 30, 1999	Višnjan Observatory	K. Korlević	NYS	4.5 km	MPC · JPL
47469	1999 YT_{20}	—	December 30, 1999	Mauna Kea	Veillet, C.	·	3.3 km	MPC · JPL
47470	2000 AF	—	January 2, 2000	Fountain Hills	C. W. Juels	(2076)	2.5 km	MPC · JPL
47471	2000 AM	—	January 2, 2000	Fountain Hills	C. W. Juels	·	4.8 km	MPC · JPL
47472	2000 AN_{2}	—	January 3, 2000	Oizumi	T. Kobayashi	·	5.5 km	MPC · JPL
47473 Lorenzopinna	2000 AU_{2}	Lorenzopinna	January 1, 2000	San Marcello	M. Tombelli, A. Boattini	NYS	3.4 km	MPC · JPL
47474	2000 AH_{5}	—	January 3, 2000	Olathe	Olathe	·	3.0 km	MPC · JPL
47475	2000 AR_{7}	—	January 2, 2000	Socorro	LINEAR	V	2.5 km	MPC · JPL
47476	2000 AJ_{8}	—	January 2, 2000	Socorro	LINEAR	·	3.5 km	MPC · JPL
47477	2000 AV_{9}	—	January 2, 2000	Socorro	LINEAR	V	2.2 km	MPC · JPL
47478	2000 AW_{10}	—	January 3, 2000	Socorro	LINEAR	·	2.5 km	MPC · JPL
47479	2000 AH_{11}	—	January 3, 2000	Socorro	LINEAR	V	1.6 km	MPC · JPL
47480	2000 AE_{12}	—	January 3, 2000	Socorro	LINEAR	·	3.8 km	MPC · JPL
47481	2000 AR_{12}	—	January 3, 2000	Socorro	LINEAR	·	3.3 km	MPC · JPL
47482	2000 AT_{13}	—	January 3, 2000	Socorro	LINEAR	EUN	2.7 km	MPC · JPL
47483	2000 AJ_{17}	—	January 3, 2000	Socorro	LINEAR	EUN	4.7 km	MPC · JPL
47484	2000 AC_{18}	—	January 3, 2000	Socorro	LINEAR	V · slow	2.0 km	MPC · JPL
47485	2000 AO_{22}	—	January 3, 2000	Socorro	LINEAR	GEF	4.5 km	MPC · JPL
47486	2000 AG_{25}	—	January 3, 2000	Socorro	LINEAR	MAS	1.5 km	MPC · JPL
47487	2000 AK_{30}	—	January 3, 2000	Socorro	LINEAR	MAS	2.4 km	MPC · JPL
47488	2000 AZ_{32}	—	January 3, 2000	Socorro	LINEAR	·	5.3 km	MPC · JPL
47489	2000 AY_{35}	—	January 3, 2000	Socorro	LINEAR	·	5.3 km	MPC · JPL
47490	2000 AE_{37}	—	January 3, 2000	Socorro	LINEAR	·	2.0 km	MPC · JPL
47491	2000 AE_{39}	—	January 3, 2000	Socorro	LINEAR	·	4.0 km	MPC · JPL
47492	2000 AC_{41}	—	January 3, 2000	Socorro	LINEAR	·	3.2 km	MPC · JPL
47493	2000 AV_{41}	—	January 3, 2000	Socorro	LINEAR	·	2.7 km	MPC · JPL
47494 Gerhardangl	2000 AH_{42}	Gerhardangl	January 4, 2000	Gnosca	S. Sposetti	·	2.7 km	MPC · JPL
47495	2000 AD_{43}	—	January 5, 2000	Socorro	LINEAR	·	5.7 km	MPC · JPL
47496	2000 AU_{43}	—	January 2, 2000	Kitt Peak	Spacewatch	·	2.0 km	MPC · JPL
47497	2000 AE_{44}	—	January 2, 2000	Kitt Peak	Spacewatch	·	2.9 km	MPC · JPL
47498	2000 AK_{45}	—	January 3, 2000	Socorro	LINEAR	V	2.1 km	MPC · JPL
47499	2000 AH_{50}	—	January 5, 2000	Višnjan Observatory	K. Korlević	·	2.2 km	MPC · JPL
47500	2000 AX_{50}	—	January 7, 2000	Kleť	Kleť	·	2.4 km	MPC · JPL

== 47501–47600 ==
back to top

Designation			Discovery			Properties		Ref
Permanent	Provisional	Named after	Date	Site	Discoverer(s)	Category	Diam.	Ref
47501	2000 AN_{53}	—	January 4, 2000	Socorro	LINEAR	·	4.8 km	MPC · JPL
47502	2000 AN_{54}	—	January 4, 2000	Socorro	LINEAR	·	3.6 km	MPC · JPL
47503	2000 AQ_{54}	—	January 4, 2000	Socorro	LINEAR	MAS	1.7 km	MPC · JPL
47504	2000 AJ_{56}	—	January 4, 2000	Socorro	LINEAR	·	4.8 km	MPC · JPL
47505	2000 AB_{57}	—	January 4, 2000	Socorro	LINEAR	WIT	2.5 km	MPC · JPL
47506	2000 AA_{58}	—	January 4, 2000	Socorro	LINEAR	fast?	6.1 km	MPC · JPL
47507	2000 AM_{58}	—	January 4, 2000	Socorro	LINEAR	·	3.8 km	MPC · JPL
47508	2000 AQ_{58}	—	January 4, 2000	Socorro	LINEAR	·	3.9 km	MPC · JPL
47509	2000 AJ_{60}	—	January 4, 2000	Socorro	LINEAR	·	2.6 km	MPC · JPL
47510	2000 AL_{60}	—	January 4, 2000	Socorro	LINEAR	GEF	4.2 km	MPC · JPL
47511	2000 AN_{60}	—	January 4, 2000	Socorro	LINEAR	·	9.4 km	MPC · JPL
47512	2000 AY_{60}	—	January 4, 2000	Socorro	LINEAR	·	4.1 km	MPC · JPL
47513	2000 AS_{66}	—	January 4, 2000	Socorro	LINEAR	PHO	6.6 km	MPC · JPL
47514	2000 AW_{66}	—	January 4, 2000	Socorro	LINEAR	GEF	4.6 km	MPC · JPL
47515	2000 AB_{69}	—	January 5, 2000	Socorro	LINEAR	·	1.9 km	MPC · JPL
47516	2000 AQ_{69}	—	January 5, 2000	Socorro	LINEAR	EUN	4.8 km	MPC · JPL
47517	2000 AT_{71}	—	January 5, 2000	Socorro	LINEAR	·	2.7 km	MPC · JPL
47518	2000 AU_{71}	—	January 5, 2000	Socorro	LINEAR	·	1.9 km	MPC · JPL
47519	2000 AK_{79}	—	January 5, 2000	Socorro	LINEAR	·	3.6 km	MPC · JPL
47520	2000 AO_{79}	—	January 5, 2000	Socorro	LINEAR	V	1.9 km	MPC · JPL
47521	2000 AS_{84}	—	January 5, 2000	Socorro	LINEAR	·	4.1 km	MPC · JPL
47522	2000 AW_{84}	—	January 5, 2000	Socorro	LINEAR	·	2.2 km	MPC · JPL
47523	2000 AB_{85}	—	January 5, 2000	Socorro	LINEAR	·	2.5 km	MPC · JPL
47524	2000 AJ_{90}	—	January 5, 2000	Socorro	LINEAR	·	6.1 km	MPC · JPL
47525	2000 AL_{90}	—	January 5, 2000	Socorro	LINEAR	·	2.9 km	MPC · JPL
47526	2000 AM_{90}	—	January 5, 2000	Socorro	LINEAR	NYS	4.3 km	MPC · JPL
47527	2000 AR_{90}	—	January 5, 2000	Socorro	LINEAR	·	3.0 km	MPC · JPL
47528	2000 AE_{95}	—	January 4, 2000	Socorro	LINEAR	·	3.2 km	MPC · JPL
47529	2000 AM_{96}	—	January 4, 2000	Socorro	LINEAR	MAR	3.9 km	MPC · JPL
47530	2000 AO_{96}	—	January 4, 2000	Socorro	LINEAR	EUN	5.7 km	MPC · JPL
47531	2000 AY_{96}	—	January 4, 2000	Socorro	LINEAR	GEF	5.0 km	MPC · JPL
47532	2000 AF_{97}	—	January 4, 2000	Socorro	LINEAR	EUN	5.9 km	MPC · JPL
47533	2000 AY_{97}	—	January 4, 2000	Socorro	LINEAR	GEF	4.7 km	MPC · JPL
47534	2000 AD_{98}	—	January 4, 2000	Socorro	LINEAR	HYG	8.8 km	MPC · JPL
47535	2000 AA_{99}	—	January 5, 2000	Socorro	LINEAR	·	2.1 km	MPC · JPL
47536	2000 AB_{102}	—	January 5, 2000	Socorro	LINEAR	·	3.4 km	MPC · JPL
47537	2000 AP_{108}	—	January 5, 2000	Socorro	LINEAR	·	3.6 km	MPC · JPL
47538	2000 AR_{113}	—	January 5, 2000	Socorro	LINEAR	·	3.4 km	MPC · JPL
47539	2000 AZ_{113}	—	January 5, 2000	Socorro	LINEAR	EUN	4.6 km	MPC · JPL
47540	2000 AK_{115}	—	January 5, 2000	Socorro	LINEAR	·	4.2 km	MPC · JPL
47541	2000 AX_{115}	—	January 5, 2000	Socorro	LINEAR	·	4.0 km	MPC · JPL
47542	2000 AN_{118}	—	January 5, 2000	Socorro	LINEAR	·	3.7 km	MPC · JPL
47543	2000 AP_{118}	—	January 5, 2000	Socorro	LINEAR	·	3.4 km	MPC · JPL
47544	2000 AW_{118}	—	January 5, 2000	Socorro	LINEAR	·	2.8 km	MPC · JPL
47545	2000 AZ_{118}	—	January 5, 2000	Socorro	LINEAR	HNS	3.0 km	MPC · JPL
47546	2000 AN_{119}	—	January 5, 2000	Socorro	LINEAR	·	3.9 km	MPC · JPL
47547	2000 AM_{121}	—	January 5, 2000	Socorro	LINEAR	CYB	8.7 km	MPC · JPL
47548	2000 AO_{124}	—	January 5, 2000	Socorro	LINEAR	·	5.5 km	MPC · JPL
47549	2000 AE_{126}	—	January 5, 2000	Socorro	LINEAR	MAR	3.4 km	MPC · JPL
47550	2000 AS_{126}	—	January 5, 2000	Socorro	LINEAR	·	3.6 km	MPC · JPL
47551	2000 AM_{128}	—	January 5, 2000	Socorro	LINEAR	·	8.3 km	MPC · JPL
47552	2000 AR_{128}	—	January 5, 2000	Socorro	LINEAR	·	13 km	MPC · JPL
47553	2000 AE_{129}	—	January 5, 2000	Socorro	LINEAR	NYS	3.2 km	MPC · JPL
47554	2000 AN_{130}	—	January 5, 2000	Socorro	LINEAR	HYG	6.6 km	MPC · JPL
47555	2000 AM_{136}	—	January 4, 2000	Socorro	LINEAR	·	5.5 km	MPC · JPL
47556	2000 AL_{137}	—	January 4, 2000	Socorro	LINEAR	HYG	13 km	MPC · JPL
47557	2000 AP_{137}	—	January 4, 2000	Socorro	LINEAR	HOF	10 km	MPC · JPL
47558	2000 AU_{137}	—	January 4, 2000	Socorro	LINEAR	EUN	5.3 km	MPC · JPL
47559	2000 AK_{143}	—	January 5, 2000	Socorro	LINEAR	DOR	9.5 km	MPC · JPL
47560	2000 AD_{144}	—	January 5, 2000	Socorro	LINEAR	·	10 km	MPC · JPL
47561	2000 AA_{147}	—	January 4, 2000	Oizumi	T. Kobayashi	EUN	5.2 km	MPC · JPL
47562	2000 AZ_{148}	—	January 7, 2000	Socorro	LINEAR	·	5.1 km	MPC · JPL
47563	2000 AW_{149}	—	January 7, 2000	Socorro	LINEAR	GEF	3.2 km	MPC · JPL
47564	2000 AD_{150}	—	January 7, 2000	Socorro	LINEAR	·	5.7 km	MPC · JPL
47565	2000 AJ_{150}	—	January 7, 2000	Socorro	LINEAR	·	5.3 km	MPC · JPL
47566	2000 AU_{150}	—	January 8, 2000	Socorro	LINEAR	·	5.1 km	MPC · JPL
47567	2000 AL_{154}	—	January 2, 2000	Socorro	LINEAR	·	4.6 km	MPC · JPL
47568	2000 AW_{155}	—	January 3, 2000	Socorro	LINEAR	·	3.0 km	MPC · JPL
47569	2000 AP_{159}	—	January 3, 2000	Socorro	LINEAR	·	7.3 km	MPC · JPL
47570	2000 AM_{162}	—	January 4, 2000	Socorro	LINEAR	EUN	3.4 km	MPC · JPL
47571	2000 AT_{162}	—	January 4, 2000	Socorro	LINEAR	·	4.0 km	MPC · JPL
47572	2000 AK_{167}	—	January 8, 2000	Socorro	LINEAR	·	4.0 km	MPC · JPL
47573	2000 AV_{170}	—	January 7, 2000	Socorro	LINEAR	·	2.8 km	MPC · JPL
47574	2000 AF_{171}	—	January 7, 2000	Socorro	LINEAR	·	3.4 km	MPC · JPL
47575	2000 AL_{172}	—	January 7, 2000	Socorro	LINEAR	·	3.4 km	MPC · JPL
47576	2000 AW_{172}	—	January 7, 2000	Socorro	LINEAR	·	960 m	MPC · JPL
47577	2000 AD_{173}	—	January 7, 2000	Socorro	LINEAR	·	2.3 km	MPC · JPL
47578	2000 AT_{174}	—	January 7, 2000	Socorro	LINEAR	·	3.7 km	MPC · JPL
47579	2000 AW_{174}	—	January 7, 2000	Socorro	LINEAR	V	3.0 km	MPC · JPL
47580	2000 AQ_{175}	—	January 7, 2000	Socorro	LINEAR	·	2.6 km	MPC · JPL
47581	2000 AN_{178}	—	January 7, 2000	Socorro	LINEAR	·	1.8 km	MPC · JPL
47582	2000 AO_{179}	—	January 7, 2000	Socorro	LINEAR	EUN	4.4 km	MPC · JPL
47583	2000 AW_{182}	—	January 7, 2000	Socorro	LINEAR	MAR	3.2 km	MPC · JPL
47584	2000 AX_{182}	—	January 7, 2000	Socorro	LINEAR	·	3.4 km	MPC · JPL
47585	2000 AA_{192}	—	January 8, 2000	Socorro	LINEAR	·	4.3 km	MPC · JPL
47586	2000 AE_{193}	—	January 8, 2000	Socorro	LINEAR	·	5.1 km	MPC · JPL
47587	2000 AU_{198}	—	January 8, 2000	Socorro	LINEAR	MAR	2.7 km	MPC · JPL
47588	2000 AM_{201}	—	January 9, 2000	Socorro	LINEAR	·	2.3 km	MPC · JPL
47589	2000 AY_{201}	—	January 9, 2000	Socorro	LINEAR	·	5.9 km	MPC · JPL
47590	2000 AY_{202}	—	January 10, 2000	Socorro	LINEAR	EUN	4.4 km	MPC · JPL
47591	2000 AD_{203}	—	January 10, 2000	Socorro	LINEAR	·	4.4 km	MPC · JPL
47592	2000 AO_{203}	—	January 10, 2000	Socorro	LINEAR	·	5.2 km	MPC · JPL
47593	2000 AF_{204}	—	January 12, 2000	High Point	D. K. Chesney	·	7.6 km	MPC · JPL
47594	2000 AQ_{204}	—	January 8, 2000	Socorro	LINEAR	EUN	4.7 km	MPC · JPL
47595	2000 AK_{207}	—	January 3, 2000	Kitt Peak	Spacewatch	THM	6.9 km	MPC · JPL
47596	2000 AA_{213}	—	January 6, 2000	Kitt Peak	Spacewatch	MAS	1.6 km	MPC · JPL
47597	2000 AK_{214}	—	January 6, 2000	Kitt Peak	Spacewatch	·	4.5 km	MPC · JPL
47598	2000 AR_{215}	—	January 7, 2000	Kitt Peak	Spacewatch	WIT	2.8 km	MPC · JPL
47599	2000 AB_{216}	—	January 7, 2000	Kitt Peak	Spacewatch	ADE	5.6 km	MPC · JPL
47600	2000 AF_{227}	—	January 10, 2000	Kitt Peak	Spacewatch	HYG	8.4 km	MPC · JPL

== 47601–47700 ==
back to top

Designation			Discovery			Properties		Ref
Permanent	Provisional	Named after	Date	Site	Discoverer(s)	Category	Diam.	Ref
47601	2000 AQ_{227}	—	January 10, 2000	Kitt Peak	Spacewatch	HYG	5.9 km	MPC · JPL
47602	2000 AC_{231}	—	January 4, 2000	Anderson Mesa	LONEOS	·	6.5 km	MPC · JPL
47603	2000 AV_{232}	—	January 4, 2000	Socorro	LINEAR	NYS	3.6 km	MPC · JPL
47604	2000 AF_{236}	—	January 5, 2000	Anderson Mesa	LONEOS	·	5.1 km	MPC · JPL
47605	2000 AT_{237}	—	January 5, 2000	Socorro	LINEAR	·	6.4 km	MPC · JPL
47606	2000 AA_{238}	—	January 6, 2000	Anderson Mesa	LONEOS	·	3.1 km	MPC · JPL
47607	2000 AN_{242}	—	January 7, 2000	Socorro	LINEAR	·	4.4 km	MPC · JPL
47608	2000 AE_{243}	—	January 7, 2000	Anderson Mesa	LONEOS	EOS	9.2 km	MPC · JPL
47609	2000 AN_{251}	—	January 5, 2000	Socorro	LINEAR	THM	8.4 km	MPC · JPL
47610	2000 AY_{254}	—	January 6, 2000	Socorro	LINEAR	·	2.1 km	MPC · JPL
47611	2000 BL_{1}	—	January 26, 2000	Kitt Peak	Spacewatch	KOR	2.7 km	MPC · JPL
47612	2000 BO_{4}	—	January 21, 2000	Socorro	LINEAR	·	4.4 km	MPC · JPL
47613	2000 BP_{12}	—	January 28, 2000	Kitt Peak	Spacewatch	·	9.4 km	MPC · JPL
47614	2000 BO_{14}	—	January 28, 2000	Oizumi	T. Kobayashi	·	11 km	MPC · JPL
47615	2000 BT_{22}	—	January 27, 2000	Višnjan Observatory	K. Korlević	THM	7.0 km	MPC · JPL
47616	2000 BC_{26}	—	January 30, 2000	Socorro	LINEAR	THM	9.0 km	MPC · JPL
47617	2000 BC_{27}	—	January 30, 2000	Socorro	LINEAR	·	5.8 km	MPC · JPL
47618	2000 BD_{27}	—	January 30, 2000	Socorro	LINEAR	·	5.0 km	MPC · JPL
47619 Johnpursch	2000 BW_{28}	Johnpursch	January 30, 2000	Catalina	CSS	BRA	3.9 km	MPC · JPL
47620 Joeplassmann	2000 BA_{29}	Joeplassmann	January 30, 2000	Catalina	CSS	RAF	2.8 km	MPC · JPL
47621	2000 BO_{29}	—	January 28, 2000	Socorro	LINEAR	·	4.6 km	MPC · JPL
47622	2000 BQ_{32}	—	January 28, 2000	Kitt Peak	Spacewatch	AST	3.5 km	MPC · JPL
47623	2000 BF_{38}	—	January 28, 2000	Kitt Peak	Spacewatch	·	3.7 km	MPC · JPL
47624	2000 BG_{41}	—	January 30, 2000	Kitt Peak	Spacewatch	·	4.9 km	MPC · JPL
47625	2000 BB_{49}	—	January 26, 2000	Kitt Peak	Spacewatch	·	4.7 km	MPC · JPL
47626	2000 BS_{49}	—	January 21, 2000	Socorro	LINEAR	·	2.7 km	MPC · JPL
47627 Kendomanik	2000 CX	Kendomanik	February 1, 2000	Catalina	CSS	·	9.3 km	MPC · JPL
47628	2000 CJ_{2}	—	February 2, 2000	Oizumi	T. Kobayashi	·	5.0 km	MPC · JPL
47629	2000 CR_{4}	—	February 2, 2000	Socorro	LINEAR	·	3.8 km	MPC · JPL
47630	2000 CF_{6}	—	February 2, 2000	Socorro	LINEAR	V	1.9 km	MPC · JPL
47631	2000 CY_{17}	—	February 2, 2000	Socorro	LINEAR	·	4.0 km	MPC · JPL
47632	2000 CA_{21}	—	February 2, 2000	Socorro	LINEAR	·	6.7 km	MPC · JPL
47633	2000 CG_{23}	—	February 2, 2000	Socorro	LINEAR	·	3.7 km	MPC · JPL
47634	2000 CN_{24}	—	February 2, 2000	Socorro	LINEAR	·	4.2 km	MPC · JPL
47635	2000 CH_{25}	—	February 2, 2000	Socorro	LINEAR	·	3.1 km	MPC · JPL
47636	2000 CV_{25}	—	February 2, 2000	Socorro	LINEAR	·	5.1 km	MPC · JPL
47637	2000 CD_{28}	—	February 2, 2000	Socorro	LINEAR	·	3.2 km	MPC · JPL
47638	2000 CP_{28}	—	February 2, 2000	Socorro	LINEAR	·	4.6 km	MPC · JPL
47639	2000 CT_{29}	—	February 2, 2000	Socorro	LINEAR	THM	6.5 km	MPC · JPL
47640	2000 CA_{30}	—	February 2, 2000	Socorro	LINEAR	KOR	3.5 km	MPC · JPL
47641	2000 CE_{30}	—	February 2, 2000	Socorro	LINEAR	VER	6.6 km	MPC · JPL
47642	2000 CF_{30}	—	February 2, 2000	Socorro	LINEAR	·	2.1 km	MPC · JPL
47643	2000 CM_{30}	—	February 2, 2000	Socorro	LINEAR	·	5.0 km	MPC · JPL
47644	2000 CO_{36}	—	February 2, 2000	Socorro	LINEAR	·	12 km	MPC · JPL
47645	2000 CD_{37}	—	February 2, 2000	Socorro	LINEAR	EOS	7.5 km	MPC · JPL
47646	2000 CE_{37}	—	February 2, 2000	Socorro	LINEAR	EOS	5.7 km	MPC · JPL
47647	2000 CH_{38}	—	February 3, 2000	Socorro	LINEAR	·	3.9 km	MPC · JPL
47648	2000 CA_{40}	—	February 2, 2000	Socorro	LINEAR	·	3.6 km	MPC · JPL
47649 Susanbrew	2000 CP_{40}	Susanbrew	February 1, 2000	Catalina	CSS	·	4.7 km	MPC · JPL
47650 Tuthill	2000 CU_{40}	Tuthill	February 1, 2000	Catalina	CSS	(16286)	5.5 km	MPC · JPL
47651	2000 CV_{42}	—	February 2, 2000	Socorro	LINEAR	·	5.4 km	MPC · JPL
47652	2000 CL_{44}	—	February 2, 2000	Socorro	LINEAR	·	9.6 km	MPC · JPL
47653	2000 CD_{45}	—	February 2, 2000	Socorro	LINEAR	·	8.2 km	MPC · JPL
47654	2000 CP_{46}	—	February 2, 2000	Socorro	LINEAR	·	3.0 km	MPC · JPL
47655	2000 CB_{48}	—	February 2, 2000	Socorro	LINEAR	TIR	7.8 km	MPC · JPL
47656	2000 CD_{48}	—	February 2, 2000	Socorro	LINEAR	·	5.8 km	MPC · JPL
47657	2000 CE_{48}	—	February 2, 2000	Socorro	LINEAR	GEF	4.4 km	MPC · JPL
47658	2000 CL_{48}	—	February 2, 2000	Socorro	LINEAR	·	3.1 km	MPC · JPL
47659	2000 CM_{49}	—	February 2, 2000	Socorro	LINEAR	EUN	4.9 km	MPC · JPL
47660	2000 CA_{51}	—	February 2, 2000	Socorro	LINEAR	·	4.8 km	MPC · JPL
47661	2000 CP_{52}	—	February 2, 2000	Socorro	LINEAR	·	6.8 km	MPC · JPL
47662	2000 CN_{53}	—	February 2, 2000	Socorro	LINEAR	KOR	5.7 km	MPC · JPL
47663	2000 CD_{54}	—	February 2, 2000	Socorro	LINEAR	·	7.5 km	MPC · JPL
47664	2000 CE_{54}	—	February 2, 2000	Socorro	LINEAR	(1298)	10 km	MPC · JPL
47665	2000 CX_{55}	—	February 4, 2000	Socorro	LINEAR	·	4.0 km	MPC · JPL
47666	2000 CA_{58}	—	February 5, 2000	Socorro	LINEAR	EOS	6.0 km	MPC · JPL
47667	2000 CD_{58}	—	February 5, 2000	Socorro	LINEAR	EOS	7.5 km	MPC · JPL
47668	2000 CM_{60}	—	February 2, 2000	Socorro	LINEAR	·	7.0 km	MPC · JPL
47669	2000 CC_{62}	—	February 2, 2000	Socorro	LINEAR	·	3.7 km	MPC · JPL
47670	2000 CA_{63}	—	February 2, 2000	Socorro	LINEAR	MAR	3.5 km	MPC · JPL
47671	2000 CP_{63}	—	February 2, 2000	Socorro	LINEAR	·	3.5 km	MPC · JPL
47672	2000 CZ_{63}	—	February 2, 2000	Socorro	LINEAR	·	3.6 km	MPC · JPL
47673	2000 CF_{64}	—	February 3, 2000	Socorro	LINEAR	·	5.0 km	MPC · JPL
47674	2000 CT_{65}	—	February 4, 2000	Socorro	LINEAR	·	5.3 km	MPC · JPL
47675	2000 CW_{66}	—	February 6, 2000	Socorro	LINEAR	PHO	2.3 km	MPC · JPL
47676	2000 CE_{71}	—	February 7, 2000	Socorro	LINEAR	·	8.2 km	MPC · JPL
47677	2000 CO_{71}	—	February 7, 2000	Socorro	LINEAR	·	3.4 km	MPC · JPL
47678	2000 CT_{75}	—	February 7, 2000	Socorro	LINEAR	·	16 km	MPC · JPL
47679	2000 CN_{76}	—	February 10, 2000	Višnjan Observatory	K. Korlević	THM	8.6 km	MPC · JPL
47680	2000 CC_{77}	—	February 10, 2000	Višnjan Observatory	K. Korlević	EOS	4.8 km	MPC · JPL
47681	2000 CZ_{77}	—	February 7, 2000	Kitt Peak	Spacewatch	·	4.3 km	MPC · JPL
47682	2000 CO_{82}	—	February 4, 2000	Socorro	LINEAR	·	4.3 km	MPC · JPL
47683	2000 CR_{82}	—	February 4, 2000	Socorro	LINEAR	·	9.2 km	MPC · JPL
47684	2000 CT_{83}	—	February 4, 2000	Socorro	LINEAR	·	5.3 km	MPC · JPL
47685	2000 CC_{84}	—	February 4, 2000	Socorro	LINEAR	·	4.8 km	MPC · JPL
47686	2000 CA_{86}	—	February 4, 2000	Socorro	LINEAR	·	7.2 km	MPC · JPL
47687	2000 CW_{86}	—	February 4, 2000	Socorro	LINEAR	·	4.6 km	MPC · JPL
47688	2000 CO_{88}	—	February 4, 2000	Socorro	LINEAR	·	5.0 km	MPC · JPL
47689	2000 CN_{91}	—	February 6, 2000	Socorro	LINEAR	·	7.0 km	MPC · JPL
47690	2000 CQ_{92}	—	February 6, 2000	Socorro	LINEAR	·	7.1 km	MPC · JPL
47691	2000 CT_{92}	—	February 6, 2000	Socorro	LINEAR	KOR	5.3 km	MPC · JPL
47692	2000 CC_{94}	—	February 8, 2000	Socorro	LINEAR	·	9.9 km	MPC · JPL
47693	2000 CG_{94}	—	February 8, 2000	Socorro	LINEAR	·	4.6 km	MPC · JPL
47694	2000 CO_{94}	—	February 8, 2000	Socorro	LINEAR	·	4.0 km	MPC · JPL
47695	2000 CC_{99}	—	February 8, 2000	Kitt Peak	Spacewatch	NYS	1.8 km	MPC · JPL
47696	2000 CK_{100}	—	February 10, 2000	Kitt Peak	Spacewatch	EOS	3.7 km	MPC · JPL
47697	2000 CZ_{101}	—	February 2, 2000	Socorro	LINEAR	·	5.1 km	MPC · JPL
47698	2000 CG_{109}	—	February 5, 2000	Catalina	CSS	·	4.3 km	MPC · JPL
47699	2000 CP_{116}	—	February 3, 2000	Socorro	LINEAR	·	3.4 km	MPC · JPL
47700	2000 CQ_{121}	—	February 3, 2000	Socorro	LINEAR	KOR	3.6 km	MPC · JPL

== 47701–47800 ==
back to top

Designation			Discovery			Properties		Ref
Permanent	Provisional	Named after	Date	Site	Discoverer(s)	Category	Diam.	Ref
47701	2000 DA_{1}	—	February 25, 2000	Socorro	LINEAR	·	6.0 km	MPC · JPL
47702	2000 DE_{2}	—	February 26, 2000	Kitt Peak	Spacewatch	·	7.6 km	MPC · JPL
47703	2000 DR_{2}	—	February 27, 2000	Kitt Peak	Spacewatch	·	3.4 km	MPC · JPL
47704	2000 DN_{4}	—	February 28, 2000	Socorro	LINEAR	·	4.6 km	MPC · JPL
47705	2000 DT_{9}	—	February 26, 2000	Kitt Peak	Spacewatch	·	5.2 km	MPC · JPL
47706	2000 DH_{12}	—	February 27, 2000	Kitt Peak	Spacewatch	EOS	5.3 km	MPC · JPL
47707 Jamieson	2000 DB_{15}	Jamieson	February 26, 2000	Catalina	CSS	EUN	5.6 km	MPC · JPL
47708 Jimhamilton	2000 DR_{15}	Jimhamilton	February 26, 2000	Catalina	CSS	EOS	5.6 km	MPC · JPL
47709	2000 DC_{16}	—	February 28, 2000	Višnjan Observatory	K. Korlević	·	5.1 km	MPC · JPL
47710	2000 DJ_{16}	—	February 29, 2000	Višnjan Observatory	K. Korlević	URS	12 km	MPC · JPL
47711	2000 DL_{16}	—	February 29, 2000	Višnjan Observatory	K. Korlević	·	5.8 km	MPC · JPL
47712	2000 DB_{23}	—	February 29, 2000	Socorro	LINEAR	·	2.3 km	MPC · JPL
47713	2000 DM_{23}	—	February 29, 2000	Socorro	LINEAR	·	7.3 km	MPC · JPL
47714	2000 DS_{24}	—	February 29, 2000	Socorro	LINEAR	·	7.1 km	MPC · JPL
47715	2000 DG_{25}	—	February 29, 2000	Socorro	LINEAR	fast	4.7 km	MPC · JPL
47716	2000 DQ_{25}	—	February 29, 2000	Socorro	LINEAR	EOS	4.4 km	MPC · JPL
47717	2000 DU_{28}	—	February 29, 2000	Socorro	LINEAR	·	5.7 km	MPC · JPL
47718	2000 DV_{29}	—	February 29, 2000	Socorro	LINEAR	AGN	2.6 km	MPC · JPL
47719	2000 DC_{30}	—	February 29, 2000	Socorro	LINEAR	·	6.5 km	MPC · JPL
47720	2000 DR_{34}	—	February 29, 2000	Socorro	LINEAR	·	6.9 km	MPC · JPL
47721	2000 DS_{34}	—	February 29, 2000	Socorro	LINEAR	·	4.1 km	MPC · JPL
47722	2000 DZ_{35}	—	February 29, 2000	Socorro	LINEAR	·	4.0 km	MPC · JPL
47723	2000 DV_{37}	—	February 29, 2000	Socorro	LINEAR	·	3.4 km	MPC · JPL
47724	2000 DE_{38}	—	February 29, 2000	Socorro	LINEAR	KOR	3.2 km	MPC · JPL
47725	2000 DW_{39}	—	February 29, 2000	Socorro	LINEAR	·	5.6 km	MPC · JPL
47726	2000 DE_{42}	—	February 29, 2000	Socorro	LINEAR	EOS	4.1 km	MPC · JPL
47727	2000 DG_{44}	—	February 29, 2000	Socorro	LINEAR	·	8.1 km	MPC · JPL
47728	2000 DP_{45}	—	February 29, 2000	Socorro	LINEAR	·	5.3 km	MPC · JPL
47729	2000 DR_{45}	—	February 29, 2000	Socorro	LINEAR	·	4.2 km	MPC · JPL
47730	2000 DY_{46}	—	February 29, 2000	Socorro	LINEAR	·	4.2 km	MPC · JPL
47731	2000 DM_{48}	—	February 29, 2000	Socorro	LINEAR	THM	6.0 km	MPC · JPL
47732	2000 DR_{51}	—	February 29, 2000	Socorro	LINEAR	THM	6.3 km	MPC · JPL
47733	2000 DW_{51}	—	February 29, 2000	Socorro	LINEAR	·	3.7 km	MPC · JPL
47734	2000 DX_{55}	—	February 29, 2000	Socorro	LINEAR	AGN	4.0 km	MPC · JPL
47735	2000 DS_{60}	—	February 29, 2000	Socorro	LINEAR	·	16 km	MPC · JPL
47736	2000 DG_{61}	—	February 29, 2000	Socorro	LINEAR	THM	7.4 km	MPC · JPL
47737	2000 DT_{66}	—	February 29, 2000	Socorro	LINEAR	·	4.6 km	MPC · JPL
47738	2000 DB_{68}	—	February 29, 2000	Socorro	LINEAR	HOF	7.0 km	MPC · JPL
47739	2000 DD_{69}	—	February 29, 2000	Socorro	LINEAR	·	3.6 km	MPC · JPL
47740	2000 DC_{71}	—	February 29, 2000	Socorro	LINEAR	·	10 km	MPC · JPL
47741	2000 DQ_{71}	—	February 29, 2000	Socorro	LINEAR	NAE	8.6 km	MPC · JPL
47742	2000 DX_{73}	—	February 29, 2000	Socorro	LINEAR	THM	7.7 km	MPC · JPL
47743	2000 DH_{74}	—	February 29, 2000	Socorro	LINEAR	·	6.7 km	MPC · JPL
47744	2000 DJ_{75}	—	February 29, 2000	Socorro	LINEAR	·	9.1 km	MPC · JPL
47745	2000 DE_{77}	—	February 29, 2000	Socorro	LINEAR	THM	9.1 km	MPC · JPL
47746	2000 DY_{77}	—	February 29, 2000	Socorro	LINEAR	·	4.9 km	MPC · JPL
47747	2000 DH_{81}	—	February 28, 2000	Socorro	LINEAR	·	6.4 km	MPC · JPL
47748	2000 DF_{82}	—	February 28, 2000	Socorro	LINEAR	·	6.7 km	MPC · JPL
47749	2000 DX_{82}	—	February 28, 2000	Socorro	LINEAR	·	7.5 km	MPC · JPL
47750	2000 DM_{85}	—	February 29, 2000	Socorro	LINEAR	·	6.8 km	MPC · JPL
47751	2000 DO_{85}	—	February 29, 2000	Socorro	LINEAR	·	2.9 km	MPC · JPL
47752	2000 DD_{87}	—	February 29, 2000	Socorro	LINEAR	·	8.9 km	MPC · JPL
47753	2000 DY_{92}	—	February 28, 2000	Socorro	LINEAR	·	4.8 km	MPC · JPL
47754	2000 DE_{94}	—	February 28, 2000	Socorro	LINEAR	·	5.1 km	MPC · JPL
47755	2000 DL_{94}	—	February 28, 2000	Socorro	LINEAR	·	3.6 km	MPC · JPL
47756	2000 DO_{96}	—	February 29, 2000	Socorro	LINEAR	·	4.1 km	MPC · JPL
47757	2000 DD_{98}	—	February 29, 2000	Socorro	LINEAR	·	2.4 km	MPC · JPL
47758	2000 DV_{98}	—	February 29, 2000	Socorro	LINEAR	EOS	4.3 km	MPC · JPL
47759	2000 DR_{99}	—	February 29, 2000	Socorro	LINEAR	·	3.0 km	MPC · JPL
47760	2000 DQ_{100}	—	February 29, 2000	Socorro	LINEAR	·	8.4 km	MPC · JPL
47761	2000 DR_{100}	—	February 29, 2000	Socorro	LINEAR	EMA · slow	11 km	MPC · JPL
47762	2000 DT_{100}	—	February 29, 2000	Socorro	LINEAR	·	4.5 km	MPC · JPL
47763	2000 DR_{101}	—	February 29, 2000	Socorro	LINEAR	EUN	3.9 km	MPC · JPL
47764	2000 DX_{102}	—	February 29, 2000	Socorro	LINEAR	EOS	4.6 km	MPC · JPL
47765	2000 DZ_{102}	—	February 29, 2000	Socorro	LINEAR	EOS	6.4 km	MPC · JPL
47766	2000 DP_{103}	—	February 29, 2000	Socorro	LINEAR	EUN	5.5 km	MPC · JPL
47767	2000 DR_{103}	—	February 29, 2000	Socorro	LINEAR	·	6.6 km	MPC · JPL
47768	2000 DD_{104}	—	February 29, 2000	Socorro	LINEAR	·	5.9 km	MPC · JPL
47769	2000 DK_{104}	—	February 29, 2000	Socorro	LINEAR	·	10 km	MPC · JPL
47770	2000 DN_{104}	—	February 29, 2000	Socorro	LINEAR	·	5.5 km	MPC · JPL
47771	2000 DC_{105}	—	February 29, 2000	Socorro	LINEAR	(31811)	6.8 km	MPC · JPL
47772	2000 DO_{107}	—	February 29, 2000	Socorro	LINEAR	KOR	3.8 km	MPC · JPL
47773	2000 DV_{108}	—	February 29, 2000	Socorro	LINEAR	EOS	5.9 km	MPC · JPL
47774	2000 DC_{110}	—	February 29, 2000	Socorro	LINEAR	·	5.4 km	MPC · JPL
47775 Johnanderson	2000 DX_{115}	Johnanderson	February 27, 2000	Catalina	CSS	BRA	5.4 km	MPC · JPL
47776	2000 EX	—	March 3, 2000	Višnjan Observatory	K. Korlević	GEF	4.4 km	MPC · JPL
47777	2000 EK_{9}	—	March 3, 2000	Socorro	LINEAR	THM	8.9 km	MPC · JPL
47778	2000 EX_{10}	—	March 4, 2000	Socorro	LINEAR	·	5.2 km	MPC · JPL
47779	2000 EE_{11}	—	March 4, 2000	Socorro	LINEAR	EOS	5.5 km	MPC · JPL
47780	2000 EM_{13}	—	March 5, 2000	Socorro	LINEAR	·	4.2 km	MPC · JPL
47781	2000 EK_{17}	—	March 3, 2000	Socorro	LINEAR	·	7.9 km	MPC · JPL
47782	2000 EL_{18}	—	March 5, 2000	Socorro	LINEAR	KOR	3.3 km	MPC · JPL
47783	2000 EU_{19}	—	March 5, 2000	Socorro	LINEAR	GEF	4.4 km	MPC · JPL
47784	2000 EY_{19}	—	March 7, 2000	Socorro	LINEAR	·	12 km	MPC · JPL
47785 Jonathanward	2000 EL_{20}	Jonathanward	March 3, 2000	Catalina	CSS	·	5.3 km	MPC · JPL
47786 Michaelleinbach	2000 EQ_{20}	Michaelleinbach	March 3, 2000	Catalina	CSS	·	18 km	MPC · JPL
47787	2000 EW_{24}	—	March 8, 2000	Kitt Peak	Spacewatch	·	10 km	MPC · JPL
47788	2000 EB_{26}	—	March 8, 2000	Kitt Peak	Spacewatch	·	7.4 km	MPC · JPL
47789	2000 ED_{26}	—	March 8, 2000	Kitt Peak	Spacewatch	·	3.5 km	MPC · JPL
47790	2000 EJ_{30}	—	March 5, 2000	Socorro	LINEAR	EOS	5.1 km	MPC · JPL
47791	2000 EC_{31}	—	March 5, 2000	Socorro	LINEAR	EMA	11 km	MPC · JPL
47792	2000 EV_{31}	—	March 5, 2000	Socorro	LINEAR	·	4.3 km	MPC · JPL
47793	2000 EO_{32}	—	March 5, 2000	Socorro	LINEAR	(5)	3.0 km	MPC · JPL
47794	2000 EP_{38}	—	March 8, 2000	Socorro	LINEAR	·	3.9 km	MPC · JPL
47795	2000 ER_{38}	—	March 8, 2000	Socorro	LINEAR	·	8.5 km	MPC · JPL
47796	2000 EN_{40}	—	March 8, 2000	Socorro	LINEAR	·	10 km	MPC · JPL
47797	2000 EQ_{40}	—	March 8, 2000	Socorro	LINEAR	EOS	7.3 km	MPC · JPL
47798	2000 EP_{45}	—	March 9, 2000	Socorro	LINEAR	EOS	7.7 km	MPC · JPL
47799	2000 ES_{49}	—	March 9, 2000	Socorro	LINEAR	EUN	4.1 km	MPC · JPL
47800	2000 ED_{50}	—	March 7, 2000	Višnjan Observatory	K. Korlević	EOS	6.3 km	MPC · JPL

== 47801–47900 ==
back to top

Designation			Discovery			Properties		Ref
Permanent	Provisional	Named after	Date	Site	Discoverer(s)	Category	Diam.	Ref
47801	2000 EF_{55}	—	March 10, 2000	Kitt Peak	Spacewatch	·	13 km	MPC · JPL
47802	2000 EZ_{56}	—	March 8, 2000	Socorro	LINEAR	·	6.4 km	MPC · JPL
47803	2000 EK_{58}	—	March 8, 2000	Socorro	LINEAR	·	5.2 km	MPC · JPL
47804	2000 EP_{59}	—	March 10, 2000	Socorro	LINEAR	MIS	5.9 km	MPC · JPL
47805	2000 EY_{60}	—	March 10, 2000	Socorro	LINEAR	·	6.8 km	MPC · JPL
47806	2000 EV_{65}	—	March 10, 2000	Socorro	LINEAR	·	7.8 km	MPC · JPL
47807	2000 ED_{67}	—	March 10, 2000	Socorro	LINEAR	EOS	5.4 km	MPC · JPL
47808	2000 EG_{67}	—	March 10, 2000	Socorro	LINEAR	·	7.0 km	MPC · JPL
47809	2000 EA_{78}	—	March 5, 2000	Socorro	LINEAR	NYS	2.8 km	MPC · JPL
47810	2000 EE_{79}	—	March 5, 2000	Socorro	LINEAR	·	2.7 km	MPC · JPL
47811	2000 ER_{79}	—	March 5, 2000	Socorro	LINEAR	HYG	8.2 km	MPC · JPL
47812	2000 EW_{79}	—	March 5, 2000	Socorro	LINEAR	·	11 km	MPC · JPL
47813	2000 EK_{84}	—	March 6, 2000	Socorro	LINEAR	·	5.1 km	MPC · JPL
47814	2000 ED_{85}	—	March 8, 2000	Socorro	LINEAR	·	9.5 km	MPC · JPL
47815	2000 EP_{85}	—	March 8, 2000	Socorro	LINEAR	EOS	5.1 km	MPC · JPL
47816	2000 EE_{86}	—	March 8, 2000	Socorro	LINEAR	GEF	4.0 km	MPC · JPL
47817	2000 EW_{89}	—	March 9, 2000	Socorro	LINEAR	·	3.0 km	MPC · JPL
47818	2000 EA_{91}	—	March 9, 2000	Socorro	LINEAR	GEF	5.6 km	MPC · JPL
47819	2000 EJ_{91}	—	March 9, 2000	Socorro	LINEAR	·	6.4 km	MPC · JPL
47820	2000 EB_{93}	—	March 9, 2000	Socorro	LINEAR	EOS	5.5 km	MPC · JPL
47821	2000 EN_{93}	—	March 9, 2000	Socorro	LINEAR	·	4.2 km	MPC · JPL
47822	2000 EX_{95}	—	March 11, 2000	Socorro	LINEAR	·	8.2 km	MPC · JPL
47823	2000 EK_{97}	—	March 10, 2000	Socorro	LINEAR	·	10 km	MPC · JPL
47824	2000 ED_{103}	—	March 11, 2000	Socorro	LINEAR	·	6.6 km	MPC · JPL
47825	2000 EO_{103}	—	March 12, 2000	Socorro	LINEAR	EOS	5.9 km	MPC · JPL
47826	2000 EC_{105}	—	March 11, 2000	Anderson Mesa	LONEOS	·	7.7 km	MPC · JPL
47827	2000 EJ_{105}	—	March 11, 2000	Anderson Mesa	LONEOS	·	12 km	MPC · JPL
47828	2000 EV_{109}	—	March 8, 2000	Kitt Peak	Spacewatch	CYB	14 km	MPC · JPL
47829	2000 EF_{110}	—	March 8, 2000	Haleakala	NEAT	MAR	5.5 km	MPC · JPL
47830	2000 EF_{111}	—	March 8, 2000	Haleakala	NEAT	·	9.3 km	MPC · JPL
47831	2000 ED_{112}	—	March 9, 2000	Socorro	LINEAR	·	5.1 km	MPC · JPL
47832	2000 EC_{113}	—	March 9, 2000	Socorro	LINEAR	·	14 km	MPC · JPL
47833	2000 EJ_{114}	—	March 9, 2000	Socorro	LINEAR	KOR	4.5 km	MPC · JPL
47834	2000 EN_{114}	—	March 9, 2000	Socorro	LINEAR	·	4.4 km	MPC · JPL
47835 Stevecoe	2000 EK_{116}	Stevecoe	March 10, 2000	Catalina	CSS	EUN	4.9 km	MPC · JPL
47836	2000 EU_{116}	—	March 10, 2000	Socorro	LINEAR	VER	8.7 km	MPC · JPL
47837	2000 EB_{118}	—	March 11, 2000	Anderson Mesa	LONEOS	EOS	5.8 km	MPC · JPL
47838	2000 EP_{119}	—	March 11, 2000	Anderson Mesa	LONEOS	·	11 km	MPC · JPL
47839	2000 ES_{119}	—	March 11, 2000	Anderson Mesa	LONEOS	EOS	6.8 km	MPC · JPL
47840	2000 EW_{119}	—	March 11, 2000	Anderson Mesa	LONEOS	EOS	4.5 km	MPC · JPL
47841	2000 EO_{121}	—	March 11, 2000	Anderson Mesa	LONEOS	·	4.7 km	MPC · JPL
47842	2000 EH_{122}	—	March 11, 2000	Anderson Mesa	LONEOS	·	7.3 km	MPC · JPL
47843 Maxson	2000 EC_{123}	Maxson	March 11, 2000	Catalina	CSS	EOS	12 km	MPC · JPL
47844	2000 EQ_{126}	—	March 11, 2000	Anderson Mesa	LONEOS	EOS	6.6 km	MPC · JPL
47845	2000 ED_{129}	—	March 11, 2000	Anderson Mesa	LONEOS	EOS	5.3 km	MPC · JPL
47846	2000 EM_{133}	—	March 11, 2000	Socorro	LINEAR	KOR	3.9 km	MPC · JPL
47847	2000 EV_{133}	—	March 11, 2000	Anderson Mesa	LONEOS	EOS	5.8 km	MPC · JPL
47848	2000 EY_{133}	—	March 11, 2000	Socorro	LINEAR	EOS	5.3 km	MPC · JPL
47849	2000 EY_{135}	—	March 11, 2000	Anderson Mesa	LONEOS	slow	6.7 km	MPC · JPL
47850	2000 EB_{137}	—	March 12, 2000	Socorro	LINEAR	EOS	9.4 km	MPC · JPL
47851 Budine	2000 EW_{139}	Budine	March 12, 2000	Catalina	CSS	TEL	4.3 km	MPC · JPL
47852 Frankydubois	2000 EQ_{140}	Frankydubois	March 2, 2000	Catalina	CSS	·	4.6 km	MPC · JPL
47853	2000 EA_{144}	—	March 3, 2000	Catalina	CSS	EUN	5.6 km	MPC · JPL
47854	2000 EY_{150}	—	March 5, 2000	Haleakala	NEAT	GEF	3.5 km	MPC · JPL
47855	2000 EU_{153}	—	March 6, 2000	Haleakala	NEAT	·	4.2 km	MPC · JPL
47856	2000 EO_{154}	—	March 6, 2000	Haleakala	NEAT	·	4.9 km	MPC · JPL
47857	2000 ET_{155}	—	March 9, 2000	Socorro	LINEAR	·	6.8 km	MPC · JPL
47858	2000 EB_{158}	—	March 12, 2000	Anderson Mesa	LONEOS	EOS	8.4 km	MPC · JPL
47859	2000 EJ_{158}	—	March 12, 2000	Anderson Mesa	LONEOS	EUN	4.2 km	MPC · JPL
47860	2000 EX_{163}	—	March 3, 2000	Socorro	LINEAR	MRX	3.8 km	MPC · JPL
47861	2000 EY_{169}	—	March 5, 2000	Socorro	LINEAR	·	7.9 km	MPC · JPL
47862 Nancyramos	2000 ED_{175}	Nancyramos	March 2, 2000	Catalina	CSS	·	6.3 km	MPC · JPL
47863	2000 EC_{180}	—	March 4, 2000	Socorro	LINEAR	·	7.3 km	MPC · JPL
47864	2000 EN_{184}	—	March 5, 2000	Socorro	LINEAR	EOS	5.1 km	MPC · JPL
47865	2000 FK_{3}	—	March 28, 2000	Socorro	LINEAR	EOS	7.2 km	MPC · JPL
47866	2000 FM_{5}	—	March 25, 2000	Kitt Peak	Spacewatch	KOR	2.7 km	MPC · JPL
47867	2000 FC_{6}	—	March 25, 2000	Kitt Peak	Spacewatch	THM	6.8 km	MPC · JPL
47868	2000 FS_{11}	—	March 28, 2000	Socorro	LINEAR	·	5.5 km	MPC · JPL
47869	2000 FF_{12}	—	March 28, 2000	Socorro	LINEAR	HNS	4.8 km	MPC · JPL
47870	2000 FK_{13}	—	March 29, 2000	Socorro	LINEAR	(1118)	18 km	MPC · JPL
47871	2000 FQ_{13}	—	March 29, 2000	Socorro	LINEAR	EUN	3.6 km	MPC · JPL
47872	2000 FV_{15}	—	March 28, 2000	Socorro	LINEAR	DOR	7.4 km	MPC · JPL
47873	2000 FV_{16}	—	March 28, 2000	Socorro	LINEAR	VER	7.9 km	MPC · JPL
47874	2000 FP_{17}	—	March 29, 2000	Socorro	LINEAR	EOS	7.0 km	MPC · JPL
47875	2000 FG_{21}	—	March 29, 2000	Socorro	LINEAR	GEF	4.5 km	MPC · JPL
47876	2000 FM_{21}	—	March 29, 2000	Socorro	LINEAR	GEF	3.6 km	MPC · JPL
47877	2000 FE_{23}	—	March 29, 2000	Socorro	LINEAR	EOS	8.0 km	MPC · JPL
47878	2000 FK_{25}	—	March 26, 2000	Anderson Mesa	LONEOS	VER	9.2 km	MPC · JPL
47879	2000 FR_{26}	—	March 27, 2000	Anderson Mesa	LONEOS	EOS	5.6 km	MPC · JPL
47880	2000 FY_{27}	—	March 27, 2000	Anderson Mesa	LONEOS	·	6.9 km	MPC · JPL
47881	2000 FV_{30}	—	March 27, 2000	Anderson Mesa	LONEOS	·	4.4 km	MPC · JPL
47882	2000 FT_{38}	—	March 29, 2000	Socorro	LINEAR	·	9.0 km	MPC · JPL
47883	2000 FZ_{39}	—	March 29, 2000	Socorro	LINEAR	·	5.5 km	MPC · JPL
47884	2000 FN_{40}	—	March 29, 2000	Socorro	LINEAR	GEF	3.3 km	MPC · JPL
47885	2000 FB_{42}	—	March 29, 2000	Socorro	LINEAR	·	7.5 km	MPC · JPL
47886	2000 FT_{42}	—	March 28, 2000	Socorro	LINEAR	·	4.5 km	MPC · JPL
47887	2000 FY_{42}	—	March 28, 2000	Socorro	LINEAR	·	4.1 km	MPC · JPL
47888	2000 FC_{46}	—	March 29, 2000	Socorro	LINEAR	·	10 km	MPC · JPL
47889	2000 FL_{47}	—	March 29, 2000	Socorro	LINEAR	·	10 km	MPC · JPL
47890	2000 FB_{49}	—	March 30, 2000	Socorro	LINEAR	URS	13 km	MPC · JPL
47891 García-Migani	2000 FO_{65}	García-Migani	March 27, 2000	Anderson Mesa	LONEOS	THM	6.0 km	MPC · JPL
47892	2000 GT_{5}	—	April 4, 2000	Socorro	LINEAR	HYG	7.2 km	MPC · JPL
47893	2000 GY_{11}	—	April 5, 2000	Socorro	LINEAR	EOS	6.3 km	MPC · JPL
47894	2000 GS_{21}	—	April 5, 2000	Socorro	LINEAR	·	4.3 km	MPC · JPL
47895	2000 GZ_{25}	—	April 5, 2000	Socorro	LINEAR	·	2.4 km	MPC · JPL
47896	2000 GE_{36}	—	April 5, 2000	Socorro	LINEAR	·	9.0 km	MPC · JPL
47897	2000 GO_{38}	—	April 5, 2000	Socorro	LINEAR	·	5.4 km	MPC · JPL
47898	2000 GA_{47}	—	April 5, 2000	Socorro	LINEAR	·	8.1 km	MPC · JPL
47899	2000 GO_{48}	—	April 5, 2000	Socorro	LINEAR	·	6.6 km	MPC · JPL
47900	2000 GS_{48}	—	April 5, 2000	Socorro	LINEAR	·	4.5 km	MPC · JPL

== 47901–48000 ==
back to top

Designation			Discovery			Properties		Ref
Permanent	Provisional	Named after	Date	Site	Discoverer(s)	Category	Diam.	Ref
47901	2000 GH_{54}	—	April 5, 2000	Socorro	LINEAR	URS	9.5 km	MPC · JPL
47902	2000 GM_{55}	—	April 5, 2000	Socorro	LINEAR	·	7.9 km	MPC · JPL
47903	2000 GX_{55}	—	April 5, 2000	Socorro	LINEAR	(1298)	10 km	MPC · JPL
47904	2000 GW_{56}	—	April 5, 2000	Socorro	LINEAR	THM	7.2 km	MPC · JPL
47905	2000 GN_{63}	—	April 5, 2000	Socorro	LINEAR	THM	8.1 km	MPC · JPL
47906	2000 GV_{67}	—	April 5, 2000	Socorro	LINEAR	·	6.0 km	MPC · JPL
47907	2000 GT_{71}	—	April 5, 2000	Socorro	LINEAR	T_{j} (2.98) · 3:2	15 km	MPC · JPL
47908	2000 GH_{72}	—	April 5, 2000	Socorro	LINEAR	·	4.3 km	MPC · JPL
47909	2000 GC_{74}	—	April 5, 2000	Socorro	LINEAR	·	6.6 km	MPC · JPL
47910	2000 GY_{74}	—	April 5, 2000	Socorro	LINEAR	·	7.9 km	MPC · JPL
47911	2000 GT_{76}	—	April 5, 2000	Socorro	LINEAR	EOS	6.7 km	MPC · JPL
47912	2000 GA_{81}	—	April 6, 2000	Socorro	LINEAR	·	6.2 km	MPC · JPL
47913	2000 GR_{81}	—	April 6, 2000	Socorro	LINEAR	·	6.6 km	MPC · JPL
47914	2000 GM_{90}	—	April 4, 2000	Socorro	LINEAR	·	6.9 km	MPC · JPL
47915	2000 GG_{91}	—	April 4, 2000	Socorro	LINEAR	·	4.9 km	MPC · JPL
47916	2000 GA_{98}	—	April 7, 2000	Socorro	LINEAR	·	6.6 km	MPC · JPL
47917	2000 GO_{100}	—	April 7, 2000	Socorro	LINEAR	EUN	5.3 km	MPC · JPL
47918	2000 GN_{101}	—	April 7, 2000	Socorro	LINEAR	·	6.8 km	MPC · JPL
47919	2000 GS_{101}	—	April 7, 2000	Socorro	LINEAR	·	5.9 km	MPC · JPL
47920	2000 GZ_{104}	—	April 7, 2000	Socorro	LINEAR	THM	11 km	MPC · JPL
47921	2000 GW_{106}	—	April 7, 2000	Socorro	LINEAR	GEF	4.5 km	MPC · JPL
47922	2000 GK_{109}	—	April 7, 2000	Socorro	LINEAR	EOS	6.9 km	MPC · JPL
47923	2000 GJ_{111}	—	April 3, 2000	Anderson Mesa	LONEOS	·	10 km	MPC · JPL
47924	2000 GS_{113}	—	April 7, 2000	Socorro	LINEAR	·	6.0 km	MPC · JPL
47925	2000 GC_{118}	—	April 2, 2000	Kitt Peak	Spacewatch	·	2.8 km	MPC · JPL
47926	2000 GK_{135}	—	April 8, 2000	Socorro	LINEAR	EUN	4.4 km	MPC · JPL
47927	2000 GG_{148}	—	April 5, 2000	Socorro	LINEAR	THM	6.2 km	MPC · JPL
47928	2000 GD_{154}	—	April 6, 2000	Anderson Mesa	LONEOS	·	10 km	MPC · JPL
47929	2000 GZ_{156}	—	April 6, 2000	Socorro	LINEAR	GEF	4.4 km	MPC · JPL
47930	2000 GK_{159}	—	April 7, 2000	Socorro	LINEAR	·	12 km	MPC · JPL
47931 Stifler	2000 GG_{167}	Stifler	April 4, 2000	Anderson Mesa	LONEOS	·	7.7 km	MPC · JPL
47932	2000 GN_{171}	—	April 1, 2000	Steward Observatory	Gleason, A.	plutino	147 km	MPC · JPL
47933	2000 HS_{7}	—	April 27, 2000	Socorro	LINEAR	·	6.9 km	MPC · JPL
47934	2000 HU_{7}	—	April 27, 2000	Socorro	LINEAR	·	10 km	MPC · JPL
47935	2000 HR_{11}	—	April 28, 2000	Socorro	LINEAR	·	3.6 km	MPC · JPL
47936	2000 HS_{29}	—	April 28, 2000	Socorro	LINEAR	·	6.8 km	MPC · JPL
47937	2000 HB_{44}	—	April 25, 2000	Anderson Mesa	LONEOS	·	6.3 km	MPC · JPL
47938	2000 HL_{45}	—	April 26, 2000	Anderson Mesa	LONEOS	KOR	4.3 km	MPC · JPL
47939	2000 HO_{58}	—	April 25, 2000	Kitt Peak	Spacewatch	·	7.5 km	MPC · JPL
47940	2000 HE_{59}	—	April 25, 2000	Anderson Mesa	LONEOS	URS	14 km	MPC · JPL
47941	2000 HU_{61}	—	April 25, 2000	Anderson Mesa	LONEOS	3:2	12 km	MPC · JPL
47942	2000 HW_{76}	—	April 27, 2000	Socorro	LINEAR	·	11 km	MPC · JPL
47943	2000 HS_{77}	—	April 28, 2000	Socorro	LINEAR	·	6.3 km	MPC · JPL
47944	2000 JK_{12}	—	May 5, 2000	Socorro	LINEAR	THM	9.7 km	MPC · JPL
47945	2000 JY_{18}	—	May 3, 2000	Socorro	LINEAR	·	11 km	MPC · JPL
47946	2000 JB_{52}	—	May 9, 2000	Socorro	LINEAR	·	18 km	MPC · JPL
47947	2000 JT_{72}	—	May 2, 2000	Anderson Mesa	LONEOS	HNS	4.2 km	MPC · JPL
47948	2000 KD_{32}	—	May 28, 2000	Socorro	LINEAR	·	11 km	MPC · JPL
47949	2000 KW_{34}	—	May 27, 2000	Socorro	LINEAR	HYG	8.0 km	MPC · JPL
47950	2000 MP	—	June 24, 2000	Kitt Peak	Spacewatch	(5)	3.0 km	MPC · JPL
47951	2000 OS_{15}	—	July 23, 2000	Socorro	LINEAR	·	8.6 km	MPC · JPL
47952	2000 OM_{16}	—	July 23, 2000	Socorro	LINEAR	NYS	5.3 km	MPC · JPL
47953	2000 QJ_{27}	—	August 24, 2000	Socorro	LINEAR	·	2.8 km	MPC · JPL
47954	2000 QF_{40}	—	August 24, 2000	Socorro	LINEAR	·	2.5 km	MPC · JPL
47955	2000 QZ_{73}	—	August 24, 2000	Socorro	LINEAR	L5	21 km	MPC · JPL
47956	2000 QS_{103}	—	August 28, 2000	Socorro	LINEAR	L5	19 km	MPC · JPL
47957	2000 QN_{116}	—	August 28, 2000	Socorro	LINEAR	L5	27 km	MPC · JPL
47958	2000 QV_{142}	—	August 31, 2000	Socorro	LINEAR	V	1.7 km	MPC · JPL
47959	2000 QP_{168}	—	August 31, 2000	Socorro	LINEAR	L5	13 km	MPC · JPL
47960	2000 RS_{54}	—	September 3, 2000	Socorro	LINEAR	·	2.8 km	MPC · JPL
47961	2000 RR_{69}	—	September 2, 2000	Socorro	LINEAR	·	3.3 km	MPC · JPL
47962	2000 RU_{69}	—	September 2, 2000	Socorro	LINEAR	L5	24 km	MPC · JPL
47963	2000 SO_{56}	—	September 24, 2000	Socorro	LINEAR	L5	27 km	MPC · JPL
47964	2000 SG_{131}	—	September 22, 2000	Socorro	LINEAR	L5	17 km	MPC · JPL
47965	2000 SP_{148}	—	September 24, 2000	Socorro	LINEAR	NYS	3.5 km	MPC · JPL
47966	2000 SE_{261}	—	September 24, 2000	Socorro	LINEAR	H	1.1 km	MPC · JPL
47967	2000 SL_{298}	—	September 28, 2000	Socorro	LINEAR	L5	21 km	MPC · JPL
47968	2000 TZ_{55}	—	October 1, 2000	Anderson Mesa	LONEOS	H	1.6 km	MPC · JPL
47969	2000 TG_{64}	—	October 5, 2000	Socorro	LINEAR	L5	23 km	MPC · JPL
47970	2000 UR_{62}	—	October 25, 2000	Socorro	LINEAR	·	3.1 km	MPC · JPL
47971	2000 VO_{4}	—	November 1, 2000	Socorro	LINEAR	·	5.7 km	MPC · JPL
47972	2000 VW_{15}	—	November 1, 2000	Socorro	LINEAR	ANF	4.6 km	MPC · JPL
47973	2000 VL_{46}	—	November 3, 2000	Socorro	LINEAR	·	2.5 km	MPC · JPL
47974	2000 WN_{23}	—	November 20, 2000	Socorro	LINEAR	·	2.9 km	MPC · JPL
47975	2000 WE_{26}	—	November 21, 2000	Socorro	LINEAR	(2076) · slow	2.0 km	MPC · JPL
47976	2000 WU_{88}	—	November 20, 2000	Socorro	LINEAR	slow	2.0 km	MPC · JPL
47977	2000 WC_{154}	—	November 30, 2000	Socorro	LINEAR	EOS	4.1 km	MPC · JPL
47978	2000 WJ_{166}	—	November 24, 2000	Anderson Mesa	LONEOS	·	6.5 km	MPC · JPL
47979	2000 WD_{179}	—	November 25, 2000	Socorro	LINEAR	·	9.2 km	MPC · JPL
47980	2000 WM_{179}	—	November 26, 2000	Socorro	LINEAR	·	3.8 km	MPC · JPL
47981	2000 WG_{183}	—	November 30, 2000	Gnosca	S. Sposetti	KOR	3.4 km	MPC · JPL
47982	2000 WQ_{187}	—	November 16, 2000	Anderson Mesa	LONEOS	·	7.8 km	MPC · JPL
47983	2000 XX_{13}	—	December 4, 2000	Socorro	LINEAR	H	2.0 km	MPC · JPL
47984	2000 XE_{20}	—	December 4, 2000	Socorro	LINEAR	·	2.1 km	MPC · JPL
47985	2000 XV_{41}	—	December 5, 2000	Socorro	LINEAR	BAR · slow	3.7 km	MPC · JPL
47986	2000 YN_{3}	—	December 18, 2000	Kitt Peak	Spacewatch	·	2.0 km	MPC · JPL
47987	2000 YY_{8}	—	December 20, 2000	Kitt Peak	Spacewatch	·	2.9 km	MPC · JPL
47988	2000 YV_{25}	—	December 22, 2000	Socorro	LINEAR	·	4.2 km	MPC · JPL
47989	2000 YD_{35}	—	December 28, 2000	Socorro	LINEAR	·	2.2 km	MPC · JPL
47990	2000 YV_{68}	—	December 28, 2000	Socorro	LINEAR	·	1.5 km	MPC · JPL
47991	2000 YK_{73}	—	December 30, 2000	Socorro	LINEAR	AGN	2.7 km	MPC · JPL
47992	2000 YY_{103}	—	December 28, 2000	Socorro	LINEAR	NYS	3.2 km	MPC · JPL
47993	2000 YM_{105}	—	December 28, 2000	Socorro	LINEAR	·	2.9 km	MPC · JPL
47994	2000 YN_{118}	—	December 30, 2000	Socorro	LINEAR	·	3.3 km	MPC · JPL
47995	2000 YE_{133}	—	December 30, 2000	Anderson Mesa	LONEOS	EOS	7.7 km	MPC · JPL
47996	2000 YY_{139}	—	December 31, 2000	Anderson Mesa	LONEOS	PHO	2.9 km	MPC · JPL
47997	2001 AD_{20}	—	January 2, 2001	Socorro	LINEAR	·	2.7 km	MPC · JPL
47998	2001 AZ_{44}	—	January 15, 2001	Oizumi	T. Kobayashi	NYS	3.0 km	MPC · JPL
47999	2001 BC_{9}	—	January 19, 2001	Socorro	LINEAR	·	3.1 km	MPC · JPL
48000	2001 BX_{37}	—	January 21, 2001	Socorro	LINEAR	·	1.8 km	MPC · JPL

back to top

== See also ==
- Meanings of minor-planet names: 47001–48000
