= Dennis K. Chesney =

American astronomer

Dennis K. Chesney is an American astronomer and discoverer of minor planets born in Clovis, New Mexico, and credited by the Minor Planet Center with the discovery of 38 numbered minor planets during 1998–2000. As of 2016, his only named discovery is the outer main-belt asteroid 12583 Buckjean, which he named after his parents. It was they who had gavin him a pair of binoculars for Christmas, that ultimately led to his many asteroid discoveries. Naming citation was published on 20 March 2000 (M.P.C. 39658).

== List of discovered minor planets ==
12583 Buckjean	11 September 1999	list
(15064) 1999 AC_{4}	10 January 1999	list
(15074) 1999 BN_{14}	25 January 1999	list
(15471) 1999 BE_{5}	19 January 1999	list
(16030) 1999 FS_{3}	19 March 1999	list
(16993) 1999 CC_{10}	15 February 1999	list
(20761) 2000 EA_{8}	5 March 2000	list
(21809) 1999 TG_{19}	15 October 1999	list
(22895) 1999 TV_{5}	6 October 1999	list
(24096) 1999 VQ_{2}	5 November 1999	list
(24111) 1999 VY_{22}	13 November 1999	list
(25281) 1998 WP	16 November 1998	list
(28197) 1998 XZ_{12}	15 December 1998	list
(31422) 1999 BE_{1}	16 January 1999	list
(31448) 1999 CO_{8}	13 February 1999	list

(35688) 1999 CD_{10}	15 February 1999	list
(38573) 1999 WA_{1}	19 November 1999	list
(40741) 1999 TD	1 October 1999	list
(40747) 1999 TK_{5}	2 October 1999	list
(40992) 1999 UL_{1}	18 October 1999	list
(44714) 1999 TS_{5}	6 October 1999	list
(47055) 1998 XH_{5}	10 December 1998	list
(47135) 1999 EX_{2}	8 March 1999	list
(47136) 1999 EA_{3}	12 March 1999	list
(47593) 2000 AF_{204}	12 January 2000	list
(49484) 1999 BP_{15}	27 January 1999	list
(50864) 2000 GM_{2}	5 April 2000	list
(53315) 1999 JD_{3}	10 May 1999	list
(56328) 1999 WE	17 November 1999	list
(59213) 1999 BO_{14}	25 January 1999	list

(59999) 1999 TP_{3}	3 October 1999	list
(60002) 1999 TU_{5}	6 October 1999	list
(66845) 1999 VE_{2}	5 November 1999	list
(66853) 1999 VH_{12}	10 November 1999	list
(70436) 1999 TT_{5}	6 October 1999	list
(91894) 1999 VH_{5}	6 November 1999	list
(145880) 1999 TE	1 October 1999	list
(162722) 2000 VD	1 November 2000	list
