= Helmut Ullrich Astronomical Observatory =

- Observatory code: 154
- Location: Dolomites, Cortina d'Ampezzo, Italy
- Coordinates: 46.5425717°N 12.104334°E
- Altitude: 1,780 metres (5,840 ft)
- Weather: Clear ~175 nights per year
- Website: http://www.cortinastelle.it/

Telescopes
- Telescope 1: 40-cm Ritchey–Chrétien telescope
- Telescope 2: 28-cm Schmidt–Cassegrain

The Helmut Ullrich Astronomical Observatory is an observatory situated on Col Drusciè, a mountain peak in the Dolomites located within Cortina d'Ampezzo, Italy since 1972. The observatory sits at an elevation of 1,780 metres (5,840 ft) above sea level and includes two domes, with a 20" Newtonian telescope and an 11" Schmidt–Cassegrain telescope inside.

The observatory hosts a remote control system called "Sky on the Web", which allows users to control the operation of the observatory remotely, including telescope pointing, image taking and processing, image downloading on one's home PC, weather alerts. The amateur astronomers that manage the observatory are mainly involved in comet studies and galaxy observations, in order to search for supernovae. In the framework of CROSS (Col drusciè Remote Observatory Supernovae Search) program they have discovered so far 30 supernovae and one minor planet (50240 Cortina).

== See also ==
- List of astronomical observatories
