= List of minor planets: 51001–52000 =

The following is a partial list of minor planets, running from minor-planet number 51001 through 52000, inclusive. The primary data for this and other partial lists is based on JPL's "Small-Body Orbital Elements" and data available from the Minor Planet Center. Critical list information is also provided by the MPC, unless otherwise specified from Lowell Observatory. A detailed description of the table's columns and additional sources are given on the main page including a complete list of every page in this series, and a statistical break-up on the dynamical classification of minor planets.

Also see the summary list of all named bodies in numerical and alphabetical order, and the corresponding naming citations for the number range of this particular list. New namings may only be added to this list after official publication, as the preannouncement of names is condemned by the Working Group for Small Bodies Nomenclature of the International Astronomical Union.

Near-Earth obj.	MBA (inner)	MBA (outer)	Centaur
Mars-crosser	MBA (middle)	Jupiter trojan	Trans-Neptunian obj.
Unclassified

== 51001–51100 ==
Designation			Discovery			Properties		Ref
Permanent	Provisional	Named after	Date	Site	Discoverer(s)	Category	Diam.	Ref
51001	2000 GL_{98}	—	April 7, 2000	Socorro	LINEAR	PAD	6.3 km	MPC · JPL
51002	2000 GY_{99}	—	April 7, 2000	Socorro	LINEAR	·	5.5 km	MPC · JPL
51003	2000 GP_{100}	—	April 7, 2000	Socorro	LINEAR	·	2.5 km	MPC · JPL
51004	2000 GL_{102}	—	April 7, 2000	Socorro	LINEAR	TEL	4.2 km	MPC · JPL
51005	2000 GM_{102}	—	April 7, 2000	Socorro	LINEAR	PAD	5.3 km	MPC · JPL
51006	2000 GQ_{102}	—	April 7, 2000	Socorro	LINEAR	·	3.4 km	MPC · JPL
51007	2000 GZ_{102}	—	April 7, 2000	Socorro	LINEAR	·	8.3 km	MPC · JPL
51008	2000 GD_{103}	—	April 7, 2000	Socorro	LINEAR	KOR	4.4 km	MPC · JPL
51009	2000 GF_{103}	—	April 7, 2000	Socorro	LINEAR	·	8.4 km	MPC · JPL
51010	2000 GN_{103}	—	April 7, 2000	Socorro	LINEAR	NYS · slow	3.0 km	MPC · JPL
51011	2000 GQ_{103}	—	April 7, 2000	Socorro	LINEAR	slow	3.5 km	MPC · JPL
51012	2000 GV_{103}	—	April 7, 2000	Socorro	LINEAR	·	8.7 km	MPC · JPL
51013	2000 GX_{104}	—	April 7, 2000	Socorro	LINEAR	·	5.5 km	MPC · JPL
51014	2000 GS_{105}	—	April 7, 2000	Socorro	LINEAR	·	4.9 km	MPC · JPL
51015	2000 GZ_{105}	—	April 7, 2000	Socorro	LINEAR	·	4.0 km	MPC · JPL
51016	2000 GG_{106}	—	April 7, 2000	Socorro	LINEAR	URS	12 km	MPC · JPL
51017	2000 GA_{107}	—	April 7, 2000	Socorro	LINEAR	·	3.9 km	MPC · JPL
51018	2000 GM_{107}	—	April 7, 2000	Socorro	LINEAR	·	10 km	MPC · JPL
51019	2000 GT_{107}	—	April 7, 2000	Socorro	LINEAR	·	4.7 km	MPC · JPL
51020	2000 GU_{108}	—	April 7, 2000	Socorro	LINEAR	EUN	4.9 km	MPC · JPL
51021	2000 GZ_{108}	—	April 7, 2000	Socorro	LINEAR	NYS	3.1 km	MPC · JPL
51022	2000 GE_{109}	—	April 7, 2000	Socorro	LINEAR	(1298)	9.7 km	MPC · JPL
51023 Benavidezlozano	2000 GT_{109}	Benavidezlozano	April 2, 2000	Anderson Mesa	LONEOS	·	5.3 km	MPC · JPL
51024	2000 GV_{109}	—	April 2, 2000	Anderson Mesa	LONEOS	·	3.5 km	MPC · JPL
51025	2000 GP_{110}	—	April 2, 2000	Anderson Mesa	LONEOS	·	3.2 km	MPC · JPL
51026	2000 GL_{111}	—	April 3, 2000	Anderson Mesa	LONEOS	EOS	6.8 km	MPC · JPL
51027	2000 GG_{112}	—	April 3, 2000	Anderson Mesa	LONEOS	·	3.8 km	MPC · JPL
51028	2000 GT_{113}	—	April 7, 2000	Socorro	LINEAR	·	4.4 km	MPC · JPL
51029	2000 GJ_{114}	—	April 7, 2000	Socorro	LINEAR	·	11 km	MPC · JPL
51030	2000 GQ_{115}	—	April 8, 2000	Socorro	LINEAR	·	3.2 km	MPC · JPL
51031	2000 GB_{116}	—	April 8, 2000	Socorro	LINEAR	·	4.4 km	MPC · JPL
51032	2000 GE_{119}	—	April 3, 2000	Kitt Peak	Spacewatch	(12739)	3.8 km	MPC · JPL
51033	2000 GD_{122}	—	April 6, 2000	Kitt Peak	Spacewatch	DOR	10 km	MPC · JPL
51034	2000 GB_{124}	—	April 7, 2000	Socorro	LINEAR	HNS	4.1 km	MPC · JPL
51035	2000 GO_{124}	—	April 7, 2000	Socorro	LINEAR	·	4.2 km	MPC · JPL
51036	2000 GJ_{125}	—	April 7, 2000	Socorro	LINEAR	EOS	6.7 km	MPC · JPL
51037	2000 GX_{130}	—	April 6, 2000	Kitt Peak	Spacewatch	EOS	6.8 km	MPC · JPL
51038	2000 GS_{132}	—	April 8, 2000	Socorro	LINEAR	·	7.1 km	MPC · JPL
51039	2000 GC_{133}	—	April 12, 2000	Haleakala	NEAT	EOS	4.5 km	MPC · JPL
51040	2000 GC_{134}	—	April 7, 2000	Socorro	LINEAR	·	5.7 km	MPC · JPL
51041	2000 GD_{134}	—	April 7, 2000	Socorro	LINEAR	·	7.1 km	MPC · JPL
51042	2000 GJ_{134}	—	April 8, 2000	Socorro	LINEAR	·	2.6 km	MPC · JPL
51043	2000 GY_{134}	—	April 8, 2000	Socorro	LINEAR	·	8.6 km	MPC · JPL
51044	2000 GG_{135}	—	April 8, 2000	Socorro	LINEAR	MAR	3.4 km	MPC · JPL
51045	2000 GL_{135}	—	April 8, 2000	Socorro	LINEAR	·	3.6 km	MPC · JPL
51046	2000 GV_{136}	—	April 12, 2000	Socorro	LINEAR	·	5.7 km	MPC · JPL
51047	2000 GX_{136}	—	April 12, 2000	Socorro	LINEAR	·	3.5 km	MPC · JPL
51048	2000 GB_{137}	—	April 12, 2000	Socorro	LINEAR	·	10 km	MPC · JPL
51049	2000 GE_{137}	—	April 12, 2000	Socorro	LINEAR	·	5.1 km	MPC · JPL
51050	2000 GF_{137}	—	April 12, 2000	Socorro	LINEAR	·	6.9 km	MPC · JPL
51051	2000 GN_{137}	—	April 8, 2000	Socorro	LINEAR	·	8.4 km	MPC · JPL
51052	2000 GP_{137}	—	April 8, 2000	Socorro	LINEAR	TIR	4.5 km	MPC · JPL
51053	2000 GH_{138}	—	April 4, 2000	Anderson Mesa	LONEOS	ADE	5.5 km	MPC · JPL
51054	2000 GD_{139}	—	April 4, 2000	Anderson Mesa	LONEOS	·	4.6 km	MPC · JPL
51055	2000 GG_{140}	—	April 4, 2000	Anderson Mesa	LONEOS	·	3.9 km	MPC · JPL
51056	2000 GP_{140}	—	April 4, 2000	Anderson Mesa	LONEOS	·	8.0 km	MPC · JPL
51057	2000 GT_{140}	—	April 4, 2000	Anderson Mesa	LONEOS	·	5.6 km	MPC · JPL
51058	2000 GA_{142}	—	April 7, 2000	Anderson Mesa	LONEOS	LUT	12 km	MPC · JPL
51059	2000 GR_{142}	—	April 7, 2000	Anderson Mesa	LONEOS	EOS	6.6 km	MPC · JPL
51060	2000 GT_{142}	—	April 7, 2000	Anderson Mesa	LONEOS	·	3.2 km	MPC · JPL
51061	2000 GW_{142}	—	April 7, 2000	Anderson Mesa	LONEOS	·	9.9 km	MPC · JPL
51062	2000 GE_{143}	—	April 7, 2000	Anderson Mesa	LONEOS	EOS	5.4 km	MPC · JPL
51063	2000 GO_{143}	—	April 7, 2000	Anderson Mesa	LONEOS	EOS	5.3 km	MPC · JPL
51064	2000 GY_{143}	—	April 11, 2000	Reedy Creek	J. Broughton	(5)	3.5 km	MPC · JPL
51065	2000 GC_{149}	—	April 5, 2000	Socorro	LINEAR	·	4.6 km	MPC · JPL
51066	2000 GP_{152}	—	April 6, 2000	Anderson Mesa	LONEOS	·	3.1 km	MPC · JPL
51067	2000 GP_{153}	—	April 6, 2000	Anderson Mesa	LONEOS	fast	2.0 km	MPC · JPL
51068	2000 GW_{156}	—	April 6, 2000	Socorro	LINEAR	KOR	3.5 km	MPC · JPL
51069	2000 GV_{157}	—	April 7, 2000	Socorro	LINEAR	·	5.4 km	MPC · JPL
51070	2000 GO_{158}	—	April 7, 2000	Anderson Mesa	LONEOS	CYB	8.2 km	MPC · JPL
51071	2000 GJ_{159}	—	April 7, 2000	Socorro	LINEAR	·	10 km	MPC · JPL
51072	2000 GX_{159}	—	April 7, 2000	Socorro	LINEAR	VER	9.0 km	MPC · JPL
51073	2000 GQ_{160}	—	April 7, 2000	Socorro	LINEAR	·	5.0 km	MPC · JPL
51074	2000 GT_{161}	—	April 7, 2000	Anderson Mesa	LONEOS	·	5.1 km	MPC · JPL
51075	2000 GG_{162}	—	April 7, 2000	Socorro	LINEAR	fast	1.8 km	MPC · JPL
51076	2000 GV_{162}	—	April 8, 2000	Socorro	LINEAR	·	3.4 km	MPC · JPL
51077	2000 GT_{163}	—	April 11, 2000	Haleakala	NEAT	fast	3.0 km	MPC · JPL
51078	2000 GZ_{163}	—	April 12, 2000	Socorro	LINEAR	·	8.7 km	MPC · JPL
51079	2000 GG_{166}	—	April 5, 2000	Socorro	LINEAR	·	4.9 km	MPC · JPL
51080	2000 GJ_{167}	—	April 4, 2000	Anderson Mesa	LONEOS	·	2.2 km	MPC · JPL
51081	2000 GB_{168}	—	April 4, 2000	Anderson Mesa	LONEOS	EOS	6.3 km	MPC · JPL
51082	2000 GZ_{169}	—	April 4, 2000	Anderson Mesa	LONEOS	·	4.8 km	MPC · JPL
51083	2000 GG_{170}	—	April 5, 2000	Anderson Mesa	LONEOS	·	4.4 km	MPC · JPL
51084	2000 GM_{171}	—	April 5, 2000	Anderson Mesa	LONEOS	·	6.8 km	MPC · JPL
51085	2000 GU_{172}	—	April 2, 2000	Anderson Mesa	LONEOS	·	6.3 km	MPC · JPL
51086	2000 GX_{172}	—	April 2, 2000	Socorro	LINEAR	·	11 km	MPC · JPL
51087	2000 GB_{177}	—	April 3, 2000	Kitt Peak	Spacewatch	AGN	3.4 km	MPC · JPL
51088	2000 GE_{177}	—	April 3, 2000	Kitt Peak	Spacewatch	·	2.2 km	MPC · JPL
51089	2000 GO_{178}	—	April 2, 2000	Anderson Mesa	LONEOS	KOR	3.2 km	MPC · JPL
51090	2000 GX_{182}	—	April 5, 2000	Anderson Mesa	LONEOS	·	3.7 km	MPC · JPL
51091	2000 GH_{183}	—	April 3, 2000	Kitt Peak	Spacewatch	EUN	2.9 km	MPC · JPL
51092	2000 HH	—	April 23, 2000	Kurohone	T. Kobayashi	MAR	5.7 km	MPC · JPL
51093	2000 HQ_{1}	—	April 25, 2000	Kitt Peak	Spacewatch	·	4.9 km	MPC · JPL
51094	2000 HO_{4}	—	April 27, 2000	Kitt Peak	Spacewatch	·	12 km	MPC · JPL
51095	2000 HW_{5}	—	April 24, 2000	Kitt Peak	Spacewatch	KOR	3.9 km	MPC · JPL
51096	2000 HP_{7}	—	April 27, 2000	Socorro	LINEAR	·	12 km	MPC · JPL
51097	2000 HA_{8}	—	April 27, 2000	Socorro	LINEAR	KOR	4.0 km	MPC · JPL
51098	2000 HS_{8}	—	April 27, 2000	Socorro	LINEAR	KOR	3.8 km	MPC · JPL
51099	2000 HZ_{8}	—	April 27, 2000	Socorro	LINEAR	EOS	5.2 km	MPC · JPL
51100	2000 HQ_{10}	—	April 27, 2000	Socorro	LINEAR	·	8.0 km	MPC · JPL

== 51101–51200 ==
back to top

Designation			Discovery			Properties		Ref
Permanent	Provisional	Named after	Date	Site	Discoverer(s)	Category	Diam.	Ref
51101	2000 HY_{10}	—	April 27, 2000	Socorro	LINEAR	THM	7.2 km	MPC · JPL
51102	2000 HH_{12}	—	April 28, 2000	Socorro	LINEAR	·	5.5 km	MPC · JPL
51103	2000 HX_{12}	—	April 28, 2000	Socorro	LINEAR	·	13 km	MPC · JPL
51104	2000 HJ_{13}	—	April 28, 2000	Socorro	LINEAR	·	4.6 km	MPC · JPL
51105	2000 HQ_{13}	—	April 28, 2000	Socorro	LINEAR	THM	8.0 km	MPC · JPL
51106	2000 HB_{15}	—	April 27, 2000	Socorro	LINEAR	·	4.2 km	MPC · JPL
51107	2000 HF_{17}	—	April 24, 2000	Kitt Peak	Spacewatch	HYG	7.6 km	MPC · JPL
51108	2000 HP_{22}	—	April 29, 2000	Socorro	LINEAR	KOR	2.8 km	MPC · JPL
51109	2000 HA_{25}	—	April 24, 2000	Anderson Mesa	LONEOS	·	2.1 km	MPC · JPL
51110	2000 HE_{25}	—	April 24, 2000	Anderson Mesa	LONEOS	PAD	5.6 km	MPC · JPL
51111	2000 HM_{26}	—	April 24, 2000	Anderson Mesa	LONEOS	·	3.1 km	MPC · JPL
51112	2000 HQ_{27}	—	April 28, 2000	Socorro	LINEAR	H	1.4 km	MPC · JPL
51113	2000 HZ_{28}	—	April 30, 2000	Socorro	LINEAR	EOS	5.7 km	MPC · JPL
51114	2000 HH_{29}	—	April 27, 2000	Socorro	LINEAR	·	9.1 km	MPC · JPL
51115	2000 HU_{29}	—	April 28, 2000	Socorro	LINEAR	·	11 km	MPC · JPL
51116	2000 HQ_{31}	—	April 29, 2000	Socorro	LINEAR	(6355)	9.7 km	MPC · JPL
51117	2000 HW_{31}	—	April 29, 2000	Socorro	LINEAR	THM	6.8 km	MPC · JPL
51118	2000 HC_{33}	—	April 29, 2000	Socorro	LINEAR	·	17 km	MPC · JPL
51119	2000 HE_{33}	—	April 29, 2000	Socorro	LINEAR	LUT	12 km	MPC · JPL
51120	2000 HW_{33}	—	April 24, 2000	Anderson Mesa	LONEOS	·	3.3 km	MPC · JPL
51121	2000 HC_{34}	—	April 25, 2000	Anderson Mesa	LONEOS	EUN	2.7 km	MPC · JPL
51122	2000 HN_{35}	—	April 27, 2000	Socorro	LINEAR	·	9.1 km	MPC · JPL
51123	2000 HS_{35}	—	April 28, 2000	Socorro	LINEAR	ADE	7.8 km	MPC · JPL
51124	2000 HV_{35}	—	April 28, 2000	Socorro	LINEAR	·	4.7 km	MPC · JPL
51125	2000 HM_{36}	—	April 28, 2000	Socorro	LINEAR	EOS	4.8 km	MPC · JPL
51126	2000 HR_{36}	—	April 28, 2000	Socorro	LINEAR	EUN	4.0 km	MPC · JPL
51127	2000 HH_{37}	—	April 28, 2000	Socorro	LINEAR	·	4.3 km	MPC · JPL
51128	2000 HW_{38}	—	April 28, 2000	Kitt Peak	Spacewatch	HYG	5.9 km	MPC · JPL
51129	2000 HJ_{39}	—	April 29, 2000	Kitt Peak	Spacewatch	TEL	4.6 km	MPC · JPL
51130	2000 HF_{40}	—	April 30, 2000	Kitt Peak	Spacewatch	KOR	3.1 km	MPC · JPL
51131	2000 HM_{41}	—	April 28, 2000	Socorro	LINEAR	MAR	5.3 km	MPC · JPL
51132	2000 HB_{42}	—	April 29, 2000	Socorro	LINEAR	·	4.3 km	MPC · JPL
51133	2000 HZ_{43}	—	April 24, 2000	Anderson Mesa	LONEOS	DOR	4.7 km	MPC · JPL
51134	2000 HG_{44}	—	April 26, 2000	Anderson Mesa	LONEOS	·	4.9 km	MPC · JPL
51135	2000 HO_{44}	—	April 26, 2000	Anderson Mesa	LONEOS	·	11 km	MPC · JPL
51136	2000 HQ_{44}	—	April 26, 2000	Anderson Mesa	LONEOS	VER	8.9 km	MPC · JPL
51137	2000 HS_{44}	—	April 26, 2000	Anderson Mesa	LONEOS	·	3.1 km	MPC · JPL
51138	2000 HC_{45}	—	April 26, 2000	Anderson Mesa	LONEOS	EOS	6.1 km	MPC · JPL
51139	2000 HM_{45}	—	April 26, 2000	Anderson Mesa	LONEOS	·	4.7 km	MPC · JPL
51140	2000 HU_{45}	—	April 26, 2000	Anderson Mesa	LONEOS	·	8.8 km	MPC · JPL
51141	2000 HP_{46}	—	April 29, 2000	Socorro	LINEAR	·	5.2 km	MPC · JPL
51142	2000 HR_{47}	—	April 29, 2000	Socorro	LINEAR	·	5.7 km	MPC · JPL
51143	2000 HA_{48}	—	April 29, 2000	Socorro	LINEAR	THM	8.8 km	MPC · JPL
51144	2000 HA_{49}	—	April 29, 2000	Socorro	LINEAR	NAE	6.9 km	MPC · JPL
51145	2000 HS_{49}	—	April 29, 2000	Socorro	LINEAR	EUN	3.8 km	MPC · JPL
51146	2000 HW_{49}	—	April 29, 2000	Socorro	LINEAR	·	6.5 km	MPC · JPL
51147	2000 HG_{50}	—	April 29, 2000	Socorro	LINEAR	·	3.1 km	MPC · JPL
51148	2000 HB_{52}	—	April 29, 2000	Socorro	LINEAR	·	6.2 km	MPC · JPL
51149	2000 HF_{52}	—	April 29, 2000	Socorro	LINEAR	·	8.3 km	MPC · JPL
51150	2000 HJ_{53}	—	April 29, 2000	Socorro	LINEAR	·	4.4 km	MPC · JPL
51151	2000 HB_{54}	—	April 29, 2000	Socorro	LINEAR	·	10 km	MPC · JPL
51152	2000 HL_{54}	—	April 29, 2000	Socorro	LINEAR	·	6.4 km	MPC · JPL
51153	2000 HA_{56}	—	April 24, 2000	Anderson Mesa	LONEOS	EOS	3.8 km	MPC · JPL
51154	2000 HC_{56}	—	April 24, 2000	Anderson Mesa	LONEOS	THM	6.5 km	MPC · JPL
51155	2000 HH_{56}	—	April 24, 2000	Anderson Mesa	LONEOS	EOS	5.8 km	MPC · JPL
51156	2000 HJ_{56}	—	April 24, 2000	Anderson Mesa	LONEOS	·	9.2 km	MPC · JPL
51157	2000 HB_{57}	—	April 24, 2000	Anderson Mesa	LONEOS	·	1.9 km	MPC · JPL
51158	2000 HG_{57}	—	April 24, 2000	Anderson Mesa	LONEOS	HYG	8.2 km	MPC · JPL
51159	2000 HO_{57}	—	April 24, 2000	Anderson Mesa	LONEOS	·	8.9 km	MPC · JPL
51160	2000 HR_{57}	—	April 24, 2000	Anderson Mesa	LONEOS	·	4.3 km	MPC · JPL
51161	2000 HY_{57}	—	April 24, 2000	Anderson Mesa	LONEOS	(5)	3.2 km	MPC · JPL
51162	2000 HP_{58}	—	April 25, 2000	Anderson Mesa	LONEOS	·	3.8 km	MPC · JPL
51163	2000 HU_{58}	—	April 25, 2000	Anderson Mesa	LONEOS	EOS	5.7 km	MPC · JPL
51164	2000 HR_{62}	—	April 25, 2000	Kvistaberg	Uppsala-DLR Asteroid Survey	·	3.1 km	MPC · JPL
51165	2000 HO_{63}	—	April 26, 2000	Anderson Mesa	LONEOS	KOR	3.8 km	MPC · JPL
51166 Huimanto	2000 HW_{63}	Huimanto	April 26, 2000	Anderson Mesa	LONEOS	THM	8.6 km	MPC · JPL
51167	2000 HF_{64}	—	April 26, 2000	Anderson Mesa	LONEOS	·	4.2 km	MPC · JPL
51168	2000 HC_{65}	—	April 26, 2000	Anderson Mesa	LONEOS	·	3.2 km	MPC · JPL
51169	2000 HQ_{65}	—	April 26, 2000	Anderson Mesa	LONEOS	·	4.1 km	MPC · JPL
51170	2000 HJ_{66}	—	April 26, 2000	Anderson Mesa	LONEOS	·	6.4 km	MPC · JPL
51171	2000 HW_{66}	—	April 27, 2000	Anderson Mesa	LONEOS	·	8.8 km	MPC · JPL
51172	2000 HX_{67}	—	April 27, 2000	Anderson Mesa	LONEOS	·	3.6 km	MPC · JPL
51173	2000 HD_{69}	—	April 24, 2000	Anderson Mesa	LONEOS	·	5.3 km	MPC · JPL
51174	2000 HH_{69}	—	April 24, 2000	Anderson Mesa	LONEOS	EOS · slow	4.3 km	MPC · JPL
51175	2000 HV_{69}	—	April 26, 2000	Anderson Mesa	LONEOS	·	4.3 km	MPC · JPL
51176	2000 HF_{70}	—	April 26, 2000	Anderson Mesa	LONEOS	·	5.4 km	MPC · JPL
51177	2000 HM_{70}	—	April 26, 2000	Anderson Mesa	LONEOS	·	9.0 km	MPC · JPL
51178 Geraintjones	2000 HX_{70}	Geraintjones	April 26, 2000	Anderson Mesa	LONEOS	T_{j} (2.98) · HIL · 3:2	19 km	MPC · JPL
51179	2000 HM_{71}	—	April 24, 2000	Anderson Mesa	LONEOS	·	6.0 km	MPC · JPL
51180	2000 HN_{73}	—	April 27, 2000	Anderson Mesa	LONEOS	EUN	3.3 km	MPC · JPL
51181	2000 HT_{74}	—	April 27, 2000	Socorro	LINEAR	·	6.4 km	MPC · JPL
51182	2000 HP_{76}	—	April 27, 2000	Socorro	LINEAR	·	8.1 km	MPC · JPL
51183	2000 HS_{76}	—	April 27, 2000	Socorro	LINEAR	·	3.8 km	MPC · JPL
51184	2000 HQ_{78}	—	April 28, 2000	Socorro	LINEAR	EOS	6.1 km	MPC · JPL
51185	2000 HP_{85}	—	April 30, 2000	Anderson Mesa	LONEOS	VER	7.0 km	MPC · JPL
51186	2000 HW_{86}	—	April 30, 2000	Anderson Mesa	LONEOS	ADE	6.8 km	MPC · JPL
51187	2000 HM_{88}	—	April 28, 2000	Socorro	LINEAR	BRG	5.3 km	MPC · JPL
51188	2000 HB_{90}	—	April 29, 2000	Socorro	LINEAR	(31811)	6.0 km	MPC · JPL
51189	2000 HA_{91}	—	April 30, 2000	Anderson Mesa	LONEOS	·	8.9 km	MPC · JPL
51190	2000 HF_{94}	—	April 29, 2000	Anderson Mesa	LONEOS	·	3.8 km	MPC · JPL
51191	2000 HT_{94}	—	April 29, 2000	Socorro	LINEAR	·	5.1 km	MPC · JPL
51192	2000 HJ_{95}	—	April 28, 2000	Socorro	LINEAR	·	11 km	MPC · JPL
51193	2000 HT_{96}	—	April 30, 2000	Anderson Mesa	LONEOS	·	4.2 km	MPC · JPL
51194	2000 HY_{99}	—	April 27, 2000	Anderson Mesa	LONEOS	EOS	3.8 km	MPC · JPL
51195	2000 HZ_{101}	—	April 27, 2000	Anderson Mesa	LONEOS	·	7.0 km	MPC · JPL
51196	2000 HT_{104}	—	April 26, 2000	Anderson Mesa	LONEOS	·	2.9 km	MPC · JPL
51197	2000 JJ	—	May 1, 2000	Socorro	LINEAR	MAR	5.1 km	MPC · JPL
51198	2000 JO_{3}	—	May 4, 2000	Socorro	LINEAR	·	2.5 km	MPC · JPL
51199	2000 JA_{4}	—	May 4, 2000	Kleť	Kleť	CYB	7.6 km	MPC · JPL
51200	2000 JT_{5}	—	May 1, 2000	Socorro	LINEAR	·	5.1 km	MPC · JPL

== 51201–51300 ==
back to top

Designation			Discovery			Properties		Ref
Permanent	Provisional	Named after	Date	Site	Discoverer(s)	Category	Diam.	Ref
51201	2000 JG_{6}	—	May 3, 2000	Socorro	LINEAR	EUN	3.2 km	MPC · JPL
51202	2000 JR_{6}	—	May 4, 2000	Socorro	LINEAR	·	9.3 km	MPC · JPL
51203	2000 JW_{7}	—	May 5, 2000	Kitt Peak	Spacewatch	·	3.4 km	MPC · JPL
51204	2000 JE_{9}	—	May 3, 2000	Socorro	LINEAR	·	3.9 km	MPC · JPL
51205	2000 JV_{9}	—	May 4, 2000	Socorro	LINEAR	·	4.3 km	MPC · JPL
51206	2000 JL_{11}	—	May 3, 2000	Socorro	LINEAR	·	3.9 km	MPC · JPL
51207	2000 JR_{11}	—	May 3, 2000	Socorro	LINEAR	EUN	4.8 km	MPC · JPL
51208	2000 JV_{13}	—	May 6, 2000	Socorro	LINEAR	·	5.6 km	MPC · JPL
51209	2000 JG_{14}	—	May 6, 2000	Socorro	LINEAR	·	9.7 km	MPC · JPL
51210	2000 JT_{19}	—	May 5, 2000	Socorro	LINEAR	HYG	8.5 km	MPC · JPL
51211	2000 JA_{20}	—	May 6, 2000	Socorro	LINEAR	·	4.4 km	MPC · JPL
51212	2000 JT_{20}	—	May 6, 2000	Socorro	LINEAR	·	3.7 km	MPC · JPL
51213	2000 JU_{20}	—	May 6, 2000	Socorro	LINEAR	·	7.6 km	MPC · JPL
51214	2000 JF_{22}	—	May 6, 2000	Socorro	LINEAR	HYG	10 km	MPC · JPL
51215	2000 JL_{22}	—	May 6, 2000	Socorro	LINEAR	·	6.7 km	MPC · JPL
51216	2000 JU_{22}	—	May 7, 2000	Socorro	LINEAR	·	7.1 km	MPC · JPL
51217	2000 JV_{22}	—	May 7, 2000	Socorro	LINEAR	·	4.5 km	MPC · JPL
51218	2000 JC_{23}	—	May 7, 2000	Socorro	LINEAR	EOS	7.3 km	MPC · JPL
51219	2000 JE_{23}	—	May 7, 2000	Socorro	LINEAR	fast	6.5 km	MPC · JPL
51220	2000 JG_{23}	—	May 7, 2000	Socorro	LINEAR	EUN · slow?	3.2 km	MPC · JPL
51221	2000 JK_{23}	—	May 7, 2000	Socorro	LINEAR	·	3.4 km	MPC · JPL
51222	2000 JE_{24}	—	May 7, 2000	Socorro	LINEAR	EOS	6.4 km	MPC · JPL
51223	2000 JQ_{24}	—	May 7, 2000	Socorro	LINEAR	·	2.9 km	MPC · JPL
51224	2000 JU_{24}	—	May 7, 2000	Socorro	LINEAR	EOS	6.6 km	MPC · JPL
51225	2000 JW_{24}	—	May 7, 2000	Socorro	LINEAR	·	4.7 km	MPC · JPL
51226	2000 JJ_{25}	—	May 7, 2000	Socorro	LINEAR	·	4.7 km	MPC · JPL
51227	2000 JK_{25}	—	May 7, 2000	Socorro	LINEAR	·	9.1 km	MPC · JPL
51228	2000 JQ_{26}	—	May 7, 2000	Socorro	LINEAR	fast	5.1 km	MPC · JPL
51229	2000 JF_{27}	—	May 7, 2000	Socorro	LINEAR	LIX	12 km	MPC · JPL
51230	2000 JL_{27}	—	May 7, 2000	Socorro	LINEAR	·	8.8 km	MPC · JPL
51231	2000 JM_{28}	—	May 7, 2000	Socorro	LINEAR	·	6.7 km	MPC · JPL
51232	2000 JX_{30}	—	May 7, 2000	Socorro	LINEAR	EOS	5.1 km	MPC · JPL
51233	2000 JX_{31}	—	May 7, 2000	Socorro	LINEAR	·	11 km	MPC · JPL
51234	2000 JZ_{31}	—	May 7, 2000	Socorro	LINEAR	EOS	5.4 km	MPC · JPL
51235	2000 JD_{32}	—	May 7, 2000	Socorro	LINEAR	·	7.2 km	MPC · JPL
51236	2000 JE_{32}	—	May 7, 2000	Socorro	LINEAR	·	9.4 km	MPC · JPL
51237	2000 JZ_{33}	—	May 7, 2000	Socorro	LINEAR	·	7.9 km	MPC · JPL
51238	2000 JT_{34}	—	May 7, 2000	Socorro	LINEAR	slow	12 km	MPC · JPL
51239	2000 JH_{35}	—	May 7, 2000	Socorro	LINEAR	·	4.1 km	MPC · JPL
51240	2000 JW_{36}	—	May 7, 2000	Socorro	LINEAR	THM	9.5 km	MPC · JPL
51241	2000 JX_{36}	—	May 7, 2000	Socorro	LINEAR	HYG	9.2 km	MPC · JPL
51242	2000 JC_{38}	—	May 7, 2000	Socorro	LINEAR	EUN	3.3 km	MPC · JPL
51243	2000 JG_{38}	—	May 7, 2000	Socorro	LINEAR	·	6.3 km	MPC · JPL
51244	2000 JP_{39}	—	May 7, 2000	Socorro	LINEAR	EOS	8.8 km	MPC · JPL
51245	2000 JW_{40}	—	May 6, 2000	Socorro	LINEAR	·	4.9 km	MPC · JPL
51246	2000 JH_{42}	—	May 7, 2000	Socorro	LINEAR	GEF	2.9 km	MPC · JPL
51247	2000 JL_{45}	—	May 7, 2000	Socorro	LINEAR	·	3.7 km	MPC · JPL
51248	2000 JF_{46}	—	May 7, 2000	Socorro	LINEAR	EOS	5.9 km	MPC · JPL
51249	2000 JA_{47}	—	May 9, 2000	Socorro	LINEAR	EOS	4.7 km	MPC · JPL
51250	2000 JO_{47}	—	May 9, 2000	Socorro	LINEAR	·	12 km	MPC · JPL
51251	2000 JE_{49}	—	May 9, 2000	Socorro	LINEAR	·	5.1 km	MPC · JPL
51252	2000 JT_{49}	—	May 9, 2000	Socorro	LINEAR	KOR	3.9 km	MPC · JPL
51253	2000 JG_{56}	—	May 6, 2000	Socorro	LINEAR	·	3.9 km	MPC · JPL
51254	2000 JK_{57}	—	May 6, 2000	Socorro	LINEAR	·	12 km	MPC · JPL
51255	2000 JX_{57}	—	May 6, 2000	Socorro	LINEAR	·	11 km	MPC · JPL
51256	2000 JB_{58}	—	May 6, 2000	Socorro	LINEAR	·	6.7 km	MPC · JPL
51257	2000 JL_{59}	—	May 7, 2000	Socorro	LINEAR	EOS	6.0 km	MPC · JPL
51258	2000 JU_{59}	—	May 7, 2000	Socorro	LINEAR	·	9.8 km	MPC · JPL
51259	2000 JY_{59}	—	May 7, 2000	Socorro	LINEAR	·	6.8 km	MPC · JPL
51260	2000 JZ_{62}	—	May 9, 2000	Socorro	LINEAR	EOS	7.5 km	MPC · JPL
51261 Holuša	2000 JH_{64}	Holuša	May 13, 2000	Ondřejov	L. Kotková	·	5.0 km	MPC · JPL
51262	2000 JC_{69}	—	May 1, 2000	Anderson Mesa	LONEOS	EUN	6.3 km	MPC · JPL
51263	2000 JM_{69}	—	May 1, 2000	Anderson Mesa	LONEOS	·	13 km	MPC · JPL
51264	2000 JH_{71}	—	May 1, 2000	Anderson Mesa	LONEOS	·	8.5 km	MPC · JPL
51265	2000 JM_{71}	—	May 1, 2000	Anderson Mesa	LONEOS	·	4.1 km	MPC · JPL
51266	2000 JX_{71}	—	May 1, 2000	Anderson Mesa	LONEOS	·	6.1 km	MPC · JPL
51267	2000 JE_{72}	—	May 1, 2000	Kitt Peak	Spacewatch	·	7.1 km	MPC · JPL
51268	2000 JM_{72}	—	May 1, 2000	Haleakala	NEAT	GEF	3.5 km	MPC · JPL
51269	2000 JU_{72}	—	May 2, 2000	Anderson Mesa	LONEOS	·	5.9 km	MPC · JPL
51270	2000 JK_{73}	—	May 2, 2000	Haleakala	NEAT	·	3.2 km	MPC · JPL
51271	2000 JD_{74}	—	May 4, 2000	Anderson Mesa	LONEOS	·	4.8 km	MPC · JPL
51272	2000 JO_{74}	—	May 4, 2000	Anderson Mesa	LONEOS	·	3.6 km	MPC · JPL
51273	2000 JV_{74}	—	May 4, 2000	Kitt Peak	Spacewatch	·	6.6 km	MPC · JPL
51274	2000 JR_{77}	—	May 9, 2000	Socorro	LINEAR	·	5.9 km	MPC · JPL
51275	2000 JW_{78}	—	May 4, 2000	Socorro	LINEAR	EOS	4.4 km	MPC · JPL
51276	2000 JZ_{81}	—	May 7, 2000	Anderson Mesa	LONEOS	EUN	4.2 km	MPC · JPL
51277	2000 JK_{82}	—	May 7, 2000	Socorro	LINEAR	·	7.6 km	MPC · JPL
51278	2000 JC_{84}	—	May 5, 2000	Socorro	LINEAR	EOS	3.8 km	MPC · JPL
51279	2000 JC_{85}	—	May 5, 2000	Socorro	LINEAR	TIR	7.7 km	MPC · JPL
51280	2000 KG_{4}	—	May 24, 2000	Tebbutt	F. B. Zoltowski	·	4.4 km	MPC · JPL
51281	2000 KW_{6}	—	May 27, 2000	Socorro	LINEAR	EOS	5.8 km	MPC · JPL
51282	2000 KC_{7}	—	May 27, 2000	Socorro	LINEAR	EOS	7.1 km	MPC · JPL
51283	2000 KN_{7}	—	May 27, 2000	Socorro	LINEAR	·	5.9 km	MPC · JPL
51284	2000 KE_{9}	—	May 28, 2000	Socorro	LINEAR	3:2	9.9 km	MPC · JPL
51285	2000 KM_{15}	—	May 28, 2000	Socorro	LINEAR	·	3.9 km	MPC · JPL
51286	2000 KX_{15}	—	May 28, 2000	Socorro	LINEAR	·	11 km	MPC · JPL
51287	2000 KH_{16}	—	May 28, 2000	Socorro	LINEAR	·	6.4 km	MPC · JPL
51288	2000 KH_{20}	—	May 28, 2000	Socorro	LINEAR	THM	5.8 km	MPC · JPL
51289	2000 KK_{21}	—	May 28, 2000	Socorro	LINEAR	·	10 km	MPC · JPL
51290	2000 KF_{27}	—	May 28, 2000	Socorro	LINEAR	THM	8.0 km	MPC · JPL
51291	2000 KK_{29}	—	May 28, 2000	Socorro	LINEAR	·	21 km	MPC · JPL
51292	2000 KF_{30}	—	May 28, 2000	Socorro	LINEAR	KOR	4.6 km	MPC · JPL
51293	2000 KP_{30}	—	May 28, 2000	Socorro	LINEAR	EOS · slow	6.2 km	MPC · JPL
51294	2000 KT_{30}	—	May 28, 2000	Socorro	LINEAR	·	3.2 km	MPC · JPL
51295	2000 KF_{36}	—	May 27, 2000	Socorro	LINEAR	·	4.1 km	MPC · JPL
51296	2000 KA_{37}	—	May 29, 2000	Socorro	LINEAR	·	3.7 km	MPC · JPL
51297	2000 KN_{45}	—	May 30, 2000	Kitt Peak	Spacewatch	·	12 km	MPC · JPL
51298	2000 KY_{51}	—	May 23, 2000	Anderson Mesa	LONEOS	3:2	15 km	MPC · JPL
51299	2000 KK_{52}	—	May 23, 2000	Anderson Mesa	LONEOS	·	5.8 km	MPC · JPL
51300	2000 KL_{52}	—	May 24, 2000	Anderson Mesa	LONEOS	·	4.8 km	MPC · JPL

== 51301–51400 ==
back to top

Designation			Discovery			Properties		Ref
Permanent	Provisional	Named after	Date	Site	Discoverer(s)	Category	Diam.	Ref
51301	2000 KX_{54}	—	May 27, 2000	Socorro	LINEAR	EOS	6.0 km	MPC · JPL
51302	2000 KY_{54}	—	May 27, 2000	Socorro	LINEAR	EUN	4.7 km	MPC · JPL
51303	2000 KR_{56}	—	May 27, 2000	Socorro	LINEAR	EOS	6.9 km	MPC · JPL
51304	2000 KB_{58}	—	May 24, 2000	Anderson Mesa	LONEOS	·	6.6 km	MPC · JPL
51305	2000 KL_{58}	—	May 24, 2000	Anderson Mesa	LONEOS	EOS	6.7 km	MPC · JPL
51306	2000 KL_{59}	—	May 25, 2000	Anderson Mesa	LONEOS	·	7.6 km	MPC · JPL
51307	2000 KF_{61}	—	May 25, 2000	Anderson Mesa	LONEOS	·	5.8 km	MPC · JPL
51308	2000 KK_{62}	—	May 26, 2000	Anderson Mesa	LONEOS	EUN	3.8 km	MPC · JPL
51309	2000 KN_{62}	—	May 26, 2000	Anderson Mesa	LONEOS	CYB	11 km	MPC · JPL
51310	2000 KY_{62}	—	May 26, 2000	Anderson Mesa	LONEOS	EOS	5.1 km	MPC · JPL
51311	2000 KJ_{65}	—	May 27, 2000	Socorro	LINEAR	EOS	5.3 km	MPC · JPL
51312	2000 KG_{66}	—	May 27, 2000	Socorro	LINEAR	EOS	5.2 km	MPC · JPL
51313	2000 KF_{71}	—	May 28, 2000	Socorro	LINEAR	·	3.7 km	MPC · JPL
51314	2000 KX_{73}	—	May 27, 2000	Socorro	LINEAR	·	10 km	MPC · JPL
51315	2000 KY_{73}	—	May 27, 2000	Socorro	LINEAR	·	4.3 km	MPC · JPL
51316	2000 KZ_{73}	—	May 27, 2000	Socorro	LINEAR	EOS	4.7 km	MPC · JPL
51317	2000 KZ_{75}	—	May 27, 2000	Socorro	LINEAR	·	7.9 km	MPC · JPL
51318	2000 KT_{77}	—	May 27, 2000	Socorro	LINEAR	EOS	6.2 km	MPC · JPL
51319	2000 KF_{80}	—	May 27, 2000	Socorro	LINEAR	·	12 km	MPC · JPL
51320	2000 KP_{81}	—	May 25, 2000	Anderson Mesa	LONEOS	HYG	8.0 km	MPC · JPL
51321	2000 LL_{1}	—	June 1, 2000	Bergisch Gladbach	W. Bickel	·	4.1 km	MPC · JPL
51322	2000 LY_{5}	—	June 6, 2000	Reedy Creek	J. Broughton	HYG	6.3 km	MPC · JPL
51323	2000 LQ_{8}	—	June 4, 2000	Ondřejov	L. Kotková	·	6.4 km	MPC · JPL
51324	2000 LV_{8}	—	June 5, 2000	Socorro	LINEAR	·	15 km	MPC · JPL
51325	2000 LV_{16}	—	June 4, 2000	Socorro	LINEAR	EOS	5.9 km	MPC · JPL
51326	2000 LY_{16}	—	June 4, 2000	Socorro	LINEAR	EOS	6.9 km	MPC · JPL
51327	2000 LA_{19}	—	June 8, 2000	Socorro	LINEAR	·	21 km	MPC · JPL
51328	2000 LO_{19}	—	June 8, 2000	Socorro	LINEAR	·	14 km	MPC · JPL
51329	2000 LP_{32}	—	June 4, 2000	Socorro	LINEAR	·	9.2 km	MPC · JPL
51330	2000 LK_{33}	—	June 4, 2000	Haleakala	NEAT	·	7.0 km	MPC · JPL
51331	2000 LH_{35}	—	June 1, 2000	Haleakala	NEAT	EOS	5.0 km	MPC · JPL
51332	2000 LP_{35}	—	June 1, 2000	Anderson Mesa	LONEOS	·	14 km	MPC · JPL
51333	2000 ME	—	June 22, 2000	Reedy Creek	J. Broughton	·	4.6 km	MPC · JPL
51334	2000 NW_{11}	—	July 4, 2000	Anderson Mesa	LONEOS	EMA	8.4 km	MPC · JPL
51335	2000 NZ_{11}	—	July 4, 2000	Anderson Mesa	LONEOS	·	2.6 km	MPC · JPL
51336	2000 NV_{26}	—	July 4, 2000	Anderson Mesa	LONEOS	VER	9.8 km	MPC · JPL
51337	2000 OK_{12}	—	July 23, 2000	Socorro	LINEAR	·	2.0 km	MPC · JPL
51338	2000 OZ_{24}	—	July 23, 2000	Socorro	LINEAR	·	11 km	MPC · JPL
51339	2000 OA_{61}	—	July 28, 2000	OCA-Anza	OCA-Anza	L5	19 km	MPC · JPL
51340	2000 QJ_{12}	—	August 24, 2000	Socorro	LINEAR	L5	23 km	MPC · JPL
51341	2000 QP_{26}	—	August 23, 2000	Nachi-Katsuura	Y. Shimizu, T. Urata	·	3.5 km	MPC · JPL
51342	2000 QO_{75}	—	August 24, 2000	Socorro	LINEAR	·	4.8 km	MPC · JPL
51343	2000 QR_{80}	—	August 24, 2000	Socorro	LINEAR	·	2.9 km	MPC · JPL
51344	2000 QA_{127}	—	August 24, 2000	Socorro	LINEAR	L5	18 km	MPC · JPL
51345	2000 QH_{137}	—	August 31, 2000	Socorro	LINEAR	L5	24 km	MPC · JPL
51346	2000 QX_{158}	—	August 31, 2000	Socorro	LINEAR	L5	21 km	MPC · JPL
51347	2000 QZ_{165}	—	August 31, 2000	Socorro	LINEAR	L5	23 km	MPC · JPL
51348	2000 QR_{169}	—	August 31, 2000	Socorro	LINEAR	L5	18 km	MPC · JPL
51349	2000 QQ_{173}	—	August 31, 2000	Socorro	LINEAR	3:2	20 km	MPC · JPL
51350	2000 QU_{176}	—	August 31, 2000	Socorro	LINEAR	L5	27 km	MPC · JPL
51351	2000 QO_{218}	—	August 20, 2000	Kitt Peak	Spacewatch	L5	20 km	MPC · JPL
51352	2000 RW_{9}	—	September 1, 2000	Socorro	LINEAR	·	2.3 km	MPC · JPL
51353	2000 RQ_{14}	—	September 1, 2000	Socorro	LINEAR	·	3.6 km	MPC · JPL
51354	2000 RX_{25}	—	September 1, 2000	Socorro	LINEAR	L5	29 km	MPC · JPL
51355	2000 RM_{50}	—	September 5, 2000	Socorro	LINEAR	·	4.0 km	MPC · JPL
51356	2000 RY_{76}	—	September 8, 2000	Socorro	LINEAR	H · moon	2.0 km	MPC · JPL
51357	2000 RM_{88}	—	September 3, 2000	Socorro	LINEAR	L5	19 km	MPC · JPL
51358	2000 SO_{5}	—	September 21, 2000	Socorro	LINEAR	MAR · slow	3.7 km	MPC · JPL
51359	2000 SC_{17}	—	September 23, 2000	Socorro	LINEAR	L5	23 km	MPC · JPL
51360	2000 SZ_{25}	—	September 23, 2000	Socorro	LINEAR	L5	20 km	MPC · JPL
51361	2000 SS_{124}	—	September 24, 2000	Socorro	LINEAR	·	8.9 km	MPC · JPL
51362	2000 SY_{247}	—	September 24, 2000	Socorro	LINEAR	L5	18 km	MPC · JPL
51363	2000 SO_{319}	—	September 26, 2000	Socorro	LINEAR	·	3.1 km	MPC · JPL
51364	2000 SU_{333}	—	September 26, 2000	Haleakala	NEAT	L5	28 km	MPC · JPL
51365	2000 TA_{42}	—	October 1, 2000	Socorro	LINEAR	L5	41 km	MPC · JPL
51366	2000 UU_{88}	—	October 31, 2000	Socorro	LINEAR	·	1.9 km	MPC · JPL
51367	2000 UD_{104}	—	October 25, 2000	Socorro	LINEAR	·	3.0 km	MPC · JPL
51368	2000 WV_{60}	—	November 21, 2000	Socorro	LINEAR	·	2.2 km	MPC · JPL
51369	2000 WD_{158}	—	November 30, 2000	Socorro	LINEAR	·	5.4 km	MPC · JPL
51370	2000 WS_{165}	—	November 23, 2000	Haleakala	NEAT	PHO	3.1 km	MPC · JPL
51371	2000 XF_{15}	—	December 5, 2000	Socorro	LINEAR	H	2.3 km	MPC · JPL
51372	2000 YM_{18}	—	December 21, 2000	Socorro	LINEAR	·	2.0 km	MPC · JPL
51373	2000 YF_{53}	—	December 30, 2000	Socorro	LINEAR	MAR	3.3 km	MPC · JPL
51374	2000 YN_{63}	—	December 30, 2000	Socorro	LINEAR	·	2.8 km	MPC · JPL
51375	2000 YO_{120}	—	December 19, 2000	Socorro	LINEAR	H	1.8 km	MPC · JPL
51376	2001 AZ_{23}	—	January 3, 2001	Socorro	LINEAR	V	2.0 km	MPC · JPL
51377	2001 AK_{28}	—	January 5, 2001	Socorro	LINEAR	H	1.4 km	MPC · JPL
51378	2001 AT_{33}	—	January 4, 2001	Socorro	LINEAR	L4	23 km	MPC · JPL
51379	2001 BY_{7}	—	January 19, 2001	Socorro	LINEAR	·	2.6 km	MPC · JPL
51380	2001 BM_{44}	—	January 19, 2001	Socorro	LINEAR	·	4.8 km	MPC · JPL
51381	2001 BG_{51}	—	January 26, 2001	Socorro	LINEAR	PHO	3.9 km	MPC · JPL
51382	2001 BK_{73}	—	January 28, 2001	Haleakala	NEAT	·	4.0 km	MPC · JPL
51383	2001 BF_{77}	—	January 26, 2001	Socorro	LINEAR	·	2.2 km	MPC · JPL
51384	2001 CP_{4}	—	February 1, 2001	Socorro	LINEAR	·	3.8 km	MPC · JPL
51385	2001 CR_{20}	—	February 3, 2001	Socorro	LINEAR	H	1.2 km	MPC · JPL
51386	2001 CN_{35}	—	February 3, 2001	Socorro	LINEAR	H	1.9 km	MPC · JPL
51387	2001 DU_{6}	—	February 17, 2001	Višnjan Observatory	K. Korlević	·	4.7 km	MPC · JPL
51388	2001 DE_{14}	—	February 19, 2001	Socorro	LINEAR	·	1.5 km	MPC · JPL
51389	2001 DH_{15}	—	February 16, 2001	Socorro	LINEAR	·	2.5 km	MPC · JPL
51390	2001 DW_{18}	—	February 16, 2001	Socorro	LINEAR	·	5.1 km	MPC · JPL
51391	2001 DM_{21}	—	February 16, 2001	Socorro	LINEAR	·	3.6 km	MPC · JPL
51392	2001 DW_{30}	—	February 17, 2001	Socorro	LINEAR	·	4.7 km	MPC · JPL
51393	2001 DW_{44}	—	February 19, 2001	Socorro	LINEAR	·	2.3 km	MPC · JPL
51394	2001 DX_{49}	—	February 16, 2001	Socorro	LINEAR	·	3.9 km	MPC · JPL
51395	2001 DH_{71}	—	February 19, 2001	Socorro	LINEAR	MAS	1.7 km	MPC · JPL
51396	2001 DW_{71}	—	February 19, 2001	Socorro	LINEAR	·	2.2 km	MPC · JPL
51397	2001 DT_{74}	—	February 19, 2001	Socorro	LINEAR	·	4.3 km	MPC · JPL
51398	2001 DJ_{80}	—	February 24, 2001	Reedy Creek	J. Broughton	·	2.6 km	MPC · JPL
51399	2001 DG_{81}	—	February 26, 2001	Oizumi	T. Kobayashi	V	1.9 km	MPC · JPL
51400	2001 DN_{81}	—	February 26, 2001	Oizumi	T. Kobayashi	·	4.9 km	MPC · JPL

== 51401–51500 ==
back to top

Designation			Discovery			Properties		Ref
Permanent	Provisional	Named after	Date	Site	Discoverer(s)	Category	Diam.	Ref
51401	2001 DX_{82}	—	February 22, 2001	Kitt Peak	Spacewatch	·	1.8 km	MPC · JPL
51402	2001 DC_{92}	—	February 20, 2001	Kitt Peak	Spacewatch	·	1.9 km	MPC · JPL
51403	2001 DE_{99}	—	February 17, 2001	Socorro	LINEAR	·	1.8 km	MPC · JPL
51404	2001 DV_{99}	—	February 17, 2001	Socorro	LINEAR	NYS	3.0 km	MPC · JPL
51405	2001 DL_{106}	—	February 23, 2001	Kitt Peak	Spacewatch	L4	14 km	MPC · JPL
51406 Massimocalvani	2001 DL_{108}	Massimocalvani	February 26, 2001	Cima Ekar	ADAS	(194)	3.0 km	MPC · JPL
51407	2001 EU_{5}	—	March 2, 2001	Anderson Mesa	LONEOS	·	3.0 km	MPC · JPL
51408	2001 EQ_{6}	—	March 2, 2001	Anderson Mesa	LONEOS	NYS	2.1 km	MPC · JPL
51409	2001 EU_{6}	—	March 2, 2001	Anderson Mesa	LONEOS	·	5.4 km	MPC · JPL
51410	2001 EJ_{7}	—	March 2, 2001	Anderson Mesa	LONEOS	·	1.4 km	MPC · JPL
51411	2001 EL_{9}	—	March 2, 2001	Anderson Mesa	LONEOS	·	1.7 km	MPC · JPL
51412	2001 EE_{10}	—	March 2, 2001	Anderson Mesa	LONEOS	·	3.4 km	MPC · JPL
51413	2001 EO_{11}	—	March 2, 2001	Haleakala	NEAT	·	2.6 km	MPC · JPL
51414	2001 EK_{12}	—	March 3, 2001	Socorro	LINEAR	·	3.6 km	MPC · JPL
51415 Tovinder	2001 ER_{13}	Tovinder	March 15, 2001	Needville	J. Dellinger, Dillon, W. G.	V	2.1 km	MPC · JPL
51416	2001 EX_{15}	—	March 15, 2001	Oizumi	T. Kobayashi	·	4.2 km	MPC · JPL
51417	2001 EG_{17}	—	March 15, 2001	Socorro	LINEAR	H	1.4 km	MPC · JPL
51418	2001 EO_{17}	—	March 15, 2001	Socorro	LINEAR	H	1.3 km	MPC · JPL
51419 Deshapriya	2001 EJ_{20}	Deshapriya	March 15, 2001	Anderson Mesa	LONEOS	·	2.9 km	MPC · JPL
51420	2001 EV_{20}	—	March 15, 2001	Anderson Mesa	LONEOS	ERI	3.7 km	MPC · JPL
51421	2001 EC_{22}	—	March 15, 2001	Anderson Mesa	LONEOS	·	1.8 km	MPC · JPL
51422	2001 EJ_{24}	—	March 3, 2001	Socorro	LINEAR	slow	2.0 km	MPC · JPL
51423	2001 FJ	—	March 16, 2001	Haleakala	NEAT	MAS	1.9 km	MPC · JPL
51424	2001 FK	—	March 16, 2001	Socorro	LINEAR	H	1.3 km	MPC · JPL
51425	2001 FV_{1}	—	March 16, 2001	Socorro	LINEAR	·	3.2 km	MPC · JPL
51426	2001 FV_{3}	—	March 18, 2001	Socorro	LINEAR	·	2.1 km	MPC · JPL
51427	2001 FE_{4}	—	March 19, 2001	Oizumi	T. Kobayashi	·	2.2 km	MPC · JPL
51428	2001 FS_{4}	—	March 18, 2001	Socorro	LINEAR	·	2.6 km	MPC · JPL
51429	2001 FU_{5}	—	March 18, 2001	Socorro	LINEAR	·	4.9 km	MPC · JPL
51430 Ireneclaire	2001 FH_{7}	Ireneclaire	March 20, 2001	Nogales	Tenagra II	V	1.4 km	MPC · JPL
51431 Jayardee	2001 FH_{9}	Jayardee	March 19, 2001	Cordell-Lorenz	D. T. Durig	(6769)	3.7 km	MPC · JPL
51432	2001 FB_{15}	—	March 19, 2001	Anderson Mesa	LONEOS	·	2.1 km	MPC · JPL
51433	2001 FY_{17}	—	March 19, 2001	Anderson Mesa	LONEOS	·	3.1 km	MPC · JPL
51434	2001 FG_{19}	—	March 19, 2001	Anderson Mesa	LONEOS	·	11 km	MPC · JPL
51435	2001 FH_{20}	—	March 19, 2001	Anderson Mesa	LONEOS	·	2.4 km	MPC · JPL
51436	2001 FD_{21}	—	March 19, 2001	Anderson Mesa	LONEOS	·	4.2 km	MPC · JPL
51437	2001 FF_{21}	—	March 21, 2001	Anderson Mesa	LONEOS	·	3.0 km	MPC · JPL
51438	2001 FP_{21}	—	March 21, 2001	Anderson Mesa	LONEOS	·	3.6 km	MPC · JPL
51439	2001 FW_{23}	—	March 19, 2001	Socorro	LINEAR	·	1.4 km	MPC · JPL
51440	2001 FW_{24}	—	March 17, 2001	Socorro	LINEAR	·	2.3 km	MPC · JPL
51441	2001 FY_{25}	—	March 18, 2001	Socorro	LINEAR	·	2.1 km	MPC · JPL
51442	2001 FZ_{25}	—	March 18, 2001	Socorro	LINEAR	·	4.5 km	MPC · JPL
51443	2001 FN_{27}	—	March 18, 2001	Socorro	LINEAR	·	2.1 km	MPC · JPL
51444	2001 FS_{27}	—	March 18, 2001	Socorro	LINEAR	·	2.8 km	MPC · JPL
51445	2001 FM_{28}	—	March 19, 2001	Socorro	LINEAR	V	1.4 km	MPC · JPL
51446	2001 FX_{28}	—	March 19, 2001	Socorro	LINEAR	·	1.8 km	MPC · JPL
51447	2001 FZ_{28}	—	March 19, 2001	Socorro	LINEAR	·	2.6 km	MPC · JPL
51448	2001 FD_{29}	—	March 19, 2001	Socorro	LINEAR	·	3.6 km	MPC · JPL
51449	2001 FH_{29}	—	March 19, 2001	Socorro	LINEAR	V	1.9 km	MPC · JPL
51450	2001 FS_{30}	—	March 21, 2001	Haleakala	NEAT	·	4.2 km	MPC · JPL
51451	2001 FE_{31}	—	March 22, 2001	Reedy Creek	J. Broughton	NYS	2.8 km	MPC · JPL
51452	2001 FO_{33}	—	March 18, 2001	Socorro	LINEAR	·	1.4 km	MPC · JPL
51453	2001 FU_{36}	—	March 18, 2001	Socorro	LINEAR	·	2.7 km	MPC · JPL
51454	2001 FX_{37}	—	March 18, 2001	Socorro	LINEAR	·	1.7 km	MPC · JPL
51455	2001 FC_{38}	—	March 18, 2001	Socorro	LINEAR	·	2.5 km	MPC · JPL
51456	2001 FX_{38}	—	March 18, 2001	Socorro	LINEAR	·	2.5 km	MPC · JPL
51457	2001 FP_{41}	—	March 18, 2001	Socorro	LINEAR	PHO	2.7 km	MPC · JPL
51458	2001 FL_{42}	—	March 18, 2001	Socorro	LINEAR	·	1.5 km	MPC · JPL
51459	2001 FC_{43}	—	March 18, 2001	Socorro	LINEAR	·	2.3 km	MPC · JPL
51460	2001 FQ_{43}	—	March 18, 2001	Socorro	LINEAR	·	1.7 km	MPC · JPL
51461	2001 FV_{43}	—	March 18, 2001	Socorro	LINEAR	NYS	2.6 km	MPC · JPL
51462	2001 FX_{43}	—	March 18, 2001	Socorro	LINEAR	·	1.5 km	MPC · JPL
51463	2001 FJ_{47}	—	March 18, 2001	Socorro	LINEAR	NYS	3.1 km	MPC · JPL
51464	2001 FY_{47}	—	March 18, 2001	Socorro	LINEAR	·	3.8 km	MPC · JPL
51465	2001 FZ_{47}	—	March 18, 2001	Socorro	LINEAR	·	1.9 km	MPC · JPL
51466	2001 FK_{48}	—	March 18, 2001	Socorro	LINEAR	·	7.0 km	MPC · JPL
51467	2001 FQ_{48}	—	March 18, 2001	Socorro	LINEAR	·	2.5 km	MPC · JPL
51468	2001 FD_{50}	—	March 18, 2001	Socorro	LINEAR	·	2.1 km	MPC · JPL
51469	2001 FB_{52}	—	March 18, 2001	Socorro	LINEAR	·	1.5 km	MPC · JPL
51470	2001 FC_{52}	—	March 18, 2001	Socorro	LINEAR	·	2.6 km	MPC · JPL
51471	2001 FB_{53}	—	March 18, 2001	Socorro	LINEAR	·	2.7 km	MPC · JPL
51472	2001 FU_{53}	—	March 18, 2001	Socorro	LINEAR	CLO	7.5 km	MPC · JPL
51473	2001 FW_{54}	—	March 19, 2001	Socorro	LINEAR	·	1.9 km	MPC · JPL
51474	2001 FG_{55}	—	March 21, 2001	Socorro	LINEAR	·	3.3 km	MPC · JPL
51475	2001 FQ_{55}	—	March 21, 2001	Socorro	LINEAR	·	3.6 km	MPC · JPL
51476	2001 FS_{55}	—	March 21, 2001	Socorro	LINEAR	PHO	4.7 km	MPC · JPL
51477	2001 FP_{57}	—	March 19, 2001	Socorro	LINEAR	·	2.1 km	MPC · JPL
51478	2001 FX_{60}	—	March 19, 2001	Socorro	LINEAR	V	1.9 km	MPC · JPL
51479	2001 FG_{65}	—	March 19, 2001	Socorro	LINEAR	·	2.0 km	MPC · JPL
51480	2001 FN_{67}	—	March 19, 2001	Socorro	LINEAR	·	2.0 km	MPC · JPL
51481	2001 FG_{70}	—	March 19, 2001	Socorro	LINEAR	(1338) (FLO)	2.0 km	MPC · JPL
51482	2001 FY_{70}	—	March 19, 2001	Socorro	LINEAR	·	2.1 km	MPC · JPL
51483	2001 FP_{71}	—	March 19, 2001	Socorro	LINEAR	·	3.4 km	MPC · JPL
51484	2001 FU_{72}	—	March 19, 2001	Socorro	LINEAR	·	1.6 km	MPC · JPL
51485	2001 FB_{73}	—	March 19, 2001	Socorro	LINEAR	V	2.0 km	MPC · JPL
51486	2001 FL_{73}	—	March 19, 2001	Socorro	LINEAR	·	3.0 km	MPC · JPL
51487	2001 FL_{74}	—	March 19, 2001	Socorro	LINEAR	·	2.3 km	MPC · JPL
51488	2001 FV_{75}	—	March 19, 2001	Socorro	LINEAR	MAR	3.6 km	MPC · JPL
51489	2001 FM_{76}	—	March 19, 2001	Socorro	LINEAR	V	1.7 km	MPC · JPL
51490	2001 FQ_{76}	—	March 19, 2001	Socorro	LINEAR	·	1.7 km	MPC · JPL
51491	2001 FS_{76}	—	March 19, 2001	Socorro	LINEAR	·	2.4 km	MPC · JPL
51492	2001 FK_{77}	—	March 19, 2001	Socorro	LINEAR	V	2.1 km	MPC · JPL
51493	2001 FE_{79}	—	March 19, 2001	Socorro	LINEAR	·	2.5 km	MPC · JPL
51494	2001 FG_{79}	—	March 19, 2001	Socorro	LINEAR	·	6.3 km	MPC · JPL
51495	2001 FO_{79}	—	March 21, 2001	Socorro	LINEAR	·	3.7 km	MPC · JPL
51496	2001 FT_{79}	—	March 21, 2001	Socorro	LINEAR	AEG	9.8 km	MPC · JPL
51497	2001 FB_{80}	—	March 21, 2001	Socorro	LINEAR	·	3.8 km	MPC · JPL
51498	2001 FW_{80}	—	March 21, 2001	Socorro	LINEAR	PHO	2.6 km	MPC · JPL
51499	2001 FF_{81}	—	March 23, 2001	Socorro	LINEAR	·	1.6 km	MPC · JPL
51500	2001 FE_{83}	—	March 24, 2001	Socorro	LINEAR	·	3.9 km	MPC · JPL

== 51501–51600 ==
back to top

Designation			Discovery			Properties		Ref
Permanent	Provisional	Named after	Date	Site	Discoverer(s)	Category	Diam.	Ref
51501	2001 FN_{86}	—	March 27, 2001	Desert Beaver	W. K. Y. Yeung	·	1.7 km	MPC · JPL
51502	2001 FR_{86}	—	March 21, 2001	Anderson Mesa	LONEOS	·	2.4 km	MPC · JPL
51503	2001 FA_{87}	—	March 21, 2001	Anderson Mesa	LONEOS	·	3.5 km	MPC · JPL
51504	2001 FN_{87}	—	March 21, 2001	Anderson Mesa	LONEOS	·	3.6 km	MPC · JPL
51505	2001 FE_{88}	—	March 27, 2001	Anderson Mesa	LONEOS	·	1.7 km	MPC · JPL
51506	2001 FE_{91}	—	March 26, 2001	Socorro	LINEAR	·	3.7 km	MPC · JPL
51507	2001 FV_{94}	—	March 16, 2001	Socorro	LINEAR	·	2.1 km	MPC · JPL
51508	2001 FM_{97}	—	March 16, 2001	Kitt Peak	Spacewatch	·	1.4 km	MPC · JPL
51509	2001 FP_{97}	—	March 16, 2001	Socorro	LINEAR	V	2.1 km	MPC · JPL
51510	2001 FE_{98}	—	March 16, 2001	Socorro	LINEAR	·	4.9 km	MPC · JPL
51511	2001 FP_{98}	—	March 16, 2001	Socorro	LINEAR	·	3.5 km	MPC · JPL
51512	2001 FG_{99}	—	March 16, 2001	Socorro	LINEAR	·	2.9 km	MPC · JPL
51513	2001 FY_{99}	—	March 16, 2001	Socorro	LINEAR	·	4.0 km	MPC · JPL
51514	2001 FP_{100}	—	March 17, 2001	Kitt Peak	Spacewatch	·	3.1 km	MPC · JPL
51515	2001 FS_{100}	—	March 17, 2001	Socorro	LINEAR	PHO	2.7 km	MPC · JPL
51516	2001 FG_{101}	—	March 17, 2001	Socorro	LINEAR	·	4.9 km	MPC · JPL
51517	2001 FH_{107}	—	March 18, 2001	Anderson Mesa	LONEOS	·	2.1 km	MPC · JPL
51518	2001 FN_{108}	—	March 18, 2001	Socorro	LINEAR	·	3.0 km	MPC · JPL
51519	2001 FT_{109}	—	March 18, 2001	Socorro	LINEAR	fast?	2.0 km	MPC · JPL
51520	2001 FL_{112}	—	March 18, 2001	Haleakala	NEAT	·	5.0 km	MPC · JPL
51521	2001 FJ_{113}	—	March 18, 2001	Haleakala	NEAT	·	2.8 km	MPC · JPL
51522	2001 FZ_{117}	—	March 19, 2001	Socorro	LINEAR	·	3.3 km	MPC · JPL
51523	2001 FJ_{120}	—	March 24, 2001	Socorro	LINEAR	·	1.9 km	MPC · JPL
51524	2001 FJ_{121}	—	March 28, 2001	Socorro	LINEAR	·	2.4 km	MPC · JPL
51525	2001 FZ_{121}	—	March 29, 2001	Desert Beaver	W. K. Y. Yeung	·	3.2 km	MPC · JPL
51526	2001 FF_{123}	—	March 23, 2001	Anderson Mesa	LONEOS	·	2.0 km	MPC · JPL
51527	2001 FO_{123}	—	March 23, 2001	Anderson Mesa	LONEOS	·	4.3 km	MPC · JPL
51528	2001 FP_{123}	—	March 23, 2001	Anderson Mesa	LONEOS	·	2.3 km	MPC · JPL
51529 Marksimpson	2001 FB_{128}	Marksimpson	March 31, 2001	Desert Beaver	W. K. Y. Yeung	·	6.3 km	MPC · JPL
51530	2001 FL_{129}	—	March 28, 2001	Socorro	LINEAR	·	1.9 km	MPC · JPL
51531	2001 FS_{129}	—	March 28, 2001	Socorro	LINEAR	·	2.8 km	MPC · JPL
51532	2001 FN_{130}	—	March 31, 2001	Desert Beaver	W. K. Y. Yeung	·	6.5 km	MPC · JPL
51533	2001 FF_{132}	—	March 20, 2001	Kitt Peak	Spacewatch	·	3.0 km	MPC · JPL
51534	2001 FQ_{132}	—	March 20, 2001	Haleakala	NEAT	·	2.3 km	MPC · JPL
51535	2001 FD_{133}	—	March 20, 2001	Haleakala	NEAT	V	1.5 km	MPC · JPL
51536	2001 FN_{133}	—	March 20, 2001	Haleakala	NEAT	·	2.0 km	MPC · JPL
51537	2001 FT_{133}	—	March 20, 2001	Haleakala	NEAT	(11097)	4.5 km	MPC · JPL
51538	2001 FA_{143}	—	March 23, 2001	Haleakala	NEAT	·	5.4 km	MPC · JPL
51539	2001 FG_{143}	—	March 23, 2001	Anderson Mesa	LONEOS	·	4.6 km	MPC · JPL
51540	2001 FQ_{143}	—	March 23, 2001	Anderson Mesa	LONEOS	·	2.0 km	MPC · JPL
51541	2001 FB_{145}	—	March 23, 2001	Haleakala	NEAT	H	1.6 km	MPC · JPL
51542	2001 FA_{147}	—	March 24, 2001	Anderson Mesa	LONEOS	·	2.6 km	MPC · JPL
51543	2001 FJ_{150}	—	March 24, 2001	Anderson Mesa	LONEOS	·	3.0 km	MPC · JPL
51544	2001 FH_{151}	—	March 24, 2001	Socorro	LINEAR	V	1.5 km	MPC · JPL
51545	2001 FM_{158}	—	March 27, 2001	Haleakala	NEAT	MAS	2.4 km	MPC · JPL
51546	2001 FU_{159}	—	March 29, 2001	Anderson Mesa	LONEOS	V	1.4 km	MPC · JPL
51547	2001 FX_{159}	—	March 29, 2001	Anderson Mesa	LONEOS	·	1.3 km	MPC · JPL
51548	2001 FD_{160}	—	March 29, 2001	Anderson Mesa	LONEOS	·	1.5 km	MPC · JPL
51549	2001 FM_{161}	—	March 29, 2001	Haleakala	NEAT	·	2.2 km	MPC · JPL
51550	2001 FB_{162}	—	March 30, 2001	Socorro	LINEAR	·	5.4 km	MPC · JPL
51551	2001 FO_{164}	—	March 18, 2001	Socorro	LINEAR	·	2.3 km	MPC · JPL
51552	2001 FP_{164}	—	March 18, 2001	Socorro	LINEAR	·	3.5 km	MPC · JPL
51553	2001 FR_{164}	—	March 18, 2001	Socorro	LINEAR	·	2.9 km	MPC · JPL
51554	2001 FS_{164}	—	March 18, 2001	Socorro	LINEAR	PHO	3.0 km	MPC · JPL
51555	2001 FK_{165}	—	March 19, 2001	Anderson Mesa	LONEOS	·	2.6 km	MPC · JPL
51556	2001 FG_{171}	—	March 24, 2001	Socorro	LINEAR	·	8.5 km	MPC · JPL
51557	2001 FL_{176}	—	March 16, 2001	Socorro	LINEAR	·	8.3 km	MPC · JPL
51558	2001 GE_{5}	—	April 15, 2001	Socorro	LINEAR	·	3.2 km	MPC · JPL
51559	2001 GZ_{6}	—	April 15, 2001	Socorro	LINEAR	·	1.8 km	MPC · JPL
51560	2001 GF_{8}	—	April 15, 2001	Socorro	LINEAR	·	1.6 km	MPC · JPL
51561	2001 GG_{9}	—	April 15, 2001	Socorro	LINEAR	·	3.8 km	MPC · JPL
51562	2001 GP_{9}	—	April 15, 2001	Socorro	LINEAR	·	3.0 km	MPC · JPL
51563	2001 HK	—	April 16, 2001	Socorro	LINEAR	NYS	3.4 km	MPC · JPL
51564	2001 HZ	—	April 16, 2001	Socorro	LINEAR	MAS	1.9 km	MPC · JPL
51565	2001 HQ_{1}	—	April 17, 2001	Socorro	LINEAR	·	2.9 km	MPC · JPL
51566	2001 HX_{1}	—	April 17, 2001	Socorro	LINEAR	·	2.1 km	MPC · JPL
51567	2001 HY_{1}	—	April 17, 2001	Socorro	LINEAR	·	3.7 km	MPC · JPL
51568	2001 HJ_{3}	—	April 17, 2001	Socorro	LINEAR	·	2.7 km	MPC · JPL
51569 Garywessen	2001 HV_{3}	Garywessen	April 18, 2001	Farpoint	G. Hug	EUN	4.5 km	MPC · JPL
51570 Phendricksen	2001 HE_{4}	Phendricksen	April 17, 2001	Badlands	Dyvig, R.	·	3.2 km	MPC · JPL
51571	2001 HF_{4}	—	April 19, 2001	Reedy Creek	J. Broughton	·	2.0 km	MPC · JPL
51572	2001 HV_{4}	—	April 16, 2001	Socorro	LINEAR	V	1.8 km	MPC · JPL
51573	2001 HX_{4}	—	April 16, 2001	Socorro	LINEAR	·	3.3 km	MPC · JPL
51574	2001 HA_{5}	—	April 16, 2001	Socorro	LINEAR	·	2.3 km	MPC · JPL
51575	2001 HU_{5}	—	April 18, 2001	Socorro	LINEAR	·	3.0 km	MPC · JPL
51576	2001 HW_{5}	—	April 18, 2001	Socorro	LINEAR	JUN	4.1 km	MPC · JPL
51577	2001 HX_{5}	—	April 18, 2001	Socorro	LINEAR	·	2.5 km	MPC · JPL
51578	2001 HX_{6}	—	April 18, 2001	Kitt Peak	Spacewatch	·	2.4 km	MPC · JPL
51579	2001 HY_{8}	—	April 16, 2001	Socorro	LINEAR	THM	6.0 km	MPC · JPL
51580	2001 HA_{9}	—	April 16, 2001	Socorro	LINEAR	·	2.3 km	MPC · JPL
51581	2001 HL_{9}	—	April 16, 2001	Socorro	LINEAR	·	3.6 km	MPC · JPL
51582	2001 HU_{9}	—	April 16, 2001	Socorro	LINEAR	·	3.6 km	MPC · JPL
51583	2001 HZ_{9}	—	April 16, 2001	Socorro	LINEAR	·	4.6 km	MPC · JPL
51584	2001 HP_{10}	—	April 16, 2001	Socorro	LINEAR	V	2.1 km	MPC · JPL
51585	2001 HH_{12}	—	April 18, 2001	Socorro	LINEAR	·	2.0 km	MPC · JPL
51586	2001 HO_{12}	—	April 18, 2001	Socorro	LINEAR	NYS	2.9 km	MPC · JPL
51587	2001 HY_{12}	—	April 18, 2001	Socorro	LINEAR	·	2.6 km	MPC · JPL
51588	2001 HH_{13}	—	April 18, 2001	Socorro	LINEAR	·	2.7 km	MPC · JPL
51589	2001 HQ_{13}	—	April 21, 2001	Socorro	LINEAR	EUN	4.5 km	MPC · JPL
51590	2001 HF_{14}	—	April 23, 2001	Reedy Creek	J. Broughton	NYS ·	2.3 km	MPC · JPL
51591	2001 HN_{15}	—	April 17, 2001	Socorro	LINEAR	·	3.4 km	MPC · JPL
51592	2001 HO_{18}	—	April 23, 2001	Socorro	LINEAR	·	2.5 km	MPC · JPL
51593	2001 HO_{20}	—	April 21, 2001	Socorro	LINEAR	·	3.5 km	MPC · JPL
51594	2001 HR_{20}	—	April 21, 2001	Socorro	LINEAR	·	2.7 km	MPC · JPL
51595	2001 HM_{21}	—	April 23, 2001	Socorro	LINEAR	·	2.3 km	MPC · JPL
51596	2001 HU_{21}	—	April 23, 2001	Socorro	LINEAR	MIS	3.6 km	MPC · JPL
51597	2001 HZ_{22}	—	April 16, 2001	Haleakala	NEAT	·	2.9 km	MPC · JPL
51598	2001 HK_{24}	—	April 27, 2001	Kitt Peak	Spacewatch	·	4.0 km	MPC · JPL
51599 Brittany	2001 HR_{24}	Brittany	April 28, 2001	Emerald Lane	L. Ball	·	2.0 km	MPC · JPL
51600	2001 HG_{27}	—	April 27, 2001	Socorro	LINEAR	MIS	5.0 km	MPC · JPL

== 51601–51700 ==
back to top

Designation			Discovery			Properties		Ref
Permanent	Provisional	Named after	Date	Site	Discoverer(s)	Category	Diam.	Ref
51601	2001 HW_{27}	—	April 27, 2001	Socorro	LINEAR	·	3.5 km	MPC · JPL
51602	2001 HL_{28}	—	April 27, 2001	Socorro	LINEAR	(3460)	6.6 km	MPC · JPL
51603	2001 HU_{28}	—	April 27, 2001	Socorro	LINEAR	·	2.7 km	MPC · JPL
51604	2001 HY_{28}	—	April 27, 2001	Socorro	LINEAR	·	10 km	MPC · JPL
51605	2001 HD_{29}	—	April 27, 2001	Socorro	LINEAR	MIS	6.1 km	MPC · JPL
51606	2001 HK_{29}	—	April 27, 2001	Socorro	LINEAR	·	2.6 km	MPC · JPL
51607	2001 HO_{29}	—	April 27, 2001	Socorro	LINEAR	·	4.6 km	MPC · JPL
51608	2001 HF_{32}	—	April 24, 2001	Socorro	LINEAR	·	2.5 km	MPC · JPL
51609	2001 HZ_{32}	—	April 27, 2001	Socorro	LINEAR	·	2.0 km	MPC · JPL
51610	2001 HH_{33}	—	April 27, 2001	Socorro	LINEAR	NYS	2.7 km	MPC · JPL
51611	2001 HQ_{33}	—	April 27, 2001	Socorro	LINEAR	·	2.3 km	MPC · JPL
51612	2001 HT_{33}	—	April 27, 2001	Socorro	LINEAR	HYG	7.7 km	MPC · JPL
51613	2001 HS_{34}	—	April 27, 2001	Socorro	LINEAR	·	2.3 km	MPC · JPL
51614	2001 HD_{35}	—	April 27, 2001	Socorro	LINEAR	·	2.6 km	MPC · JPL
51615	2001 HE_{35}	—	April 27, 2001	Socorro	LINEAR	·	2.5 km	MPC · JPL
51616	2001 HL_{35}	—	April 29, 2001	Socorro	LINEAR	EUN	3.5 km	MPC · JPL
51617	2001 HU_{35}	—	April 29, 2001	Socorro	LINEAR	·	2.3 km	MPC · JPL
51618	2001 HV_{35}	—	April 29, 2001	Socorro	LINEAR	·	2.9 km	MPC · JPL
51619	2001 HE_{36}	—	April 29, 2001	Socorro	LINEAR	·	2.5 km	MPC · JPL
51620	2001 HQ_{36}	—	April 29, 2001	Socorro	LINEAR	·	2.0 km	MPC · JPL
51621	2001 HR_{36}	—	April 29, 2001	Socorro	LINEAR	·	3.6 km	MPC · JPL
51622	2001 HA_{37}	—	April 29, 2001	Socorro	LINEAR	·	5.6 km	MPC · JPL
51623	2001 HJ_{37}	—	April 29, 2001	Socorro	LINEAR	·	3.7 km	MPC · JPL
51624	2001 HT_{37}	—	April 29, 2001	Socorro	LINEAR	·	4.1 km	MPC · JPL
51625	2001 HX_{37}	—	April 29, 2001	Črni Vrh	Matičič, S.	V	1.7 km	MPC · JPL
51626	2001 HJ_{38}	—	April 30, 2001	Desert Beaver	W. K. Y. Yeung	·	2.5 km	MPC · JPL
51627	2001 HK_{38}	—	April 30, 2001	Desert Beaver	W. K. Y. Yeung	GEF ·	9.6 km	MPC · JPL
51628	2001 HC_{42}	—	April 16, 2001	Socorro	LINEAR	V	2.0 km	MPC · JPL
51629	2001 HM_{43}	—	April 16, 2001	Anderson Mesa	LONEOS	V	1.6 km	MPC · JPL
51630	2001 HL_{44}	—	April 16, 2001	Socorro	LINEAR	·	2.6 km	MPC · JPL
51631	2001 HN_{46}	—	April 18, 2001	Socorro	LINEAR	NYS	2.7 km	MPC · JPL
51632	2001 HT_{46}	—	April 18, 2001	Socorro	LINEAR	·	7.2 km	MPC · JPL
51633	2001 HX_{46}	—	April 18, 2001	Socorro	LINEAR	·	2.7 km	MPC · JPL
51634	2001 HU_{47}	—	April 19, 2001	Haleakala	NEAT	H	1.6 km	MPC · JPL
51635	2001 HA_{48}	—	April 21, 2001	Socorro	LINEAR	·	2.2 km	MPC · JPL
51636	2001 HM_{49}	—	April 21, 2001	Socorro	LINEAR	·	2.2 km	MPC · JPL
51637	2001 HP_{49}	—	April 21, 2001	Socorro	LINEAR	PHO	2.6 km	MPC · JPL
51638	2001 HF_{53}	—	April 23, 2001	Socorro	LINEAR	·	3.1 km	MPC · JPL
51639	2001 HH_{53}	—	April 23, 2001	Socorro	LINEAR	MRX	3.1 km	MPC · JPL
51640	2001 HP_{54}	—	April 24, 2001	Socorro	LINEAR	V	1.4 km	MPC · JPL
51641	2001 HY_{54}	—	April 24, 2001	Socorro	LINEAR	·	2.3 km	MPC · JPL
51642	2001 HG_{55}	—	April 24, 2001	Socorro	LINEAR	·	11 km	MPC · JPL
51643	2001 HT_{56}	—	April 24, 2001	Haleakala	NEAT	·	2.1 km	MPC · JPL
51644	2001 HD_{60}	—	April 23, 2001	Socorro	LINEAR	·	3.5 km	MPC · JPL
51645	2001 HP_{60}	—	April 24, 2001	Anderson Mesa	LONEOS	·	2.9 km	MPC · JPL
51646	2001 HA_{62}	—	April 26, 2001	Anderson Mesa	LONEOS	·	2.0 km	MPC · JPL
51647	2001 HY_{62}	—	April 26, 2001	Anderson Mesa	LONEOS	·	2.9 km	MPC · JPL
51648	2001 HN_{63}	—	April 26, 2001	Anderson Mesa	LONEOS	·	2.7 km	MPC · JPL
51649	2001 HB_{64}	—	April 27, 2001	Socorro	LINEAR	MAS	1.6 km	MPC · JPL
51650	2001 HG_{64}	—	April 27, 2001	Socorro	LINEAR	·	3.4 km	MPC · JPL
51651	2001 HC_{65}	—	April 28, 2001	Kitt Peak	Spacewatch	·	2.9 km	MPC · JPL
51652	2001 HH_{65}	—	April 29, 2001	Socorro	LINEAR	·	2.9 km	MPC · JPL
51653	2001 HW_{65}	—	April 30, 2001	Socorro	LINEAR	V	1.7 km	MPC · JPL
51654	2001 HK_{66}	—	April 24, 2001	Socorro	LINEAR	MAR	2.1 km	MPC · JPL
51655 Susannemond	2001 JA	Susannemond	May 1, 2001	Kanab	Sheridan, E. E.	·	3.4 km	MPC · JPL
51656	2001 JD	—	May 1, 2001	Desert Beaver	W. K. Y. Yeung	EUN	4.4 km	MPC · JPL
51657	2001 JG	—	May 2, 2001	Palomar	NEAT	·	4.5 km	MPC · JPL
51658	2001 JJ_{1}	—	May 2, 2001	Kitt Peak	Spacewatch	·	4.5 km	MPC · JPL
51659 Robohachi	2001 JN_{1}	Robohachi	May 14, 2001	Bisei SG Center	BATTeRS	·	3.6 km	MPC · JPL
51660	2001 JX_{2}	—	May 12, 2001	Haleakala	NEAT	V	2.3 km	MPC · JPL
51661	2001 JO_{6}	—	May 14, 2001	Palomar	NEAT	·	3.8 km	MPC · JPL
51662	2001 JZ_{6}	—	May 15, 2001	Anderson Mesa	LONEOS	·	2.8 km	MPC · JPL
51663 Lovelock	2001 JL_{7}	Lovelock	May 15, 2001	Anderson Mesa	LONEOS	·	1.4 km	MPC · JPL
51664	2001 JB_{9}	—	May 15, 2001	Haleakala	NEAT	·	5.3 km	MPC · JPL
51665	2001 JN_{10}	—	May 15, 2001	Anderson Mesa	LONEOS	GEF	3.6 km	MPC · JPL
51666	2001 KJ_{1}	—	May 17, 2001	Socorro	LINEAR	EUN	2.6 km	MPC · JPL
51667	2001 KH_{3}	—	May 17, 2001	Socorro	LINEAR	(5)	2.2 km	MPC · JPL
51668	2001 KL_{4}	—	May 17, 2001	Socorro	LINEAR	AGN	4.1 km	MPC · JPL
51669	2001 KQ_{4}	—	May 17, 2001	Socorro	LINEAR	·	8.1 km	MPC · JPL
51670	2001 KF_{5}	—	May 17, 2001	Socorro	LINEAR	·	2.7 km	MPC · JPL
51671	2001 KP_{6}	—	May 17, 2001	Socorro	LINEAR	NYS	2.7 km	MPC · JPL
51672	2001 KW_{6}	—	May 17, 2001	Socorro	LINEAR	PAD	6.8 km	MPC · JPL
51673	2001 KC_{7}	—	May 17, 2001	Socorro	LINEAR	·	5.2 km	MPC · JPL
51674	2001 KE_{7}	—	May 17, 2001	Socorro	LINEAR	·	3.8 km	MPC · JPL
51675	2001 KS_{7}	—	May 18, 2001	Socorro	LINEAR	·	2.1 km	MPC · JPL
51676	2001 KJ_{8}	—	May 18, 2001	Socorro	LINEAR	·	2.2 km	MPC · JPL
51677	2001 KN_{8}	—	May 18, 2001	Socorro	LINEAR	(5)	2.9 km	MPC · JPL
51678	2001 KR_{8}	—	May 18, 2001	Socorro	LINEAR	·	2.5 km	MPC · JPL
51679	2001 KY_{8}	—	May 18, 2001	Socorro	LINEAR	·	5.5 km	MPC · JPL
51680	2001 KF_{9}	—	May 18, 2001	Socorro	LINEAR	·	3.5 km	MPC · JPL
51681	2001 KO_{9}	—	May 18, 2001	Socorro	LINEAR	·	2.8 km	MPC · JPL
51682	2001 KM_{10}	—	May 18, 2001	Socorro	LINEAR	·	5.6 km	MPC · JPL
51683	2001 KT_{10}	—	May 18, 2001	Socorro	LINEAR	·	6.3 km	MPC · JPL
51684	2001 KU_{10}	—	May 18, 2001	Socorro	LINEAR	ADE	8.1 km	MPC · JPL
51685	2001 KQ_{11}	—	May 18, 2001	Socorro	LINEAR	·	4.5 km	MPC · JPL
51686	2001 KF_{12}	—	May 18, 2001	Socorro	LINEAR	TIR	8.0 km	MPC · JPL
51687	2001 KP_{12}	—	May 18, 2001	Socorro	LINEAR	V	2.6 km	MPC · JPL
51688	2001 KW_{12}	—	May 18, 2001	Socorro	LINEAR	·	3.4 km	MPC · JPL
51689	2001 KN_{13}	—	May 18, 2001	Socorro	LINEAR	EUN	4.4 km	MPC · JPL
51690	2001 KS_{13}	—	May 20, 2001	Socorro	LINEAR	ERI	4.4 km	MPC · JPL
51691	2001 KT_{13}	—	May 17, 2001	Socorro	LINEAR	MIS	5.7 km	MPC · JPL
51692	2001 KY_{13}	—	May 17, 2001	Socorro	LINEAR	·	2.6 km	MPC · JPL
51693	2001 KS_{14}	—	May 18, 2001	Socorro	LINEAR	·	2.1 km	MPC · JPL
51694	2001 KX_{14}	—	May 18, 2001	Socorro	LINEAR	·	7.0 km	MPC · JPL
51695	2001 KQ_{16}	—	May 18, 2001	Socorro	LINEAR	RAF	3.5 km	MPC · JPL
51696	2001 KD_{17}	—	May 18, 2001	Socorro	LINEAR	·	2.8 km	MPC · JPL
51697	2001 KG_{17}	—	May 18, 2001	Socorro	LINEAR	·	3.6 km	MPC · JPL
51698	2001 KQ_{20}	—	May 17, 2001	Kitt Peak	Spacewatch	V	2.0 km	MPC · JPL
51699	2001 KA_{21}	—	May 21, 2001	Anderson Mesa	LONEOS	·	3.2 km	MPC · JPL
51700	2001 KV_{23}	—	May 17, 2001	Socorro	LINEAR	·	4.3 km	MPC · JPL

== 51701–51800 ==
back to top

Designation			Discovery			Properties		Ref
Permanent	Provisional	Named after	Date	Site	Discoverer(s)	Category	Diam.	Ref
51701	2001 KZ_{23}	—	May 17, 2001	Socorro	LINEAR	·	2.3 km	MPC · JPL
51702	2001 KK_{24}	—	May 17, 2001	Socorro	LINEAR	V	2.0 km	MPC · JPL
51703	2001 KM_{24}	—	May 17, 2001	Socorro	LINEAR	(5)	2.3 km	MPC · JPL
51704	2001 KO_{26}	—	May 17, 2001	Socorro	LINEAR	·	4.5 km	MPC · JPL
51705	2001 KA_{27}	—	May 17, 2001	Socorro	LINEAR	EOS	5.0 km	MPC · JPL
51706	2001 KX_{27}	—	May 17, 2001	Socorro	LINEAR	·	2.0 km	MPC · JPL
51707	2001 KR_{28}	—	May 21, 2001	Socorro	LINEAR	·	5.8 km	MPC · JPL
51708	2001 KU_{28}	—	May 21, 2001	Socorro	LINEAR	·	2.1 km	MPC · JPL
51709	2001 KW_{28}	—	May 21, 2001	Socorro	LINEAR	NYS	2.4 km	MPC · JPL
51710	2001 KZ_{28}	—	May 21, 2001	Socorro	LINEAR	·	2.7 km	MPC · JPL
51711	2001 KH_{29}	—	May 21, 2001	Socorro	LINEAR	·	2.3 km	MPC · JPL
51712	2001 KO_{29}	—	May 21, 2001	Socorro	LINEAR	·	3.7 km	MPC · JPL
51713	2001 KC_{30}	—	May 21, 2001	Socorro	LINEAR	·	2.0 km	MPC · JPL
51714	2001 KG_{30}	—	May 21, 2001	Socorro	LINEAR	·	7.3 km	MPC · JPL
51715	2001 KB_{31}	—	May 21, 2001	Socorro	LINEAR	·	2.8 km	MPC · JPL
51716	2001 KF_{31}	—	May 22, 2001	Socorro	LINEAR	PHO	4.1 km	MPC · JPL
51717	2001 KJ_{31}	—	May 22, 2001	Socorro	LINEAR	EUN	2.8 km	MPC · JPL
51718	2001 KL_{34}	—	May 18, 2001	Socorro	LINEAR	·	4.8 km	MPC · JPL
51719	2001 KH_{36}	—	May 18, 2001	Socorro	LINEAR	·	2.7 km	MPC · JPL
51720	2001 KZ_{36}	—	May 21, 2001	Socorro	LINEAR	slow	6.3 km	MPC · JPL
51721	2001 KY_{37}	—	May 22, 2001	Socorro	LINEAR	·	5.0 km	MPC · JPL
51722	2001 KF_{38}	—	May 22, 2001	Socorro	LINEAR	·	3.8 km	MPC · JPL
51723	2001 KN_{38}	—	May 22, 2001	Socorro	LINEAR	EUN	2.6 km	MPC · JPL
51724	2001 KJ_{39}	—	May 22, 2001	Socorro	LINEAR	·	3.0 km	MPC · JPL
51725	2001 KV_{39}	—	May 22, 2001	Socorro	LINEAR	·	6.8 km	MPC · JPL
51726	2001 KV_{40}	—	May 23, 2001	Socorro	LINEAR	·	4.4 km	MPC · JPL
51727	2001 KV_{41}	—	May 24, 2001	Palomar	NEAT	GEF	3.7 km	MPC · JPL
51728	2001 KQ_{42}	—	May 22, 2001	Socorro	LINEAR	·	2.1 km	MPC · JPL
51729	2001 KA_{44}	—	May 22, 2001	Socorro	LINEAR	·	8.8 km	MPC · JPL
51730	2001 KC_{45}	—	May 22, 2001	Socorro	LINEAR	ADE	5.4 km	MPC · JPL
51731	2001 KF_{45}	—	May 22, 2001	Socorro	LINEAR	·	2.1 km	MPC · JPL
51732	2001 KQ_{45}	—	May 22, 2001	Socorro	LINEAR	ADE	7.7 km	MPC · JPL
51733	2001 KZ_{45}	—	May 22, 2001	Socorro	LINEAR	PHO	5.0 km	MPC · JPL
51734	2001 KX_{46}	—	May 22, 2001	Socorro	LINEAR	EUN	3.6 km	MPC · JPL
51735	2001 KL_{47}	—	May 24, 2001	Socorro	LINEAR	·	2.7 km	MPC · JPL
51736	2001 KA_{48}	—	May 24, 2001	Socorro	LINEAR	·	4.4 km	MPC · JPL
51737	2001 KD_{48}	—	May 24, 2001	Socorro	LINEAR	·	2.3 km	MPC · JPL
51738	2001 KQ_{48}	—	May 24, 2001	Socorro	LINEAR	·	3.0 km	MPC · JPL
51739	2001 KQ_{49}	—	May 24, 2001	Socorro	LINEAR	NYS	3.5 km	MPC · JPL
51740	2001 KG_{50}	—	May 24, 2001	Socorro	LINEAR	EUN	3.0 km	MPC · JPL
51741 Davidixon	2001 KQ_{50}	Davidixon	May 24, 2001	Anza	M. Collins, White, M.	·	7.4 km	MPC · JPL
51742	2001 KE_{55}	—	May 22, 2001	Socorro	LINEAR	·	3.3 km	MPC · JPL
51743	2001 KK_{55}	—	May 22, 2001	Socorro	LINEAR	·	3.3 km	MPC · JPL
51744	2001 KP_{56}	—	May 23, 2001	Socorro	LINEAR	·	3.0 km	MPC · JPL
51745	2001 KS_{58}	—	May 26, 2001	Socorro	LINEAR	·	5.0 km	MPC · JPL
51746	2001 KM_{62}	—	May 18, 2001	Kitt Peak	Spacewatch	·	4.1 km	MPC · JPL
51747	2001 KR_{63}	—	May 20, 2001	Haleakala	NEAT	PHO	2.2 km	MPC · JPL
51748	2001 KC_{64}	—	May 21, 2001	Socorro	LINEAR	·	4.2 km	MPC · JPL
51749	2001 KF_{65}	—	May 22, 2001	Anderson Mesa	LONEOS	MAR	3.5 km	MPC · JPL
51750	2001 KL_{66}	—	May 22, 2001	Socorro	LINEAR	·	1.9 km	MPC · JPL
51751	2001 KQ_{66}	—	May 23, 2001	Haleakala	NEAT	·	11 km	MPC · JPL
51752	2001 KW_{68}	—	May 21, 2001	Socorro	LINEAR	·	2.3 km	MPC · JPL
51753	2001 KV_{71}	—	May 24, 2001	Socorro	LINEAR	·	3.1 km	MPC · JPL
51754	2001 KT_{73}	—	May 24, 2001	Kitt Peak	Spacewatch	·	2.6 km	MPC · JPL
51755	2001 LC_{3}	—	June 13, 2001	Socorro	LINEAR	·	9.9 km	MPC · JPL
51756	2001 LO_{3}	—	June 13, 2001	Socorro	LINEAR	·	3.0 km	MPC · JPL
51757	2001 LA_{4}	—	June 13, 2001	Socorro	LINEAR	·	5.7 km	MPC · JPL
51758	2001 LL_{4}	—	June 13, 2001	Socorro	LINEAR	·	3.0 km	MPC · JPL
51759	2001 LO_{6}	—	June 14, 2001	Palomar	NEAT	·	2.6 km	MPC · JPL
51760	2001 LC_{7}	—	June 15, 2001	Socorro	LINEAR	·	11 km	MPC · JPL
51761	2001 LD_{7}	—	June 15, 2001	Socorro	LINEAR	·	15 km	MPC · JPL
51762	2001 LV_{7}	—	June 15, 2001	Palomar	NEAT	MAR	3.0 km	MPC · JPL
51763	2001 LD_{8}	—	June 15, 2001	Palomar	NEAT	CYB	11 km	MPC · JPL
51764	2001 LR_{8}	—	June 15, 2001	Palomar	NEAT	LIX	11 km	MPC · JPL
51765	2001 LT_{10}	—	June 15, 2001	Socorro	LINEAR	MAR	3.2 km	MPC · JPL
51766	2001 LH_{12}	—	June 15, 2001	Socorro	LINEAR	·	5.8 km	MPC · JPL
51767	2001 LH_{15}	—	June 11, 2001	Kitt Peak	Spacewatch	EOS	6.1 km	MPC · JPL
51768	2001 LQ_{16}	—	June 14, 2001	Kitt Peak	Spacewatch	·	3.6 km	MPC · JPL
51769	2001 LS_{18}	—	June 15, 2001	Socorro	LINEAR	·	8.0 km	MPC · JPL
51770	2001 LH_{19}	—	June 15, 2001	Socorro	LINEAR	·	3.6 km	MPC · JPL
51771	2001 MH	—	June 16, 2001	Desert Beaver	W. K. Y. Yeung	·	5.5 km	MPC · JPL
51772 Sparker	2001 MJ	Sparker	June 16, 2001	Badlands	Dyvig, R.	EUN	4.2 km	MPC · JPL
51773	2001 MV	—	June 16, 2001	Socorro	LINEAR	PHO	3.3 km	MPC · JPL
51774	2001 MH_{1}	—	June 16, 2001	Palomar	NEAT	ADE	6.5 km	MPC · JPL
51775	2001 MZ_{2}	—	June 16, 2001	Palomar	NEAT	·	15 km	MPC · JPL
51776	2001 MT_{3}	—	June 16, 2001	Socorro	LINEAR	·	2.4 km	MPC · JPL
51777	2001 MG_{8}	—	June 20, 2001	Haleakala	NEAT	slow	10 km	MPC · JPL
51778	2001 MV_{8}	—	June 17, 2001	Palomar	NEAT	EUN · fast	3.9 km	MPC · JPL
51779	2001 MY_{8}	—	June 19, 2001	Palomar	NEAT	KOR	3.3 km	MPC · JPL
51780	2001 MB_{9}	—	June 20, 2001	Palomar	NEAT	EOS	4.9 km	MPC · JPL
51781	2001 MU_{9}	—	June 22, 2001	Palomar	NEAT	MAR	3.0 km	MPC · JPL
51782	2001 MC_{12}	—	June 21, 2001	Palomar	NEAT	·	5.2 km	MPC · JPL
51783	2001 MO_{12}	—	June 21, 2001	Palomar	NEAT	·	4.6 km	MPC · JPL
51784	2001 MJ_{15}	—	June 23, 2001	Palomar	NEAT	·	8.2 km	MPC · JPL
51785	2001 MG_{17}	—	June 27, 2001	Palomar	NEAT	·	5.9 km	MPC · JPL
51786	2001 MY_{18}	—	June 29, 2001	Anderson Mesa	LONEOS	·	14 km	MPC · JPL
51787	2001 MP_{19}	—	June 22, 2001	Palomar	NEAT	·	4.2 km	MPC · JPL
51788	2001 ME_{21}	—	June 26, 2001	Palomar	NEAT	KOR	3.0 km	MPC · JPL
51789	2001 MG_{21}	—	June 26, 2001	Palomar	NEAT	·	6.6 km	MPC · JPL
51790	2001 MG_{23}	—	June 27, 2001	Haleakala	NEAT	·	17 km	MPC · JPL
51791	2001 MD_{24}	—	June 27, 2001	Haleakala	NEAT	MAR	4.2 km	MPC · JPL
51792	2001 MD_{25}	—	June 17, 2001	Anderson Mesa	LONEOS	·	5.9 km	MPC · JPL
51793	2001 MK_{25}	—	June 17, 2001	Anderson Mesa	LONEOS	·	5.6 km	MPC · JPL
51794	2001 MC_{26}	—	June 19, 2001	Haleakala	NEAT	EUN	4.0 km	MPC · JPL
51795	2001 MR_{26}	—	June 19, 2001	Haleakala	NEAT	·	2.9 km	MPC · JPL
51796	2001 MJ_{27}	—	June 20, 2001	Anderson Mesa	LONEOS	·	9.2 km	MPC · JPL
51797	2001 MM_{27}	—	June 20, 2001	Anderson Mesa	LONEOS	·	7.8 km	MPC · JPL
51798	2001 MA_{28}	—	June 23, 2001	Palomar	NEAT	·	6.0 km	MPC · JPL
51799	2001 MF_{29}	—	June 27, 2001	Anderson Mesa	LONEOS	·	5.3 km	MPC · JPL
51800	2001 NN_{2}	—	July 13, 2001	Palomar	NEAT	·	4.6 km	MPC · JPL

== 51801–51900 ==
back to top

Designation			Discovery			Properties		Ref
Permanent	Provisional	Named after	Date	Site	Discoverer(s)	Category	Diam.	Ref
51801	2001 NZ_{2}	—	July 12, 2001	Palomar	NEAT	URS · slow	9.9 km	MPC · JPL
51802	2001 NF_{4}	—	July 13, 2001	Palomar	NEAT	EUN	3.2 km	MPC · JPL
51803	2001 NN_{7}	—	July 13, 2001	Palomar	NEAT	·	3.8 km	MPC · JPL
51804	2001 NP_{8}	—	July 14, 2001	Palomar	NEAT	THM	5.4 km	MPC · JPL
51805	2001 NY_{12}	—	July 14, 2001	Haleakala	NEAT	·	3.4 km	MPC · JPL
51806	2001 NN_{18}	—	July 12, 2001	Haleakala	NEAT	EOS	5.1 km	MPC · JPL
51807	2001 NX_{19}	—	July 12, 2001	Haleakala	NEAT	fast	4.2 km	MPC · JPL
51808	2001 OM_{1}	—	July 18, 2001	Palomar	NEAT	·	6.7 km	MPC · JPL
51809	2001 OQ_{1}	—	July 18, 2001	Palomar	NEAT	EOS	4.2 km	MPC · JPL
51810	2001 ON_{5}	—	July 17, 2001	Anderson Mesa	LONEOS	EOS	5.0 km	MPC · JPL
51811	2001 OP_{5}	—	July 17, 2001	Anderson Mesa	LONEOS	·	10 km	MPC · JPL
51812	2001 OE_{7}	—	July 17, 2001	Anderson Mesa	LONEOS	EOS	7.3 km	MPC · JPL
51813	2001 OT_{8}	—	July 17, 2001	Anderson Mesa	LONEOS	EOS	6.9 km	MPC · JPL
51814	2001 OZ_{8}	—	July 20, 2001	Anderson Mesa	LONEOS	EOS	9.4 km	MPC · JPL
51815	2001 OM_{10}	—	July 19, 2001	Palomar	NEAT	EOS	6.4 km	MPC · JPL
51816	2001 OY_{12}	—	July 21, 2001	Palomar	NEAT	·	5.1 km	MPC · JPL
51817	2001 OA_{13}	—	July 21, 2001	Reedy Creek	J. Broughton	EUN	3.4 km	MPC · JPL
51818	2001 OM_{15}	—	July 18, 2001	Palomar	NEAT	·	6.1 km	MPC · JPL
51819	2001 OZ_{15}	—	July 19, 2001	Palomar	NEAT	DOR	6.2 km	MPC · JPL
51820	2001 OT_{19}	—	July 18, 2001	Haleakala	NEAT	(5)	2.2 km	MPC · JPL
51821	2001 OV_{20}	—	July 21, 2001	Anderson Mesa	LONEOS	EUN	5.2 km	MPC · JPL
51822	2001 OB_{25}	—	July 16, 2001	Haleakala	NEAT	·	9.1 km	MPC · JPL
51823 Rickhusband	2001 OY_{28}	Rickhusband	July 18, 2001	Palomar	NEAT	LIX	8.7 km	MPC · JPL
51824 Mikeanderson	2001 OE_{30}	Mikeanderson	July 19, 2001	Palomar	NEAT	EOS	5.0 km	MPC · JPL
51825 Davidbrown	2001 OQ_{33}	Davidbrown	July 19, 2001	Palomar	NEAT	EOS	4.9 km	MPC · JPL
51826 Kalpanachawla	2001 OB_{34}	Kalpanachawla	July 19, 2001	Palomar	NEAT	EOS	6.9 km	MPC · JPL
51827 Laurelclark	2001 OH_{38}	Laurelclark	July 20, 2001	Palomar	NEAT	·	6.0 km	MPC · JPL
51828 Ilanramon	2001 OU_{39}	Ilanramon	July 20, 2001	Palomar	NEAT	GEF	5.5 km	MPC · JPL
51829 Williemccool	2001 OD_{41}	Williemccool	July 21, 2001	Palomar	NEAT	V	2.0 km	MPC · JPL
51830	2001 OO_{44}	—	July 23, 2001	Palomar	NEAT	·	6.2 km	MPC · JPL
51831	2001 OT_{44}	—	July 23, 2001	Haleakala	NEAT	·	11 km	MPC · JPL
51832	2001 OS_{46}	—	July 16, 2001	Anderson Mesa	LONEOS	·	6.2 km	MPC · JPL
51833	2001 OP_{47}	—	July 16, 2001	Anderson Mesa	LONEOS	EUN	4.1 km	MPC · JPL
51834	2001 OV_{47}	—	July 16, 2001	Anderson Mesa	LONEOS	EOS	5.3 km	MPC · JPL
51835	2001 OF_{52}	—	July 21, 2001	Palomar	NEAT	·	4.8 km	MPC · JPL
51836	2001 OH_{56}	—	July 26, 2001	Palomar	NEAT	CYB	9.7 km	MPC · JPL
51837	2001 OA_{59}	—	July 21, 2001	Haleakala	NEAT	·	9.9 km	MPC · JPL
51838	2001 OC_{61}	—	July 21, 2001	Haleakala	NEAT	T_{j} (2.99) · 3:2	10 km	MPC · JPL
51839	2001 OF_{65}	—	July 22, 2001	Palomar	NEAT	·	5.8 km	MPC · JPL
51840	2001 OH_{65}	—	July 22, 2001	Palomar	NEAT	EOS	5.2 km	MPC · JPL
51841	2001 OO_{65}	—	July 23, 2001	Reedy Creek	J. Broughton	·	3.1 km	MPC · JPL
51842	2001 OQ_{68}	—	July 16, 2001	Haleakala	NEAT	EUN	3.5 km	MPC · JPL
51843	2001 OF_{83}	—	July 27, 2001	Palomar	NEAT	·	7.6 km	MPC · JPL
51844	2001 ON_{83}	—	July 27, 2001	Palomar	NEAT	·	8.0 km	MPC · JPL
51845	2001 OO_{83}	—	July 27, 2001	Palomar	NEAT	·	8.0 km	MPC · JPL
51846	2001 OT_{88}	—	July 21, 2001	Haleakala	NEAT	EUN	3.8 km	MPC · JPL
51847	2001 OV_{88}	—	July 21, 2001	Haleakala	NEAT	KOR	4.7 km	MPC · JPL
51848	2001 OZ_{89}	—	July 23, 2001	Haleakala	NEAT	·	9.6 km	MPC · JPL
51849	2001 OX_{90}	—	July 25, 2001	Haleakala	NEAT	·	5.5 km	MPC · JPL
51850	2001 OJ_{92}	—	July 22, 2001	Palomar	NEAT	·	11 km	MPC · JPL
51851	2001 OC_{93}	—	July 24, 2001	Palomar	NEAT	·	11 km	MPC · JPL
51852	2001 OB_{95}	—	July 29, 2001	Palomar	NEAT	·	19 km	MPC · JPL
51853	2001 OY_{96}	—	July 25, 2001	Haleakala	NEAT	EOS	5.5 km	MPC · JPL
51854	2001 OG_{100}	—	July 27, 2001	Anderson Mesa	LONEOS	·	16 km	MPC · JPL
51855	2001 OK_{102}	—	July 28, 2001	Haleakala	NEAT	EUN	3.3 km	MPC · JPL
51856	2001 OT_{103}	—	July 29, 2001	Anderson Mesa	LONEOS	·	7.1 km	MPC · JPL
51857	2001 OA_{105}	—	July 28, 2001	Anderson Mesa	LONEOS	EUN	5.4 km	MPC · JPL
51858	2001 OQ_{105}	—	July 29, 2001	Socorro	LINEAR	·	8.2 km	MPC · JPL
51859	2001 OR_{107}	—	July 30, 2001	Socorro	LINEAR	HYG ·	7.9 km	MPC · JPL
51860	2001 OS_{107}	—	July 30, 2001	Socorro	LINEAR	EOS	5.7 km	MPC · JPL
51861	2001 PD	—	August 1, 2001	Palomar	NEAT	·	5.4 km	MPC · JPL
51862	2001 PH	—	August 4, 2001	Haleakala	NEAT	·	8.0 km	MPC · JPL
51863	2001 PQ	—	August 6, 2001	Palomar	NEAT	THM	5.6 km	MPC · JPL
51864	2001 PW	—	August 2, 2001	Haleakala	NEAT	PAD	6.3 km	MPC · JPL
51865	2001 PR_{2}	—	August 3, 2001	Haleakala	NEAT	3:2	10 km	MPC · JPL
51866	2001 PH_{3}	—	August 4, 2001	Haleakala	NEAT	PHO	4.0 km	MPC · JPL
51867	2001 PC_{4}	—	August 5, 2001	Palomar	NEAT	·	4.9 km	MPC · JPL
51868	2001 PE_{4}	—	August 6, 2001	Palomar	NEAT	·	8.7 km	MPC · JPL
51869	2001 PR_{4}	—	August 5, 2001	Palomar	NEAT	EOS	4.6 km	MPC · JPL
51870	2001 PC_{6}	—	August 10, 2001	Haleakala	NEAT	EOS	5.8 km	MPC · JPL
51871	2001 PH_{8}	—	August 11, 2001	Palomar	NEAT	VER	8.1 km	MPC · JPL
51872	2001 PN_{9}	—	August 10, 2001	Ametlla de Mar	J. Nomen	EOS	11 km	MPC · JPL
51873	2001 PX_{19}	—	August 10, 2001	Palomar	NEAT	·	5.5 km	MPC · JPL
51874 Alessiosquilloni	2001 PZ_{28}	Alessiosquilloni	August 15, 2001	San Marcello	M. Tombelli, A. Boattini	T_{j} (2.97) · 3:2	20 km	MPC · JPL
51875	2001 PG_{34}	—	August 10, 2001	Palomar	NEAT	EOS	7.6 km	MPC · JPL
51876	2001 PU_{41}	—	August 11, 2001	Palomar	NEAT	CYB	11 km	MPC · JPL
51877	2001 PO_{46}	—	August 12, 2001	Palomar	NEAT	·	6.0 km	MPC · JPL
51878	2001 PP_{46}	—	August 13, 2001	Palomar	NEAT	URS	8.0 km	MPC · JPL
51879	2001 PA_{47}	—	August 14, 2001	Haleakala	NEAT	EOS	6.7 km	MPC · JPL
51880	2001 PV_{52}	—	August 14, 2001	Haleakala	NEAT	·	7.3 km	MPC · JPL
51881	2001 PF_{58}	—	August 14, 2001	Haleakala	NEAT	EOS	5.9 km	MPC · JPL
51882	2001 QM_{6}	—	August 16, 2001	Socorro	LINEAR	·	7.3 km	MPC · JPL
51883	2001 QO_{8}	—	August 16, 2001	Socorro	LINEAR	·	4.1 km	MPC · JPL
51884	2001 QS_{10}	—	August 16, 2001	Socorro	LINEAR	KOR	4.6 km	MPC · JPL
51885	2001 QD_{14}	—	August 16, 2001	Socorro	LINEAR	3:2	10 km	MPC · JPL
51886	2001 QV_{16}	—	August 16, 2001	Socorro	LINEAR	·	12 km	MPC · JPL
51887	2001 QA_{17}	—	August 16, 2001	Socorro	LINEAR	·	3.9 km	MPC · JPL
51888	2001 QZ_{17}	—	August 16, 2001	Socorro	LINEAR	3:2 · SHU · slow	20 km	MPC · JPL
51889	2001 QC_{18}	—	August 16, 2001	Socorro	LINEAR	HYG	9.0 km	MPC · JPL
51890	2001 QH_{18}	—	August 16, 2001	Socorro	LINEAR	·	12 km	MPC · JPL
51891	2001 QS_{19}	—	August 16, 2001	Socorro	LINEAR	KOR	5.9 km	MPC · JPL
51892	2001 QB_{25}	—	August 16, 2001	Socorro	LINEAR	EOS	6.7 km	MPC · JPL
51893	2001 QD_{25}	—	August 16, 2001	Socorro	LINEAR	·	9.9 km	MPC · JPL
51894	2001 QU_{26}	—	August 16, 2001	Socorro	LINEAR	HYG	9.5 km	MPC · JPL
51895 Biblialexa	2001 QX_{33}	Biblialexa	August 19, 2001	Ondřejov	P. Pravec, P. Kušnirák	·	4.8 km	MPC · JPL
51896	2001 QY_{34}	—	August 16, 2001	Socorro	LINEAR	·	3.7 km	MPC · JPL
51897	2001 QN_{35}	—	August 16, 2001	Socorro	LINEAR	·	6.2 km	MPC · JPL
51898	2001 QS_{36}	—	August 16, 2001	Socorro	LINEAR	·	8.9 km	MPC · JPL
51899	2001 QD_{37}	—	August 16, 2001	Socorro	LINEAR	EOS	5.6 km	MPC · JPL
51900	2001 QF_{37}	—	August 16, 2001	Socorro	LINEAR	·	5.9 km	MPC · JPL

== 51901–52000 ==
back to top

Designation			Discovery			Properties		Ref
Permanent	Provisional	Named after	Date	Site	Discoverer(s)	Category	Diam.	Ref
51901	2001 QF_{39}	—	August 16, 2001	Socorro	LINEAR	EOS	5.0 km	MPC · JPL
51902	2001 QL_{39}	—	August 16, 2001	Socorro	LINEAR	THM	6.7 km	MPC · JPL
51903	2001 QR_{41}	—	August 16, 2001	Socorro	LINEAR	·	6.4 km	MPC · JPL
51904	2001 QZ_{41}	—	August 16, 2001	Socorro	LINEAR	·	3.1 km	MPC · JPL
51905	2001 QM_{51}	—	August 16, 2001	Socorro	LINEAR	·	4.8 km	MPC · JPL
51906	2001 QN_{51}	—	August 16, 2001	Socorro	LINEAR	HYG	8.4 km	MPC · JPL
51907	2001 QF_{58}	—	August 16, 2001	Socorro	LINEAR	·	5.5 km	MPC · JPL
51908	2001 QP_{59}	—	August 18, 2001	Socorro	LINEAR	·	7.4 km	MPC · JPL
51909	2001 QD_{60}	—	August 18, 2001	Socorro	LINEAR	ADE	6.6 km	MPC · JPL
51910	2001 QQ_{60}	—	August 18, 2001	Socorro	LINEAR	L5	26 km	MPC · JPL
51911	2001 QD_{68}	—	August 20, 2001	Oakley	Wolfe, C.	·	12 km	MPC · JPL
51912	2001 QS_{69}	—	August 17, 2001	Socorro	LINEAR	·	12 km	MPC · JPL
51913	2001 QV_{69}	—	August 17, 2001	Socorro	LINEAR	·	8.4 km	MPC · JPL
51914	2001 QM_{70}	—	August 17, 2001	Socorro	LINEAR	VER	11 km	MPC · JPL
51915 Andry	2001 QF_{71}	Andry	August 20, 2001	Colleverde	V. S. Casulli	ADE	11 km	MPC · JPL
51916	2001 QQ_{73}	—	August 16, 2001	Socorro	LINEAR	·	7.2 km	MPC · JPL
51917	2001 QQ_{83}	—	August 17, 2001	Socorro	LINEAR	·	8.5 km	MPC · JPL
51918	2001 QG_{85}	—	August 19, 2001	Socorro	LINEAR	·	7.9 km	MPC · JPL
51919	2001 QL_{86}	—	August 16, 2001	Palomar	NEAT	·	16 km	MPC · JPL
51920	2001 QL_{87}	—	August 17, 2001	Palomar	NEAT	URS	15 km	MPC · JPL
51921	2001 QU_{90}	—	August 22, 2001	Socorro	LINEAR	·	10 km	MPC · JPL
51922	2001 QZ_{92}	—	August 22, 2001	Socorro	LINEAR	·	5.8 km	MPC · JPL
51923	2001 QD_{95}	—	August 22, 2001	Kitt Peak	Spacewatch	KOR	2.9 km	MPC · JPL
51924	2001 QW_{96}	—	August 16, 2001	Socorro	LINEAR	(1118)	15 km	MPC · JPL
51925	2001 QA_{98}	—	August 19, 2001	Socorro	LINEAR	(5)	3.2 km	MPC · JPL
51926	2001 QE_{98}	—	August 19, 2001	Socorro	LINEAR	·	8.4 km	MPC · JPL
51927	2001 QO_{122}	—	August 19, 2001	Socorro	LINEAR	·	12 km	MPC · JPL
51928	2001 QQ_{122}	—	August 19, 2001	Socorro	LINEAR	VER	7.3 km	MPC · JPL
51929	2001 QF_{126}	—	August 20, 2001	Socorro	LINEAR	·	6.4 km	MPC · JPL
51930	2001 QW_{127}	—	August 20, 2001	Socorro	LINEAR	HIL · 3:2	20 km	MPC · JPL
51931	2001 QA_{128}	—	August 20, 2001	Socorro	LINEAR	GEF	3.6 km	MPC · JPL
51932	2001 QF_{129}	—	August 20, 2001	Socorro	LINEAR	·	6.9 km	MPC · JPL
51933	2001 QD_{133}	—	August 21, 2001	Socorro	LINEAR	EOS	5.1 km	MPC · JPL
51934	2001 QU_{133}	—	August 21, 2001	Socorro	LINEAR	EOS	7.2 km	MPC · JPL
51935	2001 QK_{134}	—	August 22, 2001	Socorro	LINEAR	L5	23 km	MPC · JPL
51936	2001 QM_{141}	—	August 24, 2001	Socorro	LINEAR	·	6.8 km	MPC · JPL
51937	2001 QD_{159}	—	August 23, 2001	Anderson Mesa	LONEOS	·	8.3 km	MPC · JPL
51938	2001 QL_{159}	—	August 23, 2001	Anderson Mesa	LONEOS	·	11 km	MPC · JPL
51939	2001 QG_{168}	—	August 25, 2001	Haleakala	NEAT	EUN	3.8 km	MPC · JPL
51940	2001 QB_{172}	—	August 25, 2001	Socorro	LINEAR	·	4.5 km	MPC · JPL
51941	2001 QT_{175}	—	August 23, 2001	Kitt Peak	Spacewatch	·	3.6 km	MPC · JPL
51942	2001 QL_{177}	—	August 22, 2001	Palomar	NEAT	EOS	5.4 km	MPC · JPL
51943	2001 QK_{181}	—	August 28, 2001	Palomar	NEAT	·	14 km	MPC · JPL
51944	2001 QW_{194}	—	August 22, 2001	Socorro	LINEAR	·	10 km	MPC · JPL
51945	2001 QM_{196}	—	August 22, 2001	Haleakala	NEAT	·	8.0 km	MPC · JPL
51946	2001 QE_{205}	—	August 23, 2001	Anderson Mesa	LONEOS	·	11 km	MPC · JPL
51947	2001 QE_{215}	—	August 23, 2001	Anderson Mesa	LONEOS	EMA	7.9 km	MPC · JPL
51948	2001 QJ_{215}	—	August 23, 2001	Anderson Mesa	LONEOS	·	4.1 km	MPC · JPL
51949	2001 QF_{219}	—	August 23, 2001	Kitt Peak	Spacewatch	EOS	5.7 km	MPC · JPL
51950	2001 QA_{222}	—	August 24, 2001	Anderson Mesa	LONEOS	EOS	6.5 km	MPC · JPL
51951	2001 QD_{222}	—	August 24, 2001	Anderson Mesa	LONEOS	EOS	6.1 km	MPC · JPL
51952	2001 QG_{226}	—	August 24, 2001	Anderson Mesa	LONEOS	EOS	7.7 km	MPC · JPL
51953	2001 QK_{239}	—	August 24, 2001	Socorro	LINEAR	HYG	8.5 km	MPC · JPL
51954	2001 QR_{249}	—	August 24, 2001	Haleakala	NEAT	·	8.4 km	MPC · JPL
51955	2001 QG_{250}	—	August 24, 2001	Haleakala	NEAT	·	7.5 km	MPC · JPL
51956	2001 QE_{251}	—	August 25, 2001	Socorro	LINEAR	·	2.9 km	MPC · JPL
51957	2001 QF_{251}	—	August 25, 2001	Socorro	LINEAR	·	7.8 km	MPC · JPL
51958	2001 QJ_{256}	—	August 25, 2001	Socorro	LINEAR	L5	27 km	MPC · JPL
51959	2001 QH_{257}	—	August 25, 2001	Socorro	LINEAR	·	19 km	MPC · JPL
51960	2001 QW_{261}	—	August 25, 2001	Socorro	LINEAR	EOS	6.0 km	MPC · JPL
51961	2001 QC_{266}	—	August 20, 2001	Socorro	LINEAR	·	10 km	MPC · JPL
51962	2001 QH_{267}	—	August 20, 2001	Palomar	NEAT	L5	27 km	MPC · JPL
51963	2001 QN_{276}	—	August 19, 2001	Socorro	LINEAR	·	11 km	MPC · JPL
51964	2001 QU_{276}	—	August 19, 2001	Socorro	LINEAR	VER	10 km	MPC · JPL
51965	2001 QO_{281}	—	August 19, 2001	Socorro	LINEAR	EUP	15 km	MPC · JPL
51966	2001 QG_{282}	—	August 19, 2001	Anderson Mesa	LONEOS	·	12 km	MPC · JPL
51967	2001 QC_{283}	—	August 18, 2001	Palomar	NEAT	TIR	6.7 km	MPC · JPL
51968	2001 QR_{284}	—	August 31, 2001	Palomar	NEAT	·	5.2 km	MPC · JPL
51969	2001 QZ_{292}	—	August 16, 2001	Palomar	NEAT	L5	24 km	MPC · JPL
51970	2001 RK_{3}	—	September 8, 2001	Anderson Mesa	LONEOS	·	7.5 km	MPC · JPL
51971	2001 RP_{4}	—	September 8, 2001	Socorro	LINEAR	·	9.3 km	MPC · JPL
51972	2001 RU_{19}	—	September 7, 2001	Socorro	LINEAR	THM	9.5 km	MPC · JPL
51973	2001 RX_{23}	—	September 7, 2001	Socorro	LINEAR	·	3.8 km	MPC · JPL
51974	2001 RW_{31}	—	September 8, 2001	Socorro	LINEAR	EOS	6.5 km	MPC · JPL
51975	2001 RD_{54}	—	September 12, 2001	Socorro	LINEAR	THM	7.9 km	MPC · JPL
51976	2001 RZ_{79}	—	September 9, 2001	Palomar	NEAT	·	6.4 km	MPC · JPL
51977	2001 RF_{120}	—	September 12, 2001	Socorro	LINEAR	EOS	4.9 km	MPC · JPL
51978	2001 RQ_{126}	—	September 12, 2001	Socorro	LINEAR	·	6.1 km	MPC · JPL
51979	2001 RU_{146}	—	September 9, 2001	Palomar	NEAT	·	5.3 km	MPC · JPL
51980	2001 RN_{147}	—	September 9, 2001	Palomar	NEAT	EOS	7.3 km	MPC · JPL
51981	2001 RS_{148}	—	September 10, 2001	Anderson Mesa	LONEOS	·	6.4 km	MPC · JPL
51982	2001 RK_{150}	—	September 11, 2001	Anderson Mesa	LONEOS	·	5.4 km	MPC · JPL
51983 Hönig	2001 SZ_{8}	Hönig	September 19, 2001	Fountain Hills	C. W. Juels, P. R. Holvorcem	HIL · 3:2	10 km	MPC · JPL
51984	2001 SS_{115}	—	September 17, 2001	Desert Eagle	W. K. Y. Yeung	L5	20 km	MPC · JPL
51985 Kirby	2001 SA_{116}	Kirby	September 22, 2001	Goodricke-Pigott	R. A. Tucker	·	9.7 km	MPC · JPL
51986	2001 SA_{172}	—	September 16, 2001	Socorro	LINEAR	EOS	7.0 km	MPC · JPL
51987	2001 SV_{179}	—	September 19, 2001	Socorro	LINEAR	KOR	3.6 km	MPC · JPL
51988	2001 SV_{265}	—	September 25, 2001	Desert Eagle	W. K. Y. Yeung	·	2.5 km	MPC · JPL
51989	2001 ST_{286}	—	September 22, 2001	Palomar	NEAT	·	10 km	MPC · JPL
51990	2001 SX_{286}	—	September 22, 2001	Palomar	NEAT	EOS	7.2 km	MPC · JPL
51991	2001 SQ_{339}	—	September 21, 2001	Anderson Mesa	LONEOS	·	11 km	MPC · JPL
51992	2001 TX_{37}	—	October 14, 2001	Socorro	LINEAR	·	4.9 km	MPC · JPL
51993	2001 TT_{43}	—	October 14, 2001	Socorro	LINEAR	V	2.0 km	MPC · JPL
51994	2001 TJ_{58}	—	October 13, 2001	Socorro	LINEAR	L5	20 km	MPC · JPL
51995	2001 TK_{101}	—	October 15, 2001	Socorro	LINEAR	GEF	3.4 km	MPC · JPL
51996	2001 TH_{118}	—	October 15, 2001	Socorro	LINEAR	·	6.8 km	MPC · JPL
51997	2001 TW_{137}	—	October 14, 2001	Palomar	NEAT	·	13 km	MPC · JPL
51998	2001 TR_{174}	—	October 15, 2001	Socorro	LINEAR	·	11 km	MPC · JPL
51999	2001 UC_{22}	—	October 17, 2001	Socorro	LINEAR	EOS	6.3 km	MPC · JPL
52000	2001 UY_{22}	—	October 18, 2001	Socorro	LINEAR	EOS	9.6 km	MPC · JPL

back to top

== See also ==
- Meanings of minor-planet names: 51001–52000
