= Meanings of minor-planet names: 51001–52000 =

As minor planet discoveries are confirmed, they are given a permanent number by the IAU's Minor Planet Center (MPC), and the discoverers can then submit names for them, following the IAU's naming conventions. The list below concerns those minor planets in the specified number-range that have received names, and explains the meanings of those names.

Official naming citations of newly named small Solar System bodies are approved and published in a bulletin by IAU's Working Group for Small Bodies Nomenclature (WGSBN). Before May 2021, citations were published in MPC's Minor Planet Circulars for many decades. Recent citations can also be found on the JPL Small-Body Database (SBDB). Until his death in 2016, German astronomer Lutz D. Schmadel compiled these citations into the Dictionary of Minor Planet Names (DMP) and regularly updated the collection.

Based on Paul Herget's The Names of the Minor Planets, Schmadel also researched the unclear origin of numerous asteroids, most of which had been named prior to World War II. This article incorporates text from this source, which is in the public domain: SBDB New namings may only be added to this list below after official publication as the preannouncement of names is condemned. The WGSBN publishes a comprehensive guideline for the naming rules of non-cometary small Solar System bodies.

== 51001–51100 ==
Named minor planet	Provisional	This minor planet was named for...	Ref · Catalog
51023 Benavidezlozano	2000 GT_{109}	Paula G. Benavidez Lozano (born 1977) is an associate professor at Universidad de Alicante (Spain). Her research includes observation of trans-Neptunian bodies and modeling of collision processes, and the evolution and internal structure of small bodies.	IAU · 51023

== 51101–51200 ==
back to top

Named minor planet	Provisional	This minor planet was named for...	Ref · Catalog
51166 Huimanto	2000 HW_{63}	Man-To Hui (born 1990) is a Chinese postdoctoral researcher at the Institute for Astronomy, University of Hawaii (Honolulu, Hawaii), whose studies include photometric and dynamical studies of active asteroids, and near-Sun asteroids and comets.	IAU · 51166
51178 Geraintjones	2000 HX_{70}	Geraint H. Jones (born 1970) is head of planetary science at University College London's Mullard Space Science Laboratory. He leads the European Space Agency's Comet Interceptor mission, and studies the interactions between comets and the solar wind, as well as planetary magnetospheres.	IAU · 51178

== 51201–51300 ==
back to top

Named minor planet	Provisional	This minor planet was named for...	Ref · Catalog
51261 Holuša	2000 JH_{64}	Jiří Holuša (1964–2011), educator at Ostrava Planetarium, Czech Republic	JPL · 51261

== 51301–51400 ==
back to top

Named minor planet	Provisional	This minor planet was named for...	Ref · Catalog
There are no named minor planets in this number range

== 51401–51500 ==
back to top

Named minor planet	Provisional	This minor planet was named for...	Ref · Catalog
51406 Massimocalvani	2001 DL_{108}	Massimo Calvani (born 1947), Italian astronomer, director of the Astronomical Observatory of Padua and Asiago from 1999 to 2005	JPL · 51406
51415 Tovinder	2001 ER_{13}	Pat Tovsen (born 1951) and her husband Philip Inderwiesen (born 1953), American light pollution control advocates	JPL · 51415
51419 Deshapriya	2001 EJ_{20}	Prasanna Deshapriya (born 1989) is a postdoctoral researcher at LESIA-Paris Observatory (France) whose studies include imaging analysis, spectrophotometry and visible-infrared spectroscopy of small bodies by the Rosetta and OSIRIS-REx spacecraft.	IAU · 51419
51430 Ireneclaire	2001 FH_{7}	Irene Claire Schwartz, mother of Michael Schwartz of Tenagra Observatories	JPL · 51430
51431 Jayardee	2001 FH_{9}	James R. Durig (1935–2020), astronomer and the father of Douglas Tybor Durig who discovered this minor planet	JPL · 51431

== 51501–51600 ==
back to top

Named minor planet	Provisional	This minor planet was named for...	Ref · Catalog
51529 Marksimpson	2001 FB_{128}	Mark Simpson (born 1969), Canadian scientist trained in electronic design and software engineering.	JPL · 51529
51569 Garywessen	2001 HV_{3}	Gary Wessen (born 1949) has conducted archaeological research in western North America for over 40 years and has recorded over 250 new sites. He works with many Native American tribes, especially the Makah. He has also served as an officer for many archaeological associations.	JPL · 51569
51570 Phendricksen	2001 HE_{4}	Peter B. Hendricksen (born 1951), electrical engineer, mathematician, accomplished classical guitarist and past president of the Black Hills Astronomical Society	JPL · 51570
51599 Brittany	2001 HR_{24}	Brittany Johnson, niece of Loren C. Ball who discovered this minor planet	JPL · 51599

== 51601–51700 ==
back to top

Named minor planet	Provisional	This minor planet was named for...	Ref · Catalog
51655 Susannemond	2001 JA	Susanne Marie Emond, American dietitian and friend of the discoverer	JPL · 51655
51659 Robohachi	2001 JN_{1}	Robohachi is a robot exhibited in the exhibition hall on the 2nd floor of Hachinohe City Children's Science Museum. He has been popular with children as a symbol of the Museum since it first opened. He talks, winks, moves his head from side to side and stretches his arms when his function buttons are pressed.	IAU · 51659
51663 Lovelock	2001 JL_{7}	James Lovelock (1919–2022), chemist, inventor, earth system scientist and author	JPL · 51663

== 51701–51800 ==
back to top

Named minor planet	Provisional	This minor planet was named for...	Ref · Catalog
51741 Davidixon	2001 KQ_{50}	David Dixon (born 1947), American amateur astronomer, who operates Jornada Observatory, New Mexico Src	MPC · 51741
51772 Sparker	2001 MJ	Steve Parker (born 1951), director of Hidden Valley Observatory	JPL · 51772

== 51801–51900 ==
back to top

Named minor planet	Provisional	This minor planet was named for...	Ref · Catalog
51823 Rickhusband	2001 OY_{28}	Rick Husband (1957–2003), American astronaut, commander of the space shuttle Columbia (STS-107)	MPC · 51823
51824 Mikeanderson	2001 OE_{30}	Michael P. Anderson (1959–2003), American astronaut, payload commander of the space shuttle Columbia (STS-107)	MPC · 51824
51825 Davidbrown	2001 OQ_{33}	David M. Brown (1956–2003), American astronaut, mission specialist on board the space shuttle Columbia (STS-107)	MPC · 51825
51826 Kalpanachawla	2001 OB_{34}	Kalpana Chawla (1962–2003), American astronaut, mission specialist on board the space shuttle Columbia (STS-107)	MPC · 51826
51827 Laurelclark	2001 OH_{38}	Laurel Clark (1961–2003), American astronaut, mission specialist on board the space shuttle Columbia (STS-107)	MPC · 51827
51828 Ilanramon	2001 OU_{39}	Ilan Ramon (1954–2003), Israeli astronaut, payload specialist on board the space shuttle Columbia (STS-107)	MPC · 51828
51829 Williemccool	2001 OD_{41}	William C. McCool (1961–2003), American astronaut, pilot of the space shuttle Columbia (STS-107)	MPC · 51829
51874 Alessiosquilloni	2001 PZ_{28}	Alessio Squilloni (b. 2000), an Italian amateur astronomer.	IAU · 51874
51895 Biblialexa	2001 QX_{33}	Bibliotheca Alexandrina, a revival of the old library at Alexandria	JPL · 51895

== 51901–52000 ==
back to top

Named minor planet	Provisional	This minor planet was named for...	Ref · Catalog
51915 Andry	2001 QF_{71}	Andrea Casulli (born 2013), grandson of Silvano Casulli who discovered this minor planet	JPL · 51915
51983 Hönig	2001 SZ_{8}	Sebastian F. Hönig (born 1978), German amateur astronomer	MPC · 51983
51985 Kirby	2001 SA_{116}	Jack Kirby (1917–1994), American comic book artist, writer, and editor	JPL · 51985

back to top

Preceded by 50,001–51,000	Meanings of minor-planet names List of minor planets: 51,001–52,000	Succeeded by 52,001–53,000
