= 51983 Hönig =

Main-belt asteroid

Discovery
- Discovered by: C. W. Juels; P. R. Holvorcem
- Discovery site: Fountain Hills Obs
- Discovery date: 19 September 2001

Designations
- Named after: Sebastian Hönig (discoverer of minor planets)
- Alternative designations: 2001 SZ_{8}
- Minor planet category: main-belt · (outer); Hilda (group and family)

Orbital characteristics
- Epoch 4 September 2017 (JD 2458000.5)
- Uncertainty parameter 0
- Observation arc: 63.07 yr (23,035 days)
- Aphelion: 4.4369 AU
- Perihelion: 3.4875 AU
- Semi-major axis: 3.9622 AU
- Eccentricity: 0.1198
- Orbital period (sidereal): 7.89 yr (2,881 days)
- Mean anomaly: 52.159°
- Mean motion: 0° 7^{m} 30^{s} / day
- Inclination: 9.3988°
- Longitude of ascending node: 10.012°
- Argument of perihelion: 295.11°

Physical characteristics
- Dimensions: 13 km (estimate at 0.06)
- Absolute magnitude (H): 13.2

51983 Hönig (provisional designation 2001 SZ_{8}) is a Hildian asteroid from the outermost regions of the asteroid belt, approximately 13 kilometers in diameter. It was discovered on 19 September 2001, by astronomers Charles Juels and Paulo Holvorcem at the Fountain Hills Observatory (678) in Arizona, United States. The asteroid was named after German astronomer Sebastian Hönig.

== Orbit and classification ==
Hönig is a member of the Hilda family (001), a collisional asteroid family of carbonaceous asteroids within the larger dynamical Hilda group. It orbits the Sun in the outermost region of the main belt at a distance of 3.5–4.4 AU once every 7 years and 11 months (2,881 days). Its orbit has an eccentricity of 0.12 and an inclination of 9° with respect to the ecliptic.

The body's observation arc begins at Palomar Observatory in September 1954, on precovery images found by the Digitized Sky Survey.

== Physical characteristics ==
The asteroid's spectral type is unknown. The Hilda family's overall spectral type is that of a carbonaceous C-type.

=== Diameter and albedo ===
Hönig has not been observed by any space-based telescope such as the Infrared Astronomical Satellite IRAS, the Japanese Akari satellite or the NEOWISE mission of NASA's Wide-field Infrared Survey Explorer. Based on an assumed albedo of 0.06 – derived from the parent body of the Hilda family, 153 Hilda, which is also typical for carbonaceous asteroids – Hönig measures 13 kilometers in diameter for an absolute magnitude of 13.2.

=== Rotation period ===
As of 2017, no rotational lightcurve of Hönig has been obtained from photometric observations. The body's rotation period, pole axis and shape remain unknown.

== Naming ==
This minor planet was named after German astronomer Sebastian F. Hönig (born 1978), a prolific discoverer of minor planets and several comets, including the hyperbolic comet C/2002 O4, which disintegrated shortly after its discovery in 2002. The official naming citation was published by the Minor Planet Center on 7 January 2004 (M.P.C. 50465).
