= List of minor planets: 31001–32000 =

The following is a partial list of minor planets, running from minor-planet number 31001 through 32000, inclusive. The primary data for this and other partial lists is based on JPL's "Small-Body Orbital Elements" and data available from the Minor Planet Center. Critical list information is also provided by the MPC, unless otherwise specified from Lowell Observatory. A detailed description of the table's columns and additional sources are given on the main page including a complete list of every page in this series, and a statistical break-up on the dynamical classification of minor planets.

Also see the summary list of all named bodies in numerical and alphabetical order, and the corresponding naming citations for the number range of this particular list. New namings may only be added to this list after official publication, as the preannouncement of names is condemned by the Working Group for Small Bodies Nomenclature of the International Astronomical Union.

Near-Earth obj.	MBA (inner)	MBA (outer)	Centaur
Mars-crosser	MBA (middle)	Jupiter trojan	Trans-Neptunian obj.
Unclassified

== 31001–31100 ==
Designation			Discovery			Properties		Ref
Permanent	Provisional	Named after	Date	Site	Discoverer(s)	Category	Diam.	Ref
31001	1995 VG_{14}	—	November 15, 1995	Kitt Peak	Spacewatch	·	5.4 km	MPC · JPL
31002	1995 VR_{15}	—	November 15, 1995	Kitt Peak	Spacewatch	·	8.1 km	MPC · JPL
31003	1995 WQ_{2}	—	November 16, 1995	Kushiro	S. Ueda, H. Kaneda	URS	9.8 km	MPC · JPL
31004	1995 WW_{28}	—	November 19, 1995	Kitt Peak	Spacewatch	·	10 km	MPC · JPL
31005	1995 WC_{31}	—	November 19, 1995	Kitt Peak	Spacewatch	EOS	9.6 km	MPC · JPL
31006 Katherine	1995 XC	Katherine	December 3, 1995	Sudbury	D. di Cicco	slow	16 km	MPC · JPL
31007	1996 AE_{14}	—	January 15, 1996	Kitt Peak	Spacewatch	·	3.0 km	MPC · JPL
31008	1996 BN_{2}	—	January 26, 1996	Oizumi	T. Kobayashi	·	3.0 km	MPC · JPL
31009	1996 CP	—	February 1, 1996	Xinglong	SCAP	·	9.8 km	MPC · JPL
31010	1996 CJ_{1}	—	February 11, 1996	Oizumi	T. Kobayashi	·	1.9 km	MPC · JPL
31011	1996 CG_{7}	—	February 2, 1996	Xinglong	SCAP	·	2.3 km	MPC · JPL
31012 Jiangshiyang	1996 CG_{8}	Jiangshiyang	February 10, 1996	Xinglong	SCAP	·	2.3 km	MPC · JPL
31013	1996 DR	—	February 19, 1996	Oizumi	T. Kobayashi	slow	3.1 km	MPC · JPL
31014	1996 DW	—	February 21, 1996	Oizumi	T. Kobayashi	·	2.5 km	MPC · JPL
31015 Boccardi	1996 DS_{1}	Boccardi	February 16, 1996	Bologna	San Vittore	·	1.7 km	MPC · JPL
31016	1996 DY_{1}	—	February 23, 1996	Oizumi	T. Kobayashi	·	5.4 km	MPC · JPL
31017	1996 EH_{2}	—	March 15, 1996	Siding Spring	R. H. McNaught	·	3.5 km	MPC · JPL
31018	1996 ET_{2}	—	March 15, 1996	Haleakala	NEAT	·	2.2 km	MPC · JPL
31019	1996 EH_{10}	—	March 12, 1996	Kitt Peak	Spacewatch	NYS	2.6 km	MPC · JPL
31020 Skarupa	1996 FP_{1}	Skarupa	March 17, 1996	Haleakala	AMOS	3:2	13 km	MPC · JPL
31021	1996 FW_{1}	—	March 17, 1996	Haleakala	NEAT	·	2.9 km	MPC · JPL
31022	1996 FJ_{9}	—	March 20, 1996	Kitt Peak	Spacewatch	·	6.8 km	MPC · JPL
31023	1996 FT_{10}	—	March 20, 1996	Kitt Peak	Spacewatch	·	2.0 km	MPC · JPL
31024	1996 FT_{11}	—	March 22, 1996	Kitt Peak	Spacewatch	·	4.4 km	MPC · JPL
31025	1996 GR	—	April 12, 1996	Oizumi	T. Kobayashi	·	2.5 km	MPC · JPL
31026	1996 GB_{7}	—	April 12, 1996	Kitt Peak	Spacewatch	·	2.0 km	MPC · JPL
31027	1996 HQ	—	April 18, 1996	Ondřejov	L. Kotková	·	1.6 km	MPC · JPL
31028 Cerulli	1996 HH_{1}	Cerulli	April 18, 1996	Bologna	San Vittore	·	2.4 km	MPC · JPL
31029	1996 HC_{16}	—	April 18, 1996	La Silla	E. W. Elst	fast	2.4 km	MPC · JPL
31030	1996 HN_{19}	—	April 18, 1996	La Silla	E. W. Elst	V	3.2 km	MPC · JPL
31031 Altiplano	1996 HV_{20}	Altiplano	April 18, 1996	La Silla	E. W. Elst	NYS	3.8 km	MPC · JPL
31032 Scheidemann	1996 HS_{22}	Scheidemann	April 20, 1996	La Silla	E. W. Elst	·	1.9 km	MPC · JPL
31033	1996 HY_{23}	—	April 20, 1996	La Silla	E. W. Elst	·	3.7 km	MPC · JPL
31034	1996 HC_{24}	—	April 20, 1996	La Silla	E. W. Elst	·	2.9 km	MPC · JPL
31035	1996 HJ_{24}	—	April 20, 1996	La Silla	E. W. Elst	·	4.1 km	MPC · JPL
31036	1996 HM_{25}	—	April 20, 1996	La Silla	E. W. Elst	·	3.6 km	MPC · JPL
31037 Mydon	1996 HZ_{25}	Mydon	April 20, 1996	La Silla	E. W. Elst	L5	19 km	MPC · JPL
31038	1996 HG_{26}	—	April 20, 1996	La Silla	E. W. Elst	·	2.5 km	MPC · JPL
31039	1996 JN	—	May 12, 1996	Moriyama	Ikari, Y.	·	4.1 km	MPC · JPL
31040	1996 JW_{8}	—	May 12, 1996	Kitt Peak	Spacewatch	·	3.2 km	MPC · JPL
31041	1996 KD	—	May 16, 1996	Višnjan Observatory	Višnjan	NYS ·	7.0 km	MPC · JPL
31042	1996 KS_{4}	—	May 22, 1996	La Silla	E. W. Elst	NYS	2.9 km	MPC · JPL
31043 Sturm	1996 LT	Sturm	June 11, 1996	Prescott	P. G. Comba	·	2.4 km	MPC · JPL
31044	1996 NY	—	July 11, 1996	Siding Spring	R. H. McNaught	·	4.5 km	MPC · JPL
31045	1996 NP_{4}	—	July 14, 1996	La Silla	E. W. Elst	·	4.5 km	MPC · JPL
31046	1996 NU_{4}	—	July 14, 1996	La Silla	E. W. Elst	·	3.4 km	MPC · JPL
31047	1996 PW_{8}	—	August 8, 1996	La Silla	E. W. Elst	EUN	3.9 km	MPC · JPL
31048	1996 PO_{9}	—	August 11, 1996	Burlington	Handley, T.	EUN	4.9 km	MPC · JPL
31049	1996 QZ	—	August 20, 1996	Kleť	Kleť	·	3.5 km	MPC · JPL
31050	1996 RA_{2}	—	September 12, 1996	Haleakala	NEAT	KOR	5.1 km	MPC · JPL
31051	1996 RT_{3}	—	September 13, 1996	Haleakala	NEAT	MAR	3.3 km	MPC · JPL
31052	1996 RC_{5}	—	September 10, 1996	Haleakala	NEAT	KOR	5.0 km	MPC · JPL
31053	1996 RD_{5}	—	September 11, 1996	Haleakala	NEAT	·	4.4 km	MPC · JPL
31054	1996 RT_{5}	—	September 13, 1996	Lime Creek	R. Linderholm	·	4.5 km	MPC · JPL
31055	1996 RZ_{19}	—	September 8, 1996	Kitt Peak	Spacewatch	·	3.8 km	MPC · JPL
31056	1996 RK_{25}	—	September 12, 1996	Kitt Peak	Spacewatch	MAR ·	4.8 km	MPC · JPL
31057	1996 SK_{4}	—	September 21, 1996	Xinglong	SCAP	MAR	5.2 km	MPC · JPL
31058	1996 TA_{5}	—	October 8, 1996	Sudbury	D. di Cicco	·	5.9 km	MPC · JPL
31059	1996 TQ_{5}	—	October 1, 1996	Granville	Davis, R. G.	EUN	4.2 km	MPC · JPL
31060	1996 TB_{6}	—	October 3, 1996	Xinglong	SCAP	·	8.5 km	MPC · JPL
31061 Tamao	1996 TK_{7}	Tamao	October 10, 1996	Kuma Kogen	A. Nakamura	·	3.5 km	MPC · JPL
31062	1996 TP_{10}	—	October 9, 1996	Kushiro	S. Ueda, H. Kaneda	EOS	13 km	MPC · JPL
31063	1996 TK_{11}	—	October 11, 1996	Kitami	K. Endate	·	4.3 km	MPC · JPL
31064	1996 TP_{11}	—	October 11, 1996	Haleakala	NEAT	·	5.0 km	MPC · JPL
31065 Beishizhang	1996 TZ_{13}	Beishizhang	October 10, 1996	Xinglong	SCAP	·	3.7 km	MPC · JPL
31066	1996 TR_{25}	—	October 6, 1996	Kitt Peak	Spacewatch	·	4.5 km	MPC · JPL
31067	1996 TF_{50}	—	October 4, 1996	La Silla	E. W. Elst	·	6.9 km	MPC · JPL
31068	1996 TT_{54}	—	October 9, 1996	Xinglong	SCAP	HNS · slow	5.2 km	MPC · JPL
31069	1996 UM_{1}	—	October 18, 1996	Haleakala	NEAT	·	2.6 km	MPC · JPL
31070	1996 VX_{9}	—	November 3, 1996	Kitt Peak	Spacewatch	·	6.8 km	MPC · JPL
31071	1996 VL_{18}	—	November 6, 1996	Kitt Peak	Spacewatch	·	5.8 km	MPC · JPL
31072	1996 VZ_{22}	—	November 9, 1996	Kitt Peak	Spacewatch	·	4.9 km	MPC · JPL
31073	1996 VV_{29}	—	November 7, 1996	Kushiro	S. Ueda, H. Kaneda	·	6.6 km	MPC · JPL
31074	1996 WY_{1}	—	November 24, 1996	Xinglong	SCAP	MAR	3.9 km	MPC · JPL
31075	1996 XV	—	December 1, 1996	Chichibu	N. Satō	·	6.3 km	MPC · JPL
31076	1996 XH_{1}	—	December 2, 1996	Oizumi	T. Kobayashi	H · slow	1.7 km	MPC · JPL
31077	1996 XZ_{2}	—	December 3, 1996	Oizumi	T. Kobayashi	slow	9.5 km	MPC · JPL
31078	1996 XJ_{5}	—	December 6, 1996	Oizumi	T. Kobayashi	·	11 km	MPC · JPL
31079	1996 XS_{5}	—	December 7, 1996	Oizumi	T. Kobayashi	HYG	7.7 km	MPC · JPL
31080	1996 XA_{6}	—	December 7, 1996	Oizumi	T. Kobayashi	·	6.3 km	MPC · JPL
31081	1996 XO_{13}	—	December 9, 1996	Sudbury	D. di Cicco	·	8.4 km	MPC · JPL
31082	1996 XM_{19}	—	December 8, 1996	Oizumi	T. Kobayashi	EOS	5.0 km	MPC · JPL
31083	1996 XE_{32}	—	December 14, 1996	Chichibu	N. Satō	·	7.8 km	MPC · JPL
31084	1996 YX_{2}	—	December 29, 1996	Chichibu	N. Satō	THM	6.1 km	MPC · JPL
31085	1997 AV_{12}	—	January 10, 1997	Oizumi	T. Kobayashi	·	8.4 km	MPC · JPL
31086 Gehringer	1997 AT_{17}	Gehringer	January 12, 1997	Goodricke-Pigott	R. A. Tucker	·	5.1 km	MPC · JPL
31087 Oirase	1997 AA_{22}	Oirase	January 9, 1997	Chichibu	N. Satō	EOS	6.3 km	MPC · JPL
31088	1997 BV	—	January 18, 1997	Xinglong	SCAP	·	6.2 km	MPC · JPL
31089	1997 BW_{1}	—	January 29, 1997	Oizumi	T. Kobayashi	·	3.7 km	MPC · JPL
31090	1997 BJ_{5}	—	January 31, 1997	Kitt Peak	Spacewatch	·	12 km	MPC · JPL
31091 Bettiventicinque	1997 BE_{9}	Bettiventicinque	January 30, 1997	Cima Ekar	U. Munari, M. Tombelli	H · slow	1.5 km	MPC · JPL
31092 Carolowilhelmina	1997 CW_{5}	Carolowilhelmina	February 6, 1997	Kleť	M. Tichý, Z. Moravec	EOS	4.6 km	MPC · JPL
31093	1997 CE_{28}	—	February 6, 1997	Xinglong	SCAP	THM	9.4 km	MPC · JPL
31094	1997 CN_{28}	—	February 14, 1997	Xinglong	SCAP	CYB	10 km	MPC · JPL
31095 Buneiou	1997 DH	Buneiou	February 27, 1997	Chichibu	N. Satō	EOS	6.1 km	MPC · JPL
31096	1997 GH_{14}	—	April 3, 1997	Socorro	LINEAR	·	11 km	MPC · JPL
31097 Nucciomula	1997 JM_{11}	Nucciomula	May 3, 1997	La Silla	E. W. Elst	3:2	15 km	MPC · JPL
31098 Frankhill	1997 LQ_{2}	Frankhill	June 9, 1997	Goodricke-Pigott	R. A. Tucker	PHO	2.8 km	MPC · JPL
31099	1997 MF_{4}	—	June 28, 1997	Socorro	LINEAR	·	2.0 km	MPC · JPL
31100	1997 ML_{4}	—	June 28, 1997	Socorro	LINEAR	·	2.6 km	MPC · JPL

== 31101–31200 ==
back to top

Designation			Discovery			Properties		Ref
Permanent	Provisional	Named after	Date	Site	Discoverer(s)	Category	Diam.	Ref
31101	1997 NM_{1}	—	July 2, 1997	Kitt Peak	Spacewatch	NYS	1.8 km	MPC · JPL
31102	1997 NP_{2}	—	July 4, 1997	Majorca	R. Pacheco, Á. López J.	·	2.2 km	MPC · JPL
31103 Elenagarcía	1997 OE_{2}	Elenagarcía	July 29, 1997	Majorca	Á. López J., R. Pacheco	ERI	3.4 km	MPC · JPL
31104 Annanetrebko	1997 OK_{2}	Annanetrebko	July 30, 1997	Caussols	ODAS	(2076)	2.6 km	MPC · JPL
31105 Oguniyamagata	1997 OW_{2}	Oguniyamagata	July 27, 1997	Nanyo	T. Okuni	·	3.5 km	MPC · JPL
31106	1997 PU_{2}	—	August 12, 1997	Kleť	Kleť	PHO	3.4 km	MPC · JPL
31107	1997 PS_{3}	—	August 5, 1997	Xinglong	SCAP	·	1.9 km	MPC · JPL
31108	1997 PW_{3}	—	August 10, 1997	Xinglong	SCAP	V	2.3 km	MPC · JPL
31109 Janpalouš	1997 PL_{4}	Janpalouš	August 14, 1997	Kleť	M. Tichý, Z. Moravec	V	3.6 km	MPC · JPL
31110 Clapas	1997 PN_{4}	Clapas	August 13, 1997	Pises	B. Gaillard, J.-M. Lopez	·	2.1 km	MPC · JPL
31111	1997 PN_{5}	—	August 11, 1997	Nachi-Katsuura	Y. Shimizu, T. Urata	EUN	5.2 km	MPC · JPL
31112	1997 PQ_{5}	—	August 9, 1997	Lake Clear	Williams, K. A.	·	1.6 km	MPC · JPL
31113 Stull	1997 QC	Stull	August 19, 1997	Alfred University	DeGraff, D. R., Weaver, J. S.	·	2.1 km	MPC · JPL
31114	1997 QB_{1}	—	August 28, 1997	Kleť	Z. Moravec	·	1.8 km	MPC · JPL
31115	1997 QF_{4}	—	August 28, 1997	Xinglong	SCAP	·	3.4 km	MPC · JPL
31116	1997 QM_{4}	—	August 29, 1997	Majorca	Á. López J., R. Pacheco	·	2.3 km	MPC · JPL
31117	1997 QF_{5}	—	August 25, 1997	Reedy Creek	J. Broughton	·	3.0 km	MPC · JPL
31118	1997 RN_{1}	—	September 1, 1997	Xinglong	SCAP	·	2.0 km	MPC · JPL
31119	1997 RP_{1}	—	September 3, 1997	Gekko	T. Kagawa, T. Urata	·	3.3 km	MPC · JPL
31120	1997 RT_{8}	—	September 12, 1997	Xinglong	SCAP	MAS	2.1 km	MPC · JPL
31121	1997 RD_{10}	—	September 13, 1997	Xinglong	SCAP	(5)	3.1 km	MPC · JPL
31122 Brooktaylor	1997 SD	Brooktaylor	September 21, 1997	Prescott	P. G. Comba	·	2.6 km	MPC · JPL
31123	1997 SU	—	September 16, 1997	Xinglong	SCAP	·	3.2 km	MPC · JPL
31124 Slavíček	1997 SJ_{1}	Slavíček	September 22, 1997	Kleť	M. Tichý	·	2.9 km	MPC · JPL
31125	1997 SL_{1}	—	September 22, 1997	Rand	G. R. Viscome	·	2.6 km	MPC · JPL
31126	1997 SG_{2}	—	September 19, 1997	Dynic	A. Sugie	·	4.2 km	MPC · JPL
31127	1997 SL_{4}	—	September 27, 1997	Oizumi	T. Kobayashi	·	3.9 km	MPC · JPL
31128	1997 SL_{9}	—	September 27, 1997	Kitt Peak	Spacewatch	(5)	2.1 km	MPC · JPL
31129 Langyatai	1997 SR_{10}	Langyatai	September 26, 1997	Xinglong	SCAP	·	4.4 km	MPC · JPL
31130	1997 SS_{10}	—	September 26, 1997	Xinglong	SCAP	·	3.3 km	MPC · JPL
31131	1997 SV_{10}	—	September 28, 1997	Xinglong	SCAP	·	2.8 km	MPC · JPL
31132	1997 SD_{13}	—	September 28, 1997	Kitt Peak	Spacewatch	V	2.2 km	MPC · JPL
31133	1997 SZ_{15}	—	September 27, 1997	Caussols	ODAS	·	5.7 km	MPC · JPL
31134 Zurria	1997 SF_{18}	Zurria	September 27, 1997	Bologna	San Vittore	NYS	1.9 km	MPC · JPL
31135	1997 SN_{24}	—	September 30, 1997	Kitt Peak	Spacewatch	PHO	4.4 km	MPC · JPL
31136	1997 SN_{31}	—	September 28, 1997	Kitt Peak	Spacewatch	·	3.1 km	MPC · JPL
31137	1997 SQ_{32}	—	September 30, 1997	Xinglong	SCAP	NYS	4.1 km	MPC · JPL
31138	1997 SJ_{33}	—	September 29, 1997	Xinglong	SCAP	·	3.0 km	MPC · JPL
31139 Garnavich	1997 SJ_{34}	Garnavich	September 25, 1997	Ondřejov	Ondrejov	·	2.0 km	MPC · JPL
31140	1997 TC_{9}	—	October 2, 1997	Kitt Peak	Spacewatch	·	2.0 km	MPC · JPL
31141	1997 TN_{18}	—	October 3, 1997	Xinglong	SCAP	NYS	1.9 km	MPC · JPL
31142	1997 TT_{22}	—	October 5, 1997	Kitt Peak	Spacewatch	·	5.1 km	MPC · JPL
31143	1997 TN_{24}	—	October 8, 1997	Xinglong	SCAP	·	3.9 km	MPC · JPL
31144	1997 TM_{26}	—	October 7, 1997	Church Stretton	S. P. Laurie	·	3.1 km	MPC · JPL
31145	1997 UK	—	October 19, 1997	Kleť	Kleť	·	3.6 km	MPC · JPL
31146	1997 UV_{3}	—	October 26, 1997	Oizumi	T. Kobayashi	NYS	5.7 km	MPC · JPL
31147 Miriquidi	1997 UA_{4}	Miriquidi	October 22, 1997	Drebach	J. Kandler	·	3.5 km	MPC · JPL
31148	1997 UO_{8}	—	October 23, 1997	Kushiro	S. Ueda, H. Kaneda	MAR	7.2 km	MPC · JPL
31149	1997 UE_{13}	—	October 23, 1997	Kitt Peak	Spacewatch	NYS	2.5 km	MPC · JPL
31150	1997 UT_{20}	—	October 23, 1997	Xinglong	SCAP	fast	2.3 km	MPC · JPL
31151 Sajichugaku	1997 UM_{21}	Sajichugaku	October 29, 1997	Saji	Saji	·	2.3 km	MPC · JPL
31152 Daishinsai	1997 UV_{21}	Daishinsai	October 29, 1997	Nanyo	T. Okuni	·	8.5 km	MPC · JPL
31153 Enricaparri	1997 UP_{22}	Enricaparri	October 26, 1997	Cima Ekar	G. Forti, M. Tombelli	(2076)	3.1 km	MPC · JPL
31154	1997 VJ	—	November 1, 1997	Oizumi	T. Kobayashi	PHO	3.3 km	MPC · JPL
31155	1997 VG_{2}	—	November 1, 1997	Oizumi	T. Kobayashi	·	3.3 km	MPC · JPL
31156	1997 WO	—	November 18, 1997	Oizumi	T. Kobayashi	NYS ·	6.0 km	MPC · JPL
31157	1997 WK_{1}	—	November 19, 1997	Xinglong	SCAP	PAD	5.5 km	MPC · JPL
31158	1997 WE_{3}	—	November 23, 1997	Oizumi	T. Kobayashi	·	5.7 km	MPC · JPL
31159	1997 WB_{6}	—	November 23, 1997	Kitt Peak	Spacewatch	·	4.0 km	MPC · JPL
31160	1997 WQ_{9}	—	November 21, 1997	Kitt Peak	Spacewatch	NYS	3.6 km	MPC · JPL
31161	1997 WR_{11}	—	November 22, 1997	Kitt Peak	Spacewatch	·	3.3 km	MPC · JPL
31162	1997 WB_{13}	—	November 23, 1997	Kitt Peak	Spacewatch	·	4.7 km	MPC · JPL
31163	1997 WR_{18}	—	November 23, 1997	Kitt Peak	Spacewatch	·	3.0 km	MPC · JPL
31164	1997 WM_{35}	—	November 29, 1997	Socorro	LINEAR	NYS	3.8 km	MPC · JPL
31165	1997 WN_{43}	—	November 29, 1997	Socorro	LINEAR	·	3.9 km	MPC · JPL
31166	1997 WX_{45}	—	November 26, 1997	Socorro	LINEAR	·	2.4 km	MPC · JPL
31167	1997 WL_{46}	—	November 26, 1997	Socorro	LINEAR	NYS	4.0 km	MPC · JPL
31168	1997 WM_{49}	—	November 29, 1997	Socorro	LINEAR	·	4.8 km	MPC · JPL
31169	1997 WV_{53}	—	November 29, 1997	Socorro	LINEAR	·	3.7 km	MPC · JPL
31170	1997 WO_{58}	—	November 26, 1997	La Silla	Uppsala-DLR Trojan Survey	·	4.5 km	MPC · JPL
31171	1997 XB	—	December 2, 1997	Oizumi	T. Kobayashi	·	2.2 km	MPC · JPL
31172	1997 XQ	—	December 3, 1997	Oizumi	T. Kobayashi	(5)	2.5 km	MPC · JPL
31173	1997 XF_{1}	—	December 4, 1997	Socorro	LINEAR	H · slow	1.6 km	MPC · JPL
31174 Rozelot	1997 XW_{4}	Rozelot	December 6, 1997	Caussols	ODAS	·	3.4 km	MPC · JPL
31175 Erikafuchs	1997 XV_{7}	Erikafuchs	December 7, 1997	Caussols	ODAS	EUN	6.2 km	MPC · JPL
31176	1997 XL_{9}	—	December 2, 1997	Nachi-Katsuura	Y. Shimizu, T. Urata	V	3.7 km	MPC · JPL
31177	1997 XH_{11}	—	December 13, 1997	Xinglong	SCAP	slow	5.4 km	MPC · JPL
31178	1997 XK_{13}	—	December 4, 1997	Kitt Peak	Spacewatch	·	13 km	MPC · JPL
31179 Gongju	1997 YR_{2}	Gongju	December 21, 1997	Chichibu	N. Satō	NYS	4.7 km	MPC · JPL
31180	1997 YX_{3}	—	December 22, 1997	Xinglong	SCAP	·	6.2 km	MPC · JPL
31181	1997 YY_{3}	—	December 22, 1997	Xinglong	SCAP	·	4.4 km	MPC · JPL
31182	1997 YZ_{3}	—	December 22, 1997	Xinglong	SCAP	H · slow	1.9 km	MPC · JPL
31183	1997 YT_{4}	—	December 25, 1997	Haleakala	NEAT	·	2.1 km	MPC · JPL
31184	1997 YZ_{4}	—	December 26, 1997	Sudbury	D. di Cicco	·	2.9 km	MPC · JPL
31185	1997 YK_{5}	—	December 25, 1997	Oizumi	T. Kobayashi	·	8.1 km	MPC · JPL
31186	1997 YQ_{5}	—	December 25, 1997	Oizumi	T. Kobayashi	·	4.0 km	MPC · JPL
31187	1997 YK_{7}	—	December 27, 1997	Oizumi	T. Kobayashi	ADE	8.1 km	MPC · JPL
31188	1997 YM_{7}	—	December 27, 1997	Oizumi	T. Kobayashi	GEF	3.7 km	MPC · JPL
31189 Tricomi	1997 YZ_{7}	Tricomi	December 27, 1997	Prescott	P. G. Comba	·	3.1 km	MPC · JPL
31190 Toussaint	1997 YB_{12}	Toussaint	December 27, 1997	Goodricke-Pigott	R. A. Tucker	MAR	4.5 km	MPC · JPL
31191	1997 YD_{15}	—	December 28, 1997	Kitt Peak	Spacewatch	·	4.9 km	MPC · JPL
31192 Aigoual	1997 YH_{16}	Aigoual	December 29, 1997	Pises	Pises	·	7.1 km	MPC · JPL
31193	1997 YP_{16}	—	December 31, 1997	Nachi-Katsuura	Y. Shimizu, T. Urata	·	4.8 km	MPC · JPL
31194	1997 YQ_{16}	—	December 24, 1997	Xinglong	SCAP	·	4.5 km	MPC · JPL
31195	1997 YG_{18}	—	December 29, 1997	Xinglong	SCAP	TEL	3.9 km	MPC · JPL
31196 Yulong	1997 YL_{18}	Yulong	December 24, 1997	Xinglong	Xinglong	·	5.7 km	MPC · JPL
31197	1997 YS_{19}	—	December 31, 1997	Socorro	LINEAR	·	2.7 km	MPC · JPL
31198	1998 AB_{1}	—	January 5, 1998	Oizumi	T. Kobayashi	·	7.3 km	MPC · JPL
31199	1998 AK_{3}	—	January 5, 1998	Chichibu	N. Satō	AGN	4.4 km	MPC · JPL
31200	1998 AL_{4}	—	January 6, 1998	Kitt Peak	Spacewatch	·	4.1 km	MPC · JPL

== 31201–31300 ==
back to top

Designation			Discovery			Properties		Ref
Permanent	Provisional	Named after	Date	Site	Discoverer(s)	Category	Diam.	Ref
31201 Michellegrand	1998 AT_{5}	Michellegrand	January 8, 1998	Caussols	ODAS	EOS	7.3 km	MPC · JPL
31202	1998 AX_{7}	—	January 2, 1998	Socorro	LINEAR	EUN	5.0 km	MPC · JPL
31203 Hersman	1998 AO_{9}	Hersman	January 6, 1998	Anderson Mesa	M. W. Buie	KOR	3.7 km	MPC · JPL
31204	1998 AA_{10}	—	January 15, 1998	Kleť	Kleť	MAR	4.4 km	MPC · JPL
31205	1998 BW	—	January 19, 1998	Oizumi	T. Kobayashi	·	14 km	MPC · JPL
31206	1998 BF_{1}	—	January 19, 1998	Oizumi	T. Kobayashi	·	7.9 km	MPC · JPL
31207	1998 BM_{1}	—	January 19, 1998	Oizumi	T. Kobayashi	HYG	7.7 km	MPC · JPL
31208	1998 BU_{1}	—	January 19, 1998	Oizumi	T. Kobayashi	EUN	4.2 km	MPC · JPL
31209	1998 BZ_{6}	—	January 24, 1998	Oizumi	T. Kobayashi	·	8.2 km	MPC · JPL
31210	1998 BX_{7}	—	January 24, 1998	Haleakala	NEAT	AMO +1km	1.9 km	MPC · JPL
31211	1998 BW_{8}	—	January 18, 1998	Xinglong	SCAP	HYG	9.4 km	MPC · JPL
31212	1998 BZ_{8}	—	January 18, 1998	Xinglong	SCAP	·	6.2 km	MPC · JPL
31213	1998 BK_{9}	—	January 24, 1998	Haleakala	NEAT	·	9.1 km	MPC · JPL
31214	1998 BZ_{9}	—	January 22, 1998	Kitt Peak	Spacewatch	·	3.2 km	MPC · JPL
31215	1998 BN_{10}	—	January 26, 1998	Kleť	Kleť	·	5.3 km	MPC · JPL
31216	1998 BL_{12}	—	January 23, 1998	Socorro	LINEAR	·	7.4 km	MPC · JPL
31217	1998 BD_{15}	—	January 24, 1998	Haleakala	NEAT	·	8.5 km	MPC · JPL
31218	1998 BZ_{20}	—	January 22, 1998	Kitt Peak	Spacewatch	KOR	3.9 km	MPC · JPL
31219	1998 BW_{24}	—	January 28, 1998	Oizumi	T. Kobayashi	TIR	5.2 km	MPC · JPL
31220	1998 BA_{26}	—	January 29, 1998	Oizumi	T. Kobayashi	JUN	3.6 km	MPC · JPL
31221	1998 BP_{26}	—	January 28, 1998	Haleakala	NEAT	AMO +1km	1.3 km	MPC · JPL
31222	1998 BD_{30}	—	January 26, 1998	Gekko	T. Kagawa, T. Urata	·	5.1 km	MPC · JPL
31223	1998 BJ_{30}	—	January 28, 1998	Bédoin	P. Antonini	·	4.2 km	MPC · JPL
31224	1998 BP_{33}	—	January 31, 1998	Oizumi	T. Kobayashi	GEF	4.1 km	MPC · JPL
31225	1998 BH_{35}	—	January 27, 1998	Kitt Peak	Spacewatch	·	3.4 km	MPC · JPL
31226	1998 BZ_{40}	—	January 24, 1998	Haleakala	NEAT	THM	7.7 km	MPC · JPL
31227	1998 BC_{41}	—	January 24, 1998	Haleakala	NEAT	EUN	9.6 km	MPC · JPL
31228	1998 BR_{45}	—	January 24, 1998	Haleakala	NEAT	·	3.3 km	MPC · JPL
31229	1998 BD_{46}	—	January 26, 1998	Kitt Peak	Spacewatch	ADE	5.7 km	MPC · JPL
31230 Tuyouyou	1998 BB_{47}	Tuyouyou	January 18, 1998	Xinglong	SCAP	EUN	5.6 km	MPC · JPL
31231 Uthmann	1998 CA	Uthmann	February 1, 1998	Drebach	J. Kandler, G. Lehmann	·	5.9 km	MPC · JPL
31232 Slavonice	1998 CF	Slavonice	February 1, 1998	Kleť	J. Tichá, M. Tichý	·	7.3 km	MPC · JPL
31233	1998 CG_{1}	—	February 1, 1998	Xinglong	SCAP	EOS	4.7 km	MPC · JPL
31234 Bea	1998 CL_{1}	Bea	February 7, 1998	Modra	A. Galád, Pravda, A.	·	4.6 km	MPC · JPL
31235	1998 CE_{3}	—	February 6, 1998	La Silla	E. W. Elst	EOS	6.6 km	MPC · JPL
31236	1998 CC_{4}	—	February 14, 1998	Farra d'Isonzo	Farra d'Isonzo	EOS · slow	6.7 km	MPC · JPL
31237	1998 CY_{4}	—	February 6, 1998	La Silla	E. W. Elst	KOR	4.4 km	MPC · JPL
31238 Kroměříž	1998 DT_{1}	Kroměříž	February 21, 1998	Kleť	J. Tichá, M. Tichý	CYB	7.3 km	MPC · JPL
31239 Michaeljames	1998 DV_{1}	Michaeljames	February 21, 1998	Cocoa	I. P. Griffin	EUN	4.5 km	MPC · JPL
31240 Katrianne	1998 DB_{2}	Katrianne	February 20, 1998	Drebach	G. Lehmann	DOR	8.6 km	MPC · JPL
31241	1998 DK_{2}	—	February 20, 1998	Caussols	ODAS	·	7.5 km	MPC · JPL
31242	1998 DO_{10}	—	February 23, 1998	Haleakala	NEAT	·	10 km	MPC · JPL
31243	1998 DW_{10}	—	February 16, 1998	Xinglong	SCAP	EOS	6.9 km	MPC · JPL
31244 Guidomonzino	1998 DG_{11}	Guidomonzino	February 19, 1998	Sormano	P. Sicoli, A. Testa	·	7.3 km	MPC · JPL
31245	1998 DR_{11}	—	February 24, 1998	Haleakala	NEAT	KOR	4.8 km	MPC · JPL
31246	1998 DZ_{12}	—	February 24, 1998	Zeno	T. Stafford	RAF	3.8 km	MPC · JPL
31247	1998 DD_{13}	—	February 22, 1998	Haleakala	NEAT	·	9.8 km	MPC · JPL
31248	1998 DH_{13}	—	February 24, 1998	Haleakala	NEAT	·	7.2 km	MPC · JPL
31249 Renéefleming	1998 DF_{14}	Renéefleming	February 27, 1998	Caussols	ODAS	2:1J	7.0 km	MPC · JPL
31250	1998 DR_{14}	—	February 22, 1998	Haleakala	NEAT	EOS	5.2 km	MPC · JPL
31251	1998 DU_{14}	—	February 22, 1998	Haleakala	NEAT	EOS	6.4 km	MPC · JPL
31252	1998 DA_{15}	—	February 22, 1998	Haleakala	NEAT	·	10 km	MPC · JPL
31253	1998 DQ_{21}	—	February 22, 1998	Kitt Peak	Spacewatch	·	4.1 km	MPC · JPL
31254 Totucciogrisanti	1998 DK_{23}	Totucciogrisanti	February 27, 1998	Sormano	M. Cavagna, P. Chiavenna	·	10 km	MPC · JPL
31255	1998 DL_{27}	—	February 27, 1998	Bédoin	P. Antonini	HYG	8.0 km	MPC · JPL
31256	1998 DM_{32}	—	February 22, 1998	Xinglong	SCAP	·	6.2 km	MPC · JPL
31257	1998 DG_{35}	—	February 27, 1998	La Silla	E. W. Elst	EOS	5.8 km	MPC · JPL
31258	1998 EE	—	March 1, 1998	Oizumi	T. Kobayashi	EOS	8.6 km	MPC · JPL
31259	1998 EB_{3}	—	March 1, 1998	Xinglong	SCAP	·	7.0 km	MPC · JPL
31260	1998 EE_{6}	—	March 2, 1998	Nachi-Katsuura	Y. Shimizu, T. Urata	·	6.1 km	MPC · JPL
31261	1998 EF_{8}	—	March 2, 1998	Xinglong	SCAP	DOR	8.6 km	MPC · JPL
31262	1998 ES_{8}	—	March 5, 1998	Xinglong	SCAP	MRX ·	3.6 km	MPC · JPL
31263	1998 EG_{9}	—	March 8, 1998	Xinglong	SCAP	·	5.4 km	MPC · JPL
31264	1998 EQ_{11}	—	March 1, 1998	La Silla	E. W. Elst	·	7.8 km	MPC · JPL
31265	1998 EC_{13}	—	March 1, 1998	La Silla	E. W. Elst	·	11 km	MPC · JPL
31266 Tournefort	1998 EZ_{13}	Tournefort	March 1, 1998	La Silla	E. W. Elst	·	8.1 km	MPC · JPL
31267 Kuldiga	1998 ES_{14}	Kuldiga	March 1, 1998	La Silla	E. W. Elst	EOS	10 km	MPC · JPL
31268 Welty	1998 FA	Welty	March 16, 1998	Cocoa	I. P. Griffin	·	4.2 km	MPC · JPL
31269	1998 FO	—	March 18, 1998	Kitt Peak	Spacewatch	·	6.5 km	MPC · JPL
31270	1998 FP_{14}	—	March 26, 1998	Caussols	ODAS	EOS	7.4 km	MPC · JPL
31271 Nallino	1998 FH_{16}	Nallino	March 25, 1998	Bologna	San Vittore	·	8.9 km	MPC · JPL
31272 Makosinski	1998 FE_{18}	Makosinski	March 20, 1998	Socorro	LINEAR	THM	7.4 km	MPC · JPL
31273	1998 FY_{23}	—	March 20, 1998	Socorro	LINEAR	EOS	5.1 km	MPC · JPL
31274	1998 FE_{24}	—	March 20, 1998	Socorro	LINEAR	HYG	9.1 km	MPC · JPL
31275	1998 FN_{25}	—	March 20, 1998	Socorro	LINEAR	EOS	4.1 km	MPC · JPL
31276 Calvinrieder	1998 FG_{28}	Calvinrieder	March 20, 1998	Socorro	LINEAR	KOR	3.2 km	MPC · JPL
31277	1998 FK_{28}	—	March 20, 1998	Socorro	LINEAR	·	8.2 km	MPC · JPL
31278	1998 FK_{30}	—	March 20, 1998	Socorro	LINEAR	·	5.3 km	MPC · JPL
31279	1998 FQ_{31}	—	March 20, 1998	Socorro	LINEAR	THM	8.1 km	MPC · JPL
31280	1998 FG_{33}	—	March 20, 1998	Socorro	LINEAR	EOS	7.7 km	MPC · JPL
31281 Stothers	1998 FK_{34}	Stothers	March 20, 1998	Socorro	LINEAR	·	5.8 km	MPC · JPL
31282 Nicoleticea	1998 FD_{35}	Nicoleticea	March 20, 1998	Socorro	LINEAR	·	6.8 km	MPC · JPL
31283 Wanruomeng	1998 FD_{40}	Wanruomeng	March 20, 1998	Socorro	LINEAR	·	3.3 km	MPC · JPL
31284	1998 FN_{48}	—	March 20, 1998	Socorro	LINEAR	HIL · 3:2	20 km	MPC · JPL
31285	1998 FK_{51}	—	March 20, 1998	Socorro	LINEAR	·	12 km	MPC · JPL
31286	1998 FD_{54}	—	March 20, 1998	Socorro	LINEAR	EOS	5.3 km	MPC · JPL
31287	1998 FK_{58}	—	March 20, 1998	Socorro	LINEAR	EOS	7.2 km	MPC · JPL
31288	1998 FZ_{59}	—	March 20, 1998	Socorro	LINEAR	EOS	7.1 km	MPC · JPL
31289	1998 FN_{62}	—	March 20, 1998	Socorro	LINEAR	EOS	6.6 km	MPC · JPL
31290	1998 FG_{63}	—	March 20, 1998	Socorro	LINEAR	·	5.1 km	MPC · JPL
31291 Yaoyue	1998 FH_{64}	Yaoyue	March 20, 1998	Socorro	LINEAR	·	7.6 km	MPC · JPL
31292	1998 FK_{66}	—	March 20, 1998	Socorro	LINEAR	THM	7.1 km	MPC · JPL
31293	1998 FP_{70}	—	March 20, 1998	Socorro	LINEAR	(11097) · CYB · 2:1J	8.0 km	MPC · JPL
31294	1998 FJ_{71}	—	March 20, 1998	Socorro	LINEAR	EOS	4.2 km	MPC · JPL
31295	1998 FF_{72}	—	March 20, 1998	Socorro	LINEAR	·	7.5 km	MPC · JPL
31296 Matthewclement	1998 FY_{73}	Matthewclement	March 22, 1998	Anderson Mesa	LONEOS	EOS	9.5 km	MPC · JPL
31297	1998 FZ_{74}	—	March 24, 1998	Socorro	LINEAR	EOS	7.2 km	MPC · JPL
31298 Chantaihei	1998 FB_{77}	Chantaihei	March 24, 1998	Socorro	LINEAR	·	4.4 km	MPC · JPL
31299	1998 FJ_{80}	—	March 24, 1998	Socorro	LINEAR	·	8.4 km	MPC · JPL
31300	1998 FZ_{82}	—	March 24, 1998	Socorro	LINEAR	·	13 km	MPC · JPL

== 31301–31400 ==
back to top

Designation			Discovery			Properties		Ref
Permanent	Provisional	Named after	Date	Site	Discoverer(s)	Category	Diam.	Ref
31301	1998 FE_{92}	—	March 24, 1998	Socorro	LINEAR	EOS	7.8 km	MPC · JPL
31302	1998 FT_{95}	—	March 31, 1998	Socorro	LINEAR	EOS	5.0 km	MPC · JPL
31303	1998 FO_{99}	—	March 31, 1998	Socorro	LINEAR	EOS	6.6 km	MPC · JPL
31304	1998 FE_{103}	—	March 31, 1998	Socorro	LINEAR	EOS	5.3 km	MPC · JPL
31305	1998 FL_{104}	—	March 31, 1998	Socorro	LINEAR	EOS	6.1 km	MPC · JPL
31306	1998 FZ_{104}	—	March 31, 1998	Socorro	LINEAR	EOS	8.4 km	MPC · JPL
31307	1998 FK_{105}	—	March 31, 1998	Socorro	LINEAR	LIX	14 km	MPC · JPL
31308	1998 FK_{113}	—	March 31, 1998	Socorro	LINEAR	slow	7.8 km	MPC · JPL
31309	1998 FJ_{116}	—	March 31, 1998	Socorro	LINEAR	URS	12 km	MPC · JPL
31310	1998 FP_{118}	—	March 31, 1998	Socorro	LINEAR	·	5.6 km	MPC · JPL
31311	1998 FX_{118}	—	March 31, 1998	Socorro	LINEAR	·	12 km	MPC · JPL
31312 Fangerhai	1998 FY_{118}	Fangerhai	March 31, 1998	Socorro	LINEAR	·	5.9 km	MPC · JPL
31313 Kanwingyi	1998 FO_{119}	Kanwingyi	March 20, 1998	Socorro	LINEAR	·	4.8 km	MPC · JPL
31314	1998 FS_{120}	—	March 20, 1998	Socorro	LINEAR	·	7.4 km	MPC · JPL
31315	1998 FS_{132}	—	March 20, 1998	Socorro	LINEAR	·	14 km	MPC · JPL
31316	1998 GZ_{7}	—	April 2, 1998	Socorro	LINEAR	·	13 km	MPC · JPL
31317	1998 GL_{8}	—	April 2, 1998	Socorro	LINEAR	·	6.2 km	MPC · JPL
31318	1998 GQ_{10}	—	April 4, 1998	Fair Oaks Ranch	J. V. McClusky	·	2.8 km	MPC · JPL
31319 Vespucci	1998 HD_{2}	Vespucci	April 20, 1998	Colleverde	V. S. Casulli	URS ·	13 km	MPC · JPL
31320	1998 HX_{2}	—	April 21, 1998	Socorro	LINEAR	H	2.0 km	MPC · JPL
31321	1998 HD_{3}	—	April 21, 1998	Kleť	Kleť	HYG	7.6 km	MPC · JPL
31322	1998 HS_{14}	—	April 17, 1998	Kitt Peak	Spacewatch	THM	8.3 km	MPC · JPL
31323 Lysá hora	1998 HC_{29}	Lysá hora	April 27, 1998	Ondřejov	P. Pravec	·	5.5 km	MPC · JPL
31324 Jiřímrázek	1998 HR_{31}	Jiřímrázek	April 27, 1998	Ondřejov	L. Kotková	·	6.0 km	MPC · JPL
31325	1998 HN_{33}	—	April 20, 1998	Socorro	LINEAR	EOS	9.5 km	MPC · JPL
31326	1998 HF_{34}	—	April 20, 1998	Socorro	LINEAR	EOS	5.8 km	MPC · JPL
31327	1998 HM_{34}	—	April 20, 1998	Socorro	LINEAR	·	7.1 km	MPC · JPL
31328	1998 HV_{47}	—	April 20, 1998	Socorro	LINEAR	HYG	7.0 km	MPC · JPL
31329	1998 HU_{57}	—	April 21, 1998	Socorro	LINEAR	·	11 km	MPC · JPL
31330	1998 HB_{84}	—	April 21, 1998	Socorro	LINEAR	·	11 km	MPC · JPL
31331	1998 HU_{92}	—	April 21, 1998	Socorro	LINEAR	EOS	5.0 km	MPC · JPL
31332	1998 HC_{101}	—	April 21, 1998	Socorro	LINEAR	·	7.4 km	MPC · JPL
31333	1998 HD_{101}	—	April 21, 1998	Socorro	LINEAR	·	10 km	MPC · JPL
31334	1998 HW_{102}	—	April 25, 1998	La Silla	E. W. Elst	THM	10 km	MPC · JPL
31335	1998 HY_{124}	—	April 23, 1998	Socorro	LINEAR	·	20 km	MPC · JPL
31336 Chenyuhsin	1998 HT_{129}	Chenyuhsin	April 19, 1998	Socorro	LINEAR	·	6.1 km	MPC · JPL
31337	1998 HA_{134}	—	April 19, 1998	Socorro	LINEAR	EOS	5.2 km	MPC · JPL
31338 Lipperhey	1998 HX_{147}	Lipperhey	April 25, 1998	La Silla	E. W. Elst	HIL · 3:2 · (3561)	13 km	MPC · JPL
31339	1998 KY_{30}	—	May 22, 1998	Socorro	LINEAR	2:1J (unstable)	11 km	MPC · JPL
31340	1998 KW_{53}	—	May 23, 1998	Socorro	LINEAR	·	16 km	MPC · JPL
31341	1998 KH_{55}	—	May 23, 1998	Socorro	LINEAR	·	6.8 km	MPC · JPL
31342	1998 MU_{31}	—	June 24, 1998	Socorro	LINEAR	L5	47 km	MPC · JPL
31343	1998 NT	—	July 12, 1998	Burlington	Handley, T.	H	1.8 km	MPC · JPL
31344 Agathon	1998 OM_{12}	Agathon	July 30, 1998	Reedy Creek	J. Broughton	L5	41 km	MPC · JPL
31345	1998 PG	—	August 3, 1998	Anderson Mesa	LONEOS	AMO +1km · moon	1.1 km	MPC · JPL
31346	1998 PB_{1}	—	August 15, 1998	Socorro	LINEAR	AMO +1km · moon	1.3 km	MPC · JPL
31347	1998 QV_{90}	—	August 28, 1998	Socorro	LINEAR	·	2.6 km	MPC · JPL
31348	1998 QF_{92}	—	August 28, 1998	Socorro	LINEAR	H	2.0 km	MPC · JPL
31349 Uria-Monzon	1998 SV	Uria-Monzon	September 16, 1998	Caussols	ODAS	·	1.2 km	MPC · JPL
31350	1998 SF_{2}	—	September 17, 1998	Woomera	F. B. Zoltowski	·	2.1 km	MPC · JPL
31351	1998 SD_{24}	—	September 26, 1998	Socorro	LINEAR	H	1.5 km	MPC · JPL
31352	1998 SP_{135}	—	September 26, 1998	Socorro	LINEAR	·	1.7 km	MPC · JPL
31353	1998 TE	—	October 2, 1998	Gekko	T. Kagawa	·	2.2 km	MPC · JPL
31354	1998 TR_{3}	—	October 14, 1998	Socorro	LINEAR	H	3.0 km	MPC · JPL
31355	1998 TT_{6}	—	October 15, 1998	Višnjan Observatory	K. Korlević	V	4.0 km	MPC · JPL
31356	1998 TN_{10}	—	October 12, 1998	Kitt Peak	Spacewatch	·	1.5 km	MPC · JPL
31357	1998 UP_{20}	—	October 28, 1998	Višnjan Observatory	K. Korlević	·	3.3 km	MPC · JPL
31358 Garethcollins	1998 UR_{23}	Garethcollins	October 17, 1998	Anderson Mesa	LONEOS	·	3.3 km	MPC · JPL
31359	1998 UA_{28}	—	October 29, 1998	Socorro	LINEAR	PHO	6.4 km	MPC · JPL
31360 Huangyihsuan	1998 VV_{14}	Huangyihsuan	November 10, 1998	Socorro	LINEAR	·	2.5 km	MPC · JPL
31361	1998 VQ_{29}	—	November 10, 1998	Socorro	LINEAR	EUN	6.9 km	MPC · JPL
31362	1998 VU_{41}	—	November 14, 1998	Kitt Peak	Spacewatch	·	2.8 km	MPC · JPL
31363 Shulga	1998 VS_{44}	Shulga	November 14, 1998	Anderson Mesa	LONEOS	NYS	1.9 km	MPC · JPL
31364	1998 WM_{6}	—	November 24, 1998	Kleť	Kleť	·	1.8 km	MPC · JPL
31365	1998 WF_{7}	—	November 23, 1998	Oohira	T. Urata	·	3.0 km	MPC · JPL
31366	1998 WF_{8}	—	November 25, 1998	Oizumi	T. Kobayashi	V	2.5 km	MPC · JPL
31367	1998 WB_{9}	—	November 25, 1998	Socorro	LINEAR	·	4.2 km	MPC · JPL
31368	1998 WW_{23}	—	November 25, 1998	Socorro	LINEAR	·	15 km	MPC · JPL
31369	1998 WX_{26}	—	November 16, 1998	Kitt Peak	Spacewatch	·	1.4 km	MPC · JPL
31370	1998 XS_{3}	—	December 9, 1998	Oizumi	T. Kobayashi	·	8.4 km	MPC · JPL
31371	1998 XN_{10}	—	December 15, 1998	Caussols	ODAS	NYS	1.8 km	MPC · JPL
31372	1998 XN_{11}	—	December 13, 1998	Oizumi	T. Kobayashi	·	3.7 km	MPC · JPL
31373	1998 XN_{12}	—	December 14, 1998	Xinglong	SCAP	EUN	6.0 km	MPC · JPL
31374 Hruskova	1998 XZ_{41}	Hruskova	December 14, 1998	Socorro	LINEAR	·	1.8 km	MPC · JPL
31375 Krystufek	1998 XP_{46}	Krystufek	December 14, 1998	Socorro	LINEAR	·	2.3 km	MPC · JPL
31376 Leobauersfeld	1998 XB_{48}	Leobauersfeld	December 14, 1998	Socorro	LINEAR	·	2.2 km	MPC · JPL
31377 Kleinwort	1998 XG_{50}	Kleinwort	December 14, 1998	Socorro	LINEAR	·	5.2 km	MPC · JPL
31378 Neidinger	1998 XZ_{50}	Neidinger	December 14, 1998	Socorro	LINEAR	NYS	2.4 km	MPC · JPL
31379	1998 XX_{51}	—	December 14, 1998	Socorro	LINEAR	·	6.8 km	MPC · JPL
31380 Hegyesi	1998 XA_{73}	Hegyesi	December 14, 1998	Socorro	LINEAR	V	2.4 km	MPC · JPL
31381	1998 XW_{86}	—	December 15, 1998	Socorro	LINEAR	·	6.0 km	MPC · JPL
31382	1998 XN_{89}	—	December 15, 1998	Socorro	LINEAR	EUN	6.4 km	MPC · JPL
31383	1998 XJ_{94}	—	December 15, 1998	Socorro	LINEAR	·	4.1 km	MPC · JPL
31384 Joséloisestévez	1998 XE_{96}	Joséloisestévez	December 11, 1998	Mérida	Naranjo, O. A.	·	2.2 km	MPC · JPL
31385 Genovevavázquez	1998 XF_{96}	Genovevavázquez	December 11, 1998	Mérida	Naranjo, O. A.	EUN	4.7 km	MPC · JPL
31386	1998 YG_{1}	—	December 16, 1998	Gekko	T. Kagawa	·	3.0 km	MPC · JPL
31387 Lehoucq	1998 YA_{2}	Lehoucq	December 16, 1998	Caussols	ODAS	·	3.5 km	MPC · JPL
31388	1998 YL_{2}	—	December 17, 1998	Caussols	ODAS	MAS	1.9 km	MPC · JPL
31389 Alexkaplan	1998 YN_{2}	Alexkaplan	December 17, 1998	Caussols	ODAS	NYS	3.0 km	MPC · JPL
31390	1998 YB_{4}	—	December 19, 1998	Oizumi	T. Kobayashi	·	2.1 km	MPC · JPL
31391	1998 YA_{5}	—	December 17, 1998	Caussols	ODAS	·	1.8 km	MPC · JPL
31392	1998 YJ_{5}	—	December 20, 1998	Catalina	CSS	MAR	4.9 km	MPC · JPL
31393	1998 YG_{8}	—	December 24, 1998	Oizumi	T. Kobayashi	·	2.2 km	MPC · JPL
31394	1998 YX_{9}	—	December 25, 1998	Višnjan Observatory	K. Korlević, M. Jurić	·	1.8 km	MPC · JPL
31395	1998 YB_{11}	—	December 18, 1998	Caussols	ODAS	·	2.0 km	MPC · JPL
31396	1998 YQ_{12}	—	December 29, 1998	Oizumi	T. Kobayashi	·	3.0 km	MPC · JPL
31397	1998 YR_{15}	—	December 22, 1998	Kitt Peak	Spacewatch	·	3.1 km	MPC · JPL
31398 Lukedaly	1998 YU_{29}	Lukedaly	December 27, 1998	Anderson Mesa	LONEOS	·	3.5 km	MPC · JPL
31399 Susorney	1998 YF_{30}	Susorney	December 24, 1998	Anderson Mesa	LONEOS	EUN · slow	7.2 km	MPC · JPL
31400 Dakshdua	1998 YY_{31}	Dakshdua	December 16, 1998	Socorro	LINEAR	·	2.5 km	MPC · JPL

== 31401–31500 ==
back to top

Designation			Discovery			Properties		Ref
Permanent	Provisional	Named after	Date	Site	Discoverer(s)	Category	Diam.	Ref
31401	1999 AK	—	January 6, 1999	Višnjan Observatory	K. Korlević	·	9.5 km	MPC · JPL
31402 Negishi	1999 AR	Negishi	January 7, 1999	Oizumi	T. Kobayashi	(194)	9.5 km	MPC · JPL
31403	1999 AV	—	January 7, 1999	Oizumi	T. Kobayashi	·	2.9 km	MPC · JPL
31404	1999 AL_{1}	—	January 7, 1999	Kitt Peak	Spacewatch	·	2.3 km	MPC · JPL
31405	1999 AD_{2}	—	January 9, 1999	Oizumi	T. Kobayashi	·	3.3 km	MPC · JPL
31406	1999 AA_{4}	—	January 10, 1999	Oizumi	T. Kobayashi	·	5.8 km	MPC · JPL
31407	1999 AP_{4}	—	January 11, 1999	Oizumi	T. Kobayashi	MAR	4.4 km	MPC · JPL
31408	1999 AV_{4}	—	January 11, 1999	Oizumi	T. Kobayashi	NYS	3.7 km	MPC · JPL
31409	1999 AB_{5}	—	January 11, 1999	Oizumi	T. Kobayashi	·	4.1 km	MPC · JPL
31410	1999 AY_{5}	—	January 12, 1999	Oizumi	T. Kobayashi	·	3.4 km	MPC · JPL
31411	1999 AU_{9}	—	January 10, 1999	Xinglong	SCAP	·	2.2 km	MPC · JPL
31412 Andersonribeiro	1999 AP_{20}	Andersonribeiro	January 13, 1999	Anderson Mesa	LONEOS	·	2.6 km	MPC · JPL
31413	1999 AR_{21}	—	January 15, 1999	Višnjan Observatory	K. Korlević	·	2.6 km	MPC · JPL
31414 Rotarysusa	1999 AV_{22}	Rotarysusa	January 14, 1999	San Marcello	L. Tesi, A. Boattini	·	2.8 km	MPC · JPL
31415 Fenucci	1999 AK_{23}	Fenucci	January 10, 1999	Anderson Mesa	LONEOS	·	2.0 km	MPC · JPL
31416 Peteworden	1999 AX_{24}	Peteworden	January 15, 1999	Caussols	ODAS	NYS	2.3 km	MPC · JPL
31417	1999 AD_{32}	—	January 15, 1999	Kitt Peak	Spacewatch	V	3.5 km	MPC · JPL
31418 Sosaoyarzabal	1999 AJ_{34}	Sosaoyarzabal	January 14, 1999	Anderson Mesa	LONEOS	·	2.3 km	MPC · JPL
31419 Shafransky	1999 AN_{37}	Shafransky	January 6, 1999	Anderson Mesa	LONEOS	·	1.6 km	MPC · JPL
31420	1999 BV	—	January 16, 1999	Fair Oaks Ranch	J. V. McClusky	·	2.2 km	MPC · JPL
31421	1999 BZ	—	January 17, 1999	Catalina	CSS	HNS	5.0 km	MPC · JPL
31422	1999 BE_{1}	—	January 16, 1999	High Point	D. K. Chesney	·	2.1 km	MPC · JPL
31423	1999 BR_{2}	—	January 18, 1999	Oizumi	T. Kobayashi	V	2.0 km	MPC · JPL
31424	1999 BW_{2}	—	January 18, 1999	Oizumi	T. Kobayashi	·	3.1 km	MPC · JPL
31425	1999 BF_{3}	—	January 16, 1999	Kushiro	S. Ueda, H. Kaneda	·	5.1 km	MPC · JPL
31426 Davidlouapre	1999 BA_{5}	Davidlouapre	January 19, 1999	Caussols	ODAS	·	3.8 km	MPC · JPL
31427	1999 BS_{5}	—	January 20, 1999	Višnjan Observatory	K. Korlević	·	3.2 km	MPC · JPL
31428	1999 BG_{6}	—	January 20, 1999	Caussols	ODAS	·	3.4 km	MPC · JPL
31429 Diegoazzaro	1999 BL_{7}	Diegoazzaro	January 21, 1999	Colleverde	V. S. Casulli	V	2.5 km	MPC · JPL
31430	1999 BX_{8}	—	January 22, 1999	Višnjan Observatory	K. Korlević	NYS	3.1 km	MPC · JPL
31431 Cabibbo	1999 BP_{9}	Cabibbo	January 21, 1999	Bologna	San Vittore	·	5.7 km	MPC · JPL
31432	1999 BY_{12}	—	January 24, 1999	Višnjan Observatory	K. Korlević	·	14 km	MPC · JPL
31433	1999 BA_{13}	—	January 24, 1999	Višnjan Observatory	K. Korlević	NYS ·	4.6 km	MPC · JPL
31434	1999 BQ_{13}	—	January 25, 1999	Višnjan Observatory	K. Korlević	·	3.2 km	MPC · JPL
31435 Benhauck	1999 BH_{14}	Benhauck	January 23, 1999	Caussols	ODAS	·	2.8 km	MPC · JPL
31436	1999 BJ_{15}	—	January 26, 1999	Višnjan Observatory	K. Korlević	·	4.4 km	MPC · JPL
31437 Verma	1999 BT_{19}	Verma	January 16, 1999	Socorro	LINEAR	·	3.0 km	MPC · JPL
31438 Yasuhitohayashi	1999 BV_{19}	Yasuhitohayashi	January 16, 1999	Socorro	LINEAR	·	1.8 km	MPC · JPL
31439 Mieyamanaka	1999 BQ_{23}	Mieyamanaka	January 18, 1999	Socorro	LINEAR	·	2.7 km	MPC · JPL
31440	1999 BD_{26}	—	January 25, 1999	Višnjan Observatory	K. Korlević	·	2.6 km	MPC · JPL
31441	1999 BE_{28}	—	January 17, 1999	Kitt Peak	Spacewatch	·	3.5 km	MPC · JPL
31442 Stark	1999 CY_{1}	Stark	February 7, 1999	Jornada	Dixon, D. S.	NYS	3.6 km	MPC · JPL
31443	1999 CL_{2}	—	February 5, 1999	Xinglong	SCAP	·	2.0 km	MPC · JPL
31444	1999 CW_{2}	—	February 9, 1999	Oaxaca	Roe, J. M.	·	1.7 km	MPC · JPL
31445	1999 CS_{5}	—	February 12, 1999	Oizumi	T. Kobayashi	·	4.6 km	MPC · JPL
31446	1999 CV_{5}	—	February 12, 1999	Oizumi	T. Kobayashi	MAR	5.4 km	MPC · JPL
31447	1999 CB_{8}	—	February 12, 1999	Višnjan Observatory	K. Korlević	·	2.9 km	MPC · JPL
31448	1999 CO_{8}	—	February 13, 1999	High Point	D. K. Chesney	·	2.5 km	MPC · JPL
31449	1999 CO_{9}	—	February 14, 1999	Oizumi	T. Kobayashi	V	2.8 km	MPC · JPL
31450 Stevepreston	1999 CU_{9}	Stevepreston	February 14, 1999	Reedy Creek	J. Broughton	moon	11 km	MPC · JPL
31451 Joenickell	1999 CE_{10}	Joenickell	February 9, 1999	Grasslands	McGaha, J.	·	1.9 km	MPC · JPL
31452	1999 CX_{12}	—	February 14, 1999	Caussols	ODAS	·	6.5 km	MPC · JPL
31453 Arnaudthiry	1999 CY_{12}	Arnaudthiry	February 14, 1999	Caussols	ODAS	·	4.1 km	MPC · JPL
31454	1999 CH_{14}	—	February 13, 1999	Višnjan Observatory	K. Korlević	·	3.7 km	MPC · JPL
31455	1999 CU_{14}	—	February 15, 1999	Višnjan Observatory	K. Korlević	·	7.9 km	MPC · JPL
31456	1999 CV_{14}	—	February 15, 1999	Višnjan Observatory	K. Korlević	·	5.7 km	MPC · JPL
31457	1999 CW_{14}	—	February 15, 1999	Višnjan Observatory	K. Korlević	NYS	2.1 km	MPC · JPL
31458 Delrosso	1999 CG_{16}	Delrosso	February 15, 1999	San Marcello	L. Tesi, A. Boattini	·	5.2 km	MPC · JPL
31459	1999 CB_{17}	—	February 10, 1999	Socorro	LINEAR	EUN	6.4 km	MPC · JPL
31460 Jongsowfei	1999 CV_{19}	Jongsowfei	February 10, 1999	Socorro	LINEAR	·	2.9 km	MPC · JPL
31461 Shannonlee	1999 CK_{20}	Shannonlee	February 10, 1999	Socorro	LINEAR	·	4.8 km	MPC · JPL
31462 Brchnelova	1999 CW_{22}	Brchnelova	February 10, 1999	Socorro	LINEAR	·	2.3 km	MPC · JPL
31463 Michalgeci	1999 CC_{24}	Michalgeci	February 10, 1999	Socorro	LINEAR	·	5.5 km	MPC · JPL
31464 Liscinsky	1999 CM_{25}	Liscinsky	February 10, 1999	Socorro	LINEAR	·	5.4 km	MPC · JPL
31465 Piyasiri	1999 CS_{26}	Piyasiri	February 10, 1999	Socorro	LINEAR	NYS ·	6.7 km	MPC · JPL
31466 Abualhassan	1999 CU_{26}	Abualhassan	February 10, 1999	Socorro	LINEAR	NYS	2.6 km	MPC · JPL
31467	1999 CG_{29}	—	February 10, 1999	Socorro	LINEAR	·	2.8 km	MPC · JPL
31468 Albastaki	1999 CE_{31}	Albastaki	February 10, 1999	Socorro	LINEAR	NYS	1.8 km	MPC · JPL
31469 Aizawa	1999 CO_{31}	Aizawa	February 10, 1999	Socorro	LINEAR	·	3.5 km	MPC · JPL
31470 Alagappan	1999 CR_{33}	Alagappan	February 10, 1999	Socorro	LINEAR	·	3.5 km	MPC · JPL
31471 Sallyalbright	1999 CJ_{36}	Sallyalbright	February 10, 1999	Socorro	LINEAR	·	3.1 km	MPC · JPL
31472	1999 CT_{36}	—	February 10, 1999	Socorro	LINEAR	·	3.2 km	MPC · JPL
31473 Guangning	1999 CD_{37}	Guangning	February 10, 1999	Socorro	LINEAR	·	3.6 km	MPC · JPL
31474 Advaithanand	1999 CL_{37}	Advaithanand	February 10, 1999	Socorro	LINEAR	·	2.5 km	MPC · JPL
31475 Robbacchus	1999 CH_{42}	Robbacchus	February 10, 1999	Socorro	LINEAR	·	3.1 km	MPC · JPL
31476 Bocconcelli	1999 CK_{43}	Bocconcelli	February 10, 1999	Socorro	LINEAR	NYS	3.9 km	MPC · JPL
31477 Meenakshi	1999 CO_{43}	Meenakshi	February 10, 1999	Socorro	LINEAR	·	2.8 km	MPC · JPL
31478	1999 CJ_{45}	—	February 10, 1999	Socorro	LINEAR	·	4.0 km	MPC · JPL
31479 Botello	1999 CD_{47}	Botello	February 10, 1999	Socorro	LINEAR	V	3.1 km	MPC · JPL
31480 Jonahbutler	1999 CN_{47}	Jonahbutler	February 10, 1999	Socorro	LINEAR	·	6.4 km	MPC · JPL
31481	1999 CX_{47}	—	February 10, 1999	Socorro	LINEAR	·	7.3 km	MPC · JPL
31482 Caddell	1999 CK_{48}	Caddell	February 10, 1999	Socorro	LINEAR	·	3.8 km	MPC · JPL
31483 Caulfield	1999 CR_{48}	Caulfield	February 10, 1999	Socorro	LINEAR	NYS	2.4 km	MPC · JPL
31484	1999 CC_{49}	—	February 10, 1999	Socorro	LINEAR	·	9.9 km	MPC · JPL
31485	1999 CM_{51}	—	February 10, 1999	Socorro	LINEAR	·	9.8 km	MPC · JPL
31486	1999 CR_{52}	—	February 10, 1999	Socorro	LINEAR	slow	4.7 km	MPC · JPL
31487 Parthchopra	1999 CH_{53}	Parthchopra	February 10, 1999	Socorro	LINEAR	·	6.2 km	MPC · JPL
31488	1999 CM_{53}	—	February 10, 1999	Socorro	LINEAR	·	6.6 km	MPC · JPL
31489 Matthewchun	1999 CN_{53}	Matthewchun	February 10, 1999	Socorro	LINEAR	V	2.2 km	MPC · JPL
31490 Swapnavdeka	1999 CB_{55}	Swapnavdeka	February 10, 1999	Socorro	LINEAR	·	4.7 km	MPC · JPL
31491 Demessie	1999 CF_{57}	Demessie	February 10, 1999	Socorro	LINEAR	·	2.9 km	MPC · JPL
31492 Jennarose	1999 CV_{57}	Jennarose	February 10, 1999	Socorro	LINEAR	·	2.5 km	MPC · JPL
31493 Fernando-Peiris	1999 CS_{58}	Fernando-Peiris	February 10, 1999	Socorro	LINEAR	·	3.7 km	MPC · JPL
31494 Emmafreedman	1999 CP_{60}	Emmafreedman	February 12, 1999	Socorro	LINEAR	·	3.8 km	MPC · JPL
31495 Sarahgalvin	1999 CR_{60}	Sarahgalvin	February 12, 1999	Socorro	LINEAR	·	5.3 km	MPC · JPL
31496 Glowacz	1999 CU_{60}	Glowacz	February 12, 1999	Socorro	LINEAR	·	3.4 km	MPC · JPL
31497	1999 CW_{61}	—	February 12, 1999	Socorro	LINEAR	EUN	4.4 km	MPC · JPL
31498	1999 CX_{61}	—	February 12, 1999	Socorro	LINEAR	·	13 km	MPC · JPL
31499	1999 CS_{64}	—	February 12, 1999	Socorro	LINEAR	·	15 km	MPC · JPL
31500 Grutzik	1999 CK_{66}	Grutzik	February 12, 1999	Socorro	LINEAR	·	2.7 km	MPC · JPL

== 31501–31600 ==
back to top

Designation			Discovery			Properties		Ref
Permanent	Provisional	Named after	Date	Site	Discoverer(s)	Category	Diam.	Ref
31501 Williamhang	1999 CJ_{68}	Williamhang	February 12, 1999	Socorro	LINEAR	·	2.1 km	MPC · JPL
31502 Hellerstein	1999 CQ_{68}	Hellerstein	February 12, 1999	Socorro	LINEAR	·	3.0 km	MPC · JPL
31503 Jessicahong	1999 CH_{72}	Jessicahong	February 12, 1999	Socorro	LINEAR	·	3.1 km	MPC · JPL
31504 Jaisonjain	1999 CF_{73}	Jaisonjain	February 12, 1999	Socorro	LINEAR	V	2.3 km	MPC · JPL
31505	1999 CE_{74}	—	February 12, 1999	Socorro	LINEAR	NYS ·	9.0 km	MPC · JPL
31506	1999 CZ_{76}	—	February 12, 1999	Socorro	LINEAR	·	5.1 km	MPC · JPL
31507 Williamjin	1999 CX_{81}	Williamjin	February 12, 1999	Socorro	LINEAR	(2076)	4.6 km	MPC · JPL
31508 Kanevsky	1999 CK_{84}	Kanevsky	February 10, 1999	Socorro	LINEAR	·	4.0 km	MPC · JPL
31509	1999 CT_{84}	—	February 10, 1999	Socorro	LINEAR	·	3.0 km	MPC · JPL
31510 Saumya	1999 CQ_{85}	Saumya	February 10, 1999	Socorro	LINEAR	·	4.1 km	MPC · JPL
31511 Jessicakim	1999 CL_{87}	Jessicakim	February 10, 1999	Socorro	LINEAR	·	3.5 km	MPC · JPL
31512 Koyyalagunta	1999 CF_{91}	Koyyalagunta	February 10, 1999	Socorro	LINEAR	·	4.1 km	MPC · JPL
31513 Lafazan	1999 CV_{92}	Lafazan	February 10, 1999	Socorro	LINEAR	·	2.8 km	MPC · JPL
31514	1999 CL_{101}	—	February 10, 1999	Socorro	LINEAR	·	4.1 km	MPC · JPL
31515	1999 CN_{101}	—	February 10, 1999	Socorro	LINEAR	·	5.1 km	MPC · JPL
31516 Leibowitz	1999 CX_{101}	Leibowitz	February 10, 1999	Socorro	LINEAR	·	4.7 km	MPC · JPL
31517 Mahoui	1999 CW_{102}	Mahoui	February 12, 1999	Socorro	LINEAR	·	3.3 km	MPC · JPL
31518	1999 CG_{103}	—	February 12, 1999	Socorro	LINEAR	EUN	4.7 km	MPC · JPL
31519 Mimamarquez	1999 CS_{103}	Mimamarquez	February 12, 1999	Socorro	LINEAR	V	2.1 km	MPC · JPL
31520	1999 CB_{105}	—	February 12, 1999	Socorro	LINEAR	·	3.2 km	MPC · JPL
31521	1999 CT_{106}	—	February 12, 1999	Socorro	LINEAR	EUN	4.7 km	MPC · JPL
31522 McCutchen	1999 CE_{109}	McCutchen	February 12, 1999	Socorro	LINEAR	·	2.0 km	MPC · JPL
31523 Jessemichel	1999 CZ_{110}	Jessemichel	February 12, 1999	Socorro	LINEAR	(5)	3.5 km	MPC · JPL
31524	1999 CE_{112}	—	February 12, 1999	Socorro	LINEAR	·	4.7 km	MPC · JPL
31525 Nickmiller	1999 CO_{116}	Nickmiller	February 12, 1999	Socorro	LINEAR	·	4.3 km	MPC · JPL
31526	1999 CW_{124}	—	February 11, 1999	Socorro	LINEAR	·	7.3 km	MPC · JPL
31527	1999 CM_{126}	—	February 11, 1999	Socorro	LINEAR	·	4.4 km	MPC · JPL
31528	1999 CU_{126}	—	February 11, 1999	Socorro	LINEAR	PHO	3.3 km	MPC · JPL
31529	1999 CW_{127}	—	February 11, 1999	Socorro	LINEAR	HNS	5.3 km	MPC · JPL
31530	1999 CQ_{128}	—	February 11, 1999	Socorro	LINEAR	EUN	5.1 km	MPC · JPL
31531 ARRL	1999 CQ_{137}	ARRL	February 9, 1999	Kitt Peak	Spacewatch	·	5.3 km	MPC · JPL
31532	1999 CZ_{146}	—	February 9, 1999	Kitt Peak	Spacewatch	·	4.8 km	MPC · JPL
31533	1999 CV_{148}	—	February 10, 1999	Kitt Peak	Spacewatch	·	2.5 km	MPC · JPL
31534	1999 CE_{149}	—	February 13, 1999	Kitt Peak	Spacewatch	·	3.3 km	MPC · JPL
31535	1999 CE_{150}	—	February 13, 1999	Kitt Peak	Spacewatch	·	4.7 km	MPC · JPL
31536	1999 CX_{150}	—	February 8, 1999	Kitt Peak	Spacewatch	·	3.9 km	MPC · JPL
31537	1999 DZ	—	February 18, 1999	Višnjan Observatory	K. Korlević	·	2.4 km	MPC · JPL
31538	1999 DM_{1}	—	February 17, 1999	Socorro	LINEAR	·	2.3 km	MPC · JPL
31539	1999 DQ_{1}	—	February 18, 1999	Haleakala	NEAT	·	21 km	MPC · JPL
31540	1999 DK_{2}	—	February 19, 1999	Oizumi	T. Kobayashi	MAR	8.0 km	MPC · JPL
31541	1999 DC_{3}	—	February 21, 1999	Oizumi	T. Kobayashi	·	2.7 km	MPC · JPL
31542	1999 DR_{3}	—	February 20, 1999	Nachi-Katsuura	Y. Shimizu, T. Urata	EOS	12 km	MPC · JPL
31543	1999 DM_{5}	—	February 17, 1999	Socorro	LINEAR	·	4.4 km	MPC · JPL
31544	1999 DZ_{5}	—	February 17, 1999	Socorro	LINEAR	·	5.4 km	MPC · JPL
31545	1999 DN_{6}	—	February 20, 1999	Socorro	LINEAR	·	6.9 km	MPC · JPL
31546	1999 DP_{6}	—	February 20, 1999	Socorro	LINEAR	·	10 km	MPC · JPL
31547	1999 DT_{6}	—	February 20, 1999	Socorro	LINEAR	·	13 km	MPC · JPL
31548	1999 DV_{6}	—	February 20, 1999	Socorro	LINEAR	MAR	7.2 km	MPC · JPL
31549	1999 DY_{6}	—	February 23, 1999	Socorro	LINEAR	EUN	5.7 km	MPC · JPL
31550 Beckmaier	1999 DT_{7}	Beckmaier	February 18, 1999	Anderson Mesa	LONEOS	·	2.6 km	MPC · JPL
31551 Ashleyking	1999 DV_{7}	Ashleyking	February 18, 1999	Anderson Mesa	LONEOS	·	2.8 km	MPC · JPL
31552	1999 EJ	—	March 7, 1999	Reedy Creek	J. Broughton	·	4.7 km	MPC · JPL
31553	1999 EG_{2}	—	March 9, 1999	Kitt Peak	Spacewatch	·	2.8 km	MPC · JPL
31554	1999 EJ_{2}	—	March 9, 1999	Kitt Peak	Spacewatch	MAR	7.5 km	MPC · JPL
31555 Wheeler	1999 EV_{2}	Wheeler	March 7, 1999	Gnosca	S. Sposetti	·	2.7 km	MPC · JPL
31556 Shatner	1999 EP_{5}	Shatner	March 13, 1999	Goodricke-Pigott	R. A. Tucker	·	4.7 km	MPC · JPL
31557 Holleybakich	1999 EX_{5}	Holleybakich	March 13, 1999	Goodricke-Pigott	R. A. Tucker	GEF	3.3 km	MPC · JPL
31558	1999 EE_{6}	—	March 12, 1999	Kitt Peak	Spacewatch	·	2.7 km	MPC · JPL
31559 Alonmillet	1999 ED_{12}	Alonmillet	March 15, 1999	Socorro	LINEAR	·	2.2 km	MPC · JPL
31560	1999 EQ_{14}	—	March 11, 1999	Kitt Peak	Spacewatch	·	5.5 km	MPC · JPL
31561	1999 FT_{5}	—	March 21, 1999	Farra d'Isonzo	Farra d'Isonzo	·	3.1 km	MPC · JPL
31562	1999 FU_{6}	—	March 19, 1999	Caussols	ODAS	·	2.6 km	MPC · JPL
31563 Bourdelledemicas	1999 FW_{8}	Bourdelledemicas	March 19, 1999	Anderson Mesa	LONEOS	NYS ·	7.1 km	MPC · JPL
31564	1999 FF_{9}	—	March 20, 1999	Anderson Mesa	LONEOS	·	4.5 km	MPC · JPL
31565	1999 FO_{9}	—	March 22, 1999	Anderson Mesa	LONEOS	·	3.5 km	MPC · JPL
31566	1999 FF_{10}	—	March 22, 1999	Anderson Mesa	LONEOS	·	4.6 km	MPC · JPL
31567	1999 FG_{10}	—	March 22, 1999	Anderson Mesa	LONEOS	(5)	3.9 km	MPC · JPL
31568	1999 FQ_{14}	—	March 19, 1999	Kitt Peak	Spacewatch	·	2.5 km	MPC · JPL
31569 Adriansonka	1999 FL_{18}	Adriansonka	March 22, 1999	Anderson Mesa	LONEOS	V	4.1 km	MPC · JPL
31570 Conjat	1999 FG_{19}	Conjat	March 22, 1999	Anderson Mesa	LONEOS	·	7.4 km	MPC · JPL
31571	1999 FY_{20}	—	March 25, 1999	Kleť	Kleť	·	3.3 km	MPC · JPL
31572	1999 FM_{22}	—	March 19, 1999	Socorro	LINEAR	·	5.0 km	MPC · JPL
31573 Mohanty	1999 FS_{23}	Mohanty	March 19, 1999	Socorro	LINEAR	·	2.8 km	MPC · JPL
31574 Moshova	1999 FB_{25}	Moshova	March 19, 1999	Socorro	LINEAR	·	2.3 km	MPC · JPL
31575 Nikhilmurthy	1999 FA_{26}	Nikhilmurthy	March 19, 1999	Socorro	LINEAR	·	2.3 km	MPC · JPL
31576 Nandigala	1999 FF_{26}	Nandigala	March 19, 1999	Socorro	LINEAR	·	3.4 km	MPC · JPL
31577	1999 FO_{27}	—	March 19, 1999	Socorro	LINEAR	·	5.4 km	MPC · JPL
31578	1999 FM_{29}	—	March 19, 1999	Socorro	LINEAR	AGN	4.0 km	MPC · JPL
31579	1999 FX_{29}	—	March 19, 1999	Socorro	LINEAR	HYG	8.0 km	MPC · JPL
31580 Bridgetoei	1999 FH_{30}	Bridgetoei	March 19, 1999	Socorro	LINEAR	fast	3.0 km	MPC · JPL
31581 Onnink	1999 FL_{30}	Onnink	March 19, 1999	Socorro	LINEAR	(2076)	4.6 km	MPC · JPL
31582 Miraeparker	1999 FO_{30}	Miraeparker	March 19, 1999	Socorro	LINEAR	·	3.5 km	MPC · JPL
31583	1999 FP_{30}	—	March 19, 1999	Socorro	LINEAR	HYG	11 km	MPC · JPL
31584 Emaparker	1999 FG_{31}	Emaparker	March 19, 1999	Socorro	LINEAR	V	2.9 km	MPC · JPL
31585	1999 FJ_{31}	—	March 19, 1999	Socorro	LINEAR	ADE	9.0 km	MPC · JPL
31586	1999 FA_{32}	—	March 19, 1999	Socorro	LINEAR	·	6.9 km	MPC · JPL
31587	1999 FQ_{32}	—	March 23, 1999	Višnjan Observatory	K. Korlević	NYS	2.8 km	MPC · JPL
31588 Harrypaul	1999 FT_{33}	Harrypaul	March 19, 1999	Socorro	LINEAR	HOF	5.7 km	MPC · JPL
31589	1999 FX_{33}	—	March 19, 1999	Socorro	LINEAR	·	9.0 km	MPC · JPL
31590	1999 FS_{34}	—	March 19, 1999	Socorro	LINEAR	·	7.4 km	MPC · JPL
31591	1999 FD_{35}	—	March 19, 1999	Socorro	LINEAR	THM	7.6 km	MPC · JPL
31592 Jacobplaut	1999 FG_{36}	Jacobplaut	March 20, 1999	Socorro	LINEAR	slow	3.5 km	MPC · JPL
31593 Romapradhan	1999 FG_{39}	Romapradhan	March 20, 1999	Socorro	LINEAR	·	2.3 km	MPC · JPL
31594 Drewprevost	1999 FH_{41}	Drewprevost	March 20, 1999	Socorro	LINEAR	·	5.0 km	MPC · JPL
31595 Noahpritt	1999 FS_{45}	Noahpritt	March 20, 1999	Socorro	LINEAR	·	2.8 km	MPC · JPL
31596 Ragavender	1999 FL_{46}	Ragavender	March 20, 1999	Socorro	LINEAR	MAS	2.3 km	MPC · JPL
31597 Allisonmarie	1999 FP_{47}	Allisonmarie	March 20, 1999	Socorro	LINEAR	V	2.3 km	MPC · JPL
31598 Danielrudin	1999 FQ_{48}	Danielrudin	March 20, 1999	Socorro	LINEAR	·	4.8 km	MPC · JPL
31599 Chloesherry	1999 FE_{49}	Chloesherry	March 20, 1999	Socorro	LINEAR	·	4.1 km	MPC · JPL
31600 Somasundaram	1999 FJ_{51}	Somasundaram	March 20, 1999	Socorro	LINEAR	·	5.2 km	MPC · JPL

== 31601–31700 ==
back to top

Designation			Discovery			Properties		Ref
Permanent	Provisional	Named after	Date	Site	Discoverer(s)	Category	Diam.	Ref
31601	1999 GF	—	April 3, 1999	Višnjan Observatory	K. Korlević	MAR	5.8 km	MPC · JPL
31602	1999 GG	—	April 3, 1999	Višnjan Observatory	K. Korlević	THM	8.1 km	MPC · JPL
31603	1999 GQ_{3}	—	April 10, 1999	Fountain Hills	C. W. Juels	·	5.5 km	MPC · JPL
31604	1999 GH_{4}	—	April 13, 1999	Oaxaca	Roe, J. M.	V	3.5 km	MPC · JPL
31605 Braschi	1999 GM_{4}	Braschi	April 10, 1999	Montelupo	M. Tombelli, A. Boattini	·	8.8 km	MPC · JPL
31606	1999 GX_{4}	—	April 13, 1999	Woomera	F. B. Zoltowski	·	2.7 km	MPC · JPL
31607	1999 GQ_{5}	—	April 15, 1999	Gekko	T. Kagawa	·	6.1 km	MPC · JPL
31608	1999 GR_{5}	—	April 12, 1999	Reedy Creek	J. Broughton	EOS	5.8 km	MPC · JPL
31609	1999 GT_{5}	—	April 15, 1999	Fountain Hills	C. W. Juels	THM	9.7 km	MPC · JPL
31610	1999 GC_{6}	—	April 14, 1999	Nachi-Katsuura	Y. Shimizu, T. Urata	MAR	7.3 km	MPC · JPL
31611	1999 GF_{6}	—	April 13, 1999	Višnjan Observatory	K. Korlević	V	2.9 km	MPC · JPL
31612	1999 GG_{6}	—	April 13, 1999	Višnjan Observatory	K. Korlević	GEF	3.7 km	MPC · JPL
31613 Adamgreenberg	1999 GO_{8}	Adamgreenberg	April 10, 1999	Anderson Mesa	LONEOS	·	3.1 km	MPC · JPL
31614	1999 GV_{10}	—	April 11, 1999	Kitt Peak	Spacewatch	THM	9.6 km	MPC · JPL
31615	1999 GF_{16}	—	April 9, 1999	Socorro	LINEAR	·	7.5 km	MPC · JPL
31616	1999 GM_{17}	—	April 15, 1999	Socorro	LINEAR	EOS	8.9 km	MPC · JPL
31617 Meeraradha	1999 GP_{17}	Meeraradha	April 15, 1999	Socorro	LINEAR	·	3.2 km	MPC · JPL
31618 Tharakan	1999 GE_{18}	Tharakan	April 15, 1999	Socorro	LINEAR	·	2.2 km	MPC · JPL
31619 Jodietinker	1999 GU_{18}	Jodietinker	April 15, 1999	Socorro	LINEAR	·	2.6 km	MPC · JPL
31620	1999 GB_{19}	—	April 15, 1999	Socorro	LINEAR	PHO · slow	6.1 km	MPC · JPL
31621	1999 GH_{19}	—	April 15, 1999	Socorro	LINEAR	·	5.8 km	MPC · JPL
31622	1999 GL_{19}	—	April 15, 1999	Socorro	LINEAR	V	3.8 km	MPC · JPL
31623	1999 GK_{20}	—	April 15, 1999	Socorro	LINEAR	·	8.4 km	MPC · JPL
31624	1999 GP_{20}	—	April 15, 1999	Socorro	LINEAR	·	7.8 km	MPC · JPL
31625	1999 GR_{20}	—	April 15, 1999	Socorro	LINEAR	·	5.6 km	MPC · JPL
31626	1999 GV_{20}	—	April 15, 1999	Socorro	LINEAR	·	8.9 km	MPC · JPL
31627 Ulmera	1999 GW_{20}	Ulmera	April 15, 1999	Socorro	LINEAR	V	2.8 km	MPC · JPL
31628 Vorperian	1999 GG_{23}	Vorperian	April 6, 1999	Socorro	LINEAR	·	3.1 km	MPC · JPL
31629	1999 GK_{23}	—	April 6, 1999	Socorro	LINEAR	·	2.1 km	MPC · JPL
31630 Jennywang	1999 GN_{23}	Jennywang	April 6, 1999	Socorro	LINEAR	·	4.5 km	MPC · JPL
31631 Abbywilliams	1999 GL_{28}	Abbywilliams	April 7, 1999	Socorro	LINEAR	·	4.8 km	MPC · JPL
31632 Stephaying	1999 GM_{28}	Stephaying	April 7, 1999	Socorro	LINEAR	·	5.2 km	MPC · JPL
31633 Almonte	1999 GH_{30}	Almonte	April 7, 1999	Socorro	LINEAR	THM	5.9 km	MPC · JPL
31634	1999 GG_{31}	—	April 7, 1999	Socorro	LINEAR	·	6.3 km	MPC · JPL
31635 Anandarao	1999 GW_{31}	Anandarao	April 7, 1999	Socorro	LINEAR	·	4.2 km	MPC · JPL
31636	1999 GB_{32}	—	April 7, 1999	Socorro	LINEAR	·	9.4 km	MPC · JPL
31637 Bhimaraju	1999 GF_{32}	Bhimaraju	April 7, 1999	Socorro	LINEAR	·	2.3 km	MPC · JPL
31638	1999 GL_{32}	—	April 7, 1999	Socorro	LINEAR	·	5.5 km	MPC · JPL
31639 Bodoni	1999 GC_{34}	Bodoni	April 6, 1999	Socorro	LINEAR	·	3.2 km	MPC · JPL
31640 Johncaven	1999 GH_{34}	Johncaven	April 6, 1999	Socorro	LINEAR	·	3.5 km	MPC · JPL
31641 Cevasco	1999 GW_{34}	Cevasco	April 6, 1999	Socorro	LINEAR	NYS	2.7 km	MPC · JPL
31642 Soyounchoi	1999 GX_{36}	Soyounchoi	April 14, 1999	Socorro	LINEAR	MIS	6.2 km	MPC · JPL
31643 Natashachugh	1999 GE_{41}	Natashachugh	April 12, 1999	Socorro	LINEAR	·	2.8 km	MPC · JPL
31644	1999 GY_{41}	—	April 12, 1999	Socorro	LINEAR	·	3.2 km	MPC · JPL
31645	1999 GJ_{42}	—	April 12, 1999	Socorro	LINEAR	·	8.8 km	MPC · JPL
31646	1999 GQ_{44}	—	April 12, 1999	Socorro	LINEAR	EOS	8.4 km	MPC · JPL
31647 Beauwigman	1999 GY_{51}	Beauwigman	April 11, 1999	Anderson Mesa	LONEOS	·	2.7 km	MPC · JPL
31648 Pedrosada	1999 GL_{53}	Pedrosada	April 11, 1999	Anderson Mesa	LONEOS	EUN	4.4 km	MPC · JPL
31649	1999 GL_{55}	—	April 7, 1999	Kitt Peak	Spacewatch	KOR	6.0 km	MPC · JPL
31650 Frýdek-Místek	1999 HW	Frýdek-Místek	April 18, 1999	Ondřejov	P. Pravec	·	7.2 km	MPC · JPL
31651 Edurnepasaban	1999 HH_{2}	Edurnepasaban	April 19, 1999	Majorca	Á. López J., R. Pacheco	·	3.6 km	MPC · JPL
31652	1999 HS_{2}	—	April 21, 1999	Xinglong	SCAP	NYS	3.2 km	MPC · JPL
31653	1999 HH_{4}	—	April 16, 1999	Kitt Peak	Spacewatch	THM	5.7 km	MPC · JPL
31654	1999 HJ_{5}	—	April 17, 1999	Kitt Peak	Spacewatch	·	3.4 km	MPC · JPL
31655 Averyclowes	1999 HG_{7}	Averyclowes	April 17, 1999	Socorro	LINEAR	·	7.4 km	MPC · JPL
31656	1999 HL_{8}	—	April 16, 1999	Socorro	LINEAR	EOS	11 km	MPC · JPL
31657	1999 HN_{8}	—	April 16, 1999	Socorro	LINEAR	·	3.1 km	MPC · JPL
31658	1999 HU_{8}	—	April 17, 1999	Socorro	LINEAR	EOS	5.8 km	MPC · JPL
31659	1999 HT_{10}	—	April 17, 1999	Socorro	LINEAR	HYG	9.7 km	MPC · JPL
31660 Maximiliandu	1999 HY_{10}	Maximiliandu	April 17, 1999	Socorro	LINEAR	·	3.1 km	MPC · JPL
31661 Eggebraaten	1999 HJ_{11}	Eggebraaten	April 17, 1999	Socorro	LINEAR	·	3.0 km	MPC · JPL
31662	1999 HP_{11}	—	April 19, 1999	Kitt Peak	Spacewatch	APO	440 m	MPC · JPL
31663 Anjani	1999 JG_{2}	Anjani	May 8, 1999	Catalina	CSS	V	2.2 km	MPC · JPL
31664 Randiiwessen	1999 JR_{2}	Randiiwessen	May 8, 1999	Farpoint	G. Hug	MAR	5.5 km	MPC · JPL
31665 Veblen	1999 JZ_{2}	Veblen	May 10, 1999	Prescott	P. G. Comba	·	6.3 km	MPC · JPL
31666	1999 JK_{3}	—	May 8, 1999	Oizumi	T. Kobayashi	EUN	5.9 km	MPC · JPL
31667	1999 JL_{3}	—	May 8, 1999	Oizumi	T. Kobayashi	PHO	3.3 km	MPC · JPL
31668	1999 JX_{3}	—	May 6, 1999	Woomera	F. B. Zoltowski	EOS	8.8 km	MPC · JPL
31669	1999 JT_{6}	—	May 12, 1999	Socorro	LINEAR	APO +1km · PHA	2.1 km	MPC · JPL
31670	1999 JL_{7}	—	May 8, 1999	Catalina	CSS	·	4.9 km	MPC · JPL
31671 Masatoshi	1999 JY_{7}	Masatoshi	May 13, 1999	Kuma Kogen	A. Nakamura	·	6.3 km	MPC · JPL
31672	1999 JB_{8}	—	May 12, 1999	Socorro	LINEAR	PHO · slow	3.8 km	MPC · JPL
31673 Nayessda	1999 JZ_{8}	Nayessda	May 7, 1999	Catalina	CSS	·	8.7 km	MPC · JPL
31674 Westermann	1999 JD_{9}	Westermann	May 7, 1999	Catalina	CSS	·	5.5 km	MPC · JPL
31675	1999 JO_{10}	—	May 8, 1999	Catalina	CSS	·	8.5 km	MPC · JPL
31676	1999 JN_{16}	—	May 15, 1999	Kitt Peak	Spacewatch	AGN ·	3.5 km	MPC · JPL
31677 Audreyglende	1999 JQ_{18}	Audreyglende	May 10, 1999	Socorro	LINEAR	·	3.7 km	MPC · JPL
31678	1999 JX_{18}	—	May 10, 1999	Socorro	LINEAR	V	3.0 km	MPC · JPL
31679 Glenngrimmett	1999 JJ_{19}	Glenngrimmett	May 10, 1999	Socorro	LINEAR	·	3.2 km	MPC · JPL
31680 Josephuitt	1999 JK_{19}	Josephuitt	May 10, 1999	Socorro	LINEAR	·	3.2 km	MPC · JPL
31681	1999 JH_{21}	—	May 10, 1999	Socorro	LINEAR	·	6.2 km	MPC · JPL
31682 Kinsey	1999 JU_{21}	Kinsey	May 10, 1999	Socorro	LINEAR	·	3.7 km	MPC · JPL
31683	1999 JJ_{22}	—	May 10, 1999	Socorro	LINEAR	·	6.8 km	MPC · JPL
31684 Lindsay	1999 JS_{22}	Lindsay	May 10, 1999	Socorro	LINEAR	·	7.8 km	MPC · JPL
31685	1999 JB_{25}	—	May 10, 1999	Socorro	LINEAR	EUN	8.4 km	MPC · JPL
31686	1999 JL_{26}	—	May 10, 1999	Socorro	LINEAR	·	5.2 km	MPC · JPL
31687	1999 JP_{26}	—	May 10, 1999	Socorro	LINEAR	KOR	4.9 km	MPC · JPL
31688 Bryantliu	1999 JT_{27}	Bryantliu	May 10, 1999	Socorro	LINEAR	·	6.6 km	MPC · JPL
31689 Sebmellen	1999 JW_{27}	Sebmellen	May 10, 1999	Socorro	LINEAR	THM	7.3 km	MPC · JPL
31690 Nayamenezes	1999 JK_{28}	Nayamenezes	May 10, 1999	Socorro	LINEAR	THM	7.0 km	MPC · JPL
31691	1999 JO_{30}	—	May 10, 1999	Socorro	LINEAR	EOS	5.3 km	MPC · JPL
31692	1999 JQ_{31}	—	May 10, 1999	Socorro	LINEAR	·	3.7 km	MPC · JPL
31693	1999 JC_{32}	—	May 10, 1999	Socorro	LINEAR	EUN	4.9 km	MPC · JPL
31694	1999 JO_{32}	—	May 10, 1999	Socorro	LINEAR	·	9.1 km	MPC · JPL
31695	1999 JQ_{32}	—	May 10, 1999	Socorro	LINEAR	·	9.8 km	MPC · JPL
31696 Rohitmital	1999 JF_{33}	Rohitmital	May 10, 1999	Socorro	LINEAR	·	6.5 km	MPC · JPL
31697 Isaiahoneal	1999 JG_{33}	Isaiahoneal	May 10, 1999	Socorro	LINEAR	AGN	3.8 km	MPC · JPL
31698 Nikolaiortiz	1999 JL_{33}	Nikolaiortiz	May 10, 1999	Socorro	LINEAR	KOR	4.1 km	MPC · JPL
31699	1999 JA_{36}	—	May 10, 1999	Socorro	LINEAR	·	11 km	MPC · JPL
31700 Naperez	1999 JB_{40}	Naperez	May 10, 1999	Socorro	LINEAR	THM	7.0 km	MPC · JPL

== 31701–31800 ==
back to top

Designation			Discovery			Properties		Ref
Permanent	Provisional	Named after	Date	Site	Discoverer(s)	Category	Diam.	Ref
31701 Ragula	1999 JC_{40}	Ragula	May 10, 1999	Socorro	LINEAR	AGN	3.4 km	MPC · JPL
31702	1999 JD_{41}	—	May 10, 1999	Socorro	LINEAR	·	6.8 km	MPC · JPL
31703	1999 JZ_{43}	—	May 10, 1999	Socorro	LINEAR	EOS	9.3 km	MPC · JPL
31704	1999 JZ_{44}	—	May 10, 1999	Socorro	LINEAR	TIR	4.7 km	MPC · JPL
31705	1999 JM_{45}	—	May 10, 1999	Socorro	LINEAR	·	11 km	MPC · JPL
31706 Singhani	1999 JX_{45}	Singhani	May 10, 1999	Socorro	LINEAR	·	5.1 km	MPC · JPL
31707	1999 JH_{49}	—	May 10, 1999	Socorro	LINEAR	HYG	8.0 km	MPC · JPL
31708	1999 JL_{49}	—	May 10, 1999	Socorro	LINEAR	·	5.4 km	MPC · JPL
31709	1999 JD_{51}	—	May 10, 1999	Socorro	LINEAR	·	6.2 km	MPC · JPL
31710	1999 JC_{52}	—	May 10, 1999	Socorro	LINEAR	·	9.3 km	MPC · JPL
31711 Suresh	1999 JY_{52}	Suresh	May 10, 1999	Socorro	LINEAR	·	3.6 km	MPC · JPL
31712	1999 JZ_{52}	—	May 10, 1999	Socorro	LINEAR	HYG	8.4 km	MPC · JPL
31713	1999 JF_{54}	—	May 10, 1999	Socorro	LINEAR	·	7.8 km	MPC · JPL
31714	1999 JP_{54}	—	May 10, 1999	Socorro	LINEAR	·	3.7 km	MPC · JPL
31715	1999 JX_{56}	—	May 10, 1999	Socorro	LINEAR	·	5.3 km	MPC · JPL
31716 Matoonder	1999 JJ_{57}	Matoonder	May 10, 1999	Socorro	LINEAR	·	5.9 km	MPC · JPL
31717	1999 JA_{58}	—	May 10, 1999	Socorro	LINEAR	EOS	9.1 km	MPC · JPL
31718	1999 JO_{58}	—	May 10, 1999	Socorro	LINEAR	·	7.9 km	MPC · JPL
31719 Davidyue	1999 JU_{58}	Davidyue	May 10, 1999	Socorro	LINEAR	·	5.9 km	MPC · JPL
31720	1999 JW_{59}	—	May 10, 1999	Socorro	LINEAR	·	6.4 km	MPC · JPL
31721	1999 JB_{60}	—	May 10, 1999	Socorro	LINEAR	·	6.9 km	MPC · JPL
31722	1999 JG_{61}	—	May 10, 1999	Socorro	LINEAR	·	8.2 km	MPC · JPL
31723	1999 JT_{61}	—	May 10, 1999	Socorro	LINEAR	·	11 km	MPC · JPL
31724	1999 JJ_{64}	—	May 10, 1999	Socorro	LINEAR	·	9.1 km	MPC · JPL
31725 Anushazaman	1999 JS_{66}	Anushazaman	May 12, 1999	Socorro	LINEAR	·	5.3 km	MPC · JPL
31726	1999 JA_{67}	—	May 12, 1999	Socorro	LINEAR	HYG	7.1 km	MPC · JPL
31727 Amandalewis	1999 JU_{67}	Amandalewis	May 12, 1999	Socorro	LINEAR	·	2.7 km	MPC · JPL
31728 Rhondah	1999 JZ_{68}	Rhondah	May 12, 1999	Socorro	LINEAR	MRX	2.8 km	MPC · JPL
31729 Scharmen	1999 JO_{69}	Scharmen	May 12, 1999	Socorro	LINEAR	·	8.3 km	MPC · JPL
31730	1999 JV_{70}	—	May 12, 1999	Socorro	LINEAR	slow	9.6 km	MPC · JPL
31731 Johnwiley	1999 JX_{70}	Johnwiley	May 12, 1999	Socorro	LINEAR	·	3.0 km	MPC · JPL
31732	1999 JB_{71}	—	May 12, 1999	Socorro	LINEAR	EUN	5.8 km	MPC · JPL
31733	1999 JP_{71}	—	May 12, 1999	Socorro	LINEAR	·	17 km	MPC · JPL
31734	1999 JT_{71}	—	May 12, 1999	Socorro	LINEAR	EOS	5.8 km	MPC · JPL
31735	1999 JJ_{72}	—	May 12, 1999	Socorro	LINEAR	·	9.0 km	MPC · JPL
31736	1999 JR_{73}	—	May 12, 1999	Socorro	LINEAR	EOS · moon	5.1 km	MPC · JPL
31737 Carriecoombs	1999 JT_{75}	Carriecoombs	May 10, 1999	Socorro	LINEAR	V	3.6 km	MPC · JPL
31738	1999 JC_{77}	—	May 12, 1999	Socorro	LINEAR	URS	8.9 km	MPC · JPL
31739	1999 JE_{77}	—	May 12, 1999	Socorro	LINEAR	EOS	4.4 km	MPC · JPL
31740	1999 JW_{77}	—	May 12, 1999	Socorro	LINEAR	EOS	5.6 km	MPC · JPL
31741	1999 JG_{78}	—	May 13, 1999	Socorro	LINEAR	·	5.2 km	MPC · JPL
31742	1999 JA_{79}	—	May 13, 1999	Socorro	LINEAR	·	5.6 km	MPC · JPL
31743	1999 JK_{79}	—	May 13, 1999	Socorro	LINEAR	VER	15 km	MPC · JPL
31744 Shimshock	1999 JN_{79}	Shimshock	May 13, 1999	Socorro	LINEAR	GEF	4.0 km	MPC · JPL
31745	1999 JN_{82}	—	May 12, 1999	Socorro	LINEAR	EOS	6.2 km	MPC · JPL
31746	1999 JP_{82}	—	May 12, 1999	Socorro	LINEAR	EOS	6.6 km	MPC · JPL
31747	1999 JD_{83}	—	May 12, 1999	Socorro	LINEAR	·	5.2 km	MPC · JPL
31748	1999 JG_{83}	—	May 12, 1999	Socorro	LINEAR	·	12 km	MPC · JPL
31749	1999 JV_{83}	—	May 12, 1999	Socorro	LINEAR	·	10 km	MPC · JPL
31750	1999 JQ_{84}	—	May 12, 1999	Socorro	LINEAR	·	6.8 km	MPC · JPL
31751	1999 JF_{85}	—	May 14, 1999	Socorro	LINEAR	·	15 km	MPC · JPL
31752	1999 JN_{91}	—	May 12, 1999	Socorro	LINEAR	EUN	3.5 km	MPC · JPL
31753	1999 JL_{94}	—	May 12, 1999	Socorro	LINEAR	URS	11 km	MPC · JPL
31754	1999 JT_{95}	—	May 12, 1999	Socorro	LINEAR	EOS	5.4 km	MPC · JPL
31755	1999 JA_{96}	—	May 12, 1999	Socorro	LINEAR	NAE	9.1 km	MPC · JPL
31756	1999 JL_{98}	—	May 12, 1999	Socorro	LINEAR	·	15 km	MPC · JPL
31757	1999 JO_{98}	—	May 12, 1999	Socorro	LINEAR	·	7.2 km	MPC · JPL
31758	1999 JQ_{99}	—	May 12, 1999	Socorro	LINEAR	·	8.4 km	MPC · JPL
31759	1999 JT_{99}	—	May 12, 1999	Socorro	LINEAR	·	6.2 km	MPC · JPL
31760	1999 JG_{101}	—	May 12, 1999	Socorro	LINEAR	EUN	4.2 km	MPC · JPL
31761	1999 JO_{103}	—	May 13, 1999	Socorro	LINEAR	DOR	10 km	MPC · JPL
31762	1999 JB_{104}	—	May 14, 1999	Socorro	LINEAR	slow	16 km	MPC · JPL
31763	1999 JW_{107}	—	May 13, 1999	Socorro	LINEAR	·	7.0 km	MPC · JPL
31764	1999 JB_{108}	—	May 13, 1999	Socorro	LINEAR	·	6.9 km	MPC · JPL
31765	1999 JG_{114}	—	May 13, 1999	Socorro	LINEAR	ADE	7.1 km	MPC · JPL
31766	1999 JD_{116}	—	May 13, 1999	Socorro	LINEAR	EOS	4.9 km	MPC · JPL
31767 Jennimartin	1999 JN_{116}	Jennimartin	May 13, 1999	Socorro	LINEAR	·	2.5 km	MPC · JPL
31768	1999 JA_{117}	—	May 13, 1999	Socorro	LINEAR	·	4.0 km	MPC · JPL
31769	1999 JL_{117}	—	May 13, 1999	Socorro	LINEAR	EOS	6.1 km	MPC · JPL
31770 Melivanhouten	1999 JK_{118}	Melivanhouten	May 13, 1999	Socorro	LINEAR	KOR	3.4 km	MPC · JPL
31771 Kirstenwright	1999 JX_{119}	Kirstenwright	May 13, 1999	Socorro	LINEAR	VER	6.7 km	MPC · JPL
31772 Asztalos	1999 JW_{120}	Asztalos	May 13, 1999	Socorro	LINEAR	·	5.4 km	MPC · JPL
31773	1999 JL_{121}	—	May 13, 1999	Socorro	LINEAR	·	10 km	MPC · JPL
31774 Debralas	1999 JW_{121}	Debralas	May 13, 1999	Socorro	LINEAR	·	5.4 km	MPC · JPL
31775	1999 JN_{122}	—	May 13, 1999	Socorro	LINEAR	·	4.6 km	MPC · JPL
31776	1999 JE_{124}	—	May 14, 1999	Socorro	LINEAR	·	5.7 km	MPC · JPL
31777 Amywinegar	1999 JO_{125}	Amywinegar	May 10, 1999	Socorro	LINEAR	KOR	5.6 km	MPC · JPL
31778 Richardschnur	1999 JT_{125}	Richardschnur	May 12, 1999	Socorro	LINEAR	V	3.0 km	MPC · JPL
31779	1999 JO_{129}	—	May 12, 1999	Socorro	LINEAR	·	9.0 km	MPC · JPL
31780 Thomaskelley	1999 JB_{136}	Thomaskelley	May 15, 1999	Anderson Mesa	LONEOS	EOS	6.9 km	MPC · JPL
31781	1999 KZ_{2}	—	May 17, 1999	Kitt Peak	Spacewatch	·	3.1 km	MPC · JPL
31782	1999 KM_{6}	—	May 21, 1999	Majorca	Á. López J., R. Pacheco	·	7.6 km	MPC · JPL
31783	1999 KV_{9}	—	May 18, 1999	Socorro	LINEAR	EOS	6.2 km	MPC · JPL
31784	1999 KB_{11}	—	May 18, 1999	Socorro	LINEAR	·	5.9 km	MPC · JPL
31785	1999 KK_{13}	—	May 18, 1999	Socorro	LINEAR	·	6.4 km	MPC · JPL
31786	1999 KO_{13}	—	May 18, 1999	Socorro	LINEAR	·	8.6 km	MPC · JPL
31787 Darcylawson	1999 KH_{14}	Darcylawson	May 18, 1999	Socorro	LINEAR	slow	6.5 km	MPC · JPL
31788	1999 KQ_{14}	—	May 18, 1999	Socorro	LINEAR	URS	14 km	MPC · JPL
31789	1999 KA_{15}	—	May 18, 1999	Socorro	LINEAR	·	6.2 km	MPC · JPL
31790	1999 LA_{1}	—	June 7, 1999	Socorro	LINEAR	EUN	7.8 km	MPC · JPL
31791	1999 LT_{3}	—	June 7, 1999	Socorro	LINEAR	EUP	11 km	MPC · JPL
31792	1999 LY_{4}	—	June 8, 1999	Socorro	LINEAR	TIR	4.1 km	MPC · JPL
31793	1999 LB_{6}	—	June 11, 1999	Socorro	LINEAR	H	3.2 km	MPC · JPL
31794	1999 LL_{9}	—	June 8, 1999	Socorro	LINEAR	·	10 km	MPC · JPL
31795	1999 LM_{14}	—	June 9, 1999	Socorro	LINEAR	V	3.2 km	MPC · JPL
31796	1999 LS_{15}	—	June 12, 1999	Socorro	LINEAR	(3025) ·	11 km	MPC · JPL
31797	1999 LN_{16}	—	June 9, 1999	Socorro	LINEAR	GEF · slow	4.6 km	MPC · JPL
31798	1999 LY_{16}	—	June 9, 1999	Socorro	LINEAR	·	8.0 km	MPC · JPL
31799	1999 LN_{23}	—	June 9, 1999	Socorro	LINEAR	EUN	5.4 km	MPC · JPL
31800	1999 LT_{25}	—	June 9, 1999	Socorro	LINEAR	·	8.1 km	MPC · JPL

== 31801–31900 ==
back to top

Designation			Discovery			Properties		Ref
Permanent	Provisional	Named after	Date	Site	Discoverer(s)	Category	Diam.	Ref
31801	1999 LY_{26}	—	June 9, 1999	Socorro	LINEAR	·	18 km	MPC · JPL
31802	1999 LP_{30}	—	June 12, 1999	Kitt Peak	Spacewatch	·	7.9 km	MPC · JPL
31803	1999 LN_{32}	—	June 6, 1999	Catalina	CSS	·	5.0 km	MPC · JPL
31804	1999 MG	—	June 18, 1999	Reedy Creek	J. Broughton	EUN	4.6 km	MPC · JPL
31805	1999 NN_{5}	—	July 13, 1999	Socorro	LINEAR	·	14 km	MPC · JPL
31806	1999 NE_{11}	—	July 13, 1999	Socorro	LINEAR	L5	24 km	MPC · JPL
31807 Shaunalennon	1999 NP_{17}	Shaunalennon	July 14, 1999	Socorro	LINEAR	·	3.4 km	MPC · JPL
31808	1999 NR_{34}	—	July 14, 1999	Socorro	LINEAR	·	11 km	MPC · JPL
31809	1999 NS_{36}	—	July 14, 1999	Socorro	LINEAR	URS	15 km	MPC · JPL
31810	1999 NR_{38}	—	July 14, 1999	Socorro	LINEAR	·	14 km	MPC · JPL
31811	1999 NA_{41}	—	July 14, 1999	Socorro	LINEAR	(31811)	14 km	MPC · JPL
31812	1999 NL_{47}	—	July 13, 1999	Socorro	LINEAR	·	9.5 km	MPC · JPL
31813	1999 RF_{41}	—	September 13, 1999	Socorro	LINEAR	H	1.6 km	MPC · JPL
31814	1999 RW_{70}	—	September 7, 1999	Socorro	LINEAR	L5	18 km	MPC · JPL
31815	1999 RY_{111}	—	September 9, 1999	Socorro	LINEAR	EUN	6.0 km	MPC · JPL
31816	1999 RZ_{117}	—	September 9, 1999	Socorro	LINEAR	EOS	8.0 km	MPC · JPL
31817	1999 RK_{134}	—	September 9, 1999	Socorro	LINEAR	3:2	22 km	MPC · JPL
31818	1999 RM_{135}	—	September 9, 1999	Socorro	LINEAR	·	20 km	MPC · JPL
31819	1999 RS_{150}	—	September 9, 1999	Socorro	LINEAR	L5	30 km	MPC · JPL
31820	1999 RT_{186}	—	September 9, 1999	Socorro	LINEAR	L5	17 km	MPC · JPL
31821	1999 RK_{225}	—	September 3, 1999	Kitt Peak	Spacewatch	L5	20 km	MPC · JPL
31822	1999 SY_{4}	—	September 29, 1999	Socorro	LINEAR	CYB	22 km	MPC · JPL
31823 Viète	1999 TN_{3}	Viète	October 4, 1999	Prescott	P. G. Comba	·	6.0 km	MPC · JPL
31824 Elatus	1999 UG_{5}	Elatus	October 29, 1999	Catalina	CSS	centaur	57 km	MPC · JPL
31825	1999 UL_{13}	—	October 29, 1999	Catalina	CSS	NYS	2.0 km	MPC · JPL
31826	1999 VM_{2}	—	November 5, 1999	Oizumi	T. Kobayashi	·	13 km	MPC · JPL
31827	1999 VJ_{13}	—	November 1, 1999	Socorro	LINEAR	H	2.7 km	MPC · JPL
31828 Martincordiner	1999 VU_{199}	Martincordiner	November 4, 1999	Anderson Mesa	LONEOS	·	15 km	MPC · JPL
31829	1999 XT_{12}	—	December 5, 1999	Socorro	LINEAR	EOS	8.0 km	MPC · JPL
31830	1999 XT_{59}	—	December 7, 1999	Socorro	LINEAR	EOS	8.0 km	MPC · JPL
31831	1999 YL	—	December 16, 1999	Socorro	LINEAR	H	2.2 km	MPC · JPL
31832	2000 AP_{59}	—	January 4, 2000	Socorro	LINEAR	·	2.5 km	MPC · JPL
31833	2000 AW_{123}	—	January 5, 2000	Socorro	LINEAR	EUN	4.1 km	MPC · JPL
31834	2000 AL_{142}	—	January 5, 2000	Socorro	LINEAR	·	3.7 km	MPC · JPL
31835	2000 BK_{16}	—	January 30, 2000	Socorro	LINEAR	L4	27 km	MPC · JPL
31836 Poshedly	2000 BU_{34}	Poshedly	January 30, 2000	Catalina	CSS	·	2.7 km	MPC · JPL
31837	2000 CB_{35}	—	February 2, 2000	Socorro	LINEAR	EUN	4.1 km	MPC · JPL
31838 Angelarob	2000 CV_{48}	Angelarob	February 2, 2000	Socorro	LINEAR	V	3.5 km	MPC · JPL
31839 Depinto	2000 CW_{50}	Depinto	February 2, 2000	Socorro	LINEAR	NYS	2.7 km	MPC · JPL
31840 Normnegus	2000 CG_{51}	Normnegus	February 2, 2000	Socorro	LINEAR	·	1.8 km	MPC · JPL
31841	2000 CQ_{70}	—	February 7, 2000	Socorro	LINEAR	V	3.6 km	MPC · JPL
31842	2000 CF_{77}	—	February 10, 2000	Višnjan Observatory	K. Korlević	NYS	3.7 km	MPC · JPL
31843	2000 CQ_{80}	—	February 8, 2000	Socorro	LINEAR	·	2.7 km	MPC · JPL
31844 Mattwill	2000 DQ_{15}	Mattwill	February 26, 2000	Catalina	CSS	·	2.2 km	MPC · JPL
31845	2000 DK_{17}	—	February 29, 2000	Socorro	LINEAR	·	2.5 km	MPC · JPL
31846 Elainegillum	2000 DQ_{47}	Elainegillum	February 29, 2000	Socorro	LINEAR	·	2.0 km	MPC · JPL
31847	2000 DQ_{96}	—	February 29, 2000	Socorro	LINEAR	·	9.3 km	MPC · JPL
31848 Mikemattei	2000 EM_{21}	Mikemattei	March 3, 2000	Catalina	CSS	PHO	6.7 km	MPC · JPL
31849	2000 EZ_{21}	—	March 5, 2000	Socorro	LINEAR	H	1.3 km	MPC · JPL
31850	2000 EB_{22}	—	March 5, 2000	Socorro	LINEAR	H	1.4 km	MPC · JPL
31851	2000 EK_{40}	—	March 8, 2000	Socorro	LINEAR	·	1.8 km	MPC · JPL
31852	2000 EO_{43}	—	March 8, 2000	Socorro	LINEAR	·	3.8 km	MPC · JPL
31853 Rahulmital	2000 EW_{47}	Rahulmital	March 9, 2000	Socorro	LINEAR	V	1.8 km	MPC · JPL
31854 Darshanashah	2000 EB_{48}	Darshanashah	March 9, 2000	Socorro	LINEAR	·	1.2 km	MPC · JPL
31855	2000 EA_{50}	—	March 6, 2000	Višnjan Observatory	K. Korlević	EUN	3.7 km	MPC · JPL
31856	2000 EP_{54}	—	March 10, 2000	Kitt Peak	Spacewatch	·	3.8 km	MPC · JPL
31857	2000 EG_{58}	—	March 8, 2000	Socorro	LINEAR	·	1.7 km	MPC · JPL
31858 Raykanipe	2000 EL_{59}	Raykanipe	March 9, 2000	Socorro	LINEAR	·	2.0 km	MPC · JPL
31859 Zemaitis	2000 EB_{66}	Zemaitis	March 10, 2000	Socorro	LINEAR	MAS	1.6 km	MPC · JPL
31860	2000 ES_{68}	—	March 10, 2000	Socorro	LINEAR	·	1.7 km	MPC · JPL
31861 Darleshimizu	2000 EX_{68}	Darleshimizu	March 10, 2000	Socorro	LINEAR	MAS	1.4 km	MPC · JPL
31862 Garfinkle	2000 EY_{70}	Garfinkle	March 11, 2000	Catalina	CSS	·	2.3 km	MPC · JPL
31863 Hazelcoffman	2000 EE_{84}	Hazelcoffman	March 5, 2000	Socorro	LINEAR	·	4.6 km	MPC · JPL
31864	2000 EC_{86}	—	March 8, 2000	Socorro	LINEAR	·	13 km	MPC · JPL
31865	2000 ED_{86}	—	March 8, 2000	Socorro	LINEAR	·	4.8 km	MPC · JPL
31866	2000 EA_{94}	—	March 9, 2000	Socorro	LINEAR	·	1.9 km	MPC · JPL
31867	2000 EG_{94}	—	March 9, 2000	Socorro	LINEAR	·	5.1 km	MPC · JPL
31868	2000 EO_{97}	—	March 10, 2000	Socorro	LINEAR	·	2.0 km	MPC · JPL
31869	2000 EF_{101}	—	March 8, 2000	Kitt Peak	Spacewatch	·	3.0 km	MPC · JPL
31870	2000 EG_{101}	—	March 8, 2000	Kitt Peak	Spacewatch	·	5.4 km	MPC · JPL
31871 Siqueiros	2000 EA_{105}	Siqueiros	March 11, 2000	Anderson Mesa	LONEOS	·	5.0 km	MPC · JPL
31872 Terkán	2000 EL_{106}	Terkán	March 13, 2000	Piszkéstető	K. Sárneczky, Szabo, G.	·	3.8 km	MPC · JPL
31873 Toliou	2000 EA_{130}	Toliou	March 11, 2000	Anderson Mesa	LONEOS	NYS ·	4.3 km	MPC · JPL
31874 Kosiarek	2000 EF_{135}	Kosiarek	March 11, 2000	Anderson Mesa	LONEOS	·	3.5 km	MPC · JPL
31875 Saksena	2000 EG_{136}	Saksena	March 11, 2000	Socorro	LINEAR	·	1.2 km	MPC · JPL
31876 Jenkens	2000 EA_{142}	Jenkens	March 2, 2000	Catalina	CSS	·	4.7 km	MPC · JPL
31877 Davideverett	2000 EX_{144}	Davideverett	March 3, 2000	Catalina	CSS	·	5.3 km	MPC · JPL
31878	2000 FR_{7}	—	March 29, 2000	Kvistaberg	Uppsala-DLR Asteroid Survey	PHO	4.5 km	MPC · JPL
31879	2000 FL_{12}	—	March 28, 2000	Socorro	LINEAR	·	7.0 km	MPC · JPL
31880	2000 FW_{12}	—	March 29, 2000	Socorro	LINEAR	·	4.1 km	MPC · JPL
31881	2000 FL_{15}	—	March 30, 2000	Socorro	LINEAR	·	1.4 km	MPC · JPL
31882	2000 FD_{20}	—	March 29, 2000	Socorro	LINEAR	·	3.2 km	MPC · JPL
31883 Susanstern	2000 FD_{22}	Susanstern	March 29, 2000	Socorro	LINEAR	·	3.5 km	MPC · JPL
31884 Evangelista	2000 FK_{27}	Evangelista	March 27, 2000	Anderson Mesa	LONEOS	·	3.5 km	MPC · JPL
31885 Greggweger	2000 FJ_{32}	Greggweger	March 29, 2000	Socorro	LINEAR	·	2.7 km	MPC · JPL
31886 Verlisak	2000 FN_{32}	Verlisak	March 29, 2000	Socorro	LINEAR	·	2.4 km	MPC · JPL
31887	2000 FM_{33}	—	March 29, 2000	Socorro	LINEAR	EUN	6.1 km	MPC · JPL
31888 Polizzi	2000 FM_{35}	Polizzi	March 29, 2000	Socorro	LINEAR	V	2.1 km	MPC · JPL
31889	2000 FW_{35}	—	March 29, 2000	Socorro	LINEAR	·	10 km	MPC · JPL
31890	2000 FG_{37}	—	March 29, 2000	Socorro	LINEAR	·	3.2 km	MPC · JPL
31891	2000 FR_{42}	—	March 28, 2000	Socorro	LINEAR	·	4.9 km	MPC · JPL
31892	2000 FC_{43}	—	March 28, 2000	Socorro	LINEAR	·	1.8 km	MPC · JPL
31893 Rodriguezalvarez	2000 FB_{44}	Rodriguezalvarez	March 29, 2000	Socorro	LINEAR	·	2.0 km	MPC · JPL
31894	2000 FD_{44}	—	March 29, 2000	Socorro	LINEAR	·	4.6 km	MPC · JPL
31895	2000 FX_{44}	—	March 29, 2000	Socorro	LINEAR	·	2.4 km	MPC · JPL
31896 Gaydarov	2000 FZ_{48}	Gaydarov	March 30, 2000	Socorro	LINEAR	·	3.8 km	MPC · JPL
31897 Brooksdasilva	2000 FT_{49}	Brooksdasilva	March 30, 2000	Socorro	LINEAR	V	3.0 km	MPC · JPL
31898	2000 GC_{1}	—	April 2, 2000	Socorro	LINEAR	H	1.8 km	MPC · JPL
31899 Adityamohan	2000 GG_{7}	Adityamohan	April 4, 2000	Socorro	LINEAR	·	1.5 km	MPC · JPL
31900	2000 GX_{15}	—	April 5, 2000	Socorro	LINEAR	·	3.3 km	MPC · JPL

== 31901–32000 ==
back to top

Designation			Discovery			Properties		Ref
Permanent	Provisional	Named after	Date	Site	Discoverer(s)	Category	Diam.	Ref
31901 Amitscheer	2000 GU_{18}	Amitscheer	April 12, 2000	Socorro	LINEAR	·	2.9 km	MPC · JPL
31902 Raymondwang	2000 GN_{19}	Raymondwang	April 5, 2000	Socorro	LINEAR	·	2.2 km	MPC · JPL
31903 Euniceyou	2000 GK_{26}	Euniceyou	April 5, 2000	Socorro	LINEAR	·	4.4 km	MPC · JPL
31904 Haoruochen	2000 GX_{34}	Haoruochen	April 5, 2000	Socorro	LINEAR	·	1.9 km	MPC · JPL
31905 Likinpong	2000 GM_{40}	Likinpong	April 5, 2000	Socorro	LINEAR	·	3.1 km	MPC · JPL
31906	2000 GF_{44}	—	April 5, 2000	Socorro	LINEAR	·	2.1 km	MPC · JPL
31907 Wongsumming	2000 GR_{44}	Wongsumming	April 5, 2000	Socorro	LINEAR	·	4.3 km	MPC · JPL
31908	2000 GP_{46}	—	April 5, 2000	Socorro	LINEAR	·	3.3 km	MPC · JPL
31909 Chenweitung	2000 GP_{52}	Chenweitung	April 5, 2000	Socorro	LINEAR	NYS	2.7 km	MPC · JPL
31910 Moustafa	2000 GJ_{53}	Moustafa	April 5, 2000	Socorro	LINEAR	·	2.0 km	MPC · JPL
31911 Luciafauth	2000 GE_{54}	Luciafauth	April 5, 2000	Socorro	LINEAR	NYS	2.2 km	MPC · JPL
31912 Lukasgrafner	2000 GM_{54}	Lukasgrafner	April 5, 2000	Socorro	LINEAR	·	2.3 km	MPC · JPL
31913	2000 GM_{56}	—	April 5, 2000	Socorro	LINEAR	·	3.8 km	MPC · JPL
31914	2000 GL_{65}	—	April 5, 2000	Socorro	LINEAR	·	1.9 km	MPC · JPL
31915	2000 GA_{66}	—	April 5, 2000	Socorro	LINEAR	·	5.9 km	MPC · JPL
31916 Arnehensel	2000 GC_{67}	Arnehensel	April 5, 2000	Socorro	LINEAR	·	1.4 km	MPC · JPL
31917 Lukashohne	2000 GH_{67}	Lukashohne	April 5, 2000	Socorro	LINEAR	·	3.1 km	MPC · JPL
31918 Onkargujral	2000 GW_{67}	Onkargujral	April 5, 2000	Socorro	LINEAR	·	4.2 km	MPC · JPL
31919 Carragher	2000 GC_{69}	Carragher	April 5, 2000	Socorro	LINEAR	·	2.3 km	MPC · JPL
31920 Annamcevoy	2000 GX_{69}	Annamcevoy	April 5, 2000	Socorro	LINEAR	V	1.6 km	MPC · JPL
31921	2000 GD_{71}	—	April 5, 2000	Socorro	LINEAR	·	3.8 km	MPC · JPL
31922 Alsharif	2000 GD_{72}	Alsharif	April 5, 2000	Socorro	LINEAR	·	2.6 km	MPC · JPL
31923	2000 GN_{73}	—	April 5, 2000	Socorro	LINEAR	·	5.0 km	MPC · JPL
31924	2000 GD_{74}	—	April 5, 2000	Socorro	LINEAR	NYS	3.2 km	MPC · JPL
31925 Krutovskiy	2000 GW_{75}	Krutovskiy	April 5, 2000	Socorro	LINEAR	·	2.8 km	MPC · JPL
31926 Alhamood	2000 GW_{76}	Alhamood	April 5, 2000	Socorro	LINEAR	MRX	4.0 km	MPC · JPL
31927	2000 GT_{78}	—	April 5, 2000	Socorro	LINEAR	·	1.4 km	MPC · JPL
31928 Limzhengtheng	2000 GU_{78}	Limzhengtheng	April 5, 2000	Socorro	LINEAR	·	2.2 km	MPC · JPL
31929	2000 GF_{79}	—	April 5, 2000	Socorro	LINEAR	·	2.7 km	MPC · JPL
31930	2000 GJ_{81}	—	April 6, 2000	Socorro	LINEAR	EUN	2.6 km	MPC · JPL
31931 Sipiera	2000 GW_{82}	Sipiera	April 10, 2000	Prescott	P. G. Comba	·	4.1 km	MPC · JPL
31932	2000 GK_{85}	—	April 3, 2000	Socorro	LINEAR	·	14 km	MPC · JPL
31933 Tanyizhao	2000 GY_{85}	Tanyizhao	April 4, 2000	Socorro	LINEAR	·	2.2 km	MPC · JPL
31934 Benjamintan	2000 GE_{88}	Benjamintan	April 4, 2000	Socorro	LINEAR	NYS	3.6 km	MPC · JPL
31935 Midgley	2000 GY_{88}	Midgley	April 4, 2000	Socorro	LINEAR	·	2.0 km	MPC · JPL
31936 Bernardsmit	2000 GP_{95}	Bernardsmit	April 6, 2000	Socorro	LINEAR	·	3.7 km	MPC · JPL
31937 Kangsunwoo	2000 GZ_{98}	Kangsunwoo	April 7, 2000	Socorro	LINEAR	·	2.5 km	MPC · JPL
31938 Nattapong	2000 GL_{99}	Nattapong	April 7, 2000	Socorro	LINEAR	·	2.3 km	MPC · JPL
31939 Thananon	2000 GC_{101}	Thananon	April 7, 2000	Socorro	LINEAR	·	3.2 km	MPC · JPL
31940 Sutthiluk	2000 GQ_{104}	Sutthiluk	April 7, 2000	Socorro	LINEAR	·	1.6 km	MPC · JPL
31941	2000 GQ_{105}	—	April 13, 2000	Socorro	LINEAR	PHO	4.2 km	MPC · JPL
31942	2000 GA_{106}	—	April 7, 2000	Socorro	LINEAR	·	3.3 km	MPC · JPL
31943 Tahsinelmas	2000 GJ_{106}	Tahsinelmas	April 7, 2000	Socorro	LINEAR	·	2.9 km	MPC · JPL
31944 Seyitherdem	2000 GP_{107}	Seyitherdem	April 7, 2000	Socorro	LINEAR	·	2.5 km	MPC · JPL
31945	2000 GQ_{108}	—	April 7, 2000	Socorro	LINEAR	·	3.3 km	MPC · JPL
31946 Sahilabbi	2000 GM_{109}	Sahilabbi	April 7, 2000	Socorro	LINEAR	·	1.9 km	MPC · JPL
31947	2000 GO_{109}	—	April 7, 2000	Socorro	LINEAR	·	3.8 km	MPC · JPL
31948 Marciarieke	2000 GH_{110}	Marciarieke	April 2, 2000	Anderson Mesa	LONEOS	·	1.8 km	MPC · JPL
31949	2000 GR_{120}	—	April 5, 2000	Kitt Peak	Spacewatch	·	2.5 km	MPC · JPL
31950	2000 GC_{122}	—	April 6, 2000	Kitt Peak	Spacewatch	·	3.2 km	MPC · JPL
31951 Alexisallen	2000 GL_{123}	Alexisallen	April 7, 2000	Socorro	LINEAR	·	2.5 km	MPC · JPL
31952 Bialtdecelie	2000 GS_{123}	Bialtdecelie	April 7, 2000	Socorro	LINEAR	·	2.3 km	MPC · JPL
31953 Bontha	2000 GZ_{125}	Bontha	April 7, 2000	Socorro	LINEAR	·	2.1 km	MPC · JPL
31954 Georgiebotev	2000 GJ_{126}	Georgiebotev	April 7, 2000	Socorro	LINEAR	V	2.7 km	MPC · JPL
31955	2000 GU_{126}	—	April 7, 2000	Socorro	LINEAR	·	4.2 km	MPC · JPL
31956 Wald	2000 GA_{133}	Wald	April 13, 2000	Prescott	P. G. Comba	·	3.4 km	MPC · JPL
31957 Braunstein	2000 GP_{133}	Braunstein	April 7, 2000	Socorro	LINEAR	·	1.7 km	MPC · JPL
31958	2000 GN_{135}	—	April 8, 2000	Socorro	LINEAR	·	3.8 km	MPC · JPL
31959 Keianacave	2000 GD_{136}	Keianacave	April 12, 2000	Socorro	LINEAR	·	4.2 km	MPC · JPL
31960 Fabioferrari	2000 GC_{142}	Fabioferrari	April 7, 2000	Anderson Mesa	LONEOS	·	3.8 km	MPC · JPL
31961 Andreaferrero	2000 GJ_{142}	Andreaferrero	April 7, 2000	Anderson Mesa	LONEOS	·	2.9 km	MPC · JPL
31962 Rayharvey	2000 GE_{153}	Rayharvey	April 6, 2000	Anderson Mesa	LONEOS	RAF	2.6 km	MPC · JPL
31963 Tanjamichalik	2000 GE_{154}	Tanjamichalik	April 6, 2000	Anderson Mesa	LONEOS	V	1.6 km	MPC · JPL
31964	2000 GG_{161}	—	April 7, 2000	Socorro	LINEAR	NYS	3.0 km	MPC · JPL
31965	2000 GQ_{161}	—	April 7, 2000	Socorro	LINEAR	·	3.0 km	MPC · JPL
31966	2000 HR_{1}	—	April 25, 2000	Kitt Peak	Spacewatch	V	1.3 km	MPC · JPL
31967	2000 HW_{4}	—	April 27, 2000	Socorro	LINEAR	·	11 km	MPC · JPL
31968	2000 HH_{5}	—	April 28, 2000	Socorro	LINEAR	H	1.3 km	MPC · JPL
31969 Yihuachen	2000 HL_{7}	Yihuachen	April 27, 2000	Socorro	LINEAR	·	2.6 km	MPC · JPL
31970	2000 HD_{9}	—	April 27, 2000	Socorro	LINEAR	·	3.7 km	MPC · JPL
31971 Beatricechoi	2000 HP_{9}	Beatricechoi	April 27, 2000	Socorro	LINEAR	NYS	4.1 km	MPC · JPL
31972 Carlycrump	2000 HX_{9}	Carlycrump	April 27, 2000	Socorro	LINEAR	V	1.3 km	MPC · JPL
31973 Ashwindatta	2000 HO_{10}	Ashwindatta	April 27, 2000	Socorro	LINEAR	V	2.1 km	MPC · JPL
31974	2000 HG_{12}	—	April 28, 2000	Socorro	LINEAR	·	1.7 km	MPC · JPL
31975 Johndean	2000 HA_{13}	Johndean	April 28, 2000	Socorro	LINEAR	·	3.0 km	MPC · JPL
31976 Niyatidesai	2000 HH_{13}	Niyatidesai	April 28, 2000	Socorro	LINEAR	·	4.9 km	MPC · JPL
31977 Devalapurkar	2000 HZ_{13}	Devalapurkar	April 28, 2000	Socorro	LINEAR	·	2.3 km	MPC · JPL
31978 Jeremyphilip	2000 HA_{14}	Jeremyphilip	April 28, 2000	Socorro	LINEAR	NYS	3.2 km	MPC · JPL
31979	2000 HH_{14}	—	April 28, 2000	Socorro	LINEAR	·	12 km	MPC · JPL
31980 Axelfeldmann	2000 HJ_{14}	Axelfeldmann	April 28, 2000	Socorro	LINEAR	·	3.1 km	MPC · JPL
31981	2000 HH_{15}	—	April 27, 2000	Socorro	LINEAR	NYS	4.1 km	MPC · JPL
31982 Johnwallis	2000 HS_{20}	Johnwallis	April 30, 2000	Prescott	P. G. Comba	·	4.8 km	MPC · JPL
31983	2000 HS_{21}	—	April 28, 2000	Socorro	LINEAR	·	3.6 km	MPC · JPL
31984 Unger	2000 HR_{23}	Unger	April 25, 2000	Starkenburg Observatory	Starkenburg	NYS	3.3 km	MPC · JPL
31985 Andrewryan	2000 HV_{23}	Andrewryan	April 24, 2000	Anderson Mesa	LONEOS	NYS ·	3.2 km	MPC · JPL
31986	2000 HZ_{27}	—	April 28, 2000	Socorro	LINEAR	H	1.1 km	MPC · JPL
31987	2000 HN_{28}	—	April 29, 2000	Socorro	LINEAR	NYS	2.8 km	MPC · JPL
31988 Jasonfiacco	2000 HT_{29}	Jasonfiacco	April 28, 2000	Socorro	LINEAR	·	1.9 km	MPC · JPL
31989	2000 HX_{33}	—	April 24, 2000	Anderson Mesa	LONEOS	·	1.3 km	MPC · JPL
31990	2000 HX_{34}	—	April 26, 2000	Višnjan Observatory	K. Korlević	·	3.1 km	MPC · JPL
31991 Royghosh	2000 HK_{35}	Royghosh	April 27, 2000	Socorro	LINEAR	·	2.5 km	MPC · JPL
31992	2000 HX_{35}	—	April 28, 2000	Socorro	LINEAR	·	3.2 km	MPC · JPL
31993	2000 HL_{37}	—	April 28, 2000	Socorro	LINEAR	EUN	5.0 km	MPC · JPL
31994	2000 HR_{40}	—	April 28, 2000	Socorro	LINEAR	·	2.6 km	MPC · JPL
31995	2000 HX_{40}	—	April 29, 2000	Socorro	LINEAR	·	2.5 km	MPC · JPL
31996 Goecknerwald	2000 HO_{42}	Goecknerwald	April 29, 2000	Socorro	LINEAR	V	1.3 km	MPC · JPL
31997	2000 HR_{43}	—	April 29, 2000	Kitt Peak	Spacewatch	·	2.6 km	MPC · JPL
31998 Maxlevine	2000 HN_{44}	Maxlevine	April 26, 2000	Anderson Mesa	LONEOS	·	1.7 km	MPC · JPL
31999	2000 HF_{47}	—	April 29, 2000	Socorro	LINEAR	EUN	3.5 km	MPC · JPL
32000	2000 HA_{51}	—	April 29, 2000	Socorro	LINEAR	·	3.2 km	MPC · JPL

back to top

== See also ==
- Meanings of minor-planet names: 31001–32000
