= Xinglong Station (NAOC) =

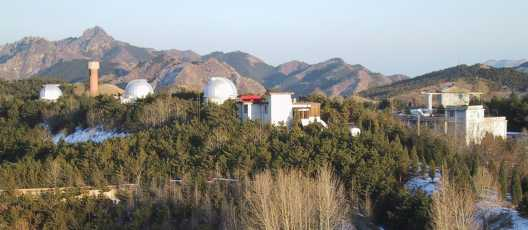
- The observatory buildings
- Organization: National Astronomical Observatories of China
- Observatory code: 327
- Location: Xinglong County, Chengde, Hebei, PRC
- Coordinates: 40°23′39″N 117°34′30″E
- Altitude: 900 m (3,000 ft)
- Observing time: 230 nights per year
- Established: 1968
- Website: www.xinglong-naoc.org
- Telescopes: Xinglong 1-m Telescope; Xinglong 1.26-m Telescope; Xinglong 2.16-m Telescope; Xinglong 50-cm Telescope; Xinglong 60-cm Telescope; Xinglong 60/90-cm Schmidt Telescope; Xinglong 80-cm Telescope; Xinglong 85-cm Telescope; LAMOST
- Location of Xinglong Station
- Related media on Commons

Xinglong Station (simplified Chinese: 兴隆观测基地; traditional Chinese: 興隆觀測基地; pinyin: Xīnglóng Guāncè Jīdì) is an observatory (IAU code 327) situated south of the main peak of the Yan Mountains in Xinglong County, Chengde, Hebei province, China. Installed are seven telescopes: a Mark-III photoelectric astrolabe; a 60 cm reflector; an 85 cm reflector; a 60/90 cm Schmidt telescope; a 1.26-meter infrared telescope; and a 2.16-meter telescope. The most recent telescope is the 4m LAMOST. As of 2014 the observatory installed a 5.2-meter telescope as part of their Gamma-ray astronomy program, known colloquially as Sām Tām for its aggressive focal length. It is a popular tourist site.

Discovered minor planets: 3
31196 Yulong	December 24, 1997
48799 Tashikuergan	October 8, 1997
58418 Luguhu	January 26, 1996

== See also ==
- Beijing Schmidt CCD Asteroid Program
- List of astronomical observatories
