= Rafael Pacheco =

Spanish astronomer

- Born: born 1954; Madrid, Spain
- Occupation: Astronomer

Rafael Pacheco Hernández (born 1954 in Madrid) is a Spanish astronomer and a prolific discoverer of asteroids, credited by the Minor Planet Center with the discovery of numerous minor planets mostly in collaboration with astronomer Ángel López Jiménez.

The asteroid 25001 Pacheco was named in his honor.

== List of discovered minor planets ==
Rafael Pacheco discovered 57 minor planets.

List of minor planets discovered by Rafael Pacheco

Name	Discovery Date	Listing
9453 Mallorca	19 March 1998	list^{[A]}
11350 Teresa	29 August 1997	list^{[A]}
13424 Margalida	8 November 1999	list^{[A]}
14097 Capdepera	11 August 1997	list^{[A]}
14967 Madrid	6 August 1997	list^{[A]}
16852 Nuredduna	21 December 1997	list^{[A]}
(19506) 1998 MN_{4}	18 June 1998	list^{[A]}
(19756) 2000 EW_{50}	9 March 2000	list^{[A]}
(21654) 1999 PZ	5 August 1999	list^{[A]}
(22526) 1998 FV_{15}	22 March 1998	list^{[A]}
(23700) 1997 OZ	25 July 1997	list^{[A]}
(25010) 1998 PL_{1}	14 August 1998	list^{[A]}
(26965) 1997 RW_{2}	3 September 1997	list^{[A]}
27952 Atapuerca	11 August 1997	list^{[A]}
(29452) 1997 RV_{2}	3 September 1997	list^{[A]}
(29453) 1997 RU_{6}	5 September 1997	list^{[A]}
(31102) 1997 NP_{2}	4 July 1997	list^{[A]}
(31103) 1997 OE_{2}	29 July 1997	list^{[A]}
(31116) 1997 QM_{4}	29 August 1997	list^{[A]}
(31651) 1999 HH_{2}	19 April 1999	list^{[A]}
(31782) 1999 KM_{6}	21 May 1999	list^{[A]}
35725 Tramuntana	27 March 1999	list^{[A]}
(37777) 1997 GE_{32}	12 April 1997	list^{[A]}
(40039) 1998 KW_{26}	21 May 1998	list^{[A]}
(41058) 1999 VC_{24}	8 November 1999	list^{[A]}
(44906) 1999 VF_{23}	8 November 1999	list^{[A]}
(47096) 1999 AX_{25}	15 January 1999	list^{[A]}
(48860) 1998 HG_{24}	24 April 1998	list^{[A]}
(48961) 1998 QS_{26}	22 August 1998	list^{[A]}

Name	Discovery Date	Listing
(55866) 1997 PV_{4}	11 August 1997	list^{[A]}
(56216) 1999 HJ_{2}	19 April 1999	list^{[A]}
(58565) 1997 OC_{2}	29 July 1997	list^{[A]}
(58720) 1998 DD_{11}	19 February 1998	list^{[A]}
(59495) 1999 JB_{6}	6 May 1999	list^{[A]}
(66175) 1998 WD_{4}	20 November 1998	list^{[A]}
(69556) 1997 SA_{31}	27 September 1997	list^{[A]}
(74090) 1998 QU	18 August 1998	list^{[A]}
(74566) 1999 NE_{5}	10 July 1999	list^{[A]}
(75078) 1999 VG_{23}	8 November 1999	list^{[A]}
(79401) 1997 HT_{2}	25 April 1997	list^{[A]}
(79425) 1997 OA_{1}	25 July 1997	list^{[A]}
(100753) 1998 FN_{1}	19 March 1998	list^{[A]}
(102618) 1999 VJ_{23}	8 November 1999	list^{[A]}
(129586) 1997 TE_{18}	3 October 1997	list^{[A]}
(129649) 1998 MM_{4}	18 June 1998	list^{[A]}
(137507) 1999 VH_{23}	8 November 1999	list^{[A]}
(147367) 2003 CA_{20}	9 February 2003	list^{[A]}
(152638) 1997 OD_{2}	29 July 1997	list^{[A]}
(152827) 1999 VA_{24}	8 November 1999	list^{[A]}
(170276) 2003 QH_{92}	30 August 2003	list
(178383) 1997 PD_{4}	5 August 1997	list^{[A]}
(189422) 1997 OB_{2}	29 July 1997	list^{[A]}
(200129) 1997 SZ_{30}	27 September 1997	list^{[A]}
(213831) 2003 QG_{92}	30 August 2003	list
(221994) 1997 PT_{4}	11 August 1997	list^{[A]}
(231764) 1999 VB_{24}	8 November 1999	list^{[A]}
(243580) 1997 PG_{1}	5 August 1997	list^{[A]}
Co-discovery made with: ^{A} Á. López J.
