= Ángel López Jiménez =

Spanish astronomer

Ángel López Jiménez (born 1955) is a Spanish astronomer. Working with Rafael Pacheco, he has discovered numerous asteroids. The Minor Planet Center may also refer to fellow astronomer Álvaro López-García when using "A. Lopez".

== List of discovered minor planets ==
Ángel López Jiménez discovered 58 minor planets.

List of minor planets discovered by Ángel López Jiménez

Name	Discovery Date	Listing
9453 Mallorca	19 March 1998	list^{[A]}
11350 Teresa	29 August 1997	list^{[A]}
13424 Margalida	8 November 1999	list^{[A]}
14097 Capdepera	11 August 1997	list^{[A]}
14967 Madrid	6 August 1997	list^{[A]}
16852 Nuredduna	21 December 1997	list^{[A]}
(19506) 1998 MN_{4}	18 June 1998	list^{[A]}
(19756) 2000 EW_{50}	9 March 2000	list^{[A]}
(21654) 1999 PZ	5 August 1999	list^{[A]}
(22526) 1998 FV_{15}	22 March 1998	list^{[A]}
(23700) 1997 OZ	25 July 1997	list^{[A]}
25001 Pacheco	31 July 1998	list
(25010) 1998 PL_{1}	14 August 1998	list^{[A]}
(26965) 1997 RW_{2}	3 September 1997	list^{[A]}
27952 Atapuerca	11 August 1997	list^{[A]}
(29452) 1997 RV_{2}	3 September 1997	list^{[A]}
(29453) 1997 RU_{6}	5 September 1997	list^{[A]}
(31102) 1997 NP_{2}	4 July 1997	list^{[A]}
(31103) 1997 OE_{2}	29 July 1997	list^{[A]}
(31116) 1997 QM_{4}	29 August 1997	list^{[A]}
(31651) 1999 HH_{2}	19 April 1999	list^{[A]}
(31782) 1999 KM_{6}	21 May 1999	list^{[A]}
35725 Tramuntana	27 March 1999	list^{[A]}
(37777) 1997 GE_{32}	12 April 1997	list^{[A]}
(40039) 1998 KW_{26}	21 May 1998	list^{[A]}
(41058) 1999 VC_{24}	8 November 1999	list^{[A]}
(44906) 1999 VF_{23}	8 November 1999	list^{[A]}
(47096) 1999 AX_{25}	15 January 1999	list^{[A]}
(48860) 1998 HG_{24}	24 April 1998	list^{[A]}
(48961) 1998 QS_{26}	22 August 1998	list^{[A]}

Name	Discovery Date	Listing
(55866) 1997 PV_{4}	11 August 1997	list^{[A]}
(56216) 1999 HJ_{2}	19 April 1999	list^{[A]}
(58565) 1997 OC_{2}	29 July 1997	list^{[A]}
(58720) 1998 DD_{11}	19 February 1998	list^{[A]}
(59495) 1999 JB_{6}	6 May 1999	list^{[A]}
(66007) 1998 PO	3 August 1998	list
(66175) 1998 WD_{4}	20 November 1998	list^{[A]}
(69556) 1997 SA_{31}	27 September 1997	list^{[A]}
(74090) 1998 QU	18 August 1998	list^{[A]}
(74566) 1999 NE_{5}	10 July 1999	list^{[A]}
(75078) 1999 VG_{23}	8 November 1999	list^{[A]}
(79401) 1997 HT_{2}	25 April 1997	list^{[A]}
(79425) 1997 OA_{1}	25 July 1997	list^{[A]}
(85648) 1998 PF_{1}	11 August 1998	list
(100753) 1998 FN_{1}	19 March 1998	list^{[A]}
(102618) 1999 VJ_{23}	8 November 1999	list^{[A]}
(129586) 1997 TE_{18}	3 October 1997	list^{[A]}
(129649) 1998 MM_{4}	18 June 1998	list^{[A]}
(137507) 1999 VH_{23}	8 November 1999	list^{[A]}
(147367) 2003 CA_{20}	9 February 2003	list^{[A]}
(152638) 1997 OD_{2}	29 July 1997	list^{[A]}
(152827) 1999 VA_{24}	8 November 1999	list^{[A]}
(178383) 1997 PD_{4}	5 August 1997	list^{[A]}
(189422) 1997 OB_{2}	29 July 1997	list^{[A]}
(200129) 1997 SZ_{30}	27 September 1997	list^{[A]}
(221994) 1997 PT_{4}	11 August 1997	list^{[A]}
(231764) 1999 VB_{24}	8 November 1999	list^{[A]}
(243580) 1997 PG_{1}	5 August 1997	list^{[A]}
Co-discovery made with:^{A} R. Pacheco

== See also ==
- List of minor planet discoverers § A. Lopez-J.
