= (31669) 1999 JT6 =

Earth-crossing asteroid

Discovery
- Discovered by: LINEAR
- Discovery site: Lincoln Lab's ETS
- Discovery date: 12 May 1999

Designations
- Minor planet category: NEO · Apollo · PHA

Orbital characteristics
- Epoch 13 January 2016 (JD 2457400.5)
- Uncertainty parameter 0
- Observation arc: 5209 days (14.26 yr)
- Aphelion: 3.3709 AU (504.28 Gm)
- Perihelion: 0.90316 AU (135.111 Gm)
- Semi-major axis: 2.1370 AU (319.69 Gm)
- Eccentricity: 0.57737
- Orbital period (sidereal): 3.12 yr (1141.1 d)
- Average orbital speed: .3158 deg/day
- Mean anomaly: 167.37°
- Mean motion: 0° 18^{m} 55.8^{s} / day
- Inclination: 9.5420°
- Longitude of ascending node: 78.848°
- Argument of perihelion: 39.099°
- Earth MOID: 0.000613623 AU (91,796.7 km)

Physical characteristics
- Synodic rotation period: 5.807 h (0.2420 d)
- Absolute magnitude (H): 16.0

(31669) 1999 JT_{6} is an Earth-crossing asteroid belonging to the Apollo family of asteroids which also crosses the orbit of Mars. 1999 JT6 is the asteroid's temporary discovery name. It has now been assigned a permanent number from the Minor Planet Center (31669) indicating that its orbit has been confirmed, but has not (at least so far) been assigned a name. Only a small fraction of asteroids have been named.

It has an Earth minimum orbit intersection distance of 0.00354 AU (328,978 miles), which is close enough to classify it as a potentially hazardous asteroid (PHA). It will make a close approach to Earth on 14 December 2076 at 0.0260 AU (2,506,321 miles) and an even closer approach to the minor planet Ceres on 16 Feb 2084 at 0.0171 AU (1,587,064 miles).

Orbit of asteroid (31669) 1999 JT6 viewed from the north ecliptic pole at the epoch of 1 January 2010

Line of intersection of orbits of asteroid (31669) 1999 JT6 and Earth's ecliptic plane
