= Vlasta Kálalová =

Vlasta Kálalová Di Lotti
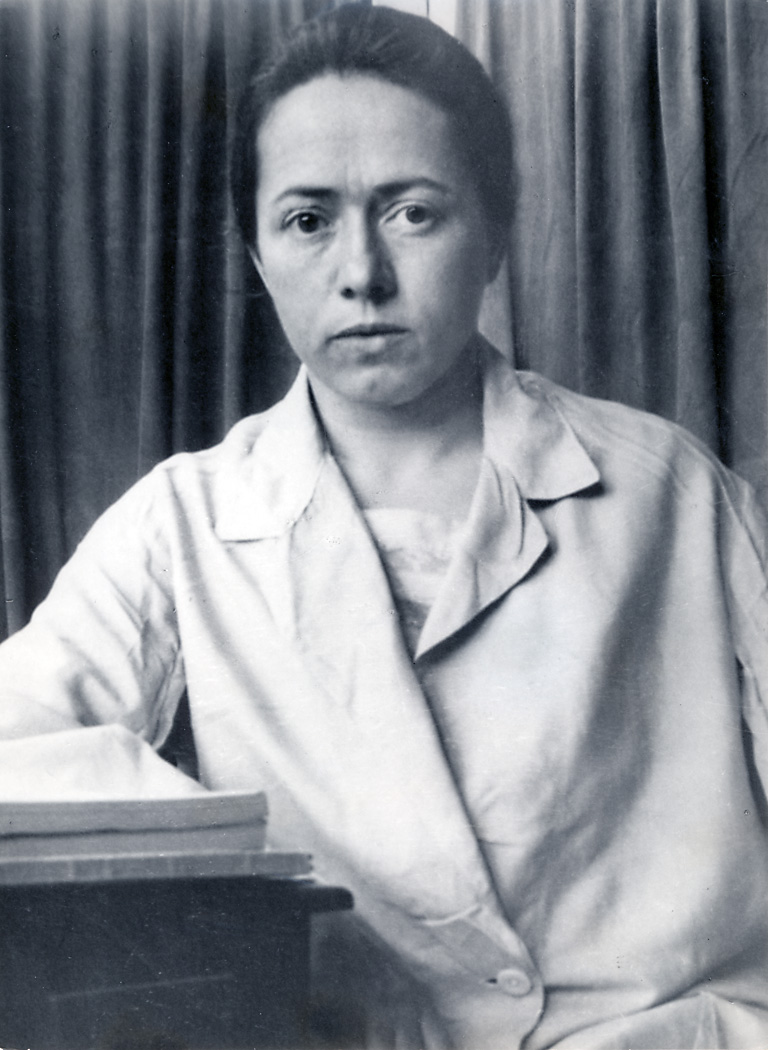
- Born: 26 October 1896; Bernartice, Bohemia, Austria-Hungary
- Died: 15 February 1971 (aged 74); Písek, Czechoslovakia
- Spouse: Giorgio Di Lotti (m. 1927–1945)
- Children: Radbor Kálal Di Lotti; Drahomila Lydie Kálalová Di Lotti

Vlasta Kálalová Di Lotti (26 October 1896 – 15 February 1971) was a Czech medical doctor interested in tropical diseases and entomology.

== Biography ==
Kálalová was born in Bernartice, Bohemia, Austria-Hungary (now the Czech Republic). Her father Jan Kálal was a teacher and zealous breeder of rabbits. He was very supportive of her education. Simultaneously, she studied medicine (she specialized in surgery), Arabic and Persian at Charles University in Prague. She graduated with honours in 1922. Female surgeons were quite extraordinary in Czechoslovakia in the early 1920s. After attending a lecture on exotic parasitology given by professor Jaroslav Hlava, she became interested in tropical diseases and their treatment. Later she focused on examining the so-called "Baghdad boils". She established the Czechoslovak Surgical Institute in Baghdad, where she worked both as a director and surgeon between 1925 and 1932. She was soon nicknamed "Albert Schweitzer in a skirt". She was so respected that she even treated some members of the Iraqi Royal Family. In Iraq she started collecting various kinds of local insects which she preserved and sent to the Czech National Museum. During the years spent in Baghdad, she enriched the museum with 500,000 specimens; some of them had not been explored before and were named after her. She married Italian Giorgio Di Lotti and they had two children – Radbor and Drahomila Lydia. However, she was still obsessed with work; she did not go on maternity leave and continued to work in the hospital. Later she became ill with feared dengue fever which confined her to bed for a few months. In 1932, she came back to Czechoslovakia where she recovered.

Her entire family was wiped out by accidental shooting from German troops on 8 May 1945, at the very moment when the Czechs were being finally liberated. She barely survived the accident herself with two bullets shot at her. Many reports show that the "shooting" was not accidental at all, rather it was an execution style by the Nazi. She herself survived only because the killers believed she was dead among all those that they killed. Additional reports show that her husband and children were killed by the Nazi first in front of her eyes as a form of punishment. In 1947, she attended an international women's conference in United States, held by Eleanor Roosevelt. Here she befriended the Norwegian author Ingeborg Refling Hagen among others. Under the Communist regime, Kálalová strongly protested against the death sentence for Milada Horáková who was executed on charges of conspiracy and treason in 1950.

Apart from her medical skills, Kálalová had a gift for languages. She was fluent in fourteen foreign languages: in English, French, German, Russian, Italian, Spanish, Turkish, Arabic, Persian, Norwegian, Icelandic, modern Greek, Tajik and Georgian. She also worked as a translator.

She died in Písek.

== Awards and honours ==
Kálalová received the Order of Tomáš Garrigue Masaryk in 1992.

Asteroid 66934 Kálalová, discovered by Jana Tichá and Miloš Tichý at Kleť Observatory in 1999, was named in her memory. The official naming citation was published by the Minor Planet Center on 21 July 2005 (M.P.C. 54567).
