= Meanings of minor-planet names: 66001–67000 =

As minor planet discoveries are confirmed, they are given a permanent number by the IAU's Minor Planet Center (MPC), and the discoverers can then submit names for them, following the IAU's naming conventions. The list below concerns those minor planets in the specified number-range that have received names, and explains the meanings of those names.

Official naming citations of newly named small Solar System bodies are approved and published in a bulletin by IAU's Working Group for Small Bodies Nomenclature (WGSBN). Before May 2021, citations were published in MPC's Minor Planet Circulars for many decades. Recent citations can also be found on the JPL Small-Body Database (SBDB). Until his death in 2016, German astronomer Lutz D. Schmadel compiled these citations into the Dictionary of Minor Planet Names (DMP) and regularly updated the collection.

Based on Paul Herget's The Names of the Minor Planets, Schmadel also researched the unclear origin of numerous asteroids, most of which had been named prior to World War II. This article incorporates text from this source, which is in the public domain: SBDB New namings may only be added to this list below after official publication as the preannouncement of names is condemned. The WGSBN publishes a comprehensive guideline for the naming rules of non-cometary small Solar System bodies.

== 66001–66100 ==
Named minor planet	Provisional	This minor planet was named for...	Ref · Catalog
66002 Shadoks	1998 OL_{5}	Les Shadoks was a French animated television series broadcast from 1968 to 1974.	IAU · 66002
66097 Maximelebreton	1998 SB_{11}	Maxime Lebreton, French electronics engineer working at the École Normale Supérieure in Paris.	IAU · 66097

== 66101–66200 ==
back to top

Named minor planet	Provisional	This minor planet was named for...	Ref · Catalog
66144 Célinereylé	1998 SJ_{171}	Céline Reylé, French astronomer.	IAU · 66144
66151 Josefhanuš	1998 UL	Josef Hanuš (born 1983) is a Czech planetary astronomer. He has worked on modeling rotation states and shapes of small Solar System bodies using the technique of rotation lightcurve inversion, and on their physical modeling using also infrared observations, stellar occultation data and adaptive optics observations.	JPL · 66151
66197 Isabosc	1999 BO_{6}	Isabelle Bosc, French researcher at the Centre de Recherche Astrophysique de Lyon, specializing mainly in optical interferometry (OI).	IAU · 66197
66198 Micheltallon	1999 BH_{11}	Michel Tallon, French researcher.	IAU · 66198
66200 Gibis	1999 BT_{13}	The Gibis were characters in the French animated television series Les Shadoks.	IAU · 66200

== 66201–66300 ==
back to top

Named minor planet	Provisional	This minor planet was named for...	Ref · Catalog
66207 Carpi	1999 CB_{1}	Carpi, a town in northern Italy, is known worldwide for its textile (especially knitwear) manufacturing and mechanical (especially woodworking) machinery.	JPL · 66207
66250 Giovanardi	1999 GZ	Stefano Giovanardi (b. 1972), an Italian astronomer and science communicator.	IAU · 66250

== 66301–66400 ==
back to top

Named minor planet	Provisional	This minor planet was named for...	Ref · Catalog
66391 Moshup	1999 KW_{4}	Moshup was a giant who lived in the coastal areas of New England, according to Native American legends, and was responsible for a variety of geologic features. As a way of maintaining balance, he married Granny Squannit, a leader of the Makiawasug, or Little People, who lived nearby. Squannit was a medicine woman of the Makiawasug who married the giant Moshup. Bad weather was attributed to times when the pair would argue. Moshup is the name of the primary, Squannit that for the satellite.	JPL · 66391

== 66401–66500 ==
back to top

Named minor planet	Provisional	This minor planet was named for...	Ref · Catalog
66454 Terezabeatriz	1999 PM	Tereza Beatriz Braga (1948–2016) was a psychologist, psychopedagogue and Brazilian teacher, and wife of the amateur astronomer Joo Ribeiro de Barros. She sponsored the SONEAR Observatory (Oliveira-MG). A lover of the stars, she did much to spread astronomy among schoolchildren.	JPL · 66454
66458 Romaplanetario	1999 QV_{1}	The planetarium in Rome, Italian: Planetario di Roma, where the discoverer, Gianluca Masi, introduced visitors to the wonders of the Universe. A new planetarium opened in 2004, replacing the older one which closed in 1984.	JPL · 66458
66479 Healy	1999 RQ_{33}	David H. Healy (1936–2011), American astrophotographer and discoverer of minor planets, an original contributor to Burnham's Celestial handbook. He established the Junk Bond Observatory in Arizona, known for visual work and recoveries of minor planets. The observatory has been the site of over 60 new discoveries.	JPL · 66479
66480 Riese	1999 RW_{33}	Jobst-Peter Riese, German amateur radio astronomer.	IAU · 66480

== 66501–66600 ==
back to top

Named minor planet	Provisional	This minor planet was named for...	Ref · Catalog
66583 Nicandra	1999 RL_{156}	Nicandra is a genus of flowering plants in the nightshade family containing the single species Nicandra physalodes. While the genus is named for Greek poet Nicander, it is known by the common names "apple-of-Peru" and "shoo-fly plant." Its flowers are bell-shaped, pale violet with white throats.	JPL · 66583

== 66601–66700 ==
back to top

Named minor planet	Provisional	This minor planet was named for...	Ref · Catalog
66652 Borasisi	1999 RZ_{253}	Along with its moon, Pabu, the mythical personifications of the Sun (Borasisi) and Moon (Pabu) in the fictional cosmogony of "Bokononism" described in Kurt Vonnegut's Cat's Cradle	JPL · 66652
66661 Wallin	1999 TK_{2}	John F. Wallin (born 1961), an American astrophysicist at George Mason University, Virginia. He is an educator and researcher of stellar formation, galactic dynamics and the presence and effects of non-baryonic matter in the Solar System.	JPL · 66661
66667 Kambič	1999 TZ_{11}	Bojan Kambič (born 1959), Slovenian founder and editor of the astronomical magazine Spika, regularly published since 1993. Spika greatly influenced the Slovenian astronomical community, boosted various astronomical activities and thoroughly changed the face of astronomy in Slovenia.	JPL · 66667
66669 Aradac	1999 TE_{15}	The Serbian village of Aradac located in the Autonomous Province of Vojvodina, where Slovaks have been living in close fraternal ties with Serbs for centuries	JPL · 66669
66671 Sfasu	1999 TJ_{17}	Stephen F. Austin State University (the minor planet was discovered at the university's observatory)	JPL · 66671

== 66701–66800 ==
back to top

Named minor planet	Provisional	This minor planet was named for...	Ref · Catalog
There are no named minor planets in this number range

== 66801–66900 ==
back to top

Named minor planet	Provisional	This minor planet was named for...	Ref · Catalog
66843 Pulido	1999 VG	Alfonso Pulido (born 1945), Spanish astronomical computer programmer, developer of the Elbrus software used by amateur and professional astronomers around the globe to derive the center of configurations of stars for use in high-precision telescope control.	JPL · 66843
66846 Franklederer	1999 VP_{2}	Louis Franklin Lederer (1935–2009) was a director of Instrumentation Specialties Co. in Lincoln, Nebraska, and an inventor who was granted patents in 1975 and 1976 for devices measuring flow rates and air and water quality. These devices are now commonly used in the U.S., Canada and Europe.	JPL · 66846
66856 Stephenvoss	1999 VW_{22}	Stephen Voss (born 1966) is a New Zealand-born general physician and noted amateur astronomer and astrophotographer. He founded the Aurora Australis Facebook page.	IAU · 66856
66885 Wangxiaomo	1999 VH_{72}	Wang Xiaomo (b. 1938), a Chinese radar and electronic technology expert.	IAU · 66885

== 66901–67000 ==
back to top

Named minor planet	Provisional	This minor planet was named for...	Ref · Catalog
66934 Kálalová	1999 WF_{1}	Vlasta Kálalová (1896–1971), a Czech medical doctor interested in tropical diseases and entomology, came from the southern Bohemian town of Bernartice. In 1925, she founded the Mustausaf Czechoslovak hospital in Baghdad, Iraq, with a special focus on health services for women.	JPL · 66934
66939 Franscini	1999 WQ_{8}	Stefano Franscini (1796–1857), Swiss politician and statistician. He was one of the initial members of the Swiss Federal Council elected in 1848 and Switzerland's first native Italian speaking federal councillor.	JPL · 66939
66999 Cudnik	1999 XX_{115}	Brian Cudnik (born 1969) is an astronomer, author, and educator. In 1999 he visually observed the first scientifically confirmed lunar meteoroid impact. He has coordinated the Lunar Meteoritic Impact Search section of the Association of Lunar and Planetary Observers and served as Chief Editor of the Encyclopedia of Lunar Science.	IAU · 66999

back to top

Preceded by 65,001–66,000	Meanings of minor-planet names List of minor planets: 66,001–67,000	Succeeded by 67,001–68,000
