= Robert Linderholm =

American astronomer

Minor planets discovered: 26
see § List of discovered minor planets

Robert Glen Linderholm (October 19, 1933 – July 6, 2013) was an American amateur astronomer who discovered several asteroids. He lived in Cambridge, Nebraska where he had a private observatory, Lime Creek.

== List of discovered minor planets ==
10195 Nebraska	13 September 1996	list
10392 Brace	11 September 1997	list
11726 Edgerton	1 May 1998	list
14969 Willacather	28 August 1997	list
16750 Marisandoz	18 August 1996	list
19294 Weymouth	6 August 1996	list
19407 Standing Bear	25 March 1998	list
(20328) 1998 HS_{42}	30 April 1998	list
(23763) 1998 MP_{7}	24 June 1998	list
24918 Tedkooser	10 March 1997	list
(27909) 1996 TD_{11}	14 October 1996	list
(28005) 1997 XC	1 December 1997	list
(31054) 1996 RT_{5}	13 September 1996	list
(33051) 1997 UF_{7}	27 October 1997	list
(46670) 1996 NU	15 July 1996	list

(48702) 1996 JE	6 May 1996	list
49109 Agnesraab	18 September 1998	list
(52688) 1998 FL_{1}	21 March 1998	list
(53008) 1998 VY_{5}	13 November 1998	list
66846 Franklederer	6 November 1999	list
(70721) 1999 VD	1 November 1999	list
(75057) 1999 VR_{4}	7 November 1999	list
(91598) 1999 TK_{13}	11 October 1999	list
(129539) 1996 NO_{1}	15 July 1996	list
(275312) 2010 TE_{142}	25 January 2001	list
(362588) 2010 VN_{175}	17 June 1996	list
