= List of minor planets: 66001–67000 =

The following is a partial list of minor planets, running from minor-planet number 66001 through 67000, inclusive. The primary data for this and other partial lists is based on JPL's "Small-Body Orbital Elements" and data available from the Minor Planet Center. Critical list information is also provided by the MPC, unless otherwise specified from Lowell Observatory. A detailed description of the table's columns and additional sources are given on the main page including a complete list of every page in this series, and a statistical break-up on the dynamical classification of minor planets.

Also see the summary list of all named bodies in numerical and alphabetical order, and the corresponding naming citations for the number range of this particular list. New namings may only be added to this list after official publication, as the preannouncement of names is condemned by the Working Group for Small Bodies Nomenclature of the International Astronomical Union.

Near-Earth obj.	MBA (inner)	MBA (outer)	Centaur
Mars-crosser	MBA (middle)	Jupiter trojan	Trans-Neptunian obj.
Unclassified

== 66001–66100 ==
Designation			Discovery			Properties		Ref
Permanent	Provisional	Named after	Date	Site	Discoverer(s)	Category	Diam.	Ref
66001	1998 OG_{1}	—	July 17, 1998	Woomera	F. B. Zoltowski	EUN	3.8 km	MPC · JPL
66002 Shadoks	1998 OL_{5}	Shadoks	July 29, 1998	Caussols	ODAS	·	1.6 km	MPC · JPL
66003	1998 OX_{6}	—	July 20, 1998	Xinglong	SCAP	·	7.6 km	MPC · JPL
66004	1998 OV_{9}	—	July 26, 1998	La Silla	E. W. Elst	HYG	5.7 km	MPC · JPL
66005	1998 OA_{12}	—	July 22, 1998	Reedy Creek	J. Broughton	slow	5.4 km	MPC · JPL
66006	1998 OW_{13}	—	July 26, 1998	La Silla	E. W. Elst	·	2.0 km	MPC · JPL
66007	1998 PO	—	August 3, 1998	Majorca	Á. López J.	PAD	11 km	MPC · JPL
66008	1998 QH_{2}	—	August 20, 1998	Anderson Mesa	LONEOS	APO +1km	1.5 km	MPC · JPL
66009	1998 QZ_{8}	—	August 17, 1998	Socorro	LINEAR	·	5.0 km	MPC · JPL
66010	1998 QO_{15}	—	August 17, 1998	Socorro	LINEAR	EMA	7.3 km	MPC · JPL
66011	1998 QR_{17}	—	August 17, 1998	Socorro	LINEAR	PAD	9.8 km	MPC · JPL
66012	1998 QM_{23}	—	August 17, 1998	Socorro	LINEAR	·	4.3 km	MPC · JPL
66013	1998 QC_{24}	—	August 17, 1998	Socorro	LINEAR	NAE	12 km	MPC · JPL
66014	1998 QW_{24}	—	August 17, 1998	Socorro	LINEAR	·	4.4 km	MPC · JPL
66015	1998 QW_{25}	—	August 17, 1998	Socorro	LINEAR	GEF	3.5 km	MPC · JPL
66016	1998 QX_{27}	—	August 24, 1998	Kitt Peak	Spacewatch	EMA	11 km	MPC · JPL
66017	1998 QC_{30}	—	August 26, 1998	Xinglong	SCAP	·	5.2 km	MPC · JPL
66018	1998 QA_{31}	—	August 17, 1998	Socorro	LINEAR	EOS	7.8 km	MPC · JPL
66019	1998 QE_{31}	—	August 17, 1998	Socorro	LINEAR	·	3.6 km	MPC · JPL
66020	1998 QN_{31}	—	August 17, 1998	Socorro	LINEAR	NYS	1.7 km	MPC · JPL
66021	1998 QZ_{34}	—	August 17, 1998	Socorro	LINEAR	·	6.3 km	MPC · JPL
66022	1998 QU_{42}	—	August 17, 1998	Socorro	LINEAR	EOS	7.3 km	MPC · JPL
66023	1998 QS_{43}	—	August 17, 1998	Socorro	LINEAR	·	2.1 km	MPC · JPL
66024	1998 QZ_{45}	—	August 17, 1998	Socorro	LINEAR	·	4.1 km	MPC · JPL
66025	1998 QP_{46}	—	August 17, 1998	Socorro	LINEAR	·	6.0 km	MPC · JPL
66026	1998 QK_{48}	—	August 17, 1998	Socorro	LINEAR	EOS	5.0 km	MPC · JPL
66027	1998 QH_{49}	—	August 17, 1998	Socorro	LINEAR	·	5.3 km	MPC · JPL
66028	1998 QU_{51}	—	August 17, 1998	Socorro	LINEAR	HYG	6.0 km	MPC · JPL
66029	1998 QC_{61}	—	August 23, 1998	Anderson Mesa	LONEOS	·	5.7 km	MPC · JPL
66030	1998 QY_{64}	—	August 24, 1998	Socorro	LINEAR	·	8.2 km	MPC · JPL
66031	1998 QE_{68}	—	August 24, 1998	Socorro	LINEAR	ADE	6.5 km	MPC · JPL
66032	1998 QK_{68}	—	August 24, 1998	Socorro	LINEAR	·	10 km	MPC · JPL
66033	1998 QV_{69}	—	August 24, 1998	Socorro	LINEAR	EMA	8.0 km	MPC · JPL
66034	1998 QY_{69}	—	August 24, 1998	Socorro	LINEAR	GEF	4.0 km	MPC · JPL
66035	1998 QA_{70}	—	August 24, 1998	Socorro	LINEAR	·	5.4 km	MPC · JPL
66036	1998 QZ_{73}	—	August 24, 1998	Socorro	LINEAR	·	5.7 km	MPC · JPL
66037	1998 QD_{74}	—	August 24, 1998	Socorro	LINEAR	EOS	4.7 km	MPC · JPL
66038	1998 QM_{74}	—	August 24, 1998	Socorro	LINEAR	·	6.2 km	MPC · JPL
66039	1998 QS_{74}	—	August 24, 1998	Socorro	LINEAR	·	10 km	MPC · JPL
66040	1998 QQ_{75}	—	August 24, 1998	Socorro	LINEAR	·	7.3 km	MPC · JPL
66041	1998 QZ_{77}	—	August 24, 1998	Socorro	LINEAR	·	9.9 km	MPC · JPL
66042	1998 QA_{78}	—	August 24, 1998	Socorro	LINEAR	·	5.7 km	MPC · JPL
66043	1998 QH_{79}	—	August 24, 1998	Socorro	LINEAR	·	4.4 km	MPC · JPL
66044	1998 QU_{82}	—	August 24, 1998	Socorro	LINEAR	·	5.7 km	MPC · JPL
66045	1998 QJ_{84}	—	August 24, 1998	Socorro	LINEAR	·	3.8 km	MPC · JPL
66046	1998 QJ_{85}	—	August 24, 1998	Socorro	LINEAR	·	7.8 km	MPC · JPL
66047	1998 QL_{85}	—	August 24, 1998	Socorro	LINEAR	TIR	7.4 km	MPC · JPL
66048	1998 QU_{85}	—	August 24, 1998	Socorro	LINEAR	·	7.0 km	MPC · JPL
66049	1998 QB_{86}	—	August 24, 1998	Socorro	LINEAR	·	8.6 km	MPC · JPL
66050	1998 QB_{87}	—	August 24, 1998	Socorro	LINEAR	URS · slow	13 km	MPC · JPL
66051	1998 QC_{87}	—	August 24, 1998	Socorro	LINEAR	EOS	4.3 km	MPC · JPL
66052	1998 QM_{87}	—	August 24, 1998	Socorro	LINEAR	·	6.8 km	MPC · JPL
66053	1998 QN_{87}	—	August 24, 1998	Socorro	LINEAR	·	4.9 km	MPC · JPL
66054	1998 QY_{88}	—	August 24, 1998	Socorro	LINEAR	EOS	5.4 km	MPC · JPL
66055	1998 QQ_{90}	—	August 28, 1998	Socorro	LINEAR	·	9.2 km	MPC · JPL
66056	1998 QM_{95}	—	August 19, 1998	Socorro	LINEAR	·	5.6 km	MPC · JPL
66057	1998 QP_{96}	—	August 19, 1998	Socorro	LINEAR	EOS	5.4 km	MPC · JPL
66058	1998 QQ_{97}	—	August 24, 1998	Socorro	LINEAR	·	4.5 km	MPC · JPL
66059	1998 QZ_{100}	—	August 26, 1998	La Silla	E. W. Elst	·	6.2 km	MPC · JPL
66060	1998 QB_{103}	—	August 26, 1998	La Silla	E. W. Elst	HYG	6.9 km	MPC · JPL
66061	1998 QN_{104}	—	August 26, 1998	La Silla	E. W. Elst	·	2.2 km	MPC · JPL
66062	1998 RG_{1}	—	September 10, 1998	Višnjan Observatory	Višnjan	LIX	12 km	MPC · JPL
66063	1998 RO_{1}	—	September 14, 1998	Socorro	LINEAR	ATE +1km · moon	830 m	MPC · JPL
66064	1998 RW_{4}	—	September 14, 1998	Socorro	LINEAR	H	1.2 km	MPC · JPL
66065	1998 RB_{13}	—	September 14, 1998	Kitt Peak	Spacewatch	THM	5.2 km	MPC · JPL
66066	1998 RO_{18}	—	September 14, 1998	Socorro	LINEAR	·	3.9 km	MPC · JPL
66067	1998 RM_{19}	—	September 14, 1998	Socorro	LINEAR	·	5.4 km	MPC · JPL
66068	1998 RG_{26}	—	September 14, 1998	Socorro	LINEAR	·	5.0 km	MPC · JPL
66069	1998 RK_{42}	—	September 14, 1998	Socorro	LINEAR	·	6.9 km	MPC · JPL
66070	1998 RP_{46}	—	September 14, 1998	Socorro	LINEAR	·	2.2 km	MPC · JPL
66071	1998 RS_{48}	—	September 14, 1998	Socorro	LINEAR	·	6.5 km	MPC · JPL
66072	1998 RW_{48}	—	September 14, 1998	Socorro	LINEAR	·	4.7 km	MPC · JPL
66073	1998 RJ_{50}	—	September 14, 1998	Socorro	LINEAR	·	7.7 km	MPC · JPL
66074	1998 RZ_{50}	—	September 14, 1998	Socorro	LINEAR	TIR	7.4 km	MPC · JPL
66075	1998 RT_{51}	—	September 14, 1998	Socorro	LINEAR	·	7.4 km	MPC · JPL
66076	1998 RD_{53}	—	September 14, 1998	Socorro	LINEAR	EOS	7.8 km	MPC · JPL
66077	1998 RL_{53}	—	September 14, 1998	Socorro	LINEAR	EOS	5.0 km	MPC · JPL
66078	1998 RW_{53}	—	September 14, 1998	Socorro	LINEAR	·	10 km	MPC · JPL
66079	1998 RA_{54}	—	September 14, 1998	Socorro	LINEAR	EOS	4.6 km	MPC · JPL
66080	1998 RV_{56}	—	September 14, 1998	Socorro	LINEAR	HYG	7.1 km	MPC · JPL
66081	1998 RY_{56}	—	September 14, 1998	Socorro	LINEAR	·	7.1 km	MPC · JPL
66082	1998 RZ_{58}	—	September 14, 1998	Socorro	LINEAR	·	7.7 km	MPC · JPL
66083	1998 RW_{61}	—	September 14, 1998	Socorro	LINEAR	·	4.3 km	MPC · JPL
66084	1998 RY_{63}	—	September 14, 1998	Socorro	LINEAR	VER	6.5 km	MPC · JPL
66085	1998 RG_{67}	—	September 14, 1998	Socorro	LINEAR	HYG	8.1 km	MPC · JPL
66086	1998 RL_{69}	—	September 14, 1998	Socorro	LINEAR	·	6.8 km	MPC · JPL
66087	1998 RW_{69}	—	September 14, 1998	Socorro	LINEAR	·	5.4 km	MPC · JPL
66088	1998 RE_{71}	—	September 14, 1998	Socorro	LINEAR	·	4.7 km	MPC · JPL
66089	1998 RQ_{73}	—	September 14, 1998	Socorro	LINEAR	·	6.9 km	MPC · JPL
66090	1998 RQ_{75}	—	September 14, 1998	Socorro	LINEAR	EOS	4.7 km	MPC · JPL
66091	1998 RM_{76}	—	September 14, 1998	Socorro	LINEAR	EOS	5.9 km	MPC · JPL
66092	1998 SD	—	September 16, 1998	Catalina	CSS	H · slow	2.0 km	MPC · JPL
66093	1998 SG	—	September 16, 1998	Kitt Peak	Spacewatch	·	7.6 km	MPC · JPL
66094	1998 SY_{1}	—	September 17, 1998	Caussols	ODAS	·	5.0 km	MPC · JPL
66095	1998 SP_{6}	—	September 20, 1998	Kitt Peak	Spacewatch	·	4.7 km	MPC · JPL
66096	1998 SS_{6}	—	September 20, 1998	Kitt Peak	Spacewatch	BRA	3.1 km	MPC · JPL
66097 Maximelebreton	1998 SB_{11}	Maximelebreton	September 17, 1998	Caussols	ODAS	EOS	5.1 km	MPC · JPL
66098	1998 SV_{12}	—	September 23, 1998	Catalina	CSS	·	11 km	MPC · JPL
66099	1998 SQ_{13}	—	September 23, 1998	Caussols	ODAS	THM	7.4 km	MPC · JPL
66100	1998 SG_{17}	—	September 17, 1998	Kitt Peak	Spacewatch	THM	6.1 km	MPC · JPL

== 66101–66200 ==
back to top

Designation			Discovery			Properties		Ref
Permanent	Provisional	Named after	Date	Site	Discoverer(s)	Category	Diam.	Ref
66101	1998 SK_{22}	—	September 23, 1998	Višnjan Observatory	Višnjan	·	7.2 km	MPC · JPL
66102	1998 SR_{22}	—	September 23, 1998	Višnjan Observatory	Višnjan	·	7.9 km	MPC · JPL
66103	1998 SJ_{24}	—	September 17, 1998	Anderson Mesa	LONEOS	·	5.7 km	MPC · JPL
66104	1998 SB_{25}	—	September 19, 1998	Anderson Mesa	LONEOS	·	2.5 km	MPC · JPL
66105	1998 SW_{25}	—	September 22, 1998	Anderson Mesa	LONEOS	·	6.5 km	MPC · JPL
66106	1998 SJ_{26}	—	September 22, 1998	Anderson Mesa	LONEOS	·	9.6 km	MPC · JPL
66107	1998 SM_{27}	—	September 24, 1998	Catalina	CSS	H	1.3 km	MPC · JPL
66108	1998 SX_{34}	—	September 26, 1998	Socorro	LINEAR	H	1.2 km	MPC · JPL
66109	1998 SB_{35}	—	September 26, 1998	Socorro	LINEAR	H	1.3 km	MPC · JPL
66110	1998 SQ_{37}	—	September 21, 1998	Kitt Peak	Spacewatch	·	5.0 km	MPC · JPL
66111	1998 SY_{39}	—	September 23, 1998	Kitt Peak	Spacewatch	V	1.5 km	MPC · JPL
66112	1998 SP_{45}	—	September 25, 1998	Kitt Peak	Spacewatch	·	1.2 km	MPC · JPL
66113	1998 SG_{55}	—	September 16, 1998	Anderson Mesa	LONEOS	·	5.7 km	MPC · JPL
66114	1998 SG_{68}	—	September 19, 1998	Socorro	LINEAR	·	6.8 km	MPC · JPL
66115	1998 ST_{68}	—	September 19, 1998	Socorro	LINEAR	(58892)	7.7 km	MPC · JPL
66116	1998 SU_{68}	—	September 19, 1998	Socorro	LINEAR	·	13 km	MPC · JPL
66117	1998 SV_{69}	—	September 21, 1998	Socorro	LINEAR	·	2.4 km	MPC · JPL
66118	1998 SL_{71}	—	September 21, 1998	La Silla	E. W. Elst	·	6.2 km	MPC · JPL
66119	1998 SE_{72}	—	September 21, 1998	La Silla	E. W. Elst	·	7.1 km	MPC · JPL
66120	1998 SF_{74}	—	September 21, 1998	La Silla	E. W. Elst	·	2.8 km	MPC · JPL
66121	1998 SF_{81}	—	September 26, 1998	Socorro	LINEAR	EOS	3.9 km	MPC · JPL
66122	1998 SC_{87}	—	September 26, 1998	Socorro	LINEAR	·	3.8 km	MPC · JPL
66123	1998 SD_{87}	—	September 26, 1998	Socorro	LINEAR	·	6.9 km	MPC · JPL
66124	1998 SC_{111}	—	September 26, 1998	Socorro	LINEAR	·	5.9 km	MPC · JPL
66125	1998 SA_{112}	—	September 26, 1998	Socorro	LINEAR	HYG	9.3 km	MPC · JPL
66126	1998 SX_{112}	—	September 26, 1998	Socorro	LINEAR	EUN	4.6 km	MPC · JPL
66127	1998 SQ_{114}	—	September 26, 1998	Socorro	LINEAR	·	4.6 km	MPC · JPL
66128	1998 SV_{114}	—	September 26, 1998	Socorro	LINEAR	THM	6.1 km	MPC · JPL
66129	1998 SA_{117}	—	September 26, 1998	Socorro	LINEAR	EOS	4.0 km	MPC · JPL
66130	1998 SM_{117}	—	September 26, 1998	Socorro	LINEAR	·	9.5 km	MPC · JPL
66131	1998 SA_{123}	—	September 26, 1998	Socorro	LINEAR	THM	5.8 km	MPC · JPL
66132	1998 SP_{126}	—	September 26, 1998	Socorro	LINEAR	EOS	5.0 km	MPC · JPL
66133	1998 SR_{127}	—	September 26, 1998	Socorro	LINEAR	EOS	6.7 km	MPC · JPL
66134	1998 SV_{127}	—	September 26, 1998	Socorro	LINEAR	·	5.1 km	MPC · JPL
66135	1998 SX_{131}	—	September 26, 1998	Socorro	LINEAR	·	4.7 km	MPC · JPL
66136	1998 SN_{133}	—	September 26, 1998	Socorro	LINEAR	·	6.1 km	MPC · JPL
66137	1998 SR_{136}	—	September 26, 1998	Socorro	LINEAR	·	3.3 km	MPC · JPL
66138	1998 SE_{137}	—	September 26, 1998	Socorro	LINEAR	HYG	9.1 km	MPC · JPL
66139	1998 SH_{138}	—	September 26, 1998	Socorro	LINEAR	·	5.2 km	MPC · JPL
66140	1998 SQ_{139}	—	September 26, 1998	Socorro	LINEAR	EOS	7.1 km	MPC · JPL
66141	1998 SG_{142}	—	September 26, 1998	Socorro	LINEAR	·	3.0 km	MPC · JPL
66142	1998 SN_{145}	—	September 20, 1998	La Silla	E. W. Elst	·	2.8 km	MPC · JPL
66143	1998 SE_{161}	—	September 26, 1998	Socorro	LINEAR	EOS	6.1 km	MPC · JPL
66144 Célinereylé	1998 SJ_{171}	Célinereylé	September 18, 1998	Caussols	ODAS	·	1.6 km	MPC · JPL
66145	1998 TM	—	October 10, 1998	Oizumi	T. Kobayashi	EOS	4.6 km	MPC · JPL
66146	1998 TU_{3}	—	October 13, 1998	Socorro	LINEAR	ATE +1km	2.9 km	MPC · JPL
66147	1998 TC_{10}	—	October 12, 1998	Kitt Peak	Spacewatch	THM	8.3 km	MPC · JPL
66148	1998 TD_{11}	—	October 12, 1998	Kitt Peak	Spacewatch	AGN	2.7 km	MPC · JPL
66149	1998 TS_{33}	—	October 14, 1998	Anderson Mesa	LONEOS	THM	7.6 km	MPC · JPL
66150	1998 UF	—	October 17, 1998	Catalina	CSS	H	1.6 km	MPC · JPL
66151 Josefhanuš	1998 UL	Josefhanuš	October 16, 1998	Ondřejov	P. Pravec	EOS	6.2 km	MPC · JPL
66152	1998 UU	—	October 16, 1998	Catalina	CSS	H	1.5 km	MPC · JPL
66153	1998 UV	—	October 16, 1998	Catalina	CSS	H	1.3 km	MPC · JPL
66154	1998 UK_{19}	—	October 28, 1998	Socorro	LINEAR	H	990 m	MPC · JPL
66155	1998 UR_{24}	—	October 18, 1998	Anderson Mesa	LONEOS	(3460)	6.0 km	MPC · JPL
66156	1998 UV_{25}	—	October 18, 1998	La Silla	E. W. Elst	·	3.4 km	MPC · JPL
66157	1998 UJ_{26}	—	October 18, 1998	La Silla	E. W. Elst	·	6.0 km	MPC · JPL
66158	1998 UJ_{27}	—	October 18, 1998	La Silla	E. W. Elst	·	6.7 km	MPC · JPL
66159	1998 UN_{36}	—	October 28, 1998	Socorro	LINEAR	·	7.9 km	MPC · JPL
66160	1998 UC_{38}	—	October 28, 1998	Socorro	LINEAR	·	3.8 km	MPC · JPL
66161	1998 UG_{40}	—	October 28, 1998	Socorro	LINEAR	HYG	7.1 km	MPC · JPL
66162	1998 UG_{49}	—	October 18, 1998	Anderson Mesa	LONEOS	·	3.9 km	MPC · JPL
66163	1998 VB	—	November 7, 1998	Oizumi	T. Kobayashi	·	2.2 km	MPC · JPL
66164	1998 VC_{8}	—	November 10, 1998	Socorro	LINEAR	EOS	5.7 km	MPC · JPL
66165	1998 VF_{10}	—	November 10, 1998	Socorro	LINEAR	·	2.8 km	MPC · JPL
66166	1998 VL_{25}	—	November 10, 1998	Socorro	LINEAR	·	1.6 km	MPC · JPL
66167	1998 VG_{28}	—	November 10, 1998	Socorro	LINEAR	fast	11 km	MPC · JPL
66168	1998 VK_{28}	—	November 10, 1998	Socorro	LINEAR	·	3.4 km	MPC · JPL
66169	1998 VO_{29}	—	November 10, 1998	Socorro	LINEAR	·	6.9 km	MPC · JPL
66170	1998 VJ_{30}	—	November 10, 1998	Socorro	LINEAR	·	15 km	MPC · JPL
66171	1998 VW_{36}	—	November 10, 1998	Socorro	LINEAR	·	7.1 km	MPC · JPL
66172	1998 VX_{45}	—	November 14, 1998	Anderson Mesa	LONEOS	fast	8.3 km	MPC · JPL
66173	1998 VE_{50}	—	November 11, 1998	Socorro	LINEAR	·	8.0 km	MPC · JPL
66174	1998 VZ_{52}	—	November 14, 1998	Socorro	LINEAR	(1101)	10 km	MPC · JPL
66175	1998 WD_{4}	—	November 20, 1998	Majorca	Á. López J., R. Pacheco	NYS	2.4 km	MPC · JPL
66176	1998 WR_{4}	—	November 18, 1998	Catalina	CSS	H	1.4 km	MPC · JPL
66177	1998 WE_{5}	—	November 21, 1998	Goodricke-Pigott	R. A. Tucker	(5651)	7.1 km	MPC · JPL
66178	1998 WL_{13}	—	November 21, 1998	Socorro	LINEAR	·	14 km	MPC · JPL
66179	1998 WB_{14}	—	November 21, 1998	Socorro	LINEAR	·	1.7 km	MPC · JPL
66180	1998 WD_{14}	—	November 21, 1998	Socorro	LINEAR	AGN	2.6 km	MPC · JPL
66181	1998 WL_{17}	—	November 21, 1998	Socorro	LINEAR	NYS ·	3.2 km	MPC · JPL
66182	1998 WC_{23}	—	November 18, 1998	Socorro	LINEAR	·	2.5 km	MPC · JPL
66183	1998 WJ_{33}	—	November 23, 1998	Anderson Mesa	LONEOS	·	7.8 km	MPC · JPL
66184	1998 XW_{2}	—	December 9, 1998	Socorro	LINEAR	·	2.2 km	MPC · JPL
66185	1998 XM_{47}	—	December 14, 1998	Socorro	LINEAR	·	12 km	MPC · JPL
66186	1998 XS_{49}	—	December 14, 1998	Socorro	LINEAR	EUN	4.0 km	MPC · JPL
66187	1998 XS_{73}	—	December 14, 1998	Socorro	LINEAR	HIL · 3:2 · (6124)	22 km	MPC · JPL
66188	1998 XK_{79}	—	December 15, 1998	Socorro	LINEAR	·	10 km	MPC · JPL
66189	1998 XA_{97}	—	December 12, 1998	Mérida	Naranjo, O. A.	·	1.7 km	MPC · JPL
66190	1998 YX_{5}	—	December 22, 1998	Farra d'Isonzo	Farra d'Isonzo	·	3.1 km	MPC · JPL
66191	1998 YS_{6}	—	December 19, 1998	Uenohara	N. Kawasato	THM	11 km	MPC · JPL
66192	1998 YW_{10}	—	December 18, 1998	Caussols	ODAS	·	1.8 km	MPC · JPL
66193	1999 AF_{22}	—	January 13, 1999	Xinglong	SCAP	(5)	2.7 km	MPC · JPL
66194	1999 AT_{23}	—	January 14, 1999	Anderson Mesa	LONEOS	PHO	3.0 km	MPC · JPL
66195	1999 AN_{25}	—	January 14, 1999	Socorro	LINEAR	H	1.7 km	MPC · JPL
66196	1999 AE_{34}	—	January 13, 1999	Anderson Mesa	LONEOS	·	2.2 km	MPC · JPL
66197 Isabosc	1999 BO_{6}	Isabosc	January 20, 1999	Caussols	ODAS	slow	4.0 km	MPC · JPL
66198 Micheltallon	1999 BH_{11}	Micheltallon	January 20, 1999	Caussols	ODAS	·	2.2 km	MPC · JPL
66199	1999 BF_{13}	—	January 24, 1999	Višnjan Observatory	K. Korlević	·	2.8 km	MPC · JPL
66200 Gibis	1999 BT_{13}	Gibis	January 20, 1999	Caussols	ODAS	·	3.7 km	MPC · JPL

== 66201–66300 ==
back to top

Designation			Discovery			Properties		Ref
Permanent	Provisional	Named after	Date	Site	Discoverer(s)	Category	Diam.	Ref
66201	1999 BC_{20}	—	January 16, 1999	Socorro	LINEAR	MAR	3.7 km	MPC · JPL
66202	1999 BJ_{21}	—	January 16, 1999	Socorro	LINEAR	MAR	5.7 km	MPC · JPL
66203	1999 BV_{24}	—	January 18, 1999	Socorro	LINEAR	·	5.7 km	MPC · JPL
66204	1999 BA_{26}	—	January 28, 1999	Gekko	T. Kagawa	·	2.3 km	MPC · JPL
66205	1999 BJ_{27}	—	January 16, 1999	Kitt Peak	Spacewatch	·	5.0 km	MPC · JPL
66206	1999 BQ_{31}	—	January 19, 1999	Kitt Peak	Spacewatch	·	1.6 km	MPC · JPL
66207 Carpi	1999 CB_{1}	Carpi	February 6, 1999	Cavezzo	Cavezzo	·	5.8 km	MPC · JPL
66208	1999 CQ_{6}	—	February 10, 1999	Socorro	LINEAR	·	1.3 km	MPC · JPL
66209	1999 CC_{14}	—	February 12, 1999	Uenohara	N. Kawasato	(5)	2.8 km	MPC · JPL
66210	1999 CR_{14}	—	February 15, 1999	Višnjan Observatory	K. Korlević	EUN	5.0 km	MPC · JPL
66211	1999 CA_{22}	—	February 10, 1999	Socorro	LINEAR	·	7.7 km	MPC · JPL
66212	1999 CS_{32}	—	February 10, 1999	Socorro	LINEAR	(883)	2.9 km	MPC · JPL
66213	1999 CQ_{33}	—	February 10, 1999	Socorro	LINEAR	·	3.3 km	MPC · JPL
66214	1999 CO_{36}	—	February 10, 1999	Socorro	LINEAR	·	5.9 km	MPC · JPL
66215	1999 CP_{38}	—	February 10, 1999	Socorro	LINEAR	THM	7.3 km	MPC · JPL
66216	1999 CJ_{42}	—	February 10, 1999	Socorro	LINEAR	KOR	3.9 km	MPC · JPL
66217	1999 CZ_{42}	—	February 10, 1999	Socorro	LINEAR	·	1.7 km	MPC · JPL
66218	1999 CU_{43}	—	February 10, 1999	Socorro	LINEAR	EOS	6.9 km	MPC · JPL
66219	1999 CR_{50}	—	February 10, 1999	Socorro	LINEAR	·	6.5 km	MPC · JPL
66220	1999 CZ_{68}	—	February 12, 1999	Socorro	LINEAR	V	1.6 km	MPC · JPL
66221	1999 CH_{73}	—	February 12, 1999	Socorro	LINEAR	·	3.3 km	MPC · JPL
66222	1999 CV_{75}	—	February 12, 1999	Socorro	LINEAR	EOS	6.9 km	MPC · JPL
66223	1999 CE_{77}	—	February 12, 1999	Socorro	LINEAR	MAR	4.3 km	MPC · JPL
66224	1999 CG_{77}	—	February 12, 1999	Socorro	LINEAR	·	1.5 km	MPC · JPL
66225	1999 CL_{79}	—	February 12, 1999	Socorro	LINEAR	·	2.5 km	MPC · JPL
66226	1999 CS_{89}	—	February 10, 1999	Socorro	LINEAR	·	2.6 km	MPC · JPL
66227	1999 CR_{109}	—	February 12, 1999	Socorro	LINEAR	HIL · 3:2	11 km	MPC · JPL
66228	1999 CY_{109}	—	February 12, 1999	Socorro	LINEAR	·	3.0 km	MPC · JPL
66229	1999 CH_{117}	—	February 12, 1999	Socorro	LINEAR	·	3.2 km	MPC · JPL
66230	1999 CV_{117}	—	February 12, 1999	Socorro	LINEAR	·	5.7 km	MPC · JPL
66231	1999 CD_{125}	—	February 11, 1999	Socorro	LINEAR	·	3.7 km	MPC · JPL
66232	1999 CL_{135}	—	February 8, 1999	Kitt Peak	Spacewatch	·	1.6 km	MPC · JPL
66233	1999 CC_{156}	—	February 14, 1999	Anderson Mesa	LONEOS	·	2.0 km	MPC · JPL
66234	1999 CZ_{157}	—	February 9, 1999	Kitt Peak	Spacewatch	·	2.7 km	MPC · JPL
66235	1999 ET	—	March 6, 1999	Kitt Peak	Spacewatch	·	1.9 km	MPC · JPL
66236	1999 EP_{3}	—	March 14, 1999	Reedy Creek	J. Broughton	·	3.0 km	MPC · JPL
66237	1999 ET_{5}	—	March 13, 1999	Goodricke-Pigott	R. A. Tucker	·	5.2 km	MPC · JPL
66238	1999 FZ	—	March 17, 1999	Caussols	ODAS	·	3.2 km	MPC · JPL
66239	1999 FK_{2}	—	March 16, 1999	Kitt Peak	Spacewatch	NAE	6.2 km	MPC · JPL
66240	1999 FJ_{9}	—	March 20, 1999	Anderson Mesa	LONEOS	·	3.1 km	MPC · JPL
66241	1999 FN_{17}	—	March 23, 1999	Kitt Peak	Spacewatch	·	3.2 km	MPC · JPL
66242	1999 FY_{17}	—	March 23, 1999	Kitt Peak	Spacewatch	·	4.6 km	MPC · JPL
66243	1999 FV_{28}	—	March 19, 1999	Socorro	LINEAR	·	2.7 km	MPC · JPL
66244	1999 FW_{28}	—	March 19, 1999	Socorro	LINEAR	·	1.5 km	MPC · JPL
66245	1999 FH_{29}	—	March 19, 1999	Socorro	LINEAR	V	1.8 km	MPC · JPL
66246	1999 FC_{30}	—	March 19, 1999	Socorro	LINEAR	·	1.9 km	MPC · JPL
66247	1999 FN_{34}	—	March 19, 1999	Socorro	LINEAR	·	2.6 km	MPC · JPL
66248	1999 FC_{37}	—	March 20, 1999	Socorro	LINEAR	MAR	4.5 km	MPC · JPL
66249	1999 FG_{48}	—	March 20, 1999	Socorro	LINEAR	(2076)	2.9 km	MPC · JPL
66250 Giovanardi	1999 GZ	Giovanardi	April 4, 1999	San Marcello	M. Tombelli, A. Boattini	·	4.2 km	MPC · JPL
66251	1999 GJ_{2}	—	April 7, 1999	Socorro	LINEAR	AMO +1km	1.2 km	MPC · JPL
66252	1999 GM_{2}	—	April 6, 1999	Višnjan Observatory	K. Korlević	·	3.2 km	MPC · JPL
66253	1999 GT_{3}	—	April 9, 1999	Socorro	LINEAR	APO	740 m	MPC · JPL
66254	1999 GZ_{19}	—	April 15, 1999	Socorro	LINEAR	·	3.0 km	MPC · JPL
66255	1999 GP_{31}	—	April 7, 1999	Socorro	LINEAR	NYS	2.1 km	MPC · JPL
66256	1999 GU_{33}	—	April 12, 1999	Socorro	LINEAR	·	2.4 km	MPC · JPL
66257	1999 GA_{34}	—	April 12, 1999	Socorro	LINEAR	·	3.2 km	MPC · JPL
66258	1999 GQ_{34}	—	April 6, 1999	Socorro	LINEAR	ERI	5.4 km	MPC · JPL
66259	1999 GP_{35}	—	April 7, 1999	Socorro	LINEAR	NYS ·	5.1 km	MPC · JPL
66260	1999 GZ_{35}	—	April 7, 1999	Socorro	LINEAR	·	2.2 km	MPC · JPL
66261	1999 GM_{37}	—	April 12, 1999	Socorro	LINEAR	·	2.8 km	MPC · JPL
66262	1999 GY_{49}	—	April 10, 1999	Anderson Mesa	LONEOS	NYS ·	4.4 km	MPC · JPL
66263	1999 GT_{58}	—	April 12, 1999	Socorro	LINEAR	·	4.9 km	MPC · JPL
66264	1999 HR	—	April 18, 1999	Reedy Creek	J. Broughton	·	1.5 km	MPC · JPL
66265	1999 HZ_{6}	—	April 19, 1999	Kitt Peak	Spacewatch	·	1.8 km	MPC · JPL
66266	1999 HQ_{9}	—	April 17, 1999	Socorro	LINEAR	·	2.0 km	MPC · JPL
66267	1999 JO_{1}	—	May 8, 1999	Catalina	CSS	·	2.7 km	MPC · JPL
66268	1999 JJ_{3}	—	May 7, 1999	Nachi-Katsuura	Y. Shimizu, T. Urata	V	3.0 km	MPC · JPL
66269	1999 JN_{3}	—	May 6, 1999	Socorro	LINEAR	PHO	3.7 km	MPC · JPL
66270	1999 JK_{4}	—	May 10, 1999	Socorro	LINEAR	PHO	2.6 km	MPC · JPL
66271	1999 JM_{6}	—	May 10, 1999	Socorro	LINEAR	·	2.3 km	MPC · JPL
66272	1999 JW_{6}	—	May 13, 1999	Socorro	LINEAR	AMO +1km · slow	810 m	MPC · JPL
66273	1999 JU_{7}	—	May 13, 1999	Reedy Creek	J. Broughton	·	1.4 km	MPC · JPL
66274	1999 JS_{8}	—	May 14, 1999	Reedy Creek	J. Broughton	·	4.8 km	MPC · JPL
66275	1999 JX_{8}	—	May 15, 1999	Fountain Hills	C. W. Juels	·	1.3 km	MPC · JPL
66276	1999 JG_{9}	—	May 7, 1999	Catalina	CSS	·	3.4 km	MPC · JPL
66277	1999 JY_{10}	—	May 14, 1999	Socorro	LINEAR	·	2.1 km	MPC · JPL
66278	1999 JC_{11}	—	May 9, 1999	Višnjan Observatory	K. Korlević	NYS	1.9 km	MPC · JPL
66279	1999 JK_{11}	—	May 12, 1999	Woomera	F. B. Zoltowski	·	2.3 km	MPC · JPL
66280	1999 JF_{12}	—	May 14, 1999	Socorro	LINEAR	·	3.2 km	MPC · JPL
66281	1999 JY_{12}	—	May 14, 1999	Catalina	CSS	·	2.8 km	MPC · JPL
66282	1999 JA_{13}	—	May 9, 1999	Višnjan Observatory	K. Korlević	·	2.5 km	MPC · JPL
66283	1999 JU_{13}	—	May 10, 1999	Socorro	LINEAR	·	5.2 km	MPC · JPL
66284	1999 JU_{15}	—	May 10, 1999	Socorro	LINEAR	(2076)	4.8 km	MPC · JPL
66285	1999 JV_{15}	—	May 10, 1999	Socorro	LINEAR	V	1.2 km	MPC · JPL
66286	1999 JF_{18}	—	May 10, 1999	Socorro	LINEAR	·	2.1 km	MPC · JPL
66287	1999 JT_{18}	—	May 10, 1999	Socorro	LINEAR	·	2.6 km	MPC · JPL
66288	1999 JE_{20}	—	May 10, 1999	Socorro	LINEAR	·	2.6 km	MPC · JPL
66289	1999 JW_{22}	—	May 10, 1999	Socorro	LINEAR	·	5.8 km	MPC · JPL
66290	1999 JX_{22}	—	May 10, 1999	Socorro	LINEAR	·	1.7 km	MPC · JPL
66291	1999 JM_{23}	—	May 10, 1999	Socorro	LINEAR	V	1.9 km	MPC · JPL
66292	1999 JP_{24}	—	May 10, 1999	Socorro	LINEAR	V	1.9 km	MPC · JPL
66293	1999 JD_{25}	—	May 10, 1999	Socorro	LINEAR	·	2.1 km	MPC · JPL
66294	1999 JS_{27}	—	May 10, 1999	Socorro	LINEAR	·	3.3 km	MPC · JPL
66295	1999 JC_{29}	—	May 10, 1999	Socorro	LINEAR	·	2.8 km	MPC · JPL
66296	1999 JM_{29}	—	May 10, 1999	Socorro	LINEAR	·	2.4 km	MPC · JPL
66297	1999 JF_{30}	—	May 10, 1999	Socorro	LINEAR	·	1.9 km	MPC · JPL
66298	1999 JJ_{30}	—	May 10, 1999	Socorro	LINEAR	·	3.6 km	MPC · JPL
66299	1999 JG_{32}	—	May 10, 1999	Socorro	LINEAR	·	3.2 km	MPC · JPL
66300	1999 JQ_{33}	—	May 10, 1999	Socorro	LINEAR	·	3.5 km	MPC · JPL

== 66301–66400 ==
back to top

Designation			Discovery			Properties		Ref
Permanent	Provisional	Named after	Date	Site	Discoverer(s)	Category	Diam.	Ref
66301	1999 JF_{35}	—	May 10, 1999	Socorro	LINEAR	·	1.4 km	MPC · JPL
66302	1999 JP_{36}	—	May 10, 1999	Socorro	LINEAR	·	6.8 km	MPC · JPL
66303	1999 JG_{37}	—	May 10, 1999	Socorro	LINEAR	·	2.6 km	MPC · JPL
66304	1999 JV_{37}	—	May 10, 1999	Socorro	LINEAR	·	2.4 km	MPC · JPL
66305	1999 JD_{38}	—	May 10, 1999	Socorro	LINEAR	·	4.0 km	MPC · JPL
66306	1999 JG_{39}	—	May 10, 1999	Socorro	LINEAR	·	2.2 km	MPC · JPL
66307	1999 JV_{40}	—	May 10, 1999	Socorro	LINEAR	·	3.6 km	MPC · JPL
66308	1999 JX_{40}	—	May 10, 1999	Socorro	LINEAR	·	2.9 km	MPC · JPL
66309	1999 JX_{41}	—	May 10, 1999	Socorro	LINEAR	ERI	3.4 km	MPC · JPL
66310	1999 JZ_{41}	—	May 10, 1999	Socorro	LINEAR	·	1.9 km	MPC · JPL
66311	1999 JE_{42}	—	May 10, 1999	Socorro	LINEAR	·	2.4 km	MPC · JPL
66312	1999 JJ_{43}	—	May 10, 1999	Socorro	LINEAR	·	3.0 km	MPC · JPL
66313	1999 JQ_{43}	—	May 10, 1999	Socorro	LINEAR	V	2.5 km	MPC · JPL
66314	1999 JQ_{45}	—	May 10, 1999	Socorro	LINEAR	NYS ·	4.2 km	MPC · JPL
66315	1999 JB_{48}	—	May 10, 1999	Socorro	LINEAR	·	3.0 km	MPC · JPL
66316	1999 JR_{49}	—	May 10, 1999	Socorro	LINEAR	·	6.7 km	MPC · JPL
66317	1999 JL_{50}	—	May 10, 1999	Socorro	LINEAR	slow	2.2 km	MPC · JPL
66318	1999 JC_{51}	—	May 10, 1999	Socorro	LINEAR	·	3.6 km	MPC · JPL
66319	1999 JQ_{51}	—	May 10, 1999	Socorro	LINEAR	V	2.1 km	MPC · JPL
66320	1999 JT_{51}	—	May 10, 1999	Socorro	LINEAR	·	1.8 km	MPC · JPL
66321	1999 JW_{51}	—	May 10, 1999	Socorro	LINEAR	NYS	1.7 km	MPC · JPL
66322	1999 JV_{52}	—	May 10, 1999	Socorro	LINEAR	·	2.6 km	MPC · JPL
66323	1999 JH_{53}	—	May 10, 1999	Socorro	LINEAR	·	3.6 km	MPC · JPL
66324	1999 JC_{55}	—	May 10, 1999	Socorro	LINEAR	·	3.1 km	MPC · JPL
66325	1999 JF_{55}	—	May 10, 1999	Socorro	LINEAR	ERI	5.1 km	MPC · JPL
66326	1999 JR_{55}	—	May 10, 1999	Socorro	LINEAR	·	2.2 km	MPC · JPL
66327	1999 JY_{56}	—	May 10, 1999	Socorro	LINEAR	·	1.4 km	MPC · JPL
66328	1999 JK_{58}	—	May 10, 1999	Socorro	LINEAR	·	2.0 km	MPC · JPL
66329	1999 JP_{58}	—	May 10, 1999	Socorro	LINEAR	·	2.3 km	MPC · JPL
66330	1999 JS_{59}	—	May 10, 1999	Socorro	LINEAR	·	2.5 km	MPC · JPL
66331	1999 JY_{59}	—	May 10, 1999	Socorro	LINEAR	NYS	2.6 km	MPC · JPL
66332	1999 JE_{60}	—	May 10, 1999	Socorro	LINEAR	·	2.3 km	MPC · JPL
66333	1999 JS_{60}	—	May 10, 1999	Socorro	LINEAR	NYS ·	4.7 km	MPC · JPL
66334	1999 JC_{61}	—	May 10, 1999	Socorro	LINEAR	V	2.2 km	MPC · JPL
66335	1999 JZ_{61}	—	May 10, 1999	Socorro	LINEAR	·	3.4 km	MPC · JPL
66336	1999 JB_{62}	—	May 10, 1999	Socorro	LINEAR	·	5.8 km	MPC · JPL
66337	1999 JP_{63}	—	May 10, 1999	Socorro	LINEAR	·	2.2 km	MPC · JPL
66338	1999 JV_{63}	—	May 10, 1999	Socorro	LINEAR	·	2.5 km	MPC · JPL
66339	1999 JW_{64}	—	May 10, 1999	Socorro	LINEAR	·	2.8 km	MPC · JPL
66340	1999 JX_{65}	—	May 12, 1999	Socorro	LINEAR	·	2.5 km	MPC · JPL
66341	1999 JK_{66}	—	May 12, 1999	Socorro	LINEAR	·	2.6 km	MPC · JPL
66342	1999 JA_{68}	—	May 12, 1999	Socorro	LINEAR	·	2.4 km	MPC · JPL
66343	1999 JV_{68}	—	May 12, 1999	Socorro	LINEAR	NYS	2.3 km	MPC · JPL
66344	1999 JS_{70}	—	May 12, 1999	Socorro	LINEAR	V	1.9 km	MPC · JPL
66345	1999 JK_{71}	—	May 12, 1999	Socorro	LINEAR	·	1.7 km	MPC · JPL
66346	1999 JU_{71}	—	May 12, 1999	Socorro	LINEAR	·	2.4 km	MPC · JPL
66347	1999 JW_{72}	—	May 12, 1999	Socorro	LINEAR	V	1.9 km	MPC · JPL
66348	1999 JC_{73}	—	May 12, 1999	Socorro	LINEAR	·	2.8 km	MPC · JPL
66349	1999 JF_{75}	—	May 13, 1999	Socorro	LINEAR	·	1.9 km	MPC · JPL
66350	1999 JS_{76}	—	May 10, 1999	Socorro	LINEAR	·	3.0 km	MPC · JPL
66351	1999 JU_{77}	—	May 12, 1999	Socorro	LINEAR	·	1.8 km	MPC · JPL
66352	1999 JS_{78}	—	May 13, 1999	Socorro	LINEAR	·	2.6 km	MPC · JPL
66353	1999 JP_{79}	—	May 13, 1999	Socorro	LINEAR	NYS	2.7 km	MPC · JPL
66354	1999 JM_{83}	—	May 12, 1999	Socorro	LINEAR	PHO	3.6 km	MPC · JPL
66355	1999 JN_{85}	—	May 15, 1999	Socorro	LINEAR	·	2.2 km	MPC · JPL
66356	1999 JG_{87}	—	May 12, 1999	Socorro	LINEAR	·	4.6 km	MPC · JPL
66357	1999 JN_{87}	—	May 12, 1999	Socorro	LINEAR	·	1.6 km	MPC · JPL
66358	1999 JW_{87}	—	May 12, 1999	Socorro	LINEAR	·	2.6 km	MPC · JPL
66359	1999 JP_{88}	—	May 12, 1999	Socorro	LINEAR	·	1.7 km	MPC · JPL
66360	1999 JQ_{89}	—	May 12, 1999	Socorro	LINEAR	T_{j} (2.99)	8.6 km	MPC · JPL
66361	1999 JH_{90}	—	May 12, 1999	Socorro	LINEAR	·	2.4 km	MPC · JPL
66362	1999 JQ_{90}	—	May 12, 1999	Socorro	LINEAR	·	3.4 km	MPC · JPL
66363	1999 JX_{91}	—	May 12, 1999	Socorro	LINEAR	·	1.9 km	MPC · JPL
66364	1999 JH_{92}	—	May 12, 1999	Socorro	LINEAR	HNS	2.9 km	MPC · JPL
66365	1999 JV_{92}	—	May 12, 1999	Socorro	LINEAR	·	1.6 km	MPC · JPL
66366	1999 JS_{95}	—	May 12, 1999	Socorro	LINEAR	·	1.8 km	MPC · JPL
66367	1999 JW_{95}	—	May 12, 1999	Socorro	LINEAR	·	3.8 km	MPC · JPL
66368	1999 JP_{98}	—	May 12, 1999	Socorro	LINEAR	·	4.2 km	MPC · JPL
66369	1999 JA_{103}	—	May 13, 1999	Socorro	LINEAR	·	2.0 km	MPC · JPL
66370	1999 JJ_{113}	—	May 13, 1999	Socorro	LINEAR	NYS ·	4.2 km	MPC · JPL
66371	1999 JT_{113}	—	May 13, 1999	Socorro	LINEAR	NYS	2.5 km	MPC · JPL
66372	1999 JV_{114}	—	May 13, 1999	Socorro	LINEAR	·	2.0 km	MPC · JPL
66373	1999 JW_{114}	—	May 13, 1999	Socorro	LINEAR	V	2.2 km	MPC · JPL
66374	1999 JO_{120}	—	May 13, 1999	Socorro	LINEAR	·	1.8 km	MPC · JPL
66375	1999 JF_{121}	—	May 13, 1999	Socorro	LINEAR	·	2.5 km	MPC · JPL
66376	1999 JH_{122}	—	May 13, 1999	Socorro	LINEAR	·	2.8 km	MPC · JPL
66377	1999 JJ_{122}	—	May 13, 1999	Socorro	LINEAR	·	2.1 km	MPC · JPL
66378	1999 JL_{122}	—	May 13, 1999	Socorro	LINEAR	·	2.5 km	MPC · JPL
66379	1999 JZ_{123}	—	May 14, 1999	Socorro	LINEAR	·	4.1 km	MPC · JPL
66380	1999 JV_{124}	—	May 10, 1999	Socorro	LINEAR	·	2.3 km	MPC · JPL
66381	1999 JZ_{126}	—	May 13, 1999	Socorro	LINEAR	·	1.6 km	MPC · JPL
66382	1999 JC_{127}	—	May 13, 1999	Socorro	LINEAR	·	1.5 km	MPC · JPL
66383	1999 JK_{130}	—	May 13, 1999	Socorro	LINEAR	·	1.9 km	MPC · JPL
66384	1999 JO_{131}	—	May 13, 1999	Socorro	LINEAR	NYS	2.8 km	MPC · JPL
66385	1999 JY_{131}	—	May 13, 1999	Socorro	LINEAR	NYS	1.3 km	MPC · JPL
66386	1999 JJ_{134}	—	May 15, 1999	Catalina	CSS	·	1.6 km	MPC · JPL
66387	1999 JE_{136}	—	May 7, 1999	Anderson Mesa	LONEOS	·	1.3 km	MPC · JPL
66388	1999 KF_{1}	—	May 18, 1999	Socorro	LINEAR	·	2.9 km	MPC · JPL
66389	1999 KP_{1}	—	May 16, 1999	Kitt Peak	Spacewatch	·	3.8 km	MPC · JPL
66390	1999 KL_{3}	—	May 17, 1999	Kitt Peak	Spacewatch	VER	9.3 km	MPC · JPL
66391 Moshup	1999 KW_{4}	Moshup	May 20, 1999	Socorro	LINEAR	ATE +1km · PHA · moon	1.3 km	MPC · JPL
66392	1999 KF_{10}	—	May 18, 1999	Socorro	LINEAR	·	2.7 km	MPC · JPL
66393	1999 KU_{10}	—	May 18, 1999	Socorro	LINEAR	V	1.6 km	MPC · JPL
66394	1999 KP_{11}	—	May 18, 1999	Socorro	LINEAR	NYS	2.2 km	MPC · JPL
66395	1999 KS_{12}	—	May 18, 1999	Socorro	LINEAR	·	1.7 km	MPC · JPL
66396	1999 KQ_{13}	—	May 18, 1999	Socorro	LINEAR	·	4.4 km	MPC · JPL
66397	1999 KP_{14}	—	May 18, 1999	Socorro	LINEAR	·	1.5 km	MPC · JPL
66398	1999 KS_{14}	—	May 18, 1999	Socorro	LINEAR	·	4.1 km	MPC · JPL
66399	1999 LH	—	June 5, 1999	Baton Rouge	W. R. Cooney Jr., Hess, M.	NYS	1.2 km	MPC · JPL
66400	1999 LT_{7}	—	June 9, 1999	Socorro	LINEAR	ATE	410 m	MPC · JPL

== 66401–66500 ==
back to top

Designation			Discovery			Properties		Ref
Permanent	Provisional	Named after	Date	Site	Discoverer(s)	Category	Diam.	Ref
66401	1999 LJ_{11}	—	June 8, 1999	Socorro	LINEAR	·	3.0 km	MPC · JPL
66402	1999 LY_{12}	—	June 9, 1999	Socorro	LINEAR	·	2.4 km	MPC · JPL
66403	1999 LM_{13}	—	June 9, 1999	Socorro	LINEAR	ERI	4.0 km	MPC · JPL
66404	1999 LK_{20}	—	June 9, 1999	Socorro	LINEAR	NYS	1.3 km	MPC · JPL
66405	1999 LZ_{20}	—	June 9, 1999	Socorro	LINEAR	·	2.1 km	MPC · JPL
66406	1999 LA_{22}	—	June 9, 1999	Socorro	LINEAR	·	2.8 km	MPC · JPL
66407	1999 LQ_{28}	—	June 14, 1999	Socorro	LINEAR	AMO	610 m	MPC · JPL
66408	1999 LA_{35}	—	June 14, 1999	Socorro	LINEAR	·	2.8 km	MPC · JPL
66409	1999 MK_{1}	—	June 20, 1999	Anderson Mesa	LONEOS	MAR	3.7 km	MPC · JPL
66410	1999 NS_{6}	—	July 13, 1999	Socorro	LINEAR	·	1.8 km	MPC · JPL
66411	1999 NB_{7}	—	July 13, 1999	Socorro	LINEAR	EUN	4.3 km	MPC · JPL
66412	1999 NW_{7}	—	July 13, 1999	Socorro	LINEAR	·	2.6 km	MPC · JPL
66413	1999 NX_{7}	—	July 13, 1999	Socorro	LINEAR	EUN	3.0 km	MPC · JPL
66414	1999 NC_{8}	—	July 13, 1999	Socorro	LINEAR	·	4.7 km	MPC · JPL
66415	1999 NG_{8}	—	July 13, 1999	Socorro	LINEAR	MAS	1.9 km	MPC · JPL
66416	1999 NR_{9}	—	July 13, 1999	Socorro	LINEAR	·	4.9 km	MPC · JPL
66417	1999 NC_{10}	—	July 13, 1999	Socorro	LINEAR	·	2.9 km	MPC · JPL
66418	1999 NN_{10}	—	July 13, 1999	Socorro	LINEAR	·	6.6 km	MPC · JPL
66419	1999 NR_{13}	—	July 14, 1999	Socorro	LINEAR	·	5.6 km	MPC · JPL
66420	1999 NA_{15}	—	July 14, 1999	Socorro	LINEAR	·	1.5 km	MPC · JPL
66421	1999 NQ_{19}	—	July 14, 1999	Socorro	LINEAR	SUL	5.4 km	MPC · JPL
66422	1999 NN_{23}	—	July 14, 1999	Socorro	LINEAR	MAS	1.7 km	MPC · JPL
66423	1999 NV_{26}	—	July 14, 1999	Socorro	LINEAR	ERI	3.6 km	MPC · JPL
66424	1999 NA_{27}	—	July 14, 1999	Socorro	LINEAR	·	2.3 km	MPC · JPL
66425	1999 NS_{32}	—	July 14, 1999	Socorro	LINEAR	·	2.2 km	MPC · JPL
66426	1999 NW_{33}	—	July 14, 1999	Socorro	LINEAR	·	2.6 km	MPC · JPL
66427	1999 NP_{34}	—	July 14, 1999	Socorro	LINEAR	·	1.8 km	MPC · JPL
66428	1999 NB_{36}	—	July 14, 1999	Socorro	LINEAR	MAS	1.8 km	MPC · JPL
66429	1999 NQ_{38}	—	July 14, 1999	Socorro	LINEAR	·	2.7 km	MPC · JPL
66430	1999 NX_{41}	—	July 14, 1999	Socorro	LINEAR	·	2.8 km	MPC · JPL
66431	1999 NX_{45}	—	July 13, 1999	Socorro	LINEAR	·	2.4 km	MPC · JPL
66432	1999 NL_{46}	—	July 13, 1999	Socorro	LINEAR	·	6.8 km	MPC · JPL
66433	1999 NF_{49}	—	July 13, 1999	Socorro	LINEAR	·	4.5 km	MPC · JPL
66434	1999 NX_{49}	—	July 13, 1999	Socorro	LINEAR	·	2.9 km	MPC · JPL
66435	1999 NT_{50}	—	July 14, 1999	Socorro	LINEAR	NYS	2.1 km	MPC · JPL
66436	1999 NT_{52}	—	July 12, 1999	Socorro	LINEAR	·	3.0 km	MPC · JPL
66437	1999 NK_{54}	—	July 12, 1999	Socorro	LINEAR	·	3.8 km	MPC · JPL
66438	1999 NN_{54}	—	July 12, 1999	Socorro	LINEAR	·	3.9 km	MPC · JPL
66439	1999 NG_{55}	—	July 12, 1999	Socorro	LINEAR	MAR	4.4 km	MPC · JPL
66440	1999 NF_{56}	—	July 12, 1999	Socorro	LINEAR	·	4.5 km	MPC · JPL
66441	1999 NX_{56}	—	July 12, 1999	Socorro	LINEAR	·	3.2 km	MPC · JPL
66442	1999 NZ_{56}	—	July 12, 1999	Socorro	LINEAR	·	4.9 km	MPC · JPL
66443	1999 NW_{57}	—	July 13, 1999	Socorro	LINEAR	·	3.3 km	MPC · JPL
66444	1999 NS_{59}	—	July 13, 1999	Socorro	LINEAR	ADE	7.6 km	MPC · JPL
66445	1999 NV_{59}	—	July 13, 1999	Socorro	LINEAR	·	4.0 km	MPC · JPL
66446	1999 NF_{61}	—	July 13, 1999	Socorro	LINEAR	EUN	3.3 km	MPC · JPL
66447	1999 NG_{65}	—	July 13, 1999	Socorro	LINEAR	V	1.7 km	MPC · JPL
66448	1999 OY_{1}	—	July 22, 1999	Socorro	LINEAR	·	4.9 km	MPC · JPL
66449	1999 OZ_{1}	—	July 22, 1999	Socorro	LINEAR	·	3.9 km	MPC · JPL
66450	1999 OH_{2}	—	July 22, 1999	Socorro	LINEAR	MAR	3.6 km	MPC · JPL
66451	1999 OS_{2}	—	July 22, 1999	Socorro	LINEAR	EUN	3.8 km	MPC · JPL
66452	1999 OF_{4}	—	July 21, 1999	Mauna Kea	Mauna Kea	cubewano (cold)	148 km	MPC · JPL
66453	1999 PC	—	August 3, 1999	Prescott	P. G. Comba	·	5.9 km	MPC · JPL
66454 Terezabeatriz	1999 PM	Terezabeatriz	August 3, 1999	Wykrota	C. Jacques, Duczmal, L.	·	2.2 km	MPC · JPL
66455	1999 PV_{2}	—	August 7, 1999	Kitt Peak	Spacewatch	·	5.2 km	MPC · JPL
66456	1999 PS_{5}	—	August 12, 1999	Kitt Peak	Spacewatch	·	3.2 km	MPC · JPL
66457	1999 PY_{7}	—	August 7, 1999	Anderson Mesa	LONEOS	·	1.8 km	MPC · JPL
66458 Romaplanetario	1999 QV_{1}	Romaplanetario	August 22, 1999	Ceccano	G. Masi	·	2.6 km	MPC · JPL
66459	1999 RD_{4}	—	September 4, 1999	Catalina	CSS	GEF	2.8 km	MPC · JPL
66460	1999 RX_{8}	—	September 4, 1999	Kitt Peak	Spacewatch	·	4.4 km	MPC · JPL
66461	1999 RQ_{11}	—	September 7, 1999	Socorro	LINEAR	·	2.5 km	MPC · JPL
66462	1999 RS_{11}	—	September 7, 1999	Socorro	LINEAR	V	3.2 km	MPC · JPL
66463	1999 RS_{12}	—	September 7, 1999	Socorro	LINEAR	·	3.2 km	MPC · JPL
66464	1999 RS_{14}	—	September 7, 1999	Socorro	LINEAR	·	2.8 km	MPC · JPL
66465	1999 RJ_{15}	—	September 7, 1999	Socorro	LINEAR	(5)	3.5 km	MPC · JPL
66466	1999 RK_{16}	—	September 7, 1999	Socorro	LINEAR	·	2.6 km	MPC · JPL
66467	1999 RT_{16}	—	September 7, 1999	Socorro	LINEAR	·	3.0 km	MPC · JPL
66468	1999 RL_{17}	—	September 7, 1999	Socorro	LINEAR	·	3.8 km	MPC · JPL
66469	1999 RL_{18}	—	September 7, 1999	Socorro	LINEAR	MAR	3.4 km	MPC · JPL
66470	1999 RP_{18}	—	September 7, 1999	Socorro	LINEAR	JUN	2.2 km	MPC · JPL
66471	1999 RV_{19}	—	September 7, 1999	Socorro	LINEAR	·	4.6 km	MPC · JPL
66472	1999 RM_{24}	—	September 7, 1999	Socorro	LINEAR	·	3.3 km	MPC · JPL
66473	1999 RZ_{24}	—	September 7, 1999	Socorro	LINEAR	·	6.3 km	MPC · JPL
66474	1999 RC_{25}	—	September 7, 1999	Socorro	LINEAR	EUN	2.7 km	MPC · JPL
66475	1999 RH_{26}	—	September 7, 1999	Socorro	LINEAR	MAR	3.8 km	MPC · JPL
66476	1999 RM_{26}	—	September 7, 1999	Socorro	LINEAR	AGN	3.2 km	MPC · JPL
66477	1999 RW_{26}	—	September 7, 1999	Socorro	LINEAR	·	3.0 km	MPC · JPL
66478	1999 RB_{27}	—	September 7, 1999	Socorro	LINEAR	·	2.9 km	MPC · JPL
66479 Healy	1999 RQ_{33}	Healy	September 4, 1999	OCA-Anza	M. Collins, White, M.	·	5.6 km	MPC · JPL
66480 Riese	1999 RW_{33}	Riese	September 10, 1999	Starkenburg Observatory	Starkenburg	ADE	5.5 km	MPC · JPL
66481	1999 RZ_{34}	—	September 11, 1999	Višnjan Observatory	K. Korlević	PHO	5.2 km	MPC · JPL
66482	1999 RW_{37}	—	September 12, 1999	Višnjan Observatory	K. Korlević	EUN	3.4 km	MPC · JPL
66483	1999 RZ_{38}	—	September 13, 1999	Reedy Creek	J. Broughton	·	4.2 km	MPC · JPL
66484	1999 RR_{39}	—	September 7, 1999	Catalina	CSS	·	2.4 km	MPC · JPL
66485	1999 RX_{41}	—	September 13, 1999	Višnjan Observatory	K. Korlević	MAR	4.7 km	MPC · JPL
66486	1999 RF_{42}	—	September 14, 1999	Ondřejov	P. Kušnirák, P. Pravec	·	4.0 km	MPC · JPL
66487	1999 RL_{42}	—	September 13, 1999	Višnjan Observatory	K. Korlević	·	8.1 km	MPC · JPL
66488	1999 RD_{44}	—	September 15, 1999	Calgary	Billings, G. W.	MAR	3.6 km	MPC · JPL
66489	1999 RS_{44}	—	September 15, 1999	Višnjan Observatory	K. Korlević	·	2.8 km	MPC · JPL
66490	1999 RS_{49}	—	September 7, 1999	Socorro	LINEAR	·	3.2 km	MPC · JPL
66491	1999 RG_{54}	—	September 7, 1999	Socorro	LINEAR	·	2.8 km	MPC · JPL
66492	1999 RZ_{54}	—	September 7, 1999	Socorro	LINEAR	·	6.3 km	MPC · JPL
66493	1999 RV_{56}	—	September 7, 1999	Socorro	LINEAR	·	2.6 km	MPC · JPL
66494	1999 RM_{57}	—	September 7, 1999	Socorro	LINEAR	GEF	2.6 km	MPC · JPL
66495	1999 RD_{62}	—	September 7, 1999	Socorro	LINEAR	·	3.1 km	MPC · JPL
66496	1999 RZ_{64}	—	September 7, 1999	Socorro	LINEAR	·	3.2 km	MPC · JPL
66497	1999 RK_{66}	—	September 7, 1999	Socorro	LINEAR	·	2.9 km	MPC · JPL
66498	1999 RR_{67}	—	September 7, 1999	Socorro	LINEAR	·	3.0 km	MPC · JPL
66499	1999 RR_{71}	—	September 7, 1999	Socorro	LINEAR	·	2.9 km	MPC · JPL
66500	1999 RK_{73}	—	September 7, 1999	Socorro	LINEAR	·	2.5 km	MPC · JPL

== 66501–66600 ==
back to top

Designation			Discovery			Properties		Ref
Permanent	Provisional	Named after	Date	Site	Discoverer(s)	Category	Diam.	Ref
66501	1999 RS_{75}	—	September 7, 1999	Socorro	LINEAR	(5)	3.4 km	MPC · JPL
66502	1999 RV_{75}	—	September 7, 1999	Socorro	LINEAR	·	3.6 km	MPC · JPL
66503	1999 RE_{81}	—	September 7, 1999	Socorro	LINEAR	·	2.8 km	MPC · JPL
66504	1999 RN_{81}	—	September 7, 1999	Socorro	LINEAR	(5)	2.4 km	MPC · JPL
66505	1999 RH_{83}	—	September 7, 1999	Socorro	LINEAR	EUN	2.4 km	MPC · JPL
66506	1999 RM_{84}	—	September 7, 1999	Socorro	LINEAR	·	3.3 km	MPC · JPL
66507	1999 RT_{84}	—	September 7, 1999	Socorro	LINEAR	·	3.5 km	MPC · JPL
66508	1999 RS_{86}	—	September 7, 1999	Socorro	LINEAR	(5)	3.0 km	MPC · JPL
66509	1999 RK_{89}	—	September 7, 1999	Socorro	LINEAR	·	4.1 km	MPC · JPL
66510	1999 RU_{90}	—	September 7, 1999	Socorro	LINEAR	EUN	5.4 km	MPC · JPL
66511	1999 RW_{91}	—	September 7, 1999	Socorro	LINEAR	·	1.8 km	MPC · JPL
66512	1999 RC_{92}	—	September 7, 1999	Socorro	LINEAR	·	2.9 km	MPC · JPL
66513	1999 RE_{94}	—	September 7, 1999	Socorro	LINEAR	·	2.8 km	MPC · JPL
66514	1999 RS_{94}	—	September 7, 1999	Socorro	LINEAR	·	5.1 km	MPC · JPL
66515	1999 RD_{97}	—	September 7, 1999	Socorro	LINEAR	·	2.2 km	MPC · JPL
66516	1999 RM_{97}	—	September 7, 1999	Socorro	LINEAR	·	2.3 km	MPC · JPL
66517	1999 RM_{98}	—	September 7, 1999	Socorro	LINEAR	·	2.7 km	MPC · JPL
66518	1999 RK_{99}	—	September 8, 1999	Socorro	LINEAR	·	1.8 km	MPC · JPL
66519	1999 RZ_{99}	—	September 8, 1999	Socorro	LINEAR	·	4.3 km	MPC · JPL
66520	1999 RQ_{101}	—	September 8, 1999	Socorro	LINEAR	ADE	5.9 km	MPC · JPL
66521	1999 RR_{101}	—	September 8, 1999	Socorro	LINEAR	·	4.0 km	MPC · JPL
66522	1999 RG_{102}	—	September 8, 1999	Socorro	LINEAR	EUN	6.0 km	MPC · JPL
66523	1999 RN_{102}	—	September 8, 1999	Socorro	LINEAR	·	5.0 km	MPC · JPL
66524	1999 RQ_{102}	—	September 8, 1999	Socorro	LINEAR	·	3.5 km	MPC · JPL
66525	1999 RH_{103}	—	September 8, 1999	Socorro	LINEAR	PHO	2.5 km	MPC · JPL
66526	1999 RX_{103}	—	September 8, 1999	Socorro	LINEAR	·	3.5 km	MPC · JPL
66527	1999 RD_{104}	—	September 8, 1999	Socorro	LINEAR	·	4.0 km	MPC · JPL
66528	1999 RV_{105}	—	September 8, 1999	Socorro	LINEAR	·	3.6 km	MPC · JPL
66529	1999 RX_{107}	—	September 8, 1999	Socorro	LINEAR	·	5.3 km	MPC · JPL
66530	1999 RJ_{108}	—	September 8, 1999	Socorro	LINEAR	EUN	3.2 km	MPC · JPL
66531	1999 RX_{108}	—	September 8, 1999	Socorro	LINEAR	·	4.4 km	MPC · JPL
66532	1999 RZ_{110}	—	September 8, 1999	Socorro	LINEAR	·	3.9 km	MPC · JPL
66533	1999 RN_{111}	—	September 9, 1999	Socorro	LINEAR	PHO	2.6 km	MPC · JPL
66534	1999 RA_{112}	—	September 9, 1999	Socorro	LINEAR	V	1.9 km	MPC · JPL
66535	1999 RF_{112}	—	September 9, 1999	Socorro	LINEAR	·	3.8 km	MPC · JPL
66536	1999 RD_{113}	—	September 9, 1999	Socorro	LINEAR	·	2.9 km	MPC · JPL
66537	1999 RU_{115}	—	September 9, 1999	Socorro	LINEAR	·	2.6 km	MPC · JPL
66538	1999 RV_{117}	—	September 9, 1999	Socorro	LINEAR	·	3.6 km	MPC · JPL
66539	1999 RX_{117}	—	September 9, 1999	Socorro	LINEAR	·	3.7 km	MPC · JPL
66540	1999 RM_{118}	—	September 9, 1999	Socorro	LINEAR	·	3.6 km	MPC · JPL
66541	1999 RP_{118}	—	September 9, 1999	Socorro	LINEAR	·	5.5 km	MPC · JPL
66542	1999 RT_{118}	—	September 9, 1999	Socorro	LINEAR	EUN	3.3 km	MPC · JPL
66543	1999 RJ_{119}	—	September 9, 1999	Socorro	LINEAR	·	3.1 km	MPC · JPL
66544	1999 RR_{119}	—	September 9, 1999	Socorro	LINEAR	·	2.6 km	MPC · JPL
66545	1999 RJ_{120}	—	September 9, 1999	Socorro	LINEAR	·	2.3 km	MPC · JPL
66546	1999 RG_{122}	—	September 9, 1999	Socorro	LINEAR	PHO	3.8 km	MPC · JPL
66547	1999 RG_{124}	—	September 9, 1999	Socorro	LINEAR	·	6.5 km	MPC · JPL
66548	1999 RL_{124}	—	September 9, 1999	Socorro	LINEAR	EUN	4.5 km	MPC · JPL
66549	1999 RS_{124}	—	September 9, 1999	Socorro	LINEAR	RAF	2.2 km	MPC · JPL
66550	1999 RU_{124}	—	September 9, 1999	Socorro	LINEAR	(5)	3.0 km	MPC · JPL
66551	1999 RC_{128}	—	September 9, 1999	Socorro	LINEAR	·	3.9 km	MPC · JPL
66552	1999 RQ_{130}	—	September 9, 1999	Socorro	LINEAR	V	2.6 km	MPC · JPL
66553	1999 RV_{130}	—	September 9, 1999	Socorro	LINEAR	RAF	2.5 km	MPC · JPL
66554	1999 RT_{131}	—	September 9, 1999	Socorro	LINEAR	·	4.6 km	MPC · JPL
66555	1999 RQ_{132}	—	September 9, 1999	Socorro	LINEAR	·	3.9 km	MPC · JPL
66556	1999 RB_{133}	—	September 9, 1999	Socorro	LINEAR	·	3.7 km	MPC · JPL
66557	1999 RN_{133}	—	September 9, 1999	Socorro	LINEAR	EUN	3.1 km	MPC · JPL
66558	1999 RX_{134}	—	September 9, 1999	Socorro	LINEAR	·	2.8 km	MPC · JPL
66559	1999 RB_{135}	—	September 9, 1999	Socorro	LINEAR	·	6.7 km	MPC · JPL
66560	1999 RR_{135}	—	September 9, 1999	Socorro	LINEAR	MAS	3.3 km	MPC · JPL
66561	1999 RW_{135}	—	September 9, 1999	Socorro	LINEAR	·	3.2 km	MPC · JPL
66562	1999 RO_{136}	—	September 9, 1999	Socorro	LINEAR	fast	2.5 km	MPC · JPL
66563	1999 RV_{136}	—	September 9, 1999	Socorro	LINEAR	·	1.7 km	MPC · JPL
66564	1999 RU_{137}	—	September 9, 1999	Socorro	LINEAR	·	3.4 km	MPC · JPL
66565	1999 RC_{138}	—	September 9, 1999	Socorro	LINEAR	·	2.3 km	MPC · JPL
66566	1999 RL_{139}	—	September 9, 1999	Socorro	LINEAR	·	3.1 km	MPC · JPL
66567	1999 RV_{140}	—	September 9, 1999	Socorro	LINEAR	·	3.1 km	MPC · JPL
66568	1999 RQ_{142}	—	September 9, 1999	Socorro	LINEAR	·	5.4 km	MPC · JPL
66569	1999 RM_{145}	—	September 9, 1999	Socorro	LINEAR	EUN	2.5 km	MPC · JPL
66570	1999 RW_{145}	—	September 9, 1999	Socorro	LINEAR	·	2.6 km	MPC · JPL
66571	1999 RP_{147}	—	September 9, 1999	Socorro	LINEAR	·	2.1 km	MPC · JPL
66572	1999 RU_{149}	—	September 9, 1999	Socorro	LINEAR	·	2.1 km	MPC · JPL
66573	1999 RL_{152}	—	September 14, 1999	Socorro	LINEAR	EUN	2.6 km	MPC · JPL
66574	1999 RR_{152}	—	September 9, 1999	Socorro	LINEAR	·	4.1 km	MPC · JPL
66575	1999 RX_{152}	—	September 9, 1999	Socorro	LINEAR	·	5.4 km	MPC · JPL
66576	1999 RY_{152}	—	September 9, 1999	Socorro	LINEAR	·	2.2 km	MPC · JPL
66577	1999 RD_{153}	—	September 9, 1999	Socorro	LINEAR	EUN	3.1 km	MPC · JPL
66578	1999 RS_{153}	—	September 9, 1999	Socorro	LINEAR	·	4.3 km	MPC · JPL
66579	1999 RK_{154}	—	September 9, 1999	Socorro	LINEAR	·	3.6 km	MPC · JPL
66580	1999 RE_{155}	—	September 9, 1999	Socorro	LINEAR	·	3.3 km	MPC · JPL
66581	1999 RF_{155}	—	September 9, 1999	Socorro	LINEAR	·	2.6 km	MPC · JPL
66582	1999 RZ_{155}	—	September 9, 1999	Socorro	LINEAR	(5)	2.3 km	MPC · JPL
66583 Nicandra	1999 RL_{156}	Nicandra	September 9, 1999	Socorro	LINEAR	·	6.0 km	MPC · JPL
66584	1999 RM_{161}	—	September 9, 1999	Socorro	LINEAR	MAR	3.6 km	MPC · JPL
66585	1999 RC_{162}	—	September 9, 1999	Socorro	LINEAR	·	3.3 km	MPC · JPL
66586	1999 RC_{164}	—	September 9, 1999	Socorro	LINEAR	(5)	3.6 km	MPC · JPL
66587	1999 RB_{167}	—	September 9, 1999	Socorro	LINEAR	·	4.1 km	MPC · JPL
66588	1999 RX_{167}	—	September 9, 1999	Socorro	LINEAR	·	4.6 km	MPC · JPL
66589	1999 RE_{168}	—	September 9, 1999	Socorro	LINEAR	NYS	4.4 km	MPC · JPL
66590	1999 RD_{169}	—	September 9, 1999	Socorro	LINEAR	·	3.2 km	MPC · JPL
66591	1999 RY_{170}	—	September 9, 1999	Socorro	LINEAR	EOS	4.3 km	MPC · JPL
66592	1999 RU_{174}	—	September 9, 1999	Socorro	LINEAR	·	4.0 km	MPC · JPL
66593	1999 RL_{176}	—	September 9, 1999	Socorro	LINEAR	·	1.7 km	MPC · JPL
66594	1999 RO_{176}	—	September 9, 1999	Socorro	LINEAR	EUN	2.5 km	MPC · JPL
66595	1999 RU_{178}	—	September 9, 1999	Socorro	LINEAR	·	2.9 km	MPC · JPL
66596	1999 RO_{180}	—	September 9, 1999	Socorro	LINEAR	·	3.3 km	MPC · JPL
66597	1999 RA_{181}	—	September 9, 1999	Socorro	LINEAR	·	2.2 km	MPC · JPL
66598	1999 RF_{182}	—	September 9, 1999	Socorro	LINEAR	·	3.2 km	MPC · JPL
66599	1999 RM_{184}	—	September 9, 1999	Socorro	LINEAR	EUN	2.4 km	MPC · JPL
66600	1999 RQ_{184}	—	September 9, 1999	Socorro	LINEAR	·	3.8 km	MPC · JPL

== 66601–66700 ==
back to top

Designation			Discovery			Properties		Ref
Permanent	Provisional	Named after	Date	Site	Discoverer(s)	Category	Diam.	Ref
66601	1999 RH_{186}	—	September 9, 1999	Socorro	LINEAR	·	4.5 km	MPC · JPL
66602	1999 RH_{187}	—	September 9, 1999	Socorro	LINEAR	·	3.2 km	MPC · JPL
66603	1999 RB_{190}	—	September 9, 1999	Socorro	LINEAR	·	2.2 km	MPC · JPL
66604	1999 RB_{194}	—	September 7, 1999	Socorro	LINEAR	(5)	6.4 km	MPC · JPL
66605	1999 RF_{194}	—	September 7, 1999	Socorro	LINEAR	·	5.1 km	MPC · JPL
66606	1999 RK_{194}	—	September 7, 1999	Socorro	LINEAR	·	3.3 km	MPC · JPL
66607	1999 RG_{195}	—	September 8, 1999	Socorro	LINEAR	EUN	2.6 km	MPC · JPL
66608	1999 RW_{196}	—	September 8, 1999	Socorro	LINEAR	·	1.9 km	MPC · JPL
66609	1999 RW_{198}	—	September 10, 1999	Socorro	LINEAR	MAR	4.0 km	MPC · JPL
66610	1999 RX_{198}	—	September 10, 1999	Socorro	LINEAR	EUN	3.0 km	MPC · JPL
66611	1999 RZ_{198}	—	September 10, 1999	Socorro	LINEAR	·	4.8 km	MPC · JPL
66612	1999 RO_{199}	—	September 8, 1999	Socorro	LINEAR	·	4.2 km	MPC · JPL
66613	1999 RR_{199}	—	September 8, 1999	Socorro	LINEAR	·	3.3 km	MPC · JPL
66614	1999 RE_{200}	—	September 8, 1999	Socorro	LINEAR	·	4.8 km	MPC · JPL
66615	1999 RJ_{200}	—	September 8, 1999	Socorro	LINEAR	slow	9.0 km	MPC · JPL
66616	1999 RY_{200}	—	September 8, 1999	Socorro	LINEAR	·	5.0 km	MPC · JPL
66617	1999 RO_{201}	—	September 8, 1999	Socorro	LINEAR	·	4.4 km	MPC · JPL
66618	1999 RT_{201}	—	September 8, 1999	Socorro	LINEAR	·	3.4 km	MPC · JPL
66619	1999 RE_{203}	—	September 8, 1999	Socorro	LINEAR	EUN · slow	3.0 km	MPC · JPL
66620	1999 RZ_{203}	—	September 8, 1999	Socorro	LINEAR	·	5.2 km	MPC · JPL
66621	1999 RD_{204}	—	September 8, 1999	Socorro	LINEAR	EUN	3.8 km	MPC · JPL
66622	1999 RJ_{204}	—	September 8, 1999	Socorro	LINEAR	·	4.1 km	MPC · JPL
66623	1999 RL_{204}	—	September 8, 1999	Socorro	LINEAR	EUN	2.8 km	MPC · JPL
66624	1999 RM_{204}	—	September 8, 1999	Socorro	LINEAR	EUN	2.8 km	MPC · JPL
66625	1999 RE_{205}	—	September 8, 1999	Socorro	LINEAR	·	4.0 km	MPC · JPL
66626	1999 RJ_{205}	—	September 8, 1999	Socorro	LINEAR	·	4.3 km	MPC · JPL
66627	1999 RC_{208}	—	September 8, 1999	Socorro	LINEAR	MAR	3.1 km	MPC · JPL
66628	1999 RF_{208}	—	September 8, 1999	Socorro	LINEAR	·	3.7 km	MPC · JPL
66629	1999 RJ_{208}	—	September 8, 1999	Socorro	LINEAR	GEF	4.1 km	MPC · JPL
66630	1999 RS_{208}	—	September 8, 1999	Socorro	LINEAR	·	3.0 km	MPC · JPL
66631	1999 RP_{209}	—	September 8, 1999	Socorro	LINEAR	EUN	2.2 km	MPC · JPL
66632	1999 RT_{210}	—	September 8, 1999	Socorro	LINEAR	EUN	4.8 km	MPC · JPL
66633	1999 RB_{212}	—	September 8, 1999	Socorro	LINEAR	·	8.4 km	MPC · JPL
66634	1999 RJ_{212}	—	September 8, 1999	Socorro	LINEAR	·	3.7 km	MPC · JPL
66635	1999 RR_{212}	—	September 8, 1999	Socorro	LINEAR	BRA	5.0 km	MPC · JPL
66636	1999 RA_{213}	—	September 9, 1999	Socorro	LINEAR	EUN	3.3 km	MPC · JPL
66637	1999 RC_{213}	—	September 9, 1999	Socorro	LINEAR	·	5.7 km	MPC · JPL
66638	1999 RD_{218}	—	September 4, 1999	Catalina	CSS	·	4.6 km	MPC · JPL
66639	1999 RQ_{219}	—	September 4, 1999	Anderson Mesa	LONEOS	·	5.1 km	MPC · JPL
66640	1999 RG_{220}	—	September 4, 1999	Catalina	CSS	·	1.9 km	MPC · JPL
66641	1999 RQ_{225}	—	September 3, 1999	Kitt Peak	Spacewatch	·	3.4 km	MPC · JPL
66642	1999 RE_{226}	—	September 4, 1999	Catalina	CSS	ADE	5.2 km	MPC · JPL
66643	1999 RW_{229}	—	September 8, 1999	Catalina	CSS	·	6.6 km	MPC · JPL
66644	1999 RL_{231}	—	September 9, 1999	Anderson Mesa	LONEOS	·	6.2 km	MPC · JPL
66645	1999 RN_{232}	—	September 9, 1999	Anderson Mesa	LONEOS	·	7.0 km	MPC · JPL
66646	1999 RM_{237}	—	September 8, 1999	Catalina	CSS	ADE	7.0 km	MPC · JPL
66647	1999 RV_{237}	—	September 8, 1999	Socorro	LINEAR	·	2.8 km	MPC · JPL
66648	1999 RZ_{245}	—	September 7, 1999	Anderson Mesa	LONEOS	·	3.6 km	MPC · JPL
66649	1999 RE_{246}	—	September 7, 1999	Anderson Mesa	LONEOS	·	5.0 km	MPC · JPL
66650	1999 RN_{246}	—	September 7, 1999	Anderson Mesa	LONEOS	·	2.1 km	MPC · JPL
66651	1999 RQ_{252}	—	September 8, 1999	Socorro	LINEAR	·	8.1 km	MPC · JPL
66652 Borasisi	1999 RZ_{253}	Borasisi	September 8, 1999	Mauna Kea	C. A. Trujillo, J. X. Luu, D. C. Jewitt	cubewano (cold) · moon	126 km	MPC · JPL
66653	1999 RS_{254}	—	September 8, 1999	Catalina	CSS	·	4.7 km	MPC · JPL
66654	1999 SF_{12}	—	September 22, 1999	Socorro	LINEAR	HNS	4.8 km	MPC · JPL
66655	1999 SN_{13}	—	September 30, 1999	Kitt Peak	Spacewatch	DOR	6.1 km	MPC · JPL
66656	1999 SV_{17}	—	September 30, 1999	Socorro	LINEAR	fast	3.9 km	MPC · JPL
66657	1999 SM_{19}	—	September 30, 1999	Socorro	LINEAR	·	2.8 km	MPC · JPL
66658	1999 ST_{26}	—	September 30, 1999	Socorro	LINEAR	slow	3.6 km	MPC · JPL
66659	1999 TJ_{1}	—	October 1, 1999	Višnjan Observatory	K. Korlević	·	3.9 km	MPC · JPL
66660	1999 TH_{2}	—	October 2, 1999	Fountain Hills	C. W. Juels	·	4.4 km	MPC · JPL
66661 Wallin	1999 TK_{2}	Wallin	October 2, 1999	Jornada	Dixon, D. S.	·	7.6 km	MPC · JPL
66662	1999 TM_{4}	—	October 3, 1999	Socorro	LINEAR	·	7.1 km	MPC · JPL
66663	1999 TV_{8}	—	October 6, 1999	Višnjan Observatory	K. Korlević, M. Jurić	·	7.5 km	MPC · JPL
66664	1999 TB_{9}	—	October 7, 1999	Višnjan Observatory	K. Korlević, M. Jurić	·	4.1 km	MPC · JPL
66665	1999 TC_{9}	—	October 7, 1999	Višnjan Observatory	K. Korlević, M. Jurić	(5)	3.7 km	MPC · JPL
66666	1999 TL_{9}	—	October 7, 1999	Višnjan Observatory	K. Korlević, M. Jurić	·	3.8 km	MPC · JPL
66667 Kambič	1999 TZ_{11}	Kambič	October 8, 1999	Črni Vrh	Črni Vrh	·	1.9 km	MPC · JPL
66668	1999 TN_{14}	—	October 11, 1999	Višnjan Observatory	K. Korlević, M. Jurić	·	5.7 km	MPC · JPL
66669 Aradac	1999 TE_{15}	Aradac	October 12, 1999	Modra	A. Galád, P. Kolény	·	4.7 km	MPC · JPL
66670	1999 TR_{15}	—	October 12, 1999	Farra d'Isonzo	Farra d'Isonzo	·	3.3 km	MPC · JPL
66671 Sfasu	1999 TJ_{17}	Sfasu	October 15, 1999	Nacogdoches	Bruton, W. D., Johnson, M. L.	·	3.6 km	MPC · JPL
66672	1999 TB_{18}	—	October 10, 1999	Xinglong	SCAP	·	3.2 km	MPC · JPL
66673	1999 TC_{19}	—	October 15, 1999	Višnjan Observatory	K. Korlević	·	3.4 km	MPC · JPL
66674	1999 TO_{25}	—	October 3, 1999	Socorro	LINEAR	·	2.9 km	MPC · JPL
66675	1999 TF_{26}	—	October 3, 1999	Socorro	LINEAR	·	3.5 km	MPC · JPL
66676	1999 TS_{27}	—	October 3, 1999	Socorro	LINEAR	·	6.6 km	MPC · JPL
66677	1999 TM_{28}	—	October 4, 1999	Socorro	LINEAR	·	2.6 km	MPC · JPL
66678	1999 TR_{28}	—	October 4, 1999	Socorro	LINEAR	·	3.9 km	MPC · JPL
66679	1999 TD_{29}	—	October 4, 1999	Socorro	LINEAR	·	2.9 km	MPC · JPL
66680	1999 TG_{29}	—	October 4, 1999	Socorro	LINEAR	·	8.2 km	MPC · JPL
66681	1999 TN_{33}	—	October 4, 1999	Socorro	LINEAR	fast	2.3 km	MPC · JPL
66682	1999 TR_{35}	—	October 4, 1999	Socorro	LINEAR	PHO	3.9 km	MPC · JPL
66683	1999 TO_{36}	—	October 12, 1999	Anderson Mesa	LONEOS	EOS	5.5 km	MPC · JPL
66684	1999 TY_{36}	—	October 15, 1999	Anderson Mesa	LONEOS	HNS	3.2 km	MPC · JPL
66685	1999 TT_{37}	—	October 1, 1999	Catalina	CSS	·	3.2 km	MPC · JPL
66686	1999 TX_{37}	—	October 1, 1999	Catalina	CSS	·	3.8 km	MPC · JPL
66687	1999 TU_{45}	—	October 3, 1999	Kitt Peak	Spacewatch	·	3.6 km	MPC · JPL
66688	1999 TJ_{52}	—	October 4, 1999	Kitt Peak	Spacewatch	·	4.8 km	MPC · JPL
66689	1999 TU_{52}	—	October 6, 1999	Kitt Peak	Spacewatch	NYS	3.2 km	MPC · JPL
66690	1999 TH_{63}	—	October 7, 1999	Kitt Peak	Spacewatch	THM · fast	7.1 km	MPC · JPL
66691	1999 TE_{67}	—	October 8, 1999	Kitt Peak	Spacewatch	·	1.4 km	MPC · JPL
66692	1999 TL_{69}	—	October 9, 1999	Kitt Peak	Spacewatch	·	1.2 km	MPC · JPL
66693	1999 TB_{70}	—	October 9, 1999	Kitt Peak	Spacewatch	·	3.7 km	MPC · JPL
66694	1999 TF_{72}	—	October 9, 1999	Kitt Peak	Spacewatch	·	3.3 km	MPC · JPL
66695	1999 TZ_{72}	—	October 10, 1999	Kitt Peak	Spacewatch	·	1.9 km	MPC · JPL
66696	1999 TK_{75}	—	October 10, 1999	Kitt Peak	Spacewatch	KOR	2.8 km	MPC · JPL
66697	1999 TX_{80}	—	October 11, 1999	Kitt Peak	Spacewatch	·	1.5 km	MPC · JPL
66698	1999 TM_{82}	—	October 12, 1999	Kitt Peak	Spacewatch	AST	4.3 km	MPC · JPL
66699	1999 TB_{85}	—	October 14, 1999	Kitt Peak	Spacewatch	MAS	1.6 km	MPC · JPL
66700	1999 TC_{85}	—	October 14, 1999	Kitt Peak	Spacewatch	·	3.7 km	MPC · JPL

== 66701–66800 ==
back to top

Designation			Discovery			Properties		Ref
Permanent	Provisional	Named after	Date	Site	Discoverer(s)	Category	Diam.	Ref
66701	1999 TN_{86}	—	October 15, 1999	Kitt Peak	Spacewatch	NYS	2.5 km	MPC · JPL
66702	1999 TJ_{88}	—	October 2, 1999	Socorro	LINEAR	·	4.8 km	MPC · JPL
66703	1999 TL_{89}	—	October 2, 1999	Socorro	LINEAR	·	4.1 km	MPC · JPL
66704	1999 TU_{91}	—	October 2, 1999	Socorro	LINEAR	·	4.5 km	MPC · JPL
66705	1999 TM_{92}	—	October 2, 1999	Socorro	LINEAR	·	3.3 km	MPC · JPL
66706	1999 TY_{92}	—	October 2, 1999	Socorro	LINEAR	·	2.7 km	MPC · JPL
66707	1999 TG_{93}	—	October 2, 1999	Socorro	LINEAR	·	2.4 km	MPC · JPL
66708	1999 TY_{93}	—	October 2, 1999	Socorro	LINEAR	·	3.6 km	MPC · JPL
66709	1999 TS_{95}	—	October 2, 1999	Socorro	LINEAR	·	6.1 km	MPC · JPL
66710	1999 TT_{96}	—	October 2, 1999	Socorro	LINEAR	·	3.8 km	MPC · JPL
66711	1999 TQ_{99}	—	October 2, 1999	Socorro	LINEAR	·	3.3 km	MPC · JPL
66712	1999 TS_{99}	—	October 2, 1999	Socorro	LINEAR	PAD	3.5 km	MPC · JPL
66713	1999 TZ_{99}	—	October 2, 1999	Socorro	LINEAR	·	4.8 km	MPC · JPL
66714	1999 TT_{100}	—	October 2, 1999	Socorro	LINEAR	(14916)	6.1 km	MPC · JPL
66715	1999 TA_{101}	—	October 2, 1999	Socorro	LINEAR	EOS	6.7 km	MPC · JPL
66716	1999 TB_{102}	—	October 2, 1999	Socorro	LINEAR	·	3.3 km	MPC · JPL
66717	1999 TK_{102}	—	October 2, 1999	Socorro	LINEAR	·	4.9 km	MPC · JPL
66718	1999 TU_{104}	—	October 3, 1999	Socorro	LINEAR	AGN	2.6 km	MPC · JPL
66719	1999 TG_{105}	—	October 3, 1999	Socorro	LINEAR	·	10 km	MPC · JPL
66720	1999 TH_{105}	—	October 3, 1999	Socorro	LINEAR	·	1.6 km	MPC · JPL
66721	1999 TX_{106}	—	October 4, 1999	Socorro	LINEAR	·	3.9 km	MPC · JPL
66722	1999 TC_{107}	—	October 4, 1999	Socorro	LINEAR	·	3.5 km	MPC · JPL
66723	1999 TE_{107}	—	October 4, 1999	Socorro	LINEAR	EUN	4.1 km	MPC · JPL
66724	1999 TN_{107}	—	October 4, 1999	Socorro	LINEAR	·	2.6 km	MPC · JPL
66725	1999 TH_{109}	—	October 4, 1999	Socorro	LINEAR	EUN	3.2 km	MPC · JPL
66726	1999 TG_{110}	—	October 4, 1999	Socorro	LINEAR	·	4.1 km	MPC · JPL
66727	1999 TH_{110}	—	October 4, 1999	Socorro	LINEAR	PAD	6.7 km	MPC · JPL
66728	1999 TN_{110}	—	October 4, 1999	Socorro	LINEAR	·	3.4 km	MPC · JPL
66729	1999 TH_{111}	—	October 4, 1999	Socorro	LINEAR	MAR	3.3 km	MPC · JPL
66730	1999 TM_{111}	—	October 4, 1999	Socorro	LINEAR	·	4.2 km	MPC · JPL
66731	1999 TN_{111}	—	October 4, 1999	Socorro	LINEAR	EOS	5.1 km	MPC · JPL
66732	1999 TW_{111}	—	October 4, 1999	Socorro	LINEAR	·	5.2 km	MPC · JPL
66733	1999 TO_{113}	—	October 4, 1999	Socorro	LINEAR	·	3.5 km	MPC · JPL
66734	1999 TX_{114}	—	October 4, 1999	Socorro	LINEAR	MAR	2.9 km	MPC · JPL
66735	1999 TX_{115}	—	October 4, 1999	Socorro	LINEAR	·	2.4 km	MPC · JPL
66736	1999 TB_{118}	—	October 4, 1999	Socorro	LINEAR	·	5.7 km	MPC · JPL
66737	1999 TF_{119}	—	October 4, 1999	Socorro	LINEAR	·	3.6 km	MPC · JPL
66738	1999 TJ_{120}	—	October 4, 1999	Socorro	LINEAR	HOF	7.1 km	MPC · JPL
66739	1999 TC_{122}	—	October 4, 1999	Socorro	LINEAR	·	2.9 km	MPC · JPL
66740	1999 TE_{122}	—	October 4, 1999	Socorro	LINEAR	·	5.9 km	MPC · JPL
66741	1999 TY_{122}	—	October 4, 1999	Socorro	LINEAR	·	3.1 km	MPC · JPL
66742	1999 TP_{123}	—	October 4, 1999	Socorro	LINEAR	KOR	4.3 km	MPC · JPL
66743	1999 TW_{124}	—	October 4, 1999	Socorro	LINEAR	(5)	2.2 km	MPC · JPL
66744	1999 TM_{128}	—	October 5, 1999	Socorro	LINEAR	EUN	2.8 km	MPC · JPL
66745	1999 TO_{128}	—	October 5, 1999	Socorro	LINEAR	EUN	4.3 km	MPC · JPL
66746	1999 TW_{136}	—	October 6, 1999	Socorro	LINEAR	·	2.9 km	MPC · JPL
66747	1999 TO_{139}	—	October 6, 1999	Socorro	LINEAR	ADE	3.9 km	MPC · JPL
66748	1999 TJ_{149}	—	October 7, 1999	Socorro	LINEAR	·	5.7 km	MPC · JPL
66749	1999 TN_{151}	—	October 7, 1999	Socorro	LINEAR	·	4.3 km	MPC · JPL
66750	1999 TZ_{155}	—	October 7, 1999	Socorro	LINEAR	(5)	3.0 km	MPC · JPL
66751	1999 TP_{156}	—	October 8, 1999	Socorro	LINEAR	·	2.7 km	MPC · JPL
66752	1999 TZ_{164}	—	October 10, 1999	Socorro	LINEAR	·	1.5 km	MPC · JPL
66753	1999 TQ_{173}	—	October 10, 1999	Socorro	LINEAR	KOR	3.2 km	MPC · JPL
66754	1999 TZ_{173}	—	October 10, 1999	Socorro	LINEAR	·	3.2 km	MPC · JPL
66755	1999 TT_{175}	—	October 10, 1999	Socorro	LINEAR	EUN	3.7 km	MPC · JPL
66756	1999 TE_{177}	—	October 10, 1999	Socorro	LINEAR	·	2.9 km	MPC · JPL
66757	1999 TE_{184}	—	October 12, 1999	Socorro	LINEAR	·	5.3 km	MPC · JPL
66758	1999 TP_{184}	—	October 12, 1999	Socorro	LINEAR	·	3.4 km	MPC · JPL
66759	1999 TU_{185}	—	October 12, 1999	Socorro	LINEAR	·	6.7 km	MPC · JPL
66760	1999 TV_{185}	—	October 12, 1999	Socorro	LINEAR	·	5.8 km	MPC · JPL
66761	1999 TE_{187}	—	October 12, 1999	Socorro	LINEAR	EUN	3.5 km	MPC · JPL
66762	1999 TU_{187}	—	October 12, 1999	Socorro	LINEAR	·	8.6 km	MPC · JPL
66763	1999 TZ_{189}	—	October 12, 1999	Socorro	LINEAR	·	3.5 km	MPC · JPL
66764	1999 TD_{190}	—	October 12, 1999	Socorro	LINEAR	·	3.9 km	MPC · JPL
66765	1999 TJ_{191}	—	October 12, 1999	Socorro	LINEAR	·	9.2 km	MPC · JPL
66766	1999 TF_{194}	—	October 12, 1999	Socorro	LINEAR	·	3.7 km	MPC · JPL
66767	1999 TT_{194}	—	October 12, 1999	Socorro	LINEAR	·	2.4 km	MPC · JPL
66768	1999 TG_{200}	—	October 12, 1999	Socorro	LINEAR	·	3.1 km	MPC · JPL
66769	1999 TJ_{200}	—	October 12, 1999	Socorro	LINEAR	EUN	3.1 km	MPC · JPL
66770	1999 TH_{207}	—	October 14, 1999	Socorro	LINEAR	·	14 km	MPC · JPL
66771	1999 TM_{210}	—	October 14, 1999	Socorro	LINEAR	·	6.3 km	MPC · JPL
66772	1999 TH_{217}	—	October 15, 1999	Socorro	LINEAR	·	5.8 km	MPC · JPL
66773	1999 TT_{219}	—	October 1, 1999	Catalina	CSS	·	4.3 km	MPC · JPL
66774	1999 TD_{220}	—	October 1, 1999	Catalina	CSS	·	9.5 km	MPC · JPL
66775	1999 TS_{220}	—	October 1, 1999	Catalina	CSS	MRX · slow	3.5 km	MPC · JPL
66776	1999 TA_{221}	—	October 2, 1999	Catalina	CSS	MAR	2.9 km	MPC · JPL
66777	1999 TD_{221}	—	October 2, 1999	Catalina	CSS	·	4.0 km	MPC · JPL
66778	1999 TL_{221}	—	October 2, 1999	Socorro	LINEAR	·	3.3 km	MPC · JPL
66779	1999 TS_{221}	—	October 2, 1999	Socorro	LINEAR	GEF	3.7 km	MPC · JPL
66780	1999 TW_{223}	—	October 3, 1999	Catalina	CSS	EUN	3.2 km	MPC · JPL
66781	1999 TY_{223}	—	October 3, 1999	Anderson Mesa	LONEOS	·	4.1 km	MPC · JPL
66782	1999 TT_{225}	—	October 2, 1999	Kitt Peak	Spacewatch	·	4.8 km	MPC · JPL
66783	1999 TE_{227}	—	October 5, 1999	Socorro	LINEAR	MAR	4.2 km	MPC · JPL
66784	1999 TM_{228}	—	October 2, 1999	Socorro	LINEAR	·	2.3 km	MPC · JPL
66785	1999 TN_{228}	—	October 2, 1999	Socorro	LINEAR	·	3.9 km	MPC · JPL
66786	1999 TX_{228}	—	October 3, 1999	Kitt Peak	Spacewatch	(12739)	3.7 km	MPC · JPL
66787	1999 TY_{228}	—	October 3, 1999	Kitt Peak	Spacewatch	·	4.5 km	MPC · JPL
66788	1999 TL_{230}	—	October 3, 1999	Socorro	LINEAR	·	5.9 km	MPC · JPL
66789	1999 TS_{231}	—	October 5, 1999	Catalina	CSS	·	4.6 km	MPC · JPL
66790	1999 TZ_{232}	—	October 7, 1999	Catalina	CSS	·	3.3 km	MPC · JPL
66791	1999 TH_{233}	—	October 3, 1999	Catalina	CSS	·	5.5 km	MPC · JPL
66792	1999 TM_{233}	—	October 3, 1999	Socorro	LINEAR	MAR	3.9 km	MPC · JPL
66793	1999 TW_{236}	—	October 3, 1999	Catalina	CSS	GEF	2.6 km	MPC · JPL
66794	1999 TP_{237}	—	October 4, 1999	Socorro	LINEAR	·	3.2 km	MPC · JPL
66795	1999 TP_{248}	—	October 8, 1999	Catalina	CSS	·	3.4 km	MPC · JPL
66796	1999 TD_{252}	—	October 8, 1999	Socorro	LINEAR	·	4.7 km	MPC · JPL
66797	1999 TJ_{256}	—	October 9, 1999	Socorro	LINEAR	·	3.1 km	MPC · JPL
66798	1999 TA_{265}	—	October 3, 1999	Socorro	LINEAR	·	4.4 km	MPC · JPL
66799	1999 TT_{267}	—	October 3, 1999	Socorro	LINEAR	·	3.0 km	MPC · JPL
66800	1999 TB_{270}	—	October 3, 1999	Socorro	LINEAR	EOS	6.1 km	MPC · JPL

== 66801–66900 ==
back to top

Designation			Discovery			Properties		Ref
Permanent	Provisional	Named after	Date	Site	Discoverer(s)	Category	Diam.	Ref
66801	1999 TF_{270}	—	October 3, 1999	Socorro	LINEAR	GEF	3.4 km	MPC · JPL
66802	1999 TJ_{270}	—	October 3, 1999	Socorro	LINEAR	·	4.9 km	MPC · JPL
66803	1999 TD_{273}	—	October 5, 1999	Socorro	LINEAR	PAL	7.5 km	MPC · JPL
66804	1999 TE_{281}	—	October 8, 1999	Socorro	LINEAR	EUN	2.4 km	MPC · JPL
66805	1999 TU_{284}	—	October 9, 1999	Socorro	LINEAR	·	4.0 km	MPC · JPL
66806	1999 TC_{286}	—	October 10, 1999	Socorro	LINEAR	·	3.0 km	MPC · JPL
66807	1999 TD_{288}	—	October 10, 1999	Socorro	LINEAR	·	3.5 km	MPC · JPL
66808	1999 TU_{288}	—	October 10, 1999	Socorro	LINEAR	·	4.3 km	MPC · JPL
66809	1999 TX_{288}	—	October 10, 1999	Socorro	LINEAR	·	5.5 km	MPC · JPL
66810	1999 UM_{4}	—	October 29, 1999	Kitt Peak	Spacewatch	·	5.8 km	MPC · JPL
66811	1999 UA_{6}	—	October 18, 1999	Xinglong	SCAP	GEF	3.0 km	MPC · JPL
66812	1999 UE_{8}	—	October 29, 1999	Catalina	CSS	·	2.8 km	MPC · JPL
66813	1999 UQ_{11}	—	October 31, 1999	Socorro	LINEAR	·	5.4 km	MPC · JPL
66814	1999 UX_{12}	—	October 29, 1999	Catalina	CSS	(5)	3.3 km	MPC · JPL
66815	1999 UQ_{13}	—	October 29, 1999	Catalina	CSS	·	3.3 km	MPC · JPL
66816	1999 UO_{14}	—	October 29, 1999	Catalina	CSS	·	2.9 km	MPC · JPL
66817	1999 UR_{15}	—	October 29, 1999	Catalina	CSS	·	5.4 km	MPC · JPL
66818	1999 UT_{16}	—	October 29, 1999	Catalina	CSS	WIT	2.5 km	MPC · JPL
66819	1999 UZ_{16}	—	October 30, 1999	Catalina	CSS	·	2.8 km	MPC · JPL
66820	1999 UW_{17}	—	October 30, 1999	Kitt Peak	Spacewatch	·	2.5 km	MPC · JPL
66821	1999 UC_{21}	—	October 31, 1999	Kitt Peak	Spacewatch	·	3.4 km	MPC · JPL
66822	1999 UD_{22}	—	October 31, 1999	Kitt Peak	Spacewatch	THM	4.3 km	MPC · JPL
66823	1999 UA_{25}	—	October 28, 1999	Catalina	CSS	·	5.0 km	MPC · JPL
66824	1999 UM_{26}	—	October 30, 1999	Catalina	CSS	AGN	5.1 km	MPC · JPL
66825	1999 UZ_{27}	—	October 30, 1999	Kitt Peak	Spacewatch	·	2.7 km	MPC · JPL
66826	1999 UX_{36}	—	October 16, 1999	Kitt Peak	Spacewatch	EUN	4.3 km	MPC · JPL
66827	1999 UG_{37}	—	October 16, 1999	Kitt Peak	Spacewatch	·	2.4 km	MPC · JPL
66828	1999 UG_{41}	—	October 17, 1999	Anderson Mesa	LONEOS	·	4.4 km	MPC · JPL
66829	1999 UY_{42}	—	October 28, 1999	Catalina	CSS	·	3.6 km	MPC · JPL
66830	1999 UT_{43}	—	October 28, 1999	Anderson Mesa	LONEOS	EUN	3.7 km	MPC · JPL
66831	1999 UJ_{44}	—	October 29, 1999	Catalina	CSS	·	4.2 km	MPC · JPL
66832	1999 UE_{45}	—	October 31, 1999	Catalina	CSS	·	3.7 km	MPC · JPL
66833	1999 UP_{45}	—	October 31, 1999	Catalina	CSS	GEF	4.5 km	MPC · JPL
66834	1999 UT_{46}	—	October 31, 1999	Uccle	E. W. Elst	·	2.9 km	MPC · JPL
66835	1999 UQ_{47}	—	October 30, 1999	Catalina	CSS	EOS	5.2 km	MPC · JPL
66836	1999 UM_{48}	—	October 30, 1999	Catalina	CSS	·	5.6 km	MPC · JPL
66837	1999 US_{48}	—	October 31, 1999	Catalina	CSS	·	3.2 km	MPC · JPL
66838	1999 UF_{49}	—	October 31, 1999	Catalina	CSS	·	3.4 km	MPC · JPL
66839	1999 UE_{51}	—	October 31, 1999	Catalina	CSS	·	3.4 km	MPC · JPL
66840	1999 UU_{52}	—	October 31, 1999	Catalina	CSS	DOR	5.6 km	MPC · JPL
66841	1999 UA_{53}	—	October 31, 1999	Catalina	CSS	·	5.3 km	MPC · JPL
66842	1999 UG_{53}	—	October 20, 1999	Anderson Mesa	LONEOS	EUN	4.0 km	MPC · JPL
66843 Pulido	1999 VG	Pulido	November 1, 1999	Oaxaca	Roe, J. M.	·	5.4 km	MPC · JPL
66844	1999 VP	—	November 1, 1999	Fountain Hills	C. W. Juels	·	4.8 km	MPC · JPL
66845	1999 VE_{2}	—	November 5, 1999	High Point	D. K. Chesney	(5)	2.8 km	MPC · JPL
66846 Franklederer	1999 VP_{2}	Franklederer	November 6, 1999	Lime Creek	R. Linderholm	PAL	5.1 km	MPC · JPL
66847	1999 VT_{4}	—	November 5, 1999	Višnjan Observatory	K. Korlević	·	2.6 km	MPC · JPL
66848	1999 VX_{5}	—	November 5, 1999	Oizumi	T. Kobayashi	·	9.3 km	MPC · JPL
66849	1999 VM_{8}	—	November 4, 1999	Bédoin	P. Antonini	·	6.1 km	MPC · JPL
66850	1999 VX_{8}	—	November 9, 1999	Fountain Hills	C. W. Juels	·	6.5 km	MPC · JPL
66851	1999 VT_{9}	—	November 9, 1999	Fountain Hills	C. W. Juels	EUN	4.8 km	MPC · JPL
66852	1999 VH_{11}	—	November 9, 1999	Višnjan Observatory	K. Korlević	NEM	3.7 km	MPC · JPL
66853	1999 VH_{12}	—	November 10, 1999	High Point	D. K. Chesney	(1547)	4.8 km	MPC · JPL
66854	1999 VL_{19}	—	November 10, 1999	Višnjan Observatory	K. Korlević	·	2.5 km	MPC · JPL
66855	1999 VM_{22}	—	November 13, 1999	Fountain Hills	C. W. Juels	·	4.7 km	MPC · JPL
66856 Stephenvoss	1999 VW_{22}	Stephenvoss	November 13, 1999	Lake Tekapo	I. P. Griffin, Brady, N.	·	3.6 km	MPC · JPL
66857	1999 VQ_{25}	—	November 15, 1999	Kleť	Kleť	·	6.6 km	MPC · JPL
66858	1999 VJ_{27}	—	November 3, 1999	Catalina	CSS	·	2.8 km	MPC · JPL
66859	1999 VQ_{30}	—	November 3, 1999	Socorro	LINEAR	BRA	3.6 km	MPC · JPL
66860	1999 VZ_{30}	—	November 3, 1999	Socorro	LINEAR	GEF	2.7 km	MPC · JPL
66861	1999 VN_{31}	—	November 3, 1999	Socorro	LINEAR	·	3.7 km	MPC · JPL
66862	1999 VL_{37}	—	November 3, 1999	Socorro	LINEAR	·	4.8 km	MPC · JPL
66863	1999 VM_{43}	—	November 1, 1999	Catalina	CSS	·	4.5 km	MPC · JPL
66864	1999 VD_{44}	—	November 3, 1999	Catalina	CSS	·	5.1 km	MPC · JPL
66865	1999 VG_{44}	—	November 3, 1999	Catalina	CSS	·	4.4 km	MPC · JPL
66866	1999 VS_{45}	—	November 4, 1999	Catalina	CSS	·	11 km	MPC · JPL
66867	1999 VN_{47}	—	November 3, 1999	Socorro	LINEAR	EUN	5.0 km	MPC · JPL
66868	1999 VS_{47}	—	November 3, 1999	Socorro	LINEAR	KON	6.0 km	MPC · JPL
66869	1999 VX_{47}	—	November 3, 1999	Socorro	LINEAR	·	4.3 km	MPC · JPL
66870	1999 VE_{48}	—	November 3, 1999	Socorro	LINEAR	GEF	4.3 km	MPC · JPL
66871	1999 VN_{48}	—	November 3, 1999	Socorro	LINEAR	·	4.4 km	MPC · JPL
66872	1999 VH_{50}	—	November 3, 1999	Socorro	LINEAR	·	5.6 km	MPC · JPL
66873	1999 VJ_{50}	—	November 3, 1999	Socorro	LINEAR	·	3.3 km	MPC · JPL
66874	1999 VP_{50}	—	November 3, 1999	Socorro	LINEAR	·	2.8 km	MPC · JPL
66875	1999 VY_{52}	—	November 3, 1999	Socorro	LINEAR	fast	4.6 km	MPC · JPL
66876	1999 VC_{55}	—	November 4, 1999	Socorro	LINEAR	·	3.3 km	MPC · JPL
66877	1999 VT_{60}	—	November 4, 1999	Socorro	LINEAR	·	6.1 km	MPC · JPL
66878	1999 VM_{63}	—	November 4, 1999	Socorro	LINEAR	·	4.8 km	MPC · JPL
66879	1999 VK_{65}	—	November 4, 1999	Socorro	LINEAR	EOS	4.7 km	MPC · JPL
66880	1999 VO_{66}	—	November 4, 1999	Socorro	LINEAR	·	5.1 km	MPC · JPL
66881	1999 VL_{67}	—	November 4, 1999	Socorro	LINEAR	KOR	3.2 km	MPC · JPL
66882	1999 VZ_{67}	—	November 4, 1999	Socorro	LINEAR	·	4.1 km	MPC · JPL
66883	1999 VC_{70}	—	November 4, 1999	Socorro	LINEAR	KOR	2.5 km	MPC · JPL
66884	1999 VX_{70}	—	November 4, 1999	Socorro	LINEAR	AST	5.0 km	MPC · JPL
66885 Wangxiaomo	1999 VH_{72}	Wangxiaomo	November 12, 1999	Xinglong	SCAP	EOS	5.1 km	MPC · JPL
66886	1999 VJ_{72}	—	November 12, 1999	Xinglong	SCAP	·	6.2 km	MPC · JPL
66887	1999 VX_{74}	—	November 5, 1999	Kitt Peak	Spacewatch	GEF	5.8 km	MPC · JPL
66888	1999 VE_{78}	—	November 4, 1999	Socorro	LINEAR	·	3.7 km	MPC · JPL
66889	1999 VW_{78}	—	November 4, 1999	Socorro	LINEAR	·	3.9 km	MPC · JPL
66890	1999 VD_{81}	—	November 4, 1999	Socorro	LINEAR	·	3.9 km	MPC · JPL
66891	1999 VP_{85}	—	November 5, 1999	Catalina	CSS	·	3.9 km	MPC · JPL
66892	1999 VN_{87}	—	November 5, 1999	Socorro	LINEAR	·	4.2 km	MPC · JPL
66893	1999 VQ_{87}	—	November 5, 1999	Socorro	LINEAR	·	5.0 km	MPC · JPL
66894	1999 VB_{98}	—	November 9, 1999	Socorro	LINEAR	KOR	2.7 km	MPC · JPL
66895	1999 VO_{99}	—	November 9, 1999	Socorro	LINEAR	·	8.5 km	MPC · JPL
66896	1999 VN_{104}	—	November 9, 1999	Socorro	LINEAR	·	3.7 km	MPC · JPL
66897	1999 VZ_{113}	—	November 9, 1999	Catalina	CSS	·	5.1 km	MPC · JPL
66898	1999 VS_{114}	—	November 9, 1999	Catalina	CSS	ADE	7.9 km	MPC · JPL
66899	1999 VV_{114}	—	November 9, 1999	Catalina	CSS	EUN	4.1 km	MPC · JPL
66900	1999 VO_{126}	—	November 9, 1999	Kitt Peak	Spacewatch	·	2.7 km	MPC · JPL

== 66901–67000 ==
back to top

Designation			Discovery			Properties		Ref
Permanent	Provisional	Named after	Date	Site	Discoverer(s)	Category	Diam.	Ref
66901	1999 VK_{135}	—	November 13, 1999	Anderson Mesa	LONEOS	·	4.5 km	MPC · JPL
66902	1999 VK_{144}	—	November 11, 1999	Catalina	CSS	AGN	3.1 km	MPC · JPL
66903	1999 VK_{147}	—	November 12, 1999	Socorro	LINEAR	·	6.4 km	MPC · JPL
66904	1999 VA_{160}	—	November 14, 1999	Socorro	LINEAR	·	5.9 km	MPC · JPL
66905	1999 VC_{160}	—	November 14, 1999	Socorro	LINEAR	·	4.9 km	MPC · JPL
66906	1999 VG_{162}	—	November 14, 1999	Socorro	LINEAR	AGN	2.5 km	MPC · JPL
66907	1999 VJ_{162}	—	November 14, 1999	Socorro	LINEAR	·	4.2 km	MPC · JPL
66908	1999 VY_{162}	—	November 14, 1999	Socorro	LINEAR	KOR	3.4 km	MPC · JPL
66909	1999 VD_{163}	—	November 14, 1999	Socorro	LINEAR	·	3.8 km	MPC · JPL
66910	1999 VZ_{165}	—	November 14, 1999	Socorro	LINEAR	V	1.6 km	MPC · JPL
66911	1999 VF_{167}	—	November 14, 1999	Socorro	LINEAR	·	3.3 km	MPC · JPL
66912	1999 VH_{167}	—	November 14, 1999	Socorro	LINEAR	KOR	3.5 km	MPC · JPL
66913	1999 VF_{169}	—	November 14, 1999	Socorro	LINEAR	KOR	2.9 km	MPC · JPL
66914	1999 VK_{170}	—	November 14, 1999	Socorro	LINEAR	MAS	1.4 km	MPC · JPL
66915	1999 VT_{170}	—	November 14, 1999	Socorro	LINEAR	·	4.5 km	MPC · JPL
66916	1999 VG_{176}	—	November 3, 1999	Socorro	LINEAR	·	2.8 km	MPC · JPL
66917	1999 VP_{176}	—	November 5, 1999	Socorro	LINEAR	MAR	4.2 km	MPC · JPL
66918	1999 VY_{176}	—	November 5, 1999	Socorro	LINEAR	·	3.2 km	MPC · JPL
66919	1999 VC_{177}	—	November 5, 1999	Socorro	LINEAR	·	3.3 km	MPC · JPL
66920	1999 VN_{178}	—	November 6, 1999	Socorro	LINEAR	·	4.0 km	MPC · JPL
66921	1999 VY_{178}	—	November 6, 1999	Socorro	LINEAR	·	5.3 km	MPC · JPL
66922	1999 VC_{185}	—	November 15, 1999	Socorro	LINEAR	(5)	3.1 km	MPC · JPL
66923	1999 VL_{186}	—	November 15, 1999	Socorro	LINEAR	·	3.4 km	MPC · JPL
66924	1999 VY_{186}	—	November 15, 1999	Socorro	LINEAR	·	7.1 km	MPC · JPL
66925	1999 VZ_{190}	—	November 10, 1999	Socorro	LINEAR	PHO	5.0 km	MPC · JPL
66926	1999 VE_{193}	—	November 1, 1999	Anderson Mesa	LONEOS	·	6.9 km	MPC · JPL
66927	1999 VP_{199}	—	November 2, 1999	Catalina	CSS	AEG	7.3 km	MPC · JPL
66928	1999 VQ_{199}	—	November 2, 1999	Catalina	CSS	·	4.7 km	MPC · JPL
66929	1999 VS_{199}	—	November 4, 1999	Anderson Mesa	LONEOS	·	3.3 km	MPC · JPL
66930	1999 VG_{201}	—	November 3, 1999	Socorro	LINEAR	·	5.1 km	MPC · JPL
66931	1999 VL_{208}	—	November 10, 1999	Socorro	LINEAR	fast	12 km	MPC · JPL
66932	1999 VL_{213}	—	November 13, 1999	Anderson Mesa	LONEOS	·	3.2 km	MPC · JPL
66933	1999 VK_{229}	—	November 5, 1999	Socorro	LINEAR	·	3.7 km	MPC · JPL
66934 Kálalová	1999 WF_{1}	Kálalová	November 26, 1999	Kleť	J. Tichá, M. Tichý	·	4.5 km	MPC · JPL
66935	1999 WZ_{1}	—	November 26, 1999	Višnjan Observatory	K. Korlević	CLO	5.9 km	MPC · JPL
66936	1999 WD_{5}	—	November 28, 1999	Oizumi	T. Kobayashi	EUN	4.7 km	MPC · JPL
66937	1999 WB_{6}	—	November 28, 1999	Višnjan Observatory	K. Korlević	·	3.8 km	MPC · JPL
66938	1999 WM_{8}	—	November 29, 1999	Monte Agliale	S. Donati	·	2.9 km	MPC · JPL
66939 Franscini	1999 WQ_{8}	Franscini	November 28, 1999	Gnosca	S. Sposetti	EOS	5.1 km	MPC · JPL
66940	1999 WM_{11}	—	November 29, 1999	Nachi-Katsuura	Shiozawa, H., T. Urata	DOR	7.4 km	MPC · JPL
66941	1999 WO_{11}	—	November 29, 1999	Nachi-Katsuura	Shiozawa, H., T. Urata	·	6.7 km	MPC · JPL
66942	1999 WR_{12}	—	November 29, 1999	Kitt Peak	Spacewatch	·	3.6 km	MPC · JPL
66943	1999 WF_{17}	—	November 30, 1999	Kitt Peak	Spacewatch	·	3.7 km	MPC · JPL
66944	1999 WQ_{20}	—	November 16, 1999	Catalina	CSS	·	4.2 km	MPC · JPL
66945	1999 XA_{1}	—	December 2, 1999	Oizumi	T. Kobayashi	EOS ·	6.2 km	MPC · JPL
66946	1999 XT_{1}	—	December 3, 1999	Baton Rouge	W. R. Cooney Jr.	·	8.9 km	MPC · JPL
66947	1999 XZ_{1}	—	December 3, 1999	Fountain Hills	C. W. Juels	GEF	4.6 km	MPC · JPL
66948	1999 XN_{5}	—	December 4, 1999	Catalina	CSS	KOR	2.9 km	MPC · JPL
66949	1999 XO_{7}	—	December 4, 1999	Fountain Hills	C. W. Juels	EUN	6.5 km	MPC · JPL
66950	1999 XQ_{11}	—	December 6, 1999	Catalina	CSS	·	4.8 km	MPC · JPL
66951	1999 XN_{13}	—	December 5, 1999	Socorro	LINEAR	·	5.8 km	MPC · JPL
66952	1999 XF_{19}	—	December 3, 1999	Socorro	LINEAR	·	4.7 km	MPC · JPL
66953	1999 XM_{19}	—	December 3, 1999	Socorro	LINEAR	ADE	5.0 km	MPC · JPL
66954	1999 XV_{19}	—	December 5, 1999	Socorro	LINEAR	ADE	6.1 km	MPC · JPL
66955	1999 XK_{20}	—	December 5, 1999	Socorro	LINEAR	·	2.9 km	MPC · JPL
66956	1999 XE_{21}	—	December 5, 1999	Socorro	LINEAR	·	1.5 km	MPC · JPL
66957	1999 XO_{21}	—	December 5, 1999	Socorro	LINEAR	·	4.2 km	MPC · JPL
66958	1999 XO_{23}	—	December 6, 1999	Socorro	LINEAR	·	6.3 km	MPC · JPL
66959	1999 XO_{35}	—	December 6, 1999	Socorro	LINEAR	AMO +1km	1.5 km	MPC · JPL
66960	1999 XN_{36}	—	December 7, 1999	Fountain Hills	C. W. Juels	EUN	4.8 km	MPC · JPL
66961	1999 XU_{41}	—	December 7, 1999	Socorro	LINEAR	(5)	3.3 km	MPC · JPL
66962	1999 XL_{42}	—	December 7, 1999	Socorro	LINEAR	NYS	2.4 km	MPC · JPL
66963	1999 XU_{43}	—	December 7, 1999	Socorro	LINEAR	·	3.8 km	MPC · JPL
66964	1999 XC_{49}	—	December 7, 1999	Socorro	LINEAR	EOS	4.1 km	MPC · JPL
66965	1999 XL_{49}	—	December 7, 1999	Socorro	LINEAR	·	6.2 km	MPC · JPL
66966	1999 XJ_{52}	—	December 7, 1999	Socorro	LINEAR	·	8.5 km	MPC · JPL
66967	1999 XB_{53}	—	December 7, 1999	Socorro	LINEAR	·	5.4 km	MPC · JPL
66968	1999 XU_{53}	—	December 7, 1999	Socorro	LINEAR	·	2.0 km	MPC · JPL
66969	1999 XW_{54}	—	December 7, 1999	Socorro	LINEAR	·	3.3 km	MPC · JPL
66970	1999 XV_{58}	—	December 7, 1999	Socorro	LINEAR	·	3.6 km	MPC · JPL
66971	1999 XG_{59}	—	December 7, 1999	Socorro	LINEAR	·	4.1 km	MPC · JPL
66972	1999 XE_{64}	—	December 7, 1999	Socorro	LINEAR	·	2.8 km	MPC · JPL
66973	1999 XM_{66}	—	December 7, 1999	Socorro	LINEAR	·	1.6 km	MPC · JPL
66974	1999 XG_{70}	—	December 7, 1999	Socorro	LINEAR	CLO	4.9 km	MPC · JPL
66975	1999 XR_{75}	—	December 7, 1999	Socorro	LINEAR	KOR	3.0 km	MPC · JPL
66976	1999 XN_{78}	—	December 7, 1999	Socorro	LINEAR	·	3.8 km	MPC · JPL
66977	1999 XX_{82}	—	December 7, 1999	Socorro	LINEAR	·	8.5 km	MPC · JPL
66978	1999 XE_{86}	—	December 7, 1999	Socorro	LINEAR	·	4.2 km	MPC · JPL
66979	1999 XR_{86}	—	December 7, 1999	Socorro	LINEAR	·	9.4 km	MPC · JPL
66980	1999 XK_{88}	—	December 7, 1999	Socorro	LINEAR	·	6.3 km	MPC · JPL
66981	1999 XE_{89}	—	December 7, 1999	Socorro	LINEAR	EOS	6.3 km	MPC · JPL
66982	1999 XA_{91}	—	December 7, 1999	Socorro	LINEAR	·	7.4 km	MPC · JPL
66983	1999 XB_{92}	—	December 7, 1999	Socorro	LINEAR	EOS	8.9 km	MPC · JPL
66984	1999 XY_{92}	—	December 7, 1999	Socorro	LINEAR	EOS	4.4 km	MPC · JPL
66985	1999 XT_{93}	—	December 7, 1999	Socorro	LINEAR	·	13 km	MPC · JPL
66986	1999 XH_{95}	—	December 7, 1999	Oizumi	T. Kobayashi	EOS	4.5 km	MPC · JPL
66987	1999 XU_{95}	—	December 9, 1999	Oizumi	T. Kobayashi	EOS	5.0 km	MPC · JPL
66988	1999 XN_{97}	—	December 7, 1999	Socorro	LINEAR	·	3.2 km	MPC · JPL
66989	1999 XZ_{102}	—	December 7, 1999	Socorro	LINEAR	·	7.6 km	MPC · JPL
66990	1999 XA_{103}	—	December 7, 1999	Socorro	LINEAR	THM	7.3 km	MPC · JPL
66991	1999 XE_{105}	—	December 9, 1999	Fountain Hills	C. W. Juels	·	5.5 km	MPC · JPL
66992	1999 XY_{106}	—	December 4, 1999	Catalina	CSS	EOS	5.0 km	MPC · JPL
66993	1999 XJ_{107}	—	December 4, 1999	Catalina	CSS	·	3.1 km	MPC · JPL
66994	1999 XZ_{107}	—	December 4, 1999	Catalina	CSS	·	3.7 km	MPC · JPL
66995	1999 XN_{109}	—	December 4, 1999	Catalina	CSS	·	2.9 km	MPC · JPL
66996	1999 XJ_{113}	—	December 11, 1999	Socorro	LINEAR	·	6.4 km	MPC · JPL
66997	1999 XR_{113}	—	December 11, 1999	Socorro	LINEAR	EUN	4.8 km	MPC · JPL
66998	1999 XY_{113}	—	December 11, 1999	Socorro	LINEAR	·	4.1 km	MPC · JPL
66999 Cudnik	1999 XX_{115}	Cudnik	December 5, 1999	Catalina	CSS	EOS	5.2 km	MPC · JPL
67000	1999 XT_{116}	—	December 5, 1999	Catalina	CSS	V	1.4 km	MPC · JPL

back to top

== See also ==
- Meanings of minor-planet names: 66001–67000
