= Meanings of minor-planet names: 152001–153000 =

As minor planet discoveries are confirmed, they are given a permanent number by the IAU's Minor Planet Center (MPC), and the discoverers can then submit names for them, following the IAU's naming conventions. The list below concerns those minor planets in the specified number-range that have received names, and explains the meanings of those names.

Official naming citations of newly named small Solar System bodies are approved and published in a bulletin by IAU's Working Group for Small Bodies Nomenclature (WGSBN). Before May 2021, citations were published in MPC's Minor Planet Circulars for many decades. Recent citations can also be found on the JPL Small-Body Database (SBDB). Until his death in 2016, German astronomer Lutz D. Schmadel compiled these citations into the Dictionary of Minor Planet Names (DMP) and regularly updated the collection.

Based on Paul Herget's The Names of the Minor Planets, Schmadel also researched the unclear origin of numerous asteroids, most of which had been named prior to World War II. This article incorporates text from this source, which is in the public domain: SBDB New namings may only be added to this list below after official publication as the preannouncement of names is condemned. The WGSBN publishes a comprehensive guideline for the naming rules of non-cometary small Solar System bodies.

== 152001–152100 ==
Named minor planet	Provisional	This minor planet was named for...	Ref · Catalog
152067 Deboy	2004 PK_{111}	Christopher C. Deboy (born 1969) is a radio-frequency engineer at the Johns Hopkins University Applied Physics Laboratory, who served as the Radio Communications System Lead for the New Horizons mission to Pluto.	JPL · 152067

== 152101–152200 ==
back to top

Named minor planet	Provisional	This minor planet was named for...	Ref · Catalog
152146 Rosenlappin	2005 LJ_{15}	Gary Rosenbaum (born 1952) and Terri Lappin (born 1961) have organized observing and outreach activities within the Tucson Amateur Astronomy Association for several decades	JPL · 152146
152188 Morricone	2005 QP_{51}	Ennio Morricone (1928–2020), prolific Italian film composer	JPL · 152188

== 152201–152300 ==
back to top

Named minor planet	Provisional	This minor planet was named for...	Ref · Catalog
152226 Saracole	2005 SD_{3}	Sara Loraine Cole (born 1969), American biologist and animal behaviorist	JPL · 152226
152227 Argoli	2005 SO_{4}	Andrea Argoli (1570–1657), Paduan astronomer, mathematician and physician	JPL · 152227
152233 Van Till	2005 SL_{19}	Howard J. Van Till (born 1938), physics professor at Calvin College from 1965 until 1997	JPL · 152233
152290 Lorettaoberheim	2005 TB_{23}	Loretta Oberheim (born 1954) and her efforts in healthcare services and charity involvement in the State of Delaware.	JPL · 152290
152299 Vanautgaerden	2005 TQ_{50}	Jan Vanautgaerden (born 1978), a passionate Belgian amateur astronomer.	JPL · 152299

== 152301–152400 ==
back to top

Named minor planet	Provisional	This minor planet was named for...	Ref · Catalog
152319 Pynchon	2005 UH_{7}	Thomas R. Pynchon Jr. (born 1937), an American novelist.	JPL · 152319
152320 Lichtenknecker	2005 UD_{8}	Dieter Lichtenknecker (1933–1990) was a German telescope maker. He founded his company in 1959 in Weil der Stadt and later moved to Hasselt, Belgium. He was well known for his Database on Variable Stars.	JPL · 152320
152336 Nicolecarr	2005 UN_{51}	Nicole Carr (b. 1988), a British astronomer, astrophotographer, and aurora borealis chaser.	IAU · 152336
152337 Sakeenaburson	2005 UO_{55}	Sakeena Burson (b. 1983), a British amateur astronomer and astrophotographer.	IAU · 152337
152341 Rupesnigra	2005 UE_{67}	Rupes Nigra, legendary island first mentioned in the lost 14th-century book Inventio Fortunata as a magnetic rock at the North Pole.	IAU · 152341

== 152401–152500 ==
back to top

Named minor planet	Provisional	This minor planet was named for...	Ref · Catalog
152454 Darnyi	2005 VS_{2}	Tamás Darnyi (born 1967), Hungarian swimmer	JPL · 152454
152472 Brendlé	2005 WZ_{3}	Bernard Brendlé (1933–2024), French telescope maker, one of the founders of the Société Astronomique du Haut-Rhin.	JPL · 152472
152481 Stabia	2005 WY_{57}	Castellammare di Stabia, a city in southern Italy.	JPL · 152481

== 152501–152600 ==
back to top

Named minor planet	Provisional	This minor planet was named for...	Ref · Catalog
152533 Aggas	2007 AL_{26}	Steven Aggas, American engineer and founder of the Apache-Sitgreaves Center for Astrophysics in Arizona	JPL · 152533
152559 Bodelschwingh	1990 TM_{13}	Friedrich von Bodelschwingh the Elder (1831–1910), German founder of the Bodelschwinghsche Anstalten Bethel charitable foundations	JPL · 152559
152583 Saône	1994 TF	Saône, a small town in eastern France.	IAU · 152583

== 152601–152700 ==
back to top

Named minor planet	Provisional	This minor planet was named for...	Ref · Catalog
152641 Fredreed	1997 RJ_{3}	Frederick Reed (1906–1978), grandfather of David R. De Graff who co-discovered this minor planet	JPL · 152641
152647 Rinako	1997 UF_{15}	Rinako Asami (born 1993), daughter of Atsuo Asami who discovered this minor planet	JPL · 152647
152657 Yukifumi	1997 XO_{2}	Yukifumi Murakami (born 1979), Japanese javelin thrower	JPL · 152657

== 152701–152800 ==
back to top

Named minor planet	Provisional	This minor planet was named for...	Ref · Catalog
152733 Vincenclesný	1998 WL_{8}	Vincenc Lesný, Czech Indologist, teacher, writer, translator and a leading figure in Czech Orientalism in the first half of the 20th century.	IAU · 152733
152750 Brloh	1999 BL_{5}	The Czech village of Brloh, originally belonging to the Rosenbergs, is situated right in the heart of the Blanský les (see 47294) Protected Landscape Area	JPL · 152750

== 152801–152900 ==
back to top

Named minor planet	Provisional	This minor planet was named for...	Ref · Catalog
152830 Dinkinesh	1999 VD_{57}	Dink’inesh, the Ethiopian name for the Lucy fossil, after which NASA's Lucy mission is named.	JPL · 152830

== 152901–153000 ==
back to top

Named minor planet	Provisional	This minor planet was named for...	Ref · Catalog
152985 Kenkellermann	2000 GS_{182}	Kenneth Irwin Kellermann (born 1937), a radio astronomer at the (U.S.) National Radio Astronomy Observatory.	JPL · 152985

back to top

Preceded by 151,001–152,000	Meanings of minor-planet names List of minor planets: 152,001–153,000	Succeeded by 153,001–154,000
