= Morricone =

Morricone may refer to:

- Morricone Youth, an American band
- 152188 Morricone, an asteroid

== People with the surname ==
- Andrea Morricone (born 1964), Italian composer and conductor
- Ennio Morricone (1928–2020), Italian composer, orchestrator, conductor, and trumpet player
