= List of minor planets: 152001–153000 =

The following is a partial list of minor planets, running from minor-planet number 152001 through 153000, inclusive. The primary data for this and other partial lists is based on JPL's "Small-Body Orbital Elements" and data available from the Minor Planet Center. Critical list information is also provided by the MPC, unless otherwise specified from Lowell Observatory. A detailed description of the table's columns and additional sources are given on the main page including a complete list of every page in this series, and a statistical break-up on the dynamical classification of minor planets.

Also see the summary list of all named bodies in numerical and alphabetical order, and the corresponding naming citations for the number range of this particular list. New namings may only be added to this list after official publication, as the preannouncement of names is condemned by the Working Group for Small Bodies Nomenclature of the International Astronomical Union.

Near-Earth obj.	MBA (inner)	MBA (outer)	Centaur
Mars-crosser	MBA (middle)	Jupiter trojan	Trans-Neptunian obj.
Unclassified

== 152001–152100 ==
Designation			Discovery			Properties		Ref
Permanent	Provisional	Named after	Date	Site	Discoverer(s)	Category	Diam.	Ref
152001	2004 JH_{18}	—	May 13, 2004	Kitt Peak	Spacewatch	·	2.0 km	MPC · JPL
152002	2004 JE_{19}	—	May 13, 2004	Palomar	NEAT	TEL	2.3 km	MPC · JPL
152003	2004 JV_{21}	—	May 9, 2004	Kitt Peak	Spacewatch	(5)	2.1 km	MPC · JPL
152004	2004 JX_{26}	—	May 15, 2004	Socorro	LINEAR	NYS	1.3 km	MPC · JPL
152005	2004 JJ_{27}	—	May 15, 2004	Socorro	LINEAR	·	3.2 km	MPC · JPL
152006	2004 JX_{30}	—	May 15, 2004	Socorro	LINEAR	·	1.5 km	MPC · JPL
152007	2004 JR_{32}	—	May 15, 2004	Socorro	LINEAR	·	2.6 km	MPC · JPL
152008	2004 JS_{32}	—	May 15, 2004	Socorro	LINEAR	·	1.3 km	MPC · JPL
152009	2004 JW_{32}	—	May 15, 2004	Socorro	LINEAR	V	1.1 km	MPC · JPL
152010	2004 JC_{33}	—	May 15, 2004	Socorro	LINEAR	·	2.3 km	MPC · JPL
152011	2004 JM_{34}	—	May 15, 2004	Socorro	LINEAR	·	2.4 km	MPC · JPL
152012	2004 JG_{35}	—	May 15, 2004	Socorro	LINEAR	·	2.5 km	MPC · JPL
152013	2004 JG_{36}	—	May 13, 2004	Anderson Mesa	LONEOS	·	1.6 km	MPC · JPL
152014	2004 JR_{42}	—	May 15, 2004	Socorro	LINEAR	·	3.0 km	MPC · JPL
152015	2004 JH_{43}	—	May 15, 2004	Socorro	LINEAR	·	1.3 km	MPC · JPL
152016	2004 JP_{51}	—	May 14, 2004	Socorro	LINEAR	·	2.0 km	MPC · JPL
152017	2004 KR_{6}	—	May 18, 2004	Socorro	LINEAR	·	2.6 km	MPC · JPL
152018	2004 KJ_{9}	—	May 18, 2004	Socorro	LINEAR	·	1.2 km	MPC · JPL
152019	2004 KO_{10}	—	May 20, 2004	Siding Spring	SSS	·	4.2 km	MPC · JPL
152020	2004 KS_{13}	—	May 21, 2004	Catalina	CSS	·	1.5 km	MPC · JPL
152021	2004 LH_{2}	—	June 10, 2004	Reedy Creek	J. Broughton	·	2.0 km	MPC · JPL
152022	2004 LF_{23}	—	June 15, 2004	Socorro	LINEAR	·	2.4 km	MPC · JPL
152023	2004 MC_{4}	—	June 21, 2004	Socorro	LINEAR	·	5.7 km	MPC · JPL
152024	2004 MZ_{6}	—	June 24, 2004	Bergisch Gladbach	W. Bickel	EOS	3.0 km	MPC · JPL
152025	2004 NP	—	July 8, 2004	Reedy Creek	J. Broughton	·	1.8 km	MPC · JPL
152026	2004 NO_{5}	—	July 11, 2004	Socorro	LINEAR	·	1.9 km	MPC · JPL
152027	2004 ND_{8}	—	July 11, 2004	Socorro	LINEAR	·	2.1 km	MPC · JPL
152028	2004 NB_{21}	—	July 14, 2004	Socorro	LINEAR	·	4.0 km	MPC · JPL
152029	2004 ND_{21}	—	July 14, 2004	Socorro	LINEAR	NEM	3.7 km	MPC · JPL
152030	2004 NT_{21}	—	July 15, 2004	Socorro	LINEAR	·	2.3 km	MPC · JPL
152031	2004 NL_{23}	—	July 14, 2004	Socorro	LINEAR	·	1.7 km	MPC · JPL
152032	2004 NW_{23}	—	July 14, 2004	Socorro	LINEAR	·	2.4 km	MPC · JPL
152033	2004 NF_{26}	—	July 11, 2004	Socorro	LINEAR	(13314)	2.8 km	MPC · JPL
152034	2004 NH_{27}	—	July 11, 2004	Socorro	LINEAR	WIT	1.4 km	MPC · JPL
152035	2004 NQ_{29}	—	July 14, 2004	Socorro	LINEAR	·	2.3 km	MPC · JPL
152036	2004 OR_{2}	—	July 16, 2004	Socorro	LINEAR	·	3.2 km	MPC · JPL
152037	2004 OQ_{11}	—	July 25, 2004	Anderson Mesa	LONEOS	·	7.2 km	MPC · JPL
152038	2004 OW_{12}	—	July 27, 2004	Socorro	LINEAR	MAS	1.2 km	MPC · JPL
152039	2004 PR_{7}	—	August 6, 2004	Palomar	NEAT	TIR	2.7 km	MPC · JPL
152040	2004 PA_{10}	—	August 6, 2004	Campo Imperatore	CINEOS	·	3.6 km	MPC · JPL
152041	2004 PA_{13}	—	August 7, 2004	Palomar	NEAT	·	2.0 km	MPC · JPL
152042	2004 PP_{14}	—	August 7, 2004	Palomar	NEAT	·	3.5 km	MPC · JPL
152043	2004 PP_{20}	—	August 6, 2004	Palomar	NEAT	·	6.6 km	MPC · JPL
152044	2004 PS_{21}	—	August 8, 2004	Palomar	NEAT	·	4.2 km	MPC · JPL
152045	2004 PS_{23}	—	August 8, 2004	Socorro	LINEAR	·	3.4 km	MPC · JPL
152046	2004 PB_{30}	—	August 7, 2004	Palomar	NEAT	GEF	2.1 km	MPC · JPL
152047	2004 PJ_{31}	—	August 8, 2004	Socorro	LINEAR	·	2.4 km	MPC · JPL
152048	2004 PB_{37}	—	August 9, 2004	Socorro	LINEAR	KOR	2.2 km	MPC · JPL
152049	2004 PT_{38}	—	August 9, 2004	Socorro	LINEAR	·	3.9 km	MPC · JPL
152050	2004 PB_{39}	—	August 9, 2004	Anderson Mesa	LONEOS	THM	5.6 km	MPC · JPL
152051	2004 PH_{39}	—	August 9, 2004	Socorro	LINEAR	·	3.3 km	MPC · JPL
152052	2004 PC_{40}	—	August 9, 2004	Socorro	LINEAR	·	3.9 km	MPC · JPL
152053	2004 PN_{44}	—	August 7, 2004	Palomar	NEAT	EUN	2.2 km	MPC · JPL
152054	2004 PR_{50}	—	August 8, 2004	Socorro	LINEAR	·	2.7 km	MPC · JPL
152055	2004 PN_{54}	—	August 8, 2004	Anderson Mesa	LONEOS	·	1.6 km	MPC · JPL
152056	2004 PD_{69}	—	August 7, 2004	Palomar	NEAT	·	3.2 km	MPC · JPL
152057	2004 PX_{71}	—	August 8, 2004	Socorro	LINEAR	·	4.2 km	MPC · JPL
152058	2004 PZ_{71}	—	August 8, 2004	Socorro	LINEAR	·	2.6 km	MPC · JPL
152059	2004 PB_{75}	—	August 8, 2004	Anderson Mesa	LONEOS	·	2.7 km	MPC · JPL
152060	2004 PK_{76}	—	August 9, 2004	Anderson Mesa	LONEOS	EOS	3.1 km	MPC · JPL
152061	2004 PM_{77}	—	August 9, 2004	Socorro	LINEAR	·	3.4 km	MPC · JPL
152062	2004 PQ_{79}	—	August 9, 2004	Socorro	LINEAR	·	2.3 km	MPC · JPL
152063	2004 PH_{90}	—	August 10, 2004	Socorro	LINEAR	·	4.0 km	MPC · JPL
152064	2004 PL_{94}	—	August 10, 2004	Socorro	LINEAR	·	3.0 km	MPC · JPL
152065	2004 PC_{96}	—	August 10, 2004	Socorro	LINEAR	KOR	2.2 km	MPC · JPL
152066	2004 PT_{108}	—	August 10, 2004	Socorro	LINEAR	fast?	1.8 km	MPC · JPL
152067 Deboy	2004 PK_{111}	Deboy	August 15, 2004	Cerro Tololo	M. W. Buie	·	2.5 km	MPC · JPL
152068	2004 QG_{11}	—	August 21, 2004	Siding Spring	SSS	·	3.6 km	MPC · JPL
152069	2004 QV_{21}	—	August 25, 2004	Kitt Peak	Spacewatch	·	2.9 km	MPC · JPL
152070	2004 RV_{5}	—	September 4, 2004	Palomar	NEAT	·	3.5 km	MPC · JPL
152071	2004 RW_{7}	—	September 6, 2004	Saint-Véran	St. Veran	·	1.9 km	MPC · JPL
152072	2004 RF_{9}	—	September 7, 2004	Eskridge	Farpoint	·	2.5 km	MPC · JPL
152073	2004 RH_{12}	—	September 8, 2004	Socorro	LINEAR	·	4.8 km	MPC · JPL
152074	2004 RC_{14}	—	September 6, 2004	Siding Spring	SSS	EOS	2.6 km	MPC · JPL
152075	2004 RL_{14}	—	September 6, 2004	Siding Spring	SSS	·	4.0 km	MPC · JPL
152076	2004 RD_{16}	—	September 7, 2004	Kitt Peak	Spacewatch	HOF	4.0 km	MPC · JPL
152077	2004 RA_{17}	—	September 7, 2004	Kitt Peak	Spacewatch	(7744)	2.5 km	MPC · JPL
152078	2004 RW_{19}	—	September 7, 2004	Socorro	LINEAR	EOS	3.4 km	MPC · JPL
152079	2004 RS_{21}	—	September 7, 2004	Kitt Peak	Spacewatch	·	2.8 km	MPC · JPL
152080	2004 RV_{21}	—	September 7, 2004	Kitt Peak	Spacewatch	·	6.5 km	MPC · JPL
152081	2004 RD_{27}	—	September 6, 2004	Palomar	NEAT	·	5.5 km	MPC · JPL
152082	2004 RR_{29}	—	September 7, 2004	Socorro	LINEAR	·	2.0 km	MPC · JPL
152083	2004 RH_{30}	—	September 7, 2004	Socorro	LINEAR	HOF	4.4 km	MPC · JPL
152084	2004 RR_{33}	—	September 7, 2004	Socorro	LINEAR	·	4.5 km	MPC · JPL
152085	2004 RE_{34}	—	September 7, 2004	Socorro	LINEAR	·	4.6 km	MPC · JPL
152086	2004 RT_{34}	—	September 7, 2004	Socorro	LINEAR	·	4.2 km	MPC · JPL
152087	2004 RJ_{37}	—	September 7, 2004	Socorro	LINEAR	·	4.6 km	MPC · JPL
152088	2004 RB_{39}	—	September 7, 2004	Kitt Peak	Spacewatch	·	2.6 km	MPC · JPL
152089	2004 RW_{43}	—	September 8, 2004	Socorro	LINEAR	·	4.0 km	MPC · JPL
152090	2004 RR_{49}	—	September 8, 2004	Socorro	LINEAR	·	3.6 km	MPC · JPL
152091	2004 RD_{50}	—	September 8, 2004	Socorro	LINEAR	·	2.5 km	MPC · JPL
152092	2004 RB_{63}	—	September 8, 2004	Socorro	LINEAR	KOR	2.1 km	MPC · JPL
152093	2004 RX_{63}	—	September 8, 2004	Socorro	LINEAR	KOR	2.3 km	MPC · JPL
152094	2004 RO_{71}	—	September 8, 2004	Socorro	LINEAR	T_{j} (2.99) · HIL · 3:2 · (6124)	10 km	MPC · JPL
152095	2004 RP_{72}	—	September 8, 2004	Socorro	LINEAR	VER	5.4 km	MPC · JPL
152096	2004 RT_{74}	—	September 8, 2004	Socorro	LINEAR	·	3.2 km	MPC · JPL
152097	2004 RB_{90}	—	September 8, 2004	Socorro	LINEAR	·	3.4 km	MPC · JPL
152098	2004 RZ_{91}	—	September 8, 2004	Socorro	LINEAR	·	4.8 km	MPC · JPL
152099	2004 RT_{92}	—	September 8, 2004	Socorro	LINEAR	·	4.3 km	MPC · JPL
152100	2004 RD_{101}	—	September 8, 2004	Socorro	LINEAR	·	6.0 km	MPC · JPL

== 152101–152200 ==
back to top

Designation			Discovery			Properties		Ref
Permanent	Provisional	Named after	Date	Site	Discoverer(s)	Category	Diam.	Ref
152101	2004 RU_{101}	—	September 8, 2004	Socorro	LINEAR	·	2.3 km	MPC · JPL
152102	2004 RD_{107}	—	September 9, 2004	Socorro	LINEAR	HYG	5.5 km	MPC · JPL
152103	2004 RN_{109}	—	September 8, 2004	Socorro	LINEAR	·	4.3 km	MPC · JPL
152104	2004 RX_{120}	—	September 7, 2004	Kitt Peak	Spacewatch	·	5.7 km	MPC · JPL
152105	2004 RM_{121}	—	September 7, 2004	Kitt Peak	Spacewatch	·	3.1 km	MPC · JPL
152106	2004 RJ_{146}	—	September 9, 2004	Socorro	LINEAR	·	3.6 km	MPC · JPL
152107	2004 RF_{149}	—	September 9, 2004	Socorro	LINEAR	·	1.8 km	MPC · JPL
152108	2004 RK_{153}	—	September 10, 2004	Socorro	LINEAR	EOS	3.3 km	MPC · JPL
152109	2004 RE_{154}	—	September 10, 2004	Socorro	LINEAR	·	3.3 km	MPC · JPL
152110	2004 RS_{170}	—	September 8, 2004	Palomar	NEAT	EOS	3.5 km	MPC · JPL
152111	2004 RA_{182}	—	September 10, 2004	Socorro	LINEAR	CYB	7.7 km	MPC · JPL
152112	2004 RJ_{192}	—	September 10, 2004	Socorro	LINEAR	·	5.6 km	MPC · JPL
152113	2004 RG_{207}	—	September 11, 2004	Socorro	LINEAR	CYB	7.7 km	MPC · JPL
152114	2004 RV_{209}	—	September 11, 2004	Socorro	LINEAR	·	4.7 km	MPC · JPL
152115	2004 RB_{210}	—	September 11, 2004	Socorro	LINEAR	·	5.7 km	MPC · JPL
152116	2004 RU_{224}	—	September 9, 2004	Socorro	LINEAR	THM	3.5 km	MPC · JPL
152117	2004 RK_{242}	—	September 10, 2004	Kitt Peak	Spacewatch	·	3.8 km	MPC · JPL
152118	2004 RZ_{253}	—	September 6, 2004	Palomar	NEAT	EOS	3.3 km	MPC · JPL
152119	2004 RN_{255}	—	September 6, 2004	Palomar	NEAT	·	3.6 km	MPC · JPL
152120	2004 RL_{276}	—	September 13, 2004	Kitt Peak	Spacewatch	·	1.8 km	MPC · JPL
152121	2004 RA_{315}	—	September 15, 2004	Kitt Peak	Spacewatch	THM	3.6 km	MPC · JPL
152122	2004 RT_{318}	—	September 12, 2004	Kitt Peak	Spacewatch	T_{j} (2.99) · HIL · 3:2	8.8 km	MPC · JPL
152123	2004 SU_{13}	—	September 17, 2004	Socorro	LINEAR	·	2.9 km	MPC · JPL
152124	2004 SX_{20}	—	September 20, 2004	Siding Spring	SSS	T_{j} (2.95)	6.2 km	MPC · JPL
152125	2004 SR_{33}	—	September 17, 2004	Socorro	LINEAR	·	4.4 km	MPC · JPL
152126	2004 SU_{56}	—	September 16, 2004	Anderson Mesa	LONEOS	BRA	2.5 km	MPC · JPL
152127	2004 TL_{25}	—	October 4, 2004	Kitt Peak	Spacewatch	·	4.0 km	MPC · JPL
152128	2004 TF_{58}	—	October 5, 2004	Kitt Peak	Spacewatch	·	3.6 km	MPC · JPL
152129	2004 TL_{99}	—	October 5, 2004	Kitt Peak	Spacewatch	·	3.6 km	MPC · JPL
152130	2004 TZ_{116}	—	October 5, 2004	Palomar	NEAT	·	4.4 km	MPC · JPL
152131	2004 TW_{117}	—	October 5, 2004	Anderson Mesa	LONEOS	HYG	5.2 km	MPC · JPL
152132	2004 TG_{123}	—	October 7, 2004	Anderson Mesa	LONEOS	HIL · 3:2	11 km	MPC · JPL
152133	2004 TN_{126}	—	October 7, 2004	Socorro	LINEAR	3:2	8.2 km	MPC · JPL
152134	2004 TR_{129}	—	October 7, 2004	Socorro	LINEAR	VER	4.3 km	MPC · JPL
152135	2004 TC_{145}	—	October 4, 2004	Kitt Peak	Spacewatch	·	5.7 km	MPC · JPL
152136	2004 TW_{192}	—	October 7, 2004	Kitt Peak	Spacewatch	·	3.9 km	MPC · JPL
152137	2004 TE_{298}	—	October 12, 2004	Anderson Mesa	LONEOS	·	6.5 km	MPC · JPL
152138	2004 TU_{334}	—	October 10, 2004	Kitt Peak	Spacewatch	·	4.1 km	MPC · JPL
152139	2004 TA_{364}	—	October 10, 2004	Kitt Peak	Spacewatch	·	3.2 km	MPC · JPL
152140	2004 UO_{2}	—	October 18, 2004	Socorro	LINEAR	·	5.4 km	MPC · JPL
152141	2004 VZ_{61}	—	November 6, 2004	Socorro	LINEAR	·	8.0 km	MPC · JPL
152142	2005 JT	—	May 3, 2005	Socorro	LINEAR	·	2.1 km	MPC · JPL
152143	2005 JK_{3}	—	May 4, 2005	Anderson Mesa	LONEOS	MAS	960 m	MPC · JPL
152144	2005 JZ_{17}	—	May 4, 2005	Mount Lemmon	Mount Lemmon Survey	·	1.9 km	MPC · JPL
152145	2005 JW_{112}	—	May 9, 2005	Siding Spring	SSS	·	4.2 km	MPC · JPL
152146 Rosenlappin	2005 LJ_{15}	Rosenlappin	June 9, 2005	Jarnac	Jarnac	·	1.1 km	MPC · JPL
152147	2005 LD_{16}	—	June 5, 2005	Kitt Peak	Spacewatch	·	1.9 km	MPC · JPL
152148	2005 MH_{1}	—	June 17, 2005	Mount Lemmon	Mount Lemmon Survey	V	1.0 km	MPC · JPL
152149	2005 MN_{21}	—	June 30, 2005	Kitt Peak	Spacewatch	MAS	1.2 km	MPC · JPL
152150	2005 MS_{33}	—	June 29, 2005	Kitt Peak	Spacewatch	·	950 m	MPC · JPL
152151	2005 MC_{36}	—	June 30, 2005	Kitt Peak	Spacewatch	MAS	1.5 km	MPC · JPL
152152	2005 MY_{37}	—	June 30, 2005	Palomar	NEAT	ADE	2.8 km	MPC · JPL
152153	2005 MD_{39}	—	June 30, 2005	Kitt Peak	Spacewatch	·	2.0 km	MPC · JPL
152154	2005 MU_{44}	—	June 27, 2005	Kitt Peak	Spacewatch	·	2.8 km	MPC · JPL
152155	2005 MQ_{47}	—	June 29, 2005	Kitt Peak	Spacewatch	·	1.2 km	MPC · JPL
152156	2005 MV_{50}	—	June 30, 2005	Kitt Peak	Spacewatch	·	3.8 km	MPC · JPL
152157	2005 NF_{11}	—	July 3, 2005	Mount Lemmon	Mount Lemmon Survey	·	2.2 km	MPC · JPL
152158	2005 NY_{13}	—	July 5, 2005	Kitt Peak	Spacewatch	·	2.1 km	MPC · JPL
152159	2005 NE_{56}	—	July 10, 2005	Siding Spring	SSS	·	1.8 km	MPC · JPL
152160	2005 NX_{68}	—	July 3, 2005	Catalina	CSS	·	2.2 km	MPC · JPL
152161	2005 NH_{96}	—	July 7, 2005	Kitt Peak	Spacewatch	·	3.3 km	MPC · JPL
152162	2005 NQ_{96}	—	July 7, 2005	Anderson Mesa	LONEOS	·	1.3 km	MPC · JPL
152163	2005 NO_{97}	—	July 8, 2005	Anderson Mesa	LONEOS	·	2.2 km	MPC · JPL
152164	2005 NV_{100}	—	July 2, 2005	Catalina	CSS	·	1.9 km	MPC · JPL
152165	2005 OF	—	July 17, 2005	RAS	Lowe, A.	·	2.1 km	MPC · JPL
152166	2005 OY_{3}	—	July 26, 2005	Palomar	NEAT	HYG	3.9 km	MPC · JPL
152167	2005 OA_{4}	—	July 26, 2005	Palomar	NEAT	·	2.2 km	MPC · JPL
152168	2005 OL_{4}	—	July 27, 2005	Palomar	NEAT	·	1.9 km	MPC · JPL
152169	2005 OK_{5}	—	July 28, 2005	Palomar	NEAT	·	1.6 km	MPC · JPL
152170	2005 OM_{12}	—	July 29, 2005	Palomar	NEAT	·	2.2 km	MPC · JPL
152171	2005 OE_{14}	—	July 30, 2005	Palomar	NEAT	·	3.6 km	MPC · JPL
152172	2005 OO_{14}	—	July 31, 2005	Siding Spring	SSS	·	2.1 km	MPC · JPL
152173	2005 OH_{21}	—	July 28, 2005	Palomar	NEAT	·	1.7 km	MPC · JPL
152174	2005 OW_{22}	—	July 29, 2005	Palomar	NEAT	MAS	1.2 km	MPC · JPL
152175	2005 OL_{26}	—	July 29, 2005	Anderson Mesa	LONEOS	·	2.0 km	MPC · JPL
152176	2005 PO_{3}	—	August 6, 2005	Siding Spring	SSS	·	3.0 km	MPC · JPL
152177	2005 PD_{15}	—	August 4, 2005	Palomar	NEAT	(5)	1.7 km	MPC · JPL
152178	2005 QB_{4}	—	August 24, 2005	Palomar	NEAT	NYS	1.6 km	MPC · JPL
152179	2005 QJ_{4}	—	August 24, 2005	Palomar	NEAT	NYS	1.8 km	MPC · JPL
152180	2005 QP_{8}	—	August 25, 2005	Palomar	NEAT	·	4.8 km	MPC · JPL
152181	2005 QU_{8}	—	August 25, 2005	Palomar	NEAT	·	960 m	MPC · JPL
152182	2005 QZ_{8}	—	August 25, 2005	Palomar	NEAT	·	2.2 km	MPC · JPL
152183	2005 QK_{9}	—	August 25, 2005	Palomar	NEAT	·	1.6 km	MPC · JPL
152184	2005 QV_{11}	—	August 22, 2005	Palomar	NEAT	·	1.2 km	MPC · JPL
152185	2005 QY_{16}	—	August 25, 2005	Palomar	NEAT	·	1.0 km	MPC · JPL
152186	2005 QC_{27}	—	August 27, 2005	Kitt Peak	Spacewatch	·	1.7 km	MPC · JPL
152187	2005 QY_{32}	—	August 25, 2005	Palomar	NEAT	NYS	1.6 km	MPC · JPL
152188 Morricone	2005 QP_{51}	Morricone	August 27, 2005	CAOS	F. Mallia, A. Maury	EUN	2.1 km	MPC · JPL
152189	2005 QX_{55}	—	August 28, 2005	Kitt Peak	Spacewatch	MAS	1.0 km	MPC · JPL
152190	2005 QZ_{56}	—	August 29, 2005	Vicques	M. Ory	·	3.1 km	MPC · JPL
152191	2005 QP_{59}	—	August 25, 2005	Palomar	NEAT	·	2.2 km	MPC · JPL
152192	2005 QL_{60}	—	August 26, 2005	Anderson Mesa	LONEOS	526	3.3 km	MPC · JPL
152193	2005 QQ_{63}	—	August 26, 2005	Palomar	NEAT	·	1.9 km	MPC · JPL
152194	2005 QZ_{64}	—	August 26, 2005	Palomar	NEAT	·	3.8 km	MPC · JPL
152195	2005 QV_{79}	—	August 27, 2005	Anderson Mesa	LONEOS	·	3.1 km	MPC · JPL
152196	2005 QK_{85}	—	August 30, 2005	Socorro	LINEAR	(18466)	3.7 km	MPC · JPL
152197	2005 QY_{85}	—	August 30, 2005	Anderson Mesa	LONEOS	·	4.1 km	MPC · JPL
152198	2005 QN_{100}	—	August 27, 2005	Palomar	NEAT	·	2.7 km	MPC · JPL
152199	2005 QG_{104}	—	August 27, 2005	Palomar	NEAT	(5)	1.7 km	MPC · JPL
152200	2005 QD_{112}	—	August 27, 2005	Palomar	NEAT	·	1.4 km	MPC · JPL

== 152201–152300 ==
back to top

Designation			Discovery			Properties		Ref
Permanent	Provisional	Named after	Date	Site	Discoverer(s)	Category	Diam.	Ref
152201	2005 QA_{142}	—	August 30, 2005	Socorro	LINEAR	·	2.2 km	MPC · JPL
152202	2005 QE_{143}	—	August 31, 2005	Anderson Mesa	LONEOS	·	3.9 km	MPC · JPL
152203	2005 QD_{153}	—	August 27, 2005	Campo Imperatore	CINEOS	·	1.3 km	MPC · JPL
152204	2005 QQ_{154}	—	August 28, 2005	Anderson Mesa	LONEOS	·	2.3 km	MPC · JPL
152205	2005 QP_{155}	—	August 29, 2005	Socorro	LINEAR	NYS	2.2 km	MPC · JPL
152206	2005 QW_{168}	—	August 29, 2005	Palomar	NEAT	slow	3.8 km	MPC · JPL
152207	2005 QX_{168}	—	August 29, 2005	Palomar	NEAT	·	3.7 km	MPC · JPL
152208	2005 QS_{171}	—	August 29, 2005	Palomar	NEAT	HYG	4.3 km	MPC · JPL
152209	2005 QF_{173}	—	August 29, 2005	Palomar	NEAT	·	2.6 km	MPC · JPL
152210	2005 QH_{174}	—	August 31, 2005	Anderson Mesa	LONEOS	V	1.1 km	MPC · JPL
152211	2005 QH_{176}	—	August 31, 2005	Kitt Peak	Spacewatch	V	1.2 km	MPC · JPL
152212	2005 RG	—	September 1, 2005	Wrightwood	J. W. Young	V	1.1 km	MPC · JPL
152213	2005 RS_{5}	—	September 6, 2005	Anderson Mesa	LONEOS	·	2.1 km	MPC · JPL
152214	2005 RJ_{9}	—	September 2, 2005	Palomar	NEAT	·	3.7 km	MPC · JPL
152215	2005 RA_{10}	—	September 3, 2005	Palomar	NEAT	·	2.1 km	MPC · JPL
152216	2005 RH_{21}	—	September 3, 2005	Palomar	NEAT	(5)	1.5 km	MPC · JPL
152217	2005 RR_{22}	—	September 10, 2005	Andrushivka	Andrushivka	·	2.2 km	MPC · JPL
152218	2005 RQ_{23}	—	September 10, 2005	Anderson Mesa	LONEOS	·	3.3 km	MPC · JPL
152219	2005 RX_{23}	—	September 10, 2005	Anderson Mesa	LONEOS	V	1.3 km	MPC · JPL
152220	2005 RC_{25}	—	September 10, 2005	Anderson Mesa	LONEOS	·	4.1 km	MPC · JPL
152221	2005 RV_{27}	—	September 10, 2005	Anderson Mesa	LONEOS	·	1.7 km	MPC · JPL
152222	2005 RS_{28}	—	September 12, 2005	Socorro	LINEAR	T_{j} (2.99)	6.0 km	MPC · JPL
152223	2005 RF_{33}	—	September 14, 2005	Catalina	CSS	·	3.0 km	MPC · JPL
152224	2005 SJ	—	September 20, 2005	Reedy Creek	J. Broughton	(18466)	2.4 km	MPC · JPL
152225	2005 ST_{2}	—	September 23, 2005	Catalina	CSS	·	5.2 km	MPC · JPL
152226 Saracole	2005 SD_{3}	Saracole	September 23, 2005	Catalina	CSS	HYG	4.3 km	MPC · JPL
152227 Argoli	2005 SO_{4}	Argoli	September 24, 2005	Vallemare di Borbona	V. S. Casulli	·	2.1 km	MPC · JPL
152228	2005 SK_{9}	—	September 23, 2005	Kitt Peak	Spacewatch	·	6.2 km	MPC · JPL
152229	2005 SU_{12}	—	September 24, 2005	Kitt Peak	Spacewatch	·	2.9 km	MPC · JPL
152230	2005 SU_{13}	—	September 24, 2005	Kitt Peak	Spacewatch	·	2.4 km	MPC · JPL
152231	2005 SF_{15}	—	September 26, 2005	Kitt Peak	Spacewatch	·	2.2 km	MPC · JPL
152232	2005 SV_{17}	—	September 26, 2005	Kitt Peak	Spacewatch	THM	3.1 km	MPC · JPL
152233 Van Till	2005 SL_{19}	Van Till	September 25, 2005	Calvin-Rehoboth	Calvin College	THM	3.0 km	MPC · JPL
152234	2005 SU_{22}	—	September 23, 2005	Kitt Peak	Spacewatch	AGN	1.6 km	MPC · JPL
152235	2005 SK_{28}	—	September 23, 2005	Kitt Peak	Spacewatch	·	2.7 km	MPC · JPL
152236	2005 SQ_{43}	—	September 24, 2005	Kitt Peak	Spacewatch	·	2.3 km	MPC · JPL
152237	2005 SA_{51}	—	September 24, 2005	Kitt Peak	Spacewatch	EOS	3.2 km	MPC · JPL
152238	2005 SZ_{63}	—	September 26, 2005	Kitt Peak	Spacewatch	·	2.1 km	MPC · JPL
152239	2005 SJ_{68}	—	September 27, 2005	Kitt Peak	Spacewatch	·	3.0 km	MPC · JPL
152240	2005 SR_{69}	—	September 27, 2005	Socorro	LINEAR	·	6.3 km	MPC · JPL
152241	2005 SR_{70}	—	September 28, 2005	Palomar	NEAT	·	3.6 km	MPC · JPL
152242	2005 SX_{70}	—	September 28, 2005	Palomar	NEAT	·	2.0 km	MPC · JPL
152243	2005 SS_{76}	—	September 24, 2005	Kitt Peak	Spacewatch	·	1.2 km	MPC · JPL
152244	2005 SD_{88}	—	September 24, 2005	Goodricke-Pigott	R. A. Tucker	·	1.4 km	MPC · JPL
152245	2005 SH_{89}	—	September 24, 2005	Kitt Peak	Spacewatch	·	2.6 km	MPC · JPL
152246	2005 SO_{89}	—	September 24, 2005	Kitt Peak	Spacewatch	(11882)	2.8 km	MPC · JPL
152247	2005 SW_{90}	—	September 24, 2005	Kitt Peak	Spacewatch	NYS	1.8 km	MPC · JPL
152248	2005 SJ_{91}	—	September 24, 2005	Kitt Peak	Spacewatch	·	900 m	MPC · JPL
152249	2005 SF_{97}	—	September 25, 2005	Palomar	NEAT	·	2.6 km	MPC · JPL
152250	2005 SN_{98}	—	September 25, 2005	Kitt Peak	Spacewatch	·	1.1 km	MPC · JPL
152251	2005 SM_{100}	—	September 25, 2005	Kitt Peak	Spacewatch	·	1.4 km	MPC · JPL
152252	2005 SQ_{101}	—	September 25, 2005	Kitt Peak	Spacewatch	·	1.7 km	MPC · JPL
152253	2005 SQ_{114}	—	September 27, 2005	Kitt Peak	Spacewatch	·	1.3 km	MPC · JPL
152254	2005 SD_{116}	—	September 27, 2005	Kitt Peak	Spacewatch	KOR	1.7 km	MPC · JPL
152255	2005 SW_{116}	—	September 28, 2005	Palomar	NEAT	·	3.6 km	MPC · JPL
152256	2005 SU_{128}	—	September 29, 2005	Anderson Mesa	LONEOS	·	3.6 km	MPC · JPL
152257	2005 SJ_{129}	—	September 29, 2005	Mount Lemmon	Mount Lemmon Survey	KOR	1.9 km	MPC · JPL
152258	2005 SZ_{129}	—	September 29, 2005	Anderson Mesa	LONEOS	·	1.1 km	MPC · JPL
152259	2005 ST_{134}	—	September 29, 2005	Goodricke-Pigott	R. A. Tucker	·	3.3 km	MPC · JPL
152260	2005 SY_{141}	—	September 25, 2005	Kitt Peak	Spacewatch	HYG	3.6 km	MPC · JPL
152261	2005 SC_{146}	—	September 25, 2005	Kitt Peak	Spacewatch	·	1.1 km	MPC · JPL
152262	2005 SY_{148}	—	September 25, 2005	Kitt Peak	Spacewatch	EOS	3.5 km	MPC · JPL
152263	2005 SZ_{162}	—	September 27, 2005	Kitt Peak	Spacewatch	·	2.4 km	MPC · JPL
152264	2005 SL_{166}	—	September 28, 2005	Palomar	NEAT	·	3.3 km	MPC · JPL
152265	2005 SU_{173}	—	September 29, 2005	Palomar	NEAT	·	2.2 km	MPC · JPL
152266	2005 SV_{180}	—	September 29, 2005	Palomar	NEAT	·	1.1 km	MPC · JPL
152267	2005 SB_{191}	—	September 29, 2005	Anderson Mesa	LONEOS	·	2.7 km	MPC · JPL
152268	2005 SV_{193}	—	September 29, 2005	Kitt Peak	Spacewatch	·	2.9 km	MPC · JPL
152269	2005 SZ_{197}	—	September 30, 2005	Mount Lemmon	Mount Lemmon Survey	·	3.7 km	MPC · JPL
152270	2005 SC_{209}	—	September 30, 2005	Socorro	LINEAR	·	5.0 km	MPC · JPL
152271	2005 SP_{213}	—	September 30, 2005	Kitt Peak	Spacewatch	·	3.2 km	MPC · JPL
152272	2005 SK_{217}	—	September 30, 2005	Mount Lemmon	Mount Lemmon Survey	ADE	5.0 km	MPC · JPL
152273	2005 SL_{220}	—	September 29, 2005	Catalina	CSS	MAR	2.4 km	MPC · JPL
152274	2005 SD_{231}	—	September 30, 2005	Socorro	LINEAR	·	3.8 km	MPC · JPL
152275	2005 SV_{231}	—	September 30, 2005	Mount Lemmon	Mount Lemmon Survey	·	2.0 km	MPC · JPL
152276	2005 SF_{234}	—	September 29, 2005	Mount Lemmon	Mount Lemmon Survey	·	980 m	MPC · JPL
152277	2005 SO_{237}	—	September 29, 2005	Kitt Peak	Spacewatch	·	6.1 km	MPC · JPL
152278	2005 SQ_{255}	—	September 22, 2005	Palomar	NEAT	·	1.8 km	MPC · JPL
152279	2005 SS_{262}	—	September 23, 2005	Kitt Peak	Spacewatch	·	1.8 km	MPC · JPL
152280	2005 TE_{1}	—	October 1, 2005	Catalina	CSS	·	3.7 km	MPC · JPL
152281	2005 TT_{2}	—	October 1, 2005	Catalina	CSS	·	3.4 km	MPC · JPL
152282	2005 TH_{5}	—	October 1, 2005	Catalina	CSS	·	3.2 km	MPC · JPL
152283	2005 TK_{6}	—	October 1, 2005	Catalina	CSS	EOS	2.9 km	MPC · JPL
152284	2005 TP_{8}	—	October 1, 2005	Kitt Peak	Spacewatch	·	2.7 km	MPC · JPL
152285	2005 TJ_{10}	—	October 2, 2005	Palomar	NEAT	·	4.1 km	MPC · JPL
152286	2005 TL_{10}	—	October 2, 2005	Palomar	NEAT	AEG	5.2 km	MPC · JPL
152287	2005 TM_{11}	—	October 1, 2005	Socorro	LINEAR	·	4.7 km	MPC · JPL
152288	2005 TS_{12}	—	October 1, 2005	Anderson Mesa	LONEOS	MRX	1.7 km	MPC · JPL
152289	2005 TB_{18}	—	October 1, 2005	Socorro	LINEAR	·	3.2 km	MPC · JPL
152290 Lorettaoberheim	2005 TB_{23}	Lorettaoberheim	October 1, 2005	Catalina	CSS	·	2.4 km	MPC · JPL
152291	2005 TD_{24}	—	October 1, 2005	Mount Lemmon	Mount Lemmon Survey	·	4.9 km	MPC · JPL
152292	2005 TH_{28}	—	October 1, 2005	Anderson Mesa	LONEOS	·	4.7 km	MPC · JPL
152293	2005 TJ_{28}	—	October 1, 2005	Anderson Mesa	LONEOS	·	7.3 km	MPC · JPL
152294	2005 TX_{38}	—	October 1, 2005	Mount Lemmon	Mount Lemmon Survey	·	3.3 km	MPC · JPL
152295	2005 TX_{42}	—	October 4, 2005	Catalina	CSS	·	1.6 km	MPC · JPL
152296	2005 TE_{47}	—	October 3, 2005	Bergisch Gladbach	W. Bickel	·	3.4 km	MPC · JPL
152297	2005 TH_{49}	—	October 6, 2005	Mount Lemmon	Mount Lemmon Survey	L5	14 km	MPC · JPL
152298	2005 TV_{49}	—	October 9, 2005	Great Shefford	Birtwhistle, P.	·	1.8 km	MPC · JPL
152299 Vanautgaerden	2005 TQ_{50}	Vanautgaerden	October 11, 2005	Uccle	P. De Cat	·	2.0 km	MPC · JPL
152300	2005 TF_{51}	—	October 11, 2005	Uccle	T. Pauwels	·	2.4 km	MPC · JPL

== 152301–152400 ==
back to top

Designation			Discovery			Properties		Ref
Permanent	Provisional	Named after	Date	Site	Discoverer(s)	Category	Diam.	Ref
152301	2005 TN_{57}	—	October 1, 2005	Mount Lemmon	Mount Lemmon Survey	·	2.1 km	MPC · JPL
152302	2005 TF_{73}	—	October 5, 2005	Catalina	CSS	·	3.7 km	MPC · JPL
152303	2005 TG_{73}	—	October 5, 2005	Catalina	CSS	·	5.5 km	MPC · JPL
152304	2005 TK_{73}	—	October 6, 2005	Catalina	CSS	·	4.9 km	MPC · JPL
152305	2005 TN_{73}	—	October 6, 2005	Catalina	CSS	ADE	3.8 km	MPC · JPL
152306	2005 TP_{73}	—	October 7, 2005	Anderson Mesa	LONEOS	·	2.5 km	MPC · JPL
152307	2005 TL_{74}	—	October 7, 2005	Anderson Mesa	LONEOS	·	7.2 km	MPC · JPL
152308	2005 TW_{74}	—	October 1, 2005	Catalina	CSS	·	4.3 km	MPC · JPL
152309	2005 TS_{95}	—	October 6, 2005	Catalina	CSS	·	2.0 km	MPC · JPL
152310	2005 TJ_{125}	—	October 7, 2005	Kitt Peak	Spacewatch	V	780 m	MPC · JPL
152311	2005 TU_{132}	—	October 7, 2005	Kitt Peak	Spacewatch	·	1.8 km	MPC · JPL
152312	2005 TL_{141}	—	October 8, 2005	Kitt Peak	Spacewatch	·	1.5 km	MPC · JPL
152313	2005 TQ_{148}	—	October 8, 2005	Kitt Peak	Spacewatch	(883)	1.3 km	MPC · JPL
152314	2005 TF_{153}	—	October 7, 2005	Catalina	CSS	·	2.3 km	MPC · JPL
152315	2005 TT_{164}	—	October 9, 2005	Kitt Peak	Spacewatch	·	990 m	MPC · JPL
152316	2005 TF_{172}	—	October 11, 2005	Anderson Mesa	LONEOS	PHO	1.8 km	MPC · JPL
152317	2005 TW_{176}	—	October 1, 2005	Anderson Mesa	LONEOS	·	5.1 km	MPC · JPL
152318	2005 TQ_{183}	—	October 7, 2005	Anderson Mesa	LONEOS	·	4.5 km	MPC · JPL
152319 Pynchon	2005 UH_{7}	Pynchon	October 29, 2005	RAS	Guido, E.	·	2.2 km	MPC · JPL
152320 Lichtenknecker	2005 UD_{8}	Lichtenknecker	October 27, 2005	Ottmarsheim	C. Rinner	·	5.1 km	MPC · JPL
152321	2005 US_{8}	—	October 20, 2005	Palomar	NEAT	·	2.3 km	MPC · JPL
152322	2005 UP_{10}	—	October 21, 2005	Palomar	NEAT	EOS	2.8 km	MPC · JPL
152323	2005 UZ_{11}	—	October 22, 2005	Kitt Peak	Spacewatch	EOS	3.7 km	MPC · JPL
152324	2005 UO_{17}	—	October 22, 2005	Kitt Peak	Spacewatch	·	2.8 km	MPC · JPL
152325	2005 UT_{17}	—	October 22, 2005	Kitt Peak	Spacewatch	·	2.9 km	MPC · JPL
152326	2005 UJ_{18}	—	October 22, 2005	Catalina	CSS	·	2.7 km	MPC · JPL
152327	2005 UV_{18}	—	October 22, 2005	Kitt Peak	Spacewatch	·	7.0 km	MPC · JPL
152328	2005 UM_{20}	—	October 22, 2005	Catalina	CSS	3:2	8.3 km	MPC · JPL
152329	2005 UR_{24}	—	October 23, 2005	Kitt Peak	Spacewatch	HOF	4.5 km	MPC · JPL
152330	2005 UT_{26}	—	October 23, 2005	Catalina	CSS	·	2.7 km	MPC · JPL
152331	2005 UW_{29}	—	October 23, 2005	Catalina	CSS	CYB	6.8 km	MPC · JPL
152332	2005 UC_{30}	—	October 23, 2005	Catalina	CSS	·	5.7 km	MPC · JPL
152333	2005 UC_{35}	—	October 24, 2005	Kitt Peak	Spacewatch	·	3.2 km	MPC · JPL
152334	2005 UC_{37}	—	October 24, 2005	Kitt Peak	Spacewatch	·	4.5 km	MPC · JPL
152335	2005 UZ_{42}	—	October 22, 2005	Kitt Peak	Spacewatch	·	5.7 km	MPC · JPL
152336 Nicolecarr	2005 UN_{51}	Nicolecarr	October 23, 2005	Catalina	CSS	·	7.8 km	MPC · JPL
152337 Sakeenaburson	2005 UO_{55}	Sakeenaburson	October 23, 2005	Catalina	CSS	THM	3.4 km	MPC · JPL
152338	2005 UK_{61}	—	October 25, 2005	Catalina	CSS	·	3.5 km	MPC · JPL
152339	2005 UU_{61}	—	October 25, 2005	Mount Lemmon	Mount Lemmon Survey	·	3.1 km	MPC · JPL
152340	2005 UN_{63}	—	October 25, 2005	Mount Lemmon	Mount Lemmon Survey	·	2.1 km	MPC · JPL
152341 Rupesnigra	2005 UE_{67}	Rupesnigra	October 22, 2005	Catalina	CSS	·	3.9 km	MPC · JPL
152342	2005 UP_{73}	—	October 23, 2005	Palomar	NEAT	KOR	2.3 km	MPC · JPL
152343	2005 UW_{73}	—	October 23, 2005	Palomar	NEAT	NEM	4.3 km	MPC · JPL
152344	2005 UY_{75}	—	October 24, 2005	Palomar	NEAT	·	2.6 km	MPC · JPL
152345	2005 UO_{79}	—	October 25, 2005	Catalina	CSS	·	2.6 km	MPC · JPL
152346	2005 UY_{79}	—	October 25, 2005	Kitt Peak	Spacewatch	·	2.9 km	MPC · JPL
152347	2005 UC_{83}	—	October 22, 2005	Kitt Peak	Spacewatch	·	2.1 km	MPC · JPL
152348	2005 UD_{83}	—	October 22, 2005	Kitt Peak	Spacewatch	MAS	1.1 km	MPC · JPL
152349	2005 UK_{84}	—	October 22, 2005	Kitt Peak	Spacewatch	·	1.8 km	MPC · JPL
152350	2005 UN_{87}	—	October 22, 2005	Kitt Peak	Spacewatch	AST	2.2 km	MPC · JPL
152351	2005 UD_{97}	—	October 22, 2005	Kitt Peak	Spacewatch	·	2.1 km	MPC · JPL
152352	2005 UZ_{112}	—	October 22, 2005	Kitt Peak	Spacewatch	·	3.6 km	MPC · JPL
152353	2005 UZ_{114}	—	October 22, 2005	Palomar	NEAT	·	5.8 km	MPC · JPL
152354	2005 UZ_{116}	—	October 23, 2005	Catalina	CSS	·	2.6 km	MPC · JPL
152355	2005 UC_{117}	—	October 23, 2005	Kitt Peak	Spacewatch	KOR	1.9 km	MPC · JPL
152356	2005 UO_{121}	—	October 24, 2005	Kitt Peak	Spacewatch	·	2.3 km	MPC · JPL
152357	2005 UE_{125}	—	October 24, 2005	Kitt Peak	Spacewatch	NYS	1.8 km	MPC · JPL
152358	2005 UG_{126}	—	October 24, 2005	Kitt Peak	Spacewatch	(12739)	2.5 km	MPC · JPL
152359	2005 UM_{129}	—	October 24, 2005	Kitt Peak	Spacewatch	·	3.7 km	MPC · JPL
152360	2005 UM_{130}	—	October 24, 2005	Palomar	NEAT	·	5.3 km	MPC · JPL
152361	2005 UX_{140}	—	October 25, 2005	Mount Lemmon	Mount Lemmon Survey	·	4.1 km	MPC · JPL
152362	2005 UD_{141}	—	October 25, 2005	Catalina	CSS	·	4.5 km	MPC · JPL
152363	2005 US_{141}	—	October 25, 2005	Catalina	CSS	EOS	4.4 km	MPC · JPL
152364	2005 UK_{142}	—	October 25, 2005	Catalina	CSS	·	4.5 km	MPC · JPL
152365	2005 UK_{143}	—	October 25, 2005	Catalina	CSS	·	4.1 km	MPC · JPL
152366	2005 UW_{150}	—	October 26, 2005	Kitt Peak	Spacewatch	·	3.9 km	MPC · JPL
152367	2005 UN_{155}	—	October 26, 2005	Anderson Mesa	LONEOS	·	3.8 km	MPC · JPL
152368	2005 UM_{158}	—	October 28, 2005	Goodricke-Pigott	R. A. Tucker	·	4.6 km	MPC · JPL
152369	2005 UO_{159}	—	October 21, 2005	Palomar	NEAT	·	2.7 km	MPC · JPL
152370	2005 UZ_{159}	—	October 22, 2005	Catalina	CSS	·	3.1 km	MPC · JPL
152371	2005 UN_{162}	—	October 27, 2005	Anderson Mesa	LONEOS	·	3.5 km	MPC · JPL
152372	2005 UT_{169}	—	October 24, 2005	Kitt Peak	Spacewatch	(11882)	2.5 km	MPC · JPL
152373	2005 UG_{171}	—	October 24, 2005	Kitt Peak	Spacewatch	3:2	6.4 km	MPC · JPL
152374	2005 UH_{173}	—	October 24, 2005	Kitt Peak	Spacewatch	·	1.5 km	MPC · JPL
152375	2005 UW_{173}	—	October 24, 2005	Kitt Peak	Spacewatch	KOR	1.7 km	MPC · JPL
152376	2005 UO_{180}	—	October 24, 2005	Kitt Peak	Spacewatch	HYG	4.5 km	MPC · JPL
152377	2005 UT_{182}	—	October 24, 2005	Kitt Peak	Spacewatch	·	2.5 km	MPC · JPL
152378	2005 UK_{184}	—	October 25, 2005	Mount Lemmon	Mount Lemmon Survey	·	3.2 km	MPC · JPL
152379	2005 UW_{184}	—	October 25, 2005	Mount Lemmon	Mount Lemmon Survey	AST	2.6 km	MPC · JPL
152380	2005 UB_{202}	—	October 25, 2005	Kitt Peak	Spacewatch	·	2.8 km	MPC · JPL
152381	2005 UK_{205}	—	October 26, 2005	Kitt Peak	Spacewatch	·	2.5 km	MPC · JPL
152382	2005 UO_{205}	—	October 26, 2005	Kitt Peak	Spacewatch	·	2.4 km	MPC · JPL
152383	2005 UW_{205}	—	October 26, 2005	Kitt Peak	Spacewatch	·	2.7 km	MPC · JPL
152384	2005 UH_{206}	—	October 27, 2005	Kitt Peak	Spacewatch	·	2.6 km	MPC · JPL
152385	2005 UE_{216}	—	October 25, 2005	Kitt Peak	Spacewatch	·	3.5 km	MPC · JPL
152386	2005 UB_{217}	—	October 27, 2005	Kitt Peak	Spacewatch	·	3.2 km	MPC · JPL
152387	2005 UD_{226}	—	October 25, 2005	Kitt Peak	Spacewatch	·	2.7 km	MPC · JPL
152388	2005 UF_{226}	—	October 25, 2005	Kitt Peak	Spacewatch	·	2.5 km	MPC · JPL
152389	2005 US_{228}	—	October 25, 2005	Kitt Peak	Spacewatch	·	1.7 km	MPC · JPL
152390	2005 UJ_{237}	—	October 25, 2005	Kitt Peak	Spacewatch	·	2.5 km	MPC · JPL
152391	2005 UU_{243}	—	October 25, 2005	Kitt Peak	Spacewatch	·	5.4 km	MPC · JPL
152392	2005 UH_{245}	—	October 25, 2005	Kitt Peak	Spacewatch	·	4.1 km	MPC · JPL
152393	2005 UL_{245}	—	October 25, 2005	Kitt Peak	Spacewatch	EOS	3.1 km	MPC · JPL
152394	2005 UN_{250}	—	October 23, 2005	Catalina	CSS	EOS	2.6 km	MPC · JPL
152395	2005 UJ_{253}	—	October 27, 2005	Kitt Peak	Spacewatch	·	2.1 km	MPC · JPL
152396	2005 UB_{270}	—	October 28, 2005	Socorro	LINEAR	·	2.5 km	MPC · JPL
152397	2005 UC_{271}	—	October 28, 2005	Socorro	LINEAR	·	4.3 km	MPC · JPL
152398	2005 UP_{282}	—	October 26, 2005	Kitt Peak	Spacewatch	MRX	1.8 km	MPC · JPL
152399	2005 UT_{287}	—	October 26, 2005	Kitt Peak	Spacewatch	KOR	1.8 km	MPC · JPL
152400	2005 UN_{293}	—	October 26, 2005	Kitt Peak	Spacewatch	·	2.0 km	MPC · JPL

== 152401–152500 ==
back to top

Designation			Discovery			Properties		Ref
Permanent	Provisional	Named after	Date	Site	Discoverer(s)	Category	Diam.	Ref
152401	2005 UQ_{294}	—	October 26, 2005	Kitt Peak	Spacewatch	·	2.8 km	MPC · JPL
152402	2005 US_{299}	—	October 26, 2005	Kitt Peak	Spacewatch	·	2.6 km	MPC · JPL
152403	2005 UT_{307}	—	October 27, 2005	Mount Lemmon	Mount Lemmon Survey	·	2.5 km	MPC · JPL
152404	2005 UE_{313}	—	October 29, 2005	Catalina	CSS	EOS	5.7 km	MPC · JPL
152405	2005 UF_{316}	—	October 25, 2005	Mount Lemmon	Mount Lemmon Survey	·	1.8 km	MPC · JPL
152406	2005 UM_{319}	—	October 27, 2005	Kitt Peak	Spacewatch	·	2.0 km	MPC · JPL
152407	2005 UD_{322}	—	October 27, 2005	Kitt Peak	Spacewatch	AGN	1.8 km	MPC · JPL
152408	2005 US_{322}	—	October 28, 2005	Catalina	CSS	·	4.5 km	MPC · JPL
152409	2005 US_{323}	—	October 28, 2005	Socorro	LINEAR	·	5.6 km	MPC · JPL
152410	2005 UY_{333}	—	October 29, 2005	Mount Lemmon	Mount Lemmon Survey	·	2.4 km	MPC · JPL
152411	2005 UE_{340}	—	October 31, 2005	Kitt Peak	Spacewatch	·	2.6 km	MPC · JPL
152412	2005 UA_{343}	—	October 31, 2005	Catalina	CSS	·	5.5 km	MPC · JPL
152413	2005 UG_{345}	—	October 29, 2005	Mount Lemmon	Mount Lemmon Survey	AGN	1.8 km	MPC · JPL
152414	2005 UW_{349}	—	October 27, 2005	Palomar	NEAT	·	7.2 km	MPC · JPL
152415	2005 UT_{357}	—	October 31, 2005	Mount Lemmon	Mount Lemmon Survey	·	3.2 km	MPC · JPL
152416	2005 UW_{365}	—	October 27, 2005	Kitt Peak	Spacewatch	·	1.4 km	MPC · JPL
152417	2005 UX_{373}	—	October 27, 2005	Kitt Peak	Spacewatch	·	1.2 km	MPC · JPL
152418	2005 UX_{381}	—	October 25, 2005	Socorro	LINEAR	·	5.5 km	MPC · JPL
152419	2005 UG_{382}	—	October 26, 2005	Socorro	LINEAR	·	5.6 km	MPC · JPL
152420	2005 UH_{383}	—	October 27, 2005	Socorro	LINEAR	·	9.0 km	MPC · JPL
152421	2005 UK_{384}	—	October 27, 2005	Catalina	CSS	MAR	1.8 km	MPC · JPL
152422	2005 UE_{386}	—	October 30, 2005	Socorro	LINEAR	·	3.0 km	MPC · JPL
152423	2005 UK_{386}	—	October 30, 2005	Catalina	CSS	·	2.3 km	MPC · JPL
152424	2005 UJ_{393}	—	October 27, 2005	Anderson Mesa	LONEOS	·	6.8 km	MPC · JPL
152425	2005 UL_{396}	—	October 26, 2005	Palomar	NEAT	·	3.2 km	MPC · JPL
152426	2005 UW_{396}	—	October 27, 2005	Catalina	CSS	·	2.5 km	MPC · JPL
152427	2005 UM_{397}	—	October 28, 2005	Socorro	LINEAR	MAR	2.0 km	MPC · JPL
152428	2005 UY_{397}	—	October 30, 2005	Catalina	CSS	·	4.9 km	MPC · JPL
152429	2005 UO_{398}	—	October 30, 2005	Kitt Peak	Spacewatch	·	2.7 km	MPC · JPL
152430	2005 UX_{406}	—	October 30, 2005	Mount Lemmon	Mount Lemmon Survey	KOR	1.6 km	MPC · JPL
152431	2005 UV_{408}	—	October 31, 2005	Mount Lemmon	Mount Lemmon Survey	MIS	4.1 km	MPC · JPL
152432	2005 UZ_{414}	—	October 25, 2005	Kitt Peak	Spacewatch	THM	4.3 km	MPC · JPL
152433	2005 UO_{438}	—	October 28, 2005	Kitt Peak	Spacewatch	MAS	910 m	MPC · JPL
152434	2005 UV_{438}	—	October 28, 2005	Kitt Peak	Spacewatch	slow	3.5 km	MPC · JPL
152435	2005 UJ_{439}	—	October 29, 2005	Catalina	CSS	·	5.6 km	MPC · JPL
152436	2005 UA_{440}	—	October 29, 2005	Catalina	CSS	·	5.6 km	MPC · JPL
152437	2005 UM_{442}	—	October 29, 2005	Palomar	NEAT	EUN	2.1 km	MPC · JPL
152438	2005 UO_{442}	—	October 29, 2005	Palomar	NEAT	·	3.5 km	MPC · JPL
152439	2005 UP_{446}	—	October 29, 2005	Catalina	CSS	NAE	5.4 km	MPC · JPL
152440	2005 UN_{447}	—	October 29, 2005	Catalina	CSS	EOS	3.6 km	MPC · JPL
152441	2005 UE_{449}	—	October 30, 2005	Kitt Peak	Spacewatch	·	1.6 km	MPC · JPL
152442	2005 US_{455}	—	October 29, 2005	Catalina	CSS	·	4.8 km	MPC · JPL
152443	2005 UY_{460}	—	October 28, 2005	Mount Lemmon	Mount Lemmon Survey	KOR	2.4 km	MPC · JPL
152444	2005 UV_{468}	—	October 30, 2005	Kitt Peak	Spacewatch	·	4.9 km	MPC · JPL
152445	2005 UF_{473}	—	October 30, 2005	Mount Lemmon	Mount Lemmon Survey	·	3.3 km	MPC · JPL
152446	2005 UQ_{476}	—	October 24, 2005	Palomar	NEAT	EUN	2.2 km	MPC · JPL
152447	2005 US_{476}	—	October 24, 2005	Palomar	NEAT	·	2.0 km	MPC · JPL
152448	2005 UZ_{484}	—	October 22, 2005	Catalina	CSS	·	2.2 km	MPC · JPL
152449	2005 UK_{491}	—	October 24, 2005	Anderson Mesa	LONEOS	AGN	2.0 km	MPC · JPL
152450	2005 UK_{496}	—	October 26, 2005	Anderson Mesa	LONEOS	·	4.4 km	MPC · JPL
152451	2005 UA_{501}	—	October 27, 2005	Catalina	CSS	·	2.6 km	MPC · JPL
152452	2005 UB_{501}	—	October 27, 2005	Catalina	CSS	·	3.2 km	MPC · JPL
152453	2005 UP_{501}	—	October 27, 2005	Catalina	CSS	EOS	2.9 km	MPC · JPL
152454 Darnyi	2005 VS_{2}	Darnyi	November 3, 2005	Piszkéstető	K. Sárneczky	·	1.3 km	MPC · JPL
152455	2005 VN_{7}	—	November 11, 2005	RAS	Hutsebaut, R.	EOS	3.1 km	MPC · JPL
152456	2005 VF_{8}	—	November 1, 2005	Kitt Peak	Spacewatch	·	2.6 km	MPC · JPL
152457	2005 VT_{13}	—	November 3, 2005	Catalina	CSS	·	1.4 km	MPC · JPL
152458	2005 VY_{13}	—	November 3, 2005	Catalina	CSS	·	3.4 km	MPC · JPL
152459	2005 VG_{15}	—	November 1, 2005	Anderson Mesa	LONEOS	TIR	5.7 km	MPC · JPL
152460	2005 VY_{16}	—	November 3, 2005	Socorro	LINEAR	·	2.2 km	MPC · JPL
152461	2005 VL_{43}	—	November 5, 2005	Socorro	LINEAR	·	3.7 km	MPC · JPL
152462	2005 VF_{71}	—	November 1, 2005	Mount Lemmon	Mount Lemmon Survey	·	4.1 km	MPC · JPL
152463	2005 VE_{77}	—	November 4, 2005	Socorro	LINEAR	·	3.8 km	MPC · JPL
152464	2005 VD_{81}	—	November 5, 2005	Kitt Peak	Spacewatch	·	3.3 km	MPC · JPL
152465	2005 VJ_{96}	—	November 7, 2005	Socorro	LINEAR	·	2.9 km	MPC · JPL
152466	2005 VJ_{106}	—	November 1, 2005	Socorro	LINEAR	THM	4.5 km	MPC · JPL
152467	2005 VC_{114}	—	November 10, 2005	Mount Lemmon	Mount Lemmon Survey	·	1.8 km	MPC · JPL
152468	2005 VN_{114}	—	November 10, 2005	Eskridge	Farpoint	·	2.3 km	MPC · JPL
152469	2005 VG_{124}	—	November 6, 2005	Mount Lemmon	Mount Lemmon Survey	EUN	2.1 km	MPC · JPL
152470	2005 WJ	—	November 19, 2005	RAS	Lowe, A.	·	3.7 km	MPC · JPL
152471	2005 WE_{1}	—	November 21, 2005	Wrightwood	J. W. Young	·	4.0 km	MPC · JPL
152472 Brendlé	2005 WZ_{3}	Brendlé	November 23, 2005	Ottmarsheim	C. Rinner	·	4.1 km	MPC · JPL
152473	2005 WS_{4}	—	November 20, 2005	Catalina	CSS	EOS	3.1 km	MPC · JPL
152474	2005 WY_{5}	—	November 21, 2005	Anderson Mesa	LONEOS	EOS	4.2 km	MPC · JPL
152475	2005 WD_{10}	—	November 21, 2005	Catalina	CSS	AST	3.0 km	MPC · JPL
152476	2005 WH_{19}	—	November 24, 2005	Palomar	NEAT	·	3.7 km	MPC · JPL
152477	2005 WE_{25}	—	November 21, 2005	Kitt Peak	Spacewatch	AGN	1.7 km	MPC · JPL
152478	2005 WP_{30}	—	November 21, 2005	Kitt Peak	Spacewatch	·	6.4 km	MPC · JPL
152479	2005 WF_{33}	—	November 21, 2005	Catalina	CSS	·	5.1 km	MPC · JPL
152480	2005 WB_{56}	—	November 25, 2005	Mount Lemmon	Mount Lemmon Survey	EOS	3.3 km	MPC · JPL
152481 Stabia	2005 WY_{57}	Stabia	November 30, 2005	RAS	Guido, E.	·	6.9 km	MPC · JPL
152482	2005 WG_{59}	—	November 21, 2005	Anderson Mesa	LONEOS	·	3.3 km	MPC · JPL
152483	2005 WV_{59}	—	November 25, 2005	Palomar	NEAT	·	6.4 km	MPC · JPL
152484	2005 WX_{59}	—	November 26, 2005	Catalina	CSS	·	3.5 km	MPC · JPL
152485	2005 WD_{64}	—	November 25, 2005	Mount Lemmon	Mount Lemmon Survey	·	2.9 km	MPC · JPL
152486	2005 WJ_{74}	—	November 27, 2005	Anderson Mesa	LONEOS	·	3.4 km	MPC · JPL
152487	2005 WD_{77}	—	November 25, 2005	Kitt Peak	Spacewatch	KOR	1.9 km	MPC · JPL
152488	2005 WA_{79}	—	November 25, 2005	Kitt Peak	Spacewatch	(1118)	8.8 km	MPC · JPL
152489	2005 WE_{89}	—	November 25, 2005	Mount Lemmon	Mount Lemmon Survey	·	4.2 km	MPC · JPL
152490	2005 WX_{89}	—	November 26, 2005	Catalina	CSS	·	3.1 km	MPC · JPL
152491	2005 WX_{90}	—	November 28, 2005	Catalina	CSS	HYG	6.6 km	MPC · JPL
152492	2005 WM_{91}	—	November 28, 2005	Catalina	CSS	·	3.7 km	MPC · JPL
152493	2005 WE_{92}	—	November 25, 2005	Mount Lemmon	Mount Lemmon Survey	THM	3.4 km	MPC · JPL
152494	2005 WK_{100}	—	November 28, 2005	Catalina	CSS	EOS	3.8 km	MPC · JPL
152495	2005 WH_{104}	—	November 28, 2005	Catalina	CSS	·	2.7 km	MPC · JPL
152496	2005 WA_{106}	—	November 29, 2005	Catalina	CSS	·	5.3 km	MPC · JPL
152497	2005 WJ_{120}	—	November 29, 2005	Mount Lemmon	Mount Lemmon Survey	·	3.4 km	MPC · JPL
152498	2005 WS_{123}	—	November 25, 2005	Mount Lemmon	Mount Lemmon Survey	·	1.9 km	MPC · JPL
152499	2005 WO_{155}	—	November 29, 2005	Palomar	NEAT	·	1.1 km	MPC · JPL
152500	2005 WX_{165}	—	November 29, 2005	Mount Lemmon	Mount Lemmon Survey	·	3.3 km	MPC · JPL

== 152501–152600 ==
back to top

Designation			Discovery			Properties		Ref
Permanent	Provisional	Named after	Date	Site	Discoverer(s)	Category	Diam.	Ref
152501	2005 WD_{168}	—	November 30, 2005	Kitt Peak	Spacewatch	THM	3.8 km	MPC · JPL
152502	2005 WO_{181}	—	November 25, 2005	Catalina	CSS	EOS	3.0 km	MPC · JPL
152503	2005 WW_{182}	—	November 26, 2005	Catalina	CSS	·	3.2 km	MPC · JPL
152504	2005 WS_{184}	—	November 29, 2005	Palomar	NEAT	·	3.7 km	MPC · JPL
152505	2005 WD_{185}	—	November 29, 2005	Palomar	NEAT	·	1.7 km	MPC · JPL
152506	2005 XN_{1}	—	December 4, 2005	Junk Bond	D. Healy	THM	3.7 km	MPC · JPL
152507	2005 XZ_{3}	—	December 1, 2005	Mount Lemmon	Mount Lemmon Survey	·	3.4 km	MPC · JPL
152508	2005 XZ_{4}	—	December 5, 2005	RAS	Lowe, A.	·	3.1 km	MPC · JPL
152509	2005 XE_{39}	—	December 5, 2005	Mount Lemmon	Mount Lemmon Survey	·	1.5 km	MPC · JPL
152510	2005 XA_{64}	—	December 6, 2005	Socorro	LINEAR	·	4.4 km	MPC · JPL
152511	2005 YC_{1}	—	December 21, 2005	Kitt Peak	Spacewatch	(5)	1.4 km	MPC · JPL
152512	2005 YF_{1}	—	December 21, 2005	Catalina	CSS	LUT	7.2 km	MPC · JPL
152513	2005 YQ_{49}	—	December 23, 2005	Kitt Peak	Spacewatch	·	4.1 km	MPC · JPL
152514	2005 YJ_{137}	—	December 26, 2005	Kitt Peak	Spacewatch	THM	3.5 km	MPC · JPL
152515	2005 YO_{186}	—	December 29, 2005	Socorro	LINEAR	EOS	5.1 km	MPC · JPL
152516	2006 AG_{70}	—	January 6, 2006	Kitt Peak	Spacewatch	·	3.3 km	MPC · JPL
152517	2006 AD_{72}	—	January 6, 2006	Kitt Peak	Spacewatch	L5	10 km	MPC · JPL
152518	2006 BH_{47}	—	January 25, 2006	Mount Lemmon	Mount Lemmon Survey	·	3.2 km	MPC · JPL
152519	2006 CT_{61}	—	February 3, 2006	Anderson Mesa	LONEOS	L5	16 km	MPC · JPL
152520	2006 GQ_{47}	—	April 9, 2006	Kitt Peak	Spacewatch	·	3.2 km	MPC · JPL
152521	2006 KU_{1}	—	May 21, 2006	RAS	Lowe, A.	DOR	3.9 km	MPC · JPL
152522	2006 SQ_{48}	—	September 17, 2006	Socorro	LINEAR	·	1.6 km	MPC · JPL
152523	2006 UH_{55}	—	October 17, 2006	Kitt Peak	Spacewatch	·	2.5 km	MPC · JPL
152524	2006 UZ_{67}	—	October 16, 2006	Catalina	CSS	·	2.3 km	MPC · JPL
152525	2006 VU_{54}	—	November 11, 2006	Kitt Peak	Spacewatch	·	2.5 km	MPC · JPL
152526	2006 VG_{58}	—	November 11, 2006	Kitt Peak	Spacewatch	·	1.4 km	MPC · JPL
152527	2006 VC_{62}	—	November 11, 2006	Kitt Peak	Spacewatch	·	4.2 km	MPC · JPL
152528	2006 VU_{124}	—	November 14, 2006	Socorro	LINEAR	CYB	6.1 km	MPC · JPL
152529	2006 XS_{6}	—	December 9, 2006	Kitt Peak	Spacewatch	GEF	2.1 km	MPC · JPL
152530	2006 YY_{14}	—	December 16, 2006	Mount Lemmon	Mount Lemmon Survey	·	2.2 km	MPC · JPL
152531	2006 YY_{47}	—	December 24, 2006	Catalina	CSS	·	1.2 km	MPC · JPL
152532	2007 AP_{20}	—	January 10, 2007	Catalina	CSS	·	6.0 km	MPC · JPL
152533 Aggas	2007 AL_{26}	Aggas	January 8, 2007	Mount Lemmon	Mount Lemmon Survey	·	1.3 km	MPC · JPL
152534	2007 BZ_{7}	—	January 24, 2007	RAS	Lowe, A.	·	2.2 km	MPC · JPL
152535	2007 BR_{8}	—	January 16, 2007	Catalina	CSS	H	1.0 km	MPC · JPL
152536	4265 P-L	—	September 24, 1960	Palomar	C. J. van Houten, I. van Houten-Groeneveld, T. Gehrels	·	2.6 km	MPC · JPL
152537	2056 T-1	—	March 25, 1971	Palomar	C. J. van Houten, I. van Houten-Groeneveld, T. Gehrels	·	5.4 km	MPC · JPL
152538	3035 T-1	—	March 26, 1971	Palomar	C. J. van Houten, I. van Houten-Groeneveld, T. Gehrels	·	3.4 km	MPC · JPL
152539	3194 T-1	—	March 26, 1971	Palomar	C. J. van Houten, I. van Houten-Groeneveld, T. Gehrels	·	1.7 km	MPC · JPL
152540	4358 T-1	—	March 26, 1971	Palomar	C. J. van Houten, I. van Houten-Groeneveld, T. Gehrels	·	2.2 km	MPC · JPL
152541	1140 T-2	—	September 29, 1973	Palomar	C. J. van Houten, I. van Houten-Groeneveld, T. Gehrels	NYS	1.3 km	MPC · JPL
152542	3135 T-2	—	September 30, 1973	Palomar	C. J. van Houten, I. van Houten-Groeneveld, T. Gehrels	·	2.9 km	MPC · JPL
152543	3420 T-2	—	September 30, 1973	Palomar	C. J. van Houten, I. van Houten-Groeneveld, T. Gehrels	·	3.7 km	MPC · JPL
152544	4427 T-2	—	September 30, 1973	Palomar	C. J. van Houten, I. van Houten-Groeneveld, T. Gehrels	·	1.3 km	MPC · JPL
152545	4473 T-2	—	September 30, 1973	Palomar	C. J. van Houten, I. van Houten-Groeneveld, T. Gehrels	·	1.4 km	MPC · JPL
152546	4729 T-2	—	September 30, 1973	Palomar	C. J. van Houten, I. van Houten-Groeneveld, T. Gehrels	·	1.7 km	MPC · JPL
152547	5052 T-2	—	September 25, 1973	Palomar	C. J. van Houten, I. van Houten-Groeneveld, T. Gehrels	·	3.4 km	MPC · JPL
152548	5085 T-2	—	September 25, 1973	Palomar	C. J. van Houten, I. van Houten-Groeneveld, T. Gehrels	·	1.6 km	MPC · JPL
152549	1119 T-3	—	October 17, 1977	Palomar	C. J. van Houten, I. van Houten-Groeneveld, T. Gehrels	THB	4.7 km	MPC · JPL
152550	2677 T-3	—	October 11, 1977	Palomar	C. J. van Houten, I. van Houten-Groeneveld, T. Gehrels	·	1.7 km	MPC · JPL
152551	3190 T-3	—	October 16, 1977	Palomar	C. J. van Houten, I. van Houten-Groeneveld, T. Gehrels	·	1.4 km	MPC · JPL
152552	3810 T-3	—	October 16, 1977	Palomar	C. J. van Houten, I. van Houten-Groeneveld, T. Gehrels	THM	3.2 km	MPC · JPL
152553	4264 T-3	—	October 16, 1977	Palomar	C. J. van Houten, I. van Houten-Groeneveld, T. Gehrels	·	4.2 km	MPC · JPL
152554	4320 T-3	—	October 16, 1977	Palomar	C. J. van Houten, I. van Houten-Groeneveld, T. Gehrels	·	2.9 km	MPC · JPL
152555	1975 SD_{1}	—	September 30, 1975	Palomar	S. J. Bus	·	5.5 km	MPC · JPL
152556	1980 FK_{4}	—	March 16, 1980	La Silla	C.-I. Lagerkvist	·	6.3 km	MPC · JPL
152557	1981 ED_{29}	—	March 1, 1981	Siding Spring	S. J. Bus	·	3.3 km	MPC · JPL
152558	1990 SA	—	September 16, 1990	Siding Spring	R. H. McNaught	AMO +1km	1.4 km	MPC · JPL
152559 Bodelschwingh	1990 TM_{13}	Bodelschwingh	October 12, 1990	Tautenburg Observatory	F. Börngen, L. D. Schmadel	·	3.5 km	MPC · JPL
152560	1991 BN	—	January 19, 1991	Kitt Peak	Spacewatch	APO · PHA	510 m	MPC · JPL
152561	1991 RB	—	September 4, 1991	Siding Spring	R. H. McNaught	APO · PHA	540 m	MPC · JPL
152562	1991 RO_{42}	—	September 13, 1991	Palomar	Lowe, A.	·	1.7 km	MPC · JPL
152563	1992 BF	—	January 30, 1992	Palomar	K. J. Lawrence, E. F. Helin	ATE	270 m	MPC · JPL
152564	1992 HF	—	April 24, 1992	Kitt Peak	Spacewatch	APO	280 m	MPC · JPL
152565	1992 SH_{11}	—	September 28, 1992	Kitt Peak	Spacewatch	·	890 m	MPC · JPL
152566	1993 FH_{17}	—	March 17, 1993	La Silla	UESAC	·	3.9 km	MPC · JPL
152567	1993 FF_{32}	—	March 19, 1993	La Silla	UESAC	·	4.9 km	MPC · JPL
152568	1993 FN_{33}	—	March 19, 1993	La Silla	UESAC	·	4.8 km	MPC · JPL
152569	1993 FH_{50}	—	March 19, 1993	La Silla	UESAC	·	1.4 km	MPC · JPL
152570	1993 FL_{69}	—	March 21, 1993	La Silla	UESAC	·	3.4 km	MPC · JPL
152571	1993 QG_{9}	—	August 20, 1993	La Silla	E. W. Elst	·	1.5 km	MPC · JPL
152572	1993 TE_{23}	—	October 9, 1993	La Silla	E. W. Elst	SUL	3.0 km	MPC · JPL
152573	1993 TG_{32}	—	October 9, 1993	La Silla	E. W. Elst	NYS	1.9 km	MPC · JPL
152574	1994 CR_{9}	—	February 7, 1994	La Silla	E. W. Elst	·	2.4 km	MPC · JPL
152575	1994 GY	—	April 14, 1994	Dynic	A. Sugie	AMO +1km	1.4 km	MPC · JPL
152576	1994 NR_{2}	—	July 11, 1994	La Silla	H. Debehogne, E. W. Elst	·	970 m	MPC · JPL
152577	1994 PA_{10}	—	August 10, 1994	La Silla	E. W. Elst	DOR	5.0 km	MPC · JPL
152578	1994 PU_{11}	—	August 10, 1994	La Silla	E. W. Elst	EOS	3.5 km	MPC · JPL
152579	1994 PJ_{37}	—	August 10, 1994	La Silla	E. W. Elst	·	1.8 km	MPC · JPL
152580	1994 SL_{1}	—	September 27, 1994	Kitt Peak	Spacewatch	·	2.1 km	MPC · JPL
152581	1994 SE_{5}	—	September 28, 1994	Kitt Peak	Spacewatch	KOR	1.8 km	MPC · JPL
152582	1994 SL_{6}	—	September 28, 1994	Kitt Peak	Spacewatch	·	1.9 km	MPC · JPL
152583 Saône	1994 TF	Saône	October 4, 1994	San Marcello	L. Tesi, G. Cattani	·	1.7 km	MPC · JPL
152584	1994 UU_{5}	—	October 28, 1994	Kitt Peak	Spacewatch	EOS	2.7 km	MPC · JPL
152585	1994 WM_{7}	—	November 28, 1994	Kitt Peak	Spacewatch	·	2.5 km	MPC · JPL
152586	1994 WZ_{7}	—	November 28, 1994	Kitt Peak	Spacewatch	V	1.0 km	MPC · JPL
152587	1994 XH_{4}	—	December 4, 1994	Kitt Peak	Spacewatch	·	1.4 km	MPC · JPL
152588	1995 EY_{4}	—	March 2, 1995	Kitt Peak	Spacewatch	·	1.7 km	MPC · JPL
152589	1995 ME_{3}	—	June 25, 1995	Kitt Peak	Spacewatch	·	5.4 km	MPC · JPL
152590	1995 OC_{1}	—	July 30, 1995	Ondřejov	P. Pravec	·	2.0 km	MPC · JPL
152591	1995 QZ_{6}	—	August 22, 1995	Kitt Peak	Spacewatch	·	1.1 km	MPC · JPL
152592	1995 SK_{1}	—	September 22, 1995	Ondřejov	L. Kotková	HOF	4.0 km	MPC · JPL
152593	1995 SM_{40}	—	September 25, 1995	Kitt Peak	Spacewatch	·	2.4 km	MPC · JPL
152594	1995 SV_{45}	—	September 26, 1995	Kitt Peak	Spacewatch	·	880 m	MPC · JPL
152595	1995 SA_{51}	—	September 26, 1995	Kitt Peak	Spacewatch	·	2.4 km	MPC · JPL
152596	1995 SO_{70}	—	September 18, 1995	Kitt Peak	Spacewatch	·	1.1 km	MPC · JPL
152597	1995 TP_{6}	—	October 15, 1995	Kitt Peak	Spacewatch	KOR	1.7 km	MPC · JPL
152598	1995 TE_{7}	—	October 15, 1995	Kitt Peak	Spacewatch	AGN	1.9 km	MPC · JPL
152599	1995 UX_{10}	—	October 17, 1995	Kitt Peak	Spacewatch	·	2.5 km	MPC · JPL
152600	1995 US_{13}	—	October 17, 1995	Kitt Peak	Spacewatch	BRA	2.5 km	MPC · JPL

== 152601–152700 ==
back to top

Designation			Discovery			Properties		Ref
Permanent	Provisional	Named after	Date	Site	Discoverer(s)	Category	Diam.	Ref
152601	1995 UV_{37}	—	October 22, 1995	Kitt Peak	Spacewatch	·	960 m	MPC · JPL
152602	1995 UF_{54}	—	October 22, 1995	Kitt Peak	Spacewatch	·	1.1 km	MPC · JPL
152603	1995 VF_{2}	—	November 14, 1995	Kitt Peak	Spacewatch	·	730 m	MPC · JPL
152604	1995 VJ_{16}	—	November 15, 1995	Kitt Peak	Spacewatch	MRX	2.1 km	MPC · JPL
152605	1995 WG_{10}	—	November 16, 1995	Kitt Peak	Spacewatch	·	2.4 km	MPC · JPL
152606	1995 WL_{19}	—	November 17, 1995	Kitt Peak	Spacewatch	·	3.6 km	MPC · JPL
152607	1995 YE_{20}	—	December 23, 1995	Kitt Peak	Spacewatch	·	2.3 km	MPC · JPL
152608	1996 AO_{7}	—	January 12, 1996	Kitt Peak	Spacewatch	·	2.3 km	MPC · JPL
152609	1996 BJ_{7}	—	January 19, 1996	Kitt Peak	Spacewatch	·	1.3 km	MPC · JPL
152610	1996 BK_{17}	—	January 22, 1996	Socorro	Lincoln Lab ETS	·	1.5 km	MPC · JPL
152611	1996 ES_{7}	—	March 11, 1996	Kitt Peak	Spacewatch	MAS	950 m	MPC · JPL
152612	1996 EW_{8}	—	March 12, 1996	Kitt Peak	Spacewatch	MAS	1.1 km	MPC · JPL
152613	1996 FH_{14}	—	March 19, 1996	Kitt Peak	Spacewatch	NYS	1.8 km	MPC · JPL
152614	1996 GB_{8}	—	April 12, 1996	Kitt Peak	Spacewatch	MAS	1.2 km	MPC · JPL
152615	1996 GL_{16}	—	April 14, 1996	Kitt Peak	Spacewatch	HYG	3.9 km	MPC · JPL
152616	1996 HG_{19}	—	April 18, 1996	La Silla	E. W. Elst	THM	4.5 km	MPC · JPL
152617	1996 JR_{14}	—	May 12, 1996	Kitt Peak	Spacewatch	THM	3.5 km	MPC · JPL
152618	1996 MJ_{1}	—	June 16, 1996	Kitt Peak	Spacewatch	V	1.1 km	MPC · JPL
152619	1996 RW_{6}	—	September 5, 1996	Kitt Peak	Spacewatch	·	2.1 km	MPC · JPL
152620	1996 RX_{11}	—	September 8, 1996	Kitt Peak	Spacewatch	·	1.7 km	MPC · JPL
152621	1996 RY_{11}	—	September 8, 1996	Kitt Peak	Spacewatch	(5)	2.0 km	MPC · JPL
152622	1996 TS_{35}	—	October 11, 1996	Kitt Peak	Spacewatch	·	2.1 km	MPC · JPL
152623	1996 XL_{12}	—	December 4, 1996	Kitt Peak	Spacewatch	·	1.2 km	MPC · JPL
152624	1996 XS_{20}	—	December 5, 1996	Kitt Peak	Spacewatch	PAD	2.7 km	MPC · JPL
152625	1996 XQ_{23}	—	December 12, 1996	Kitt Peak	Spacewatch	EOS	2.8 km	MPC · JPL
152626	1997 CY_{11}	—	February 3, 1997	Kitt Peak	Spacewatch	·	3.5 km	MPC · JPL
152627	1997 DF	—	February 26, 1997	Ondřejov	L. Kotková	·	700 m	MPC · JPL
152628	1997 EF_{30}	—	March 9, 1997	Kitt Peak	Spacewatch	·	2.5 km	MPC · JPL
152629	1997 EH_{32}	—	March 11, 1997	Kitt Peak	Spacewatch	·	4.1 km	MPC · JPL
152630	1997 GP_{4}	—	April 7, 1997	Kitt Peak	Spacewatch	·	1.1 km	MPC · JPL
152631	1997 GO_{5}	—	April 8, 1997	Kitt Peak	Spacewatch	·	1.0 km	MPC · JPL
152632	1997 GG_{16}	—	April 3, 1997	Socorro	LINEAR	·	1.4 km	MPC · JPL
152633	1997 GO_{35}	—	April 6, 1997	Socorro	LINEAR	·	1.8 km	MPC · JPL
152634	1997 HN	—	April 28, 1997	Kitt Peak	Spacewatch	·	2.7 km	MPC · JPL
152635	1997 JF_{8}	—	May 1, 1997	Kitt Peak	Spacewatch	·	1.2 km	MPC · JPL
152636	1997 KR_{2}	—	May 29, 1997	Kitt Peak	Spacewatch	·	990 m	MPC · JPL
152637	1997 NC_{1}	—	July 5, 1997	Haleakala	NEAT	ATE +1km · PHA	950 m	MPC · JPL
152638	1997 OD_{2}	—	July 29, 1997	Majorca	Á. López J., R. Pacheco	NYS	1.9 km	MPC · JPL
152639	1997 PT	—	August 3, 1997	Caussols	ODAS	·	1.6 km	MPC · JPL
152640	1997 PP_{3}	—	August 5, 1997	Xinglong	SCAP	V	1.3 km	MPC · JPL
152641 Fredreed	1997 RJ_{3}	Fredreed	September 5, 1997	Alfred University	DeGraff, D. R., Weaver, S.	(5)	2.0 km	MPC · JPL
152642	1997 RV_{9}	—	September 10, 1997	Prescott	P. G. Comba	slow	3.1 km	MPC · JPL
152643	1997 SP_{6}	—	September 23, 1997	Kitt Peak	Spacewatch	MAS	1.1 km	MPC · JPL
152644	1997 SZ_{6}	—	September 23, 1997	Kitt Peak	Spacewatch	·	1.5 km	MPC · JPL
152645	1997 SN_{18}	—	September 28, 1997	Kitt Peak	Spacewatch	NYS	1.6 km	MPC · JPL
152646	1997 SM_{33}	—	September 23, 1997	Xinglong	SCAP	·	3.3 km	MPC · JPL
152647 Rinako	1997 UF_{15}	Rinako	October 29, 1997	Hadano Obs.	A. Asami	·	3.1 km	MPC · JPL
152648	1997 UL_{20}	—	October 28, 1997	Socorro	LINEAR	H	1.4 km	MPC · JPL
152649	1997 UX_{22}	—	October 25, 1997	Anderson Mesa	B. A. Skiff	·	2.8 km	MPC · JPL
152650	1997 VR_{5}	—	November 8, 1997	Oizumi	T. Kobayashi	slow	2.6 km	MPC · JPL
152651	1997 VN_{8}	—	November 1, 1997	Xinglong	SCAP	(5)	2.1 km	MPC · JPL
152652	1997 WG_{8}	—	November 20, 1997	Kitt Peak	Spacewatch	·	1.9 km	MPC · JPL
152653	1997 WV_{10}	—	November 22, 1997	Kitt Peak	Spacewatch	·	2.2 km	MPC · JPL
152654	1997 WB_{15}	—	November 23, 1997	Kitt Peak	Spacewatch	MAS	1.1 km	MPC · JPL
152655	1997 WL_{18}	—	November 23, 1997	Kitt Peak	Spacewatch	SUL	3.0 km	MPC · JPL
152656	1997 WC_{29}	—	November 29, 1997	Kitt Peak	Spacewatch	·	1.7 km	MPC · JPL
152657 Yukifumi	1997 XO_{2}	Yukifumi	December 4, 1997	Kuma Kogen	A. Nakamura	(5)	1.8 km	MPC · JPL
152658	1997 XG_{6}	—	December 5, 1997	Caussols	ODAS	·	1.3 km	MPC · JPL
152659	1997 XQ_{9}	—	December 4, 1997	Xinglong	SCAP	·	2.2 km	MPC · JPL
152660	1998 CW	—	February 5, 1998	Kleť	M. Tichý, Z. Moravec	MRX	1.6 km	MPC · JPL
152661	1998 DS_{1}	—	February 20, 1998	Kleť	Kleť	·	4.3 km	MPC · JPL
152662	1998 DQ_{8}	—	February 21, 1998	Xinglong	SCAP	·	3.0 km	MPC · JPL
152663	1998 DF_{32}	—	February 21, 1998	Xinglong	SCAP	·	6.1 km	MPC · JPL
152664	1998 FW_{4}	—	March 20, 1998	Socorro	LINEAR	APO · PHA	410 m	MPC · JPL
152665	1998 FG_{6}	—	March 18, 1998	Kitt Peak	Spacewatch	·	2.5 km	MPC · JPL
152666	1998 FN_{7}	—	March 20, 1998	Kitt Peak	Spacewatch	(29841)	2.1 km	MPC · JPL
152667	1998 FR_{11}	—	March 24, 1998	Socorro	LINEAR	T_{j} (2.88) · APO +1km	1.9 km	MPC · JPL
152668	1998 FS_{59}	—	March 20, 1998	Socorro	LINEAR	·	3.3 km	MPC · JPL
152669	1998 FK_{135}	—	March 22, 1998	Socorro	LINEAR	EUN	2.1 km	MPC · JPL
152670	1998 GN_{3}	—	April 2, 1998	Socorro	LINEAR	·	4.6 km	MPC · JPL
152671	1998 HL_{3}	—	April 21, 1998	Socorro	LINEAR	APO · PHA	300 m	MPC · JPL
152672	1998 HS_{5}	—	April 21, 1998	Caussols	ODAS	·	3.7 km	MPC · JPL
152673	1998 HU_{14}	—	April 17, 1998	Kitt Peak	Spacewatch	·	3.2 km	MPC · JPL
152674	1998 HB_{50}	—	April 27, 1998	Kitt Peak	Spacewatch	·	3.1 km	MPC · JPL
152675	1998 HS_{59}	—	April 21, 1998	Socorro	LINEAR	·	2.7 km	MPC · JPL
152676	1998 HT_{96}	—	April 21, 1998	Socorro	LINEAR	·	3.4 km	MPC · JPL
152677	1998 HA_{114}	—	April 23, 1998	Socorro	LINEAR	GEF	2.6 km	MPC · JPL
152678	1998 HE_{126}	—	April 23, 1998	Socorro	LINEAR	·	4.6 km	MPC · JPL
152679	1998 KU_{2}	—	May 22, 1998	Socorro	LINEAR	AMO · APO +1km · slow	4.2 km	MPC · JPL
152680	1998 KJ_{9}	—	May 27, 1998	Socorro	LINEAR	APO · PHA	450 m	MPC · JPL
152681	1998 KY_{10}	—	May 22, 1998	Kitt Peak	Spacewatch	EOS	2.5 km	MPC · JPL
152682	1998 KT_{21}	—	May 22, 1998	Socorro	LINEAR	·	4.1 km	MPC · JPL
152683	1998 KT_{23}	—	May 22, 1998	Socorro	LINEAR	EUN	2.8 km	MPC · JPL
152684	1998 KV_{26}	—	May 30, 1998	Kitt Peak	Spacewatch	·	4.2 km	MPC · JPL
152685	1998 MZ	—	June 18, 1998	Kitt Peak	Spacewatch	APO · PHA	480 m	MPC · JPL
152686	1998 QG_{42}	—	August 17, 1998	Socorro	LINEAR	·	1.6 km	MPC · JPL
152687	1998 QP_{58}	—	August 30, 1998	Kitt Peak	Spacewatch	·	790 m	MPC · JPL
152688	1998 QE_{61}	—	August 23, 1998	Anderson Mesa	LONEOS	·	1.3 km	MPC · JPL
152689	1998 QC_{63}	—	August 30, 1998	Xinglong	SCAP	·	1.3 km	MPC · JPL
152690	1998 QS_{75}	—	August 24, 1998	Socorro	LINEAR	TIR	4.5 km	MPC · JPL
152691	1998 QJ_{103}	—	August 26, 1998	La Silla	E. W. Elst	·	1.4 km	MPC · JPL
152692	1998 QN_{111}	—	August 30, 1998	Kitt Peak	Spacewatch	·	3.5 km	MPC · JPL
152693	1998 RM_{4}	—	September 14, 1998	Socorro	LINEAR	H	740 m	MPC · JPL
152694	1998 RX_{6}	—	September 12, 1998	Kitt Peak	Spacewatch	·	6.8 km	MPC · JPL
152695	1998 RN_{15}	—	September 15, 1998	Kitt Peak	Spacewatch	·	2.8 km	MPC · JPL
152696	1998 RO_{52}	—	September 14, 1998	Socorro	LINEAR	·	1.3 km	MPC · JPL
152697	1998 RU_{53}	—	September 14, 1998	Socorro	LINEAR	(2076)	1.5 km	MPC · JPL
152698	1998 RG_{58}	—	September 14, 1998	Socorro	LINEAR	·	1.1 km	MPC · JPL
152699	1998 RM_{60}	—	September 14, 1998	Socorro	LINEAR	·	1.6 km	MPC · JPL
152700	1998 RN_{65}	—	September 14, 1998	Socorro	LINEAR	·	1.1 km	MPC · JPL

== 152701–152800 ==
back to top

Designation			Discovery			Properties		Ref
Permanent	Provisional	Named after	Date	Site	Discoverer(s)	Category	Diam.	Ref
152701	1998 RF_{69}	—	September 14, 1998	Socorro	LINEAR	·	1.2 km	MPC · JPL
152702	1998 RE_{73}	—	September 14, 1998	Socorro	LINEAR	·	1.1 km	MPC · JPL
152703	1998 RJ_{79}	—	September 14, 1998	Socorro	LINEAR	·	1.5 km	MPC · JPL
152704	1998 SD_{4}	—	September 17, 1998	Xinglong	SCAP	·	570 m	MPC · JPL
152705	1998 SY_{37}	—	September 23, 1998	Kitt Peak	Spacewatch	·	1.2 km	MPC · JPL
152706	1998 SU_{54}	—	September 16, 1998	Anderson Mesa	LONEOS	slow	1.2 km	MPC · JPL
152707	1998 SM_{71}	—	September 21, 1998	La Silla	E. W. Elst	HYG	4.9 km	MPC · JPL
152708	1998 SU_{81}	—	September 26, 1998	Socorro	LINEAR	·	1.2 km	MPC · JPL
152709	1998 ST_{86}	—	September 26, 1998	Socorro	LINEAR	HYG	5.4 km	MPC · JPL
152710	1998 SW_{86}	—	September 26, 1998	Socorro	LINEAR	·	1.4 km	MPC · JPL
152711	1998 SZ_{97}	—	September 26, 1998	Socorro	LINEAR	·	5.2 km	MPC · JPL
152712	1998 SE_{106}	—	September 26, 1998	Socorro	LINEAR	·	1.6 km	MPC · JPL
152713	1998 SD_{114}	—	September 26, 1998	Socorro	LINEAR	·	1.2 km	MPC · JPL
152714	1998 SB_{115}	—	September 26, 1998	Socorro	LINEAR	·	5.6 km	MPC · JPL
152715	1998 SV_{120}	—	September 26, 1998	Socorro	LINEAR	EOS	3.4 km	MPC · JPL
152716	1998 SR_{125}	—	September 26, 1998	Socorro	LINEAR	EMA	7.1 km	MPC · JPL
152717	1998 SY_{157}	—	September 26, 1998	Socorro	LINEAR	·	1.0 km	MPC · JPL
152718	1998 SK_{162}	—	September 26, 1998	Socorro	LINEAR	·	1.5 km	MPC · JPL
152719	1998 TQ_{13}	—	October 13, 1998	Kitt Peak	Spacewatch	·	1.6 km	MPC · JPL
152720	1998 TF_{17}	—	October 14, 1998	Caussols	ODAS	NYS	1.3 km	MPC · JPL
152721	1998 TU_{25}	—	October 14, 1998	Kitt Peak	Spacewatch	·	1.1 km	MPC · JPL
152722	1998 UG_{3}	—	October 20, 1998	Caussols	ODAS	·	1.8 km	MPC · JPL
152723	1998 UM_{31}	—	October 22, 1998	Xinglong	SCAP	NYS	1.5 km	MPC · JPL
152724	1998 UW_{38}	—	October 28, 1998	Socorro	LINEAR	·	1.6 km	MPC · JPL
152725	1998 UL_{44}	—	October 17, 1998	Kitt Peak	Spacewatch	·	1.3 km	MPC · JPL
152726	1998 UT_{45}	—	October 24, 1998	Kitt Peak	Spacewatch	V	1.1 km	MPC · JPL
152727	1998 VW_{13}	—	November 10, 1998	Socorro	LINEAR	·	1.5 km	MPC · JPL
152728	1998 VR_{14}	—	November 10, 1998	Socorro	LINEAR	·	8.8 km	MPC · JPL
152729	1998 VJ_{20}	—	November 10, 1998	Socorro	LINEAR	HYG	4.6 km	MPC · JPL
152730	1998 VZ_{22}	—	November 10, 1998	Socorro	LINEAR	NYS ·	3.1 km	MPC · JPL
152731	1998 VU_{43}	—	November 15, 1998	Kitt Peak	Spacewatch	·	3.4 km	MPC · JPL
152732	1998 VN_{55}	—	November 13, 1998	Caussols	ODAS	·	1.6 km	MPC · JPL
152733 Vincenclesný	1998 WL_{8}	Vincenclesný	November 25, 1998	Kleť	M. Tichý, Z. Moravec	·	1.9 km	MPC · JPL
152734	1998 WR_{11}	—	November 21, 1998	Socorro	LINEAR	·	2.4 km	MPC · JPL
152735	1998 WS_{13}	—	November 21, 1998	Socorro	LINEAR	·	1.7 km	MPC · JPL
152736	1998 WX_{21}	—	November 18, 1998	Socorro	LINEAR	·	1.2 km	MPC · JPL
152737	1998 WF_{28}	—	November 18, 1998	Kitt Peak	Spacewatch	NYS	1.7 km	MPC · JPL
152738	1998 WM_{31}	—	November 19, 1998	Anderson Mesa	LONEOS	·	1.4 km	MPC · JPL
152739	1998 WC_{32}	—	November 21, 1998	Socorro	LINEAR	·	1.4 km	MPC · JPL
152740	1998 WW_{34}	—	November 18, 1998	Kitt Peak	Spacewatch	·	1.2 km	MPC · JPL
152741	1998 WT_{42}	—	November 16, 1998	Haleakala	NEAT	·	1.8 km	MPC · JPL
152742	1998 XE_{12}	—	December 14, 1998	Socorro	LINEAR	ATE	410 m	MPC · JPL
152743	1998 YK_{6}	—	December 22, 1998	Kleť	Kleť	·	2.3 km	MPC · JPL
152744	1998 YC_{9}	—	December 23, 1998	Xinglong	SCAP	MAS	920 m	MPC · JPL
152745	1998 YN_{11}	—	December 24, 1998	Kleť	Kleť	·	1.8 km	MPC · JPL
152746	1998 YH_{15}	—	December 22, 1998	Kitt Peak	Spacewatch	MAS	860 m	MPC · JPL
152747	1998 YK_{15}	—	December 22, 1998	Kitt Peak	Spacewatch	·	1.3 km	MPC · JPL
152748	1998 YF_{27}	—	December 28, 1998	Goodricke-Pigott	R. A. Tucker	·	910 m	MPC · JPL
152749	1998 YB_{32}	—	December 17, 1998	Socorro	LINEAR	NYS	1.2 km	MPC · JPL
152750 Brloh	1999 BL_{5}	Brloh	January 21, 1999	Kleť	J. Tichá, M. Tichý	·	2.1 km	MPC · JPL
152751	1999 BL_{27}	—	January 16, 1999	Kitt Peak	Spacewatch	MAS	970 m	MPC · JPL
152752	1999 CX_{3}	—	February 9, 1999	Ondřejov	L. Kotková	H	820 m	MPC · JPL
152753	1999 CK_{156}	—	February 7, 1999	Kitt Peak	Spacewatch	MAS	860 m	MPC · JPL
152754	1999 GS_{6}	—	April 15, 1999	Socorro	LINEAR	APO · PHA	410 m	MPC · JPL
152755	1999 GC_{16}	—	April 9, 1999	Socorro	LINEAR	·	2.2 km	MPC · JPL
152756	1999 JV_{3}	—	May 10, 1999	Socorro	LINEAR	APO	570 m	MPC · JPL
152757	1999 JL_{11}	—	May 12, 1999	Woomera	F. B. Zoltowski	·	1.9 km	MPC · JPL
152758	1999 JC_{33}	—	May 10, 1999	Socorro	LINEAR	·	2.0 km	MPC · JPL
152759	1999 JD_{45}	—	May 10, 1999	Socorro	LINEAR	·	2.3 km	MPC · JPL
152760	1999 KH	—	May 16, 1999	Kitt Peak	Spacewatch	·	2.3 km	MPC · JPL
152761	1999 LE	—	June 4, 1999	Catalina	CSS	·	2.6 km	MPC · JPL
152762	1999 LS_{2}	—	June 8, 1999	Socorro	LINEAR	·	2.8 km	MPC · JPL
152763	1999 LN_{4}	—	June 10, 1999	Socorro	LINEAR	·	3.0 km	MPC · JPL
152764	1999 LJ_{10}	—	June 8, 1999	Socorro	LINEAR	·	5.2 km	MPC · JPL
152765	1999 LN_{10}	—	June 8, 1999	Socorro	LINEAR	·	4.8 km	MPC · JPL
152766	1999 LZ_{11}	—	June 9, 1999	Socorro	LINEAR	·	4.5 km	MPC · JPL
152767	1999 NP_{12}	—	July 14, 1999	Socorro	LINEAR	·	2.5 km	MPC · JPL
152768	1999 NC_{16}	—	July 14, 1999	Socorro	LINEAR	·	2.0 km	MPC · JPL
152769	1999 RM_{20}	—	September 7, 1999	Socorro	LINEAR	·	4.7 km	MPC · JPL
152770	1999 RR_{28}	—	September 7, 1999	Socorro	LINEAR	APO · PHA	740 m	MPC · JPL
152771	1999 RB_{34}	—	September 10, 1999	Socorro	LINEAR	·	3.3 km	MPC · JPL
152772	1999 RE_{60}	—	September 7, 1999	Socorro	LINEAR	DOR	4.0 km	MPC · JPL
152773	1999 RO_{90}	—	September 7, 1999	Socorro	LINEAR	·	3.6 km	MPC · JPL
152774	1999 RM_{114}	—	September 9, 1999	Socorro	LINEAR	·	4.9 km	MPC · JPL
152775	1999 RV_{149}	—	September 9, 1999	Socorro	LINEAR	·	4.8 km	MPC · JPL
152776	1999 RF_{152}	—	September 9, 1999	Socorro	LINEAR	DOR	6.5 km	MPC · JPL
152777	1999 RA_{160}	—	September 9, 1999	Socorro	LINEAR	(21344)	3.4 km	MPC · JPL
152778	1999 RF_{163}	—	September 9, 1999	Socorro	LINEAR	·	3.6 km	MPC · JPL
152779	1999 RL_{169}	—	September 9, 1999	Socorro	LINEAR	·	4.6 km	MPC · JPL
152780	1999 RG_{189}	—	September 9, 1999	Socorro	LINEAR	·	3.7 km	MPC · JPL
152781	1999 RH_{190}	—	September 10, 1999	Socorro	LINEAR	·	4.2 km	MPC · JPL
152782	1999 RG_{200}	—	September 8, 1999	Socorro	LINEAR	·	5.1 km	MPC · JPL
152783	1999 RZ_{223}	—	September 7, 1999	Catalina	CSS	GEF	2.5 km	MPC · JPL
152784	1999 RW_{232}	—	September 8, 1999	Catalina	CSS	·	6.3 km	MPC · JPL
152785	1999 RG_{249}	—	September 7, 1999	Socorro	LINEAR	EOS	3.8 km	MPC · JPL
152786	1999 TS	—	October 1, 1999	Višnjan Observatory	K. Korlević	GEF	2.6 km	MPC · JPL
152787	1999 TB_{10}	—	October 7, 1999	Socorro	LINEAR	AMO	650 m	MPC · JPL
152788	1999 TS_{28}	—	October 4, 1999	Socorro	LINEAR	·	3.6 km	MPC · JPL
152789	1999 TA_{38}	—	October 1, 1999	Catalina	CSS	·	4.3 km	MPC · JPL
152790	1999 TR_{43}	—	October 3, 1999	Kitt Peak	Spacewatch	KOR	2.2 km	MPC · JPL
152791	1999 TC_{57}	—	October 6, 1999	Kitt Peak	Spacewatch	KOR	2.5 km	MPC · JPL
152792	1999 TS_{60}	—	October 7, 1999	Kitt Peak	Spacewatch	·	3.0 km	MPC · JPL
152793	1999 TP_{82}	—	October 12, 1999	Kitt Peak	Spacewatch	·	3.5 km	MPC · JPL
152794	1999 TL_{85}	—	October 14, 1999	Kitt Peak	Spacewatch	EOS	3.1 km	MPC · JPL
152795	1999 TW_{113}	—	October 4, 1999	Socorro	LINEAR	·	3.8 km	MPC · JPL
152796	1999 TB_{115}	—	October 4, 1999	Socorro	LINEAR	·	3.9 km	MPC · JPL
152797	1999 TG_{121}	—	October 4, 1999	Socorro	LINEAR	TEL	3.0 km	MPC · JPL
152798	1999 TP_{125}	—	October 4, 1999	Socorro	LINEAR	·	5.3 km	MPC · JPL
152799	1999 TC_{134}	—	October 6, 1999	Socorro	LINEAR	EOS	3.1 km	MPC · JPL
152800	1999 TG_{136}	—	October 6, 1999	Socorro	LINEAR	·	4.5 km	MPC · JPL

== 152801–152900 ==
back to top

Designation			Discovery			Properties		Ref
Permanent	Provisional	Named after	Date	Site	Discoverer(s)	Category	Diam.	Ref
152801	1999 TQ_{143}	—	October 7, 1999	Socorro	LINEAR	·	3.5 km	MPC · JPL
152802	1999 TC_{163}	—	October 9, 1999	Socorro	LINEAR	·	4.1 km	MPC · JPL
152803	1999 TN_{166}	—	October 10, 1999	Socorro	LINEAR	EOS	3.1 km	MPC · JPL
152804	1999 TZ_{178}	—	October 10, 1999	Socorro	LINEAR	HYG	4.2 km	MPC · JPL
152805	1999 TL_{180}	—	October 10, 1999	Socorro	LINEAR	·	5.9 km	MPC · JPL
152806	1999 TW_{185}	—	October 12, 1999	Socorro	LINEAR	EUP	6.2 km	MPC · JPL
152807	1999 TT_{190}	—	October 12, 1999	Socorro	LINEAR	·	4.3 km	MPC · JPL
152808	1999 TG_{195}	—	October 12, 1999	Socorro	LINEAR	·	5.3 km	MPC · JPL
152809	1999 TU_{197}	—	October 12, 1999	Socorro	LINEAR	fast	7.1 km	MPC · JPL
152810	1999 TJ_{241}	—	October 4, 1999	Catalina	CSS	·	4.3 km	MPC · JPL
152811	1999 TR_{241}	—	October 4, 1999	Catalina	CSS	·	4.2 km	MPC · JPL
152812	1999 TC_{244}	—	October 7, 1999	Catalina	CSS	·	8.0 km	MPC · JPL
152813	1999 TK_{257}	—	October 9, 1999	Socorro	LINEAR	KOR	2.4 km	MPC · JPL
152814	1999 TW_{260}	—	October 12, 1999	Kitt Peak	Spacewatch	·	3.3 km	MPC · JPL
152815	1999 TC_{270}	—	October 3, 1999	Socorro	LINEAR	·	3.8 km	MPC · JPL
152816	1999 TA_{283}	—	October 9, 1999	Socorro	LINEAR	KOR	2.7 km	MPC · JPL
152817	1999 TO_{301}	—	October 3, 1999	Kitt Peak	Spacewatch	·	3.2 km	MPC · JPL
152818	1999 UK_{4}	—	October 29, 1999	Ondřejov	L. Kotková	·	3.9 km	MPC · JPL
152819	1999 UY_{11}	—	October 29, 1999	Kitt Peak	Spacewatch	·	3.1 km	MPC · JPL
152820	1999 UF_{19}	—	October 30, 1999	Kitt Peak	Spacewatch	·	2.9 km	MPC · JPL
152821	1999 UJ_{29}	—	October 31, 1999	Kitt Peak	Spacewatch	·	2.9 km	MPC · JPL
152822	1999 UM_{39}	—	October 31, 1999	Kitt Peak	Spacewatch	EUN	2.8 km	MPC · JPL
152823	1999 UK_{41}	—	October 18, 1999	Kitt Peak	Spacewatch	·	3.4 km	MPC · JPL
152824	1999 UU_{43}	—	October 29, 1999	Catalina	CSS	EOS	3.8 km	MPC · JPL
152825	1999 UE_{49}	—	October 31, 1999	Catalina	CSS	·	3.0 km	MPC · JPL
152826	1999 UU_{56}	—	October 29, 1999	Catalina	CSS	·	5.4 km	MPC · JPL
152827	1999 VA_{24}	—	November 8, 1999	Majorca	R. Pacheco, Á. López J.	·	1.2 km	MPC · JPL
152828	1999 VT_{25}	—	November 12, 1999	Socorro	LINEAR	APO · PHA	200 m	MPC · JPL
152829	1999 VQ_{33}	—	November 3, 1999	Socorro	LINEAR	THM	3.2 km	MPC · JPL
152830 Dinkinesh	1999 VD_{57}	Dinkinesh	November 4, 1999	Socorro	LINEAR	moon	720 m	MPC · JPL
152831	1999 VJ_{57}	—	November 4, 1999	Socorro	LINEAR	THM	3.6 km	MPC · JPL
152832	1999 VV_{60}	—	November 4, 1999	Socorro	LINEAR	·	3.9 km	MPC · JPL
152833	1999 VT_{64}	—	November 4, 1999	Socorro	LINEAR	·	7.2 km	MPC · JPL
152834	1999 VL_{71}	—	November 4, 1999	Socorro	LINEAR	EOS	3.6 km	MPC · JPL
152835	1999 VD_{74}	—	November 4, 1999	Kitt Peak	Spacewatch	(11097) · CYB	2.5 km	MPC · JPL
152836	1999 VS_{77}	—	November 3, 1999	Socorro	LINEAR	·	3.2 km	MPC · JPL
152837	1999 VL_{95}	—	November 9, 1999	Socorro	LINEAR	EOS	3.1 km	MPC · JPL
152838	1999 VG_{100}	—	November 9, 1999	Socorro	LINEAR	·	3.7 km	MPC · JPL
152839	1999 VQ_{102}	—	November 9, 1999	Socorro	LINEAR	·	3.9 km	MPC · JPL
152840	1999 VD_{103}	—	November 9, 1999	Socorro	LINEAR	THM	3.2 km	MPC · JPL
152841	1999 VF_{107}	—	November 9, 1999	Socorro	LINEAR	·	2.0 km	MPC · JPL
152842	1999 VS_{107}	—	November 9, 1999	Socorro	LINEAR	THM	3.7 km	MPC · JPL
152843	1999 VR_{121}	—	November 4, 1999	Kitt Peak	Spacewatch	·	3.4 km	MPC · JPL
152844	1999 VY_{144}	—	November 13, 1999	Catalina	CSS	EOS	3.4 km	MPC · JPL
152845	1999 VX_{146}	—	November 12, 1999	Socorro	LINEAR	THM	2.7 km	MPC · JPL
152846	1999 VO_{156}	—	November 12, 1999	Socorro	LINEAR	·	3.5 km	MPC · JPL
152847	1999 VZ_{156}	—	November 12, 1999	Socorro	LINEAR	THM	3.5 km	MPC · JPL
152848	1999 VU_{164}	—	November 14, 1999	Socorro	LINEAR	·	7.2 km	MPC · JPL
152849	1999 VR_{170}	—	November 14, 1999	Socorro	LINEAR	·	970 m	MPC · JPL
152850	1999 VG_{183}	—	November 9, 1999	Socorro	LINEAR	·	1.0 km	MPC · JPL
152851	1999 VE_{187}	—	November 15, 1999	Socorro	LINEAR	KOR	2.6 km	MPC · JPL
152852	1999 VU_{198}	—	November 3, 1999	Catalina	CSS	·	5.3 km	MPC · JPL
152853	1999 VM_{199}	—	November 2, 1999	Catalina	CSS	THB	6.2 km	MPC · JPL
152854	1999 VD_{213}	—	November 12, 1999	Socorro	LINEAR	THM	2.9 km	MPC · JPL
152855	1999 VV_{215}	—	November 3, 1999	Socorro	LINEAR	·	4.9 km	MPC · JPL
152856	1999 WF_{12}	—	November 28, 1999	Kitt Peak	Spacewatch	EMA	6.5 km	MPC · JPL
152857	1999 XD_{27}	—	December 6, 1999	Socorro	LINEAR	·	4.5 km	MPC · JPL
152858	1999 XN_{35}	—	December 5, 1999	Anderson Mesa	LONEOS	·	2.3 km	MPC · JPL
152859	1999 XC_{41}	—	December 7, 1999	Socorro	LINEAR	·	1.4 km	MPC · JPL
152860	1999 XV_{49}	—	December 7, 1999	Socorro	LINEAR	·	4.8 km	MPC · JPL
152861	1999 XO_{50}	—	December 7, 1999	Socorro	LINEAR	·	4.5 km	MPC · JPL
152862	1999 XQ_{64}	—	December 7, 1999	Socorro	LINEAR	URS	6.0 km	MPC · JPL
152863	1999 XZ_{114}	—	December 11, 1999	Socorro	LINEAR	slow	6.7 km	MPC · JPL
152864	1999 XT_{143}	—	December 8, 1999	Kitt Peak	Spacewatch	·	2.1 km	MPC · JPL
152865	1999 XW_{144}	—	December 6, 1999	Kitt Peak	Spacewatch	·	2.7 km	MPC · JPL
152866	1999 XP_{216}	—	December 13, 1999	Kitt Peak	Spacewatch	·	950 m	MPC · JPL
152867	1999 XT_{223}	—	December 13, 1999	Kitt Peak	Spacewatch	·	1.1 km	MPC · JPL
152868	1999 XH_{251}	—	December 8, 1999	Kitt Peak	Spacewatch	·	1.0 km	MPC · JPL
152869	1999 XM_{254}	—	December 12, 1999	Kitt Peak	Spacewatch	·	870 m	MPC · JPL
152870	1999 YK_{8}	—	December 27, 1999	Kitt Peak	Spacewatch	·	700 m	MPC · JPL
152871	1999 YC_{22}	—	December 27, 1999	Kitt Peak	Spacewatch	·	1.0 km	MPC · JPL
152872	2000 AF_{27}	—	January 3, 2000	Socorro	LINEAR	·	1.3 km	MPC · JPL
152873	2000 AG_{36}	—	January 3, 2000	Socorro	LINEAR	·	1.5 km	MPC · JPL
152874	2000 AQ_{45}	—	January 3, 2000	Socorro	LINEAR	·	2.3 km	MPC · JPL
152875	2000 AX_{49}	—	January 5, 2000	Ondřejov	P. Kušnirák, P. Pravec	·	2.8 km	MPC · JPL
152876	2000 AZ_{82}	—	January 5, 2000	Socorro	LINEAR	·	5.5 km	MPC · JPL
152877	2000 AY_{126}	—	January 5, 2000	Socorro	LINEAR	·	1.3 km	MPC · JPL
152878	2000 AT_{140}	—	January 5, 2000	Socorro	LINEAR	·	1.3 km	MPC · JPL
152879	2000 AV_{160}	—	January 3, 2000	Socorro	LINEAR	·	1.3 km	MPC · JPL
152880	2000 AX_{211}	—	January 5, 2000	Kitt Peak	Spacewatch	·	1.3 km	MPC · JPL
152881	2000 AY_{257}	—	January 7, 2000	Socorro	LINEAR	·	1.3 km	MPC · JPL
152882	2000 BR_{2}	—	January 21, 2000	Socorro	LINEAR	PHO	2.2 km	MPC · JPL
152883	2000 BD_{20}	—	January 26, 2000	Kitt Peak	Spacewatch	·	1.3 km	MPC · JPL
152884	2000 BS_{47}	—	January 27, 2000	Kitt Peak	Spacewatch	·	1.1 km	MPC · JPL
152885	2000 CG_{15}	—	February 2, 2000	Socorro	LINEAR	·	1.5 km	MPC · JPL
152886	2000 CW_{16}	—	February 2, 2000	Socorro	LINEAR	·	1.6 km	MPC · JPL
152887	2000 CX_{20}	—	February 2, 2000	Socorro	LINEAR	(2076)	1.2 km	MPC · JPL
152888	2000 CA_{42}	—	February 2, 2000	Socorro	LINEAR	·	1.1 km	MPC · JPL
152889	2000 CF_{59}	—	February 5, 2000	Catalina	CSS	APO +1km	1.0 km	MPC · JPL
152890	2000 CU_{67}	—	February 1, 2000	Kitt Peak	Spacewatch	·	1.0 km	MPC · JPL
152891	2000 CA_{79}	—	February 8, 2000	Kitt Peak	Spacewatch	·	1.3 km	MPC · JPL
152892	2000 CD_{98}	—	February 7, 2000	Kitt Peak	Spacewatch	·	1.5 km	MPC · JPL
152893	2000 CQ_{98}	—	February 8, 2000	Kitt Peak	Spacewatch	·	1.9 km	MPC · JPL
152894	2000 CJ_{99}	—	February 8, 2000	Kitt Peak	Spacewatch	·	1.1 km	MPC · JPL
152895	2000 CQ_{101}	—	February 11, 2000	Socorro	LINEAR	AMO +1km	830 m	MPC · JPL
152896	2000 CG_{149}	—	February 8, 2000	Socorro	LINEAR	·	1.8 km	MPC · JPL
152897	2000 DO_{4}	—	February 28, 2000	Socorro	LINEAR	·	1.2 km	MPC · JPL
152898	2000 DC_{12}	—	February 27, 2000	Kitt Peak	Spacewatch	·	1.5 km	MPC · JPL
152899	2000 DR_{17}	—	February 29, 2000	Socorro	LINEAR	PHO	2.0 km	MPC · JPL
152900	2000 DC_{27}	—	February 29, 2000	Socorro	LINEAR	3:2 · SHU	8.5 km	MPC · JPL

== 152901–153000 ==
back to top

Designation			Discovery			Properties		Ref
Permanent	Provisional	Named after	Date	Site	Discoverer(s)	Category	Diam.	Ref
152901	2000 DR_{31}	—	February 29, 2000	Socorro	LINEAR	·	1.8 km	MPC · JPL
152902	2000 DC_{32}	—	February 29, 2000	Socorro	LINEAR	·	1.3 km	MPC · JPL
152903	2000 DP_{46}	—	February 29, 2000	Socorro	LINEAR	·	1.1 km	MPC · JPL
152904	2000 DW_{52}	—	February 29, 2000	Socorro	LINEAR	·	2.2 km	MPC · JPL
152905	2000 DW_{60}	—	February 29, 2000	Socorro	LINEAR	·	1.6 km	MPC · JPL
152906	2000 DN_{64}	—	February 29, 2000	Socorro	LINEAR	·	1.3 km	MPC · JPL
152907	2000 DP_{65}	—	February 29, 2000	Socorro	LINEAR	V	850 m	MPC · JPL
152908	2000 DH_{70}	—	February 29, 2000	Socorro	LINEAR	·	1.5 km	MPC · JPL
152909	2000 DW_{72}	—	February 29, 2000	Socorro	LINEAR	·	1.3 km	MPC · JPL
152910	2000 DS_{74}	—	February 29, 2000	Socorro	LINEAR	·	1.4 km	MPC · JPL
152911	2000 DY_{78}	—	February 29, 2000	Socorro	LINEAR	(2076)	1.7 km	MPC · JPL
152912	2000 DQ_{86}	—	February 29, 2000	Socorro	LINEAR	V	990 m	MPC · JPL
152913	2000 DX_{100}	—	February 29, 2000	Socorro	LINEAR	·	1.6 km	MPC · JPL
152914	2000 DK_{103}	—	February 29, 2000	Socorro	LINEAR	fast	1.5 km	MPC · JPL
152915	2000 DA_{114}	—	February 27, 2000	Kitt Peak	Spacewatch	·	1.9 km	MPC · JPL
152916	2000 EL_{4}	—	March 2, 2000	Kitt Peak	Spacewatch	·	1.7 km	MPC · JPL
152917	2000 EM_{4}	—	March 2, 2000	Kitt Peak	Spacewatch	·	1.1 km	MPC · JPL
152918	2000 EN_{21}	—	March 4, 2000	Socorro	LINEAR	PHO	2.8 km	MPC · JPL
152919	2000 EU_{21}	—	March 5, 2000	Socorro	LINEAR	PHO	2.0 km	MPC · JPL
152920	2000 EG_{29}	—	March 5, 2000	Socorro	LINEAR	·	1.2 km	MPC · JPL
152921	2000 EK_{32}	—	March 5, 2000	Socorro	LINEAR	·	2.3 km	MPC · JPL
152922	2000 EC_{51}	—	March 3, 2000	Kitt Peak	Spacewatch	·	1.3 km	MPC · JPL
152923	2000 EC_{60}	—	March 10, 2000	Socorro	LINEAR	·	1.2 km	MPC · JPL
152924	2000 EM_{65}	—	March 10, 2000	Socorro	LINEAR	·	1.6 km	MPC · JPL
152925	2000 EB_{67}	—	March 10, 2000	Socorro	LINEAR	·	1.5 km	MPC · JPL
152926	2000 EJ_{76}	—	March 5, 2000	Socorro	LINEAR	·	1.3 km	MPC · JPL
152927	2000 EG_{77}	—	March 5, 2000	Socorro	LINEAR	·	1.5 km	MPC · JPL
152928	2000 EG_{91}	—	March 9, 2000	Socorro	LINEAR	·	1.7 km	MPC · JPL
152929	2000 EZ_{92}	—	March 9, 2000	Socorro	LINEAR	·	1.3 km	MPC · JPL
152930	2000 EB_{102}	—	March 14, 2000	Kitt Peak	Spacewatch	(2076)	1.2 km	MPC · JPL
152931	2000 EA_{107}	—	March 15, 2000	Socorro	LINEAR	ATE +1km	1.6 km	MPC · JPL
152932	2000 EM_{128}	—	March 11, 2000	Anderson Mesa	LONEOS	NYS	1.6 km	MPC · JPL
152933	2000 EO_{131}	—	March 11, 2000	Socorro	LINEAR	·	1.9 km	MPC · JPL
152934	2000 EO_{133}	—	March 11, 2000	Socorro	LINEAR	·	1.2 km	MPC · JPL
152935	2000 EZ_{134}	—	March 11, 2000	Anderson Mesa	LONEOS	·	1.3 km	MPC · JPL
152936	2000 EP_{135}	—	March 11, 2000	Anderson Mesa	LONEOS	·	2.1 km	MPC · JPL
152937	2000 EO_{142}	—	March 3, 2000	Socorro	LINEAR	·	1.3 km	MPC · JPL
152938	2000 EU_{193}	—	March 3, 2000	Socorro	LINEAR	·	1.6 km	MPC · JPL
152939	2000 FY_{4}	—	March 27, 2000	Kitt Peak	Spacewatch	NYS	1.3 km	MPC · JPL
152940	2000 FU_{5}	—	March 25, 2000	Kitt Peak	Spacewatch	V	1.1 km	MPC · JPL
152941	2000 FM_{10}	—	March 30, 2000	Kitt Peak	Spacewatch	APO +1km	820 m	MPC · JPL
152942	2000 FN_{10}	—	March 30, 2000	Socorro	LINEAR	AMO +1km	1.6 km	MPC · JPL
152943	2000 FY_{10}	—	March 26, 2000	Socorro	LINEAR	PHO	4.4 km	MPC · JPL
152944	2000 FD_{25}	—	March 29, 2000	Socorro	LINEAR	PHO	1.9 km	MPC · JPL
152945	2000 FR_{25}	—	March 27, 2000	Anderson Mesa	LONEOS	PHO	4.5 km	MPC · JPL
152946	2000 FG_{28}	—	March 27, 2000	Anderson Mesa	LONEOS	·	1.2 km	MPC · JPL
152947	2000 FE_{30}	—	March 27, 2000	Anderson Mesa	LONEOS	·	1.6 km	MPC · JPL
152948	2000 FP_{32}	—	March 29, 2000	Socorro	LINEAR	·	1.2 km	MPC · JPL
152949	2000 FG_{58}	—	March 26, 2000	Anderson Mesa	LONEOS	·	1.9 km	MPC · JPL
152950	2000 FQ_{64}	—	March 30, 2000	Socorro	LINEAR	·	2.1 km	MPC · JPL
152951	2000 FJ_{71}	—	March 29, 2000	Kitt Peak	Spacewatch	·	1.4 km	MPC · JPL
152952	2000 GC_{2}	—	April 2, 2000	Socorro	LINEAR	AMO +1km	780 m	MPC · JPL
152953	2000 GT_{21}	—	April 5, 2000	Socorro	LINEAR	·	1.9 km	MPC · JPL
152954	2000 GN_{27}	—	April 5, 2000	Socorro	LINEAR	·	2.0 km	MPC · JPL
152955	2000 GM_{35}	—	April 5, 2000	Socorro	LINEAR	·	1.8 km	MPC · JPL
152956	2000 GM_{37}	—	April 5, 2000	Socorro	LINEAR	·	1.7 km	MPC · JPL
152957	2000 GD_{42}	—	April 5, 2000	Socorro	LINEAR	·	1.3 km	MPC · JPL
152958	2000 GX_{47}	—	April 5, 2000	Socorro	LINEAR	·	1.4 km	MPC · JPL
152959	2000 GJ_{50}	—	April 5, 2000	Socorro	LINEAR	·	1.0 km	MPC · JPL
152960	2000 GA_{52}	—	April 5, 2000	Socorro	LINEAR	NYS	1.6 km	MPC · JPL
152961	2000 GH_{60}	—	April 5, 2000	Socorro	LINEAR	·	2.8 km	MPC · JPL
152962	2000 GZ_{67}	—	April 5, 2000	Socorro	LINEAR	·	1.6 km	MPC · JPL
152963	2000 GF_{68}	—	April 5, 2000	Socorro	LINEAR	·	1.5 km	MPC · JPL
152964	2000 GP_{82}	—	April 4, 2000	Socorro	LINEAR	APO +1km	790 m	MPC · JPL
152965	2000 GW_{86}	—	April 4, 2000	Socorro	LINEAR	·	2.9 km	MPC · JPL
152966	2000 GK_{104}	—	April 7, 2000	Socorro	LINEAR	·	2.7 km	MPC · JPL
152967	2000 GV_{105}	—	April 7, 2000	Socorro	LINEAR	·	3.1 km	MPC · JPL
152968	2000 GX_{116}	—	April 2, 2000	Kitt Peak	Spacewatch	·	1.5 km	MPC · JPL
152969	2000 GC_{117}	—	April 2, 2000	Kitt Peak	Spacewatch	NYS	1.4 km	MPC · JPL
152970	2000 GB_{120}	—	April 5, 2000	Kitt Peak	Spacewatch	·	1.2 km	MPC · JPL
152971	2000 GU_{120}	—	April 5, 2000	Kitt Peak	Spacewatch	NYS	1.7 km	MPC · JPL
152972	2000 GD_{121}	—	April 5, 2000	Kitt Peak	Spacewatch	·	1.9 km	MPC · JPL
152973	2000 GV_{121}	—	April 6, 2000	Kitt Peak	Spacewatch	ERI	2.3 km	MPC · JPL
152974	2000 GZ_{122}	—	April 7, 2000	Socorro	LINEAR	PHO	1.6 km	MPC · JPL
152975	2000 GM_{135}	—	April 8, 2000	Socorro	LINEAR	V	1.1 km	MPC · JPL
152976	2000 GK_{140}	—	April 4, 2000	Anderson Mesa	LONEOS	NYS ·	3.1 km	MPC · JPL
152977	2000 GJ_{141}	—	April 7, 2000	Anderson Mesa	LONEOS	·	1.7 km	MPC · JPL
152978	2000 GJ_{147}	—	April 13, 2000	Anderson Mesa	LONEOS	APO · PHA	530 m	MPC · JPL
152979	2000 GR_{148}	—	April 5, 2000	Socorro	LINEAR	·	1.5 km	MPC · JPL
152980	2000 GP_{150}	—	April 5, 2000	Socorro	LINEAR	MAS	1.1 km	MPC · JPL
152981	2000 GM_{156}	—	April 6, 2000	Socorro	LINEAR	·	1.3 km	MPC · JPL
152982	2000 GM_{158}	—	April 7, 2000	Anderson Mesa	LONEOS	·	1.5 km	MPC · JPL
152983	2000 GB_{162}	—	April 7, 2000	Anderson Mesa	LONEOS	·	1.7 km	MPC · JPL
152984	2000 GJ_{162}	—	April 8, 2000	Socorro	LINEAR	·	1.5 km	MPC · JPL
152985 Kenkellermann	2000 GS_{182}	Kenkellermann	April 4, 2000	Anderson Mesa	Wasserman, L. H.	V	1.1 km	MPC · JPL
152986	2000 HS_{3}	—	April 26, 2000	Kitt Peak	Spacewatch	·	1.4 km	MPC · JPL
152987	2000 HM_{14}	—	April 27, 2000	Socorro	LINEAR	PHO	2.3 km	MPC · JPL
152988	2000 HH_{22}	—	April 29, 2000	Socorro	LINEAR	·	2.0 km	MPC · JPL
152989	2000 HO_{23}	—	April 30, 2000	Socorro	LINEAR	·	2.1 km	MPC · JPL
152990	2000 HB_{26}	—	April 24, 2000	Anderson Mesa	LONEOS	·	1.6 km	MPC · JPL
152991	2000 HV_{37}	—	April 30, 2000	Socorro	LINEAR	·	2.0 km	MPC · JPL
152992	2000 HD_{38}	—	April 28, 2000	Kitt Peak	Spacewatch	·	1.1 km	MPC · JPL
152993	2000 HH_{44}	—	April 26, 2000	Anderson Mesa	LONEOS	·	2.2 km	MPC · JPL
152994	2000 HX_{44}	—	April 26, 2000	Anderson Mesa	LONEOS	·	1.7 km	MPC · JPL
152995	2000 HW_{53}	—	April 29, 2000	Socorro	LINEAR	·	2.0 km	MPC · JPL
152996	2000 HM_{60}	—	April 25, 2000	Anderson Mesa	LONEOS	·	2.5 km	MPC · JPL
152997	2000 HH_{71}	—	April 24, 2000	Anderson Mesa	LONEOS	NYS	1.7 km	MPC · JPL
152998	2000 HG_{79}	—	April 28, 2000	Anderson Mesa	LONEOS	PHO	1.7 km	MPC · JPL
152999	2000 HW_{85}	—	April 30, 2000	Anderson Mesa	LONEOS	·	2.4 km	MPC · JPL
153000	2000 HP_{86}	—	April 30, 2000	Anderson Mesa	LONEOS	MAS	1.3 km	MPC · JPL

back to top

== See also ==
- Meanings of minor-planet names: 152001–153000
