= 152188 Morricone =

Background asteroid from the central region of the asteroid belt

Discovery
- Discovered by: F. Mallia; A. Maury
- Discovery site: Campo Catino Austral Obs.
- Discovery date: 27 August 2005

Designations
- Pronunciation: /mɒrəˈkoʊni/
- Named after: Ennio Morricone (Italian composer)
- Alternative designations: 2005 QP_{51}
- Minor planet category: main-belt · (middle) background · Eunomia

Orbital characteristics
- Epoch 4 September 2017 (JD 2458000.5)
- Uncertainty parameter 0
- Observation arc: 14.79 yr (5,403 days)
- Aphelion: 3.0205 AU
- Perihelion: 2.0937 AU
- Semi-major axis: 2.5571 AU
- Eccentricity: 0.1812
- Orbital period (sidereal): 4.09 yr (1,494 days)
- Mean anomaly: 269.61°
- Mean motion: 0° 14^{m} 27.6^{s} / day
- Inclination: 14.798°
- Longitude of ascending node: 30.416°
- Argument of perihelion: 29.074°

Physical characteristics
- Mean diameter: 2.3 km (est. at 0.20); 4.2 km (est. at 0.06)
- Absolute magnitude (H): 15.6 · 15.7

152188 Morricone (provisional designation 2005 QP_{51}) is a background asteroid from the central region of the asteroid belt, approximately 3 kilometers (2 miles) in diameter. It was discovered on 27 August 2005, by astronomers Franco Mallia and Alain Maury at the Campo Catino Austral Observatory (CAO), San Pedro de Atacama, Chile, a robotic station of the Italian Campo Catino Astronomical Observatory. The asteroid was named for Italian composer Ennio Morricone.

== Orbit and classification ==
When applying the hierarchical clustering method to the asteroid's proper orbital elements, Morricone is both a non-family asteroid from the main belt's background population (according to Nesvorný), and a distant member of the Eunomia family (according to Milani and Knežević). It orbits the Sun in the central asteroid belt at a distance of 2.1–3.0 AU once every 4 years and 1 month (1,494 days; semi-major axis of 2.56 AU). Its orbit has an eccentricity of 0.18 and an inclination of 15° with respect to the ecliptic.

The body's observation arc begins with its observation by AMOS at Haleakala Observatory in August 2001, or four years prior to its official discovery observation by CAO at San Pedro de Atacama in Chile.

== Physical characteristics ==
The asteroid's spectral type is unknown.

=== Diameter and albedo ===
Morricone has not been observed by any of the space-based surveys such as the Infrared Astronomical Satellite IRAS, the Japanese Akari satellite or the NEOWISE mission of NASA's Wide-field Infrared Survey Explorer. Based on a generic magnitude-to-diameter conversion, the asteroid measures 2.3 and 4.2 kilometers in diameter based on an absolute magnitude of 15.6 and a geometric albedo of 0.06 and 0.20, which roughly correspond to a body of carbonaceous and stony composition, respectively (both types are common in the central asteroid belt).

=== Rotation period ===
As of 2018, no rotational lightcurve of Morricone has been obtained from photometric observations. The body's rotation period, shape and poles remain unknown.

== Naming ==
This minor planet was named after Italian composer Ennio Morricone (1928–2020), who wrote over 500 scores for cinema and television, including several famous Spaghetti Westerns. The official naming citation was published by the Minor Planet Center on 1 June 2007 (M.P.C. 59925).
