= List of minor planets: 44001–45000 =

The following is a partial list of minor planets, running from minor-planet number 44001 through 45000, inclusive. The primary data for this and other partial lists is based on JPL's "Small-Body Orbital Elements" and data available from the Minor Planet Center. Critical list information is also provided by the MPC, unless otherwise specified from Lowell Observatory. A detailed description of the table's columns and additional sources are given on the main page including a complete list of every page in this series, and a statistical break-up on the dynamical classification of minor planets.

Also see the summary list of all named bodies in numerical and alphabetical order, and the corresponding naming citations for the number range of this particular list. New namings may only be added to this list after official publication, as the preannouncement of names is condemned by the Working Group for Small Bodies Nomenclature of the International Astronomical Union.

Near-Earth obj.	MBA (inner)	MBA (outer)	Centaur
Mars-crosser	MBA (middle)	Jupiter trojan	Trans-Neptunian obj.
Unclassified

== 44001–44100 ==
Designation			Discovery			Properties		Ref
Permanent	Provisional	Named after	Date	Site	Discoverer(s)	Category	Diam.	Ref
44001 Jonquet	1997 RE_{3}	Jonquet	September 6, 1997	Pises	Pises	·	6.6 km	MPC · JPL
44002	1997 ST_{1}	—	September 23, 1997	Prescott	P. G. Comba	·	4.9 km	MPC · JPL
44003	1997 SZ_{2}	—	September 23, 1997	Farra d'Isonzo	Farra d'Isonzo	THM	8.1 km	MPC · JPL
44004	1997 SS_{3}	—	September 25, 1997	Rand	G. R. Viscome	·	2.5 km	MPC · JPL
44005 Migliardi	1997 SY_{3}	Migliardi	September 25, 1997	Pianoro	V. Goretti	EOS	5.7 km	MPC · JPL
44006	1997 TF_{17}	—	October 6, 1997	Nachi-Katsuura	Y. Shimizu, T. Urata	·	4.7 km	MPC · JPL
44007	1997 TA_{25}	—	October 7, 1997	Lake Clear	Williams, K. A.	·	8.6 km	MPC · JPL
44008	1997 TN_{25}	—	October 11, 1997	Xinglong	SCAP	·	2.4 km	MPC · JPL
44009	1997 TB_{26}	—	October 11, 1997	Xinglong	SCAP	HYG	7.4 km	MPC · JPL
44010	1997 UH_{11}	—	October 29, 1997	Haleakala	NEAT	·	4.2 km	MPC · JPL
44011 Juubichi	1997 UH_{15}	Juubichi	October 29, 1997	Nanyo	T. Okuni	EOS	7.7 km	MPC · JPL
44012	1997 UL_{22}	—	October 26, 1997	Chichibu	N. Satō	·	1.5 km	MPC · JPL
44013 Iidetenmondai	1997 VB_{7}	Iidetenmondai	November 1, 1997	Nanyo	T. Okuni	·	5.4 km	MPC · JPL
44014	1997 WT_{1}	—	November 19, 1997	Oizumi	T. Kobayashi	·	3.8 km	MPC · JPL
44015	1997 WD_{10}	—	November 21, 1997	Kitt Peak	Spacewatch	KOR	3.9 km	MPC · JPL
44016 Jimmypage	1997 WQ_{28}	Jimmypage	November 30, 1997	Rolvenden	M. Armstrong, Armstrong, C.	ADE	9.5 km	MPC · JPL
44017	1997 WV_{35}	—	November 29, 1997	Socorro	LINEAR	HYG	8.5 km	MPC · JPL
44018	1997 WL_{36}	—	November 29, 1997	Socorro	LINEAR	·	2.7 km	MPC · JPL
44019	1997 WO_{39}	—	November 29, 1997	Socorro	LINEAR	·	5.7 km	MPC · JPL
44020	1997 WS_{39}	—	November 29, 1997	Socorro	LINEAR	·	4.0 km	MPC · JPL
44021	1997 WU_{39}	—	November 29, 1997	Socorro	LINEAR	MAR	3.4 km	MPC · JPL
44022	1997 WB_{43}	—	November 29, 1997	Socorro	LINEAR	·	4.6 km	MPC · JPL
44023	1997 WO_{46}	—	November 26, 1997	Socorro	LINEAR	·	5.6 km	MPC · JPL
44024	1997 WP_{47}	—	November 19, 1997	Xinglong	SCAP	·	4.3 km	MPC · JPL
44025	1997 XY_{11}	—	December 6, 1997	Burlington	Handley, T.	PAD	6.4 km	MPC · JPL
44026	1997 YD_{11}	—	December 25, 1997	Haleakala	NEAT	CYB · slow	11 km	MPC · JPL
44027 Termain	1998 AD	Termain	January 2, 1998	Goodricke-Pigott	R. A. Tucker	·	6.4 km	MPC · JPL
44028	1998 BD_{1}	—	January 19, 1998	Oizumi	T. Kobayashi	EUN	5.8 km	MPC · JPL
44029	1998 BK_{4}	—	January 21, 1998	Nachi-Katsuura	Y. Shimizu, T. Urata	·	1.9 km	MPC · JPL
44030	1998 BQ_{11}	—	January 23, 1998	Socorro	LINEAR	·	2.1 km	MPC · JPL
44031	1998 CO	—	February 3, 1998	Kleť	M. Tichý, Z. Moravec	·	2.0 km	MPC · JPL
44032	1998 CD_{3}	—	February 6, 1998	La Silla	E. W. Elst	·	1.8 km	MPC · JPL
44033 Michez	1998 CB_{4}	Michez	February 15, 1998	Bologna	San Vittore	·	2.0 km	MPC · JPL
44034	1998 DB	—	February 17, 1998	Oizumi	T. Kobayashi	·	2.8 km	MPC · JPL
44035	1998 DM_{6}	—	February 22, 1998	Haleakala	NEAT	·	2.2 km	MPC · JPL
44036	1998 DO_{7}	—	February 22, 1998	Kitt Peak	Spacewatch	·	3.9 km	MPC · JPL
44037	1998 DD_{18}	—	February 23, 1998	Kitt Peak	Spacewatch	·	1.9 km	MPC · JPL
44038	1998 DQ_{27}	—	February 21, 1998	Kitt Peak	Spacewatch	·	2.0 km	MPC · JPL
44039 de Sahagún	1998 DS_{33}	de Sahagún	February 27, 1998	La Silla	E. W. Elst	·	2.3 km	MPC · JPL
44040	1998 DA_{35}	—	February 27, 1998	La Silla	E. W. Elst	·	3.2 km	MPC · JPL
44041 Françoiselaunay	1998 ER_{1}	Françoiselaunay	March 2, 1998	Caussols	ODAS	·	1.8 km	MPC · JPL
44042	1998 ES_{9}	—	March 2, 1998	Xinglong	SCAP	·	1.8 km	MPC · JPL
44043	1998 EW_{12}	—	March 1, 1998	La Silla	E. W. Elst	·	2.3 km	MPC · JPL
44044	1998 EE_{13}	—	March 1, 1998	La Silla	E. W. Elst	ERI	3.1 km	MPC · JPL
44045	1998 EA_{14}	—	March 1, 1998	La Silla	E. W. Elst	·	4.5 km	MPC · JPL
44046	1998 FS_{1}	—	March 21, 1998	Kitt Peak	Spacewatch	·	1.6 km	MPC · JPL
44047	1998 FL_{2}	—	March 20, 1998	Socorro	LINEAR	H · slow	1.3 km	MPC · JPL
44048	1998 FF_{4}	—	March 21, 1998	Kitt Peak	Spacewatch	V	2.0 km	MPC · JPL
44049	1998 FG_{4}	—	March 21, 1998	Kitt Peak	Spacewatch	·	3.3 km	MPC · JPL
44050	1998 FU_{11}	—	March 24, 1998	Haleakala	NEAT	·	2.3 km	MPC · JPL
44051	1998 FP_{13}	—	March 26, 1998	Haleakala	NEAT	·	2.4 km	MPC · JPL
44052	1998 FA_{16}	—	March 28, 1998	Caussols	ODAS	·	3.4 km	MPC · JPL
44053	1998 FU_{20}	—	March 20, 1998	Socorro	LINEAR	·	2.7 km	MPC · JPL
44054	1998 FR_{26}	—	March 20, 1998	Socorro	LINEAR	·	1.5 km	MPC · JPL
44055	1998 FC_{30}	—	March 20, 1998	Socorro	LINEAR	MAR · slow	4.6 km	MPC · JPL
44056	1998 FW_{36}	—	March 20, 1998	Socorro	LINEAR	·	1.8 km	MPC · JPL
44057	1998 FW_{39}	—	March 20, 1998	Socorro	LINEAR	·	2.9 km	MPC · JPL
44058	1998 FA_{40}	—	March 20, 1998	Socorro	LINEAR	·	1.6 km	MPC · JPL
44059	1998 FP_{40}	—	March 20, 1998	Socorro	LINEAR	·	2.2 km	MPC · JPL
44060	1998 FU_{42}	—	March 20, 1998	Socorro	LINEAR	·	3.3 km	MPC · JPL
44061	1998 FJ_{43}	—	March 20, 1998	Socorro	LINEAR	·	2.3 km	MPC · JPL
44062	1998 FK_{46}	—	March 20, 1998	Socorro	LINEAR	·	2.3 km	MPC · JPL
44063	1998 FW_{50}	—	March 20, 1998	Socorro	LINEAR	(2076)	2.5 km	MPC · JPL
44064	1998 FN_{53}	—	March 20, 1998	Socorro	LINEAR	·	2.2 km	MPC · JPL
44065	1998 FU_{54}	—	March 20, 1998	Socorro	LINEAR	·	2.2 km	MPC · JPL
44066	1998 FH_{55}	—	March 20, 1998	Socorro	LINEAR	·	2.0 km	MPC · JPL
44067	1998 FZ_{55}	—	March 20, 1998	Socorro	LINEAR	·	3.5 km	MPC · JPL
44068	1998 FX_{58}	—	March 20, 1998	Socorro	LINEAR	V	2.2 km	MPC · JPL
44069	1998 FG_{61}	—	March 20, 1998	Socorro	LINEAR	·	2.0 km	MPC · JPL
44070	1998 FP_{61}	—	March 20, 1998	Socorro	LINEAR	·	2.6 km	MPC · JPL
44071	1998 FR_{65}	—	March 20, 1998	Socorro	LINEAR	·	3.0 km	MPC · JPL
44072	1998 FS_{65}	—	March 20, 1998	Socorro	LINEAR	·	2.3 km	MPC · JPL
44073	1998 FV_{65}	—	March 20, 1998	Socorro	LINEAR	·	2.2 km	MPC · JPL
44074	1998 FB_{66}	—	March 20, 1998	Socorro	LINEAR	·	3.6 km	MPC · JPL
44075	1998 FB_{67}	—	March 20, 1998	Socorro	LINEAR	·	2.3 km	MPC · JPL
44076	1998 FT_{69}	—	March 20, 1998	Socorro	LINEAR	·	1.9 km	MPC · JPL
44077	1998 FW_{69}	—	March 20, 1998	Socorro	LINEAR	·	2.3 km	MPC · JPL
44078	1998 FB_{70}	—	March 20, 1998	Socorro	LINEAR	·	1.6 km	MPC · JPL
44079	1998 FK_{71}	—	March 20, 1998	Socorro	LINEAR	·	1.9 km	MPC · JPL
44080	1998 FQ_{71}	—	March 20, 1998	Socorro	LINEAR	NYS	1.9 km	MPC · JPL
44081	1998 FG_{75}	—	March 24, 1998	Socorro	LINEAR	V	2.3 km	MPC · JPL
44082	1998 FH_{75}	—	March 24, 1998	Socorro	LINEAR	·	2.7 km	MPC · JPL
44083	1998 FZ_{77}	—	March 24, 1998	Socorro	LINEAR	·	2.3 km	MPC · JPL
44084	1998 FX_{78}	—	March 24, 1998	Socorro	LINEAR	V	2.0 km	MPC · JPL
44085	1998 FG_{80}	—	March 24, 1998	Socorro	LINEAR	·	2.2 km	MPC · JPL
44086	1998 FV_{83}	—	March 24, 1998	Socorro	LINEAR	·	2.3 km	MPC · JPL
44087	1998 FG_{99}	—	March 31, 1998	Socorro	LINEAR	·	2.6 km	MPC · JPL
44088	1998 FW_{101}	—	March 31, 1998	Socorro	LINEAR	·	1.9 km	MPC · JPL
44089	1998 FZ_{101}	—	March 31, 1998	Socorro	LINEAR	·	2.0 km	MPC · JPL
44090	1998 FT_{105}	—	March 31, 1998	Socorro	LINEAR	·	1.7 km	MPC · JPL
44091	1998 FB_{106}	—	March 31, 1998	Socorro	LINEAR	·	1.7 km	MPC · JPL
44092	1998 FJ_{106}	—	March 31, 1998	Socorro	LINEAR	·	1.9 km	MPC · JPL
44093	1998 FF_{109}	—	March 31, 1998	Socorro	LINEAR	·	2.3 km	MPC · JPL
44094	1998 FV_{109}	—	March 31, 1998	Socorro	LINEAR	·	2.5 km	MPC · JPL
44095	1998 FS_{113}	—	March 31, 1998	Socorro	LINEAR	·	3.4 km	MPC · JPL
44096	1998 FJ_{114}	—	March 31, 1998	Socorro	LINEAR	V	2.1 km	MPC · JPL
44097	1998 FK_{115}	—	March 31, 1998	Socorro	LINEAR	V	2.9 km	MPC · JPL
44098	1998 FB_{117}	—	March 31, 1998	Socorro	LINEAR	·	2.6 km	MPC · JPL
44099	1998 FT_{117}	—	March 31, 1998	Socorro	LINEAR	·	2.0 km	MPC · JPL
44100	1998 FX_{117}	—	March 31, 1998	Socorro	LINEAR	·	4.8 km	MPC · JPL

== 44101–44200 ==
back to top

Designation			Discovery			Properties		Ref
Permanent	Provisional	Named after	Date	Site	Discoverer(s)	Category	Diam.	Ref
44101	1998 FT_{121}	—	March 20, 1998	Socorro	LINEAR	(2076) · fast	3.0 km	MPC · JPL
44102	1998 FY_{129}	—	March 22, 1998	Socorro	LINEAR	·	1.4 km	MPC · JPL
44103 Aldana	1998 GE_{1}	Aldana	April 4, 1998	Teide	Casas, R.	·	3.0 km	MPC · JPL
44104	1998 GO_{1}	—	April 7, 1998	Kleť	Kleť	·	3.9 km	MPC · JPL
44105	1998 GG_{11}	—	April 1, 1998	Socorro	LINEAR	·	1.9 km	MPC · JPL
44106	1998 HT_{3}	—	April 19, 1998	Kitt Peak	Spacewatch	·	1.5 km	MPC · JPL
44107	1998 HH_{4}	—	April 21, 1998	Kitt Peak	Spacewatch	·	2.1 km	MPC · JPL
44108	1998 HT_{4}	—	April 20, 1998	Višnjan Observatory	Višnjan	·	3.4 km	MPC · JPL
44109	1998 HO_{5}	—	April 22, 1998	Kitt Peak	Spacewatch	(2076)	2.3 km	MPC · JPL
44110 Cassegrain	1998 HT_{5}	Cassegrain	April 21, 1998	Caussols	ODAS	·	1.9 km	MPC · JPL
44111	1998 HN_{6}	—	April 22, 1998	Caussols	ODAS	NYS	2.3 km	MPC · JPL
44112	1998 HS_{13}	—	April 18, 1998	Socorro	LINEAR	·	3.3 km	MPC · JPL
44113	1998 HH_{14}	—	April 29, 1998	Haleakala	NEAT	·	2.1 km	MPC · JPL
44114	1998 HN_{21}	—	April 20, 1998	Socorro	LINEAR	·	1.5 km	MPC · JPL
44115	1998 HQ_{23}	—	April 28, 1998	Prescott	P. G. Comba	PHO	2.0 km	MPC · JPL
44116	1998 HK_{26}	—	April 20, 1998	Kitt Peak	Spacewatch	·	1.4 km	MPC · JPL
44117 Haroldlarson	1998 HL_{27}	Haroldlarson	April 21, 1998	Kitt Peak	Spacewatch	·	2.8 km	MPC · JPL
44118	1998 HB_{29}	—	April 25, 1998	Haleakala	NEAT	PHO	4.1 km	MPC · JPL
44119	1998 HN_{32}	—	April 20, 1998	Socorro	LINEAR	·	3.1 km	MPC · JPL
44120	1998 HU_{32}	—	April 20, 1998	Socorro	LINEAR	·	2.8 km	MPC · JPL
44121	1998 HL_{34}	—	April 20, 1998	Socorro	LINEAR	·	2.1 km	MPC · JPL
44122	1998 HT_{34}	—	April 20, 1998	Socorro	LINEAR	·	2.3 km	MPC · JPL
44123	1998 HC_{36}	—	April 20, 1998	Socorro	LINEAR	·	2.1 km	MPC · JPL
44124	1998 HM_{37}	—	April 20, 1998	Socorro	LINEAR	·	3.4 km	MPC · JPL
44125	1998 HE_{38}	—	April 20, 1998	Socorro	LINEAR	·	3.7 km	MPC · JPL
44126	1998 HR_{38}	—	April 20, 1998	Socorro	LINEAR	V	2.5 km	MPC · JPL
44127	1998 HO_{43}	—	April 20, 1998	Socorro	LINEAR	V · slow	2.5 km	MPC · JPL
44128	1998 HU_{50}	—	April 25, 1998	Anderson Mesa	LONEOS	·	2.1 km	MPC · JPL
44129	1998 HX_{50}	—	April 25, 1998	Anderson Mesa	LONEOS	·	2.4 km	MPC · JPL
44130	1998 HU_{51}	—	April 30, 1998	Anderson Mesa	LONEOS	·	6.1 km	MPC · JPL
44131	1998 HG_{53}	—	April 21, 1998	Socorro	LINEAR	·	4.7 km	MPC · JPL
44132	1998 HL_{79}	—	April 21, 1998	Socorro	LINEAR	·	2.4 km	MPC · JPL
44133	1998 HL_{80}	—	April 21, 1998	Socorro	LINEAR	·	1.9 km	MPC · JPL
44134	1998 HB_{87}	—	April 21, 1998	Socorro	LINEAR	·	2.7 km	MPC · JPL
44135	1998 HD_{88}	—	April 21, 1998	Socorro	LINEAR	·	2.5 km	MPC · JPL
44136	1998 HW_{89}	—	April 21, 1998	Socorro	LINEAR	·	2.1 km	MPC · JPL
44137	1998 HD_{92}	—	April 21, 1998	Socorro	LINEAR	·	1.9 km	MPC · JPL
44138	1998 HG_{92}	—	April 21, 1998	Socorro	LINEAR	·	2.6 km	MPC · JPL
44139	1998 HZ_{92}	—	April 21, 1998	Socorro	LINEAR	·	2.1 km	MPC · JPL
44140	1998 HK_{94}	—	April 21, 1998	Socorro	LINEAR	·	5.6 km	MPC · JPL
44141	1998 HL_{96}	—	April 21, 1998	Socorro	LINEAR	·	2.2 km	MPC · JPL
44142	1998 HU_{96}	—	April 21, 1998	Socorro	LINEAR	·	2.6 km	MPC · JPL
44143	1998 HF_{98}	—	April 21, 1998	Socorro	LINEAR	·	2.2 km	MPC · JPL
44144	1998 HG_{98}	—	April 21, 1998	Socorro	LINEAR	(2076)	2.7 km	MPC · JPL
44145	1998 HJ_{101}	—	April 21, 1998	Socorro	LINEAR	fast	2.7 km	MPC · JPL
44146	1998 HZ_{101}	—	April 25, 1998	La Silla	E. W. Elst	V	1.4 km	MPC · JPL
44147	1998 HB_{103}	—	April 25, 1998	La Silla	E. W. Elst	V	2.5 km	MPC · JPL
44148	1998 HC_{106}	—	April 23, 1998	Socorro	LINEAR	·	3.0 km	MPC · JPL
44149	1998 HS_{106}	—	April 23, 1998	Socorro	LINEAR	·	2.7 km	MPC · JPL
44150	1998 HC_{108}	—	April 23, 1998	Socorro	LINEAR	·	3.3 km	MPC · JPL
44151	1998 HX_{110}	—	April 23, 1998	Socorro	LINEAR	(1338) (FLO)	2.1 km	MPC · JPL
44152	1998 HN_{121}	—	April 23, 1998	Socorro	LINEAR	·	3.0 km	MPC · JPL
44153	1998 HQ_{121}	—	April 23, 1998	Socorro	LINEAR	V	1.5 km	MPC · JPL
44154	1998 HZ_{122}	—	April 23, 1998	Socorro	LINEAR	·	4.5 km	MPC · JPL
44155	1998 HD_{123}	—	April 23, 1998	Socorro	LINEAR	·	2.3 km	MPC · JPL
44156	1998 HN_{123}	—	April 23, 1998	Socorro	LINEAR	·	3.9 km	MPC · JPL
44157	1998 HO_{123}	—	April 23, 1998	Socorro	LINEAR	·	3.8 km	MPC · JPL
44158	1998 HN_{128}	—	April 19, 1998	Socorro	LINEAR	·	2.8 km	MPC · JPL
44159	1998 HV_{130}	—	April 19, 1998	Socorro	LINEAR	·	2.2 km	MPC · JPL
44160	1998 HQ_{134}	—	April 19, 1998	Socorro	LINEAR	·	2.7 km	MPC · JPL
44161	1998 HT_{139}	—	April 21, 1998	Socorro	LINEAR	·	2.3 km	MPC · JPL
44162	1998 HC_{148}	—	April 25, 1998	La Silla	E. W. Elst	V	1.9 km	MPC · JPL
44163	1998 HH_{148}	—	April 25, 1998	La Silla	E. W. Elst	·	2.2 km	MPC · JPL
44164	1998 JS	—	May 1, 1998	Haleakala	NEAT	·	2.2 km	MPC · JPL
44165	1998 JR_{1}	—	May 1, 1998	Haleakala	NEAT	·	3.9 km	MPC · JPL
44166	1998 JF_{2}	—	May 1, 1998	Haleakala	NEAT	·	3.6 km	MPC · JPL
44167 Patriciaquinn	1998 JA_{3}	Patriciaquinn	May 1, 1998	Anderson Mesa	LONEOS	·	3.5 km	MPC · JPL
44168	1998 JJ_{4}	—	May 15, 1998	Woomera	F. B. Zoltowski	·	3.8 km	MPC · JPL
44169	1998 KK_{2}	—	May 22, 1998	Socorro	LINEAR	·	4.5 km	MPC · JPL
44170	1998 KK_{7}	—	May 23, 1998	Anderson Mesa	LONEOS	·	4.1 km	MPC · JPL
44171	1998 KR_{8}	—	May 23, 1998	Anderson Mesa	LONEOS	·	2.6 km	MPC · JPL
44172	1998 KN_{9}	—	May 28, 1998	Prescott	P. G. Comba	·	5.0 km	MPC · JPL
44173	1998 KH_{13}	—	May 22, 1998	Socorro	LINEAR	·	2.6 km	MPC · JPL
44174	1998 KL_{22}	—	May 22, 1998	Socorro	LINEAR	·	2.1 km	MPC · JPL
44175	1998 KA_{29}	—	May 22, 1998	Socorro	LINEAR	·	3.3 km	MPC · JPL
44176	1998 KT_{30}	—	May 22, 1998	Socorro	LINEAR	·	2.1 km	MPC · JPL
44177	1998 KX_{31}	—	May 22, 1998	Socorro	LINEAR	NYS	3.3 km	MPC · JPL
44178	1998 KY_{32}	—	May 22, 1998	Socorro	LINEAR	ERI	5.5 km	MPC · JPL
44179	1998 KJ_{33}	—	May 22, 1998	Socorro	LINEAR	·	2.7 km	MPC · JPL
44180	1998 KE_{37}	—	May 22, 1998	Socorro	LINEAR	·	3.2 km	MPC · JPL
44181	1998 KA_{43}	—	May 28, 1998	Kitt Peak	Spacewatch	·	6.9 km	MPC · JPL
44182	1998 KL_{44}	—	May 22, 1998	Socorro	LINEAR	·	4.0 km	MPC · JPL
44183	1998 KQ_{45}	—	May 22, 1998	Socorro	LINEAR	·	3.1 km	MPC · JPL
44184	1998 KZ_{45}	—	May 22, 1998	Socorro	LINEAR	·	4.3 km	MPC · JPL
44185	1998 KH_{54}	—	May 23, 1998	Socorro	LINEAR	·	3.4 km	MPC · JPL
44186	1998 KX_{55}	—	May 23, 1998	Socorro	LINEAR	·	4.1 km	MPC · JPL
44187	1998 KC_{56}	—	May 23, 1998	Socorro	LINEAR	PHO	4.6 km	MPC · JPL
44188	1998 KJ_{58}	—	May 21, 1998	Reedy Creek	J. Broughton	·	2.3 km	MPC · JPL
44189	1998 KW_{61}	—	May 24, 1998	Socorro	LINEAR	NYS	2.9 km	MPC · JPL
44190	1998 KD_{63}	—	May 22, 1998	Socorro	LINEAR	·	3.6 km	MPC · JPL
44191	1998 LF_{2}	—	June 1, 1998	La Silla	E. W. Elst	·	4.0 km	MPC · JPL
44192 Paulguttman	1998 ME_{2}	Paulguttman	June 18, 1998	Mount Hopkins	C. W. Hergenrother	·	2.8 km	MPC · JPL
44193	1998 MW_{2}	—	June 16, 1998	Kitt Peak	Spacewatch	·	2.9 km	MPC · JPL
44194 Urmuz	1998 MQ_{7}	Urmuz	June 19, 1998	Caussols	ODAS	MAR	2.3 km	MPC · JPL
44195 Michaelcordova	1998 MW_{7}	Michaelcordova	June 19, 1998	Anderson Mesa	LONEOS	·	2.5 km	MPC · JPL
44196	1998 ML_{9}	—	June 19, 1998	Socorro	LINEAR	V	1.9 km	MPC · JPL
44197	1998 MX_{15}	—	June 17, 1998	Kitt Peak	Spacewatch	EUN	4.7 km	MPC · JPL
44198	1998 MP_{24}	—	June 25, 1998	Woomera	F. B. Zoltowski	·	2.8 km	MPC · JPL
44199	1998 MU_{24}	—	June 23, 1998	Socorro	LINEAR	·	3.4 km	MPC · JPL
44200	1998 MJ_{25}	—	June 24, 1998	Socorro	LINEAR	·	4.0 km	MPC · JPL

== 44201–44300 ==
back to top

Designation			Discovery			Properties		Ref
Permanent	Provisional	Named after	Date	Site	Discoverer(s)	Category	Diam.	Ref
44201	1998 MS_{28}	—	June 24, 1998	Socorro	LINEAR	·	9.1 km	MPC · JPL
44202	1998 MJ_{32}	—	June 24, 1998	Socorro	LINEAR	·	3.6 km	MPC · JPL
44203	1998 MN_{34}	—	June 24, 1998	Socorro	LINEAR	·	4.9 km	MPC · JPL
44204	1998 MJ_{35}	—	June 24, 1998	Socorro	LINEAR	·	4.1 km	MPC · JPL
44205	1998 MY_{45}	—	June 24, 1998	Socorro	LINEAR	·	3.9 km	MPC · JPL
44206 Clareschneider	1998 OM	Clareschneider	July 17, 1998	Anderson Mesa	LONEOS	EUN	3.9 km	MPC · JPL
44207	1998 OJ_{1}	—	July 21, 1998	Farra d'Isonzo	Farra d'Isonzo	EUN	3.0 km	MPC · JPL
44208	1998 OY_{6}	—	July 20, 1998	Xinglong	SCAP	·	4.4 km	MPC · JPL
44209	1998 OH_{7}	—	July 28, 1998	Xinglong	SCAP	·	3.9 km	MPC · JPL
44210	1998 OX_{10}	—	July 26, 1998	La Silla	E. W. Elst	·	5.4 km	MPC · JPL
44211	1998 OC_{12}	—	July 23, 1998	Reedy Creek	J. Broughton	·	2.4 km	MPC · JPL
44212	1998 OJ_{12}	—	July 29, 1998	Reedy Creek	J. Broughton	(5)	2.4 km	MPC · JPL
44213	1998 OZ_{13}	—	July 26, 1998	La Silla	E. W. Elst	EUN	3.5 km	MPC · JPL
44214	1998 OC_{14}	—	July 26, 1998	La Silla	E. W. Elst	·	5.0 km	MPC · JPL
44215	1998 OX_{14}	—	July 26, 1998	La Silla	E. W. Elst	EUN	5.3 km	MPC · JPL
44216 Olivercabasa	1998 PH	Olivercabasa	August 4, 1998	Teide	Vigil, E., Casarramona, F.	·	4.9 km	MPC · JPL
44217 Whittle	1998 PO_{1}	Whittle	August 12, 1998	Reedy Creek	J. Broughton	MAR	8.0 km	MPC · JPL
44218	1998 QO_{1}	—	August 17, 1998	Višnjan Observatory	Višnjan	·	6.2 km	MPC · JPL
44219	1998 QB_{3}	—	August 17, 1998	Socorro	LINEAR	·	7.1 km	MPC · JPL
44220	1998 QT_{7}	—	August 17, 1998	Socorro	LINEAR	·	4.7 km	MPC · JPL
44221	1998 QK_{8}	—	August 17, 1998	Socorro	LINEAR	·	4.4 km	MPC · JPL
44222	1998 QG_{9}	—	August 17, 1998	Socorro	LINEAR	GEF	4.7 km	MPC · JPL
44223	1998 QH_{10}	—	August 17, 1998	Socorro	LINEAR	·	4.0 km	MPC · JPL
44224	1998 QP_{10}	—	August 17, 1998	Socorro	LINEAR	·	7.3 km	MPC · JPL
44225	1998 QY_{10}	—	August 17, 1998	Socorro	LINEAR	·	2.9 km	MPC · JPL
44226	1998 QZ_{11}	—	August 17, 1998	Socorro	LINEAR	·	4.7 km	MPC · JPL
44227	1998 QP_{14}	—	August 17, 1998	Socorro	LINEAR	PHO	6.8 km	MPC · JPL
44228	1998 QT_{16}	—	August 17, 1998	Socorro	LINEAR	(5)	3.5 km	MPC · JPL
44229	1998 QH_{22}	—	August 17, 1998	Socorro	LINEAR	·	4.4 km	MPC · JPL
44230	1998 QS_{22}	—	August 17, 1998	Socorro	LINEAR	·	5.7 km	MPC · JPL
44231	1998 QE_{25}	—	August 17, 1998	Socorro	LINEAR	·	2.5 km	MPC · JPL
44232	1998 QJ_{28}	—	August 25, 1998	Socorro	LINEAR	PAL	9.7 km	MPC · JPL
44233	1998 QM_{28}	—	August 26, 1998	Prescott	P. G. Comba	·	4.9 km	MPC · JPL
44234	1998 QE_{29}	—	August 26, 1998	Ondřejov	L. Kotková	EUN	5.3 km	MPC · JPL
44235	1998 QL_{31}	—	August 17, 1998	Socorro	LINEAR	·	3.5 km	MPC · JPL
44236	1998 QA_{33}	—	August 17, 1998	Socorro	LINEAR	·	3.0 km	MPC · JPL
44237	1998 QC_{33}	—	August 17, 1998	Socorro	LINEAR	slow	4.1 km	MPC · JPL
44238	1998 QV_{33}	—	August 17, 1998	Socorro	LINEAR	NYS	3.5 km	MPC · JPL
44239	1998 QR_{34}	—	August 17, 1998	Socorro	LINEAR	·	2.8 km	MPC · JPL
44240	1998 QB_{35}	—	August 17, 1998	Socorro	LINEAR	EUN	5.5 km	MPC · JPL
44241	1998 QU_{36}	—	August 17, 1998	Socorro	LINEAR	GEF	5.0 km	MPC · JPL
44242	1998 QB_{37}	—	August 17, 1998	Socorro	LINEAR	·	2.8 km	MPC · JPL
44243	1998 QN_{37}	—	August 17, 1998	Socorro	LINEAR	·	3.0 km	MPC · JPL
44244	1998 QP_{38}	—	August 17, 1998	Socorro	LINEAR	·	5.5 km	MPC · JPL
44245	1998 QG_{40}	—	August 17, 1998	Socorro	LINEAR	·	5.6 km	MPC · JPL
44246	1998 QQ_{40}	—	August 17, 1998	Socorro	LINEAR	·	4.5 km	MPC · JPL
44247	1998 QR_{40}	—	August 17, 1998	Socorro	LINEAR	·	7.0 km	MPC · JPL
44248	1998 QT_{41}	—	August 17, 1998	Socorro	LINEAR	(5)	3.6 km	MPC · JPL
44249	1998 QH_{42}	—	August 17, 1998	Socorro	LINEAR	MAR	6.5 km	MPC · JPL
44250	1998 QT_{42}	—	August 17, 1998	Socorro	LINEAR	·	3.7 km	MPC · JPL
44251	1998 QZ_{43}	—	August 17, 1998	Socorro	LINEAR	KOR	4.0 km	MPC · JPL
44252	1998 QF_{44}	—	August 17, 1998	Socorro	LINEAR	(5)	4.0 km	MPC · JPL
44253	1998 QO_{44}	—	August 17, 1998	Socorro	LINEAR	KOR	4.1 km	MPC · JPL
44254	1998 QM_{45}	—	August 17, 1998	Socorro	LINEAR	·	5.6 km	MPC · JPL
44255	1998 QV_{45}	—	August 17, 1998	Socorro	LINEAR	·	5.3 km	MPC · JPL
44256	1998 QJ_{46}	—	August 17, 1998	Socorro	LINEAR	·	3.6 km	MPC · JPL
44257	1998 QQ_{47}	—	August 17, 1998	Socorro	LINEAR	HNS	4.6 km	MPC · JPL
44258	1998 QT_{47}	—	August 17, 1998	Socorro	LINEAR	EUN	4.9 km	MPC · JPL
44259	1998 QW_{48}	—	August 17, 1998	Socorro	LINEAR	EUN	4.5 km	MPC · JPL
44260	1998 QO_{49}	—	August 17, 1998	Socorro	LINEAR	MAR	3.2 km	MPC · JPL
44261	1998 QR_{50}	—	August 17, 1998	Socorro	LINEAR	·	7.1 km	MPC · JPL
44262	1998 QR_{51}	—	August 17, 1998	Socorro	LINEAR	·	4.9 km	MPC · JPL
44263 Nansouty	1998 QR_{53}	Nansouty	August 28, 1998	Dax	P. Dupouy, Marechal, F.	·	4.0 km	MPC · JPL
44264	1998 QH_{54}	—	August 27, 1998	Anderson Mesa	LONEOS	·	3.6 km	MPC · JPL
44265	1998 QN_{54}	—	August 27, 1998	Anderson Mesa	LONEOS	·	3.1 km	MPC · JPL
44266	1998 QV_{55}	—	August 26, 1998	Višnjan Observatory	Višnjan	·	2.8 km	MPC · JPL
44267	1998 QZ_{55}	—	August 29, 1998	Višnjan Observatory	Višnjan	·	4.3 km	MPC · JPL
44268	1998 QX_{60}	—	August 23, 1998	Anderson Mesa	LONEOS	·	3.6 km	MPC · JPL
44269	1998 QY_{60}	—	August 23, 1998	Anderson Mesa	LONEOS	MAR	3.4 km	MPC · JPL
44270	1998 QV_{66}	—	August 24, 1998	Socorro	LINEAR	·	3.0 km	MPC · JPL
44271	1998 QY_{67}	—	August 24, 1998	Socorro	LINEAR	·	4.5 km	MPC · JPL
44272	1998 QB_{70}	—	August 24, 1998	Socorro	LINEAR	·	3.5 km	MPC · JPL
44273	1998 QH_{70}	—	August 24, 1998	Socorro	LINEAR	·	3.4 km	MPC · JPL
44274	1998 QU_{70}	—	August 24, 1998	Socorro	LINEAR	·	3.2 km	MPC · JPL
44275	1998 QP_{71}	—	August 24, 1998	Socorro	LINEAR	EUN	3.4 km	MPC · JPL
44276	1998 QZ_{71}	—	August 24, 1998	Socorro	LINEAR	HNS	3.1 km	MPC · JPL
44277	1998 QY_{72}	—	August 24, 1998	Socorro	LINEAR	·	4.1 km	MPC · JPL
44278	1998 QU_{74}	—	August 24, 1998	Socorro	LINEAR	PHO	2.8 km	MPC · JPL
44279	1998 QH_{75}	—	August 24, 1998	Socorro	LINEAR	EUN	2.6 km	MPC · JPL
44280	1998 QE_{77}	—	August 24, 1998	Socorro	LINEAR	·	7.3 km	MPC · JPL
44281	1998 QX_{77}	—	August 24, 1998	Socorro	LINEAR	·	4.8 km	MPC · JPL
44282	1998 QB_{78}	—	August 24, 1998	Socorro	LINEAR	·	3.5 km	MPC · JPL
44283	1998 QP_{78}	—	August 24, 1998	Socorro	LINEAR	MAR	4.7 km	MPC · JPL
44284	1998 QX_{78}	—	August 24, 1998	Socorro	LINEAR	·	4.7 km	MPC · JPL
44285	1998 QD_{80}	—	August 24, 1998	Socorro	LINEAR	·	4.1 km	MPC · JPL
44286	1998 QK_{83}	—	August 24, 1998	Socorro	LINEAR	slow	4.0 km	MPC · JPL
44287	1998 QO_{85}	—	August 24, 1998	Socorro	LINEAR	EUN	4.3 km	MPC · JPL
44288	1998 QP_{85}	—	August 24, 1998	Socorro	LINEAR	EOS	4.3 km	MPC · JPL
44289	1998 QU_{86}	—	August 24, 1998	Socorro	LINEAR	·	3.5 km	MPC · JPL
44290	1998 QA_{87}	—	August 24, 1998	Socorro	LINEAR	·	4.7 km	MPC · JPL
44291	1998 QL_{87}	—	August 24, 1998	Socorro	LINEAR	·	3.9 km	MPC · JPL
44292	1998 QO_{87}	—	August 24, 1998	Socorro	LINEAR	EOS	5.6 km	MPC · JPL
44293	1998 QQ_{87}	—	August 24, 1998	Socorro	LINEAR	MAR	3.3 km	MPC · JPL
44294	1998 QE_{89}	—	August 24, 1998	Socorro	LINEAR	ADE	7.6 km	MPC · JPL
44295	1998 QU_{89}	—	August 24, 1998	Socorro	LINEAR	EOS	9.4 km	MPC · JPL
44296	1998 QM_{90}	—	August 24, 1998	Socorro	LINEAR	PHO	4.0 km	MPC · JPL
44297	1998 QF_{93}	—	August 28, 1998	Socorro	LINEAR	EUN	3.3 km	MPC · JPL
44298	1998 QD_{94}	—	August 17, 1998	Socorro	LINEAR	MAR	5.1 km	MPC · JPL
44299	1998 QX_{94}	—	August 19, 1998	Socorro	LINEAR	·	3.8 km	MPC · JPL
44300	1998 QC_{95}	—	August 19, 1998	Socorro	LINEAR	·	5.9 km	MPC · JPL

== 44301–44400 ==
back to top

Designation			Discovery			Properties		Ref
Permanent	Provisional	Named after	Date	Site	Discoverer(s)	Category	Diam.	Ref
44301	1998 QM_{96}	—	August 19, 1998	Socorro	LINEAR	·	4.2 km	MPC · JPL
44302	1998 QQ_{99}	—	August 26, 1998	La Silla	E. W. Elst	·	3.5 km	MPC · JPL
44303	1998 QA_{101}	—	August 26, 1998	La Silla	E. W. Elst	·	2.4 km	MPC · JPL
44304	1998 QD_{102}	—	August 26, 1998	La Silla	E. W. Elst	·	5.9 km	MPC · JPL
44305	1998 QK_{102}	—	August 26, 1998	La Silla	E. W. Elst	·	3.3 km	MPC · JPL
44306	1998 QC_{104}	—	August 26, 1998	La Silla	E. W. Elst	·	4.1 km	MPC · JPL
44307	1998 QH_{105}	—	August 25, 1998	La Silla	E. W. Elst	EUN	4.3 km	MPC · JPL
44308	1998 RG	—	September 1, 1998	Woomera	F. B. Zoltowski	GEF	3.8 km	MPC · JPL
44309	1998 RT	—	September 9, 1998	Farra d'Isonzo	Farra d'Isonzo	EUN	3.1 km	MPC · JPL
44310	1998 RU_{1}	—	September 14, 1998	Catalina	CSS	EUN	3.5 km	MPC · JPL
44311	1998 RP_{6}	—	September 15, 1998	Anderson Mesa	LONEOS	·	3.9 km	MPC · JPL
44312	1998 RC_{8}	—	September 12, 1998	Kitt Peak	Spacewatch	·	5.8 km	MPC · JPL
44313	1998 RV_{12}	—	September 14, 1998	Kitt Peak	Spacewatch	·	3.4 km	MPC · JPL
44314	1998 RV_{15}	—	September 4, 1998	Xinglong	SCAP	·	5.0 km	MPC · JPL
44315	1998 RG_{16}	—	September 14, 1998	Xinglong	SCAP	·	4.5 km	MPC · JPL
44316	1998 RN_{22}	—	September 14, 1998	Socorro	LINEAR	(5)	3.9 km	MPC · JPL
44317	1998 RC_{23}	—	September 14, 1998	Socorro	LINEAR	EUN	3.1 km	MPC · JPL
44318	1998 RK_{24}	—	September 14, 1998	Socorro	LINEAR	·	3.1 km	MPC · JPL
44319	1998 RR_{29}	—	September 14, 1998	Socorro	LINEAR	(5)	2.8 km	MPC · JPL
44320	1998 RJ_{31}	—	September 14, 1998	Socorro	LINEAR	EUN	5.0 km	MPC · JPL
44321	1998 RY_{42}	—	September 14, 1998	Socorro	LINEAR	HNS	3.6 km	MPC · JPL
44322	1998 RZ_{42}	—	September 14, 1998	Socorro	LINEAR	·	2.2 km	MPC · JPL
44323	1998 RT_{44}	—	September 14, 1998	Socorro	LINEAR	EUN	4.9 km	MPC · JPL
44324	1998 RA_{45}	—	September 14, 1998	Socorro	LINEAR	·	8.6 km	MPC · JPL
44325	1998 RU_{45}	—	September 14, 1998	Socorro	LINEAR	HOF	7.5 km	MPC · JPL
44326	1998 RM_{47}	—	September 14, 1998	Socorro	LINEAR	·	2.1 km	MPC · JPL
44327	1998 RC_{48}	—	September 14, 1998	Socorro	LINEAR	(5)	3.1 km	MPC · JPL
44328	1998 RC_{55}	—	September 14, 1998	Socorro	LINEAR	·	5.1 km	MPC · JPL
44329	1998 RN_{58}	—	September 14, 1998	Socorro	LINEAR	·	4.9 km	MPC · JPL
44330	1998 RV_{58}	—	September 14, 1998	Socorro	LINEAR	·	4.2 km	MPC · JPL
44331	1998 RW_{58}	—	September 14, 1998	Socorro	LINEAR	EUN	3.6 km	MPC · JPL
44332	1998 RU_{60}	—	September 14, 1998	Socorro	LINEAR	·	3.4 km	MPC · JPL
44333	1998 RB_{63}	—	September 14, 1998	Socorro	LINEAR	ADE	6.3 km	MPC · JPL
44334	1998 RO_{63}	—	September 14, 1998	Socorro	LINEAR	·	3.9 km	MPC · JPL
44335	1998 RU_{63}	—	September 14, 1998	Socorro	LINEAR	EUN	3.5 km	MPC · JPL
44336	1998 RE_{64}	—	September 14, 1998	Socorro	LINEAR	·	3.0 km	MPC · JPL
44337	1998 RE_{65}	—	September 14, 1998	Socorro	LINEAR	(11882)	4.1 km	MPC · JPL
44338	1998 RM_{65}	—	September 14, 1998	Socorro	LINEAR	·	3.3 km	MPC · JPL
44339	1998 RV_{65}	—	September 14, 1998	Socorro	LINEAR	·	3.8 km	MPC · JPL
44340	1998 RH_{66}	—	September 14, 1998	Socorro	LINEAR	·	5.3 km	MPC · JPL
44341	1998 RX_{66}	—	September 14, 1998	Socorro	LINEAR	·	2.3 km	MPC · JPL
44342	1998 RJ_{67}	—	September 14, 1998	Socorro	LINEAR	·	8.8 km	MPC · JPL
44343	1998 RS_{67}	—	September 14, 1998	Socorro	LINEAR	·	3.4 km	MPC · JPL
44344	1998 RN_{68}	—	September 14, 1998	Socorro	LINEAR	·	4.4 km	MPC · JPL
44345	1998 RO_{73}	—	September 14, 1998	Socorro	LINEAR	·	3.6 km	MPC · JPL
44346	1998 RC_{74}	—	September 14, 1998	Socorro	LINEAR	·	8.4 km	MPC · JPL
44347	1998 RV_{74}	—	September 14, 1998	Socorro	LINEAR	·	3.0 km	MPC · JPL
44348	1998 RZ_{76}	—	September 14, 1998	Socorro	LINEAR	EUN	3.6 km	MPC · JPL
44349	1998 RN_{77}	—	September 14, 1998	Socorro	LINEAR	·	11 km	MPC · JPL
44350	1998 RY_{78}	—	September 14, 1998	Socorro	LINEAR	·	10 km	MPC · JPL
44351	1998 RA_{79}	—	September 14, 1998	Socorro	LINEAR	·	2.7 km	MPC · JPL
44352	1998 RY_{79}	—	September 14, 1998	Socorro	LINEAR	EOS	4.9 km	MPC · JPL
44353	1998 SB_{1}	—	September 16, 1998	Caussols	ODAS	·	6.3 km	MPC · JPL
44354	1998 SS_{2}	—	September 16, 1998	Nachi-Katsuura	Y. Shimizu, T. Urata	EUN	5.1 km	MPC · JPL
44355	1998 ST_{2}	—	September 18, 1998	Colleverde	V. S. Casulli	·	2.7 km	MPC · JPL
44356	1998 SL_{7}	—	September 20, 1998	Kitt Peak	Spacewatch	·	5.7 km	MPC · JPL
44357	1998 SS_{8}	—	September 20, 1998	Kitt Peak	Spacewatch	·	5.6 km	MPC · JPL
44358	1998 SX_{8}	—	September 20, 1998	Kitt Peak	Spacewatch	EUN	4.4 km	MPC · JPL
44359	1998 SM_{9}	—	September 17, 1998	Xinglong	SCAP	·	5.4 km	MPC · JPL
44360 Ferlet	1998 SK_{10}	Ferlet	September 18, 1998	Caussols	ODAS	·	5.0 km	MPC · JPL
44361	1998 SG_{13}	—	September 21, 1998	Caussols	ODAS	·	3.9 km	MPC · JPL
44362	1998 SM_{14}	—	September 17, 1998	Anderson Mesa	LONEOS	·	4.1 km	MPC · JPL
44363	1998 SS_{19}	—	September 20, 1998	Kitt Peak	Spacewatch	·	4.5 km	MPC · JPL
44364	1998 SA_{22}	—	September 23, 1998	Višnjan Observatory	Višnjan	·	2.1 km	MPC · JPL
44365	1998 SO_{22}	—	September 23, 1998	Višnjan Observatory	Višnjan	·	3.4 km	MPC · JPL
44366	1998 SQ_{23}	—	September 17, 1998	Anderson Mesa	LONEOS	WIT	3.3 km	MPC · JPL
44367	1998 SE_{25}	—	September 22, 1998	Anderson Mesa	LONEOS	EUN	3.6 km	MPC · JPL
44368 Andreafrigo	1998 SR_{26}	Andreafrigo	September 23, 1998	Stroncone	A.Vagnozzi	GEF	3.4 km	MPC · JPL
44369	1998 SX_{32}	—	September 23, 1998	Kitt Peak	Spacewatch	·	3.9 km	MPC · JPL
44370	1998 SK_{35}	—	September 27, 1998	Baton Rouge	W. R. Cooney Jr., Wefel, K.	·	3.2 km	MPC · JPL
44371	1998 SR_{37}	—	September 21, 1998	Kitt Peak	Spacewatch	·	7.0 km	MPC · JPL
44372	1998 SZ_{37}	—	September 23, 1998	Kitt Peak	Spacewatch	·	2.4 km	MPC · JPL
44373	1998 SU_{42}	—	September 17, 1998	Xinglong	SCAP	DOR	7.0 km	MPC · JPL
44374	1998 SY_{42}	—	September 20, 1998	Xinglong	SCAP	·	3.0 km	MPC · JPL
44375	1998 SG_{46}	—	September 25, 1998	Kitt Peak	Spacewatch	·	4.2 km	MPC · JPL
44376	1998 SJ_{48}	—	September 27, 1998	Kitt Peak	Spacewatch	KOR	3.1 km	MPC · JPL
44377	1998 SD_{54}	—	September 16, 1998	Anderson Mesa	LONEOS	·	4.5 km	MPC · JPL
44378	1998 SC_{56}	—	September 16, 1998	Anderson Mesa	LONEOS	·	3.9 km	MPC · JPL
44379	1998 SH_{56}	—	September 16, 1998	Anderson Mesa	LONEOS	·	3.5 km	MPC · JPL
44380	1998 SS_{56}	—	September 17, 1998	Anderson Mesa	LONEOS	(5)	2.8 km	MPC · JPL
44381	1998 SV_{56}	—	September 17, 1998	Anderson Mesa	LONEOS	·	4.0 km	MPC · JPL
44382	1998 SA_{59}	—	September 17, 1998	Anderson Mesa	LONEOS	·	7.2 km	MPC · JPL
44383	1998 SL_{60}	—	September 17, 1998	Anderson Mesa	LONEOS	KOR	5.6 km	MPC · JPL
44384	1998 SJ_{61}	—	September 17, 1998	Anderson Mesa	LONEOS	·	4.7 km	MPC · JPL
44385	1998 SR_{61}	—	September 17, 1998	Anderson Mesa	LONEOS	·	4.7 km	MPC · JPL
44386	1998 SV_{61}	—	September 17, 1998	Anderson Mesa	LONEOS	·	6.1 km	MPC · JPL
44387	1998 ST_{62}	—	September 25, 1998	Xinglong	SCAP	EUN	2.9 km	MPC · JPL
44388	1998 SK_{63}	—	September 27, 1998	Xinglong	SCAP	·	7.2 km	MPC · JPL
44389	1998 SO_{63}	—	September 29, 1998	Xinglong	SCAP	EOS	6.1 km	MPC · JPL
44390	1998 ST_{63}	—	September 29, 1998	Višnjan Observatory	Višnjan	·	3.8 km	MPC · JPL
44391	1998 SH_{64}	—	September 20, 1998	La Silla	E. W. Elst	·	3.8 km	MPC · JPL
44392	1998 SY_{65}	—	September 20, 1998	La Silla	E. W. Elst	AGN	4.2 km	MPC · JPL
44393	1998 SJ_{66}	—	September 20, 1998	La Silla	E. W. Elst	·	8.1 km	MPC · JPL
44394	1998 ST_{66}	—	September 20, 1998	La Silla	E. W. Elst	DOR	6.1 km	MPC · JPL
44395	1998 SE_{68}	—	September 19, 1998	Socorro	LINEAR	·	4.5 km	MPC · JPL
44396	1998 SF_{68}	—	September 19, 1998	Socorro	LINEAR	MAR	2.9 km	MPC · JPL
44397	1998 SG_{71}	—	September 21, 1998	La Silla	E. W. Elst	·	5.6 km	MPC · JPL
44398	1998 SD_{75}	—	September 21, 1998	La Silla	E. W. Elst	·	4.6 km	MPC · JPL
44399	1998 SZ_{84}	—	September 26, 1998	Socorro	LINEAR	·	4.3 km	MPC · JPL
44400	1998 ST_{97}	—	September 26, 1998	Socorro	LINEAR	NEM	5.0 km	MPC · JPL

== 44401–44500 ==
back to top

Designation			Discovery			Properties		Ref
Permanent	Provisional	Named after	Date	Site	Discoverer(s)	Category	Diam.	Ref
44401	1998 SD_{106}	—	September 26, 1998	Socorro	LINEAR	EUN	3.4 km	MPC · JPL
44402	1998 SX_{107}	—	September 26, 1998	Socorro	LINEAR	·	6.6 km	MPC · JPL
44403	1998 SH_{111}	—	September 26, 1998	Socorro	LINEAR	·	3.4 km	MPC · JPL
44404	1998 SB_{113}	—	September 26, 1998	Socorro	LINEAR	·	3.6 km	MPC · JPL
44405	1998 SS_{123}	—	September 26, 1998	Socorro	LINEAR	TEL	5.8 km	MPC · JPL
44406	1998 SU_{127}	—	September 26, 1998	Socorro	LINEAR	·	3.7 km	MPC · JPL
44407	1998 SO_{132}	—	September 26, 1998	Socorro	LINEAR	·	5.5 km	MPC · JPL
44408	1998 SK_{133}	—	September 26, 1998	Socorro	LINEAR	·	4.2 km	MPC · JPL
44409	1998 SW_{134}	—	September 26, 1998	Socorro	LINEAR	·	4.8 km	MPC · JPL
44410	1998 SQ_{137}	—	September 26, 1998	Socorro	LINEAR	HOF	9.5 km	MPC · JPL
44411	1998 SX_{138}	—	September 26, 1998	Socorro	LINEAR	·	7.1 km	MPC · JPL
44412	1998 SJ_{139}	—	September 26, 1998	Socorro	LINEAR	(5)	3.0 km	MPC · JPL
44413	1998 SR_{139}	—	September 26, 1998	Socorro	LINEAR	·	9.9 km	MPC · JPL
44414	1998 SC_{141}	—	September 26, 1998	Socorro	LINEAR	ADE	7.3 km	MPC · JPL
44415	1998 SF_{143}	—	September 26, 1998	Socorro	LINEAR	·	4.7 km	MPC · JPL
44416	1998 ST_{143}	—	September 18, 1998	La Silla	E. W. Elst	·	5.4 km	MPC · JPL
44417	1998 SS_{146}	—	September 20, 1998	La Silla	E. W. Elst	EOS	7.5 km	MPC · JPL
44418	1998 SY_{146}	—	September 20, 1998	La Silla	E. W. Elst	·	4.8 km	MPC · JPL
44419	1998 SM_{151}	—	September 26, 1998	Socorro	LINEAR	PAD	5.2 km	MPC · JPL
44420	1998 SC_{155}	—	September 26, 1998	Socorro	LINEAR	AGN	2.9 km	MPC · JPL
44421	1998 SL_{156}	—	September 26, 1998	Socorro	LINEAR	DOR	6.4 km	MPC · JPL
44422	1998 SD_{159}	—	September 26, 1998	Socorro	LINEAR	AGN	4.8 km	MPC · JPL
44423	1998 SP_{162}	—	September 26, 1998	Socorro	LINEAR	·	5.2 km	MPC · JPL
44424	1998 TL_{1}	—	October 12, 1998	Kitt Peak	Spacewatch	·	2.9 km	MPC · JPL
44425	1998 TY_{1}	—	October 13, 1998	Reedy Creek	J. Broughton	·	3.2 km	MPC · JPL
44426	1998 TJ_{4}	—	October 12, 1998	Kitt Peak	Spacewatch	·	8.6 km	MPC · JPL
44427	1998 TC_{5}	—	October 13, 1998	Višnjan Observatory	K. Korlević	·	9.6 km	MPC · JPL
44428	1998 TF_{5}	—	October 13, 1998	Višnjan Observatory	K. Korlević	·	2.1 km	MPC · JPL
44429	1998 TU_{5}	—	October 13, 1998	Višnjan Observatory	K. Korlević	·	3.0 km	MPC · JPL
44430	1998 TZ_{6}	—	October 15, 1998	Reedy Creek	J. Broughton	EUN	3.4 km	MPC · JPL
44431	1998 TJ_{18}	—	October 14, 1998	Xinglong	SCAP	·	2.4 km	MPC · JPL
44432	1998 TP_{19}	—	October 15, 1998	Xinglong	SCAP	URS	9.8 km	MPC · JPL
44433	1998 TL_{30}	—	October 10, 1998	Anderson Mesa	LONEOS	(21344)	4.1 km	MPC · JPL
44434	1998 UD_{4}	—	October 20, 1998	Višnjan Observatory	K. Korlević	·	3.0 km	MPC · JPL
44435	1998 UB_{7}	—	October 22, 1998	Višnjan Observatory	K. Korlević	·	4.4 km	MPC · JPL
44436	1998 UE_{7}	—	October 22, 1998	Višnjan Observatory	K. Korlević	·	3.6 km	MPC · JPL
44437	1998 UN_{7}	—	October 22, 1998	Višnjan Observatory	K. Korlević	·	1.8 km	MPC · JPL
44438	1998 UG_{8}	—	October 23, 1998	Višnjan Observatory	K. Korlević	·	20 km	MPC · JPL
44439	1998 UR_{8}	—	October 17, 1998	Xinglong	SCAP	·	3.6 km	MPC · JPL
44440	1998 UM_{15}	—	October 23, 1998	Višnjan Observatory	K. Korlević	·	2.0 km	MPC · JPL
44441	1998 UO_{16}	—	October 24, 1998	Višnjan Observatory	K. Korlević	·	5.0 km	MPC · JPL
44442	1998 UG_{17}	—	October 17, 1998	Xinglong	SCAP	PAD	6.1 km	MPC · JPL
44443	1998 UY_{19}	—	October 26, 1998	Višnjan Observatory	K. Korlević	TIR · fast	9.1 km	MPC · JPL
44444	1998 UZ_{19}	—	October 26, 1998	Višnjan Observatory	K. Korlević	·	4.7 km	MPC · JPL
44445	1998 UX_{20}	—	October 29, 1998	Višnjan Observatory	K. Korlević	EUN	3.3 km	MPC · JPL
44446	1998 UJ_{21}	—	October 28, 1998	Socorro	LINEAR	·	3.9 km	MPC · JPL
44447	1998 UM_{21}	—	October 28, 1998	Socorro	LINEAR	EUN	3.7 km	MPC · JPL
44448	1998 UU_{22}	—	October 31, 1998	Gekko	T. Kagawa	EOS	6.5 km	MPC · JPL
44449	1998 UK_{24}	—	October 18, 1998	Anderson Mesa	LONEOS	·	4.5 km	MPC · JPL
44450	1998 UB_{25}	—	October 18, 1998	La Silla	E. W. Elst	·	4.9 km	MPC · JPL
44451	1998 UT_{30}	—	October 18, 1998	La Silla	E. W. Elst	·	6.1 km	MPC · JPL
44452	1998 UO_{32}	—	October 30, 1998	Xinglong	SCAP	·	5.6 km	MPC · JPL
44453	1998 UL_{40}	—	October 28, 1998	Socorro	LINEAR	·	3.5 km	MPC · JPL
44454	1998 UE_{43}	—	October 28, 1998	Socorro	LINEAR	·	3.8 km	MPC · JPL
44455 Artdula	1998 VK	Artdula	November 7, 1998	Goodricke-Pigott	R. A. Tucker	EUN	2.7 km	MPC · JPL
44456 Vidal-Madjar	1998 VP_{4}	Vidal-Madjar	November 11, 1998	Caussols	ODAS	EOS	5.6 km	MPC · JPL
44457	1998 VG_{7}	—	November 10, 1998	Socorro	LINEAR	·	2.7 km	MPC · JPL
44458	1998 VJ_{8}	—	November 10, 1998	Socorro	LINEAR	·	4.5 km	MPC · JPL
44459	1998 VW_{11}	—	November 10, 1998	Socorro	LINEAR	·	5.0 km	MPC · JPL
44460	1998 VC_{15}	—	November 10, 1998	Socorro	LINEAR	·	4.0 km	MPC · JPL
44461	1998 VH_{17}	—	November 10, 1998	Socorro	LINEAR	GEF	4.2 km	MPC · JPL
44462	1998 VU_{17}	—	November 10, 1998	Socorro	LINEAR	·	5.5 km	MPC · JPL
44463	1998 VT_{18}	—	November 10, 1998	Socorro	LINEAR	LIX	13 km	MPC · JPL
44464	1998 VN_{21}	—	November 10, 1998	Socorro	LINEAR	(5)	2.4 km	MPC · JPL
44465	1998 VR_{23}	—	November 10, 1998	Socorro	LINEAR	·	5.3 km	MPC · JPL
44466	1998 VT_{23}	—	November 10, 1998	Socorro	LINEAR	·	6.5 km	MPC · JPL
44467	1998 VU_{27}	—	November 10, 1998	Socorro	LINEAR	GEF	3.5 km	MPC · JPL
44468	1998 VH_{34}	—	November 11, 1998	Fair Oaks Ranch	J. V. McClusky	·	8.7 km	MPC · JPL
44469	1998 VP_{34}	—	November 10, 1998	Caussols	ODAS	KOR	3.0 km	MPC · JPL
44470	1998 VZ_{35}	—	November 12, 1998	Xinglong	SCAP	·	6.0 km	MPC · JPL
44471	1998 VB_{37}	—	November 10, 1998	Socorro	LINEAR	·	2.9 km	MPC · JPL
44472	1998 VH_{53}	—	November 14, 1998	Socorro	LINEAR	EUN	3.5 km	MPC · JPL
44473 Randytatum	1998 WB	Randytatum	November 16, 1998	Catalina	CSS	·	12 km	MPC · JPL
44474	1998 WE	—	November 16, 1998	Zeno	T. Stafford	THM	8.3 km	MPC · JPL
44475 Hikarumasai	1998 WF	Hikarumasai	November 16, 1998	Goodricke-Pigott	R. A. Tucker	·	4.6 km	MPC · JPL
44476	1998 WN_{3}	—	November 19, 1998	Oizumi	T. Kobayashi	EOS	7.2 km	MPC · JPL
44477	1998 WL_{5}	—	November 20, 1998	Gekko	T. Kagawa	KOR	3.5 km	MPC · JPL
44478	1998 WK_{6}	—	November 23, 1998	Zeno	T. Stafford	·	6.0 km	MPC · JPL
44479 Oláheszter	1998 WS_{8}	Oláheszter	November 24, 1998	Piszkéstető	L. Kiss, K. Sárneczky	·	5.9 km	MPC · JPL
44480	1998 WU_{9}	—	November 16, 1998	Socorro	LINEAR	·	3.4 km	MPC · JPL
44481	1998 WN_{10}	—	November 21, 1998	Socorro	LINEAR	·	5.4 km	MPC · JPL
44482	1998 WQ_{14}	—	November 21, 1998	Socorro	LINEAR	·	7.0 km	MPC · JPL
44483	1998 WL_{16}	—	November 21, 1998	Socorro	LINEAR	·	4.2 km	MPC · JPL
44484	1998 WV_{17}	—	November 21, 1998	Socorro	LINEAR	·	5.4 km	MPC · JPL
44485	1998 WZ_{17}	—	November 21, 1998	Socorro	LINEAR	·	9.7 km	MPC · JPL
44486	1998 WZ_{19}	—	November 29, 1998	Woomera	F. B. Zoltowski	·	3.6 km	MPC · JPL
44487 Miyaharaterumasa	1998 WC_{20}	Miyaharaterumasa	November 26, 1998	Uto	F. Uto	·	7.2 km	MPC · JPL
44488	1998 WO_{20}	—	November 18, 1998	Socorro	LINEAR	MAR	2.4 km	MPC · JPL
44489	1998 WK_{22}	—	November 18, 1998	Socorro	LINEAR	EOS	5.1 km	MPC · JPL
44490	1998 WL_{23}	—	November 18, 1998	Socorro	LINEAR	KOR	5.1 km	MPC · JPL
44491	1998 WU_{30}	—	November 28, 1998	Višnjan Observatory	K. Korlević	·	12 km	MPC · JPL
44492	1998 WE_{31}	—	November 19, 1998	Catalina	CSS	LUT	12 km	MPC · JPL
44493	1998 WT_{40}	—	November 16, 1998	Socorro	LINEAR	·	6.6 km	MPC · JPL
44494	1998 WD_{41}	—	November 18, 1998	Socorro	LINEAR	·	3.7 km	MPC · JPL
44495	1998 XL_{4}	—	December 12, 1998	Socorro	LINEAR	·	6.8 km	MPC · JPL
44496	1998 XM_{5}	—	December 8, 1998	Višnjan Observatory	K. Korlević	·	10 km	MPC · JPL
44497	1998 XJ_{11}	—	December 13, 1998	Oizumi	T. Kobayashi	·	7.5 km	MPC · JPL
44498	1998 XL_{11}	—	December 13, 1998	Oizumi	T. Kobayashi	THM	7.5 km	MPC · JPL
44499	1998 XV_{16}	—	December 15, 1998	Višnjan Observatory	K. Korlević	·	3.0 km	MPC · JPL
44500	1998 XT_{17}	—	December 12, 1998	Dynic	Ikari, Y.	HYG	8.6 km	MPC · JPL

== 44501–44600 ==
back to top

Designation			Discovery			Properties		Ref
Permanent	Provisional	Named after	Date	Site	Discoverer(s)	Category	Diam.	Ref
44501	1998 XN_{21}	—	December 10, 1998	Kitt Peak	Spacewatch	·	10 km	MPC · JPL
44502	1998 XQ_{27}	—	December 14, 1998	Socorro	LINEAR	·	3.9 km	MPC · JPL
44503	1998 XR_{27}	—	December 14, 1998	Socorro	LINEAR	·	4.6 km	MPC · JPL
44504	1998 XX_{34}	—	December 14, 1998	Socorro	LINEAR	ADE	9.9 km	MPC · JPL
44505	1998 XT_{38}	—	December 14, 1998	Socorro	LINEAR	·	7.7 km	MPC · JPL
44506	1998 XS_{39}	—	December 14, 1998	Socorro	LINEAR	·	6.9 km	MPC · JPL
44507	1998 XM_{40}	—	December 14, 1998	Socorro	LINEAR	·	4.8 km	MPC · JPL
44508	1998 XH_{45}	—	December 14, 1998	Socorro	LINEAR	HYG	8.6 km	MPC · JPL
44509	1998 XJ_{46}	—	December 14, 1998	Socorro	LINEAR	·	12 km	MPC · JPL
44510	1998 XB_{51}	—	December 14, 1998	Socorro	LINEAR	EOS	7.4 km	MPC · JPL
44511	1998 XC_{51}	—	December 14, 1998	Socorro	LINEAR	·	15 km	MPC · JPL
44512	1998 XM_{58}	—	December 15, 1998	Socorro	LINEAR	CLO	6.8 km	MPC · JPL
44513	1998 XT_{62}	—	December 12, 1998	Socorro	LINEAR	·	15 km	MPC · JPL
44514	1998 XE_{65}	—	December 14, 1998	Socorro	LINEAR	·	3.7 km	MPC · JPL
44515	1998 XR_{74}	—	December 14, 1998	Socorro	LINEAR	·	12 km	MPC · JPL
44516	1998 XE_{83}	—	December 15, 1998	Socorro	LINEAR	·	5.2 km	MPC · JPL
44517	1998 XF_{83}	—	December 15, 1998	Socorro	LINEAR	EOS	4.6 km	MPC · JPL
44518	1998 XQ_{86}	—	December 15, 1998	Socorro	LINEAR	EOS	5.8 km	MPC · JPL
44519	1998 XY_{91}	—	December 15, 1998	Socorro	LINEAR	TIR ·	12 km	MPC · JPL
44520	1998 XC_{92}	—	December 15, 1998	Socorro	LINEAR	·	8.1 km	MPC · JPL
44521	1998 XZ_{93}	—	December 15, 1998	Socorro	LINEAR	·	7.5 km	MPC · JPL
44522	1998 YP_{1}	—	December 16, 1998	Višnjan Observatory	K. Korlević	·	2.5 km	MPC · JPL
44523	1998 YR_{3}	—	December 16, 1998	Višnjan Observatory	K. Korlević	·	3.2 km	MPC · JPL
44524	1998 YZ_{3}	—	December 19, 1998	Oizumi	T. Kobayashi	EOS	8.3 km	MPC · JPL
44525	1998 YE_{4}	—	December 19, 1998	Oizumi	T. Kobayashi	·	14 km	MPC · JPL
44526	1998 YN_{4}	—	December 16, 1998	Socorro	LINEAR	MAR	3.4 km	MPC · JPL
44527 Tonnon	1998 YC_{6}	Tonnon	December 22, 1998	Cocoa	I. P. Griffin	·	7.0 km	MPC · JPL
44528	1998 YZ_{6}	—	December 22, 1998	Višnjan Observatory	K. Korlević	GEF	4.7 km	MPC · JPL
44529	1998 YP_{7}	—	December 22, 1998	Reedy Creek	J. Broughton	EOS	4.2 km	MPC · JPL
44530 Horáková	1998 YC_{8}	Horáková	December 25, 1998	Kleť	J. Tichá, M. Tichý	EUN · slow?	7.1 km	MPC · JPL
44531	1998 YR_{8}	—	December 17, 1998	Xinglong	SCAP	·	13 km	MPC · JPL
44532	1998 YA_{9}	—	December 23, 1998	Xinglong	SCAP	EOS	6.4 km	MPC · JPL
44533	1998 YN_{9}	—	December 24, 1998	Višnjan Observatory	K. Korlević, M. Jurić	·	5.4 km	MPC · JPL
44534	1998 YZ_{9}	—	December 25, 1998	Višnjan Observatory	K. Korlević, M. Jurić	·	3.0 km	MPC · JPL
44535	1998 YN_{15}	—	December 22, 1998	Kitt Peak	Spacewatch	·	6.3 km	MPC · JPL
44536	1998 YY_{27}	—	December 19, 1998	Socorro	LINEAR	(18466)	5.0 km	MPC · JPL
44537	1999 AG	—	January 5, 1999	Višnjan Observatory	K. Korlević	·	2.1 km	MPC · JPL
44538	1999 AO_{2}	—	January 9, 1999	Oizumi	T. Kobayashi	·	8.4 km	MPC · JPL
44539	1999 AH_{4}	—	January 9, 1999	Višnjan Observatory	K. Korlević	·	2.1 km	MPC · JPL
44540	1999 AH_{6}	—	January 8, 1999	Socorro	LINEAR	EUN	4.6 km	MPC · JPL
44541	1999 AV_{6}	—	January 9, 1999	Višnjan Observatory	K. Korlević	·	2.6 km	MPC · JPL
44542	1999 AD_{7}	—	January 9, 1999	Višnjan Observatory	K. Korlević	·	7.5 km	MPC · JPL
44543	1999 AG_{23}	—	January 9, 1999	Anderson Mesa	LONEOS	·	6.3 km	MPC · JPL
44544	1999 AO_{23}	—	January 14, 1999	Anderson Mesa	LONEOS	·	6.5 km	MPC · JPL
44545	1999 AJ_{24}	—	January 13, 1999	Fair Oaks Ranch	J. V. McClusky	·	8.0 km	MPC · JPL
44546	1999 BR	—	January 16, 1999	Višnjan Observatory	K. Korlević	EOS	6.8 km	MPC · JPL
44547	1999 BC_{3}	—	January 19, 1999	Needville	Rivich, K.	CYB	11 km	MPC · JPL
44548	1999 BQ_{5}	—	January 20, 1999	Višnjan Observatory	K. Korlević	EOS	6.1 km	MPC · JPL
44549	1999 BH_{13}	—	January 24, 1999	Višnjan Observatory	K. Korlević	3:2	13 km	MPC · JPL
44550	1999 BL_{23}	—	January 18, 1999	Socorro	LINEAR	·	14 km	MPC · JPL
44551	1999 BV_{27}	—	January 17, 1999	Kitt Peak	Spacewatch	LIX	13 km	MPC · JPL
44552	1999 BL_{34}	—	January 17, 1999	Kitt Peak	Spacewatch	·	12 km	MPC · JPL
44553	1999 CH_{5}	—	February 12, 1999	Gekko	T. Kagawa	·	10 km	MPC · JPL
44554	1999 CQ_{9}	—	February 14, 1999	Oizumi	T. Kobayashi	·	4.5 km	MPC · JPL
44555	1999 CF_{11}	—	February 12, 1999	Socorro	LINEAR	H	1.6 km	MPC · JPL
44556	1999 CD_{23}	—	February 10, 1999	Socorro	LINEAR	EUN	5.2 km	MPC · JPL
44557	1999 CZ_{23}	—	February 10, 1999	Socorro	LINEAR	·	8.5 km	MPC · JPL
44558	1999 CF_{35}	—	February 10, 1999	Socorro	LINEAR	·	11 km	MPC · JPL
44559	1999 CC_{38}	—	February 10, 1999	Socorro	LINEAR	·	7.8 km	MPC · JPL
44560	1999 CM_{42}	—	February 10, 1999	Socorro	LINEAR	·	3.8 km	MPC · JPL
44561	1999 CF_{53}	—	February 10, 1999	Socorro	LINEAR	·	7.1 km	MPC · JPL
44562	1999 CH_{57}	—	February 10, 1999	Socorro	LINEAR	THM	6.8 km	MPC · JPL
44563	1999 CX_{59}	—	February 12, 1999	Socorro	LINEAR	·	6.7 km	MPC · JPL
44564	1999 CZ_{60}	—	February 12, 1999	Socorro	LINEAR	·	3.2 km	MPC · JPL
44565	1999 CF_{84}	—	February 10, 1999	Socorro	LINEAR	·	4.9 km	MPC · JPL
44566	1999 CK_{103}	—	February 12, 1999	Socorro	LINEAR	T_{j} (2.97) · CYB	28 km	MPC · JPL
44567	1999 CL_{111}	—	February 12, 1999	Socorro	LINEAR	NYS	1.5 km	MPC · JPL
44568	1999 CR_{114}	—	February 12, 1999	Socorro	LINEAR	HYG	7.4 km	MPC · JPL
44569	1999 CG_{133}	—	February 7, 1999	Kitt Peak	Spacewatch	V	2.0 km	MPC · JPL
44570 Yuribeletsky	1999 FX_{5}	Yuribeletsky	March 16, 1999	Caussols	ODAS	EUN	4.9 km	MPC · JPL
44571	1999 FQ_{15}	—	March 20, 1999	Kitt Peak	Spacewatch	·	3.3 km	MPC · JPL
44572	1999 FW_{38}	—	March 20, 1999	Socorro	LINEAR	·	4.5 km	MPC · JPL
44573	1999 FZ_{51}	—	March 20, 1999	Socorro	LINEAR	·	8.0 km	MPC · JPL
44574 Lavoratti	1999 GF_{1}	Lavoratti	April 4, 1999	San Marcello	L. Tesi, M. Tombelli	·	3.8 km	MPC · JPL
44575	1999 GG_{3}	—	April 7, 1999	Kitt Peak	Spacewatch	·	3.2 km	MPC · JPL
44576	1999 GJ_{10}	—	April 11, 1999	Kitt Peak	Spacewatch	fast	4.6 km	MPC · JPL
44577	1999 GJ_{17}	—	April 15, 1999	Socorro	LINEAR	·	5.0 km	MPC · JPL
44578	1999 GL_{25}	—	April 6, 1999	Socorro	LINEAR	SUL	5.6 km	MPC · JPL
44579	1999 GR_{25}	—	April 6, 1999	Socorro	LINEAR	KOR	4.9 km	MPC · JPL
44580	1999 GY_{25}	—	April 7, 1999	Socorro	LINEAR	·	2.6 km	MPC · JPL
44581	1999 GB_{40}	—	April 12, 1999	Socorro	LINEAR	·	1.5 km	MPC · JPL
44582	1999 JE_{10}	—	May 8, 1999	Catalina	CSS	EOS	4.5 km	MPC · JPL
44583	1999 JT_{11}	—	May 12, 1999	Socorro	LINEAR	H	1.6 km	MPC · JPL
44584	1999 JO_{21}	—	May 10, 1999	Socorro	LINEAR	NYS	2.9 km	MPC · JPL
44585	1999 JT_{28}	—	May 10, 1999	Socorro	LINEAR	NYS	1.9 km	MPC · JPL
44586	1999 JJ_{70}	—	May 12, 1999	Socorro	LINEAR	WIT	2.7 km	MPC · JPL
44587	1999 JQ_{70}	—	May 12, 1999	Socorro	LINEAR	·	1.6 km	MPC · JPL
44588	1999 JF_{124}	—	May 14, 1999	Socorro	LINEAR	H	1.4 km	MPC · JPL
44589	1999 LQ_{5}	—	June 11, 1999	Socorro	LINEAR	H	2.0 km	MPC · JPL
44590	1999 LC_{16}	—	June 12, 1999	Socorro	LINEAR	H	1.3 km	MPC · JPL
44591	1999 NF_{40}	—	July 14, 1999	Socorro	LINEAR	·	2.7 km	MPC · JPL
44592	1999 OM	—	July 17, 1999	Reedy Creek	J. Broughton	·	4.0 km	MPC · JPL
44593	1999 OG_{3}	—	July 22, 1999	Socorro	LINEAR	PHO	2.6 km	MPC · JPL
44594	1999 OX_{3}	—	July 21, 1999	Mauna Kea	J. J. Kavelaars, B. Gladman, M. J. Holman, Petit, J.-M.	centaur	135 km	MPC · JPL
44595	1999 PE	—	August 4, 1999	Reedy Creek	J. Broughton	V	1.7 km	MPC · JPL
44596	1999 PF	—	August 4, 1999	Reedy Creek	J. Broughton	·	1.9 km	MPC · JPL
44597 Thoreau	1999 PW	Thoreau	August 6, 1999	Kleť	J. Tichá, M. Tichý	·	2.2 km	MPC · JPL
44598	1999 PL_{6}	—	August 7, 1999	Anderson Mesa	LONEOS	·	2.7 km	MPC · JPL
44599	1999 RA_{2}	—	September 6, 1999	Višnjan Observatory	K. Korlević	·	1.9 km	MPC · JPL
44600	1999 RU_{10}	—	September 7, 1999	Socorro	LINEAR	H	1.9 km	MPC · JPL

== 44601–44700 ==
back to top

Designation			Discovery			Properties		Ref
Permanent	Provisional	Named after	Date	Site	Discoverer(s)	Category	Diam.	Ref
44601	1999 RM_{12}	—	September 7, 1999	Socorro	LINEAR	·	2.6 km	MPC · JPL
44602	1999 RN_{12}	—	September 7, 1999	Socorro	LINEAR	V	1.9 km	MPC · JPL
44603	1999 RT_{12}	—	September 7, 1999	Socorro	LINEAR	·	3.0 km	MPC · JPL
44604	1999 RN_{14}	—	September 7, 1999	Socorro	LINEAR	·	2.5 km	MPC · JPL
44605	1999 RM_{16}	—	September 7, 1999	Socorro	LINEAR	·	2.1 km	MPC · JPL
44606	1999 RQ_{17}	—	September 7, 1999	Socorro	LINEAR	·	1.7 km	MPC · JPL
44607	1999 RT_{17}	—	September 7, 1999	Socorro	LINEAR	·	2.7 km	MPC · JPL
44608	1999 RR_{18}	—	September 7, 1999	Socorro	LINEAR	·	3.0 km	MPC · JPL
44609	1999 RW_{18}	—	September 7, 1999	Socorro	LINEAR	·	2.7 km	MPC · JPL
44610	1999 RW_{24}	—	September 7, 1999	Socorro	LINEAR	·	2.0 km	MPC · JPL
44611	1999 RO_{25}	—	September 7, 1999	Socorro	LINEAR	·	2.1 km	MPC · JPL
44612	1999 RP_{27}	—	September 7, 1999	Višnjan Observatory	K. Korlević	·	2.0 km	MPC · JPL
44613 Rudolf	1999 RU_{31}	Rudolf	September 8, 1999	Ondřejov	P. Pravec, P. Kušnirák	·	3.8 km	MPC · JPL
44614	1999 RM_{34}	—	September 10, 1999	Višnjan Observatory	K. Korlević	·	2.2 km	MPC · JPL
44615	1999 RQ_{34}	—	September 11, 1999	Višnjan Observatory	K. Korlević	(2076)	2.1 km	MPC · JPL
44616	1999 RT_{34}	—	September 10, 1999	Ondřejov	P. Kušnirák, P. Pravec	NYS	2.1 km	MPC · JPL
44617	1999 RY_{37}	—	September 12, 1999	Višnjan Observatory	K. Korlević	·	2.2 km	MPC · JPL
44618	1999 RO_{38}	—	September 13, 1999	Višnjan Observatory	K. Korlević	·	2.3 km	MPC · JPL
44619	1999 RO_{42}	—	September 14, 1999	Višnjan Observatory	K. Korlević	fast	2.9 km	MPC · JPL
44620	1999 RS_{43}	—	September 12, 1999	Višnjan Observatory	K. Korlević	moon	2.1 km	MPC · JPL
44621	1999 RV_{48}	—	September 7, 1999	Socorro	LINEAR	·	2.0 km	MPC · JPL
44622	1999 RJ_{51}	—	September 7, 1999	Socorro	LINEAR	·	1.7 km	MPC · JPL
44623	1999 RP_{55}	—	September 7, 1999	Socorro	LINEAR	·	3.1 km	MPC · JPL
44624	1999 RS_{57}	—	September 7, 1999	Socorro	LINEAR	·	2.0 km	MPC · JPL
44625	1999 RS_{63}	—	September 7, 1999	Socorro	LINEAR	·	6.8 km	MPC · JPL
44626	1999 RU_{65}	—	September 7, 1999	Socorro	LINEAR	·	2.1 km	MPC · JPL
44627	1999 RN_{71}	—	September 7, 1999	Socorro	LINEAR	·	3.6 km	MPC · JPL
44628	1999 RQ_{75}	—	September 7, 1999	Socorro	LINEAR	·	1.8 km	MPC · JPL
44629	1999 RT_{83}	—	September 7, 1999	Socorro	LINEAR	·	2.3 km	MPC · JPL
44630	1999 RY_{83}	—	September 7, 1999	Socorro	LINEAR	·	1.7 km	MPC · JPL
44631	1999 RT_{87}	—	September 7, 1999	Socorro	LINEAR	·	3.5 km	MPC · JPL
44632	1999 RZ_{88}	—	September 7, 1999	Socorro	LINEAR	·	2.7 km	MPC · JPL
44633	1999 RB_{90}	—	September 7, 1999	Socorro	LINEAR	V	2.5 km	MPC · JPL
44634	1999 RZ_{94}	—	September 7, 1999	Socorro	LINEAR	·	2.3 km	MPC · JPL
44635	1999 RO_{97}	—	September 7, 1999	Socorro	LINEAR	·	2.3 km	MPC · JPL
44636	1999 RQ_{103}	—	September 8, 1999	Socorro	LINEAR	V	2.1 km	MPC · JPL
44637	1999 RN_{105}	—	September 8, 1999	Socorro	LINEAR	·	2.9 km	MPC · JPL
44638	1999 RA_{109}	—	September 8, 1999	Socorro	LINEAR	·	1.4 km	MPC · JPL
44639	1999 RM_{109}	—	September 8, 1999	Socorro	LINEAR	·	4.0 km	MPC · JPL
44640	1999 RQ_{110}	—	September 8, 1999	Socorro	LINEAR	·	2.4 km	MPC · JPL
44641	1999 RZ_{111}	—	September 9, 1999	Socorro	LINEAR	H	1.3 km	MPC · JPL
44642	1999 RL_{114}	—	September 9, 1999	Socorro	LINEAR	·	1.7 km	MPC · JPL
44643	1999 RS_{114}	—	September 9, 1999	Socorro	LINEAR	·	2.3 km	MPC · JPL
44644	1999 RY_{114}	—	September 9, 1999	Socorro	LINEAR	·	2.3 km	MPC · JPL
44645	1999 RC_{118}	—	September 9, 1999	Socorro	LINEAR	V	2.1 km	MPC · JPL
44646	1999 RN_{121}	—	September 9, 1999	Socorro	LINEAR	V	1.4 km	MPC · JPL
44647	1999 RA_{129}	—	September 9, 1999	Socorro	LINEAR	·	3.4 km	MPC · JPL
44648	1999 RN_{140}	—	September 9, 1999	Socorro	LINEAR	NYS	1.9 km	MPC · JPL
44649	1999 RY_{141}	—	September 9, 1999	Socorro	LINEAR	·	1.5 km	MPC · JPL
44650	1999 RF_{143}	—	September 9, 1999	Socorro	LINEAR	·	1.8 km	MPC · JPL
44651	1999 RB_{148}	—	September 9, 1999	Socorro	LINEAR	·	2.1 km	MPC · JPL
44652	1999 RC_{150}	—	September 9, 1999	Socorro	LINEAR	·	2.3 km	MPC · JPL
44653	1999 RO_{151}	—	September 9, 1999	Socorro	LINEAR	·	3.6 km	MPC · JPL
44654	1999 RR_{155}	—	September 9, 1999	Socorro	LINEAR	·	1.9 km	MPC · JPL
44655	1999 RQ_{158}	—	September 9, 1999	Socorro	LINEAR	·	2.0 km	MPC · JPL
44656	1999 RU_{159}	—	September 9, 1999	Socorro	LINEAR	·	3.5 km	MPC · JPL
44657	1999 RK_{163}	—	September 9, 1999	Socorro	LINEAR	·	3.5 km	MPC · JPL
44658	1999 RD_{168}	—	September 9, 1999	Socorro	LINEAR	·	2.0 km	MPC · JPL
44659	1999 RJ_{169}	—	September 9, 1999	Socorro	LINEAR	V	1.6 km	MPC · JPL
44660	1999 RQ_{169}	—	September 9, 1999	Socorro	LINEAR	·	2.4 km	MPC · JPL
44661	1999 RX_{169}	—	September 9, 1999	Socorro	LINEAR	·	2.5 km	MPC · JPL
44662	1999 RV_{170}	—	September 9, 1999	Socorro	LINEAR	·	1.4 km	MPC · JPL
44663	1999 RS_{171}	—	September 9, 1999	Socorro	LINEAR	·	1.9 km	MPC · JPL
44664	1999 RX_{171}	—	September 9, 1999	Socorro	LINEAR	·	2.2 km	MPC · JPL
44665	1999 RF_{174}	—	September 9, 1999	Socorro	LINEAR	·	2.1 km	MPC · JPL
44666	1999 RX_{176}	—	September 9, 1999	Socorro	LINEAR	·	1.7 km	MPC · JPL
44667	1999 RB_{179}	—	September 9, 1999	Socorro	LINEAR	V	1.7 km	MPC · JPL
44668	1999 RC_{181}	—	September 9, 1999	Socorro	LINEAR	·	2.1 km	MPC · JPL
44669	1999 RC_{182}	—	September 9, 1999	Socorro	LINEAR	fast	2.1 km	MPC · JPL
44670	1999 RQ_{183}	—	September 9, 1999	Socorro	LINEAR	·	1.4 km	MPC · JPL
44671	1999 RE_{184}	—	September 9, 1999	Socorro	LINEAR	·	1.8 km	MPC · JPL
44672	1999 RL_{184}	—	September 9, 1999	Socorro	LINEAR	·	3.0 km	MPC · JPL
44673	1999 RE_{185}	—	September 9, 1999	Socorro	LINEAR	·	3.1 km	MPC · JPL
44674	1999 RD_{186}	—	September 9, 1999	Socorro	LINEAR	·	1.9 km	MPC · JPL
44675	1999 RX_{186}	—	September 9, 1999	Socorro	LINEAR	·	2.2 km	MPC · JPL
44676	1999 RG_{187}	—	September 9, 1999	Socorro	LINEAR	·	2.7 km	MPC · JPL
44677	1999 RK_{190}	—	September 10, 1999	Socorro	LINEAR	·	2.1 km	MPC · JPL
44678	1999 RP_{192}	—	September 13, 1999	Socorro	LINEAR	·	3.1 km	MPC · JPL
44679	1999 RQ_{193}	—	September 15, 1999	Kitt Peak	Spacewatch	·	4.0 km	MPC · JPL
44680	1999 RD_{194}	—	September 7, 1999	Socorro	LINEAR	·	3.3 km	MPC · JPL
44681	1999 RZ_{195}	—	September 8, 1999	Socorro	LINEAR	·	2.2 km	MPC · JPL
44682	1999 RK_{197}	—	September 8, 1999	Socorro	LINEAR	·	3.7 km	MPC · JPL
44683	1999 RR_{197}	—	September 8, 1999	Socorro	LINEAR	slow	3.7 km	MPC · JPL
44684	1999 RY_{197}	—	September 8, 1999	Socorro	LINEAR	slow	2.5 km	MPC · JPL
44685	1999 RM_{200}	—	September 8, 1999	Socorro	LINEAR	MAR	4.3 km	MPC · JPL
44686	1999 RN_{200}	—	September 8, 1999	Socorro	LINEAR	·	5.1 km	MPC · JPL
44687	1999 RS_{204}	—	September 8, 1999	Socorro	LINEAR	EUN	3.7 km	MPC · JPL
44688	1999 RR_{207}	—	September 8, 1999	Socorro	LINEAR	·	2.6 km	MPC · JPL
44689	1999 RK_{210}	—	September 8, 1999	Socorro	LINEAR	·	5.4 km	MPC · JPL
44690	1999 RK_{211}	—	September 8, 1999	Socorro	LINEAR	·	2.6 km	MPC · JPL
44691	1999 RF_{221}	—	September 5, 1999	Anderson Mesa	LONEOS	·	4.3 km	MPC · JPL
44692	1999 RG_{225}	—	September 7, 1999	Socorro	LINEAR	·	2.5 km	MPC · JPL
44693	1999 RH_{234}	—	September 8, 1999	Catalina	CSS	V	1.7 km	MPC · JPL
44694 Aprilhinton	1999 RT_{234}	Aprilhinton	September 8, 1999	Catalina	CSS	·	2.3 km	MPC · JPL
44695	1999 RY_{235}	—	September 8, 1999	Catalina	CSS	·	2.8 km	MPC · JPL
44696	1999 RZ_{235}	—	September 8, 1999	Catalina	CSS	·	2.5 km	MPC · JPL
44697	1999 RC_{239}	—	September 8, 1999	Catalina	CSS	·	2.1 km	MPC · JPL
44698	1999 RS_{247}	—	September 5, 1999	Anderson Mesa	LONEOS	V	2.0 km	MPC · JPL
44699	1999 SG	—	September 16, 1999	Višnjan Observatory	K. Korlević	·	3.7 km	MPC · JPL
44700	1999 SG_{3}	—	September 22, 1999	Socorro	LINEAR	PHO	10 km	MPC · JPL

== 44701–44800 ==
back to top

Designation			Discovery			Properties		Ref
Permanent	Provisional	Named after	Date	Site	Discoverer(s)	Category	Diam.	Ref
44701	1999 SD_{7}	—	September 29, 1999	Socorro	LINEAR	V	3.1 km	MPC · JPL
44702	1999 SJ_{7}	—	September 29, 1999	Socorro	LINEAR	·	3.4 km	MPC · JPL
44703	1999 SX_{10}	—	September 30, 1999	Catalina	CSS	V	2.0 km	MPC · JPL
44704	1999 SA_{11}	—	September 30, 1999	Catalina	CSS	·	3.5 km	MPC · JPL
44705	1999 SL_{11}	—	September 30, 1999	Catalina	CSS	·	3.1 km	MPC · JPL
44706	1999 SW_{24}	—	September 30, 1999	Catalina	CSS	·	2.6 km	MPC · JPL
44707	1999 TR_{1}	—	October 1, 1999	Višnjan Observatory	K. Korlević	V	1.8 km	MPC · JPL
44708	1999 TS_{1}	—	October 1, 1999	Višnjan Observatory	K. Korlević	·	2.2 km	MPC · JPL
44709	1999 TV_{1}	—	October 1, 1999	Višnjan Observatory	K. Korlević	NYS	3.2 km	MPC · JPL
44710	1999 TM_{3}	—	October 4, 1999	Prescott	P. G. Comba	·	2.3 km	MPC · JPL
44711 Carp	1999 TD_{4}	Carp	October 3, 1999	Kuma Kogen	A. Nakamura	·	2.4 km	MPC · JPL
44712	1999 TJ_{5}	—	October 4, 1999	Ondřejov	L. Kotková	·	2.2 km	MPC · JPL
44713	1999 TP_{5}	—	October 1, 1999	Višnjan Observatory	K. Korlević, M. Jurić	·	1.9 km	MPC · JPL
44714	1999 TS_{5}	—	October 6, 1999	High Point	D. K. Chesney	·	2.0 km	MPC · JPL
44715 Paolovezzosi	1999 TZ_{5}	Paolovezzosi	October 2, 1999	San Marcello	A. Boattini, M. Tombelli	·	2.0 km	MPC · JPL
44716	1999 TG_{6}	—	October 3, 1999	Catalina	CSS	·	3.3 km	MPC · JPL
44717 Borgoamozzano	1999 TY_{6}	Borgoamozzano	October 7, 1999	Monte Agliale	S. Donati	·	2.8 km	MPC · JPL
44718	1999 TP_{8}	—	October 7, 1999	Višnjan Observatory	K. Korlević, M. Jurić	·	3.1 km	MPC · JPL
44719	1999 TP_{9}	—	October 8, 1999	Višnjan Observatory	K. Korlević, M. Jurić	NYS	2.4 km	MPC · JPL
44720	1999 TS_{9}	—	October 8, 1999	Višnjan Observatory	K. Korlević, M. Jurić	·	2.9 km	MPC · JPL
44721	1999 TG_{10}	—	October 8, 1999	Prescott	P. G. Comba	NYS	3.1 km	MPC · JPL
44722	1999 TQ_{10}	—	October 6, 1999	Višnjan Observatory	K. Korlević, M. Jurić	·	3.8 km	MPC · JPL
44723	1999 TQ_{12}	—	October 12, 1999	Prescott	P. G. Comba	·	3.9 km	MPC · JPL
44724	1999 TU_{13}	—	October 11, 1999	Črni Vrh	Mikuž, H.	·	2.0 km	MPC · JPL
44725	1999 TD_{14}	—	October 13, 1999	Prescott	P. G. Comba	V	1.4 km	MPC · JPL
44726	1999 TT_{14}	—	October 7, 1999	Višnjan Observatory	K. Korlević, M. Jurić	NYS	2.7 km	MPC · JPL
44727	1999 TZ_{14}	—	October 12, 1999	Fountain Hills	C. W. Juels	·	2.6 km	MPC · JPL
44728	1999 TT_{15}	—	October 13, 1999	Ondřejov	P. Kušnirák, P. Pravec	·	6.2 km	MPC · JPL
44729	1999 TF_{17}	—	October 15, 1999	Višnjan Observatory	K. Korlević	·	5.4 km	MPC · JPL
44730	1999 TY_{17}	—	October 4, 1999	Xinglong	SCAP	·	3.0 km	MPC · JPL
44731	1999 TF_{18}	—	October 10, 1999	Xinglong	SCAP	·	2.1 km	MPC · JPL
44732	1999 TM_{18}	—	October 14, 1999	Xinglong	SCAP	·	4.0 km	MPC · JPL
44733	1999 TW_{19}	—	October 14, 1999	Xinglong	SCAP	NYS	3.5 km	MPC · JPL
44734	1999 TJ_{25}	—	October 3, 1999	Socorro	LINEAR	V	1.7 km	MPC · JPL
44735	1999 TJ_{27}	—	October 3, 1999	Socorro	LINEAR	·	3.6 km	MPC · JPL
44736	1999 TF_{30}	—	October 4, 1999	Socorro	LINEAR	·	4.0 km	MPC · JPL
44737	1999 TW_{32}	—	October 4, 1999	Socorro	LINEAR	GEF	2.6 km	MPC · JPL
44738	1999 TD_{35}	—	October 4, 1999	Socorro	LINEAR	PHO	2.7 km	MPC · JPL
44739	1999 TV_{36}	—	October 15, 1999	Anderson Mesa	LONEOS	·	2.1 km	MPC · JPL
44740	1999 TJ_{37}	—	October 13, 1999	Anderson Mesa	LONEOS	·	5.1 km	MPC · JPL
44741	1999 TO_{38}	—	October 1, 1999	Catalina	CSS	·	2.1 km	MPC · JPL
44742	1999 TK_{40}	—	October 5, 1999	Catalina	CSS	·	2.9 km	MPC · JPL
44743	1999 TR_{48}	—	October 4, 1999	Kitt Peak	Spacewatch	NYS	4.3 km	MPC · JPL
44744	1999 TX_{48}	—	October 4, 1999	Kitt Peak	Spacewatch	·	5.4 km	MPC · JPL
44745	1999 TZ_{54}	—	October 6, 1999	Kitt Peak	Spacewatch	V	1.2 km	MPC · JPL
44746	1999 TE_{61}	—	October 7, 1999	Kitt Peak	Spacewatch	DOR	4.9 km	MPC · JPL
44747	1999 TN_{80}	—	October 11, 1999	Kitt Peak	Spacewatch	·	3.8 km	MPC · JPL
44748	1999 TT_{86}	—	October 15, 1999	Kitt Peak	Spacewatch	·	2.8 km	MPC · JPL
44749	1999 TY_{91}	—	October 2, 1999	Socorro	LINEAR	·	2.0 km	MPC · JPL
44750	1999 TC_{94}	—	October 2, 1999	Socorro	LINEAR	·	1.9 km	MPC · JPL
44751	1999 TS_{97}	—	October 2, 1999	Socorro	LINEAR	·	6.3 km	MPC · JPL
44752	1999 TY_{99}	—	October 2, 1999	Socorro	LINEAR	·	2.3 km	MPC · JPL
44753	1999 TJ_{102}	—	October 2, 1999	Socorro	LINEAR	MAR	3.9 km	MPC · JPL
44754	1999 TJ_{105}	—	October 3, 1999	Socorro	LINEAR	·	2.3 km	MPC · JPL
44755	1999 TN_{105}	—	October 15, 1999	Socorro	LINEAR	·	1.6 km	MPC · JPL
44756	1999 TQ_{107}	—	October 4, 1999	Socorro	LINEAR	·	1.8 km	MPC · JPL
44757	1999 TF_{113}	—	October 4, 1999	Socorro	LINEAR	·	2.1 km	MPC · JPL
44758	1999 TH_{113}	—	October 4, 1999	Socorro	LINEAR	·	2.4 km	MPC · JPL
44759	1999 TY_{113}	—	October 4, 1999	Socorro	LINEAR	·	1.9 km	MPC · JPL
44760	1999 TJ_{114}	—	October 4, 1999	Socorro	LINEAR	·	2.2 km	MPC · JPL
44761	1999 TF_{115}	—	October 4, 1999	Socorro	LINEAR	V	2.0 km	MPC · JPL
44762	1999 TZ_{115}	—	October 4, 1999	Socorro	LINEAR	V	2.5 km	MPC · JPL
44763	1999 TM_{116}	—	October 4, 1999	Socorro	LINEAR	·	2.4 km	MPC · JPL
44764	1999 TG_{120}	—	October 4, 1999	Socorro	LINEAR	·	2.9 km	MPC · JPL
44765	1999 TP_{122}	—	October 4, 1999	Socorro	LINEAR	(2076)	1.8 km	MPC · JPL
44766	1999 TM_{123}	—	October 4, 1999	Socorro	LINEAR	·	6.1 km	MPC · JPL
44767	1999 TK_{124}	—	October 4, 1999	Socorro	LINEAR	·	1.8 km	MPC · JPL
44768	1999 TR_{124}	—	October 4, 1999	Socorro	LINEAR	·	3.0 km	MPC · JPL
44769	1999 TU_{130}	—	October 6, 1999	Socorro	LINEAR	·	1.3 km	MPC · JPL
44770	1999 TA_{131}	—	October 6, 1999	Socorro	LINEAR	·	2.0 km	MPC · JPL
44771	1999 TA_{135}	—	October 6, 1999	Socorro	LINEAR	·	5.7 km	MPC · JPL
44772	1999 TM_{139}	—	October 6, 1999	Socorro	LINEAR	·	2.5 km	MPC · JPL
44773	1999 TU_{140}	—	October 6, 1999	Socorro	LINEAR	SUL	3.4 km	MPC · JPL
44774	1999 TK_{141}	—	October 6, 1999	Socorro	LINEAR	·	1.6 km	MPC · JPL
44775	1999 TL_{148}	—	October 7, 1999	Socorro	LINEAR	V	1.8 km	MPC · JPL
44776	1999 TM_{149}	—	October 7, 1999	Socorro	LINEAR	·	2.6 km	MPC · JPL
44777	1999 TS_{151}	—	October 7, 1999	Socorro	LINEAR	·	4.0 km	MPC · JPL
44778	1999 TK_{152}	—	October 7, 1999	Socorro	LINEAR	·	2.3 km	MPC · JPL
44779	1999 TM_{153}	—	October 7, 1999	Socorro	LINEAR	V	1.7 km	MPC · JPL
44780	1999 TN_{154}	—	October 7, 1999	Socorro	LINEAR	·	1.7 km	MPC · JPL
44781	1999 TO_{154}	—	October 7, 1999	Socorro	LINEAR	V · slow	2.1 km	MPC · JPL
44782	1999 TK_{156}	—	October 7, 1999	Socorro	LINEAR	·	2.3 km	MPC · JPL
44783	1999 TA_{164}	—	October 9, 1999	Socorro	LINEAR	·	2.9 km	MPC · JPL
44784	1999 TQ_{165}	—	October 10, 1999	Socorro	LINEAR	·	1.8 km	MPC · JPL
44785	1999 TF_{168}	—	October 10, 1999	Socorro	LINEAR	·	1.5 km	MPC · JPL
44786	1999 TQ_{171}	—	October 10, 1999	Socorro	LINEAR	·	4.6 km	MPC · JPL
44787	1999 TE_{172}	—	October 10, 1999	Socorro	LINEAR	·	3.2 km	MPC · JPL
44788	1999 TS_{172}	—	October 10, 1999	Socorro	LINEAR	·	2.5 km	MPC · JPL
44789	1999 TU_{172}	—	October 10, 1999	Socorro	LINEAR	·	2.4 km	MPC · JPL
44790	1999 TV_{173}	—	October 10, 1999	Socorro	LINEAR	ADE	6.5 km	MPC · JPL
44791	1999 TN_{176}	—	October 10, 1999	Socorro	LINEAR	NYS	1.5 km	MPC · JPL
44792	1999 TK_{177}	—	October 10, 1999	Socorro	LINEAR	·	2.8 km	MPC · JPL
44793	1999 TB_{178}	—	October 10, 1999	Socorro	LINEAR	·	2.1 km	MPC · JPL
44794	1999 TP_{180}	—	October 10, 1999	Socorro	LINEAR	·	2.0 km	MPC · JPL
44795	1999 TU_{180}	—	October 10, 1999	Socorro	LINEAR	NYS	2.0 km	MPC · JPL
44796	1999 TY_{180}	—	October 10, 1999	Socorro	LINEAR	·	3.1 km	MPC · JPL
44797	1999 TD_{181}	—	October 10, 1999	Socorro	LINEAR	NYS	3.3 km	MPC · JPL
44798	1999 TL_{191}	—	October 12, 1999	Socorro	LINEAR	·	3.2 km	MPC · JPL
44799	1999 TQ_{192}	—	October 12, 1999	Socorro	LINEAR	V	1.8 km	MPC · JPL
44800	1999 TY_{194}	—	October 12, 1999	Socorro	LINEAR	·	3.1 km	MPC · JPL

== 44801–44900 ==
back to top

Designation			Discovery			Properties		Ref
Permanent	Provisional	Named after	Date	Site	Discoverer(s)	Category	Diam.	Ref
44801	1999 TD_{200}	—	October 12, 1999	Socorro	LINEAR	·	1.8 km	MPC · JPL
44802	1999 TG_{206}	—	October 13, 1999	Socorro	LINEAR	·	2.2 km	MPC · JPL
44803	1999 TO_{206}	—	October 13, 1999	Socorro	LINEAR	·	2.0 km	MPC · JPL
44804	1999 TO_{210}	—	October 14, 1999	Socorro	LINEAR	ADE	9.4 km	MPC · JPL
44805	1999 TT_{214}	—	October 15, 1999	Socorro	LINEAR	V	1.3 km	MPC · JPL
44806	1999 TW_{215}	—	October 15, 1999	Socorro	LINEAR	NYS	3.6 km	MPC · JPL
44807	1999 TP_{217}	—	October 15, 1999	Socorro	LINEAR	·	2.2 km	MPC · JPL
44808	1999 TM_{220}	—	October 1, 1999	Catalina	CSS	·	1.9 km	MPC · JPL
44809	1999 TN_{221}	—	October 2, 1999	Socorro	LINEAR	·	2.3 km	MPC · JPL
44810	1999 TR_{221}	—	October 2, 1999	Anderson Mesa	LONEOS	·	3.7 km	MPC · JPL
44811	1999 TE_{222}	—	October 2, 1999	Anderson Mesa	LONEOS	·	2.8 km	MPC · JPL
44812	1999 TH_{222}	—	October 2, 1999	Anderson Mesa	LONEOS	·	2.2 km	MPC · JPL
44813	1999 TV_{222}	—	October 2, 1999	Socorro	LINEAR	·	2.5 km	MPC · JPL
44814	1999 TX_{222}	—	October 2, 1999	Socorro	LINEAR	·	2.0 km	MPC · JPL
44815	1999 TO_{223}	—	October 2, 1999	Socorro	LINEAR	·	2.2 km	MPC · JPL
44816	1999 TB_{224}	—	October 4, 1999	Anderson Mesa	LONEOS	·	3.0 km	MPC · JPL
44817	1999 TW_{234}	—	October 3, 1999	Catalina	CSS	·	2.0 km	MPC · JPL
44818	1999 TQ_{236}	—	October 3, 1999	Catalina	CSS	·	1.7 km	MPC · JPL
44819	1999 TS_{236}	—	October 3, 1999	Catalina	CSS	·	2.3 km	MPC · JPL
44820	1999 TX_{236}	—	October 3, 1999	Catalina	CSS	·	5.5 km	MPC · JPL
44821 Amadora	1999 TZ_{236}	Amadora	October 3, 1999	Catalina	CSS	PHO	4.9 km	MPC · JPL
44822	1999 TW_{239}	—	October 4, 1999	Catalina	CSS	V	2.6 km	MPC · JPL
44823	1999 TG_{242}	—	October 4, 1999	Catalina	CSS	·	3.1 km	MPC · JPL
44824	1999 TH_{243}	—	October 6, 1999	Socorro	LINEAR	·	5.7 km	MPC · JPL
44825	1999 TS_{243}	—	October 12, 1999	Socorro	LINEAR	PHO	3.2 km	MPC · JPL
44826	1999 TH_{244}	—	October 7, 1999	Catalina	CSS	·	2.6 km	MPC · JPL
44827	1999 TN_{247}	—	October 8, 1999	Catalina	CSS	·	4.2 km	MPC · JPL
44828	1999 TR_{247}	—	October 8, 1999	Catalina	CSS	·	2.4 km	MPC · JPL
44829	1999 TS_{247}	—	October 8, 1999	Catalina	CSS	·	2.1 km	MPC · JPL
44830	1999 TT_{247}	—	October 8, 1999	Catalina	CSS	·	2.1 km	MPC · JPL
44831	1999 TF_{248}	—	October 8, 1999	Catalina	CSS	V	1.4 km	MPC · JPL
44832	1999 TJ_{248}	—	October 8, 1999	Catalina	CSS	NYS	2.2 km	MPC · JPL
44833	1999 TL_{248}	—	October 8, 1999	Catalina	CSS	·	6.2 km	MPC · JPL
44834	1999 TE_{256}	—	October 9, 1999	Socorro	LINEAR	·	1.6 km	MPC · JPL
44835	1999 TS_{259}	—	October 9, 1999	Socorro	LINEAR	MAS	1.9 km	MPC · JPL
44836	1999 TB_{262}	—	October 13, 1999	Socorro	LINEAR	·	2.4 km	MPC · JPL
44837	1999 TM_{270}	—	October 3, 1999	Socorro	LINEAR	·	3.5 km	MPC · JPL
44838	1999 TK_{272}	—	October 3, 1999	Socorro	LINEAR	·	2.6 km	MPC · JPL
44839	1999 TU_{273}	—	October 5, 1999	Socorro	LINEAR	·	8.4 km	MPC · JPL
44840	1999 TO_{284}	—	October 9, 1999	Socorro	LINEAR	·	2.2 km	MPC · JPL
44841	1999 TP_{284}	—	October 9, 1999	Socorro	LINEAR	·	1.9 km	MPC · JPL
44842	1999 TG_{285}	—	October 9, 1999	Socorro	LINEAR	·	2.1 km	MPC · JPL
44843	1999 TX_{286}	—	October 10, 1999	Socorro	LINEAR	·	2.1 km	MPC · JPL
44844	1999 TG_{288}	—	October 10, 1999	Socorro	LINEAR	·	2.5 km	MPC · JPL
44845	1999 TE_{289}	—	October 10, 1999	Socorro	LINEAR	WIT	2.0 km	MPC · JPL
44846	1999 TN_{290}	—	October 10, 1999	Socorro	LINEAR	EUN	3.7 km	MPC · JPL
44847	1999 TA_{291}	—	October 10, 1999	Socorro	LINEAR	·	3.3 km	MPC · JPL
44848	1999 TY_{291}	—	October 10, 1999	Socorro	LINEAR	EUN	3.9 km	MPC · JPL
44849	1999 UE_{1}	—	October 16, 1999	Višnjan Observatory	K. Korlević	·	2.3 km	MPC · JPL
44850	1999 UR_{1}	—	October 17, 1999	Oohira	T. Urata	·	1.9 km	MPC · JPL
44851	1999 UE_{2}	—	October 16, 1999	Višnjan Observatory	K. Korlević	·	2.5 km	MPC · JPL
44852	1999 UG_{2}	—	October 17, 1999	Višnjan Observatory	K. Korlević	NYS	3.7 km	MPC · JPL
44853	1999 UR_{4}	—	October 31, 1999	Ondřejov	L. Kotková	·	2.9 km	MPC · JPL
44854	1999 UY_{5}	—	October 29, 1999	Catalina	CSS	V	3.7 km	MPC · JPL
44855	1999 UF_{6}	—	October 28, 1999	Xinglong	SCAP	·	1.5 km	MPC · JPL
44856	1999 UH_{6}	—	October 28, 1999	Xinglong	SCAP	·	3.9 km	MPC · JPL
44857	1999 UW_{8}	—	October 29, 1999	Catalina	CSS	·	3.1 km	MPC · JPL
44858	1999 UZ_{13}	—	October 29, 1999	Catalina	CSS	fast?	1.5 km	MPC · JPL
44859	1999 UH_{14}	—	October 29, 1999	Catalina	CSS	·	2.5 km	MPC · JPL
44860	1999 UC_{15}	—	October 29, 1999	Catalina	CSS	·	2.7 km	MPC · JPL
44861	1999 UL_{15}	—	October 29, 1999	Catalina	CSS	·	3.5 km	MPC · JPL
44862	1999 UM_{15}	—	October 29, 1999	Catalina	CSS	·	3.2 km	MPC · JPL
44863	1999 UV_{15}	—	October 29, 1999	Catalina	CSS	·	2.8 km	MPC · JPL
44864	1999 UJ_{23}	—	October 28, 1999	Catalina	CSS	·	1.9 km	MPC · JPL
44865	1999 UO_{23}	—	October 28, 1999	Catalina	CSS	EUN	2.8 km	MPC · JPL
44866	1999 UP_{27}	—	October 30, 1999	Kitt Peak	Spacewatch	NYS	3.0 km	MPC · JPL
44867	1999 UN_{29}	—	October 31, 1999	Kitt Peak	Spacewatch	NYS	3.3 km	MPC · JPL
44868	1999 UQ_{29}	—	October 31, 1999	Kitt Peak	Spacewatch	·	2.0 km	MPC · JPL
44869	1999 UQ_{34}	—	October 31, 1999	Kitt Peak	Spacewatch	·	2.7 km	MPC · JPL
44870	1999 UP_{35}	—	October 30, 1999	Kitt Peak	Spacewatch	V	2.0 km	MPC · JPL
44871	1999 UR_{38}	—	October 29, 1999	Anderson Mesa	LONEOS	·	4.5 km	MPC · JPL
44872	1999 UA_{41}	—	October 17, 1999	Anderson Mesa	LONEOS	V	2.0 km	MPC · JPL
44873	1999 UF_{41}	—	October 17, 1999	Anderson Mesa	LONEOS	·	1.8 km	MPC · JPL
44874	1999 UY_{44}	—	October 30, 1999	Catalina	CSS	PAD	5.4 km	MPC · JPL
44875	1999 UO_{45}	—	October 31, 1999	Catalina	CSS	V	2.0 km	MPC · JPL
44876	1999 UG_{46}	—	October 31, 1999	Catalina	CSS	V	1.4 km	MPC · JPL
44877	1999 UK_{46}	—	October 31, 1999	Catalina	CSS	V	1.7 km	MPC · JPL
44878	1999 UD_{49}	—	October 31, 1999	Catalina	CSS	V	2.4 km	MPC · JPL
44879	1999 UP_{50}	—	October 30, 1999	Catalina	CSS	·	3.2 km	MPC · JPL
44880	1999 UF_{51}	—	October 31, 1999	Catalina	CSS	·	3.0 km	MPC · JPL
44881	1999 UJ_{51}	—	October 31, 1999	Catalina	CSS	V	1.5 km	MPC · JPL
44882	1999 UR_{51}	—	October 31, 1999	Catalina	CSS	·	2.1 km	MPC · JPL
44883	1999 UW_{52}	—	October 31, 1999	Catalina	CSS	·	4.3 km	MPC · JPL
44884	1999 UT_{56}	—	October 28, 1999	Catalina	CSS	·	2.2 km	MPC · JPL
44885 Vodička	1999 VB	Vodička	November 1, 1999	Kleť	J. Tichá, M. Tichý	·	2.6 km	MPC · JPL
44886	1999 VF_{1}	—	November 4, 1999	Zeno	T. Stafford	·	5.0 km	MPC · JPL
44887	1999 VF_{5}	—	November 5, 1999	Višnjan Observatory	K. Korlević	(5)	2.9 km	MPC · JPL
44888	1999 VJ_{5}	—	November 4, 1999	Nachi-Katsuura	Y. Shimizu, T. Urata	·	2.5 km	MPC · JPL
44889	1999 VC_{6}	—	November 5, 1999	Oizumi	T. Kobayashi	·	3.0 km	MPC · JPL
44890	1999 VF_{7}	—	November 7, 1999	Višnjan Observatory	K. Korlević	·	3.9 km	MPC · JPL
44891	1999 VB_{8}	—	November 8, 1999	Višnjan Observatory	K. Korlević	NYS	2.8 km	MPC · JPL
44892	1999 VJ_{8}	—	November 8, 1999	Višnjan Observatory	K. Korlević	EUN	6.7 km	MPC · JPL
44893	1999 VV_{8}	—	November 5, 1999	Farpoint	Farpoint	·	1.8 km	MPC · JPL
44894	1999 VK_{9}	—	November 8, 1999	Višnjan Observatory	K. Korlević	·	2.5 km	MPC · JPL
44895	1999 VL_{9}	—	November 8, 1999	Višnjan Observatory	K. Korlević	·	7.1 km	MPC · JPL
44896	1999 VB_{12}	—	November 10, 1999	Fountain Hills	C. W. Juels	·	5.5 km	MPC · JPL
44897	1999 VP_{12}	—	November 11, 1999	Fountain Hills	C. W. Juels	·	3.6 km	MPC · JPL
44898	1999 VA_{15}	—	November 2, 1999	Kitt Peak	Spacewatch	·	2.0 km	MPC · JPL
44899	1999 VD_{15}	—	November 2, 1999	Kitt Peak	Spacewatch	·	3.4 km	MPC · JPL
44900	1999 VG_{17}	—	November 2, 1999	Kitt Peak	Spacewatch	·	2.9 km	MPC · JPL

== 44901–45000 ==
back to top

Designation			Discovery			Properties		Ref
Permanent	Provisional	Named after	Date	Site	Discoverer(s)	Category	Diam.	Ref
44901	1999 VS_{18}	—	November 2, 1999	Kitt Peak	Spacewatch	NYS	1.6 km	MPC · JPL
44902	1999 VJ_{19}	—	November 10, 1999	Višnjan Observatory	K. Korlević	·	2.0 km	MPC · JPL
44903	1999 VR_{19}	—	November 12, 1999	Zeno	T. Stafford	·	4.6 km	MPC · JPL
44904	1999 VH_{21}	—	November 12, 1999	Višnjan Observatory	K. Korlević	ADE	7.9 km	MPC · JPL
44905	1999 VS_{22}	—	November 13, 1999	Fountain Hills	C. W. Juels	BAP	3.2 km	MPC · JPL
44906	1999 VF_{23}	—	November 8, 1999	Majorca	R. Pacheco, Á. López J.	·	2.6 km	MPC · JPL
44907	1999 VM_{24}	—	November 15, 1999	Fountain Hills	C. W. Juels	PHO	6.6 km	MPC · JPL
44908	1999 VR_{24}	—	November 15, 1999	Ondřejov	P. Kušnirák	·	2.3 km	MPC · JPL
44909	1999 VV_{24}	—	November 13, 1999	Oizumi	T. Kobayashi	·	3.1 km	MPC · JPL
44910	1999 VX_{24}	—	November 13, 1999	Oizumi	T. Kobayashi	·	2.7 km	MPC · JPL
44911	1999 VJ_{25}	—	November 13, 1999	Oizumi	T. Kobayashi	·	3.2 km	MPC · JPL
44912	1999 VN_{25}	—	November 13, 1999	Oizumi	T. Kobayashi	·	3.2 km	MPC · JPL
44913	1999 VD_{26}	—	November 3, 1999	Socorro	LINEAR	·	3.9 km	MPC · JPL
44914	1999 VN_{27}	—	November 3, 1999	Catalina	CSS	·	2.1 km	MPC · JPL
44915	1999 VR_{27}	—	November 3, 1999	Catalina	CSS	·	2.8 km	MPC · JPL
44916	1999 VL_{28}	—	November 3, 1999	Socorro	LINEAR	·	1.3 km	MPC · JPL
44917	1999 VY_{29}	—	November 3, 1999	Socorro	LINEAR	V	1.4 km	MPC · JPL
44918	1999 VV_{30}	—	November 3, 1999	Socorro	LINEAR	·	5.9 km	MPC · JPL
44919	1999 VC_{31}	—	November 3, 1999	Socorro	LINEAR	·	4.6 km	MPC · JPL
44920	1999 VK_{32}	—	November 3, 1999	Socorro	LINEAR	MAS	1.7 km	MPC · JPL
44921	1999 VL_{32}	—	November 3, 1999	Socorro	LINEAR	AGN	3.3 km	MPC · JPL
44922	1999 VE_{34}	—	November 3, 1999	Socorro	LINEAR	·	2.7 km	MPC · JPL
44923	1999 VF_{34}	—	November 3, 1999	Socorro	LINEAR	·	7.8 km	MPC · JPL
44924	1999 VN_{34}	—	November 3, 1999	Socorro	LINEAR	·	4.3 km	MPC · JPL
44925	1999 VB_{36}	—	November 3, 1999	Socorro	LINEAR	·	3.4 km	MPC · JPL
44926	1999 VC_{36}	—	November 3, 1999	Socorro	LINEAR	·	2.7 km	MPC · JPL
44927	1999 VX_{36}	—	November 3, 1999	Socorro	LINEAR	·	2.6 km	MPC · JPL
44928	1999 VJ_{37}	—	November 3, 1999	Socorro	LINEAR	·	2.6 km	MPC · JPL
44929	1999 VR_{37}	—	November 3, 1999	Socorro	LINEAR	WAT	5.5 km	MPC · JPL
44930	1999 VC_{39}	—	November 10, 1999	Socorro	LINEAR	·	3.1 km	MPC · JPL
44931	1999 VD_{39}	—	November 10, 1999	Socorro	LINEAR	·	2.6 km	MPC · JPL
44932	1999 VJ_{40}	—	November 5, 1999	Uenohara	N. Kawasato	·	3.1 km	MPC · JPL
44933 Therezallewelyn	1999 VU_{44}	Therezallewelyn	November 4, 1999	Catalina	CSS	·	3.4 km	MPC · JPL
44934	1999 VV_{45}	—	November 4, 1999	Catalina	CSS	·	1.9 km	MPC · JPL
44935	1999 VT_{49}	—	November 3, 1999	Socorro	LINEAR	·	2.6 km	MPC · JPL
44936	1999 VD_{50}	—	November 3, 1999	Socorro	LINEAR	·	2.4 km	MPC · JPL
44937	1999 VU_{50}	—	November 3, 1999	Socorro	LINEAR	·	4.3 km	MPC · JPL
44938	1999 VV_{50}	—	November 3, 1999	Socorro	LINEAR	·	2.5 km	MPC · JPL
44939	1999 VB_{52}	—	November 3, 1999	Socorro	LINEAR	·	3.6 km	MPC · JPL
44940	1999 VH_{53}	—	November 3, 1999	Socorro	LINEAR	V	3.8 km	MPC · JPL
44941	1999 VQ_{53}	—	November 4, 1999	Socorro	LINEAR	MAS	2.0 km	MPC · JPL
44942	1999 VM_{55}	—	November 4, 1999	Socorro	LINEAR	ERI	5.0 km	MPC · JPL
44943	1999 VB_{57}	—	November 4, 1999	Socorro	LINEAR	·	3.4 km	MPC · JPL
44944	1999 VS_{58}	—	November 4, 1999	Socorro	LINEAR	·	3.9 km	MPC · JPL
44945	1999 VG_{59}	—	November 4, 1999	Socorro	LINEAR	·	3.2 km	MPC · JPL
44946	1999 VU_{61}	—	November 4, 1999	Socorro	LINEAR	·	2.9 km	MPC · JPL
44947	1999 VK_{62}	—	November 4, 1999	Socorro	LINEAR	·	7.8 km	MPC · JPL
44948	1999 VT_{63}	—	November 4, 1999	Socorro	LINEAR	·	2.5 km	MPC · JPL
44949	1999 VX_{63}	—	November 4, 1999	Socorro	LINEAR	RAF	3.1 km	MPC · JPL
44950	1999 VY_{65}	—	November 4, 1999	Socorro	LINEAR	slow	3.0 km	MPC · JPL
44951	1999 VD_{68}	—	November 4, 1999	Socorro	LINEAR	EUN	4.9 km	MPC · JPL
44952	1999 VB_{71}	—	November 4, 1999	Socorro	LINEAR	NYS	2.2 km	MPC · JPL
44953	1999 VB_{72}	—	November 11, 1999	Xinglong	SCAP	·	2.8 km	MPC · JPL
44954	1999 VN_{72}	—	November 15, 1999	Xinglong	SCAP	V	2.1 km	MPC · JPL
44955	1999 VS_{72}	—	November 5, 1999	Uenohara	N. Kawasato	·	6.3 km	MPC · JPL
44956	1999 VQ_{77}	—	November 3, 1999	Socorro	LINEAR	·	1.8 km	MPC · JPL
44957	1999 VG_{78}	—	November 4, 1999	Socorro	LINEAR	·	2.9 km	MPC · JPL
44958	1999 VT_{78}	—	November 4, 1999	Socorro	LINEAR	·	3.0 km	MPC · JPL
44959	1999 VL_{82}	—	November 5, 1999	Socorro	LINEAR	fast	1.5 km	MPC · JPL
44960	1999 VJ_{86}	—	November 5, 1999	Socorro	LINEAR	V	2.3 km	MPC · JPL
44961	1999 VS_{86}	—	November 7, 1999	Socorro	LINEAR	·	3.0 km	MPC · JPL
44962	1999 VL_{87}	—	November 4, 1999	Socorro	LINEAR	·	2.4 km	MPC · JPL
44963	1999 VZ_{88}	—	November 4, 1999	Socorro	LINEAR	·	1.3 km	MPC · JPL
44964	1999 VK_{90}	—	November 5, 1999	Socorro	LINEAR	V	1.9 km	MPC · JPL
44965	1999 VY_{92}	—	November 9, 1999	Socorro	LINEAR	·	2.1 km	MPC · JPL
44966	1999 VD_{93}	—	November 9, 1999	Socorro	LINEAR	·	4.3 km	MPC · JPL
44967	1999 VG_{93}	—	November 9, 1999	Socorro	LINEAR	NYS	4.5 km	MPC · JPL
44968	1999 VC_{97}	—	November 9, 1999	Socorro	LINEAR	·	2.2 km	MPC · JPL
44969	1999 VD_{97}	—	November 9, 1999	Socorro	LINEAR	·	1.8 km	MPC · JPL
44970	1999 VJ_{98}	—	November 9, 1999	Socorro	LINEAR	·	3.2 km	MPC · JPL
44971	1999 VA_{100}	—	November 9, 1999	Socorro	LINEAR	NYS	2.1 km	MPC · JPL
44972	1999 VB_{112}	—	November 9, 1999	Socorro	LINEAR	·	3.6 km	MPC · JPL
44973	1999 VV_{112}	—	November 9, 1999	Socorro	LINEAR	MAS	1.4 km	MPC · JPL
44974	1999 VT_{114}	—	November 9, 1999	Catalina	CSS	·	4.1 km	MPC · JPL
44975	1999 VD_{145}	—	November 13, 1999	Catalina	CSS	·	3.8 km	MPC · JPL
44976	1999 VJ_{146}	—	November 12, 1999	Socorro	LINEAR	·	2.8 km	MPC · JPL
44977	1999 VN_{156}	—	November 12, 1999	Socorro	LINEAR	slow	6.7 km	MPC · JPL
44978	1999 VN_{157}	—	November 14, 1999	Socorro	LINEAR	·	2.8 km	MPC · JPL
44979	1999 VT_{157}	—	November 14, 1999	Socorro	LINEAR	·	1.8 km	MPC · JPL
44980	1999 VW_{157}	—	November 14, 1999	Socorro	LINEAR	NYS	1.7 km	MPC · JPL
44981	1999 VG_{159}	—	November 14, 1999	Socorro	LINEAR	·	2.0 km	MPC · JPL
44982	1999 VD_{160}	—	November 14, 1999	Socorro	LINEAR	NYS	3.3 km	MPC · JPL
44983	1999 VU_{163}	—	November 14, 1999	Socorro	LINEAR	·	2.8 km	MPC · JPL
44984	1999 VC_{164}	—	November 14, 1999	Socorro	LINEAR	·	4.4 km	MPC · JPL
44985	1999 VD_{164}	—	November 14, 1999	Socorro	LINEAR	AGN	3.1 km	MPC · JPL
44986	1999 VT_{164}	—	November 14, 1999	Socorro	LINEAR	V	1.5 km	MPC · JPL
44987	1999 VW_{168}	—	November 14, 1999	Socorro	LINEAR	·	2.8 km	MPC · JPL
44988	1999 VR_{172}	—	November 14, 1999	Socorro	LINEAR	·	2.9 km	MPC · JPL
44989	1999 VG_{173}	—	November 15, 1999	Socorro	LINEAR	MAS	1.6 km	MPC · JPL
44990	1999 VD_{174}	—	November 3, 1999	Anderson Mesa	LONEOS	·	5.8 km	MPC · JPL
44991	1999 VJ_{174}	—	November 12, 1999	Anderson Mesa	LONEOS	V	2.7 km	MPC · JPL
44992	1999 VK_{178}	—	November 6, 1999	Socorro	LINEAR	·	2.5 km	MPC · JPL
44993	1999 VP_{178}	—	November 6, 1999	Socorro	LINEAR	·	1.4 km	MPC · JPL
44994	1999 VM_{179}	—	November 6, 1999	Socorro	LINEAR	·	3.1 km	MPC · JPL
44995	1999 VS_{184}	—	November 15, 1999	Socorro	LINEAR	·	1.8 km	MPC · JPL
44996	1999 VT_{184}	—	November 15, 1999	Socorro	LINEAR	·	2.2 km	MPC · JPL
44997	1999 VX_{184}	—	November 15, 1999	Socorro	LINEAR	·	3.8 km	MPC · JPL
44998	1999 VH_{185}	—	November 15, 1999	Socorro	LINEAR	·	3.3 km	MPC · JPL
44999	1999 VQ_{186}	—	November 15, 1999	Socorro	LINEAR	(12739)	4.2 km	MPC · JPL
45000	1999 VR_{186}	—	November 15, 1999	Socorro	LINEAR	·	3.1 km	MPC · JPL

back to top

== See also ==
- Meanings of minor-planet names: 44001–45000
