= Meanings of minor-planet names: 44001–45000 =

As minor planet discoveries are confirmed, they are given a permanent number by the IAU's Minor Planet Center (MPC), and the discoverers can then submit names for them, following the IAU's naming conventions. The list below concerns those minor planets in the specified number-range that have received names, and explains the meanings of those names.

Official naming citations of newly named small Solar System bodies are approved and published in a bulletin by IAU's Working Group for Small Bodies Nomenclature (WGSBN). Before May 2021, citations were published in MPC's Minor Planet Circulars for many decades. Recent citations can also be found on the JPL Small-Body Database (SBDB). Until his death in 2016, German astronomer Lutz D. Schmadel compiled these citations into the Dictionary of Minor Planet Names (DMP) and regularly updated the collection.

Based on Paul Herget's The Names of the Minor Planets, Schmadel also researched the unclear origin of numerous asteroids, most of which had been named prior to World War II. This article incorporates text from this source, which is in the public domain: SBDB New namings may only be added to this list below after official publication as the preannouncement of names is condemned. The WGSBN publishes a comprehensive guideline for the naming rules of non-cometary small Solar System bodies.

== 44001–44100 ==
Named minor planet	Provisional	This minor planet was named for...	Ref · Catalog
44001 Jonquet	1997 RE_{3}	Pierre Jonquet, French astronomer, a founding member of the Astronomical Society at Montpellier, southern France	JPL · 44001
44005 Migliardi	1997 SY_{3}	Marco Migliardi (born 1957), Italian teacher of Italian language and literature, amateur astronomer and friend of Vittorio Goretti who discovered this minor planet	JPL · 44005
44011 Juubichi	1997 UH_{15}	Mount Juubichi (482 m), east of Nanyo city, Yamagata prefecture, Japan	JPL · 44011
44013 Iidetenmondai	1997 VB_{7}	Iide Tenmondai (Iide Astronomical observatory) is located in the southern part of Yamagata prefecture, Japan.	JPL · 44013
44016 Jimmypage	1997 WQ_{28}	Jimmy Page (born 1944), OBE, British composer, producer and master guitarist, leader of the Yardbirds and Led Zeppelin	JPL · 44016
44027 Termain	1998 AD	Patricia Ann Termain Eliason (born 1952), American support scientist for Viking, Voyager and other spacecraft missions, project manager for the GONG heliosiesmic program	JPL · 44027
44033 Michez	1998 CB_{4}	Giacomo Michez (1839–1873), an Italian astronomer.	JPL · 44033
44039 de Sahagún	1998 DS_{33}	Bernardino de Sahagún (1499–1590), a Franciscan missionary who after arriving in Mexico in 1529 researched the indigenous cultures of the country.	JPL · 44039
44041 Françoiselaunay	1998 ER_{1}	Françoise Launay (b. 1944), a research engineer at Meudon Observatory.	IAU · 44041

== 44101–44200 ==
back to top

Named minor planet	Provisional	This minor planet was named for...	Ref · Catalog
44103 Aldana	1998 GE_{1}	Fernando Aldana Mayor (born 1944), Spanish astrophysicist, promoter of the 10-m Gran Telescopio Canarias	JPL · 44103
44110 Cassegrain	1998 HT_{5}	Laurent Cassegrain (c. 1629–1693), a French priest and teacher.	IAU · 44110
44117 Haroldlarson	1998 HL_{27}	Harold P. Larson (born 1938), American pioneer of airborne infrared astronomy and educator at the University of Arizona	JPL · 44117
44167 Patriciaquinn	1998 JA_{3}	Patricia Quinn (born 1956), American water project engineer who joined the Lowell Observatory Advisory Board in 2022	IAU · 44167
44192 Paulguttman	1998 ME_{2}	Paul Guttman (1940–2013), a radiologist and entrepreneur	JPL · 44192
44194 Urmuz	1998 MQ_{7}	Urmuz (1883-1923), Romanian absurdist writer whose work was influential for the development of Dadaism and Surrealism	IAU · 44194
44195 Michaelcordova	1998 MW_{7}	Michael Cordova (born 1956), American airline pilot and astronomy enthusiast. Cordova joined the Lowell Observatory Advisory Board in 2022.	IAU · 44195

== 44201–44300 ==
back to top

Named minor planet	Provisional	This minor planet was named for...	Ref · Catalog
44206 Clareschneider	1998 OM	Clare Schneider (b. 1962), an American technical writer.	IAU · 44206
44216 Olivercabasa	1998 PH	Josep Maria Oliver i Cabasa (born 1944), Spanish amateur astronomer, co-founder of the amateur astronomical society Spanish: Agrupació Astronómica de Sabadell, also see 13260 Sabadell	JPL · 44216
44217 Whittle	1998 PO_{1}	Frank Whittle (1907–1996), British aeronautical engineer and pilot, inventor of the turbo-jet engine	JPL · 44217
44263 Nansouty	1998 QR_{53}	Charles-Marie-Étienne Champion Dubois de Nansouty (1815–1895), French general and meteorologist (fr-wiki)	JPL · 44263

== 44301–44400 ==
back to top

Named minor planet	Provisional	This minor planet was named for...	Ref · Catalog
44360 Ferlet	1998 SK_{10}	Roger Ferlet (b. 1948), a French astrophysicist.	IAU · 44360
44368 Andreafrigo	1998 SR_{26}	Andrea Frigo (born 1982), an Italian friar and material scientist at the National Institute for Nuclear Physics (INFN) in Padua, who has been instrumental in refurbishing the planetarium of Amelia with astronomical instruments at the Santissima Annunziata convent in Umbria, Italy (Src).	IAU · 44368

== 44401–44500 ==
back to top

Named minor planet	Provisional	This minor planet was named for...	Ref · Catalog
44455 Artdula	1998 VK	Arthur M. Dula (born 1947), a patent attorney, space lawyer and co-founder of several space technology companies.	JPL · 44455
44456 Vidal-Madjar	1998 VP_{4}	Alfred Vidal-Madjar (b. 1942), a French observational astrophysicist.	IAU · 44456
44473 Randytatum	1998 WB	Randy Tatum (born 1956) is an avid observer with the Association of Lunar and Planetary Observers (ALPO) and has served as Assistant Coordinator for the Jupiter and Solar Sections of the ALPO as well as full Solar Coordinator from 1993 to 1996. He is the 2016 recipient of the ALPO Haas Award for his prolific and expert observing.	JPL · 44473
44475 Hikarumasai	1998 WF	Hikaru Masai (born 1987) is a Japanese vocalist and original member of the musical group "Kalafina".	JPL · 44475
44479 Oláheszter	1998 WS_{8}	Eszter Kiss (née Oláh, 1945–2004), mother of astronomer László L. Kiss, who co-discovered this minor planet	JPL · 44479
44487 Miyaharaterumasa	1998 WC_{20}	Terumasa Miyahara, Japanese amateur astronomer and director of the Korino Observatory in Minamisatsuma City, Kagoshima Prefecture.	IAU · 44487

== 44501–44600 ==
back to top

Named minor planet	Provisional	This minor planet was named for...	Ref · Catalog
44527 Tonnon	1998 YC_{6}	Anthonie Tonnon (born 1989) is a New Zealand musician.	IAU · 44527
44530 Horáková	1998 YC_{8}	Milada Horáková (1901–1950), Czech lawyer and politician	JPL · 44530
44570 Yuribeletsky	1999 FX_{5}	Yuri Beletsky (b. 1976), a Belarusian professional astronomer and astrophotographer living in Chile.	IAU · 44570
44574 Lavoratti	1999 GF_{1}	Piero Lavoratti (born 1935), Italian amateur astronomer	JPL · 44574
44597 Thoreau	1999 PW	Henry David Thoreau (1817–1862), American essayist and naturalist	MPC · 44597

== 44601–44700 ==
back to top

Named minor planet	Provisional	This minor planet was named for...	Ref · Catalog
44613 Rudolf	1999 RU_{31}	Rudolf II von Habsburg (1552–1612), Bohemian king and Holy Roman Emperor, who employed Tycho Brahe and Johannes Kepler as his court astronomers in Prague	JPL · 44613
44694 Aprilhinton	1999 RT_{234}	April Jewell Hinton (b. 1977), an American dentist.	JPL · 44694

== 44701–44800 ==
back to top

Named minor planet	Provisional	This minor planet was named for...	Ref · Catalog
44711 Carp	1999 TD_{4}	The Hiroshima Toyo Carp, Japanese baseball team	JPL · 44711
44715 Paolovezzosi	1999 TZ_{5}	Paolo Vezzosi (b. 1959), an Italian amateur astronomer.	IAU · 44715
44717 Borgoamozzano	1999 TY_{6}	Borgo a Mozzano is an ancient Italian town in the province of Lucca, in Tuscany. On a wooded hill nearby is the Monte Agliale Astronomical Observatory, at which numerous asteroids and supernovae have been discovered.	JPL · 44717

== 44801–44900 ==
back to top

Named minor planet	Provisional	This minor planet was named for...	Ref · Catalog
44821 Amadora	1999 TZ_{236}	Amadora Gonzalez, Spanish wife of David Martínez-Delgado, who first observed this minor planet in September 1998 at the Las Campanas Observatory (more than a year before the actual discovery by the Catalina Sky Survey)	JPL · 44821
44885 Vodička	1999 VB	Karel Vodička (1880–1957) was a mathematician and physicist with a deep interest in astronomy, director of Jirsík High School (1925–1935). He founded the South Bohemian Astronomical Society (JAS) in 1928 and served as the first director of České Budějovice Observatory (1928–1942) built by JAS.	JPL · 44885

== 44901–45000 ==
back to top

Named minor planet	Provisional	This minor planet was named for...	Ref · Catalog
44933 Therezallewelyn	1999 VU_{44}	Thereza Dillwyn Llewelyn, Welsh astronomer and female photographers.	IAU · 44933

back to top

Preceded by 43,001–44,000	Meanings of minor-planet names List of minor planets: 44,001–45,000	Succeeded by 45,001–46,000
