= Tom Stafford (astronomer) =

American astronomer

Asteroids discovered: 40
12061 Alena	March 21, 1998
12533 Edmond	June 2, 1998
(13324) 1998 SK2	September 18, 1998
13436 Enid	November 17, 1999
13688 Oklahoma	September 9, 1997
(14165) 1998 UZ	October 19, 1998
(15162) 2000 GN2	April 5, 2000
15904 Halstead	September 29, 1997
(16820) 1997 VA3	November 6, 1997
(18033) 1999 NR4	July 14, 1999
(19632) 1999 RP39	September 13, 1999
(22825) 1999 RO39	September 13, 1999
(23201) 2000 SJ42	September 27, 2000
(24095) 1999 VN	November 2, 1999
(24107) 1999 VS19	November 12, 1999
(25357) 1999 TM	October 1, 1999
(27085) 1998 UA1	October 19, 1998
(27219) 1999 EL	March 9, 1999
(29822) 1999 DS2	February 19, 1999
(31246) 1998 DZ12	February 24, 1998
(33431) 1999 EK	March 9, 1999
(39808) 1997 WQ25	November 25, 1997
(39842) 1998 BV25	January 29, 1998
(40171) 1998 RS	September 11, 1998
(44474) 1998 WE	November 16, 1998
(44478) 1998 WK6	November 23, 1998
(44886) 1999 VF1	November 4, 1999
(44903) 1999 VR19	November 12, 1999
(47030) 1998 VG32	November 12, 1998
(49297) 1998 VY4	November 11, 1998
(58584) 1997 SE11	September 29, 1997
(65889) 1998 BB4	January 23, 1998
(68009) 2000 YD4	December 21, 2000
(70426) 1999 TN	October 1, 1999
(70733) 1999 VV6	November 8, 1999
(74791) 1999 SW6	September 30, 1999
(80249) 1999 WB9	November 30, 1999
(91906) 1999 VE24	November 15, 1999
(100640) 1997 VY3	November 7, 1997
(103576) 2000 CG1	February 4, 2000

Tom Stafford is an American astronomer who has discovered a number of asteroids since 1997, including 12061 Alena, 12533 Edmond, 13436 Enid, 13688 Oklahoma and 15904 Halstead at Zeno Observatory (observatory code 727) in Edmond, Oklahoma. He is the son of Joseph W. Stafford and Alena Ruth Robbins, both now deceased, and has a sister, Susan Halstead.
