= List of Golden Key International Honour Society chapters =

The Golden Key International Honour Society is a collegiate honor society and non-profit organization based in the United States. It was founded in 1977 at Georgia State University and became an international society with the chartering of a chapter at the University of Queensland in 1993. Following is a list of Golden Key chapters, with inactive institutions in italics.

Chapter	Charter date and range	Institution	Location	State, province, region, or territory	Status	Ref.
	2010	Albany State University	Albany, Georgia	GA	Inactive	
	2013	Alcorn State University	Lorman, Mississippi	MS	Active	
367	April 11, 2008	American Public University System	Manassas, Virginia	VA	Active	
		American Sentinel University	Aurora, Colorado	CO	Active	
154	April 26, 1990	American University	Washington, D.C.	DC	Active	
		American University in Dubai	Dubai Media City, Dubai, United Arab Emirates		Inactive	
	2013	Appalachian State University	Boone, North Carolina	NC	Active	
	May 9, 1982	Arizona State University	Tempe, Arizona	AZ	Active	
322	April 24, 2002	Arkansas State University	Jonesboro, Arkansas	AR	Active	
212	May 17, 1994	Auburn University	Auburn, Alabama	AL	Active	
375	October 11, 2009	Augusta State University	Augusta, Georgia	GA	Inactive	
		Austin Peay State University	Clarksville, Tennessee	TN	Active	
	June 2013	Australian Catholic University	Banyo, Queensland, Australia	QLD	Active	
	1995	Australian National University	Canberra, Australian Capital Territory, Australia	ACT	Active	
254	April 23, 1997	Babson College	Babson Park, Massachusetts	MA	Inactive	
	November 11, 1978	Ball State University	Muncie, Indiana	IN	Active	
143	December 7, 1989	Baruch College	New York City	NY	Active	
133	April 23, 1989	Baylor University	Waco, Texas	TX	Active	
418	June 20, 2012	Bethune–Cookman University	Daytona Beach, Florida	FL	Inactive	
		Binghamton University	Binghamton, New York	NY	Inactive	
	March 21, 2002	Bishop's University	Sherbrooke, Quebec, Canada	QUE	Inactive	(Note: This chapter withdrew and became the local Bishop's University Academic Honours Society.)
	April 17, 1997	Boise State University	Boise, Idaho	ID	Active	
	November 2024	Boston City Campus and Business College	Orange Grove, Gauteng, South Africa	GT	Active	
97	April 23, 1987	Boston College	Chestnut Hill, Massachusetts	MA	Active	
78	April 14, 1986	Boston University	Boston, Massachusetts	MA	Active	
		Botho University	Gaborone, South-East District, Botswana	SE	Active	
	February 2010	Bowie State University	Bowie, Maryland	MD	Active	
35	April 23, 1983	Bowling Green State University	Bowling Green, Ohio	OH	Active	
	February 28, 2011	Brandon University	Brandon, Manitoba, Canada	MAN	Inactive	
	March 1985	Brigham Young University	Provo, Utah	UT	Active	
429	July 24, 2013	Brock University	St. Catharines, Ontario, Canada	ON	Active	
169	May 14, 1991	Brooklyn College CUNY	Brooklyn, New York City	NY	Inactive	
	May 1987	California Polytechnic State University, San Luis Obispo	San Luis Obispo, California	CA	Active	
		California Southern University, Costa Mesa	Costa Mesa, California	CA	Inactive	(Note: The university closed its Costa Mesa campus as part of the merger with American InterContinental University.)
		California State Polytechnic University, Pomona	Pomona, California	CA	Inactive	
		California State University, Chico	Chico, California	CA	Active	
	February 20, 1987	California State University, East Bay	Hayward, California	CA	Active	
	May 8, 1985	California State University, Fresno	Fresno, California	CA	Active	
		California State University, Fullerton	Fullerton, California	CA	Active	
		California State University, Long Beach	Long Beach, California	CA	Active	
55	May 30, 1984	California State University, Los Angeles	Los Angeles, California	CA	Active	
	May 1983	California State University, Northridge	Northridge, Los Angeles, California	CA	Active	
48	April 31, 1984	California State University, Sacramento	Sacramento, California	CA	Active	
	May 2002	California State University, San Bernardino	San Bernardino, California	CA	Active	
	May 24, 2007	California State University, San Marcos	San Marcos, California	CA	Active	
	2009	Cape Peninsula University of Technology	Cape Town, Western Cape, South Africa	WC	Active	
	2017	Carleton University	Ottawa, Ontario, Canada	ONT	Active	
192	April 30, 1993	Case Western Reserve University	Cleveland, Ohio	OH	Active	
	2015	Centenary University	Hackettstown, New Jersey	NJ	Active	
240	May 5, 1996	Central Connecticut State University	New Britain, Connecticut	CT	Active	
		Central Michigan University	Mount Pleasant, Michigan	MI	Active	
	2022	Central State University	Wilberforce, Ohio	OH	Active	
	2023	Central University of Technology, Free State	Bloemfontein, Free State, South Africa	FS	Active	
		Charles Sturt University	Bathurst, New South Wales, Australia	NSW	Inactive	
	2015	Cincinnati Christian University	Cincinnati, Ohio	OH	Active	
70	May 8, 1985	City College of the City University of New York	New York City	NY	Active	
		Claflin University	Orangeburg, South Carolina	SC	Active	
	April 19, 2001	Clark Atlanta University	Atlanta, Georgia	GA	Active	
358	February 17, 2007	Clayton State University	Morrow, Georgia	GA	Active	
	April 22, 1986	Clemson University	Clemson, South Carolina	SC	Active	
123	May 22, 1988	Cleveland State University	Cleveland, Ohio	OH	Active	
373	July 2, 2009	Coastal Carolina University	Conway, South Carolina	SC	Active	
265	April 19, 1998	College of Charleston	Charleston, South Carolina	SC	Inactive	
	2013	College of Coastal Georgia	Brunswick, Georgia	GA	Active	
	March 4, 2001	The College of New Jersey	Ewing Township, New Jersey	NJ	Active	
	April 17, 1994	College of William & Mary	Williamsburg, Virginia	VA	Active	
		Colorado School of Mines	Golden, Colorado	CO	Active	
		Colorado State University	Fort Collins, Colorado	CO	Active	
	2013	Colorado State University–Global Campus	Greenwood Village, Colorado	CO	Active	
400	January 17, 2011	Colorado State University Pueblo	Pueblo, Colorado	CO	Active	
303	November 28, 2000	Columbia University	New York City	NY	Inactive	
306	March 19, 2001	Concordia University	Montreal, Quebec, Canada	QUE	Active	
		Coppin State University	Baltimore, Maryland	MD	Active	
		Cornell University	Ithaca, New York	NY	Active	
		CQUniversity Australia, Sydney	Glebe, New South Wales, Australia	NSW	Inactive	
		CQUniversity Australia, Norman Gardens	Rockhampton, Queensland, Australia	QLD	Active	
		Curtin University	Perth, Western Australia, Australia	WA	Inactive	
318	November 1, 2001	Dalhousie University	Halifax, Nova Scotia, Canada	NS	Active	
193	May 9, 1993	Dartmouth College	Hanover, New Hampshire	NH	Inactive	
		Deakin University	Burwood, Victoria, Australia	VIC	Active	
407	2012	Dean College	Franklin, Massachusetts	MA	Active	
		Delhi University	New Delhi, Delhi, India		Active	
139	May 21, 1989	DePaul University	Chicago, Illinois	IL	Active	
		DeVry University, Indianapolis	Indianapolis, Indiana	IN	Inactive	(Note: DeVry University closed its Indianapolis campus.)
	August 1, 2003	DeVry University, New Jersey	North Brunswick, New Jersey	NJ	Active	
		Dillard University	New Orleans, Louisiana	LA	Inactive	
	May 10, 1995	Drexel University	Philadelphia, Pennsylvania	PA	Inactive	
106	December 2, 1987	Duke University	Durham, North Carolina	NC	Inactive	
276	March 22, 1999	Duquesne University	Pittsburgh, Pennsylvania	PA	Inactive	
		Durban University of Technology	Durban, KwaZulu-Natal, South Africa	KZN	Active	
164	April 23, 1991	East Carolina University	Greenville, North Carolina	NC	Active	
	November 12, 2000	East Tennessee State University	Johnson City, Tennessee	TN	Active	
		East Texas A&M University	Commerce, Texas	TX	Inactive	
	2013	Eastern Illinois University	Charleston, Illinois	IL	Active	
151	April 22, 1990	Eastern Kentucky University	Richmond, Kentucky	KY	Active	
	April 19, 1983	Eastern Michigan University	Ypsilanti, Michigan	MI	Inactive	
397	January 10, 2011	ECPI University	Virginia Beach, Virginia	VA	Active	
390	October 27, 2010	Edison State College	Fort Myers, Florida	FL	Inactive	
		Edinboro University of Pennsylvania	Edinboro, Pennsylvania	PA	Inactive	
		Edith Cowan University, Joondalup	Joondalup, Western Australia, Australia	WA	Active	
		Edith Cowan University, Mount Lawley	Mount Lawley, Western Australia, Australia	WA	Inactive	
	2023	Eduvos	Pretoria, Gauteng, South Africa	GT	Active	
		Fairfax University of America	Fairfax, Virginia	VA	Active	(Note: Chapter formed at Virginia International University, now Fairfax University of America.)
369	November 25, 2008	Farmingdale State College	East Farmingdale, New York	NY	Active	
		Federation University Australia	Victoria, Australia	VIC	Active	
	March 4, 2004	Ferris State University	Big Rapids, Michigan	MI	Inactive	
	2012	Fisher College	Boston, Massachusetts	MA	Active	
		Flinders University	Bedford Park, South Australia, Australia	SA	Active	
		Florida A&M University	Tallahassee, Florida	FL	Active	
252	April 20, 1997	Florida Atlantic University	Boca Raton, Florida	FL	Active	
281	April 25, 1999	Florida Gulf Coast University	Fort Myers, Florida	FL	Active	
202	March 8, 1994	Florida International University	Miami, Florida	FL	Active	
46	March 15, 1984	Florida State University	Tallahassee, Florida	FL	Active	
		Gargi College	Delhi, India		Active	
117	May 4, 1988	George Mason University	Fairfax, Virginia	VA	Active	
	September 22, 2010	George Washington University	Washington, D.C.	DC	Active	
98	April 26, 1987	Georgia Tech	Atlanta, Georgia	GA	Active	
180	June 2, 1992	Georgia Southern University	Statesboro, Georgia	GA	Active	
1	November 29, 1977	Georgia State University	Atlanta, Georgia	GA	Active	
239	April 25, 1996	Grambling State University	Grambling, Louisiana	LA	Active	
	1996	Griffith University	Nathan, Queensland, Australia	QLD	Active	
		Grove City College	Grove City, Pennsylvania	PA	Active	
	March 18, 1995	Hampton University	Hampton, Virginia	VA	Active	
		Hansraj College	Delhi, India		Active	
200	December 1, 1993	Hofstra University	Hempstead, New York	NY	Active	
	2020	Hong Kong Metropolitan University	Kowloon, Hong Kong		Active	
	March 27, 1986	Howard University	Washington, D.C.	DC	Active	
179	May 15, 1992	Hunter College	New York City	NY	Active	
396	December 16, 2010	Huston–Tillotson University	Austin, Texas	TX	Active	
	April 1997	Idaho State University	Pocatello, Idaho	ID	Active	
25	April 27, 1982	Illinois State University	Normal, Illinois	IL	Active	
	May 2024	Independent Institute of Education	Sandton, Gauteng, South Africa	GT	Active	
	April 21, 1996	Indiana State University	Terre Haute, Indiana	IN	Active	
	March 25, 1984	Indiana University Bloomington	Bloomington, Indiana	IN	Active	
	2013	Indiana University of Pennsylvania	Indiana, Pennsylvania	IN	Active	
	May 2, 1999	Indiana University Indianapolis	Indianapolis, Indiana	IN	Active	(Note: Chapter was formed at Indiana Indiana University–Purdue University Indianapolis. IUPUI split into two separate universities, Indiana University Indianapolis and Purdue University in Indianapolis, on July 1, 2024.)
		Indraprastha College for Women	Delhi, India		Active	
242	May 8, 1996	Interamerican University of Puerto Rico, Metropolitan Campus	Cupey, San Juan, Puerto Rico	PR	Active	
		Interamerican University of Puerto Rico at Ponce	Ponce, Puerto Rico	PR	Active	
368	November 4, 2008	International Academy of Design and Technology	Tampa, Florida	FL	Inactive	(Note: The Academy closed in 2015.)
		International College of Tourism & Hotel Management	Sydney, Australia	NSW	Inactive	
		International Islamic University Malaysia	Kuala Lumpur, Malaysia	KUL	Inactive	
		Iona University	New Rochelle, New York	NY	Active	
	April 29, 1987	Iowa State University	Ames, Iowa	IA	Active	
	2014	Jackson State University	Jackson, Mississippi	MS	Active	
		James Cook University	Townsland, Queensland, Australia	QLD	Active	
	March 2012	James Cook University Singapore	Central Region, Singapore	CR	Inactive	
	April 25, 1988	James Madison University	Harrisonburg, Virginia	VA	Inactive	
		Jesus and Mary College	Delhi, India		Active	
170	March 6, 1992	Johns Hopkins University	Baltimore, Maryland	MD	Active	
		Kamla Nehru College	Korba, Chhattisgarh, India		Active	
22	May 5, 1981	Kansas State University	Manhattan, Kansas	KS	Active	
	June 19, 2007 – March 2018	Kaplan University, Fort Lauderdale	Fort Lauderdale, Florida	FL	Moved	(Note: Kaplan University was sold to Purdue University in March 2018, changing from a for-profit online institution into Purdue University Global.)
		Kennesaw State University, Kennesaw campus	Kennesaw, Georgia	GA	Active	
		Kennesaw State University, Marietta campus	Marietta, Georgia	GA	Inactive	
134	April 24, 1989	Kent State University	Kent, Ohio	OH	Active	
		La Salle University	Philadelphia, Pennsylvania	PA	Active	
		La Trobe University, Melbourne	Bundoora, Victoria, Australia	VIC	Inactive	
	1997	La Trobe University	Macleod, Victoria, Australia	VIC	Active	
		Lady Shri Ram College	New Delhi, Delhi, India		Active	
		Lamar University	Beaumont, Texas	TX	Active	
		Landmark College	Putney, Vermont	VT	Active	
	1986	Lehman College	Bronx, New York City, New York	NY	Active	
174	April 20, 1992	Louisiana State University	Baton Rouge, Louisiana	LA	Inactive	
251	April 17, 1997	Louisiana Tech University	Ruston, Louisiana	LA	Active	
163	December 2, 1990	Loyola University Chicago	Chicago, Illinois	IL	Active	
	2014	Lynn University	Boca Raton, Florida	FL	Active	
393	November 16, 2010	MacEwan University	Edmonton, Alberta, Canada	ALB	Active	
		Macquarie University	Melbourne, Australia	VIC	Active	
323	April 28, 2002	Marshall University	Huntington, West Virginia	WV	Active	
	2012	McDaniel College	Westminster, Maryland	MD	Active	
246	April 7, 1997	McGill University	Montreal, Quebec, Canada	QUE	Active	
263	April 8, 1998	McMaster University	Hamilton, Ontario, Canada	ONT	Active	
	2013	Mercer University	Macon, Georgia	GA	Active	
		Mercy University	Dobbs Ferry, New York	NY	Active	
		Metropolitan State University of Denver	Denver, Colorado	CO	Active	
		Miami Dade College	Miami, Florida	FL	Active	
	April 22, 1986	Miami University	Oxford, Ohio	OH	Active	
	1980	Michigan State University	East Lansing, Michigan	MI	Active	
208	April 27, 1994	Middle Tennessee State University	Murfreesboro, Tennessee	TN	Active	
403	May 9, 2011	Midwestern State University	Wichita Falls, Texas	TX	Active	
	May 11, 1998	Minnesota State University, Mankato	Mankato, Minnesota	MN	Active	
		Minnesota State University Moorhead	Moorhead, Minnesota	MN	Active	
		Miranda House	New Delhi, Delhi, India		Active	
190	April 25, 1993	Mississippi State University	Mississippi State, Mississippi	MS	Active	
378	January 19, 2010	Mississippi Valley State University	Mississippi Valley State, Mississippi	MS	Active	
101	May 6, 1987	Missouri State University	Springfield, Missouri	MO	Active	
	1996	Monash University, Clayton Campus	Melbourne, Victoria, Australia	VIC	Active	
		Monash University Malaysia	Subang Jaya, Selangor, Malaysia	SGR	Active	
	April 1994	Montana State University	Bozeman, Montana	MT	Active	
278	April 20, 1999	Montclair State University	Montclair, New Jersey	NJ	Active	
		Morehouse College	Atlanta, Georgia	GA	Active	
218	March 2, 1995	Morgan State University	Baltimore, Maryland	MD	Active	
		Morris Brown College	Atlanta, Georgia	GA	Inactive	
	2015	Mount Royal University	Calgary, Alberta, Canada	ALB	Active	
		Multimedia University	Cyberjaya, Sepang, Selangor, Malaysia	SGR	Active	
	December 31, 2010	National University	San Diego, California	CA	Active	
		National University of Malaysia	Bandar Baru Bangi, Selangor, Malaysia	SGR	Active	
		Nelson Mandela University	Gqeberha, Eastern Cape, South Africa	EC	Inactive	
		New Jersey City University	Jersey City, New Jersey	NJ	Active	
	2015	New Mexico Institute of Mining and Technology	Socorro, New Mexico	NM	Active	
136	April 27, 1989	New Mexico State University	Las Cruces, New Mexico	NM	Active	
346	November 17, 2004	New York Institute of Technology	Old Westbury, New York	NY	Active	
	April 25, 1994	Norfolk State University	Norfolk, Virginia	VA	Active	
176	April 22, 1992	North Carolina A&T State University	Greensboro, North Carolina	NC	Active	
279	April 22, 1999	North Carolina Central University	Durham, North Carolina	NC	Active	
223	April 23, 1995	North Carolina State University	Raleigh, North Carolina	NC	Active	
235	November 21, 1995	North Dakota State University	Fargo, North Dakota	ND	Active	
		North-West University, Mafikeng Campus	Mafikeng, North West, South Africa	NW	Active	
		North-West University, Potchefstroom Campus	Potchefstroom, North West, South Africa	NW	Active	
	2000	North-West University, Vanderbijlpark Campus	Vanderbijlpark, North West, South Africa	NW	Active	
		Northeastern State University	Tahlequah, Oklahoma	OK	Inactive	
181	June 11, 1992	Northeastern University	Boston, Massachusetts	MA	Active	
	April 26, 1988	Northern Arizona University	Flagstaff, Arizona	AZ	Active	
63	April 25, 1985	Northern Illinois University	DeKalb, Illinois	IL	Active	
221	April 18, 1995	Northern Kentucky University	Highland Heights, Kentucky	KY	Active	
326	December 7, 1980	Northern Michigan University	Marquette, Michigan	MI	Active	
		Northern New Mexico College	Española, New Mexico	NM	Active	
195	May 25, 1993	Northwestern University	Evanston, Illinois	IL	Active	
		Nova Southeastern University, Tampa Bay Regional Campus	Tampa, Florida	FL	Active	
	April 19, 1981	Oakland University	Rochester, Michigan	MI	Active	
11	May 15, 1979	Ohio State University	Columbus, Ohio	OH	Active	
140	May 21, 1989	Ohio University	Athens, Ohio	OH	Active	
42	April 27, 1983	Oklahoma State University	Stillwater, Oklahoma	OK	Active	
	April 19, 1990	Old Dominion University	Norfolk, Virginia	VA	Active	
257	May 21, 1997	Oregon State University	Corvallis, Oregon	OR	Active	
		Pace University, Briarcliff Campus	Briarcliff Manor, New York	NY	Inactive	
326	April 29, 2002	Pace University, New York Campus	New York City	NY	Active	
327	April 29, 2002	Pace University, Pleasantville Campus	Pleasantville, New York	NY	Active	
	2013	Penn West Clarion	Clarion, Pennsylvania	PA	Active	(Note: Chapter formed at Clarion University of Pennsylvania, which became Penn West Clarion in 2021.)
	January 31, 1980	Pennsylvania State University	State College, Pennsylvania	PA	Active	
	March 1989	Pepperdine University, Malibu Campus	Malibu, California	CA	Active	
		Petroleum Institute	Abu Dhabi, United Arab Emirates		Active	
404	July 1, 2011	Polk State College, Lakeland Campus	Lakeland, Florida	FL	Active	
171	April 5, 1992	Portland State University	Portland, Oregon	OR	Inactive	
	December 9, 1982	Purdue University	West Lafayette, Indiana	IN	Active	
	March 2018	Purdue University Global	Chicago, Illinois	IL	Active	(Note: Chapter formed from the Kaplan University chapter when Purdue University purchased that institution.)
87	May 12, 1986	Queens College, City University of New York	Flushing, Queens, New York City	NY	Active	
		Queensland University of Technology	Brisbane, Queensland, Australia	QLD	Active	
		Ramanujan College	Kalkaji, South Delhi, India		Active	
	January 14, 2010	Ramapo College	Mahwah, New Jersey	NJ	Active	
		Rhodes University	Makhanda, Eastern Cape, South Africa	EC	Active	
264	April 12, 1998	Rice University	Houston, Texas	TX	Inactive	
	1993	Royal Melbourne Institute of Technology	Melbourne, Victoria, Australia	VIC	Active	
	2004	Royal Melbourne Institute of Technology Vietnam, Hanoi Campus	Ba Dinh, Hanoi, Vietnam		Active	
266	May 3, 1998	Rochester Institute of Technology	Rochester, New York	NY	Active	
		Roosevelt University	Schaumburg, Illinois	IL	Inactive	
	April 10, 2001	Rowan University	Glassboro, New Jersey	NJ	Active	
		Rutgers School of Health Professions	Newark, New Jersey	NJ	Active	
	November 22, 1987	Rutgers University–New Brunswick	New Brunswick, New Jersey	NJ	Inactive	
	April 26, 1999	Rutgers University–Newark	Newark, New Jersey	NJ	Active	
	April 7, 1999	Ryerson University	Toronto, Ontario, Canada	ONT	Inactive	
188	April 22, 1993	Saint Louis University	St. Louis, Missouri	MO	Active	
		Salem University	Salem, West Virginia	WV	Active	
20	April 27, 1981	Sam Houston State University	Huntsville, Texas	TX	Active	
	May 1, 1981	San Diego State University	San Diego, California	CA	Active	
71	May 8, 1985	San Francisco State University	San Francisco, California	CA	Active	
	May 7, 1985	San Jose State University	San Jose, California	CA	Active	
	March 16, 2009	Savannah State University	Savannah, Georgia	GA	Active	
		Schiller International University	Largo, Florida	FL	Active	
		Sefako Makgatho University	Pretoria, Gauteng, South Africa	GT	Active	
	November 11, 2004	Seton Hall University	South Orange, New Jersey	NJ	Active	
		Shaheed Bhagat Singh College	New Delhi, Delhi, India		Active	
291	March 30, 2000	Simon Fraser University	Burnaby, British Columbia, Canada	BC	Active	
285	April 28, 1999	Slippery Rock University	Slippery Rock, Pennsylvania	PA	Active	
		Sonoma State University	Rohnert Park, California	CA	Active	
	December 2024	South African College of Applied Psychology	Cape Town, Western Cape, South Africa	WCP	Active	
324	April 28, 2002	South Carolina State University	Orangeburg, South Carolina	SC	Active	
238	April 22, 1996	South Dakota State University	Brookings, South Dakota	SD	Active	
		South University Online	Pittsburgh, Pennsylvania	PA	Active	
	2012	South University Richmond	Glen Allen, Virginia	VA	Active	
		South University Virginia Beach	Virginia Beach, Virginia	VA	Active	
		Southern Arkansas University	Magnolia, Arkansas	AR	Active	
329	May 1, 2002	Southern Connecticut State University	New Haven, Connecticut	CT	Active	
		Southern Cross University	Lismore, New South Wales, Australia	NSW	Active	
27	May 4, 1982	Southern Illinois University Carbondale	Carbondale, Illinois	IL	Active	
321	April 21, 2002	Southern Illinois University Edwardsville	Edwardsville, Illinois	IL	Active	
	November 28, 1989	Southern Methodist University	Dallas, Texas	TX	Active	
201	November 28, 1989	Southern University	Baton Rouge, Louisiana	LA	Inactive	
	April 8, 2008	Southern Utah University	Cedar City, Utah	UT	Active	
	April 16, 1992	Spelman College	Atlanta, Georgia	GA	Active	
		Sri Guru Tegh Bahadur Khalsa College	New Delhi, Delhi, India		Active	
		Sri Venkateswara College	New Delhi, Delhi, India		Active	
	March 17, 2009	St. Cloud State University	St. Cloud, Minnesota	MN	Inactive	
	2013	St. Gregory's University	Shawnee, Oklahoma	OK	Active	
		St. John's University	Jamaica, Queens, New York City	NY	Active	
		St. John's University, Staten Island Campus	Staten Island, New York	NY	Inactive	(Note: The university's Staten Island campus closed in May of 2024.)
	2015	St. Mary's University, Texas	San Antonio, Texas	TX	Active	
407	February 9, 2011	St. Petersburg College	St. Petersburg, Florida	FL	Active	
		St. Stephen's College, Delhi	New Delhi, Delhi, India		Active	
	October 12, 2010	State University of New York at Canton	Canton, New York	NY	Active	
349	April 19, 2005	State University of New York at Fredonia	Fredonia, New York	NY	Active	
209	April 27, 1994	State University of New York at Geneseo	Geneseo, New York	NY	Active	
	September 5, 2000	Stellenbosch University	Stellenbosch, Western Cape, South Africa	WCP	Active	
357	May 3, 2007	Stephen F. Austin State University	Nacogdoches, Texas	TX	Active	
		Stockton University	Galloway Township, New Jersey	NJ	Active	
168	May 6, 1991	Stony Brook University	Stony Brook, New York	NY	Active	
415	September 1, 2011	Strayer University	Washington, D.C.	DC	Active	
		Sunway University	Petaling, Selangor, Malaysia	SGR	Inactive	
	2006	Swinburne University of Technology	Hawthorn, Victoria, Australia	VIC	Active	
	November 2012	Swinburne University of Technology Sarawak Campus	Kuching, Sarawak, Malaysia	SWK	Active	
137	April 27, 1989	Syracuse University	Syracuse, New York	NY	Active	
		Tarleton State University	Stephenville, Texas	TX	Active	
	April 20, 1988	Temple University	Philadelphia, Pennsylvania	PA	Active	
5	May 28, 1978	Tennessee State University	Nashville, Tennessee	TN	Active	
166	April 28, 1991	Texas A&M University	College Station, Texas	TX	Active	
		Texas A&M University–Central Texas	Killeen, Texas	TX	Active	
339	September 26, 2003	Texas A&M University–Corpus Christi	Corpus Christi, Texas	TX	Active	
	2012	Texas A&M University–Kingsville	Kingsville, Texas	TX	Active	
	April 17, 1990	Texas Christian University	Fort Worth, Texas	TX	Active	
255	April 23, 1997	Texas Southern University	Houston, Texas	TX	Active	
26	April 27, 1982	Texas State University	San Marcos, Texas	TX	Active	
60	April 16, 1985	Texas Tech University	Lubbock, Texas	TX	Active	
	April 22, 1992	Texas Woman's University	Denton, Texas	TX	Active	
		Touro College Los Angeles	West Hollywood, California	CA	Inactive	
228	May 9, 1995	Towson University	Towson, Maryland	MD	Active	
283	April 25, 1999	Trinity University	San Antonio, Texas	TX	Active	
	2020	Tshwane University of Technology	Pretoria, Gauteng, South Africa	GT	Active	
	1994	Tufts University	Medford, Massachusetts	MA	Inactive	
310	April 20, 2001	Tulane University	New Orleans, Louisiana	LA	Active	
186	April 19, 1993	Tuskegee University	Tuskegee, Alabama	AL	Active	
342	January 23, 2004	United States Military Academy	West Point, New York	NY	Active	
	1997	United States Naval Academy	Annapolis, Maryland	MD	Active	
		Universiti Malaysia Perlis	Arau, Perlis, Malaysia	PLS	Active	
		Universiti Malaysia Sarawak	Kota Samarahan, Sarawak, Malaysia	SWK	Active	
		Universiti Malaysia Terengganu	Kuala Nerus District, Terengganu, Malaysia	TRG	Active	
		University of Putra Malaysia	Serdang, Selangor, Malaysia	SGR	Active	
		Universiti Sains Malaysia	Gelugor, Penang, Malaysia	PNG	Active	
		Universiti Tun Abdul Razak	Kuala Lumpur, Malaysia	KUL	Active	
		Universiti Tunku Abdul Rahman	Kampar, Perak, Malaysia	PRK	Active	
		Universiti Utara Malaysia	Sintok, Kedah, Malaysia	KDH	Active	
329	May 1, 1990	University at Albany, State University of New York	Albany, New York	NY	Active	
129	April 6, 1989	University at Buffalo	Buffalo, New York	NY	Active	
		University of Adelaide	Adelaide, South Australia, Australia	SA	Active	
	May 4, 1988	University of Akron	Akron, Ohio	OH	Active	
37	April 20, 1983	University of Alabama	Tuscaloosa, Alabama	AL	Active	
		University of Alabama at Birmingham	Birmingham, Alabama	AL	Active	
189	April 24, 1993	University of Alaska Anchorage	Anchorage, Alaska	AK	Active	
187	April 24, 1993	University of Alaska Fairbanks	Fairbanks, Alaska	AK	Active	
		University of Alaska Southeast	Juneau, Alaska	AK	Inactive	
262	April 6, 1998	University of Alberta	Edmonton, British Columbia, Canada	BC	Active	
	April 24, 1983	University of Arizona	Tucson, Arizona	AZ	Active	
383	October 14, 2010	University of Arizona Global Campus	San Diego, California	CA	Active	
34	April 16, 1983	University of Arkansas	Fayetteville, Arkansas	AR	Active	
205	April 22, 1994	University of Arkansas at Little Rock	Little Rock, Arkansas	AR	Active	
		University of Ballarat	Ballarat, Victoria, Australia	VIC	Active	
		University of Bath	Bath, Somerset, South West England, England	SW	Inactive	
		University of Botswana	Gaborone, Botswana		Active	
274	November 16, 1998	University of British Columbia	Vancouver, British Columbia, Canada	BC	Active	
	2011	University of British Columbia Okanagan	Kelowna, British Columbia, Canada	BC	Active	
		University of California, Berkeley	Berkeley, California	CA	Active	
		University of California, Davis	Davis, California	CA	Active	
	June 2, 1988	University of California, Irvine	Irvine, California	CA	Active	
	June 5, 1983	University of California, Los Angeles	Los Angeles, California	CA	Active	
	May 24, 1993	University of California, Riverside	Riverside, California	CA	Active	
		University of California, San Diego	La Jolla, San Diego, California	CA	Active	
		University of California, Santa Barbara	Santa Barbara, California	CA	Active	
	October 7, 2008	University of California, Santa Cruz	Santa Cruz, California	CA	Active	
	2002	University of Canberra	Canberra, Australian Capital Territory, Australia	ACT	Active	
		University of Canterbury	Christchurch, Canterbury, New Zealand	CAN	Active	
		University of Cape Town	Rondebosch, Western Cape, South Africa	WCP	Active	
		University of Central Arkansas	Conway, Arkansas	AR	Active	
	April 17, 1987	University of Central Florida	Orlando, Florida	FL	Active	
330	May 5, 2002	University of Central Oklahoma	Edmond, Oklahoma	OK	Active	
	May 11, 1987	University of Cincinnati	Cincinnati, Ohio	OH	Active	
62	April 23, 1985	University of Colorado Boulder	Boulder, Colorado	CO	Active	
59	March 29, 1985	University of Colorado Denver	Denver, Colorado	CO	Active	
157	April 30, 1990	University of Connecticut	Storrs, Connecticut	CT	Active	
	April 13, 1987	University of Dayton	Dayton, Ohio	OH	Active	
	May 18, 1988	University of Delaware	Newark, Delaware	DE	Active	
29	May 17, 1982	University of Denver	Denver, Colorado	CO	Active	
		University of the District of Columbia	Washington, D.C.	D.C.	Inactive	
4	May 23, 1978	University of Florida	Gainesville, Florida	FL	Active	
3	May 18, 1978	University of Georgia	Athens, Georgia	GA	Active	
		University of Guam	Mangilao, Guam	GU	Active	
130	April 10, 1989	University of Hawaiʻi at Mānoa	Honolulu, Hawaii	HI	Active	
405	October 10, 2011	University of Hawaiʻi at West Oʻahu	Kapolei, Hawaii	HI	Active	
10	April 28, 1979	University of Houston	Houston, Texas	TX	Active	
	2013	University of Houston–Downtown	Houston, Texas	TX	Active	
	April 1990	University of Idaho	Moscow, Idaho	ID	Active	
56	May 31, 1984	University of Illinois Chicago	Chicago, Illinois	IL	Active	
19	April 27, 1981	University of Illinois Urbana-Champaign	Urbana, Illinois	IL	Active	
		University of Iowa	Iowa City, Iowa	IA	Inactive	
		University of Johannesburg	Johannesburg, Gauteng, South Africa	GP	Active	
	April 4, 1989	University of Kansas	Lawrence, Kansas	KS	Active	
83	April 27, 1986	University of Kentucky	Lexington, Kentucky	KY	Active	
		University of KwaZulu-Natal	Durban, KwaZulu-Natal, South Africa	KZN	Active	
	2018	University of Lethbridge	Lethbridge, Alberta, Canada	ALB	Active	
49	April 19, 1984	University of Louisville	Louisville, Kentucky	KY	Active	
280	April 22, 1999	University of Maine	Orono, Maine	ME	Active	
226	May 7, 1995	University of Maryland, Baltimore County	Catonsville, Maryland	MD	Active	
	May 7, 1985	University of Maryland, College Park	College Park, Maryland	MD	Active	
352	November 16, 2005	University of Maryland Eastern Shore	Princess Anne, Maryland	MD	Active	
76	April 13, 1986	University of Massachusetts Amherst	Amherst, Massachusetts	MA	Active	
213	May 19, 1994	University of Massachusetts Boston	Boston, Massachusetts	MA	Active	
294	May 8, 2000	University of Massachusetts Dartmouth	North Dartmouth, Massachusetts	MA	Active	
		University of Malaya	Kuala Lumpur, Selangor, Malaysia	SGR	Inactive	
8	November 27, 1978	University of Memphis	Memphis, Tennessee	TN	Active	
9	February 21, 1979	University of Miami	Coral Gables, Florida	FL	Active	
		University of Michigan	Ann Arbor, Michigan	MI	Active	
	March 30, 2006	University of Michigan–Dearborn	Dearborn, Michigan	MI	Active	
	December 3, 2003	University of Michigan–Flint	Flint, Michigan	MI	Active	
	May 29, 1982	University of Minnesota	Saint Paul, Minnesota	MN	Active	
	November 7, 2017	University of Minnesota Duluth	Duluth, Minnesota	MN	Inactive	
64	April 29, 1985	University of Mississippi	University, Mississippi	MS	Active	
65	May 3, 1985	University of Missouri	Columbia, Missouri	MO	Active	
108	April 18, 1988	University of Missouri–Kansas City	Kansas City, Missouri	MO	Active	
217	November 6, 1994	University of Missouri–St. Louis	St. Louis, Missouri	MO	Active	
	April 1993	University of Montana	Missoula, Montana	MT	Active	
220	March 21, 1995	University of Montevallo	Montevallo, Alabama	AL	Active	
81	April 23, 1986	University of Nebraska–Lincoln	Lincoln, Nebraska	NE	Active	
82	April 24, 1986	University of Nebraska Omaha	Omaha, Nebraska	NE	Active	
		University of Nevada, Las Vegas	Paradise, Nevada	NV	Active	
	April 29, 1990	University of Nevada, Reno	Reno, Nevada	NV	Active	
307	March 26, 2001	University of New Brunswick, St John	Saint John, New Brunswick, Canada	NB	Active	
		University of New England	Armidale, New South Wales, Australia	NSW	Active	
160	May 8, 1990	University of New Hampshire	Durham, New Hampshire	NH	Active	
33	March 30, 1983	University of New Mexico	Albuquerque, New Mexico	NM	Active	
147	April 17, 1990	University of New Orleans	New Orleans, Louisiana	LA	Active	
185	April 18, 1993	University of North Carolina at Chapel Hill	Chapel Hill, North Carolina	NC	Active	
146	April 17, 1990	University of North Carolina at Charlotte	Charlotte, North Carolina	NC	Active	
363	April 12, 2008	University of North Carolina at Greensboro	Greensboro, North Carolina	NC	Active	
		University of North Carolina at Pembroke	Pembroke, North Carolina	NC	Inactive	
234	April 14, 1996	University of North Dakota	Grand Forks, North Dakota	ND	Active	
107	March 10, 1988	University of North Florida	Jacksonville, Florida	FL	Active	
		University of North Georgia	Dahlonega, Georgia	GA	Active	
	April 27, 1987	University of North Texas	Denton, Texas	TX	Active	
289	November 17, 1999	University of Northern British Columbia	Prince George, British Columbia, Canada	BC	Active	
119	May 10, 1988	University of Northern Colorado	Greeley, Colorado	CO	Active	
	May 1, 2004	University of Northern Iowa	Cedar Falls, Iowa	IA	Active	
40	April 26, 1983	University of Oklahoma	Norman, Oklahoma	OK	Active	
		University of Oregon	Eugene, Oregon	OR	Active	
292	April 7, 2000	University of Ottawa	Ottawa, Ontario, Canada	ONT	Active	
	April 30, 1995	University of Pennsylvania	Philadelphia, Pennsylvania	PA	Inactive	
		University of Phoenix	Phoenix, Arizona	AZ	Active	
		University of Phoenix, Oregon	Tigard, Oregon	OR	Active	
109	April 18, 1988	University of Pittsburgh	Pittsburgh, Pennsylvania	PA	Active	
		University of Pretoria	Pretoria, Gauteng, South Africa	GP	Active	
241	May 7, 1996	University of Puerto Rico at Mayagüez	Mayagüez, Puerto Rico	PR	Active	
	January 1, 1988	University of Puerto Rico, Río Piedras Campus	San Juan, Puerto Rico	PR	Active	
		University of Putra Malaysia	Serdang, Selangor, Malaysia	SGR	Active	
	1993	University of Queensland	Brisbane, Queensland, Australia	QLD	Inactive	
	November 14, 2001	University of Regina	Regina, Saskatchewan, Canada	SK	Inactive	
96	April 22, 1987	University of Rhode Island	Kingston, Rhode Island	RI	Active	
	April 18, 1990	University of Richmond	Richmond, Virginia	VA	Active	
207	April 25, 1994	University of Rochester	Rochester, New York	NY	Active	
408	2012	University of Saint Joseph	West Hartford, Connecticut	CT	Active	
284	April 28, 1999	University of Saskatchewan	Saskatoon, Saskatchewan, Canada	SK	Active	
		University of Putra Malaysia	Pretoria, Gauteng, South Africa	GT	Active	
214	May 22, 1994	University of South Alabama	Mobile, Alabama	AL	Active	
		University of South Australia	Adelaide, South Australia, Australia	SA	Active	
40	April 26, 1983	University of South Carolina	Columbia, South Carolina	SC	Active	
236	April 22, 1996	University of South Dakota	Vermillion, South Dakota	SD	Active	
6	June 1, 1978	University of South Florida	Tampa, Florida	FL	Active	
		University of Southern California	Los Angeles, California	CA	Active	
	April 12, 1987	University of Southern Indiana	Evansville, Indiana	IN	Inactive	
253	April 22, 1997	University of Southern Maine	Portland, Maine	ME	Active	
51	May 1, 1984	University of Southern Mississippi	Hattiesburg, Mississippi	MS	Active	
		University of Southern Queensland	Toowoomba, Queensland, Australia	QLD	Active	
		University of Sydney	Darlington, South Australia, Australia	SA	Active	
		University of Technology Malaysia	Skudai, Johor Bahru, Malaysia	JHR	Active	
	1997	University of Tasmania, Hobart	Hobart, Tasmania, Australia	TAS	Active	
	2015	University of Tasmania, Launceston	Launceston, Tasmania, Australia	TAS		
		University of Technology Sydney	Glebe, New South Wales, Australia	NSW	Inactive	
14	February 28, 1980	University of Tennessee	Knoxville, Tennessee	TN	Active	
23	March 29, 1982	University of Tennessee at Chattanooga	Chattanooga, Tennessee	TN	Active	
	April 27, 1993	University of Texas at Arlington	Arlington, Texas	TX	Active	
	April 29, 1981	University of Texas at Austin	Austin, Texas	TX	Inactive	
	April 25, 1995	University of Texas at Dallas	Richardson, Texas	TX	Active	
126	March 7, 1989	University of Texas at El Paso	El Paso, Texas	TX	Active	
331	May 12, 2002	University of Texas Rio Grande Valley	Edinburg, Texas	TX	Active	(Note: Chapter formed at the University of Texas Pan American, which became the University of Texas Rio Grande Valley in 2013.)
150	April 18, 1990	University of Texas at San Antonio	San Antonio, Texas	TX	Active	
	2013	University of the Bahamas	Nassau, The Bahamas		Active	
		University of the Free State	Bloemfontein, Free State, South Africa	FS	Active	
	2013	University of the Incarnate Word	San Antonio, Texas	TX	Active	
402	April 3, 2011	University of the Rockies	Denver, Colorado	CO	Inactive	(Note: In October 2018, the university merged with Ashford University. It is now the University of Arizona Global Campus as part of the acquisition of Ashford University by the University of Arizona.)
		University of the Sunshine Coast	Sippy Downs, Queensland, Australia	QLD	Active	
230	May 11, 1995	University of the Virgin Islands, St. Croix Campus	Saint Croix, United States Virgin Islands	VI	Active	
231	May 12, 1995	University of the Virgin Islands, St. Thomas Campus	Saint Thomas, United States Virgin Islands	VI	Active	
	2001	University of the Western Cape	Bellville, Western Cape, South Africa	WCP	Active	
		University of the Witwatersrand	Braamfontein, Gauteng, South Africa	GP	Active	
	May 11, 1988	University of Toledo	Toledo, Ohio	OH	Active	
	April 11, 1997	University of Toronto	Toronto, Canada	ONT	Inactive	
	May 1984	University of Utah	Salt Lake City, Utah	UT	Active	
183	March 31, 1993	University of Vermont	Burlington, Vermont	VT	Active	
290	March 28, 2000	University of Victoria	Victoria, British Columbia, Canada	BC	Active	
	April 20, 1987	University of Virginia	Charlottesville, Virginia	VA	Active	
		University of Waikato	Hamilton, Waikato, New Zealand	WKO	Active	
54	May 28, 1984	University of Washington	Seattle, Washington	WA	Active	
	2013	University of Washington Tacoma	Tacoma, Washington	WA	Active	
		University of Waterloo	Waterloo, Ontario, Canada	ONT	Inactive	
248	April 13, 1997	University of West Florida	Pensacola, Florida	FL	Inactive	
	2020	University of West Georgia	Carrollton, Georgia	GA	Active	
		University of Western Australia	Crawley, Western Australia, Australia	WA	Active	
345	November 4, 2004	University of Windsor	Windsor, Ontario, Canada	ONT	Active	
430	July 24, 2013	University of Winnipeg	Winnipeg, Manitoba, Canada	MAN	Active	
	May 13, 1998	University of Wisconsin–Eau Claire	Eau Claire, Wisconsin	WI	Active	
	April 25, 1992	University of Wisconsin–La Crosse	La Crosse, Wisconsin	WI	Active	
	May 4, 1985	University of Wisconsin–Madison	Madison, Wisconsin	WI	Active	
	April 22, 1989	University of Wisconsin–Milwaukee	Milwaukee, Wisconsin	WI	Active	
	October 21, 2008	University of Wisconsin–Oshkosh	Oshkosh, Wisconsin	WI	Active	
		University of Wisconsin–Platteville	Platteville, Wisconsin	WI	Inactive	
		University of Wisconsin–Stout	Menomonie, Wisconsin	WI	Active	
	April 28, 1990	University of Wisconsin–Whitewater	Whitewater, Wisconsin	WI	Active	
		University of Wollongong	Woollongong, New South Wales, Australia	NSW	Active	
	May 5, 1990	University of Wyoming	Laramie, Wyoming	WY	Active	
	May 1986	Utah State University	Logan, Utah	UT	Active	
	November 2007	Utah Valley University	Orem, Utah	UT	Active	
337	April 23, 2003	Valdosta State University	Valdosta, Georgia	GA	Active	
	January 7, 2006	Victoria University	Footscray, Victoria, Australia	VIC	Active	
	April 30, 1990	Virginia Commonwealth University	Richmond, Virginia	VA	Active	
		Virginia State University	Ettrick, Virginia	VA	Active	
	February 25, 1986	Virginia Tech	Blacksburg, Virginia	VA	Active	
175	April 21, 1992	Wake Forest University	Winston-Salem, North Carolina	NC	Active	
	2013	Walden University	Minneapolis, Minnesota	MN	Active	
93	April 13, 1987	Washington State University	Pullman, Washington	WA	Active	
165	April 28, 1991	Washington University in St. Louis	St. Louis, Missouri	MO	Inactive	
	April 2, 1982	Wayne State University	Detroit, Michigan	MI	Active	
	May 1994	Weber State University	Ogden, Utah	UT	Active	
	June 8, 2016	West Texas A&M University	Canyon, Texas	TX	Active	
	October 23, 1979	West Virginia University	Morgantown, West Virginia	WV	Active	
325	April 28, 2002	Western Illinois University	Macomb, Illinois	IL	Active	
	November 2007	Western International University	Tempe, Arizona	AZ	Inactive	(Note: The university closed in February 2019.)
153	April 24, 1990	Western Kentucky University	Bowling Green, Kentucky	KY	Active	
	April 13, 1986	Western Michigan University	Kalamazoo, Michigan	MI	Active	
	May 27, 2001	Western Sydney University	Sydney, Australia	NSW	Active	
		Western Sydney University, Campbelltown Campus	Campbelltown, New South Wales, Australia	NSW	Inactive	
		Western Sydney University, Penrith Campus	Kingswood, New South Wales, Australia	NSW	Active	
295	May 21, 2000	Western Washington University	Bellingham, Washington	WA	Inactive	
84	April 27, 1986	Wichita State University	Wichita, Kansas	KS	Active	
	May 7, 1995	Winona State University	Winona, Minnesota	MN	Active	
	June 3, 1990	Wright State University	Dayton, Ohio	OH	Active	
377	January 18, 2010	York University	Toronto, Canada	ONT	Active	
	2017	Young Harris College	Young Harris, Georgia	GA	Active	
	May 22, 1989	Youngstown State University	Youngstown, Ohio	OH	Active	
