= List of Alpha Sigma Lambda chapters =

Alpha Sigma Lambda is an American honor society for non-traditional students in colleges and universities. It was established at Northwestern University in 1945. In the following chapter list, active chapters are indicated in bold and inactive chapters and institutions are in italics.

Chapter	Charter date	Institution	Location	Status	Ref.
**Alpha**	1945	Northwestern University	Evanston, Illinois	Active	
**Theta**		Tulane School of Professional Advancement	New Orleans, Louisiana	Active	
**Iota**		Lafayette College	Easton, Pennsylvania	Active	
**Mu**	1958	Villanova University	Villanova, Pennsylvania	Active	
**Xi**		Washington University in St. Louis	St. Louis, Missouri	Active	
**Omicron**		American International College	Springfield, Massachusetts	Active	
**Tau**		University of Maryland Global Campus	Adelphi, Maryland	Active	
**Psi**		Clark University	Worcester, Massachusetts	Active	
**Alpha Zeta**		Saint Joseph's University	Philadelphia, Pennsylvania	Active	
**Alpha Theta**		Widener University	Chester, Pennsylvania	Active	
Alpha Lambda (First) (see **Alpha Lambda**)	April 9, 2007	Ashford University	Clinton, Iowa	Moved	(Note: College was purchased and became University of Arizona Global Campus which moved to Arizona.)
**Alpha Lambda** (see Alpha Lambda First)	April 9, 2007	University of Arizona Global Campus	San Diego, California	Active	
**Alpha Nu**		University of Indianapolis	Indianapolis, Indiana	Active	
**Alpha Xi**		Drury University	Springfield, Missouri	Inactive	
**Alpha Phi**		Troy University at Montgomery	Montgomery, Alabama	Active	
**Alpha Chi**		University of Pittsburgh	Pittsburgh, Pennsylvania	Active	
**Alpha Omega**		King's College	Wilkes-Barre, Pennsylvania	Active	
**Beta Alpha**		University of Massachusetts Amherst	Amherst, Massachusetts	Active	
**Beta Delta**	1977	Syracuse University	Syracuse, New York	Active	
**Beta Zeta**		Rutgers University–New Brunswick	Piscataway, New Jersey	Active	
**Beta Theta**	2012	Manhattan University	Riverdale, Bronx, New York	Active	
**Beta Lambda**		Northern Vermont University	Lyndon, Vermont	Active	
**Beta Pi**		Thomas Jefferson University, East Falls Campus	Philadelphia, Pennsylvania	Active	
**Beta Rho**		Fordham University at Lincoln Center	New York City, New York	Active	
**Beta Upsilon**		Baldwin Wallace University	Berea, Ohio	Active	
**Beta Chi**		Misericordia University	Dallas, Pennsylvania	Active	
**Beta Phi**		Albright College	Reading, Pennsylvania	Active	
**Beta Omega**		University of Denver	Denver, Colorado	Active	
**Gamma Beta**		Albertus Magnus College	New Haven, Connecticut	Active	
**Gamma Delta**	c. 1985	University of Massachusetts Lowell	Lowell, Massachusetts	Active	
**Gamma Eta**	1982	Marist University	Poughkeepsie, New York	Active	
**Gamma Theta**		Furman University	Greenville, South Carolina	Active	
**Gamma Pi**	1984–1996; 2007	Morgan State University	Baltimore, Maryland	Active	
**Gamma Rho**		University of North Carolina at Charlotte	Charlotte, North Carolina	Active	
**Gamma Tau**		Georgetown University	Washington, D.C.	Active	
**Gamma Omega**		Elms College	Chicopee, Massachusetts	Active	
**Delta Beta**		Dean College	Franklin, Massachusetts	Active	
**Delta Beta**		Union University	Jackson, Tennessee	Active	
**Delta Gamma**		Centenary University	Hackettstown, New Jersey	Active	
**Delta Iota**		Le Moyne College	DeWitt, New York	Active	
**Delta Xi**		Immaculata University	East Whiteland Township, Pennsylvania	Active	
**Delta Pi**		Cedar Crest College	Allentown, Pennsylvania	Active	
**Delta Rho**		St. John's University	Queens, New York City, New York	Active	
**Delta Sigma**		Saint Louis University	St. Louis, Missouri	Active	
**Delta Tau**		Simpson College	Indianola, Iowa	Active	
**Delta Upsilon**		New York University	New York City, New York	Active	
**Delta Omega**		University of New Hampshire at Manchester	Manchester, New Hampshire	Active	
**Epsilon Beta**		Trinity Washington University	Washington, D.C.	Active	
**Epsilon Delta**		Penn State Berks	Spring Township, Pennsylvania	Active	
**Epsilon Xi**		Eastern Illinois University	Charleston, Illinois	Active	
**Epsilon Sigma**		Chestnut Hill College	Philadelphia, Pennsylvania	Active	
**Epsilon Tau**	April 9, 2015	Neumann University	Aston Township, Pennsylvania	Active	
**Epsilon Upsilon**		Rosemont College	Rosemont, Pennsylvania	Active	
**Zeta Pi**	2001	Penn State Mont Alto	Mont Alto, Pennsylvania	Active	
**Zeta Tau**		East Tennessee State University	Johnson City, Tennessee	Active	
**Zeta Upsilon**		Mercer University	Macon, Georgia	Active	
**Zeta Phi**		Maryville College	Maryville, Tennessee	Active	
**Zeta Chi**		Indiana University Indianapolis	Indianapolis, Indiana	Active	(Note: Chapter formed at Indiana University-Purdue University Indianapolis, now Indiana University Indianapolis.)
**Eta Beta**	1990	University of Nebraska Omaha	Omaha, Nebraska	Active	
**Eta Gamma**		State University of New York at Oswego	Oswego, New York	Active	
**Eta Delta**	1989	Murray State University	Murray, Kentucky	Active	
**Eta Zeta**		University of New Haven	West Haven, Connecticut	Active	
**Eta Lambda**		Providence College	Providence, Rhode Island	Active	
**Eta Omicron**		Delaware Valley College	Doylestown, Pennsylvania	Active	
**Eta Xi**		Penn State York	Spring Garden Townshi, Pennsylvania.	Active	
**Eta Rho**		Franklin Pierce University	Rindge, New Hampshire	Active	
**Eta Sigma**		Wittenberg University	Springfield, Ohio	Active	
**Eta Chi**		Muhlenberg College School of Continuing Studies	Allentown, Pennsylvania	Active	
**Eta Omega**		Missouri State University	Springfield, Missouri	Active	
**Theta Alpha**		Judson University	Elgin, Illinois	Active	
**Theta Alpha**		Loyola University Chicago	Chicago, Illinois	Active	
**Theta Zeta**		University of St. Thomas	Houston, Texas	Active	
**Theta Sigma**		Gwynedd Mercy University	Lower Gwynedd Township, Pennsylvania	Active	
**Theta Tau**		University of South Alabama	Mobile, Alabama	Active	
**Theta Chi**		Queens University of Charlotte	Charlotte, North Carolina	Active	
**Theta Psi**		Letourneau University	Longview, Texas	Active	
**Iota Gamma**		University of the Pacific	Stockton, California	Active	
**Iota Delta**		Bethune–Cookman University	Daytona Beach, Florida	Active	
**Iota Zeta**		Siena Heights University	Adrian, Michigan	Active	
**Iota Eta**		Strayer University - Memphis	Memphis, Tennessee	Active	
**Iota Iota**		Aquinas College	Grand Rapids, Michigan	Active	
**Iota Kappa**		Catholic University of America Metro College	Washington, D.C.	Active	
**Iota Nu**		Lindenwood University	St. Charles, Missouri	Active	
**Iota Sigma**		Rollins College	Winter Park, Florida	Active	
**Kappa Zeta**		Georgian Court University	Lakewood Township, New Jersey	Active	
**Kappa Eta**		Simpson University	Redding, California	Active	
**Kappa Theta**		Allegany College of Maryland	Cumberland, Maryland	Active	
**Kappa Kappa**		Brenau University	Gainesville, Georgia	Active	
**Kappa Lambda**		Martin University	Indianapolis, Indiana	Active	
**Kappa Upsilon**		Saint Francis University	Loretto, Pennsylvania	Active	
**Lambda Kappa**		Worcester State University	Worcester, Massachusetts	Active	
**Lambda Nu**		Lebanon Valley College	Annville Township, Pennsylvania	Active	
**Lambda Xi**		Belhaven University	Jackson, Mississippi	Inactive	
**Lambda Omicron**		State University of New York at Cortland	Cortland, New York	Active	
**Lambda Sigma**		Mercyhurst University	Erie, Pennsylvania	Active	
**Lambda Tau**		Thomas Edison State University	Trenton, New Jersey	Active	
**Mu Delta**		University of North Carolina at Pembroke	Pembroke, North Carolina	Active	
**Mu Epsilon**		Western Carolina University	Cullowhee, North Carolina	Active	
**Mu Kappa**		University of Mary Washington	Fredericksburg, Virginia	Active	
**Mu Lambda**		Elmhurst University	Elmhurst, Illinois	Active	
**Mu Rho**		Dominican University Priory Campus	Forest Park, Illinois	Active	
**Mu Sigma**		Mount St. Mary's University	Emmitsburg, Maryland	Active	
**Nu Eta**		Luzerne County Community College	Nanticoke, Pennsylvania	Active	
**Nu Kappa**		Embry–Riddle Aeronautical University, Orlando	Orlando, Florida	Active	
**Nu Lambda**		Columbia College–Online	Columbia, Missouri	Active	
**Xi Beta**		Champlain College	Burlington, Vermont	Active	
**Xi Gamma**		College of Charleston College of Business	Charleston, South Carolina	Active	
**Xi Delta**		Xavier University	Cincinnati, Ohio	Active	
**Xi Iota**		Wichita State University Campus of Applied Sciences and Technology	Wichita, Kansas	Active	
**Xi Lambda**		University of Massachusetts Global	Irvine, California	Active	
**Xi Mu**		Jackson State University	Jackson, Mississippi	Active	
**Xi Omega**	2021	Schreiner University	Kerrville, Texas	Active	
**Omicron Alpha**		Eastern New Mexico University	Portales, New Mexico	Active	
**Omicron Delta**		University of Mississippi - Desoto Campus	Southaven, Mississippi	Active	
**Omicron Epsilon**		Oregon State University	Corvallis, Oregon	Active	
**Omega Iota**		University of South Carolina Aiken	Aiken, South Carolina	Active	
**Omicron Pi**		Mount Saint Mary's University, Los Angeles	Los Angeles, California	Active	
**Omicron Sigma**		Southern Wesleyan University	Central, South Carolina	Active	
**Omicron Omega**		Friends University	Wichita, Kansas	Active	
**Pi Alpha**		Oklahoma Wesleyan University	Bartlesville, Oklahoma	Active	
**Pi Delta**		Labouré College of Healthcare	Milton, Massachusetts	Active	
**Pi Eta**		Purdue University Global	West Lafayette, Indiana	Active	
**Pi Theta**		Meredith College	Raleigh, North Carolina	Active	
**Pi Lambda**		Linfield University	McMinnville, Oregon	Active	
**Pi Rho**		Piedmont University, Athens Campus	Athens Georgia	Active	
**Pi Sigma**		Penn State Schuylkill	Schuylkill Haven, Pennsylvania	Active	
**Pi Upsilon**		Park University Kansas City Campus	Kansas City, Missiouri	Active	
**Pi Chi**		Plaza College	Forest Hills, Queens, New York	Active	(Note: Chapter was originally located at the Jackson Heights campus. That facility burned to the ground on April 21, 2014 shortly before a pre-planned move to Forest Hills. The campus later completed its move to Forest Hills.)
**Rho Alpha**		Roger Williams University	Bristol, Rhode Island	Active	
**Rho Epsilon**		Rockford University	Rockford, Illinois	Active	
**Rho Zeta**		University at Albany, SUNY	Albany, New York	Active	
**Rho Kappa**		Wilberforce University	Wilberforce, Ohio	Active	
**Rho Mu**		Robert Morris University	Moon Township, Pennsylvania	Active	
**Sigma Gamma**		Campbell University	Buies Creek, North Carolina	Active	
**Sigma Epsilon**		Suffolk County Community College, Riverhead Campus	Riverhead, New York	Active	
**Sigma Zeta**		Excelsior University	Albany, New York	Active	
**Sigma Eta**		Adelphi University College of Professional and Continuing Studies	Garden City, New York	Active	
**Sigma Iota**		Wichita State University	Wichita, Kansas	Active	
**Sigma Lambda**		Simmons College of Kentucky	Louisville, Kentucky	Active	
**Sigma Nu**		Colorado Christian University	Lakewood, Colorado	Active	
**Sigma Xi**		Suffolk County Community College, Grant Campus	Brentwood, New York	Active	
**Sigma Rho**		Texas Woman's University	Denton, Texas	Active	
**Sigma Tau**		Southwestern College Professional Studies	Wichita, Kansas	Active	
**Sigma Upsilon**		Samford University	Homewood, Alabama	Active	
**Sigma Phi**		Central Christian College of Kansas	McPherson, Kansas	Active	
**Sigma Chi**		Spelman College	Atlanta, Georgia	Active	
**Sigma Psi**		Southern New Hampshire University	Manchester, New Hampshire	Active	
**Tau Beta**		Texas State University	San Marcos, Texas	Active	
**Tau Gamma**		Temple University University College	Philadelphia, Pennsylvania	Active	
**Tau Delta**		James Madison University	Harrisonburg, Virginia	Active	
**Tau Kappa**		Vanguard University	Costa Mesa, California	Active	
**Tau Lambda**		Roberts Wesleyan University	Rochester, New York	Active	
**Tau Nu**		University of North Texas	Denton, Texas	Active	
**Tau Tau**		Tennessee Tech	Cookeville, Tennessee	Active	
**Tau Upsilon**	2022	North Carolina A&T State University	Greensboro, North Carolina	Active	
**Tau Psi**		Coastal Carolina University	Conway, South Carolina	Active	
**Upsilon Alpha**		University of Arkansas–Fort Smith	Fort Smith, Arkansas	Active	
**Upsilon Delta**		University of Denver - University College	Denver, Colorado	Active	
**Upsilon Zeta**		University of South Carolina Palmetto College	Columbia, South Carolina	Active	
**Upsilon Kappa**	August 25, 2023	Athens State University	Athens, Alabama	Active	
**Upsilon Nu**		Washburn University	Topeka, Kansas	Active	
**Upsilon Xi**		American InterContinental University Online	Chandler, Arizona	Active	
Upsilon Rho		Irvine Valley College	Irvine, California	Inactive	
**Upsilon Sigma**		Lehman College	Bronx, New York	Active	
**Upsilon Tau**		University of Tampa	Tampa, Florida	Active	
**Upsilon Chi**		Ursuline College	Pepper Pike, Ohio	Active	
**Upsilon Omega**		Hudson County Community College	Jersey City New Jersey	Active	
**Phi Beta**		Harvard Extension School	Cambridge, Massachusetts	Active	
**Phi Kappa**		Davenport University	Warren, Michigan	Active	
**Phi Lambda**		Thomas University	Thomasville, Georgia	Active	
**Phi Sigma**		Penn State Hazleton	Sugarloaf Township, Pennsylvania	Active	
**Phi Omega**		Stony Brook University	Stony Brook, New York	Active	
**Chi Alpha**		Southern Nazarene University	Bethany, Oklahoma	Active	
**Chi Delta**		Converse University	Spartanburg, South Carolina	Active	
**Chi Epsilon**		Elizabethtown College	Elizabethtown, Pennsylvania	Active	
**Chi Iota**		California Baptist University Online and Professional Studies	Riverside, California	Active	
**Chi Omicron**		Charter Oak State College	New Britain, Connecticut	Active	
**Chi Pi**		Simmons University	Boston, Massachusetts	Active	
**Chi Sigma**		Charleston Southern University	North Charleston, South Carolina	Active	
**Chi Tau**		Point Loma Nazarene University	San Diego, California	Active	
**Psi Kappa**		Kennedy–King College	Chicago, Illinois	Active	
**Psi Lambda**		Virginia Commonwealth University	Richmond, Virginia	Active	
**Psi Omega**		Nichols College	Dudley, Massachusetts	Active	
**Omega Zeta**		Columbia College	Columbia, Missouri	Active	
**Omega Theta**		Rider University	Lawrence Township, New Jersey	Active	
**Omega Rho**		California Lutheran University	Thousand Oaks, California	Active	
**Omega Tau**	2023	Empire State University	Saratoga Springs, New York	Active	
**Omega Upsilon**	2022	William Paterson University	Wayne, New Jersey	Active	
**Omega Omega**		Hampton University - University College	Hampton, Virginia	Active	
**Alpha Alpha Pi**		Avila University	Kansas City, Missouri	Active	
**Alpha Delta Alpha**		Warner University	Lake Wales, Florida	Active	
**Alpha Theta Psi**		Austin Peay State University	Clarksville, Tennessee	Active	
**Alpha Iota Lambda**		Waldorf University	Forest City, Iowa	Active	
**Alpha Nu Chi**		East Carolina University	Greenville, North Carolina	Active	
**Alpha Omega Epsilon**		Berkeley College, New York Campus	New York City, New York	Active	
**Beta Iota Sigma**		University of Virginia	Charlottesville, Virginia	Active	
**Beta Sigma Chi**		Catawba College	Salisbury, North Carolina	Active	
**Beta Upsilon Sigma**		University of Maine	Orono, Maine	Active	
**Beta Psi Alpha**		University of Hartford	West Hartford, Connecticut	Active	
**Gamma Beta Upsilon**	2005	Gardner-Webb University	Boiling Springs, North Carolina	Active	
**Gamma Sigma Rho**		University of the Incarnate Word	San Antonio, Texas	Active	
**Gamma Chi Epsilon**		Westfield State University - DGCE	Westfield, Massachusetts	Active	
**Gamma Omega Delta**		George Fox University	Newberg, Oregon	Active	
**Delta Kappa Mu**		Southwestern Christian University	Bethany, Oklahoma	Active	
**Delta Lambda Pi**		DePaul University	Chicago, Illinois	Active	
**Delta Phi Lambda**		Waubonsee Community College	Sugar Grove, Illinois	Active	
**Delta Chi Omega**		Wilmington University	New Castle, Delaware	Active	
**Zeta Omega Phi**		University of Michigan–Dearborn	Dearborn, Michigan	Active	
**Kappa Mu Chi**		Goodwin University	East Hartford, Connecticut	Active	
**Kappa Upsilon Pi**		Kutztown University of Pennsylvania	Kutztown, Pennsylvania	Active	
**Lambda Epsilon Delta**		Lewis University	Romeoville, Illinois	Active	
Lambda Chi Alpha		Lincoln Christian University	Lincoln, Illinois	Actie	(Note: The university closed on May 31, 2024.)
**Mu Kappa Lambda**		Mars Hill University	Mars Hill, North Carolina	Active	
**Mu Kappa Omega**		University of Saint Joseph	West Hartford, Connecticut	Active	
**Mu Chi Alpha**		Johnson C. Smith University	Charlotte, North Carolina	Active	
**Nu Zeta Sigma**		North Carolina Wesleyan University	Rocky Mount, North Carolina	Active	
**Nu Kappa Pi**		Northern Kentucky University	Highland Heights, Kentucky	Active	
**Nu Tau Epsilon**		Creighton University	Omaha, Nebraska	Inactive	
**Nu Phi Upsilon**		North Park University	Chicago, Illinois	Active	
**Pi Delta Chi**		Penn State World Campus	University Park, Pennsylvania	Active	
**Rho Sigma Delta**		Ramapo College	Mahwah, New Jersey	Active	
**Sigma Alpha Kappa**	2015	City College of New York	New York City, New York	Active	
**Sigma Lambda Sigma**		Grand Valley State University	Grand Rapids Michigan	Active	
**Sigma Delta Alpha**		Walden University	Minneapolis, Minnesota	Active	
**Sigma Tau Psi**		Southwest Tennessee Community College	Memphis, Tennessee	Active	
**Sigma Chi Nu**		Salem College	Winston-Salem, North Carolina	Active	
**Upsilon Mu Theta**		University of Mississippi - Tupelo Campus	Tupelo, Mississippi	Active	
**Upsilon Phi Beta**		University of Pittsburgh at Bradford	Bradford, Pennsylvania	Active	
**Chi Gamma Chi**		Columbia College at Highland Community College	Freeport, Illinois	Active	
**Chi Upsilon Iota**		Concordia University Chicago	River Forest, Illinois	Active	
**Chi Omega Sigma**		Southern University at Shreveport	Shreveport, Louisiana	Active	
**Psi Delta Omega**		Central Washington University	Ellensburg, Washington	Active	
		Alvernia University	Reading, Pennsylvania	Inactive	
		Anderson University	Anderson, Indiana	Inactive	
		Arkansas State University	Jonesboro, Arkansas	Inactive	
		Assumption College	Paxton, Massachusetts	Inactive	
		Barton Community College	Great Bend, Kansas	Inactive	
		Becker College	Worcester, Massachusetts	Inactive	
		Beloit College	Beloit, Wisconsin	Inactive	
		Benedict College	Columbia, South Carolina	Inactive	
		Benedictine University at Springfield	Springfield, Illinois	Inactive	
		Berkeley College, New Jersey Campus	Paramus, New Jersey	Inactive	
		Biola University	La Mirada, California	Inactive	
		Boston University	Boston, Massachusetts	Inactive	
		Brooklyn College	Brooklyn, New York City, New York	Inactive	
		Bryant & Stratton College, Cleveland Campus	Cleveland, Ohio	Inactive	
		Cabrini College	St. Davids, Pennsylvania	Inactive	
		Caldwell College	Caldwell, New Jersey	Inactive	
		California State Polytechnic University, Pomona	Pomona, California	Active	
		Canisius College	Buffalo, New York	Inactive	
		Carlow University	Pittsburgh, Pennsylvania	Inactive	
		Central State University	Wilberforce, Ohio	Inactive	
		Chatham University	Pittsburgh, Pennsylvania	Inactive	
		Chicago State University	Chicago, Illinois	Inactive	
		Coastline College	Fountain Valley, California	Inactive	
		College of Saint Rose	Albany, New York	Inactive	
		Columbia College	Columbia, South Carolina	Inactive	
		Columbia College at Elgin Community College	Elgin, Illinois	Inactive	
		Columbia College Evening Campus	Columbia, Missouri	Inactive	
		Columbia College–Fort Leonard Wood	Ft. Leonard Wood, Missouri	Inactive	
		Columbia College–Lake County/Great Lakes	Gurnee, Illinois	Inactive	(Note: This campus has closed.)
		Columbia College of Missouri–Crystal Lake	Crystal Lake, Illinois	Inactive	
		Columbia College of Missouri–Los Alamitos	Los Alamitos, California	Inactive	
		Columbia College of Missouri–Rolla	Rolla, Missouri	Inactive	
		Columbia–Greene Community College	Hudson, New York	Inactive	
		Concordia College	Bronxville, New York	Inactive	(Note: The college closed in 2021.)
		Concordia University Texas	Austin, Texas	Inactive	
		Dallas Baptist University	Dallas, Texas	Active	
		Davidson County Community College	Lexington, North Carolina	Inactive	
		DeSales University	Center Valley, Pennsylvania	Inactive	
		Devry University - Naperviille Center and Online	Naperville, Illinois	Inactive	
		DeVry University, Tinley Park	Tinley Park, Illinois	Inactive	
		Dominican University	River Forest, Illinois	Inactive	
		Duquesne University	Pittsburgh, Pennsylvania	Active	
		Eastern Nazarene College	Quincy, Massachusetts	Inactive	
		Eastern University	St. Davids, Pennsylvania	Inactive	
		Edinboro University of Pennsylvania	Edinboro, Pennsylvania	Inactive	
		Elmira College	Elmira, New York	Inactive	
		Embry–Riddle Aeronautical University, Daytona Beach	Daytona Beach, Florida	Inactive	
		Fairfield University	Fairfield, Connecticut	Inactive	
		Fitchburg State University	Fitchburg, Massachusetts	Inactive	
		Florida Atlantic University	Boca Raton, Florida	Inactive	
		Forbes School of Business & Technology	San Diego, California		
		Gonzaga University	Spokane, Washington	Inactive	
		Governors State University	University Park, Illinois	Inactive	
		Grand Canyon University	Phoenix, Arizona	Inactive	
		Grand View University	Des Moines, Iowa	Inactive	
		Granite State College	Concord, New Hampshire	Inactive	(Note: In 2023, the college merged into the University of New Hampshire as the College of Professional Studies at the University of New Hampshire at Manchester.)
		Hawaii Pacific University	Honolulu, Hawaii	Inactive	
		Heidelberg University - Arrowhead Park	Maumee, Ohio	Inactive	
		Henderson State University	Arkadelphia, Arkansas	Inactive	
		High Point University	High Point, North Carolina	Inactive	
		Holy Family University	Philadelphia, Pennsylvania	Inactive	
		Holy Family University - Woodhaven	Bensalem, Pennsylvania	Inactive	
		Hope International University	Fullerton, California	Inactive	
		Indiana University East	Richmond, Indiana	Inactive	
		Iona College	New Rochelle, New York	Inactive	
		Jones County Junior College	Ellisville, Mississippi	Inactive	
		Judson College	Marion, Alabama	Inactive	(Note: The college closed in July 2021.)
		Kean University	Union Township, Union County, New Jersey	Inactive	
		Kent State University	Kent, Ohio	Inactive	
		Kentucky State University	Frankfort, Kentucky	Inactive	
		Keuka College	Keuka Park, New York	Inactive	
		La Salle University	Philadelphia, Pennsylvania	Inactive	
		Lagrange College	LaGrange, Georgia	Inactive	
		Lincoln College–Normal	Normal, Illinois	Inactive	(Note: Lincoln College closed both of its campuses on May 13, 2022.)
		Livingstone College	Salisbury, North Carolina	Inactive	
		Long Island University, C.W. Post Campus	Brookville, New York	Inactive	
		Lyndon State College	Lyndon, Vermont	Inactive	(Note: In 2018, the college merged with Johnson State College to create Northern Vermont University.)
		Malone University	Canton, Ohio	Inactive	
		Marietta College	Marietta, Ohio	Inactive	
		Marquette University	Milwaukee, Wisconsin	Inactive	
		Mary Baldwin College	Staunton, Virginia	Inactive	
		Marylhurst University	Marylhurst, Oregon	Inactive	(Note: The university closed in 2018.)
		Merrimack College	North Andover, Massachusetts	Inactive	
		Methodist University	Fayetteville, North Carolina	Inactive	
		Millikin University	Decatur, Illinois	Inactive	
		Moravian College	Bethlehem, Pennsylvania	Inactive	
		Mount Saint Mary College	Newburgh, New York	Inactive	
		National American University	Albuquerque, New Mexico	Inactive	
		Nebraska Wesleyan University	Lincoln, Nebraska	Inactive	
		New School for Social Research	New York City, New York	Inactive	
		Northeast State Community College	Blountville, Tennessee	Inactive	
		Northeastern University	Boston, Massachusetts	Inactive	
		Northwest Missouri State University	Maryville, Missouri	Inactive	
		Northwest University	Kirkland, Washington	Inactive	
		Notre Dame of Maryland University	Baltimore, Maryland	Inactive	
		Ohio Dominican University	Columbus, Ohio	Inactive	
		Oklahoma City University	Oklahoma City, Oklahoma	Inactive	
		Ottawa University	Ottawa, Kansas	Inactive	
		Palm Beach Atlantic University	West Palm Beach, Florida	Inactive	
		Penn State Abington	Abington, Pennsylvania	Inactive	
		Pennsylvania State University Erie	Erie, Pennsylvania	Inactive	
		Pennsylvania State University, Harrisburg	Lower Swatara Township, Pennsylvania	Inactive	
		Pennsylvania State University, New Kensington	New Kensington, Pennsylvania	Inactive	
		Pennsylvania State University, Wilkes-Barre	Lehman Township, Pennsylvania	Inactive	
		Piedmont College, Demorest Campus	Demorest, Georgia	Inactive	
		Purdue University	West Lafayette, Indiana	Inactive	
		Purdue University North Central	Westville, Indiana	Inactive	
		Queens College, City University of New York	Flushing, Queens, New York	Inactive	
		Queensborough Community College	Bayside, Queens, New York City, New York	Inactive	
		Quinnipiac University	Hamden, Connecticut	Inactive	
		Randolph College	Lynchburg, Virginia	Inactive	
		Raymond Walters College	Blue Ash, Ohio.	Inactive	
		Richard Stockton College of New Jersey	Pomona, New Jersey	Inactive	
		Rochester College	Rochester Hills, Michigan	Inactive	
		Roosevelt University, Schaumberg Campus	Schaumberg, Illinois	Inactive	
		Rutgers University–Camden	Camden, New Jersey	Inactive	
		Rutgers University–Newark	Newark, New Jersey	Inactive	
		Sacred Heart University	Fairfield, Connecticut	Inactive	
		Sage College of Albany	Albany, New York	Inactive	(Note: The college became a campus of the Russell Sage College in 2020.)
		St. Augustine's University	Raleigh, North Carolina	Inactive	
		St. Edward's University	Austin, Texas	Inactive	
		St. John Fisher College	Rochester, New York	Inactive	
		Saint Mary's University of San Antonio	San Antonio, Texas	Inactive	
		Saint Paul's College	Lawrenceville, Virginia	Inactive	(Note: The college closed in June 2013.)
		Saint Peter's College	Jersey City, New Jersey	Inactive	
		Salem State University	Salem, Massachusetts	Inactive	
		Seton Hill University	Greensburg, Pennsylvania	Inactive	
		Sonoma State University	Rohnert Park, California	Inactive	
		Southeastern University	Lakeland, Florida	Inactive	
		Stevenson University, Ownings Mills	Ownings Mills, Maryland	Inactive	
		Strayer University - Knoxville	Knoxville, Tennessee	Inactive	
		Strayer University - Nashville	Nashville, Tennessee	Inactive	
		Strayer University - Shelby Oaks	Memphis, Tennessee	Inactive	
		Strayer University - Woodbridge	Woodbridge, Virginia	Inactive	
		Tarleton State University	Stephenville, Texas	Inactive	
		Temple University Ambler	Upper Dublin Township, Pennsylvania	Inactive	
		Tennessee State University	Nashville, Tennessee	Inactive	
		Texas A&M University	College Station, Texas	Inactive	
		Troy University at Pensacola	Pensacola, Florida	Inactive	
		University of Akron	Akron, Ohio	Inactive	
		University of Alabama	Tuscaloosa, Alabama	Inactive	
		University of Arkansas at Little Rock	Little Rock, Arkansas	Inactive	
		University of Bridgeport	Bridgeport, Connecticut	Inactive	
		University of Connecticut	Storrs, Connecticut	Inactive	
		University of Evansville	Evansville, Indiana	Inactive	
		University of Idaho	Moscow, Idaho	Inactive	
		University of Missouri–Kansas City	Kansas City, Missouri	Inactive	
		University of Mobile	Mobile, Alabama	Inactive	
		University of North Carolina Wilmington	Wilmington, North Carolina	Inactive	
		University of Rhode Island	Kingston, Rhode Island	Inactive	
		University of Scranton	Scranton, Pennsylvania	Inactive	
		University of South Carolina Upstate	Spartanburg, South Carolina	Inactive	
		University of Utah	Salt Lake City, Utah	Inactive	
		University of West Florida	Pensacola, Florida	Inactive	
		University of Wisconsin–Green Bay	Green Bay, Wisconsin	Inactive	
		University of Wisconsin–Oshkosh	Oshkosh, Wisconsin	Inactive	
		University of Wisconsin–Parkside	Somers, Wisconsin	Inactive	
		Urbana University	Urbana, Ohio	Inactive	(Note: The university closed in 2020.)
		Ursinus College	Collegeville, Pennsylvania	Inactive	
		Utica College	Utica, New York	Inactive	
		Valparaiso University	Valparaiso, Indiana	Inactive	
		Virginia Intermont College	Bristol, Virginia	Inactive	(Note: The college closed in 2014.)
		Virginia Wesleyan College	Norfolk, Virginia	Inactive	
		Voorhees College	Denmark, South Carolina	Inactive	
		Washington State University	Pullman, Washington	Inactive	
		Wayne State College	Wayne, Nebraska	Inactive	
		Muhlenberg College Wescoe School of Continuing Studies	Allentown, Pennsylvania	Inactive	
		Western Connecticut State University	Danbury, Connecticut	Inactive	
		Western Illinois University	Macomb, Illinois	Inactive	
		Widener University	Chester, Pennsylvania	Inactive	
		William Penn University College for Working Adults	West Des Moines, Iowa	Inactive	
		Winston-Salem State University	Winston-Salem, North Carolina	Inactive	
		Woodbury University	Burbank, California	Inactive	
		York College of Pennsylvania	Spring Garden Township, Pennsylvania.	Inactive	
