= College of Professional Advancement, University of Arizona Global Campus =

American online business school

Coordinates: 32°49′38″N 117°8′31″W

College of Professional Advancement
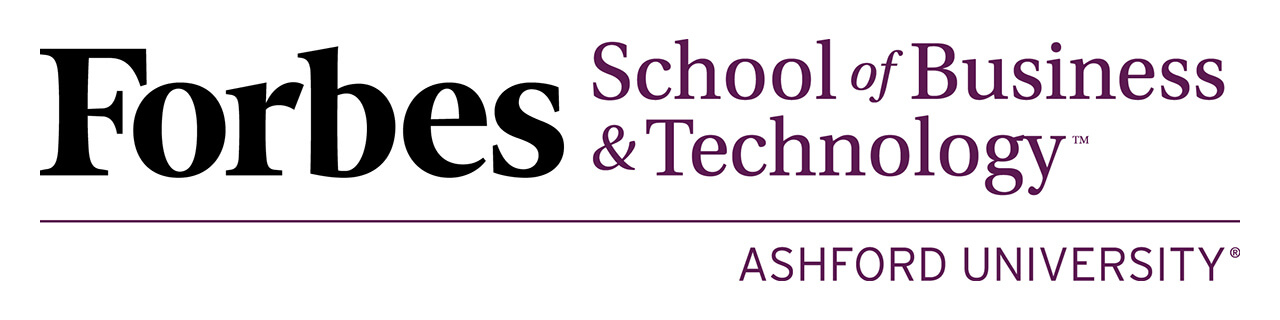
- Former names: Ashford College of Business & Professional Studies; Forbes School of Business
- Motto: Become Tomorrow’s Leader
- Type: Private, For-profit
- Established: 2013
- Parent institution: The University of Arizona Global Campus
- Officer in charge: Bob Daugherty
- Provost: Craig Swenson
- Students: 6,367 (2015)
- Location: 8620 Spectrum Center Blvd., San Diego, California, U.S.
- Campus: Online
- Language: English
- Colors: Purple & black
- Mascot: Forbes
- Website: www.uagc.edu/forbes-school-of-business-and-technology

The College of Professional Advancement, previously the Forbes School of Business and Technology, is an online school within the University of Arizona Global Campus. It offers degree programs at bachelor's and master's levels in business administration and information technology.

== History ==
The Forbes School of Business, originally created by Michael K. Clifford, was formed in 2013 after Ashford University announced an alliance with Forbes Media. Under the terms of the alliance, Ashford's College of Business & Professional studies was renamed as the Forbes School of Business. Students of the college gained free premium access to Forbes online content and Ashford's Distinguished Lecturer Series, where Steve Forbes and MBA Program Chair Diane Hamilton made frequent appearances. The school, since its inception, had a goal towards "retaining the strong brand recognition that comes with the Forbes name, while maintaining a clear and direct connection under Ashford University." The school has never received official endorsements from Forbes directly.

In 2016, the school changed its name from the Forbes School of Business to the Forbes School of Business & Technology, offering internet technology degrees. A year later, the Forbes School of Business & Technology received a special accreditation from the International Accreditation Council for Business Education (IACBE) to offer accounting degrees. The same year, the Forbes School of Business & Technology would name the biomedical company Nano LiquiTec as having the "Best Business Idea [for] 2017."

The Forbes School of Business & Technology announced in April 2019 that it would offer new Bachelor's programs in cyber security and mobile app technology. These technology degree programs are the only Bachelor and Master of Science offerings in the entire school. To date, the school offers 31 degree programs.

In late 2019, the school announced that the book Cracking the Curiosity Code, written by former MBA Program Chair Diane Hamilton, would be adopted across the school's Master of Human Resources (MAHR) curriculum. Hamilton's assessment called the 'Curiosity Code Index' was also implemented in the MAHR curriculum, which measured traits which impacted curiosity. Katy Thiry, the school's HR Program Chair justified the implementations, writing "Dr. Hamilton's work can add value to students by supporting the development of marketable skills which lead to long-term career success." FBST Curriculum Developer Chitra Anand also made her book, The Greenhouse Approach: Cultivating Intrapreneurship in Companies and Organizations, required reading throughout the school's MBA program.

== Board of Advisors ==
Steve Forbes, Roya Mahboob, Rich Karlgaard, Samantha Ettus, Margie Warrell, John Tamny, Bruce Rogers, Ray Powers, Laura Palmer-Noone, Robert Daugherty, Jayne Johnson and Olin Oedekoven are members of the Board of Advisors for the Forbes School of Business.

== Student organizations and honor societies ==
The Forbes School of Business & Technology has various student organizations. Among them are:

- Forbes School of Business & Technology Association for Computing Machinery (ACM)
- Forbes School of Business & Technology Business Management Club
- Forbes School of Business & Technology Marketing Club
- Forbes School of Business & Technology Project Management Club
- Forbes School of Business & Technology Society For Human Resource Management Chapter
- Forbes School of Business & Technology Women Leaders
- Innovative and Creative Business Entrepreneurs and Leaders (ICBEL)

Honors students of the school are also eligible for entry into:

- Alpha Sigma Lambda
- Sigma Beta Delta
- Golden Key International
- Delta Alpha Pi
