= Full stack =

Full stack, full-stack or fullstack may refer to:

- Full stack, a player positioning strategy in the sport of pickleball
- Fullstack Academy, a software engineering bootcamp
- Full-stack developer, a software developer able to work at all levels of the program stack
- Front end and back end software development packaged together as a single solution is referred to as a "full stack" solution
