= List of Society of Professional Journalists chapters =

The Society of Professional Journalists (SPJ) is the oldest organization representing journalists in the United States. SPJ was established in 1909 as a men's professional fraternity named Sigma Delta Chi at DePauw University in Greencastle, Indiana. The organization continued to function as a fraternity until 1960, when it became a professional society for journalists. In 1973, the society changed its name to Society of Professional Journalists, Sigma Delta Chi. In 1988, the present Society of Professional Journalists name was adopted. The society has both professional and student chapters.

== Student chapters ==
Following are the student chapters of the Society of Professional Journalists, with inactive chapters indicated in italics.

Charter date and range	Institution	Location	Status	Ref.
April 17, 1909	DePauw University	Greencastle, Indiana	Active	
1910	University of Kansas	Lawrence, Kansas	Inactive	
1910	University of Michigan	Ann Arbor, Michigan	Inactive	
1910–1924	University of Denver	Denver, Colorado	Inactive	
1910–1922	University of Virginia	Charlottesville, Virginia	Inactive	
1911	University of Washington	Seattle, Washington	Active	
1911	Purdue University	West Lafayette, Indiana	Inactive	
1911	Ohio State University	Columbus, Ohio	Inactive	
1911	University of Wisconsin–Madison	Madison, Wisconsin	Inactive	
1912	University of Iowa	Iowa City, Iowa	Inactive	
1912	University of Illinois Urbana-Champaign	Champaign, Illinois	Active	
1912–1914; 19xx ?–1929	University of Pennsylvania	Philadelphia, Pennsylvania	Inactive	
1913	University of Missouri	Columbia, Missouri	Inactive	
1913	University of Texas at Austin	Austin, Texas	Inactive	
1913	University of Oregon	Eugene, Oregon	Inactive	
1913	University of Oklahoma	Norman, Oklahoma	Inactive	
1914	Indiana University Bloomington	Bloomington, Indiana	Active	
1914	University of Nebraska–Lincoln	Lincoln, Nebraska	Inactive	
1914	Iowa State University	Ames, Iowa	Inactive	
1915	Stanford University	Stanford, California	Inactive	
1915	Louisiana State University	Baton Rouge, Louisiana	Active	
1915	University of Montana	Missoula, Montana	Inactive	
1915	Kansas State University	Manhattan, Kansas	Inactive	
1915–1924	University of Maine	Orono, Maine	Inactive	
1915–1917	University of Chicago	Chicago, Illinois	Inactive	
1915–1926	Beloit College	Beloit, Wisconsin	Inactive	
1916	University of Minnesota	Minneapolis, Minnesota	Active	
1916–1924, 19xx ?	Miami University	Oxford, Ohio	Inactive	
1917–1927	Knox College	Galesburg, Illinois	Active	
1917–1933	Western Reserve University	Cleveland, Ohio	Inactive	
1919	Grinnell College	Grinnell, Iowa	Inactive	
1920–1935	University of Pittsburgh	Pittsburgh, Pennsylvania	Inactive	
1920–1925	Columbia University	New York City, New York	Inactive	
1920	University of Colorado Boulder	Boulder, Colorado	Active	
1920	Cornell University	Ithaca, New York	Inactive	
1920–1922, 1958	University of North Carolina at Chapel Hill	Chapel Hill, North Carolina	Inactive	
1921	Oregon State University	Corvallis, Oregon	Inactive	
1921	Marquette University	Milwaukee, Wisconsin	Inactive	
1922	University of North Dakota	Grand Forks, North Dakota	Inactive	
1922	Northwestern University	Evanston, Illinois	Inactive	
1923–1929	University of Toronto	Toronto, Ontario, Canada	Inactive	
1924	Washington State University	Pullman, Washington	Inactive	
1925	Drake University	Des Moines, Iowa	Inactive	
1925–1933, 1943	University of California, Berkeley	Berkeley, California	Inactive	
1926	Butler University	Indianapolis, Indiana	Inactive	
1926–1932	University of South Dakota	Vermillion, South Dakota	Inactive	
1926	Syracuse University	Syracuse, New York	Active	
1926–1936, 1956	University of Kentucky	Lexington, Kentucky	Active	
1927	University of Georgia	Athens, Georgia	Active	
1928	Washington and Lee University	Lexington, Virginia	Active	
1928–1935, 1960	University of South Carolina	Columbia, South Carolina	Inactive	
1928	University of Florida	Gainesville, Florida	Inactive	
1929–1931, 1946	Baylor University	Waco, Texas	Inactive	
1930	Temple University	Philadelphia, Pennsylvania	Inactive	
1931	Southern Methodist University	Dallas, Texas	Inactive	
1932	Ohio University	Athens, Ohio	Active	
1932	Pennsylvania State University	University Park, Pennsylvania	Active	
1934	University of Southern California	Los Angeles, California	Inactive	
1937	South Dakota State University	Brookings, South Dakota	Inactive	
1940	Michigan State University	East Lansing, Michigan	Inactive	
1941	Emory University	Atlanta, Georgia	Inactive	
1946	Oklahoma State University	Stillwater, Oklahoma	Inactive	
1947	Boston University	Boston, Massachusetts	Active	
1947	University of Miami	Coral Gables, Florida	Inactive	
1947	University of Nevada, Reno	Reno, Nevada	Inactive	
1948	University of Alabama	Tuscaloosa, Alabama	Active	
1948	University of Idaho	Moscow, Idaho	Inactive	
1949	University of Houston	Houston, Texas	Inactive	
1949	University of New Mexico	Albuquerque, New Mexico	Inactive	
1952	Wayne State University	Detroit, Michigan	Inactive	
1952	Kent State University	Kent, Ohio	Inactive	
1952	American University	Washington, D.C.	Inactive	
1954	North Texas State University	Denton, Texas	Inactive	
1954	San Jose State University	San Jose, California	Inactive	
1954	University of California, Los Angeles	Los Angeles, California	Inactive	
1954	Texas A&M University	College Station, Texas	Inactive	
1954	University of Utah	Salt Lake City, Utah	Inactive	
1956	University of Maryland, College Park	College Park, Maryland	Active	
1956	Southern Illinois University Carbondale	Carbondale, Illinois	Inactive	
1956	University of Tennessee	Knoxville, Tennessee	Active	
1957	San Diego State University	San Diego, California	Active	
1958	Bradley University	Peoria, Illinois	Inactive	
1958	Duquesne University	Pittsburgh, Pennsylvania	Inactive	
1958	Sam Houston State University	Huntsville, Texas	Active	
1958	Texas Tech University	Lubbock, Texas	Inactive	
1959	Brigham Young University	Provo, Utah	Active	
1959	West Virginia University	Morgantown, West Virginia	Inactive	
1960	Arizona State University	Tempe, Arizona	Inactive	
1960	University of Tulsa	Tulsa, Oklahoma	Inactive	
1960	Texas Christian University	Fort Worth, Texas	Inactive	
1961	East Texas State University	Commerce, Texas	Inactive	
1961	University of Wyoming	Laramie, Wyoming	Inactive	
	Arkansas Tech University	Russellville, Arkansas	Active	
	Ashford University	Chandler, Arizona	Inactive	(Note: The University of Arizona acquired Ashford University in 2023, making it the University of Arizona Global Campus.)
	Augusta University	Augusta, Georgia	Active	
	Bowling Green State University	Bowling Green, Ohio	Active	
	California State Polytechnic University, Pomona	Pomona, California	Active	
	California State University, Northridge	Los Angeles, California	Active	
	California State University, Sacramento	Sacramento, California	Active	
	Central Connecticut State University	New Britain, Connecticut	Active	
	Central Michigan University	Mount Pleasant, Michigan	Active	
	Cleveland State University	Cleveland, Ohio	Active	
	Colorado Mesa University	Grand Junction, Colorado	Active	
	Colorado State University	Fort Collins, Colorado	Active	
	DePaul University	Chicago, Illinois	Active	
	Elon University	Elon, North Carolina	Active	
	Emerson College	Boston, Massachusetts	Active	
	Florida A&M University	Tallahassee, Florida	Active	
	Georgetown University	Washington, D.C.	Active	
	Jacksonville State University	Jacksonville, Alabama	Active	
	John Carroll University	University Heights, Ohio	Active	
	Harding University	Searcy, Arkansas	Active	
	High Point University	High Point, North Carolina	Active	
	Hofstra University	Hempstead, New York	Active	
	Ithaca College	Ithaca, New York	Active	
	Kennesaw State University	Kennesaw, Georgia	Active	
	Lehigh University	Bethlehem, Pennsylvania	Active	
	Lipscomb University	Nashville, Tennessee	Active	
	Loyola University Chicago	Chicago, Illinois	Active	
	Northeastern Illinois University	Chicago, Illinois	Active	
	Northern Kentucky University	Highland Heights, Kentucky	Active	
	Northwestern State University	Natchitoches, Louisiana	Active	
	Pacific Lutheran University	Parkland, Washington	Active	
	Roger Williams University	Bristol, Rhode Island	Active	
	Southern Connecticut State University	New Haven, Connecticut	Active	
	State University of New York at Brockport	Brockport, New York	Active	
	Stony Brook University	Stony Brook, New York	Active	
	Tarleton State University	Stephenville, Texas	Active	
	Texas State University	San Marcos, Texas	Active	
	Tulsa Community College	Tulsa, Oklahoma	Active	
	University of Arkansas	Fayetteville, Arkansas	Active	
	University of Arkansas at Little Rock	Little Rock, Arkansas	Active	
	University of Central Florida	Orlando, Florida	Active	
	University of Connecticut	Storrs, Connecticut	Active	
	University of Dayton	Dayton, Ohio	Active	
	University of Hawaiʻi at Mānoa	Honolulu, Hawaii	Active	
	University of La Verne	La Verne, California	Active	
	University of Louisiana at Lafayette	Lafayette, Louisiana	Active	
	University of Memphis	Memphis, Tennessee	Active	
	University of Texas at Arlington	Arlington, Texas	Active	
	University of Wisconsin–Eau Claire	Eau Claire, Wisconsin	Active	
	Virginia Tech	Blacksburg, Virginia	Active	
	Western Carolina University	Cullowhee, North Carolina	Active	
	Western Washington University	Bellingham, Washington	Active	
	William Paterson University	Wayne, New Jersey	Active	

== Professional chapters ==
Following are the professional chapters of the Society of Professional Journalists, with active chapters indicated in bold and inactive chapters in italics.

Chapter	Charter date and range	Location	Status	Ref.
**Detroit Pro Chapter**	1921	Detroit, Michigan	Active	
Milwaukee Pro Chapter	1921	Milwaukee, Wisconsin	Inactive	
**Chicago Headline Club**	November 21, 1921	Chicago, Illinois	Active	
Austin Pro Chapter	1925	Austin, Texas	Inactive	
**New York Deadline Club**	1925	New York City, New York	Active	
**Northern California Pro Chapter**	1931	San Francisco, California	Active	
**St. Louis Pro Chapter**	1932	St. Louis, Missouri	Active	
**Greater Los Angeles Pro Chapter**	1934	Los Angeles, California	Active	
Dallas Pro Chapter	1935	Dallas, Texas	Inactive	
**Washington D.C. Pro Chapter**	1936	Washington, D.C. and Virginia	Active	
Atlanta Pro Chapter	1937	Atlanta, Georgia	Inactive	
Central Illinois Pro Chapter	1941	Champaign and Urbana, Illinois	Inactive	
**Florida Pro Chapter**	1946	Florida	Active	(Note: Chapter formed as the Greater Miami Pro Chapter. It expanded to include central Florida in the 1960s. Its name changed in 2013 when it expanded to include the entire state of Florida.)
**Fort Worth Pro Chapter**	1946	Fort Worth, Texas	Active	
**Hawaii Pro Chapter**	1947	Honolulu, Hawaii	Active	
Kansas City Pro Chapter	1947	Kansas City, Missouri	Inactive	
Nebraska Pro Chapter	1947	Lincoln, Nebraska	Inactive	
**New England Pro Chapter**	1947	Boston, Massachusetts	Active	(Note: This chapter covers Massachusetts, New Hampshire, Rhode Island, and Vermont.)
North Dakota Pro Chapter	1947	Grand Forks, North Dakota	Inactive	
Portland Pro Chapter	1947	Portland, Oregon	Inactive	
**Houston Pro Chapter**	1949	Houston, Texas	Active	(Note: Chapter originally called Texas Gulf Coast Pro Chapter.)
North Florida Pro Chapter	1949	Gainesville, Florida	Inactive	
**Colorado Pro Chapter**	October 13, 1949	Denver, Colorado	Active	
Central Michigan Pro Chapter	1950	Lansing, Michigan	Inactive	
**Cleveland Pro Chapter**	1950	Cleveland, Ohio	Active	
Illinois Valley Pro Chapter	1950	Peoria, Illinois	Inactive	
**Central Ohio Pro Chapter**	April 25, 1950	Columbus, Ohio	Active	
Florida West Coast Pro Chapter	1951	Tampa, Florida	Inactive	
**San Diego Pro Chapter**	1951	San Diego, California	Active	
Northwestern Ohio Pro Chapter	1952	Toledo, Ohio	Inactive	
**Utah Headliners**	1952	Salt Lake City, Utah	Active	
Mid-Missouri Pro Chapter	1953	Mexico, Missouri	Inactive	
New Mexico Pro Chapter	1953	Albuquerque, New Mexico	Inactive	
**Oklahoma Pro Chapter**	1953	Stillwater, Oklahoma	Active	
**Louisville Pro Chapter**	February 6, 1953	Louisville, Kentucky	Active	
Akron Pro Chapter	1954	Akron, Ohio	Inactive	
Central Pennsylvania Pro Chapter	1954	Harrisburg and Lancaster, Pennsylvania	Inactive	
Southern Illinois Pro Chapter	1954	Sparta and Carbondale, Illinois	Inactive	
Jackson Pro Chapter	1955	Jackson, Mississippi	Inactive	
Nevada Pro Chapter	1955	Rulo, Nebraska	Inactive	
**Pittsburgh Pro Chapter**	1955	Pittsburgh, Pennsylvania	Active	(Note: Chapter formed as the Tri-State Pro Chapter.)
**San Antonio Pro Chapter**	1955	San Antonio, Texas	Active	
**Indiana Pro Chapter**	1956	Indianapolis, Indiana	Active	
**Minnesota Pro Chapter**	1956	Minneapolis and Saint Paul, Minnesota	Active	
**Alabama Pro Chapter**	1958	Birmingham, Alabama	Active	
Richmond Pro Chapter	1958	Richmond, Virginia	Inactive	
**Valley of the Sun Pro Chapter**	1958	Phoenix, Arizona	Active	
West Texas Pro Chapter	1958	Lubbock, Texas	Inactive	
**Connecticut Pro Chapter**	1966	Connecticut	Active	
**Cincinnati Pro Chapter**	1967	Cincinnati, Ohio	Active	
**Press Club of Long Island**	1974	Long Island, New York	Active	
**Georgia Pro Chapter**	2014	Georgia	Active	
**Arkansas Pro Chapter**		Arkansas	Active	
**Bluegrass Pro Chapter**		Kentucky	Active	
**East Tennessee Pro Chapter**		Tennessee	Active	
**Guam Pro Chapter**		Guam	Active	
**Inland Northwest Pro Chapter**		Washington	Active	
**Kazakhstan Pro**		Kazakhstan	Active	
**Keystone State Pro**		Pennsylvania	Active	(Note: This chapter covers the majority of Pennsylvania.)
**Las Vegas Pro Chapter**		Las Vegas, Nevada	Active	
**Louisiana Pro Chapter**		Louisiana	Active	
**Maine Pro Chapter**		Maine	Active	
**Marianas Pro Chapter**		Northern Mariana Islands	Active	
**Maryland Pro Chapter**		Maryland and Washington, D.C.	Active	
**New Jersey Pro Chapter**		New Jersey	Active	
**North Carolina Pro Chapter**		North Carolina	Active	
**Northwest Arkansas Pro Chapter**		Arkansas	Active	
**Rio Grande Pro Chapter**		New Mexico and West Texas	Active	
**Virginia Pro Chapter**		Virginia	Active	
**Western Washington Pro Chapter**		Washington	Active	
**Wyoming Pro Chapter**		Wyoming	Active	
