= Zovio =

Education technology services company

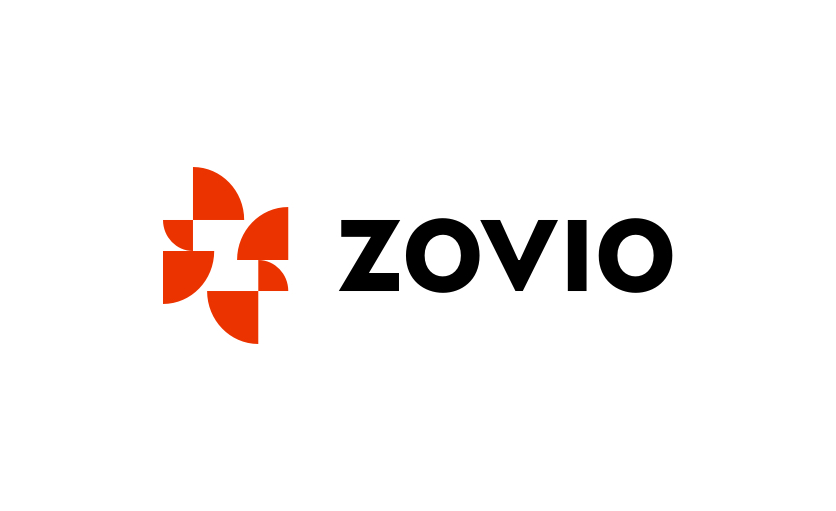
- Formerly: Bridgepoint Education
- Type: Public
- Traded as: Nasdaq: ZVO; Russell Microcap Index component
- Industry: Educational technology Higher Education
- Founded: 2004
- Headquarters: Chandler, AZ, US
- Revenue: ▼US$263 million (2021)
- Net income: ▲US$-42 million (2021)
- Total assets: ▼US$161 million (2021)
- Number of employees: Faculty: 100 full-time, 2,590 adjunct 1,730 non-faculty staff
- Subsidiaries: Fullstack Academy
- Website: zovio.com

Zovio, formerly Bridgepoint Education, Inc. (BPI), was a publicly held, American for-profit education services company. It was the online program manager for one online university, the University of Arizona Global Campus (formerly Ashford University), until the contract termination was announced August 1, 2022. In April 2019, the company changed its name to Zovio, moving its headquarters to Chandler, Arizona. In 2020, the company sold Ashford University to the University of Arizona. Zovio also owned Waypoint Outcomes and Fullstack Academy and traded on NASDAQ under the ticket symbol ZVO.

== History ==
=== Founding (1999) ===
Zovio was first incorporated in Delaware in May 1999 under the name TeleUniversity, Inc. The company changed its name to Bridgepoint Education, Inc. in February 2004.

=== Bridgepoint Education (2004–2019) ===
Bridgepoint Education purchased The Franciscan University of the Prairies in Clinton, Iowa in 2005 and changed its name to Ashford University. In September 2007 Bridgepoint purchased the Colorado School of Professional Psychology, and changed that institution's name to University of the Rockies. In 2008, Bridgepoint Education was named the fastest-growing private education company in the United States, as well as the fastest-growing private company in San Diego by Inc. magazine. In April 2009, Bridgepoint Education went public, and began trading on the New York Stock Exchange under the ticker symbol BPI. Bridgepoint's Ashford University had an estimated economic impact on state of Iowa of $40.9 million in business output, 782 jobs, $12.6 million in employee earnings, and $18.6 million in total value added to the state's GDP.

From 2010 through 2013, Bridgepoint Education was the title sponsor of the Holiday Bowl postseason college football game in San Diego. In 2013, Bridgepoint Education helped generate over $1 billion in income and 4,505 outside jobs in San Diego. In 2013, Bridgepoint Education's Ashford University announced an alliance with business publisher Forbes Media. Under the terms of the alliance, Ashford's College of Business and Professional Studies was renamed the Forbes School of Business at Ashford University.

On December 22, 2015, an agreement was made that Clinton Catalyst, LLC would buy the Ashford University campus properties for $1.6 million, according to the Clinton Herald. For the subsequent 12 months, Ashford University planned to lease the campus from Clinton Catalyst to make sure that the spring semester classes could continue, according to the Clinton Herald's report. In March 2017, Secretary of Education Betsy DeVos appointed Robert Eitel, a vice president at Bridgepoint, as an advisor. At the end of 2018, its last full year of operation under the Bridgepoint name, Bridgepoint enrollment stood at 38,153. On March 12, 2019, Bridgepoint Education reported to the Securities and Exchange Commission (SEC) that it had made unreliable statements about its earnings and losses. The company estimated an operating loss of $13.6–14.0 million loss for the quarter ending in December 2018. The same day, Bridgepoint announced the acquisition of the coding boot camp Fullstack Academy for approximately US$20 million.

Charitable organizations and programs Bridgepoint partnered with included After-School All-Stars, Big Brothers Big Sisters of San Diego, Boys & Girls Clubs of Greater San Diego, Computers 2 SD Kids, the Homefront Heroes Scholarship Program, the Jacobs & Cushman San Diego Food Bank, Junior Achievement, Make-A-Wish Foundation, A Salute to Teachers, the San Diego Office of Education, the Teacher Appreciation Scholarship Program, United Way of San Diego, and Warrior Foundation-Freedom Station. The Bridgepoint Heroes program brought Bridgepoint employees together for large-scale volunteer efforts. Past Bridgepoint Heroes initiatives included cleaning Chollas Lake Park, cleaning Balboa Park, cleaning the San Diego River Garden, revitalizing the Mary Fay Pendleton School on Marine Corps Base, Camp Pendleton, and restoring Ruffin Canyon.

=== Zovio (2019–2022) ===
In April 2019, Bridgepoint changed its name to Zovio and moved its stock listing to the NASDAQ, where it trades under the ticker symbol ZVO. On April 4, 2019, Zovio acquired on-demand tutoring provider TutorMe. In August 2020, the company announced that it would sell Ashford University to the University of Arizona. The company reported an annual loss of $61 million for 2020.

In 2021, co-founder and CEO Andrew Clark left Zovio and two new board members were appointed, John Silvanus Wilson, Jr., former Morehouse College President, and Ron Huberman, former superintendent of Chicago's public schools. Zovio continued to lose more money as enrollment at the newly branded University of Arizona Global Campus declined. Zovio agreed to pay the Massachusetts Attorney General $295,120 and to stop collecting written off balances owed to Ashford University by students both enrolled in Ashford and Massachusetts residents from 2011 to 2014. In November 2021, the California Attorney General case filed in 2017 against Ashford University began its trial phase. California Judge Eddie C. Sturgeon found for the plaintiffs on March 3, 2022, his 49-page opinion citing evidence that Zovio deceived students about their ability to become teachers, nurses, social workers, drug and alcohol counselors using their degrees; and misled students about how much financial aid they would receive; misrepresented federal financial aid rules, understated costs of attendance, the time needed to complete degree requirements, their ability to transfer credits, and evidence of deception within the admissions department, and Zovio's tolerance for repeat compliance offenders. Zovio was fined $22,375,282. The Board of Directors officially closed the business on September 11, 2022. Following the liquidation, Zovio plans to sell Fullstack Academy for an amount estimated between $34 and $55 million, according to the mentioned filing to the SEC. Stockholders would receive only a portion of it, probably below $20 million. It sold its final asset in November 2022 before closing down.

== Leadership ==
On December 1, 2021, Zovio announced Randy Hendricks as its new CEO.

== Philanthropy ==
Zovio directed its philanthropic efforts toward three aims: education, youth, and the military. The company said in 2021 that it had donated $11 million since 2005 through workplace giving campaigns.

== Lawsuits, investigations, and controversies ==
Bridgepoint Education faced and settled several lawsuits, including state-level lawsuits and federal investigations. It has been investigated in New York, North Carolina, California, and Massachusetts. A U.S. Department of Education Office of Inspector General probe is ongoing. On December 3, 2014, a lawsuit was filed in Arizona federal court charging that Bridgepoint Education was violating the Telephone Consumer Protection Act by robocalling for purposes of sales.

In 2008, the U.S. Department of Education's Office of Inspector General (OIG) audit services division performed a compliance audit of Ashford University for the period March 10, 2005, through June 30, 2009. The OIG audit reached the following conclusions:

Audit focus	Audit result
Compensation policies and practices relating to enrollment advisers	Rewarded recruiters based on their success in securing enrollments
Calculation, timeliness, and disbursement accuracy of Title IV program funds	Improperly retained at least $1.1 million during the 2006–07 period and disbursed aid before students were eligible to receive the money
Student Authorizations to retain credit balances	Kept credit balances without the proper authorization
Maintenance of supporting documentation for a student's leave of absence	Took too long to return money awarded to students who withdrew or went on leave of absence

The stock of Bridgepoint Education fell the most in almost five months when the misuse of federal student aid was first publicly disclosed in 2009. When the official results were released in 2011, Senator Tom Harkin said this audit "reveals the same troubling pattern of for-profit colleges' taking advantage of students and taxpayers." The Department of Education has not yet responded to the findings.

=== 2011 Senate hearings ===
On March 10, 2011, Senator Tom Harkin (D-Iowa) chaired a hearing of the Health, Education, Labor, and Pensions Committee that examined a "case study" of Bridgepoint Education, Inc., which has experienced near-exponential profit growth in the last few years despite low graduation rates. Bridgepoint owns two universities that it purchased when both were near bankruptcy, Ashford University in Iowa and the University of the Rockies in Colorado. When it purchased Ashford University in 2005, Bridgepoint grew from less than 300 students to more than 78,000 students at its peak, 99% of which were online.

Senator Harkin took issue with the fact that despite such growth, student success was lacking. According to information provided by Senator Harkin, 63% of students enrolled at Ashford University during the 2008–2009 school year withdrew before completion of their programs. Senator Harkin noted that Bridgepoint recorded $216 million in profits in 2010—of which 86.5% of its revenues came from federal funds. In reference to these figures, Senator Harkin was on record as saying, "In the world of for-profit higher education, spectacular business success is possible despite an equally spectacular record of student failure. Bridgepoint is a private company, but it is almost entirely dependent upon public funds ... I think this is a scam, an absolute scam."

Kathleen Tighe, Inspector General with the U.S. Department of Education, testified at the hearing that in an audit of Ashford, she discovered the university was improperly distributing federal financial aid to students. "Seventy-five percent of the improper disbursements to students in our sample were made to students who never became eligible," Tighe said. For the 2006–2007 award year during which the audit was performed, it is estimated Bridgepoint had not returned $1.1 million in improperly obtained student aid to the federal government. Tighe said on a recent report she had seen that Bridgepoint was "sitting on" $130 million in total credit balances.

Bridgepoint chose not to send executives to the HELP committee hearing while engaged in negotiations with Office of Federal Student Aid (FSA). Rather, Bridgepoint published a summary of responses called "Bridgepoint Education Transparency.

=== Additional lawsuits ===
In 2014, Bridgepoint Education settled a lawsuit with the State of Iowa for $7.25 million, denying any "wrongdoing but agreed to not use any 'unconscionable or coercive tactics' to encourage students to enroll."

On December 3, 2014, a lawsuit was filed in Arizona federal court charging that the company was violating the Telephone Consumer Protection Act by robocalling sales prospects.

In 2016, a former senior vice president at Ashford University alleged that Bridgepoint falsified its financial reports by inaccurately projecting the student retention rate.

In 2016, the Consumer Financial Protection Bureau took action against the company for "deceiving students into taking out private student loans that cost more than advertised". Bridgepoint paid a penalty of $8 million to the CFPB and forgave and refunded loans to students totaling $23.5 million.

In November 2017, the California Attorney General brought a lawsuit against Ashford University and its parent company Bridgepoint for engaging in "unlawful marketing, sales and debt collection practices". California Judge Eddie C. Sturgeon found for the plaintiffs on March 3, 2022, his 49-page opinion citing evidence that Zovio deceived students about their ability to become teachers, nurses, social workers, drug and alcohol counselors using their degrees; and misled students about how much financial aid they would receive; misrepresented federal financial aid rules, understated costs of attendance, the time needed to complete degree requirements, their ability to transfer credits, and evidence of deception within the admissions department, and Zovio's tolerance for repeat compliance offenders. Zovio was fined $22,375,282.

=== Closure of Ashford University campus ===
The December 2015, agreement with Clinton Catalyst, LLC by Bridgepoint Education to sell the Ashford University campus properties, in Clinton, Iowa, generated controversy in the higher education community. Critics questioned Bridgepoint's original commitment to the on-ground college, especially since it no longer needed a physical presence in the Midwest to keep its accreditation, and they accused Bridgepoint of having broken promises to maintain the campus. Bridgepoint officials had stated that they were committed to retaining the Clinton campus, and had tripled its Iowa enrollment from 2005 to 2011 through investments in facilities (about $40 million), scholarships, and other financial aid of about $10 million a year (subsidized with revenues from online students), as well as expansion of academic and athletics programs. Bridgepoint stated the company could not continue to subsidize the campus operation.

=== GI Bill controversies ===
Since becoming an online-only university in 2016, Ashford University's GI Bill eligibility has been through numerous changes, challenges, and controversies. Because initial approval for GI Bill enrollment is granted by the home state of the educational institution in question, when Ashford closed its Iowa campus in 2016, it was in danger of losing its GI Bill approval in the summer of 2017, and sought approval from the state of California, where Bridgepoint is based, but did not receive it.

Ashford University then leased an office in Phoenix, and gained GI Bill approval from Arizona in September 2017, but in November 2017 the U.S. Department of Veterans Affairs (VA) ruled that the Phoenix office did not qualify as a "main campus", since Bridgepoint is headquartered in California, and therefore the jurisdiction for approval would fall to California, not Arizona. On November 15, 2017, Bridgepoint suspended enrolling GI Bill students for Ashford University after a controversial exposé on the school appeared in the Chronicle of Higher Education. On November 17, 2017, Warburg Pincus, Bridgeport Education's major underwriter, announced its complete divestment from Bridgepoint. In late November 2017, the California Attorney General brought a lawsuit against Ashford University and Bridgepoint for engaging in unlawful marketing, sales, and debt collection practices.

In January 2018, the VA allowed Ashford to continue to receive GI Bill funding pending completion of the university's attempt to get approval from the much stricter state of California; California denied approval for the third time in December 2018. Reports by journalists, watchdogs, whistleblowers, and politicians alleged that Ashford University engages in misleading and predatory practices to enroll GI Bill students, particularly during the Trump administration and the Betsy DeVos-led education department deregulations. In February 2020, the VA superseded California's oversight and granted Ashford University approval to use GI Bill funding. The veterans' advocacy group Veterans Education Success strongly objected to the granting of GI Bill funding to Ashford, saying that the university "engage[s] in deceptive advertising [and] recruiting".
