= University of Arizona Global Campus =

Online university

The University of Arizona Global Campus
- Motto: Sursum
- Motto in English: Upwards
- Type: Public online university
- Established: 2023; 3 years ago
- Parent institution: Arizona Board of Regents
- Accreditation: WSCUC
- Academic affiliations: The University of Arizona
- President: Suresh Garimella
- Provost: Patricia A. Prelock
- Faculty: 118 full-time faculty and 1,801 part-time faculty
- Students: 34,190
- Undergraduates: 27,201
- Location: Tucson, Arizona, United States; 33.3017°N 111.8413°W
- Campus: Online
- Language: English
- Newspaper: The Daily Wildcat
- Colors: Cardinal and navy
- Nickname: Wildcats
- Mascot: Wilbur and Wilma T. Wildcat
- Website: uagc.edu

The University of Arizona Global Campus (formerly Ashford University) is a public online university affiliated with the University of Arizona. The university announced a deal to acquire Ashford University in 2020 and completed the deal in 2023.

It is an open enrollment institution serving working adults and offers associate, bachelor's, master's, and doctoral degrees in more than 50 degree programs online. The university consists of five colleges and is accredited by the WASC Senior College and University Commission.

== History ==
=== Mount St. Clare College/Franciscan University (of the Prairies) (1918–2005) ===
Seeing a need for higher education in Clinton County, Iowa, and the surrounding area, the Sisters of Saint Francis founded Mount St. Clare College in 1918. This liberal arts institution was also an approved teacher education college from 1932 to 1954. In 1942, 60 percent of the rural teachers in Clinton County and 62 percent of the teachers in the city of Clinton school system had received all their training from Mount St. Clare College. In 1950, the North Central Association of Colleges and Schools first accredited Mount St. Clare College. The college acquired a convent building, new library, new gymnasium, the Science Building, and Durham Residence Hall and became coeducational in 1967. The 24-acre (9.7 ha) campus was about a half mile from the Mississippi River and about a mile north of U.S. Route 30. The most notable building on campus was St. Clare Hall, which served as the Mount St. Clare Convent, Novitiate, Academy, and College. Durham and Regis Halls provided residence to on campus students. For the 1979–1980 school year, the college received approval for its first four-year degree, a bachelor's program in business administration. The same year, Mount St. Clare Academy merged with St. Mary's High School in Clinton, forming Mater Dei High School (now known as Prince of Peace Preparatory). With the space freed by the academy's merger, the school began to offer more four-year programs. In 1997, the sisters moved off campus into their new mother house, The Canticle. In 1998, the Durgin Educational Center was opened, which included new athletic facilities, including Kehl arena. In 2003, Mount St. Clare College changed its name to The Franciscan University. The university also offered its first master's degree online. In September 2004, the school modified its name to The Franciscan University of the Prairies in order to avoid confusion with similarly named schools.

=== Origin as TeleUniversity (1999–2001) ===
University of Arizona Global Campus claims a history dating back to 1918, the founding year of Mount St. Clare College. The school, however, has stronger roots with TeleUniversity, an online school created by entrepreneur Michael K. Clifford in 1999.

=== Charter Learning (2001–2003) ===
In 2001, the company changed leadership with co-founders Wayne Clugston, Scott Turner, and David Vande Pol. TeleUniversity was renamed Charter Learning with a focus on helping working adults complete their bachelor's degree while attending their community college. Charter Learning provided American Council on Education credit-recommended upper division curriculum in Organizational Management. The Maricopa Community College system provided the lower division coursework and instruction, and Charter Oak State College granted the degree. In 2003, Warburg Pincus, a private equity firm, invested in Charter Learning and the institution's name was changed to Bridgepoint Education. In 2005, Bridgepoint Education purchased the small Franciscan University of the Prairies campus in Clinton, Iowa, retained the school's valuable accreditation, and renamed it Ashford University. Most of Ashford University's students, however, were enrolled to learn exclusively online and the campus closed in May 2016.

=== Ashford University (2005–2020) ===
==== For-profit enrollment boom (2005–2012) ====
Charter Learning acquired the financially failing Catholic college to gain regional accreditation and access to federal funds. After the sale, the institution's name was changed to Ashford University. In 2010, Ashford University was highlighted in College, Inc., a PBS Frontline exposé about for-profit colleges. In June 2012, WASC denied initial accreditation to Ashford University. Following WASC's denial of accreditation for being, according to Insider Higher Ed, "lacking in several areas, including low numbers of full-time faculty, high student dropout rates and questions about academic rigor," WASC demanded additional information from Ashford prior to an October site visit. Its second application was accepted in 2013. In approving accreditation, the WASC Commission Action Letter stated "The Commission found that the University has responded to Commission concerns and judges that it is now in substantial compliance with Commission standards." The WASC visiting team noted in its final report that "the team found an institution that has been fundamentally transformed and whose culture has been changed in significant ways, including a shift from a market driven approach to an institution committed to student retention and success". At its meeting June 26–28, 2019, the WASC Senior College and University Commission acted to reaffirm Ashford's accreditation through Spring 2025.

Academic organizations included the Ashford Junior-Senior Honor Society, the Ashford Student Iowa State Education Association, the Golden Key International Honour Society, the Mu Sigma Eta math and science honor society, the Phi Beta Lambda business organization, the Psychology Club, the Scholars Institute honors program, and the Sigma Tau Delta literature and education honor society. Campus students were eligible for the Ashford Junior-Senior Honor Society, the Scholars Institute, Mu Sigma Eta math and science honor society, and Sigma Tau Delta literature and education honor society.

The Ashford athletic teams were called the Saints. The university was a member of the National Association of Intercollegiate Athletics (NAIA), primarily competing as an NAIA Independent within the Association of Independent Institutions (AII) from 2012–13 to 2015–16 (when the school closed). The Saints previously competed in the defunct Midwest Collegiate Conference (MCC) from 1988–89 to 2011–12.

Ashford competed in 17 intercollegiate varsity sports: Men's sports included baseball, basketball, bowling, cross country, golf, soccer, tennis, and track & field; while women's sports include basketball, bowling, cross country, golf, soccer, softball, tennis, track & field, and volleyball.

==== Enrollment declines (2013–2020) ====
View source data.

In 2013, Ashford University announced an alliance with Forbes Media, and Ashford's College of Business and Professional Studies was renamed the Forbes School of Business. It was later renamed Forbes School of Business & Technology at Ashford University. On July 9, 2015, the university announced that the Iowa campus would close in May 2016. The inability to meet campus enrollment requirements was a key factor in the Ashford University Board of Trustees' decision to call for the campus closure.

In 2017, Ashford University school faced the potential loss of GI Bill funding as enrollment decreased more than 50 percent from its peak in 2011. Bridgepoint Education merged Ashford with the University of the Rockies and planned to convert Ashford to a non-profit university. In 2018, the university took steps to become a nonprofit institution. According to Nolan Sundrud, a Bridgepoint spokesman, the nonprofit status would allow the university to be "...judged and measured as colleges and universities should be - on their ability to support student success." The switch required approval from both the Internal Revenue Service and the Department of Education. In November 2018, Ashford's accreditor, WASC, delayed allowing the school to become a non-profit.

In 2019, Bridgepoint bought Fullstack Academy, and moved its personnel to Chandler, Arizona, boasting that its facility would feature an open working environment, with a café, gym, and on-site health clinic. Bridgepoint then rebranded and changed its name to Zovio. On April 14, 2019, Ashford University was featured in an NBC News investigation of for-profit colleges that were targeting military veterans. In June 2019, Zovio announced a mass layoff at its headquarters in San Diego. A month later, WASC approved Ashford to become a non-profit entity. Zovio faces shareholder lawsuits related to factual misstatements and an informal inquiry by the Securities and Exchange Commission. One such suit was dismissed by the California Superior Court on July 8, 2019, and a subsequent appeal was later dismissed with prejudice.

In October 2019, Zovio received a letter from the U.S. Department of Education stating that it would be required to post an irrevocable letter of credit of 25 percent of the Title IV funding for fiscal year 2018 upon change of ownership. In February 2020, Zovio reported a net operating loss of $56.6 million in 2019. Enrollment declined from a peak of 77,734 in 2012 to 32,620 in 2019.

In March 2020, during the COVID-19 pandemic, Ashford's parent company announced that it would be hiring 200 additional enrollment advisors. In 2020, Ashford received $1 million in federal Covid relief funds.

=== University of Arizona Global Campus (2020–present) ===
==== Criticism of acquisition ====
In August 2020, faculty members of University of Arizona's Eller College of Management said the acquisition of Ashford University would "impair the value of the University of Arizona, expose the University of Arizona to litigation, impede our ability to compete in the high-quality online space, and harm relationships with current and prospective donors and faculty."

Gary Rhoades, professor at the Center for the Study of Higher Education at the University of Arizona and former general secretary of the American Association of University Professors said, "This is a sad example of public universities' 'cynical academic capitalism,' grounded in white privilege and the exploitation of 'others' who the public universities themselves have generally have largely underserved."

According to Dave Wells of the Grand Canyon Institute, "Ashford is considered a predatory institution with a history of students dropping out or transferring with huge amounts of debt." As part of the transfer of ownership, University of Arizona Global had a service agreement with Zovio. According to the agreement, Arizona Global "will pay to the Company services fees equal to the Company's direct costs to provide the services plus an additional amount equal to 19.5% of Global Campus's tuition and fees revenue". Zovio continued to lose more money as enrollment at the newly branded University of Arizona Global Campus declined. According to the Chronicle of Higher Education, "recent disclosures by Zovio also suggest enrollment struggles lie ahead for America's newest mega-university, at least in the short term."

==== Lawsuits and accreditation issues ====
In 2021, the university's parent company agreed to resolve an inquiry by the Massachusetts Attorney General's Office through an Assurance of Discontinuance regarding Ashford University students. More specifically, the company agreed to pay the Massachusetts Attorney General $295,120 and to stop collecting written off balances that former Ashford University students in Massachusetts owed to the school. The university also received $564,001 from the American Rescue Plan. In July, UAGC's accreditor, WASC, notified the school that it had "strong concerns that the targets set for academic improvement” at the school “are seriously inadequate to reach levels of student outcomes that should be expected at an accredited institution.”

In December 2021, a California trial against Ashford University and Bridgepoint Education was underway. The California Attorney General alleged that Ashford University and Zovio engaged in "unlawful business practices," providing "false and misleading information to students to persuade them to enroll in the school", and "illegal debt collection practices when students struggled to pay their bills."

In March 2022, WASC kept its notice of concern, noting the school's low retention and graduation rates.

=== Sale to the University of Arizona (2023) ===
In 2020, it was announced that Ashford University would be sold by Zovio (formerly Bridgepoint Education), a for-profit higher education technology services company, to University of Arizona.

Even though it did not finalize the acquisition and assume control of the institution, Ashford University was renamed the University of Arizona Global Campus. Zovio continued as the campus's online program manager until UAGC terminated its contract with Zovio in 2022. The acquisition was completed three years later.

On August 30, 2023, the Biden administration canceled $72 million of federal student loan debt for more than 2,300 borrowers who were enrolled at Ashford University in California between March 1, 2009, and April 30, 2020.

In 2023, University of Arizona faced a financial crisis, allegedly "losing track of more than $240 million through accounting errors and flawed financial projections." Subsequent investigative reporting by The Arizona Republic linked much of the crisis to the university's purchase of Ashford University, accusing university administrators of knowing that Ashford was experiencing "a downward enrollment spiral that began years before [the purchase] and dismal graduation and retention rates".

In 2024, the U.S. Department of Education discussed a claw back of funds related to borrower defense to repayment fraud claims against the school.

=== Integration into University of Arizona Online (2026) ===
In March 2026, the University of Arizona announced it would integrate UAGC directly into Arizona Online. This move transitions the institution from its previous status as a separate affiliated entity into a fully integrated component of the university's online education framework. This organizational shift followed the U.S. Department of Education's decision to drop a $72 million recoupment claim against the university related to student loan discharges from the institution's time as Ashford University.

== Leadership ==
The University of Arizona Global Campus, like its sister institutions Arizona State University and Northern Arizona University, is governed by the Arizona Board of Regents or the ABOR, a 12-member body. Eight volunteer members are appointed by the Governor to staggered eight-year terms; two students serve on the board for two-year appointments, with the first year being a nonvoting apprentice year. The Governor and the Superintendent of Public Instruction serve as voting ex-officio members. The ABOR provides "policy guidance" and oversight to the three major degree-granting universities, as provided for by Title 15 of the Arizona Revised Statutes.

Suresh Garimella was named the 23rd president of the U of A on August 9, 2024. Previously, he was the president of the University of Vermont from 2019 to 2024. Garimella has also previously served as the Executive Vice President for Research and Partnerships, a Chief Global Affairs Officer, and was recognized as a Goodson Distinguished Professor of Mechanical Engineering at Purdue University.

Garimella replaced Robert C. Robbins, MD. He was named as the lone finalist to succeed as president after Robbins announced his plans to step down at the end of his current contract, or before if a suitable successor was identified, during an ABOR meeting on April 2, 2024.

UAGC Senior Executive Leadership are:

- Dr. Suresh Garimella – President of the University of Arizona, University Distinguished Professor. He holds full executive oversight over UAGC operations and addresses its graduating classes.
- Dr. Patricia A. Prelock – Provost and Chief Academic Officer at the University of Arizona. She directly oversees all online initiatives, academic assessments, and student support services.
- Bettyjo H. Bouchey – Senior Vice Provost for Online Education at the University of Arizona. She leads the university's enterprise online strategy and the integration of Arizona Online and the University of Arizona Global Campus.
- Dr. Blake Alan Naughton – Vice Provost, Global Campus Academic Affairs. He leads the day-to-day academic strategy, faculty affairs, and learning operations specifically for UAGC
- Katie Scheie – Vice Provost, Global Campus Student Success.
- Christine Hardy – Vice President, Global Campus Enrollment Management.
- John P. Aldrich – Senior Vice President of Military and Academic Partnerships.
- Morgan Johnson – Vice President of Academic Innovation and Operations
- Dr. Teresa Kuruc – Vice President of Faculty Affairs
- Dr. Caleb Simmons – Vice Provost, Arizona Online

== Funding and student aid ==
The former Ashford University received approximately 95% of its money from the U.S. federal government, including $41 million from military tuition assistance and $26 million from GI Bill funds. Ashford University partnered with more than 100 companies to offer tuition discounts and a limited number of full-tuition grants. Partner companies included T-Mobile, Bridgestone, Hewlett-Packard, Zurich Insurance Group, and Comcast. More than 1,000 students used the full tuition grant to get a degree at Ashford.

== Academics ==
According to the National Center for Education Statistics, in 2022, Ashford University employed 122 full-time faculty and 1,680 part-time faculty. The university consists of five colleges: Forbes School of Business and Technology, College of Education, College of Health, Human Services, and Science, College of Liberal Arts, and Honors College.

== Student body ==
University of Arizona Global's undergraduate population is 43 percent white, 31 percent black, 16 percent Hispanic, 4 percent 2 or more races, and 2 percent Asian. Sixty-eight percent were eligible for Pell Grants. According to SEC reports, approximately 71 percent of the student body is female, and the average age is 35. In comparison, University of Arizona's undergraduate population is 50 percent white, 27 percent Hispanic, 7 percent non-resident alien, 5 percent Asian, and 4 percent black.

== Student outcomes ==
According to the U.S. Department of Education's College Scorecard, Ashford University has a 20 percent 8-year graduation rate. In comparison, the University of Arizona's 8-year graduation rate is 64 percent. The College Scorecard reported that of student debtors two years into repayment, 32 percent were in forbearance, 28 percent were not making progress, 13 percent defaulted, 12 percent were in deferment, 7 percent were delinquent, 5 percent were making progress, 2 percent were paid in full, and 2 percent were discharged.

== Rankings ==
Washington Monthly ranked Ashford University 588th of 616 master's degree schools in the US. In comparison, University of Arizona ranked 87th among national universities.

== Student life ==
University of Arizona Global Campus students have the opportunity to join several honor societies. Online students can join the Alpha Sigma Lambda and Phi Theta Kappa honor societies. Students are able to join Delta Alpha Pi International Honor Society, Golden Key International Honour Society, and SALUTE Veterans National Honor Society.

According to the US Department of Education College Navigator, 3,677 service members are using their Tuition Assistance (TA) benefits for Ashford. An additional 2,666 use their GI Bill benefits for the school.

== Lawsuits and controversies ==
=== Audits, investigations, and lawsuits (2006–2011) ===
According to U.S. Senate testimony by Arlie Willems, retired reviewer for the Iowa Department of Education, the Iowa Department of Education denied Ashford University's request in 2006 to offer an online Master of Arts in Teaching (MAT) on the grounds that the program "was more a collection of discrete courses than a cohesive program, was understaffed for appropriate interaction with students and supervision of both courses and clinical experiences, including student teaching. Many faculty members lacked appropriate academic background and/or experiences for their assigned responsibilities. The most serious concern noted by the team was the lack of responsibility on the part of the program in providing quality clinical experiences, the aspect of teacher preparation considered the most important by preparation programs in Iowa."

Willems also testified that Ashford entered into partnership with Rio Salado Community College whereby education courses from the Ashford BA in Social Science with a Concentration in Education could apply to Rio Salado's post-baccalaureate teacher education program. Once students have completed the online Ashford BA and the online Rio Salado teacher education program, they are eligible for an Arizona teaching license. Willems noted that this partnership could be seen as a creative way to solve a problem in order to continue drawing students, or it could be seen as a way to circumvent the accountability system for quality in order to continue collecting tuition from students. An individual who has attained an Arizona license in this way does not automatically receive an Iowa license because Iowa and Arizona do not have a reciprocity agreement.

According to Willems, complaints from Ashford students concerning this agreement and licensure include:

1. Individuals from Iowa and many other states had completed Ashford's online Bachelor of Arts in Social Science with a Concentration in Education. These individuals had been led to believe that, upon completion of this program, they would be eligible for a license in their home state because Ashford has a state-approved teacher education program (the on-ground undergraduate program).
2. Individuals were students or graduates of the Ashford online baccalaureate program, but were not aware of the need to complete the Rio Salado program as well in order to receive an Arizona license. These individuals were not even aware of the Rio Salado partnership.
3. Ashford students were intending to complete student teaching through Rio Salado College and believed they would then automatically be eligible for an Iowa teaching license.
4. Students were completing an online degree through Ashford in early childhood education believed that this degree would lead to an Iowa teaching license. It does not.

In May 2008, the U.S. Department of Education's Office of Inspector General (OIG) audit services division commenced a compliance audit of Ashford University covering the period March 10, 2005, through June 30, 2009. The OIG audit reached the following conclusions:

| Audit focus | Audit result |
|---|---|
| Compensation policies and practices relating to enrollment advisers | Rewarded recruiters based on their success in securing enrollments |
| Calculation, timeliness, and disbursement accuracy of Title IV program funds | Improperly retained at least $1.1 million during the 2006–2007 period |
| Student authorizations to retain credit balances | Kept credit balances without the proper authorization |
| Maintenance of supporting documentation for a student's leave of absence | Took too long to return money awarded to students who withdrew |

The stock of Ashford's parent company, Bridgepoint Education, fell the most in almost five months when the misuse of federal student aid was first publicly disclosed in 2009. When the official results were released in 2011, Senator Tom Harkin said this audit "reveals the same troubling pattern of for-profit colleges' taking advantage of students and taxpayers." The Department of Education has not yet responded to the findings.

The audit was the subject of a U.S. Senate committee hearing on March 10, 2011.

A Bloomberg News report revealed that Ashford was recruiting disabled soldiers at the Wounded Warrior Battalion at Camp Lejeune, North Carolina, including a Marine with a traumatic brain injury.

=== 2011 Iowa Attorney General investigation and US Senate hearings ===
According to a February 15, 2011 filing with the Securities and Exchange Commission, Ashford University and its parent company, Bridgepoint Education, received a letter from the Iowa Attorney General's office on February 9, 2011, requesting "documents and detailed information" from January 1, 2008, to the present to determine if Ashford's business practices possibly violated the state's Consumer Fraud Act.

On March 10, 2011, Senator Tom Harkin (D-Iowa) chaired a hearing of the Health, Education, Labor, and Pensions Committee that examined a case study of Ashford's parent company, which had experienced near-exponential profit growth in the last few years despite low graduation rates. Bridgepoint owns two universities that it purchased when both were near bankruptcy, Ashford University in Iowa and the University of the Rockies in Colorado. When it purchased Ashford University in 2005, it had fewer than 300 students but in 2010 it claimed to have over 78,000 students, 99% of which were online.

Harkin took issue with success of the company saying that while Bridgepoint may have had record profits the students were not succeeding. According to information provided by Harkin in the committee hearing, 63% of students who enrolled at Ashford University during the 2008–2009 school year withdrew before completion of their prospective program. Harkin pointed out that Bridgepoint recorded more than $216 million in profits in 2010; of which 86.5 percent of its revenues come from federal funds. In reference to the dependence of Bridgepoint on public funds, Harkin was quoted as saying, "I think this is a scam, an absolute scam."

Kathleen Tighe, an inspector general with the U.S. Department of Education, testified at the hearing that in an audit of Ashford, she discovered Ashford was improperly distributing student aid to students. "Seventy-five percent of the improper disbursements to students in our sample were made to students who never became eligible," Tighe said. Bridgepoint hadn't returned the improperly obtained student aid to the federal government, and said on a recent report she'd seen that Bridgepoint was "sitting on $130 million" in these types of funds.

Due to the ongoing Office of Federal Student Aid (FSA) proceedings, and in order to preserve due process, Ashford's parent company, Bridgepoint Education, chose not to send executives to the HELP committee hearing while engaged in negotiations with FSA. Rather, Bridgepoint published a summary of responses called Bridgepoint Education Transparency.

=== Audits, investigations, and lawsuits (2011–2021) ===
In 2011, Ashford was audited by the U.S. Department of Education for its recruiting and finance practices. Bridgepoint Education responded with a report asserting that the information in the Senate hearing was inaccurate or incomplete.

On December 3, 2014, a suit was filed in Arizona federal court charging that Bridgepoint Education was violating the Telephone Consumer Protection Act by robocalling sales prospects. Similar suits were filed in federal court in San Diego and the Northern District of Ohio.

In 2015, the Consumer Financial Protection Bureau reported that they were investigating Ashford University related to "unlawful acts or practices related to the advertising, marketing or origination of private student loans."

In 2016, Bridgepoint Education received a subpoena from the Securities and Exchange Commission related to the potential joint resolution of investigations by the California Attorney General and the Consumer Financial Protection Bureau. In 2016, a former senior vice president at Ashford University alleged that Bridgepoint falsified its financial reports by inaccurately projecting the student retention rate. On September 12, 2016, the Consumer Financial Protection Bureau fined Bridgepoint Education, the parent company of Ashford University, $31.5 million for deceiving students about the cost of private student loans; $23.5 million was targeted for relief and refunds to consumers. In 2016, the Iowa Department of Education notified Ashford that it would discontinue approval for GI Bill benefits after June 30.

In September 2017, the Department of Veterans Affairs accepted the shift in its state-based eligibility for veterans' benefits from Iowa to Arizona, but also stated in a letter that the VA has independent regulatory authority aside from the Arizona State Approving Agency. In September 2017, the VA gave Ashford approval to enroll GI Bill students indefinitely. Ashford University and its parent company Bridgepoint Education were the subject of an investigation published in The Chronicle of Higher Education. The article included information about Bridgepoint's political moves with Arizona politicians in order to maintain GI Bill funding. In November 2017, the California Attorney General brought a lawsuit against Ashford and its parent company Bridgepoint for engaging in "unlawful marketing, sales and debt collection practices".

In March 2019, Bridgepoint Education reported that it had made unreliable statements about its earnings and losses. The company estimated an operating loss of $13.6–14 million loss for the quarter ending in December 2018. Ashford University was featured in an NBC News Investigates piece that aired April 14, 2019. One recruiter, Eric Dean alleged that Ashford was targeting veterans with PTSD.

In November 2021, the California Attorney General case reached its trial phase. In March 2022, San Diego Superior Court issued that the parent company Zovio and its current rebranded online campus must pay $22 million in penalties for violating the laws by misleading students about career outcomes, college tuitions, financial aids, and degree programs. The court denied the company's request to compensate students.
