= University of the Rockies =

Defunct private university in Denver, Colorado

- Type: Graduate School of Psychology
- Established: 1998
- Founder: Emory G. Cowan, Jr
- Parent institution: Zovio
- President: Dawn Iwamoto
- Faculty: 386
- Students: 1365 (online and campus-based students
- Location: Denver, Colorado, United States; 38°49′58″N 104°48′52″W
- Website: Official website

University of the Rockies (now the University of Arizona Global Campus) was a private university in Denver, Colorado. It operated from 1998 to 2018 and offered graduate and postgraduate instruction in the social and behavioral sciences both online and at its Denver Instructional Site. The university's programs were organized into two schools: The School of Professional Psychology (SOPP) and the School of Organizational Leadership (SOL), offering masters and doctorate degrees as well as graduate level certificate programs. The university's parent organization, Zovio, is a for-profit higher education company based in San Diego, California.

== History ==
University of the Rockies was founded on June 18, 1998, as the Colorado School of Professional Psychology (COSPP) in Denver, Colorado. In 2007, Bridgepoint Education (now Zovio) purchased COSPP and changed the school's name to University of the Rockies. In 2012, the university opened a new location in downtown Denver, Colorado. The larger space included more room for on-site instruction and the university's accreditor, the Higher Learning Commission (HLC), granted approval for University of the Rockies to offer degree programs at the Denver Instructional Site in 2013. In 2015, HLC notified University of the Rockies that it would continue the university's accreditation, with the next Reaffirmation of Accreditation in 2024–2025. On October 29, 2018, the university officially closed its doors when it completed a merger with Bridgepoint Holdings other institution, Ashford University, and brought all of its educational programs under the Ashford University brand. The university is now the University of Arizona Global Campus as part of the acquisition of Ashford University by the University of Arizona.

== Academics ==
The university's programs were organized into two schools: The School of Professional Psychology (SOPP) and the School of Organizational Leadership (SOL), each offering masters and doctorate degrees as well as graduate level certificate programs. The university offers Master of Arts degree in Human Services, Organizational Development and Leadership, Psychology, Education, and Counseling. At the doctorate level, it offers the PsyD in Psychology, and in Psychology with a Clinical Specialization, as well as the PhD in education, Human Service, and Organizational Development and Leadership. It also offers four graduate level certificate programs in Business Psychology, Criminology and Justice Studies, General Psychology, and Organizational Leadership.

Students pursuing licensure as clinical psychologists enrolled in the PsyD, Clinical Specialization, which was only available on campus. This degree was tailored by concentrations in Clinical Neuropsychology, Forensic/Correctional Psychology, Health Psychology, Marriage and Family Therapy, or Sports Neuroperformance

=== Accreditation and licensure ===
The university was regionally accredited by the Higher Learning Commission (HLC). Initial accreditation was granted by the Higher Learning Commission in 2003. The university was also granted Category I status as a degree-granting institution by the Colorado Commission on Higher Education (CCHE). The university was an associate member of the National Council of Schools and Programs of Professional Psychology. Its doctoral program in Clinical Psychology was not accredited by the American Psychological Association and it was not registered with the Association of State and Provincial Psychology Boards. Accreditation with HLC ended and licensure transferred upon their merger with Ashford University which was accredited by the Western Association of Schools and Colleges.

== Campus ==
In 2012, the University of the Rockies opened a new location in downtown Denver, Colorado. The facility offers classroom space and a Student Resource Center for campus students. The university also operated the Rockies Counseling Center in the university's former location in Colorado Springs, Colorado. It was located within a historic red brick building that had served as a railroad depot; the Center closed in 2015.

== Student life ==
=== Honor societies ===
University of the Rockies students were eligible to participate in one of the university's academic honor societies, Golden Key International Honour Society and SALUTE Veterans National Honor Society. Golden Key International Honour Society recognizes academic excellence and encourages scholastic achievement among college students across all disciplines. SALUTE Veterans National Honor Society recognizes academically outstanding student veterans and military.

=== Diversity initiatives ===
Diversity initiatives at the University of the Rockies were driven by the President's Diversity Council, the Diversity Task Force, and the Faculty Diversity Council. Diversity awards and recognitions include:

- 2014 - INSIGHT Into Diversity Magazine recognized UoR Vice Provost Amy Kahn as a Diversity Visionary with a lifetime achievement in diversity award
- 2014 - Profiles in Diversity Journal selected UoR Provost Tina Parscal as one of the Women Worth Watching
- 2013, 2014 - Profiles in Diversity Journal's Innovations in Diversity Award (Honorable Mention)
- 2013 - The Corporation for National and Community Service named University of the Rockies on the President's Higher Education Community Service Honor Roll
- 2012, 2013 - INSIGHT Into Diversity's Higher Education Excellence in Diversity (HEED) Award
- 2011 - Profiles in Diversity Journal selected Janet Brugger as one of the Women Worth Watching
- 2011 - Profiles in Diversity Journal's Diversity Leader Award
- 2010, 2013 - Colorado Springs Diversity Forum's Raising the Bar Award
- 2010, 2011 - Profiles in Diversity Journal's International Innovation in Diversity Award
- 2010 - Profiles in Diversity Journal selected UoR President Charlita Shelton as one of the Women Worth Watching
- 2010 - DiversityBusiness.com recognized UoR President Charlita Shelton with the 2010 Champion of Diversity Award

== University of the Rockies Press ==
University of the Rockies Press published and disseminated books on clinical psychology, religion and spirituality, business and organizational leadership, and health and well-being. As of March 2015, there are seven published books under UoR Press.

== Community relations ==
The university and its employees supported several volunteer efforts in the community and partnered with the American Red Cross of the Colorado/Wyoming Region, Book Trust, Boys and Girls Clubs of Metro Denver, Brain Tumor Alliance, Junior Achievement, and Mi Casa.
