= Delta Alpha Pi (honor society) =

Disability-focused American organization

- ΔΑΠ
- Founded: 2004; 21 years ago East Stroudsburg University of Pennsylvania
- Type: Honor
- Affiliation: Independent
- Status: Active
- Emphasis: Students with disabilities
- Scope: International
- Motto: "Working for an aDAPtable World"
- Colors: Royal blue and Gold
- Flower: Sunflower
- Mascot: Turtle
- Chapters: 200+
- Headquarters: 5540 Montauk Lane; Bethlehem, Pennsylvania 18017-8909; United States
- Website: deltaalphapihonorsociety.org

Delta Alpha Pi (ΔΑΠ) is an American honor society founded in 2004 to recognize high-achieving college and university students with disabilities. Membership is open to both undergraduate and graduate students at colleges and universities with chartered chapters of DAPi who meet certain criteria.

== History ==
Delta Alpha Pi was founded in 2004 at East Stroudsburg University of Pennsylvania as an honor society to recognize high-achieving college and university students with disabilities. Its second chapter was started at Edinboro University in 2005. It became a national organization in 2006.

In 2008, it was registered as a not-for-profit 501(c)(3) organization, Delta Alpha Pi International Honor Society. Its national headquarters is in Bethlehem, Pennsylvania.

== Symbols ==
The three Greek letters have specific meanings. The letter Delta was selected to represent Disability. Alpha stands for Achievement and Pi stands for Pride. The society's motto is "Working for an aDAPtable World".

Delta Alpha Pi's colors are royal blue and gold; blue represents perseverance and justice, and gold stands for the pursuit of excellence. Graduating members may wear honor cords in the society's colors of royal blue and gold.

Its flower is the sunflower, which turns toward the light. Its mascot is the turtle, which works slowly and steadily to reach its goal.

== Membership ==
Membership in Delta Alpha Pi is open to undergraduate and graduate students at colleges and universities with chartered chapters of DAPi and who meet certain criteria. Members must have a documented disability, have an interest in disability issues, have at least a 3.1 GPA, have completed 24 credits.

== Chapters ==
As of 2024, Delta Alpha Pi has established more than 200 chapters.
