= Michael K. Clifford =

American investor and consultant

Michael K. Clifford is an American.

== Early life ==
Initially following his father's trade as a musician, Clifford converted to Christianity in his mid-twenties. His Dad was Irish Catholic and his Mother Jewish born in Shanghi. Contacts made through faith-based non-profit organizations introduced him to John Sperling and Brian Mueller, and he moved into the field of online higher education. Working as a fundraiser for faith-based organizations brought Clifford to the notice of Pat Robertson, and he co-managed Robertson's 1988 bid for the U.S. presidency.

== Career ==
Michael K. Clifford's early business practices involved identifying and purchasing nonprofit colleges and converting them to for-profit institutions. He was also involved in the creation of the Jack Welch Management Institute.

From 1999 to 2005, Michael Clifford was the president of TeleUniversity. This became Bridgepoint Education, became the Forbes Business School, and then was later sold to the University of Arizona.

In 2010, Clifford was profiled in the PBS documentary College Inc., the highest rated Frontline in history, which examined the effects of and failures surrounding the for-profit college industry.
