= Fullstack Academy =

Coding bootcamp school in New York City, US

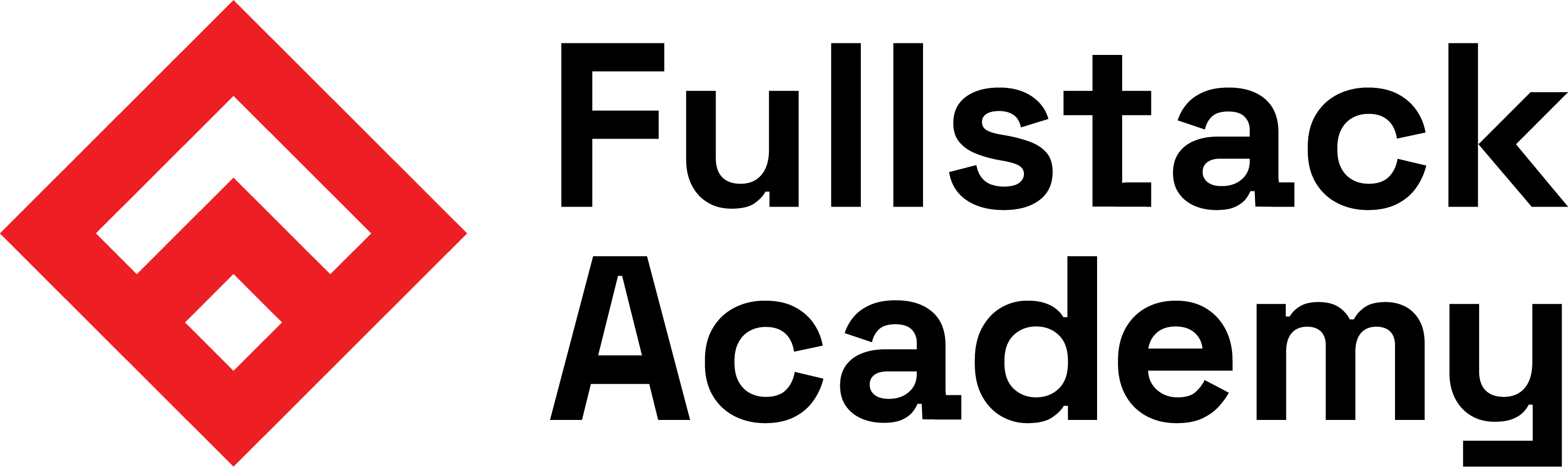
- United States

Information
- School type: Coding bootcamp
- Established: 2012
- Founders: David Yang, Nimit Maru (co-founders)
- Classes offered: Software engineering, Cybersecurity, Data analytics, Artificial intelligence
- Campus type: Online
- Website: fullstackacademy.com

Fullstack Academy is a technology education provider headquartered in New York City. Founded in 2012, it offers synchronous, live online training through accelerated bootcamp programs in fields including artificial intelligence & machine learning, cybersecurity, data analytics, and software engineering.

== History ==
Fullstack Academy was founded in 2012 by David Yang (formerly of Yahoo!, Gilt) and Wharton School alumnus Nimit Maru (formerly of Yahoo!, Bloomspot). The company joined the Spring 2012 cohort of Y Combinator. Fullstack Academy began enrolling students in 2013. In 2019, Fullstack Academy was acquired by Bridgepoint Education (later known as Zovio). Founders David Yang and Nimit Maru left the company in 2021. In 2022, Fullstack Academy was acquired by a digital skills training company, Simplilearn. Under this new structure, Fullstack Academy maintains its brand identity but operates under the Simplilearn umbrella.

== Partnerships ==
Fullstack Academy collaborates with higher education institutions across the United States to deliver tech bootcamps. Under this model, the academy provides the bootcamp curriculum, live instruction, and career services in collaboration with the universities. As an Amazon Web Services (AWS) authorized training partner, Fullstack Academy programs are designed to meet the AWS training standards. The company also participates in the Amazon Career Choice program, which provides eligible Amazon employees with access to certain training programs.

== Programs ==
Fullstack Academy delivers synchronous, live online vocational training in software engineering, cybersecurity, data analytics, and artificial intelligence. The institution provides a project-based curriculum in which students apply theoretical concepts to real-world, scenario-based assignments. Programs are taught live online by instructors with professional backgrounds in their respective industries. Enrollment options typically include both full-time and part-time schedules.

- Software Engineering: The software engineering bootcamp covers front-end, back-end, and full-stack development, with a JavaScript-based curriculum. Graduates produce a portfolio of projects intended to demonstrate technical competency to prospective employers.
- Cybersecurity: The cybersecurity bootcamp covers both offensive and defensive security concepts, including threat analysis, vulnerability assessment, and system protection strategies. The program incorporates preparation for the CompTIA Security+ certification examination.
- Data Analytics: The data analytics program addresses statistical analysis, data wrangling, visualization, and data cleaning. It incorporates preparation for the Tableau certification examination. No prior experience in technology or data analytics is required for enrollment.
- Artificial Intelligence and Machine Learning: The AI and machine learning bootcamp is offered as a part-time program. It covers neural networks, deep learning, natural language processing, generative AI, and predictive modeling, with an emphasis on both theoretical foundations and practical implementation.

Fullstack Academy provides career support services to students during enrollment and for up to one year following graduation. Services include job search assistance, resume guidance, LinkedIn profile development, interview preparation, and one-on-one coaching from career professionals with backgrounds in the technology industry.

== Rankings and Media ==
Course Report has listed Fullstack Academy bootcamps in its annual rankings for "Best Coding Bootcamps," "Best Cyber Security Bootcamps," and "Best Online Bootcamps". In 2024, Forbes Advisor included the academy in its list of best online artificial intelligence bootcamps. The school has also been covered in articles by Mashable, Fortune, and U.S. News & World Report.

== See also ==
- Web Development
