= List of minor planets: 101001–102000 =

The following is a partial list of minor planets, running from minor-planet number 101001 through 102000, inclusive. The primary data for this and other partial lists is based on JPL's "Small-Body Orbital Elements" and data available from the Minor Planet Center. Critical list information is also provided by the MPC, unless otherwise specified from Lowell Observatory. A detailed description of the table's columns and additional sources are given on the main page including a complete list of every page in this series, and a statistical break-up on the dynamical classification of minor planets.

Also see the summary list of all named bodies in numerical and alphabetical order, and the corresponding naming citations for the number range of this particular list. New namings may only be added to this list after official publication, as the preannouncement of names is condemned by the Working Group for Small Bodies Nomenclature of the International Astronomical Union.

| Near-Earth obj. | MBA (inner) | MBA (outer) | Centaur |
| Mars-crosser | MBA (middle) | Jupiter trojan | Trans-Neptunian obj. |
| Unclassified |

== 101001–101100 ==
| Designation | | | Discovery | | | Properties | | Ref |
| Permanent | Provisional | Named after | Date | Site | Discoverer(s) | Category | Diam. | Ref |
|---|---|---|---|---|---|---|---|---|
| 101001 | 1998 QD_{46} | — | August 17, 1998 | Socorro | LINEAR | · | 2.6 km | MPC · JPL |
| 101002 | 1998 QE_{46} | — | August 17, 1998 | Socorro | LINEAR | · | 1.2 km | MPC · JPL |
| 101003 | 1998 QW_{46} | — | August 17, 1998 | Socorro | LINEAR | · | 1.8 km | MPC · JPL |
| 101004 | 1998 QY_{46} | — | August 17, 1998 | Socorro | LINEAR | (5) | 1.9 km | MPC · JPL |
| 101005 | 1998 QD_{47} | — | August 17, 1998 | Socorro | LINEAR | · | 1.7 km | MPC · JPL |
| 101006 | 1998 QG_{47} | — | August 17, 1998 | Socorro | LINEAR | · | 3.0 km | MPC · JPL |
| 101007 | 1998 QM_{48} | — | August 17, 1998 | Socorro | LINEAR | · | 2.0 km | MPC · JPL |
| 101008 | 1998 QO_{48} | — | August 17, 1998 | Socorro | LINEAR | · | 1.3 km | MPC · JPL |
| 101009 | 1998 QQ_{48} | — | August 17, 1998 | Socorro | LINEAR | · | 2.0 km | MPC · JPL |
| 101010 | 1998 QX_{48} | — | August 17, 1998 | Socorro | LINEAR | · | 1.7 km | MPC · JPL |
| 101011 | 1998 QS_{49} | — | August 17, 1998 | Socorro | LINEAR | · | 2.9 km | MPC · JPL |
| 101012 | 1998 QJ_{50} | — | August 17, 1998 | Socorro | LINEAR | · | 2.0 km | MPC · JPL |
| 101013 | 1998 QV_{52} | — | August 20, 1998 | Anderson Mesa | LONEOS | · | 4.5 km | MPC · JPL |
| 101014 | 1998 QL_{54} | — | August 27, 1998 | Anderson Mesa | LONEOS | · | 1.7 km | MPC · JPL |
| 101015 | 1998 QE_{55} | — | August 27, 1998 | Anderson Mesa | LONEOS | · | 3.5 km | MPC · JPL |
| 101016 | 1998 QP_{55} | — | August 26, 1998 | Caussols | ODAS | · | 5.4 km | MPC · JPL |
| 101017 | 1998 QR_{56} | — | August 30, 1998 | Kitt Peak | Spacewatch | MAS | 1.2 km | MPC · JPL |
| 101018 | 1998 QB_{57} | — | August 30, 1998 | Kitt Peak | Spacewatch | · | 4.9 km | MPC · JPL |
| 101019 | 1998 QQ_{57} | — | August 30, 1998 | Kitt Peak | Spacewatch | · | 1.9 km | MPC · JPL |
| 101020 | 1998 QF_{59} | — | August 26, 1998 | Kitt Peak | Spacewatch | · | 3.3 km | MPC · JPL |
| 101021 | 1998 QR_{59} | — | August 26, 1998 | Kitt Peak | Spacewatch | · | 2.8 km | MPC · JPL |
| 101022 | 1998 QA_{60} | — | August 26, 1998 | Kitt Peak | Spacewatch | · | 2.3 km | MPC · JPL |
| 101023 | 1998 QB_{61} | — | August 23, 1998 | Anderson Mesa | LONEOS | EOS | 4.7 km | MPC · JPL |
| 101024 | 1998 QO_{61} | — | August 29, 1998 | Anderson Mesa | LONEOS | · | 1.6 km | MPC · JPL |
| 101025 | 1998 QJ_{63} | — | August 30, 1998 | Bergisch Gladbach | W. Bickel | · | 1.8 km | MPC · JPL |
| 101026 | 1998 QT_{63} | — | August 30, 1998 | Xinglong | SCAP | · | 1.6 km | MPC · JPL |
| 101027 | 1998 QL_{71} | — | August 24, 1998 | Socorro | LINEAR | · | 2.2 km | MPC · JPL |
| 101028 | 1998 QZ_{74} | — | August 24, 1998 | Socorro | LINEAR | · | 4.6 km | MPC · JPL |
| 101029 | 1998 QJ_{75} | — | August 24, 1998 | Socorro | LINEAR | · | 2.8 km | MPC · JPL |
| 101030 | 1998 QF_{76} | — | August 24, 1998 | Socorro | LINEAR | · | 2.9 km | MPC · JPL |
| 101031 | 1998 QU_{76} | — | August 24, 1998 | Socorro | LINEAR | V | 1.5 km | MPC · JPL |
| 101032 | 1998 QM_{80} | — | August 24, 1998 | Socorro | LINEAR | · | 5.2 km | MPC · JPL |
| 101033 | 1998 QR_{82} | — | August 24, 1998 | Socorro | LINEAR | GEF | 2.7 km | MPC · JPL |
| 101034 | 1998 QT_{82} | — | August 24, 1998 | Socorro | LINEAR | · | 2.9 km | MPC · JPL |
| 101035 | 1998 QL_{83} | — | August 24, 1998 | Socorro | LINEAR | · | 2.2 km | MPC · JPL |
| 101036 | 1998 QF_{87} | — | August 24, 1998 | Socorro | LINEAR | · | 5.4 km | MPC · JPL |
| 101037 | 1998 QX_{90} | — | August 28, 1998 | Socorro | LINEAR | · | 1.9 km | MPC · JPL |
| 101038 | 1998 QA_{96} | — | August 19, 1998 | Socorro | LINEAR | T_{j} (2.92) | 3.7 km | MPC · JPL |
| 101039 | 1998 QM_{97} | — | August 24, 1998 | Socorro | LINEAR | JUN | 2.2 km | MPC · JPL |
| 101040 | 1998 QJ_{98} | — | August 28, 1998 | Socorro | LINEAR | EUN | 2.9 km | MPC · JPL |
| 101041 | 1998 QV_{98} | — | August 31, 1998 | Kleť | Kleť | PHO | 3.2 km | MPC · JPL |
| 101042 | 1998 QN_{99} | — | August 26, 1998 | La Silla | E. W. Elst | · | 1.9 km | MPC · JPL |
| 101043 | 1998 QP_{99} | — | August 26, 1998 | La Silla | E. W. Elst | NYS | 2.6 km | MPC · JPL |
| 101044 | 1998 QU_{99} | — | August 26, 1998 | La Silla | E. W. Elst | NYS | 1.7 km | MPC · JPL |
| 101045 | 1998 QN_{100} | — | August 26, 1998 | La Silla | E. W. Elst | · | 2.3 km | MPC · JPL |
| 101046 | 1998 QQ_{100} | — | August 26, 1998 | La Silla | E. W. Elst | · | 3.4 km | MPC · JPL |
| 101047 | 1998 QU_{100} | — | August 26, 1998 | La Silla | E. W. Elst | NYS | 2.4 km | MPC · JPL |
| 101048 | 1998 QM_{101} | — | August 26, 1998 | La Silla | E. W. Elst | · | 1.6 km | MPC · JPL |
| 101049 | 1998 QD_{105} | — | August 25, 1998 | La Silla | E. W. Elst | · | 2.4 km | MPC · JPL |
| 101050 | 1998 QM_{105} | — | August 25, 1998 | La Silla | E. W. Elst | · | 1.4 km | MPC · JPL |
| 101051 | 1998 QK_{106} | — | August 25, 1998 | La Silla | E. W. Elst | · | 2.4 km | MPC · JPL |
| 101052 | 1998 QK_{109} | — | August 17, 1998 | Socorro | LINEAR | · | 1.4 km | MPC · JPL |
| 101053 | 1998 QN_{110} | — | August 26, 1998 | Anderson Mesa | LONEOS | · | 3.6 km | MPC · JPL |
| 101054 | 1998 QP_{110} | — | August 26, 1998 | Anderson Mesa | LONEOS | · | 1.5 km | MPC · JPL |
| 101055 | 1998 RL | — | September 1, 1998 | Xinglong | SCAP | · | 2.1 km | MPC · JPL |
| 101056 | 1998 RF_{1} | — | September 10, 1998 | Višnjan Observatory | Višnjan | · | 1.7 km | MPC · JPL |
| 101057 | 1998 RD_{3} | — | September 15, 1998 | Kitt Peak | Spacewatch | · | 3.3 km | MPC · JPL |
| 101058 | 1998 RN_{3} | — | September 14, 1998 | Socorro | LINEAR | T_{j} (2.9) | 4.7 km | MPC · JPL |
| 101059 | 1998 RR_{3} | — | September 14, 1998 | Socorro | LINEAR | H | 850 m | MPC · JPL |
| 101060 | 1998 RE_{4} | — | September 14, 1998 | Socorro | LINEAR | PHO | 4.1 km | MPC · JPL |
| 101061 | 1998 RL_{4} | — | September 14, 1998 | Socorro | LINEAR | PHO | 4.2 km | MPC · JPL |
| 101062 | 1998 RF_{5} | — | September 15, 1998 | Caussols | ODAS | · | 2.0 km | MPC · JPL |
| 101063 | 1998 RB_{6} | — | September 14, 1998 | Anderson Mesa | LONEOS | · | 3.2 km | MPC · JPL |
| 101064 | 1998 RG_{8} | — | September 12, 1998 | Kitt Peak | Spacewatch | · | 5.7 km | MPC · JPL |
| 101065 | 1998 RV_{11} | — | September 13, 1998 | Kitt Peak | Spacewatch | · | 2.8 km | MPC · JPL |
| 101066 | 1998 RP_{13} | — | September 13, 1998 | Kitt Peak | Spacewatch | · | 4.2 km | MPC · JPL |
| 101067 | 1998 RJ_{14} | — | September 14, 1998 | Kitt Peak | Spacewatch | · | 4.1 km | MPC · JPL |
| 101068 | 1998 RO_{14} | — | September 14, 1998 | Kitt Peak | Spacewatch | · | 3.0 km | MPC · JPL |
| 101069 | 1998 RX_{14} | — | September 15, 1998 | Kitt Peak | Spacewatch | · | 2.0 km | MPC · JPL |
| 101070 | 1998 RY_{15} | — | September 14, 1998 | Xinglong | SCAP | ERI | 1.5 km | MPC · JPL |
| 101071 | 1998 RE_{17} | — | September 14, 1998 | Socorro | LINEAR | · | 2.7 km | MPC · JPL |
| 101072 | 1998 RN_{18} | — | September 14, 1998 | Socorro | LINEAR | (5) | 1.9 km | MPC · JPL |
| 101073 | 1998 RU_{18} | — | September 14, 1998 | Socorro | LINEAR | · | 1.6 km | MPC · JPL |
| 101074 | 1998 RY_{19} | — | September 14, 1998 | Socorro | LINEAR | · | 1.7 km | MPC · JPL |
| 101075 | 1998 RN_{20} | — | September 13, 1998 | Anderson Mesa | LONEOS | · | 3.3 km | MPC · JPL |
| 101076 | 1998 RM_{21} | — | September 15, 1998 | Kitt Peak | Spacewatch | · | 2.6 km | MPC · JPL |
| 101077 | 1998 RH_{22} | — | September 14, 1998 | Socorro | LINEAR | EUN | 2.0 km | MPC · JPL |
| 101078 | 1998 RF_{24} | — | September 14, 1998 | Socorro | LINEAR | · | 2.5 km | MPC · JPL |
| 101079 | 1998 RW_{24} | — | September 14, 1998 | Socorro | LINEAR | · | 2.6 km | MPC · JPL |
| 101080 | 1998 RB_{25} | — | September 14, 1998 | Socorro | LINEAR | · | 3.9 km | MPC · JPL |
| 101081 | 1998 RU_{25} | — | September 14, 1998 | Socorro | LINEAR | · | 1.3 km | MPC · JPL |
| 101082 | 1998 RO_{26} | — | September 14, 1998 | Socorro | LINEAR | · | 3.1 km | MPC · JPL |
| 101083 | 1998 RK_{27} | — | September 14, 1998 | Socorro | LINEAR | fast | 4.6 km | MPC · JPL |
| 101084 | 1998 RV_{28} | — | September 14, 1998 | Socorro | LINEAR | (2076) | 2.0 km | MPC · JPL |
| 101085 | 1998 RL_{29} | — | September 14, 1998 | Socorro | LINEAR | NYS | 2.5 km | MPC · JPL |
| 101086 | 1998 RG_{31} | — | September 14, 1998 | Socorro | LINEAR | · | 6.0 km | MPC · JPL |
| 101087 | 1998 RC_{32} | — | September 14, 1998 | Socorro | LINEAR | · | 3.8 km | MPC · JPL |
| 101088 | 1998 RD_{32} | — | September 14, 1998 | Socorro | LINEAR | · | 2.0 km | MPC · JPL |
| 101089 | 1998 RR_{32} | — | September 14, 1998 | Socorro | LINEAR | · | 1.8 km | MPC · JPL |
| 101090 | 1998 RG_{33} | — | September 14, 1998 | Socorro | LINEAR | · | 6.1 km | MPC · JPL |
| 101091 | 1998 RW_{33} | — | September 14, 1998 | Socorro | LINEAR | (2076) | 2.1 km | MPC · JPL |
| 101092 | 1998 RE_{35} | — | September 14, 1998 | Socorro | LINEAR | MAS | 1.2 km | MPC · JPL |
| 101093 | 1998 RE_{36} | — | September 14, 1998 | Socorro | LINEAR | NYS | 2.0 km | MPC · JPL |
| 101094 | 1998 RJ_{36} | — | September 14, 1998 | Socorro | LINEAR | · | 2.4 km | MPC · JPL |
| 101095 | 1998 RX_{36} | — | September 14, 1998 | Socorro | LINEAR | V | 1.2 km | MPC · JPL |
| 101096 | 1998 RL_{37} | — | September 14, 1998 | Socorro | LINEAR | · | 1.6 km | MPC · JPL |
| 101097 | 1998 RB_{39} | — | September 14, 1998 | Socorro | LINEAR | · | 1.7 km | MPC · JPL |
| 101098 | 1998 RG_{39} | — | September 14, 1998 | Socorro | LINEAR | · | 2.0 km | MPC · JPL |
| 101099 | 1998 RK_{41} | — | September 14, 1998 | Socorro | LINEAR | · | 5.1 km | MPC · JPL |
| 101100 | 1998 RM_{41} | — | September 14, 1998 | Socorro | LINEAR | RAF | 1.4 km | MPC · JPL |

== 101101–101200 ==
back to top

| Designation | | | Discovery | | | Properties | | Ref |
| Permanent | Provisional | Named after | Date | Site | Discoverer(s) | Category | Diam. | Ref |
|---|---|---|---|---|---|---|---|---|
| 101101 Carmichael | 1998 RO_{41} | Carmichael | September 14, 1998 | Socorro | LINEAR | · | 2.3 km | MPC · JPL |
| 101102 | 1998 RW_{41} | — | September 14, 1998 | Socorro | LINEAR | (5) | 2.1 km | MPC · JPL |
| 101103 | 1998 RA_{42} | — | September 14, 1998 | Socorro | LINEAR | · | 4.5 km | MPC · JPL |
| 101104 | 1998 RC_{42} | — | September 14, 1998 | Socorro | LINEAR | · | 4.4 km | MPC · JPL |
| 101105 | 1998 RS_{42} | — | September 14, 1998 | Socorro | LINEAR | · | 1.8 km | MPC · JPL |
| 101106 | 1998 RA_{43} | — | September 14, 1998 | Socorro | LINEAR | · | 4.1 km | MPC · JPL |
| 101107 | 1998 RE_{45} | — | September 14, 1998 | Socorro | LINEAR | · | 3.2 km | MPC · JPL |
| 101108 | 1998 RS_{45} | — | September 14, 1998 | Socorro | LINEAR | · | 2.3 km | MPC · JPL |
| 101109 | 1998 RZ_{45} | — | September 14, 1998 | Socorro | LINEAR | · | 2.8 km | MPC · JPL |
| 101110 | 1998 RV_{48} | — | September 14, 1998 | Socorro | LINEAR | · | 1.9 km | MPC · JPL |
| 101111 | 1998 RZ_{48} | — | September 14, 1998 | Socorro | LINEAR | · | 4.8 km | MPC · JPL |
| 101112 | 1998 RG_{51} | — | September 14, 1998 | Socorro | LINEAR | · | 1.7 km | MPC · JPL |
| 101113 | 1998 RM_{51} | — | September 14, 1998 | Socorro | LINEAR | · | 2.3 km | MPC · JPL |
| 101114 | 1998 RW_{51} | — | September 14, 1998 | Socorro | LINEAR | · | 2.4 km | MPC · JPL |
| 101115 | 1998 RX_{51} | — | September 14, 1998 | Socorro | LINEAR | · | 2.4 km | MPC · JPL |
| 101116 | 1998 RD_{52} | — | September 14, 1998 | Socorro | LINEAR | · | 3.0 km | MPC · JPL |
| 101117 | 1998 RA_{53} | — | September 14, 1998 | Socorro | LINEAR | (5) | 2.0 km | MPC · JPL |
| 101118 | 1998 RJ_{53} | — | September 14, 1998 | Socorro | LINEAR | NYS | 2.0 km | MPC · JPL |
| 101119 | 1998 RK_{53} | — | September 14, 1998 | Socorro | LINEAR | · | 1.5 km | MPC · JPL |
| 101120 | 1998 RO_{53} | — | September 14, 1998 | Socorro | LINEAR | · | 1.9 km | MPC · JPL |
| 101121 | 1998 RO_{54} | — | September 14, 1998 | Socorro | LINEAR | · | 2.0 km | MPC · JPL |
| 101122 | 1998 RR_{54} | — | September 14, 1998 | Socorro | LINEAR | V | 1.6 km | MPC · JPL |
| 101123 | 1998 RH_{55} | — | September 14, 1998 | Socorro | LINEAR | · | 3.8 km | MPC · JPL |
| 101124 | 1998 RD_{56} | — | September 14, 1998 | Socorro | LINEAR | · | 2.8 km | MPC · JPL |
| 101125 | 1998 RO_{56} | — | September 14, 1998 | Socorro | LINEAR | · | 2.0 km | MPC · JPL |
| 101126 | 1998 RC_{57} | — | September 14, 1998 | Socorro | LINEAR | (2076) | 1.6 km | MPC · JPL |
| 101127 | 1998 RE_{57} | — | September 14, 1998 | Socorro | LINEAR | · | 1.7 km | MPC · JPL |
| 101128 | 1998 RX_{57} | — | September 14, 1998 | Socorro | LINEAR | · | 2.5 km | MPC · JPL |
| 101129 | 1998 RU_{58} | — | September 14, 1998 | Socorro | LINEAR | · | 1.9 km | MPC · JPL |
| 101130 | 1998 RQ_{59} | — | September 14, 1998 | Socorro | LINEAR | (5) | 2.4 km | MPC · JPL |
| 101131 | 1998 RW_{59} | — | September 14, 1998 | Socorro | LINEAR | EUN | 2.3 km | MPC · JPL |
| 101132 | 1998 RP_{60} | — | September 14, 1998 | Socorro | LINEAR | · | 2.5 km | MPC · JPL |
| 101133 | 1998 RR_{60} | — | September 14, 1998 | Socorro | LINEAR | ERI | 3.6 km | MPC · JPL |
| 101134 | 1998 RV_{60} | — | September 14, 1998 | Socorro | LINEAR | · | 1.7 km | MPC · JPL |
| 101135 | 1998 RZ_{60} | — | September 14, 1998 | Socorro | LINEAR | · | 2.0 km | MPC · JPL |
| 101136 | 1998 RF_{64} | — | September 14, 1998 | Socorro | LINEAR | · | 4.1 km | MPC · JPL |
| 101137 | 1998 RV_{64} | — | September 14, 1998 | Socorro | LINEAR | · | 1.6 km | MPC · JPL |
| 101138 | 1998 RY_{65} | — | September 14, 1998 | Socorro | LINEAR | · | 3.2 km | MPC · JPL |
| 101139 | 1998 RA_{66} | — | September 14, 1998 | Socorro | LINEAR | · | 2.0 km | MPC · JPL |
| 101140 | 1998 RY_{67} | — | September 14, 1998 | Socorro | LINEAR | MIS | 3.4 km | MPC · JPL |
| 101141 | 1998 RR_{68} | — | September 14, 1998 | Socorro | LINEAR | · | 1.9 km | MPC · JPL |
| 101142 | 1998 RQ_{69} | — | September 14, 1998 | Socorro | LINEAR | · | 3.7 km | MPC · JPL |
| 101143 | 1998 RS_{69} | — | September 14, 1998 | Socorro | LINEAR | · | 3.3 km | MPC · JPL |
| 101144 | 1998 RT_{69} | — | September 14, 1998 | Socorro | LINEAR | (5) | 4.8 km | MPC · JPL |
| 101145 | 1998 RD_{70} | — | September 14, 1998 | Socorro | LINEAR | NYS | 2.7 km | MPC · JPL |
| 101146 | 1998 RK_{70} | — | September 14, 1998 | Socorro | LINEAR | · | 2.2 km | MPC · JPL |
| 101147 | 1998 RS_{70} | — | September 14, 1998 | Socorro | LINEAR | · | 1.7 km | MPC · JPL |
| 101148 | 1998 RV_{70} | — | September 14, 1998 | Socorro | LINEAR | · | 1.9 km | MPC · JPL |
| 101149 | 1998 RY_{70} | — | September 14, 1998 | Socorro | LINEAR | · | 2.6 km | MPC · JPL |
| 101150 | 1998 RN_{71} | — | September 14, 1998 | Socorro | LINEAR | · | 1.7 km | MPC · JPL |
| 101151 | 1998 RB_{72} | — | September 14, 1998 | Socorro | LINEAR | · | 2.1 km | MPC · JPL |
| 101152 | 1998 RD_{72} | — | September 14, 1998 | Socorro | LINEAR | · | 1.4 km | MPC · JPL |
| 101153 | 1998 RP_{72} | — | September 14, 1998 | Socorro | LINEAR | HIL · 3:2 · (3561) | 10 km | MPC · JPL |
| 101154 | 1998 RE_{74} | — | September 14, 1998 | Socorro | LINEAR | · | 2.3 km | MPC · JPL |
| 101155 | 1998 RM_{74} | — | September 14, 1998 | Socorro | LINEAR | · | 1.8 km | MPC · JPL |
| 101156 | 1998 RQ_{74} | — | September 14, 1998 | Socorro | LINEAR | · | 2.5 km | MPC · JPL |
| 101157 | 1998 RN_{76} | — | September 14, 1998 | Socorro | LINEAR | · | 3.0 km | MPC · JPL |
| 101158 | 1998 RA_{77} | — | September 14, 1998 | Socorro | LINEAR | · | 1.4 km | MPC · JPL |
| 101159 | 1998 RU_{77} | — | September 14, 1998 | Socorro | LINEAR | · | 2.3 km | MPC · JPL |
| 101160 | 1998 RW_{77} | — | September 14, 1998 | Socorro | LINEAR | MAR | 1.8 km | MPC · JPL |
| 101161 | 1998 RJ_{78} | — | September 14, 1998 | Socorro | LINEAR | NYS · | 3.2 km | MPC · JPL |
| 101162 | 1998 RS_{78} | — | September 14, 1998 | Socorro | LINEAR | · | 1.6 km | MPC · JPL |
| 101163 | 1998 RR_{79} | — | September 14, 1998 | Socorro | LINEAR | · | 2.0 km | MPC · JPL |
| 101164 | 1998 RD_{80} | — | September 14, 1998 | Socorro | LINEAR | (5) | 2.4 km | MPC · JPL |
| 101165 | 1998 SS | — | September 16, 1998 | Caussols | ODAS | · | 4.0 km | MPC · JPL |
| 101166 | 1998 ST_{1} | — | September 16, 1998 | Caussols | ODAS | · | 2.1 km | MPC · JPL |
| 101167 | 1998 SW_{2} | — | September 19, 1998 | Catalina | CSS | PHO | 2.8 km | MPC · JPL |
| 101168 | 1998 SX_{2} | — | September 18, 1998 | Socorro | LINEAR | · | 3.2 km | MPC · JPL |
| 101169 | 1998 SR_{3} | — | September 18, 1998 | Caussols | ODAS | · | 2.4 km | MPC · JPL |
| 101170 | 1998 SU_{3} | — | September 18, 1998 | Caussols | ODAS | NYS | 2.2 km | MPC · JPL |
| 101171 | 1998 SA_{4} | — | September 18, 1998 | Caussols | ODAS | MAS | 1.6 km | MPC · JPL |
| 101172 | 1998 SF_{4} | — | September 19, 1998 | Prescott | P. G. Comba | · | 2.4 km | MPC · JPL |
| 101173 | 1998 SY_{4} | — | September 17, 1998 | Anderson Mesa | LONEOS | · | 2.4 km | MPC · JPL |
| 101174 | 1998 SZ_{4} | — | September 17, 1998 | Anderson Mesa | LONEOS | NYS | 1.8 km | MPC · JPL |
| 101175 | 1998 SO_{6} | — | September 20, 1998 | Kitt Peak | Spacewatch | · | 3.1 km | MPC · JPL |
| 101176 | 1998 SE_{7} | — | September 20, 1998 | Kitt Peak | Spacewatch | · | 2.3 km | MPC · JPL |
| 101177 | 1998 SM_{8} | — | September 20, 1998 | Kitt Peak | Spacewatch | NYS | 2.8 km | MPC · JPL |
| 101178 | 1998 SY_{8} | — | September 20, 1998 | Kitt Peak | Spacewatch | · | 2.8 km | MPC · JPL |
| 101179 | 1998 SA_{9} | — | September 20, 1998 | Kitt Peak | Spacewatch | · | 2.5 km | MPC · JPL |
| 101180 | 1998 SH_{9} | — | September 17, 1998 | Xinglong | SCAP | · | 3.6 km | MPC · JPL |
| 101181 | 1998 SZ_{9} | — | September 21, 1998 | Catalina | CSS | PHO | 2.9 km | MPC · JPL |
| 101182 | 1998 SY_{10} | — | September 17, 1998 | Caussols | ODAS | (5) | 2.4 km | MPC · JPL |
| 101183 | 1998 SR_{11} | — | September 19, 1998 | Caussols | ODAS | · | 1.9 km | MPC · JPL |
| 101184 | 1998 SP_{12} | — | September 21, 1998 | Catalina | CSS | PHO | 6.3 km | MPC · JPL |
| 101185 | 1998 SS_{12} | — | September 23, 1998 | Catalina | CSS | H | 1.4 km | MPC · JPL |
| 101186 | 1998 SD_{13} | — | September 23, 1998 | Ondřejov | P. Pravec | · | 2.1 km | MPC · JPL |
| 101187 | 1998 SV_{13} | — | September 16, 1998 | Anderson Mesa | LONEOS | · | 4.1 km | MPC · JPL |
| 101188 | 1998 SP_{14} | — | September 17, 1998 | Anderson Mesa | LONEOS | · | 5.7 km | MPC · JPL |
| 101189 | 1998 SW_{19} | — | September 20, 1998 | Kitt Peak | Spacewatch | · | 1.8 km | MPC · JPL |
| 101190 | 1998 SJ_{23} | — | September 17, 1998 | Anderson Mesa | LONEOS | V | 1.2 km | MPC · JPL |
| 101191 | 1998 SL_{23} | — | September 17, 1998 | Anderson Mesa | LONEOS | EUN | 3.6 km | MPC · JPL |
| 101192 | 1998 SO_{23} | — | September 17, 1998 | Anderson Mesa | LONEOS | · | 3.7 km | MPC · JPL |
| 101193 | 1998 SY_{23} | — | September 17, 1998 | Anderson Mesa | LONEOS | · | 2.1 km | MPC · JPL |
| 101194 | 1998 SO_{24} | — | September 17, 1998 | Anderson Mesa | LONEOS | · | 1.7 km | MPC · JPL |
| 101195 | 1998 SV_{25} | — | September 22, 1998 | Anderson Mesa | LONEOS | · | 1.8 km | MPC · JPL |
| 101196 | 1998 SM_{26} | — | September 24, 1998 | Prescott | P. G. Comba | THM | 6.2 km | MPC · JPL |
| 101197 | 1998 SH_{27} | — | September 25, 1998 | Ondřejov | P. Pravec | · | 2.6 km | MPC · JPL |
| 101198 | 1998 SK_{30} | — | September 19, 1998 | Kitt Peak | Spacewatch | · | 1.5 km | MPC · JPL |
| 101199 | 1998 SG_{32} | — | September 21, 1998 | Kitt Peak | Spacewatch | · | 3.4 km | MPC · JPL |
| 101200 | 1998 SH_{32} | — | September 21, 1998 | Kitt Peak | Spacewatch | H | 890 m | MPC · JPL |

== 101201–101300 ==
back to top

| Designation | | | Discovery | | | Properties | | Ref |
| Permanent | Provisional | Named after | Date | Site | Discoverer(s) | Category | Diam. | Ref |
|---|---|---|---|---|---|---|---|---|
| 101201 | 1998 SS_{33} | — | September 26, 1998 | Socorro | LINEAR | · | 2.0 km | MPC · JPL |
| 101202 | 1998 SN_{36} | — | September 19, 1998 | Kitt Peak | Spacewatch | · | 2.1 km | MPC · JPL |
| 101203 | 1998 SH_{39} | — | September 23, 1998 | Kitt Peak | Spacewatch | · | 2.2 km | MPC · JPL |
| 101204 | 1998 SV_{42} | — | September 17, 1998 | Xinglong | SCAP | · | 3.4 km | MPC · JPL |
| 101205 | 1998 SV_{46} | — | September 25, 1998 | Kitt Peak | Spacewatch | · | 2.9 km | MPC · JPL |
| 101206 | 1998 SX_{46} | — | September 25, 1998 | Kitt Peak | Spacewatch | · | 2.7 km | MPC · JPL |
| 101207 | 1998 SB_{47} | — | September 25, 1998 | Kitt Peak | Spacewatch | · | 3.7 km | MPC · JPL |
| 101208 | 1998 SF_{48} | — | September 27, 1998 | Kitt Peak | Spacewatch | · | 1.6 km | MPC · JPL |
| 101209 | 1998 SL_{48} | — | September 27, 1998 | Kitt Peak | Spacewatch | GEF | 2.1 km | MPC · JPL |
| 101210 | 1998 SW_{50} | — | September 26, 1998 | Kitt Peak | Spacewatch | · | 3.8 km | MPC · JPL |
| 101211 | 1998 SF_{51} | — | September 26, 1998 | Kitt Peak | Spacewatch | V | 1.2 km | MPC · JPL |
| 101212 | 1998 SK_{51} | — | September 27, 1998 | Kitt Peak | Spacewatch | ADE | 3.4 km | MPC · JPL |
| 101213 | 1998 SZ_{51} | — | September 28, 1998 | Kitt Peak | Spacewatch | KOR | 2.8 km | MPC · JPL |
| 101214 | 1998 SF_{52} | — | September 28, 1998 | Kitt Peak | Spacewatch | · | 2.8 km | MPC · JPL |
| 101215 | 1998 SC_{53} | — | September 30, 1998 | Kitt Peak | Spacewatch | AGN | 2.2 km | MPC · JPL |
| 101216 | 1998 SG_{53} | — | September 30, 1998 | Kitt Peak | Spacewatch | · | 3.1 km | MPC · JPL |
| 101217 | 1998 SG_{54} | — | September 16, 1998 | Anderson Mesa | LONEOS | · | 1.9 km | MPC · JPL |
| 101218 | 1998 SR_{54} | — | September 16, 1998 | Anderson Mesa | LONEOS | EUN | 2.1 km | MPC · JPL |
| 101219 | 1998 SM_{55} | — | September 16, 1998 | Anderson Mesa | LONEOS | · | 5.1 km | MPC · JPL |
| 101220 | 1998 ST_{57} | — | September 17, 1998 | Anderson Mesa | LONEOS | · | 2.8 km | MPC · JPL |
| 101221 | 1998 SB_{62} | — | September 18, 1998 | Anderson Mesa | LONEOS | · | 1.7 km | MPC · JPL |
| 101222 | 1998 SQ_{62} | — | September 20, 1998 | Xinglong | SCAP | · | 2.3 km | MPC · JPL |
| 101223 | 1998 SW_{62} | — | September 25, 1998 | Xinglong | SCAP | V | 1.2 km | MPC · JPL |
| 101224 | 1998 ST_{64} | — | September 20, 1998 | La Silla | E. W. Elst | NYS · | 4.4 km | MPC · JPL |
| 101225 | 1998 SO_{65} | — | September 20, 1998 | La Silla | E. W. Elst | · | 2.6 km | MPC · JPL |
| 101226 | 1998 SY_{66} | — | September 20, 1998 | La Silla | E. W. Elst | (5) | 2.5 km | MPC · JPL |
| 101227 | 1998 SX_{68} | — | September 19, 1998 | Socorro | LINEAR | · | 1.6 km | MPC · JPL |
| 101228 | 1998 SN_{69} | — | September 19, 1998 | Socorro | LINEAR | · | 2.0 km | MPC · JPL |
| 101229 | 1998 SJ_{71} | — | September 21, 1998 | La Silla | E. W. Elst | · | 1.8 km | MPC · JPL |
| 101230 | 1998 SV_{72} | — | September 21, 1998 | La Silla | E. W. Elst | · | 1.9 km | MPC · JPL |
| 101231 | 1998 SZ_{74} | — | September 21, 1998 | La Silla | E. W. Elst | MIS | 4.0 km | MPC · JPL |
| 101232 | 1998 SU_{75} | — | September 29, 1998 | Socorro | LINEAR | · | 2.1 km | MPC · JPL |
| 101233 | 1998 SF_{76} | — | September 19, 1998 | Socorro | LINEAR | V | 1.3 km | MPC · JPL |
| 101234 | 1998 SE_{77} | — | September 26, 1998 | Socorro | LINEAR | · | 2.6 km | MPC · JPL |
| 101235 | 1998 SB_{78} | — | September 26, 1998 | Socorro | LINEAR | NYS | 2.8 km | MPC · JPL |
| 101236 | 1998 SV_{78} | — | September 26, 1998 | Socorro | LINEAR | · | 1.8 km | MPC · JPL |
| 101237 | 1998 SE_{79} | — | September 26, 1998 | Socorro | LINEAR | V | 1.2 km | MPC · JPL |
| 101238 | 1998 SQ_{79} | — | September 26, 1998 | Socorro | LINEAR | · | 2.8 km | MPC · JPL |
| 101239 | 1998 SD_{80} | — | September 26, 1998 | Socorro | LINEAR | · | 2.2 km | MPC · JPL |
| 101240 | 1998 SG_{81} | — | September 26, 1998 | Socorro | LINEAR | · | 1.7 km | MPC · JPL |
| 101241 | 1998 SZ_{81} | — | September 26, 1998 | Socorro | LINEAR | V | 1.3 km | MPC · JPL |
| 101242 | 1998 SO_{82} | — | September 26, 1998 | Socorro | LINEAR | · | 4.1 km | MPC · JPL |
| 101243 | 1998 SW_{82} | — | September 26, 1998 | Socorro | LINEAR | · | 1.5 km | MPC · JPL |
| 101244 | 1998 SS_{83} | — | September 26, 1998 | Socorro | LINEAR | · | 2.0 km | MPC · JPL |
| 101245 | 1998 SD_{84} | — | September 26, 1998 | Socorro | LINEAR | · | 1.9 km | MPC · JPL |
| 101246 | 1998 SS_{87} | — | September 26, 1998 | Socorro | LINEAR | NYS | 3.0 km | MPC · JPL |
| 101247 | 1998 SV_{87} | — | September 26, 1998 | Socorro | LINEAR | V | 1.3 km | MPC · JPL |
| 101248 | 1998 ST_{88} | — | September 26, 1998 | Socorro | LINEAR | · | 2.0 km | MPC · JPL |
| 101249 | 1998 SQ_{89} | — | September 26, 1998 | Socorro | LINEAR | · | 2.2 km | MPC · JPL |
| 101250 | 1998 SR_{91} | — | September 26, 1998 | Socorro | LINEAR | · | 2.6 km | MPC · JPL |
| 101251 | 1998 SE_{92} | — | September 26, 1998 | Socorro | LINEAR | PAD | 4.9 km | MPC · JPL |
| 101252 | 1998 SO_{92} | — | September 26, 1998 | Socorro | LINEAR | · | 2.0 km | MPC · JPL |
| 101253 | 1998 SG_{93} | — | September 26, 1998 | Socorro | LINEAR | · | 4.6 km | MPC · JPL |
| 101254 | 1998 SK_{93} | — | September 26, 1998 | Socorro | LINEAR | · | 1.6 km | MPC · JPL |
| 101255 | 1998 SY_{93} | — | September 26, 1998 | Socorro | LINEAR | MAS | 1.2 km | MPC · JPL |
| 101256 | 1998 SA_{95} | — | September 26, 1998 | Socorro | LINEAR | · | 2.8 km | MPC · JPL |
| 101257 | 1998 SE_{95} | — | September 26, 1998 | Socorro | LINEAR | · | 2.1 km | MPC · JPL |
| 101258 | 1998 SF_{97} | — | September 26, 1998 | Socorro | LINEAR | · | 2.2 km | MPC · JPL |
| 101259 | 1998 SA_{98} | — | September 26, 1998 | Socorro | LINEAR | (5) | 4.5 km | MPC · JPL |
| 101260 | 1998 SU_{98} | — | September 26, 1998 | Socorro | LINEAR | · | 3.8 km | MPC · JPL |
| 101261 | 1998 SS_{102} | — | September 26, 1998 | Socorro | LINEAR | · | 2.1 km | MPC · JPL |
| 101262 | 1998 SU_{104} | — | September 26, 1998 | Socorro | LINEAR | · | 2.1 km | MPC · JPL |
| 101263 | 1998 SU_{105} | — | September 26, 1998 | Socorro | LINEAR | · | 1.4 km | MPC · JPL |
| 101264 | 1998 SW_{105} | — | September 26, 1998 | Socorro | LINEAR | EOS | 3.1 km | MPC · JPL |
| 101265 | 1998 SX_{105} | — | September 26, 1998 | Socorro | LINEAR | · | 1.9 km | MPC · JPL |
| 101266 | 1998 SJ_{107} | — | September 26, 1998 | Socorro | LINEAR | · | 2.0 km | MPC · JPL |
| 101267 | 1998 SU_{107} | — | September 26, 1998 | Socorro | LINEAR | · | 2.1 km | MPC · JPL |
| 101268 | 1998 SJ_{110} | — | September 26, 1998 | Socorro | LINEAR | · | 1.5 km | MPC · JPL |
| 101269 | 1998 SS_{110} | — | September 26, 1998 | Socorro | LINEAR | · | 2.9 km | MPC · JPL |
| 101270 | 1998 SQ_{111} | — | September 26, 1998 | Socorro | LINEAR | · | 1.6 km | MPC · JPL |
| 101271 | 1998 SU_{111} | — | September 26, 1998 | Socorro | LINEAR | · | 2.5 km | MPC · JPL |
| 101272 | 1998 SN_{113} | — | September 26, 1998 | Socorro | LINEAR | · | 3.0 km | MPC · JPL |
| 101273 | 1998 SO_{113} | — | September 26, 1998 | Socorro | LINEAR | · | 3.1 km | MPC · JPL |
| 101274 | 1998 SC_{114} | — | September 26, 1998 | Socorro | LINEAR | · | 1.5 km | MPC · JPL |
| 101275 | 1998 SF_{115} | — | September 26, 1998 | Socorro | LINEAR | · | 4.4 km | MPC · JPL |
| 101276 | 1998 SN_{115} | — | September 26, 1998 | Socorro | LINEAR | · | 2.7 km | MPC · JPL |
| 101277 | 1998 SS_{115} | — | September 26, 1998 | Socorro | LINEAR | · | 4.0 km | MPC · JPL |
| 101278 | 1998 SS_{116} | — | September 26, 1998 | Socorro | LINEAR | (5) | 4.8 km | MPC · JPL |
| 101279 | 1998 SX_{116} | — | September 26, 1998 | Socorro | LINEAR | · | 3.9 km | MPC · JPL |
| 101280 | 1998 SD_{117} | — | September 26, 1998 | Socorro | LINEAR | · | 1.7 km | MPC · JPL |
| 101281 | 1998 SP_{117} | — | September 26, 1998 | Socorro | LINEAR | · | 3.4 km | MPC · JPL |
| 101282 | 1998 SC_{118} | — | September 26, 1998 | Socorro | LINEAR | · | 1.6 km | MPC · JPL |
| 101283 | 1998 SJ_{118} | — | September 26, 1998 | Socorro | LINEAR | · | 6.1 km | MPC · JPL |
| 101284 | 1998 SH_{119} | — | September 26, 1998 | Socorro | LINEAR | · | 4.5 km | MPC · JPL |
| 101285 | 1998 SC_{124} | — | September 26, 1998 | Socorro | LINEAR | · | 3.1 km | MPC · JPL |
| 101286 | 1998 SF_{124} | — | September 26, 1998 | Socorro | LINEAR | · | 3.3 km | MPC · JPL |
| 101287 | 1998 SP_{124} | — | September 26, 1998 | Socorro | LINEAR | (5) | 2.1 km | MPC · JPL |
| 101288 | 1998 SA_{125} | — | September 26, 1998 | Socorro | LINEAR | · | 2.9 km | MPC · JPL |
| 101289 | 1998 SL_{125} | — | September 26, 1998 | Socorro | LINEAR | · | 1.2 km | MPC · JPL |
| 101290 | 1998 SO_{125} | — | September 26, 1998 | Socorro | LINEAR | (5) | 3.3 km | MPC · JPL |
| 101291 | 1998 SP_{125} | — | September 26, 1998 | Socorro | LINEAR | · | 1.6 km | MPC · JPL |
| 101292 | 1998 SM_{126} | — | September 26, 1998 | Socorro | LINEAR | · | 1.6 km | MPC · JPL |
| 101293 | 1998 SS_{126} | — | September 26, 1998 | Socorro | LINEAR | · | 3.4 km | MPC · JPL |
| 101294 | 1998 SW_{126} | — | September 26, 1998 | Socorro | LINEAR | DOR | 5.0 km | MPC · JPL |
| 101295 | 1998 SB_{127} | — | September 26, 1998 | Socorro | LINEAR | · | 2.1 km | MPC · JPL |
| 101296 | 1998 SE_{127} | — | September 26, 1998 | Socorro | LINEAR | · | 2.3 km | MPC · JPL |
| 101297 | 1998 SZ_{127} | — | September 26, 1998 | Socorro | LINEAR | NYS | 1.6 km | MPC · JPL |
| 101298 | 1998 SE_{128} | — | September 26, 1998 | Socorro | LINEAR | NYS | 1.4 km | MPC · JPL |
| 101299 | 1998 SL_{129} | — | September 26, 1998 | Socorro | LINEAR | NYS | 2.3 km | MPC · JPL |
| 101300 | 1998 SV_{129} | — | September 26, 1998 | Socorro | LINEAR | · | 2.4 km | MPC · JPL |

== 101301–101400 ==
back to top

| Designation | | | Discovery | | | Properties | | Ref |
| Permanent | Provisional | Named after | Date | Site | Discoverer(s) | Category | Diam. | Ref |
|---|---|---|---|---|---|---|---|---|
| 101301 | 1998 SH_{130} | — | September 26, 1998 | Socorro | LINEAR | · | 2.4 km | MPC · JPL |
| 101302 | 1998 SA_{131} | — | September 26, 1998 | Socorro | LINEAR | · | 3.8 km | MPC · JPL |
| 101303 | 1998 SE_{133} | — | September 26, 1998 | Socorro | LINEAR | NYS · | 3.2 km | MPC · JPL |
| 101304 | 1998 SJ_{133} | — | September 26, 1998 | Socorro | LINEAR | · | 2.4 km | MPC · JPL |
| 101305 | 1998 SL_{133} | — | September 26, 1998 | Socorro | LINEAR | · | 2.5 km | MPC · JPL |
| 101306 | 1998 SM_{133} | — | September 26, 1998 | Socorro | LINEAR | · | 2.8 km | MPC · JPL |
| 101307 | 1998 SU_{133} | — | September 26, 1998 | Socorro | LINEAR | · | 2.8 km | MPC · JPL |
| 101308 | 1998 SX_{133} | — | September 26, 1998 | Socorro | LINEAR | GAL | 3.2 km | MPC · JPL |
| 101309 | 1998 SZ_{135} | — | September 26, 1998 | Socorro | LINEAR | NYS | 2.3 km | MPC · JPL |
| 101310 | 1998 SJ_{136} | — | September 26, 1998 | Socorro | LINEAR | NYS | 1.8 km | MPC · JPL |
| 101311 | 1998 SA_{138} | — | September 26, 1998 | Socorro | LINEAR | · | 2.0 km | MPC · JPL |
| 101312 | 1998 SO_{138} | — | September 26, 1998 | Socorro | LINEAR | · | 3.8 km | MPC · JPL |
| 101313 | 1998 SA_{142} | — | September 26, 1998 | Socorro | LINEAR | MRX | 2.4 km | MPC · JPL |
| 101314 | 1998 SD_{142} | — | September 26, 1998 | Socorro | LINEAR | · | 2.0 km | MPC · JPL |
| 101315 | 1998 SL_{143} | — | September 18, 1998 | La Silla | E. W. Elst | · | 3.9 km | MPC · JPL |
| 101316 | 1998 SS_{145} | — | September 20, 1998 | La Silla | E. W. Elst | NYS | 1.9 km | MPC · JPL |
| 101317 | 1998 SD_{149} | — | September 26, 1998 | Socorro | LINEAR | · | 2.3 km | MPC · JPL |
| 101318 | 1998 SJ_{151} | — | September 26, 1998 | Socorro | LINEAR | (5) | 1.9 km | MPC · JPL |
| 101319 | 1998 SW_{152} | — | September 26, 1998 | Socorro | LINEAR | · | 2.1 km | MPC · JPL |
| 101320 | 1998 SY_{153} | — | September 26, 1998 | Socorro | LINEAR | · | 2.0 km | MPC · JPL |
| 101321 | 1998 SP_{154} | — | September 26, 1998 | Socorro | LINEAR | · | 3.5 km | MPC · JPL |
| 101322 | 1998 SA_{155} | — | September 26, 1998 | Socorro | LINEAR | · | 4.1 km | MPC · JPL |
| 101323 | 1998 SO_{155} | — | September 26, 1998 | Socorro | LINEAR | · | 2.1 km | MPC · JPL |
| 101324 | 1998 SC_{157} | — | September 26, 1998 | Socorro | LINEAR | · | 1.4 km | MPC · JPL |
| 101325 | 1998 SO_{159} | — | September 26, 1998 | Socorro | LINEAR | · | 4.3 km | MPC · JPL |
| 101326 | 1998 SS_{159} | — | September 26, 1998 | Socorro | LINEAR | · | 2.2 km | MPC · JPL |
| 101327 | 1998 SW_{161} | — | September 26, 1998 | Socorro | LINEAR | NYS | 1.7 km | MPC · JPL |
| 101328 | 1998 SJ_{162} | — | September 26, 1998 | Socorro | LINEAR | · | 1.9 km | MPC · JPL |
| 101329 | 1998 SZ_{162} | — | September 26, 1998 | Socorro | LINEAR | · | 5.7 km | MPC · JPL |
| 101330 | 1998 SS_{163} | — | September 18, 1998 | La Silla | E. W. Elst | EUN | 3.0 km | MPC · JPL |
| 101331 Sjöström | 1998 SA_{164} | Sjöström | September 18, 1998 | La Silla | E. W. Elst | H | 1.4 km | MPC · JPL |
| 101332 | 1998 SB_{168} | — | September 19, 1998 | Anderson Mesa | LONEOS | · | 2.2 km | MPC · JPL |
| 101333 | 1998 SC_{168} | — | September 16, 1998 | Anderson Mesa | LONEOS | · | 3.5 km | MPC · JPL |
| 101334 | 1998 SE_{169} | — | September 22, 1998 | Anderson Mesa | LONEOS | · | 1.3 km | MPC · JPL |
| 101335 | 1998 SK_{171} | — | September 18, 1998 | Caussols | ODAS | · | 1.8 km | MPC · JPL |
| 101336 | 1998 TN_{1} | — | October 12, 1998 | Kitt Peak | Spacewatch | · | 4.2 km | MPC · JPL |
| 101337 | 1998 TD_{2} | — | October 12, 1998 | Caussols | ODAS | EOS | 3.2 km | MPC · JPL |
| 101338 | 1998 TM_{2} | — | October 13, 1998 | Caussols | ODAS | · | 4.0 km | MPC · JPL |
| 101339 | 1998 TS_{2} | — | October 13, 1998 | Caussols | ODAS | · | 2.3 km | MPC · JPL |
| 101340 | 1998 TN_{4} | — | October 13, 1998 | Kitt Peak | Spacewatch | KOR | 2.5 km | MPC · JPL |
| 101341 | 1998 TA_{7} | — | October 12, 1998 | Caussols | ODAS | · | 2.5 km | MPC · JPL |
| 101342 | 1998 TA_{10} | — | October 12, 1998 | Kitt Peak | Spacewatch | · | 3.9 km | MPC · JPL |
| 101343 | 1998 TL_{10} | — | October 12, 1998 | Kitt Peak | Spacewatch | · | 1.9 km | MPC · JPL |
| 101344 | 1998 TG_{12} | — | October 13, 1998 | Kitt Peak | Spacewatch | · | 3.4 km | MPC · JPL |
| 101345 | 1998 TQ_{12} | — | October 13, 1998 | Kitt Peak | Spacewatch | · | 2.3 km | MPC · JPL |
| 101346 | 1998 TY_{15} | — | October 15, 1998 | Caussols | ODAS | · | 8.5 km | MPC · JPL |
| 101347 | 1998 TZ_{15} | — | October 15, 1998 | Caussols | ODAS | · | 2.7 km | MPC · JPL |
| 101348 | 1998 TG_{17} | — | October 14, 1998 | Caussols | ODAS | · | 3.3 km | MPC · JPL |
| 101349 | 1998 TA_{19} | — | October 14, 1998 | Xinglong | SCAP | NYS | 2.0 km | MPC · JPL |
| 101350 | 1998 TE_{20} | — | October 13, 1998 | Kitt Peak | Spacewatch | · | 4.3 km | MPC · JPL |
| 101351 | 1998 TM_{29} | — | October 15, 1998 | Kitt Peak | Spacewatch | THM | 4.0 km | MPC · JPL |
| 101352 | 1998 TT_{33} | — | October 14, 1998 | Anderson Mesa | LONEOS | · | 1.9 km | MPC · JPL |
| 101353 | 1998 TC_{34} | — | October 14, 1998 | Anderson Mesa | LONEOS | · | 2.1 km | MPC · JPL |
| 101354 | 1998 TB_{35} | — | October 14, 1998 | Anderson Mesa | LONEOS | (5) | 2.7 km | MPC · JPL |
| 101355 | 1998 TS_{35} | — | October 15, 1998 | Caussols | ODAS | NYS | 2.3 km | MPC · JPL |
| 101356 | 1998 TD_{36} | — | October 15, 1998 | Xinglong | SCAP | KOR | 2.2 km | MPC · JPL |
| 101357 | 1998 TL_{37} | — | October 14, 1998 | Anderson Mesa | LONEOS | EUN | 1.7 km | MPC · JPL |
| 101358 | 1998 TQ_{37} | — | October 10, 1998 | Anderson Mesa | LONEOS | · | 2.4 km | MPC · JPL |
| 101359 | 1998 TD_{38} | — | October 14, 1998 | Anderson Mesa | LONEOS | · | 2.3 km | MPC · JPL |
| 101360 | 1998 UH | — | October 17, 1998 | Catalina | CSS | T_{j} (2.97) | 9.0 km | MPC · JPL |
| 101361 | 1998 UJ | — | October 17, 1998 | Catalina | CSS | PHO | 2.2 km | MPC · JPL |
| 101362 | 1998 UP | — | October 17, 1998 | Prescott | P. G. Comba | · | 1.8 km | MPC · JPL |
| 101363 | 1998 UQ | — | October 16, 1998 | Socorro | LINEAR | · | 2.5 km | MPC · JPL |
| 101364 | 1998 US | — | October 18, 1998 | Prescott | P. G. Comba | slow | 3.3 km | MPC · JPL |
| 101365 | 1998 UT | — | October 16, 1998 | Catalina | CSS | H | 1.3 km | MPC · JPL |
| 101366 | 1998 UY | — | October 17, 1998 | Kitt Peak | Spacewatch | · | 5.3 km | MPC · JPL |
| 101367 | 1998 UB_{1} | — | October 16, 1998 | Ondřejov | P. Pravec | · | 4.8 km | MPC · JPL |
| 101368 | 1998 UW_{2} | — | October 20, 1998 | Caussols | ODAS | · | 1.8 km | MPC · JPL |
| 101369 | 1998 UY_{3} | — | October 20, 1998 | Caussols | ODAS | · | 3.1 km | MPC · JPL |
| 101370 | 1998 UM_{4} | — | October 20, 1998 | Caussols | ODAS | · | 2.4 km | MPC · JPL |
| 101371 | 1998 UT_{5} | — | October 22, 1998 | Caussols | ODAS | NYS | 1.4 km | MPC · JPL |
| 101372 | 1998 UD_{6} | — | October 22, 1998 | Caussols | ODAS | · | 3.4 km | MPC · JPL |
| 101373 | 1998 UV_{8} | — | October 17, 1998 | Xinglong | SCAP | NYS | 1.3 km | MPC · JPL |
| 101374 | 1998 UT_{9} | — | October 16, 1998 | Kitt Peak | Spacewatch | fast | 2.9 km | MPC · JPL |
| 101375 | 1998 UA_{10} | — | October 16, 1998 | Kitt Peak | Spacewatch | · | 2.3 km | MPC · JPL |
| 101376 | 1998 UY_{10} | — | October 17, 1998 | Kitt Peak | Spacewatch | GEF | 1.9 km | MPC · JPL |
| 101377 | 1998 UB_{12} | — | October 17, 1998 | Kitt Peak | Spacewatch | · | 2.5 km | MPC · JPL |
| 101378 | 1998 UP_{12} | — | October 18, 1998 | Kitt Peak | Spacewatch | · | 2.1 km | MPC · JPL |
| 101379 | 1998 UE_{16} | — | October 23, 1998 | Caussols | ODAS | · | 1.4 km | MPC · JPL |
| 101380 | 1998 UT_{17} | — | October 18, 1998 | Xinglong | SCAP | NYS | 2.0 km | MPC · JPL |
| 101381 | 1998 UU_{19} | — | October 28, 1998 | Socorro | LINEAR | · | 2.3 km | MPC · JPL |
| 101382 | 1998 UN_{21} | — | October 28, 1998 | Socorro | LINEAR | V | 1.4 km | MPC · JPL |
| 101383 Karloff | 1998 UK_{23} | Karloff | October 30, 1998 | Goodricke-Pigott | R. A. Tucker | PHO | 2.0 km | MPC · JPL |
| 101384 | 1998 UW_{23} | — | October 17, 1998 | Anderson Mesa | LONEOS | · | 2.3 km | MPC · JPL |
| 101385 | 1998 UB_{24} | — | October 17, 1998 | Anderson Mesa | LONEOS | · | 1.7 km | MPC · JPL |
| 101386 | 1998 UW_{26} | — | October 18, 1998 | La Silla | E. W. Elst | (5) | 2.1 km | MPC · JPL |
| 101387 | 1998 UE_{28} | — | October 29, 1998 | Socorro | LINEAR | · | 4.3 km | MPC · JPL |
| 101388 | 1998 UA_{31} | — | October 29, 1998 | Catalina | CSS | PHO | 2.4 km | MPC · JPL |
| 101389 | 1998 UQ_{33} | — | October 28, 1998 | Socorro | LINEAR | · | 2.2 km | MPC · JPL |
| 101390 | 1998 UV_{33} | — | October 28, 1998 | Socorro | LINEAR | V | 2.0 km | MPC · JPL |
| 101391 | 1998 UM_{34} | — | October 28, 1998 | Socorro | LINEAR | · | 3.2 km | MPC · JPL |
| 101392 | 1998 UW_{34} | — | October 28, 1998 | Socorro | LINEAR | · | 2.3 km | MPC · JPL |
| 101393 | 1998 UD_{36} | — | October 28, 1998 | Socorro | LINEAR | · | 1.8 km | MPC · JPL |
| 101394 | 1998 UL_{38} | — | October 28, 1998 | Socorro | LINEAR | · | 2.7 km | MPC · JPL |
| 101395 | 1998 UB_{39} | — | October 28, 1998 | Socorro | LINEAR | · | 2.1 km | MPC · JPL |
| 101396 | 1998 UE_{39} | — | October 28, 1998 | Socorro | LINEAR | · | 1.6 km | MPC · JPL |
| 101397 | 1998 UG_{39} | — | October 28, 1998 | Socorro | LINEAR | NYS | 1.6 km | MPC · JPL |
| 101398 | 1998 UR_{39} | — | October 28, 1998 | Socorro | LINEAR | (5) | 2.7 km | MPC · JPL |
| 101399 | 1998 UV_{39} | — | October 28, 1998 | Socorro | LINEAR | · | 6.5 km | MPC · JPL |
| 101400 | 1998 UQ_{41} | — | October 28, 1998 | Socorro | LINEAR | · | 1.8 km | MPC · JPL |

== 101401–101500 ==
back to top

| Designation | | | Discovery | | | Properties | | Ref |
| Permanent | Provisional | Named after | Date | Site | Discoverer(s) | Category | Diam. | Ref |
|---|---|---|---|---|---|---|---|---|
| 101401 | 1998 VD | — | November 7, 1998 | Gekko | T. Kagawa | NYS | 1.7 km | MPC · JPL |
| 101402 | 1998 VG_{1} | — | November 10, 1998 | Socorro | LINEAR | · | 1.9 km | MPC · JPL |
| 101403 | 1998 VS_{2} | — | November 10, 1998 | Caussols | ODAS | AGN | 2.1 km | MPC · JPL |
| 101404 | 1998 VY_{2} | — | November 10, 1998 | Caussols | ODAS | · | 5.3 km | MPC · JPL |
| 101405 | 1998 VJ_{3} | — | November 10, 1998 | Caussols | ODAS | L4 · ERY | 10 km | MPC · JPL |
| 101406 | 1998 VL_{3} | — | November 10, 1998 | Caussols | ODAS | · | 2.8 km | MPC · JPL |
| 101407 | 1998 VQ_{3} | — | November 10, 1998 | Caussols | ODAS | · | 2.9 km | MPC · JPL |
| 101408 | 1998 VC_{6} | — | November 11, 1998 | Gekko | T. Kagawa | NYS | 2.4 km | MPC · JPL |
| 101409 | 1998 VQ_{6} | — | November 11, 1998 | Nachi-Katsuura | Y. Shimizu, T. Urata | · | 2.1 km | MPC · JPL |
| 101410 | 1998 VZ_{6} | — | November 12, 1998 | Ondřejov | P. Pravec | NYS | 1.4 km | MPC · JPL |
| 101411 | 1998 VO_{7} | — | November 10, 1998 | Socorro | LINEAR | · | 1.7 km | MPC · JPL |
| 101412 | 1998 VS_{7} | — | November 10, 1998 | Socorro | LINEAR | · | 7.0 km | MPC · JPL |
| 101413 | 1998 VG_{9} | — | November 10, 1998 | Socorro | LINEAR | ERI | 3.2 km | MPC · JPL |
| 101414 | 1998 VJ_{9} | — | November 10, 1998 | Socorro | LINEAR | · | 1.7 km | MPC · JPL |
| 101415 | 1998 VB_{12} | — | November 10, 1998 | Socorro | LINEAR | · | 1.3 km | MPC · JPL |
| 101416 | 1998 VN_{12} | — | November 10, 1998 | Socorro | LINEAR | · | 3.3 km | MPC · JPL |
| 101417 | 1998 VG_{13} | — | November 10, 1998 | Socorro | LINEAR | · | 2.1 km | MPC · JPL |
| 101418 | 1998 VW_{15} | — | November 10, 1998 | Socorro | LINEAR | · | 1.8 km | MPC · JPL |
| 101419 | 1998 VV_{16} | — | November 10, 1998 | Socorro | LINEAR | (5) | 2.2 km | MPC · JPL |
| 101420 | 1998 VE_{17} | — | November 10, 1998 | Socorro | LINEAR | · | 2.0 km | MPC · JPL |
| 101421 | 1998 VS_{17} | — | November 10, 1998 | Socorro | LINEAR | slow | 3.9 km | MPC · JPL |
| 101422 | 1998 VV_{18} | — | November 10, 1998 | Socorro | LINEAR | · | 2.1 km | MPC · JPL |
| 101423 | 1998 VA_{19} | — | November 10, 1998 | Socorro | LINEAR | · | 1.9 km | MPC · JPL |
| 101424 | 1998 VA_{20} | — | November 10, 1998 | Socorro | LINEAR | · | 3.4 km | MPC · JPL |
| 101425 | 1998 VH_{20} | — | November 10, 1998 | Socorro | LINEAR | · | 2.5 km | MPC · JPL |
| 101426 | 1998 VZ_{20} | — | November 10, 1998 | Socorro | LINEAR | · | 2.5 km | MPC · JPL |
| 101427 | 1998 VA_{25} | — | November 10, 1998 | Socorro | LINEAR | · | 2.6 km | MPC · JPL |
| 101428 | 1998 VE_{30} | — | November 10, 1998 | Socorro | LINEAR | · | 2.9 km | MPC · JPL |
| 101429 | 1998 VF_{31} | — | November 13, 1998 | Socorro | LINEAR | · | 1.0 km | MPC · JPL |
| 101430 | 1998 VE_{32} | — | November 14, 1998 | Socorro | LINEAR | · | 2.2 km | MPC · JPL |
| 101431 | 1998 VX_{32} | — | November 11, 1998 | Chichibu | N. Satō | · | 2.6 km | MPC · JPL |
| 101432 Adamwest | 1998 VG_{33} | Adamwest | November 14, 1998 | Goodricke-Pigott | R. A. Tucker | · | 2.5 km | MPC · JPL |
| 101433 | 1998 VR_{33} | — | November 11, 1998 | Socorro | LINEAR | HNS | 2.4 km | MPC · JPL |
| 101434 | 1998 VU_{33} | — | November 10, 1998 | Caussols | ODAS | · | 4.0 km | MPC · JPL |
| 101435 | 1998 VC_{36} | — | November 14, 1998 | Socorro | LINEAR | · | 2.0 km | MPC · JPL |
| 101436 | 1998 VF_{36} | — | November 14, 1998 | Socorro | LINEAR | NYS | 2.0 km | MPC · JPL |
| 101437 | 1998 VL_{38} | — | November 10, 1998 | Socorro | LINEAR | · | 2.8 km | MPC · JPL |
| 101438 | 1998 VE_{39} | — | November 11, 1998 | Socorro | LINEAR | ERI | 4.2 km | MPC · JPL |
| 101439 | 1998 VH_{39} | — | November 11, 1998 | Socorro | LINEAR | · | 2.4 km | MPC · JPL |
| 101440 | 1998 VO_{41} | — | November 14, 1998 | Kitt Peak | Spacewatch | NYS | 1.8 km | MPC · JPL |
| 101441 | 1998 VB_{42} | — | November 15, 1998 | Kitt Peak | Spacewatch | NYS | 1.8 km | MPC · JPL |
| 101442 | 1998 VP_{42} | — | November 15, 1998 | Kitt Peak | Spacewatch | MRX | 1.4 km | MPC · JPL |
| 101443 | 1998 VA_{43} | — | November 15, 1998 | Kitt Peak | Spacewatch | EUN | 2.6 km | MPC · JPL |
| 101444 | 1998 VS_{43} | — | November 15, 1998 | Kitt Peak | Spacewatch | · | 2.1 km | MPC · JPL |
| 101445 | 1998 VG_{47} | — | November 14, 1998 | Kitt Peak | Spacewatch | · | 3.3 km | MPC · JPL |
| 101446 | 1998 VY_{47} | — | November 15, 1998 | Kitt Peak | Spacewatch | · | 4.0 km | MPC · JPL |
| 101447 | 1998 VY_{50} | — | November 11, 1998 | Socorro | LINEAR | PHO | 2.6 km | MPC · JPL |
| 101448 | 1998 VF_{54} | — | November 14, 1998 | Socorro | LINEAR | · | 2.0 km | MPC · JPL |
| 101449 | 1998 VQ_{55} | — | November 15, 1998 | Haleakala | NEAT | · | 1.9 km | MPC · JPL |
| 101450 | 1998 VN_{56} | — | November 15, 1998 | Anderson Mesa | LONEOS | NYS · | 3.3 km | MPC · JPL |
| 101451 | 1998 VW_{56} | — | November 14, 1998 | Socorro | LINEAR | · | 4.8 km | MPC · JPL |
| 101452 | 1998 WS_{1} | — | November 18, 1998 | Oizumi | T. Kobayashi | · | 2.5 km | MPC · JPL |
| 101453 | 1998 WN_{2} | — | November 19, 1998 | Caussols | ODAS | EUN | 3.6 km | MPC · JPL |
| 101454 | 1998 WZ_{2} | — | November 17, 1998 | Caussols | ODAS | NYS | 2.9 km | MPC · JPL |
| 101455 | 1998 WN_{4} | — | November 17, 1998 | Catalina | CSS | H | 1.4 km | MPC · JPL |
| 101456 | 1998 WY_{4} | — | November 19, 1998 | Catalina | CSS | · | 7.4 km | MPC · JPL |
| 101457 | 1998 WF_{6} | — | November 21, 1998 | Socorro | LINEAR | PHO | 2.7 km | MPC · JPL |
| 101458 | 1998 WJ_{6} | — | November 22, 1998 | Les Tardieux Obs. | Boeuf, M. | · | 4.0 km | MPC · JPL |
| 101459 | 1998 WD_{7} | — | November 19, 1998 | Uenohara | N. Kawasato | · | 2.0 km | MPC · JPL |
| 101460 | 1998 WH_{7} | — | November 23, 1998 | Gekko | T. Kagawa | V | 1.2 km | MPC · JPL |
| 101461 Dunedin | 1998 WU_{7} | Dunedin | November 25, 1998 | Cocoa | I. P. Griffin | · | 2.6 km | MPC · JPL |
| 101462 Tahupotiki | 1998 WW_{7} | Tahupotiki | November 25, 1998 | Cocoa | I. P. Griffin | · | 2.1 km | MPC · JPL |
| 101463 | 1998 WM_{11} | — | November 21, 1998 | Socorro | LINEAR | · | 1.9 km | MPC · JPL |
| 101464 | 1998 WS_{11} | — | November 21, 1998 | Socorro | LINEAR | · | 4.5 km | MPC · JPL |
| 101465 | 1998 WL_{12} | — | November 21, 1998 | Socorro | LINEAR | slow | 1.5 km | MPC · JPL |
| 101466 | 1998 WJ_{15} | — | November 21, 1998 | Socorro | LINEAR | L4 | 20 km | MPC · JPL |
| 101467 | 1998 WG_{16} | — | November 21, 1998 | Socorro | LINEAR | · | 3.3 km | MPC · JPL |
| 101468 | 1998 WJ_{16} | — | November 21, 1998 | Socorro | LINEAR | (5) | 2.1 km | MPC · JPL |
| 101469 | 1998 WU_{16} | — | November 21, 1998 | Socorro | LINEAR | · | 3.6 km | MPC · JPL |
| 101470 | 1998 WV_{16} | — | November 21, 1998 | Socorro | LINEAR | · | 3.3 km | MPC · JPL |
| 101471 | 1998 WX_{16} | — | November 21, 1998 | Socorro | LINEAR | · | 2.9 km | MPC · JPL |
| 101472 | 1998 WL_{18} | — | November 21, 1998 | Socorro | LINEAR | · | 3.6 km | MPC · JPL |
| 101473 | 1998 WM_{20} | — | November 18, 1998 | Socorro | LINEAR | EUN | 3.1 km | MPC · JPL |
| 101474 | 1998 WQ_{21} | — | November 18, 1998 | Socorro | LINEAR | · | 3.8 km | MPC · JPL |
| 101475 | 1998 WF_{22} | — | November 18, 1998 | Socorro | LINEAR | NYS | 2.4 km | MPC · JPL |
| 101476 | 1998 WY_{22} | — | November 18, 1998 | Socorro | LINEAR | · | 1.9 km | MPC · JPL |
| 101477 | 1998 WO_{25} | — | November 16, 1998 | Kitt Peak | Spacewatch | · | 5.9 km | MPC · JPL |
| 101478 | 1998 WN_{27} | — | November 18, 1998 | Kitt Peak | Spacewatch | · | 2.5 km | MPC · JPL |
| 101479 | 1998 WC_{29} | — | November 23, 1998 | Kitt Peak | Spacewatch | · | 2.3 km | MPC · JPL |
| 101480 | 1998 WH_{32} | — | November 20, 1998 | Anderson Mesa | LONEOS | EUN | 2.4 km | MPC · JPL |
| 101481 | 1998 WN_{33} | — | November 23, 1998 | Anderson Mesa | LONEOS | NYS | 2.8 km | MPC · JPL |
| 101482 | 1998 WT_{33} | — | November 23, 1998 | Anderson Mesa | LONEOS | · | 5.4 km | MPC · JPL |
| 101483 | 1998 WQ_{34} | — | November 17, 1998 | Kitt Peak | Spacewatch | · | 5.7 km | MPC · JPL |
| 101484 | 1998 WF_{35} | — | November 18, 1998 | Kitt Peak | Spacewatch | · | 2.7 km | MPC · JPL |
| 101485 | 1998 WH_{36} | — | November 19, 1998 | Kitt Peak | Spacewatch | · | 2.1 km | MPC · JPL |
| 101486 | 1998 WJ_{38} | — | November 21, 1998 | Kitt Peak | Spacewatch | · | 6.5 km | MPC · JPL |
| 101487 | 1998 WB_{40} | — | November 22, 1998 | Kitt Peak | Spacewatch | · | 2.4 km | MPC · JPL |
| 101488 | 1998 WM_{42} | — | November 19, 1998 | Caussols | ODAS | · | 4.7 km | MPC · JPL |
| 101489 | 1998 WW_{43} | — | November 20, 1998 | Anderson Mesa | LONEOS | · | 3.2 km | MPC · JPL |
| 101490 | 1998 WX_{43} | — | November 20, 1998 | Anderson Mesa | LONEOS | NYS | 2.6 km | MPC · JPL |
| 101491 Grahamcrombie | 1998 XA | Grahamcrombie | December 1, 1998 | Cocoa | I. P. Griffin | · | 3.3 km | MPC · JPL |
| 101492 | 1998 XT_{1} | — | December 7, 1998 | Caussols | ODAS | L4 | 21 km | MPC · JPL |
| 101493 Sergiofoparri | 1998 XB_{3} | Sergiofoparri | December 7, 1998 | San Marcello | G. Forti, M. Tombelli | · | 2.0 km | MPC · JPL |
| 101494 | 1998 XD_{3} | — | December 8, 1998 | Woomera | F. B. Zoltowski | · | 2.1 km | MPC · JPL |
| 101495 | 1998 XJ_{3} | — | December 10, 1998 | Ondřejov | L. Kotková | · | 3.5 km | MPC · JPL |
| 101496 | 1998 XM_{3} | — | December 9, 1998 | Nachi-Katsuura | Y. Shimizu, T. Urata | · | 2.2 km | MPC · JPL |
| 101497 | 1998 XB_{6} | — | December 8, 1998 | Kitt Peak | Spacewatch | · | 2.7 km | MPC · JPL |
| 101498 | 1998 XC_{7} | — | December 8, 1998 | Kitt Peak | Spacewatch | · | 3.7 km | MPC · JPL |
| 101499 | 1998 XS_{7} | — | December 9, 1998 | Kitt Peak | Spacewatch | · | 3.0 km | MPC · JPL |
| 101500 | 1998 XP_{8} | — | December 12, 1998 | Kitt Peak | Spacewatch | · | 3.8 km | MPC · JPL |

== 101501–101600 ==
back to top

| Designation | | | Discovery | | | Properties | | Ref |
| Permanent | Provisional | Named after | Date | Site | Discoverer(s) | Category | Diam. | Ref |
|---|---|---|---|---|---|---|---|---|
| 101501 | 1998 XR_{8} | — | December 12, 1998 | Kitt Peak | Spacewatch | · | 1.4 km | MPC · JPL |
| 101502 | 1998 XZ_{9} | — | December 7, 1998 | Caussols | ODAS | NYS | 2.9 km | MPC · JPL |
| 101503 | 1998 XL_{10} | — | December 8, 1998 | Caussols | ODAS | ADE | 6.0 km | MPC · JPL |
| 101504 | 1998 XK_{13} | — | December 15, 1998 | Caussols | ODAS | · | 1.6 km | MPC · JPL |
| 101505 | 1998 XM_{16} | — | December 14, 1998 | Socorro | LINEAR | · | 4.1 km | MPC · JPL |
| 101506 | 1998 XP_{17} | — | December 13, 1998 | Rand | G. R. Viscome | · | 1.9 km | MPC · JPL |
| 101507 | 1998 XG_{18} | — | December 8, 1998 | Kitt Peak | Spacewatch | HOF | 4.4 km | MPC · JPL |
| 101508 | 1998 XB_{20} | — | December 10, 1998 | Kitt Peak | Spacewatch | · | 2.7 km | MPC · JPL |
| 101509 | 1998 XN_{20} | — | December 10, 1998 | Kitt Peak | Spacewatch | · | 3.7 km | MPC · JPL |
| 101510 | 1998 XH_{22} | — | December 11, 1998 | Kitt Peak | Spacewatch | · | 3.3 km | MPC · JPL |
| 101511 | 1998 XH_{23} | — | December 11, 1998 | Kitt Peak | Spacewatch | · | 3.6 km | MPC · JPL |
| 101512 | 1998 XU_{25} | — | December 14, 1998 | Kitt Peak | Spacewatch | · | 3.3 km | MPC · JPL |
| 101513 | 1998 XV_{25} | — | December 14, 1998 | Kitt Peak | Spacewatch | · | 2.8 km | MPC · JPL |
| 101514 | 1998 XK_{26} | — | December 15, 1998 | Socorro | LINEAR | H | 1.3 km | MPC · JPL |
| 101515 | 1998 XG_{27} | — | December 15, 1998 | Socorro | LINEAR | (10369) | 6.7 km | MPC · JPL |
| 101516 | 1998 XW_{28} | — | December 14, 1998 | Socorro | LINEAR | · | 5.4 km | MPC · JPL |
| 101517 | 1998 XT_{42} | — | December 14, 1998 | Socorro | LINEAR | · | 3.0 km | MPC · JPL |
| 101518 | 1998 XF_{45} | — | December 14, 1998 | Socorro | LINEAR | · | 5.7 km | MPC · JPL |
| 101519 | 1998 XP_{50} | — | December 14, 1998 | Socorro | LINEAR | · | 5.1 km | MPC · JPL |
| 101520 | 1998 XA_{52} | — | December 14, 1998 | Socorro | LINEAR | · | 4.5 km | MPC · JPL |
| 101521 | 1998 XU_{58} | — | December 15, 1998 | Socorro | LINEAR | · | 3.2 km | MPC · JPL |
| 101522 | 1998 XJ_{63} | — | December 14, 1998 | Socorro | LINEAR | · | 2.2 km | MPC · JPL |
| 101523 | 1998 XD_{65} | — | December 14, 1998 | Socorro | LINEAR | · | 3.5 km | MPC · JPL |
| 101524 | 1998 XK_{65} | — | December 14, 1998 | Socorro | LINEAR | NYS | 3.1 km | MPC · JPL |
| 101525 | 1998 XM_{65} | — | December 14, 1998 | Socorro | LINEAR | RAF | 2.6 km | MPC · JPL |
| 101526 | 1998 XB_{66} | — | December 14, 1998 | Socorro | LINEAR | MAS | 1.4 km | MPC · JPL |
| 101527 | 1998 XM_{76} | — | December 15, 1998 | Socorro | LINEAR | ADE | 6.0 km | MPC · JPL |
| 101528 | 1998 XS_{83} | — | December 15, 1998 | Socorro | LINEAR | · | 3.7 km | MPC · JPL |
| 101529 | 1998 XH_{93} | — | December 15, 1998 | Socorro | LINEAR | · | 4.7 km | MPC · JPL |
| 101530 | 1998 XO_{97} | — | December 8, 1998 | Anderson Mesa | LONEOS | NYS | 2.3 km | MPC · JPL |
| 101531 | 1998 XT_{97} | — | December 11, 1998 | Anderson Mesa | LONEOS | NYS | 1.8 km | MPC · JPL |
| 101532 | 1998 XS_{99} | — | December 11, 1998 | Anderson Mesa | LONEOS | NYS · | 3.2 km | MPC · JPL |
| 101533 | 1998 YK_{9} | — | December 26, 1998 | Prescott | P. G. Comba | · | 4.0 km | MPC · JPL |
| 101534 Carlobenna | 1998 YC_{10} | Carlobenna | December 25, 1998 | San Marcello | L. Tesi, A. Boattini | · | 6.8 km | MPC · JPL |
| 101535 | 1998 YQ_{13} | — | December 19, 1998 | Kitt Peak | Spacewatch | · | 2.3 km | MPC · JPL |
| 101536 | 1998 YE_{14} | — | December 19, 1998 | Kitt Peak | Spacewatch | NYS | 2.1 km | MPC · JPL |
| 101537 | 1998 YX_{14} | — | December 22, 1998 | Kitt Peak | Spacewatch | KON | 4.6 km | MPC · JPL |
| 101538 | 1998 YO_{15} | — | December 22, 1998 | Kitt Peak | Spacewatch | · | 4.6 km | MPC · JPL |
| 101539 | 1998 YE_{16} | — | December 22, 1998 | Kitt Peak | Spacewatch | · | 2.1 km | MPC · JPL |
| 101540 | 1998 YO_{16} | — | December 22, 1998 | Kitt Peak | Spacewatch | · | 1.6 km | MPC · JPL |
| 101541 | 1998 YM_{17} | — | December 22, 1998 | Kitt Peak | Spacewatch | · | 2.0 km | MPC · JPL |
| 101542 | 1998 YK_{18} | — | December 25, 1998 | Kitt Peak | Spacewatch | NYS | 2.6 km | MPC · JPL |
| 101543 | 1998 YK_{21} | — | December 26, 1998 | Kitt Peak | Spacewatch | THM | 4.6 km | MPC · JPL |
| 101544 | 1998 YS_{21} | — | December 26, 1998 | Kitt Peak | Spacewatch | · | 5.9 km | MPC · JPL |
| 101545 | 1998 YH_{23} | — | December 16, 1998 | Socorro | LINEAR | · | 1.7 km | MPC · JPL |
| 101546 | 1998 YZ_{26} | — | December 16, 1998 | Socorro | LINEAR | · | 4.9 km | MPC · JPL |
| 101547 | 1998 YM_{27} | — | December 27, 1998 | Anderson Mesa | LONEOS | TIR | 4.0 km | MPC · JPL |
| 101548 | 1998 YS_{29} | — | December 27, 1998 | Anderson Mesa | LONEOS | · | 2.6 km | MPC · JPL |
| 101549 | 1998 YY_{29} | — | December 27, 1998 | Anderson Mesa | LONEOS | H | 2.2 km | MPC · JPL |
| 101550 | 1999 AE | — | January 5, 1999 | Višnjan Observatory | K. Korlević | · | 4.4 km | MPC · JPL |
| 101551 | 1999 AH_{1} | — | January 7, 1999 | Kitt Peak | Spacewatch | · | 1.8 km | MPC · JPL |
| 101552 | 1999 AP_{1} | — | January 7, 1999 | Kitt Peak | Spacewatch | · | 2.7 km | MPC · JPL |
| 101553 | 1999 AB_{4} | — | January 10, 1999 | Oizumi | T. Kobayashi | H | 1.1 km | MPC · JPL |
| 101554 | 1999 AL_{4} | — | January 9, 1999 | Socorro | LINEAR | · | 2.4 km | MPC · JPL |
| 101555 | 1999 AO_{5} | — | January 12, 1999 | Oizumi | T. Kobayashi | EUN | 3.1 km | MPC · JPL |
| 101556 | 1999 AW_{5} | — | January 12, 1999 | Oizumi | T. Kobayashi | · | 2.8 km | MPC · JPL |
| 101557 | 1999 AW_{6} | — | January 9, 1999 | Višnjan Observatory | K. Korlević | · | 2.7 km | MPC · JPL |
| 101558 | 1999 AE_{8} | — | January 13, 1999 | Oizumi | T. Kobayashi | · | 9.4 km | MPC · JPL |
| 101559 | 1999 AJ_{9} | — | January 9, 1999 | Xinglong | SCAP | · | 5.4 km | MPC · JPL |
| 101560 | 1999 AA_{12} | — | January 7, 1999 | Kitt Peak | Spacewatch | · | 3.6 km | MPC · JPL |
| 101561 | 1999 AA_{14} | — | January 8, 1999 | Kitt Peak | Spacewatch | · | 2.8 km | MPC · JPL |
| 101562 | 1999 AD_{14} | — | January 8, 1999 | Kitt Peak | Spacewatch | · | 3.6 km | MPC · JPL |
| 101563 | 1999 AK_{15} | — | January 9, 1999 | Kitt Peak | Spacewatch | · | 3.7 km | MPC · JPL |
| 101564 | 1999 AV_{17} | — | January 11, 1999 | Kitt Peak | Spacewatch | NEM | 4.1 km | MPC · JPL |
| 101565 | 1999 AD_{21} | — | January 13, 1999 | Gekko | T. Kagawa | SUL | 5.7 km | MPC · JPL |
| 101566 | 1999 AO_{21} | — | January 14, 1999 | Višnjan Observatory | K. Korlević | · | 3.5 km | MPC · JPL |
| 101567 | 1999 AW_{22} | — | January 15, 1999 | Catalina | CSS | · | 8.2 km | MPC · JPL |
| 101568 | 1999 AK_{30} | — | January 14, 1999 | Kitt Peak | Spacewatch | · | 2.5 km | MPC · JPL |
| 101569 | 1999 AH_{31} | — | January 14, 1999 | Kitt Peak | Spacewatch | · | 1.7 km | MPC · JPL |
| 101570 | 1999 AJ_{38} | — | January 14, 1999 | Socorro | LINEAR | · | 4.3 km | MPC · JPL |
| 101571 | 1999 AF_{39} | — | January 9, 1999 | Anderson Mesa | LONEOS | · | 2.2 km | MPC · JPL |
| 101572 | 1999 BF | — | January 16, 1999 | Oizumi | T. Kobayashi | · | 2.8 km | MPC · JPL |
| 101573 | 1999 BQ | — | January 16, 1999 | Višnjan Observatory | K. Korlević | · | 3.7 km | MPC · JPL |
| 101574 | 1999 BA_{1} | — | January 17, 1999 | Catalina | CSS | · | 11 km | MPC · JPL |
| 101575 | 1999 BD_{2} | — | January 18, 1999 | Catalina | CSS | · | 2.2 km | MPC · JPL |
| 101576 | 1999 BM_{2} | — | January 19, 1999 | Caussols | ODAS | · | 2.6 km | MPC · JPL |
| 101577 | 1999 BV_{2} | — | January 18, 1999 | Oizumi | T. Kobayashi | · | 3.7 km | MPC · JPL |
| 101578 | 1999 BM_{3} | — | January 20, 1999 | Kleť | Kleť | · | 2.1 km | MPC · JPL |
| 101579 | 1999 BR_{4} | — | January 19, 1999 | Caussols | ODAS | · | 2.9 km | MPC · JPL |
| 101580 | 1999 BZ_{5} | — | January 21, 1999 | Višnjan Observatory | K. Korlević | (5) | 2.4 km | MPC · JPL |
| 101581 | 1999 BY_{7} | — | January 21, 1999 | Višnjan Observatory | K. Korlević | · | 5.8 km | MPC · JPL |
| 101582 | 1999 BZ_{8} | — | January 22, 1999 | Višnjan Observatory | K. Korlević | · | 3.4 km | MPC · JPL |
| 101583 | 1999 BF_{10} | — | January 23, 1999 | Višnjan Observatory | K. Korlević | · | 3.5 km | MPC · JPL |
| 101584 | 1999 BP_{10} | — | January 19, 1999 | Caussols | ODAS | · | 1.6 km | MPC · JPL |
| 101585 | 1999 BL_{11} | — | January 20, 1999 | Caussols | ODAS | · | 3.3 km | MPC · JPL |
| 101586 | 1999 BN_{11} | — | January 20, 1999 | Caussols | ODAS | H | 910 m | MPC · JPL |
| 101587 | 1999 BE_{12} | — | January 22, 1999 | Oizumi | T. Kobayashi | · | 3.5 km | MPC · JPL |
| 101588 | 1999 BH_{12} | — | January 24, 1999 | Monte Agliale | Santangelo, M. M. M., Cavalletti, G. | · | 7.9 km | MPC · JPL |
| 101589 | 1999 BP_{14} | — | January 16, 1999 | Višnjan Observatory | K. Korlević | V | 1.4 km | MPC · JPL |
| 101590 | 1999 BU_{20} | — | January 16, 1999 | Socorro | LINEAR | · | 3.4 km | MPC · JPL |
| 101591 | 1999 BB_{21} | — | January 16, 1999 | Socorro | LINEAR | (2076) | 2.3 km | MPC · JPL |
| 101592 | 1999 BN_{24} | — | January 18, 1999 | Socorro | LINEAR | · | 2.4 km | MPC · JPL |
| 101593 | 1999 BU_{25} | — | January 18, 1999 | Socorro | LINEAR | · | 3.1 km | MPC · JPL |
| 101594 | 1999 BE_{26} | — | January 26, 1999 | Višnjan Observatory | K. Korlević | · | 2.9 km | MPC · JPL |
| 101595 | 1999 BJ_{26} | — | January 16, 1999 | Kitt Peak | Spacewatch | · | 5.1 km | MPC · JPL |
| 101596 | 1999 BR_{27} | — | January 17, 1999 | Kitt Peak | Spacewatch | · | 2.5 km | MPC · JPL |
| 101597 | 1999 BA_{30} | — | January 19, 1999 | Kitt Peak | Spacewatch | · | 4.5 km | MPC · JPL |
| 101598 | 1999 BC_{33} | — | January 22, 1999 | Kitt Peak | Spacewatch | · | 1.8 km | MPC · JPL |
| 101599 | 1999 BD_{34} | — | January 17, 1999 | Anderson Mesa | LONEOS | TIR | 4.3 km | MPC · JPL |
| 101600 | 1999 BX_{34} | — | January 20, 1999 | Catalina | CSS | EUP | 10 km | MPC · JPL |

== 101601–101700 ==
back to top

| Designation | | | Discovery | | | Properties | | Ref |
| Permanent | Provisional | Named after | Date | Site | Discoverer(s) | Category | Diam. | Ref |
|---|---|---|---|---|---|---|---|---|
| 101601 | 1999 CM | — | February 4, 1999 | Gekko | T. Kagawa | · | 6.3 km | MPC · JPL |
| 101602 | 1999 CT_{1} | — | February 7, 1999 | Oizumi | T. Kobayashi | · | 6.9 km | MPC · JPL |
| 101603 | 1999 CB_{2} | — | February 8, 1999 | Oizumi | T. Kobayashi | · | 3.1 km | MPC · JPL |
| 101604 | 1999 CR_{3} | — | February 10, 1999 | Socorro | LINEAR | H | 1.4 km | MPC · JPL |
| 101605 | 1999 CZ_{5} | — | February 10, 1999 | Socorro | LINEAR | PHO | 3.4 km | MPC · JPL |
| 101606 | 1999 CK_{6} | — | February 10, 1999 | Socorro | LINEAR | HNS | 2.1 km | MPC · JPL |
| 101607 | 1999 CN_{6} | — | February 10, 1999 | Socorro | LINEAR | · | 6.9 km | MPC · JPL |
| 101608 | 1999 CB_{7} | — | February 10, 1999 | Socorro | LINEAR | H | 1.3 km | MPC · JPL |
| 101609 | 1999 CD_{7} | — | February 10, 1999 | Socorro | LINEAR | T_{j} (2.99) · EUP | 6.9 km | MPC · JPL |
| 101610 | 1999 CW_{7} | — | February 10, 1999 | Socorro | LINEAR | · | 1.4 km | MPC · JPL |
| 101611 | 1999 CL_{8} | — | February 13, 1999 | Oizumi | T. Kobayashi | JUN | 2.5 km | MPC · JPL |
| 101612 | 1999 CS_{8} | — | February 13, 1999 | Kitt Peak | Spacewatch | L4 | 20 km | MPC · JPL |
| 101613 | 1999 CX_{8} | — | February 12, 1999 | Prescott | P. G. Comba | · | 2.5 km | MPC · JPL |
| 101614 | 1999 CY_{8} | — | February 12, 1999 | Prescott | P. G. Comba | · | 2.0 km | MPC · JPL |
| 101615 | 1999 CD_{9} | — | February 14, 1999 | Farpoint | G. Hug, G. Bell | EUN | 2.2 km | MPC · JPL |
| 101616 | 1999 CL_{9} | — | February 12, 1999 | Oohira | T. Urata | · | 4.5 km | MPC · JPL |
| 101617 | 1999 CM_{9} | — | February 13, 1999 | Oohira | T. Urata | · | 4.1 km | MPC · JPL |
| 101618 | 1999 CN_{9} | — | February 14, 1999 | Oizumi | T. Kobayashi | · | 3.1 km | MPC · JPL |
| 101619 | 1999 CG_{12} | — | February 12, 1999 | Socorro | LINEAR | PHO | 2.5 km | MPC · JPL |
| 101620 | 1999 CN_{14} | — | February 15, 1999 | Višnjan Observatory | K. Korlević | · | 3.7 km | MPC · JPL |
| 101621 | 1999 CH_{16} | — | February 15, 1999 | Kleť | Kleť | · | 2.0 km | MPC · JPL |
| 101622 | 1999 CP_{16} | — | February 15, 1999 | Višnjan Observatory | K. Korlević | MAR | 3.0 km | MPC · JPL |
| 101623 | 1999 CH_{18} | — | February 10, 1999 | Socorro | LINEAR | PHO | 5.6 km | MPC · JPL |
| 101624 | 1999 CV_{18} | — | February 10, 1999 | Socorro | LINEAR | · | 7.2 km | MPC · JPL |
| 101625 | 1999 CP_{20} | — | February 10, 1999 | Socorro | LINEAR | · | 3.4 km | MPC · JPL |
| 101626 | 1999 CN_{21} | — | February 10, 1999 | Socorro | LINEAR | · | 1.5 km | MPC · JPL |
| 101627 | 1999 CV_{21} | — | February 10, 1999 | Socorro | LINEAR | · | 8.2 km | MPC · JPL |
| 101628 | 1999 CO_{22} | — | February 10, 1999 | Socorro | LINEAR | TIR | 3.3 km | MPC · JPL |
| 101629 | 1999 CV_{24} | — | February 10, 1999 | Socorro | LINEAR | · | 2.4 km | MPC · JPL |
| 101630 | 1999 CD_{26} | — | February 10, 1999 | Socorro | LINEAR | · | 2.6 km | MPC · JPL |
| 101631 | 1999 CM_{29} | — | February 10, 1999 | Socorro | LINEAR | (5) | 2.6 km | MPC · JPL |
| 101632 | 1999 CP_{32} | — | February 10, 1999 | Socorro | LINEAR | · | 5.1 km | MPC · JPL |
| 101633 | 1999 CA_{34} | — | February 10, 1999 | Socorro | LINEAR | · | 3.1 km | MPC · JPL |
| 101634 | 1999 CN_{36} | — | February 10, 1999 | Socorro | LINEAR | T_{j} (2.98) · EUP | 7.3 km | MPC · JPL |
| 101635 | 1999 CY_{37} | — | February 10, 1999 | Socorro | LINEAR | TIR | 7.0 km | MPC · JPL |
| 101636 | 1999 CO_{42} | — | February 10, 1999 | Socorro | LINEAR | · | 6.1 km | MPC · JPL |
| 101637 | 1999 CA_{43} | — | February 10, 1999 | Socorro | LINEAR | · | 2.6 km | MPC · JPL |
| 101638 | 1999 CL_{45} | — | February 10, 1999 | Socorro | LINEAR | · | 8.1 km | MPC · JPL |
| 101639 | 1999 CP_{45} | — | February 10, 1999 | Socorro | LINEAR | (10654) | 7.9 km | MPC · JPL |
| 101640 | 1999 CG_{48} | — | February 10, 1999 | Socorro | LINEAR | EUN | 2.8 km | MPC · JPL |
| 101641 | 1999 CU_{48} | — | February 10, 1999 | Socorro | LINEAR | · | 3.4 km | MPC · JPL |
| 101642 | 1999 CK_{51} | — | February 10, 1999 | Socorro | LINEAR | · | 4.2 km | MPC · JPL |
| 101643 | 1999 CU_{51} | — | February 10, 1999 | Socorro | LINEAR | · | 8.6 km | MPC · JPL |
| 101644 | 1999 CC_{52} | — | February 10, 1999 | Socorro | LINEAR | (5) | 2.8 km | MPC · JPL |
| 101645 | 1999 CM_{56} | — | February 10, 1999 | Socorro | LINEAR | · | 2.2 km | MPC · JPL |
| 101646 | 1999 CQ_{56} | — | February 10, 1999 | Socorro | LINEAR | (5) | 3.2 km | MPC · JPL |
| 101647 | 1999 CP_{57} | — | February 10, 1999 | Socorro | LINEAR | · | 6.4 km | MPC · JPL |
| 101648 | 1999 CX_{58} | — | February 10, 1999 | Socorro | LINEAR | · | 2.4 km | MPC · JPL |
| 101649 | 1999 CO_{62} | — | February 12, 1999 | Socorro | LINEAR | TIR | 5.1 km | MPC · JPL |
| 101650 | 1999 CU_{62} | — | February 12, 1999 | Socorro | LINEAR | · | 4.1 km | MPC · JPL |
| 101651 | 1999 CU_{66} | — | February 12, 1999 | Socorro | LINEAR | EOS | 3.7 km | MPC · JPL |
| 101652 | 1999 CD_{67} | — | February 12, 1999 | Socorro | LINEAR | · | 6.0 km | MPC · JPL |
| 101653 | 1999 CK_{68} | — | February 12, 1999 | Socorro | LINEAR | · | 5.4 km | MPC · JPL |
| 101654 | 1999 CE_{71} | — | February 12, 1999 | Socorro | LINEAR | · | 3.2 km | MPC · JPL |
| 101655 | 1999 CV_{71} | — | February 12, 1999 | Socorro | LINEAR | · | 3.1 km | MPC · JPL |
| 101656 | 1999 CC_{73} | — | February 12, 1999 | Socorro | LINEAR | · | 2.8 km | MPC · JPL |
| 101657 | 1999 CC_{76} | — | February 12, 1999 | Socorro | LINEAR | MAR | 3.2 km | MPC · JPL |
| 101658 | 1999 CG_{76} | — | February 12, 1999 | Socorro | LINEAR | NYS | 1.7 km | MPC · JPL |
| 101659 | 1999 CJ_{80} | — | February 12, 1999 | Socorro | LINEAR | · | 3.3 km | MPC · JPL |
| 101660 | 1999 CK_{80} | — | February 12, 1999 | Socorro | LINEAR | · | 3.1 km | MPC · JPL |
| 101661 | 1999 CS_{84} | — | February 10, 1999 | Socorro | LINEAR | · | 3.8 km | MPC · JPL |
| 101662 | 1999 CU_{84} | — | February 10, 1999 | Socorro | LINEAR | · | 3.1 km | MPC · JPL |
| 101663 | 1999 CW_{84} | — | February 10, 1999 | Socorro | LINEAR | · | 2.4 km | MPC · JPL |
| 101664 | 1999 CS_{88} | — | February 10, 1999 | Socorro | LINEAR | EOS | 3.4 km | MPC · JPL |
| 101665 | 1999 CV_{89} | — | February 10, 1999 | Socorro | LINEAR | · | 4.2 km | MPC · JPL |
| 101666 | 1999 CT_{92} | — | February 10, 1999 | Socorro | LINEAR | MAR | 3.6 km | MPC · JPL |
| 101667 | 1999 CX_{94} | — | February 10, 1999 | Socorro | LINEAR | V | 2.8 km | MPC · JPL |
| 101668 | 1999 CR_{95} | — | February 10, 1999 | Socorro | LINEAR | · | 6.9 km | MPC · JPL |
| 101669 | 1999 CC_{96} | — | February 10, 1999 | Socorro | LINEAR | · | 2.0 km | MPC · JPL |
| 101670 | 1999 CV_{96} | — | February 10, 1999 | Socorro | LINEAR | · | 3.1 km | MPC · JPL |
| 101671 | 1999 CB_{100} | — | February 10, 1999 | Socorro | LINEAR | · | 6.5 km | MPC · JPL |
| 101672 | 1999 CC_{101} | — | February 10, 1999 | Socorro | LINEAR | · | 3.0 km | MPC · JPL |
| 101673 | 1999 CE_{104} | — | February 12, 1999 | Socorro | LINEAR | THM | 5.8 km | MPC · JPL |
| 101674 | 1999 CU_{106} | — | February 12, 1999 | Socorro | LINEAR | T_{j} (2.94) | 6.1 km | MPC · JPL |
| 101675 | 1999 CO_{107} | — | February 12, 1999 | Socorro | LINEAR | · | 5.8 km | MPC · JPL |
| 101676 | 1999 CY_{107} | — | February 12, 1999 | Socorro | LINEAR | EOS | 4.2 km | MPC · JPL |
| 101677 | 1999 CK_{108} | — | February 12, 1999 | Socorro | LINEAR | · | 4.2 km | MPC · JPL |
| 101678 | 1999 CO_{108} | — | February 12, 1999 | Socorro | LINEAR | EUN | 3.0 km | MPC · JPL |
| 101679 | 1999 CR_{108} | — | February 12, 1999 | Socorro | LINEAR | · | 8.1 km | MPC · JPL |
| 101680 | 1999 CQ_{109} | — | February 12, 1999 | Socorro | LINEAR | · | 3.5 km | MPC · JPL |
| 101681 | 1999 CH_{110} | — | February 12, 1999 | Socorro | LINEAR | · | 3.1 km | MPC · JPL |
| 101682 | 1999 CN_{110} | — | February 12, 1999 | Socorro | LINEAR | · | 5.5 km | MPC · JPL |
| 101683 | 1999 CX_{111} | — | February 12, 1999 | Socorro | LINEAR | · | 3.0 km | MPC · JPL |
| 101684 | 1999 CZ_{111} | — | February 12, 1999 | Socorro | LINEAR | · | 4.1 km | MPC · JPL |
| 101685 | 1999 CA_{114} | — | February 12, 1999 | Socorro | LINEAR | · | 11 km | MPC · JPL |
| 101686 | 1999 CX_{114} | — | February 12, 1999 | Socorro | LINEAR | · | 1.5 km | MPC · JPL |
| 101687 | 1999 CA_{117} | — | February 12, 1999 | Socorro | LINEAR | GEF | 2.4 km | MPC · JPL |
| 101688 | 1999 CX_{117} | — | February 12, 1999 | Socorro | LINEAR | KON | 7.1 km | MPC · JPL |
| 101689 | 1999 CS_{119} | — | February 11, 1999 | Socorro | LINEAR | EUN | 2.4 km | MPC · JPL |
| 101690 | 1999 CA_{120} | — | February 11, 1999 | Socorro | LINEAR | · | 4.5 km | MPC · JPL |
| 101691 | 1999 CO_{120} | — | February 11, 1999 | Socorro | LINEAR | · | 3.7 km | MPC · JPL |
| 101692 | 1999 CM_{122} | — | February 11, 1999 | Socorro | LINEAR | TIR | 3.5 km | MPC · JPL |
| 101693 | 1999 CQ_{125} | — | February 11, 1999 | Socorro | LINEAR | PHO | 1.7 km | MPC · JPL |
| 101694 | 1999 CR_{125} | — | February 11, 1999 | Socorro | LINEAR | · | 5.6 km | MPC · JPL |
| 101695 | 1999 CC_{132} | — | February 8, 1999 | Kitt Peak | Spacewatch | · | 3.1 km | MPC · JPL |
| 101696 | 1999 CD_{132} | — | February 8, 1999 | Kitt Peak | Spacewatch | · | 6.4 km | MPC · JPL |
| 101697 | 1999 CV_{137} | — | February 9, 1999 | Kitt Peak | Spacewatch | · | 2.1 km | MPC · JPL |
| 101698 | 1999 CZ_{137} | — | February 9, 1999 | Kitt Peak | Spacewatch | · | 3.1 km | MPC · JPL |
| 101699 | 1999 CN_{147} | — | February 9, 1999 | Kitt Peak | Spacewatch | · | 2.9 km | MPC · JPL |
| 101700 | 1999 CO_{149} | — | February 13, 1999 | Kitt Peak | Spacewatch | HOF | 5.2 km | MPC · JPL |

== 101701–101800 ==
back to top

| Designation | | | Discovery | | | Properties | | Ref |
| Permanent | Provisional | Named after | Date | Site | Discoverer(s) | Category | Diam. | Ref |
|---|---|---|---|---|---|---|---|---|
| 101701 | 1999 CU_{149} | — | February 13, 1999 | Kitt Peak | Spacewatch | (5) | 2.5 km | MPC · JPL |
| 101702 | 1999 CV_{149} | — | February 13, 1999 | Kitt Peak | Spacewatch | THM | 4.2 km | MPC · JPL |
| 101703 | 1999 CA_{150} | — | February 13, 1999 | Kitt Peak | Spacewatch | · | 2.9 km | MPC · JPL |
| 101704 | 1999 CK_{150} | — | February 13, 1999 | Kitt Peak | Spacewatch | · | 7.4 km | MPC · JPL |
| 101705 | 1999 CK_{152} | — | February 12, 1999 | Kitt Peak | Spacewatch | THM | 4.0 km | MPC · JPL |
| 101706 | 1999 CB_{153} | — | February 13, 1999 | Kitt Peak | Spacewatch | EUN | 2.4 km | MPC · JPL |
| 101707 | 1999 CY_{153} | — | February 13, 1999 | Anderson Mesa | LONEOS | JUN | 2.7 km | MPC · JPL |
| 101708 | 1999 CV_{155} | — | February 12, 1999 | Anderson Mesa | LONEOS | · | 1.5 km | MPC · JPL |
| 101709 | 1999 CF_{157} | — | February 8, 1999 | Kitt Peak | Spacewatch | · | 1.5 km | MPC · JPL |
| 101710 | 1999 DQ | — | February 16, 1999 | Caussols | ODAS | URS | 6.3 km | MPC · JPL |
| 101711 | 1999 DT_{1} | — | February 18, 1999 | Haleakala | NEAT | · | 2.5 km | MPC · JPL |
| 101712 | 1999 DU_{2} | — | February 20, 1999 | Oizumi | T. Kobayashi | · | 3.3 km | MPC · JPL |
| 101713 Marston | 1999 DG_{4} | Marston | February 20, 1999 | Goodricke-Pigott | R. A. Tucker | · | 5.7 km | MPC · JPL |
| 101714 | 1999 DQ_{4} | — | February 17, 1999 | Socorro | LINEAR | · | 3.0 km | MPC · JPL |
| 101715 | 1999 DT_{4} | — | February 17, 1999 | Socorro | LINEAR | · | 6.7 km | MPC · JPL |
| 101716 | 1999 DJ_{6} | — | February 18, 1999 | Socorro | LINEAR | · | 13 km | MPC · JPL |
| 101717 | 1999 DR_{7} | — | February 18, 1999 | Anderson Mesa | LONEOS | · | 3.7 km | MPC · JPL |
| 101718 | 1999 EB | — | March 6, 1999 | Prescott | P. G. Comba | · | 3.8 km | MPC · JPL |
| 101719 | 1999 EF | — | March 10, 1999 | Prescott | P. G. Comba | · | 4.6 km | MPC · JPL |
| 101720 | 1999 EP_{1} | — | March 6, 1999 | Kitt Peak | Spacewatch | · | 1.4 km | MPC · JPL |
| 101721 Emanuelfritsch | 1999 EF_{3} | Emanuelfritsch | March 13, 1999 | Kleť | J. Tichá, M. Tichý | · | 5.2 km | MPC · JPL |
| 101722 Pursell | 1999 EX_{4} | Pursell | March 10, 1999 | Baton Rouge | W. R. Cooney Jr. | · | 10 km | MPC · JPL |
| 101723 Finger | 1999 EY_{5} | Finger | March 13, 1999 | Goodricke-Pigott | R. A. Tucker | · | 1.9 km | MPC · JPL |
| 101724 | 1999 ED_{6} | — | March 12, 1999 | Kitt Peak | Spacewatch | · | 9.2 km | MPC · JPL |
| 101725 | 1999 EG_{6} | — | March 13, 1999 | Kitt Peak | Spacewatch | · | 4.2 km | MPC · JPL |
| 101726 | 1999 EJ_{6} | — | March 14, 1999 | Kitt Peak | Spacewatch | · | 3.8 km | MPC · JPL |
| 101727 | 1999 ED_{7} | — | March 15, 1999 | Socorro | LINEAR | H | 1.3 km | MPC · JPL |
| 101728 | 1999 EW_{7} | — | March 12, 1999 | Kitt Peak | Spacewatch | · | 2.2 km | MPC · JPL |
| 101729 | 1999 EG_{9} | — | March 15, 1999 | Kitt Peak | Spacewatch | · | 3.1 km | MPC · JPL |
| 101730 | 1999 EX_{9} | — | March 14, 1999 | Kitt Peak | Spacewatch | (5) | 1.6 km | MPC · JPL |
| 101731 | 1999 EN_{10} | — | March 14, 1999 | Kitt Peak | Spacewatch | · | 2.1 km | MPC · JPL |
| 101732 | 1999 EV_{11} | — | March 15, 1999 | Socorro | LINEAR | · | 3.5 km | MPC · JPL |
| 101733 | 1999 ER_{12} | — | March 15, 1999 | Socorro | LINEAR | · | 7.8 km | MPC · JPL |
| 101734 | 1999 FU_{1} | — | March 16, 1999 | Kitt Peak | Spacewatch | · | 7.6 km | MPC · JPL |
| 101735 | 1999 FG_{2} | — | March 16, 1999 | Kitt Peak | Spacewatch | · | 8.4 km | MPC · JPL |
| 101736 | 1999 FH_{3} | — | March 17, 1999 | Kitt Peak | Spacewatch | · | 2.2 km | MPC · JPL |
| 101737 | 1999 FN_{3} | — | March 19, 1999 | Socorro | LINEAR | H | 1.5 km | MPC · JPL |
| 101738 | 1999 FY_{4} | — | March 17, 1999 | Kitt Peak | Spacewatch | · | 1.6 km | MPC · JPL |
| 101739 | 1999 FS_{6} | — | March 19, 1999 | Caussols | ODAS | · | 3.6 km | MPC · JPL |
| 101740 | 1999 FC_{7} | — | March 20, 1999 | Caussols | ODAS | EUN | 4.7 km | MPC · JPL |
| 101741 | 1999 FH_{7} | — | March 19, 1999 | Socorro | LINEAR | · | 2.9 km | MPC · JPL |
| 101742 | 1999 FO_{7} | — | March 20, 1999 | Socorro | LINEAR | · | 8.1 km | MPC · JPL |
| 101743 | 1999 FN_{8} | — | March 20, 1999 | Socorro | LINEAR | H | 1.0 km | MPC · JPL |
| 101744 | 1999 FO_{8} | — | March 20, 1999 | Socorro | LINEAR | · | 5.1 km | MPC · JPL |
| 101745 | 1999 FR_{8} | — | March 20, 1999 | Socorro | LINEAR | H | 920 m | MPC · JPL |
| 101746 | 1999 FO_{10} | — | March 22, 1999 | Needville | Rivich, K. | · | 5.6 km | MPC · JPL |
| 101747 | 1999 FL_{11} | — | March 18, 1999 | Kitt Peak | Spacewatch | · | 4.4 km | MPC · JPL |
| 101748 | 1999 FL_{13} | — | March 19, 1999 | Kitt Peak | Spacewatch | · | 2.2 km | MPC · JPL |
| 101749 | 1999 FW_{16} | — | March 23, 1999 | Kitt Peak | Spacewatch | · | 1.6 km | MPC · JPL |
| 101750 | 1999 FA_{17} | — | March 23, 1999 | Kitt Peak | Spacewatch | · | 3.0 km | MPC · JPL |
| 101751 | 1999 FQ_{17} | — | March 23, 1999 | Kitt Peak | Spacewatch | THM | 3.2 km | MPC · JPL |
| 101752 | 1999 FQ_{18} | — | March 22, 1999 | Anderson Mesa | LONEOS | CLO · | 6.9 km | MPC · JPL |
| 101753 | 1999 FT_{19} | — | March 24, 1999 | Monte Agliale | Santangelo, M. M. M. | EUN | 1.9 km | MPC · JPL |
| 101754 | 1999 FL_{20} | — | March 19, 1999 | Kitt Peak | Spacewatch | · | 3.5 km | MPC · JPL |
| 101755 | 1999 FN_{23} | — | March 19, 1999 | Socorro | LINEAR | THB | 6.3 km | MPC · JPL |
| 101756 | 1999 FQ_{24} | — | March 19, 1999 | Socorro | LINEAR | V | 1.5 km | MPC · JPL |
| 101757 | 1999 FA_{25} | — | March 19, 1999 | Socorro | LINEAR | · | 3.1 km | MPC · JPL |
| 101758 | 1999 FL_{29} | — | March 19, 1999 | Socorro | LINEAR | · | 3.1 km | MPC · JPL |
| 101759 | 1999 FA_{30} | — | March 19, 1999 | Socorro | LINEAR | · | 5.6 km | MPC · JPL |
| 101760 | 1999 FY_{36} | — | March 19, 1999 | Socorro | LINEAR | · | 4.9 km | MPC · JPL |
| 101761 | 1999 FJ_{37} | — | March 20, 1999 | Socorro | LINEAR | · | 6.6 km | MPC · JPL |
| 101762 | 1999 FO_{37} | — | March 20, 1999 | Socorro | LINEAR | · | 3.6 km | MPC · JPL |
| 101763 | 1999 FJ_{48} | — | March 20, 1999 | Socorro | LINEAR | · | 5.9 km | MPC · JPL |
| 101764 | 1999 FK_{49} | — | March 20, 1999 | Socorro | LINEAR | · | 5.4 km | MPC · JPL |
| 101765 | 1999 FO_{49} | — | March 20, 1999 | Socorro | LINEAR | ADE | 3.7 km | MPC · JPL |
| 101766 | 1999 FX_{49} | — | March 20, 1999 | Socorro | LINEAR | · | 3.5 km | MPC · JPL |
| 101767 | 1999 FJ_{50} | — | March 20, 1999 | Socorro | LINEAR | · | 3.6 km | MPC · JPL |
| 101768 | 1999 FS_{50} | — | March 20, 1999 | Socorro | LINEAR | EUN | 3.2 km | MPC · JPL |
| 101769 | 1999 FF_{52} | — | March 20, 1999 | Socorro | LINEAR | · | 5.1 km | MPC · JPL |
| 101770 | 1999 FL_{56} | — | March 20, 1999 | Socorro | LINEAR | HYG | 5.5 km | MPC · JPL |
| 101771 | 1999 FB_{58} | — | March 20, 1999 | Socorro | LINEAR | MAR | 2.6 km | MPC · JPL |
| 101772 | 1999 FY_{59} | — | March 18, 1999 | Kitt Peak | Spacewatch | EUN | 3.7 km | MPC · JPL |
| 101773 | 1999 FO_{62} | — | March 22, 1999 | Anderson Mesa | LONEOS | · | 6.4 km | MPC · JPL |
| 101774 | 1999 FR_{62} | — | March 22, 1999 | Anderson Mesa | LONEOS | · | 3.3 km | MPC · JPL |
| 101775 | 1999 GT | — | April 5, 1999 | Višnjan Observatory | K. Korlević | · | 1.9 km | MPC · JPL |
| 101776 | 1999 GF_{3} | — | April 7, 1999 | Kitt Peak | Spacewatch | · | 3.9 km | MPC · JPL |
| 101777 Robhoskins | 1999 GF_{4} | Robhoskins | April 13, 1999 | Baton Rouge | W. R. Cooney Jr., Howard, M. | · | 4.6 km | MPC · JPL |
| 101778 | 1999 GZ_{6} | — | April 15, 1999 | Socorro | LINEAR | · | 5.7 km | MPC · JPL |
| 101779 | 1999 GJ_{8} | — | April 9, 1999 | Anderson Mesa | LONEOS | · | 3.2 km | MPC · JPL |
| 101780 | 1999 GP_{8} | — | April 10, 1999 | Anderson Mesa | LONEOS | · | 1.7 km | MPC · JPL |
| 101781 Gojira | 1999 GU_{9} | Gojira | April 14, 1999 | Goodricke-Pigott | R. A. Tucker | · | 4.4 km | MPC · JPL |
| 101782 | 1999 GF_{10} | — | April 11, 1999 | Kitt Peak | Spacewatch | · | 1.1 km | MPC · JPL |
| 101783 | 1999 GV_{13} | — | April 14, 1999 | Kitt Peak | Spacewatch | HYG | 5.6 km | MPC · JPL |
| 101784 | 1999 GQ_{14} | — | April 14, 1999 | Kitt Peak | Spacewatch | · | 5.8 km | MPC · JPL |
| 101785 | 1999 GE_{16} | — | April 9, 1999 | Socorro | LINEAR | · | 1.5 km | MPC · JPL |
| 101786 | 1999 GY_{17} | — | April 15, 1999 | Socorro | LINEAR | EUN | 4.1 km | MPC · JPL |
| 101787 | 1999 GD_{26} | — | April 7, 1999 | Socorro | LINEAR | MAR | 2.8 km | MPC · JPL |
| 101788 | 1999 GN_{33} | — | April 12, 1999 | Socorro | LINEAR | EUN | 7.6 km | MPC · JPL |
| 101789 | 1999 GE_{35} | — | April 6, 1999 | Socorro | LINEAR | · | 5.1 km | MPC · JPL |
| 101790 | 1999 GR_{36} | — | April 12, 1999 | Socorro | LINEAR | · | 7.2 km | MPC · JPL |
| 101791 | 1999 GV_{44} | — | April 12, 1999 | Socorro | LINEAR | · | 4.7 km | MPC · JPL |
| 101792 | 1999 GC_{45} | — | April 12, 1999 | Socorro | LINEAR | · | 7.4 km | MPC · JPL |
| 101793 | 1999 GN_{48} | — | April 7, 1999 | Anderson Mesa | LONEOS | · | 3.0 km | MPC · JPL |
| 101794 | 1999 GK_{50} | — | April 10, 1999 | Anderson Mesa | LONEOS | · | 3.3 km | MPC · JPL |
| 101795 | 1999 HX_{2} | — | April 22, 1999 | Socorro | LINEAR | T_{j} (2.88) | 5.3 km | MPC · JPL |
| 101796 | 1999 HN_{3} | — | April 18, 1999 | Catalina | CSS | MAR | 3.8 km | MPC · JPL |
| 101797 | 1999 HR_{3} | — | April 18, 1999 | Catalina | CSS | H | 980 m | MPC · JPL |
| 101798 | 1999 HL_{4} | — | April 16, 1999 | Kitt Peak | Spacewatch | · | 3.5 km | MPC · JPL |
| 101799 | 1999 HE_{5} | — | April 17, 1999 | Kitt Peak | Spacewatch | · | 4.5 km | MPC · JPL |
| 101800 | 1999 HU_{7} | — | April 19, 1999 | Kitt Peak | Spacewatch | · | 3.6 km | MPC · JPL |

== 101801–101900 ==
back to top

| Designation | | | Discovery | | | Properties | | Ref |
| Permanent | Provisional | Named after | Date | Site | Discoverer(s) | Category | Diam. | Ref |
|---|---|---|---|---|---|---|---|---|
| 101801 | 1999 HS_{8} | — | April 17, 1999 | Socorro | LINEAR | · | 3.0 km | MPC · JPL |
| 101802 | 1999 HV_{8} | — | April 17, 1999 | Socorro | LINEAR | EUN | 2.7 km | MPC · JPL |
| 101803 | 1999 JH | — | May 6, 1999 | Socorro | LINEAR | H | 1.4 km | MPC · JPL |
| 101804 | 1999 JR_{4} | — | May 10, 1999 | Socorro | LINEAR | · | 1.4 km | MPC · JPL |
| 101805 | 1999 JT_{4} | — | May 10, 1999 | Socorro | LINEAR | H | 1.3 km | MPC · JPL |
| 101806 | 1999 JX_{4} | — | May 10, 1999 | Socorro | LINEAR | H | 1.4 km | MPC · JPL |
| 101807 | 1999 JJ_{5} | — | May 10, 1999 | Socorro | LINEAR | · | 6.3 km | MPC · JPL |
| 101808 | 1999 JO_{5} | — | May 10, 1999 | Socorro | LINEAR | H | 1.4 km | MPC · JPL |
| 101809 | 1999 JW_{5} | — | May 12, 1999 | Socorro | LINEAR | H | 990 m | MPC · JPL |
| 101810 Beiyou | 1999 JA_{6} | Beiyou | May 8, 1999 | Xinglong | SCAP | · | 8.0 km | MPC · JPL |
| 101811 Jakobkaup | 1999 JQ_{6} | Jakobkaup | May 14, 1999 | Catalina | CSS | · | 4.4 km | MPC · JPL |
| 101812 | 1999 JD_{7} | — | May 8, 1999 | Catalina | CSS | · | 3.6 km | MPC · JPL |
| 101813 Elizabethmarston | 1999 JX_{7} | Elizabethmarston | May 14, 1999 | Goodricke-Pigott | R. A. Tucker | H · | 1.5 km | MPC · JPL |
| 101814 | 1999 JD_{8} | — | May 12, 1999 | Socorro | LINEAR | T_{j} (2.9) | 4.5 km | MPC · JPL |
| 101815 | 1999 JB_{12} | — | May 13, 1999 | Socorro | LINEAR | H | 1.5 km | MPC · JPL |
| 101816 | 1999 JN_{12} | — | May 8, 1999 | Catalina | CSS | · | 6.2 km | MPC · JPL |
| 101817 | 1999 JP_{12} | — | May 8, 1999 | Catalina | CSS | · | 3.1 km | MPC · JPL |
| 101818 | 1999 JD_{13} | — | May 14, 1999 | Mauna Kea | D. J. Tholen, Whiteley, R. J. | · | 1.2 km | MPC · JPL |
| 101819 | 1999 JK_{13} | — | May 8, 1999 | Socorro | LINEAR | · | 10 km | MPC · JPL |
| 101820 | 1999 JC_{14} | — | May 13, 1999 | Socorro | LINEAR | H | 1.4 km | MPC · JPL |
| 101821 | 1999 JJ_{14} | — | May 13, 1999 | Socorro | LINEAR | H | 1.5 km | MPC · JPL |
| 101822 | 1999 JE_{17} | — | May 15, 1999 | Kitt Peak | Spacewatch | · | 1.3 km | MPC · JPL |
| 101823 | 1999 JC_{20} | — | May 10, 1999 | Socorro | LINEAR | · | 4.5 km | MPC · JPL |
| 101824 | 1999 JF_{22} | — | May 10, 1999 | Socorro | LINEAR | · | 3.7 km | MPC · JPL |
| 101825 | 1999 JB_{23} | — | May 10, 1999 | Socorro | LINEAR | NYS | 1.9 km | MPC · JPL |
| 101826 | 1999 JY_{23} | — | May 10, 1999 | Socorro | LINEAR | · | 4.6 km | MPC · JPL |
| 101827 | 1999 JM_{24} | — | May 10, 1999 | Socorro | LINEAR | · | 3.7 km | MPC · JPL |
| 101828 | 1999 JM_{26} | — | May 10, 1999 | Socorro | LINEAR | · | 4.2 km | MPC · JPL |
| 101829 | 1999 JW_{28} | — | May 10, 1999 | Socorro | LINEAR | · | 3.0 km | MPC · JPL |
| 101830 | 1999 JR_{31} | — | May 10, 1999 | Socorro | LINEAR | · | 4.9 km | MPC · JPL |
| 101831 | 1999 JO_{40} | — | May 10, 1999 | Socorro | LINEAR | · | 4.1 km | MPC · JPL |
| 101832 | 1999 JL_{55} | — | May 10, 1999 | Socorro | LINEAR | · | 3.2 km | MPC · JPL |
| 101833 | 1999 JO_{55} | — | May 10, 1999 | Socorro | LINEAR | · | 4.2 km | MPC · JPL |
| 101834 | 1999 JF_{56} | — | May 10, 1999 | Socorro | LINEAR | · | 3.7 km | MPC · JPL |
| 101835 | 1999 JP_{56} | — | May 10, 1999 | Socorro | LINEAR | · | 5.3 km | MPC · JPL |
| 101836 | 1999 JL_{59} | — | May 10, 1999 | Socorro | LINEAR | · | 3.0 km | MPC · JPL |
| 101837 | 1999 JQ_{60} | — | May 10, 1999 | Socorro | LINEAR | · | 2.0 km | MPC · JPL |
| 101838 | 1999 JT_{62} | — | May 10, 1999 | Socorro | LINEAR | · | 2.2 km | MPC · JPL |
| 101839 | 1999 JE_{65} | — | May 12, 1999 | Socorro | LINEAR | NYS | 2.2 km | MPC · JPL |
| 101840 | 1999 JU_{65} | — | May 12, 1999 | Socorro | LINEAR | ERI | 4.0 km | MPC · JPL |
| 101841 | 1999 JM_{67} | — | May 12, 1999 | Socorro | LINEAR | · | 8.4 km | MPC · JPL |
| 101842 | 1999 JL_{69} | — | May 12, 1999 | Socorro | LINEAR | · | 4.0 km | MPC · JPL |
| 101843 | 1999 JN_{70} | — | May 12, 1999 | Socorro | LINEAR | GEF | 3.4 km | MPC · JPL |
| 101844 | 1999 JL_{72} | — | May 12, 1999 | Socorro | LINEAR | · | 1.3 km | MPC · JPL |
| 101845 | 1999 JL_{74} | — | May 12, 1999 | Socorro | LINEAR | · | 4.1 km | MPC · JPL |
| 101846 | 1999 JB_{88} | — | May 12, 1999 | Socorro | LINEAR | · | 8.3 km | MPC · JPL |
| 101847 | 1999 JG_{90} | — | May 12, 1999 | Socorro | LINEAR | · | 2.9 km | MPC · JPL |
| 101848 | 1999 JV_{90} | — | May 12, 1999 | Socorro | LINEAR | · | 1.4 km | MPC · JPL |
| 101849 | 1999 JJ_{91} | — | May 12, 1999 | Socorro | LINEAR | · | 4.3 km | MPC · JPL |
| 101850 | 1999 JT_{91} | — | May 12, 1999 | Socorro | LINEAR | ADE | 7.8 km | MPC · JPL |
| 101851 | 1999 JU_{96} | — | May 12, 1999 | Socorro | LINEAR | EOS | 3.8 km | MPC · JPL |
| 101852 | 1999 JY_{97} | — | May 12, 1999 | Socorro | LINEAR | · | 2.5 km | MPC · JPL |
| 101853 | 1999 JU_{107} | — | May 13, 1999 | Socorro | LINEAR | · | 1.5 km | MPC · JPL |
| 101854 | 1999 JO_{115} | — | May 13, 1999 | Socorro | LINEAR | · | 2.0 km | MPC · JPL |
| 101855 | 1999 JG_{118} | — | May 13, 1999 | Socorro | LINEAR | NYS · | 3.9 km | MPC · JPL |
| 101856 | 1999 JA_{121} | — | May 13, 1999 | Socorro | LINEAR | · | 6.8 km | MPC · JPL |
| 101857 | 1999 JZ_{125} | — | May 13, 1999 | Socorro | LINEAR | · | 7.4 km | MPC · JPL |
| 101858 | 1999 KE_{8} | — | May 18, 1999 | Socorro | LINEAR | · | 5.5 km | MPC · JPL |
| 101859 | 1999 LA | — | June 2, 1999 | Woomera | F. B. Zoltowski | · | 1.3 km | MPC · JPL |
| 101860 | 1999 LN_{2} | — | June 8, 1999 | Socorro | LINEAR | H | 1.0 km | MPC · JPL |
| 101861 | 1999 LA_{4} | — | June 9, 1999 | Socorro | LINEAR | H | 1.4 km | MPC · JPL |
| 101862 | 1999 LH_{4} | — | June 10, 1999 | Socorro | LINEAR | H | 1.0 km | MPC · JPL |
| 101863 | 1999 LZ_{5} | — | June 11, 1999 | Socorro | LINEAR | · | 1.6 km | MPC · JPL |
| 101864 | 1999 LF_{7} | — | June 10, 1999 | Kitt Peak | Spacewatch | · | 3.8 km | MPC · JPL |
| 101865 | 1999 LG_{11} | — | June 8, 1999 | Socorro | LINEAR | · | 1.1 km | MPC · JPL |
| 101866 | 1999 LM_{15} | — | June 12, 1999 | Socorro | LINEAR | H | 1.3 km | MPC · JPL |
| 101867 | 1999 LR_{15} | — | June 12, 1999 | Socorro | LINEAR | PHO | 2.8 km | MPC · JPL |
| 101868 | 1999 LE_{35} | — | June 15, 1999 | Socorro | LINEAR | · | 2.3 km | MPC · JPL |
| 101869 | 1999 MM | — | June 20, 1999 | Anderson Mesa | LONEOS | APO · PHA | 450 m | MPC · JPL |
| 101870 | 1999 NV | — | July 7, 1999 | Višnjan Observatory | K. Korlević | · | 4.6 km | MPC · JPL |
| 101871 | 1999 NV_{1} | — | July 12, 1999 | Socorro | LINEAR | PHO | 5.5 km | MPC · JPL |
| 101872 | 1999 NO_{4} | — | July 13, 1999 | Reedy Creek | J. Broughton | · | 1.5 km | MPC · JPL |
| 101873 | 1999 NC_{5} | — | July 13, 1999 | Socorro | LINEAR | AMO +1km | 1.9 km | MPC · JPL |
| 101874 | 1999 NM_{8} | — | July 13, 1999 | Socorro | LINEAR | · | 1.5 km | MPC · JPL |
| 101875 | 1999 NA_{9} | — | July 13, 1999 | Socorro | LINEAR | · | 1.7 km | MPC · JPL |
| 101876 | 1999 NJ_{15} | — | July 14, 1999 | Socorro | LINEAR | · | 2.8 km | MPC · JPL |
| 101877 | 1999 NA_{16} | — | July 14, 1999 | Socorro | LINEAR | · | 1.3 km | MPC · JPL |
| 101878 | 1999 NR_{23} | — | July 14, 1999 | Socorro | LINEAR | · | 1.2 km | MPC · JPL |
| 101879 | 1999 NP_{26} | — | July 14, 1999 | Socorro | LINEAR | · | 2.0 km | MPC · JPL |
| 101880 | 1999 NJ_{29} | — | July 14, 1999 | Socorro | LINEAR | · | 3.3 km | MPC · JPL |
| 101881 | 1999 NO_{30} | — | July 14, 1999 | Socorro | LINEAR | · | 1.6 km | MPC · JPL |
| 101882 | 1999 NK_{36} | — | July 14, 1999 | Socorro | LINEAR | · | 1.7 km | MPC · JPL |
| 101883 | 1999 NT_{36} | — | July 14, 1999 | Socorro | LINEAR | PHO | 3.8 km | MPC · JPL |
| 101884 | 1999 ND_{38} | — | July 14, 1999 | Socorro | LINEAR | NYS | 1.7 km | MPC · JPL |
| 101885 | 1999 NV_{40} | — | July 14, 1999 | Socorro | LINEAR | (22805) | 9.9 km | MPC · JPL |
| 101886 | 1999 NU_{41} | — | July 14, 1999 | Socorro | LINEAR | · | 9.9 km | MPC · JPL |
| 101887 | 1999 NG_{42} | — | July 14, 1999 | Socorro | LINEAR | NYS | 1.8 km | MPC · JPL |
| 101888 | 1999 NM_{42} | — | July 14, 1999 | Socorro | LINEAR | · | 2.5 km | MPC · JPL |
| 101889 | 1999 NE_{55} | — | July 12, 1999 | Socorro | LINEAR | slow | 10 km | MPC · JPL |
| 101890 | 1999 NK_{55} | — | July 12, 1999 | Socorro | LINEAR | T_{j} (2.98) | 16 km | MPC · JPL |
| 101891 | 1999 NL_{55} | — | July 12, 1999 | Socorro | LINEAR | · | 6.7 km | MPC · JPL |
| 101892 | 1999 NV_{64} | — | July 14, 1999 | Socorro | LINEAR | · | 3.7 km | MPC · JPL |
| 101893 | 1999 PJ | — | August 6, 1999 | Kleť | Kleť | · | 2.3 km | MPC · JPL |
| 101894 | 1999 PD_{2} | — | August 9, 1999 | Prescott | P. G. Comba | · | 7.3 km | MPC · JPL |
| 101895 | 1999 PE_{3} | — | August 11, 1999 | Prescott | P. G. Comba | · | 2.4 km | MPC · JPL |
| 101896 | 1999 PM_{3} | — | August 12, 1999 | Prescott | P. G. Comba | · | 1.3 km | MPC · JPL |
| 101897 | 1999 PO_{4} | — | August 15, 1999 | Reedy Creek | J. Broughton | · | 6.5 km | MPC · JPL |
| 101898 | 1999 PQ_{6} | — | August 7, 1999 | Anderson Mesa | LONEOS | · | 1.3 km | MPC · JPL |
| 101899 | 1999 PT_{8} | — | August 8, 1999 | Anderson Mesa | LONEOS | · | 2.1 km | MPC · JPL |
| 101900 | 1999 QH | — | August 18, 1999 | Gekko | T. Kagawa | · | 3.4 km | MPC · JPL |

== 101901–102000 ==
back to top

| Designation | | | Discovery | | | Properties | | Ref |
| Permanent | Provisional | Named after | Date | Site | Discoverer(s) | Category | Diam. | Ref |
|---|---|---|---|---|---|---|---|---|
| 101901 | 1999 QD_{2} | — | August 22, 1999 | Anderson Mesa | LONEOS | · | 1.1 km | MPC · JPL |
| 101902 Gisellaluccone | 1999 RN | Gisellaluccone | September 3, 1999 | Ceccano | G. Masi | · | 2.6 km | MPC · JPL |
| 101903 | 1999 RR | — | September 3, 1999 | Ondřejov | L. Kotková | HYG | 7.7 km | MPC · JPL |
| 101904 | 1999 RD_{1} | — | September 4, 1999 | Gekko | T. Kagawa | · | 1.7 km | MPC · JPL |
| 101905 | 1999 RN_{1} | — | September 4, 1999 | Farpoint | Farpoint | NYS | 2.0 km | MPC · JPL |
| 101906 | 1999 RX_{1} | — | September 6, 1999 | Višnjan Observatory | K. Korlević | NYS | 3.0 km | MPC · JPL |
| 101907 | 1999 RC_{3} | — | September 6, 1999 | Višnjan Observatory | K. Korlević | · | 7.3 km | MPC · JPL |
| 101908 | 1999 RG_{4} | — | September 5, 1999 | Catalina | CSS | · | 7.3 km | MPC · JPL |
| 101909 | 1999 RU_{6} | — | September 3, 1999 | Kitt Peak | Spacewatch | · | 1.8 km | MPC · JPL |
| 101910 | 1999 RR_{8} | — | September 4, 1999 | Kitt Peak | Spacewatch | · | 2.6 km | MPC · JPL |
| 101911 | 1999 RN_{9} | — | September 4, 1999 | Kitt Peak | Spacewatch | · | 6.7 km | MPC · JPL |
| 101912 | 1999 RK_{10} | — | September 7, 1999 | Socorro | LINEAR | · | 1.1 km | MPC · JPL |
| 101913 | 1999 RT_{10} | — | September 7, 1999 | Socorro | LINEAR | NYS | 1.8 km | MPC · JPL |
| 101914 | 1999 RW_{10} | — | September 7, 1999 | Socorro | LINEAR | · | 1.3 km | MPC · JPL |
| 101915 | 1999 RV_{12} | — | September 7, 1999 | Socorro | LINEAR | · | 1.5 km | MPC · JPL |
| 101916 | 1999 RN_{13} | — | September 7, 1999 | Socorro | LINEAR | · | 2.7 km | MPC · JPL |
| 101917 | 1999 RB_{14} | — | September 7, 1999 | Socorro | LINEAR | · | 4.3 km | MPC · JPL |
| 101918 | 1999 RC_{14} | — | September 7, 1999 | Socorro | LINEAR | · | 1.6 km | MPC · JPL |
| 101919 | 1999 RL_{14} | — | September 7, 1999 | Socorro | LINEAR | · | 1.6 km | MPC · JPL |
| 101920 | 1999 RD_{15} | — | September 7, 1999 | Socorro | LINEAR | V | 1.5 km | MPC · JPL |
| 101921 | 1999 RT_{15} | — | September 7, 1999 | Socorro | LINEAR | VER | 8.8 km | MPC · JPL |
| 101922 | 1999 RG_{16} | — | September 7, 1999 | Socorro | LINEAR | · | 1.7 km | MPC · JPL |
| 101923 | 1999 RC_{18} | — | September 7, 1999 | Socorro | LINEAR | NYS | 2.6 km | MPC · JPL |
| 101924 | 1999 RD_{18} | — | September 7, 1999 | Socorro | LINEAR | · | 1.7 km | MPC · JPL |
| 101925 | 1999 RK_{18} | — | September 7, 1999 | Socorro | LINEAR | · | 1.8 km | MPC · JPL |
| 101926 | 1999 RT_{18} | — | September 7, 1999 | Socorro | LINEAR | · | 5.3 km | MPC · JPL |
| 101927 | 1999 RN_{19} | — | September 7, 1999 | Socorro | LINEAR | THM | 7.1 km | MPC · JPL |
| 101928 | 1999 RY_{19} | — | September 7, 1999 | Socorro | LINEAR | · | 1.7 km | MPC · JPL |
| 101929 | 1999 RP_{20} | — | September 7, 1999 | Socorro | LINEAR | URS | 6.7 km | MPC · JPL |
| 101930 | 1999 RU_{20} | — | September 7, 1999 | Socorro | LINEAR | · | 4.2 km | MPC · JPL |
| 101931 | 1999 RZ_{20} | — | September 7, 1999 | Socorro | LINEAR | · | 1.7 km | MPC · JPL |
| 101932 | 1999 RN_{21} | — | September 7, 1999 | Socorro | LINEAR | · | 1.6 km | MPC · JPL |
| 101933 | 1999 RS_{21} | — | September 7, 1999 | Socorro | LINEAR | · | 1.6 km | MPC · JPL |
| 101934 | 1999 RS_{22} | — | September 7, 1999 | Socorro | LINEAR | · | 2.2 km | MPC · JPL |
| 101935 | 1999 RV_{22} | — | September 7, 1999 | Socorro | LINEAR | · | 4.9 km | MPC · JPL |
| 101936 | 1999 RW_{22} | — | September 7, 1999 | Socorro | LINEAR | · | 4.5 km | MPC · JPL |
| 101937 | 1999 RD_{23} | — | September 7, 1999 | Socorro | LINEAR | PHO | 2.4 km | MPC · JPL |
| 101938 | 1999 RK_{23} | — | September 7, 1999 | Socorro | LINEAR | PHO | 2.6 km | MPC · JPL |
| 101939 | 1999 RN_{23} | — | September 7, 1999 | Socorro | LINEAR | · | 1.4 km | MPC · JPL |
| 101940 | 1999 RW_{23} | — | September 7, 1999 | Socorro | LINEAR | · | 1.8 km | MPC · JPL |
| 101941 | 1999 RX_{23} | — | September 7, 1999 | Socorro | LINEAR | · | 1.9 km | MPC · JPL |
| 101942 | 1999 RP_{24} | — | September 7, 1999 | Socorro | LINEAR | · | 1.8 km | MPC · JPL |
| 101943 | 1999 RS_{24} | — | September 7, 1999 | Socorro | LINEAR | · | 2.7 km | MPC · JPL |
| 101944 | 1999 RU_{24} | — | September 7, 1999 | Socorro | LINEAR | · | 2.4 km | MPC · JPL |
| 101945 | 1999 RP_{25} | — | September 7, 1999 | Socorro | LINEAR | T_{j} (2.95) | 7.4 km | MPC · JPL |
| 101946 | 1999 RR_{26} | — | September 7, 1999 | Socorro | LINEAR | · | 3.4 km | MPC · JPL |
| 101947 | 1999 RS_{26} | — | September 7, 1999 | Socorro | LINEAR | · | 2.4 km | MPC · JPL |
| 101948 | 1999 RT_{26} | — | September 7, 1999 | Socorro | LINEAR | MAS | 1.4 km | MPC · JPL |
| 101949 | 1999 RX_{26} | — | September 7, 1999 | Socorro | LINEAR | · | 1.5 km | MPC · JPL |
| 101950 | 1999 RB_{29} | — | September 7, 1999 | Socorro | LINEAR | T_{j} (2.94) | 7.1 km | MPC · JPL |
| 101951 | 1999 RK_{31} | — | September 9, 1999 | Višnjan Observatory | K. Korlević | · | 1.7 km | MPC · JPL |
| 101952 | 1999 RY_{31} | — | September 8, 1999 | Catalina | CSS | · | 1.6 km | MPC · JPL |
| 101953 | 1999 RM_{32} | — | September 9, 1999 | Višnjan Observatory | K. Korlević | V | 1.7 km | MPC · JPL |
| 101954 | 1999 RY_{33} | — | September 10, 1999 | Socorro | LINEAR | T_{j} (2.98) · fast | 5.2 km | MPC · JPL |
| 101955 Bennu | 1999 RQ_{36} | Bennu | September 11, 1999 | Socorro | LINEAR | APO · PHA | 490 m | MPC · JPL |
| 101956 | 1999 RS_{36} | — | September 11, 1999 | Višnjan Observatory | K. Korlević | · | 2.6 km | MPC · JPL |
| 101957 | 1999 RT_{36} | — | September 12, 1999 | Višnjan Observatory | K. Korlević | · | 3.4 km | MPC · JPL |
| 101958 | 1999 RS_{37} | — | September 12, 1999 | Farra d'Isonzo | Farra d'Isonzo | EUN | 4.0 km | MPC · JPL |
| 101959 | 1999 RH_{38} | — | September 13, 1999 | Višnjan Observatory | K. Korlević | · | 2.8 km | MPC · JPL |
| 101960 Molau | 1999 RR_{38} | Molau | September 11, 1999 | Drebach | ~Knöfel, A. | · | 1.1 km | MPC · JPL |
| 101961 Augustklipstein | 1999 RL_{39} | Augustklipstein | September 8, 1999 | Catalina | CSS | · | 1.7 km | MPC · JPL |
| 101962 | 1999 RV_{39} | — | September 12, 1999 | Catalina | CSS | · | 2.4 km | MPC · JPL |
| 101963 | 1999 RG_{40} | — | September 15, 1999 | Kleť | Kleť | NYS | 1.5 km | MPC · JPL |
| 101964 | 1999 RU_{41} | — | September 13, 1999 | Višnjan Observatory | K. Korlević | (5) | 3.8 km | MPC · JPL |
| 101965 | 1999 RY_{41} | — | September 13, 1999 | Višnjan Observatory | K. Korlević | T_{j} (2.94) | 10 km | MPC · JPL |
| 101966 | 1999 RO_{43} | — | September 14, 1999 | Modra | A. Galád, P. Kolény | · | 2.0 km | MPC · JPL |
| 101967 | 1999 RQ_{43} | — | September 13, 1999 | Fountain Hills | C. W. Juels | · | 2.8 km | MPC · JPL |
| 101968 | 1999 RC_{45} | — | September 7, 1999 | Socorro | LINEAR | · | 2.5 km | MPC · JPL |
| 101969 | 1999 RJ_{45} | — | September 13, 1999 | Siding Spring | R. H. McNaught | · | 5.8 km | MPC · JPL |
| 101970 | 1999 RR_{46} | — | September 7, 1999 | Socorro | LINEAR | · | 3.9 km | MPC · JPL |
| 101971 | 1999 RG_{48} | — | September 7, 1999 | Socorro | LINEAR | · | 1.7 km | MPC · JPL |
| 101972 | 1999 RN_{48} | — | September 7, 1999 | Socorro | LINEAR | · | 3.0 km | MPC · JPL |
| 101973 | 1999 RT_{48} | — | September 7, 1999 | Socorro | LINEAR | · | 2.1 km | MPC · JPL |
| 101974 | 1999 RC_{49} | — | September 7, 1999 | Socorro | LINEAR | · | 1.2 km | MPC · JPL |
| 101975 | 1999 RB_{50} | — | September 7, 1999 | Socorro | LINEAR | · | 2.1 km | MPC · JPL |
| 101976 | 1999 RS_{51} | — | September 7, 1999 | Socorro | LINEAR | · | 1.4 km | MPC · JPL |
| 101977 | 1999 RA_{52} | — | September 7, 1999 | Socorro | LINEAR | · | 1.9 km | MPC · JPL |
| 101978 | 1999 RZ_{52} | — | September 7, 1999 | Socorro | LINEAR | · | 1.7 km | MPC · JPL |
| 101979 | 1999 RG_{53} | — | September 7, 1999 | Socorro | LINEAR | HYG | 5.0 km | MPC · JPL |
| 101980 | 1999 RX_{54} | — | September 7, 1999 | Socorro | LINEAR | · | 1.8 km | MPC · JPL |
| 101981 | 1999 RB_{56} | — | September 7, 1999 | Socorro | LINEAR | · | 1.9 km | MPC · JPL |
| 101982 | 1999 RH_{58} | — | September 7, 1999 | Socorro | LINEAR | · | 1.8 km | MPC · JPL |
| 101983 | 1999 RL_{59} | — | September 7, 1999 | Socorro | LINEAR | · | 1.7 km | MPC · JPL |
| 101984 | 1999 RB_{61} | — | September 7, 1999 | Socorro | LINEAR | · | 3.8 km | MPC · JPL |
| 101985 | 1999 RE_{61} | — | September 7, 1999 | Socorro | LINEAR | · | 1.5 km | MPC · JPL |
| 101986 | 1999 RS_{62} | — | September 7, 1999 | Socorro | LINEAR | · | 1.4 km | MPC · JPL |
| 101987 | 1999 RZ_{62} | — | September 7, 1999 | Socorro | LINEAR | · | 2.7 km | MPC · JPL |
| 101988 | 1999 RG_{64} | — | September 7, 1999 | Socorro | LINEAR | · | 5.2 km | MPC · JPL |
| 101989 | 1999 RK_{65} | — | September 7, 1999 | Socorro | LINEAR | V | 1.2 km | MPC · JPL |
| 101990 | 1999 RF_{67} | — | September 7, 1999 | Socorro | LINEAR | · | 1.5 km | MPC · JPL |
| 101991 | 1999 RK_{67} | — | September 7, 1999 | Socorro | LINEAR | · | 2.2 km | MPC · JPL |
| 101992 | 1999 RT_{67} | — | September 7, 1999 | Socorro | LINEAR | · | 6.7 km | MPC · JPL |
| 101993 | 1999 RJ_{70} | — | September 7, 1999 | Socorro | LINEAR | · | 2.4 km | MPC · JPL |
| 101994 | 1999 RX_{70} | — | September 7, 1999 | Socorro | LINEAR | · | 1.7 km | MPC · JPL |
| 101995 | 1999 RZ_{71} | — | September 7, 1999 | Socorro | LINEAR | · | 2.0 km | MPC · JPL |
| 101996 | 1999 RE_{72} | — | September 7, 1999 | Socorro | LINEAR | · | 1.7 km | MPC · JPL |
| 101997 | 1999 RU_{75} | — | September 7, 1999 | Socorro | LINEAR | · | 2.9 km | MPC · JPL |
| 101998 | 1999 RJ_{76} | — | September 7, 1999 | Socorro | LINEAR | · | 1.7 km | MPC · JPL |
| 101999 | 1999 RM_{76} | — | September 7, 1999 | Socorro | LINEAR | · | 2.1 km | MPC · JPL |
| 102000 | 1999 RX_{76} | — | September 7, 1999 | Socorro | LINEAR | · | 1.7 km | MPC · JPL |

back to top

== See also ==
- Meanings of minor-planet names: 101001–102000
