= Ian P. Griffin =

New Zealand astronomer

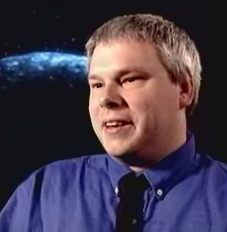
Dr. Ian P. Griffin at the Space Telescope Science Institute. NASA image

Ian Paul Griffin CRSNZ (born 1966) is a New Zealand astronomer, discoverer of minor planets and a public spokesman upon scientific matters. He is currently the Director of Otago Museum, Dunedin, New Zealand. Griffin was the CEO of Science Oxford, in Oxford, United Kingdom, and the former head of public outreach at NASA's Space Telescope Science Institute.

== Biographical information ==
Griffin began his professional life at University College London (UCL) where he decided to pursue a career combining both astronomical research and public outreach. He obtained his PhD in astronomy from UCL in 1991. His doctoral thesis was titled The circumstellar environments of late type stars. He was director of the Armagh Planetarium from 1990 to 1995. He then worked at Astronaut Memorial Planetarium and Observatory at Brevard Community College in Cocoa, Florida and Auckland Observatory in New Zealand before accepting the position as head of public outreach at the Space Telescope Science Institute in Baltimore, US.

From 2004 to 2007, Griffin was director of the Museum of Science and Industry in Manchester.

Griffin has a strong Twitter presence and regularly updates followers with photos of the Aurora Australis and of other astronomical phenomena.

== Significant achievements ==
Discovered minor planets: 25
10924 Mariagriffin	29 January 1998	MPC
11678 Brevard	25 February 1998	MPC
13376 Dunphy	15 November 1998	MPC
14179 Skinner	15 November 1998	MPC
17020 Hopemeraengus	24 February 1999	MPC
23988 Maungakiekie	2 September 1999	MPC
23990 Springsteen	4 September 1999	MPC
25273 Barrycarole	15 November 1998	MPC
27120 Isabelhawkins	28 November 1998	MPC
31239 Michaeljames	21 February 1998	MPC
31268 Welty	16 March 1998	MPC
33179 Arsènewenger	29 March 1998	MPC
44527 Tonnon	22 dicembre 1998	MPC
49291 Thechills	8 November 1998	MPC
53109 Martinphillipps	12 January 1999	MPC
66856 Stephenvoss^{(*)}	13 November 1999	MPC
85773 Gutbezahl	25 October 1998	MPC
101461 Dunedin	25 November 1998	MPC
101462 Tahupotiki	25 November 1998	MPC
101491 Grahamcrombie	1 December 1998	MPC
(108736) 2001 OG_{32}^{(*)}	24 July 2001	MPC
(134483) 1998 WK_{2}	19 November 1998	MPC
(135045) 2001 OF_{32}^{(*)}	24 July 2001	MPC
(155487) 1998 WP_{8}	27 November 1998	MPC
(192609) 1999 GY_{3}	12 April 1999	MPC
^{(*)} in collaboration with N. Brady

In his time at Space Telescope, Griffin contributed to the observation and study of a scientifically significant binary asteroid system, known as 1998 WW31. This was only the second such binary system discovered in the Kuiper belt (the other being the Pluto and Charon system) and provided valuable data helping astronomers understand the mass and behaviour of objects in the Kuiper belt.

Via search programmes using small telescopes, Griffin also discovered 26 numbered minor planets between 1998 and 2001. Three of his discoveries were made in collaboration with Australian astronomer Nigel Brady. His discovery include:

- 10924 Mariagriffin, named after his wife Maria (b. 1962)
- 23990 Springsteen, named after American musician Bruce Springsteen
- 33179 Arsènewenger, named after Arsène Wenger, the former manager of Griffin's favourite football team, Arsenal

However the Mars-crossing asteroid 4995 Griffin is unrelated to him, as it was named after Griffin Swanson the son of its discoverer Steven Roger Swanson.

== Awards and honours ==
In 2015, Griffin was awarded the New Zealand Prime Minister's Science Communication Prize, worth NZD 100,000, for his work at Otago Museum.

In 2019, Griffin was elected a Companion of Royal Society Te Apārangi.
