= (101869) 1999 MM =

Sub-kilometer asteroid on an eccentric orbit

Discovery
- Discovered by: LONEOS
- Discovery site: Anderson Mesa Stn.
- Discovery date: 20 June 1999

Designations
- Minor planet category: Apollo · NEO · PHA

Orbital characteristics
- Epoch 4 September 2017 (JD 2458000.5)
- Uncertainty parameter 0
- Observation arc: 8.67 yr (3,167 days)
- Aphelion: 2.6168 AU
- Perihelion: 0.6319 AU
- Semi-major axis: 1.6243 AU
- Eccentricity: 0.6110
- Orbital period (sidereal): 2.07 yr (756 days)
- Mean anomaly: 254.72°
- Mean motion: 0° 28^{m} 33.96^{s} / day
- Inclination: 4.7642°
- Longitude of ascending node: 110.98°
- Argument of perihelion: 268.77°
- Earth MOID: 0.0016 AU (0.6 LD)

Physical characteristics
- Mean diameter: 370–830 m
- Absolute magnitude (H): 19.3

(101869) 1999 MM is a sub-kilometer asteroid on an eccentric orbit, classified as a near-Earth object and potentially hazardous asteroid of the Apollo group. It was discovered on 20 June 1999, by the Lowell Observatory Near-Earth-Object Search (LONEOS) at its U.S. Anderson Mesa Station in Flagstaff, Arizona. The first observation was made by Catalina Sky Survey just 8 days before its official discovery.

== Orbit and classification ==
The asteroid orbits the Sun at a distance of 0.6–2.6 AU once every 2 years and 1 month (756 days). Its orbit has an eccentricity of 0.61 and an inclination of 5° with respect to the ecliptic. It has a notably low Earth minimum orbit intersection distance of 0.0016 AU (240,000 km), which is less than one lunar distance, and also approaches Mars and Venus to within 15 million kilometers.

1999 MM's orbit is very similar to that of 69230 Hermes, which in 1937 made what was for decades the closest observed approach to Earth by an asteroid. Its nearest pass to Earth within at least a century of present was the 930,000 kilometers one in 1875. In 2090 it passes Venus at 788,000 kilometers.

== Physical characteristics ==
Based on its absolute magnitude of 19.3, its mean diameter is between 370 and 830 meters, assuming an albedo in the range of 0.05 to 0.25.

== Numbering and naming ==
This minor planet was numbered by the Minor Planet Center on 19 October 2005. As of 2018, it has not been named.
