= TM1 (disambiguation) =

TM1 a.k.a. IBM Cognos TM1 is the former brand of IBM Planning Analytics (formerly Applix TM1, formerly Sinper TM/1) enterprise planning software.

TM1 may also refer to:

- Soyuz TM-1, an unmanned test flight of the Soyuz-TM spacecraft
- Convoy TM 1, the code name for an Allied convoy during the Second World War
- Thermal Monitoring 1, a computer central processing unit thermal control
- TM1, a Rolls-Royce Marine Olympus gas turbine

== See also ==
- 1969 TM1, an asteroid from the asteroid belt
- 6291 Renzetti (1985 TM1), a main-belt asteroid
- 5105 Westerhout (1986 TM1), a main-belt asteroid
- (9942) 1989 TM1, a main belt asteroid
- 8660 Sano (1990 TM1), an outer main-belt asteroid
- (16592) 1992 TM1, a minor planet
- (65780) 1995 TM1, a main-belt minor planet
