= Nobuhiro Kawasato =

Japanese astronomer

Minor planets discovered: 105
see § List of discovered minor planets

Nobuhiro Kawasato (川里 信弘, Kawasato Nobuhiro) is a Japanese astronomer credited by the Minor Planet Center with the discovery of 105 asteroids he made partially in collaboration with astronomer Tsutomu Hioki at Okutama Observatory (877), Japan, between 1988 and 2000.

He is also known for the recovery of 724 Hapag in 1988, a long-lost asteroid discovered by Austrian astronomer Johann Palisa in 1911. As of 2016, most of his discoveries, such as the inner main-belt asteroid (9942) 1989 TM1, remain unnamed.

The Mars-crosser asteroid 4910 Kawasato, discovered by German astronomer Karl Reinmuth, was named in his honor on 1 September 1993 (M.P.C. 22504).

== List of discovered minor planets ==
4100 Sumiko	16 January 1988	list^{[A]}
4225 Hobart	31 January 1989	list^{[A]}
4381 Uenohara	22 November 1989	list
4749 Ledzeppelin	22 November 1989	list
4772 Frankdrake	2 November 1989	list^{[A]}
5336 Kley	7 May 1991	list
(5467) 1988 AG	11 January 1988	list^{[A]}
(5512) 1988 VD_{7}	10 November 1988	list^{[A]}
(5525) 1991 TS_{4}	15 October 1991	list
(5752) 1992 CJ	10 February 1992	list
(5776) 1989 UT_{2}	29 October 1989	list^{[A]}
(5874) 1989 XB	2 December 1989	list
(5882) 1992 WW_{5}	18 November 1992	list
6300 Hosamu	30 December 1988	list^{[A]}
(6409) 1992 VC	2 November 1992	list
(7123) 1989 TT_{1}	9 October 1989	list^{[A]}
(7427) 1992 VD	2 November 1992	list
(7466) 1989 VC_{2}	2 November 1989	list^{[A]}
(7471) 1991 YD	28 December 1991	list
(7568) 1988 VJ_{2}	7 November 1988	list^{[A]}

(7836) 1993 TG	9 October 1993	list
(7877) 1992 AH_{1}	10 January 1992	list
(7878) 1992 DZ	27 February 1992	list
(8093) 1992 UZ_{2}	25 October 1992	list
(8350) 1989 AG	2 January 1989	list^{[A]}
(8838) 1989 UW_{2}	29 October 1989	list^{[A]}
(8854) 1991 HC	16 April 1991	list
(9942) 1989 TM1	8 October 1989	list^{[A]}
(9989) 1997 SG_{16}	27 September 1997	list
(10742) 1988 VK_{2}	7 November 1988	list^{[A]}
(11543) 1992 UN_{2}	25 October 1992	list
(11863) 1989 EX	8 March 1989	list^{[A]}
(11894) 1991 GW	3 April 1991	list
(11920) 1992 UY_{2}	25 October 1992	list
(12254) 1988 XJ_{1}	7 December 1988	list^{[A]}
(12330) 1992 UX_{2}	25 October 1992	list
(12331) 1992 UH_{6}	31 October 1992	list
(12332) 1992 UJ_{6}	31 October 1992	list
(12361) 1993 TB	9 October 1993	list
(13135) 1994 QX	31 August 1994	list

(13568) 1992 WL_{3}	21 November 1992	list
(13799) 1998 VC_{34}	14 November 1998	list
(14043) 1995 UA_{45}	20 October 1995	list
(14430) 1992 CH	10 February 1992	list
(14642) 1998 WF_{24}	25 November 1998	list
(14978) 1997 SD_{25}	30 September 1997	list
(15479) 1999 CH_{9}	8 February 1999	list
(15480) 1999 CB_{14}	12 February 1999	list
(16805) 1997 SE_{16}	27 September 1997	list
(16808) 1997 TV_{26}	8 October 1997	list
(16890) 1998 BJ_{33}	29 January 1998	list
(17495) 1992 DY	27 February 1992	list
(21020) 1988 VH_{2}	8 November 1988	list^{[A]}
(24957) 1997 SF_{16}	27 September 1997	list
(25277) 1998 VR_{34}	14 November 1998	list
(25285) 1998 WB_{7}	17 November 1998	list
(25473) 1999 XJ_{38}	3 December 1999	list
(25753) 2000 BC_{14}	28 January 2000	list
(26975) 1997 TY_{24}	8 October 1997	list
(28268) 1999 CA_{14}	8 February 1999	list

(29726) 1999 AH_{26}	9 January 1999	list
(32857) 1992 UG_{6}	31 October 1992	list
(43782) 1989 US_{2}	29 October 1989	list^{[A]}
(44932) 1999 VJ_{40}	5 November 1999	list
(44955) 1999 VS_{72}	5 November 1999	list
(46732) 1997 TD_{19}	8 October 1997	list
(47079) 1998 YA_{3}	16 December 1998	list
(47339) 1999 XH_{38}	3 December 1999	list
(48839) 1998 BZ_{1}	19 January 1998	list
(52659) 1998 BQ_{6}	19 January 1998	list
(53091) 1998 YD_{8}	19 December 1998	list
(53148) 1999 BV_{14}	18 January 1999	list
(53548) 2000 BA_{14}	28 January 2000	list
(56101) 1999 BW_{14}	18 January 1999	list
(59214) 1999 BX_{14}	20 January 1999	list
(60407) 2000 CZ_{1}	2 February 2000	list
(66191) 1998 YS_{6}	19 December 1998	list
(66209) 1999 CC_{14}	12 February 1999	list
(69840) 1998 SM_{10}	16 September 1998	list
(70778) 1999 VH_{40}	5 November 1999	list

(71003) 1999 XD_{38}	3 December 1999	list
(74344) 1998 VD_{34}	14 November 1998	list
(74404) 1998 YU_{11}	19 December 1998	list
(74442) 1999 CJ_{9}	8 February 1999	list
(79352) 1997 AO_{6}	3 January 1997	list
(80700) 2000 CA_{2}	2 February 2000	list
(85858) 1999 AJ_{26}	9 January 1999	list
(92125) 1999 XP_{105}	10 December 1999	list
(100513) 1997 AL_{21}	10 January 1997	list
(101459) 1998 WD_{7}	19 November 1998	list
(118250) 1998 BY_{1}	19 January 1998	list
(118289) 1998 SN_{10}	19 September 1998	list
(121664) 1999 XG_{38}	3 December 1999	list
(129725) 1998 VQ_{34}	14 November 1998	list
(134654) 1999 VK_{40}	13 November 1999	list
(134748) 2000 BF_{14}	28 January 2000	list
(137919) 2000 BD_{14}	28 January 2000	list
(145837) 1998 YZ_{2}	16 December 1998	list
(145844) 1999 AG_{26}	9 January 1999	list
(146008) 2000 CY_{74}	2 February 2000	list

(168445) 1998 YE_{8}	21 December 1998	list
(168472) 1999 PQ_{4}	8 August 1999	list
(192433) 1997 TL_{26}	8 October 1997	list
(202941) 1999 CD_{14}	12 February 1999	list
(257753) 2000 BB_{14}	28 January 2000	list
Co-discovery made with:^{A} T. Hioki
