= List of minor planets: 25001–26000 =

The following is a partial list of minor planets, running from minor-planet number 25001 through 26000, inclusive. The primary data for this and other partial lists is based on JPL's "Small-Body Orbital Elements" and data available from the Minor Planet Center. Critical list information is also provided by the MPC, unless otherwise specified from Lowell Observatory. A detailed description of the table's columns and additional sources are given on the main page including a complete list of every page in this series, and a statistical break-up on the dynamical classification of minor planets.

Also see the summary list of all named bodies in numerical and alphabetical order, and the corresponding naming citations for the number range of this particular list. New namings may only be added to this list after official publication, as the preannouncement of names is condemned by the Working Group for Small Bodies Nomenclature of the International Astronomical Union.

Near-Earth obj.	MBA (inner)	MBA (outer)	Centaur
Mars-crosser	MBA (middle)	Jupiter trojan	Trans-Neptunian obj.
Unclassified

== 25001–25100 ==
Designation			Discovery			Properties		Ref
Permanent	Provisional	Named after	Date	Site	Discoverer(s)	Category	Diam.	Ref
25001 Pacheco	1998 OW_{6}	Pacheco	July 31, 1998	Majorca	Á. López J.	·	8.3 km	MPC · JPL
25002	1998 OP_{7}	—	July 26, 1998	La Silla	E. W. Elst	NYS	4.0 km	MPC · JPL
25003	1998 OZ_{8}	—	July 26, 1998	La Silla	E. W. Elst	·	4.1 km	MPC · JPL
25004	1998 OF_{10}	—	July 26, 1998	La Silla	E. W. Elst	·	2.6 km	MPC · JPL
25005	1998 OU_{12}	—	July 26, 1998	La Silla	E. W. Elst	·	2.5 km	MPC · JPL
25006	1998 OD_{13}	—	July 26, 1998	La Silla	E. W. Elst	·	3.3 km	MPC · JPL
25007	1998 PJ	—	August 5, 1998	Kleť	Kleť	NYS	3.6 km	MPC · JPL
25008	1998 PL	—	August 8, 1998	Woomera	F. B. Zoltowski	·	2.7 km	MPC · JPL
25009	1998 PG_{1}	—	August 15, 1998	Woomera	F. B. Zoltowski	·	2.4 km	MPC · JPL
25010 Guillermotimoner	1998 PL_{1}	Guillermotimoner	August 14, 1998	Majorca	Á. López J., R. Pacheco	·	4.3 km	MPC · JPL
25011	1998 PP_{1}	—	August 13, 1998	Xinglong	SCAP	·	17 km	MPC · JPL
25012	1998 QC	—	August 17, 1998	Višnjan Observatory	Višnjan	·	3.1 km	MPC · JPL
25013	1998 QR	—	August 17, 1998	Kleť	Kleť	·	4.5 km	MPC · JPL
25014 Christinepalau	1998 QT	Christinepalau	August 18, 1998	Les Tardieux Obs.	Boeuf, M.	·	4.0 km	MPC · JPL
25015 Lairdclose	1998 QN_{2}	Lairdclose	August 19, 1998	Haleakala	NEAT	moon	2.9 km	MPC · JPL
25016	1998 QJ_{4}	—	August 18, 1998	Reedy Creek	J. Broughton	NYS	4.4 km	MPC · JPL
25017	1998 QG_{6}	—	August 24, 1998	Caussols	ODAS	·	8.4 km	MPC · JPL
25018 Valbousquet	1998 QN_{6}	Valbousquet	August 24, 1998	Caussols	ODAS	·	3.4 km	MPC · JPL
25019 Walentosky	1998 QO_{10}	Walentosky	August 17, 1998	Socorro	LINEAR	·	3.1 km	MPC · JPL
25020 Tinyacheng	1998 QY_{13}	Tinyacheng	August 17, 1998	Socorro	LINEAR	·	3.4 km	MPC · JPL
25021 Nischaykumar	1998 QV_{17}	Nischaykumar	August 17, 1998	Socorro	LINEAR	moon	2.2 km	MPC · JPL
25022 Hemalibatra	1998 QK_{18}	Hemalibatra	August 17, 1998	Socorro	LINEAR	·	2.6 km	MPC · JPL
25023 Sundaresh	1998 QA_{19}	Sundaresh	August 17, 1998	Socorro	LINEAR	·	2.2 km	MPC · JPL
25024 Calebmcgraw	1998 QL_{19}	Calebmcgraw	August 17, 1998	Socorro	LINEAR	NYS ·	7.6 km	MPC · JPL
25025 Joshuavo	1998 QW_{20}	Joshuavo	August 17, 1998	Socorro	LINEAR	·	3.1 km	MPC · JPL
25026	1998 QF_{23}	—	August 17, 1998	Socorro	LINEAR	·	4.0 km	MPC · JPL
25027	1998 QN_{25}	—	August 17, 1998	Socorro	LINEAR	EUN	4.6 km	MPC · JPL
25028	1998 QL_{26}	—	August 25, 1998	Woomera	F. B. Zoltowski	·	3.2 km	MPC · JPL
25029 Ludwighesse	1998 QO_{28}	Ludwighesse	August 26, 1998	Prescott	P. G. Comba	·	5.5 km	MPC · JPL
25030	1998 QL_{29}	—	August 22, 1998	Xinglong	SCAP	ERI	4.3 km	MPC · JPL
25031	1998 QM_{30}	—	August 23, 1998	Višnjan Observatory	Višnjan	·	4.5 km	MPC · JPL
25032 Randallray	1998 QV_{31}	Randallray	August 17, 1998	Socorro	LINEAR	·	2.5 km	MPC · JPL
25033	1998 QM_{32}	—	August 17, 1998	Socorro	LINEAR	·	4.8 km	MPC · JPL
25034 Lesliemarie	1998 QS_{32}	Lesliemarie	August 17, 1998	Socorro	LINEAR	·	2.5 km	MPC · JPL
25035 Scalesse	1998 QN_{33}	Scalesse	August 17, 1998	Socorro	LINEAR	·	3.2 km	MPC · JPL
25036 Elizabethof	1998 QT_{36}	Elizabethof	August 17, 1998	Socorro	LINEAR	SUL	7.1 km	MPC · JPL
25037	1998 QC_{37}	—	August 17, 1998	Socorro	LINEAR	·	2.9 km	MPC · JPL
25038 Matebezdek	1998 QK_{37}	Matebezdek	August 17, 1998	Socorro	LINEAR	fast	2.7 km	MPC · JPL
25039 Chensun	1998 QF_{38}	Chensun	August 17, 1998	Socorro	LINEAR	V	2.0 km	MPC · JPL
25040	1998 QF_{40}	—	August 17, 1998	Socorro	LINEAR	AGN	4.6 km	MPC · JPL
25041	1998 QX_{40}	—	August 17, 1998	Socorro	LINEAR	·	2.7 km	MPC · JPL
25042 Qiujun	1998 QN_{42}	Qiujun	August 17, 1998	Socorro	LINEAR	·	7.9 km	MPC · JPL
25043 Fangxing	1998 QQ_{42}	Fangxing	August 17, 1998	Socorro	LINEAR	·	4.9 km	MPC · JPL
25044	1998 QE_{43}	—	August 17, 1998	Socorro	LINEAR	·	4.3 km	MPC · JPL
25045 Baixuefei	1998 QU_{43}	Baixuefei	August 17, 1998	Socorro	LINEAR	·	2.5 km	MPC · JPL
25046 Suyihan	1998 QK_{44}	Suyihan	August 17, 1998	Socorro	LINEAR	MAS	2.4 km	MPC · JPL
25047 Tsuitehsin	1998 QN_{44}	Tsuitehsin	August 17, 1998	Socorro	LINEAR	V	2.0 km	MPC · JPL
25048	1998 QJ_{45}	—	August 17, 1998	Socorro	LINEAR	EUN	3.6 km	MPC · JPL
25049 Christofnorn	1998 QS_{45}	Christofnorn	August 17, 1998	Socorro	LINEAR	·	7.2 km	MPC · JPL
25050 Michmadsen	1998 QN_{50}	Michmadsen	August 17, 1998	Socorro	LINEAR	·	3.4 km	MPC · JPL
25051 Vass	1998 QE_{53}	Vass	August 20, 1998	Anderson Mesa	LONEOS	fast	7.7 km	MPC · JPL
25052 Rudawska	1998 QG_{54}	Rudawska	August 27, 1998	Anderson Mesa	LONEOS	(5)	2.3 km	MPC · JPL
25053 Matthewknight	1998 QB_{55}	Matthewknight	August 27, 1998	Anderson Mesa	LONEOS	EOS	6.1 km	MPC · JPL
25054	1998 QN_{55}	—	August 26, 1998	Caussols	ODAS	·	2.3 km	MPC · JPL
25055	1998 QM_{57}	—	August 30, 1998	Kitt Peak	Spacewatch	·	3.5 km	MPC · JPL
25056	1998 QP_{57}	—	August 30, 1998	Kitt Peak	Spacewatch	·	9.1 km	MPC · JPL
25057	1998 QW_{62}	—	August 30, 1998	Xinglong	SCAP	·	6.2 km	MPC · JPL
25058 Shanegould	1998 QO_{63}	Shanegould	August 25, 1998	Reedy Creek	J. Broughton	(5)	3.6 km	MPC · JPL
25059	1998 QA_{69}	—	August 24, 1998	Socorro	LINEAR	·	3.6 km	MPC · JPL
25060	1998 QP_{69}	—	August 24, 1998	Socorro	LINEAR	MAR	3.6 km	MPC · JPL
25061	1998 QQ_{69}	—	August 24, 1998	Socorro	LINEAR	MAR	2.3 km	MPC · JPL
25062 Rasmussen	1998 QH_{71}	Rasmussen	August 24, 1998	Socorro	LINEAR	V	1.8 km	MPC · JPL
25063	1998 QV_{74}	—	August 24, 1998	Socorro	LINEAR	MAR	3.4 km	MPC · JPL
25064	1998 QN_{85}	—	August 24, 1998	Socorro	LINEAR	EUN	6.7 km	MPC · JPL
25065 Lautakkin	1998 QW_{85}	Lautakkin	August 24, 1998	Socorro	LINEAR	·	5.9 km	MPC · JPL
25066	1998 QN_{86}	—	August 24, 1998	Socorro	LINEAR	GEF	5.6 km	MPC · JPL
25067	1998 QW_{86}	—	August 24, 1998	Socorro	LINEAR	EUN	4.3 km	MPC · JPL
25068	1998 QV_{88}	—	August 24, 1998	Socorro	LINEAR	·	5.4 km	MPC · JPL
25069	1998 QF_{89}	—	August 24, 1998	Socorro	LINEAR	EUN	4.0 km	MPC · JPL
25070	1998 QY_{90}	—	August 28, 1998	Socorro	LINEAR	·	3.6 km	MPC · JPL
25071	1998 QN_{92}	—	August 28, 1998	Socorro	LINEAR	·	7.8 km	MPC · JPL
25072	1998 QB_{93}	—	August 28, 1998	Socorro	LINEAR	·	4.3 km	MPC · JPL
25073 Lautakshing	1998 QM_{94}	Lautakshing	August 17, 1998	Socorro	LINEAR	·	2.5 km	MPC · JPL
25074 Honami	1998 QF_{96}	Honami	August 19, 1998	Socorro	LINEAR	·	2.9 km	MPC · JPL
25075 Kiyomoto	1998 QK_{98}	Kiyomoto	August 28, 1998	Socorro	LINEAR	·	4.6 km	MPC · JPL
25076	1998 QM_{98}	—	August 28, 1998	Socorro	LINEAR	H	1.8 km	MPC · JPL
25077	1998 QJ_{99}	—	August 26, 1998	La Silla	E. W. Elst	NYS	4.1 km	MPC · JPL
25078	1998 QV_{99}	—	August 26, 1998	La Silla	E. W. Elst	NYS	1.9 km	MPC · JPL
25079	1998 QU_{103}	—	August 26, 1998	La Silla	E. W. Elst	AGN	5.6 km	MPC · JPL
25080	1998 QX_{103}	—	August 26, 1998	La Silla	E. W. Elst	·	4.7 km	MPC · JPL
25081	1998 QR_{108}	—	August 17, 1998	Socorro	LINEAR	·	3.6 km	MPC · JPL
25082 Williamhodge	1998 RP_{1}	Williamhodge	September 15, 1998	Prescott	P. G. Comba	·	5.2 km	MPC · JPL
25083	1998 RV_{1}	—	September 14, 1998	Catalina	CSS	GEF	5.0 km	MPC · JPL
25084 Jutzi	1998 RP_{5}	Jutzi	September 15, 1998	Anderson Mesa	LONEOS	·	5.1 km	MPC · JPL
25085 Melena	1998 RM_{6}	Melena	September 14, 1998	Anderson Mesa	LONEOS	·	3.4 km	MPC · JPL
25086	1998 RU_{8}	—	September 13, 1998	Kitt Peak	Spacewatch	·	6.3 km	MPC · JPL
25087 Kaztaniguchi	1998 RK_{17}	Kaztaniguchi	September 14, 1998	Socorro	LINEAR	fast	3.3 km	MPC · JPL
25088 Yoshimura	1998 RR_{19}	Yoshimura	September 14, 1998	Socorro	LINEAR	·	3.3 km	MPC · JPL
25089 Sanabria-Rivera	1998 RN_{25}	Sanabria-Rivera	September 14, 1998	Socorro	LINEAR	·	2.7 km	MPC · JPL
25090	1998 RA_{39}	—	September 14, 1998	Socorro	LINEAR	·	3.3 km	MPC · JPL
25091 Sanchez-Claudio	1998 RH_{41}	Sanchez-Claudio	September 14, 1998	Socorro	LINEAR	GEF	3.4 km	MPC · JPL
25092	1998 RV_{42}	—	September 14, 1998	Socorro	LINEAR	·	6.4 km	MPC · JPL
25093 Andmikhaylov	1998 RO_{45}	Andmikhaylov	September 14, 1998	Socorro	LINEAR	·	3.6 km	MPC · JPL
25094 Zemtsov	1998 RF_{46}	Zemtsov	September 14, 1998	Socorro	LINEAR	·	6.5 km	MPC · JPL
25095 Churinov	1998 RT_{46}	Churinov	September 14, 1998	Socorro	LINEAR	V	2.8 km	MPC · JPL
25096	1998 RW_{46}	—	September 14, 1998	Socorro	LINEAR	·	2.5 km	MPC · JPL
25097	1998 RK_{47}	—	September 14, 1998	Socorro	LINEAR	V	3.0 km	MPC · JPL
25098 Gridnev	1998 RQ_{47}	Gridnev	September 14, 1998	Socorro	LINEAR	·	5.4 km	MPC · JPL
25099 Mashinskiy	1998 RS_{47}	Mashinskiy	September 14, 1998	Socorro	LINEAR	·	5.3 km	MPC · JPL
25100 Zhaiweichao	1998 RY_{47}	Zhaiweichao	September 14, 1998	Socorro	LINEAR	·	4.3 km	MPC · JPL

== 25101–25200 ==
back to top

Designation			Discovery			Properties		Ref
Permanent	Provisional	Named after	Date	Site	Discoverer(s)	Category	Diam.	Ref
25101	1998 RJ_{48}	—	September 14, 1998	Socorro	LINEAR	·	9.6 km	MPC · JPL
25102 Zhaoye	1998 RW_{50}	Zhaoye	September 14, 1998	Socorro	LINEAR	·	3.0 km	MPC · JPL
25103 Kimdongyoung	1998 RC_{51}	Kimdongyoung	September 14, 1998	Socorro	LINEAR	·	4.5 km	MPC · JPL
25104 Chohyunghoon	1998 RY_{51}	Chohyunghoon	September 14, 1998	Socorro	LINEAR	·	5.0 km	MPC · JPL
25105 Kimnayeon	1998 RJ_{52}	Kimnayeon	September 14, 1998	Socorro	LINEAR	WIT	3.6 km	MPC · JPL
25106 Ryoojungmin	1998 RC_{53}	Ryoojungmin	September 14, 1998	Socorro	LINEAR	KOR	3.1 km	MPC · JPL
25107	1998 RL_{54}	—	September 14, 1998	Socorro	LINEAR	·	8.2 km	MPC · JPL
25108 Boström	1998 RV_{55}	Boström	September 14, 1998	Socorro	LINEAR	·	6.8 km	MPC · JPL
25109 Hofving	1998 RR_{56}	Hofving	September 14, 1998	Socorro	LINEAR	NYS	3.1 km	MPC · JPL
25110	1998 RC_{61}	—	September 14, 1998	Socorro	LINEAR	EOS	5.4 km	MPC · JPL
25111 Klokun	1998 RG_{64}	Klokun	September 14, 1998	Socorro	LINEAR	·	3.0 km	MPC · JPL
25112 Mymeshkovych	1998 RL_{65}	Mymeshkovych	September 14, 1998	Socorro	LINEAR	KOR	4.4 km	MPC · JPL
25113 Benwasserman	1998 RS_{65}	Benwasserman	September 14, 1998	Socorro	LINEAR	·	3.8 km	MPC · JPL
25114	1998 RJ_{66}	—	September 14, 1998	Socorro	LINEAR	·	3.7 km	MPC · JPL
25115 Drago	1998 RP_{66}	Drago	September 14, 1998	Socorro	LINEAR	·	3.8 km	MPC · JPL
25116 Jonathanwang	1998 RW_{68}	Jonathanwang	September 14, 1998	Socorro	LINEAR	·	2.9 km	MPC · JPL
25117	1998 RX_{68}	—	September 14, 1998	Socorro	LINEAR	·	4.9 km	MPC · JPL
25118 Kevlin	1998 RM_{71}	Kevlin	September 14, 1998	Socorro	LINEAR	MRX	3.3 km	MPC · JPL
25119 Kakani	1998 RA_{72}	Kakani	September 14, 1998	Socorro	LINEAR	·	7.1 km	MPC · JPL
25120 Yvetteleung	1998 RN_{73}	Yvetteleung	September 14, 1998	Socorro	LINEAR	·	2.7 km	MPC · JPL
25121	1998 RL_{75}	—	September 14, 1998	Socorro	LINEAR	·	3.5 km	MPC · JPL
25122 Kaitlingus	1998 RJ_{77}	Kaitlingus	September 14, 1998	Socorro	LINEAR	·	2.7 km	MPC · JPL
25123	1998 RA_{78}	—	September 14, 1998	Socorro	LINEAR	KOR	4.5 km	MPC · JPL
25124 Zahramaarouf	1998 RC_{78}	Zahramaarouf	September 14, 1998	Socorro	LINEAR	AGN	3.5 km	MPC · JPL
25125 Brodallan	1998 RN_{78}	Brodallan	September 14, 1998	Socorro	LINEAR	·	3.6 km	MPC · JPL
25126	1998 RO_{78}	—	September 14, 1998	Socorro	LINEAR	NYS	4.4 km	MPC · JPL
25127 Laurentbrunetto	1998 SZ	Laurentbrunetto	September 16, 1998	Caussols	ODAS	KOR	3.5 km	MPC · JPL
25128	1998 SK_{1}	—	September 16, 1998	Caussols	ODAS	THM	8.0 km	MPC · JPL
25129 Uranoscope	1998 SP_{1}	Uranoscope	September 16, 1998	Caussols	ODAS	·	2.5 km	MPC · JPL
25130	1998 SV_{1}	—	September 16, 1998	Caussols	ODAS	·	8.3 km	MPC · JPL
25131 Katiemelua	1998 SY_{3}	Katiemelua	September 18, 1998	Caussols	ODAS	MRX	3.2 km	MPC · JPL
25132	1998 SO_{9}	—	September 17, 1998	Xinglong	SCAP	slow	8.5 km	MPC · JPL
25133 Douglin	1998 SU_{14}	Douglin	September 18, 1998	Anderson Mesa	LONEOS	(5)	2.4 km	MPC · JPL
25134	1998 SC_{17}	—	September 17, 1998	Kitt Peak	Spacewatch	·	6.8 km	MPC · JPL
25135	1998 SX_{21}	—	September 23, 1998	Višnjan Observatory	Višnjan	·	3.6 km	MPC · JPL
25136	1998 SE_{22}	—	September 23, 1998	Višnjan Observatory	Višnjan	(5)	2.0 km	MPC · JPL
25137 Seansolomon	1998 SS_{23}	Seansolomon	September 17, 1998	Anderson Mesa	LONEOS	·	3.0 km	MPC · JPL
25138 Jaumann	1998 SM_{24}	Jaumann	September 17, 1998	Anderson Mesa	LONEOS	·	4.5 km	MPC · JPL
25139 Roatsch	1998 SN_{25}	Roatsch	September 22, 1998	Anderson Mesa	LONEOS	·	7.6 km	MPC · JPL
25140 Schmedemann	1998 SU_{25}	Schmedemann	September 22, 1998	Anderson Mesa	LONEOS	·	3.8 km	MPC · JPL
25141	1998 SC_{27}	—	September 20, 1998	Xinglong	SCAP	·	2.6 km	MPC · JPL
25142 Hopf	1998 SA_{28}	Hopf	September 26, 1998	Prescott	P. G. Comba	·	4.9 km	MPC · JPL
25143 Itokawa	1998 SF_{36}	Itokawa	September 26, 1998	Socorro	LINEAR	APO · PHA	330 m	MPC · JPL
25144	1998 SC_{43}	—	September 23, 1998	Xinglong	SCAP	·	4.3 km	MPC · JPL
25145	1998 SH_{43}	—	September 23, 1998	Xinglong	SCAP	URS	8.3 km	MPC · JPL
25146 Xiada	1998 SN_{43}	Xiada	September 24, 1998	Xinglong	SCAP	·	3.8 km	MPC · JPL
25147	1998 SZ_{45}	—	September 25, 1998	Kitt Peak	Spacewatch	·	3.5 km	MPC · JPL
25148	1998 SE_{47}	—	September 25, 1998	Kitt Peak	Spacewatch	·	7.0 km	MPC · JPL
25149	1998 SM_{49}	—	September 22, 1998	Bergisch Gladbach	W. Bickel	·	5.5 km	MPC · JPL
25150	1998 SB_{51}	—	September 26, 1998	Kitt Peak	Spacewatch	NYS	2.1 km	MPC · JPL
25151 Stefanschröder	1998 SS_{53}	Stefanschröder	September 16, 1998	Anderson Mesa	LONEOS	·	7.9 km	MPC · JPL
25152 Toplis	1998 SX_{53}	Toplis	September 16, 1998	Anderson Mesa	LONEOS	·	3.7 km	MPC · JPL
25153 Tomhockey	1998 SY_{53}	Tomhockey	September 16, 1998	Anderson Mesa	LONEOS	·	4.1 km	MPC · JPL
25154 Ayers	1998 SZ_{54}	Ayers	September 16, 1998	Anderson Mesa	LONEOS	THM	7.5 km	MPC · JPL
25155 van Belle	1998 SA_{55}	van Belle	September 16, 1998	Anderson Mesa	LONEOS	KOR	3.9 km	MPC · JPL
25156 Shkolnik	1998 SL_{55}	Shkolnik	September 16, 1998	Anderson Mesa	LONEOS	·	4.9 km	MPC · JPL
25157 Fabian	1998 SA_{56}	Fabian	September 16, 1998	Anderson Mesa	LONEOS	THM	5.4 km	MPC · JPL
25158 Berman	1998 SF_{57}	Berman	September 17, 1998	Anderson Mesa	LONEOS	·	4.4 km	MPC · JPL
25159 Michaelwest	1998 SN_{57}	Michaelwest	September 17, 1998	Anderson Mesa	LONEOS	·	11 km	MPC · JPL
25160 Joellama	1998 SN_{58}	Joellama	September 17, 1998	Anderson Mesa	LONEOS	NYS	2.4 km	MPC · JPL
25161 Strosahl	1998 SR_{58}	Strosahl	September 17, 1998	Anderson Mesa	LONEOS	V	3.2 km	MPC · JPL
25162 Beckage	1998 ST_{59}	Beckage	September 17, 1998	Anderson Mesa	LONEOS	NYS	2.9 km	MPC · JPL
25163 Williammcdonald	1998 SC_{60}	Williammcdonald	September 17, 1998	Anderson Mesa	LONEOS	VER	8.4 km	MPC · JPL
25164 Sonomastate	1998 SJ_{62}	Sonomastate	September 19, 1998	Anderson Mesa	LONEOS	·	3.2 km	MPC · JPL
25165 Leget	1998 SK_{62}	Leget	September 19, 1998	Anderson Mesa	LONEOS	·	3.1 km	MPC · JPL
25166 Thompson	1998 SM_{62}	Thompson	September 19, 1998	Anderson Mesa	LONEOS	NAE	8.2 km	MPC · JPL
25167	1998 SO_{64}	—	September 20, 1998	La Silla	E. W. Elst	EUN	2.9 km	MPC · JPL
25168	1998 SC_{65}	—	September 20, 1998	La Silla	E. W. Elst	·	2.9 km	MPC · JPL
25169	1998 SR_{65}	—	September 20, 1998	La Silla	E. W. Elst	·	4.0 km	MPC · JPL
25170	1998 SB_{66}	—	September 20, 1998	La Silla	E. W. Elst	(5)	3.4 km	MPC · JPL
25171	1998 SX_{66}	—	September 20, 1998	La Silla	E. W. Elst	KOR	3.8 km	MPC · JPL
25172	1998 SF_{67}	—	September 20, 1998	La Silla	E. W. Elst	·	5.2 km	MPC · JPL
25173	1998 SN_{71}	—	September 21, 1998	La Silla	E. W. Elst	KOR	5.2 km	MPC · JPL
25174	1998 SQ_{72}	—	September 21, 1998	La Silla	E. W. Elst	EUN	4.1 km	MPC · JPL
25175 Lukeandraka	1998 SX_{75}	Lukeandraka	September 29, 1998	Socorro	LINEAR	·	3.0 km	MPC · JPL
25176 Thomasaunins	1998 ST_{81}	Thomasaunins	September 26, 1998	Socorro	LINEAR	·	2.7 km	MPC · JPL
25177	1998 ST_{84}	—	September 26, 1998	Socorro	LINEAR	·	3.0 km	MPC · JPL
25178 Shreebose	1998 SA_{96}	Shreebose	September 26, 1998	Socorro	LINEAR	NYS	3.6 km	MPC · JPL
25179	1998 SG_{100}	—	September 26, 1998	Socorro	LINEAR	CLO	8.4 km	MPC · JPL
25180 Kenyonconlin	1998 SM_{107}	Kenyonconlin	September 26, 1998	Socorro	LINEAR	·	4.4 km	MPC · JPL
25181	1998 SN_{108}	—	September 26, 1998	Socorro	LINEAR	·	9.5 km	MPC · JPL
25182 Siddhawan	1998 ST_{110}	Siddhawan	September 26, 1998	Socorro	LINEAR	·	4.2 km	MPC · JPL
25183 Grantfisher	1998 SJ_{115}	Grantfisher	September 26, 1998	Socorro	LINEAR	KOR	3.7 km	MPC · JPL
25184 Taylorgaines	1998 SL_{115}	Taylorgaines	September 26, 1998	Socorro	LINEAR	·	3.4 km	MPC · JPL
25185	1998 SR_{115}	—	September 26, 1998	Socorro	LINEAR	·	7.6 km	MPC · JPL
25186	1998 SY_{115}	—	September 26, 1998	Socorro	LINEAR	·	3.6 km	MPC · JPL
25187	1998 SH_{116}	—	September 26, 1998	Socorro	LINEAR	·	5.2 km	MPC · JPL
25188	1998 SR_{117}	—	September 26, 1998	Socorro	LINEAR	·	8.3 km	MPC · JPL
25189 Glockner	1998 SD_{118}	Glockner	September 26, 1998	Socorro	LINEAR	·	2.9 km	MPC · JPL
25190 Thomasgoodin	1998 SM_{118}	Thomasgoodin	September 26, 1998	Socorro	LINEAR	GEF	3.8 km	MPC · JPL
25191 Rachelouise	1998 SE_{123}	Rachelouise	September 26, 1998	Socorro	LINEAR	·	7.0 km	MPC · JPL
25192	1998 SU_{124}	—	September 26, 1998	Socorro	LINEAR	KOR	4.8 km	MPC · JPL
25193 Taliagreene	1998 SV_{126}	Taliagreene	September 26, 1998	Socorro	LINEAR	·	3.9 km	MPC · JPL
25194	1998 ST_{132}	—	September 26, 1998	Socorro	LINEAR	HOF	9.8 km	MPC · JPL
25195	1998 SR_{133}	—	September 26, 1998	Socorro	LINEAR	NYS	3.7 km	MPC · JPL
25196	1998 SH_{134}	—	September 26, 1998	Socorro	LINEAR	THM	8.1 km	MPC · JPL
25197	1998 SX_{137}	—	September 26, 1998	Socorro	LINEAR	KOR	5.2 km	MPC · JPL
25198 Kylienicole	1998 SC_{138}	Kylienicole	September 26, 1998	Socorro	LINEAR	KOR	3.7 km	MPC · JPL
25199 Jiahegu	1998 SB_{139}	Jiahegu	September 26, 1998	Socorro	LINEAR	HOF	11 km	MPC · JPL
25200	1998 SK_{139}	—	September 26, 1998	Socorro	LINEAR	(1118)	9.4 km	MPC · JPL

== 25201–25300 ==
back to top

Designation			Discovery			Properties		Ref
Permanent	Provisional	Named after	Date	Site	Discoverer(s)	Category	Diam.	Ref
25201	1998 SV_{140}	—	September 26, 1998	Socorro	LINEAR	·	3.3 km	MPC · JPL
25202	1998 SW_{140}	—	September 26, 1998	Socorro	LINEAR	KOR	3.6 km	MPC · JPL
25203	1998 SP_{143}	—	September 18, 1998	La Silla	E. W. Elst	AGN	4.0 km	MPC · JPL
25204	1998 SP_{144}	—	September 20, 1998	La Silla	E. W. Elst	·	7.0 km	MPC · JPL
25205	1998 SQ_{144}	—	September 20, 1998	La Silla	E. W. Elst	KOR	5.6 km	MPC · JPL
25206	1998 SX_{145}	—	September 20, 1998	La Silla	E. W. Elst	MRX	3.8 km	MPC · JPL
25207	1998 SY_{145}	—	September 20, 1998	La Silla	E. W. Elst	NYS	3.5 km	MPC · JPL
25208	1998 SK_{146}	—	September 20, 1998	La Silla	E. W. Elst	·	11 km	MPC · JPL
25209	1998 SO_{146}	—	September 20, 1998	La Silla	E. W. Elst	(12739)	5.5 km	MPC · JPL
25210	1998 SE_{147}	—	September 20, 1998	La Silla	E. W. Elst	·	7.7 km	MPC · JPL
25211	1998 SU_{147}	—	September 20, 1998	La Silla	E. W. Elst	·	6.1 km	MPC · JPL
25212 Ayushgupta	1998 SU_{149}	Ayushgupta	September 26, 1998	Socorro	LINEAR	·	2.8 km	MPC · JPL
25213	1998 SP_{159}	—	September 26, 1998	Socorro	LINEAR	·	1.8 km	MPC · JPL
25214	1998 SS_{162}	—	September 26, 1998	Socorro	LINEAR	·	5.0 km	MPC · JPL
25215	1998 SC_{164}	—	September 18, 1998	La Silla	E. W. Elst	·	3.0 km	MPC · JPL
25216 Enricobernardi	1998 TU_{1}	Enricobernardi	October 10, 1998	Pleiade	Castellani, F., Dal Prete, I.	EUN	4.4 km	MPC · JPL
25217	1998 TX_{1}	—	October 13, 1998	Reedy Creek	J. Broughton	·	3.0 km	MPC · JPL
25218	1998 TZ_{1}	—	October 13, 1998	Reedy Creek	J. Broughton	·	6.3 km	MPC · JPL
25219	1998 TM_{5}	—	October 13, 1998	Višnjan Observatory	K. Korlević	·	3.7 km	MPC · JPL
25220	1998 TQ_{6}	—	October 15, 1998	Reedy Creek	J. Broughton	V	2.7 km	MPC · JPL
25221	1998 TJ_{10}	—	October 12, 1998	Kitt Peak	Spacewatch	·	7.5 km	MPC · JPL
25222	1998 TT_{13}	—	October 13, 1998	Kitt Peak	Spacewatch	·	4.1 km	MPC · JPL
25223	1998 TT_{26}	—	October 14, 1998	Kitt Peak	Spacewatch	EOS	5.0 km	MPC · JPL
25224	1998 TD_{27}	—	October 14, 1998	Kitt Peak	Spacewatch	·	4.7 km	MPC · JPL
25225 Patrickbenson	1998 TN_{30}	Patrickbenson	October 10, 1998	Anderson Mesa	LONEOS	MAS	2.5 km	MPC · JPL
25226 Brasch	1998 TP_{30}	Brasch	October 10, 1998	Anderson Mesa	LONEOS	·	3.5 km	MPC · JPL
25227 Genehill	1998 TQ_{30}	Genehill	October 10, 1998	Anderson Mesa	LONEOS	·	3.5 km	MPC · JPL
25228 Mikekitt	1998 TR_{30}	Mikekitt	October 10, 1998	Anderson Mesa	LONEOS	·	6.6 km	MPC · JPL
25229 Karenkitt	1998 TV_{30}	Karenkitt	October 10, 1998	Anderson Mesa	LONEOS	·	3.2 km	MPC · JPL
25230 Borgis	1998 TT_{31}	Borgis	October 11, 1998	Anderson Mesa	LONEOS	·	5.8 km	MPC · JPL
25231 Naylor	1998 TW_{32}	Naylor	October 14, 1998	Anderson Mesa	LONEOS	·	7.1 km	MPC · JPL
25232 Schatz	1998 TN_{33}	Schatz	October 14, 1998	Anderson Mesa	LONEOS	KOR	5.4 km	MPC · JPL
25233 Tallman	1998 TD_{34}	Tallman	October 14, 1998	Anderson Mesa	LONEOS	EOS	6.8 km	MPC · JPL
25234 Odell	1998 TW_{34}	Odell	October 14, 1998	Anderson Mesa	LONEOS	EOS	7.0 km	MPC · JPL
25235	1998 UC_{3}	—	October 20, 1998	Caussols	ODAS	KOR	3.8 km	MPC · JPL
25236	1998 UT_{6}	—	October 18, 1998	Gekko	T. Kagawa	·	5.4 km	MPC · JPL
25237 Hurwitz	1998 UG_{7}	Hurwitz	October 20, 1998	Prescott	P. G. Comba	·	7.2 km	MPC · JPL
25238	1998 UJ_{7}	—	October 21, 1998	Višnjan Observatory	K. Korlević	·	4.4 km	MPC · JPL
25239	1998 UB_{8}	—	October 23, 1998	Višnjan Observatory	K. Korlević	·	6.8 km	MPC · JPL
25240 Qiansanqiang	1998 UO_{8}	Qiansanqiang	October 16, 1998	Xinglong	SCAP	HOF	10 km	MPC · JPL
25241	1998 UF_{14}	—	October 23, 1998	Kitt Peak	Spacewatch	KOR	6.0 km	MPC · JPL
25242	1998 UH_{15}	—	October 20, 1998	Granville	Davis, R. G.	EUN	5.4 km	MPC · JPL
25243	1998 UQ_{15}	—	October 23, 1998	Višnjan Observatory	K. Korlević	·	5.6 km	MPC · JPL
25244	1998 UV_{15}	—	October 24, 1998	Višnjan Observatory	K. Korlević	NYS	2.4 km	MPC · JPL
25245	1998 UW_{18}	—	October 26, 1998	Višnjan Observatory	K. Korlević	HYG	9.0 km	MPC · JPL
25246	1998 UX_{18}	—	October 26, 1998	Višnjan Observatory	K. Korlević	KOR	5.0 km	MPC · JPL
25247	1998 UW_{19}	—	October 23, 1998	Višnjan Observatory	K. Korlević	·	4.3 km	MPC · JPL
25248	1998 UX_{19}	—	October 24, 1998	Višnjan Observatory	K. Korlević	THM	7.7 km	MPC · JPL
25249	1998 UV_{22}	—	October 31, 1998	Gekko	T. Kagawa	·	7.7 km	MPC · JPL
25250 Jonnapeterson	1998 UX_{23}	Jonnapeterson	October 17, 1998	Anderson Mesa	LONEOS	·	2.8 km	MPC · JPL
25251	1998 UL_{25}	—	October 18, 1998	La Silla	E. W. Elst	·	3.0 km	MPC · JPL
25252	1998 UC_{26}	—	October 18, 1998	La Silla	E. W. Elst	·	4.7 km	MPC · JPL
25253	1998 UV_{29}	—	October 18, 1998	La Silla	E. W. Elst	GEF	5.0 km	MPC · JPL
25254	1998 UM_{32}	—	October 29, 1998	Xinglong	SCAP	EOS	5.8 km	MPC · JPL
25255	1998 UX_{32}	—	October 28, 1998	Socorro	LINEAR	·	6.6 km	MPC · JPL
25256 Imbrie-Moore	1998 UG_{34}	Imbrie-Moore	October 28, 1998	Socorro	LINEAR	NYS	4.2 km	MPC · JPL
25257 Elizmakarron	1998 UF_{42}	Elizmakarron	October 28, 1998	Socorro	LINEAR	·	3.3 km	MPC · JPL
25258 Nathaniel	1998 VU	Nathaniel	November 7, 1998	Kleť	M. Tichý, J. Tichá	EOS	5.9 km	MPC · JPL
25259 Lucarnold	1998 VK_{4}	Lucarnold	November 11, 1998	Caussols	ODAS	·	4.6 km	MPC · JPL
25260	1998 VN_{5}	—	November 8, 1998	Nachi-Katsuura	Y. Shimizu, T. Urata	·	10 km	MPC · JPL
25261	1998 VX_{5}	—	November 11, 1998	Gekko	T. Kagawa	·	8.0 km	MPC · JPL
25262	1998 VL_{14}	—	November 10, 1998	Socorro	LINEAR	·	4.3 km	MPC · JPL
25263	1998 VM_{16}	—	November 10, 1998	Socorro	LINEAR	·	17 km	MPC · JPL
25264 Erickeen	1998 VP_{16}	Erickeen	November 10, 1998	Socorro	LINEAR	·	4.7 km	MPC · JPL
25265	1998 VR_{17}	—	November 10, 1998	Socorro	LINEAR	NYS	4.1 km	MPC · JPL
25266 Taylorkinyon	1998 VS_{20}	Taylorkinyon	November 10, 1998	Socorro	LINEAR	MAS	1.9 km	MPC · JPL
25267	1998 VH_{21}	—	November 10, 1998	Socorro	LINEAR	PAD	8.1 km	MPC · JPL
25268	1998 VP_{23}	—	November 10, 1998	Socorro	LINEAR	EOS	6.9 km	MPC · JPL
25269	1998 VY_{23}	—	November 10, 1998	Socorro	LINEAR	NYS	4.1 km	MPC · JPL
25270	1998 VR_{27}	—	November 10, 1998	Socorro	LINEAR	(1298)	17 km	MPC · JPL
25271	1998 VT_{27}	—	November 10, 1998	Socorro	LINEAR	EOS	6.4 km	MPC · JPL
25272	1998 VK_{32}	—	November 14, 1998	Reedy Creek	J. Broughton	fast	3.6 km	MPC · JPL
25273 Barrycarole	1998 VN_{32}	Barrycarole	November 15, 1998	Cocoa	I. P. Griffin	KOR	5.3 km	MPC · JPL
25274	1998 VE_{33}	—	November 15, 1998	Reedy Creek	J. Broughton	EUN	5.3 km	MPC · JPL
25275 Jocelynbell	1998 VF_{33}	Jocelynbell	November 14, 1998	Goodricke-Pigott	R. A. Tucker	·	3.5 km	MPC · JPL
25276 Dimai	1998 VJ_{33}	Dimai	November 15, 1998	Pianoro	V. Goretti	EOS	5.1 km	MPC · JPL
25277	1998 VR_{34}	—	November 14, 1998	Uenohara	N. Kawasato	KOR	3.4 km	MPC · JPL
25278	1998 VD_{51}	—	November 13, 1998	Socorro	LINEAR	·	3.8 km	MPC · JPL
25279	1998 VF_{52}	—	November 13, 1998	Socorro	LINEAR	·	3.0 km	MPC · JPL
25280	1998 VY_{53}	—	November 14, 1998	Socorro	LINEAR	EOS	6.4 km	MPC · JPL
25281	1998 WP	—	November 16, 1998	High Point	D. K. Chesney	·	13 km	MPC · JPL
25282	1998 WR	—	November 18, 1998	Socorro	LINEAR	EUN	7.7 km	MPC · JPL
25283	1998 WU	—	November 17, 1998	Oizumi	T. Kobayashi	·	5.0 km	MPC · JPL
25284	1998 WL_{2}	—	November 17, 1998	Catalina	CSS	·	9.6 km	MPC · JPL
25285	1998 WB_{7}	—	November 17, 1998	Uenohara	N. Kawasato	KOR ·	7.6 km	MPC · JPL
25286	1998 WC_{8}	—	November 18, 1998	Kushiro	S. Ueda, H. Kaneda	·	7.9 km	MPC · JPL
25287	1998 WR_{9}	—	November 28, 1998	Višnjan Observatory	K. Korlević	·	7.2 km	MPC · JPL
25288	1998 WM_{10}	—	November 21, 1998	Socorro	LINEAR	·	4.4 km	MPC · JPL
25289	1998 WE_{12}	—	November 21, 1998	Socorro	LINEAR	KOR	6.2 km	MPC · JPL
25290 Vibhuti	1998 WH_{14}	Vibhuti	November 21, 1998	Socorro	LINEAR	·	3.6 km	MPC · JPL
25291	1998 WO_{16}	—	November 21, 1998	Socorro	LINEAR	·	7.0 km	MPC · JPL
25292	1998 WQ_{16}	—	November 21, 1998	Socorro	LINEAR	·	9.7 km	MPC · JPL
25293	1998 WS_{16}	—	November 21, 1998	Socorro	LINEAR	KOR	5.1 km	MPC · JPL
25294 Johnlaberee	1998 WA_{17}	Johnlaberee	November 21, 1998	Socorro	LINEAR	·	7.3 km	MPC · JPL
25295	1998 WK_{17}	—	November 21, 1998	Socorro	LINEAR	·	15 km	MPC · JPL
25296 Minamisatsuma	1998 WD_{20}	Minamisatsuma	November 26, 1998	Kashihara	F. Uto	THM	9.4 km	MPC · JPL
25297	1998 WW_{20}	—	November 18, 1998	Socorro	LINEAR	EOS	6.8 km	MPC · JPL
25298 Fionapaine	1998 WB_{22}	Fionapaine	November 18, 1998	Socorro	LINEAR	KOR	5.0 km	MPC · JPL
25299	1998 WX_{22}	—	November 18, 1998	Socorro	LINEAR	·	3.4 km	MPC · JPL
25300 Andyromine	1998 WE_{23}	Andyromine	November 18, 1998	Socorro	LINEAR	(21344)	4.0 km	MPC · JPL

== 25301–25400 ==
back to top

Designation			Discovery			Properties		Ref
Permanent	Provisional	Named after	Date	Site	Discoverer(s)	Category	Diam.	Ref
25301 Ambrofogar	1998 XZ_{2}	Ambrofogar	December 7, 1998	San Marcello	M. Tombelli, A. Boattini	·	5.8 km	MPC · JPL
25302 Niim	1998 XW_{3}	Niim	December 9, 1998	Chichibu	N. Satō	EOS	12 km	MPC · JPL
25303	1998 XE_{17}	—	December 8, 1998	Caussols	ODAS	·	15 km	MPC · JPL
25304	1998 XQ_{28}	—	December 14, 1998	Socorro	LINEAR	KOR	4.4 km	MPC · JPL
25305	1998 XH_{62}	—	December 9, 1998	Socorro	LINEAR	·	4.2 km	MPC · JPL
25306	1998 XQ_{73}	—	December 14, 1998	Socorro	LINEAR	·	21 km	MPC · JPL
25307	1998 XU_{77}	—	December 15, 1998	Socorro	LINEAR	EOS	6.8 km	MPC · JPL
25308	1998 XW_{82}	—	December 15, 1998	Socorro	LINEAR	EOS	6.6 km	MPC · JPL
25309 Chrisauer	1998 XQ_{87}	Chrisauer	December 15, 1998	Socorro	LINEAR	·	3.6 km	MPC · JPL
25310	1998 XY_{92}	—	December 15, 1998	Socorro	LINEAR	·	15 km	MPC · JPL
25311	1998 YV_{3}	—	December 17, 1998	Ondřejov	Rezek, T., P. Pravec	·	6.8 km	MPC · JPL
25312 Asiapossenti	1998 YU_{6}	Asiapossenti	December 22, 1998	Colleverde	V. S. Casulli	·	18 km	MPC · JPL
25313	1998 YV_{8}	—	December 22, 1998	Xinglong	SCAP	·	5.9 km	MPC · JPL
25314	1999 AK_{3}	—	January 8, 1999	Socorro	LINEAR	slow	8.4 km	MPC · JPL
25315	1999 AZ_{8}	—	January 9, 1999	Xinglong	SCAP	(5)	3.4 km	MPC · JPL
25316 Comnick	1999 AH_{23}	Comnick	January 10, 1999	Anderson Mesa	LONEOS	·	7.9 km	MPC · JPL
25317	1999 BL_{12}	—	January 24, 1999	Črni Vrh	Mikuž, H.	·	4.6 km	MPC · JPL
25318	1999 CH_{12}	—	February 12, 1999	Socorro	LINEAR	H	2.1 km	MPC · JPL
25319	1999 CT_{14}	—	February 15, 1999	Višnjan Observatory	K. Korlević	PHO	7.5 km	MPC · JPL
25320	1999 CP_{15}	—	February 11, 1999	Socorro	LINEAR	H	2.4 km	MPC · JPL
25321 Rohitsingh	1999 FR_{27}	Rohitsingh	March 19, 1999	Socorro	LINEAR	·	6.4 km	MPC · JPL
25322 Rebeccajean	1999 FM_{28}	Rebeccajean	March 19, 1999	Socorro	LINEAR	·	3.4 km	MPC · JPL
25323	1999 FC_{34}	—	March 19, 1999	Socorro	LINEAR	·	2.5 km	MPC · JPL
25324	1999 GQ_{4}	—	April 10, 1999	Višnjan Observatory	K. Korlević	·	8.3 km	MPC · JPL
25325	1999 JS_{5}	—	May 10, 1999	Socorro	LINEAR	H	2.3 km	MPC · JPL
25326 Lawrencesun	1999 JB_{32}	Lawrencesun	May 10, 1999	Socorro	LINEAR	KOR	3.8 km	MPC · JPL
25327	1999 JB_{63}	—	May 10, 1999	Socorro	LINEAR	PHO	4.4 km	MPC · JPL
25328	1999 JK_{83}	—	May 12, 1999	Socorro	LINEAR	PHO	3.5 km	MPC · JPL
25329	1999 JO_{84}	—	May 12, 1999	Socorro	LINEAR	·	3.9 km	MPC · JPL
25330	1999 KV_{4}	—	May 17, 1999	Catalina	CSS	APO +1km	3.2 km	MPC · JPL
25331 Berrevoets	1999 KY_{4}	Berrevoets	May 20, 1999	Oaxaca	Roe, J. M.	·	6.5 km	MPC · JPL
25332	1999 KK_{6}	—	May 17, 1999	Socorro	LINEAR	H	3.3 km	MPC · JPL
25333 Britwenger	1999 KW_{13}	Britwenger	May 18, 1999	Socorro	LINEAR	·	2.4 km	MPC · JPL
25334	1999 LK_{11}	—	June 8, 1999	Socorro	LINEAR	·	4.3 km	MPC · JPL
25335	1999 NT	—	July 9, 1999	Les Tardieux Obs.	Boeuf, M.	·	4.7 km	MPC · JPL
25336	1999 OR_{2}	—	July 22, 1999	Socorro	LINEAR	PHO	4.0 km	MPC · JPL
25337 Elisabetta	1999 PK	Elisabetta	August 6, 1999	Ceccano	G. Masi	H	1.5 km	MPC · JPL
25338	1999 RE_{2}	—	September 6, 1999	Fountain Hills	C. W. Juels	·	4.6 km	MPC · JPL
25339	1999 RE_{27}	—	September 7, 1999	Socorro	LINEAR	H	1.7 km	MPC · JPL
25340 Segoves	1999 RX_{31}	Segoves	September 10, 1999	Kleť	M. Tichý, Z. Moravec	H	1.3 km	MPC · JPL
25341	1999 RT_{38}	—	September 13, 1999	Višnjan Observatory	K. Korlević	·	2.2 km	MPC · JPL
25342	1999 RQ_{42}	—	September 14, 1999	Višnjan Observatory	K. Korlević	EUN	4.8 km	MPC · JPL
25343	1999 RA_{44}	—	September 15, 1999	Višnjan Observatory	K. Korlević	slow	3.8 km	MPC · JPL
25344	1999 RN_{72}	—	September 7, 1999	Socorro	LINEAR	L5	23 km	MPC · JPL
25345	1999 RW_{88}	—	September 7, 1999	Socorro	LINEAR	·	1.8 km	MPC · JPL
25346	1999 RS_{103}	—	September 8, 1999	Socorro	LINEAR	·	5.3 km	MPC · JPL
25347	1999 RQ_{116}	—	September 9, 1999	Socorro	LINEAR	L5	29 km	MPC · JPL
25348 Wisniowiecki	1999 RJ_{124}	Wisniowiecki	September 9, 1999	Socorro	LINEAR	·	2.4 km	MPC · JPL
25349	1999 RL_{127}	—	September 9, 1999	Socorro	LINEAR	EUN	5.6 km	MPC · JPL
25350	1999 RB_{143}	—	September 9, 1999	Socorro	LINEAR	·	1.6 km	MPC · JPL
25351	1999 RK_{173}	—	September 9, 1999	Socorro	LINEAR	·	3.2 km	MPC · JPL
25352	1999 RQ_{201}	—	September 8, 1999	Socorro	LINEAR	EUN	3.5 km	MPC · JPL
25353	1999 RB_{210}	—	September 8, 1999	Socorro	LINEAR	·	2.8 km	MPC · JPL
25354 Zdasiuk	1999 RD_{211}	Zdasiuk	September 8, 1999	Socorro	LINEAR	(2076)	3.1 km	MPC · JPL
25355	1999 RU_{221}	—	September 5, 1999	Catalina	CSS	·	2.8 km	MPC · JPL
25356	1999 SK_{6}	—	September 30, 1999	Socorro	LINEAR	·	10 km	MPC · JPL
25357	1999 TM	—	October 1, 1999	Zeno	T. Stafford	·	4.9 km	MPC · JPL
25358 Boskovice	1999 TY_{3}	Boskovice	October 2, 1999	Ondřejov	L. Kotková	·	2.7 km	MPC · JPL
25359	1999 TW_{11}	—	October 10, 1999	Višnjan Observatory	K. Korlević, M. Jurić	·	3.3 km	MPC · JPL
25360	1999 TK_{14}	—	October 10, 1999	Višnjan Observatory	K. Korlević, M. Jurić	NYS	3.2 km	MPC · JPL
25361	1999 TC_{23}	—	October 3, 1999	Kitt Peak	Spacewatch	MAS	3.0 km	MPC · JPL
25362	1999 TH_{24}	—	October 4, 1999	Kitt Peak	Spacewatch	·	2.7 km	MPC · JPL
25363	1999 TW_{24}	—	October 2, 1999	Socorro	LINEAR	NYS	2.8 km	MPC · JPL
25364 Allisonbaas	1999 TD_{26}	Allisonbaas	October 3, 1999	Socorro	LINEAR	·	4.4 km	MPC · JPL
25365 Bernreuter	1999 TC_{27}	Bernreuter	October 3, 1999	Socorro	LINEAR	·	4.8 km	MPC · JPL
25366 Maureenbobo	1999 TH_{30}	Maureenbobo	October 4, 1999	Socorro	LINEAR	NYS	4.2 km	MPC · JPL
25367 Cicek	1999 TC_{96}	Cicek	October 2, 1999	Socorro	LINEAR	·	5.2 km	MPC · JPL
25368 Gailcolwell	1999 TQ_{96}	Gailcolwell	October 2, 1999	Socorro	LINEAR	·	3.9 km	MPC · JPL
25369 Dawndonovan	1999 TR_{108}	Dawndonovan	October 4, 1999	Socorro	LINEAR	·	2.4 km	MPC · JPL
25370 Karenfletch	1999 TW_{144}	Karenfletch	October 7, 1999	Socorro	LINEAR	·	3.4 km	MPC · JPL
25371 Frangaley	1999 TS_{153}	Frangaley	October 7, 1999	Socorro	LINEAR	·	3.0 km	MPC · JPL
25372 Shanagarza	1999 TB_{164}	Shanagarza	October 9, 1999	Socorro	LINEAR	V	2.0 km	MPC · JPL
25373 Gorsch	1999 TC_{166}	Gorsch	October 10, 1999	Socorro	LINEAR	·	2.3 km	MPC · JPL
25374 Harbrucker	1999 TC_{178}	Harbrucker	October 10, 1999	Socorro	LINEAR	·	2.8 km	MPC · JPL
25375 Treenajoi	1999 TR_{180}	Treenajoi	October 10, 1999	Socorro	LINEAR	·	2.6 km	MPC · JPL
25376 Christikeen	1999 TS_{180}	Christikeen	October 10, 1999	Socorro	LINEAR	NYS ·	5.7 km	MPC · JPL
25377 Rolaberee	1999 TZ_{196}	Rolaberee	October 12, 1999	Socorro	LINEAR	·	2.6 km	MPC · JPL
25378 Erinlambert	1999 TY_{197}	Erinlambert	October 12, 1999	Socorro	LINEAR	·	2.8 km	MPC · JPL
25379	1999 TL_{210}	—	October 14, 1999	Socorro	LINEAR	·	5.8 km	MPC · JPL
25380	1999 TA_{212}	—	October 15, 1999	Socorro	LINEAR	·	1.6 km	MPC · JPL
25381 Jerrynelson	1999 TE_{213}	Jerrynelson	October 15, 1999	Socorro	LINEAR	·	4.3 km	MPC · JPL
25382	1999 TK_{226}	—	October 3, 1999	Kitt Peak	Spacewatch	·	2.5 km	MPC · JPL
25383 Lindacker	1999 UN_{1}	Lindacker	October 18, 1999	Kleť	Kleť	·	3.1 km	MPC · JPL
25384 Partizánske	1999 UW_{1}	Partizánske	October 18, 1999	Ondřejov	P. Kušnirák	·	10 km	MPC · JPL
25385	1999 UC_{3}	—	October 20, 1999	Gekko	T. Kagawa	·	6.2 km	MPC · JPL
25386	1999 UE_{3}	—	October 17, 1999	Bergisch Gladbach	W. Bickel	·	2.7 km	MPC · JPL
25387	1999 UN_{3}	—	October 16, 1999	Višnjan Observatory	K. Korlević	V	2.2 km	MPC · JPL
25388	1999 UG_{4}	—	October 31, 1999	Oaxaca	Roe, J. M.	NYS	3.3 km	MPC · JPL
25389	1999 UJ_{9}	—	October 29, 1999	Catalina	CSS	(7744)	3.3 km	MPC · JPL
25390	1999 UU_{10}	—	October 31, 1999	Socorro	LINEAR	·	7.0 km	MPC · JPL
25391	1999 UC_{16}	—	October 29, 1999	Catalina	CSS	·	3.9 km	MPC · JPL
25392	1999 UC_{26}	—	October 30, 1999	Catalina	CSS	·	2.8 km	MPC · JPL
25393	1999 UK_{26}	—	October 30, 1999	Catalina	CSS	·	3.2 km	MPC · JPL
25394	1999 UQ_{48}	—	October 30, 1999	Catalina	CSS	·	2.8 km	MPC · JPL
25395	1999 VF_{6}	—	November 5, 1999	Oizumi	T. Kobayashi	·	3.3 km	MPC · JPL
25396	1999 VL_{10}	—	November 9, 1999	Oizumi	T. Kobayashi	·	4.0 km	MPC · JPL
25397	1999 VY_{10}	—	November 7, 1999	Gnosca	S. Sposetti	·	3.0 km	MPC · JPL
25398	1999 VM_{12}	—	November 11, 1999	Fountain Hills	C. W. Juels	·	5.6 km	MPC · JPL
25399 Vonnegut	1999 VN_{20}	Vonnegut	November 11, 1999	Fountain Hills	C. W. Juels	·	6.8 km	MPC · JPL
25400	1999 VU_{20}	—	November 9, 1999	Nachi-Katsuura	Y. Shimizu, T. Urata	·	3.6 km	MPC · JPL

== 25401–25500 ==
back to top

Designation			Discovery			Properties		Ref
Permanent	Provisional	Named after	Date	Site	Discoverer(s)	Category	Diam.	Ref
25401	1999 VY_{24}	—	November 13, 1999	Oizumi	T. Kobayashi	·	4.3 km	MPC · JPL
25402 Angelanorse	1999 VA_{27}	Angelanorse	November 3, 1999	Socorro	LINEAR	·	2.8 km	MPC · JPL
25403 Carlapiazza	1999 VE_{31}	Carlapiazza	November 3, 1999	Socorro	LINEAR	·	2.6 km	MPC · JPL
25404 Shansample	1999 VU_{31}	Shansample	November 3, 1999	Socorro	LINEAR	·	3.1 km	MPC · JPL
25405 Jeffwidder	1999 VM_{32}	Jeffwidder	November 3, 1999	Socorro	LINEAR	NYS	3.2 km	MPC · JPL
25406 Debwysocki	1999 VR_{32}	Debwysocki	November 3, 1999	Socorro	LINEAR	·	2.6 km	MPC · JPL
25407	1999 VM_{34}	—	November 3, 1999	Socorro	LINEAR	EUN	4.8 km	MPC · JPL
25408	1999 VB_{35}	—	November 3, 1999	Socorro	LINEAR	·	3.1 km	MPC · JPL
25409	1999 VD_{36}	—	November 3, 1999	Socorro	LINEAR	EUN	8.5 km	MPC · JPL
25410 Abejar	1999 VG_{36}	Abejar	November 3, 1999	Socorro	LINEAR	·	2.5 km	MPC · JPL
25411	1999 VM_{37}	—	November 3, 1999	Socorro	LINEAR	·	4.4 km	MPC · JPL
25412 Arbesfeld	1999 VZ_{38}	Arbesfeld	November 10, 1999	Socorro	LINEAR	·	3.7 km	MPC · JPL
25413 Dorischen	1999 VE_{39}	Dorischen	November 10, 1999	Socorro	LINEAR	·	2.9 km	MPC · JPL
25414 Cherkassky	1999 VH_{48}	Cherkassky	November 3, 1999	Socorro	LINEAR	·	4.2 km	MPC · JPL
25415 Jocelyn	1999 VL_{53}	Jocelyn	November 3, 1999	Socorro	LINEAR	·	3.7 km	MPC · JPL
25416 Chyanwen	1999 VY_{58}	Chyanwen	November 4, 1999	Socorro	LINEAR	·	2.6 km	MPC · JPL
25417 Coquillette	1999 VZ_{65}	Coquillette	November 4, 1999	Socorro	LINEAR	·	2.5 km	MPC · JPL
25418 Deshmukh	1999 VG_{66}	Deshmukh	November 4, 1999	Socorro	LINEAR	NYS	2.6 km	MPC · JPL
25419	1999 VC_{72}	—	November 11, 1999	Xinglong	SCAP	·	2.9 km	MPC · JPL
25420	1999 VN_{81}	—	November 5, 1999	Socorro	LINEAR	·	3.2 km	MPC · JPL
25421 Gafaran	1999 VL_{86}	Gafaran	November 5, 1999	Socorro	LINEAR	·	2.8 km	MPC · JPL
25422 Abigreene	1999 VL_{111}	Abigreene	November 9, 1999	Socorro	LINEAR	·	3.1 km	MPC · JPL
25423	1999 VS_{127}	—	November 9, 1999	Kitt Peak	Spacewatch	·	1.7 km	MPC · JPL
25424 Gunasekaran	1999 VQ_{158}	Gunasekaran	November 14, 1999	Socorro	LINEAR	(5)	3.1 km	MPC · JPL
25425 Chelsealynn	1999 VR_{169}	Chelsealynn	November 14, 1999	Socorro	LINEAR	·	2.6 km	MPC · JPL
25426 Alexanderkim	1999 VU_{169}	Alexanderkim	November 14, 1999	Socorro	LINEAR	·	1.8 km	MPC · JPL
25427 Kratchmarov	1999 VP_{170}	Kratchmarov	November 14, 1999	Socorro	LINEAR	·	4.6 km	MPC · JPL
25428 Lakhanpal	1999 VM_{172}	Lakhanpal	November 14, 1999	Socorro	LINEAR	·	2.4 km	MPC · JPL
25429	1999 VM_{187}	—	November 15, 1999	Socorro	LINEAR	·	3.8 km	MPC · JPL
25430 Ericlarson	1999 VT_{189}	Ericlarson	November 15, 1999	Socorro	LINEAR	·	3.3 km	MPC · JPL
25431	1999 VW_{194}	—	November 2, 1999	Catalina	CSS	·	2.2 km	MPC · JPL
25432 Josepherli	1999 VG_{225}	Josepherli	November 5, 1999	Socorro	LINEAR	·	2.4 km	MPC · JPL
25433	1999 WM_{2}	—	November 26, 1999	Višnjan Observatory	K. Korlević	·	2.6 km	MPC · JPL
25434 Westonia	1999 WS_{2}	Westonia	November 29, 1999	Kleť	M. Tichý	·	2.0 km	MPC · JPL
25435	1999 WX_{3}	—	November 28, 1999	Oizumi	T. Kobayashi	·	2.8 km	MPC · JPL
25436	1999 WE_{4}	—	November 28, 1999	Oizumi	T. Kobayashi	·	4.4 km	MPC · JPL
25437	1999 WP_{4}	—	November 28, 1999	Oizumi	T. Kobayashi	V	3.1 km	MPC · JPL
25438	1999 WY_{5}	—	November 30, 1999	Socorro	LINEAR	·	3.9 km	MPC · JPL
25439	1999 WV_{6}	—	November 28, 1999	Višnjan Observatory	K. Korlević	·	2.7 km	MPC · JPL
25440	1999 WR_{7}	—	November 28, 1999	Višnjan Observatory	K. Korlević	·	3.1 km	MPC · JPL
25441	1999 WG_{8}	—	November 28, 1999	Kvistaberg	Uppsala-DLR Asteroid Survey	·	2.7 km	MPC · JPL
25442	1999 WQ_{9}	—	November 30, 1999	Oizumi	T. Kobayashi	·	9.0 km	MPC · JPL
25443	1999 WC_{10}	—	November 30, 1999	Oizumi	T. Kobayashi	·	8.4 km	MPC · JPL
25444	1999 WL_{13}	—	November 29, 1999	Višnjan Observatory	K. Korlević	·	2.5 km	MPC · JPL
25445	1999 XK_{1}	—	December 2, 1999	Oizumi	T. Kobayashi	·	3.9 km	MPC · JPL
25446	1999 XF_{2}	—	December 4, 1999	Gekko	T. Kagawa	·	2.3 km	MPC · JPL
25447	1999 XE_{4}	—	December 4, 1999	Catalina	CSS	·	1.7 km	MPC · JPL
25448	1999 XJ_{4}	—	December 4, 1999	Catalina	CSS	NYS	3.5 km	MPC · JPL
25449	1999 XN_{6}	—	December 4, 1999	Catalina	CSS	(5)	3.3 km	MPC · JPL
25450	1999 XQ_{7}	—	December 4, 1999	Fountain Hills	C. W. Juels	·	5.3 km	MPC · JPL
25451	1999 XC_{8}	—	December 3, 1999	Oizumi	T. Kobayashi	·	4.8 km	MPC · JPL
25452	1999 XS_{10}	—	December 5, 1999	Catalina	CSS	·	2.1 km	MPC · JPL
25453	1999 XU_{11}	—	December 6, 1999	Catalina	CSS	·	15 km	MPC · JPL
25454	1999 XN_{12}	—	December 5, 1999	Socorro	LINEAR	·	4.5 km	MPC · JPL
25455 Anissamak	1999 XP_{12}	Anissamak	December 5, 1999	Socorro	LINEAR	·	4.3 km	MPC · JPL
25456 Caitlinmann	1999 XQ_{12}	Caitlinmann	December 5, 1999	Socorro	LINEAR	·	3.3 km	MPC · JPL
25457 Mariannamao	1999 XH_{13}	Mariannamao	December 5, 1999	Socorro	LINEAR	·	6.0 km	MPC · JPL
25458	1999 XT_{13}	—	December 5, 1999	Socorro	LINEAR	·	4.9 km	MPC · JPL
25459	1999 XL_{14}	—	December 5, 1999	Socorro	LINEAR	EOS	8.6 km	MPC · JPL
25460	1999 XX_{15}	—	December 6, 1999	Višnjan Observatory	K. Korlević	·	2.5 km	MPC · JPL
25461	1999 XR_{18}	—	December 3, 1999	Socorro	LINEAR	·	4.8 km	MPC · JPL
25462 Haydenmetsky	1999 XV_{18}	Haydenmetsky	December 3, 1999	Socorro	LINEAR	·	4.2 km	MPC · JPL
25463	1999 XJ_{21}	—	December 5, 1999	Socorro	LINEAR	·	4.6 km	MPC · JPL
25464 Maxrabinovich	1999 XA_{24}	Maxrabinovich	December 6, 1999	Socorro	LINEAR	BAP	3.5 km	MPC · JPL
25465 Rajagopalan	1999 XT_{25}	Rajagopalan	December 6, 1999	Socorro	LINEAR	·	3.1 km	MPC · JPL
25466	1999 XG_{31}	—	December 6, 1999	Socorro	LINEAR	·	7.4 km	MPC · JPL
25467	1999 XV_{32}	—	December 6, 1999	Socorro	LINEAR	ADE	11 km	MPC · JPL
25468 Ramakrishna	1999 XS_{33}	Ramakrishna	December 6, 1999	Socorro	LINEAR	V	3.0 km	MPC · JPL
25469 Ransohoff	1999 XC_{34}	Ransohoff	December 6, 1999	Socorro	LINEAR	V	3.7 km	MPC · JPL
25470	1999 XW_{35}	—	December 6, 1999	Ametlla de Mar	J. Nomen	slow	5.3 km	MPC · JPL
25471	1999 XZ_{35}	—	December 6, 1999	Oizumi	T. Kobayashi	·	3.2 km	MPC · JPL
25472 Joanoro	1999 XL_{36}	Joanoro	December 6, 1999	Ametlla de Mar	J. Nomen	EUN	4.0 km	MPC · JPL
25473	1999 XJ_{38}	—	December 3, 1999	Uenohara	N. Kawasato	·	2.4 km	MPC · JPL
25474	1999 XO_{38}	—	December 8, 1999	Socorro	LINEAR	(5)	4.6 km	MPC · JPL
25475 Lizrao	1999 XY_{40}	Lizrao	December 7, 1999	Socorro	LINEAR	·	6.2 km	MPC · JPL
25476 Sealfon	1999 XU_{42}	Sealfon	December 7, 1999	Socorro	LINEAR	·	3.1 km	MPC · JPL
25477 Preyashah	1999 XC_{44}	Preyashah	December 7, 1999	Socorro	LINEAR	·	2.1 km	MPC · JPL
25478 Shrock	1999 XR_{45}	Shrock	December 7, 1999	Socorro	LINEAR	·	2.6 km	MPC · JPL
25479 Ericshyu	1999 XD_{54}	Ericshyu	December 7, 1999	Socorro	LINEAR	·	3.6 km	MPC · JPL
25480	1999 XB_{67}	—	December 7, 1999	Socorro	LINEAR	ADE	7.6 km	MPC · JPL
25481 Willjaysun	1999 XU_{68}	Willjaysun	December 7, 1999	Socorro	LINEAR	·	2.8 km	MPC · JPL
25482 Tallapragada	1999 XM_{72}	Tallapragada	December 7, 1999	Socorro	LINEAR	·	3.3 km	MPC · JPL
25483 Trusheim	1999 XF_{74}	Trusheim	December 7, 1999	Socorro	LINEAR	·	3.7 km	MPC · JPL
25484	1999 XL_{75}	—	December 7, 1999	Socorro	LINEAR	·	2.1 km	MPC · JPL
25485	1999 XY_{75}	—	December 7, 1999	Socorro	LINEAR	·	8.8 km	MPC · JPL
25486 Michaelwham	1999 XF_{81}	Michaelwham	December 7, 1999	Socorro	LINEAR	·	2.4 km	MPC · JPL
25487	1999 XU_{82}	—	December 7, 1999	Socorro	LINEAR	GEF	4.8 km	MPC · JPL
25488 Figueiredo	1999 XD_{83}	Figueiredo	December 7, 1999	Socorro	LINEAR	(5)	3.9 km	MPC · JPL
25489	1999 XN_{83}	—	December 7, 1999	Socorro	LINEAR	EUN	5.4 km	MPC · JPL
25490 Kevinkelly	1999 XN_{84}	Kevinkelly	December 7, 1999	Socorro	LINEAR	NYS ·	6.6 km	MPC · JPL
25491 Meador	1999 XS_{84}	Meador	December 7, 1999	Socorro	LINEAR	·	5.0 km	MPC · JPL
25492 Firnberg	1999 XF_{85}	Firnberg	December 7, 1999	Socorro	LINEAR	·	5.2 km	MPC · JPL
25493	1999 XG_{85}	—	December 7, 1999	Socorro	LINEAR	·	8.1 km	MPC · JPL
25494	1999 XV_{86}	—	December 7, 1999	Socorro	LINEAR	·	6.4 km	MPC · JPL
25495 Michaelroddy	1999 XW_{86}	Michaelroddy	December 7, 1999	Socorro	LINEAR	·	4.2 km	MPC · JPL
25496	1999 XY_{86}	—	December 7, 1999	Socorro	LINEAR	EUN	5.8 km	MPC · JPL
25497 Brauerman	1999 XV_{87}	Brauerman	December 7, 1999	Socorro	LINEAR	·	3.4 km	MPC · JPL
25498	1999 XJ_{88}	—	December 7, 1999	Socorro	LINEAR	·	8.0 km	MPC · JPL
25499	1999 XR_{88}	—	December 7, 1999	Socorro	LINEAR	V	2.7 km	MPC · JPL
25500	1999 XF_{91}	—	December 7, 1999	Socorro	LINEAR	THM	8.3 km	MPC · JPL

== 25501–25600 ==
back to top

Designation			Discovery			Properties		Ref
Permanent	Provisional	Named after	Date	Site	Discoverer(s)	Category	Diam.	Ref
25501	1999 XK_{91}	—	December 7, 1999	Socorro	LINEAR	·	1.9 km	MPC · JPL
25502	1999 XO_{91}	—	December 7, 1999	Socorro	LINEAR	EOS	6.0 km	MPC · JPL
25503	1999 XW_{93}	—	December 7, 1999	Socorro	LINEAR	·	5.5 km	MPC · JPL
25504	1999 XS_{94}	—	December 7, 1999	Socorro	LINEAR	·	10 km	MPC · JPL
25505	1999 XQ_{95}	—	December 7, 1999	Oizumi	T. Kobayashi	PHO · slow	5.4 km	MPC · JPL
25506	1999 XS_{95}	—	December 9, 1999	Oizumi	T. Kobayashi	DOR	8.4 km	MPC · JPL
25507	1999 XB_{96}	—	December 9, 1999	Oizumi	T. Kobayashi	·	2.7 km	MPC · JPL
25508	1999 XC_{96}	—	December 9, 1999	Oizumi	T. Kobayashi	V	2.4 km	MPC · JPL
25509 Rodwong	1999 XF_{97}	Rodwong	December 7, 1999	Socorro	LINEAR	NYS ·	6.3 km	MPC · JPL
25510 Donvincent	1999 XJ_{97}	Donvincent	December 7, 1999	Socorro	LINEAR	V	2.3 km	MPC · JPL
25511 Annlipinsky	1999 XM_{97}	Annlipinsky	December 7, 1999	Socorro	LINEAR	·	2.7 km	MPC · JPL
25512 Anncomins	1999 XT_{97}	Anncomins	December 7, 1999	Socorro	LINEAR	slow	3.6 km	MPC · JPL
25513 Weseley	1999 XM_{98}	Weseley	December 7, 1999	Socorro	LINEAR	·	3.8 km	MPC · JPL
25514 Lisawu	1999 XJ_{99}	Lisawu	December 7, 1999	Socorro	LINEAR	slow	4.2 km	MPC · JPL
25515 Briancarey	1999 XU_{99}	Briancarey	December 7, 1999	Socorro	LINEAR	·	3.1 km	MPC · JPL
25516 Davidknight	1999 XS_{100}	Davidknight	December 7, 1999	Socorro	LINEAR	NYS	2.9 km	MPC · JPL
25517 Davidlau	1999 XD_{101}	Davidlau	December 7, 1999	Socorro	LINEAR	·	3.5 km	MPC · JPL
25518 Paulcitrin	1999 XO_{101}	Paulcitrin	December 7, 1999	Socorro	LINEAR	PAD	6.9 km	MPC · JPL
25519 Bartolomeo	1999 XS_{101}	Bartolomeo	December 7, 1999	Socorro	LINEAR	·	4.1 km	MPC · JPL
25520 Deronchang	1999 XV_{102}	Deronchang	December 7, 1999	Socorro	LINEAR	V	2.4 km	MPC · JPL
25521 Stevemorgan	1999 XH_{103}	Stevemorgan	December 7, 1999	Socorro	LINEAR	·	4.4 km	MPC · JPL
25522 Roisen	1999 XK_{103}	Roisen	December 7, 1999	Socorro	LINEAR	·	4.9 km	MPC · JPL
25523	1999 XU_{104}	—	December 10, 1999	Oizumi	T. Kobayashi	·	3.6 km	MPC · JPL
25524	1999 XA_{106}	—	December 11, 1999	Oizumi	T. Kobayashi	GEF	4.3 km	MPC · JPL
25525	1999 XM_{113}	—	December 11, 1999	Socorro	LINEAR	EUN	5.1 km	MPC · JPL
25526	1999 XV_{115}	—	December 5, 1999	Catalina	CSS	·	3.4 km	MPC · JPL
25527	1999 XM_{117}	—	December 5, 1999	Catalina	CSS	(5)	3.8 km	MPC · JPL
25528	1999 XP_{126}	—	December 7, 1999	Catalina	CSS	·	7.9 km	MPC · JPL
25529	1999 XL_{127}	—	December 11, 1999	Fountain Hills	C. W. Juels	·	7.8 km	MPC · JPL
25530	1999 XQ_{127}	—	December 6, 1999	Višnjan Observatory	K. Korlević	(1338) (FLO)	2.3 km	MPC · JPL
25531 Lessek	1999 XE_{133}	Lessek	December 12, 1999	Socorro	LINEAR	·	4.2 km	MPC · JPL
25532	1999 XJ_{133}	—	December 12, 1999	Socorro	LINEAR	EUN	6.2 km	MPC · JPL
25533	1999 XC_{140}	—	December 2, 1999	Kitt Peak	Spacewatch	·	3.1 km	MPC · JPL
25534	1999 XK_{140}	—	December 2, 1999	Kitt Peak	Spacewatch	·	7.9 km	MPC · JPL
25535	1999 XF_{144}	—	December 15, 1999	Fountain Hills	C. W. Juels	EUN · slow	7.0 km	MPC · JPL
25536	1999 XG_{144}	—	December 15, 1999	Fountain Hills	C. W. Juels	HNS	5.5 km	MPC · JPL
25537	1999 XK_{157}	—	December 8, 1999	Socorro	LINEAR	·	3.6 km	MPC · JPL
25538 Markcarlson	1999 XN_{158}	Markcarlson	December 8, 1999	Socorro	LINEAR	(5)	3.6 km	MPC · JPL
25539 Roberthelm	1999 XA_{159}	Roberthelm	December 8, 1999	Socorro	LINEAR	·	5.1 km	MPC · JPL
25540	1999 XQ_{159}	—	December 8, 1999	Socorro	LINEAR	V	3.0 km	MPC · JPL
25541 Greathouse	1999 XB_{160}	Greathouse	December 8, 1999	Socorro	LINEAR	·	4.3 km	MPC · JPL
25542 Garabedian	1999 XH_{160}	Garabedian	December 8, 1999	Socorro	LINEAR	·	2.7 km	MPC · JPL
25543 Fruen	1999 XR_{160}	Fruen	December 8, 1999	Socorro	LINEAR	EOS	5.5 km	MPC · JPL
25544 Renerogers	1999 XU_{161}	Renerogers	December 13, 1999	Socorro	LINEAR	·	2.3 km	MPC · JPL
25545	1999 XG_{164}	—	December 8, 1999	Socorro	LINEAR	EUN	4.8 km	MPC · JPL
25546	1999 XL_{164}	—	December 8, 1999	Socorro	LINEAR	·	5.1 km	MPC · JPL
25547	1999 XV_{164}	—	December 8, 1999	Socorro	LINEAR	·	3.9 km	MPC · JPL
25548	1999 XP_{165}	—	December 8, 1999	Socorro	LINEAR	MAR	4.6 km	MPC · JPL
25549 Jonsauer	1999 XZ_{167}	Jonsauer	December 10, 1999	Socorro	LINEAR	fast	5.1 km	MPC · JPL
25550	1999 XH_{168}	—	December 10, 1999	Socorro	LINEAR	·	2.7 km	MPC · JPL
25551 Drewhall	1999 XP_{168}	Drewhall	December 10, 1999	Socorro	LINEAR	·	4.6 km	MPC · JPL
25552 Gaster	1999 XS_{168}	Gaster	December 10, 1999	Socorro	LINEAR	V	2.4 km	MPC · JPL
25553 Ivanlafer	1999 XC_{169}	Ivanlafer	December 10, 1999	Socorro	LINEAR	·	3.8 km	MPC · JPL
25554 Jayaranjan	1999 XG_{169}	Jayaranjan	December 10, 1999	Socorro	LINEAR	·	3.2 km	MPC · JPL
25555 Ratnavarma	1999 XJ_{169}	Ratnavarma	December 10, 1999	Socorro	LINEAR	·	6.2 km	MPC · JPL
25556	1999 XP_{169}	—	December 10, 1999	Socorro	LINEAR	(5)	3.9 km	MPC · JPL
25557	1999 XW_{171}	—	December 10, 1999	Socorro	LINEAR	EUN	4.1 km	MPC · JPL
25558	1999 XT_{172}	—	December 10, 1999	Socorro	LINEAR	ADE	10 km	MPC · JPL
25559	1999 XW_{172}	—	December 10, 1999	Socorro	LINEAR	URS · slow	10 km	MPC · JPL
25560 Chaihaoxi	1999 XD_{173}	Chaihaoxi	December 10, 1999	Socorro	LINEAR	·	4.8 km	MPC · JPL
25561 Leehyunki	1999 XN_{173}	Leehyunki	December 10, 1999	Socorro	LINEAR	AGN	6.0 km	MPC · JPL
25562 Limdarren	1999 XJ_{174}	Limdarren	December 10, 1999	Socorro	LINEAR	(2076)	3.1 km	MPC · JPL
25563	1999 XR_{174}	—	December 10, 1999	Socorro	LINEAR	·	3.5 km	MPC · JPL
25564	1999 XC_{175}	—	December 10, 1999	Socorro	LINEAR	EOS	5.8 km	MPC · JPL
25565 Lusiyang	1999 XM_{175}	Lusiyang	December 10, 1999	Socorro	LINEAR	·	6.6 km	MPC · JPL
25566 Panying	1999 XM_{177}	Panying	December 10, 1999	Socorro	LINEAR	·	3.6 km	MPC · JPL
25567	1999 XJ_{178}	—	December 10, 1999	Socorro	LINEAR	·	6.2 km	MPC · JPL
25568	1999 XC_{179}	—	December 10, 1999	Socorro	LINEAR	MAR	4.0 km	MPC · JPL
25569	1999 XE_{192}	—	December 12, 1999	Socorro	LINEAR	·	4.3 km	MPC · JPL
25570 Kesun	1999 XT_{194}	Kesun	December 12, 1999	Socorro	LINEAR	V	2.1 km	MPC · JPL
25571	1999 XP_{195}	—	December 12, 1999	Socorro	LINEAR	·	5.1 km	MPC · JPL
25572	1999 XJ_{197}	—	December 12, 1999	Socorro	LINEAR	HNS	6.1 km	MPC · JPL
25573 Wanghaoyu	1999 XT_{205}	Wanghaoyu	December 12, 1999	Socorro	LINEAR	·	3.8 km	MPC · JPL
25574	1999 XZ_{205}	—	December 12, 1999	Socorro	LINEAR	·	5.9 km	MPC · JPL
25575	1999 XD_{206}	—	December 12, 1999	Socorro	LINEAR	·	7.5 km	MPC · JPL
25576	1999 XL_{213}	—	December 14, 1999	Socorro	LINEAR	·	2.8 km	MPC · JPL
25577 Wangmanqiang	1999 XN_{213}	Wangmanqiang	December 14, 1999	Socorro	LINEAR	·	4.0 km	MPC · JPL
25578	1999 XB_{217}	—	December 13, 1999	Kitt Peak	Spacewatch	KOR	3.5 km	MPC · JPL
25579	1999 XO_{217}	—	December 13, 1999	Kitt Peak	Spacewatch	THM	8.8 km	MPC · JPL
25580 Xuelai	1999 XU_{220}	Xuelai	December 14, 1999	Socorro	LINEAR	·	5.1 km	MPC · JPL
25581	1999 XD_{221}	—	December 14, 1999	Socorro	LINEAR	·	8.6 km	MPC · JPL
25582	1999 XG_{221}	—	December 14, 1999	Socorro	LINEAR	·	10 km	MPC · JPL
25583	1999 XJ_{221}	—	December 14, 1999	Socorro	LINEAR	EOS	12 km	MPC · JPL
25584 Zhangnelson	1999 XO_{221}	Zhangnelson	December 15, 1999	Socorro	LINEAR	·	4.0 km	MPC · JPL
25585	1999 XK_{224}	—	December 13, 1999	Kitt Peak	Spacewatch	THM	6.2 km	MPC · JPL
25586	1999 XY_{225}	—	December 13, 1999	Kitt Peak	Spacewatch	EOS	5.8 km	MPC · JPL
25587	1999 XL_{227}	—	December 15, 1999	Kitt Peak	Spacewatch	·	2.4 km	MPC · JPL
25588	1999 XW_{230}	—	December 7, 1999	Catalina	CSS	·	4.4 km	MPC · JPL
25589 Danicamckellar	1999 XY_{231}	Danicamckellar	December 9, 1999	Catalina	CSS	EUN	4.8 km	MPC · JPL
25590	1999 XM_{238}	—	December 3, 1999	Socorro	LINEAR	·	8.1 km	MPC · JPL
25591	1999 XG_{252}	—	December 9, 1999	Kitt Peak	Spacewatch	THM	6.7 km	MPC · JPL
25592	1999 YO_{1}	—	December 19, 1999	Moriyama	Ikari, Y.	·	3.2 km	MPC · JPL
25593 Camillejordan	1999 YA_{5}	Camillejordan	December 28, 1999	Prescott	P. G. Comba	NYS	5.4 km	MPC · JPL
25594 Kessler	1999 YA_{9}	Kessler	December 29, 1999	Farpoint	G. Hug, G. Bell	EOS	7.3 km	MPC · JPL
25595	1999 YD_{9}	—	December 29, 1999	Farpoint	G. Hug, G. Bell	(5)	3.0 km	MPC · JPL
25596	1999 YO_{9}	—	December 31, 1999	Oizumi	T. Kobayashi	·	2.7 km	MPC · JPL
25597 Glendahill	1999 YS_{14}	Glendahill	December 31, 1999	Anderson Mesa	LONEOS	·	2.9 km	MPC · JPL
25598	1999 YK_{16}	—	December 31, 1999	Kitt Peak	Spacewatch	EOS	7.7 km	MPC · JPL
25599	2000 AN	—	January 2, 2000	Fountain Hills	C. W. Juels	·	4.3 km	MPC · JPL
25600	2000 AS_{1}	—	January 2, 2000	Višnjan Observatory	K. Korlević	·	3.4 km	MPC · JPL

== 25601–25700 ==
back to top

Designation			Discovery			Properties		Ref
Permanent	Provisional	Named after	Date	Site	Discoverer(s)	Category	Diam.	Ref
25601 Francopacini	2000 AX_{2}	Francopacini	January 1, 2000	San Marcello	M. Tombelli, L. Tesi	THM	7.8 km	MPC · JPL
25602 Ucaronia	2000 AA_{3}	Ucaronia	January 2, 2000	Pian dei Termini	A. Boattini, Caronia, A.	·	2.3 km	MPC · JPL
25603	2000 AR_{4}	—	January 2, 2000	Višnjan Observatory	K. Korlević	·	3.8 km	MPC · JPL
25604 Karlin	2000 AM_{6}	Karlin	January 4, 2000	Prescott	P. G. Comba	KOR	4.4 km	MPC · JPL
25605	2000 AP_{7}	—	January 2, 2000	Socorro	LINEAR	·	2.0 km	MPC · JPL
25606 Chiangshenghao	2000 AT_{7}	Chiangshenghao	January 2, 2000	Socorro	LINEAR	V	2.7 km	MPC · JPL
25607 Tsengiching	2000 AN_{10}	Tsengiching	January 3, 2000	Socorro	LINEAR	V	2.0 km	MPC · JPL
25608 Hincapie	2000 AY_{10}	Hincapie	January 3, 2000	Socorro	LINEAR	·	3.5 km	MPC · JPL
25609 Bogantes	2000 AA_{12}	Bogantes	January 3, 2000	Socorro	LINEAR	(5)	3.4 km	MPC · JPL
25610	2000 AC_{20}	—	January 3, 2000	Socorro	LINEAR	·	3.0 km	MPC · JPL
25611 Mabellin	2000 AY_{20}	Mabellin	January 3, 2000	Socorro	LINEAR	KOR	3.6 km	MPC · JPL
25612 Yaoskalucia	2000 AZ_{22}	Yaoskalucia	January 3, 2000	Socorro	LINEAR	THM	6.5 km	MPC · JPL
25613 Bubenicek	2000 AL_{24}	Bubenicek	January 3, 2000	Socorro	LINEAR	·	3.2 km	MPC · JPL
25614 Jankral	2000 AE_{28}	Jankral	January 3, 2000	Socorro	LINEAR	·	7.0 km	MPC · JPL
25615 Votroubek	2000 AR_{31}	Votroubek	January 3, 2000	Socorro	LINEAR	·	3.1 km	MPC · JPL
25616 Riinuots	2000 AJ_{32}	Riinuots	January 3, 2000	Socorro	LINEAR	·	4.4 km	MPC · JPL
25617 Thomasnesch	2000 AN_{32}	Thomasnesch	January 3, 2000	Socorro	LINEAR	·	6.6 km	MPC · JPL
25618	2000 AJ_{34}	—	January 3, 2000	Socorro	LINEAR	·	8.8 km	MPC · JPL
25619 Martonspohn	2000 AQ_{34}	Martonspohn	January 3, 2000	Socorro	LINEAR	·	5.3 km	MPC · JPL
25620 Jayaprakash	2000 AL_{40}	Jayaprakash	January 3, 2000	Socorro	LINEAR	·	4.0 km	MPC · JPL
25621	2000 AF_{41}	—	January 3, 2000	Socorro	LINEAR	·	4.7 km	MPC · JPL
25622	2000 AN_{46}	—	January 3, 2000	Socorro	LINEAR	·	8.1 km	MPC · JPL
25623	2000 AY_{47}	—	January 4, 2000	Socorro	LINEAR	·	3.2 km	MPC · JPL
25624 Kronecker	2000 AK_{48}	Kronecker	January 6, 2000	Prescott	P. G. Comba	·	5.6 km	MPC · JPL
25625 Verdenet	2000 AN_{48}	Verdenet	January 5, 2000	Le Creusot	J.-C. Merlin	·	3.4 km	MPC · JPL
25626	2000 AD_{50}	—	January 5, 2000	Višnjan Observatory	K. Korlević	fast	4.7 km	MPC · JPL
25627	2000 AU_{50}	—	January 5, 2000	Fountain Hills	C. W. Juels	·	5.1 km	MPC · JPL
25628 Kummer	2000 AZ_{50}	Kummer	January 7, 2000	Prescott	P. G. Comba	·	2.5 km	MPC · JPL
25629 Mukherjee	2000 AH_{52}	Mukherjee	January 4, 2000	Socorro	LINEAR	slow	2.6 km	MPC · JPL
25630 Sarkar	2000 AT_{53}	Sarkar	January 4, 2000	Socorro	LINEAR	HOF	6.6 km	MPC · JPL
25631	2000 AJ_{55}	—	January 4, 2000	Socorro	LINEAR	·	6.8 km	MPC · JPL
25632	2000 AO_{55}	—	January 4, 2000	Socorro	LINEAR	·	4.1 km	MPC · JPL
25633	2000 AB_{56}	—	January 4, 2000	Socorro	LINEAR	THM	7.5 km	MPC · JPL
25634	2000 AZ_{59}	—	January 4, 2000	Socorro	LINEAR	·	4.7 km	MPC · JPL
25635	2000 AW_{61}	—	January 4, 2000	Socorro	LINEAR	·	7.6 km	MPC · JPL
25636 Vaishnav	2000 AS_{62}	Vaishnav	January 4, 2000	Socorro	LINEAR	KOR	3.2 km	MPC · JPL
25637	2000 AL_{63}	—	January 4, 2000	Socorro	LINEAR	·	8.4 km	MPC · JPL
25638 Ahissar	2000 AB_{64}	Ahissar	January 4, 2000	Socorro	LINEAR	·	2.8 km	MPC · JPL
25639 Fedina	2000 AV_{64}	Fedina	January 4, 2000	Socorro	LINEAR	(5)	3.0 km	MPC · JPL
25640 Klintefelt	2000 AA_{65}	Klintefelt	January 4, 2000	Socorro	LINEAR	KOR	3.6 km	MPC · JPL
25641	2000 AT_{65}	—	January 4, 2000	Socorro	LINEAR	EUN	4.0 km	MPC · JPL
25642 Adiseshan	2000 AW_{65}	Adiseshan	January 4, 2000	Socorro	LINEAR	·	3.5 km	MPC · JPL
25643	2000 AK_{68}	—	January 5, 2000	Socorro	LINEAR	MAR	4.2 km	MPC · JPL
25644	2000 AP_{70}	—	January 5, 2000	Socorro	LINEAR	·	4.2 km	MPC · JPL
25645 Alexanderyan	2000 AZ_{73}	Alexanderyan	January 5, 2000	Socorro	LINEAR	V	2.0 km	MPC · JPL
25646 Noniearora	2000 AL_{74}	Noniearora	January 5, 2000	Socorro	LINEAR	·	3.0 km	MPC · JPL
25647	2000 AQ_{75}	—	January 5, 2000	Socorro	LINEAR	·	2.6 km	MPC · JPL
25648 Baghel	2000 AJ_{77}	Baghel	January 5, 2000	Socorro	LINEAR	·	2.6 km	MPC · JPL
25649	2000 AC_{78}	—	January 5, 2000	Socorro	LINEAR	EOS	7.4 km	MPC · JPL
25650 Shaubakshi	2000 AX_{79}	Shaubakshi	January 5, 2000	Socorro	LINEAR	·	2.6 km	MPC · JPL
25651	2000 AG_{81}	—	January 5, 2000	Socorro	LINEAR	HYG	8.7 km	MPC · JPL
25652 Maddieball	2000 AQ_{83}	Maddieball	January 5, 2000	Socorro	LINEAR	THM	6.2 km	MPC · JPL
25653 Baskaran	2000 AV_{84}	Baskaran	January 5, 2000	Socorro	LINEAR	KOR	3.5 km	MPC · JPL
25654	2000 AX_{85}	—	January 5, 2000	Socorro	LINEAR	·	3.3 km	MPC · JPL
25655 Baupeter	2000 AU_{86}	Baupeter	January 5, 2000	Socorro	LINEAR	BAP	3.7 km	MPC · JPL
25656 Bejnood	2000 AF_{87}	Bejnood	January 5, 2000	Socorro	LINEAR	·	4.1 km	MPC · JPL
25657 Berkowitz	2000 AM_{87}	Berkowitz	January 5, 2000	Socorro	LINEAR	·	8.0 km	MPC · JPL
25658 Bokor	2000 AE_{88}	Bokor	January 5, 2000	Socorro	LINEAR	fast	3.3 km	MPC · JPL
25659 Liboynton	2000 AG_{88}	Liboynton	January 5, 2000	Socorro	LINEAR	NYS	3.7 km	MPC · JPL
25660	2000 AO_{88}	—	January 5, 2000	Socorro	LINEAR	·	4.8 km	MPC · JPL
25661	2000 AZ_{88}	—	January 5, 2000	Socorro	LINEAR	EOS	5.6 km	MPC · JPL
25662 Chonofsky	2000 AA_{89}	Chonofsky	January 5, 2000	Socorro	LINEAR	·	4.2 km	MPC · JPL
25663 Nickmycroft	2000 AD_{89}	Nickmycroft	January 5, 2000	Socorro	LINEAR	·	2.5 km	MPC · JPL
25664	2000 AM_{89}	—	January 5, 2000	Socorro	LINEAR	·	8.6 km	MPC · JPL
25665	2000 AO_{89}	—	January 5, 2000	Socorro	LINEAR	·	9.4 km	MPC · JPL
25666	2000 AR_{89}	—	January 5, 2000	Socorro	LINEAR	GEF	5.0 km	MPC · JPL
25667	2000 AK_{91}	—	January 5, 2000	Socorro	LINEAR	·	7.5 km	MPC · JPL
25668	2000 AY_{94}	—	January 4, 2000	Socorro	LINEAR	THM	7.5 km	MPC · JPL
25669 Kristinrose	2000 AJ_{95}	Kristinrose	January 4, 2000	Socorro	LINEAR	·	3.1 km	MPC · JPL
25670 Densley	2000 AT_{95}	Densley	January 4, 2000	Socorro	LINEAR	KOR	3.5 km	MPC · JPL
25671	2000 AW_{95}	—	January 4, 2000	Socorro	LINEAR	KOR	5.0 km	MPC · JPL
25672	2000 AX_{95}	—	January 4, 2000	Socorro	LINEAR	EOS	6.5 km	MPC · JPL
25673 Di Mascio	2000 AJ_{99}	Di Mascio	January 5, 2000	Socorro	LINEAR	·	4.2 km	MPC · JPL
25674 Kevinellis	2000 AT_{99}	Kevinellis	January 5, 2000	Socorro	LINEAR	·	2.6 km	MPC · JPL
25675	2000 AX_{101}	—	January 5, 2000	Socorro	LINEAR	MAR	5.0 km	MPC · JPL
25676 Jesseellison	2000 AG_{102}	Jesseellison	January 5, 2000	Socorro	LINEAR	V	2.0 km	MPC · JPL
25677 Aaronenten	2000 AK_{102}	Aaronenten	January 5, 2000	Socorro	LINEAR	·	2.1 km	MPC · JPL
25678 Ericfoss	2000 AU_{105}	Ericfoss	January 5, 2000	Socorro	LINEAR	·	4.6 km	MPC · JPL
25679 Andrewguo	2000 AX_{105}	Andrewguo	January 5, 2000	Socorro	LINEAR	·	2.8 km	MPC · JPL
25680 Walterhansen	2000 AP_{106}	Walterhansen	January 5, 2000	Socorro	LINEAR	V	2.1 km	MPC · JPL
25681	2000 AC_{107}	—	January 5, 2000	Socorro	LINEAR	·	10 km	MPC · JPL
25682	2000 AF_{110}	—	January 5, 2000	Socorro	LINEAR	·	3.3 km	MPC · JPL
25683 Haochenhong	2000 AA_{114}	Haochenhong	January 5, 2000	Socorro	LINEAR	·	8.4 km	MPC · JPL
25684	2000 AB_{114}	—	January 5, 2000	Socorro	LINEAR	·	4.0 km	MPC · JPL
25685 Katlinhornig	2000 AK_{116}	Katlinhornig	January 5, 2000	Socorro	LINEAR	V	2.9 km	MPC · JPL
25686 Stephoskins	2000 AF_{117}	Stephoskins	January 5, 2000	Socorro	LINEAR	·	4.3 km	MPC · JPL
25687	2000 AY_{117}	—	January 5, 2000	Socorro	LINEAR	EUN	6.0 km	MPC · JPL
25688 Hritzo	2000 AV_{120}	Hritzo	January 5, 2000	Socorro	LINEAR	·	8.9 km	MPC · JPL
25689 Duannihuang	2000 AL_{121}	Duannihuang	January 5, 2000	Socorro	LINEAR	·	3.1 km	MPC · JPL
25690 Iredale	2000 AP_{123}	Iredale	January 5, 2000	Socorro	LINEAR	·	6.3 km	MPC · JPL
25691	2000 AQ_{123}	—	January 5, 2000	Socorro	LINEAR	·	6.0 km	MPC · JPL
25692	2000 AJ_{124}	—	January 5, 2000	Socorro	LINEAR	·	10 km	MPC · JPL
25693 Ishitani	2000 AQ_{124}	Ishitani	January 5, 2000	Socorro	LINEAR	·	2.6 km	MPC · JPL
25694	2000 AX_{124}	—	January 5, 2000	Socorro	LINEAR	·	4.7 km	MPC · JPL
25695 Eileenjang	2000 AD_{125}	Eileenjang	January 5, 2000	Socorro	LINEAR	EOS · fast	4.8 km	MPC · JPL
25696 Kylejones	2000 AE_{125}	Kylejones	January 5, 2000	Socorro	LINEAR	V	2.6 km	MPC · JPL
25697 Kadiyala	2000 AA_{126}	Kadiyala	January 5, 2000	Socorro	LINEAR	·	4.5 km	MPC · JPL
25698 Snehakannan	2000 AQ_{126}	Snehakannan	January 5, 2000	Socorro	LINEAR	·	4.2 km	MPC · JPL
25699	2000 AD_{127}	—	January 5, 2000	Socorro	LINEAR	·	19 km	MPC · JPL
25700	2000 AA_{128}	—	January 5, 2000	Socorro	LINEAR	slow	16 km	MPC · JPL

== 25701–25800 ==
back to top

Designation			Discovery			Properties		Ref
Permanent	Provisional	Named after	Date	Site	Discoverer(s)	Category	Diam.	Ref
25701 Alexkeeler	2000 AE_{128}	Alexkeeler	January 5, 2000	Socorro	LINEAR	MRX	4.0 km	MPC · JPL
25702	2000 AF_{128}	—	January 5, 2000	Socorro	LINEAR	·	11 km	MPC · JPL
25703	2000 AH_{128}	—	January 5, 2000	Socorro	LINEAR	MAR	6.7 km	MPC · JPL
25704 Kendrick	2000 AO_{128}	Kendrick	January 5, 2000	Socorro	LINEAR	HOF	7.7 km	MPC · JPL
25705	2000 AU_{128}	—	January 5, 2000	Socorro	LINEAR	·	13 km	MPC · JPL
25706 Cekoscielski	2000 AU_{139}	Cekoscielski	January 5, 2000	Socorro	LINEAR	·	2.3 km	MPC · JPL
25707	2000 AQ_{141}	—	January 5, 2000	Socorro	LINEAR	ADE	7.7 km	MPC · JPL
25708 Vedantkumar	2000 AU_{141}	Vedantkumar	January 5, 2000	Socorro	LINEAR	V	2.3 km	MPC · JPL
25709	2000 AP_{142}	—	January 5, 2000	Socorro	LINEAR	EOS	7.2 km	MPC · JPL
25710 Petelandgren	2000 AL_{151}	Petelandgren	January 8, 2000	Socorro	LINEAR	·	3.4 km	MPC · JPL
25711 Lebovits	2000 AE_{152}	Lebovits	January 8, 2000	Socorro	LINEAR	NYS	2.2 km	MPC · JPL
25712	2000 AQ_{158}	—	January 3, 2000	Socorro	LINEAR	THM	8.1 km	MPC · JPL
25713	2000 AM_{159}	—	January 3, 2000	Socorro	LINEAR	·	4.4 km	MPC · JPL
25714 Aprillee	2000 AW_{160}	Aprillee	January 3, 2000	Socorro	LINEAR	·	5.3 km	MPC · JPL
25715 Lizmariemako	2000 AY_{162}	Lizmariemako	January 5, 2000	Socorro	LINEAR	·	2.7 km	MPC · JPL
25716	2000 AE_{164}	—	January 5, 2000	Socorro	LINEAR	·	4.2 km	MPC · JPL
25717 Ritikmal	2000 AW_{168}	Ritikmal	January 7, 2000	Socorro	LINEAR	·	1.9 km	MPC · JPL
25718	2000 AH_{170}	—	January 7, 2000	Socorro	LINEAR	·	2.9 km	MPC · JPL
25719	2000 AV_{171}	—	January 7, 2000	Socorro	LINEAR	·	8.1 km	MPC · JPL
25720 Mallidi	2000 AO_{172}	Mallidi	January 7, 2000	Socorro	LINEAR	V	1.8 km	MPC · JPL
25721 Anartya	2000 AA_{174}	Anartya	January 7, 2000	Socorro	LINEAR	V	1.9 km	MPC · JPL
25722 Evanmarshall	2000 AV_{174}	Evanmarshall	January 7, 2000	Socorro	LINEAR	V	3.0 km	MPC · JPL
25723 Shamascharak	2000 AX_{174}	Shamascharak	January 7, 2000	Socorro	LINEAR	GEF	4.2 km	MPC · JPL
25724	2000 AM_{179}	—	January 7, 2000	Socorro	LINEAR	EUN	4.0 km	MPC · JPL
25725 McCormick	2000 AW_{180}	McCormick	January 7, 2000	Socorro	LINEAR	·	2.9 km	MPC · JPL
25726	2000 AD_{181}	—	January 7, 2000	Socorro	LINEAR	·	9.8 km	MPC · JPL
25727 Karsonmiller	2000 AN_{182}	Karsonmiller	January 7, 2000	Socorro	LINEAR	GEF	4.5 km	MPC · JPL
25728	2000 AU_{187}	—	January 8, 2000	Socorro	LINEAR	ADE	4.9 km	MPC · JPL
25729	2000 AV_{187}	—	January 8, 2000	Socorro	LINEAR	PHO	4.4 km	MPC · JPL
25730	2000 AY_{189}	—	January 8, 2000	Socorro	LINEAR	·	7.3 km	MPC · JPL
25731	2000 AL_{193}	—	January 8, 2000	Socorro	LINEAR	·	14 km	MPC · JPL
25732	2000 AZ_{193}	—	January 8, 2000	Socorro	LINEAR	·	7.3 km	MPC · JPL
25733	2000 AG_{194}	—	January 8, 2000	Socorro	LINEAR	·	4.9 km	MPC · JPL
25734	2000 AO_{195}	—	January 8, 2000	Socorro	LINEAR	EOS	6.7 km	MPC · JPL
25735	2000 AS_{195}	—	January 8, 2000	Socorro	LINEAR	·	4.9 km	MPC · JPL
25736	2000 AP_{196}	—	January 8, 2000	Socorro	LINEAR	EOS	7.4 km	MPC · JPL
25737	2000 AK_{198}	—	January 8, 2000	Socorro	LINEAR	·	5.2 km	MPC · JPL
25738	2000 AO_{198}	—	January 8, 2000	Socorro	LINEAR	PHO	4.8 km	MPC · JPL
25739	2000 AJ_{202}	—	January 10, 2000	Socorro	LINEAR	EUN	5.7 km	MPC · JPL
25740	2000 AR_{202}	—	January 10, 2000	Socorro	LINEAR	·	5.3 km	MPC · JPL
25741	2000 AF_{222}	—	January 8, 2000	Kitt Peak	Spacewatch	·	13 km	MPC · JPL
25742 Amandablanco	2000 AV_{228}	Amandablanco	January 7, 2000	Anderson Mesa	LONEOS	·	4.4 km	MPC · JPL
25743 Serrato	2000 AA_{229}	Serrato	January 7, 2000	Anderson Mesa	LONEOS	·	10 km	MPC · JPL
25744 Surajmishra	2000 AW_{233}	Surajmishra	January 5, 2000	Socorro	LINEAR	·	2.7 km	MPC · JPL
25745 Schimmelpenninck	2000 AC_{242}	Schimmelpenninck	January 7, 2000	Anderson Mesa	LONEOS	·	7.7 km	MPC · JPL
25746 Nickscoville	2000 AF_{242}	Nickscoville	January 7, 2000	Anderson Mesa	LONEOS	TIR	6.8 km	MPC · JPL
25747 Nicerasmus	2000 AH_{242}	Nicerasmus	January 7, 2000	Anderson Mesa	LONEOS	EUN	5.1 km	MPC · JPL
25748	2000 AP_{243}	—	January 7, 2000	Socorro	LINEAR	·	15 km	MPC · JPL
25749	2000 BP_{3}	—	January 27, 2000	Oizumi	T. Kobayashi	THM	11 km	MPC · JPL
25750 Miwnay	2000 BB_{4}	Miwnay	January 28, 2000	Rock Finder	W. K. Y. Yeung	slow	7.1 km	MPC · JPL
25751 Mokshagundam	2000 BS_{6}	Mokshagundam	January 25, 2000	Socorro	LINEAR	NYS	4.7 km	MPC · JPL
25752	2000 BE_{8}	—	January 29, 2000	Socorro	LINEAR	·	2.7 km	MPC · JPL
25753	2000 BC_{14}	—	January 28, 2000	Uenohara	N. Kawasato	·	6.5 km	MPC · JPL
25754	2000 BJ_{14}	—	January 28, 2000	Oizumi	T. Kobayashi	·	7.2 km	MPC · JPL
25755	2000 BR_{14}	—	January 28, 2000	Oizumi	T. Kobayashi	EOS	9.5 km	MPC · JPL
25756	2000 BZ_{16}	—	January 30, 2000	Socorro	LINEAR	TEL	4.8 km	MPC · JPL
25757	2000 BS_{20}	—	January 26, 2000	Kitt Peak	Spacewatch	·	4.4 km	MPC · JPL
25758	2000 BZ_{29}	—	January 30, 2000	Socorro	LINEAR	THM	9.3 km	MPC · JPL
25759	2000 BH_{30}	—	January 25, 2000	Bergisch Gladbach	W. Bickel	·	3.1 km	MPC · JPL
25760 Annaspitz	2000 BF_{34}	Annaspitz	January 30, 2000	Catalina	CSS	(5)	4.7 km	MPC · JPL
25761	2000 BV_{45}	—	January 28, 2000	Kitt Peak	Spacewatch	·	3.7 km	MPC · JPL
25762	2000 CO_{2}	—	February 2, 2000	Oizumi	T. Kobayashi	EOS	7.4 km	MPC · JPL
25763 Naveenmurali	2000 CN_{4}	Naveenmurali	February 2, 2000	Socorro	LINEAR	·	3.5 km	MPC · JPL
25764 Divyanag	2000 CQ_{11}	Divyanag	February 2, 2000	Socorro	LINEAR	·	2.2 km	MPC · JPL
25765 Heatherlynne	2000 CS_{11}	Heatherlynne	February 2, 2000	Socorro	LINEAR	·	4.0 km	MPC · JPL
25766 Nosarzewski	2000 CX_{17}	Nosarzewski	February 2, 2000	Socorro	LINEAR	(12739)	3.8 km	MPC · JPL
25767 Stevennoyce	2000 CG_{20}	Stevennoyce	February 2, 2000	Socorro	LINEAR	·	4.5 km	MPC · JPL
25768 Nussbaum	2000 CD_{24}	Nussbaum	February 2, 2000	Socorro	LINEAR	KOR	4.0 km	MPC · JPL
25769 Munaoli	2000 CL_{24}	Munaoli	February 2, 2000	Socorro	LINEAR	·	2.6 km	MPC · JPL
25770	2000 CV_{24}	—	February 2, 2000	Socorro	LINEAR	·	3.5 km	MPC · JPL
25771	2000 CW_{25}	—	February 2, 2000	Socorro	LINEAR	CYB	9.0 km	MPC · JPL
25772 Ashpatra	2000 CB_{27}	Ashpatra	February 2, 2000	Socorro	LINEAR	·	4.4 km	MPC · JPL
25773	2000 CX_{27}	—	February 2, 2000	Socorro	LINEAR	HOF	11 km	MPC · JPL
25774	2000 CA_{29}	—	February 2, 2000	Socorro	LINEAR	EOS	7.2 km	MPC · JPL
25775 Danielpeng	2000 CF_{31}	Danielpeng	February 2, 2000	Socorro	LINEAR	MRX	4.2 km	MPC · JPL
25776	2000 CG_{32}	—	February 2, 2000	Socorro	LINEAR	·	7.0 km	MPC · JPL
25777	2000 CE_{34}	—	February 4, 2000	Višnjan Observatory	K. Korlević	HYG	8.2 km	MPC · JPL
25778 Csere	2000 CQ_{34}	Csere	February 4, 2000	Ondřejov	P. Kušnirák	THM	8.4 km	MPC · JPL
25779	2000 CF_{35}	—	February 2, 2000	Socorro	LINEAR	·	2.5 km	MPC · JPL
25780	2000 CS_{37}	—	February 3, 2000	Socorro	LINEAR	NYS	4.8 km	MPC · JPL
25781 Rajendra	2000 CF_{38}	Rajendra	February 3, 2000	Socorro	LINEAR	·	5.0 km	MPC · JPL
25782	2000 CX_{38}	—	February 3, 2000	Socorro	LINEAR	·	3.8 km	MPC · JPL
25783 Brandontyler	2000 CM_{39}	Brandontyler	February 4, 2000	Socorro	LINEAR	·	5.2 km	MPC · JPL
25784	2000 CU_{42}	—	February 2, 2000	Socorro	LINEAR	EOS	6.3 km	MPC · JPL
25785	2000 CY_{45}	—	February 2, 2000	Socorro	LINEAR	·	8.8 km	MPC · JPL
25786	2000 CN_{46}	—	February 2, 2000	Socorro	LINEAR	·	3.7 km	MPC · JPL
25787	2000 CF_{49}	—	February 2, 2000	Socorro	LINEAR	·	7.7 km	MPC · JPL
25788	2000 CE_{51}	—	February 2, 2000	Socorro	LINEAR	·	7.3 km	MPC · JPL
25789	2000 CK_{53}	—	February 2, 2000	Socorro	LINEAR	·	17 km	MPC · JPL
25790	2000 CW_{57}	—	February 5, 2000	Socorro	LINEAR	GEF	6.0 km	MPC · JPL
25791	2000 CM_{61}	—	February 2, 2000	Socorro	LINEAR	URS	16 km	MPC · JPL
25792	2000 CZ_{62}	—	February 2, 2000	Socorro	LINEAR	CYB	10 km	MPC · JPL
25793 Chrisanchez	2000 CS_{65}	Chrisanchez	February 4, 2000	Socorro	LINEAR	KOR	4.0 km	MPC · JPL
25794	2000 CF_{71}	—	February 7, 2000	Socorro	LINEAR	·	14 km	MPC · JPL
25795	2000 CS_{79}	—	February 8, 2000	Kitt Peak	Spacewatch	·	2.2 km	MPC · JPL
25796	2000 CT_{81}	—	February 4, 2000	Socorro	LINEAR	·	7.1 km	MPC · JPL
25797	2000 CG_{82}	—	February 4, 2000	Socorro	LINEAR	CYB	10 km	MPC · JPL
25798 Reneeschaaf	2000 CU_{82}	Reneeschaaf	February 4, 2000	Socorro	LINEAR	·	4.1 km	MPC · JPL
25799 Anmaschlegel	2000 CC_{83}	Anmaschlegel	February 4, 2000	Socorro	LINEAR	KOR	5.1 km	MPC · JPL
25800 Glukhovsky	2000 CG_{83}	Glukhovsky	February 4, 2000	Socorro	LINEAR	3:2 · SHU	16 km	MPC · JPL

== 25801–25900 ==
back to top

Designation			Discovery			Properties		Ref
Permanent	Provisional	Named after	Date	Site	Discoverer(s)	Category	Diam.	Ref
25801 Oliviaschwob	2000 CR_{84}	Oliviaschwob	February 4, 2000	Socorro	LINEAR	KOR	4.2 km	MPC · JPL
25802	2000 CA_{85}	—	February 4, 2000	Socorro	LINEAR	·	4.1 km	MPC · JPL
25803	2000 CW_{87}	—	February 4, 2000	Socorro	LINEAR	HYG	8.1 km	MPC · JPL
25804	2000 CC_{89}	—	February 4, 2000	Socorro	LINEAR	HYG	12 km	MPC · JPL
25805	2000 CV_{91}	—	February 6, 2000	Socorro	LINEAR	·	5.5 km	MPC · JPL
25806	2000 CF_{93}	—	February 6, 2000	Socorro	LINEAR	GEF	4.5 km	MPC · JPL
25807 Baharshah	2000 CU_{93}	Baharshah	February 8, 2000	Socorro	LINEAR	·	7.1 km	MPC · JPL
25808	2000 CK_{103}	—	February 7, 2000	Socorro	LINEAR	·	12 km	MPC · JPL
25809	2000 CU_{125}	—	February 3, 2000	Socorro	LINEAR	NYS	3.6 km	MPC · JPL
25810	2000 CO_{127}	—	February 2, 2000	Kitt Peak	Spacewatch	NYS	3.8 km	MPC · JPL
25811 Richardteo	2000 DE_{1}	Richardteo	February 26, 2000	Rock Finder	W. K. Y. Yeung	KOR	3.5 km	MPC · JPL
25812	2000 DE_{4}	—	February 28, 2000	Socorro	LINEAR	EOS	5.8 km	MPC · JPL
25813 Savannahshaw	2000 DW_{18}	Savannahshaw	February 29, 2000	Socorro	LINEAR	KOR	3.5 km	MPC · JPL
25814 Preesinghal	2000 DF_{24}	Preesinghal	February 29, 2000	Socorro	LINEAR	KOR	4.1 km	MPC · JPL
25815 Scottskirlo	2000 DM_{26}	Scottskirlo	February 29, 2000	Socorro	LINEAR	·	6.8 km	MPC · JPL
25816	2000 DK_{29}	—	February 29, 2000	Socorro	LINEAR	·	6.9 km	MPC · JPL
25817 Tahilramani	2000 DQ_{31}	Tahilramani	February 29, 2000	Socorro	LINEAR	THM	6.3 km	MPC · JPL
25818	2000 DH_{32}	—	February 29, 2000	Socorro	LINEAR	THM	8.5 km	MPC · JPL
25819 Tripathi	2000 DW_{32}	Tripathi	February 29, 2000	Socorro	LINEAR	THM	9.4 km	MPC · JPL
25820	2000 DB_{56}	—	February 29, 2000	Socorro	LINEAR	·	12 km	MPC · JPL
25821	2000 DY_{59}	—	February 29, 2000	Socorro	LINEAR	·	4.0 km	MPC · JPL
25822 Carolinejune	2000 DH_{72}	Carolinejune	February 29, 2000	Socorro	LINEAR	·	8.0 km	MPC · JPL
25823 Dentrujillo	2000 DV_{73}	Dentrujillo	February 29, 2000	Socorro	LINEAR	·	8.9 km	MPC · JPL
25824 Viviantsang	2000 DU_{75}	Viviantsang	February 29, 2000	Socorro	LINEAR	THM	8.0 km	MPC · JPL
25825	2000 DH_{88}	—	February 29, 2000	Socorro	LINEAR	·	6.3 km	MPC · JPL
25826	2000 DX_{93}	—	February 28, 2000	Socorro	LINEAR	HYG	9.6 km	MPC · JPL
25827	2000 DZ_{93}	—	February 28, 2000	Socorro	LINEAR	·	7.5 km	MPC · JPL
25828	2000 DM_{102}	—	February 29, 2000	Socorro	LINEAR	VER	12 km	MPC · JPL
25829	2000 DU_{108}	—	February 29, 2000	Socorro	LINEAR	HYG	11 km	MPC · JPL
25830	2000 DN_{110}	—	February 26, 2000	Uccle	T. Pauwels	EUN	3.7 km	MPC · JPL
25831	2000 DH_{111}	—	February 29, 2000	Socorro	LINEAR	THM	9.1 km	MPC · JPL
25832 Van Scoyoc	2000 EN_{9}	Van Scoyoc	March 3, 2000	Socorro	LINEAR	·	4.3 km	MPC · JPL
25833	2000 ED_{15}	—	March 5, 2000	Reedy Creek	J. Broughton	·	4.5 km	MPC · JPL
25834 Vechinski	2000 EN_{19}	Vechinski	March 5, 2000	Socorro	LINEAR	·	4.6 km	MPC · JPL
25835 Tomzega	2000 EO_{20}	Tomzega	March 3, 2000	Catalina	CSS	·	12 km	MPC · JPL
25836 Harishvemuri	2000 ER_{29}	Harishvemuri	March 5, 2000	Socorro	LINEAR	KOR	4.0 km	MPC · JPL
25837	2000 EG_{30}	—	March 5, 2000	Socorro	LINEAR	·	5.9 km	MPC · JPL
25838	2000 EV_{30}	—	March 5, 2000	Socorro	LINEAR	EOS · slow	6.0 km	MPC · JPL
25839	2000 ES_{50}	—	March 11, 2000	Tebbutt	F. B. Zoltowski	EOS	6.9 km	MPC · JPL
25840	2000 ER_{57}	—	March 8, 2000	Socorro	LINEAR	VER	10 km	MPC · JPL
25841	2000 EA_{76}	—	March 5, 2000	Socorro	LINEAR	EOS	6.7 km	MPC · JPL
25842	2000 EQ_{78}	—	March 5, 2000	Socorro	LINEAR	·	19 km	MPC · JPL
25843	2000 EQ_{84}	—	March 8, 2000	Socorro	LINEAR	·	15 km	MPC · JPL
25844	2000 EN_{85}	—	March 8, 2000	Socorro	LINEAR	EOS	8.5 km	MPC · JPL
25845	2000 EO_{86}	—	March 8, 2000	Socorro	LINEAR	ADE	9.9 km	MPC · JPL
25846	2000 EF_{93}	—	March 9, 2000	Socorro	LINEAR	·	14 km	MPC · JPL
25847	2000 EV_{97}	—	March 12, 2000	Socorro	LINEAR	SYL · CYB	10 km	MPC · JPL
25848	2000 EL_{104}	—	March 14, 2000	Reedy Creek	J. Broughton	·	6.0 km	MPC · JPL
25849	2000 ET_{107}	—	March 8, 2000	Socorro	LINEAR	MAR	5.3 km	MPC · JPL
25850	2000 EG_{108}	—	March 8, 2000	Socorro	LINEAR	TIR	7.8 km	MPC · JPL
25851 Browning	2000 EE_{120}	Browning	March 11, 2000	Anderson Mesa	LONEOS	CYB	15 km	MPC · JPL
25852	2000 EW_{147}	—	March 4, 2000	Socorro	LINEAR	·	8.9 km	MPC · JPL
25853	2000 ES_{151}	—	March 6, 2000	Haleakala	NEAT	·	7.4 km	MPC · JPL
25854	2000 EP_{166}	—	March 4, 2000	Socorro	LINEAR	·	14 km	MPC · JPL
25855	2000 EA_{168}	—	March 4, 2000	Socorro	LINEAR	EMA	12 km	MPC · JPL
25856	2000 EZ_{170}	—	March 5, 2000	Socorro	LINEAR	CYB ·	20 km	MPC · JPL
25857	2000 EM_{184}	—	March 5, 2000	Socorro	LINEAR	EOS	5.8 km	MPC · JPL
25858 Donherbert	2000 EO_{204}	Donherbert	March 10, 2000	Catalina	CSS	·	8.3 km	MPC · JPL
25859	2000 FW_{3}	—	March 28, 2000	Socorro	LINEAR	·	15 km	MPC · JPL
25860	2000 FY_{11}	—	March 28, 2000	Socorro	LINEAR	EOS	8.9 km	MPC · JPL
25861	2000 FS_{15}	—	March 28, 2000	Socorro	LINEAR	·	8.9 km	MPC · JPL
25862	2000 FC_{16}	—	March 28, 2000	Socorro	LINEAR	·	5.2 km	MPC · JPL
25863	2000 FV_{47}	—	March 29, 2000	Socorro	LINEAR	·	11 km	MPC · JPL
25864 Banič	2000 GR_{82}	Banič	April 8, 2000	Ondřejov	P. Kušnirák	·	8.9 km	MPC · JPL
25865	2000 GX_{82}	—	April 2, 2000	Socorro	LINEAR	EUN	5.0 km	MPC · JPL
25866	2000 GA_{100}	—	April 7, 2000	Socorro	LINEAR	slow	7.3 km	MPC · JPL
25867 DeMuth	2000 HK_{66}	DeMuth	April 26, 2000	Anderson Mesa	LONEOS	·	2.7 km	MPC · JPL
25868	2000 JT_{6}	—	May 4, 2000	Socorro	LINEAR	·	5.4 km	MPC · JPL
25869 Jacoby	2000 JP_{70}	Jacoby	May 1, 2000	Anderson Mesa	LONEOS	T_{j} (2.96) · 3:2	23 km	MPC · JPL
25870 Panchovigil	2000 KB_{14}	Panchovigil	May 28, 2000	Socorro	LINEAR	·	2.7 km	MPC · JPL
25871	2000 LZ_{26}	—	June 11, 2000	Valinhos	P. R. Holvorcem	EUN	6.8 km	MPC · JPL
25872	2000 MV_{1}	—	June 25, 2000	Socorro	LINEAR	·	1.2 km	MPC · JPL
25873	2000 MK_{6}	—	June 25, 2000	Socorro	LINEAR	ADE	6.4 km	MPC · JPL
25874	2000 OS_{39}	—	July 30, 2000	Socorro	LINEAR	·	4.0 km	MPC · JPL
25875 Wickramasekara	2000 OT_{52}	Wickramasekara	July 31, 2000	Socorro	LINEAR	·	3.6 km	MPC · JPL
25876	2000 PP_{16}	—	August 1, 2000	Socorro	LINEAR	MIS	5.1 km	MPC · JPL
25877 Katherinexue	2000 QN_{41}	Katherinexue	August 24, 2000	Socorro	LINEAR	·	5.7 km	MPC · JPL
25878 Sihengyou	2000 QW_{77}	Sihengyou	August 24, 2000	Socorro	LINEAR	·	1.5 km	MPC · JPL
25879	2000 QA_{105}	—	August 28, 2000	Socorro	LINEAR	EOS	8.6 km	MPC · JPL
25880	2000 QG_{196}	—	August 28, 2000	Socorro	LINEAR	·	3.3 km	MPC · JPL
25881	2000 RH_{41}	—	September 3, 2000	Socorro	LINEAR	slow	11 km	MPC · JPL
25882	2000 RY_{47}	—	September 3, 2000	Socorro	LINEAR	·	3.5 km	MPC · JPL
25883	2000 RD_{88}	—	September 2, 2000	Haleakala	NEAT	L5	30 km	MPC · JPL
25884 Asai	2000 SQ_{4}	Asai	September 20, 2000	Bisei SG Center	BATTeRS	H	1.9 km	MPC · JPL
25885 Wiesinger	2000 SD_{144}	Wiesinger	September 24, 2000	Socorro	LINEAR	(5)	3.0 km	MPC · JPL
25886	2000 SY_{181}	—	September 19, 2000	Haleakala	NEAT	·	7.1 km	MPC · JPL
25887	2000 SU_{308}	—	September 30, 2000	Socorro	LINEAR	·	9.3 km	MPC · JPL
25888	2000 UW_{109}	—	October 31, 2000	Socorro	LINEAR	·	12 km	MPC · JPL
25889	2000 VK_{29}	—	November 1, 2000	Socorro	LINEAR	EUN	5.4 km	MPC · JPL
25890 Louisburg	2000 VG_{38}	Louisburg	November 3, 2000	Olathe	Robinson, L.	·	10 km	MPC · JPL
25891	2000 WK_{9}	—	November 20, 2000	Fountain Hills	C. W. Juels	·	9.1 km	MPC · JPL
25892 Funabashi	2000 WP_{9}	Funabashi	November 22, 2000	Bisei SG Center	BATTeRS	H	1.8 km	MPC · JPL
25893 Sugihara	2000 WR_{9}	Sugihara	November 19, 2000	Desert Beaver	W. K. Y. Yeung	·	14 km	MPC · JPL
25894	2000 WV_{125}	—	November 30, 2000	Socorro	LINEAR	EOS	5.8 km	MPC · JPL
25895	2000 XN_{9}	—	December 1, 2000	Socorro	LINEAR	L4	33 km	MPC · JPL
25896	2000 XW_{14}	—	December 4, 2000	Socorro	LINEAR	·	5.7 km	MPC · JPL
25897	2000 XZ_{32}	—	December 4, 2000	Socorro	LINEAR	EUN	5.3 km	MPC · JPL
25898 Alpoge	2000 YJ_{41}	Alpoge	December 30, 2000	Socorro	LINEAR	GEF	4.2 km	MPC · JPL
25899 Namratanand	2000 YE_{61}	Namratanand	December 30, 2000	Socorro	LINEAR	NYS ·	5.6 km	MPC · JPL
25900	2000 YH_{98}	—	December 30, 2000	Socorro	LINEAR	THM	11 km	MPC · JPL

== 25901–26000 ==
back to top

Designation			Discovery			Properties		Ref
Permanent	Provisional	Named after	Date	Site	Discoverer(s)	Category	Diam.	Ref
25901 Ericbrooks	2000 YX_{99}	Ericbrooks	December 30, 2000	Socorro	LINEAR	MAS	2.0 km	MPC · JPL
25902	2000 YZ_{105}	—	December 28, 2000	Socorro	LINEAR	HNS	3.7 km	MPC · JPL
25903 Yuvalcalev	2000 YC_{116}	Yuvalcalev	December 30, 2000	Socorro	LINEAR	·	2.7 km	MPC · JPL
25904	2000 YQ_{123}	—	December 28, 2000	Socorro	LINEAR	EMA	7.6 km	MPC · JPL
25905 Clerico	2000 YO_{134}	Clerico	December 31, 2000	Anderson Mesa	LONEOS	·	6.5 km	MPC · JPL
25906 Morrell	2000 YV_{139}	Morrell	December 27, 2000	Anderson Mesa	LONEOS	EUP	11 km	MPC · JPL
25907 Capodilupo	2001 AR_{20}	Capodilupo	January 3, 2001	Socorro	LINEAR	V	2.7 km	MPC · JPL
25908	2001 BJ	—	January 17, 2001	Oizumi	T. Kobayashi	EUN	3.7 km	MPC · JPL
25909	2001 BU_{49}	—	January 21, 2001	Socorro	LINEAR	GEF	5.0 km	MPC · JPL
25910	2001 BM_{50}	—	January 25, 2001	Socorro	LINEAR	L4	25 km	MPC · JPL
25911	2001 BC_{76}	—	January 26, 2001	Socorro	LINEAR	L4	18 km	MPC · JPL
25912 Recawkwell	2001 CP_{9}	Recawkwell	February 1, 2001	Socorro	LINEAR	V	3.0 km	MPC · JPL
25913 Jamesgreen	2001 CB_{29}	Jamesgreen	February 2, 2001	Anderson Mesa	LONEOS	·	5.3 km	MPC · JPL
25914 Bair	2001 CC_{30}	Bair	February 2, 2001	Anderson Mesa	LONEOS	·	3.2 km	MPC · JPL
25915 Charlesmcguire	2001 CF_{30}	Charlesmcguire	February 2, 2001	Anderson Mesa	LONEOS	ADE	12 km	MPC · JPL
25916	2001 CP_{44}	—	February 15, 2001	Socorro	LINEAR	AMO +1km	5.7 km	MPC · JPL
25917	2001 DT_{6}	—	February 17, 2001	Višnjan Observatory	K. Korlević	·	17 km	MPC · JPL
25918	2001 DT_{13}	—	February 19, 2001	Oizumi	T. Kobayashi	slow	2.8 km	MPC · JPL
25919 Comuniello	2001 DV_{15}	Comuniello	February 16, 2001	Socorro	LINEAR	EOS	4.6 km	MPC · JPL
25920 Templeanne	2001 DT_{18}	Templeanne	February 16, 2001	Socorro	LINEAR	EOS	4.4 km	MPC · JPL
25921	2001 DS_{21}	—	February 16, 2001	Socorro	LINEAR	AEG	7.9 km	MPC · JPL
25922	2001 DY_{21}	—	February 16, 2001	Socorro	LINEAR	EOS	6.6 km	MPC · JPL
25923	2001 DS_{29}	—	February 17, 2001	Socorro	LINEAR	·	4.1 km	MPC · JPL
25924 Douglasadams	2001 DA_{42}	Douglasadams	February 19, 2001	Socorro	LINEAR	NYS	2.4 km	MPC · JPL
25925 Jamesfenska	2001 DW_{48}	Jamesfenska	February 16, 2001	Socorro	LINEAR	V	2.5 km	MPC · JPL
25926	2001 DY_{48}	—	February 16, 2001	Socorro	LINEAR	EUN	3.5 km	MPC · JPL
25927 Jagandelman	2001 DE_{51}	Jagandelman	February 16, 2001	Socorro	LINEAR	·	3.7 km	MPC · JPL
25928	2001 DJ_{52}	—	February 17, 2001	Socorro	LINEAR	·	9.4 km	MPC · JPL
25929	2001 DY_{52}	—	February 17, 2001	Socorro	LINEAR	EOS	5.3 km	MPC · JPL
25930 Spielberg	2001 DJ_{54}	Spielberg	February 21, 2001	Desert Beaver	W. K. Y. Yeung	·	2.2 km	MPC · JPL
25931 Peterhu	2001 DJ_{70}	Peterhu	February 19, 2001	Socorro	LINEAR	·	4.4 km	MPC · JPL
25932	2001 DB_{72}	—	February 19, 2001	Socorro	LINEAR	·	6.3 km	MPC · JPL
25933 Ruoyijiang	2001 DM_{73}	Ruoyijiang	February 19, 2001	Socorro	LINEAR	KOR	3.9 km	MPC · JPL
25934	2001 DC_{74}	—	February 19, 2001	Socorro	LINEAR	·	11 km	MPC · JPL
25935	2001 DG_{74}	—	February 19, 2001	Socorro	LINEAR	EUN	6.4 km	MPC · JPL
25936	2001 DZ_{79}	—	February 20, 2001	Haleakala	NEAT	·	3.3 km	MPC · JPL
25937 Malysz	2001 DY_{92}	Malysz	February 19, 2001	Anderson Mesa	LONEOS	L4	15 km	MPC · JPL
25938 Stoch	2001 DC_{102}	Stoch	February 16, 2001	Socorro	LINEAR	L4	15 km	MPC · JPL
25939	2001 EQ	—	March 3, 2001	Reedy Creek	J. Broughton	NYS	2.4 km	MPC · JPL
25940 Mikeschottland	2001 ET_{5}	Mikeschottland	March 2, 2001	Anderson Mesa	LONEOS	·	6.7 km	MPC · JPL
25941 Susanahearn	2001 EB_{9}	Susanahearn	March 2, 2001	Anderson Mesa	LONEOS	·	3.0 km	MPC · JPL
25942 Walborn	2001 EH_{9}	Walborn	March 2, 2001	Anderson Mesa	LONEOS	·	8.0 km	MPC · JPL
25943 Billahearn	2001 EL_{10}	Billahearn	March 2, 2001	Anderson Mesa	LONEOS	·	10 km	MPC · JPL
25944 Charlesross	2001 EP_{10}	Charlesross	March 2, 2001	Anderson Mesa	LONEOS	NYS	5.0 km	MPC · JPL
25945 Moreadalleore	2001 EQ_{10}	Moreadalleore	March 2, 2001	Anderson Mesa	LONEOS	·	2.3 km	MPC · JPL
25946	2001 EH_{12}	—	March 3, 2001	Socorro	LINEAR	·	3.1 km	MPC · JPL
25947	2001 EQ_{14}	—	March 15, 2001	Socorro	LINEAR	EUN	4.5 km	MPC · JPL
25948	2001 EW_{15}	—	March 15, 2001	Oizumi	T. Kobayashi	·	5.4 km	MPC · JPL
25949	2001 EH_{16}	—	March 15, 2001	Haleakala	NEAT	NYS	2.6 km	MPC · JPL
25950	2001 EU_{16}	—	March 15, 2001	Haleakala	NEAT	·	5.1 km	MPC · JPL
25951 Pamross	2001 EZ_{21}	Pamross	March 15, 2001	Anderson Mesa	LONEOS	·	2.0 km	MPC · JPL
25952	2001 FE_{2}	—	March 17, 2001	Socorro	LINEAR	·	5.5 km	MPC · JPL
25953 Lanairlett	2001 FM_{5}	Lanairlett	March 18, 2001	Socorro	LINEAR	·	3.7 km	MPC · JPL
25954 Trantow	2001 FM_{13}	Trantow	March 19, 2001	Anderson Mesa	LONEOS	·	2.5 km	MPC · JPL
25955 Radway	2001 FX_{14}	Radway	March 19, 2001	Anderson Mesa	LONEOS	·	6.3 km	MPC · JPL
25956 Spanierbeckage	2001 FE_{16}	Spanierbeckage	March 19, 2001	Anderson Mesa	LONEOS	·	9.2 km	MPC · JPL
25957 Davidconnell	2001 FO_{16}	Davidconnell	March 19, 2001	Anderson Mesa	LONEOS	AGN	4.0 km	MPC · JPL
25958 Battams	2001 FF_{18}	Battams	March 19, 2001	Anderson Mesa	LONEOS	·	5.1 km	MPC · JPL
25959 Gingergiovale	2001 FZ_{18}	Gingergiovale	March 19, 2001	Anderson Mesa	LONEOS	·	3.2 km	MPC · JPL
25960 Timheckman	2001 FQ_{20}	Timheckman	March 19, 2001	Anderson Mesa	LONEOS	·	5.0 km	MPC · JPL
25961 Conti	2001 FL_{22}	Conti	March 21, 2001	Anderson Mesa	LONEOS	·	4.5 km	MPC · JPL
25962 Yifanli	2001 FF_{26}	Yifanli	March 18, 2001	Socorro	LINEAR	·	2.6 km	MPC · JPL
25963 Elisalin	2001 FP_{26}	Elisalin	March 18, 2001	Socorro	LINEAR	·	4.3 km	MPC · JPL
25964 Liudavid	2001 FY_{26}	Liudavid	March 18, 2001	Socorro	LINEAR	·	4.5 km	MPC · JPL
25965 Masihdas	2001 FB_{27}	Masihdas	March 18, 2001	Socorro	LINEAR	NYS	2.7 km	MPC · JPL
25966 Akhilmathew	2001 FP_{28}	Akhilmathew	March 19, 2001	Socorro	LINEAR	·	2.4 km	MPC · JPL
25967	2001 FF_{29}	—	March 19, 2001	Socorro	LINEAR	EUN	4.2 km	MPC · JPL
25968	2001 FZ_{30}	—	March 21, 2001	Haleakala	NEAT	·	2.3 km	MPC · JPL
25969	2001 FM_{33}	—	March 18, 2001	Socorro	LINEAR	·	5.4 km	MPC · JPL
25970 Nelakanti	2001 FD_{35}	Nelakanti	March 18, 2001	Socorro	LINEAR	·	4.9 km	MPC · JPL
25971	2001 FP_{35}	—	March 18, 2001	Socorro	LINEAR	THM	8.8 km	MPC · JPL
25972 Pfefferjosh	2001 FV_{35}	Pfefferjosh	March 18, 2001	Socorro	LINEAR	·	2.5 km	MPC · JPL
25973 Puranik	2001 FP_{38}	Puranik	March 18, 2001	Socorro	LINEAR	·	3.6 km	MPC · JPL
25974	2001 FF_{43}	—	March 18, 2001	Socorro	LINEAR	·	3.7 km	MPC · JPL
25975	2001 FG_{43}	—	March 18, 2001	Socorro	LINEAR	EOS	4.7 km	MPC · JPL
25976	2001 FE_{44}	—	March 18, 2001	Socorro	LINEAR	·	7.2 km	MPC · JPL
25977	2001 FG_{46}	—	March 18, 2001	Socorro	LINEAR	·	22 km	MPC · JPL
25978 Katerudolph	2001 FS_{48}	Katerudolph	March 18, 2001	Socorro	LINEAR	GEF	4.4 km	MPC · JPL
25979 Alansage	2001 FC_{49}	Alansage	March 18, 2001	Socorro	LINEAR	·	4.1 km	MPC · JPL
25980	2001 FK_{53}	—	March 18, 2001	Socorro	LINEAR	·	7.3 km	MPC · JPL
25981 Shahmirian	2001 FT_{53}	Shahmirian	March 18, 2001	Socorro	LINEAR	·	3.0 km	MPC · JPL
25982	2001 FQ_{57}	—	March 19, 2001	Socorro	LINEAR	(1101)	16 km	MPC · JPL
25983	2001 FR_{57}	—	March 19, 2001	Socorro	LINEAR	HNS	6.0 km	MPC · JPL
25984	2001 FG_{60}	—	March 19, 2001	Socorro	LINEAR	·	7.0 km	MPC · JPL
25985	2001 FZ_{63}	—	March 19, 2001	Socorro	LINEAR	·	2.2 km	MPC · JPL
25986 Sunanda	2001 FW_{65}	Sunanda	March 19, 2001	Socorro	LINEAR	·	4.0 km	MPC · JPL
25987 Katherynshi	2001 FJ_{66}	Katherynshi	March 19, 2001	Socorro	LINEAR	fast	3.0 km	MPC · JPL
25988 Janesuh	2001 FA_{67}	Janesuh	March 19, 2001	Socorro	LINEAR	·	4.9 km	MPC · JPL
25989	2001 FB_{67}	—	March 19, 2001	Socorro	LINEAR	VER	9.9 km	MPC · JPL
25990	2001 FJ_{70}	—	March 19, 2001	Socorro	LINEAR	·	3.5 km	MPC · JPL
25991	2001 FN_{78}	—	March 19, 2001	Socorro	LINEAR	·	7.7 km	MPC · JPL
25992 Benjamensun	2001 FT_{78}	Benjamensun	March 19, 2001	Socorro	LINEAR	·	5.1 km	MPC · JPL
25993 Kevinxu	2001 FJ_{80}	Kevinxu	March 21, 2001	Socorro	LINEAR	slow	4.3 km	MPC · JPL
25994 Lynnelleye	2001 FK_{80}	Lynnelleye	March 21, 2001	Socorro	LINEAR	V	2.0 km	MPC · JPL
25995	2001 FA_{83}	—	March 24, 2001	Socorro	LINEAR	·	5.2 km	MPC · JPL
25996	2001 FN_{84}	—	March 26, 2001	Kitt Peak	Spacewatch	·	3.1 km	MPC · JPL
25997	2001 FP_{90}	—	March 26, 2001	Socorro	LINEAR	·	11 km	MPC · JPL
25998	2001 FW_{91}	—	March 16, 2001	Socorro	LINEAR	EUN	4.0 km	MPC · JPL
25999	2001 FN_{94}	—	March 16, 2001	Socorro	LINEAR	EOS	5.9 km	MPC · JPL
26000	2001 FH_{98}	—	March 16, 2001	Socorro	LINEAR	·	4.5 km	MPC · JPL

back to top

== See also ==
- Meanings of minor-planet names: 25001–26000
