= (9942) 1989 TM1 =

Asteroid

(9942) 1989 TM_{1}
Discovery
- Discovered by: T. Hioki; N. Kawasato
- Discovery site: Okutama Obs.
- Discovery date: 8 October 1989

Designations
- Minor planet category: main-belt · (middle) background

Orbital characteristics
- Epoch 4 September 2017 (JD 2458000.5)
- Uncertainty parameter 0
- Observation arc: 26.64 yr (9,732 days)
- Aphelion: 3.0287 AU
- Perihelion: 2.1619 AU
- Semi-major axis: 2.5953 AU
- Eccentricity: 0.1670
- Orbital period (sidereal): 4.18 yr (1,527 days)
- Mean anomaly: 217.94°
- Mean motion: 0° 14^{m} 8.52^{s} / day
- Inclination: 9.9393°
- Longitude of ascending node: 21.747°
- Argument of perihelion: 38.492°

Physical characteristics
- Mean diameter: 4.12±0.45 km 4.73 km (calculated)
- Synodic rotation period: 3.0706±0.0004 h
- Geometric albedo: 0.20 (assumed); 0.454±0.106
- Spectral type: S (assumed)
- Absolute magnitude (H): 13.40 · 13.541; 13.6 · 13.99

(9942) 1989 TM_{1} is a background asteroid from the central region of the asteroid belt, approximately 4.5 kilometers (2.8 miles) in diameter. It was discovered on 8 October 1989, by Japanese astronomers Nobuhiro Kawasato and Tsutomu Hioki at the Okutama Observatory (877) in Japan. The asteroid has a tentative rotation period of 3.1 hours.

== Orbit and classification ==
Orbits of 1989 TM_{1} (blue) and the inner planets and Jupiter

The assumed stony S-type is a non-family asteroid from the main belt's background population. It orbits the Sun in the central main-belt at a distance of 2.2–3.0 AU once every 4 years and 2 months (1,527 days; semi-major axis of 2.6 AU). Its orbit has an eccentricity of 0.17 and an inclination of 10° with respect to the ecliptic.

Its first observation was a precovery taken at the Palomar Observatory on 30 September 1989, extending the asteroid's observation arc by just 9 days prior to its official discovery observation.

== Numbering and naming ==
This minor planet was numbered by the Minor Planet Center on 2 February 1999. As of 2018, it has not been named.

== Physical characteristics ==
=== Diameter and albedo ===
The asteroid was predicted to cross the focal plane array of the Infrared Astronomical Satellite (IRAS). However, it was missed on each of its seven planned observation and was never detected. According to the "missed predictions file" of the supplemental IRAS minor planet survey (SIMPS), the body was expected to have a diameter of 13.5 kilometers and an absolute magnitude of 13.20.

Based on an absolute magnitude of 13.99, and an assumed standard albedo for stony asteroids of 0.20, the Collaborative Asteroid Lightcurve Link calculated a much smaller diameter of 4.7 kilometers, which agrees with a diameter of 4.1 kilometers, found by NASA's Wide-field Infrared Survey Explorer with its subsequent NEOWISE mission.

=== Rotation period ===
In October 2010, a rotational lightcurve for this asteroid was obtained from photometric observations at the Palomar Transient Factory in California. It rendered a tentative rotation period of 3.0706±0.0004 hours with a brightness variation of 0.08 in magnitude (U=1).
