= Meanings of minor-planet names: 25001–26000 =

As minor planet discoveries are confirmed, they are given a permanent number by the IAU's Minor Planet Center (MPC), and the discoverers can then submit names for them, following the IAU's naming conventions. The list below concerns those minor planets in the specified number-range that have received names, and explains the meanings of those names.

Official naming citations of newly named small Solar System bodies are approved and published in a bulletin by IAU's Working Group for Small Bodies Nomenclature (WGSBN). Before May 2021, citations were published in MPC's Minor Planet Circulars for many decades. Recent citations can also be found on the JPL Small-Body Database (SBDB). Until his death in 2016, German astronomer Lutz D. Schmadel compiled these citations into the Dictionary of Minor Planet Names (DMP) and regularly updated the collection.

Based on Paul Herget's The Names of the Minor Planets, Schmadel also researched the unclear origin of numerous asteroids, most of which had been named prior to World War II. This article incorporates text from this source, which is in the public domain: SBDB New namings may only be added to this list below after official publication as the preannouncement of names is condemned. The WGSBN publishes a comprehensive guideline for the naming rules of non-cometary small Solar System bodies.

== 25001–25100 ==
Named minor planet	Provisional	This minor planet was named for...	Ref; Catalog
25001 Pacheco	1998 OW_{6}	Rafael Pacheco (born 1954), a Spanish amateur astronomer, astrometrist and co-discoverer of minor planets	JPL · 25001
25010 Guillermotimoner	1998 PL_{1}	Guillermo Timoner Obrador, Spanish track cyclist and six-time UCI Motor-paced World Champion in the middle-distance event.	IAU · 25010
25014 Christinepalau	1998 QT	Christine Palau (born 1964), a computer specialist who worked on an artificial-intelligence industrial project.	JPL · 25014
25015 Lairdclose	1998 QN_{2}	Laird M. Close (born 1967), Professor of Astronomy at the University of Arizona, is an expert in adaptive optics, particularly as applied to the study of brown dwarfs, exoplanets and asteroids. He was a co-discoverer of the satellite of (45) Eugenia, the first asteroid satellite imaged from Earth, as well as (90) Antiope, and others.	JPL · 25015
25018 Valbousquet	1998 QN_{6}	Franck Valbousquet (born 1959), a French optician and amateur astronomer.	JPL · 25018
25019 Walentosky	1998 QO_{10}	Matthew James Walentosky, American 2008 Intel International Science and Engineering Fair (ISEF) winner, for his physics and astronomy project.	JPL · 25019
25020 Tinyacheng	1998 QY_{13}	Tinya Cheng, American 2008 Intel International Science and Engineering Fair (ISEF) winner, for her physics and astronomy team project.	JPL · 25020
25021 Nischaykumar	1998 QV_{17}	Nischay Kumar, American 2008 Intel International Science and Engineering Fair (ISEF) winner, for his physics and astronomy team project.	JPL · 25021
25022 Hemalibatra	1998 QK_{18}	Hemali Chandramohan Batra, American 2008 Intel International Science and Engineering Fair (ISEF) winner, for her plant sciences project.	JPL · 25022
25023 Sundaresh	1998 QA_{19}	Sushant Sundaresh, American 2008 Intel International Science and Engineering Fair (ISEF) winner, for his plant sciences project.	JPL · 25023
25024 Calebmcgraw	1998 QL_{19}	Caleb John McGraw, American 2008 Intel International Science and Engineering Fair (ISEF) winner, for his plant sciences team project.	JPL · 25024
25025 Joshuavo	1998 QW_{20}	Joshua Tristan Vo, American 2008 Intel International Science and Engineering Fair (ISEF) winner, for his plant sciences team project.	JPL · 25025
25029 Ludwighesse	1998 QO_{28}	Ludwig Otto Hesse (1811–1874), German mathematician known for his work in analytic geometry	JPL · 25029
25032 Randallray	1998 QV_{31}	Randall Scott Ray, American 2008 Intel International Science and Engineering Fair (ISEF) winner, for his plant sciences team project.	JPL · 25032
25034 Lesliemarie	1998 QS_{32}	Leslie Marie Young, American 2008 Intel International Science and Engineering Fair (ISEF) winner, for her plant sciences team project.	JPL · 25034
25035 Scalesse	1998 QN_{33}	Carlie Alexandra Scalesse, Canadian 2008 Intel International Science and Engineering Fair (ISEF) winner, for her animal sciences project.	JPL · 25035
25036 Elizabethof	1998 QT_{36}	Elizabeth Olson Ferreira, Canadian 2008 Intel International Science and Engineering Fair (ISEF) winner, for her animal sciences project.	JPL · 25036
25038 Matebezdek	1998 QK_{37}	Mate Jozsef Bezdek, Canadian 2008 Intel International Science and Engineering Fair (ISEF) winner, for his mathematical sciences project.	JPL · 25038
25039 Chensun	1998 QF_{38}	Chen Sun, Canadian 2008 Intel International Science and Engineering Fair (ISEF) winner, for his microbiology project.	JPL · 25039
25042 Qiujun	1998 QN_{42}	Qiu Jun, Chinese 2008 Intel International Science and Engineering Fair (ISEF) winner, for his electrical and mechanical engineering project.	JPL · 25042
25043 Fangxing	1998 QQ_{42}	Fang Xing, Chinese 2008 Intel International Science and Engineering Fair (ISEF) winner, for his materials and bioengineering project.	JPL · 25043
25045 Baixuefei	1998 QU_{43}	Bai Xuefei, Chinese 2008 Intel International Science and Engineering Fair (ISEF) winner, for her plant sciences project.	JPL · 25045
25046 Suyihan	1998 QK_{44}	Su Yi-Han, Chinese (Taiwanese) 2008 Intel International Science and Engineering Fair (ISEF) winner for her chemistry project and the recipient of the Intel Foundation Young Scientist Award.	JPL · 25046
25047 Tsuitehsin	1998 QN_{44}	Tsui Te Hsin, Chinese (Taiwanese) 2008 Intel International Science and Engineering Fair (ISEF) winner, for her physics and astronomy project.	JPL · 25047
25049 Christofnorn	1998 QS_{45}	Christoffer Norn, Danish 2008 Intel International Science and Engineering Fair (ISEF) winner, for his energy and transportation project.	JPL · 25049
25050 Michmadsen	1998 QN_{50}	Michael Kaergaard Madsen, Danish 2008 Intel International Science and Engineering Fair (ISEF) winner, for his environmental sciences team project.	JPL · 25050
25051 Vass	1998 QE_{53}	Gheorghe Vass (born 1944), an astronomer at the Astronomical Institute of the Romanian Academy.	JPL · 25051
25052 Rudawska	1998 QG_{54}	Regina Rudawska (born 1979), a postdoctoral fellow at Comenius University in Bratislava.	JPL · 25052
25053 Matthewknight	1998 QB_{55}	Matthew M. Knight (born 1978), an astronomer at Lowell Observatory in Flagstaff, Arizona.	JPL · 25053
25058 Shanegould	1998 QO_{63}	Shane Gould (born 1956), Australian olympic swimmer	JPL · 25058
25062 Rasmussen	1998 QH_{71}	Jesper Lykke Rasmussen, Danish 2008 Intel International Science and Engineering Fair (ISEF) winner, for his environmental sciences team project.	JPL · 25062
25065 Lautakkin	1998 QW_{85}	Lau Tak Kin, Chinese 2008 Intel International Science and Engineering Fair (ISEF) winner, for his electrical and mechanical engineering team project.	JPL · 25065
25073 Lautakshing	1998 QM_{94}	Lau Tak Shing, Chinese 2008 Intel International Science and Engineering Fair (ISEF) winner, for his electrical and mechanical engineering team project.	JPL · 25073
25074 Honami	1998 QF_{96}	Sakaguchi Honami, Japanese 2008 Intel International Science and Engineering Fair (ISEF) winner, for her animal sciences project.	JPL · 25074
25075 Kiyomoto	1998 QK_{98}	Kiyomoto Daisuke, Japanese 2008 Intel International Science and Engineering Fair (ISEF) winner, for his energy and transportation team project.	JPL · 25075
25082 Williamhodge	1998 RP_{1}	William Hodge (1903–1975) studied at Edinburgh and Cambridge and in 1936 was elected to the Lowndean chair of astronomy and geometry at Cambridge. His mathematical work was in algebraic geometry, specifically the theory of harmonic integrals and their applications to analysis.	JPL · 25082
25084 Jutzi	1998 RP_{5}	Martin Jutzi (born 1979), a researcher at the University of Bern.	JPL · 25084
25085 Melena	1998 RM_{6}	Robin Melena (born 1959) is secretary-treasurer of Lowell Observatory. She manages all the observatory's business functions, including accounting, auditing and human resources	JPL · 25085
25087 Kaztaniguchi	1998 RK_{17}	Taniguchi Kazushige, Japanese 2008 Intel International Science and Engineering Fair (ISEF) winner, for his energy and transportation team project.	JPL · 25087
25088 Yoshimura	1998 RR_{19}	Yoshimura Fumiya, Japanese 2008 Intel International Science and Engineering Fair (ISEF) winner, for his energy and transportation team project.	JPL · 25088
25089 Sanabria-Rivera	1998 RN_{25}	Betsaira Sanabria-Rivera, American (Puerto Rican) 2008 Intel International Science and Engineering Fair (ISEF) winner, for her biochemistry team project.	JPL · 25089
25091 Sanchez-Claudio	1998 RH_{41}	Alex Antonio Sanchez-Claudio, American (Puerto Rican) 2008 Intel International Science and Engineering Fair (ISEF) winner, for his biochemistry team project.	JPL · 25091
25093 Andmikhaylov	1998 RO_{45}	Andrey A. Mikhaylov, Russian 2008 Intel International Science and Engineering Fair (ISEF) winner, for his chemistry team project.	JPL · 25093
25094 Zemtsov	1998 RF_{46}	Artem A. Zemtsov, Russian 2008 Intel International Science and Engineering Fair (ISEF) winner, for his chemistry team project.	JPL · 25094
25095 Churinov	1998 RT_{46}	Andrey Anatolievich Churinov, Russian 2008 Intel International Science and Engineering Fair (ISEF) winner, for his computer science team project.	JPL · 25095
25098 Gridnev	1998 RQ_{47}	Maxim Gennadievich Gridnev, Russian 2008 Intel International Science and Engineering Fair (ISEF) winner, for his computer science team project.	JPL · 25098
25099 Mashinskiy	1998 RS_{47}	Leonid Andreevich Mashinskiy, Russian 2008 Intel International Science and Engineering Fair (ISEF) winner, for his computer science team project.	JPL · 25099
25100 Zhaiweichao	1998 RY_{47}	Zhai Weichao, Singaporean 2008 Intel International Science and Engineering Fair (ISEF) winner, for her materials and bioengineering team project.	JPL · 25100

== 25101–25200 ==
back to top

Named minor planet	Provisional	This minor planet was named for...	Ref; Catalog
25102 Zhaoye	1998 RW_{50}	Zhao Ye, Singaporean 2008 Intel International Science and Engineering Fair (ISEF) winner, for her materials and bioengineering team project.	JPL · 25102
25103 Kimdongyoung	1998 RC_{51}	Kim Dongyoung, South-Korean 2008 Intel International Science and Engineering Fair (ISEF) winner for his computer science project and recipient of a Seaborg Stockholm International Youth Science Seminar (SIYSS) award	JPL · 25103
25104 Chohyunghoon	1998 RY_{51}	Cho Hyunghoon, South-Korean 2008 Intel International Science and Engineering Fair (ISEF) winner, for his microbiology team project.	JPL · 25104
25105 Kimnayeon	1998 RJ_{52}	Kim Na Yeon, South-Korean 2008 Intel International Science and Engineering Fair (ISEF) winner, for her microbiology team project.	JPL · 25105
25106 Ryoojungmin	1998 RC_{53}	Ryoo Jung Min, South-Korean 2008 Intel International Science and Engineering Fair (ISEF) winner, for her microbiology team project.	JPL · 25106
25108 Boström	1998 RV_{55}	Johan Ingemar Boström, Swedish 2008 Intel International Science and Engineering Fair (ISEF) winner, for his animal sciences team project.	JPL · 25108
25109 Hofving	1998 RR_{56}	Tobias Olof Hofving, Swedish 2008 Intel International Science and Engineering Fair (ISEF) winner, for his animal sciences team project.	JPL · 25109
25111 Klokun	1998 RG_{64}	Vitaliy Mykhaylovych Klokun, Ukrainian 2008 Intel International Science and Engineering Fair (ISEF) winner, for his chemistry team project.	JPL · 25111
25112 Mymeshkovych	1998 RL_{65}	Maryna Yuriivna Meshkovych, Ukrainian 2008 Intel International Science and Engineering Fair (ISEF) winner, for her chemistry team project.	JPL · 25112
25113 Benwasserman	1998 RS_{65}	Benjamin David Wasserman, American 2008 Intel International Science and Engineering Fair (ISEF) winner, for his behavioral and social sciences project.	JPL · 25113
25115 Drago	1998 RP_{66}	Claire Elizabeth Drago, American 2008 Intel International Science and Engineering Fair (ISEF) winner, for her behavioral and social sciences team project.	JPL · 25115
25116 Jonathanwang	1998 RW_{68}	Jonathan Wang, American 2008 Intel International Science and Engineering Fair (ISEF) winner for his medicine and health sciences team project and recipient of the European Union Contest for Young Scientists (EUCYS) Award	JPL · 25116
25118 Kevlin	1998 RM_{71}	Kevin Huang Lin, American 2008 Intel International Science and Engineering Fair (ISEF) winner, for his microbiology project.	JPL · 25118
25119 Kakani	1998 RA_{72}	Pragya Kakani, American 2008 Intel International Science and Engineering Fair (ISEF) winner, for her physics and astronomy team project.	JPL · 25119
25120 Yvetteleung	1998 RN_{73}	Yvette Leung, American 2008 Intel International Science and Engineering Fair (ISEF) winner, for her physics and astronomy team project.	JPL · 25120
25122 Kaitlingus	1998 RJ_{77}	Kaitlyn Jeanne Lingus, American 2008 Intel International Science and Engineering Fair (ISEF) winner, for her plant sciences project.	JPL · 25122
25124 Zahramaarouf	1998 RC_{78}	Zahra Moein Maarouf, Lebanese 2007 Intel International Science and Engineering Fair (ISEF) winner for her computer science team project.	JPL · 25124
25125 Brodallan	1998 RN_{78}	Broderick David Allan (born 1995) is a finalist in the 2008 Society for Science and the Public middle school science competition, for his engineering project. He attends the Saginaw Arts and Sciences Academy, Saginaw, Michigan	JPL · 25125
25127 Laurentbrunetto	1998 SZ	Laurent Brunetto (born 1972), a physics professor in Antibes, France.	JPL · 25127
25129 Uranoscope	1998 SP_{1}	Uranoscope, a French amateur observatory, created in 1983 by Christian Bourdeille (see 372305 Bourdeille) in Gretz Armainvilliers, near Paris.	JPL · 25129
25131 Katiemelua	1998 SY_{3}	Katie Melua (born 1984), a Georgian-born British singer, songwriter and musician whose songs have included astronomical culture.	JPL · 25131
25133 Douglin	1998 SU_{14}	Douglas N. C. Lin (born 1949), a theoretical astrophysicist at the University of California, Santa Cruz.	JPL · 25133
25137 Seansolomon	1998 SS_{23}	Sean Solomon (born 1945), director of the Carnegie Institution of Washington's Department of Terrestrial Magnetism, is a geophysicist and planetary scientist who has studied the Earth's mid-ocean ridges and the surfaces of Venus, Mars and the Moon. He is the Principal Investigator for NASA's MESSENGER mission	JPL · 25137
25138 Jaumann	1998 SM_{24}	Ralf Jaumann (born 1954), a research scientist at the German Aerospace Center (DLR) and a member of the geology working group for the Dawn mission to Vesta.	JPL · 25138
25139 Roatsch	1998 SN_{25}	Thomas Roatsch (born 1958), a cartographer of planetary satellite and asteroid surfaces.	JPL · 25139
25140 Schmedemann	1998 SU_{25}	Nico Schmedemann (born 1978), a researcher at the Institute of Geological Sciences, Freie Universität in Berlin.	JPL · 25140
25142 Hopf	1998 SA_{28}	Heinz Hopf (1894–1971), a professor of mathematics at ETH Zurich in Switzerland	JPL · 25142
25143 Itokawa	1998 SF_{36}	Hideo Itokawa (1912–1999), Japanese rocket scientist. He is regarded as the Father of Japanese rocketry.	JPL · 25143
25146 Xiada	1998 SN_{43}	Established in 1921, Xiamendaxue (Xiamen University, XMU, known by the abbreviation Xiada) is one of the leading universities in China, and has been listed on China's "211 Project", "985 Project", and "Double First-class Initiative", which have been launched by the Chinese government to support selected universities.	IAU · 25146
25151 Stefanschröder	1998 SS_{53}	Stefan E. Schröder (born 1970), a planetary imaging specialist at the German Aerospace Center (DLR) in Berlin	JPL · 25151
25152 Toplis	1998 SX_{53}	Michael J. Toplis (born 1969), a geochemist at the University of Toulouse.	JPL · 25152
25153 Tomhockey	1998 SY_{53}	Thomas Arnold Hockey (born 1959) is a professor of astronomy at the University of Northern Iowa.	JPL · 25153
25154 Ayers	1998 SZ_{54}	Robert Martin Ayers (born 1941) is a long-time supporter of Lowell Observatory, currently serving as secretary of the executive committee and a multi-year member of the advisory board. He spent the summer at Lowell as an undergraduate in 1961. He retired as principal scientist from Adobe in 2005	JPL · 25154
25155 van Belle	1998 SA_{55}	Gerard van Belle (born 1968), an American astronomer at the Lowell Observatory	JPL · 25155
25156 Shkolnik	1998 SL_{55}	Evgenya Shkolnik (born 1976), a Canadian astronomer at the Lowell Observatory	JPL · 25156
25157 Fabian	1998 SA_{56}	Andrew Fabian (born 1948), a British astronomer and astrophysicist at the University of Cambridge. He has worked with a number of orbiting X-ray observatories to advance our knowledge of such X-ray sources as black holes, their accretion disks, and gas in active galactic nuclei and clusters of galaxies.	JPL · 25157
25158 Berman	1998 SF_{57}	Alan Berman (born 1925) is a physicist who played a seminal role in developing modern electronic communications systems. In 15 years as Director of Research at the US Naval Research Laboratory, he oversaw development of the Global Positioning System (GPS) and advanced satellite communications.	JPL · 25158
25159 Michaelwest	1998 SN_{57}	Michael West (born 1959) is the deputy director for Science at Lowell Observatory. His research focuses on star clusters and galaxies. He was PI for six Hubble Space Telescope projects and has authored two books, including A Sky Wonderful with Stars.	JPL · 25159
25160 Joellama	1998 SN_{58}	Joseph "Joe" Llama (born 1988) is a tenure track astronomer at Lowell Observatory. He started at Lowell as a postdoc working with Evgenia Shkolnik. His research is broadly focused on stars and extrasolar planets. Joe is also an amateur photographer.	JPL · 25160
25161 Strosahl	1998 SR_{58}	Susan Strosahl (born 1960) has been an employee of Lowell Observatory since 2003. She has a degree in computer engineering. She started working in the public program and is currently working as an observer at Lowell's Navy Precision Optical Interferometer.	JPL · 25161
25162 Beckage	1998 ST_{59}	Michael (Mike) Beckage (born 1959) is a long-time supporter of Lowell Observatory, currently serving as Chair of Lowell Observatory's executive committee and the Lowell Observatory Foundation. He shares his love of astronomy through outreach programs to the community and amateur astronomy clubs	JPL · 25162
25163 Williammcdonald	1998 SC_{60}	William "Bill" McDonald (born 1935) is an avid amateur astronomer. He has volunteered in Lowell Observatory's evening outreach programs since 2012, spearheading the reintroduction of the public program's video observing system (Mallincam) and assisting staff with its upgrade and maintenance.	JPL · 25163
25164 Sonomastate	1998 SJ_{62}	Sonoma State University, located in Rohnert Park, California, has been educating students in the liberal arts and sciences since 1961. It has a nationally recognized Education and Public Outreach program for space missions and STEM teacher education, and its physics students have built a successful CubeSat.	JPL · 25164
25165 Leget	1998 SK_{62}	Robert Leget (born 1935) is an American educator who taught high school earth science, chemistry and math for 30 years, mostly at Buckeye High in Medina, Ohio. Named Outstanding Secondary Earth Science Teacher for Ohio by the National Assoc. of Geology Teachers, he inspired generations of students.	JPL · 25165
25166 Thompson	1998 SM_{62}	Samantha Thompson (born 1985) is the curator of exhibits at Lowell Observatory in Flagstaff, AZ. She has degrees in history and in physics & astronomy. In 2016 she designed Lowell's Spaceguard Academy exhibit that highlighted the science and exploration of asteroids	JPL · 25166
25175 Lukeandraka	1998 SX_{75}	Luke Steven Andraka (born 1995) is a finalist in the 2008 Society for Science and the Public middle school science competition, for his environmental sciences project. He attends the Chesapeake Science Point Public Charter School, Hanover, Maryland	JPL · 25175
25176 Thomasaunins	1998 ST_{81}	Thomas Rudolf Aunins (born 1994) is a finalist in the 2008 Society for Science and the Public middle school science competition, for his physical sciences project. He attends the Lenape Middle School, Doylestown, Pennsylvania	JPL · 25176
25178 Shreebose	1998 SA_{96}	Shree Bose (born 1994) is a finalist in the 2008 Society for Science and the Public middle school science competition, for her environmental sciences project. She attends the Trinity Valley School, Fort Worth, Texas	JPL · 25178
25180 Kenyonconlin	1998 SM_{107}	Kenyon Rex Conlin (born 1996) is a finalist in the 2008 Society for Science and the Public middle school science competition, for his physical sciences project. He attends the Rocky Mountain Middle School, Heber City, Utah	JPL · 25180
25182 Siddhawan	1998 ST_{110}	Sidharth Dhawan (born 1994) is a finalist in the 2008 Society for Science and the Public middle school science competition, for his engineering project. He attends the Meadow Park Middle School, Beaverton, Oregon	JPL · 25182
25183 Grantfisher	1998 SJ_{115}	Grant Garrett Fisher (born 1994) is a finalist in the 2008 Society for Science and the Public middle school science competition, for his animal and plant sciences project. He attends the Pi Beta Phi Elementary School, Gatlinburg, Tennessee	JPL · 25183
25184 Taylorgaines	1998 SL_{115}	Taylor Diahann Gaines (born 1995) is a finalist in the 2008 Society for Science and the Public middle school science competition, for her animal and plant sciences project. She attends the Iva E. Wells Middle School, Seneca, Missouri	JPL · 25184
25189 Glockner	1998 SD_{118}	Katherine Whittemore Glockner (born 1994) is a finalist in the 2008 Society for Science and the Public middle school science competition, for her biochemistry, medicine, health science and microbiology project. She attends the Rhoades School, Encinitas, California	JPL · 25189
25190 Thomasgoodin	1998 SM_{118}	Thomas J. T. Goodin (born 1994) is a finalist in the 2008 Society for Science and the Public middle school science competition, for his engineering project. He attends the Mid-Pacific Institute, Honolulu, Hawaii	JPL · 25190
25191 Rachelouise	1998 SE_{123}	Rachel Louise Graham (born 1995) is a finalist in the 2008 Society for Science and the Public middle school science competition, for her engineering project. She attends the Riverton Middle School, Riverton, Wyoming	JPL · 25191
25193 Taliagreene	1998 SV_{126}	Talia Kate Greene (born 1994) is a finalist in the 2008 Society for Science and the Public middle school science competition, for her mathematics and computer science project. She attends the Cocoa Beach Junior Senior High School, Cocoa Beach, Florida	JPL · 25193
25198 Kylienicole	1998 SC_{138}	Kylie Nicole Grissom (born 1993) is a finalist in the 2008 Society for Science and the Public middle school science competition, for her earth and space sciences project. She attends the North Ogden Junior High School, North Ogden, Utah	JPL · 25198
25199 Jiahegu	1998 SB_{139}	Jiahe Gu (born 1994) is a finalist in the 2008 Society for Science and the Public middle school science competition, for his animal and plant sciences project. He attends the Martin Luther King Jr., Magnet High School, Nashville, Tennessee	JPL · 25199

== 25201–25300 ==
back to top

Named minor planet	Provisional	This minor planet was named for...	Ref; Catalog
25212 Ayushgupta	1998 SU_{149}	Ayush Gupta (born 1993) is a finalist in the 2008 Society for Science and the Public middle school science competition, for his physical sciences project. He attends the Oregon Episcopal School, Portland, Oregon	JPL · 25212
25216 Enricobernardi	1998 TU_{1}	Enrico Bernardi (1841–1919), an Italian engineer and professor of mechanics.	JPL · 25216
25225 Patrickbenson	1998 TN_{30}	Patrick "Pat" Benson (born 1951) has volunteered in Lowell Observatory's evening outreach programs since 2012 as a portable telescope operator. He also participates in community astronomy outreach activities. His decades of experience in amateur astronomy make him a highly valued member of the volunteer team.	JPL · 25225
25226 Brasch	1998 TP_{30}	Klaus Brasch (born 1940) began volunteering at Lowell Observatory in 2008 as a portable telescope operator in our evening outreach programs. He is also an astrophotographer and writer; many of his images as well as Lowell-related articles have been published in Sky & Telescope and Astronomy magazines, among others.	JPL · 25226
25227 Genehill	1998 TQ_{30}	Gene Hill (born 1933) began volunteering at Lowell Observatory in 2009, and has since shared his passion for teaching and astronomy, giving daytime tours of the Observatory's historic campus and operating our solar telescopes. He always brings in the latest astronomy news to include on his tours.	JPL · 25227
25228 Mikekitt	1998 TR_{30}	Michael Kitt (born 1941) is an amateur astronomer who has written numerous articles about lunar observing and is author of The Moon: an Observing Guide for Backyard Telescopes. He is a long-standing Lowell Observatory Advisory Board member and a supporter of preservation activities there.	JPL · 25228
25229 Karenkitt	1998 TV_{30}	Karen Kitt (born 1949) has been a volunteer in the Lowell Observatory Archives since 2013. She has organized and cataloged the Pluto Collection, the Comet Halley Collection, and the correspondence of former Lowell astronomer C.O. Lampland. She is currently digitizing Lampland's letters for the observatory's digital archives.	JPL · 25229
25230 Borgis	1998 TT_{31}	Steven Borgis (born 1953) is an American educator and coach, who taught language arts for three decades at Buckeye Junior High School in Medina, Ohio. He coached both girls and boys basketball, as well as football, cross country, golf, volleyball, and softball, and inspired students with both his words and his actions.	JPL · 25230
25231 Naylor	1998 TW_{32}	Kris Naylor (born 1966) has been utilizing her amateur astronomy skills since 2005 as a Lowell Observatory volunteer, operating portable telescopes during our evening outreach programs. Kris has helped to mentor new volunteers, and been involved in astronomy outreach activities throughout the Flagstaff community.	JPL · 25231
25232 Schatz	1998 TN_{33}	Dennis Schatz (born 1947) is an American astronomer and educator who was vice-president of the Pacific Science Center, President & workshop leader for the Astronomical Society of the Pacific, author of 23 children's books on science, and co-developer of educational programs like Project ASTRO & Portal to the Public.	JPL · 25232
25233 Tallman	1998 TD_{34}	Gary Tallman (born 1943) has volunteered in Lowell Observatory's daytime outreach programs since 2012, leading tours of the historic campus and hosting Putnam Collection Center open houses. He also operates the solar telescopes, explaining visible features of the Sun to visitors.	JPL · 25233
25234 Odell	1998 TW_{34}	Andy Odell (born 1949) is a professional astronomer. He's been involved with Lowell's evening outreach programs since 2002, operating portable telescopes and sharing his knowledge of the night sky with visitors. He is Lowell's longest-tenured volunteer.	JPL · 25234
25237 Hurwitz	1998 UG_{7}	Adolf Hurwitz (1859–1919), German mathematician	JPL · 25237
25240 Qiansanqiang	1998 UO_{8}	Sanqiang Qiang (1913–1992), a Chinese nuclear scientist and member of the Chinese Academy of Sciences, and one of the founders of China's atomic energy program	JPL · 25240
25250 Jonnapeterson	1998 UX_{23}	Jonna Peterson (born 1945) has been familiar with the night sky since childhood, and a dedicated volunteer in Lowell Observatory's evening outreach programs since 2012. She enjoys using binoculars to teach visitors about the night sky.	JPL · 25250
25256 Imbrie-Moore	1998 UG_{34}	Annabel Imbrie-Moore (born 1994) is a finalist in the 2008 Society for Science and the Public middle school science competition, for her mathematics & computer science project. She attends the Peabody School, Charlottesville, Virginia	JPL · 25256
25257 Elizmakarron	1998 UF_{42}	Elizabeth Marie Karron (born 1996) is a finalist in the 2008 Society for Science and the Public middle school science competition, for her animal and plant sciences project. She attends the Whitefish Bay Middle School, Whitefish Bay, Wisconsin	JPL · 25257
25258 Nathaniel	1998 VU	Nathaniel Brian Marsden (born 1997), second grandson of Minor Planet Center director Brian G. Marsden (the asteroid was discovered on his first birthday)	MPC · 25258
25259 Lucarnold	1998 VK_{4}	Luc Arnold (born 1965) is an astronomer working at the Observatoire de Haute Provence. His research fields are exobiology and optics, but he observes comets with his homemade telescope	JPL · 25259
25264 Erickeen	1998 VP_{16}	Eric C. Keen (born 1994) is a finalist in the 2008 Society for Science and the Public middle school science competition, for his environmental sciences project. He is homeschooled in Bethesda, Maryland	JPL · 25264
25266 Taylorkinyon	1998 VS_{20}	Taylor Frances Kinyon (born 1994) is a finalist in the 2008 Society for Science and the Public middle school science competition, for her engineering project. She attends the Plankinton School District, Plankinton, South Dakota	JPL · 25266
25273 Barrycarole	1998 VN_{32}	Barry Paul Keith Griffin (born 1943) and Carole Anne Griffin (born 1944), the parents of British astronomer Ian P. Griffin who discovered this minor planet	JPL · 25273
25275 Jocelynbell	1998 VF_{33}	Jocelyn Bell Burnell (born 1943), British astrophysicist from Northern Ireland, who co-discovered the first radio pulsar in 1967	JPL · 25275
25276 Dimai	1998 VJ_{33}	Alessandro Dimai (born 1962), Italian amateur astronomer and discoverer of supernovae. He is an active observer at the Cortina Observatory (154) and a friend of the discoverer.	JPL · 25276
25290 Vibhuti	1998 WH_{14}	Vibhuti Krishna (born 1994) is a finalist in the 2008 Society for Science and the Public middle school science competition, for her biochemistry, medicine, health science and microbiology project. She attends the Solon Middle School, Solon, Ohio	JPL · 25290
25294 Johnlaberee	1998 WA_{17}	John Alfred Laberee (born 1994) is a finalist in the 2008 Society for Science and the Public middle school science competition, for his environmental sciences project. He is homeschooled in Medford, New Jersey	JPL · 25294
25296 Minamisatsuma	1998 WD_{20}	Minamisatsuma City in Kagoshima Prefecture, Japan.	IAU · 25296
25298 Fionapaine	1998 WB_{22}	Fiona Ann Paine (born 1995) is a finalist in the 2008 Society for Science and the Public middle school science competition, for her environmental sciences project. She attends the Barrington Middle School, Barrington, Rhode Island	JPL · 25298
25300 Andyromine	1998 VJ_{33}	Andrew Romine, 2008 SSP/MSP national science fair finalist	JPL · 25300

== 25301–25400 ==
back to top

Named minor planet	Provisional	This minor planet was named for...	Ref; Catalog
25301 Ambrofogar	1998 XZ_{2}	Ambrogio Fogar, Italian sailor (yachtsman), explorer and author ‡	MPC · 25301
25302 Niim	1998 XW_{3}	Yoshihiro Niim, Japanese space engineer	JPL · 25302
25309 Chrisauer	1998 XQ_{87}	Christopher Peterson Sauer (born 1995) is a finalist in the 2008 Society for Science and the Public middle school science competition, for his engineering project. He attends the Corte Madera School, Portola Valley, California	JPL · 25309
25312 Asiapossenti	1998 YU_{6}	Asia Possenti (born 2008) is a nephew of the discoverer	JPL · 25312
25316 Comnick	1999 AH_{23}	Richard "Rich" Comnick (born 1940) has been a volunteer in the Lowell Observatory archives since 2007. He has digitized and catalogued historic observation logbooks, photographs and manuscript material for the Archives website and the Arizona Memory Project.	JPL · 25316
25321 Rohitsingh	1999 FR_{27}	Rohit Kumar Singh (born 1994) is a finalist in the 2008 Society for Science and the Public middle school science competition, for his engineering project. He attends the Lincoln Middle School, Gainesville, Florida	JPL · 25321
25322 Rebeccajean	1999 FM_{28}	Rebecca Jean Smouse (born 1995) is a finalist in the 2008 Society for Science and the Public middle school science competition, for her animal and plant sciences project. She attends the Kyrene Middle School, Tempe, Arizona	JPL · 25322
25326 Lawrencesun	1999 JB_{32}	Lawrence Sun (born 1996) is a finalist in the 2008 Society for Science and the Public middle school science competition, for his mathematics and computer science project. He attends the Highland Park Middle School, Beaverton, Oregon	JPL · 25326
25331 Berrevoets	1999 KY_{4}	Cor Berrevoets, Dutch developer of Registax, astronomical image-processing freeware	JPL · 25331
25333 Britwenger	1999 KW_{13}	Brittany Michelle Wenger (born 1994) is a finalist in the 2008 Society for Science and the Public middle school science competition, for her mathematics and computer science project. She attends the R. Dan Nolan Middle School, Bradenton, Florida	JPL · 25333
25337 Elisabetta	1999 PK	Elisabetta Masi (b. 2019) is the daughter of the discoverer.	IAU · 25337
25340 Segoves	1999 RX_{31}	Segovesus, Central European Celtic prince † ‡	MPC · 25340
25348 Wisniowiecki	1999 RJ_{124}	Anna Marie Wisniowiecki (born 1993) is a finalist in the 2008 Society for Science and the Public middle school science competition, for her earth and space sciences project. She attends the McCullough Junior High School, The Woodlands, Texas	JPL · 25348
25354 Zdasiuk	1999 RD_{211}	Jonathan Andrew Zdasiuk (born 1995) is a finalist in the 2008 Society for Science and the Public middle school science competition, for his engineering project. He attends the Corte Madera School, Portola Valley, California	JPL · 25354
25358 Boskovice	1999 TY_{3}	Boskovice a town in Middle Moravia, was settled in prehistoric times. A gothic castle from the 13th century and a Jewish quarter are among its many tourist attractions	JPL · 25358
25364 Allisonbaas	1999 TD_{26}	Allison Baas mentored a finalist in the 2008 Society for Science and the Public middle school science competition. She teaches at the Plankinton School District, Plankinton, South Dakota	JPL · 25364
25365 Bernreuter	1999 TC_{27}	John Bernreuter mentored a finalist in the 2008 Society for Science and the Public middle school science competition. She teaches at the R. Dan Nolan Middle School, Bradenton, Florida	JPL · 25365
25366 Maureenbobo	1999 TH_{30}	Maureen Bobo mentored a finalist in the 2008 Society for Science and the Public middle school science competition. She teaches at the Rocky Mountain Middle School, Heber City, Utah	JPL · 25366
25367 Cicek	1999 TC_{96}	Kazim Cicek mentored a finalist in the 2008 Society for Science and the Public middle school science competition. He teaches at the Chesapeake Science Point Public Charter School, Hanover, Maryland	JPL · 25367
25368 Gailcolwell	1999 TQ_{96}	Gail Colwell mentored a finalist in the 2008 Society for Science and the Public middle school science competition. She teaches at the McCullough Junior High School, The Woodlands, Texas	JPL · 25368
25369 Dawndonovan	1999 TR_{108}	Dawn Donovan mentored a finalist in the 2008 Society for Science and the Public middle school science competition. She teaches at the Martin Luther King Jr., Magnet High School, Nashville, Tennessee	JPL · 25369
25370 Karenfletch	1999 TW_{144}	Karen Fletcher mentored a finalist in the 2008 Society for Science and the Public middle school science competition. She teaches at the Barrington Middle School, Barrington, Rhode Island	JPL · 25370
25371 Frangaley	1999 TS_{153}	Fran Galey mentored a finalist in the 2008 Society for Science and the Public middle school science competition. She teaches at the Riverton Middle School, Riverton, Wyoming	JPL · 25371
25372 Shanagarza	1999 TB_{164}	Shana Garza mentored a finalist in the 2008 Society for Science and the Public middle school science competition. She teaches at the Pi Beta Phi Elementary School, Gatlinburg, Tennessee	JPL · 25372
25373 Gorsch	1999 TC_{166}	Lisa Gorsch mentored a finalist in the 2008 Society for Science and the Public middle school science competition. She teaches at the Peabody School, Charlottesville, Virginia	JPL · 25373
25374 Harbrucker	1999 TC_{178}	Roberta Harbrucker mentored a finalist in the 2008 Society for Science and the Public middle school science competition. She teaches at the Lincoln Middle School, Gainesville, Florida	JPL · 25374
25375 Treenajoi	1999 TR_{180}	Treena Joi mentored a finalist in the 2008 Society for Science and the Public middle school science competition. She teaches at the Corte Madera School, Portola Valley, California	JPL · 25375
25376 Christikeen	1999 TS_{180}	Christine Keen mentored a finalist in the 2008 Society for Science and the Public middle school science competition. She teaches at a homeschool, Bethesda, Maryland	JPL · 25376
25377 Rolaberee	1999 TZ_{196}	Rosemary Laberee mentored a finalist in the 2008 Society for Science and the Public middle school science competition. She teaches at a homeschool, Medford, New Jersey	JPL · 25377
25378 Erinlambert	1999 TY_{197}	Erin Lambert mentored a finalist in the 2008 Society for Science and the Public middle school science competition. She teaches at the Kyrene Middle School, Tempe, Arizona	JPL · 25378
25381 Jerrynelson	1999 TE_{213}	Jerry Nelson mentored a finalist in the 2008 Society for Science and the Public middle school science competition. He teaches at the North Ogden Junior High School, North Ogden, Utah	JPL · 25381
25383 Lindacker	1999 UN_{1}	Jan Tadeáš Lindacker (1768–1816) was a Czech geologist and botanist. He worked in Osek, near Rokycany, in iron ore mines, where he assembled a unique collection of Carboniferous fossil plants and minerals and joined it with that of Kaspar Maria von Sternberg. The collection was donated to the National Museum in Prague.	JPL · 25383
25384 Partizánske	1999 UW_{1}	Partizánske, western Slovakia (originally Symoni), home to a public observatory	JPL · 25384
25399 Vonnegut	1999 VN_{20}	Kurt Vonnegut (born 1922), a revolutionary U.S. science-fiction writer who crossed over into mainstream literature and is often referred to as the "Mark Twain of the second half of the twentieth century".	JPL · 25399

== 25401–25500 ==
back to top

Named minor planet	Provisional	This minor planet was named for...	Ref; Catalog
25402 Angelanorse	1999 VA_{27}	Angela Norse mentored a finalist in the 2008 Society for Science and the Public middle school science competition. She teaches at the Highland Park Middle School, Beaverton, Oregon	JPL · 25402
25403 Carlapiazza	1999 VE_{31}	Carla Piazza mentored a finalist in the 2008 Society for Science and the Public middle school science competition. She teaches at the Saginaw Arts and Sciences Academy, Saginaw, Michigan	JPL · 25403
25404 Shansample	1999 VU_{31}	Shannon Sample mentored a finalist in the 2008 Society for Science and the Public middle school science competition. She teaches at the Iva E. Wells Middle School, Seneca, Missouri	JPL · 25404
25405 Jeffwidder	1999 VM_{32}	Jeff Widder mentored a finalist in the 2008 Society for Science and the Public middle school science competition. He teaches at the Whitefish Bay Middle School, Whitefish Bay, Wisconsin	JPL · 25405
25406 Debwysocki	1999 VR_{32}	Deborah Wysocki mentored a finalist in the 2008 Society for Science and the Public middle school science competition. She teaches at the Lenape Middle School, Doylestown, Pennsylvania	JPL · 25406
25410 Abejar	1999 VG_{36}	Patrick Jeffrey Abejar (born 1991) is a finalist in the 2009 Intel Science Talent Search (STS), a science competition for high school seniors, for his earth and planetary science project. He attends the Smithtown High School West, Smithtown, New York	JPL · 25410
25412 Arbesfeld	1999 VZ_{38}	Noah Maxwell Arbesfeld (born 1991) is a finalist in the 2009 Intel Science Talent Search (STS), a science competition for high school seniors, for his mathematics project. He attends the Lexington High School, Lexington, Massachusetts	JPL · 25412
25413 Dorischen	1999 VE_{39}	Doris Chen (born 1991) is a finalist in the 2009 Intel Science Talent Search (STS), a science competition for high school seniors, for her medicine and health project. She attends the Tenafly High School, Tenafly, New Jersey	JPL · 25413
25414 Cherkassky	1999 VH_{48}	Michael Sheng Cherkassky (born 1991) is a finalist in the 2009 Intel Science Talent Search (STS), a science competition for high school seniors, for his computer science project. He attends the Edina High School, Edina, Minnesota	JPL · 25414
25415 Jocelyn	1999 VL_{53}	Jocelyn Chuang (born 1991) is a finalist in the 2009 Intel Science Talent Search (STS), a science competition for high school seniors, for her behavioral and social sciences project. She attends the Bronx High School of Science, Bronx, New York	JPL · 25415
25416 Chyanwen	1999 VY_{58}	Wen Chyan (born 1991) is a finalist in the 2009 Intel Science Talent Search (STS), a science competition for high school seniors, for his chemistry project. He attends the Texas Academy of Mathematics & Science, Denton, Texas	JPL · 25416
25417 Coquillette	1999 VZ_{65}	Elizabeth Charlotte Coquillette (born 1991) is a finalist in the 2009 Intel Science Talent Search (STS), a science competition for high school seniors, for her engineering project. She attends the Hathaway Brown School, Shaker Heights, Ohio	JPL · 25417
25418 Deshmukh	1999 VG_{66}	Aniruddha Sandeep Deshmukh (born 1991) is a finalist in the 2009 Intel Science Talent Search (STS), a science competition for high school seniors, for his botany project. He attends the Bellarmine College Preparatory School, San Jose, California	JPL · 25418
25421 Gafaran	1999 VL_{86}	Gabriela Aylin Faran (born 1990) is a finalist in the 2009 Intel Science Talent Search (STS), a science competition for high school seniors, for her earth and planetary science project. She attends the West High School, Madison, Wisconsin	JPL · 25421
25422 Abigreene	1999 VL_{111}	Abigail Sara Greene (born 1991) is a finalist in the 2009 Intel Science Talent Search (STS), a science competition for high school seniors, for her behavioral and social sciences project. She attends the John Jay High School, Cross River, New York	JPL · 25422
25424 Gunasekaran	1999 VQ_{158}	Suvai Gunasekaran (born 1991) is a finalist in the 2009 Intel Science Talent Search (STS), a science competition for high school seniors, for her materials science project. She attends the James Madison Memorial High School, Madison, Wisconsin	JPL · 25424
25425 Chelsealynn	1999 VR_{169}	Chelsea Lynn Jurman (born 1991) is a finalist in the 2009 Intel Science Talent Search (STS), a science competition for high school seniors, for her behavioral and social sciences project. She attends the Roslyn High School, Roslyn Heights, New York	JPL · 25425
25426 Alexanderkim	1999 VU_{169}	Alexander Mee-Woong Kim (born 1991) is a finalist in the 2009 Intel Science Talent Search (STS), a science competition for high school seniors, for his zoology project. He attends the Thomas Jefferson High School for Science nce and Technology, Alexandria, Virginia	JPL · 25426
25427 Kratchmarov	1999 VP_{170}	Radomir Kratchmarov (born 1991) is a finalist in the 2009 Intel Science Talent Search (STS), a science competition for high school seniors, for his microbiology project. He attends the Livingston High School, Livingston, New Jersey	JPL · 25427
25428 Lakhanpal	1999 VM_{172}	Nitish Lakhanpal (born 1991) is a finalist in the 2009 Intel Science Talent Search (STS), a science competition for high school seniors, for his bioinformatics and genomics project. He attends the University High School, Irvine, California	JPL · 25428
25430 Ericlarson	1999 VT_{189}	Eric Kerner Larson (born 1991) is a finalist in the 2009 Intel Science Talent Search (STS), a science competition for high school seniors, for his mathematics project. He attends the South Eugene High School, Eugene, Oregon	JPL · 25430
25432 Josepherli	1999 VG_{225}	Josepher Li (born 1991) is a finalist in the 2009 Intel Science Talent Search (STS), a science competition for high school seniors, for his biochemistry project. He attends the Bronx High School of Science, Bronx, New York	JPL · 25432
25434 Westonia	1999 WS_{2}	Elizabeth Jane Weston (1581–1612), known as "Westonia", was an English-Czech poet, known mostly for her Neo-Latin poetry. Her Parthenicon was published in 1608. She is considered the first female Czech poet.	JPL · 25434
25455 Anissamak	1999 XP_{12}	Anissa Yuenming Mak (born 1991) is a finalist in the 2009 Intel Science Talent Search (STS), a science competition for high school seniors, for her mathematics project. She attends the Stuyvesant High School, New York, New York	JPL · 25455
25456 Caitlinmann	1999 XQ_{12}	Caitlin Maureen Mann (born 1991) is a finalist in the 2009 Intel Science Talent Search (STS), a science competition for high school seniors, for her engineering project. She attends the Hathaway Brown School, Shaker Heights, Ohio	JPL · 25456
25457 Mariannamao	1999 XH_{13}	Marianna Yuling Mao (born 1991) is a finalist in the 2009 Intel Science Talent Search (STS), a science competition for high school seniors, for her physics project. She attends the Mission San Jose High School, Fremont, California	JPL · 25457
25462 Haydenmetsky	1999 XV_{18}	Hayden Craig Metsky (born 1991) is a finalist in the 2009 Intel Science Talent Search (STS), a science competition for high school seniors, for his computer science project. He attends the Millburn High School, Millburn, New Jersey	JPL · 25462
25464 Maxrabinovich	1999 XA_{24}	Maxim Rabinovich (born 1991) is a finalist in the 2009 Intel Science Talent Search (STS), a science competition for high school seniors, for his mathematics project. He attends the Shorecrest Preparatory School, St. Petersburg, Florida	JPL · 25464
25465 Rajagopalan	1999 XT_{25}	Aditya Rajagopalan (born 1991) is a finalist in the 2009 Intel Science Talent Search (STS), a science competition for high school seniors, for his biochemistry project. He attends the Choate Rosemary Hall, Wallingford, Connecticut	JPL · 25465
25468 Ramakrishna	1999 XS_{33}	Smitha Ramakrishna (born 1991) is a finalist in the 2009 Intel Science Talent Search (STS), a science competition for high school seniors, for her environmental science project. She attends the Corona del Sol High School, Tempe, Arizona	JPL · 25468
25469 Ransohoff	1999 XC_{34}	Julia Dory Ransohoff (born 1991) is a finalist in the 2009 Intel Science Talent Search (STS), a science competition for high school seniors, for her medicine and health project. She attends the Menlo-Atherton High School, Atherton, California	JPL · 25469
25472 Joanoro	1999 XL_{36}	Joan Oro, Spanish (Catalan)-American biologist and public science advocate	JPL · 25472
25475 Lizrao	1999 XY_{40}	Elizabeth Jie Rao (born 1991) is a finalist in the 2009 Intel Science Talent Search (STS), a science competition for high school seniors, for her medicine and health project. She attends the Lincoln Park High School, Chicago, Illinois	JPL · 25475
25476 Sealfon	1999 XU_{42}	Adam Benjamin Sealfon (born 1991) is a finalist in the 2009 Intel Science Talent Search (STS), a science competition for high school seniors, for his computer science project. He attends the Stuyvesant High School, New York, New York	JPL · 25476
25477 Preyashah	1999 XC_{44}	Preya Shah (born 1991) is a finalist in the 2009 Intel Science Talent Search (STS), a science competition for high school seniors, for her chemistry project. She attends the Ward Melville High School, East Setauket, New York	JPL · 25477
25478 Shrock	1999 XR_{45}	Christine Lee Shrock (born 1991) is a finalist in the 2009 Intel Science Talent Search (STS), a science competition for high school seniors, for her bioinformatics and genomics project. She attends the Ward Melville High School, East Setauket, New York	JPL · 25478
25479 Ericshyu	1999 XD_{54}	Eric Shyu (born 1991) is a finalist in the 2009 Intel Science Talent Search (STS), a science competition for high school seniors, for his chemistry project. He attends the Illinois Mathematics & Science Academy, Aurora, Illinois	JPL · 25479
25481 Willjaysun	1999 XU_{68}	William Jayang Sun (born 1991) is a finalist in the 2009 Intel Science Talent Search (STS), a science competition for high school seniors, for his biochemistry project. He attends the Parkway Central High School, Chesterfield, Missouri	JPL · 25481
25482 Tallapragada	1999 XM_{72}	Narendra Pundarik Tallapragada (born 1991) is a finalist in the 2009 Intel Science Talent Search (STS), a science competition for high school seniors, for his physics project. He attends the Thomas Jefferson High School for Science and Technology, Alexandria, Virginia	JPL · 25482
25483 Trusheim	1999 XF_{74}	Stephen Walter Trusheim (born 1990) is a finalist in the 2009 Intel Science Talent Search (STS), a science competition for high school seniors, for his bioinformatics and genomics project. He attends the Breck School, Minneapolis, Minnesota	JPL · 25483
25486 Michaelwham	1999 XF_{81}	Michael Tyler Wham (born 1990) is a finalist in the 2009 Intel Science Talent Search (STS), a science competition for high school seniors, for his zoology project. He attends the Sterling Ridge Home School, Woodlands, Texas	JPL · 25486
25488 Figueiredo	1999 XD_{83}	Joanne Figueiredo mentored a finalist in the 2009 Intel Science Talent Search (STS), a science competition for high school seniors. She teaches at the Smithtown High School West, Smithtown, New York	JPL · 25488
25490 Kevinkelly	1999 XN_{84}	Kevin Kelly mentored a finalist in the 2009 Intel Science Talent Search (STS), a science competition for high school seniors. He teaches at the Lexington High School, Lexington, Massachusetts	JPL · 25490
25491 Meador	1999 XS_{84}	Granger Meador mentored a finalist in the 2009 Intel Science Talent Search (STS), a science competition for high school seniors. He teaches at the Bartlesville High School, Bartlesville, Oklahoma	JPL · 25491
25492 Firnberg	1999 XF_{85}	Anat Firnberg mentored a finalist in the 2009 Intel Science Talent Search (STS), a science competition for high school seniors. She teaches at the Tenafly High School, Tenafly, New Jersey	JPL · 25492
25495 Michaelroddy	1999 XW_{86}	Michael Roddy mentored a finalist in the 2009 Intel Science Talent Search (STS), a science competition for high school seniors. He teaches at the Edina High School, Edina, Minnesota	JPL · 25495
25497 Brauerman	1999 XV_{87}	Susan Brauerman mentored a finalist in the 2009 Intel Science Talent Search (STS), a science competition for high school seniors. She teaches at the Bronx High School of Science, Bronx, New York	JPL · 25497

== 25501–25600 ==
back to top

Named minor planet	Provisional	This minor planet was named for...	Ref; Catalog
25509 Rodwong	1999 XF_{97}	Rod Wong mentored a finalist in the 2009 Intel Science Talent Search (STS), a science competition for high school seniors. He teaches at the Bellarmine College Preparatory School, San Jose, California	JPL · 25509
25510 Donvincent	1999 XJ_{97}	Don Vincent mentored a finalist in the 2009 Intel Science Talent Search (STS), a science competition for high school seniors. He teaches at the West High School, Madison, Wisconsin	JPL · 25510
25511 Annlipinsky	1999 XM_{97}	Ann Lipinsky mentored a finalist in the 2009 Intel Science Talent Search (STS), a science competition for high school seniors. She teaches at the John Jay High School, Cross River, New York	JPL · 25511
25512 Anncomins	1999 XT_{97}	Ann Comins mentored a finalist in the 2009 Intel Science Talent Search (STS), a science competition for high school seniors. She teaches at the James Madison Memorial High School, Madison, Wisconsin	JPL · 25512
25513 Weseley	1999 XM_{98}	Allyson Weseley mentored a finalist in the 2009 Intel Science Talent Search (STS), a science competition for high school seniors. She teaches at the Roslyn High School, Roslyn Heights, New York	JPL · 25513
25514 Lisawu	1999 XJ_{99}	Lisa Wu mentored a finalist in the 2009 Intel Science Talent Search (STS), a science competition for high school seniors. She teaches at the Thomas Jefferson High School for Science and Technology, Alexandria, Virginia	JPL · 25514
25515 Briancarey	1999 XU_{99}	Brian Carey mentored a finalist in the 2009 Intel Science Talent Search (STS), a science competition for high school seniors. He teaches at the Livingston High School, Livingston, New Jersey	JPL · 25515
25516 Davidknight	1999 XS_{100}	David Knight mentored a finalist in the 2009 Intel Science Talent Search (STS), a science competition for high school seniors. He teaches at the University High School, Irvine, California	JPL · 25516
25517 Davidlau	1999 XD_{101}	David Lau mentored a finalist in the 2009 Intel Science Talent Search (STS), a science competition for high school seniors. He teaches at the Mission San Jose High School, Fremont, California	JPL · 25517
25518 Paulcitrin	1999 XO_{101}	Paul Citrin mentored a finalist in the 2009 Intel Science Talent Search (STS), a science competition for high school seniors. He teaches at the Millburn High School, Millburn, New Jersey	JPL · 25518
25519 Bartolomeo	1999 XS_{101}	Michael Bartolomeo mentored a finalist in the 2009 Intel Science Talent Search (STS), a science competition for high school seniors. He teaches at the Shorecrest Preparatory School, St Petersburg, Florida	JPL · 25519
25520 Deronchang	1999 XV_{102}	Deron Chang mentored a finalist in the 2009 Intel Science Talent Search (STS), a science competition for high school seniors. He teaches at the Choate Rosemary Hall, Wallingford, Connecticut	JPL · 25520
25521 Stevemorgan	1999 XH_{103}	Steve Morgan mentored a finalist in the 2009 Intel Science Talent Search (STS), a science competition for high school seniors. He teaches at the Corona del Sol High School, Tempe, Arizona	JPL · 25521
25522 Roisen	1999 XK_{103}	Patrick Roisen mentored a finalist in the 2009 Intel Science Talent Search (STS), a science competition for high school seniors. He teaches at the Menlo-Atherton High School, Atherton, California	JPL · 25522
25531 Lessek	1999 XE_{133}	Justin Lessek mentored a finalist in the 2009 Intel Science Talent Search (STS), a science competition for high school seniors. He teaches at the Lincoln Park High School, Chicago, Illinois	JPL · 25531
25538 Markcarlson	1999 XN_{158}	Mark Carlson mentored a finalist in the 2009 Intel Science Talent Search (STS), a science competition for high school seniors. He teaches at the Illinois Mathematics & Science Academy, Aurora, Illinois	JPL · 25538
25539 Roberthelm	1999 XA_{159}	Robert Helm mentored a finalist in the 2009 Intel Science Talent Search (STS), a science competition for high school seniors. He teaches at the Methacton High School, Norristown, Pennsylvania	JPL · 25539
25541 Greathouse	1999 XB_{160}	Kenneth Greathouse mentored a finalist in the 2009 Intel Science Talent Search (STS), a science competition for high school seniors. He teaches at the Parkway Central High School, Chesterfield, Missouri	JPL · 25541
25542 Garabedian	1999 XH_{160}	Wayne Garabedian mentored a finalist in the 2009 Intel Science Talent Search (STS), a science competition for high school seniors. He teaches at the Clovis West High School, Fresno, California	JPL · 25542
25543 Fruen	1999 XR_{160}	Lois Fruen mentored a finalist in the 2009 Intel Science Talent Search (STS), a science competition for high school seniors. She teaches at the Breck School, Minneapolis, Minnesota	JPL · 25543
25544 Renerogers	1999 XU_{161}	Rene Rogers mentored a finalist in the 2009 Intel Science Talent Search (STS), a science competition for high school seniors. She teaches at the Sterling Ridge Home School, Woodlands, Texas	JPL · 25544
25549 Jonsauer	1999 XZ_{167}	Jonothon Sauer mentored a finalist in the 2009 Intel Science Talent Search (STS), a science competition for high school seniors. He teaches at the William Mason High School, Mason, Ohio	JPL · 25549
25551 Drewhall	1999 XP_{168}	Drew Hall (born 1982), together with Richard Gaster, a fellow student at Stanford University, won the "Change the World" competition, arranged by the IEEE presidents in conjunction with the organization's 125th anniversary in 2009. Their winning project was entitled "Nanolab: A Handheld Diagnostic Laboratory"	JPL · 25551
25552 Gaster	1999 XS_{168}	Richard Gaster (born 1984), with Drew Hall, won the 2009 Student Humanitarian Supreme Prize of the IEEE "Change the World" competition. Their "Nanolab" project applies engineering and leadership skills to benefit humanity by solving the problem of limited availability of medical laboratories in third-world countries	JPL · 25552
25553 Ivanlafer	1999 XC_{169}	Ivan Lavander Candido Ferreira (born 1991) was awarded second place in the 2009 Intel International Science and Engineering Fair for his microbiology project. He attends the Colégio Guilherme Dumont Villares, São Paulo, SP, Brasil	JPL · 25553
25554 Jayaranjan	1999 XG_{169}	Nirusan Jayaranjan (born 1993) was awarded second place in the 2009 Intel International Science and Engineering Fair for his electrical and mechanical engineering project. He attends the College Sturgeon Heights Collegiate, Winnipeg, Manitoba, Canada	JPL · 25554
25555 Ratnavarma	1999 XJ_{169}	Ratna Varma (born 1992) was awarded second place in the 2009 Intel International Science and Engineering Fair for her medicine and health sciences project. She attends the A. B. Lucas Secondary School, London, Ontario, Canada	JPL · 25555
25560 Chaihaoxi	1999 XD_{173}	Chai Haoxi (born 1991) was awarded second place in the 2009 Intel International Science and Engineering Fair for his plant sciences team project. He attends the No.1 High School Attached to Central China Normal University, Wuhan, Hubei, China	JPL · 25560
25561 Leehyunki	1999 XN_{173}	Lee Hyun Ki (born 1992) was awarded first place in the 2009 Intel International Science and Engineering Fair for his computer science team project. He attends the Chengdu International School, Chengdu, Sichuan, China	JPL · 25561
25562 Limdarren	1999 XJ_{174}	Lim Darren (born 1993) was awarded first place in the 2009 Intel International Science and Engineering Fair for his computer science team project. He attends the Chengdu International School, Chengdu, Sichuan, China	JPL · 25562
25565 Lusiyang	1999 XM_{175}	Lu Siyang (born 1991) was awarded second place in the 2009 Intel International Science and Engineering Fair for her plant sciences team project. She attends the No. 1 Middle School Attached To Central China Normal University, Wuhan, Hubei, China	JPL · 25565
25566 Panying	1999 XM_{177}	Pan Ying (born 1989) was awarded second place in the 2009 Intel International Science and Engineering Fair for her materials and bioengineering project. She attends the Affiliated High School of South China Normal University, Guangzhou, Guangdong, China	JPL · 25566
25570 Kesun	1999 XT_{194}	Sun Ke (born 1991) was awarded second place in the 2009 Intel International Science and Engineering Fair for her plant sciences team project. She attends the No.1 Middle School Attached To Central China Normal University, Wuhan, Hubei, China	JPL · 25570
25573 Wanghaoyu	1999 XT_{205}	Wang Haoyu (born 1992) was awarded second place in the 2009 Intel International Science and Engineering Fair for his plant sciences team project. He attends the Beijing 101 Middle School, Beijing, China	JPL · 25573
25577 Wangmanqiang	1999 XN_{213}	Wang Manqiang (born 1992) was awarded second place in the 2009 Intel International Science and Engineering Fair for his plant sciences team project. He attends the No.80 High School of Beijing, Beijing, China	JPL · 25577
25580 Xuelai	1999 XU_{220}	Xue Lai (born 1992) was awarded first place in the 2009 Intel International Science and Engineering Fair for his computer science team project. He attends the Chengdu International School, Chengdu, Sichuan, China	JPL · 25580
25584 Zhangnelson	1999 XO_{221}	Zhang Nelson (born 1993) was awarded second place in the 2009 Intel International Science and Engineering Fair for his computer science project. He attends the Shanghai American School, Shanghai, China	JPL · 25584
25589 Danicamckellar	1999 XY_{231}	Danica McKellar (born 1975) is an American actress, mathematician, and author. McKellar has published research works and wrote several popular books on math. She has been a strong advocate for math education, particularly encouraging young girls and woman to pursue math.	IAU · 25589
25593 Camillejordan	1999 YA_{5}	Camille Jordan (1838–1921), a French mathematician.	JPL · 25593
25594 Kessler	1999 YA_{9}	Marvin Kessler, American member of the Northeast Kansas Amateur Astronomer's League	JPL · 25594
25597 Glendahill	1999 YS_{14}	Glenda Hill (born 1948) has volunteered in the Lowell Observatory Archives since 2010. She has catalogued the correspondence of V.M. Slipher, Percival Lowell and Wrexie Louise Leonard. Glenda has become quite adept at deciphering poor handwriting. She is married to outreach volunteer Gene Hill.	JPL · 25597

== 25601–25700 ==
back to top

Named minor planet	Provisional	This minor planet was named for...	Ref; Catalog
25601 Francopacini	2000 AX_{2}	Franco Pacini, Italian astrophysicist †	MPC · 25601
25602 Ucaronia	2000 AA_{3}	Umberto Caronia, father of co-discoverer Alfredo Caronia †	MPC · 25602
25604 Karlin	2000 AM_{6}	Samuel Karlin, American statistician and mathematician, member of the National Academy of Sciences and recipient of the National Medal of Science	JPL · 25604
25606 Chiangshenghao	2000 AT_{7}	Chiang Sheng-Hao (born 1991) was awarded second place in the 2009 Intel International Science and Engineering Fair for his mathematical sciences project. He attends the National Experimental High School at Hsinchu Science Park, Hsinchu City, Chinese Taipei	JPL · 25606
25607 Tsengiching	2000 AN_{10}	Tseng I-Ching (born 1993) was awarded first place and Best in Category in the 2009 Intel International Science and Engineering Fair for her microbiology project. She attends the National Taichung Girl's Senior High School, Taichung, Taiwan, Chinese Taipei	JPL · 25607
25608 Hincapie	2000 AY_{10}	Melisa Hincapie (born 1991) was awarded second place in the 2009 Intel International Science and Engineering Fair for her energy and transportation project. She attends the Colegio La Compania de Maria La Ensenanza, Medellin, Antioquia, Colombia	JPL · 25608
25609 Bogantes	2000 AA_{12}	Fabiola Bogantes Jimenez (born 1991) was awarded second place in the 2009 Intel International Science and Engineering Fair for her electrical and mechanical engineering team project. She attends the Colegio Tecnico Profesional de San Sebastian, San Jose, Costa Rica	JPL · 25609
25611 Mabellin	2000 AY_{20}	Mabellin Fallas Quesada (born 1990) was awarded second place in the 2009 Intel International Science and Engineering Fair for her electrical and mechanical engineering team project. She attends the Colegio Tecnico Profesional de San Sebastian, San Jose, Costa Rica	JPL · 25611
25612 Yaoskalucia	2000 AZ_{22}	Yaoska Lucia Hernandez Duarte (born 1992) was awarded second place in the 2009 Intel International Science and Engineering Fair for her electrical and mechanical engineering team project. She attends the Colegio Tecnico Profesional de San Sebastian, San Jose, Costa Rica	JPL · 25612
25613 Bubenicek	2000 AL_{24}	Petr Bubeníček (born 1990) was awarded first place in the 2009 Intel International Science and Engineering Fair for his electrical and mechanical engineering team project. He attends the Gymnazium Aloise Jiraska, Litomyšl, Czech Republic	JPL · 25613
25614 Jankral	2000 AE_{28}	Jan Král (born 1989) was awarded first place in the 2009 Intel International Science and Engineering Fair for his electrical and mechanical engineering team project. He attends the Gymnazium Aloise Jiraska, Litomyšl, Czech Republic	JPL · 25614
25615 Votroubek	2000 AR_{31}	Marek Votroubek (born 1990) was awarded first place in the 2009 Intel International Science and Engineering Fair for his electrical and mechanical engineering team project. He attends the Gymnazium Aloise Jiraska, Litomyšl, Czech Republic	JPL · 25615
25616 Riinuots	2000 AJ_{32}	Riinu Ots (born 1989) was awarded second place in the 2009 Intel International Science and Engineering Fair for her environmental science project. She attends the Hugo Treffner Gymnasium, Tartu, Estonia	JPL · 25616
25617 Thomasnesch	2000 AN_{32}	Thomas Nesch (born 1989) was awarded first place in the 2009 Intel International Science and Engineering Fair for his electrical and mechanical engineering project. He attends the Technische Oberschule Stuttgart, Stuttgart, Germany	JPL · 25617
25619 Martonspohn	2000 AQ_{34}	Marton Spohn (born 1989) was awarded second place in the 2009 Intel International Science and Engineering Fair for his cellular and molecular biology project. He attends the Fazekas Mihaly Secondary Grammar School, Budapest, Hungary	JPL · 25619
25620 Jayaprakash	2000 AL_{40}	Vishnu Jayaprakash (born 1993) was awarded second place in the 2009 Intel International Science and Engineering Fair for his energy and transportation project. He attends the Chettinad Vidyashram, Chennai, Tamil Nadu, India	JPL · 25620
25624 Kronecker	2000 AK_{48}	Leopold Kronecker, German mathematician.	JPL · 25624
25625 Verdenet	2000 AN_{48}	Michel Verdenet, French amateur astronomer, chairman of the Association française des observateurs d'étoiles variables (AFOÉV, French Association of Variable Star Observers) † ‡ +	MPC · 25625
25628 Kummer	2000 AZ_{50}	Ernst Eduard Kummer, 19th-century German mathematician	JPL · 25628
25629 Mukherjee	2000 AH_{52}	Anish Mukherjee (born 1992) was awarded second place in the 2009 Intel International Science and Engineering Fair for his electrical and mechanical engineering team project. He attends the South Point High School, Kolkata, West Bengal, India	JPL · 25629
25630 Sarkar	2000 AT_{53}	Debarghya Sarkar (born 1991) was awarded second place in the 2009 Intel International Science and Engineering Fair for his electrical and mechanical engineering team project. He attends the South Point High School, Kolkata, West Bengal, India	JPL · 25630
25636 Vaishnav	2000 AS_{62}	Hetal Kanjibhai Vaishnav (born 1992) was awarded second place in the 2009 Intel International Science and Engineering Fair for her environmental management project. She attends the Late Shree S.G Dholakiya Memorial High School, Rajkot, Gujarat, India	JPL · 25636
25638 Ahissar	2000 AB_{64}	Shira Ahissar (born 1991) was awarded second place in the 2009 Intel International Science and Engineering Fair for her behavioral and social sciences project. She attends the Aharon Katzir High School, Rehovot, Israel	JPL · 25638
25639 Fedina	2000 AV_{64}	Ksenia G. Fedina (born 1992) was awarded second place in the 2009 Intel International Science and Engineering Fair for her chemistry project. She attends the Moscow Chemical Lyceum # 1303, Moscow, Russia	JPL · 25639
25640 Klintefelt	2000 AA_{65}	Philippe Klintefelt Collet (born 1990) was awarded second place in the 2009 Intel International Science and Engineering Fair for his behavioral and social sciences project. He attends the Goteborgs Hogre Samskola, Goteborg, Sweden	JPL · 25640
25642 Adiseshan	2000 AW_{65}	Tara Anjali Adiseshan (born 1994) was awarded first place in the 2009 Intel International Science and Engineering Fair for her animal sciences project. She also received the Intel Young Scientist Award. She attends the Ramana Academy, Charlottesville, Virginia, U.S.A	JPL · 25642
25645 Alexanderyan	2000 AZ_{73}	Ryan Cherian Alexander (born 1993) was awarded first place and Best in Category in the 2009 Intel International Science and Engineering Fair for his energy and transportation project. He attends the R. C. Clark High School, Plano, Texas, U.S.A	JPL · 25645
25646 Noniearora	2000 AL_{74}	Shubhangi Arora (born 1993) was awarded first place in the 2009 Intel International Science and Engineering Fair for her microbiology project. She attends the Novi High School, Novi, Michigan, U.S.A	JPL · 25646
25648 Baghel	2000 AJ_{77}	Prateek Singh Baghel (born 1991) was awarded second place in the 2009 Intel International Science and Engineering Fair for his cellular and molecular biology project. He attends the Shaker High School, Latham, New York, U.S.A	JPL · 25648
25650 Shaubakshi	2000 AX_{79}	Shaunak Krishan Bakshi (born 1993) was awarded first place in the 2009 Intel International Science and Engineering Fair for his behavioral and social sciences team project. He also received the European Union Contest for Young Scientists Award. He attends the Manhasset High School, Manhasset, New York, U.S.A	JPL · 25650
25652 Maddieball	2000 AQ_{83}	Madeleine Amanda Ball (born 1992) was awarded second place in the 2009 Intel International Science and Engineering Fair for her animal sciences project. She attends the Ursuline Academy of Dallas, Dallas, Texas, U.S.A	JPL · 25652
25653 Baskaran	2000 AV_{84}	Akshai Baskaran (born 1992) was awarded first place in the 2009 Intel International Science and Engineering Fair for his energy and transportation project. He attends the Kennewick High School, Kennewick, Washington, U.S.A	JPL · 25653
25655 Baupeter	2000 AU_{86}	Peter Bau (born 1992) was awarded second place in the 2009 Intel International Science and Engineering Fair for his animal sciences project. He attends the Chamblee Charter High School, Chamblee, Georgia, U.S.A	JPL · 25655
25656 Bejnood	2000 AF_{87}	Alborz Bejnood (born 1992) was awarded second place in the 2009 Intel International Science and Engineering Fair for his microbiology team project. He attends the Oak Ridge High School, Oak Ridge, Tennessee, U.S.A	JPL · 25656
25657 Berkowitz	2000 AM_{87}	Hannah M Berkowitz (born 1993) was awarded first place in the 2009 Intel International Science and Engineering Fair for her environmental management team project. She attends the Long Beach High School, Lido Beach, New York, U.S.A	JPL · 25657
25658 Bokor	2000 AE_{88}	Jacqueline B Bokor (born 1993) was awarded first place in the 2009 Intel International Science and Engineering Fair for her environmental management team project. She attends the Long Beach High School, Lido Beach, New York, U.S.A	JPL · 25658
25659 Liboynton	2000 AG_{88}	Li Sallou Boynton (born 1991) was awarded first place in the 2009 Intel International Science and Engineering Fair for her environmental science project. She also received the Intel Young Scientist Award. She attends the Bellaire High School, Bellaire, Texas, U.S.A	JPL · 25659
25662 Chonofsky	2000 AA_{89}	Mark Adrian Chonofsky (born 1992) was awarded first place and Best in Category in the 2009 Intel International Science and Engineering Fair for his plant sciences project. He attends the Lexington High School, Lexington, Massachusetts, U.S.A	JPL · 25662
25663 Nickmycroft	2000 AD_{89}	Nicholas Mycroft Christensen (born 1991) is a finalist in the 2010 Intel Science Talent Search (STS) for his physics project. He was also awarded second place in the 2009 Intel International Science and Engineering Fair. He attends the Wetumpka High School, Wetumpka, Alabama, U.S.A	JPL · 25663
25669 Kristinrose	2000 AJ_{95}	Kristin Rose Cordwell (born 1990) was awarded second place in the 2009 Intel International Science and Engineering Fair for her mathematical sciences project. She attends the Manzano High School, Albuquerque, New Mexico, U.S.A	JPL · 25669
25670 Densley	2000 AT_{95}	Riley Taylor Densley (born 1991) was awarded second place in the 2009 Intel International Science and Engineering Fair for his physics team project. He attends the Bingham High School, South Jordan, Utah, U.S.A	JPL · 25670
25673 Di Mascio	2000 AJ_{99}	Michael Vincent Di Mascio (born 1992) was awarded second place in the 2009 Intel International Science and Engineering Fair for his physics project. He attends the Waynesville High School, Waynesville, Ohio, U.S.A	JPL · 25673
25674 Kevinellis	2000 AT_{99}	Kevin Michael Ellis (born 1991) was awarded first place and Best in Category in the 2009 Intel International Science and Engineering Fair for his computer science project. He attends the Catlin Gabel School, Beaverton, Oregon, U.S.A	JPL · 25674
25676 Jesseellison	2000 AG_{102}	Jesse Kane Ellison (born 1991) was awarded second place in the 2009 Intel International Science and Engineering Fair for his electrical and mechanical engineering project. He attends the Bayfield High School, Bayfield, Colorado, U.S.A	JPL · 25676
25677 Aaronenten	2000 AK_{102}	Aaron Christopher Enten (born 1991) was awarded second place in the 2009 Intel International Science and Engineering Fair for his materials and bioengineering project. He attends the American Heritage School Plantation, Plantation, Florida, U.S.A	JPL · 25677
25678 Ericfoss	2000 AU_{105}	Eric A. Foss (born 1991) was awarded second place in the 2009 Intel International Science and Engineering Fair for his physics project. He attends the Kentwood High School, Covington, Washington, U.S.A	JPL · 25678
25679 Andrewguo	2000 AX_{105}	Andrew Yi Guo (born 1991) was awarded second place in the 2009 Intel International Science and Engineering Fair for his medicine and health science s team project. He attends the North Carolina School of Science and Mathematics, Durham, North Carolina, U.S.A	JPL · 25679
25680 Walterhansen	2000 AP_{106}	Walter Preston Hansen (born 1992) was awarded second place in the 2009 Intel International Science and Engineering Fair for his physics team project. He attends the Bingham High School, South Jordan, Utah, U.S.A	JPL · 25680
25683 Haochenhong	2000 AA_{114}	Haochen Hong (born 1992) was awarded first place in the 2009 Intel International Science and Engineering Fair for his physics team project. He attends the La Cueva High School, Albuquerque, New Mexico, U.S.A	JPL · 25683
25685 Katlinhornig	2000 AK_{116}	Katlin Jayne Hornig (born 1991) was awarded first place in the 2009 Intel International Science and Engineering Fair for her behavioral and social sciences project. She attends the Sargent High School, Monte Vista, Colorado, U.S.A	JPL · 25685
25686 Stephoskins	2000 AF_{117}	Stephanie Page Hoskins (born 1992) was awarded second place in the 2009 Intel International Science and Engineering Fair for her microbiology project. She attends the Lincoln Park Academy, Fort Pierce, Florida, U.S.A	JPL · 25686
25688 Hritzo	2000 AV_{120}	Bernadette Ann Hritzo (born 1993) was awarded second place in the 2009 Intel International Science and Engineering Fair for her animal sciences project. She attends the Villa Joseph Marie High School, Holland, Pennsylvania, U.S.A	JPL · 25688
25689 Duannihuang	2000 AL_{121}	Duanni Huang (born 1990) was awarded first place in the 2009 Intel International Science and Engineering Fair for his physics team project. He attends the La Cueva High School, Albuquerque, New Mexico, U.S.A	JPL · 25689
25690 Iredale	2000 AP_{123}	Marley Elizabeth Iredale (born 1992) was awarded first place and Best in Category in the 2009 Intel International Science and Engineering Fair for her earth and planetary science project. She attends the Sequim High School, Sequim, Washington, U.S.A	JPL · 25690
25693 Ishitani	2000 AQ_{124}	Catherine Elizabeth Ishitani (born 1992) was awarded second place in the 2009 Intel International Science and Engineering Fair for her medicine and health sciences project. She attends the Mayo High School, Rochester, Minnesota, U.S.A	JPL · 25693
25695 Eileenjang	2000 AD_{125}	Eileen Kao Jang (born 1991) was awarded second place in the 2009 Intel International Science and Engineering Fair for her environmental science project. She attends the North Carolina School of Science and Mathematics, Durham, North Carolina, U.S.A	JPL · 25695
25696 Kylejones	2000 AE_{125}	Kyle Jones (born 1990) was awarded second place in the 2009 Intel International Science and Engineering Fair for his cellular and molecular biology project. He attends the Villages High School, The Villages, Florida, U.S.A	JPL · 25696
25697 Kadiyala	2000 AA_{126}	Vishnu Kiran Kadiyala (born 1992) was awarded second place in the 2009 Intel International Science and Engineering Fair for his medicine and health sciences team project. He attends the duPont Manual Magnet High School, Louisville, Kentucky, U.S.A	JPL · 25697
25698 Snehakannan	2000 AQ_{126}	Sneha Trichy Kannan (born 1992) was awarded second place in the 2009 Intel International Science and Engineering Fair for her medicine and health sciences project. She attends the Montgomery Blair High School, Silver Spring, Maryland, U.S.A	JPL · 25698

== 25701–25800 ==
back to top

Named minor planet	Provisional	This minor planet was named for...	Ref; Catalog
25701 Alexkeeler	2000 AE_{128}	Alex Keeler (born 1994) was awarded second place in the 2009 Intel International Science and Engineering Fair for his biochemistry team project. He attends the Villages High School, The Villages, Florida, U.S.A	JPL · 25701
25704 Kendrick	2000 AO_{128}	Alexander Kent Kendrick (born 1993) was awarded first place and Best in Category in the 2009 Intel International Science and Engineering Fair for his electrical and mechanical engineering project. He attends the Los Alamos High School, Los Alamos, New Mexico, U.S.A	JPL · 25704
25706 Cekoscielski	2000 AU_{139}	Caitlyn Elizabeth Koscielski (born 1991) was awarded second place in the 2009 Intel International Science and Engineering Fair for her chemistry team project. She attends the Marian High School, Mishawaka, Indiana, U.S.A	JPL · 25706
25708 Vedantkumar	2000 AU_{141}	Vedant Subramaniam Kumar (born 1993) was awarded second place in the 2009 Intel International Science and Engineering Fair for his computer science project. He attends the duPont Manual Magnet High School, Louisville, Kentucky, U.S.A	JPL · 25708
25710 Petelandgren	2000 AL_{151}	Peter Chal Landgren (born 1990) was awarded second place in the 2009 Intel International Science and Engineering Fair for his environmental management team project. He attends the Westview High School, Portland, Oregon, U.S.A	JPL · 25710
25711 Lebovits	2000 AE_{152}	Elias Lebovits (born 1991) was awarded second place in the 2009 Intel International Science and Engineering Fair for his materials and bioengineering team project. He attends the Ramaz Upper School, New York, New York, U.S.A	JPL · 25711
25714 Aprillee	2000 AW_{160}	April S. Lee (born 1991) was awarded second place in the 2009 Intel International Science and Engineering Fair for her plant sciences project. She attends the Stuyvesant High School, New York, New York, U.S.A	JPL · 25714
25715 Lizmariemako	2000 AY_{162}	Elizabeth Marie Mako (born 1991) was awarded second place in the 2009 Intel International Science and Engineering Fair for her electrical and mechanical engineering project. She attends the W.T. Woodson High School, Fairfax, Virginia, U.S.A	JPL · 25715
25717 Ritikmal	2000 AW_{168}	Ritik Malhotra (born 1992) was awarded second place in the 2009 Intel International Science and Engineering Fair for his electrical and mechanical engineering project. He attends the Lynbrook High School, San Jose, California, U.S.A	JPL · 25717
25720 Mallidi	2000 AO_{172}	Sandeep Mallidi (born 1991) was awarded second place in the 2009 Intel International Science and Engineering Fair for his earth and planetary science team project. He attends the Westview High School, Portland, Oregon, U.S.A	JPL · 25720
25721 Anartya	2000 AA_{174}	Anartya Mandal (born 1990) was awarded first place and Best in Category in the 2009 Intel International Science and Engineering Fair for his biochemistry project. He attends the Boston Latin School, Boston, Massachusetts, U.S.A	JPL · 25721
25722 Evanmarshall	2000 AV_{174}	Evan George Marshall (born 1992) was awarded second place in the 2009 Intel International Science and Engineering Fair for his earth and planetary science team project. He attends the Westview High School, Portland, Oregon, U.S.A	JPL · 25722
25723 Shamascharak	2000 AX_{174}	Shamik Mascharak (born 1993) was awarded second place in the 2009 Intel International Science and Engineering Fair for his chemistry project. He attends the Santa Cruz High School, Santa Cruz, California, U.S.A	JPL · 25723
25725 McCormick	2000 AW_{180}	Lydia L McCormick (born 1992) was awarded first place in the 2009 Intel International Science and Engineering Fair for her animal sciences project. She attends the Jefferson County International Baccalaureate, Birmingham, Alabama, U.S.A	JPL · 25725
25727 Karsonmiller	2000 AN_{182}	Karson M. Miller (born 1991) was awarded second place in the 2009 Intel International Science and Engineering Fair for his electrical and mechanical engineering project. He attends the John L. Miller-Great Neck North High School, Great Neck, New York, U.S.A	JPL · 25727
25742 Amandablanco	2000 AV_{228}	Amanda Blanco (born 1933) is a photographer who has volunteered at Lowell since 2011. Her projects have included photographing Lowell children's summer camps and Observatory special events. Her current project is photographing flowers and trees on the Observatory campus to be used in future outdoor signage.	JPL · 25742
25743 Serrato	2000 AA_{229}	Roger Serrato (born 1954) has volunteered at Lowell Observatory since 2012. He has recently been involved in special projects, among them creating a comprehensive file about the Discovery Channel Telescope and indexing/digitizing all of the Observatory's newsletters dating back to 1988.	JPL · 25743
25744 Surajmishra	2000 AW_{233}	Suraj K. Mishra (born 1991) was awarded first place in the 2009 Intel International Science and Engineering Fair for his cellular and molecular biology project. He attends the Mills E. Godwin High School, Richmond, Virginia, U.S.A	JPL · 25744
25745 Schimmelpenninck	2000 AC_{242}	Marie Schimmelpenninck (born 1952) has been a Lowell Observatory volunteer since 2002. She was a daytime tour guide and solar telescope operator for 13 years. She is presently working on identifying the Observatory's flowers and trees for future Lowell campus signage.	JPL · 25745
25746 Nickscoville	2000 AF_{242}	Nicholas Z. Scoville (born 1945) is an astronomer at the California Institute of Technology.	JPL · 25746
25747 Nicerasmus	2000 AH_{242}	Nicolas Erasmus (born 1985) is an instrument scientist at the South African Astronomical Observatory (Cape Town, South Africa). His early research was in experimental laser physics, and he transitioned into working on photometric observations of asteroids and astronomical instrumentation.	IAU · 25747
25750 Miwnay	2000 BB_{4}	Miwnay was the name of a Sogdian abandoned wife from Samarkand.	JPL · 25750
25751 Mokshagundam	2000 BS_{6}	Shilpa Mokshagundam (born 1992) was awarded second place in the 2009 Intel International Science and Engineering Fair for her medicine and health sciences team project. She attends the duPont Manual High School, Prospect, Kentucky, U.S.A	JPL · 25751
25760 Annaspitz	2000 BF_{34}	Anna Spitz (born 1954) is Education and Public Outreach Lead for the NASA OSIRIS-REx asteroid sample return mission	JPL · 25760
25763 Naveenmurali	2000 CN_{4}	Naveen Murali (born 1992) was awarded second place in the 2009 Intel International Science and Engineering Fair for his materials and bioengineering team project. He attends the Staples High School, Westport, Connecticut, U.S.A	JPL · 25763
25764 Divyanag	2000 CQ_{11}	Divya Nag (born 1991) was awarded second place in the 2009 Intel International Science and Engineering Fair for her earth and planetary science project. She attends the Mira Loma High School, Sacramento, California, U.S.A	JPL · 25764
25765 Heatherlynne	2000 CS_{11}	Heather Lynne Nielsen (born 1992) was awarded second place in the 2009 Intel International Science and Engineering Fair for her biochemistry team project. She attends the Villages High School, The Villages, Florida, U.S.A	JPL · 25765
25766 Nosarzewski	2000 CX_{17}	Benjamin Lee Nosarzewski (born 1991) was awarded second place in the 2009 Intel International Science and Engineering Fair for his physics project. He attends the Paul Laurence Dunbar High School, Lexington, Kentucky, U.S.A	JPL · 25766
25767 Stevennoyce	2000 CG_{20}	Steven Gary Noyce (born 1991) was awarded second place in the 2009 Intel International Science and Engineering Fair for his materials and bioengineering project. He attended the American Fork High School, American Fork, Utah, U.S.A	JPL · 25767
25768 Nussbaum	2000 CD_{24}	Trisha Paige Nussbaum (born 1991) was awarded second place in the 2009 Intel International Science and Engineering Fair for her behavioral and social sciences project. She attends the Roslyn High School, Roslyn Heights, New York, U.S.A	JPL · 25768
25769 Munaoli	2000 CL_{24}	Muna Oli (born 1992) was awarded second place in the 2009 Intel International Science and Engineering Fair for her medicine and health sciences project. She attends the Eastside High School, Gainesville, Florida, U.S.A	JPL · 25769
25772 Ashpatra	2000 CB_{27}	Ashutosh Patra (born 1991) was awarded first place in the 2009 Intel International Science and Engineering Fair for his energy and transportation team project. He attends the Sunset High School, Portland, Oregon, U.S.A	JPL · 25772
25775 Danielpeng	2000 CF_{31}	Daniel Y. Peng (born 1991) was awarded second place in the 2009 Intel International Science and Engineering Fair for his materials and bioengineering team project. He attends the Monta Vista High School, Cupertino, California, U.S.A	JPL · 25775
25778 Csere	2000 CQ_{34}	Elemír Csere, 20th-century Slovak amateur astronomer, founder of the public observatory in Hlohovec and its first director	JPL · 25778
25781 Rajendra	2000 CF_{38}	Ashoka Sanjaya Rajendra (born 1991) was awarded first place and Best in Category in the 2009 Intel International Science and Engineering Fair for his medicine and health sciences project. He attends the Loudoun County Academy of Science, Sterling, Virginia, U.S.A	JPL · 25781
25783 Brandontyler	2000 CM_{39}	Brandon Tyler Ramirez (born 1991) was awarded second place in the 2009 Intel International Science and Engineering Fair for his physics team project.	JPL · 25783
25793 Chrisanchez	2000 CS_{65}	Christopher Allen Sanchez (born 1992) was awarded second place in the 2009 Intel International Science and Engineering Fair for his plant sciences project.	JPL · 25793
25798 Reneeschaaf	2000 CU_{82}	Renee Louise Schaaf (born 1991) was awarded second place in the 2009 Intel International Science and Engineering Fair for her energy and transportation project.	JPL · 25798
25799 Anmaschlegel	2000 CC_{83}	Angela Marie Schlegel (born 1991) was awarded second place in the 2009 Intel International Science and Engineering Fair for her plant sciences project.	JPL · 25799
25800 Glukhovsky	2000 CG_{83}	Lisa Doreen Glukhovsky (born 1986), a 2004 Talent finalist, was awarded first place and Best in Category in the 2003 Intel International Science and Engineering Fair for her earth and space sciences project. She is also Recipient of the Young Scientist Award.	JPL · 25800

== 25801–25900 ==
back to top

Named minor planet	Provisional	This minor planet was named for...	Ref; Catalog
25801 Oliviaschwob	2000 CR_{84}	Olivia Catherine Schwob (born 1992) was awarded first place in the 2009 Intel International Science and Engineering Fair for her behavioral and social sciences project. She also received the Intel Young Scientist Award. She attends the Boston Latin School, Boston, Massachusetts, U.S.A	JPL · 25801
25807 Baharshah	2000 CU_{93}	Bahar Bipin Shah (born 1991) was awarded second place in the 2009 Intel International Science and Engineering Fair for her medicine and health sciences project. She attends the Canterbury School, Fort Myers, Florida, U.S.A	JPL · 25807
25811 Richardteo	2000 DE_{1}	Richard Teo Keng Siang (1972–2012), a Singapore cosmetic surgeon.	JPL · 25811
25813 Savannahshaw	2000 DW_{18}	Savannah Shaw (born 1992) was awarded second place in the 2009 Intel International Science and Engineering Fair for her biochemistry team project. She attends the Villages Charter High School, The Villages, Florida, U.S.A	JPL · 25813
25814 Preesinghal	2000 DF_{24}	Preeti Singhal (born 1993) was awarded second place in the 2009 Intel International Science and Engineering Fair for her biochemistry project. She attends the Arlington High School, Arlington, Texas, U.S.A	JPL · 25814
25815 Scottskirlo	2000 DM_{26}	Scott Alexander Skirlo (born 1990) was awarded first place and Best in Category in the 2009 Intel International Science and Engineering Fair for his materials and bioengineering project. He attends the Thomas Jefferson High School for Science and Technology, Alexandria, Virginia, U.S.A	JPL · 25815
25817 Tahilramani	2000 DQ_{31}	Mayank Tahilramani (born 1991) was awarded second place in the 2009 Intel International Science and Engineering Fair for his microbiology project. He attends the Peachtree Ridge High School, Suwanee, Georgia, U.S.A	JPL · 25817
25819 Tripathi	2000 DW_{32}	Maanas Tripathi (born 1992) was awarded second place in the 2009 Intel International Science and Engineering Fair for his environmental management team project. He attends the Westview High School, Portland, Oregon, U.S.A	JPL · 25819
25822 Carolinejune	2000 DH_{72}	Caroline June Trippel (born 1991) was awarded second place in the 2009 Intel International Science and Engineering Fair for her chemistry team project. She attends the Marian High School, Mishawaka, Indiana, U.S.A	JPL · 25822
25823 Dentrujillo	2000 DV_{73}	Dennis Paul Trujillo (born 1992) was awarded second place in the 2009 Intel International Science and Engineering Fair for his physics team project. He attends the McCurdy High School, Espanola, New Mexico, U.S.A	JPL · 25823
25824 Viviantsang	2000 DU_{75}	Vivian Connie Tsang (born 1991) was awarded second place in the 2009 Intel International Science and Engineering Fair for her environmental management project. She attends the Sunset High School, Portland, Oregon, U.S.A	JPL · 25824
25832 Van Scoyoc	2000 EN_{9}	Amy Elizabeth Van Scoyoc (born 1991) was awarded second place in the 2009 Intel International Science and Engineering Fair for her environmental science project. She attends the East Hampton High School, East Hampton, New York, U.S.A	JPL · 25832
25834 Vechinski	2000 EN_{19}	Ashley Kate Vechinski (born 1994) was awarded second place in the 2009 Intel International Science and Engineering Fair for her computer science team project. She attends the Life Christian Academy, Harvest, Alabama, U.S.A	JPL · 25834
25835 Tomzega	2000 EO_{20}	Tom Zega (born 1973), a scientist at the University of Arizona's Lunar and Planetary Laboratory.	JPL · 25835
25836 Harishvemuri	2000 ER_{29}	Harish Srikar Vemuri (born 1991) was awarded second place in the 2009 Intel International Science and Engineering Fair for his environmental management team project. He attends the Westview High School, Portland, Oregon, U.S.A	JPL · 25836
25851 Browning	2000 EE_{120}	Joyce R. Browning, (1943–2019) was a long time member of Lowell Observatory's advisory board. She volunteered her time and talent helping Lowell Observatory during special events, including the 2017 solar eclipse. Joyce was dedicated to volunteering and sharing her knowledge.	JPL · 25851
25858 Donherbert	2000 EO_{204}	Don Herbert (a.k.a. "Mr. Wizard", 1917–2007) was the creator and host of Watch Mr. Wizard and Mr. Wizard's World, programs that brought science to millions of children from 1950 to 1990 and that inspired generations of budding scientists.	JPL · 25858
25864 Banič	2000 GR_{82}	Štefan Banič, 19th–20th-century Slovak-American inventor of the parachute	JPL · 25864
25867 DeMuth	2000 HK_{66}	Mary DeMuth (born 1954) has worked at Lowell Observatory since 2001, starting as the Observatory's front office receptionist, then in Public Programs as an educator, then in scheduling and now as Volunteer Coordinator.	JPL · 25867
25869 Jacoby	2000 JP_{70}	George Jacoby (born 1948) is currently deputy director for Technology at Lowell Observatory, responsible for the oversight of Lowell's observing facilities as well as the instrument, engineering, and IT groups. Previously he was director of WIYN and program head of the NOAO Office of Science.	JPL · 25869
25870 Panchovigil	2000 KB_{14}	Francisco ("Pancho") Martin Vigil (born 1990) was awarded second place in the 2009 Intel International Science and Engineering Fair for his physics team project. He attends the McCurdy High School, Espanola, New Mexico, U.S.A	JPL · 25870
25875 Wickramasekara	2000 OT_{52}	Sajith M. Wickramasekara (born 1991) was awarded second place in the 2009 Intel International Science and Engineering Fair for his medicine and health sciences team project. He attends the North Carolina School of Science and Mathematics, Durham, North Carolina, U.S.A	JPL · 25875
25877 Katherinexue	2000 QN_{41}	Katherine Shaohua Xue (born 1991) was awarded second place in the 2009 Intel International Science and Engineering Fair for her microbiology team project. She attends the Oak Ridge High School, Oak Ridge, Tennessee, U.S.A	JPL · 25877
25878 Sihengyou	2000 QW_{77}	Siheng S. You (born 1991) was awarded first place in the 2009 Intel International Science and Engineering Fair for his energy and transportation team project. He attends the Sunset High School, Portland, Oregon, U.S.A	JPL · 25878
25884 Asai	2000 SQ_{4}	Yoshihiko Asai (born 1957), a professor at Higashi Nippon International University.	JPL · 25884
25885 Wiesinger	2000 SD_{144}	Christoph Wiesinger (born 1989) was awarded second place in the 2009 Intel International Science and Engineering Fair for his materials and bioengineering project. He attends the HTL Braunau School, Braunau am Inn, Austria	JPL · 25885
25890 Louisburg	2000 VG_{38}	Louisburg, Kansas, home of the Powell Observatory	JPL · 25890
25892 Funabashi	2000 WP_{9}	The Japanese city of Funabashi located near Tokyo. There is good fishing offshore, and during the Edo era fish caught there were donated to the Shogun. Sports are popular in the city now, and it is the home town of several sports teams.	JPL · 25892
25893 Sugihara	2000 WR_{9}	Chiune Sugihara, Japanese diplomat in Lithuania, who defied orders and assisted asylum-seekers fleeing Nazi persecution in Europe during World War II †	MPC · 25893
25898 Alpoge	2000 YJ_{41}	Levent Alpöge (born 1992) is a finalist in the 2010 Intel Science Talent Search (STS), a science competition for high school seniors, for his computer science project. He attends the Half Hollow Hills High School West, Dix Hills, New York	JPL · 25898
25899 Namratanand	2000 YE_{61}	Namrata Anand (born 1992) is a finalist in the 2010 Intel Science Talent Search (STS), a science competition for high school seniors, for her physics project. She attends the Harker School, San Jose, California	JPL · 25899

== 25901–26000 ==
back to top

Named minor planet	Provisional	This minor planet was named for...	Ref; Catalog
25901 Ericbrooks	2000 YX_{99}	Eric David Brooks (born 1993) is a finalist in the 2010 Intel Science Talent Search (STS), a science competition for high school seniors, for his bioinformatics and genomics project. He attends the George W. Hewlett High School, Hewlett, New York	JPL · 25901
25903 Yuvalcalev	2000 YC_{116}	Yuval Yaacov Calev (born 1992) is a finalist in the 2010 Intel Science Talent Search (STS), a science competition for high school seniors, for his behavioral and social sciences project. He attends the Ward Melville High School, East Setauket, New York	JPL · 25903
25905 Clerico	2000 YO_{134}	Domenico Clerico (1950–2017), from the Langhe region of Piemonte, was a world-famous Italian winemaker. Name suggested by E. Bowell, A. W. Harris (JPL) and V. Zappalà.	JPL · 25905
25906 Morrell	2000 YV_{139}	Nidia I. Morrell (born 1953) is an astronomer at Las Campanas Observatory known for her work on O-type and Wolf-Rayet stars as well as massive binaries. As a member of the Carnegie Supernova Project, she also studies the spectacular explosions these stars make at the end of their lives.	JPL · 25906
25907 Capodilupo	2001 AR_{20}	John Vincenzo Capodilupo (born 1991) is a finalist in the 2010 Intel Science Talent Search (STS), a science competition for high school seniors, for his physics project. He attends the Catholic Central High School, Grand Rapids, Michigan	JPL · 25907
25912 Recawkwell	2001 CP_{9}	Rachel Elizabeth Cawkwell (born 1992) is a finalist in the 2010 Intel Science Talent Search (STS), a science competition for high school seniors, for her medicine and health sciences project. She attends the Byram Hills High School, Armonk, New York	JPL · 25912
25913 Jamesgreen	2001 CB_{29}	James L. Green (born 1951) is an American space physicist who has published widely on the Earth's and Jupiter's magnetospheres, as well as data systems and networks. As director of NASA's Planetary Science Division, he has overseen missions that explored Pluto, Mercury, Jupiter, Mars, the Moon and asteroids.	JPL · 25913
25914 Bair	2001 CC_{30}	Allison Bair (born 1977) works at Lowell Observatory as a research assistant performing studies of the chemical composition and physical properties of comets.	JPL · 25914
25915 Charlesmcguire	2001 CF_{30}	Charles J. McGuire (born 1932) is a retired aerospace engineer from the Mercury, Gemini and Apollo era, and is the grandfather of planetary scientist Elisabeth R. Adams.	JPL · 25915
25919 Comuniello	2001 DV_{15}	Michael John Comuniello (born 1992) is a finalist in the 2010 Intel Science Talent Search (STS), a science competition for high school seniors, for his behavioral and social sciences project. He attends the Division Avenue High School, Levittown, New York	JPL · 25919
25920 Templeanne	2001 DT_{18}	Temple Anne Douglas (born 1991) is a finalist in the 2010 Intel Science Talent Search (STS), a science competition for high school seniors, for her medicine and health sciences project. She attends the Thomas Jefferson High School for Science & Technology, Alexandria, Virginia	JPL · 25920
25924 Douglasadams	2001 DA_{42}	Douglas Adams, 20th-century British author; the provisional designation for this asteroid references the year of his death, his initials, and the Answer to the Ultimate Question of Life, the Universe, and Everything (42), as given in his novel serial The Hitchhiker's Guide to the Galaxy	JPL · 25924
25925 Jamesfenska	2001 DW_{48}	James Evan Fenska (born 1992) is a finalist in the 2010 Intel Science Talent Search (STS), a science competition for high school seniors, for his microbiology project. He attends the Miami High School, Miami, Oklahoma	JPL · 25925
25927 Jagandelman	2001 DE_{51}	Jason A. Gandelman (born 1992) is a finalist in the 2010 Intel Science Talent Search (STS), a science competition for high school seniors, for his biochemistry project. He attends the Staples High School, Westport, Connecticut	JPL · 25927
25930 Spielberg	2001 DJ_{54}	Steven Spielberg (born 1946), an American film director	MPC · 25930
25931 Peterhu	2001 DJ_{70}	Peter Danming Hu (born 1991) is a finalist in the 2010 Intel Science Talent Search (STS), a science competition for high school seniors, for his materials science project. He attends the Texas Academy of Mathematics & Science, Denton, Texas	JPL · 25931
25933 Ruoyijiang	2001 DM_{73}	Ruoyi Jiang (born 1992) is a finalist in the 2010 Intel Science Talent Search (STS), a science competition for high school seniors, for his biochemistry project. He attends the Ward Melville High School, East Setauket, New York	JPL · 25933
25937 Malysz	2001 DY_{92}	Adam Małysz (born 1977) is a Polish ski jumper who won several medals at the Winter Olympic Games in 2002 and 2010. He is also a four-time winner of the World Ski Championship and the World Cup.	IAU · 25937
25938 Stoch	2001 DC_{102}	Kamil Stoch (born 1987), is a Polish ski jumper, who won three gold medals at the Winter Olympic Games in 2014 and 2018, and who won the Four Hills Tournament (Vierschanzentournee) several times as well as the World Ski Championship in 2013, 2017 and 2019.	IAU · 25938
25940 Mikeschottland	2001 ET_{5}	Michael R. Schottland (1889–1962), was an American industrialist and founder of the Virginia Mirror Company. As a philanthropist and amateur astronomer, he donated the original astrograph for the LONEOS telescope, with which a large number of minor planets were discovered.	JPL · 25940
25941 Susanahearn	2001 EB_{9}	Susan Ahearn (born 1949) first visited Lowell Observatory as a child, with her family, on vacation. She became enthralled with the dark night skies of Arizona at that time and has supported astronomy research and education with her husband, Bill, for twenty-six years.	JPL · 25941
25942 Walborn	2001 EH_{9}	Nolan R. Walborn (born 1945) is a stellar spectroscopist specializing in the optical and ultraviolet morphology of hot, massive stars, such as O and B, Wolf-Rayet, and Luminous Blue Variables. His studies have included star forming regions in the Milky Way and the Magellanic Clouds.	JPL · 25942
25943 Billahearn	2001 EL_{10}	William "Bill" Ahearn (born 1946) first visited Lowell Observatory as a teenager. He has been a supporter of astronomy and astronomy education ever since. He and his wife, Susan, have supported Lowell Observatory's research and education for twenty-six years.	JPL · 25943
25944 Charlesross	2001 EP_{10}	Charles "Charlie" Ross (born 1934) is a long-time admirer of astronomy and STEM education at Lowell Observatory. He and his wife, Pam, have been engaged with the observatory for over 25 years.	JPL · 25944
25945 Moreadalleore	2001 EQ_{10}	Cristina Morea Dalle Ore (born 1958) is an Italian-American astronomer, who has published papers on stellar atmospheres and planetary science. As a team associate on NASA's New Horizons mission to Pluto and the Kuiper Belt, she developed complex techniques for the spectral analysis of planetary surfaces.	JPL · 25945
25951 Pamross	2001 EZ_{21}	Pam Ross (born 1949) is a long time supporter of Lowell Observatory. She has served on the Lowell Observatory Advisory Board for over 25 years.	JPL · 25951
25953 Lanairlett	2001 FM_{5}	Lanair Amaad Lett (born 1991) is a finalist in the 2010 Intel Science Talent Search (STS), a science competition for high school seniors, for his medicine and health sciences project. He attends the North Carolina School of Science & Mathematics, Durham, North Carolina	JPL · 25953
25954 Trantow	2001 FM_{13}	Donald "Don" Trantow (born 1942) is a long-time supporter of Lowell Observatory, currently serving on the Lowell Advisory Board. He operates a private observatory on Bainbridge Island, Washington. Don shares his love of astronomy with friends, neighbors, school groups and amateur astronomy clubs.	JPL · 25954
25955 Radway	2001 FX_{14}	John Radway (born 1936) is a long-time supporter of Lowell Observatory, currently serving on the advisory board and the Lowell Observatory Foundation Board. In retirement, John has focused on learning about astronomy and physics. He writes and distributes philosophical essays about the cosmos.	JPL · 25955
25956 Spanierbeckage	2001 FE_{16}	Bridget Spanier-Beckage (born 1950) is a long-time supporter of Lowell Observatory. As a former teacher, Bridget encourages Lowell's STEM education programs for children.	JPL · 25956
25957 Davidconnell	2001 FO_{16}	W. David Connell (born 1954) is an avid supporter of dark skies in Northern Arizona. He is a long-time member of the Lowell Observatory Advisory Board. In 2014, he assisted in the creation of the Lowell Observatory Foundation and has served as chair of the Foundation board since its founding.	JPL · 25957
25958 Battams	2001 FF_{18}	Karl Battams (born 1979) is an astrophysicist and computational scientist at the U.S. Naval Research Laboratory in Washington, D.C. He has been in charge of the Sungrazer Project since 2003, overseeing most of the project's 3400+ sungrazing comet discoveries, and has contributed to the study of numerous near-Sun comets.	JPL · 25958
25959 Gingergiovale	2001 FZ_{18}	Virginia "Ginger" Gore Giovale (born 1943) is a long-time supporter of math and science education. She and her husband, John, have been engaged with astronomy research and education since 1988. She serves as a trustee of the Lowell Observatory Foundation.	JPL · 25959
25960 Timheckman	2001 FQ_{20}	Timothy Martin Heckman (born 1951), an astrophysicist at Johns Hopkins University, is a highly cited researcher who has concentrated on the evolution of galaxies and supermassive black holes. A multi-wavelength observer, he was involved in development of the Sloan Digital Sky Survey and the Galaxy Evolution Explorer.	JPL · 25960
25961 Conti	2001 FL_{22}	Peter S. Conti (born 1934) is an astronomer known for his studies of hot luminous stars and the evolutionary connection between them. Specifically, he has studied O-type, Wolf-Rayet and Luminous Blue Variables.	JPL · 25961
25962 Yifanli	2001 FF_{26}	Yifan Li (born 1991) is a finalist in the 2010 Intel Science Talent Search (STS), a science competition for high school seniors, for his medicine and health sciences project. He attends the Montgomery Blair High School, Silver Spring, Maryland	JPL · 25962
25963 Elisalin	2001 FP_{26}	Elisa Bisi Lin (born 1992) is a finalist in the 2010 Intel Science Talent Search (STS), a science competition for high school seniors, for her environmental science project. She attends the Plano West Senior High School, Plano, Texas	JPL · 25963
25964 Liudavid	2001 FY_{26}	David Chienyun Liu (born 1992) is a finalist in the 2010 Intel Science Talent Search (STS), a science competition for high school seniors, for his computer science project. He attends the Lynbrook High School, San Jose, California	JPL · 25964
25965 Masihdas	2001 FB_{27}	Paul Masih Das (born 1992) is a finalist in the 2010 Intel Science Talent Search (STS), a science competition for high school seniors, for his chemistry project. He attends the Lawrence High School, Cedarhurst, New York	JPL · 25965
25966 Akhilmathew	2001 FP_{28}	Akhil Mathew (born 1992) is a finalist in the 2010 Intel Science Talent Search (STS), a science competition for high school seniors, for his mathematical sciences project. He attends the Madison High School, Madison, New Jersey	JPL · 25966
25970 Nelakanti	2001 FD_{35}	Raman Venkat Nelakanti (born 1992) is a finalist in the 2010 Intel Science Talent Search (STS), a science competition for high school seniors, for his plant sciences project. He attends the Lynbrook High School, San Jose, California	JPL · 25970
25972 Pfefferjosh	2001 FV_{35}	Joshua William Pfeffer (born 1992) is a finalist in the 2010 Intel Science Talent Search (STS), a science competition for high school seniors, for his mathematical sciences project. He attends the North Shore Hebrew Academy High School, Great Neck, New York	JPL · 25972
25973 Puranik	2001 FP_{38}	Arjun Ranganath Puranik (born 1992) is a finalist in the 2010 Intel Science Talent Search (STS), a science competition for high school seniors, for his mathematical sciences project. He attends the William Fremd High School, Palatine, Illinois	JPL · 25973
25978 Katerudolph	2001 FS_{48}	Katherine Rebecca Rudolph (born 1991) is a finalist in the 2010 Intel Science Talent Search (STS), a science competition for high school seniors, for her mathematical sciences project. She attends the Naperville Central High School, Naperville, Illinois	JPL · 25978
25979 Alansage	2001 FC_{49}	Alan Robert Sage (born 1992) is a finalist in the 2010 Intel Science Talent Search (STS), a science competition for high school seniors, for his plant sciences project. He attends the Stuyvesant High School, New York, New York	JPL · 25979
25981 Shahmirian	2001 FT_{53}	Sarine Gayaneh Shahmirian (born 1992) is a finalist in the 2010 Intel Science Talent Search (STS), a science competition for high school seniors, for her chemistry project. She attends the Chaminade College Preparatory, West Hills, California	JPL · 25981
25986 Sunanda	2001 FW_{65}	Sunanda Sharma (born 1992) is a finalist in the 2010 Intel Science Talent Search (STS), a science competition for high school seniors, for her behavioral and social sciences project. She attends the Shrewsbury High School, Shrewsbury, Massachusetts	JPL · 25986
25987 Katherynshi	2001 FJ_{66}	Katheryn Cheng Shi (born 1993) is a finalist in the 2010 Intel Science Talent Search (STS), a science competition for high school seniors, for her chemistry project. She attends the Texas Academy of Mathematics & Science, Denton, Texas	JPL · 25987
25988 Janesuh	2001 FA_{67}	Jane Yoonhae Suh (born 1991) is a finalist in the 2010 Intel Science Talent Search (STS), a science competition for high school seniors, for her medicine and health sciences project. She attends the Palos Verdes Peninsula High School, Rolling Hills Estates, California	JPL · 25988
25992 Benjamensun	2001 FT_{78}	Benjamen Chang Sun (born 1992) is a finalist in the 2010 Intel Science Talent Search (STS), a science competition for high school seniors, for his environmental science project. He attends the Red River High School, Grand Forks, North Dakota	JPL · 25992
25993 Kevinxu	2001 FJ_{80}	Kevin Young Xu (born 1992) is a finalist in the 2010 Intel Science Talent Search (STS), a science competition for high school seniors, for his behavioral and social sciences project. He attends the Roslyn High School, Roslyn Heights, New York	JPL · 25993
25994 Lynnelleye	2001 FK_{80}	Lynnelle Lin Ye (born 1992) is a finalist in the 2010 Intel Science Talent Search (STS), a science competition for high school seniors, for her mathematical sciences project. She attends the Palo Alto Senior High School, Palo Alto, California	JPL · 25994

back to top

Preceded by 24,001–25,000	Meanings of minor-planet names List of minor planets: 25,001–26,000	Succeeded by 26,001–27,000
