= Divya Nag =

American biomedical entrepreneur

- Born: c. 1991 (age 34–35); California
- Education: Stanford University
- Known for: With Profs. R.C. Robbins and J.C. Wu, and Andrew Lee, co-founded Stem Cell Theranostics; With Andrew Lee, co-founded Stanford's StartX Med incubator.
- Awards: Fortune 40 under 40, Silicon Valley Top 100 Innovators and Disruptors, 25 Coolest Women in Silicon Valley, Business Insider Most Powerful Millennials under 35
- Scientific career
- Fields: Biotechnology, biology, cardiology
- Workplaces: Apple

Divya Nag (born c. 1991) is an American biotechnology entrepreneur and biologist with a cardiology emphasis that has, since 2014, been employed by Apple Health, as of 2016 involved as a team lead in Special Projects.

While a Stanford undergraduate, Nag, working with Stanford Medicine faculty members in cardiology (and a more senior trainee), helped found Stem Cell Theranostics, a company whose aim was to develop patient-specific stem cells for use as a drug discovery platform. While at Stanford, Nag was also a co-founder, with Andrew Lee, of Stanford's StartX Med, the healthcare-focused unit of its accelerator.

At Apple, as of 2016, Nag was leading the team that design such tools as the open-source developer toolbox, ResearchKit, and Apple's patient alert and communication tool, CareKit, products that ease communication between healthcare researchers, professionals, and patients.

== Early life and education ==
Nag was born in 1991 in California, and grew up in El Dorado County. Her parents immigrated to the United States from Jaipur, India, before she was born. Nag's father, Harish Nag, is a software program manager at Intel Folsom; in interview, Nag has stated, "My dad always taught me, 'If you’re the smartest person in the room, leave.'"

Nag attended Rolling Hills Middle School where she was the student body president. At age 13, Nag then became the youngest student ever to enter Folsom Lake College. She then pursued high school at Mira Loma High School in Sacramento, where she could participate in the International Baccalaureate Program.

During her time at Mira Loma, Nag had a desire to work alongside scientists, so she contacted many at the University of California, Davis, and was offered an internship by one, Alexandra Navrotsky, with whom she "researched how microscopic particles... could help stop forest fires...", Nag stating, "We found if we could increase the quartz concentration in the soil, it can absorb a lot more heat and you require a much higher temperature for the fire to begin", a practical result that Nag told her interviewer was being applied in fire management.

=== At Stanford ===
Nag was accepted to Stanford University in 2009 to pursue an undergraduate degree in bioengineering and medical anthropology. She began research in the lab of Joseph C. Wu, studying stem cells, their induction, and their potential use in transplantation. She also explored various aspects of cardiovascular disease. Nag began to work alongside Wu and Stanford professor Robert Robbins and Wu laboratory MD-PhD trainee in Chemical Systems Biology, Andrew Lee, to create a drug testing platform where rapid assessment of drug candidate safety and efficacy could be performed on stem cell-derived human heart tissue, with the aim of expediting drug discovery. With the more senior Robbins, Wu, and Lee, Nag participated in the launch of the company Stem Cell Theranostics (various sources state 2011-2013 founding dates), to begin commercializing the Wu and Robbins technologies.

One year later, Nag co-founded StartX Med with Andrew Lee, a spin-off of the accelerator program StartX at Stanford in order to help students like herself begin the process of biotechnology innovation and healthcare entrepreneurship.

By 2012, Nag was heavily involved in both Stem Cell Theranostics and StartX Med so she decided to discontinue her studies at Stanford, at the age of 20.

== Career ==
=== Stem Cell Theranostics ===
While a Stanford undergraduate, Nag, working with physician scientists Robert C. Robbins and Joseph C. Wu, and Stanford MD-PhD trainee Andrew Lee, helped found Stem Cell Theranostics, a company whose aim has been to develop patient-specific stem cells for use in a drug discovery platform; dates of founding vary between 2011 and 2013. Stem Cell Theranostics is a biotechnology company that pioneered the use of skin cell-derived stem cells to use in drug discovery platforms. Specifically, they would take skin cells and convert them to stem cells and then re-differentiate them into heart cells through the addition of transcription factors. Since the heart cells, now being grown in a dish, are derived from a patient, they contain genetic profile and thus drugs can be tested in a patient specific manner. The motivation behind the company lies in the fact that most drugs do not make it to the final stages of clinical trials due to cardiovascular effects and further, most drugs that are recalled after passing the final stages, are recalled due to negative effects on the cardiovascular system. The company wanted a cheap and fast way to test the effects of a drug on human cells, instead of in mice, so speed up the drug discovery process and bring harmless and specific treatments to patients as quickly as possible. As Nagy states in a YouTube video that was accessed for her Fierce Biotech "Top Women in Medical Devices 2014" accolade, "We've tested every single drug that has been pulled from market due to cardiotoxicity and have shown with 100% accuracy that we could have spotted it on day one of its conception."

The Stem Cell Theranostics website became inactive some time after April 2016, and as of December 2025, the "clinical trial in a dish" was being offered by the distinct Joseph C. Wu-led company, Greenstone Biosciences.

=== StartX Med ===
Nag and Wu laboratory colleague Andrew Lee co-founded StartX Med at Stanford University in 2012. StartX Med is the part of the Stanford StartX organization that supports students in their path towards innovating and developing startups through Stanford, specifically in the healthcare and medical areas. She was inspired by her own experiences starting Stem Cell Theranostics as she saw added hurdles in starting a healthcare startup compared to the typical technology startup that StartX supported. She wanted to help students navigate their way through finding laboratories and FDA approval as she had to for her company as well as create a collaborative environment for students interested in starting companies in the healthcare sector. StartX Med has now helped over 500 health technology companies, raised over $1 billion in aggregate, and partnered with top 10 pharmaceutical companies to bring ideas into practice.

=== Apple, Inc. ===
In 2014, Nag was recruited to work at Apple in their Special Projects unit, to "innovate novel ways to make healthcare data easily usable by both patients and researchers". There, as of 2016, she led the team that created ResearchKit, a developer toolbox (open-source) that functions alongside Apple’s health data storage and sharing tool, HealthKit, such that researchers and physicians can create iPhone apps to gather data for medical research, rather than relying on physical access by patients to research facilities. Applications as of 2016 included work on autism, concussion, diabetes, and Parkinson’s disease. Nag's work has extended to Apple's patient alert and communication tool, CareKit, to "brin[g]... data-sharing... to the patient-physician relationship". CareKit tools allow automatic alerts from doctors to patients (regarding medications, exercise, etc.), and provides a communication path from a patient to doctors to "continual[ly] update... their condition".

== Awards and recognition ==
- 2018 Time magazine Healthcare 50 List
- 2017 Fortune 40 under 40
- 2016 The Most Creative People In Business 2016, by Fast Company
- 2016 Silicon Valley Top 100, by Business Insider, no. 72.
- 2016 25 Coolest Women in Silicon Valley, by Business Insider.
- 2014 30-Under-30 Who Are Changing The World, by Forbes.com, in the Science & Healthcare category.
- 2014 Business Insider Most Powerful Millennials under 35
- 2011 American Heart Association Undergraduate Fellowship
- Stanford University Thought Leader

== Select publications ==
=== From the Apple Heart Study (Stanford, Apple, etc.) ===
Stanford's Marco V. Perez and Mintu P. Turakhia communicating:

- Perez, MV; Mahaffey, KW; Hedlin, H; Rumsfeld, JS; Garcia, A; Ferris, T; Balasubramanian, V; Russo, AM; Rajmane, A; Cheung, L; Hung, G; Lee, J.; Kowey, P; Talati, N; Nag, D; Gummidipundi, SE; Beatty, A; Hills, MT; Desai, S; Granger, CB; Desai, M; Turakhia, MP; Apple Heart Study Investigators [73 further authors] (November 14, 2019). "Large-Scale Assessment of a Smartwatch to Identify Atrial Fibrillation". New England Journal of Medicine. 381 (20): 1909–1917. doi:10.1056/NEJMoa1901183. ISSN 0028-4793. PMC 8112605. PMID 31722151.
- Turakhia, MP; Desai, M; Hedlin, H; Rajmane, A; Talati, N; Ferris, T; Desai, S; Nag, D; Patel, M; Kowey, P; Rumsfeld, J; Russo, AM; Hills, MT; Granger, CB; Mahaffey, KW & Perez, MV (September 1, 2018). "Rationale and design of a large-scale, app-based study to identify cardiac arrhythmias using a smartwatch: The Apple Heart Study". American Heart Journal. 207: 66–75. doi:10.1016/j.ahj.2018.09.002. PMC 8099048. PMID 30392584.

=== From Stanford ===
Stanford's Joseph C. Wu or Patricia K. Nguyen communicating:

- Nguyen, PK; Nag, D & Wu, JC (2012). "Molecular Imaging of Cardiovascular Disease". In Patterson, Cam & Willis, Monte S. (ed.). Translational Cardiology: Molecular Basis of Cardiac Metabolism, Cardiac Remodeling, Translational Therapies and Imaging Techniques (review). London, England: Springer Nature. pp. 485–531. doi:10.1007/978-1-61779-891-7_14. ISBN 9781617798917.
- Nguyen, PK; Nag, D & Wu, JC (February 2011) [7 December 2010]. "Sex Differences in the Diagnostic Evaluation of Coronary Artery Disease" (review). Journal of Nuclear Cardiology. 18 (1): 144–152. doi:10.1007/s12350-010-9315-2. ISSN 1532-6551. PMC 3657505. PMID 21136229.
- Nguyen, PK; Nag, D & Wu, JC (September 30, 2010). "Methods to Assess Stem Cell Lineage, Fate and Function" (review). Advanced Drug Delivery Reviews. 62 (12): 1175–86. doi:10.1016/j.addr.2010.08.008. PMC 3078641. PMID 20816906.
