= Suresh Garimella =

Indian-American mechanical engineer

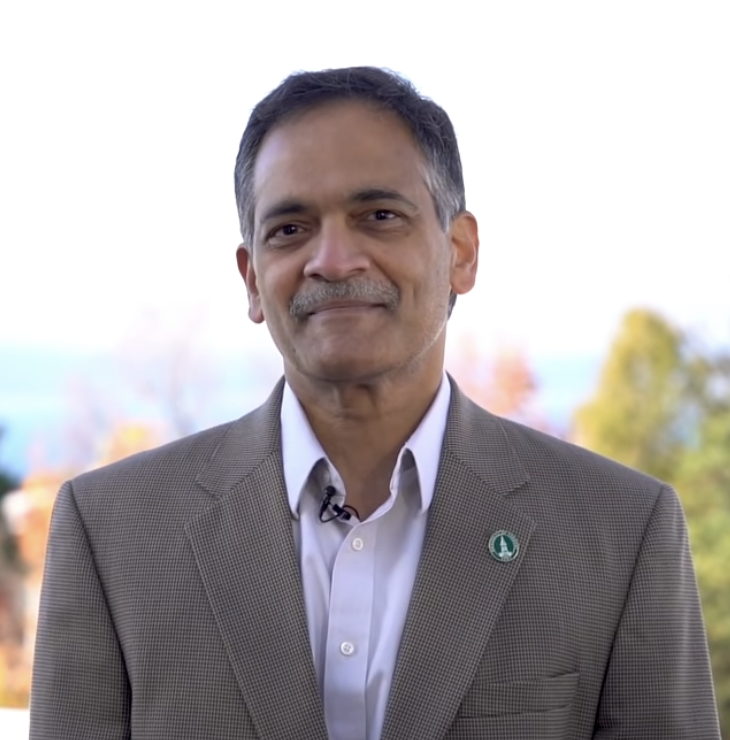
- Garimella in 2021

23rd President of the University of Arizona
- Incumbent
- Assumed office October 1, 2024
- Preceded by: Robert C. Robbins

27th President of the University of Vermont
- In office July 1, 2019 – July 2024
- Preceded by: Tom Sullivan
- Succeeded by: Patricia Prelock (interim)

Personal details
- Born: 1964 or 1965 Nedunuru, India
- Education: IIT Madras (BS); Ohio State University (MS); University of California, Berkeley (PhD)
- Scientific career
- Fields: Mechanical engineering
- Institutions: Purdue University; University of Vermont; University of Arizona
- Thesis: An investigation of the thermal and hydrodynamic characteristics of an array of protruding elements in single phase forced convection (1989)
- Doctoral advisor: Pamela A. Eibeck

Suresh Garimella (/sˈɛhɛʃ/) is an American mechanical engineer and university administrator serving as the 23rd president of University of Arizona since 2024. Previously, Garimella was the 27th president of the University of Vermont. Before assuming the presidency in 2019, Garimella was executive vice president for research and partnerships at Purdue University.

== Early life and education ==
Garimella was born in Nedunuru, Andhra Pradesh, India. His parents did not have a college education.

In 1985, he earned his B.S. in mechanical engineering from IIT Madras. He then received an M.S. from Ohio State University in 1986, followed by a PhD from University of California, Berkeley in 1989, both in mechanical engineering.

== Career ==
=== Purdue University ===
At Purdue University, Garimella was executive vice president for research and partnerships and the Goodson Distinguished Professor of Mechanical Engineering. He also served as Purdue’s chief global affairs officer. He was the founding director of the Cooling Technologies Research Center.

In 2018, Garimella was appointed as a member of the National Science Board by the Trump administration. He was named a Jefferson Science Fellow by the United States Department of State in 2010 in the Obama administration. He has also was a Science Advisor in the International Energy Agency.

=== University of Vermont ===
Garimella became the president of the University of Vermont on July 1, 2019.

He had received criticism for the university's plan to terminate select humanities programs which led to the creation of UVM United Against the Cuts, where over 3,000 people voiced their lack of confidence. His administration had faced pushback for its response to a Department of Education investigation into antisemitism on campus, and over the cancellation of a planned guest lecture by Palestinian author Mohammed El-Kurd.

=== University of Arizona ===
On August 9, 2024, Dr. Garimella accepted the position of President of the University of Arizona. He assumed office on October 1, 2024. In April 2025, Garimella garnered national attention after implementing sweeping changes to the university’s diversity, equity, and inclusion (DEI) initiatives, including removing several administrative DEI roles and eliminating references to DEI from institutional policy documents. The move was met with criticism from civil rights groups, student organizations, and faculty, who characterized the actions as politically motivated and aligned with broader national efforts to restrict DEI programming in public education.

== Awards and honors ==
In 2025, Garimella was elected to the National Academy of Engineering.

Academic offices
Preceded by Tom Sullivan	27th President of the University of Vermont; 2019–2024	Succeeded by Patricia Prelock (interim)
Preceded by Robert C. Robbins	23rd President of the University of Arizona; 2024–present	Incumbent
