= Madupalli =

Coordinates: 18°32′N 79°28′E

- village
- Interactive map of Madupalli
- Country: India
- State: Telangana

Population
  - Total: 7,000

Languages
  - Official: Telugu
- Time zone: UTC+5:30 (IST)
- Vehicle registration: TS
- Nearest city: Madhira
- Website: telangana.gov.in

Madupalli is a village in the Ainavilli Mandal and East godavari district in Andhrapradesh.
