= Krapa =

Krapa may refer to:

- Krapa, a village in Kollur mandal, Guntur District, Andhra Pradesh, India
- Krapa, India, a village in East Godavari district, Mummidivaram, Andhra Pradesh, India
- Krapa, Republic of Macedonia
- Krapa, a Ghanaian Adinkra symbol
