= Patricia Prelock =

American speech pathologist and academic administrator

- Prelock in 2020

Provost at the University of Arizona
- Incumbent
- Assumed office May 2025
- Preceded by: Ronald W. Marx

President of the University of Vermont
- Interim
- In office August 2024 – April 2025
- Preceded by: Suresh Garimella
- Succeeded by: Marlene Tromp

Personal details
- Born: Patricia Ann Prelock Ohio, U.S.
- Education: Kent State University (BS, MS); University of Pittsburgh (PhD)

Patricia Ann Prelock is an American speech pathologist and academic administrator who has served as the Senior Vice President for Academic Affairs and Provost at the University of Arizona since May 19, 2025. She succeeded Ronald W. Marx, who had served as interim provost.

She previously served as provost and then interim president of the University of Vermont. In 2013, Prelock served as president of the American Speech–Language–Hearing Association.

== Life ==
Prelock was born and raised in a small town near Youngstown, Ohio. Her parents did not have the opportunity for higher education due to financial constraints. Her father, initially a mechanic, eventually became a business owner, with the family involved in running the company. Prelock was inspired to pursue a career in speech pathology after her younger brother, James, was born with Down syndrome. This experience led her to focus on communication and support for individuals with disabilities, particularly those with autism. Two of her six siblings lived into adulthood.

Prelock graduated magna cum laude from Kent State University in 1976 with a B.S. in speech pathology and audiology, followed by a M.S. from the same institution in 1977. In 1983, she earned her Ph.D. in speech-language pathology from the University of Pittsburgh School of Health and Rehabilitation Sciences. Her dissertation was titled, Cumulative Effects of Syntactic and Phonological Complexity on Children's Language Production. Richard Schwartz was her doctoral advisor. During Prelock's studies, she worked on a National Institutes of Health (NIH) fellowship and balanced her academic responsibilities with raising her young son, incorporating him into her research on cognition and communication.

In 1994, Prelock began working for the center on disability and community inclusion at the University of Vermont (UVM). She secured a federal grant to develop a virtual clinic for supporting individuals with disabilities in rural areas and served as training director on the project. Following the end of her first marriage, Prelock later married Bill Congleton, a general and family practice attorney, and has continued her work in the field, contributing to disability support and education in Vermont. Her research focuses on neurodiversity and developing strategies to support autistic individuals. Prelock served as the dean of the college of nursing and health sciences and as interim provost. In 2013, she was the president of the American Speech–Language–Hearing Association. In 2019, she became the UVM provost and senior vice president. Prelock became the interim president of UVM, succeeding Suresh Garimella in October 2024.

In April 2025, Prelock was named the Senior Vice President for Academic Affairs and Provost at the University of Arizona, with her appointment beginning on May 19, 2025. She succeeded Ronald W. Marx, who had been serving as interim provost. Prelock was selected after a national search, during which she was one of four finalists.
