= David W. Hahn =

American academic

David Hahn

8th President of Boise State University
- Incumbent
- Assumed office July 1, 2026
- Preceded by: Marlene Tromp; Jeremiah Shinn (acting)

Personal details
- Education: Louisiana State University (BS, PhD)

David W. Hahn is an American engineer and academic serving as the 8th president of Boise State University. Hahn's appointment was approved by the Idaho State Board of Education on July 1, 2026.

== Education ==
Hahn earned a Bachelor of Science and PhD in mechanical engineering from Louisiana State University.

== Career ==
Hahn began his career as an assistant professor of mechanical engineering at the University of Florida in 1998, rising to the position of chair of the Department of Mechanical and Aerospace Engineering before departing in 2019. Hahn later served as the dean of the University of Arizona College of Engineering. Hahn holds several engineering patents.
