= Marlene Tromp =

American academic administrator (born 1966)

28th President of the University of Vermont
- Incumbent
- Assumed office July 1, 2025
- Preceded by: Patricia Prelock (interim)

7th President of Boise State University
- In office July 1, 2019 – July 1, 2025
- Preceded by: Bob Kustra
- Succeeded by: Jeremiah Shinn (interim); David W. Hahn

Personal details
- Born: 1966 (age 59–60) Green River, Wyoming, U.S.
- Education: Creighton University (BA); University of Wyoming (MA); University of Florida (PhD)

Marlene Tromp (born 1966) is an American academic administrator who is the 28th President of the University of Vermont. She is the former president of Boise State University.

== Early life and education ==
Tromp grew up in Green River, Wyoming. A first-generation college student, Tromp initially aspired to become a medical doctor. Tromp received a scholarship and worked several part-time jobs to attend Creighton University. Tromp earned a Bachelor of Arts from Creighton and returned to Wyoming to attend the University of Wyoming, where she earned a Master of Arts in English. Tromp then earned a PhD in English from the University of Florida.

== Career ==
Tromp spent 14 years teaching at Denison University in Ohio, rising to be the chair and director of women’s studies and chair of the faculty. Tromp moved to Arizona State University in 2011, where she was first director of the School of Humanities, Arts, and Cultural Studies, then vice provost of ASU’s West Campus, and then dean of Arizona State University New College of Interdisciplinary Arts and Sciences. Then in 2017, Tromp served as the campus provost and executive vice chancellor at the University of California, Santa Cruz.

Tromp became the first female president of Boise State in July 2019. In that role, she faced headwinds from a conservative Idaho state legislature on issues of DEI in higher education.

In March 2025, Tromp was announced as the incoming 28th president of University of Vermont. She succeeded interim president Patricia Prelock in the summer of 2025. Meanwhile, Boise State struggled to appoint a new president.

Tromp was sworn in as President of UVM on September 30, 2025.
