= Krapa, Ainavilli =

Krapa
- Village
- Interactive map of Krapa
- Location in Andhra Pradesh, India Krapa (India)
- Coordinates: 16.640376°N 82.074414°E
- Country: India
- State: Andhra Pradesh
- District: Konaseema district

Languages
  - Official: Telugu
- Time zone: UTC+5:30 (IST)
- PIN: 533216

Krapa is a hamlet in Ainavilli mandal of Konaseema district in Andhra Pradesh State, India.
