= Ainavillilanka =

- Village
- Interactive map of Ainavillilanka
- Location in Andhra Pradesh, India Ainavillilanka (India)
- Coordinates: 16.679609°N 82.0196°E
- Country: India
- State: Andhra Pradesh
- District: Konaseema
- Mandal: Ainavilli

Languages
  - Official: Telugu
- Time zone: UTC+5:30 (IST)
- PIN: 533211

Ainavillilanka is a village situated in Ainavilli mandal, Konaseema district in Andhra Pradesh State.
