= Sanapallilanka =

- Village
- Interactive map of Sanapallilanka
- Location in Andhra Pradesh, India Sanapallilanka (India)
- Coordinates: 16.656236°N 82.053663°E
- Country: India
- State: Andhra Pradesh
- Region: Konaseema
- District: Konaseema district

Languages
  - Official: Telugu
- Time zone: UTC+5:30 (IST)
- PIN: 533211

Sanapallilanka is situated in Konaseema district in Ainavilli region, in Andhra Pradesh State, India.
