= Ainavilli =

Moolapalem, Sanapalli lanka, Ainavilli Mandal
- Village
- Interactive map of Moolapalem, Sanapalli lanka, Ainavilli Mandal
- Location in Andhra Pradesh, India Moolapalem, Sanapalli lanka, Ainavilli Mandal (India)
- Coordinates: 16.6620488°N 82.0132452°E
- Country: India
- State: Andhra Pradesh
- District: Dr. B.R. Ambedkar Konaseema
- Talukas: Ainavilli

Area
  - Total: 10.22 km^{2} (3.95 sq mi)

Population (2011)
  - Total: 8,336
  - Density: 815.7/km^{2} (2,113/sq mi)

Languages
  - Official: Telugu
- Time zone: UTC+5:30 (IST)
- PIN: 533211
- Vehicle Registration: AP05 (Former); AP39 (from 30 January 2019)

Moolapalem, Sanapalli Lanka village Ainavilli Mandal is a village in Konaseema district in the state of Andhra Pradesh in India. It is located in Ainavilli Mandal of Kothapeta revenue division of the district. Ainavillilanka is another village located nearby.
