= Nedunuru =

- village
- Interactive map of Nedunuru
- Location in Andhra Pradesh, India Nedunuru (India)
- Coordinates: 16°38′28.477″N 81°59′8.296″E
- Country: India
- State: Andhra Pradesh
- District: Konaseema

Population (2001)
  - Total: 9,285

Languages
  - Official: Telugu
- Time zone: UTC+5:30 (IST)
- PIN: 533241

Nedunuru is a village in Ainavilli mandal in Konaseema district of Andhra Pradesh, India.
