= Stem Cell Theranostics =

Biotech company

- Type: Private
- Industry: Biotechnology
- Headquarters: Menlo Park, California, United States

Stem Cell Theranostics was, as of November 2014, a privately held biotech company based in Menlo Park, California that was seeking to provide companies developing new small molecule therapeutics with a method to more accurately predict cardiotoxicity and cardiovascular drug efficacy.

The description of its founding appears variously in that period, as having been founded by Stanford School of Medicine faculty, current and former (i.e., Robert Robbins and Joseph Wu), alongside one or more biomedical trainees.

The Stem Cell Theranostics website became inactive some time after April 2016, and as of December 2025, the "clinical trial in a dish" was being offered by the Joseph C. Wu-led company, Greenstone Biosciences.

== History ==
As of 2014, Stem Cell Theranostics was applying stem cell technologies developed at the Stanford School of Medicine, by Robert Robbins, head, at that time, of the Texas Medical Center in Houston, Texas, and previously the Stanford Chair of Cardiothoracic Surgery and the Director of its Cardiovascular Institute, along with Joseph Wu, an Associate Professor of Cardiovascular Medicine and of Radiology at Stanford, and at least a quartet of postdoctoral scholars and graduate students from those faculty member's research laboratories.

The description of its founding appears set out in various ways in that period, especially in that it was founded by Robbins and Wu, former and current Stanford Medicine faculty, respectively, alongside Andrew Lee, then an MD-PhD student in Chemical Systems Biology in the Wu laboratory at Stanford; alternatively, it has been described as being founded to commercialise "stem cell research from the labs of two professors at the Stanford University School of Medicine" with "co-founders [that] include a former Stanford undergraduate, Divya Nag, and a Stanford post-doctoral student, Andrew Lee".

The company states that it is attempting to create a "clinical trial in a dish" drug screening platform, to reduces the risk associated with drug development. As of May 2014, the company was working with drug discovery and biotechnology companies to use patient-specific induced pluripotent stem cells for development of novel therapeutics.

As of April 2016, the original Stem Cell Theranostics website remained active; after that date it has no longer been archived. As of December 2025 or earlier, the "clinical trial in a dish" appeared to be maintained by a separate company of that Joseph C. Wu had co-founded, Greenstone Biosciences.
