= Robert C. Robbins =

American cardiothoracic surgeon

Robert Robbins
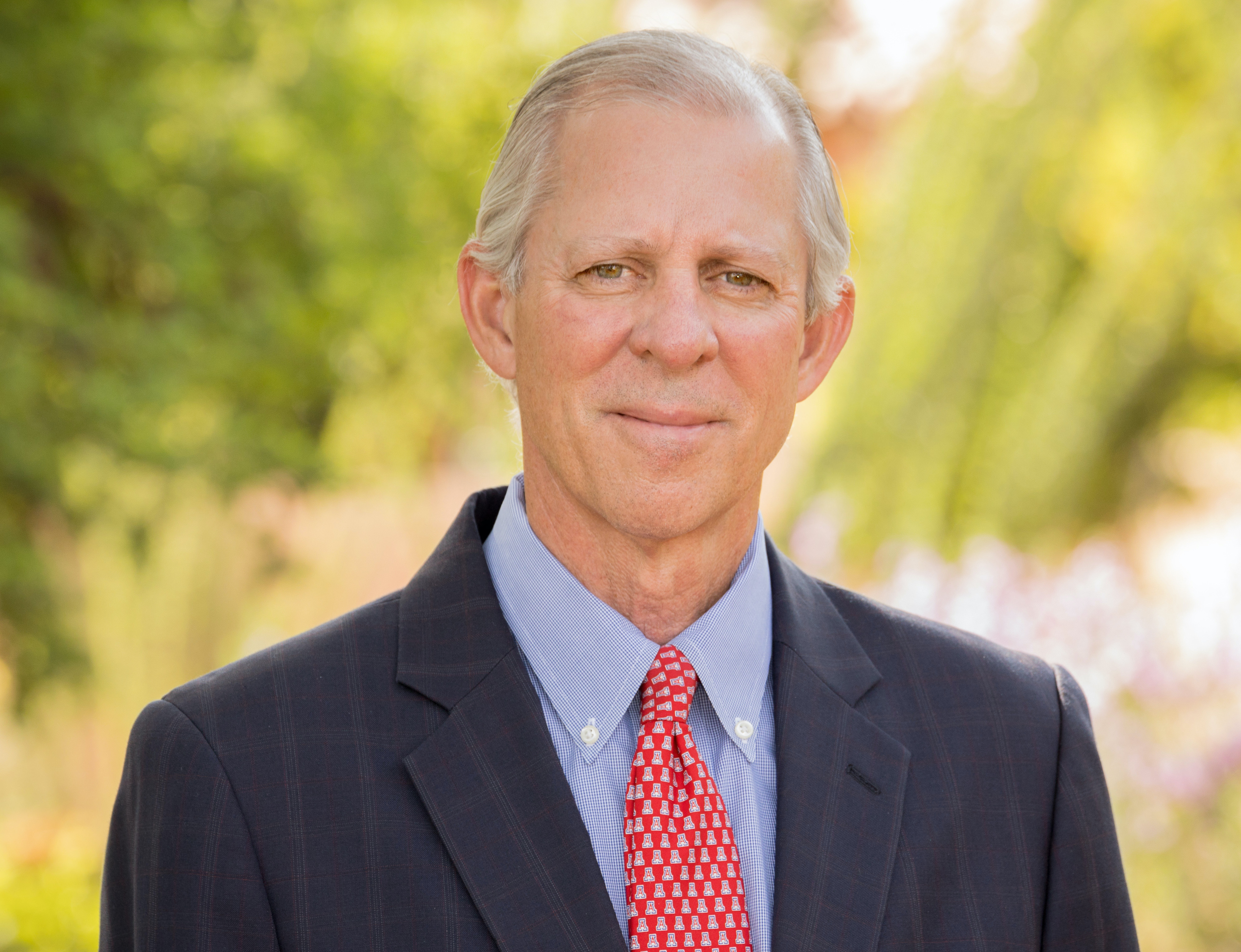
- Robbins in 2020

22nd President of the University of Arizona
- In office June 1, 2017 – October 1, 2024
- Preceded by: Ann Weaver Hart
- Succeeded by: Suresh Garimella

Personal details
- Born: Robert Clayton Robbins; November 20, 1957 (age 68) Laurel, Mississippi, U.S.
- Children: 2
- Education: Millsaps College (BS); University of Mississippi (MD)
- Medical career
- Field: Cardiothoracic surgery
- Institutions: Stanford University Medical Center; Columbia University; National Institutes of Health; Emory University; Texas Medical Center
- Sub-specialties: Heart transplantation
- Research: Stem cells for cardiac regeneration Cardiac transplant

Robert Clayton Robbins (born November 20, 1957), known professionally as Robert C. Robbins or R.C. Robbins, is an American cardiothoracic surgeon and former president of The University of Arizona. Previously, he was the president and CEO of the Texas Medical Center in Houston, Texas, from 2012 to 2017.

== Early life and education ==
Robbins was born in Laurel, Mississippi, and raised by his maternal grandparents, where he spent much of his childhood at the local community college, where his grandfather was a math professor. In high school, Robbins was inspired to pursue medicine, in part due to the lack of local physicians. He later earned his undergraduate degree in chemistry from Millsaps College. In 1983, he received his medical degree from the University of Mississippi.

== Career ==
After receiving his medical degree in 1983, he continued work as a resident at the University of Mississippi until 1989, with an emphasis in general surgery. He then began a residency at Stanford University Hospital, specializing in cardiothoracic surgery until 1992, before working as a pediatric fellow at Emory University School of Medicine and Royal Children's Hospital in Australia. Beginning in 1993, Robbins acted as the director of the cardiothoracic transplantation laboratory at the Stanford University School of Medicine until 2012, becoming the chair of the Department of Cardiothoracic Surgery in 2005. During his time at the Stanford University School of Medicine, Robbins maintained active roles in a variety of public and professional service, including serving on the education committee for the American Association for Thoracic Surgery and the strategic planning committee for the American Heart Association.

On November 5, 2012, Robbins left Stanford's school of medicine to work as the president and CEO of the Texas Medical Center, before becoming the 22nd president of the University of Arizona in 2017. In October 2019, Robbins faced criticism after remarks he made during a Native SOAR (Students Outreach, Access, and Resiliency) class. According to students present, Robbins prefaced a discussion of his ancestry by saying, "Not to pull an Elizabeth Warren," before explaining that he had taken a DNA test to determine whether he had Cherokee ancestry. Students reported that Robbins added that, despite the negative result, he intended to be tested again because of his "very high cheekbones." Native student organizations, including Voices of Indigenous Concerns in Education (VOICE), described the remarks as culturally insensitive and called for a formal apology. Robbins later met with Native student leaders and issued a public apology, stating that he regretted the impact of his comments and wanted to learn from the experience. In 2021, he was given a one-year contract extension (to 2024) and an 8% pay raise, for a total compensation estimated at $1 million per year. Amidst a financial crisis, Robbins announced his intention to step down in 2026 at the latest.

In the spring of 2023, the Faculty Senate at the University of Arizona gave R.C. Robbins a vote of “no confidence” due, in part, to the university leadership's inaction regarding a violent student who would go on to fatally shoot a professor in October 2022. He received a pay raise in October 2023 from the Arizona Board of Regents. This was followed by his decision in December 2023 to enact hiring freezes, eliminate the Salary Increase Program and Pay Structure Increase for staff and faculty and Tuition Guarantee Program for students, and restrict purchasing by university departments due to the University of Arizona's poor financial position.

On October 1, 2024, Robbins stepped down from his position as president of the University of Arizona. He was succeeded by Suresh Garimella. He is expected to continue working for the university's College of Medicine in Tucson as a tenured professor, where he may continue receiving a total compensation package of nearly $1 million and remain eligible for presidential-level bonuses through the end of his contract in 2026.

In 2025, Robbins was named a Distinguished Visiting Fellow of the Hoover Institution.

== Publications ==
Robbin's publications include more than 300 peer-reviewed journal articles, spanning a variety of research topics including the investigation of stem cells for cardiac regeneration, cardiac transplant allograft vasculopathy, bioengineered blood vessels, and automated vascular anastomotic devices.

=== Selected publications ===
- Haematopoietic stem cells adopt mature haematopoietic fates in ischaemic myocardium (2004)
- Bridge-to-transplant with the Novacor left-ventricular assist system (1999)
- Human Tissue-Engineered Blood Vessels for Adult Arterial Revascularization (2006)
- A Nonviral Minicircle Vector for Deriving Human iPS Cells (2010)
- Stem Cell Transplantation: The Lung Barrier (2007)
- Patient-Specific Induced Pluripotent Stem Cells as a Model for Familial Dilated Cardiomyopathy (2012)
