= Ainavilli mandal =

Coordinates: 16.662°N 82.0132°E

- Mandal
- Interactive map of Ainavilli mandal
- Country: India
- State: Andhra Pradesh
- District: Konaseema
- Population according to 2011 Census: 65,161
- Number of Villages: 17
- Area in Sq Km: 93.48
- Time zone: UTC+5:30 (IST)

Ainavilli mandal is one of the 22 mandals in Konaseema district of Andhra Pradesh. As per census 2011, there are 17 villages in this mandal.

== Demographics ==
Ainavilli Mandal has total population of 65,161 as per the Census 2011 out of which 32,858 are males while 32,303 are females. The average Sex Ratio of Ainavilli Mandal is 983. The total literacy rate of Ainavilli Mandal is 78%.

== Towns and villages ==
=== Villages ===
- Ainavilli
- Chintana Lanka
- K. Jagannadhapuram
- Kondukuduru
- Krapa
- Madupalle
- Magam
- Nedunuru
- Pothukurru
- Sanapalli Lanka
- Sirasavalli Savaram
- Siripalle
- Totharamudi
- Veeravallipalem
- Veluvalapalle
- Vilasa

== See also ==
- List of mandals in Andhra Pradesh
