= Meanings of minor-planet names: 120001–121000 =

As minor planet discoveries are confirmed, they are given a permanent number by the IAU's Minor Planet Center (MPC), and the discoverers can then submit names for them, following the IAU's naming conventions. The list below concerns those minor planets in the specified number-range that have received names, and explains the meanings of those names.

Official naming citations of newly named small Solar System bodies are approved and published in a bulletin by IAU's Working Group for Small Bodies Nomenclature (WGSBN). Before May 2021, citations were published in MPC's Minor Planet Circulars for many decades. Recent citations can also be found on the JPL Small-Body Database (SBDB). Until his death in 2016, German astronomer Lutz D. Schmadel compiled these citations into the Dictionary of Minor Planet Names (DMP) and regularly updated the collection.

Based on Paul Herget's The Names of the Minor Planets, Schmadel also researched the unclear origin of numerous asteroids, most of which had been named prior to World War II. This article incorporates text from this source, which is in the public domain: SBDB New namings may only be added to this list below after official publication as the preannouncement of names is condemned. The WGSBN publishes a comprehensive guideline for the naming rules of non-cometary small Solar System bodies.

== 120001–120100 ==
Named minor planet	Provisional	This minor planet was named for...	Ref · Catalog
120038 Franlainsher	2003 BR_{1}	Frances Fisher (born 1944) and Elaine Fisher (born 1946), former wife and sister-in-law of the discoverer James Whitney Young, respectively.	JPL · 120038
120040 Pagliarini	2003 BF_{5}	Silvano Pagliarini (born 1950), Italian amateur astronomer, builder of the public amateur observatory "Padre Angelo Secchi" in Castelnovo Sotto.	JPL · 120040
120074 Bass	2003 EA	Harry Bass (born 1935) graduated from the University of Pennsylvania Medical School in 1960. In 1977, he joined the Staff of Memorial Medical Center, Las Cruces, New Mexico, established a private practice, and is a highly respected physician by both his peers and his patients.	JPL · 120074
120097 Janniksinner	2003 EJ_{50}	Jannik Sinner (b. 2001), Italian tennis player. Sinner is one of the best players in the world and is the only Italian tennis player to have reached the number one position in the world ranking and to have won the Australian Open, Wimbledon, the US Open and the Finals, as well as having won the Davis Cup twice with the national team.	IAU · 120097
120098 Telmopievani	2003 EJ_{50}	Telmo Pievani (b. 1970), Italian evolutionist and philosopher of science.	IAU · 120098

== 120101–120200 ==
back to top

Named minor planet	Provisional	This minor planet was named for...	Ref · Catalog
120101 Aureladina	2003 FP_{5}	Aurel Radu (b. 1953) and Adina Radu (b. 1952), are the parents of one of the Romanian CINEOS observers, and have supported her interest in science from an early age.	IAU · 120101
120102 Lucabenetti	2003 FU_{5}	Luca Benetti, Italian power-electronics engineer.	IAU · 120102
120103 Dolero	2003 FW_{6}	Dominique Lherault (born 1945), maiden name of the wife of French amateur astronomer Bernard Christophe who discovered this minor planet	JPL · 120103
120112 Elizabethacton	2003 FS_{51}	Elizabeth A. Acton (born 1981) contributed to the OSIRIS-REx asteroid sample-return mission as Project Support Specialist.	JPL · 120112
120120 Kankelborg	2003 FM_{84}	Charles Kankelborg (born 1967), American astrophysicist	JPL · 120120
120121 Libbyadelman	2003 FO_{85}	Libby Adelman (born 1971) contributed to the NASA OSIRIS-REx asteroid sample-return mission as Instrument Manager for the OLA, OVIRS and REXIS instruments.	JPL · 120121
120131 MAVEN	2003 FX_{119}	MAVEN (launched 2013) is a NASA Mars orbiter with a primary mission to study the Mars atmosphere and its evolution.	IAU · 120131
120141 Lucaslara	2003 GO_{21}	Lucas Lara Garrido (1966–2006), Spanish astrophysicist who researched active galactic nuclei at the Instituto de Astrofísica de Andalucía	JPL · 120141
120153 Hoekenga	2003 HR_{2}	B. Christine Hoekenga (born 1981) worked on the OSIRIS-REx asteroid sample-return mission as the social media lead in the Principal Investigator's office	JPL · 120153
120174 Jeffjenny	2003 KM_{3}	Jeffrey Young (born 1966) and Jennifer Young (born 1967), son and daughter of the American astronomer James Whitney Young who discovered this minor planet	JPL · 120174
120186 Suealeman	2004 BQ_{111}	Sue Aleman (born 1957) contributed to the OSIRIS-REx asteroid sample-return mission as Chief Safety and Mission Assurance Officer.	JPL · 120186
120188 Amyaqueche	2004 CL_{12}	Amy A. Aqueche (born 1975) contributed to the OSIRIS-REx asteroid sample-return mission as the Contracting Officer (CO). Prior to OSIRIS-REx, she served as the NASA CO for MAVEN and the USACE CO in support of Ft. Stewart and Hunter Army Air Field Operations in Savannah, Georgia.	JPL · 120188
120191 Tombagg	2004 CG_{100}	Thomas C. Bagg III (born 1952) is the Risk Manager for the OSIRIS-REx asteroid sample-return mission. Prior to this role, he supported the GSFC SBIR program, the HST SM4, NOAA-N and NOAA-N Prime missions. He helped develop the GSFC Systems Engineering Education Development Program	JPL · 120191
120196 Kevinballou	2004 DR_{21}	Kevin M. Ballou (born 1969), an engineer at the NASA Goddard Space Flight Center, contributed to the OSIRIS-REx asteroid sample-return mission as C&DH Electrical Systems Engineer.	JPL · 120196

== 120201–120300 ==
back to top

Named minor planet	Provisional	This minor planet was named for...	Ref · Catalog
120208 Brentbarbee	2004 EK_{32}	Brent Barbee (born 1981), a member of the Flight Dynamics System team for the OSIRIS-REx asteroid sample-return mission.	JPL · 120208
120214 Danteberdeguez	2004 EG_{78}	Dante Berdeguez (born 1976) is a Spacecraft Systems Engineer at NASA's Goddard Spaceflight Center. He specializes in both spacecraft and ground system integration and testing. He contributed to the OSIRIS-REx asteroid sample-return mission as Ground Systems Readiness Test Engineer.	JPL · 120214
120215 Kevinberry	2004 EM_{79}	Kevin E. Berry (born 1980) contributed to the OSIRIS-REx asteroid sample-return mission as the FDS TAG Mission Phase Lead and is a member of the Navigation and Mission Design Branch at NASA Goddard Space Flight Center. He was also part of the flight dynamics teams for SDO, LCROSS and MAVEN.	JPL · 120215
120218 Richardberry	2004 FN_{2}	Richard P. Berry Jr. (born 1955) contributed to the OSIRIS-REx asteroid sample-return mission as Configuration Control Manager.	JPL · 120218
120285 Brentbos	2004 HE_{47}	Brent J. Bos (born 1969), the OSIRIS-REx asteroid sample-return mission TAGCAMS instrument scientist.	JPL · 120285
120299 Billlynch	2004 JL_{28}	Bill Lynch (born 1962) has worked tirelessly for many years assisting amateur and professional astronomers with their CCD cameras and related equipment	JPL · 120299

== 120301–120400 ==
back to top

Named minor planet	Provisional	This minor planet was named for...	Ref · Catalog
120308 Deebradel	2004 KN_{12}	Deanna Bradel (born 1964), a Financial Manager for the OSIRIS-REx asteroid sample-return mission.	JPL · 120308
120324 Falusandrás	2004 MV_{3}	András Falus (born 1947) is a Hungarian immunologist, full professor of the Semmelweis University, and member of the Hungarian Academy of Sciences. His major field is immunogenomics, allergies and oncogenomics. He was the winner of the 2001 annual science communication award of the Club of Hungarian Science Journalists.	JPL · 120324
120347 Salacia	2004 SB_{60}	Salacia, Roman goddess of salt water, Neptune's wife.	JPL · 120347
120349 Kalas	2004 XC_{42}	John Kalas (born 1948) and Elizabeth Kalas (born 1949) are active in proselytizing the night sky at public events	JPL · 120349
120350 Richburns	2005 JC_{1}	Rich Burns (born 1967) contributed to the OSIRIS-REx asteroid sample-return mission as SSMO Project Manager	JPL · 120350
120351 Beckymasterson	2005 JA_{168}	Rebecca A. Masterson (born 1975) is a research engineer at the Massachusetts Institute of Technology serving tirelessly in the central role of Instrument Manager for the student-built Regolith X-ray Imaging Spectrometer aboard the OSIRIS-REx asteroid sample-return mission.	JPL · 120351
120352 Gordonwong	2005 JG_{177}	Gordon H. Wong (born 1969) is a software engineer who has shown great patience and dedicated support to the effort required in the design, build, test, and flight of the student-built Regolith X-ray Imaging Spectrometer aboard the OSIRIS-REx asteroid sample-return mission.	JPL · 120352
120353 Katrinajackson	2005 LM_{6}	Katrina Jackson (born 1989) is a video producer for the OSIRIS-REx asteroid sample-return mission and the Hubble Space Telescope at NASA's Goddard Space Flight Center	JPL · 120353
120354 Mikejones	2005 LD_{40}	Michael Paul Jones (born 1991) worked as a student engineer at the Massachusetts Institute of Technology where he designed and implemented the solar X-ray monitor as a comparison instrument for the student-built Regolith X-ray Imaging Spectrometer aboard the OSIRIS-REx asteroid sample-return mission.	JPL · 120354
120361 Guido	2005 NZ	Ernesto Guido (born 1977), Italian amateur astronomer and discoverer of minor planets	JPL · 120361
120364 Stevecooley	2005 ND_{20}	Steve Cooley (born 1961) contributed to the OSIRIS-REx asteroid sample-return mission as Lead Flight Dynamics Engineer (proposal/Phase A).	JPL · 120364
120367 Grabow	2005 NL_{67}	Walter Grabow (1913–1987) was the owner of the Polaris Telescope Shop in Dearborn, Michigan in the 1960s. His patience and guidance helped many amateur astronomers in building or buying their telescopes.	JPL · 120367
120368 Phillipcoulter	2005 NO_{67}	Phillip Coulter (born 1973), an Optical Engineer working at the NASA Goddard Space Flight Center.	JPL · 120368
120372 Bridgetburns	2005 PY	Bridget Anne Burns (1967–2025), American master librarian at NASA Goddard Space Flight Center.	JPL · 120372
120375 Kugel	2005 PB_{6}	François Kugel (born 1959), French comet observer and a discoverer of minor planets	JPL · 120375

== 120401–120500 ==
back to top

Named minor planet	Provisional	This minor planet was named for...	Ref · Catalog
120405 Svyatylivka	2005 SQ_{4}	Svyatylivka, Ukraine, one of the headquarters of the Cossack army since the 17th century	JPL · 120405
120452 Schombert	1988 NA	James Schombert (born 1957) is an observational cosmologist, who started working during the second Palomar Observatory Sky Survey. He is now an astronomy professor at the University of Oregon working on galaxy formation and evolution and the interaction with dark matter using telescopes such as HST and Spitzer.	JPL · 120452
120460 Hambach	1990 TD_{7}	The Hambach Festival of 1832, held in the Maxburg castle above the village of Hambach, Germany, where some 30 000 liberals and democrats demonstrated in favour of a free and united Germany	JPL · 120460
120461 Gandhi	1990 TK_{9}	Mahatma Gandhi (1869–1948) was an Indian lawyer who advocated the complete independence of India. Gandhi believed that nonviolence was the path to liberty, and he became a model for many.	JPL · 120461
120462 Amanohashidate	1990 UE_{2}	Amanohashidate, a well-known tourist spot in Japan	JPL · 120462
120481 Johannwalter	1992 SP_{17}	Johann Walter (1496–1570), German cantor, director of the Saxon court orchestra, who wrote the melody of the hymn Each morning with its newborn light	JPL · 120481

== 120501–120600 ==
back to top

Named minor planet	Provisional	This minor planet was named for...	Ref · Catalog
120569 Huangrunqian	1995 FU_{20}	Huang Runqian (born 1933), Chinese astrophysicist and academician of the Chinese Academy of Sciences	JPL · 120569

== 120601–120700 ==
back to top

Named minor planet	Provisional	This minor planet was named for...	Ref · Catalog
120643 Rudimandl	1996 RU	Rudi W. Mandl (1894–1948), Czech-German electrical engineer and amateur astronomer, was interested in gravitational lensing.	JPL · 120643

== 120701–120800 ==
back to top

Named minor planet	Provisional	This minor planet was named for...	Ref · Catalog
120730 Zhouyouyuan	1997 SN_{33}	Zhou Youyuan (born 1938) is a leading astrophysicist and a member of the Chinese Academy of Sciences. He has made significant contributions to the study of quasars, active galactic nuclei, cosmology, large scale structures of the universe, and high-energy astrophysics.	JPL · 120730
120735 Ogawakiyoshi	1997 TD_{11}	Kiyoshi Ogawa (born 1957) is a member of Matsue Astronomy Club. He popularizes astronomy in Shimane prefecture and is an observing partner of the discoverer, Hiroshi Abe.	JPL · 120735
120741 Iijimayuichi	1997 UJ_{22}	Yuichi Iijima (1968–2012) was a Japanese aerospace system engineer of the Japan Aerospace Exploration Agency, who was one of the key members of the Japanese lunar orbiter SELENE.	JPL · 120741

== 120801–120900 ==
back to top

Named minor planet	Provisional	This minor planet was named for...	Ref · Catalog
There are no named minor planets in this number range

== 120901–121000 ==
back to top

Named minor planet	Provisional	This minor planet was named for...	Ref · Catalog
120942 Rendafuzhong	1998 TB_{18}	"Rendafuzhong" is a Chinese high school affiliated with Renmin University, located in Beijing Zhongguancun Technology Park	JPL · 120942

back to top

Preceded by 119,001–120,000	Meanings of minor-planet names List of minor planets: 120,001–121,000	Succeeded by 121,001–122,000
