= Zhou Youyuan =

Chinese astrophysicist (1938–2021)

- 周又元
- Born: July 30, 1938; Shanghai, China
- Died: March 12, 2021 (aged 82); Beijing, China
- Education: Peking University
- Scientific career
- Fields: Astrophysics
- Workplaces: University of Science and Technology of China

Zhou Youyuan (Chinese: 周又元; pinyin: Zhōu Yòuyuán; July 30, 1938 – March 12, 2021) was a Chinese astrophysicist and an academician of the Chinese Academy of Sciences.

== Biography ==
Zhou was born in Shanghai, on July 30, 1938, while his ancestral home was in Nanjing, Jiangsu. In 1960, he graduated from Peking University, where he majored in physics. He joined the faculty of the University of Science and Technology of China in 1960 and was promoted to professor in 1985. He served as director of its Center for Astrophysics from 1991 to 1995. In 1997, he became deputy director of the Academic Committee of the Open Laboratory for Cosmic Rays and High Energy Astrophysics, Chinese Academy of Sciences. On April 19, 2019, asteroid 120730 was named after him for his contribution to astronomy. On March 12, 2021, he died of illness in Beijing, at the age of 82.

== Honours and awards ==
- 1980 State Natural Science Award (Second Class)
- 1990 State Natural Science Award (Second Class)
- 2001 Member of the Chinese Academy of Sciences (CAS)
