= List of minor planets: 120001–121000 =

The following is a partial list of minor planets, running from minor-planet number 120001 through 121000, inclusive. The primary data for this and other partial lists is based on JPL's "Small-Body Orbital Elements" and data available from the Minor Planet Center. Critical list information is also provided by the MPC, unless otherwise specified from Lowell Observatory. A detailed description of the table's columns and additional sources are given on the main page including a complete list of every page in this series, and a statistical break-up on the dynamical classification of minor planets.

Also see the summary list of all named bodies in numerical and alphabetical order, and the corresponding naming citations for the number range of this particular list. New namings may only be added to this list after official publication, as the preannouncement of names is condemned by the Working Group for Small Bodies Nomenclature of the International Astronomical Union.

Near-Earth obj.	MBA (inner)	MBA (outer)	Centaur
Mars-crosser	MBA (middle)	Jupiter trojan	Trans-Neptunian obj.
Unclassified

== 120001–120100 ==
Designation			Discovery			Properties		Ref
Permanent	Provisional	Named after	Date	Site	Discoverer(s)	Category	Diam.	Ref
120001	2002 YL_{15}	—	December 31, 2002	Socorro	LINEAR	·	1.8 km	MPC · JPL
120002	2002 YD_{20}	—	December 31, 2002	Socorro	LINEAR	·	2.0 km	MPC · JPL
120003	2002 YU_{23}	—	December 31, 2002	Socorro	LINEAR	(6769)	2.3 km	MPC · JPL
120004	2002 YB_{24}	—	December 31, 2002	Socorro	LINEAR	·	1.4 km	MPC · JPL
120005	2002 YB_{31}	—	December 31, 2002	Socorro	LINEAR	NYS	1.5 km	MPC · JPL
120006	2002 YK_{31}	—	December 31, 2002	Socorro	LINEAR	·	1.9 km	MPC · JPL
120007	2002 YV_{31}	—	December 31, 2002	Socorro	LINEAR	·	1.8 km	MPC · JPL
120008	2003 AN_{5}	—	January 1, 2003	Socorro	LINEAR	V	1.3 km	MPC · JPL
120009	2003 AU_{5}	—	January 1, 2003	Socorro	LINEAR	HNS	2.7 km	MPC · JPL
120010	2003 AV_{5}	—	January 1, 2003	Socorro	LINEAR	NYS	1.9 km	MPC · JPL
120011	2003 AY_{5}	—	January 1, 2003	Socorro	LINEAR	·	1.8 km	MPC · JPL
120012	2003 AR_{7}	—	January 2, 2003	Socorro	LINEAR	PHO	1.9 km	MPC · JPL
120013	2003 AU_{17}	—	January 5, 2003	Anderson Mesa	LONEOS	·	2.6 km	MPC · JPL
120014	2003 AT_{21}	—	January 5, 2003	Socorro	LINEAR	·	2.0 km	MPC · JPL
120015	2003 AO_{24}	—	January 4, 2003	Socorro	LINEAR	·	1.1 km	MPC · JPL
120016	2003 AY_{27}	—	January 4, 2003	Socorro	LINEAR	·	3.6 km	MPC · JPL
120017	2003 AD_{37}	—	January 7, 2003	Socorro	LINEAR	V	1.2 km	MPC · JPL
120018	2003 AV_{38}	—	January 7, 2003	Socorro	LINEAR	·	1.8 km	MPC · JPL
120019	2003 AF_{39}	—	January 7, 2003	Socorro	LINEAR	V	1.3 km	MPC · JPL
120020	2003 AV_{40}	—	January 7, 2003	Socorro	LINEAR	·	3.0 km	MPC · JPL
120021	2003 AW_{40}	—	January 7, 2003	Socorro	LINEAR	·	1.3 km	MPC · JPL
120022	2003 AA_{41}	—	January 7, 2003	Socorro	LINEAR	·	1.6 km	MPC · JPL
120023	2003 AW_{44}	—	January 5, 2003	Socorro	LINEAR	·	1.7 km	MPC · JPL
120024	2003 AN_{50}	—	January 5, 2003	Socorro	LINEAR	·	1.8 km	MPC · JPL
120025	2003 AT_{52}	—	January 5, 2003	Socorro	LINEAR	·	1.6 km	MPC · JPL
120026	2003 AR_{55}	—	January 5, 2003	Socorro	LINEAR	·	1.5 km	MPC · JPL
120027	2003 AZ_{57}	—	January 5, 2003	Socorro	LINEAR	·	3.6 km	MPC · JPL
120028	2003 AK_{58}	—	January 5, 2003	Socorro	LINEAR	·	2.2 km	MPC · JPL
120029	2003 AD_{60}	—	January 5, 2003	Socorro	LINEAR	PHO	4.9 km	MPC · JPL
120030	2003 AF_{65}	—	January 7, 2003	Socorro	LINEAR	·	1.5 km	MPC · JPL
120031	2003 AZ_{68}	—	January 9, 2003	Socorro	LINEAR	MAR	2.2 km	MPC · JPL
120032	2003 AV_{69}	—	January 8, 2003	Socorro	LINEAR	·	3.2 km	MPC · JPL
120033	2003 AZ_{70}	—	January 10, 2003	Kitt Peak	Spacewatch	·	2.6 km	MPC · JPL
120034	2003 AK_{71}	—	January 10, 2003	Kitt Peak	Spacewatch	·	2.3 km	MPC · JPL
120035	2003 AB_{75}	—	January 10, 2003	Socorro	LINEAR	·	1.9 km	MPC · JPL
120036	2003 AM_{89}	—	January 4, 2003	Socorro	LINEAR	PHO	3.2 km	MPC · JPL
120037	2003 AG_{91}	—	January 5, 2003	Socorro	LINEAR	·	2.0 km	MPC · JPL
120038 Franlainsher	2003 BR_{1}	Franlainsher	January 26, 2003	Wrightwood	J. W. Young	·	1.4 km	MPC · JPL
120039	2003 BA_{2}	—	January 25, 2003	Anderson Mesa	LONEOS	V	1.4 km	MPC · JPL
120040 Pagliarini	2003 BF_{5}	Pagliarini	January 24, 2003	La Silla	A. Boattini, H. Scholl	·	1.9 km	MPC · JPL
120041	2003 BS_{6}	—	January 24, 2003	Palomar	NEAT	·	1.9 km	MPC · JPL
120042	2003 BQ_{9}	—	January 26, 2003	Palomar	NEAT	fast	1.4 km	MPC · JPL
120043	2003 BA_{11}	—	January 26, 2003	Anderson Mesa	LONEOS	TRE	5.4 km	MPC · JPL
120044	2003 BX_{20}	—	January 27, 2003	Haleakala	NEAT	·	1.4 km	MPC · JPL
120045	2003 BB_{25}	—	January 25, 2003	Palomar	NEAT	MAR	2.2 km	MPC · JPL
120046	2003 BT_{26}	—	January 26, 2003	Anderson Mesa	LONEOS	·	3.8 km	MPC · JPL
120047	2003 BR_{27}	—	January 26, 2003	Anderson Mesa	LONEOS	·	1.5 km	MPC · JPL
120048	2003 BJ_{29}	—	January 27, 2003	Anderson Mesa	LONEOS	·	2.5 km	MPC · JPL
120049	2003 BT_{29}	—	January 27, 2003	Socorro	LINEAR	·	3.7 km	MPC · JPL
120050	2003 BE_{40}	—	January 27, 2003	Kitt Peak	Spacewatch	NYS	2.4 km	MPC · JPL
120051	2003 BO_{66}	—	January 30, 2003	Anderson Mesa	LONEOS	·	2.8 km	MPC · JPL
120052	2003 BD_{67}	—	January 30, 2003	Haleakala	NEAT	·	2.4 km	MPC · JPL
120053	2003 BW_{69}	—	January 30, 2003	Anderson Mesa	LONEOS	NYS	2.0 km	MPC · JPL
120054	2003 BR_{71}	—	January 28, 2003	Socorro	LINEAR	·	1.6 km	MPC · JPL
120055	2003 BD_{76}	—	January 29, 2003	Palomar	NEAT	·	3.8 km	MPC · JPL
120056	2003 BA_{79}	—	January 31, 2003	Anderson Mesa	LONEOS	·	4.9 km	MPC · JPL
120057	2003 BJ_{82}	—	January 31, 2003	Socorro	LINEAR	·	1.4 km	MPC · JPL
120058	2003 BZ_{83}	—	January 31, 2003	Socorro	LINEAR	·	2.4 km	MPC · JPL
120059	2003 BA_{84}	—	January 31, 2003	Anderson Mesa	LONEOS	·	1.6 km	MPC · JPL
120060	2003 BP_{84}	—	January 30, 2003	Haleakala	NEAT	·	1.5 km	MPC · JPL
120061	2003 CO_{1}	—	February 1, 2003	Palomar	NEAT	centaur	82 km	MPC · JPL
120062	2003 CQ_{4}	—	February 1, 2003	Socorro	LINEAR	·	2.6 km	MPC · JPL
120063	2003 CE_{5}	—	February 1, 2003	Socorro	LINEAR	·	2.1 km	MPC · JPL
120064	2003 CD_{6}	—	February 1, 2003	Socorro	LINEAR	·	2.0 km	MPC · JPL
120065	2003 CM_{6}	—	February 1, 2003	Socorro	LINEAR	·	3.2 km	MPC · JPL
120066	2003 CH_{16}	—	February 7, 2003	Palomar	NEAT	NYS	2.1 km	MPC · JPL
120067	2003 CQ_{18}	—	February 6, 2003	Kitt Peak	Spacewatch	EUN	2.4 km	MPC · JPL
120068	2003 DC_{1}	—	February 21, 2003	Palomar	NEAT	·	2.9 km	MPC · JPL
120069	2003 DZ_{3}	—	February 22, 2003	Palomar	NEAT	·	2.4 km	MPC · JPL
120070	2003 DC_{8}	—	February 22, 2003	Palomar	NEAT	·	2.9 km	MPC · JPL
120071	2003 DM_{16}	—	February 21, 2003	Palomar	NEAT	EOS	3.0 km	MPC · JPL
120072	2003 DD_{18}	—	February 19, 2003	Palomar	NEAT	·	2.0 km	MPC · JPL
120073	2003 DR_{19}	—	February 22, 2003	Palomar	NEAT	·	4.2 km	MPC · JPL
120074 Bass	2003 EA	Bass	March 1, 2003	Jornada	Dixon, D. S.	·	3.0 km	MPC · JPL
120075	2003 EE_{2}	—	March 5, 2003	Socorro	LINEAR	·	3.7 km	MPC · JPL
120076	2003 EO_{2}	—	March 5, 2003	Socorro	LINEAR	·	2.2 km	MPC · JPL
120077	2003 EU_{3}	—	March 6, 2003	Palomar	NEAT	NEM	4.1 km	MPC · JPL
120078	2003 EH_{4}	—	March 6, 2003	Desert Eagle	W. K. Y. Yeung	·	2.7 km	MPC · JPL
120079	2003 EB_{10}	—	March 6, 2003	Anderson Mesa	LONEOS	·	3.0 km	MPC · JPL
120080	2003 ET_{11}	—	March 6, 2003	Socorro	LINEAR	·	3.5 km	MPC · JPL
120081	2003 ED_{12}	—	March 6, 2003	Socorro	LINEAR	·	3.7 km	MPC · JPL
120082	2003 EN_{12}	—	March 6, 2003	Socorro	LINEAR	·	2.0 km	MPC · JPL
120083	2003 EH_{17}	—	March 5, 2003	Socorro	LINEAR	·	2.7 km	MPC · JPL
120084	2003 EW_{20}	—	March 6, 2003	Anderson Mesa	LONEOS	·	3.3 km	MPC · JPL
120085	2003 EO_{23}	—	March 6, 2003	Socorro	LINEAR	(13314)	3.8 km	MPC · JPL
120086	2003 EU_{24}	—	March 6, 2003	Socorro	LINEAR	·	2.8 km	MPC · JPL
120087	2003 ET_{25}	—	March 6, 2003	Anderson Mesa	LONEOS	·	4.4 km	MPC · JPL
120088	2003 EW_{32}	—	March 7, 2003	Anderson Mesa	LONEOS	(5)	5.4 km	MPC · JPL
120089	2003 EA_{34}	—	March 7, 2003	Kitt Peak	Spacewatch	·	4.0 km	MPC · JPL
120090	2003 EB_{35}	—	March 7, 2003	Socorro	LINEAR	·	2.7 km	MPC · JPL
120091	2003 EH_{35}	—	March 7, 2003	Socorro	LINEAR	·	5.0 km	MPC · JPL
120092	2003 EB_{36}	—	March 7, 2003	Anderson Mesa	LONEOS	·	3.4 km	MPC · JPL
120093	2003 EE_{38}	—	March 8, 2003	Anderson Mesa	LONEOS	EUN	2.4 km	MPC · JPL
120094	2003 ET_{39}	—	March 8, 2003	Socorro	LINEAR	·	3.1 km	MPC · JPL
120095	2003 EN_{42}	—	March 9, 2003	Socorro	LINEAR	·	2.3 km	MPC · JPL
120096	2003 EG_{47}	—	March 9, 2003	Anderson Mesa	LONEOS	·	2.9 km	MPC · JPL
120097 Janniksinner	2003 EG_{50}	Janniksinner	March 10, 2003	Campo Imperatore	CINEOS	·	3.9 km	MPC · JPL
120098 Telmopievani	2003 EJ_{50}	Telmopievani	March 10, 2003	Campo Imperatore	F. Bernardi, M. Tombelli	EOS ·	3.5 km	MPC · JPL
120099	2003 EV_{55}	—	March 9, 2003	Socorro	LINEAR	·	6.4 km	MPC · JPL
120100	2003 EY_{57}	—	March 9, 2003	Socorro	LINEAR	·	7.3 km	MPC · JPL

== 120101–120200 ==
back to top

Designation			Discovery			Properties		Ref
Permanent	Provisional	Named after	Date	Site	Discoverer(s)	Category	Diam.	Ref
120101 Aureladina	2003 FP_{5}	Aureladina	March 26, 2003	Campo Imperatore	CINEOS	·	3.8 km	MPC · JPL
120102 Lucabenetti	2003 FU_{5}	Lucabenetti	March 26, 2003	Campo Imperatore	CINEOS	·	3.5 km	MPC · JPL
120103 Dolero	2003 FW_{6}	Dolero	March 24, 2003	Saint-Sulpice	B. Christophe	slow	4.1 km	MPC · JPL
120104	2003 FG_{9}	—	March 21, 2003	Palomar	NEAT	MAR	2.7 km	MPC · JPL
120105	2003 FM_{11}	—	March 23, 2003	Kitt Peak	Spacewatch	AST	2.7 km	MPC · JPL
120106	2003 FK_{15}	—	March 23, 2003	Catalina	CSS	·	3.7 km	MPC · JPL
120107	2003 FH_{17}	—	March 24, 2003	Kitt Peak	Spacewatch	NYS	2.0 km	MPC · JPL
120108	2003 FP_{24}	—	March 24, 2003	Kitt Peak	Spacewatch	·	3.3 km	MPC · JPL
120109	2003 FQ_{29}	—	March 25, 2003	Palomar	NEAT	·	2.6 km	MPC · JPL
120110	2003 FZ_{29}	—	March 25, 2003	Palomar	NEAT	GEF	2.3 km	MPC · JPL
120111	2003 FN_{38}	—	March 23, 2003	Kitt Peak	Spacewatch	·	6.0 km	MPC · JPL
120112 Elizabethacton	2003 FS_{51}	Elizabethacton	March 25, 2003	Catalina	CSS	·	2.7 km	MPC · JPL
120113	2003 FJ_{58}	—	March 26, 2003	Socorro	LINEAR	·	3.6 km	MPC · JPL
120114	2003 FZ_{64}	—	March 26, 2003	Palomar	NEAT	·	1.3 km	MPC · JPL
120115	2003 FW_{65}	—	March 26, 2003	Palomar	NEAT	EOS	3.2 km	MPC · JPL
120116	2003 FR_{75}	—	March 27, 2003	Palomar	NEAT	·	2.8 km	MPC · JPL
120117	2003 FZ_{80}	—	March 27, 2003	Socorro	LINEAR	EUN	1.8 km	MPC · JPL
120118	2003 FF_{83}	—	March 27, 2003	Palomar	NEAT	HNS	2.9 km	MPC · JPL
120119	2003 FK_{84}	—	March 28, 2003	Palomar	NEAT	·	2.8 km	MPC · JPL
120120 Kankelborg	2003 FM_{84}	Kankelborg	March 28, 2003	Needville	J. Dellinger	KOR ·	2.2 km	MPC · JPL
120121 Libbyadelman	2003 FO_{85}	Libbyadelman	March 28, 2003	Catalina	CSS	·	6.2 km	MPC · JPL
120122	2003 FE_{88}	—	March 28, 2003	Kitt Peak	Spacewatch	(5)	2.9 km	MPC · JPL
120123	2003 FT_{92}	—	March 29, 2003	Anderson Mesa	LONEOS	EUN	1.9 km	MPC · JPL
120124	2003 FO_{98}	—	March 30, 2003	Kitt Peak	Spacewatch	·	3.0 km	MPC · JPL
120125	2003 FR_{100}	—	March 31, 2003	Anderson Mesa	LONEOS	EMA	8.1 km	MPC · JPL
120126	2003 FH_{101}	—	March 31, 2003	Socorro	LINEAR	·	4.1 km	MPC · JPL
120127	2003 FJ_{101}	—	March 31, 2003	Socorro	LINEAR	·	3.3 km	MPC · JPL
120128	2003 FP_{106}	—	March 26, 2003	Kitt Peak	Spacewatch	·	7.1 km	MPC · JPL
120129	2003 FT_{117}	—	March 25, 2003	Palomar	NEAT	·	2.2 km	MPC · JPL
120130	2003 FL_{119}	—	March 26, 2003	Anderson Mesa	LONEOS	RAF	1.5 km	MPC · JPL
120131 MAVEN	2003 FX_{119}	MAVEN	March 26, 2003	Anderson Mesa	LONEOS	·	2.7 km	MPC · JPL
120132	2003 FY_{128}	—	March 26, 2003	Palomar	NEAT	SDO	460 km	MPC · JPL
120133	2003 GJ_{4}	—	April 1, 2003	Socorro	LINEAR	MRX	2.3 km	MPC · JPL
120134	2003 GP_{6}	—	April 2, 2003	Socorro	LINEAR	·	2.6 km	MPC · JPL
120135	2003 GF_{7}	—	April 1, 2003	Socorro	LINEAR	·	2.0 km	MPC · JPL
120136	2003 GY_{12}	—	April 1, 2003	Socorro	LINEAR	·	4.4 km	MPC · JPL
120137	2003 GW_{14}	—	April 3, 2003	Haleakala	NEAT	·	3.8 km	MPC · JPL
120138	2003 GB_{17}	—	April 5, 2003	Haleakala	NEAT	·	6.5 km	MPC · JPL
120139	2003 GV_{20}	—	April 3, 2003	Reedy Creek	J. Broughton	·	5.2 km	MPC · JPL
120140	2003 GB_{21}	—	April 3, 2003	Uccle	Uccle	EOS	4.6 km	MPC · JPL
120141 Lucaslara	2003 GO_{21}	Lucaslara	April 7, 2003	Majorca	OAM	MRX	1.7 km	MPC · JPL
120142	2003 GL_{38}	—	April 5, 2003	Haleakala	NEAT	·	4.8 km	MPC · JPL
120143	2003 GG_{42}	—	April 9, 2003	Reedy Creek	J. Broughton	·	7.0 km	MPC · JPL
120144	2003 GM_{43}	—	April 9, 2003	Socorro	LINEAR	615	3.1 km	MPC · JPL
120145	2003 GZ_{47}	—	April 8, 2003	Socorro	LINEAR	·	7.4 km	MPC · JPL
120146	2003 GY_{49}	—	April 7, 2003	Socorro	LINEAR	·	4.2 km	MPC · JPL
120147	2003 GZ_{49}	—	April 7, 2003	Socorro	LINEAR	·	1.8 km	MPC · JPL
120148	2003 GO_{51}	—	April 12, 2003	Emerald Lane	L. Ball	·	2.5 km	MPC · JPL
120149	2003 GG_{54}	—	April 6, 2003	Socorro	LINEAR	·	2.6 km	MPC · JPL
120150	2003 GN_{54}	—	April 3, 2003	Anderson Mesa	LONEOS	·	3.4 km	MPC · JPL
120151	2003 GQ_{54}	—	April 3, 2003	Anderson Mesa	LONEOS	·	5.5 km	MPC · JPL
120152	2003 HJ_{1}	—	April 21, 2003	Siding Spring	R. H. McNaught	EOS	3.8 km	MPC · JPL
120153 Hoekenga	2003 HR_{2}	Hoekenga	April 21, 2003	Catalina	CSS	EOS	3.6 km	MPC · JPL
120154	2003 HP_{4}	—	April 24, 2003	Anderson Mesa	LONEOS	·	4.8 km	MPC · JPL
120155	2003 HS_{8}	—	April 24, 2003	Anderson Mesa	LONEOS	·	5.7 km	MPC · JPL
120156	2003 HB_{10}	—	April 25, 2003	Kitt Peak	Spacewatch	·	3.3 km	MPC · JPL
120157	2003 HC_{10}	—	April 25, 2003	Kitt Peak	Spacewatch	·	2.3 km	MPC · JPL
120158	2003 HC_{15}	—	April 26, 2003	Haleakala	NEAT	EOS	3.9 km	MPC · JPL
120159	2003 HC_{23}	—	April 26, 2003	Haleakala	NEAT	·	6.9 km	MPC · JPL
120160	2003 HG_{30}	—	April 28, 2003	Anderson Mesa	LONEOS	EUN	2.8 km	MPC · JPL
120161	2003 HB_{31}	—	April 26, 2003	Kitt Peak	Spacewatch	VER	5.8 km	MPC · JPL
120162	2003 HN_{36}	—	April 29, 2003	Kitt Peak	Spacewatch	KOR	2.3 km	MPC · JPL
120163	2003 HG_{44}	—	April 27, 2003	Anderson Mesa	LONEOS	·	6.1 km	MPC · JPL
120164	2003 HV_{45}	—	April 27, 2003	Socorro	LINEAR	·	7.8 km	MPC · JPL
120165	2003 HE_{46}	—	April 28, 2003	Socorro	LINEAR	TIR	3.5 km	MPC · JPL
120166	2003 HC_{47}	—	April 28, 2003	Socorro	LINEAR	·	8.3 km	MPC · JPL
120167	2003 HT_{47}	—	April 29, 2003	Haleakala	NEAT	·	5.4 km	MPC · JPL
120168	2003 HW_{52}	—	April 29, 2003	Socorro	LINEAR	·	2.9 km	MPC · JPL
120169	2003 HD_{53}	—	April 30, 2003	Socorro	LINEAR	EOS	3.6 km	MPC · JPL
120170	2003 JO_{5}	—	May 1, 2003	Socorro	LINEAR	·	3.2 km	MPC · JPL
120171	2003 JT_{6}	—	May 1, 2003	Socorro	LINEAR	·	4.0 km	MPC · JPL
120172	2003 JU_{9}	—	May 3, 2003	Kitt Peak	Spacewatch	HYG	5.5 km	MPC · JPL
120173	2003 JA_{10}	—	May 1, 2003	Socorro	LINEAR	·	6.8 km	MPC · JPL
120174 Jeffjenny	2003 KM_{3}	Jeffjenny	May 23, 2003	Wrightwood	J. W. Young	EUN	2.2 km	MPC · JPL
120175	2003 KB_{11}	—	May 24, 2003	Haleakala	NEAT	3:2	8.0 km	MPC · JPL
120176	2003 KQ_{30}	—	May 26, 2003	Kitt Peak	Spacewatch	·	4.5 km	MPC · JPL
120177	2003 LW_{3}	—	June 5, 2003	Reedy Creek	J. Broughton	·	3.4 km	MPC · JPL
120178	2003 OP_{32}	—	July 26, 2003	Palomar	M. E. Brown, C. A. Trujillo, D. L. Rabinowitz	Haumea	274 km	MPC · JPL
120179	2003 QY_{75}	—	August 24, 2003	Socorro	LINEAR	3:2	11 km	MPC · JPL
120180	2003 QH_{104}	—	August 27, 2003	Reedy Creek	J. Broughton	·	3.7 km	MPC · JPL
120181	2003 UR_{292}	—	October 24, 2003	Kitt Peak	M. W. Buie	centaur	136 km	MPC · JPL
120182	2003 VQ_{2}	—	November 14, 2003	Palomar	NEAT	·	2.7 km	MPC · JPL
120183	2003 YR_{138}	—	December 27, 2003	Socorro	LINEAR	·	8.0 km	MPC · JPL
120184	2004 BB_{45}	—	January 22, 2004	Socorro	LINEAR	H	900 m	MPC · JPL
120185	2004 BB_{96}	—	January 30, 2004	Socorro	LINEAR	PHO	2.2 km	MPC · JPL
120186 Suealeman	2004 BQ_{111}	Suealeman	January 29, 2004	Catalina	CSS	PHO	2.5 km	MPC · JPL
120187	2004 CO_{3}	—	February 10, 2004	Palomar	NEAT	·	3.1 km	MPC · JPL
120188 Amyaqueche	2004 CL_{12}	Amyaqueche	February 11, 2004	Catalina	CSS	·	1.3 km	MPC · JPL
120189	2004 CY_{84}	—	February 13, 2004	Palomar	NEAT	·	1.5 km	MPC · JPL
120190	2004 CL_{97}	—	February 13, 2004	Kitt Peak	Spacewatch	NYS ·	3.6 km	MPC · JPL
120191 Tombagg	2004 CG_{100}	Tombagg	February 15, 2004	Catalina	CSS	·	2.2 km	MPC · JPL
120192	2004 CM_{106}	—	February 14, 2004	Palomar	NEAT	·	3.6 km	MPC · JPL
120193	2004 DM_{6}	—	February 16, 2004	Kitt Peak	Spacewatch	·	1.7 km	MPC · JPL
120194	2004 DR_{11}	—	February 17, 2004	Kitt Peak	Spacewatch	MAS	1.5 km	MPC · JPL
120195	2004 DL_{15}	—	February 17, 2004	Socorro	LINEAR	·	1.3 km	MPC · JPL
120196 Kevinballou	2004 DR_{21}	Kevinballou	February 17, 2004	Catalina	CSS	·	2.1 km	MPC · JPL
120197	2004 DU_{37}	—	February 19, 2004	Socorro	LINEAR	H	870 m	MPC · JPL
120198	2004 DT_{42}	—	February 20, 2004	Haleakala	NEAT	H	1.1 km	MPC · JPL
120199	2004 DN_{43}	—	February 23, 2004	Socorro	LINEAR	V	1.2 km	MPC · JPL
120200	2004 DE_{60}	—	February 26, 2004	Socorro	LINEAR	·	2.6 km	MPC · JPL

== 120201–120300 ==
back to top

Designation			Discovery			Properties		Ref
Permanent	Provisional	Named after	Date	Site	Discoverer(s)	Category	Diam.	Ref
120201	2004 ES_{2}	—	March 13, 2004	Palomar	NEAT	PHO	3.2 km	MPC · JPL
120202	2004 EL_{6}	—	March 12, 2004	Palomar	NEAT	·	1.4 km	MPC · JPL
120203	2004 EE_{7}	—	March 12, 2004	Palomar	NEAT	·	1.7 km	MPC · JPL
120204	2004 EY_{13}	—	March 11, 2004	Palomar	NEAT	·	5.1 km	MPC · JPL
120205	2004 EF_{27}	—	March 14, 2004	Palomar	NEAT	·	2.2 km	MPC · JPL
120206	2004 EA_{30}	—	March 15, 2004	Kitt Peak	Spacewatch	NYS	2.7 km	MPC · JPL
120207	2004 EG_{31}	—	March 13, 2004	Palomar	NEAT	·	2.1 km	MPC · JPL
120208 Brentbarbee	2004 EK_{32}	Brentbarbee	March 15, 2004	Catalina	CSS	·	1.7 km	MPC · JPL
120209	2004 ES_{36}	—	March 13, 2004	Palomar	NEAT	NYS	1.8 km	MPC · JPL
120210	2004 EN_{39}	—	March 15, 2004	Kitt Peak	Spacewatch	·	2.5 km	MPC · JPL
120211	2004 ES_{39}	—	March 15, 2004	Kitt Peak	Spacewatch	NYS	2.0 km	MPC · JPL
120212	2004 EM_{54}	—	March 13, 2004	Palomar	NEAT	V	1.0 km	MPC · JPL
120213	2004 EF_{56}	—	March 14, 2004	Palomar	NEAT	·	1.6 km	MPC · JPL
120214 Danteberdeguez	2004 EG_{78}	Danteberdeguez	March 15, 2004	Catalina	CSS	·	3.5 km	MPC · JPL
120215 Kevinberry	2004 EM_{79}	Kevinberry	March 15, 2004	Catalina	CSS	·	1.8 km	MPC · JPL
120216	2004 EW_{95}	—	March 14, 2004	Kitt Peak	Spacewatch	plutino	291 km	MPC · JPL
120217	2004 FL	—	March 16, 2004	Socorro	LINEAR	H	1.3 km	MPC · JPL
120218 Richardberry	2004 FN_{2}	Richardberry	March 17, 2004	Catalina	CSS	H	840 m	MPC · JPL
120219	2004 FZ_{15}	—	March 25, 2004	Socorro	LINEAR	H	1.4 km	MPC · JPL
120220	2004 FP_{17}	—	March 26, 2004	Socorro	LINEAR	PHO	2.0 km	MPC · JPL
120221	2004 FJ_{18}	—	March 28, 2004	Desert Eagle	W. K. Y. Yeung	·	3.7 km	MPC · JPL
120222	2004 FD_{23}	—	March 17, 2004	Kitt Peak	Spacewatch	MAS	1.3 km	MPC · JPL
120223	2004 FZ_{28}	—	March 28, 2004	Socorro	LINEAR	H	920 m	MPC · JPL
120224	2004 FB_{39}	—	March 17, 2004	Socorro	LINEAR	·	2.0 km	MPC · JPL
120225	2004 FK_{45}	—	March 16, 2004	Socorro	LINEAR	·	1.4 km	MPC · JPL
120226	2004 FR_{49}	—	March 18, 2004	Socorro	LINEAR	NYS	1.8 km	MPC · JPL
120227	2004 FZ_{50}	—	March 18, 2004	Kitt Peak	Spacewatch	·	1.4 km	MPC · JPL
120228	2004 FB_{52}	—	March 19, 2004	Socorro	LINEAR	·	1.2 km	MPC · JPL
120229	2004 FX_{57}	—	March 17, 2004	Socorro	LINEAR	·	5.2 km	MPC · JPL
120230	2004 FQ_{63}	—	March 19, 2004	Socorro	LINEAR	·	1.3 km	MPC · JPL
120231	2004 FF_{64}	—	March 19, 2004	Socorro	LINEAR	·	2.5 km	MPC · JPL
120232	2004 FH_{65}	—	March 19, 2004	Socorro	LINEAR	·	1.3 km	MPC · JPL
120233	2004 FZ_{65}	—	March 19, 2004	Socorro	LINEAR	JUN	2.5 km	MPC · JPL
120234	2004 FD_{66}	—	March 19, 2004	Socorro	LINEAR	·	4.0 km	MPC · JPL
120235	2004 FR_{67}	—	March 20, 2004	Socorro	LINEAR	·	1.9 km	MPC · JPL
120236	2004 FA_{85}	—	March 18, 2004	Socorro	LINEAR	·	1.8 km	MPC · JPL
120237	2004 FQ_{85}	—	March 18, 2004	Siding Spring	SSS	H	1.0 km	MPC · JPL
120238	2004 FL_{90}	—	March 20, 2004	Socorro	LINEAR	·	3.1 km	MPC · JPL
120239	2004 FP_{90}	—	March 20, 2004	Socorro	LINEAR	·	3.0 km	MPC · JPL
120240	2004 FM_{98}	—	March 23, 2004	Socorro	LINEAR	·	3.1 km	MPC · JPL
120241	2004 FM_{102}	—	March 20, 2004	Socorro	LINEAR	PHO	3.6 km	MPC · JPL
120242	2004 FE_{109}	—	March 24, 2004	Anderson Mesa	LONEOS	·	2.0 km	MPC · JPL
120243	2004 FG_{110}	—	March 24, 2004	Anderson Mesa	LONEOS	·	1.3 km	MPC · JPL
120244	2004 FG_{122}	—	March 25, 2004	Anderson Mesa	LONEOS	·	1.3 km	MPC · JPL
120245	2004 FC_{127}	—	March 27, 2004	Socorro	LINEAR	·	1.4 km	MPC · JPL
120246	2004 FM_{139}	—	March 24, 2004	Anderson Mesa	LONEOS	·	1.7 km	MPC · JPL
120247	2004 FR_{139}	—	March 25, 2004	Anderson Mesa	LONEOS	NYS	1.5 km	MPC · JPL
120248	2004 FR_{140}	—	March 27, 2004	Anderson Mesa	LONEOS	·	1.2 km	MPC · JPL
120249	2004 GQ_{1}	—	April 11, 2004	Palomar	NEAT	V	1.1 km	MPC · JPL
120250	2004 GU_{4}	—	April 11, 2004	Palomar	NEAT	·	1.6 km	MPC · JPL
120251	2004 GB_{6}	—	April 12, 2004	Socorro	LINEAR	·	2.7 km	MPC · JPL
120252	2004 GA_{10}	—	April 13, 2004	Mount Graham	Ryan, W. H., Jamieson, Q.	NYS	1.7 km	MPC · JPL
120253	2004 GO_{14}	—	April 13, 2004	Palomar	NEAT	·	2.8 km	MPC · JPL
120254	2004 GX_{14}	—	April 13, 2004	Siding Spring	SSS	·	1.9 km	MPC · JPL
120255	2004 GG_{17}	—	April 10, 2004	Palomar	NEAT	PHO	2.6 km	MPC · JPL
120256	2004 GV_{17}	—	April 12, 2004	Kitt Peak	Spacewatch	NYS	1.6 km	MPC · JPL
120257	2004 GL_{18}	—	April 13, 2004	Socorro	LINEAR	·	2.9 km	MPC · JPL
120258	2004 GS_{18}	—	April 14, 2004	Kitt Peak	Spacewatch	·	7.6 km	MPC · JPL
120259	2004 GB_{20}	—	April 15, 2004	Desert Eagle	W. K. Y. Yeung	·	1.7 km	MPC · JPL
120260	2004 GL_{20}	—	April 9, 2004	Siding Spring	SSS	·	1.5 km	MPC · JPL
120261	2004 GS_{27}	—	April 15, 2004	Palomar	NEAT	EUN	2.2 km	MPC · JPL
120262	2004 GP_{29}	—	April 12, 2004	Palomar	NEAT	·	1.6 km	MPC · JPL
120263	2004 GJ_{30}	—	April 12, 2004	Palomar	NEAT	·	2.0 km	MPC · JPL
120264	2004 GJ_{45}	—	April 12, 2004	Kitt Peak	Spacewatch	·	1.9 km	MPC · JPL
120265	2004 GE_{55}	—	April 13, 2004	Kitt Peak	Spacewatch	NYS	960 m	MPC · JPL
120266	2004 GF_{59}	—	April 12, 2004	Palomar	NEAT	·	3.1 km	MPC · JPL
120267	2004 GP_{68}	—	April 13, 2004	Kitt Peak	Spacewatch	ADE	3.1 km	MPC · JPL
120268	2004 GE_{72}	—	April 14, 2004	Anderson Mesa	LONEOS	·	2.0 km	MPC · JPL
120269	2004 GE_{75}	—	April 14, 2004	Anderson Mesa	LONEOS	PHO	3.9 km	MPC · JPL
120270	2004 GW_{80}	—	April 13, 2004	Kitt Peak	Spacewatch	·	1.0 km	MPC · JPL
120271	2004 HM_{3}	—	April 16, 2004	Palomar	NEAT	EUN	2.8 km	MPC · JPL
120272	2004 HK_{5}	—	April 17, 2004	Socorro	LINEAR	·	2.3 km	MPC · JPL
120273	2004 HP_{5}	—	April 17, 2004	Socorro	LINEAR	·	2.9 km	MPC · JPL
120274	2004 HE_{6}	—	April 17, 2004	Socorro	LINEAR	MAS	1.3 km	MPC · JPL
120275	2004 HB_{8}	—	April 16, 2004	Kitt Peak	Spacewatch	·	1.3 km	MPC · JPL
120276	2004 HU_{9}	—	April 17, 2004	Socorro	LINEAR	·	1.2 km	MPC · JPL
120277	2004 HV_{9}	—	April 17, 2004	Socorro	LINEAR	·	1.6 km	MPC · JPL
120278	2004 HL_{17}	—	April 16, 2004	Siding Spring	SSS	·	1.0 km	MPC · JPL
120279	2004 HG_{18}	—	April 17, 2004	Socorro	LINEAR	H	1.2 km	MPC · JPL
120280	2004 HP_{32}	—	April 20, 2004	Socorro	LINEAR	·	1.6 km	MPC · JPL
120281	2004 HV_{32}	—	April 21, 2004	Socorro	LINEAR	·	1.0 km	MPC · JPL
120282	2004 HB_{34}	—	April 16, 2004	Palomar	NEAT	EUN	2.3 km	MPC · JPL
120283	2004 HK_{35}	—	April 20, 2004	Socorro	LINEAR	·	3.0 km	MPC · JPL
120284	2004 HO_{43}	—	April 21, 2004	Kitt Peak	Spacewatch	NYS	1.6 km	MPC · JPL
120285 Brentbos	2004 HE_{47}	Brentbos	April 22, 2004	Catalina	CSS	MAR	2.5 km	MPC · JPL
120286	2004 HX_{56}	—	April 27, 2004	Socorro	LINEAR	T_{j} (2.94)	6.3 km	MPC · JPL
120287	2004 HO_{59}	—	April 25, 2004	Kitt Peak	Spacewatch	3:2	9.9 km	MPC · JPL
120288	2004 HK_{61}	—	April 25, 2004	Socorro	LINEAR	·	2.3 km	MPC · JPL
120289	2004 HM_{61}	—	April 25, 2004	Socorro	LINEAR	·	1.1 km	MPC · JPL
120290	2004 HB_{62}	—	April 29, 2004	Socorro	LINEAR	(5)	2.2 km	MPC · JPL
120291	2004 HA_{75}	—	April 30, 2004	Kitt Peak	Spacewatch	·	6.4 km	MPC · JPL
120292	2004 JA_{9}	—	May 13, 2004	Palomar	NEAT	NYS	1.3 km	MPC · JPL
120293	2004 JQ_{9}	—	May 13, 2004	Kitt Peak	Spacewatch	·	2.8 km	MPC · JPL
120294	2004 JW_{15}	—	May 10, 2004	Palomar	NEAT	·	2.1 km	MPC · JPL
120295	2004 JO_{16}	—	May 11, 2004	Anderson Mesa	LONEOS	·	2.6 km	MPC · JPL
120296	2004 JH_{17}	—	May 12, 2004	Siding Spring	SSS	·	2.0 km	MPC · JPL
120297	2004 JD_{22}	—	May 9, 2004	Kitt Peak	Spacewatch	·	2.2 km	MPC · JPL
120298	2004 JY_{24}	—	May 15, 2004	Socorro	LINEAR	·	3.7 km	MPC · JPL
120299 Billlynch	2004 JL_{28}	Billlynch	May 9, 2004	Sandlot	G. Hug	·	1.8 km	MPC · JPL
120300	2004 JV_{31}	—	May 14, 2004	Socorro	LINEAR	EUN	2.4 km	MPC · JPL

== 120301–120400 ==
back to top

Designation			Discovery			Properties		Ref
Permanent	Provisional	Named after	Date	Site	Discoverer(s)	Category	Diam.	Ref
120301	2004 JL_{34}	—	May 15, 2004	Socorro	LINEAR	·	1 km	MPC · JPL
120302	2004 JA_{36}	—	May 13, 2004	Anderson Mesa	LONEOS	·	1.3 km	MPC · JPL
120303	2004 JY_{37}	—	May 14, 2004	Socorro	LINEAR	·	3.0 km	MPC · JPL
120304	2004 JP_{43}	—	May 9, 2004	Kitt Peak	Spacewatch	·	1.4 km	MPC · JPL
120305	2004 KF	—	May 16, 2004	Reedy Creek	J. Broughton	·	1.5 km	MPC · JPL
120306	2004 KE_{6}	—	May 17, 2004	Socorro	LINEAR	·	2.1 km	MPC · JPL
120307	2004 KX_{9}	—	May 19, 2004	Socorro	LINEAR	V	1.2 km	MPC · JPL
120308 Deebradel	2004 KN_{12}	Deebradel	May 22, 2004	Catalina	CSS	·	4.2 km	MPC · JPL
120309	2004 KX_{15}	—	May 23, 2004	Socorro	LINEAR	·	4.0 km	MPC · JPL
120310	2004 KY_{16}	—	May 24, 2004	Socorro	LINEAR	EUN	2.4 km	MPC · JPL
120311	2004 LX_{2}	—	June 11, 2004	Palomar	NEAT	·	3.3 km	MPC · JPL
120312	2004 LY_{2}	—	June 5, 2004	Palomar	NEAT	·	2.8 km	MPC · JPL
120313	2004 LF_{4}	—	June 11, 2004	Socorro	LINEAR	·	3.4 km	MPC · JPL
120314	2004 LQ_{4}	—	June 11, 2004	Kitt Peak	Spacewatch	EUN	2.5 km	MPC · JPL
120315	2004 LZ_{4}	—	June 12, 2004	Kitt Peak	Spacewatch	BRA	2.9 km	MPC · JPL
120316	2004 LB_{5}	—	June 12, 2004	Palomar	NEAT	EUN	2.1 km	MPC · JPL
120317	2004 LY_{6}	—	June 11, 2004	Socorro	LINEAR	·	3.7 km	MPC · JPL
120318	2004 LQ_{13}	—	June 11, 2004	Socorro	LINEAR	(5)	2.6 km	MPC · JPL
120319	2004 LZ_{15}	—	June 12, 2004	Socorro	LINEAR	·	2.6 km	MPC · JPL
120320	2004 LL_{17}	—	June 14, 2004	Socorro	LINEAR	·	2.7 km	MPC · JPL
120321	2004 LH_{30}	—	June 13, 2004	Socorro	LINEAR	·	4.5 km	MPC · JPL
120322	2004 MG_{2}	—	June 17, 2004	Palomar	NEAT	GEF	1.8 km	MPC · JPL
120323	2004 MQ_{2}	—	June 18, 2004	Socorro	LINEAR	·	2.2 km	MPC · JPL
120324 Falusandrás	2004 MV_{3}	Falusandrás	June 21, 2004	Piszkéstető	K. Sárneczky	·	1.4 km	MPC · JPL
120325	2004 MH_{7}	—	June 26, 2004	Kitt Peak	Spacewatch	ADE ·	3.7 km	MPC · JPL
120326	2004 NK_{3}	—	July 9, 2004	Reedy Creek	J. Broughton	KOR	2.5 km	MPC · JPL
120327	2004 NV_{10}	—	July 9, 2004	Siding Spring	SSS	·	4.7 km	MPC · JPL
120328	2004 NP_{16}	—	July 11, 2004	Socorro	LINEAR	PHO	2.8 km	MPC · JPL
120329	2004 ND_{17}	—	July 11, 2004	Socorro	LINEAR	3:2 · SHU	9.8 km	MPC · JPL
120330	2004 NO_{25}	—	July 11, 2004	Socorro	LINEAR	·	2.9 km	MPC · JPL
120331	2004 NP_{26}	—	July 11, 2004	Socorro	LINEAR	·	3.3 km	MPC · JPL
120332	2004 OS_{2}	—	July 16, 2004	Socorro	LINEAR	·	3.4 km	MPC · JPL
120333	2004 OY_{11}	—	July 27, 2004	Socorro	LINEAR	·	3.1 km	MPC · JPL
120334	2004 OS_{12}	—	July 16, 2004	Socorro	LINEAR	·	5.2 km	MPC · JPL
120335	2004 OP_{14}	—	July 17, 2004	Palomar	NEAT	·	4.0 km	MPC · JPL
120336	2004 PX_{53}	—	August 8, 2004	Socorro	LINEAR	3:2	9.7 km	MPC · JPL
120337	2004 PN_{56}	—	August 9, 2004	Socorro	LINEAR	MAR	2.1 km	MPC · JPL
120338	2004 PX_{65}	—	August 10, 2004	Anderson Mesa	LONEOS	·	7.7 km	MPC · JPL
120339	2004 PM_{71}	—	August 8, 2004	Socorro	LINEAR	KOR	2.2 km	MPC · JPL
120340	2004 PD_{106}	—	August 14, 2004	Palomar	NEAT	·	3.1 km	MPC · JPL
120341	2004 QX_{12}	—	August 21, 2004	Siding Spring	SSS	EOS	4.2 km	MPC · JPL
120342	2004 RU_{113}	—	September 7, 2004	Socorro	LINEAR	·	3.4 km	MPC · JPL
120343	2004 RU_{137}	—	September 8, 2004	Socorro	LINEAR	·	4.3 km	MPC · JPL
120344	2004 RU_{150}	—	September 9, 2004	Socorro	LINEAR	KOR	2.6 km	MPC · JPL
120345	2004 RQ_{193}	—	September 10, 2004	Socorro	LINEAR	EOS	4.1 km	MPC · JPL
120346	2004 RG_{319}	—	September 13, 2004	Socorro	LINEAR	·	6.1 km	MPC · JPL
120347 Salacia	2004 SB_{60}	Salacia	September 22, 2004	Palomar	Roe, H. G., M. E. Brown, K. M. Barkume	cubewano (hot) · moon	866 km	MPC · JPL
120348	2004 TY_{364}	—	October 3, 2004	Palomar	M. E. Brown, C. A. Trujillo, D. L. Rabinowitz	other TNO	512 km	MPC · JPL
120349 Kalas	2004 XC_{42}	Kalas	December 12, 2004	Jarnac	Jarnac	·	4.5 km	MPC · JPL
120350 Richburns	2005 JC_{1}	Richburns	May 3, 2005	Catalina	CSS	·	2.5 km	MPC · JPL
120351 Beckymasterson	2005 JA_{168}	Beckymasterson	May 14, 2005	Catalina	CSS	·	2.8 km	MPC · JPL
120352 Gordonwong	2005 JG_{177}	Gordonwong	May 13, 2005	Catalina	CSS	·	1.6 km	MPC · JPL
120353 Katrinajackson	2005 LM_{6}	Katrinajackson	June 4, 2005	Catalina	CSS	·	1.7 km	MPC · JPL
120354 Mikejones	2005 LD_{40}	Mikejones	June 13, 2005	Mount Lemmon	Mount Lemmon Survey	·	1.1 km	MPC · JPL
120355	2005 MD_{5}	—	June 16, 2005	Catalina	CSS	PHO	3.3 km	MPC · JPL
120356	2005 MS_{8}	—	June 28, 2005	Palomar	NEAT	·	1.8 km	MPC · JPL
120357	2005 MZ_{15}	—	June 30, 2005	Anderson Mesa	LONEOS	·	1.3 km	MPC · JPL
120358	2005 MN_{36}	—	June 30, 2005	Kitt Peak	Spacewatch	NYS	1.9 km	MPC · JPL
120359	2005 ME_{41}	—	June 30, 2005	Palomar	NEAT	·	2.4 km	MPC · JPL
120360	2005 MT_{43}	—	June 27, 2005	Palomar	NEAT	CYB	6.2 km	MPC · JPL
120361 Guido	2005 NZ	Guido	July 3, 2005	New Mexico Skies	Lowe, A.	·	4.0 km	MPC · JPL
120362	2005 NK_{8}	—	July 1, 2005	Kitt Peak	Spacewatch	·	2.5 km	MPC · JPL
120363	2005 NU_{17}	—	July 3, 2005	Palomar	NEAT	T_{j} (2.94) · HIL	10 km	MPC · JPL
120364 Stevecooley	2005 ND_{20}	Stevecooley	July 3, 2005	Catalina	CSS	MAR	2.2 km	MPC · JPL
120365	2005 NP_{48}	—	July 7, 2005	Anderson Mesa	LONEOS	·	1.7 km	MPC · JPL
120366	2005 NC_{56}	—	July 5, 2005	Siding Spring	SSS	PHO	2.3 km	MPC · JPL
120367 Grabow	2005 NL_{67}	Grabow	July 2, 2005	Catalina	CSS	·	2.1 km	MPC · JPL
120368 Phillipcoulter	2005 NO_{67}	Phillipcoulter	July 3, 2005	Catalina	CSS	JUN	1.6 km	MPC · JPL
120369	2005 NW_{94}	—	July 6, 2005	Kitt Peak	Spacewatch	NYS · fast	1.2 km	MPC · JPL
120370	2005 OS_{1}	—	July 26, 2005	Palomar	NEAT	H	1.2 km	MPC · JPL
120371	2005 OB_{16}	—	July 29, 2005	Palomar	NEAT	NYS	1.4 km	MPC · JPL
120372 Bridgetburns	2005 PY	Bridgetburns	August 1, 2005	Siding Spring	SSS	·	2.4 km	MPC · JPL
120373	2005 PA_{2}	—	August 1, 2005	Siding Spring	SSS	(194)	3.2 km	MPC · JPL
120374	2005 PL_{2}	—	August 1, 2005	Siding Spring	SSS	·	4.1 km	MPC · JPL
120375 Kugel	2005 PB_{6}	Kugel	August 10, 2005	Ottmarsheim	C. Rinner	·	1.5 km	MPC · JPL
120376	2005 PY_{6}	—	August 4, 2005	Palomar	NEAT	·	1.8 km	MPC · JPL
120377	2005 PW_{14}	—	August 4, 2005	Palomar	NEAT	KOR	2.9 km	MPC · JPL
120378	2005 QL_{9}	—	August 25, 2005	Palomar	NEAT	·	2.2 km	MPC · JPL
120379	2005 QO_{9}	—	August 24, 2005	Palomar	NEAT	·	4.1 km	MPC · JPL
120380	2005 QP_{10}	—	August 25, 2005	Palomar	NEAT	NYS	2.0 km	MPC · JPL
120381	2005 QQ_{22}	—	August 27, 2005	Anderson Mesa	LONEOS	·	3.8 km	MPC · JPL
120382	2005 QD_{25}	—	August 27, 2005	Kitt Peak	Spacewatch	·	1.2 km	MPC · JPL
120383	2005 QD_{26}	—	August 27, 2005	Kitt Peak	Spacewatch	·	6.9 km	MPC · JPL
120384	2005 QU_{29}	—	August 26, 2005	Anderson Mesa	LONEOS	NYS	2.8 km	MPC · JPL
120385	2005 QB_{36}	—	August 25, 2005	Palomar	NEAT	EOS	3.1 km	MPC · JPL
120386	2005 QE_{38}	—	August 25, 2005	Palomar	NEAT	·	2.6 km	MPC · JPL
120387	2005 QL_{38}	—	August 25, 2005	Palomar	NEAT	NYS	2.0 km	MPC · JPL
120388	2005 QD_{39}	—	August 26, 2005	Anderson Mesa	LONEOS	·	4.1 km	MPC · JPL
120389	2005 QK_{79}	—	August 26, 2005	Anderson Mesa	LONEOS	EOS · fast	2.8 km	MPC · JPL
120390	2005 QL_{79}	—	August 26, 2005	Anderson Mesa	LONEOS	·	2.3 km	MPC · JPL
120391	2005 QU_{80}	—	August 28, 2005	Anderson Mesa	LONEOS	·	5.9 km	MPC · JPL
120392	2005 QF_{86}	—	August 30, 2005	Kitt Peak	Spacewatch	·	1.7 km	MPC · JPL
120393	2005 QH_{88}	—	August 30, 2005	Socorro	LINEAR	H	830 m	MPC · JPL
120394	2005 QB_{107}	—	August 27, 2005	Palomar	NEAT	·	3.5 km	MPC · JPL
120395	2005 QQ_{110}	—	August 27, 2005	Palomar	NEAT	V	1.3 km	MPC · JPL
120396	2005 QA_{112}	—	August 27, 2005	Palomar	NEAT	NYS ·	2.0 km	MPC · JPL
120397	2005 QU_{112}	—	August 27, 2005	Palomar	NEAT	·	3.9 km	MPC · JPL
120398	2005 QB_{142}	—	August 30, 2005	Socorro	LINEAR	·	1.2 km	MPC · JPL
120399	2005 QK_{156}	—	August 30, 2005	Palomar	NEAT	·	4.2 km	MPC · JPL
120400	2005 QP_{160}	—	August 28, 2005	Kitt Peak	Spacewatch	·	4.7 km	MPC · JPL

== 120401–120500 ==
back to top

Designation			Discovery			Properties		Ref
Permanent	Provisional	Named after	Date	Site	Discoverer(s)	Category	Diam.	Ref
120401	2005 RT_{6}	—	September 3, 2005	Palomar	NEAT	·	1.2 km	MPC · JPL
120402	2005 RY_{8}	—	September 8, 2005	Socorro	LINEAR	·	4.5 km	MPC · JPL
120403	2005 RE_{24}	—	September 11, 2005	Anderson Mesa	LONEOS	EUN	2.4 km	MPC · JPL
120404	2005 RH_{33}	—	September 14, 2005	Kitt Peak	Spacewatch	NYS	1.8 km	MPC · JPL
120405 Svyatylivka	2005 SQ_{4}	Svyatylivka	September 24, 2005	Andrushivka	Gerashchenko, O., Y. Ivaščenko	·	2.3 km	MPC · JPL
120406	2005 SV_{15}	—	September 26, 2005	Kitt Peak	Spacewatch	·	2.3 km	MPC · JPL
120407	2005 SV_{20}	—	September 25, 2005	Kitt Peak	Spacewatch	slow	1.2 km	MPC · JPL
120408	2005 SX_{37}	—	September 24, 2005	Kitt Peak	Spacewatch	·	4.4 km	MPC · JPL
120409	2178 P-L	—	September 24, 1960	Palomar	C. J. van Houten, I. van Houten-Groeneveld, T. Gehrels	·	1.9 km	MPC · JPL
120410	2225 P-L	—	September 24, 1960	Palomar	C. J. van Houten, I. van Houten-Groeneveld, T. Gehrels	·	2.7 km	MPC · JPL
120411	2857 P-L	—	September 24, 1960	Palomar	C. J. van Houten, I. van Houten-Groeneveld, T. Gehrels	·	2.6 km	MPC · JPL
120412	3017 P-L	—	September 24, 1960	Palomar	C. J. van Houten, I. van Houten-Groeneveld, T. Gehrels	·	5.5 km	MPC · JPL
120413	4815 P-L	—	September 24, 1960	Palomar	C. J. van Houten, I. van Houten-Groeneveld, T. Gehrels	·	1.8 km	MPC · JPL
120414	4880 P-L	—	September 24, 1960	Palomar	C. J. van Houten, I. van Houten-Groeneveld, T. Gehrels	·	2.0 km	MPC · JPL
120415	6057 P-L	—	September 24, 1960	Palomar	C. J. van Houten, I. van Houten-Groeneveld, T. Gehrels	·	2.6 km	MPC · JPL
120416	6123 P-L	—	September 24, 1960	Palomar	C. J. van Houten, I. van Houten-Groeneveld, T. Gehrels	PHO	1.6 km	MPC · JPL
120417	6264 P-L	—	September 24, 1960	Palomar	C. J. van Houten, I. van Houten-Groeneveld, T. Gehrels	·	2.8 km	MPC · JPL
120418	6633 P-L	—	September 24, 1960	Palomar	C. J. van Houten, I. van Houten-Groeneveld, T. Gehrels	·	3.3 km	MPC · JPL
120419	2308 T-1	—	March 25, 1971	Palomar	C. J. van Houten, I. van Houten-Groeneveld, T. Gehrels	·	2.0 km	MPC · JPL
120420	4133 T-1	—	March 26, 1971	Palomar	C. J. van Houten, I. van Houten-Groeneveld, T. Gehrels	·	1.2 km	MPC · JPL
120421	1604 T-2	—	September 24, 1973	Palomar	C. J. van Houten, I. van Houten-Groeneveld, T. Gehrels	·	2.1 km	MPC · JPL
120422	2023 T-2	—	September 29, 1973	Palomar	C. J. van Houten, I. van Houten-Groeneveld, T. Gehrels	·	1.3 km	MPC · JPL
120423	2061 T-2	—	September 29, 1973	Palomar	C. J. van Houten, I. van Houten-Groeneveld, T. Gehrels	·	1.2 km	MPC · JPL
120424	2099 T-2	—	September 29, 1973	Palomar	C. J. van Houten, I. van Houten-Groeneveld, T. Gehrels	·	3.2 km	MPC · JPL
120425	2113 T-2	—	September 29, 1973	Palomar	C. J. van Houten, I. van Houten-Groeneveld, T. Gehrels	·	3.5 km	MPC · JPL
120426	3080 T-2	—	September 30, 1973	Palomar	C. J. van Houten, I. van Houten-Groeneveld, T. Gehrels	·	1.7 km	MPC · JPL
120427	1155 T-3	—	October 17, 1977	Palomar	C. J. van Houten, I. van Houten-Groeneveld, T. Gehrels	·	5.2 km	MPC · JPL
120428	2128 T-3	—	October 16, 1977	Palomar	C. J. van Houten, I. van Houten-Groeneveld, T. Gehrels	·	6.6 km	MPC · JPL
120429	2225 T-3	—	October 16, 1977	Palomar	C. J. van Houten, I. van Houten-Groeneveld, T. Gehrels	·	1.9 km	MPC · JPL
120430	2303 T-3	—	October 16, 1977	Palomar	C. J. van Houten, I. van Houten-Groeneveld, T. Gehrels	·	1.4 km	MPC · JPL
120431	2448 T-3	—	October 16, 1977	Palomar	C. J. van Houten, I. van Houten-Groeneveld, T. Gehrels	MRX	2.2 km	MPC · JPL
120432	2614 T-3	—	October 16, 1977	Palomar	C. J. van Houten, I. van Houten-Groeneveld, T. Gehrels	·	6.3 km	MPC · JPL
120433	3132 T-3	—	October 16, 1977	Palomar	C. J. van Houten, I. van Houten-Groeneveld, T. Gehrels	·	5.7 km	MPC · JPL
120434	3202 T-3	—	October 16, 1977	Palomar	C. J. van Houten, I. van Houten-Groeneveld, T. Gehrels	·	7.5 km	MPC · JPL
120435	3310 T-3	—	October 16, 1977	Palomar	C. J. van Houten, I. van Houten-Groeneveld, T. Gehrels	·	4.2 km	MPC · JPL
120436	4589 T-3	—	October 16, 1977	Palomar	C. J. van Houten, I. van Houten-Groeneveld, T. Gehrels	AEO	2.8 km	MPC · JPL
120437	5101 T-3	—	October 16, 1977	Palomar	C. J. van Houten, I. van Houten-Groeneveld, T. Gehrels	·	7.6 km	MPC · JPL
120438	1978 NU	—	July 7, 1978	Palomar	Williams, J. G.	·	4.2 km	MPC · JPL
120439	1978 VJ_{4}	—	November 7, 1978	Palomar	E. F. Helin, S. J. Bus	·	2.3 km	MPC · JPL
120440	1978 VU_{9}	—	November 7, 1978	Palomar	E. F. Helin, S. J. Bus	NYS	3.9 km	MPC · JPL
120441	1979 MZ_{7}	—	June 25, 1979	Siding Spring	E. F. Helin, S. J. Bus	·	2.2 km	MPC · JPL
120442	1981 DW	—	February 28, 1981	Siding Spring	S. J. Bus	·	2.9 km	MPC · JPL
120443	1981 DK_{2}	—	February 28, 1981	Siding Spring	S. J. Bus	·	3.1 km	MPC · JPL
120444	1981 EQ_{13}	—	March 1, 1981	Siding Spring	S. J. Bus	·	4.8 km	MPC · JPL
120445	1981 EU_{16}	—	March 6, 1981	Siding Spring	S. J. Bus	ERI	3.0 km	MPC · JPL
120446	1981 EF_{21}	—	March 2, 1981	Siding Spring	S. J. Bus	fast	3.5 km	MPC · JPL
120447	1981 EP_{32}	—	March 7, 1981	Siding Spring	S. J. Bus	·	2.1 km	MPC · JPL
120448	1981 EO_{43}	—	March 3, 1981	Siding Spring	S. J. Bus	·	3.7 km	MPC · JPL
120449	1981 ED_{44}	—	March 6, 1981	Siding Spring	S. J. Bus	·	2.2 km	MPC · JPL
120450	1982 SV	—	September 20, 1982	Palomar	E. F. Helin	·	2.6 km	MPC · JPL
120451	1983 QU	—	August 30, 1983	Palomar	Gibson, J.	·	1.3 km	MPC · JPL
120452 Schombert	1988 NA	Schombert	July 6, 1988	Palomar	A. Maury	·	5.0 km	MPC · JPL
120453	1988 RE_{12}	—	September 14, 1988	Cerro Tololo	S. J. Bus	L5	12 km	MPC · JPL
120454	1988 SJ_{2}	—	September 16, 1988	Cerro Tololo	S. J. Bus	L5	17 km	MPC · JPL
120455	1989 GF_{2}	—	April 3, 1989	La Silla	E. W. Elst	·	4.0 km	MPC · JPL
120456	1989 JB	—	May 3, 1989	Palomar	E. F. Helin	PHO	2.3 km	MPC · JPL
120457	1990 QZ_{2}	—	August 28, 1990	Palomar	H. E. Holt	NYS	2.5 km	MPC · JPL
120458	1990 SN_{5}	—	September 22, 1990	La Silla	E. W. Elst	·	2.1 km	MPC · JPL
120459	1990 SQ_{6}	—	September 22, 1990	La Silla	E. W. Elst	·	2.8 km	MPC · JPL
120460 Hambach	1990 TD_{7}	Hambach	October 13, 1990	Tautenburg Observatory	F. Börngen, L. D. Schmadel	·	2.0 km	MPC · JPL
120461 Gandhi	1990 TK_{9}	Gandhi	October 10, 1990	Tautenburg Observatory	F. Börngen, L. D. Schmadel	(2076)	1.2 km	MPC · JPL
120462 Amanohashidate	1990 UE_{2}	Amanohashidate	October 26, 1990	Geisei	T. Seki	ERI	4.4 km	MPC · JPL
120463	1991 GQ_{4}	—	April 8, 1991	La Silla	E. W. Elst	·	2.6 km	MPC · JPL
120464	1991 PV_{5}	—	August 6, 1991	La Silla	E. W. Elst	·	1.3 km	MPC · JPL
120465	1991 TO_{15}	—	October 6, 1991	Palomar	Lowe, A.	·	4.5 km	MPC · JPL
120466	1991 VS_{7}	—	November 3, 1991	Kitt Peak	Spacewatch	·	3.5 km	MPC · JPL
120467	1991 VM_{9}	—	November 4, 1991	Kitt Peak	Spacewatch	·	3.1 km	MPC · JPL
120468	1991 VO_{9}	—	November 4, 1991	Kitt Peak	Spacewatch	·	2.5 km	MPC · JPL
120469	1992 DG_{9}	—	February 29, 1992	La Silla	UESAC	·	1.5 km	MPC · JPL
120470	1992 DY_{10}	—	February 29, 1992	La Silla	UESAC	·	2.1 km	MPC · JPL
120471	1992 EN_{2}	—	March 6, 1992	Kitt Peak	Spacewatch	·	1.0 km	MPC · JPL
120472	1992 ET_{7}	—	March 1, 1992	La Silla	UESAC	·	2.1 km	MPC · JPL
120473	1992 EE_{9}	—	March 2, 1992	La Silla	UESAC	·	4.3 km	MPC · JPL
120474	1992 EH_{14}	—	March 2, 1992	La Silla	UESAC	NYS	2.3 km	MPC · JPL
120475	1992 EF_{16}	—	March 1, 1992	La Silla	UESAC	(2076)	1.3 km	MPC · JPL
120476	1992 EB_{31}	—	March 1, 1992	La Silla	UESAC	·	1.6 km	MPC · JPL
120477	1992 OT_{6}	—	July 30, 1992	La Silla	E. W. Elst	·	4.3 km	MPC · JPL
120478	1992 QS	—	August 29, 1992	Palomar	E. F. Helin	PHO	2.4 km	MPC · JPL
120479	1992 RO_{4}	—	September 2, 1992	La Silla	E. W. Elst	·	2.9 km	MPC · JPL
120480	1992 RS_{7}	—	September 2, 1992	La Silla	E. W. Elst	·	2.1 km	MPC · JPL
120481 Johannwalter	1992 SP_{17}	Johannwalter	September 24, 1992	Tautenburg Observatory	F. Börngen, L. D. Schmadel	NYS	1.7 km	MPC · JPL
120482	1992 TA	—	October 2, 1992	Kitt Peak	Spacewatch	·	1.1 km	MPC · JPL
120483	1993 BW_{8}	—	January 21, 1993	Kitt Peak	Spacewatch	MIS	3.9 km	MPC · JPL
120484	1993 FR_{7}	—	March 17, 1993	La Silla	UESAC	·	3.1 km	MPC · JPL
120485	1993 FW_{7}	—	March 17, 1993	La Silla	UESAC	·	1.2 km	MPC · JPL
120486	1993 FG_{11}	—	March 17, 1993	La Silla	UESAC	·	3.8 km	MPC · JPL
120487	1993 FP_{12}	—	March 17, 1993	La Silla	UESAC	·	3.7 km	MPC · JPL
120488	1993 FZ_{16}	—	March 19, 1993	La Silla	UESAC	·	2.8 km	MPC · JPL
120489	1993 FL_{19}	—	March 17, 1993	La Silla	UESAC	·	4.2 km	MPC · JPL
120490	1993 FA_{24}	—	March 21, 1993	La Silla	UESAC	·	2.6 km	MPC · JPL
120491	1993 FM_{29}	—	March 21, 1993	La Silla	UESAC	·	1.3 km	MPC · JPL
120492	1993 FO_{30}	—	March 21, 1993	La Silla	UESAC	·	1.9 km	MPC · JPL
120493	1993 FJ_{45}	—	March 19, 1993	La Silla	UESAC	·	4.1 km	MPC · JPL
120494	1993 FZ_{45}	—	March 19, 1993	La Silla	UESAC	·	3.9 km	MPC · JPL
120495	1993 FZ_{46}	—	March 19, 1993	La Silla	UESAC	·	3.5 km	MPC · JPL
120496	1993 FB_{50}	—	March 19, 1993	La Silla	UESAC	·	1.6 km	MPC · JPL
120497	1993 FF_{50}	—	March 19, 1993	La Silla	UESAC	·	1.9 km	MPC · JPL
120498	1993 FD_{53}	—	March 17, 1993	La Silla	UESAC	·	3.3 km	MPC · JPL
120499	1993 NA	—	July 9, 1993	Stroncone	A. Vagnozzi	·	1.5 km	MPC · JPL
120500	1993 OM	—	July 24, 1993	Stroncone	A. Vagnozzi	·	3.6 km	MPC · JPL

== 120501–120600 ==
back to top

Designation			Discovery			Properties		Ref
Permanent	Provisional	Named after	Date	Site	Discoverer(s)	Category	Diam.	Ref
120501	1993 PA_{8}	—	August 15, 1993	Caussols	E. W. Elst	ERI	3.0 km	MPC · JPL
120502	1993 QD_{9}	—	August 20, 1993	La Silla	E. W. Elst	·	1.8 km	MPC · JPL
120503	1993 RW_{3}	—	September 12, 1993	Palomar	PCAS	·	2.5 km	MPC · JPL
120504	1993 SS_{10}	—	September 22, 1993	La Silla	H. Debehogne, E. W. Elst	·	2.1 km	MPC · JPL
120505	1993 ST_{10}	—	September 22, 1993	La Silla	H. Debehogne, E. W. Elst	·	2.7 km	MPC · JPL
120506	1993 TO_{1}	—	October 15, 1993	Kitami	K. Endate, K. Watanabe	PHO	3.6 km	MPC · JPL
120507	1993 TK_{14}	—	October 9, 1993	La Silla	E. W. Elst	·	1.9 km	MPC · JPL
120508	1993 TC_{16}	—	October 9, 1993	La Silla	E. W. Elst	·	3.4 km	MPC · JPL
120509	1993 TJ_{16}	—	October 9, 1993	La Silla	E. W. Elst	·	2.5 km	MPC · JPL
120510	1993 TU_{16}	—	October 9, 1993	La Silla	E. W. Elst	THM	4.0 km	MPC · JPL
120511	1993 TA_{20}	—	October 9, 1993	La Silla	E. W. Elst	·	2.3 km	MPC · JPL
120512	1993 TW_{20}	—	October 9, 1993	La Silla	E. W. Elst	MAS	1.1 km	MPC · JPL
120513	1993 TJ_{25}	—	October 9, 1993	La Silla	E. W. Elst	·	5.1 km	MPC · JPL
120514	1993 TY_{26}	—	October 9, 1993	La Silla	E. W. Elst	·	2.3 km	MPC · JPL
120515	1993 TX_{31}	—	October 9, 1993	La Silla	E. W. Elst	NYS	1.8 km	MPC · JPL
120516	1993 TY_{33}	—	October 9, 1993	La Silla	E. W. Elst	·	3.2 km	MPC · JPL
120517	1993 UU_{8}	—	October 20, 1993	La Silla	E. W. Elst	·	4.0 km	MPC · JPL
120518	1993 VC_{7}	—	November 9, 1993	Kitt Peak	Spacewatch	·	2.3 km	MPC · JPL
120519	1994 AM_{7}	—	January 7, 1994	Kitt Peak	Spacewatch	·	2.0 km	MPC · JPL
120520	1994 AW_{14}	—	January 13, 1994	Kitt Peak	Spacewatch	·	1.6 km	MPC · JPL
120521	1994 CY_{11}	—	February 7, 1994	La Silla	E. W. Elst	·	1.6 km	MPC · JPL
120522	1994 NU_{2}	—	July 11, 1994	La Silla	H. Debehogne, E. W. Elst	·	1.1 km	MPC · JPL
120523	1994 PR_{4}	—	August 10, 1994	La Silla	E. W. Elst	·	4.5 km	MPC · JPL
120524	1994 PW_{4}	—	August 10, 1994	La Silla	E. W. Elst	HYG	3.7 km	MPC · JPL
120525	1994 PV_{6}	—	August 10, 1994	La Silla	E. W. Elst	·	1.3 km	MPC · JPL
120526	1994 PB_{7}	—	August 10, 1994	La Silla	E. W. Elst	NYS	1.4 km	MPC · JPL
120527	1994 PZ_{7}	—	August 10, 1994	La Silla	E. W. Elst	(2076)	2.2 km	MPC · JPL
120528	1994 PD_{12}	—	August 10, 1994	La Silla	E. W. Elst	AGN	2.1 km	MPC · JPL
120529	1994 PH_{20}	—	August 12, 1994	La Silla	E. W. Elst	·	1.7 km	MPC · JPL
120530	1994 PJ_{21}	—	August 12, 1994	La Silla	E. W. Elst	NYS	1.6 km	MPC · JPL
120531	1994 PV_{26}	—	August 12, 1994	La Silla	E. W. Elst	·	1.8 km	MPC · JPL
120532	1994 PX_{38}	—	August 10, 1994	La Silla	E. W. Elst	·	990 m	MPC · JPL
120533	1994 PM_{39}	—	August 10, 1994	La Silla	E. W. Elst	·	1.0 km	MPC · JPL
120534	1994 RS_{5}	—	September 12, 1994	Kitt Peak	Spacewatch	·	1.2 km	MPC · JPL
120535	1994 RO_{6}	—	September 12, 1994	Kitt Peak	Spacewatch	AGN	1.8 km	MPC · JPL
120536	1994 RV_{10}	—	September 12, 1994	Kitt Peak	Spacewatch	V	1.1 km	MPC · JPL
120537	1994 RO_{29}	—	September 3, 1994	La Silla	La Silla	KOR	2.8 km	MPC · JPL
120538	1994 SP_{5}	—	September 28, 1994	Kitt Peak	Spacewatch	·	2.7 km	MPC · JPL
120539	1994 SQ_{5}	—	September 28, 1994	Kitt Peak	Spacewatch	AGN	2.2 km	MPC · JPL
120540	1994 SK_{13}	—	September 30, 1994	Xinglong	SCAP	EOS	3.4 km	MPC · JPL
120541	1994 TX_{3}	—	October 2, 1994	Kitt Peak	Spacewatch	·	1.1 km	MPC · JPL
120542	1994 TX_{8}	—	October 8, 1994	Kitt Peak	Spacewatch	·	1.4 km	MPC · JPL
120543	1994 UC_{7}	—	October 28, 1994	Kitt Peak	Spacewatch	·	1.4 km	MPC · JPL
120544	1994 WK	—	November 25, 1994	Oizumi	T. Kobayashi	H	1.4 km	MPC · JPL
120545	1994 WS	—	November 25, 1994	Oizumi	T. Kobayashi	·	3.1 km	MPC · JPL
120546	1994 WJ_{8}	—	November 28, 1994	Kitt Peak	Spacewatch	·	3.8 km	MPC · JPL
120547	1994 YJ_{3}	—	December 31, 1994	Kitt Peak	Spacewatch	NYS	1.7 km	MPC · JPL
120548	1995 BO	—	January 23, 1995	Oizumi	T. Kobayashi	·	4.3 km	MPC · JPL
120549	1995 BL_{10}	—	January 29, 1995	Kitt Peak	Spacewatch	MAS	1.2 km	MPC · JPL
120550	1995 BS_{10}	—	January 29, 1995	Kitt Peak	Spacewatch	·	1.5 km	MPC · JPL
120551	1995 BX_{10}	—	January 29, 1995	Kitt Peak	Spacewatch	·	5.2 km	MPC · JPL
120552	1995 CY_{2}	—	February 1, 1995	Kitt Peak	Spacewatch	·	5.0 km	MPC · JPL
120553	1995 CZ_{2}	—	February 1, 1995	Kitt Peak	Spacewatch	·	5.4 km	MPC · JPL
120554	1995 CW_{5}	—	February 1, 1995	Kitt Peak	Spacewatch	·	5.0 km	MPC · JPL
120555	1995 CV_{8}	—	February 4, 1995	Kitt Peak	Spacewatch	H	740 m	MPC · JPL
120556	1995 CG_{10}	—	February 4, 1995	Kitt Peak	Spacewatch	NYS	2.1 km	MPC · JPL
120557	1995 DY_{3}	—	February 21, 1995	Kitt Peak	Spacewatch	·	2.5 km	MPC · JPL
120558	1995 DN_{4}	—	February 21, 1995	Kitt Peak	Spacewatch	·	4.4 km	MPC · JPL
120559	1995 EB_{2}	—	March 1, 1995	Kitt Peak	Spacewatch	NYS	2.1 km	MPC · JPL
120560	1995 EZ_{4}	—	March 2, 1995	Kitt Peak	Spacewatch	·	1.6 km	MPC · JPL
120561	1995 EJ_{5}	—	March 2, 1995	Kitt Peak	Spacewatch	·	5.6 km	MPC · JPL
120562	1995 FP_{4}	—	March 23, 1995	Kitt Peak	Spacewatch	MAS	1.4 km	MPC · JPL
120563	1995 FY_{4}	—	March 23, 1995	Kitt Peak	Spacewatch	·	2.5 km	MPC · JPL
120564	1995 FD_{5}	—	March 23, 1995	Kitt Peak	Spacewatch	NYS	1.8 km	MPC · JPL
120565	1995 FX_{5}	—	March 23, 1995	Kitt Peak	Spacewatch	·	1.8 km	MPC · JPL
120566	1995 FB_{6}	—	March 23, 1995	Kitt Peak	Spacewatch	MAS	970 m	MPC · JPL
120567	1995 FU_{6}	—	March 23, 1995	Kitt Peak	Spacewatch	THM	3.7 km	MPC · JPL
120568	1995 FX_{12}	—	March 27, 1995	Kitt Peak	Spacewatch	·	2.1 km	MPC · JPL
120569 Huangrunqian	1995 FU_{20}	Huangrunqian	March 24, 1995	Xinglong	SCAP	LIX	7.0 km	MPC · JPL
120570	1995 GK_{2}	—	April 2, 1995	Kitt Peak	Spacewatch	·	3.7 km	MPC · JPL
120571	1995 HF_{1}	—	April 24, 1995	Kitt Peak	Spacewatch	·	1.5 km	MPC · JPL
120572	1995 MQ_{4}	—	June 29, 1995	Kitt Peak	Spacewatch	·	4.2 km	MPC · JPL
120573	1995 MU_{7}	—	June 25, 1995	Kitt Peak	Spacewatch	V	1.1 km	MPC · JPL
120574	1995 OB_{10}	—	July 19, 1995	Xinglong	SCAP	·	1.4 km	MPC · JPL
120575	1995 QD	—	August 17, 1995	Colleverde	V. S. Casulli	·	3.2 km	MPC · JPL
120576	1995 QK_{2}	—	August 25, 1995	Nachi-Katsuura	Y. Shimizu, T. Urata	·	4.0 km	MPC · JPL
120577	1995 QU_{5}	—	August 22, 1995	Kitt Peak	Spacewatch	·	1.6 km	MPC · JPL
120578	1995 QV_{12}	—	August 22, 1995	Kitt Peak	Spacewatch	·	3.9 km	MPC · JPL
120579	1995 QB_{15}	—	August 28, 1995	Kitt Peak	Spacewatch	·	1.9 km	MPC · JPL
120580	1995 SF	—	September 17, 1995	Kleť	Z. Moravec	·	1.0 km	MPC · JPL
120581	1995 SN_{7}	—	September 17, 1995	Kitt Peak	Spacewatch	·	2.1 km	MPC · JPL
120582	1995 SB_{12}	—	September 18, 1995	Kitt Peak	Spacewatch	·	2.8 km	MPC · JPL
120583	1995 SS_{15}	—	September 18, 1995	Kitt Peak	Spacewatch	·	3.1 km	MPC · JPL
120584	1995 SU_{15}	—	September 18, 1995	Kitt Peak	Spacewatch	·	1.8 km	MPC · JPL
120585	1995 SA_{24}	—	September 19, 1995	Kitt Peak	Spacewatch	·	3.6 km	MPC · JPL
120586	1995 SE_{25}	—	September 19, 1995	Kitt Peak	Spacewatch	·	2.8 km	MPC · JPL
120587	1995 SM_{31}	—	September 21, 1995	Kitt Peak	Spacewatch	·	5.6 km	MPC · JPL
120588	1995 SK_{34}	—	September 22, 1995	Kitt Peak	Spacewatch	·	3.2 km	MPC · JPL
120589	1995 SP_{34}	—	September 22, 1995	Kitt Peak	Spacewatch	KOR	1.7 km	MPC · JPL
120590	1995 ST_{42}	—	September 25, 1995	Kitt Peak	Spacewatch	·	2.9 km	MPC · JPL
120591	1995 SE_{51}	—	September 26, 1995	Kitt Peak	Spacewatch	·	3.2 km	MPC · JPL
120592	1995 SM_{52}	—	September 29, 1995	Kitt Peak	Spacewatch	AGN	1.8 km	MPC · JPL
120593	1995 SR_{62}	—	September 25, 1995	Kitt Peak	Spacewatch	·	2.3 km	MPC · JPL
120594	1995 SD_{72}	—	September 19, 1995	Kitt Peak	Spacewatch	·	2.6 km	MPC · JPL
120595	1995 TK_{6}	—	October 15, 1995	Kitt Peak	Spacewatch	·	2.9 km	MPC · JPL
120596	1995 UM_{12}	—	October 17, 1995	Kitt Peak	Spacewatch	·	2.9 km	MPC · JPL
120597	1995 UW_{14}	—	October 17, 1995	Kitt Peak	Spacewatch	AGN	1.9 km	MPC · JPL
120598	1995 UU_{17}	—	October 18, 1995	Kitt Peak	Spacewatch	·	2.7 km	MPC · JPL
120599	1995 UN_{35}	—	October 21, 1995	Kitt Peak	Spacewatch	·	3.1 km	MPC · JPL
120600	1995 UE_{56}	—	October 23, 1995	Kitt Peak	Spacewatch	·	1.1 km	MPC · JPL

== 120601–120700 ==
back to top

Designation			Discovery			Properties		Ref
Permanent	Provisional	Named after	Date	Site	Discoverer(s)	Category	Diam.	Ref
120601	1995 UN_{73}	—	October 20, 1995	Kitt Peak	Spacewatch	·	1.1 km	MPC · JPL
120602	1995 VZ_{1}	—	November 11, 1995	Xinglong	SCAP	NEM	4.3 km	MPC · JPL
120603	1995 VN_{4}	—	November 14, 1995	Kitt Peak	Spacewatch	·	2.5 km	MPC · JPL
120604	1995 VF_{7}	—	November 14, 1995	Kitt Peak	Spacewatch	·	1.7 km	MPC · JPL
120605	1995 VX_{7}	—	November 14, 1995	Kitt Peak	Spacewatch	AST	3.7 km	MPC · JPL
120606	1995 VH_{11}	—	November 15, 1995	Kitt Peak	Spacewatch	·	3.1 km	MPC · JPL
120607	1995 VH_{17}	—	November 15, 1995	Kitt Peak	Spacewatch	·	1.4 km	MPC · JPL
120608	1995 WV_{11}	—	November 16, 1995	Kitt Peak	Spacewatch	·	3.3 km	MPC · JPL
120609	1995 WW_{12}	—	November 16, 1995	Kitt Peak	Spacewatch	·	2.7 km	MPC · JPL
120610	1995 WF_{15}	—	November 17, 1995	Kitt Peak	Spacewatch	·	1.2 km	MPC · JPL
120611	1995 WB_{17}	—	November 17, 1995	Kitt Peak	Spacewatch	AGN	1.7 km	MPC · JPL
120612	1995 WF_{18}	—	November 17, 1995	Kitt Peak	Spacewatch	·	2.4 km	MPC · JPL
120613	1995 WV_{19}	—	November 17, 1995	Kitt Peak	Spacewatch	·	4.0 km	MPC · JPL
120614	1995 WZ_{24}	—	November 18, 1995	Kitt Peak	Spacewatch	V	1.1 km	MPC · JPL
120615	1995 WO_{27}	—	November 19, 1995	Kitt Peak	Spacewatch	·	3.9 km	MPC · JPL
120616	1995 WE_{33}	—	November 20, 1995	Kitt Peak	Spacewatch	·	4.4 km	MPC · JPL
120617	1995 XE_{4}	—	December 14, 1995	Kitt Peak	Spacewatch	·	3.1 km	MPC · JPL
120618	1995 YD_{5}	—	December 16, 1995	Kitt Peak	Spacewatch	T_{j} (2.99) · 3:2 · SHU	9.7 km	MPC · JPL
120619	1995 YU_{10}	—	December 18, 1995	Kitt Peak	Spacewatch	BAP	1.6 km	MPC · JPL
120620	1995 YT_{20}	—	December 25, 1995	Kitt Peak	Spacewatch	·	4.1 km	MPC · JPL
120621	1996 AS_{13}	—	January 15, 1996	Kitt Peak	Spacewatch	·	3.5 km	MPC · JPL
120622	1996 AD_{14}	—	January 15, 1996	Kitt Peak	Spacewatch	V	1.2 km	MPC · JPL
120623	1996 BM_{6}	—	January 18, 1996	Kitt Peak	Spacewatch	·	1.6 km	MPC · JPL
120624	1996 EM_{2}	—	March 11, 1996	Haleakala	AMOS	·	3.8 km	MPC · JPL
120625	1996 ES_{6}	—	March 11, 1996	Kitt Peak	Spacewatch	(2076)	1.4 km	MPC · JPL
120626	1996 EE_{8}	—	March 11, 1996	Kitt Peak	Spacewatch	·	3.4 km	MPC · JPL
120627	1996 EM_{9}	—	March 12, 1996	Kitt Peak	Spacewatch	THM	3.3 km	MPC · JPL
120628	1996 FO_{21}	—	March 24, 1996	La Silla	E. W. Elst	·	3.7 km	MPC · JPL
120629	1996 GC_{8}	—	April 12, 1996	Kitt Peak	Spacewatch	·	2.0 km	MPC · JPL
120630	1996 GL_{8}	—	April 13, 1996	Kitt Peak	Spacewatch	·	5.4 km	MPC · JPL
120631	1996 GX_{9}	—	April 13, 1996	Kitt Peak	Spacewatch	THM	5.1 km	MPC · JPL
120632	1996 GC_{10}	—	April 13, 1996	Kitt Peak	Spacewatch	EOS	4.5 km	MPC · JPL
120633	1996 GZ_{11}	—	April 15, 1996	Kitt Peak	Spacewatch	·	2.2 km	MPC · JPL
120634	1996 GP_{14}	—	April 12, 1996	Kitt Peak	Spacewatch	MAS	1.1 km	MPC · JPL
120635	1996 HE_{16}	—	April 18, 1996	La Silla	E. W. Elst	·	4.9 km	MPC · JPL
120636	1996 HW_{17}	—	April 18, 1996	La Silla	E. W. Elst	·	5.8 km	MPC · JPL
120637	1996 JC_{12}	—	May 9, 1996	Kitt Peak	Spacewatch	·	1.6 km	MPC · JPL
120638	1996 JC_{13}	—	May 11, 1996	Kitt Peak	Spacewatch	·	1.6 km	MPC · JPL
120639	1996 KJ_{3}	—	May 24, 1996	Xinglong	SCAP	·	4.3 km	MPC · JPL
120640	1996 PN	—	August 9, 1996	Macquarie	R. H. McNaught, Child, J. B.	PHO	5.1 km	MPC · JPL
120641	1996 PH_{4}	—	August 10, 1996	Haleakala	NEAT	(5)	2.3 km	MPC · JPL
120642	1996 PY_{5}	—	August 10, 1996	Haleakala	NEAT	MAS	1.4 km	MPC · JPL
120643 Rudimandl	1996 RU	Rudimandl	September 10, 1996	Kleť	M. Tichý	·	2.1 km	MPC · JPL
120644	1996 RM_{3}	—	September 11, 1996	Haleakala	NEAT	·	3.5 km	MPC · JPL
120645	1996 RA_{10}	—	September 7, 1996	Kitt Peak	Spacewatch	·	1.4 km	MPC · JPL
120646	1996 RE_{17}	—	September 13, 1996	Kitt Peak	Spacewatch	NYS	2.2 km	MPC · JPL
120647	1996 SZ_{3}	—	September 21, 1996	Kitt Peak	Spacewatch	·	2.7 km	MPC · JPL
120648	1996 SE_{4}	—	September 19, 1996	Xinglong	SCAP	KRM	5.3 km	MPC · JPL
120649	1996 TZ_{3}	—	October 8, 1996	Haleakala	NEAT	NYS	2.3 km	MPC · JPL
120650	1996 TV_{7}	—	October 11, 1996	Haleakala	NEAT	EUN	2.7 km	MPC · JPL
120651	1996 TA_{10}	—	October 15, 1996	Sudbury	D. di Cicco	·	2.8 km	MPC · JPL
120652	1996 TF_{16}	—	October 4, 1996	Kitt Peak	Spacewatch	·	2.4 km	MPC · JPL
120653	1996 TB_{19}	—	October 4, 1996	Kitt Peak	Spacewatch	·	2.6 km	MPC · JPL
120654	1996 TU_{26}	—	October 7, 1996	Kitt Peak	Spacewatch	·	2.9 km	MPC · JPL
120655	1996 TZ_{29}	—	October 7, 1996	Kitt Peak	Spacewatch	·	2.5 km	MPC · JPL
120656	1996 TV_{45}	—	October 7, 1996	Kitt Peak	Spacewatch	·	1.3 km	MPC · JPL
120657	1996 UP_{2}	—	October 17, 1996	Kitt Peak	Spacewatch	·	1.9 km	MPC · JPL
120658	1996 UQ_{2}	—	October 17, 1996	Kitt Peak	Spacewatch	·	1.3 km	MPC · JPL
120659	1996 UX_{2}	—	October 18, 1996	Kitt Peak	Spacewatch	·	3.0 km	MPC · JPL
120660	1996 VA	—	November 1, 1996	Prescott	P. G. Comba	·	3.3 km	MPC · JPL
120661	1996 VZ_{2}	—	November 11, 1996	Sudbury	D. di Cicco	GEF	2.3 km	MPC · JPL
120662	1996 VK_{9}	—	November 3, 1996	Kitt Peak	Spacewatch	T_{j} (2.97) · HIL · 3:2	9.3 km	MPC · JPL
120663	1996 VN_{15}	—	November 5, 1996	Kitt Peak	Spacewatch	AST	2.7 km	MPC · JPL
120664	1996 VR_{15}	—	November 5, 1996	Kitt Peak	Spacewatch	·	2.0 km	MPC · JPL
120665	1996 XT	—	December 1, 1996	Chichibu	N. Satō	·	3.6 km	MPC · JPL
120666	1996 XL_{4}	—	December 6, 1996	Kitt Peak	Spacewatch	·	4.3 km	MPC · JPL
120667	1996 XB_{8}	—	December 1, 1996	Kitt Peak	Spacewatch	TEL	2.3 km	MPC · JPL
120668	1996 XM_{8}	—	December 6, 1996	Kitt Peak	Spacewatch	·	2.0 km	MPC · JPL
120669	1996 XT_{13}	—	December 4, 1996	Kitt Peak	Spacewatch	·	2.5 km	MPC · JPL
120670	1996 XM_{21}	—	December 8, 1996	Kitt Peak	Spacewatch	·	1.9 km	MPC · JPL
120671	1996 XT_{25}	—	December 12, 1996	Oohira	T. Urata	EUN	3.3 km	MPC · JPL
120672	1997 AK	—	January 2, 1997	Oizumi	T. Kobayashi	·	1.4 km	MPC · JPL
120673	1997 AA_{6}	—	January 2, 1997	Xinglong	SCAP	EUN	2.3 km	MPC · JPL
120674	1997 AV_{7}	—	January 2, 1997	Kitt Peak	Spacewatch	AGN	1.8 km	MPC · JPL
120675	1997 AO_{10}	—	January 9, 1997	Kitt Peak	Spacewatch	·	2.8 km	MPC · JPL
120676	1997 AO_{16}	—	January 14, 1997	Kleť	Kleť	·	2.2 km	MPC · JPL
120677	1997 AW_{20}	—	January 11, 1997	Kitt Peak	Spacewatch	·	1.2 km	MPC · JPL
120678	1997 BB_{4}	—	January 31, 1997	Kitt Peak	Spacewatch	·	2.9 km	MPC · JPL
120679	1997 BW_{4}	—	January 29, 1997	Sormano	A. Testa, P. Chiavenna	·	3.2 km	MPC · JPL
120680	1997 BT_{5}	—	January 31, 1997	Prescott	P. G. Comba	KOR	2.5 km	MPC · JPL
120681	1997 BB_{6}	—	January 31, 1997	Kitt Peak	Spacewatch	·	3.7 km	MPC · JPL
120682	1997 CZ_{1}	—	February 1, 1997	Kitt Peak	Spacewatch	·	4.6 km	MPC · JPL
120683	1997 CJ_{6}	—	February 6, 1997	Modra	A. Galád, Pravda, A.	·	3.3 km	MPC · JPL
120684	1997 CA_{9}	—	February 1, 1997	Kitt Peak	Spacewatch	·	2.4 km	MPC · JPL
120685	1997 CM_{9}	—	February 1, 1997	Kitt Peak	Spacewatch	·	3.1 km	MPC · JPL
120686	1997 CY_{10}	—	February 3, 1997	Kitt Peak	Spacewatch	·	1.2 km	MPC · JPL
120687	1997 CJ_{11}	—	February 3, 1997	Kitt Peak	Spacewatch	GEF	1.7 km	MPC · JPL
120688	1997 CM_{23}	—	February 7, 1997	Kitt Peak	Spacewatch	·	1.4 km	MPC · JPL
120689	1997 EG_{5}	—	March 4, 1997	Kitt Peak	Spacewatch	·	4.2 km	MPC · JPL
120690	1997 EE_{9}	—	March 2, 1997	Kitt Peak	Spacewatch	·	3.3 km	MPC · JPL
120691	1997 EZ_{28}	—	March 10, 1997	Kitt Peak	Spacewatch	KOR	2.1 km	MPC · JPL
120692	1997 EA_{37}	—	March 5, 1997	Socorro	LINEAR	·	4.3 km	MPC · JPL
120693	1997 GN_{1}	—	April 8, 1997	Ondřejov	P. Pravec	·	3.0 km	MPC · JPL
120694	1997 GV_{5}	—	April 2, 1997	Socorro	LINEAR	·	2.7 km	MPC · JPL
120695	1997 GU_{40}	—	April 7, 1997	La Silla	E. W. Elst	·	1.0 km	MPC · JPL
120696	1997 HH	—	April 28, 1997	Kitt Peak	Spacewatch	THM	3.5 km	MPC · JPL
120697	1997 HP_{1}	—	April 28, 1997	Kitt Peak	Spacewatch	·	3.9 km	MPC · JPL
120698	1997 HG_{13}	—	April 30, 1997	Socorro	LINEAR	NYS	2.2 km	MPC · JPL
120699	1997 HM_{14}	—	April 27, 1997	Kitt Peak	Spacewatch	AGN	2.0 km	MPC · JPL
120700	1997 HO_{16}	—	April 30, 1997	Kitt Peak	Spacewatch	AGN	2.0 km	MPC · JPL

== 120701–120800 ==
back to top

Designation			Discovery			Properties		Ref
Permanent	Provisional	Named after	Date	Site	Discoverer(s)	Category	Diam.	Ref
120701	1997 HR_{16}	—	April 30, 1997	Kitt Peak	Spacewatch	·	2.8 km	MPC · JPL
120702	1997 JC_{5}	—	May 8, 1997	Kitt Peak	Spacewatch	·	5.6 km	MPC · JPL
120703	1997 JM_{13}	—	May 3, 1997	La Silla	E. W. Elst	·	1.1 km	MPC · JPL
120704	1997 KO_{3}	—	May 31, 1997	Kitt Peak	Spacewatch	·	4.1 km	MPC · JPL
120705	1997 LH_{14}	—	June 8, 1997	La Silla	E. W. Elst	NYS	2.1 km	MPC · JPL
120706	1997 MD_{1}	—	June 26, 1997	Kitt Peak	Spacewatch	·	5.8 km	MPC · JPL
120707	1997 ML_{1}	—	June 27, 1997	Kitt Peak	Spacewatch	·	5.6 km	MPC · JPL
120708	1997 MA_{2}	—	June 26, 1997	Kitt Peak	Spacewatch	·	1.8 km	MPC · JPL
120709	1997 MC_{5}	—	June 29, 1997	Socorro	LINEAR	·	2.1 km	MPC · JPL
120710	1997 MX_{8}	—	June 29, 1997	Kitt Peak	Spacewatch	·	1.8 km	MPC · JPL
120711	1997 MC_{9}	—	June 30, 1997	Kitt Peak	Spacewatch	·	4.6 km	MPC · JPL
120712	1997 MH_{9}	—	June 30, 1997	Kitt Peak	Spacewatch	·	4.4 km	MPC · JPL
120713	1997 QO_{2}	—	August 30, 1997	Haleakala	NEAT	PHO	4.2 km	MPC · JPL
120714	1997 SQ_{3}	—	September 25, 1997	Rand	G. R. Viscome	·	1.5 km	MPC · JPL
120715	1997 SG_{4}	—	September 27, 1997	Oizumi	T. Kobayashi	·	3.3 km	MPC · JPL
120716	1997 SM_{5}	—	September 28, 1997	Needville	W. G. Dillon, R. Pepper	·	1.7 km	MPC · JPL
120717	1997 SG_{6}	—	September 23, 1997	Kitt Peak	Spacewatch	·	1.9 km	MPC · JPL
120718	1997 SF_{8}	—	September 23, 1997	Kitt Peak	Spacewatch	·	1.8 km	MPC · JPL
120719	1997 SQ_{11}	—	September 27, 1997	Kitt Peak	Spacewatch	·	4.7 km	MPC · JPL
120720	1997 SG_{12}	—	September 27, 1997	Kitt Peak	Spacewatch	·	2.0 km	MPC · JPL
120721	1997 SP_{13}	—	September 28, 1997	Kitt Peak	Spacewatch	·	1.6 km	MPC · JPL
120722	1997 SV_{13}	—	September 28, 1997	Kitt Peak	Spacewatch	·	6.4 km	MPC · JPL
120723	1997 SA_{16}	—	September 27, 1997	Caussols	ODAS	(5)	2.6 km	MPC · JPL
120724	1997 SV_{16}	—	September 28, 1997	Kitt Peak	Spacewatch	NYS	1.5 km	MPC · JPL
120725	1997 SL_{18}	—	September 28, 1997	Kitt Peak	Spacewatch	·	1.7 km	MPC · JPL
120726	1997 SR_{30}	—	September 25, 1997	Uccle	T. Pauwels	NYS	2.5 km	MPC · JPL
120727	1997 SF_{32}	—	September 27, 1997	Bergisch Gladbach	W. Bickel	·	6.1 km	MPC · JPL
120728	1997 SG_{32}	—	September 28, 1997	Haleakala	AMOS	·	2.4 km	MPC · JPL
120729	1997 SH_{32}	—	September 28, 1997	Haleakala	AMOS	NYS	1.9 km	MPC · JPL
120730 Zhouyouyuan	1997 SN_{33}	Zhouyouyuan	September 26, 1997	Xinglong	SCAP	NYS	1.4 km	MPC · JPL
120731	1997 TY_{2}	—	October 3, 1997	Caussols	ODAS	NYS	2.3 km	MPC · JPL
120732	1997 TS_{3}	—	October 3, 1997	Caussols	ODAS	·	2.0 km	MPC · JPL
120733	1997 TN_{5}	—	October 2, 1997	Caussols	ODAS	MAS	1.8 km	MPC · JPL
120734	1997 TH_{9}	—	October 2, 1997	Kitt Peak	Spacewatch	·	2.0 km	MPC · JPL
120735 Ogawakiyoshi	1997 TD_{11}	Ogawakiyoshi	October 7, 1997	Yatsuka	H. Abe	MAS	1.9 km	MPC · JPL
120736	1997 TA_{17}	—	October 9, 1997	Ondřejov	L. Kotková	·	2.6 km	MPC · JPL
120737	1997 TL_{17}	—	October 8, 1997	Oizumi	T. Kobayashi	·	1.9 km	MPC · JPL
120738	1997 TO_{17}	—	October 2, 1997	Haleakala	AMOS	·	1.4 km	MPC · JPL
120739	1997 TE_{26}	—	October 11, 1997	Xinglong	SCAP	·	3.6 km	MPC · JPL
120740	1997 UE_{16}	—	October 23, 1997	Kitt Peak	Spacewatch	·	1.8 km	MPC · JPL
120741 Iijimayuichi	1997 UJ_{22}	Iijimayuichi	October 26, 1997	Chichibu	N. Satō	·	2.1 km	MPC · JPL
120742	1997 VW_{1}	—	November 4, 1997	Ondřejov	L. Kotková	NYS · fast	1.4 km	MPC · JPL
120743	1997 VN_{5}	—	November 8, 1997	Oizumi	T. Kobayashi	RAF	1.6 km	MPC · JPL
120744	1997 WX_{4}	—	November 21, 1997	Kitt Peak	Spacewatch	·	1.2 km	MPC · JPL
120745	1997 WR_{9}	—	November 21, 1997	Kitt Peak	Spacewatch	·	1.6 km	MPC · JPL
120746	1997 WC_{10}	—	November 21, 1997	Kitt Peak	Spacewatch	NYS	2.1 km	MPC · JPL
120747	1997 WE_{11}	—	November 22, 1997	Kitt Peak	Spacewatch	MAS	1.1 km	MPC · JPL
120748	1997 WB_{12}	—	November 22, 1997	Kitt Peak	Spacewatch	NYS	1.8 km	MPC · JPL
120749	1997 WR_{12}	—	November 23, 1997	Kitt Peak	Spacewatch	·	1.6 km	MPC · JPL
120750	1997 WX_{19}	—	November 24, 1997	Kitt Peak	Spacewatch	MAR	2.0 km	MPC · JPL
120751	1997 WH_{21}	—	November 30, 1997	Oizumi	T. Kobayashi	·	3.3 km	MPC · JPL
120752	1997 WW_{24}	—	November 28, 1997	Kitt Peak	Spacewatch	·	2.0 km	MPC · JPL
120753	1997 WW_{28}	—	November 29, 1997	Kitt Peak	Spacewatch	·	1.3 km	MPC · JPL
120754	1997 WL_{31}	—	November 29, 1997	Socorro	LINEAR	·	2.2 km	MPC · JPL
120755	1997 WH_{39}	—	November 29, 1997	Socorro	LINEAR	·	2.2 km	MPC · JPL
120756	1997 XN_{7}	—	December 5, 1997	Caussols	ODAS	·	1.3 km	MPC · JPL
120757	1997 YS_{7}	—	December 21, 1997	Kitt Peak	Spacewatch	NYS	2.1 km	MPC · JPL
120758	1997 YO_{13}	—	December 29, 1997	Kitt Peak	Spacewatch	·	2.7 km	MPC · JPL
120759	1997 YY_{17}	—	December 31, 1997	Kitt Peak	Spacewatch	·	2.7 km	MPC · JPL
120760	1997 YQ_{18}	—	December 29, 1997	Kitt Peak	Spacewatch	·	2.3 km	MPC · JPL
120761	1998 AX_{1}	—	January 1, 1998	Kitt Peak	Spacewatch	3:2 · SHU	7.6 km	MPC · JPL
120762	1998 AQ_{4}	—	January 6, 1998	Kitt Peak	Spacewatch	·	3.4 km	MPC · JPL
120763	1998 BW_{5}	—	January 22, 1998	Kitt Peak	Spacewatch	·	3.3 km	MPC · JPL
120764	1998 BV_{8}	—	January 18, 1998	Xinglong	SCAP	·	4.3 km	MPC · JPL
120765	1998 BD_{13}	—	January 23, 1998	Socorro	LINEAR	·	4.4 km	MPC · JPL
120766	1998 BA_{16}	—	January 26, 1998	Haleakala	NEAT	slow	6.2 km	MPC · JPL
120767	1998 BS_{26}	—	January 27, 1998	Modra	L. Kornoš, P. Kolény	·	2.3 km	MPC · JPL
120768	1998 BM_{29}	—	January 25, 1998	Kitt Peak	Spacewatch	MAS	1.7 km	MPC · JPL
120769	1998 CM_{1}	—	February 6, 1998	Xinglong	SCAP	H	1.0 km	MPC · JPL
120770	1998 DB_{7}	—	February 17, 1998	Kitt Peak	Spacewatch	·	2.8 km	MPC · JPL
120771	1998 DD_{8}	—	February 21, 1998	Xinglong	SCAP	·	5.4 km	MPC · JPL
120772	1998 DM_{15}	—	February 22, 1998	Haleakala	NEAT	·	3.0 km	MPC · JPL
120773	1998 DA_{19}	—	February 24, 1998	Kitt Peak	Spacewatch	·	2.0 km	MPC · JPL
120774	1998 DQ_{20}	—	February 24, 1998	Xinglong	SCAP	·	2.8 km	MPC · JPL
120775	1998 DB_{23}	—	February 24, 1998	Kitt Peak	Spacewatch	·	2.9 km	MPC · JPL
120776	1998 DQ_{23}	—	February 28, 1998	Caussols	ODAS	H	1.3 km	MPC · JPL
120777	1998 DZ_{25}	—	February 23, 1998	Kitt Peak	Spacewatch	·	2.3 km	MPC · JPL
120778	1998 DQ_{34}	—	February 27, 1998	La Silla	E. W. Elst	·	3.2 km	MPC · JPL
120779	1998 ET_{8}	—	March 5, 1998	Xinglong	SCAP	·	4.4 km	MPC · JPL
120780	1998 EY_{10}	—	March 1, 1998	La Silla	E. W. Elst	·	2.7 km	MPC · JPL
120781	1998 EL_{11}	—	March 1, 1998	La Silla	E. W. Elst	·	2.9 km	MPC · JPL
120782	1998 EM_{12}	—	March 1, 1998	La Silla	E. W. Elst	HNS	2.9 km	MPC · JPL
120783	1998 EN_{19}	—	March 3, 1998	La Silla	E. W. Elst	·	2.1 km	MPC · JPL
120784	1998 EY_{20}	—	March 3, 1998	La Silla	E. W. Elst	·	2.7 km	MPC · JPL
120785	1998 FT_{3}	—	March 20, 1998	Kitt Peak	Spacewatch	·	1.6 km	MPC · JPL
120786	1998 FO_{7}	—	March 20, 1998	Kitt Peak	Spacewatch	·	1.8 km	MPC · JPL
120787	1998 FS_{12}	—	March 20, 1998	Xinglong	SCAP	·	2.9 km	MPC · JPL
120788	1998 FD_{16}	—	March 26, 1998	Kleť	Kleť	ADE	4.9 km	MPC · JPL
120789	1998 FQ_{24}	—	March 20, 1998	Socorro	LINEAR	·	3.1 km	MPC · JPL
120790	1998 FX_{25}	—	March 20, 1998	Socorro	LINEAR	(5)	2.0 km	MPC · JPL
120791	1998 FP_{28}	—	March 20, 1998	Socorro	LINEAR	·	1.8 km	MPC · JPL
120792	1998 FE_{35}	—	March 20, 1998	Socorro	LINEAR	·	2.0 km	MPC · JPL
120793	1998 FT_{37}	—	March 20, 1998	Socorro	LINEAR	·	3.2 km	MPC · JPL
120794	1998 FX_{53}	—	March 20, 1998	Socorro	LINEAR	·	1.8 km	MPC · JPL
120795	1998 FR_{54}	—	March 20, 1998	Socorro	LINEAR	·	1.6 km	MPC · JPL
120796	1998 FF_{58}	—	March 20, 1998	Socorro	LINEAR	·	3.7 km	MPC · JPL
120797	1998 FW_{60}	—	March 20, 1998	Socorro	LINEAR	·	2.4 km	MPC · JPL
120798	1998 FO_{63}	—	March 20, 1998	Socorro	LINEAR	V	1.5 km	MPC · JPL
120799	1998 FA_{64}	—	March 20, 1998	Socorro	LINEAR	·	2.1 km	MPC · JPL
120800	1998 FN_{68}	—	March 20, 1998	Socorro	LINEAR	·	1.8 km	MPC · JPL

== 120801–120900 ==
back to top

Designation			Discovery			Properties		Ref
Permanent	Provisional	Named after	Date	Site	Discoverer(s)	Category	Diam.	Ref
120801	1998 FU_{72}	—	March 30, 1998	Kleť	Kleť	·	2.9 km	MPC · JPL
120802	1998 FV_{94}	—	March 24, 1998	Socorro	LINEAR	·	2.6 km	MPC · JPL
120803	1998 FY_{114}	—	March 31, 1998	Socorro	LINEAR	·	2.4 km	MPC · JPL
120804	1998 FJ_{125}	—	March 24, 1998	Socorro	LINEAR	·	1.5 km	MPC · JPL
120805	1998 FF_{138}	—	March 28, 1998	Socorro	LINEAR	·	3.5 km	MPC · JPL
120806	1998 GE_{6}	—	April 2, 1998	Socorro	LINEAR	EUN	2.1 km	MPC · JPL
120807	1998 HK	—	April 18, 1998	Socorro	LINEAR	H	970 m	MPC · JPL
120808	1998 HL_{7}	—	April 23, 1998	Socorro	LINEAR	H	1.3 km	MPC · JPL
120809	1998 HU_{7}	—	April 21, 1998	Višnjan Observatory	Višnjan	·	1.8 km	MPC · JPL
120810	1998 HA_{12}	—	April 19, 1998	Kitt Peak	Spacewatch	·	2.6 km	MPC · JPL
120811	1998 HT_{17}	—	April 18, 1998	Socorro	LINEAR	·	2.0 km	MPC · JPL
120812	1998 HZ_{24}	—	April 17, 1998	Kitt Peak	Spacewatch	·	4.6 km	MPC · JPL
120813	1998 HW_{28}	—	April 27, 1998	Kitt Peak	Spacewatch	·	2.9 km	MPC · JPL
120814	1998 HW_{37}	—	April 20, 1998	Socorro	LINEAR	·	2.0 km	MPC · JPL
120815	1998 HB_{42}	—	April 24, 1998	Kitt Peak	Spacewatch	·	2.2 km	MPC · JPL
120816	1998 HN_{42}	—	April 30, 1998	Kleť	Kleť	EUN	2.7 km	MPC · JPL
120817	1998 HW_{55}	—	April 21, 1998	Socorro	LINEAR	·	2.5 km	MPC · JPL
120818	1998 HA_{68}	—	April 21, 1998	Socorro	LINEAR	·	2.5 km	MPC · JPL
120819	1998 HA_{87}	—	April 21, 1998	Socorro	LINEAR	·	2.6 km	MPC · JPL
120820	1998 HL_{89}	—	April 21, 1998	Socorro	LINEAR	·	4.4 km	MPC · JPL
120821	1998 HY_{94}	—	April 21, 1998	Socorro	LINEAR	JUN	2.4 km	MPC · JPL
120822	1998 HK_{96}	—	April 21, 1998	Socorro	LINEAR	·	4.0 km	MPC · JPL
120823	1998 HZ_{107}	—	April 23, 1998	Socorro	LINEAR	·	4.7 km	MPC · JPL
120824	1998 HG_{109}	—	April 23, 1998	Socorro	LINEAR	·	3.2 km	MPC · JPL
120825	1998 HE_{111}	—	April 23, 1998	Socorro	LINEAR	·	1.8 km	MPC · JPL
120826	1998 HH_{112}	—	April 23, 1998	Socorro	LINEAR	EUN	2.6 km	MPC · JPL
120827	1998 HZ_{115}	—	April 23, 1998	Socorro	LINEAR	·	4.5 km	MPC · JPL
120828	1998 HE_{122}	—	April 23, 1998	Socorro	LINEAR	JUN	3.6 km	MPC · JPL
120829	1998 HV_{124}	—	April 23, 1998	Socorro	LINEAR	·	3.4 km	MPC · JPL
120830	1998 HB_{130}	—	April 19, 1998	Socorro	LINEAR	·	3.5 km	MPC · JPL
120831	1998 HN_{130}	—	April 19, 1998	Socorro	LINEAR	EUN	2.0 km	MPC · JPL
120832	1998 HQ_{133}	—	April 19, 1998	Socorro	LINEAR	(5)	2.1 km	MPC · JPL
120833	1998 HF_{146}	—	April 21, 1998	Socorro	LINEAR	MRX	2.1 km	MPC · JPL
120834	1998 HG_{146}	—	April 21, 1998	Socorro	LINEAR	·	1.8 km	MPC · JPL
120835	1998 HM_{153}	—	April 24, 1998	Socorro	LINEAR	GEF	2.8 km	MPC · JPL
120836	1998 KL_{7}	—	May 23, 1998	Anderson Mesa	LONEOS	·	1.8 km	MPC · JPL
120837	1998 KE_{9}	—	May 27, 1998	Anderson Mesa	LONEOS	EUN	2.3 km	MPC · JPL
120838	1998 KN_{31}	—	May 22, 1998	Socorro	LINEAR	·	2.7 km	MPC · JPL
120839	1998 KX_{38}	—	May 22, 1998	Socorro	LINEAR	JUN	2.7 km	MPC · JPL
120840	1998 KH_{43}	—	May 28, 1998	Kitt Peak	Spacewatch	·	2.4 km	MPC · JPL
120841	1998 KC_{52}	—	May 23, 1998	Socorro	LINEAR	JUN	2.9 km	MPC · JPL
120842	1998 KD_{55}	—	May 23, 1998	Socorro	LINEAR	·	1.7 km	MPC · JPL
120843	1998 KM_{57}	—	May 22, 1998	Socorro	LINEAR	·	2.2 km	MPC · JPL
120844	1998 KL_{60}	—	May 23, 1998	Socorro	LINEAR	·	3.4 km	MPC · JPL
120845	1998 KU_{63}	—	May 22, 1998	Socorro	LINEAR	·	2.9 km	MPC · JPL
120846	1998 KM_{67}	—	May 23, 1998	Socorro	LINEAR	·	2.9 km	MPC · JPL
120847	1998 MG	—	June 17, 1998	Kitt Peak	Spacewatch	·	5.6 km	MPC · JPL
120848	1998 MM_{33}	—	June 24, 1998	Socorro	LINEAR	·	1.4 km	MPC · JPL
120849	1998 OJ_{3}	—	July 23, 1998	Caussols	ODAS	HOF	4.2 km	MPC · JPL
120850	1998 OO_{8}	—	July 26, 1998	La Silla	E. W. Elst	·	6.3 km	MPC · JPL
120851	1998 OF_{12}	—	July 29, 1998	Reedy Creek	J. Broughton	·	3.8 km	MPC · JPL
120852	1998 OO_{15}	—	July 20, 1998	Haleakala	NEAT	·	4.0 km	MPC · JPL
120853	1998 QK_{4}	—	August 17, 1998	Woomera	F. B. Zoltowski	·	1.2 km	MPC · JPL
120854	1998 QQ_{12}	—	August 17, 1998	Socorro	LINEAR	·	1.7 km	MPC · JPL
120855	1998 QO_{23}	—	August 17, 1998	Socorro	LINEAR	·	5.2 km	MPC · JPL
120856	1998 QP_{25}	—	August 17, 1998	Socorro	LINEAR	NAE	6.0 km	MPC · JPL
120857	1998 QX_{43}	—	August 17, 1998	Socorro	LINEAR	·	4.2 km	MPC · JPL
120858	1998 QT_{44}	—	August 17, 1998	Socorro	LINEAR	·	1.8 km	MPC · JPL
120859	1998 QT_{49}	—	August 17, 1998	Socorro	LINEAR	·	3.3 km	MPC · JPL
120860	1998 QW_{59}	—	August 26, 1998	Kitt Peak	Spacewatch	·	2.8 km	MPC · JPL
120861	1998 QA_{74}	—	August 24, 1998	Socorro	LINEAR	·	5.6 km	MPC · JPL
120862	1998 QL_{75}	—	August 24, 1998	Socorro	LINEAR	EOS	3.6 km	MPC · JPL
120863	1998 QF_{94}	—	August 17, 1998	Socorro	LINEAR	T_{j} (2.99) · EUP	9.0 km	MPC · JPL
120864	1998 QK_{99}	—	August 26, 1998	La Silla	E. W. Elst	·	2.1 km	MPC · JPL
120865	1998 QN_{106}	—	August 25, 1998	La Silla	E. W. Elst	·	1.8 km	MPC · JPL
120866	1998 RL_{2}	—	September 15, 1998	Caussols	ODAS	·	1.7 km	MPC · JPL
120867	1998 RM_{2}	—	September 15, 1998	Caussols	ODAS	·	3.1 km	MPC · JPL
120868	1998 RA_{13}	—	September 14, 1998	Kitt Peak	Spacewatch	·	990 m	MPC · JPL
120869	1998 RZ_{15}	—	September 14, 1998	Xinglong	SCAP	·	1.6 km	MPC · JPL
120870	1998 RM_{16}	—	September 11, 1998	Caussols	ODAS	·	1.2 km	MPC · JPL
120871	1998 RT_{19}	—	September 14, 1998	Socorro	LINEAR	·	1.5 km	MPC · JPL
120872	1998 RD_{23}	—	September 14, 1998	Socorro	LINEAR	·	1.2 km	MPC · JPL
120873	1998 RH_{26}	—	September 14, 1998	Socorro	LINEAR	·	1.4 km	MPC · JPL
120874	1998 RM_{27}	—	September 14, 1998	Socorro	LINEAR	EOS	3.7 km	MPC · JPL
120875	1998 RU_{30}	—	September 14, 1998	Socorro	LINEAR	·	1.3 km	MPC · JPL
120876	1998 RM_{31}	—	September 14, 1998	Socorro	LINEAR	·	8.1 km	MPC · JPL
120877	1998 RF_{37}	—	September 14, 1998	Socorro	LINEAR	·	1.4 km	MPC · JPL
120878	1998 RQ_{37}	—	September 14, 1998	Socorro	LINEAR	·	5.5 km	MPC · JPL
120879	1998 RP_{41}	—	September 14, 1998	Socorro	LINEAR	BRA	2.7 km	MPC · JPL
120880	1998 RW_{42}	—	September 14, 1998	Socorro	LINEAR	(1338) (FLO)	1.2 km	MPC · JPL
120881	1998 RG_{45}	—	September 14, 1998	Socorro	LINEAR	GEF	2.9 km	MPC · JPL
120882	1998 RM_{48}	—	September 14, 1998	Socorro	LINEAR	·	4.0 km	MPC · JPL
120883	1998 RH_{49}	—	September 14, 1998	Socorro	LINEAR	·	2.8 km	MPC · JPL
120884	1998 RY_{50}	—	September 14, 1998	Socorro	LINEAR	EOS	4.1 km	MPC · JPL
120885	1998 RY_{53}	—	September 14, 1998	Socorro	LINEAR	·	6.0 km	MPC · JPL
120886	1998 RV_{67}	—	September 14, 1998	Socorro	LINEAR	·	1.4 km	MPC · JPL
120887	1998 RF_{70}	—	September 14, 1998	Socorro	LINEAR	·	1.4 km	MPC · JPL
120888	1998 RM_{70}	—	September 14, 1998	Socorro	LINEAR	·	1.8 km	MPC · JPL
120889	1998 RT_{75}	—	September 14, 1998	Socorro	LINEAR	·	1.4 km	MPC · JPL
120890	1998 SU	—	September 16, 1998	Caussols	ODAS	KOR	2.8 km	MPC · JPL
120891	1998 SD_{1}	—	September 16, 1998	Caussols	ODAS	·	1.2 km	MPC · JPL
120892	1998 SO_{3}	—	September 17, 1998	Caussols	ODAS	HYG	4.8 km	MPC · JPL
120893	1998 SN_{8}	—	September 20, 1998	Kitt Peak	Spacewatch	·	1.2 km	MPC · JPL
120894	1998 SK_{13}	—	September 21, 1998	Caussols	ODAS	·	1.3 km	MPC · JPL
120895	1998 ST_{14}	—	September 18, 1998	Anderson Mesa	LONEOS	·	1.4 km	MPC · JPL
120896	1998 SX_{19}	—	September 20, 1998	Kitt Peak	Spacewatch	·	3.5 km	MPC · JPL
120897	1998 SD_{21}	—	September 21, 1998	Kitt Peak	Spacewatch	·	4.8 km	MPC · JPL
120898	1998 SL_{21}	—	September 21, 1998	Kitt Peak	Spacewatch	·	5.0 km	MPC · JPL
120899	1998 SN_{21}	—	September 21, 1998	Kitt Peak	Spacewatch	·	1.1 km	MPC · JPL
120900	1998 SP_{25}	—	September 22, 1998	Anderson Mesa	LONEOS	·	1.3 km	MPC · JPL

== 120901–121000 ==
back to top

Designation			Discovery			Properties		Ref
Permanent	Provisional	Named after	Date	Site	Discoverer(s)	Category	Diam.	Ref
120901	1998 SD_{26}	—	September 22, 1998	Anderson Mesa	LONEOS	·	1.5 km	MPC · JPL
120902	1998 SL_{28}	—	September 17, 1998	Kitt Peak	Spacewatch	·	1.8 km	MPC · JPL
120903	1998 SV_{31}	—	September 20, 1998	Kitt Peak	Spacewatch	·	4.1 km	MPC · JPL
120904	1998 SW_{31}	—	September 20, 1998	Kitt Peak	Spacewatch	·	3.3 km	MPC · JPL
120905	1998 SY_{32}	—	September 23, 1998	Kitt Peak	Spacewatch	·	3.0 km	MPC · JPL
120906	1998 SL_{39}	—	September 23, 1998	Kitt Peak	Spacewatch	·	3.6 km	MPC · JPL
120907	1998 SW_{40}	—	September 25, 1998	Kitt Peak	Spacewatch	(11097)	6.2 km	MPC · JPL
120908	1998 SO_{41}	—	September 25, 1998	Kitt Peak	Spacewatch	THM	3.8 km	MPC · JPL
120909	1998 SO_{58}	—	September 17, 1998	Anderson Mesa	LONEOS	·	3.8 km	MPC · JPL
120910	1998 SR_{59}	—	September 17, 1998	Anderson Mesa	LONEOS	·	1.5 km	MPC · JPL
120911	1998 SP_{65}	—	September 20, 1998	La Silla	E. W. Elst	·	1.5 km	MPC · JPL
120912	1998 SP_{75}	—	September 21, 1998	La Silla	E. W. Elst	·	5.0 km	MPC · JPL
120913	1998 SE_{78}	—	September 26, 1998	Socorro	LINEAR	·	1.3 km	MPC · JPL
120914	1998 SZ_{78}	—	September 26, 1998	Socorro	LINEAR	·	3.4 km	MPC · JPL
120915	1998 SX_{81}	—	September 26, 1998	Socorro	LINEAR	·	1.2 km	MPC · JPL
120916	1998 SB_{83}	—	September 26, 1998	Socorro	LINEAR	·	5.1 km	MPC · JPL
120917	1998 SV_{83}	—	September 26, 1998	Socorro	LINEAR	·	3.7 km	MPC · JPL
120918	1998 SA_{84}	—	September 26, 1998	Socorro	LINEAR	·	1.2 km	MPC · JPL
120919	1998 SU_{85}	—	September 26, 1998	Socorro	LINEAR	·	1.4 km	MPC · JPL
120920	1998 SY_{85}	—	September 26, 1998	Socorro	LINEAR	·	1.1 km	MPC · JPL
120921	1998 SW_{92}	—	September 26, 1998	Socorro	LINEAR	·	1.6 km	MPC · JPL
120922	1998 SO_{93}	—	September 26, 1998	Socorro	LINEAR	·	1.1 km	MPC · JPL
120923	1998 SM_{99}	—	September 26, 1998	Socorro	LINEAR	EOS	3.0 km	MPC · JPL
120924	1998 SS_{104}	—	September 26, 1998	Socorro	LINEAR	·	1.7 km	MPC · JPL
120925	1998 SC_{107}	—	September 26, 1998	Socorro	LINEAR	·	6.1 km	MPC · JPL
120926	1998 SH_{107}	—	September 26, 1998	Socorro	LINEAR	·	1.4 km	MPC · JPL
120927	1998 SJ_{108}	—	September 26, 1998	Socorro	LINEAR	·	6.2 km	MPC · JPL
120928	1998 SP_{109}	—	September 26, 1998	Socorro	LINEAR	·	1.8 km	MPC · JPL
120929	1998 SM_{114}	—	September 26, 1998	Socorro	LINEAR	·	1.3 km	MPC · JPL
120930	1998 SX_{121}	—	September 26, 1998	Socorro	LINEAR	·	1.5 km	MPC · JPL
120931	1998 SU_{123}	—	September 26, 1998	Socorro	LINEAR	·	1.3 km	MPC · JPL
120932	1998 SL_{131}	—	September 26, 1998	Socorro	LINEAR	·	1.4 km	MPC · JPL
120933	1998 SL_{147}	—	September 20, 1998	La Silla	E. W. Elst	·	3.0 km	MPC · JPL
120934	1998 SE_{149}	—	September 26, 1998	Socorro	LINEAR	·	3.9 km	MPC · JPL
120935	1998 SG_{150}	—	September 26, 1998	Socorro	LINEAR	·	5.1 km	MPC · JPL
120936	1998 SJ_{153}	—	September 26, 1998	Socorro	LINEAR	·	5.3 km	MPC · JPL
120937	1998 SD_{155}	—	September 26, 1998	Socorro	LINEAR	·	3.0 km	MPC · JPL
120938	1998 SB_{162}	—	September 26, 1998	Socorro	LINEAR	·	6.1 km	MPC · JPL
120939	1998 SV_{162}	—	September 26, 1998	Socorro	LINEAR	KOR	2.6 km	MPC · JPL
120940	1998 TN_{12}	—	October 13, 1998	Kitt Peak	Spacewatch	·	4.3 km	MPC · JPL
120941	1998 TB_{17}	—	October 14, 1998	Caussols	ODAS	·	1.1 km	MPC · JPL
120942 Rendafuzhong	1998 TB_{18}	Rendafuzhong	October 1, 1998	Xinglong	SCAP	·	1.4 km	MPC · JPL
120943	1998 TN_{22}	—	October 13, 1998	Kitt Peak	Spacewatch	·	5.3 km	MPC · JPL
120944	1998 TH_{23}	—	October 14, 1998	Kitt Peak	Spacewatch	·	6.0 km	MPC · JPL
120945	1998 TJ_{26}	—	October 14, 1998	Kitt Peak	Spacewatch	·	5.7 km	MPC · JPL
120946	1998 TZ_{28}	—	October 15, 1998	Kitt Peak	Spacewatch	·	1.1 km	MPC · JPL
120947	1998 TN_{29}	—	October 15, 1998	Kitt Peak	Spacewatch	·	2.6 km	MPC · JPL
120948	1998 TZ_{37}	—	October 14, 1998	Anderson Mesa	LONEOS	·	3.9 km	MPC · JPL
120949	1998 UU_{3}	—	October 20, 1998	Caussols	ODAS	NYS	1.8 km	MPC · JPL
120950	1998 UY_{6}	—	October 20, 1998	Farra d'Isonzo	Farra d'Isonzo	·	1.4 km	MPC · JPL
120951	1998 UA_{9}	—	October 17, 1998	Xinglong	SCAP	·	1.5 km	MPC · JPL
120952	1998 UV_{14}	—	October 23, 1998	Kitt Peak	Spacewatch	·	1.5 km	MPC · JPL
120953	1998 UQ_{22}	—	October 28, 1998	Socorro	LINEAR	·	5.4 km	MPC · JPL
120954	1998 UD_{25}	—	October 18, 1998	La Silla	E. W. Elst	(2076)	1.8 km	MPC · JPL
120955	1998 UO_{31}	—	October 22, 1998	Xinglong	SCAP	·	1.8 km	MPC · JPL
120956	1998 UX_{37}	—	October 28, 1998	Socorro	LINEAR	·	1.3 km	MPC · JPL
120957	1998 UW_{40}	—	October 28, 1998	Socorro	LINEAR	·	4.5 km	MPC · JPL
120958	1998 UA_{43}	—	October 28, 1998	Socorro	LINEAR	·	8.8 km	MPC · JPL
120959	1998 UP_{48}	—	October 17, 1998	Anderson Mesa	LONEOS	·	1.1 km	MPC · JPL
120960	1998 VC_{3}	—	November 10, 1998	Caussols	ODAS	MAS	1.3 km	MPC · JPL
120961	1998 VJ_{4}	—	November 11, 1998	Caussols	ODAS	EOS	3.8 km	MPC · JPL
120962	1998 VM_{11}	—	November 10, 1998	Socorro	LINEAR	3:2	9.5 km	MPC · JPL
120963	1998 VE_{12}	—	November 10, 1998	Socorro	LINEAR	·	3.3 km	MPC · JPL
120964	1998 VK_{22}	—	November 10, 1998	Socorro	LINEAR	·	1.3 km	MPC · JPL
120965	1998 VV_{27}	—	November 10, 1998	Socorro	LINEAR	·	1.5 km	MPC · JPL
120966	1998 VT_{29}	—	November 10, 1998	Socorro	LINEAR	·	1.7 km	MPC · JPL
120967	1998 VL_{30}	—	November 10, 1998	Socorro	LINEAR	·	1.2 km	MPC · JPL
120968	1998 VH_{32}	—	November 10, 1998	Reedy Creek	J. Broughton	·	2.0 km	MPC · JPL
120969	1998 VM_{38}	—	November 10, 1998	Socorro	LINEAR	·	1.7 km	MPC · JPL
120970	1998 VR_{43}	—	November 15, 1998	Kitt Peak	Spacewatch	NYS	1.7 km	MPC · JPL
120971	1998 VN_{49}	—	November 11, 1998	Socorro	LINEAR	EOS	5.0 km	MPC · JPL
120972	1998 WE_{4}	—	November 20, 1998	Gekko	T. Kagawa	·	1.5 km	MPC · JPL
120973	1998 WW_{4}	—	November 19, 1998	Catalina	CSS	PHO	2.3 km	MPC · JPL
120974	1998 WW_{8}	—	November 18, 1998	Chichibu	N. Satō	·	1.8 km	MPC · JPL
120975	1998 WE_{19}	—	November 21, 1998	Socorro	LINEAR	·	1.2 km	MPC · JPL
120976	1998 WL_{25}	—	November 16, 1998	Kitt Peak	Spacewatch	·	4.6 km	MPC · JPL
120977	1998 WN_{28}	—	November 19, 1998	Kitt Peak	Spacewatch	·	2.0 km	MPC · JPL
120978	1998 WU_{35}	—	November 19, 1998	Kitt Peak	Spacewatch	V	860 m	MPC · JPL
120979	1998 XU	—	December 7, 1998	Caussols	ODAS	·	1.4 km	MPC · JPL
120980	1998 XY_{5}	—	December 8, 1998	Kitt Peak	Spacewatch	·	1.3 km	MPC · JPL
120981	1998 XZ_{5}	—	December 8, 1998	Kitt Peak	Spacewatch	·	1.3 km	MPC · JPL
120982	1998 XE_{6}	—	December 8, 1998	Kitt Peak	Spacewatch	·	1.4 km	MPC · JPL
120983	1998 XG_{7}	—	December 8, 1998	Kitt Peak	Spacewatch	·	5.5 km	MPC · JPL
120984	1998 XN_{7}	—	December 8, 1998	Kitt Peak	Spacewatch	·	1.5 km	MPC · JPL
120985	1998 XT_{15}	—	December 15, 1998	Kleť	Kleť	·	1.7 km	MPC · JPL
120986	1998 XM_{17}	—	December 15, 1998	Socorro	LINEAR	PHO	2.0 km	MPC · JPL
120987	1998 XA_{18}	—	December 8, 1998	Kitt Peak	Spacewatch	·	7.1 km	MPC · JPL
120988	1998 XM_{18}	—	December 8, 1998	Kitt Peak	Spacewatch	THM	3.5 km	MPC · JPL
120989	1998 XG_{21}	—	December 10, 1998	Kitt Peak	Spacewatch	·	1.3 km	MPC · JPL
120990	1998 XP_{21}	—	December 10, 1998	Kitt Peak	Spacewatch	·	1.2 km	MPC · JPL
120991	1998 XQ_{21}	—	December 10, 1998	Kitt Peak	Spacewatch	·	2.0 km	MPC · JPL
120992	1998 XS_{23}	—	December 11, 1998	Kitt Peak	Spacewatch	·	5.0 km	MPC · JPL
120993	1998 XC_{25}	—	December 13, 1998	Kitt Peak	Spacewatch	·	1.3 km	MPC · JPL
120994	1998 XQ_{49}	—	December 14, 1998	Socorro	LINEAR	·	3.1 km	MPC · JPL
120995	1998 XQ_{62}	—	December 11, 1998	Socorro	LINEAR	PHO	2.2 km	MPC · JPL
120996	1998 XE_{79}	—	December 15, 1998	Socorro	LINEAR	·	1.6 km	MPC · JPL
120997	1998 XT_{96}	—	December 11, 1998	Mérida	Naranjo, O. A.	NYS	1.3 km	MPC · JPL
120998	1998 YB_{2}	—	December 16, 1998	Caussols	ODAS	(2076)	1.5 km	MPC · JPL
120999	1998 YC_{2}	—	December 17, 1998	Caussols	ODAS	PHO	2.1 km	MPC · JPL
121000	1998 YG_{2}	—	December 17, 1998	Caussols	ODAS	·	2.6 km	MPC · JPL

back to top

== See also ==
- Meanings of minor-planet names: 120001–121000
