= 120375 Kugel =

Main-belt asteroid

Discovery
- Discovered by: C. Rinner
- Discovery site: Ottmarsheim Obs.
- Discovery date: 10 August 2005

Designations
- Named after: François Kugel (French astronomer)
- Alternative designations: 2005 PB_{6} · 1998 SM_{108} 2001 KE_{74}
- Minor planet category: main-belt · (inner) background · near-Flora

Orbital characteristics
- Epoch 1 July 2021 (JD 2459396.5)
- Uncertainty parameter 0
- Observation arc: 22.53 yr (8,228 d)
- Aphelion: 2.8289 AU
- Perihelion: 1.8077 AU
- Semi-major axis: 2.3183 AU
- Eccentricity: 0.2202
- Orbital period (sidereal): 3.53 yr (1,289 d)
- Mean anomaly: 189.77°
- Mean motion: 0° 16^{m} 45.12^{s} / day
- Inclination: 2.7591°
- Longitude of ascending node: 229.91°
- Argument of perihelion: 97.616°

Physical characteristics
- Mean diameter: 1.05 km (calculated)
- Synodic rotation period: 6.923±0.0085 h
- Geometric albedo: 0.24 (assumed)
- Spectral type: S/Q (SDSS-MOC)
- Absolute magnitude (H): 16.619±0.003 (R); 16.7 · 17.07

120375 Kugel (provisional designation 2005 PB_{6}) is a background asteroid from the inner regions of the asteroid belt, approximately 1 kilometer (0.6 miles) in diameter. It was discovered on 10 August 2005, by French amateur astronomer Claudine Rinner at her Ottmarsheim Observatory (224) in France. The stony S/Q-type asteroid in the region of the Florian clan has a tentative rotation period of 6.9 hours. It was named after French astronomer François Kugel.

== Orbit and classification ==
Kugel is a non-family asteroid of the main belt's background population when applying the hierarchical clustering method to its proper orbital elements. Based on osculating Keplerian orbital elements, the asteroid has also been considered a member of the Flora family (402), a giant asteroid clan and the largest family of stony asteroids in the main belt.

It orbits the Sun in the inner asteroid belt at a distance of 1.8–2.8 AU once every 3 years and 6 months (1,289 days; semi-major axis of 2.32 AU). Its orbit has an eccentricity of 0.22 and an inclination of 3° with respect to the ecliptic. The body's observation arc begins with its first observation as 1998 SM_{108} at Lincoln Laboratory ETS in September 1998, nearly 7 years prior to its official discovery observation at Ottmarsheim.

== Naming ==
This minor planet was named after French amateur astronomer François Kugel (born 1959), an active observer of comets and a collaborator of the discoverer. He has founded the Chante-Perdrix Observatory (A77) in 2005. The official naming citation was published by the Minor Planet Center on 6 August 2009 (M.P.C. 66728).

== Physical characteristics ==
In the SDSS-based taxonomy, Kugel has an SQ-type that transitions between the common S-type and less common Q-type asteroids.

=== Rotation period ===
In August 2012, a rotational lightcurve of Kugel was obtained from photometric observations in the R-band by astronomers at the Palomar Transient Factory in California. Lightcurve analysis gave a tentative rotation period of 6.923±0.0085 hours with a weak brightness amplitude of 0.09 magnitude (U=1). As of 2021, no secure period has been obtained.

=== Diameter and albedo ===
Kugel has not been observed by any of the space-based surveys such as the NEOWISE mission of NASA's Wide-field Infrared Survey Explorer, the Akari satellite or IRAS. The Collaborative Asteroid Lightcurve Link assumes an albedo of 0.24 – derived from 8 Flora the parent body of the Flora family – and calculates a diameter of 1.05 kilometers based on an absolute magnitude of 17.07.
