= List of minor planets: 145001–146000 =

The following is a partial list of minor planets, running from minor-planet number 145001 through 146000, inclusive. The primary data for this and other partial lists is based on JPL's "Small-Body Orbital Elements" and data available from the Minor Planet Center. Critical list information is also provided by the MPC, unless otherwise specified from Lowell Observatory. A detailed description of the table's columns and additional sources are given on the main page including a complete list of every page in this series, and a statistical break-up on the dynamical classification of minor planets.

Also see the summary list of all named bodies in numerical and alphabetical order, and the corresponding naming citations for the number range of this particular list. New namings may only be added to this list after official publication, as the preannouncement of names is condemned by the Working Group for Small Bodies Nomenclature of the International Astronomical Union.

Near-Earth obj.	MBA (inner)	MBA (outer)	Centaur
Mars-crosser	MBA (middle)	Jupiter trojan	Trans-Neptunian obj.
Unclassified

== 145001–145100 ==
Designation			Discovery			Properties		Ref
Permanent	Provisional	Named after	Date	Site	Discoverer(s)	Category	Diam.	Ref
145001	2005 EW_{203}	—	March 11, 2005	Kitt Peak	Spacewatch	·	970 m	MPC · JPL
145002	2005 EY_{204}	—	March 11, 2005	Mount Lemmon	Mount Lemmon Survey	·	2.0 km	MPC · JPL
145003	2005 EZ_{205}	—	March 13, 2005	Catalina	CSS	V	1.2 km	MPC · JPL
145004	2005 ER_{206}	—	March 13, 2005	Catalina	CSS	·	1.1 km	MPC · JPL
145005	2005 ES_{212}	—	March 4, 2005	Catalina	CSS	·	2.3 km	MPC · JPL
145006	2005 EH_{214}	—	March 7, 2005	Siding Spring	SSS	·	1.6 km	MPC · JPL
145007	2005 ER_{219}	—	March 10, 2005	Anderson Mesa	LONEOS	·	2.3 km	MPC · JPL
145008	2005 EO_{221}	—	March 11, 2005	Catalina	CSS	PHO	1.9 km	MPC · JPL
145009	2005 EW_{221}	—	March 12, 2005	Kitt Peak	Spacewatch	·	2.0 km	MPC · JPL
145010	2005 EE_{222}	—	March 4, 2005	Mount Lemmon	Mount Lemmon Survey	·	1.6 km	MPC · JPL
145011	2005 ET_{236}	—	March 10, 2005	Anderson Mesa	LONEOS	·	2.5 km	MPC · JPL
145012	2005 EU_{236}	—	March 10, 2005	Anderson Mesa	LONEOS	·	3.8 km	MPC · JPL
145013	2005 EO_{237}	—	March 11, 2005	Kitt Peak	Spacewatch	·	1.1 km	MPC · JPL
145014	2005 EC_{240}	—	March 11, 2005	Kitt Peak	Spacewatch	·	1.7 km	MPC · JPL
145015	2005 ES_{240}	—	March 11, 2005	Mount Lemmon	Mount Lemmon Survey	·	1.9 km	MPC · JPL
145016	2005 EE_{242}	—	March 11, 2005	Catalina	CSS	·	4.0 km	MPC · JPL
145017	2005 ED_{246}	—	March 12, 2005	Kitt Peak	Spacewatch	·	1.4 km	MPC · JPL
145018	2005 EP_{247}	—	March 12, 2005	Kitt Peak	Spacewatch	MAS	1.0 km	MPC · JPL
145019	2005 EB_{250}	—	March 14, 2005	Mount Lemmon	Mount Lemmon Survey	·	3.3 km	MPC · JPL
145020	2005 EA_{253}	—	March 10, 2005	Anderson Mesa	LONEOS	·	2.5 km	MPC · JPL
145021	2005 EB_{257}	—	March 11, 2005	Anderson Mesa	LONEOS	PHO	1.7 km	MPC · JPL
145022	2005 EC_{259}	—	March 11, 2005	Mount Lemmon	Mount Lemmon Survey	·	1.8 km	MPC · JPL
145023	2005 EB_{260}	—	March 11, 2005	Kitt Peak	Spacewatch	·	1.4 km	MPC · JPL
145024	2005 EU_{260}	—	March 12, 2005	Kitt Peak	Spacewatch	·	860 m	MPC · JPL
145025	2005 EH_{264}	—	March 13, 2005	Kitt Peak	Spacewatch	NYS	1.5 km	MPC · JPL
145026	2005 EK_{266}	—	March 13, 2005	Kitt Peak	Spacewatch	·	1.8 km	MPC · JPL
145027	2005 ET_{266}	—	March 13, 2005	Kitt Peak	Spacewatch	·	1.4 km	MPC · JPL
145028	2005 EY_{267}	—	March 14, 2005	Mount Lemmon	Mount Lemmon Survey	NYS	1.4 km	MPC · JPL
145029	2005 ER_{269}	—	March 15, 2005	Mount Lemmon	Mount Lemmon Survey	V	990 m	MPC · JPL
145030	2005 ET_{269}	—	March 13, 2005	Anderson Mesa	LONEOS	·	3.5 km	MPC · JPL
145031	2005 EB_{272}	—	March 11, 2005	Kitt Peak	Spacewatch	·	3.4 km	MPC · JPL
145032	2005 EX_{272}	—	March 3, 2005	Kitt Peak	Spacewatch	·	2.0 km	MPC · JPL
145033	2005 ET_{275}	—	March 8, 2005	Kitt Peak	Spacewatch	PHO	1.3 km	MPC · JPL
145034	2005 EC_{278}	—	March 9, 2005	Anderson Mesa	LONEOS	V	1 km	MPC · JPL
145035	2005 EC_{282}	—	March 10, 2005	Anderson Mesa	LONEOS	·	1.3 km	MPC · JPL
145036	2005 EW_{282}	—	March 10, 2005	Kitt Peak	Spacewatch	·	3.2 km	MPC · JPL
145037	2005 EC_{291}	—	March 10, 2005	Catalina	CSS	V	1.2 km	MPC · JPL
145038	2005 EF_{295}	—	March 12, 2005	Socorro	LINEAR	·	2.9 km	MPC · JPL
145039	2005 EB_{312}	—	March 10, 2005	Mount Lemmon	Mount Lemmon Survey	·	930 m	MPC · JPL
145040	2005 FB_{2}	—	March 18, 2005	RAS	Lowe, A.	·	2.0 km	MPC · JPL
145041	2005 FJ_{6}	—	March 31, 2005	Junk Bond	Junk Bond	V	790 m	MPC · JPL
145042	2005 FO_{6}	—	March 30, 2005	Catalina	CSS	·	1.4 km	MPC · JPL
145043	2005 FE_{7}	—	March 31, 2005	Anderson Mesa	LONEOS	PHO	1.4 km	MPC · JPL
145044	2005 FH_{7}	—	March 31, 2005	Kitt Peak	Spacewatch	PHO	1.3 km	MPC · JPL
145045	2005 FP_{7}	—	March 30, 2005	Catalina	CSS	·	2.0 km	MPC · JPL
145046	2005 GD_{2}	—	April 1, 2005	Catalina	CSS	H	940 m	MPC · JPL
145047	2005 GW_{3}	—	April 1, 2005	Kitt Peak	Spacewatch	GEF ·	3.9 km	MPC · JPL
145048	2005 GR_{4}	—	April 1, 2005	Kitt Peak	Spacewatch	·	1.3 km	MPC · JPL
145049	2005 GR_{6}	—	April 1, 2005	Kitt Peak	Spacewatch	·	1.1 km	MPC · JPL
145050	2005 GN_{7}	—	April 1, 2005	Anderson Mesa	LONEOS	·	1.5 km	MPC · JPL
145051	2005 GT_{10}	—	April 1, 2005	Kitt Peak	Spacewatch	·	3.1 km	MPC · JPL
145052	2005 GY_{10}	—	April 1, 2005	Anderson Mesa	LONEOS	·	1.7 km	MPC · JPL
145053	2005 GX_{11}	—	April 1, 2005	Anderson Mesa	LONEOS	·	3.6 km	MPC · JPL
145054	2005 GD_{12}	—	April 1, 2005	Anderson Mesa	LONEOS	·	1.5 km	MPC · JPL
145055	2005 GQ_{12}	—	April 1, 2005	Anderson Mesa	LONEOS	·	1.8 km	MPC · JPL
145056	2005 GT_{12}	—	April 1, 2005	Anderson Mesa	LONEOS	·	940 m	MPC · JPL
145057	2005 GM_{13}	—	April 1, 2005	Anderson Mesa	LONEOS	·	2.2 km	MPC · JPL
145058	2005 GM_{19}	—	April 2, 2005	Mount Lemmon	Mount Lemmon Survey	·	4.6 km	MPC · JPL
145059	2005 GL_{20}	—	April 2, 2005	Mount Lemmon	Mount Lemmon Survey	·	2.7 km	MPC · JPL
145060	2005 GV_{20}	—	April 2, 2005	Mount Lemmon	Mount Lemmon Survey	NYS	1.7 km	MPC · JPL
145061	2005 GK_{21}	—	April 3, 2005	Palomar	NEAT	·	1.1 km	MPC · JPL
145062 Hashikami	2005 GS_{22}	Hashikami	April 4, 2005	Kitami	K. Endate	·	3.5 km	MPC · JPL
145063	2005 GZ_{22}	—	April 1, 2005	Anderson Mesa	LONEOS	·	5.5 km	MPC · JPL
145064	2005 GD_{23}	—	April 1, 2005	Anderson Mesa	LONEOS	·	5.3 km	MPC · JPL
145065	2005 GX_{23}	—	April 2, 2005	Mount Lemmon	Mount Lemmon Survey	·	1.1 km	MPC · JPL
145066	2005 GJ_{26}	—	April 2, 2005	Mount Lemmon	Mount Lemmon Survey	MIS	3.4 km	MPC · JPL
145067	2005 GO_{27}	—	April 3, 2005	Palomar	NEAT	·	1.3 km	MPC · JPL
145068	2005 GF_{30}	—	April 4, 2005	Catalina	CSS	·	2.4 km	MPC · JPL
145069	2005 GG_{31}	—	April 4, 2005	Catalina	CSS	·	1.7 km	MPC · JPL
145070	2005 GR_{32}	—	April 4, 2005	Socorro	LINEAR	·	1.8 km	MPC · JPL
145071	2005 GW_{32}	—	April 4, 2005	Socorro	LINEAR	·	2.3 km	MPC · JPL
145072	2005 GX_{32}	—	April 4, 2005	Socorro	LINEAR	·	1.4 km	MPC · JPL
145073	2005 GY_{32}	—	April 4, 2005	Mount Lemmon	Mount Lemmon Survey	·	1.3 km	MPC · JPL
145074	2005 GO_{33}	—	April 5, 2005	Anderson Mesa	LONEOS	·	1.9 km	MPC · JPL
145075 Zipernowsky	2005 GV_{33}	Zipernowsky	April 6, 2005	Piszkéstető	K. Sárneczky	·	2.0 km	MPC · JPL
145076	2005 GY_{36}	—	April 2, 2005	Anderson Mesa	LONEOS	MAS	1.2 km	MPC · JPL
145077	2005 GL_{38}	—	April 3, 2005	Siding Spring	SSS	·	1.2 km	MPC · JPL
145078 Katherinejohnson	2005 GO_{39}	Katherinejohnson	April 4, 2005	Catalina	CSS	·	2.0 km	MPC · JPL
145079	2005 GZ_{43}	—	April 5, 2005	Anderson Mesa	LONEOS	H	920 m	MPC · JPL
145080	2005 GG_{45}	—	April 5, 2005	Palomar	NEAT	·	1.4 km	MPC · JPL
145081	2005 GV_{49}	—	April 5, 2005	Mount Lemmon	Mount Lemmon Survey	NYS	1.7 km	MPC · JPL
145082	2005 GE_{50}	—	April 5, 2005	Mount Lemmon	Mount Lemmon Survey	·	1.8 km	MPC · JPL
145083	2005 GB_{53}	—	April 2, 2005	Mount Lemmon	Mount Lemmon Survey	·	2.8 km	MPC · JPL
145084	2005 GE_{53}	—	April 2, 2005	Mount Lemmon	Mount Lemmon Survey	·	1.8 km	MPC · JPL
145085	2005 GY_{53}	—	April 4, 2005	Socorro	LINEAR	RAF	1.5 km	MPC · JPL
145086	2005 GC_{54}	—	April 4, 2005	Mount Lemmon	Mount Lemmon Survey	·	3.5 km	MPC · JPL
145087	2005 GK_{54}	—	April 5, 2005	Mount Lemmon	Mount Lemmon Survey	·	1.3 km	MPC · JPL
145088	2005 GW_{54}	—	April 5, 2005	Mount Lemmon	Mount Lemmon Survey	NYS	1.7 km	MPC · JPL
145089	2005 GY_{59}	—	April 5, 2005	Catalina	CSS	H	850 m	MPC · JPL
145090	2005 GF_{60}	—	April 9, 2005	Siding Spring	SSS	H	970 m	MPC · JPL
145091	2005 GM_{64}	—	April 2, 2005	Catalina	CSS	PHO	1.5 km	MPC · JPL
145092	2005 GR_{66}	—	April 2, 2005	Mount Lemmon	Mount Lemmon Survey	V	1.2 km	MPC · JPL
145093	2005 GS_{73}	—	April 4, 2005	Catalina	CSS	·	2.2 km	MPC · JPL
145094	2005 GW_{73}	—	April 4, 2005	Catalina	CSS	·	3.0 km	MPC · JPL
145095	2005 GB_{74}	—	April 4, 2005	Catalina	CSS	·	4.7 km	MPC · JPL
145096	2005 GP_{74}	—	April 5, 2005	Anderson Mesa	LONEOS	·	1.1 km	MPC · JPL
145097	2005 GU_{74}	—	April 5, 2005	Socorro	LINEAR	fast	1.3 km	MPC · JPL
145098	2005 GJ_{86}	—	April 4, 2005	Catalina	CSS	DOR	4.1 km	MPC · JPL
145099	2005 GX_{87}	—	April 5, 2005	Anderson Mesa	LONEOS	·	2.0 km	MPC · JPL
145100	2005 GJ_{88}	—	April 5, 2005	Mount Lemmon	Mount Lemmon Survey	V	970 m	MPC · JPL

== 145101–145200 ==
back to top

Designation			Discovery			Properties		Ref
Permanent	Provisional	Named after	Date	Site	Discoverer(s)	Category	Diam.	Ref
145101	2005 GM_{88}	—	April 5, 2005	Mount Lemmon	Mount Lemmon Survey	·	3.0 km	MPC · JPL
145102	2005 GW_{90}	—	April 6, 2005	Kitt Peak	Spacewatch	ERI	2.3 km	MPC · JPL
145103	2005 GC_{96}	—	April 6, 2005	Kitt Peak	Spacewatch	·	1.3 km	MPC · JPL
145104	2005 GU_{101}	—	April 9, 2005	Kitt Peak	Spacewatch	·	1.8 km	MPC · JPL
145105	2005 GW_{101}	—	April 9, 2005	Socorro	LINEAR	SUL	3.4 km	MPC · JPL
145106	2005 GF_{105}	—	April 10, 2005	Kitt Peak	Spacewatch	·	3.1 km	MPC · JPL
145107	2005 GG_{105}	—	April 10, 2005	Kitt Peak	Spacewatch	·	1.1 km	MPC · JPL
145108	2005 GB_{113}	—	April 6, 2005	Catalina	CSS	·	1.8 km	MPC · JPL
145109	2005 GL_{113}	—	April 9, 2005	Mount Lemmon	Mount Lemmon Survey	NYS	1.5 km	MPC · JPL
145110	2005 GF_{117}	—	April 11, 2005	Kitt Peak	Spacewatch	V	1.2 km	MPC · JPL
145111	2005 GN_{119}	—	April 9, 2005	Siding Spring	SSS	EUN	2.0 km	MPC · JPL
145112	2005 GK_{121}	—	April 5, 2005	Catalina	CSS	·	1.3 km	MPC · JPL
145113	2005 GH_{123}	—	April 6, 2005	Kitt Peak	Spacewatch	·	1.6 km	MPC · JPL
145114	2005 GJ_{123}	—	April 6, 2005	Kitt Peak	Spacewatch	·	1.0 km	MPC · JPL
145115	2005 GP_{124}	—	April 9, 2005	Catalina	CSS	·	2.6 km	MPC · JPL
145116	2005 GT_{126}	—	April 11, 2005	Mount Lemmon	Mount Lemmon Survey	·	1.5 km	MPC · JPL
145117	2005 GV_{129}	—	April 7, 2005	Kitt Peak	Spacewatch	(5)	1.5 km	MPC · JPL
145118	2005 GJ_{130}	—	April 7, 2005	Kitt Peak	Spacewatch	MAS	1.2 km	MPC · JPL
145119	2005 GS_{132}	—	April 10, 2005	Kitt Peak	Spacewatch	·	1.3 km	MPC · JPL
145120	2005 GF_{135}	—	April 10, 2005	Mount Lemmon	Mount Lemmon Survey	·	1.8 km	MPC · JPL
145121	2005 GC_{136}	—	April 10, 2005	Kitt Peak	Spacewatch	·	2.0 km	MPC · JPL
145122	2005 GD_{136}	—	April 10, 2005	Kitt Peak	Spacewatch	·	1.3 km	MPC · JPL
145123	2005 GD_{139}	—	April 12, 2005	Socorro	LINEAR	·	1.9 km	MPC · JPL
145124	2005 GT_{139}	—	April 12, 2005	Mount Lemmon	Mount Lemmon Survey	·	2.6 km	MPC · JPL
145125	2005 GU_{141}	—	April 9, 2005	Socorro	LINEAR	·	2.2 km	MPC · JPL
145126	2005 GV_{144}	—	April 11, 2005	Mount Lemmon	Mount Lemmon Survey	·	1.3 km	MPC · JPL
145127	2005 GL_{147}	—	April 11, 2005	Kitt Peak	Spacewatch	·	1.2 km	MPC · JPL
145128	2005 GG_{149}	—	April 11, 2005	Kitt Peak	Spacewatch	HOF	4.8 km	MPC · JPL
145129	2005 GH_{150}	—	April 11, 2005	Kitt Peak	Spacewatch	·	2.0 km	MPC · JPL
145130	2005 GF_{153}	—	April 13, 2005	Anderson Mesa	LONEOS	·	1.4 km	MPC · JPL
145131	2005 GM_{153}	—	April 13, 2005	Catalina	CSS	·	3.3 km	MPC · JPL
145132	2005 GZ_{157}	—	April 12, 2005	Kitt Peak	Spacewatch	·	3.2 km	MPC · JPL
145133	2005 GO_{158}	—	April 12, 2005	Kitt Peak	Spacewatch	·	2.2 km	MPC · JPL
145134	2005 GU_{160}	—	April 12, 2005	Siding Spring	SSS	·	1.9 km	MPC · JPL
145135	2005 GU_{161}	—	April 13, 2005	Catalina	CSS	·	1.5 km	MPC · JPL
145136	2005 GY_{161}	—	April 14, 2005	Catalina	CSS	·	2.9 km	MPC · JPL
145137	2005 GW_{162}	—	April 13, 2005	Catalina	CSS	·	5.7 km	MPC · JPL
145138	2005 GB_{163}	—	April 4, 2005	Mount Lemmon	Mount Lemmon Survey	HNS	2.4 km	MPC · JPL
145139	2005 GV_{165}	—	April 11, 2005	Anderson Mesa	LONEOS	MAS	940 m	MPC · JPL
145140	2005 GV_{167}	—	April 11, 2005	Mount Lemmon	Mount Lemmon Survey	·	2.3 km	MPC · JPL
145141	2005 GF_{168}	—	April 11, 2005	Mount Lemmon	Mount Lemmon Survey	·	3.0 km	MPC · JPL
145142	2005 GX_{168}	—	April 12, 2005	Kitt Peak	Spacewatch	·	1.9 km	MPC · JPL
145143	2005 GL_{170}	—	April 12, 2005	Socorro	LINEAR	·	1.3 km	MPC · JPL
145144	2005 GU_{171}	—	April 12, 2005	Siding Spring	SSS	TIR	5.2 km	MPC · JPL
145145	2005 GV_{171}	—	April 13, 2005	Anderson Mesa	LONEOS	·	2.4 km	MPC · JPL
145146	2005 GC_{172}	—	April 14, 2005	Kitt Peak	Spacewatch	·	2.0 km	MPC · JPL
145147	2005 GD_{175}	—	April 14, 2005	Catalina	CSS	·	2.7 km	MPC · JPL
145148	2005 GR_{176}	—	April 14, 2005	Kitt Peak	Spacewatch	·	1.9 km	MPC · JPL
145149	2005 GX_{177}	—	April 15, 2005	Kitt Peak	Spacewatch	NYS	1.2 km	MPC · JPL
145150	2005 GX_{178}	—	April 15, 2005	Siding Spring	SSS	·	2.6 km	MPC · JPL
145151	2005 GH_{179}	—	April 13, 2005	Catalina	CSS	·	3.6 km	MPC · JPL
145152	2005 GS_{181}	—	April 12, 2005	Kitt Peak	Spacewatch	·	1.2 km	MPC · JPL
145153	2005 GJ_{182}	—	April 15, 2005	Anderson Mesa	LONEOS	·	2.2 km	MPC · JPL
145154	2005 GD_{201}	—	April 4, 2005	Mount Lemmon	Mount Lemmon Survey	·	1.8 km	MPC · JPL
145155	2005 HD	—	April 16, 2005	Cordell-Lorenz	Cordell-Lorenz	·	2.2 km	MPC · JPL
145156	2005 HO	—	April 16, 2005	Kitt Peak	Spacewatch	·	2.7 km	MPC · JPL
145157	2005 HY_{1}	—	April 16, 2005	Kitt Peak	Spacewatch	·	1.1 km	MPC · JPL
145158	2005 HU_{3}	—	April 28, 2005	RAS	Lowe, A.	·	2.2 km	MPC · JPL
145159	2005 HM_{4}	—	April 27, 2005	Campo Imperatore	CINEOS	·	1.4 km	MPC · JPL
145160	2005 HY_{4}	—	April 30, 2005	Kitt Peak	Spacewatch	·	5.2 km	MPC · JPL
145161	2005 HZ_{4}	—	April 30, 2005	Kitt Peak	Spacewatch	·	2.5 km	MPC · JPL
145162	2005 HG_{5}	—	April 30, 2005	Kitt Peak	Spacewatch	·	4.0 km	MPC · JPL
145163	2005 HT_{6}	—	April 28, 2005	Siding Spring	SSS	·	3.4 km	MPC · JPL
145164	2005 HA_{7}	—	April 30, 2005	Siding Spring	SSS	·	4.0 km	MPC · JPL
145165	2005 HS_{7}	—	April 30, 2005	Kitt Peak	Spacewatch	·	2.6 km	MPC · JPL
145166 Leojematt	2005 JL	Leojematt	May 3, 2005	Wrightwood	J. W. Young	·	1.2 km	MPC · JPL
145167	2005 JF_{1}	—	May 3, 2005	Socorro	LINEAR	V	990 m	MPC · JPL
145168	2005 JD_{3}	—	May 3, 2005	Catalina	CSS	·	2.5 km	MPC · JPL
145169	2005 JF_{3}	—	May 3, 2005	Catalina	CSS	·	1.1 km	MPC · JPL
145170	2005 JL_{3}	—	May 5, 2005	Palomar	NEAT	H	780 m	MPC · JPL
145171	2005 JV_{3}	—	May 2, 2005	Kitt Peak	Spacewatch	PHO	1.7 km	MPC · JPL
145172	2005 JX_{3}	—	May 2, 2005	Kitt Peak	Spacewatch	·	2.6 km	MPC · JPL
145173	2005 JX_{4}	—	May 4, 2005	Kitt Peak	Spacewatch	·	1.9 km	MPC · JPL
145174 Irenejoliotcurie	2005 JC_{5}	Irenejoliotcurie	May 4, 2005	Catalina	CSS	MAR	1.7 km	MPC · JPL
145175	2005 JF_{5}	—	May 4, 2005	Kitt Peak	Spacewatch	MAR	1.3 km	MPC · JPL
145176	2005 JJ_{5}	—	May 2, 2005	Kitt Peak	Spacewatch	EUN	2.3 km	MPC · JPL
145177	2005 JX_{13}	—	May 1, 2005	Palomar	NEAT	·	1.4 km	MPC · JPL
145178	2005 JN_{14}	—	May 1, 2005	Palomar	NEAT	·	1.1 km	MPC · JPL
145179	2005 JB_{16}	—	May 3, 2005	Socorro	LINEAR	·	1.3 km	MPC · JPL
145180	2005 JA_{20}	—	May 4, 2005	Catalina	CSS	·	3.7 km	MPC · JPL
145181	2005 JK_{20}	—	May 4, 2005	Catalina	CSS	TIR	5.0 km	MPC · JPL
145182	2005 JT_{20}	—	May 4, 2005	Catalina	CSS	·	3.6 km	MPC · JPL
145183	2005 JD_{21}	—	May 4, 2005	Catalina	CSS	·	2.2 km	MPC · JPL
145184	2005 JK_{21}	—	May 4, 2005	Siding Spring	SSS	MAS	1.2 km	MPC · JPL
145185	2005 JP_{21}	—	May 4, 2005	Siding Spring	SSS	·	1.1 km	MPC · JPL
145186	2005 JQ_{21}	—	May 4, 2005	Siding Spring	SSS	·	880 m	MPC · JPL
145187	2005 JW_{22}	—	May 1, 2005	Siding Spring	SSS	·	3.2 km	MPC · JPL
145188	2005 JJ_{24}	—	May 3, 2005	Kitt Peak	Spacewatch	·	2.3 km	MPC · JPL
145189	2005 JM_{24}	—	May 3, 2005	Kitt Peak	Spacewatch	NYS	1.4 km	MPC · JPL
145190	2005 JR_{26}	—	May 3, 2005	Kitt Peak	Spacewatch	V	830 m	MPC · JPL
145191	2005 JG_{27}	—	May 3, 2005	Socorro	LINEAR	·	3.0 km	MPC · JPL
145192	2005 JO_{27}	—	May 3, 2005	Socorro	LINEAR	·	2.3 km	MPC · JPL
145193	2005 JL_{29}	—	May 3, 2005	Catalina	CSS	·	2.1 km	MPC · JPL
145194	2005 JM_{29}	—	May 3, 2005	Catalina	CSS	EUN	2.8 km	MPC · JPL
145195	2005 JM_{30}	—	May 4, 2005	Kitt Peak	Spacewatch	·	3.0 km	MPC · JPL
145196	2005 JX_{31}	—	May 4, 2005	Anderson Mesa	LONEOS	·	2.5 km	MPC · JPL
145197	2005 JY_{31}	—	May 4, 2005	Mount Lemmon	Mount Lemmon Survey	·	3.3 km	MPC · JPL
145198	2005 JP_{32}	—	May 4, 2005	Socorro	LINEAR	·	2.0 km	MPC · JPL
145199	2005 JQ_{32}	—	May 4, 2005	Socorro	LINEAR	·	5.8 km	MPC · JPL
145200	2005 JR_{32}	—	May 4, 2005	Socorro	LINEAR	·	1.7 km	MPC · JPL

== 145201–145300 ==
back to top

Designation			Discovery			Properties		Ref
Permanent	Provisional	Named after	Date	Site	Discoverer(s)	Category	Diam.	Ref
145201	2005 JQ_{33}	—	May 4, 2005	Mount Lemmon	Mount Lemmon Survey	·	3.0 km	MPC · JPL
145202	2005 JS_{33}	—	May 4, 2005	Mount Lemmon	Mount Lemmon Survey	(32418)	4.2 km	MPC · JPL
145203	2005 JZ_{33}	—	May 4, 2005	Mount Lemmon	Mount Lemmon Survey	AST	2.5 km	MPC · JPL
145204	2005 JT_{34}	—	May 4, 2005	Kitt Peak	Spacewatch	·	1.4 km	MPC · JPL
145205	2005 JP_{36}	—	May 4, 2005	Palomar	NEAT	·	1.3 km	MPC · JPL
145206	2005 JQ_{36}	—	May 4, 2005	Palomar	NEAT	·	2.2 km	MPC · JPL
145207	2005 JS_{36}	—	May 4, 2005	Palomar	NEAT	NYS	2.0 km	MPC · JPL
145208	2005 JJ_{38}	—	May 6, 2005	Haleakala	NEAT	·	5.8 km	MPC · JPL
145209	2005 JY_{38}	—	May 7, 2005	Kitt Peak	Spacewatch	·	2.1 km	MPC · JPL
145210	2005 JZ_{38}	—	May 7, 2005	Kitt Peak	Spacewatch	·	3.6 km	MPC · JPL
145211	2005 JO_{39}	—	May 7, 2005	Mount Lemmon	Mount Lemmon Survey	·	1.6 km	MPC · JPL
145212	2005 JY_{43}	—	May 4, 2005	Socorro	LINEAR	ADE	2.1 km	MPC · JPL
145213	2005 JE_{44}	—	May 4, 2005	Socorro	LINEAR	V	1.2 km	MPC · JPL
145214	2005 JF_{44}	—	May 4, 2005	Palomar	NEAT	·	5.7 km	MPC · JPL
145215	2005 JM_{46}	—	May 3, 2005	Kitt Peak	Spacewatch	·	770 m	MPC · JPL
145216	2005 JO_{48}	—	May 3, 2005	Kitt Peak	Spacewatch	·	2.5 km	MPC · JPL
145217	2005 JZ_{48}	—	May 3, 2005	Socorro	LINEAR	·	3.3 km	MPC · JPL
145218	2005 JH_{49}	—	May 4, 2005	Kitt Peak	Spacewatch	·	3.5 km	MPC · JPL
145219	2005 JQ_{55}	—	May 4, 2005	Catalina	CSS	·	4.2 km	MPC · JPL
145220	2005 JC_{56}	—	May 6, 2005	Socorro	LINEAR	·	6.4 km	MPC · JPL
145221	2005 JT_{57}	—	May 7, 2005	Kitt Peak	Spacewatch	·	3.6 km	MPC · JPL
145222	2005 JY_{60}	—	May 8, 2005	Mount Lemmon	Mount Lemmon Survey	DOR	4.2 km	MPC · JPL
145223	2005 JS_{61}	—	May 8, 2005	Siding Spring	SSS	V	1.0 km	MPC · JPL
145224	2005 JR_{63}	—	May 10, 2005	Catalina	CSS	·	4.2 km	MPC · JPL
145225	2005 JO_{66}	—	May 4, 2005	Palomar	NEAT	·	2.1 km	MPC · JPL
145226	2005 JE_{67}	—	May 4, 2005	Catalina	CSS	EUN	2.1 km	MPC · JPL
145227	2005 JG_{67}	—	May 4, 2005	Catalina	CSS	·	2.5 km	MPC · JPL
145228	2005 JF_{68}	—	May 6, 2005	Socorro	LINEAR	·	3.6 km	MPC · JPL
145229	2005 JT_{70}	—	May 7, 2005	Catalina	CSS	·	1.9 km	MPC · JPL
145230	2005 JM_{75}	—	May 9, 2005	Catalina	CSS	PHO	1.6 km	MPC · JPL
145231	2005 JX_{77}	—	May 10, 2005	Anderson Mesa	LONEOS	LIX	6.0 km	MPC · JPL
145232	2005 JU_{79}	—	May 10, 2005	Mount Lemmon	Mount Lemmon Survey	·	1.3 km	MPC · JPL
145233	2005 JB_{80}	—	May 10, 2005	Mount Lemmon	Mount Lemmon Survey	·	3.1 km	MPC · JPL
145234	2005 JQ_{80}	—	May 10, 2005	Kitt Peak	Spacewatch	·	4.6 km	MPC · JPL
145235	2005 JB_{83}	—	May 8, 2005	Kitt Peak	Spacewatch	·	1.9 km	MPC · JPL
145236	2005 JY_{84}	—	May 8, 2005	Mount Lemmon	Mount Lemmon Survey	·	2.0 km	MPC · JPL
145237	2005 JE_{85}	—	May 8, 2005	Socorro	LINEAR	·	1.4 km	MPC · JPL
145238	2005 JO_{87}	—	May 9, 2005	Anderson Mesa	LONEOS	EOS	2.7 km	MPC · JPL
145239	2005 JW_{88}	—	May 11, 2005	Palomar	NEAT	·	3.2 km	MPC · JPL
145240	2005 JN_{91}	—	May 8, 2005	Siding Spring	SSS	·	3.0 km	MPC · JPL
145241	2005 JT_{91}	—	May 10, 2005	Mount Lemmon	Mount Lemmon Survey	·	1.8 km	MPC · JPL
145242	2005 JS_{92}	—	May 11, 2005	Palomar	NEAT	·	3.3 km	MPC · JPL
145243	2005 JX_{95}	—	May 8, 2005	Kitt Peak	Spacewatch	·	1.1 km	MPC · JPL
145244	2005 JO_{98}	—	May 8, 2005	Anderson Mesa	LONEOS	·	5.2 km	MPC · JPL
145245	2005 JX_{102}	—	May 9, 2005	Catalina	CSS	·	2.9 km	MPC · JPL
145246	2005 JN_{103}	—	May 10, 2005	Kitt Peak	Spacewatch	MAS	1.2 km	MPC · JPL
145247	2005 JK_{105}	—	May 11, 2005	Catalina	CSS	·	1.8 km	MPC · JPL
145248	2005 JB_{106}	—	May 11, 2005	Mount Lemmon	Mount Lemmon Survey	·	970 m	MPC · JPL
145249	2005 JJ_{109}	—	May 3, 2005	Reedy Creek	J. Broughton	NYS	1.8 km	MPC · JPL
145250	2005 JN_{112}	—	May 9, 2005	Catalina	CSS	DOR	3.4 km	MPC · JPL
145251	2005 JP_{112}	—	May 9, 2005	Socorro	LINEAR	·	2.3 km	MPC · JPL
145252	2005 JO_{117}	—	May 10, 2005	Kitt Peak	Spacewatch	V	1.1 km	MPC · JPL
145253	2005 JJ_{118}	—	May 10, 2005	Kitt Peak	Spacewatch	·	2.0 km	MPC · JPL
145254	2005 JP_{119}	—	May 10, 2005	Kitt Peak	Spacewatch	·	3.4 km	MPC · JPL
145255	2005 JB_{122}	—	May 10, 2005	Kitt Peak	Spacewatch	·	4.8 km	MPC · JPL
145256	2005 JL_{125}	—	May 11, 2005	Kitt Peak	Spacewatch	·	5.7 km	MPC · JPL
145257	2005 JQ_{127}	—	May 12, 2005	Socorro	LINEAR	EOS	3.0 km	MPC · JPL
145258	2005 JT_{127}	—	May 12, 2005	Socorro	LINEAR	·	3.3 km	MPC · JPL
145259	2005 JA_{128}	—	May 12, 2005	Kitt Peak	Spacewatch	·	6.1 km	MPC · JPL
145260	2005 JJ_{128}	—	May 12, 2005	Socorro	LINEAR	·	2.3 km	MPC · JPL
145261	2005 JM_{130}	—	May 13, 2005	Socorro	LINEAR	·	3.1 km	MPC · JPL
145262	2005 JL_{131}	—	May 13, 2005	Mount Lemmon	Mount Lemmon Survey	·	2.0 km	MPC · JPL
145263	2005 JB_{133}	—	May 14, 2005	Kitt Peak	Spacewatch	(5)	1.5 km	MPC · JPL
145264	2005 JF_{133}	—	May 14, 2005	Kitt Peak	Spacewatch	NEM	2.7 km	MPC · JPL
145265	2005 JZ_{133}	—	May 14, 2005	Kitt Peak	Spacewatch	·	3.0 km	MPC · JPL
145266	2005 JE_{134}	—	May 14, 2005	Socorro	LINEAR	EUN	2.4 km	MPC · JPL
145267	2005 JW_{134}	—	May 14, 2005	Mount Lemmon	Mount Lemmon Survey	·	3.0 km	MPC · JPL
145268	2005 JZ_{136}	—	May 12, 2005	Catalina	CSS	LIX	5.2 km	MPC · JPL
145269	2005 JC_{138}	—	May 13, 2005	Kitt Peak	Spacewatch	LIX	6.2 km	MPC · JPL
145270	2005 JE_{138}	—	May 13, 2005	Kitt Peak	Spacewatch	·	4.3 km	MPC · JPL
145271	2005 JP_{138}	—	May 13, 2005	Mount Lemmon	Mount Lemmon Survey	·	1.0 km	MPC · JPL
145272	2005 JE_{139}	—	May 13, 2005	Catalina	CSS	EUP	6.1 km	MPC · JPL
145273	2005 JH_{139}	—	May 13, 2005	Siding Spring	SSS	·	2.5 km	MPC · JPL
145274	2005 JD_{140}	—	May 14, 2005	Socorro	LINEAR	V	1.2 km	MPC · JPL
145275	2005 JN_{140}	—	May 14, 2005	Catalina	CSS	EUN	1.9 km	MPC · JPL
145276	2005 JA_{144}	—	May 15, 2005	Mount Lemmon	Mount Lemmon Survey	·	2.4 km	MPC · JPL
145277	2005 JQ_{146}	—	May 13, 2005	Catalina	CSS	ADE	5.6 km	MPC · JPL
145278	2005 JZ_{146}	—	May 14, 2005	Mount Lemmon	Mount Lemmon Survey	·	2.0 km	MPC · JPL
145279	2005 JG_{147}	—	May 15, 2005	Mount Lemmon	Mount Lemmon Survey	·	2.0 km	MPC · JPL
145280	2005 JS_{147}	—	May 13, 2005	Catalina	CSS	ADE	5.1 km	MPC · JPL
145281	2005 JH_{156}	—	May 4, 2005	Mount Lemmon	Mount Lemmon Survey	MAS	1.1 km	MPC · JPL
145282	2005 JM_{160}	—	May 7, 2005	Kitt Peak	Spacewatch	EOS	3.2 km	MPC · JPL
145283	2005 JF_{163}	—	May 8, 2005	Mount Lemmon	Mount Lemmon Survey	·	1.4 km	MPC · JPL
145284	2005 JY_{165}	—	May 11, 2005	Mount Lemmon	Mount Lemmon Survey	·	860 m	MPC · JPL
145285	2005 JN_{167}	—	May 12, 2005	Socorro	LINEAR	·	1.9 km	MPC · JPL
145286	2005 JP_{167}	—	May 12, 2005	Palomar	NEAT	·	2.7 km	MPC · JPL
145287	2005 JN_{175}	—	May 2, 2005	Catalina	CSS	H	940 m	MPC · JPL
145288	2005 JL_{177}	—	May 7, 2005	Mount Lemmon	Mount Lemmon Survey	·	1.3 km	MPC · JPL
145289	2005 JU_{177}	—	May 8, 2005	Mount Lemmon	Mount Lemmon Survey	·	1.8 km	MPC · JPL
145290	2005 JX_{177}	—	May 8, 2005	Mount Lemmon	Mount Lemmon Survey	·	2.0 km	MPC · JPL
145291	2005 JO_{178}	—	May 11, 2005	Mount Lemmon	Mount Lemmon Survey	·	860 m	MPC · JPL
145292	2005 JA_{179}	—	May 14, 2005	Palomar	NEAT	slow	1.9 km	MPC · JPL
145293	2005 KE	—	May 16, 2005	Reedy Creek	J. Broughton	·	5.5 km	MPC · JPL
145294	2005 KX_{2}	—	May 16, 2005	Palomar	NEAT	·	9.4 km	MPC · JPL
145295	2005 KK_{6}	—	May 18, 2005	Palomar	NEAT	·	1.7 km	MPC · JPL
145296	2005 KC_{7}	—	May 19, 2005	Siding Spring	SSS	·	2.3 km	MPC · JPL
145297	2005 KS_{7}	—	May 19, 2005	Mount Lemmon	Mount Lemmon Survey	EOS	2.9 km	MPC · JPL
145298	2005 KB_{8}	—	May 20, 2005	Mount Lemmon	Mount Lemmon Survey	·	2.3 km	MPC · JPL
145299	2005 KE_{8}	—	May 20, 2005	Mount Lemmon	Mount Lemmon Survey	·	2.3 km	MPC · JPL
145300	2005 KK_{8}	—	May 21, 2005	Mount Lemmon	Mount Lemmon Survey	V	1.1 km	MPC · JPL

== 145301–145400 ==
back to top

Designation			Discovery			Properties		Ref
Permanent	Provisional	Named after	Date	Site	Discoverer(s)	Category	Diam.	Ref
145301	2005 KY_{8}	—	May 20, 2005	Mount Lemmon	Mount Lemmon Survey	JUN	2.2 km	MPC · JPL
145302	2005 KD_{9}	—	May 16, 2005	Mount Lemmon	Mount Lemmon Survey	·	1.9 km	MPC · JPL
145303	2005 KH_{9}	—	May 28, 2005	Reedy Creek	J. Broughton	·	1.2 km	MPC · JPL
145304	2005 KZ_{9}	—	May 30, 2005	Reedy Creek	J. Broughton	PHO	2.0 km	MPC · JPL
145305	2005 KT_{10}	—	May 31, 2005	Anderson Mesa	LONEOS	·	2.7 km	MPC · JPL
145306	2005 KC_{11}	—	May 28, 2005	Campo Imperatore	CINEOS	·	2.0 km	MPC · JPL
145307	2005 KA_{12}	—	May 31, 2005	Anderson Mesa	LONEOS	·	2.0 km	MPC · JPL
145308	2005 LD_{1}	—	June 1, 2005	Reedy Creek	J. Broughton	NYS	1.8 km	MPC · JPL
145309	2005 LE_{1}	—	June 1, 2005	Reedy Creek	J. Broughton	NYS	1.8 km	MPC · JPL
145310	2005 LF_{1}	—	June 1, 2005	Reedy Creek	J. Broughton	V	920 m	MPC · JPL
145311	2005 LH_{1}	—	June 3, 2005	Reedy Creek	J. Broughton	EUN	2.6 km	MPC · JPL
145312	2005 LB_{3}	—	June 3, 2005	Siding Spring	SSS	·	5.1 km	MPC · JPL
145313	2005 LK_{3}	—	June 3, 2005	Catalina	CSS	·	3.0 km	MPC · JPL
145314	2005 LE_{5}	—	June 1, 2005	Kitt Peak	Spacewatch	NYS	1.7 km	MPC · JPL
145315	2005 LR_{5}	—	June 2, 2005	Siding Spring	SSS	·	1.3 km	MPC · JPL
145316	2005 LV_{5}	—	June 3, 2005	Catalina	CSS	NEM	3.6 km	MPC · JPL
145317	2005 LA_{6}	—	June 3, 2005	Siding Spring	SSS	·	2.5 km	MPC · JPL
145318	2005 LT_{13}	—	June 4, 2005	Kitt Peak	Spacewatch	·	2.6 km	MPC · JPL
145319	2005 LC_{14}	—	June 4, 2005	Kitt Peak	Spacewatch	·	2.2 km	MPC · JPL
145320	2005 LE_{16}	—	June 5, 2005	Kitt Peak	Spacewatch	AGN	1.6 km	MPC · JPL
145321	2005 LU_{18}	—	June 8, 2005	Kitt Peak	Spacewatch	·	2.8 km	MPC · JPL
145322	2005 LP_{22}	—	June 8, 2005	Kitt Peak	Spacewatch	·	3.8 km	MPC · JPL
145323	2005 LR_{22}	—	June 8, 2005	Kitt Peak	Spacewatch	·	7.2 km	MPC · JPL
145324	2005 LE_{25}	—	June 8, 2005	Kitt Peak	Spacewatch	·	1.7 km	MPC · JPL
145325	2005 LG_{28}	—	June 9, 2005	Kitt Peak	Spacewatch	·	4.1 km	MPC · JPL
145326	2005 LB_{33}	—	June 10, 2005	Kitt Peak	Spacewatch	·	3.2 km	MPC · JPL
145327	2005 LA_{36}	—	June 12, 2005	Mount Lemmon	Mount Lemmon Survey	·	1.6 km	MPC · JPL
145328	2005 LH_{36}	—	June 13, 2005	Mount Lemmon	Mount Lemmon Survey	MIS	3.7 km	MPC · JPL
145329	2005 LH_{38}	—	June 11, 2005	Kitt Peak	Spacewatch	·	4.0 km	MPC · JPL
145330	2005 LR_{38}	—	June 11, 2005	Kitt Peak	Spacewatch	·	2.0 km	MPC · JPL
145331	2005 LC_{39}	—	June 11, 2005	Kitt Peak	Spacewatch	·	2.3 km	MPC · JPL
145332	2005 LT_{45}	—	June 13, 2005	Kitt Peak	Spacewatch	EUN	2.2 km	MPC · JPL
145333	2005 LG_{49}	—	June 10, 2005	Kitt Peak	Spacewatch	·	2.8 km	MPC · JPL
145334	2005 LP_{49}	—	June 11, 2005	Kitt Peak	Spacewatch	(5)	2.3 km	MPC · JPL
145335	2005 LM_{50}	—	June 13, 2005	Kitt Peak	Spacewatch	·	2.6 km	MPC · JPL
145336	2005 LM_{52}	—	June 2, 2005	Catalina	CSS	(10369)	4.5 km	MPC · JPL
145337	2005 MG_{1}	—	June 17, 2005	Mount Lemmon	Mount Lemmon Survey	KOR	2.1 km	MPC · JPL
145338	2005 MR_{2}	—	June 17, 2005	Mount Lemmon	Mount Lemmon Survey	·	1.8 km	MPC · JPL
145339	2005 MD_{3}	—	June 21, 2005	Palomar	NEAT	·	6.6 km	MPC · JPL
145340	2005 MZ_{3}	—	June 16, 2005	Kitt Peak	Spacewatch	·	2.9 km	MPC · JPL
145341	2005 MT_{7}	—	June 27, 2005	Mount Lemmon	Mount Lemmon Survey	·	2.6 km	MPC · JPL
145342	2005 MS_{9}	—	June 28, 2005	Palomar	NEAT	V · slow	1.2 km	MPC · JPL
145343	2005 MY_{9}	—	June 23, 2005	Palomar	NEAT	·	5.0 km	MPC · JPL
145344	2005 MN_{11}	—	June 27, 2005	Kitt Peak	Spacewatch	·	3.3 km	MPC · JPL
145345	2005 MA_{12}	—	June 28, 2005	Palomar	NEAT	·	3.6 km	MPC · JPL
145346	2005 MU_{12}	—	June 29, 2005	Kitt Peak	Spacewatch	·	2.6 km	MPC · JPL
145347	2005 MB_{13}	—	June 29, 2005	Palomar	NEAT	·	2.7 km	MPC · JPL
145348	2005 MJ_{15}	—	June 29, 2005	Palomar	NEAT	CYB	5.3 km	MPC · JPL
145349	2005 MS_{15}	—	June 27, 2005	Junk Bond	D. Healy	·	2.5 km	MPC · JPL
145350	2005 MR_{18}	—	June 28, 2005	Palomar	NEAT	·	2.3 km	MPC · JPL
145351	2005 ML_{19}	—	June 29, 2005	Kitt Peak	Spacewatch	EUN	1.9 km	MPC · JPL
145352	2005 MF_{21}	—	June 30, 2005	Palomar	NEAT	·	5.5 km	MPC · JPL
145353	2005 MK_{21}	—	June 30, 2005	Kitt Peak	Spacewatch	·	2.7 km	MPC · JPL
145354	2005 MY_{21}	—	June 30, 2005	Kitt Peak	Spacewatch	THM	4.2 km	MPC · JPL
145355	2005 MM_{22}	—	June 30, 2005	Kitt Peak	Spacewatch	EOS	3.5 km	MPC · JPL
145356	2005 MV_{23}	—	June 26, 2005	Mount Lemmon	Mount Lemmon Survey	·	1.7 km	MPC · JPL
145357	2005 ME_{25}	—	June 27, 2005	Kitt Peak	Spacewatch	·	4.1 km	MPC · JPL
145358	2005 MX_{25}	—	June 27, 2005	Kitt Peak	Spacewatch	·	2.2 km	MPC · JPL
145359	2005 ME_{26}	—	June 28, 2005	Kitt Peak	Spacewatch	·	1.1 km	MPC · JPL
145360	2005 MC_{27}	—	June 29, 2005	Kitt Peak	Spacewatch	·	2.6 km	MPC · JPL
145361	2005 MF_{29}	—	June 29, 2005	Kitt Peak	Spacewatch	·	5.4 km	MPC · JPL
145362	2005 MV_{29}	—	June 29, 2005	Kitt Peak	Spacewatch	·	1.7 km	MPC · JPL
145363	2005 MH_{31}	—	June 30, 2005	Kitt Peak	Spacewatch	EOS	3.0 km	MPC · JPL
145364	2005 MB_{35}	—	June 30, 2005	Palomar	NEAT	·	5.3 km	MPC · JPL
145365	2005 MT_{35}	—	June 30, 2005	Kitt Peak	Spacewatch	·	3.8 km	MPC · JPL
145366	2005 MP_{39}	—	June 29, 2005	Palomar	NEAT	·	4.6 km	MPC · JPL
145367	2005 MS_{41}	—	June 30, 2005	Kitt Peak	Spacewatch	·	3.6 km	MPC · JPL
145368	2005 MB_{43}	—	June 30, 2005	Palomar	NEAT	3:2	7.3 km	MPC · JPL
145369	2005 MK_{43}	—	June 24, 2005	Palomar	NEAT	·	2.8 km	MPC · JPL
145370	2005 MZ_{43}	—	June 27, 2005	Palomar	NEAT	GEF	1.8 km	MPC · JPL
145371	2005 MT_{44}	—	June 27, 2005	Kitt Peak	Spacewatch	·	2.9 km	MPC · JPL
145372	2005 MZ_{44}	—	June 27, 2005	Palomar	NEAT	·	2.6 km	MPC · JPL
145373	2005 MV_{49}	—	June 30, 2005	Kitt Peak	Spacewatch	3:2 · SHU	7.0 km	MPC · JPL
145374	2005 MJ_{50}	—	June 30, 2005	Anderson Mesa	LONEOS	·	3.6 km	MPC · JPL
145375	2005 NK_{4}	—	July 2, 2005	Kitt Peak	Spacewatch	·	1.9 km	MPC · JPL
145376	2005 NA_{6}	—	July 4, 2005	Catalina	CSS	·	7.9 km	MPC · JPL
145377	2005 NJ_{6}	—	July 4, 2005	Mount Lemmon	Mount Lemmon Survey	·	3.0 km	MPC · JPL
145378	2005 NB_{8}	—	July 1, 2005	Kitt Peak	Spacewatch	·	1.8 km	MPC · JPL
145379	2005 NU_{8}	—	July 1, 2005	Kitt Peak	Spacewatch	·	940 m	MPC · JPL
145380	2005 NK_{11}	—	July 3, 2005	Mount Lemmon	Mount Lemmon Survey	·	2.2 km	MPC · JPL
145381	2005 NR_{12}	—	July 4, 2005	Mount Lemmon	Mount Lemmon Survey	·	3.2 km	MPC · JPL
145382	2005 NY_{12}	—	July 4, 2005	Palomar	NEAT	EOS	3.5 km	MPC · JPL
145383	2005 NE_{14}	—	July 5, 2005	Kitt Peak	Spacewatch	·	4.3 km	MPC · JPL
145384	2005 NA_{16}	—	July 2, 2005	Kitt Peak	Spacewatch	·	3.3 km	MPC · JPL
145385	2005 NF_{16}	—	July 2, 2005	Kitt Peak	Spacewatch	·	2.3 km	MPC · JPL
145386	2005 NY_{16}	—	July 2, 2005	Kitt Peak	Spacewatch	·	2.9 km	MPC · JPL
145387	2005 NV_{18}	—	July 4, 2005	Mount Lemmon	Mount Lemmon Survey	·	1.3 km	MPC · JPL
145388	2005 NP_{24}	—	July 4, 2005	Mount Lemmon	Mount Lemmon Survey	·	1.9 km	MPC · JPL
145389	2005 NH_{31}	—	July 4, 2005	Mount Lemmon	Mount Lemmon Survey	·	1.4 km	MPC · JPL
145390	2005 NW_{31}	—	July 5, 2005	Kitt Peak	Spacewatch	EOS	3.5 km	MPC · JPL
145391	2005 ND_{39}	—	July 2, 2005	Reedy Creek	J. Broughton	·	2.5 km	MPC · JPL
145392	2005 NS_{39}	—	July 7, 2005	Reedy Creek	J. Broughton	·	5.1 km	MPC · JPL
145393	2005 NB_{43}	—	July 5, 2005	Palomar	NEAT	·	3.8 km	MPC · JPL
145394	2005 NT_{43}	—	July 6, 2005	Kitt Peak	Spacewatch	NYS	1.5 km	MPC · JPL
145395	2005 ND_{51}	—	July 6, 2005	Kitt Peak	Spacewatch	EUN	1.9 km	MPC · JPL
145396	2005 NE_{53}	—	July 10, 2005	Kitt Peak	Spacewatch	3:2	8.1 km	MPC · JPL
145397	2005 NC_{54}	—	July 10, 2005	Kitt Peak	Spacewatch	3:2	7.1 km	MPC · JPL
145398	2005 NH_{54}	—	July 10, 2005	Kitt Peak	Spacewatch	·	2.8 km	MPC · JPL
145399	2005 NJ_{56}	—	July 5, 2005	Palomar	NEAT	·	1.7 km	MPC · JPL
145400	2005 NN_{65}	—	July 1, 2005	Kitt Peak	Spacewatch	·	2.7 km	MPC · JPL

== 145401–145500 ==
back to top

Designation			Discovery			Properties		Ref
Permanent	Provisional	Named after	Date	Site	Discoverer(s)	Category	Diam.	Ref
145401	2005 NL_{70}	—	July 4, 2005	Palomar	NEAT	HYG	5.6 km	MPC · JPL
145402	2005 NT_{72}	—	July 7, 2005	Kitt Peak	Spacewatch	·	3.6 km	MPC · JPL
145403	2005 NC_{73}	—	July 8, 2005	Kitt Peak	Spacewatch	·	2.3 km	MPC · JPL
145404	2005 NX_{79}	—	July 10, 2005	Reedy Creek	J. Broughton	·	5.1 km	MPC · JPL
145405	2005 NK_{80}	—	July 13, 2005	Reedy Creek	J. Broughton	·	1.7 km	MPC · JPL
145406	2005 NL_{83}	—	July 1, 2005	Kitt Peak	Spacewatch	·	4.8 km	MPC · JPL
145407	2005 NN_{83}	—	July 1, 2005	Kitt Peak	Spacewatch	·	4.9 km	MPC · JPL
145408	2005 NJ_{84}	—	July 2, 2005	Kitt Peak	Spacewatch	VER	4.1 km	MPC · JPL
145409	2005 NT_{86}	—	July 3, 2005	Palomar	NEAT	·	5.6 km	MPC · JPL
145410	2005 NN_{87}	—	July 4, 2005	Socorro	LINEAR	RAF	2.2 km	MPC · JPL
145411	2005 NL_{99}	—	July 10, 2005	Kitt Peak	Spacewatch	·	4.8 km	MPC · JPL
145412	2005 OO	—	July 16, 2005	Kitt Peak	Spacewatch	(43176)	4.9 km	MPC · JPL
145413	2005 OK_{8}	—	July 26, 2005	Palomar	NEAT	EOS	2.8 km	MPC · JPL
145414	2005 OM_{13}	—	July 29, 2005	Palomar	NEAT	PAD	2.6 km	MPC · JPL
145415	2005 OW_{14}	—	July 27, 2005	Reedy Creek	J. Broughton	·	5.7 km	MPC · JPL
145416	2005 OA_{24}	—	July 30, 2005	Palomar	NEAT	·	4.4 km	MPC · JPL
145417	2005 PC_{2}	—	August 2, 2005	Socorro	LINEAR	T_{j} (2.98) · HIL · 3:2	10 km	MPC · JPL
145418	2005 PO_{11}	—	August 4, 2005	Palomar	NEAT	KOR	2.3 km	MPC · JPL
145419	2005 PW_{15}	—	August 4, 2005	Palomar	NEAT	·	4.0 km	MPC · JPL
145420	2005 PP_{17}	—	August 6, 2005	Siding Spring	SSS	·	5.9 km	MPC · JPL
145421	2005 PD_{19}	—	August 2, 2005	Socorro	LINEAR	3:2 · SHU	7.8 km	MPC · JPL
145422	2005 PT_{20}	—	August 7, 2005	Haleakala	NEAT	T_{j} (2.98) · 3:2	9.0 km	MPC · JPL
145423	2005 QQ_{4}	—	August 24, 2005	Palomar	NEAT	THM	5.4 km	MPC · JPL
145424	2005 QC_{16}	—	August 25, 2005	Palomar	NEAT	·	3.6 km	MPC · JPL
145425	2005 QP_{39}	—	August 26, 2005	Palomar	NEAT	NAE · slow	5.0 km	MPC · JPL
145426	2005 QS_{48}	—	August 26, 2005	Palomar	NEAT	T_{j} (2.96) · 3:2	14 km	MPC · JPL
145427	2005 QE_{52}	—	August 27, 2005	Anderson Mesa	LONEOS	·	3.9 km	MPC · JPL
145428	2005 QP_{64}	—	August 26, 2005	Palomar	NEAT	CYB	5.1 km	MPC · JPL
145429	2005 QO_{65}	—	August 27, 2005	Anderson Mesa	LONEOS	·	6.1 km	MPC · JPL
145430	2005 QH_{72}	—	August 29, 2005	Anderson Mesa	LONEOS	NYS ·	2.5 km	MPC · JPL
145431	2005 QZ_{77}	—	August 25, 2005	Palomar	NEAT	(12739)	2.3 km	MPC · JPL
145432	2005 QJ_{78}	—	August 25, 2005	Palomar	NEAT	·	2.0 km	MPC · JPL
145433	2005 QU_{79}	—	August 27, 2005	Anderson Mesa	LONEOS	·	6.1 km	MPC · JPL
145434	2005 QV_{84}	—	August 30, 2005	Socorro	LINEAR	·	2.4 km	MPC · JPL
145435	2005 QU_{87}	—	August 27, 2005	Bergisch Gladbach	W. Bickel	EOS	3.6 km	MPC · JPL
145436	2005 QF_{90}	—	August 25, 2005	Palomar	NEAT	·	3.2 km	MPC · JPL
145437	2005 QC_{94}	—	August 26, 2005	Haleakala	NEAT	3:2	10 km	MPC · JPL
145438	2005 QM_{94}	—	August 27, 2005	Palomar	NEAT	THM	3.9 km	MPC · JPL
145439	2005 QQ_{101}	—	August 27, 2005	Palomar	NEAT	·	4.0 km	MPC · JPL
145440	2005 QU_{143}	—	August 26, 2005	Campo Imperatore	CINEOS	·	7.5 km	MPC · JPL
145441	2005 QY_{157}	—	August 26, 2005	Palomar	NEAT	EOS	3.0 km	MPC · JPL
145442	2005 QB_{160}	—	August 28, 2005	Anderson Mesa	LONEOS	EOS	3.6 km	MPC · JPL
145443	2005 QR_{165}	—	August 31, 2005	Palomar	NEAT	3:2	10 km	MPC · JPL
145444	2005 QD_{175}	—	August 31, 2005	Kitt Peak	Spacewatch	·	2.5 km	MPC · JPL
145445 Le Floch	2005 RS	Le Floch	September 2, 2005	Saint-Véran	St. Veran	KOR	2.2 km	MPC · JPL
145446	2005 RN_{10}	—	September 8, 2005	Socorro	LINEAR	·	5.9 km	MPC · JPL
145447	2005 RE_{12}	—	September 1, 2005	Kitt Peak	Spacewatch	·	1.5 km	MPC · JPL
145448	2005 RJ_{26}	—	September 6, 2005	Socorro	LINEAR	HYG	5.9 km	MPC · JPL
145449	2005 RN_{27}	—	September 10, 2005	Anderson Mesa	LONEOS	·	3.5 km	MPC · JPL
145450	2005 RM_{31}	—	September 13, 2005	Črni Vrh	Matičič, S.	LIX	7.9 km	MPC · JPL
145451 Rumina	2005 RM_{43}	Rumina	September 9, 2005	Apache Point	A. C. Becker, Puckett, A. W., Kubica, J.	SDO	524 km	MPC · JPL
145452 Ritona	2005 RN_{43}	Ritona	September 10, 2005	Apache Point	A. C. Becker, Puckett, A. W., Kubica, J.	cubewano (hot)	679 km	MPC · JPL
145453	2005 RR_{43}	—	September 9, 2005	Apache Point	A. C. Becker, Puckett, A. W., Kubica, J.	Haumea	300 km	MPC · JPL
145454	2005 SL_{3}	—	September 23, 2005	Kitt Peak	Spacewatch	·	2.4 km	MPC · JPL
145455	2005 SU_{3}	—	September 23, 2005	Kitt Peak	Spacewatch	·	3.7 km	MPC · JPL
145456 Sab	2005 SA_{5}	Sab	September 24, 2005	Vicques	M. Ory	·	8.5 km	MPC · JPL
145457	2005 SE_{5}	—	September 23, 2005	Anderson Mesa	LONEOS	·	3.7 km	MPC · JPL
145458	2005 SF_{22}	—	September 23, 2005	Kitt Peak	Spacewatch	LIX	9.2 km	MPC · JPL
145459	2005 SA_{25}	—	September 25, 2005	Catalina	CSS	·	3.3 km	MPC · JPL
145460	2005 SZ_{31}	—	September 23, 2005	Kitt Peak	Spacewatch	KOR	2.0 km	MPC · JPL
145461	2005 SD_{69}	—	September 27, 2005	Kitt Peak	Spacewatch	·	1.0 km	MPC · JPL
145462	2005 ST_{69}	—	September 27, 2005	Socorro	LINEAR	·	2.5 km	MPC · JPL
145463	2005 SU_{112}	—	September 26, 2005	Palomar	NEAT	·	4.8 km	MPC · JPL
145464	2005 SW_{133}	—	September 27, 2005	Socorro	LINEAR	HNS	2.5 km	MPC · JPL
145465	2005 SS_{134}	—	September 25, 2005	Kitt Peak	Spacewatch	·	4.6 km	MPC · JPL
145466	2005 SN_{165}	—	September 28, 2005	Palomar	NEAT	NYS	1.6 km	MPC · JPL
145467	2005 ST_{167}	—	September 28, 2005	Palomar	NEAT	·	1.9 km	MPC · JPL
145468	2005 SH_{173}	—	September 29, 2005	Kitt Peak	Spacewatch	·	4.3 km	MPC · JPL
145469	2005 SE_{222}	—	September 27, 2005	Palomar	NEAT	MAR	1.9 km	MPC · JPL
145470	2005 SJ_{222}	—	September 27, 2005	Palomar	NEAT	·	3.1 km	MPC · JPL
145471	2005 ST_{234}	—	September 29, 2005	Mount Lemmon	Mount Lemmon Survey	·	4.4 km	MPC · JPL
145472	2005 SD_{256}	—	September 22, 2005	Palomar	NEAT	·	5.7 km	MPC · JPL
145473	2005 SL_{262}	—	September 23, 2005	Palomar	NEAT	HIL · 3:2	7.3 km	MPC · JPL
145474	2005 SA_{278}	—	September 27, 2005	Apache Point	A. C. Becker, Puckett, A. W., Kubica, J.	SDO	208 km	MPC · JPL
145475 Rehoboth	2005 TP_{52}	Rehoboth	October 12, 2005	Calvin-Rehoboth	L. A. Molnar	·	3.0 km	MPC · JPL
145476	2005 TW_{65}	—	October 2, 2005	Palomar	NEAT	·	5.5 km	MPC · JPL
145477	2005 TM_{76}	—	October 5, 2005	Catalina	CSS	GEF	2.5 km	MPC · JPL
145478	2005 TC_{86}	—	October 3, 2005	Palomar	NEAT	T_{j} (2.99) · 3:2	10 km	MPC · JPL
145479	2005 TE_{124}	—	October 7, 2005	Kitt Peak	Spacewatch	KOR	2.1 km	MPC · JPL
145480	2005 TB_{190}	—	October 11, 2005	Apache Point	A. C. Becker, Puckett, A. W., Kubica, J.	SDO	464 km	MPC · JPL
145481	2005 UA_{72}	—	October 23, 2005	Catalina	CSS	EOS ·	6.4 km	MPC · JPL
145482	2005 UD_{130}	—	October 24, 2005	Palomar	NEAT	·	6.5 km	MPC · JPL
145483	2005 UM_{142}	—	October 25, 2005	Catalina	CSS	·	5.4 km	MPC · JPL
145484	2005 UV_{273}	—	October 23, 2005	Palomar	NEAT	·	4.0 km	MPC · JPL
145485	2005 UN_{398}	—	October 31, 2005	Anderson Mesa	LONEOS	T_{j} (2.71) · unusual	7.6 km	MPC · JPL
145486	2005 UJ_{438}	—	October 28, 2005	Kitt Peak	Spacewatch	centaur	21 km	MPC · JPL
145487	2005 UG_{455}	—	October 29, 2005	Catalina	CSS	URS	5.5 km	MPC · JPL
145488 Kaczendre	2005 VP_{3}	Kaczendre	November 4, 2005	Piszkéstető	K. Sárneczky	·	1.7 km	MPC · JPL
145489	2005 VG_{33}	—	November 4, 2005	Catalina	CSS	HNS	2.4 km	MPC · JPL
145490	2005 VB_{102}	—	November 1, 2005	Anderson Mesa	LONEOS	EOS	4.0 km	MPC · JPL
145491 Larakaufmann	2005 VX_{108}	Larakaufmann	November 6, 2005	Mount Lemmon	Mount Lemmon Survey	·	4.2 km	MPC · JPL
145492	2005 WD_{6}	—	November 21, 2005	Anderson Mesa	LONEOS	T_{j} (2.98) · 3:2	10 km	MPC · JPL
145493	2005 WA_{7}	—	November 21, 2005	Catalina	CSS	3:2	7.7 km	MPC · JPL
145494	2005 WO_{35}	—	November 22, 2005	Kitt Peak	Spacewatch	·	3.3 km	MPC · JPL
145495	2005 WK_{37}	—	November 22, 2005	Kitt Peak	Spacewatch	NYS	1.4 km	MPC · JPL
145496	2005 WQ_{113}	—	November 27, 2005	Socorro	LINEAR	CYB	9.8 km	MPC · JPL
145497	2005 XZ_{67}	—	December 5, 2005	Kitt Peak	Spacewatch	·	4.8 km	MPC · JPL
145498	2005 YQ_{190}	—	December 30, 2005	Kitt Peak	Spacewatch	THM	3.1 km	MPC · JPL
145499	2006 BV_{33}	—	January 21, 2006	Kitt Peak	Spacewatch	HYG	5.2 km	MPC · JPL
145500	2006 BL_{59}	—	January 24, 2006	Socorro	LINEAR	·	2.5 km	MPC · JPL

== 145501–145600 ==
back to top

Designation			Discovery			Properties		Ref
Permanent	Provisional	Named after	Date	Site	Discoverer(s)	Category	Diam.	Ref
145501	2006 BC_{101}	—	January 23, 2006	Catalina	CSS	·	4.1 km	MPC · JPL
145502	2006 BA_{191}	—	January 28, 2006	Kitt Peak	Spacewatch	·	3.7 km	MPC · JPL
145503	2006 BJ_{215}	—	January 24, 2006	Anderson Mesa	LONEOS	·	5.7 km	MPC · JPL
145504	2006 BC_{242}	—	January 31, 2006	Kitt Peak	Spacewatch	NYS	1.5 km	MPC · JPL
145505	2006 BN_{258}	—	January 31, 2006	Kitt Peak	Spacewatch	·	3.2 km	MPC · JPL
145506	2006 DH_{10}	—	February 21, 2006	Mount Lemmon	Mount Lemmon Survey	AEO	3.6 km	MPC · JPL
145507	2006 DW_{40}	—	February 22, 2006	Anderson Mesa	LONEOS	THM	5.9 km	MPC · JPL
145508	2006 DO_{50}	—	February 22, 2006	Catalina	CSS	slow	2.6 km	MPC · JPL
145509	2006 DX_{65}	—	February 21, 2006	Anderson Mesa	LONEOS	·	4.4 km	MPC · JPL
145510	2006 DZ_{82}	—	February 24, 2006	Kitt Peak	Spacewatch	·	5.1 km	MPC · JPL
145511	2006 DL_{93}	—	February 24, 2006	Kitt Peak	Spacewatch	·	3.9 km	MPC · JPL
145512	2006 DP_{93}	—	February 24, 2006	Kitt Peak	Spacewatch	·	3.9 km	MPC · JPL
145513	2006 DY_{96}	—	February 24, 2006	Mount Lemmon	Mount Lemmon Survey	·	3.3 km	MPC · JPL
145514	2006 DN_{119}	—	February 20, 2006	Socorro	LINEAR	·	5.5 km	MPC · JPL
145515	2006 DA_{122}	—	February 22, 2006	Catalina	CSS	·	3.9 km	MPC · JPL
145516	2006 DC_{148}	—	February 25, 2006	Kitt Peak	Spacewatch	KOR	2.5 km	MPC · JPL
145517	2006 DX_{152}	—	February 25, 2006	Kitt Peak	Spacewatch	NYS	1.4 km	MPC · JPL
145518	2006 DN_{199}	—	February 23, 2006	Anderson Mesa	LONEOS	·	2.7 km	MPC · JPL
145519	2006 DD_{208}	—	February 25, 2006	Kitt Peak	Spacewatch	·	3.8 km	MPC · JPL
145520	2006 EA_{16}	—	March 2, 2006	Kitt Peak	Spacewatch	·	1.3 km	MPC · JPL
145521	2006 EC_{30}	—	March 3, 2006	Socorro	LINEAR	·	6.9 km	MPC · JPL
145522	2006 EU_{38}	—	March 4, 2006	Catalina	CSS	EUP	6.0 km	MPC · JPL
145523 Lulin	2006 EM_{67}	Lulin	March 7, 2006	Lulin Observatory	Lin, H.-C., Q. Ye	·	3.9 km	MPC · JPL
145524	2006 FS	—	March 22, 2006	Catalina	CSS	·	2.1 km	MPC · JPL
145525	2006 FY_{2}	—	March 23, 2006	Kitt Peak	Spacewatch	NYS	1.2 km	MPC · JPL
145526	2006 FC_{11}	—	March 23, 2006	Kitt Peak	Spacewatch	·	1.8 km	MPC · JPL
145527	2006 FV_{19}	—	March 23, 2006	Mount Lemmon	Mount Lemmon Survey	ADE	3.5 km	MPC · JPL
145528	2006 FB_{29}	—	March 24, 2006	Catalina	CSS	CYB	6.7 km	MPC · JPL
145529	2006 FQ_{31}	—	March 25, 2006	Kitt Peak	Spacewatch	·	5.3 km	MPC · JPL
145530	2006 FW_{32}	—	March 25, 2006	Kitt Peak	Spacewatch	·	2.1 km	MPC · JPL
145531	2006 FF_{33}	—	March 25, 2006	Mount Lemmon	Mount Lemmon Survey	·	1.4 km	MPC · JPL
145532	2006 FD_{42}	—	March 26, 2006	Mount Lemmon	Mount Lemmon Survey	·	2.8 km	MPC · JPL
145533	2006 FE_{51}	—	March 24, 2006	Catalina	CSS	·	4.6 km	MPC · JPL
145534 Jhongda	2006 GJ	Jhongda	April 1, 2006	Lulin Observatory	Yang, T.-C., Q. Ye	MRX	2.1 km	MPC · JPL
145535	2006 GP_{3}	—	April 8, 2006	Great Shefford	Birtwhistle, P.	·	4.8 km	MPC · JPL
145536	2006 GP_{19}	—	April 2, 2006	Kitt Peak	Spacewatch	·	1.9 km	MPC · JPL
145537	2006 GB_{20}	—	April 2, 2006	Kitt Peak	Spacewatch	KOR	1.7 km	MPC · JPL
145538	2006 GP_{28}	—	April 2, 2006	Kitt Peak	Spacewatch	·	2.0 km	MPC · JPL
145539	2006 GU_{35}	—	April 7, 2006	Catalina	CSS	EUN	1.8 km	MPC · JPL
145540	2006 GR_{47}	—	April 9, 2006	Kitt Peak	Spacewatch	·	1.6 km	MPC · JPL
145541	2006 HN_{24}	—	April 20, 2006	Kitt Peak	Spacewatch	KOR	1.8 km	MPC · JPL
145542	2006 HA_{82}	—	April 26, 2006	Kitt Peak	Spacewatch	·	1.6 km	MPC · JPL
145543	2006 JF_{38}	—	May 6, 2006	Kitt Peak	Spacewatch	·	4.6 km	MPC · JPL
145544	2006 JP_{46}	—	May 7, 2006	Kitt Peak	Spacewatch	·	1.6 km	MPC · JPL
145545 Wensayling	2006 KA_{39}	Wensayling	May 22, 2006	Lulin Observatory	Q. Ye, Yang, T.-C.	CYB	5.8 km	MPC · JPL
145546 Suiqizhong	2006 KU_{67}	Suiqizhong	May 25, 2006	Lulin Observatory	Q. Ye, Lin, H.-C.	·	3.8 km	MPC · JPL
145547	2006 KC_{87}	—	May 27, 2006	Siding Spring	SSS	T_{j} (2.94)	2.7 km	MPC · JPL
145548	2006 KG_{99}	—	May 26, 2006	Mount Lemmon	Mount Lemmon Survey	·	1.8 km	MPC · JPL
145549	2006 KJ_{124}	—	May 23, 2006	Siding Spring	SSS	·	2.5 km	MPC · JPL
145550	2006 KA_{125}	—	May 29, 2006	Siding Spring	SSS	·	5.3 km	MPC · JPL
145551	2006 LX_{1}	—	June 10, 2006	Palomar	NEAT	GEF	2.4 km	MPC · JPL
145552	2006 LZ_{1}	—	June 11, 2006	Palomar	NEAT	·	2.2 km	MPC · JPL
145553	2006 LN_{5}	—	June 3, 2006	Catalina	CSS	slow	1.4 km	MPC · JPL
145554	2006 MJ_{9}	—	June 19, 2006	Mount Lemmon	Mount Lemmon Survey	·	1.5 km	MPC · JPL
145555	2006 MQ_{12}	—	June 19, 2006	Catalina	CSS	(69559)	6.4 km	MPC · JPL
145556	2006 MG_{14}	—	June 17, 2006	Siding Spring	SSS	MAR	2.0 km	MPC · JPL
145557	2006 ML_{14}	—	June 22, 2006	Anderson Mesa	LONEOS	·	1.4 km	MPC · JPL
145558 Raiatea	2006 OR	Raiatea	July 17, 2006	Hibiscus	S. F. Hönig	·	3.0 km	MPC · JPL
145559 Didiermüller	2006 OO_{1}	Didiermüller	July 18, 2006	Vicques	M. Ory	EOS	3.3 km	MPC · JPL
145560	2006 OG_{2}	—	July 18, 2006	Socorro	LINEAR	·	1.8 km	MPC · JPL
145561	2006 OV_{2}	—	July 18, 2006	Siding Spring	SSS	GEF	2.1 km	MPC · JPL
145562 Zurbriggen	2006 OY_{6}	Zurbriggen	July 24, 2006	Marly	P. Kocher	·	3.0 km	MPC · JPL
145563	2006 ON_{7}	—	July 18, 2006	Mount Lemmon	Mount Lemmon Survey	·	1.3 km	MPC · JPL
145564	2006 OF_{9}	—	July 20, 2006	Palomar	NEAT	·	1.9 km	MPC · JPL
145565	2006 OH_{10}	—	July 24, 2006	Vicques	M. Ory	·	5.2 km	MPC · JPL
145566 Andreasphilipp	2006 ON_{10}	Andreasphilipp	July 25, 2006	Ottmarsheim	C. Rinner	ADE	5.3 km	MPC · JPL
145567	2006 OZ_{10}	—	July 19, 2006	Palomar	NEAT	·	1.2 km	MPC · JPL
145568	2006 OJ_{11}	—	July 20, 2006	Palomar	NEAT	TIR	4.6 km	MPC · JPL
145569	2006 OL_{11}	—	July 20, 2006	Palomar	NEAT	·	1.0 km	MPC · JPL
145570	2006 OM_{11}	—	July 20, 2006	Palomar	NEAT	NYS	1.3 km	MPC · JPL
145571	2006 OY_{11}	—	July 21, 2006	Catalina	CSS	·	6.5 km	MPC · JPL
145572	2006 OJ_{12}	—	July 21, 2006	Palomar	NEAT	·	2.3 km	MPC · JPL
145573	2006 OA_{13}	—	July 20, 2006	Siding Spring	SSS	·	1.2 km	MPC · JPL
145574	2006 OD_{13}	—	July 21, 2006	Socorro	LINEAR	·	4.2 km	MPC · JPL
145575	2006 OV_{15}	—	July 20, 2006	Palomar	NEAT	EUN ·	3.9 km	MPC · JPL
145576	2006 PE	—	August 3, 2006	Cordell-Lorenz	Cordell-Lorenz	·	6.3 km	MPC · JPL
145577	2006 PK_{1}	—	August 8, 2006	Siding Spring	SSS	NYS	1.4 km	MPC · JPL
145578	2006 PA_{4}	—	August 15, 2006	Reedy Creek	J. Broughton	EUN	2.1 km	MPC · JPL
145579	2006 PQ_{6}	—	August 12, 2006	Palomar	NEAT	DOR	4.0 km	MPC · JPL
145580	2006 PM_{10}	—	August 13, 2006	Palomar	NEAT	·	7.0 km	MPC · JPL
145581	2006 PJ_{11}	—	August 13, 2006	Palomar	NEAT	AST	2.5 km	MPC · JPL
145582	2006 PP_{11}	—	August 13, 2006	Palomar	NEAT	·	2.9 km	MPC · JPL
145583	2006 PB_{14}	—	August 14, 2006	Siding Spring	SSS	·	2.4 km	MPC · JPL
145584	2006 PT_{14}	—	August 15, 2006	Palomar	NEAT	NYS	1.5 km	MPC · JPL
145585	2006 PU_{15}	—	August 15, 2006	Palomar	NEAT	NYS	1.8 km	MPC · JPL
145586	2006 PD_{16}	—	August 15, 2006	Palomar	NEAT	NYS	1.7 km	MPC · JPL
145587	2006 PT_{16}	—	August 15, 2006	Palomar	NEAT	·	1.1 km	MPC · JPL
145588 Sudongpo	2006 PQ_{17}	Sudongpo	August 15, 2006	Lulin Observatory	Q. Ye	V	860 m	MPC · JPL
145589	2006 PC_{18}	—	August 15, 2006	Palomar	NEAT	·	1.6 km	MPC · JPL
145590	2006 PF_{25}	—	August 13, 2006	Palomar	NEAT	KOR	2.2 km	MPC · JPL
145591	2006 PE_{31}	—	August 13, 2006	Palomar	NEAT	·	5.0 km	MPC · JPL
145592	2006 PL_{33}	—	August 13, 2006	Palomar	NEAT	·	5.3 km	MPC · JPL
145593 Xántus	2006 QE_{1}	Xántus	August 18, 2006	Piszkéstető	K. Sárneczky	·	2.8 km	MPC · JPL
145594	2006 QH_{2}	—	August 17, 2006	Palomar	NEAT	NYS	2.0 km	MPC · JPL
145595	2006 QE_{3}	—	August 17, 2006	Palomar	NEAT	·	1.8 km	MPC · JPL
145596	2006 QS_{3}	—	August 18, 2006	Socorro	LINEAR	·	3.4 km	MPC · JPL
145597	2006 QP_{6}	—	August 17, 2006	Palomar	NEAT	·	2.2 km	MPC · JPL
145598	2006 QZ_{6}	—	August 17, 2006	Palomar	NEAT	(2076)	1.0 km	MPC · JPL
145599	2006 QV_{8}	—	August 19, 2006	Kitt Peak	Spacewatch	MAS	1.1 km	MPC · JPL
145600	2006 QS_{11}	—	August 16, 2006	Siding Spring	SSS	·	7.5 km	MPC · JPL

== 145601–145700 ==
back to top

Designation			Discovery			Properties		Ref
Permanent	Provisional	Named after	Date	Site	Discoverer(s)	Category	Diam.	Ref
145601	2006 QV_{19}	—	August 18, 2006	Socorro	LINEAR	·	2.4 km	MPC · JPL
145602	2006 QG_{20}	—	August 18, 2006	Anderson Mesa	LONEOS	·	960 m	MPC · JPL
145603	2006 QP_{24}	—	August 17, 2006	Palomar	NEAT	·	1.0 km	MPC · JPL
145604	2006 QD_{25}	—	August 18, 2006	Socorro	LINEAR	·	1.7 km	MPC · JPL
145605	2006 QE_{27}	—	August 19, 2006	Kitt Peak	Spacewatch	NYS	1.7 km	MPC · JPL
145606	2006 QH_{29}	—	August 22, 2006	Siding Spring	SSS	·	3.7 km	MPC · JPL
145607	2006 QK_{30}	—	August 20, 2006	Palomar	NEAT	·	1.3 km	MPC · JPL
145608	2006 QL_{35}	—	August 17, 2006	Palomar	NEAT	EOS	3.0 km	MPC · JPL
145609	2006 QU_{35}	—	August 17, 2006	Palomar	NEAT	·	2.1 km	MPC · JPL
145610	2006 QG_{37}	—	August 16, 2006	Siding Spring	SSS	·	2.4 km	MPC · JPL
145611	2006 QP_{42}	—	August 17, 2006	Palomar	NEAT	AGN	1.7 km	MPC · JPL
145612	2006 QQ_{45}	—	August 19, 2006	Palomar	NEAT	V	890 m	MPC · JPL
145613	2006 QT_{47}	—	August 20, 2006	Kitt Peak	Spacewatch	·	1.8 km	MPC · JPL
145614	2006 QF_{48}	—	August 21, 2006	Kitt Peak	Spacewatch	·	1.7 km	MPC · JPL
145615	2006 QL_{54}	—	August 17, 2006	Palomar	NEAT	·	3.0 km	MPC · JPL
145616	2006 QV_{54}	—	August 18, 2006	Anderson Mesa	LONEOS	·	9.5 km	MPC · JPL
145617	2006 QS_{60}	—	August 20, 2006	Palomar	NEAT	·	2.5 km	MPC · JPL
145618	2006 QX_{78}	—	August 23, 2006	Socorro	LINEAR	GEF	2.2 km	MPC · JPL
145619	2006 QT_{80}	—	August 24, 2006	Socorro	LINEAR	·	3.8 km	MPC · JPL
145620	2006 QE_{94}	—	August 16, 2006	Palomar	NEAT	·	2.9 km	MPC · JPL
145621	2006 QG_{95}	—	August 16, 2006	Palomar	NEAT	·	4.8 km	MPC · JPL
145622	2006 QM_{95}	—	August 16, 2006	Palomar	NEAT	·	3.4 km	MPC · JPL
145623	2006 QL_{100}	—	August 24, 2006	Palomar	NEAT	·	1.2 km	MPC · JPL
145624	2006 QB_{102}	—	August 27, 2006	Kitt Peak	Spacewatch	·	2.6 km	MPC · JPL
145625	2006 QR_{107}	—	August 28, 2006	Socorro	LINEAR	·	1.3 km	MPC · JPL
145626	2006 QT_{119}	—	August 28, 2006	Anderson Mesa	LONEOS	·	1.5 km	MPC · JPL
145627	2006 RY_{102}	—	September 14, 2006	Palomar	NEAT	T_{j} (2.82) · unusual	37 km	MPC · JPL
145628	2135 P-L	—	September 24, 1960	Palomar	C. J. van Houten, I. van Houten-Groeneveld, T. Gehrels	·	1.3 km	MPC · JPL
145629	2188 P-L	—	September 24, 1960	Palomar	C. J. van Houten, I. van Houten-Groeneveld, T. Gehrels	NYS	1.5 km	MPC · JPL
145630	2214 P-L	—	September 24, 1960	Palomar	C. J. van Houten, I. van Houten-Groeneveld, T. Gehrels	·	2.2 km	MPC · JPL
145631	2215 P-L	—	September 24, 1960	Palomar	C. J. van Houten, I. van Houten-Groeneveld, T. Gehrels	·	4.7 km	MPC · JPL
145632	2216 P-L	—	September 24, 1960	Palomar	C. J. van Houten, I. van Houten-Groeneveld, T. Gehrels	·	2.1 km	MPC · JPL
145633	2227 P-L	—	September 24, 1960	Palomar	C. J. van Houten, I. van Houten-Groeneveld, T. Gehrels	·	1.5 km	MPC · JPL
145634	2516 P-L	—	September 24, 1960	Palomar	C. J. van Houten, I. van Houten-Groeneveld, T. Gehrels	GEF	2.4 km	MPC · JPL
145635	2585 P-L	—	September 24, 1960	Palomar	C. J. van Houten, I. van Houten-Groeneveld, T. Gehrels	·	4.1 km	MPC · JPL
145636	2597 P-L	—	September 24, 1960	Palomar	C. J. van Houten, I. van Houten-Groeneveld, T. Gehrels	·	1.4 km	MPC · JPL
145637	2671 P-L	—	September 24, 1960	Palomar	C. J. van Houten, I. van Houten-Groeneveld, T. Gehrels	·	3.6 km	MPC · JPL
145638	2715 P-L	—	September 24, 1960	Palomar	C. J. van Houten, I. van Houten-Groeneveld, T. Gehrels	·	2.0 km	MPC · JPL
145639	2847 P-L	—	September 24, 1960	Palomar	C. J. van Houten, I. van Houten-Groeneveld, T. Gehrels	·	2.3 km	MPC · JPL
145640	3008 P-L	—	September 24, 1960	Palomar	C. J. van Houten, I. van Houten-Groeneveld, T. Gehrels	·	2.1 km	MPC · JPL
145641	3562 P-L	—	October 17, 1960	Palomar	C. J. van Houten, I. van Houten-Groeneveld, T. Gehrels	·	2.5 km	MPC · JPL
145642	4058 P-L	—	September 24, 1960	Palomar	C. J. van Houten, I. van Houten-Groeneveld, T. Gehrels	·	4.8 km	MPC · JPL
145643	4064 P-L	—	September 24, 1960	Palomar	C. J. van Houten, I. van Houten-Groeneveld, T. Gehrels	·	4.4 km	MPC · JPL
145644	4107 P-L	—	September 24, 1960	Palomar	C. J. van Houten, I. van Houten-Groeneveld, T. Gehrels	HYG	7.0 km	MPC · JPL
145645	4125 P-L	—	September 24, 1960	Palomar	C. J. van Houten, I. van Houten-Groeneveld, T. Gehrels	·	6.6 km	MPC · JPL
145646	4170 P-L	—	September 24, 1960	Palomar	C. J. van Houten, I. van Houten-Groeneveld, T. Gehrels	·	2.2 km	MPC · JPL
145647	4193 P-L	—	September 24, 1960	Palomar	C. J. van Houten, I. van Houten-Groeneveld, T. Gehrels	·	2.0 km	MPC · JPL
145648	4223 P-L	—	September 24, 1960	Palomar	C. J. van Houten, I. van Houten-Groeneveld, T. Gehrels	·	2.0 km	MPC · JPL
145649	4233 P-L	—	September 24, 1960	Palomar	C. J. van Houten, I. van Houten-Groeneveld, T. Gehrels	·	2.9 km	MPC · JPL
145650	4242 P-L	—	September 24, 1960	Palomar	C. J. van Houten, I. van Houten-Groeneveld, T. Gehrels	·	1.4 km	MPC · JPL
145651	4264 P-L	—	September 24, 1960	Palomar	C. J. van Houten, I. van Houten-Groeneveld, T. Gehrels	MAS	880 m	MPC · JPL
145652	4278 P-L	—	September 24, 1960	Palomar	C. J. van Houten, I. van Houten-Groeneveld, T. Gehrels	HYG	6.0 km	MPC · JPL
145653	4333 P-L	—	September 24, 1960	Palomar	C. J. van Houten, I. van Houten-Groeneveld, T. Gehrels	EUN	1.7 km	MPC · JPL
145654	4728 P-L	—	September 24, 1960	Palomar	C. J. van Houten, I. van Houten-Groeneveld, T. Gehrels	·	4.2 km	MPC · JPL
145655	4740 P-L	—	September 24, 1960	Palomar	C. J. van Houten, I. van Houten-Groeneveld, T. Gehrels	·	5.0 km	MPC · JPL
145656	4788 P-L	—	September 24, 1960	Palomar	C. J. van Houten, I. van Houten-Groeneveld, T. Gehrels	AMO +1km	1.8 km	MPC · JPL
145657	6218 P-L	—	September 24, 1960	Palomar	C. J. van Houten, I. van Houten-Groeneveld, T. Gehrels	·	6.6 km	MPC · JPL
145658	6596 P-L	—	September 24, 1960	Palomar	C. J. van Houten, I. van Houten-Groeneveld, T. Gehrels	(5)	2.9 km	MPC · JPL
145659	6697 P-L	—	September 24, 1960	Palomar	C. J. van Houten, I. van Houten-Groeneveld, T. Gehrels	·	4.0 km	MPC · JPL
145660	6701 P-L	—	September 24, 1960	Palomar	C. J. van Houten, I. van Houten-Groeneveld, T. Gehrels	·	2.9 km	MPC · JPL
145661	6714 P-L	—	September 24, 1960	Palomar	C. J. van Houten, I. van Houten-Groeneveld, T. Gehrels	·	7.4 km	MPC · JPL
145662	6737 P-L	—	September 24, 1960	Palomar	C. J. van Houten, I. van Houten-Groeneveld, T. Gehrels	·	2.4 km	MPC · JPL
145663	6805 P-L	—	September 24, 1960	Palomar	C. J. van Houten, I. van Houten-Groeneveld, T. Gehrels	·	1.4 km	MPC · JPL
145664	6848 P-L	—	September 24, 1960	Palomar	C. J. van Houten, I. van Houten-Groeneveld, T. Gehrels	·	830 m	MPC · JPL
145665	6859 P-L	—	September 24, 1960	Palomar	C. J. van Houten, I. van Houten-Groeneveld, T. Gehrels	·	3.2 km	MPC · JPL
145666	6882 P-L	—	September 24, 1960	Palomar	C. J. van Houten, I. van Houten-Groeneveld, T. Gehrels	·	1.4 km	MPC · JPL
145667	9537 P-L	—	October 17, 1960	Palomar	C. J. van Houten, I. van Houten-Groeneveld, T. Gehrels	·	2.7 km	MPC · JPL
145668	1071 T-1	—	March 25, 1971	Palomar	C. J. van Houten, I. van Houten-Groeneveld, T. Gehrels	NYS	1.8 km	MPC · JPL
145669	2244 T-1	—	March 25, 1971	Palomar	C. J. van Houten, I. van Houten-Groeneveld, T. Gehrels	·	1.9 km	MPC · JPL
145670	4241 T-1	—	March 26, 1971	Palomar	C. J. van Houten, I. van Houten-Groeneveld, T. Gehrels	EUN	2.4 km	MPC · JPL
145671	1073 T-2	—	September 29, 1973	Palomar	C. J. van Houten, I. van Houten-Groeneveld, T. Gehrels	·	2.4 km	MPC · JPL
145672	1321 T-2	—	September 29, 1973	Palomar	C. J. van Houten, I. van Houten-Groeneveld, T. Gehrels	(5)	2.4 km	MPC · JPL
145673	1333 T-2	—	September 29, 1973	Palomar	C. J. van Houten, I. van Houten-Groeneveld, T. Gehrels	·	4.3 km	MPC · JPL
145674	1524 T-2	—	September 29, 1973	Palomar	C. J. van Houten, I. van Houten-Groeneveld, T. Gehrels	MAS	800 m	MPC · JPL
145675	2002 T-2	—	September 29, 1973	Palomar	C. J. van Houten, I. van Houten-Groeneveld, T. Gehrels	·	1.9 km	MPC · JPL
145676	2093 T-2	—	September 29, 1973	Palomar	C. J. van Houten, I. van Houten-Groeneveld, T. Gehrels	·	1.0 km	MPC · JPL
145677	2172 T-2	—	September 29, 1973	Palomar	C. J. van Houten, I. van Houten-Groeneveld, T. Gehrels	EUN	1.9 km	MPC · JPL
145678	2251 T-2	—	September 29, 1973	Palomar	C. J. van Houten, I. van Houten-Groeneveld, T. Gehrels	·	8.5 km	MPC · JPL
145679	2402 T-2	—	September 24, 1973	Palomar	C. J. van Houten, I. van Houten-Groeneveld, T. Gehrels	·	2.0 km	MPC · JPL
145680	3002 T-2	—	September 30, 1973	Palomar	C. J. van Houten, I. van Houten-Groeneveld, T. Gehrels	DOR	4.8 km	MPC · JPL
145681	3018 T-2	—	September 30, 1973	Palomar	C. J. van Houten, I. van Houten-Groeneveld, T. Gehrels	V	1.0 km	MPC · JPL
145682	3131 T-2	—	September 30, 1973	Palomar	C. J. van Houten, I. van Houten-Groeneveld, T. Gehrels	EUN	2.8 km	MPC · JPL
145683	3275 T-2	—	September 30, 1973	Palomar	C. J. van Houten, I. van Houten-Groeneveld, T. Gehrels	·	1.2 km	MPC · JPL
145684	3279 T-2	—	September 30, 1973	Palomar	C. J. van Houten, I. van Houten-Groeneveld, T. Gehrels	·	5.0 km	MPC · JPL
145685	4075 T-2	—	September 29, 1973	Palomar	C. J. van Houten, I. van Houten-Groeneveld, T. Gehrels	KON	2.3 km	MPC · JPL
145686	4077 T-2	—	September 29, 1973	Palomar	C. J. van Houten, I. van Houten-Groeneveld, T. Gehrels	KON · slow	3.1 km	MPC · JPL
145687	1072 T-3	—	October 16, 1977	Palomar	C. J. van Houten, I. van Houten-Groeneveld, T. Gehrels	·	4.4 km	MPC · JPL
145688	2159 T-3	—	October 16, 1977	Palomar	C. J. van Houten, I. van Houten-Groeneveld, T. Gehrels	·	1.3 km	MPC · JPL
145689	2219 T-3	—	October 16, 1977	Palomar	C. J. van Houten, I. van Houten-Groeneveld, T. Gehrels	·	2.8 km	MPC · JPL
145690	2280 T-3	—	October 16, 1977	Palomar	C. J. van Houten, I. van Houten-Groeneveld, T. Gehrels	·	1.6 km	MPC · JPL
145691	2319 T-3	—	October 16, 1977	Palomar	C. J. van Houten, I. van Houten-Groeneveld, T. Gehrels	BRA	2.2 km	MPC · JPL
145692	2625 T-3	—	October 16, 1977	Palomar	C. J. van Houten, I. van Houten-Groeneveld, T. Gehrels	EOS	3.3 km	MPC · JPL
145693	3112 T-3	—	October 16, 1977	Palomar	C. J. van Houten, I. van Houten-Groeneveld, T. Gehrels	NYS	1.6 km	MPC · JPL
145694	3198 T-3	—	October 16, 1977	Palomar	C. J. van Houten, I. van Houten-Groeneveld, T. Gehrels	·	1.8 km	MPC · JPL
145695	3290 T-3	—	October 16, 1977	Palomar	C. J. van Houten, I. van Houten-Groeneveld, T. Gehrels	·	3.6 km	MPC · JPL
145696	3361 T-3	—	October 16, 1977	Palomar	C. J. van Houten, I. van Houten-Groeneveld, T. Gehrels	HYG	4.9 km	MPC · JPL
145697	3394 T-3	—	October 16, 1977	Palomar	C. J. van Houten, I. van Houten-Groeneveld, T. Gehrels	MAS	1.3 km	MPC · JPL
145698	3471 T-3	—	October 16, 1977	Palomar	C. J. van Houten, I. van Houten-Groeneveld, T. Gehrels	·	2.3 km	MPC · JPL
145699	3499 T-3	—	October 16, 1977	Palomar	C. J. van Houten, I. van Houten-Groeneveld, T. Gehrels	(5)	1.7 km	MPC · JPL
145700	4139 T-3	—	October 16, 1977	Palomar	C. J. van Houten, I. van Houten-Groeneveld, T. Gehrels	(5)	2.3 km	MPC · JPL

== 145701–145800 ==
back to top

Designation			Discovery			Properties		Ref
Permanent	Provisional	Named after	Date	Site	Discoverer(s)	Category	Diam.	Ref
145701	4269 T-3	—	October 16, 1977	Palomar	C. J. van Houten, I. van Houten-Groeneveld, T. Gehrels	MAR	1.6 km	MPC · JPL
145702	4274 T-3	—	October 16, 1977	Palomar	C. J. van Houten, I. van Houten-Groeneveld, T. Gehrels	·	1.7 km	MPC · JPL
145703	4389 T-3	—	October 16, 1977	Palomar	C. J. van Houten, I. van Houten-Groeneveld, T. Gehrels	fast	5.8 km	MPC · JPL
145704	4537 T-3	—	October 16, 1977	Palomar	C. J. van Houten, I. van Houten-Groeneveld, T. Gehrels	·	2.2 km	MPC · JPL
145705	5149 T-3	—	October 16, 1977	Palomar	C. J. van Houten, I. van Houten-Groeneveld, T. Gehrels	·	1.2 km	MPC · JPL
145706	1981 EE_{6}	—	March 7, 1981	Siding Spring	S. J. Bus	·	3.3 km	MPC · JPL
145707	1981 EN_{10}	—	March 1, 1981	Siding Spring	S. J. Bus	·	6.9 km	MPC · JPL
145708	1981 EB_{32}	—	March 6, 1981	Siding Spring	S. J. Bus	EOS ·	4.1 km	MPC · JPL
145709 Rocknowar	1981 SK_{9}	Rocknowar	September 28, 1981	Siding Spring	Colombini, E.	EUN	2.3 km	MPC · JPL
145710	1989 SF_{3}	—	September 26, 1989	La Silla	E. W. Elst	·	1.7 km	MPC · JPL
145711	1989 TY_{6}	—	October 7, 1989	La Silla	E. W. Elst	·	1.3 km	MPC · JPL
145712	1991 BQ_{1}	—	January 18, 1991	Haute Provence	E. W. Elst	·	4.2 km	MPC · JPL
145713	1991 TQ_{15}	—	October 6, 1991	Palomar	Lowe, A.	·	1.8 km	MPC · JPL
145714	1992 DK_{7}	—	February 29, 1992	La Silla	UESAC	·	2.4 km	MPC · JPL
145715	1992 DX_{10}	—	February 29, 1992	La Silla	UESAC	·	2.0 km	MPC · JPL
145716	1993 FC_{23}	—	March 21, 1993	La Silla	UESAC	NYS	2.3 km	MPC · JPL
145717	1993 FQ_{41}	—	March 19, 1993	La Silla	UESAC	·	2.5 km	MPC · JPL
145718	1993 FT_{57}	—	March 19, 1993	La Silla	UESAC	3:2 · SHU	7.6 km	MPC · JPL
145719	1993 FG_{81}	—	March 18, 1993	La Silla	UESAC	MAS	1.0 km	MPC · JPL
145720	1993 OX_{7}	—	July 20, 1993	La Silla	E. W. Elst	·	2.3 km	MPC · JPL
145721	1993 PG	—	August 13, 1993	Kitt Peak	Spacewatch	·	6.2 km	MPC · JPL
145722	1993 TZ_{46}	—	October 11, 1993	La Silla	E. W. Elst	·	1.1 km	MPC · JPL
145723	1993 YT	—	December 21, 1993	Oizumi	T. Kobayashi	·	8.1 km	MPC · JPL
145724	1994 AA_{10}	—	January 8, 1994	Kitt Peak	Spacewatch	·	2.7 km	MPC · JPL
145725	1994 CB_{5}	—	February 11, 1994	Kitt Peak	Spacewatch	·	2.2 km	MPC · JPL
145726	1994 GF_{2}	—	April 3, 1994	Kitt Peak	Spacewatch	GEF	1.9 km	MPC · JPL
145727	1994 PL_{29}	—	August 12, 1994	La Silla	E. W. Elst	MAS · slow?	1.5 km	MPC · JPL
145728	1994 RO	—	September 7, 1994	Stroncone	Santa Lucia	·	1.7 km	MPC · JPL
145729	1994 RS_{4}	—	September 5, 1994	Kitt Peak	Spacewatch	·	3.6 km	MPC · JPL
145730	1994 UG_{10}	—	October 28, 1994	Kitt Peak	Spacewatch	·	1.9 km	MPC · JPL
145731	1995 AU	—	January 5, 1995	Oizumi	T. Kobayashi	·	4.6 km	MPC · JPL
145732 Kanmon	1995 DH_{1}	Kanmon	February 21, 1995	Kuma Kogen	A. Nakamura	(5)	2.0 km	MPC · JPL
145733	1995 DL_{5}	—	February 22, 1995	Kitt Peak	Spacewatch	·	1.5 km	MPC · JPL
145734	1995 HT_{2}	—	April 25, 1995	Kitt Peak	Spacewatch	AGN	1.9 km	MPC · JPL
145735	1995 OW_{7}	—	July 25, 1995	Kitt Peak	Spacewatch	·	1.2 km	MPC · JPL
145736	1995 SN_{9}	—	September 17, 1995	Kitt Peak	Spacewatch	·	2.2 km	MPC · JPL
145737	1995 SN_{11}	—	September 18, 1995	Kitt Peak	Spacewatch	·	1.6 km	MPC · JPL
145738	1995 SW_{21}	—	September 19, 1995	Kitt Peak	Spacewatch	·	1.8 km	MPC · JPL
145739	1995 SX_{27}	—	September 19, 1995	Kitt Peak	Spacewatch	·	6.4 km	MPC · JPL
145740	1995 SZ_{68}	—	September 27, 1995	Kitt Peak	Spacewatch	·	4.0 km	MPC · JPL
145741	1995 SM_{70}	—	September 29, 1995	Kitt Peak	Spacewatch	·	2.8 km	MPC · JPL
145742	1995 SV_{74}	—	September 19, 1995	Kitt Peak	Spacewatch	·	1.6 km	MPC · JPL
145743	1995 SN_{77}	—	September 30, 1995	Kitt Peak	Spacewatch	·	3.2 km	MPC · JPL
145744	1995 UV_{10}	—	October 17, 1995	Kitt Peak	Spacewatch	·	1.4 km	MPC · JPL
145745	1995 UT_{13}	—	October 17, 1995	Kitt Peak	Spacewatch	·	1.1 km	MPC · JPL
145746	1995 UR_{18}	—	October 18, 1995	Kitt Peak	Spacewatch	·	1.2 km	MPC · JPL
145747	1995 UF_{39}	—	October 22, 1995	Kitt Peak	Spacewatch	KOR	2.1 km	MPC · JPL
145748	1995 UP_{50}	—	October 17, 1995	Kitt Peak	Spacewatch	·	1.5 km	MPC · JPL
145749	1995 UT_{55}	—	October 23, 1995	Kitt Peak	Spacewatch	·	1.2 km	MPC · JPL
145750	1995 VT_{13}	—	November 15, 1995	Kitt Peak	Spacewatch	·	1.5 km	MPC · JPL
145751	1995 YK_{6}	—	December 16, 1995	Kitt Peak	Spacewatch	·	1.5 km	MPC · JPL
145752	1995 YV_{11}	—	December 18, 1995	Kitt Peak	Spacewatch	·	4.5 km	MPC · JPL
145753	1996 AK_{6}	—	January 12, 1996	Kitt Peak	Spacewatch	NYS	2.6 km	MPC · JPL
145754	1996 HF_{26}	—	April 20, 1996	La Silla	E. W. Elst	·	2.4 km	MPC · JPL
145755	1996 TC_{37}	—	October 12, 1996	Kitt Peak	Spacewatch	·	760 m	MPC · JPL
145756	1996 TZ_{38}	—	October 8, 1996	La Silla	E. W. Elst	·	2.8 km	MPC · JPL
145757	1996 VO_{17}	—	November 6, 1996	Kitt Peak	Spacewatch	·	3.5 km	MPC · JPL
145758	1997 CL_{7}	—	February 1, 1997	Kitt Peak	Spacewatch	·	1.0 km	MPC · JPL
145759	1997 CG_{25}	—	February 6, 1997	Kitt Peak	Spacewatch	·	6.7 km	MPC · JPL
145760	1997 EO_{3}	—	March 2, 1997	Kitt Peak	Spacewatch	·	5.6 km	MPC · JPL
145761	1997 ES_{24}	—	March 5, 1997	Kitt Peak	Spacewatch	·	4.1 km	MPC · JPL
145762	1997 GC_{12}	—	April 3, 1997	Socorro	LINEAR	NYS	1.3 km	MPC · JPL
145763	1997 GS_{14}	—	April 3, 1997	Socorro	LINEAR	·	1.6 km	MPC · JPL
145764	1997 GD_{31}	—	April 12, 1997	Kitt Peak	Spacewatch	THM	3.6 km	MPC · JPL
145765	1997 HR_{3}	—	April 29, 1997	Kitt Peak	Spacewatch	·	1.2 km	MPC · JPL
145766	1997 MX	—	June 26, 1997	Xinglong	SCAP	·	2.7 km	MPC · JPL
145767	1997 PW	—	August 3, 1997	Caussols	ODAS	3:2	6.0 km	MPC · JPL
145768 Petiška	1997 PT_{2}	Petiška	August 12, 1997	Kleť	M. Tichý, Z. Moravec	·	2.1 km	MPC · JPL
145769	1997 SR_{14}	—	September 28, 1997	Kitt Peak	Spacewatch	·	3.2 km	MPC · JPL
145770	1997 TW_{24}	—	October 13, 1997	Modra	A. Galád, Pravda, A.	·	3.3 km	MPC · JPL
145771	1997 VD_{2}	—	November 1, 1997	Oizumi	T. Kobayashi	·	2.3 km	MPC · JPL
145772	1997 WC_{4}	—	November 20, 1997	Kitt Peak	Spacewatch	·	2.4 km	MPC · JPL
145773	1997 WH_{4}	—	November 20, 1997	Kitt Peak	Spacewatch	·	2.1 km	MPC · JPL
145774	1998 BE_{17}	—	January 22, 1998	Kitt Peak	Spacewatch	AGN	2.1 km	MPC · JPL
145775	1998 BE_{20}	—	January 22, 1998	Kitt Peak	Spacewatch	ADE	6.4 km	MPC · JPL
145776	1998 BB_{21}	—	January 22, 1998	Kitt Peak	Spacewatch	·	3.0 km	MPC · JPL
145777	1998 BG_{21}	—	January 22, 1998	Kitt Peak	Spacewatch	·	3.5 km	MPC · JPL
145778	1998 BL_{24}	—	January 26, 1998	Kitt Peak	Spacewatch	·	2.8 km	MPC · JPL
145779	1998 CC	—	February 1, 1998	Modra	L. Kornoš, P. Kolény	·	600 m	MPC · JPL
145780	1998 DG_{8}	—	February 21, 1998	Xinglong	SCAP	HOF	4.4 km	MPC · JPL
145781	1998 FO_{41}	—	March 20, 1998	Socorro	LINEAR	·	4.1 km	MPC · JPL
145782 Mattiabaraldi	1998 FE_{74}	Mattiabaraldi	March 29, 1998	Bologna	Colombini, E.	·	2.8 km	MPC · JPL
145783	1998 KF	—	May 16, 1998	Kitt Peak	Spacewatch	·	4.9 km	MPC · JPL
145784	1998 KY_{3}	—	May 22, 1998	Anderson Mesa	LONEOS	PHO	2.1 km	MPC · JPL
145785	1998 MO_{33}	—	June 24, 1998	Socorro	LINEAR	·	2.3 km	MPC · JPL
145786	1998 OT_{11}	—	July 26, 1998	La Silla	E. W. Elst	·	2.0 km	MPC · JPL
145787	1998 QH_{4}	—	August 18, 1998	Reedy Creek	J. Broughton	NYS	2.0 km	MPC · JPL
145788	1998 QZ_{18}	—	August 17, 1998	Socorro	LINEAR	·	5.1 km	MPC · JPL
145789	1998 QJ_{31}	—	August 17, 1998	Socorro	LINEAR	·	1.8 km	MPC · JPL
145790	1998 QE_{36}	—	August 17, 1998	Socorro	LINEAR	V	1.4 km	MPC · JPL
145791	1998 QM_{77}	—	August 24, 1998	Socorro	LINEAR	·	3.0 km	MPC · JPL
145792	1998 QV_{83}	—	August 24, 1998	Socorro	LINEAR	·	1.9 km	MPC · JPL
145793	1998 QX_{96}	—	August 19, 1998	Socorro	LINEAR	·	2.1 km	MPC · JPL
145794	1998 QJ_{109}	—	August 17, 1998	Socorro	LINEAR	·	2.3 km	MPC · JPL
145795	1998 RA_{16}	—	September 14, 1998	Xinglong	SCAP	NYS	3.0 km	MPC · JPL
145796	1998 RM_{22}	—	September 14, 1998	Socorro	LINEAR	·	1.9 km	MPC · JPL
145797	1998 RB_{23}	—	September 14, 1998	Socorro	LINEAR	·	2.3 km	MPC · JPL
145798	1998 RA_{30}	—	September 14, 1998	Socorro	LINEAR	NYS	3.0 km	MPC · JPL
145799	1998 RE_{51}	—	September 14, 1998	Socorro	LINEAR	·	1.8 km	MPC · JPL
145800	1998 RY_{59}	—	September 14, 1998	Socorro	LINEAR	·	1.9 km	MPC · JPL

== 145801–145900 ==
back to top

Designation			Discovery			Properties		Ref
Permanent	Provisional	Named after	Date	Site	Discoverer(s)	Category	Diam.	Ref
145801	1998 RF_{80}	—	September 14, 1998	Socorro	LINEAR	·	2.7 km	MPC · JPL
145802	1998 SC_{9}	—	September 20, 1998	Kitt Peak	Spacewatch	·	2.6 km	MPC · JPL
145803	1998 SW_{12}	—	September 23, 1998	Catalina	CSS	·	2.8 km	MPC · JPL
145804	1998 SX_{41}	—	September 26, 1998	Kitt Peak	Spacewatch	MAS	930 m	MPC · JPL
145805	1998 SC_{42}	—	September 26, 1998	Kitt Peak	Spacewatch	V	1.2 km	MPC · JPL
145806	1998 SA_{77}	—	September 26, 1998	Socorro	LINEAR	T_{j} (2.97)	7.5 km	MPC · JPL
145807	1998 SU_{77}	—	September 26, 1998	Socorro	LINEAR	·	2.5 km	MPC · JPL
145808	1998 SQ_{83}	—	September 26, 1998	Socorro	LINEAR	NYS	2.5 km	MPC · JPL
145809	1998 SF_{84}	—	September 26, 1998	Socorro	LINEAR	MAS	1.2 km	MPC · JPL
145810	1998 SR_{86}	—	September 26, 1998	Socorro	LINEAR	NYS	2.5 km	MPC · JPL
145811	1998 ST_{104}	—	September 26, 1998	Socorro	LINEAR	·	1.9 km	MPC · JPL
145812	1998 SX_{115}	—	September 26, 1998	Socorro	LINEAR	·	2.6 km	MPC · JPL
145813	1998 SJ_{125}	—	September 26, 1998	Socorro	LINEAR	·	3.4 km	MPC · JPL
145814	1998 SD_{140}	—	September 26, 1998	Socorro	LINEAR	·	1.7 km	MPC · JPL
145815	1998 SN_{149}	—	September 26, 1998	Socorro	LINEAR	·	1.7 km	MPC · JPL
145816	1998 SC_{152}	—	September 26, 1998	Socorro	LINEAR	MAS	1.4 km	MPC · JPL
145817	1998 SQ_{161}	—	September 26, 1998	Socorro	LINEAR	·	2.2 km	MPC · JPL
145818	1998 SF_{170}	—	September 19, 1998	Anderson Mesa	LONEOS	·	1.9 km	MPC · JPL
145819	1998 TB_{2}	—	October 12, 1998	Caussols	ODAS	·	2.0 km	MPC · JPL
145820 Valeromeo	1998 TL_{7}	Valeromeo	October 15, 1998	Ceccano	G. Masi	NYS	2.2 km	MPC · JPL
145821	1998 TK_{12}	—	October 13, 1998	Kitt Peak	Spacewatch	·	2.0 km	MPC · JPL
145822	1998 TW_{18}	—	October 14, 1998	Xinglong	SCAP	·	2.3 km	MPC · JPL
145823	1998 UH_{1}	—	October 19, 1998	Catalina	CSS	H	1.0 km	MPC · JPL
145824	1998 UP_{34}	—	October 28, 1998	Socorro	LINEAR	·	1.9 km	MPC · JPL
145825	1998 UE_{42}	—	October 28, 1998	Socorro	LINEAR	·	1.2 km	MPC · JPL
145826	1998 UP_{45}	—	October 23, 1998	Xinglong	SCAP	MAS	930 m	MPC · JPL
145827	1998 VA_{7}	—	November 10, 1998	Socorro	LINEAR	·	3.2 km	MPC · JPL
145828	1998 VS_{25}	—	November 10, 1998	Socorro	LINEAR	MAS	1.4 km	MPC · JPL
145829	1998 VC_{42}	—	November 15, 1998	Kitt Peak	Spacewatch	·	1.6 km	MPC · JPL
145830	1998 VY_{56}	—	November 15, 1998	Kitt Peak	Spacewatch	·	1.7 km	MPC · JPL
145831	1998 VB_{57}	—	November 14, 1998	Socorro	LINEAR	·	4.6 km	MPC · JPL
145832	1998 WG_{31}	—	November 19, 1998	Catalina	CSS	H	1.3 km	MPC · JPL
145833	1998 WY_{37}	—	November 21, 1998	Kitt Peak	Spacewatch	3:2 · SHU	10 km	MPC · JPL
145834	1998 WH_{39}	—	November 21, 1998	Kitt Peak	Spacewatch	·	1.7 km	MPC · JPL
145835	1998 XW_{23}	—	December 11, 1998	Kitt Peak	Spacewatch	·	2.1 km	MPC · JPL
145836	1998 XE_{63}	—	December 14, 1998	Socorro	LINEAR	·	4.9 km	MPC · JPL
145837	1998 YZ_{2}	—	December 16, 1998	Uenohara	N. Kawasato	NYS	2.0 km	MPC · JPL
145838	1998 YF_{11}	—	December 18, 1998	Caussols	ODAS	MIS	4.8 km	MPC · JPL
145839	1998 YK_{12}	—	December 23, 1998	Goodricke-Pigott	R. A. Tucker	H	1.2 km	MPC · JPL
145840	1998 YW_{18}	—	December 25, 1998	Kitt Peak	Spacewatch	·	2.4 km	MPC · JPL
145841	1998 YH_{20}	—	December 25, 1998	Kitt Peak	Spacewatch	3:2	6.7 km	MPC · JPL
145842	1999 AL_{6}	—	January 15, 1999	Kitt Peak	Spacewatch	MRX	1.9 km	MPC · JPL
145843	1999 AD_{10}	—	January 13, 1999	Višnjan Observatory	K. Korlević	3:2	8.8 km	MPC · JPL
145844	1999 AG_{26}	—	January 9, 1999	Uenohara	N. Kawasato	·	2.0 km	MPC · JPL
145845	1999 BS_{26}	—	January 16, 1999	Kitt Peak	Spacewatch	(5)	1.8 km	MPC · JPL
145846	1999 CC_{13}	—	February 14, 1999	Caussols	ODAS	·	2.3 km	MPC · JPL
145847	1999 CQ_{13}	—	February 14, 1999	Caussols	ODAS	·	2.9 km	MPC · JPL
145848	1999 CP_{36}	—	February 10, 1999	Socorro	LINEAR	·	2.7 km	MPC · JPL
145849	1999 CE_{43}	—	February 10, 1999	Socorro	LINEAR	·	1.6 km	MPC · JPL
145850	1999 CA_{66}	—	February 12, 1999	Socorro	LINEAR	EUN	2.4 km	MPC · JPL
145851	1999 CS_{69}	—	February 12, 1999	Socorro	LINEAR	EUN	1.8 km	MPC · JPL
145852	1999 CN_{93}	—	February 10, 1999	Socorro	LINEAR	·	3.7 km	MPC · JPL
145853	1999 CX_{97}	—	February 10, 1999	Socorro	LINEAR	·	3.2 km	MPC · JPL
145854	1999 CS_{98}	—	February 10, 1999	Socorro	LINEAR	·	2.4 km	MPC · JPL
145855	1999 CV_{105}	—	February 12, 1999	Socorro	LINEAR	(5)	2.6 km	MPC · JPL
145856	1999 CY_{114}	—	February 12, 1999	Socorro	LINEAR	(5)	1.9 km	MPC · JPL
145857	1999 EY_{2}	—	March 10, 1999	Socorro	LINEAR	·	1.6 km	MPC · JPL
145858	1999 EM_{8}	—	March 14, 1999	Kitt Peak	Spacewatch	·	2.3 km	MPC · JPL
145859	1999 JH_{135}	—	May 12, 1999	Socorro	LINEAR	·	3.3 km	MPC · JPL
145860	1999 KO_{3}	—	May 17, 1999	Kitt Peak	Spacewatch	KOR	2.2 km	MPC · JPL
145861	1999 LF_{1}	—	June 7, 1999	Socorro	LINEAR	PAL	5.5 km	MPC · JPL
145862	1999 ML_{2}	—	June 22, 1999	Catalina	CSS	·	1.4 km	MPC · JPL
145863	1999 NT_{15}	—	July 14, 1999	Socorro	LINEAR	·	4.4 km	MPC · JPL
145864	1999 NE_{41}	—	July 14, 1999	Socorro	LINEAR	·	6.5 km	MPC · JPL
145865	1999 RC_{4}	—	September 4, 1999	Catalina	CSS	·	1.2 km	MPC · JPL
145866	1999 RL_{55}	—	September 7, 1999	Socorro	LINEAR	·	4.9 km	MPC · JPL
145867	1999 RJ_{131}	—	September 9, 1999	Socorro	LINEAR	·	1.8 km	MPC · JPL
145868	1999 RA_{138}	—	September 9, 1999	Socorro	LINEAR	·	1.3 km	MPC · JPL
145869	1999 RQ_{140}	—	September 9, 1999	Socorro	LINEAR	·	1.3 km	MPC · JPL
145870	1999 RU_{179}	—	September 9, 1999	Socorro	LINEAR	·	1.2 km	MPC · JPL
145871	1999 RJ_{186}	—	September 9, 1999	Socorro	LINEAR	·	1.4 km	MPC · JPL
145872	1999 RB_{214}	—	September 13, 1999	Kitt Peak	Spacewatch	THM	4.5 km	MPC · JPL
145873	1999 RA_{219}	—	September 5, 1999	Anderson Mesa	LONEOS	·	2.1 km	MPC · JPL
145874	1999 RY_{236}	—	September 8, 1999	Catalina	CSS	·	1.1 km	MPC · JPL
145875	1999 RV_{249}	—	September 6, 1999	Kitt Peak	Spacewatch	·	4.5 km	MPC · JPL
145876	1999 RF_{259}	—	September 4, 1999	Anderson Mesa	LONEOS	(2076)	1.6 km	MPC · JPL
145877	1999 SP_{11}	—	September 30, 1999	Catalina	CSS	·	1.2 km	MPC · JPL
145878	1999 SS_{14}	—	September 29, 1999	Catalina	CSS	·	3.1 km	MPC · JPL
145879	1999 SW_{21}	—	September 18, 1999	Kitt Peak	Spacewatch	·	4.4 km	MPC · JPL
145880	1999 TE	—	October 1, 1999	High Point	D. K. Chesney	·	1.3 km	MPC · JPL
145881	1999 TC_{32}	—	October 4, 1999	Socorro	LINEAR	·	1.6 km	MPC · JPL
145882	1999 TU_{32}	—	October 4, 1999	Socorro	LINEAR	·	1.3 km	MPC · JPL
145883	1999 TT_{51}	—	October 4, 1999	Kitt Peak	Spacewatch	V	850 m	MPC · JPL
145884	1999 TY_{83}	—	October 13, 1999	Kitt Peak	Spacewatch	HYG	4.0 km	MPC · JPL
145885	1999 TF_{87}	—	October 15, 1999	Kitt Peak	Spacewatch	·	960 m	MPC · JPL
145886	1999 TY_{98}	—	October 2, 1999	Socorro	LINEAR	·	1.6 km	MPC · JPL
145887	1999 TM_{100}	—	October 2, 1999	Socorro	LINEAR	·	1.4 km	MPC · JPL
145888	1999 TT_{103}	—	October 3, 1999	Socorro	LINEAR	·	1.5 km	MPC · JPL
145889	1999 TC_{125}	—	October 4, 1999	Socorro	LINEAR	·	1.2 km	MPC · JPL
145890	1999 TP_{139}	—	October 6, 1999	Socorro	LINEAR	·	1.0 km	MPC · JPL
145891	1999 TS_{147}	—	October 7, 1999	Socorro	LINEAR	·	1.2 km	MPC · JPL
145892	1999 TD_{151}	—	October 15, 1999	Socorro	LINEAR	·	860 m	MPC · JPL
145893	1999 TG_{165}	—	October 10, 1999	Socorro	LINEAR	·	1.3 km	MPC · JPL
145894	1999 TF_{167}	—	October 10, 1999	Socorro	LINEAR	VER	6.1 km	MPC · JPL
145895	1999 TA_{169}	—	October 10, 1999	Socorro	LINEAR	·	1.1 km	MPC · JPL
145896	1999 TF_{190}	—	October 12, 1999	Socorro	LINEAR	·	2.9 km	MPC · JPL
145897	1999 TT_{191}	—	October 12, 1999	Socorro	LINEAR	·	1.4 km	MPC · JPL
145898	1999 TT_{192}	—	October 12, 1999	Socorro	LINEAR	·	1.4 km	MPC · JPL
145899	1999 TT_{197}	—	October 12, 1999	Socorro	LINEAR	·	1.3 km	MPC · JPL
145900	1999 TO_{219}	—	October 1, 1999	Catalina	CSS	·	1.2 km	MPC · JPL

== 145901–146000 ==
back to top

Designation			Discovery			Properties		Ref
Permanent	Provisional	Named after	Date	Site	Discoverer(s)	Category	Diam.	Ref
145901	1999 TV_{237}	—	October 4, 1999	Kitt Peak	Spacewatch	·	990 m	MPC · JPL
145902	1999 TF_{239}	—	October 4, 1999	Catalina	CSS	·	940 m	MPC · JPL
145903	1999 TK_{248}	—	October 8, 1999	Catalina	CSS	·	1.6 km	MPC · JPL
145904	1999 TK_{250}	—	October 9, 1999	Catalina	CSS	·	7.2 km	MPC · JPL
145905	1999 TK_{266}	—	October 3, 1999	Socorro	LINEAR	·	1.3 km	MPC · JPL
145906	1999 TE_{269}	—	October 3, 1999	Socorro	LINEAR	·	1.5 km	MPC · JPL
145907	1999 TX_{272}	—	October 3, 1999	Socorro	LINEAR	·	1.4 km	MPC · JPL
145908	1999 TO_{297}	—	October 2, 1999	Kitt Peak	Spacewatch	·	4.2 km	MPC · JPL
145909	1999 TR_{320}	—	October 10, 1999	Socorro	LINEAR	·	1.5 km	MPC · JPL
145910	1999 UB	—	October 16, 1999	Ondřejov	P. Kušnirák, P. Pravec	·	1.4 km	MPC · JPL
145911	1999 UT_{9}	—	October 31, 1999	Socorro	LINEAR	PHO	1.9 km	MPC · JPL
145912	1999 UX_{19}	—	October 31, 1999	Kitt Peak	Spacewatch	·	930 m	MPC · JPL
145913	1999 US_{24}	—	October 28, 1999	Catalina	CSS	·	1.4 km	MPC · JPL
145914	1999 UE_{25}	—	October 28, 1999	Catalina	CSS	·	1.3 km	MPC · JPL
145915	1999 UP_{38}	—	October 29, 1999	Anderson Mesa	LONEOS	·	1.6 km	MPC · JPL
145916	1999 UK_{47}	—	October 29, 1999	Kitt Peak	Spacewatch	(2076)	1.2 km	MPC · JPL
145917	1999 VT_{34}	—	November 3, 1999	Socorro	LINEAR	·	1.3 km	MPC · JPL
145918	1999 VC_{77}	—	November 5, 1999	Kitt Peak	Spacewatch	·	1.1 km	MPC · JPL
145919	1999 VF_{104}	—	November 9, 1999	Socorro	LINEAR	·	1.3 km	MPC · JPL
145920	1999 VW_{129}	—	November 11, 1999	Kitt Peak	Spacewatch	·	1.2 km	MPC · JPL
145921	1999 VT_{137}	—	November 12, 1999	Socorro	LINEAR	·	2.0 km	MPC · JPL
145922	1999 VZ_{138}	—	November 9, 1999	Kitt Peak	Spacewatch	·	1.1 km	MPC · JPL
145923	1999 VY_{160}	—	November 14, 1999	Socorro	LINEAR	V	780 m	MPC · JPL
145924	1999 VY_{189}	—	November 15, 1999	Socorro	LINEAR	·	1.2 km	MPC · JPL
145925	1999 VJ_{201}	—	November 3, 1999	Socorro	LINEAR	·	1.0 km	MPC · JPL
145926	1999 VP_{216}	—	November 4, 1999	Socorro	LINEAR	·	1.4 km	MPC · JPL
145927	1999 VW_{228}	—	November 3, 1999	Socorro	LINEAR	·	1.2 km	MPC · JPL
145928	1999 WX_{11}	—	November 28, 1999	Kitt Peak	Spacewatch	NYS	1.4 km	MPC · JPL
145929	1999 WJ_{12}	—	November 28, 1999	Kitt Peak	Spacewatch	·	1.2 km	MPC · JPL
145930	1999 WK_{12}	—	November 28, 1999	Kitt Peak	Spacewatch	·	1.5 km	MPC · JPL
145931	1999 XO_{5}	—	December 4, 1999	Catalina	CSS	fast	1.2 km	MPC · JPL
145932	1999 XQ_{16}	—	December 7, 1999	Socorro	LINEAR	·	1.8 km	MPC · JPL
145933	1999 XG_{17}	—	December 7, 1999	Socorro	LINEAR	PHO	1.7 km	MPC · JPL
145934	1999 XT_{41}	—	December 7, 1999	Socorro	LINEAR	V	1.2 km	MPC · JPL
145935	1999 XN_{43}	—	December 7, 1999	Socorro	LINEAR	BAP	1.3 km	MPC · JPL
145936	1999 XK_{46}	—	December 7, 1999	Socorro	LINEAR	·	890 m	MPC · JPL
145937	1999 XS_{47}	—	December 7, 1999	Socorro	LINEAR	·	1.2 km	MPC · JPL
145938	1999 XW_{51}	—	December 7, 1999	Socorro	LINEAR	·	1.6 km	MPC · JPL
145939	1999 XF_{61}	—	December 7, 1999	Socorro	LINEAR	·	1.5 km	MPC · JPL
145940	1999 XR_{62}	—	December 7, 1999	Socorro	LINEAR	·	1.4 km	MPC · JPL
145941	1999 XB_{81}	—	December 7, 1999	Socorro	LINEAR	·	2.2 km	MPC · JPL
145942	1999 XC_{82}	—	December 7, 1999	Socorro	LINEAR	NYS	1.4 km	MPC · JPL
145943	1999 XG_{89}	—	December 7, 1999	Socorro	LINEAR	·	1.7 km	MPC · JPL
145944	1999 XR_{125}	—	December 7, 1999	Catalina	CSS	(2076)	1.5 km	MPC · JPL
145945	1999 XF_{127}	—	December 9, 1999	Fountain Hills	C. W. Juels	·	2.1 km	MPC · JPL
145946	1999 XL_{151}	—	December 7, 1999	Kitt Peak	Spacewatch	·	1.9 km	MPC · JPL
145947	1999 XZ_{177}	—	December 10, 1999	Socorro	LINEAR	·	2.1 km	MPC · JPL
145948	1999 XV_{190}	—	December 12, 1999	Socorro	LINEAR	·	1.4 km	MPC · JPL
145949	1999 XD_{191}	—	December 12, 1999	Socorro	LINEAR	·	1.4 km	MPC · JPL
145950	1999 XZ_{198}	—	December 12, 1999	Socorro	LINEAR	·	1.3 km	MPC · JPL
145951	1999 XL_{200}	—	December 12, 1999	Socorro	LINEAR	·	1.9 km	MPC · JPL
145952	1999 XL_{201}	—	December 12, 1999	Socorro	LINEAR	·	1.7 km	MPC · JPL
145953	1999 XN_{217}	—	December 13, 1999	Kitt Peak	Spacewatch	·	2.4 km	MPC · JPL
145954	1999 XW_{217}	—	December 13, 1999	Kitt Peak	Spacewatch	NYS	2.2 km	MPC · JPL
145955	1999 XE_{227}	—	December 15, 1999	Kitt Peak	Spacewatch	MAS	1.1 km	MPC · JPL
145956	1999 XJ_{234}	—	December 4, 1999	Anderson Mesa	LONEOS	·	1.5 km	MPC · JPL
145957	1999 XK_{245}	—	December 5, 1999	Socorro	LINEAR	(2076)	1.4 km	MPC · JPL
145958	1999 XB_{248}	—	December 6, 1999	Socorro	LINEAR	(2076)	1.3 km	MPC · JPL
145959	1999 XL_{248}	—	December 6, 1999	Socorro	LINEAR	·	1.2 km	MPC · JPL
145960	1999 XV_{255}	—	December 5, 1999	Kitt Peak	Spacewatch	3:2 · SHU	7.1 km	MPC · JPL
145961	1999 XC_{265}	—	December 9, 1999	Kitt Peak	Spacewatch	·	1.7 km	MPC · JPL
145962 Lacchini	1999 YH_{5}	Lacchini	December 29, 1999	Colleverde	V. S. Casulli	·	2.2 km	MPC · JPL
145963	1999 YC_{7}	—	December 30, 1999	Socorro	LINEAR	·	2.0 km	MPC · JPL
145964	1999 YY_{7}	—	December 27, 1999	Kitt Peak	Spacewatch	·	1.8 km	MPC · JPL
145965	1999 YM_{8}	—	December 27, 1999	Kitt Peak	Spacewatch	MAS	910 m	MPC · JPL
145966 Alessandroilari	1999 YM_{16}	Alessandroilari	December 30, 1999	San Marcello	M. Tombelli, A. Boattini	·	1.4 km	MPC · JPL
145967	2000 AZ_{28}	—	January 3, 2000	Socorro	LINEAR	V	1.1 km	MPC · JPL
145968	2000 AM_{31}	—	January 3, 2000	Socorro	LINEAR	·	1.8 km	MPC · JPL
145969	2000 AP_{32}	—	January 3, 2000	Socorro	LINEAR	NYS	1.3 km	MPC · JPL
145970	2000 AA_{34}	—	January 3, 2000	Socorro	LINEAR	NYS	2.0 km	MPC · JPL
145971	2000 AG_{38}	—	January 3, 2000	Socorro	LINEAR	fast	1.5 km	MPC · JPL
145972	2000 AH_{39}	—	January 3, 2000	Socorro	LINEAR	V	1.5 km	MPC · JPL
145973	2000 AR_{43}	—	January 2, 2000	Kitt Peak	Spacewatch	MAS	880 m	MPC · JPL
145974	2000 AK_{55}	—	January 4, 2000	Socorro	LINEAR	·	2.1 km	MPC · JPL
145975	2000 AF_{57}	—	January 4, 2000	Socorro	LINEAR	·	2.6 km	MPC · JPL
145976	2000 AR_{65}	—	January 4, 2000	Socorro	LINEAR	·	2.6 km	MPC · JPL
145977	2000 AS_{85}	—	January 5, 2000	Socorro	LINEAR	·	1.5 km	MPC · JPL
145978	2000 AT_{92}	—	January 2, 2000	Socorro	LINEAR	PHO	2.2 km	MPC · JPL
145979	2000 AO_{112}	—	January 5, 2000	Socorro	LINEAR	·	1.2 km	MPC · JPL
145980	2000 AZ_{152}	—	January 8, 2000	Socorro	LINEAR	·	3.8 km	MPC · JPL
145981	2000 AF_{159}	—	January 3, 2000	Socorro	LINEAR	·	1.7 km	MPC · JPL
145982	2000 AG_{161}	—	January 3, 2000	Socorro	LINEAR	·	2.1 km	MPC · JPL
145983	2000 AH_{162}	—	January 4, 2000	Socorro	LINEAR	·	1.9 km	MPC · JPL
145984	2000 AG_{214}	—	January 6, 2000	Kitt Peak	Spacewatch	·	1.1 km	MPC · JPL
145985	2000 AJ_{215}	—	January 7, 2000	Kitt Peak	Spacewatch	NYS	2.0 km	MPC · JPL
145986	2000 AF_{225}	—	January 11, 2000	Kitt Peak	Spacewatch	NYS	1.5 km	MPC · JPL
145987	2000 AN_{228}	—	January 13, 2000	Kitt Peak	Spacewatch	(2076)	1.6 km	MPC · JPL
145988	2000 BC_{4}	—	January 26, 2000	Gnosca	S. Sposetti	·	1.6 km	MPC · JPL
145989	2000 BL_{15}	—	January 30, 2000	Tebbutt	F. B. Zoltowski	·	2.0 km	MPC · JPL
145990	2000 BE_{21}	—	January 29, 2000	Kitt Peak	Spacewatch	·	1.3 km	MPC · JPL
145991	2000 BA_{34}	—	January 30, 2000	Catalina	CSS	·	2.4 km	MPC · JPL
145992	2000 CY_{9}	—	February 2, 2000	Socorro	LINEAR	NYS	1.6 km	MPC · JPL
145993	2000 CA_{10}	—	February 2, 2000	Socorro	LINEAR	·	1.3 km	MPC · JPL
145994	2000 CL_{12}	—	February 2, 2000	Socorro	LINEAR	(2076)	1.7 km	MPC · JPL
145995	2000 CQ_{17}	—	February 2, 2000	Socorro	LINEAR	NYS	1.6 km	MPC · JPL
145996	2000 CU_{20}	—	February 2, 2000	Socorro	LINEAR	·	2.1 km	MPC · JPL
145997	2000 CE_{22}	—	February 2, 2000	Socorro	LINEAR	NYS	1.3 km	MPC · JPL
145998	2000 CE_{23}	—	February 2, 2000	Socorro	LINEAR	V	1.1 km	MPC · JPL
145999	2000 CV_{30}	—	February 2, 2000	Socorro	LINEAR	MAS	1.1 km	MPC · JPL
146000	2000 CZ_{40}	—	February 2, 2000	Socorro	LINEAR	PHO	2.5 km	MPC · JPL

back to top

== See also ==
- Meanings of minor-planet names: 145001–146000
