= Meanings of minor-planet names: 145001–146000 =

As minor planet discoveries are confirmed, they are given a permanent number by the IAU's Minor Planet Center (MPC), and the discoverers can then submit names for them, following the IAU's naming conventions. The list below concerns those minor planets in the specified number-range that have received names, and explains the meanings of those names.

Official naming citations of newly named small Solar System bodies are approved and published in a bulletin by IAU's Working Group for Small Bodies Nomenclature (WGSBN). Before May 2021, citations were published in MPC's Minor Planet Circulars for many decades. Recent citations can also be found on the JPL Small-Body Database (SBDB). Until his death in 2016, German astronomer Lutz D. Schmadel compiled these citations into the Dictionary of Minor Planet Names (DMP) and regularly updated the collection.

Based on Paul Herget's The Names of the Minor Planets, Schmadel also researched the unclear origin of numerous asteroids, most of which had been named prior to World War II. This article incorporates text from this source, which is in the public domain: SBDB New namings may only be added to this list below after official publication as the preannouncement of names is condemned. The WGSBN publishes a comprehensive guideline for the naming rules of non-cometary small Solar System bodies.

== 145001–145100 ==
Named minor planet	Provisional	This minor planet was named for...	Ref · Catalog
145062 Hashikami	2005 GS_{22}	Hashikami, Japan, the hometown of the father of the discoverer, Kin Endate	JPL · 145062
145075 Zipernowsky	2005 GV_{33}	Károly Zipernowsky (1853–1942), a Hungarian electrical engineer and a pioneer of AC technologies	MPC · 145075
145078 Katherinejohnson	2005 GO_{39}	Katherine Johnson (1918–2020) was a trailblazing African-American mathematician and scientist. She is renowned for her work at NASA on orbital mechanics calculations supporting the success of several early crewed spaceflight programs including Mercury and Apollo.	IAU · 145078

== 145101–145200 ==
back to top

Named minor planet	Provisional	This minor planet was named for...	Ref · Catalog
145166 Leojematt	2005 JL	Leo Rodriguez (born 2021), Jemma Osmonson (born 2021) and Matthew Young (born 2021) are great-grandchildren of American astronomer James Whitney Young, who discovered this minor planet.	IAU · 145166
145174 Irenejoliotcurie	2005 JC_{5}	Irène Joliot-Curie (1897–1956) was a French chemist and physicist. With her husband Frédéric Joliot-Curie, she shared the 1935 Nobel Prize in Chemistry for the discovery of induced radioactivity	IAU · 145174

== 145201–145300 ==
back to top

Named minor planet	Provisional	This minor planet was named for...	Ref · Catalog
There are no named minor planets in this number range

== 145301–145400 ==
back to top

Named minor planet	Provisional	This minor planet was named for...	Ref · Catalog
There are no named minor planets in this number range

== 145401–145500 ==
back to top

Named minor planet	Provisional	This minor planet was named for...	Ref · Catalog
145445 Le Floch	2005 RS	Jean-Christophe Le Floch (born 1965), French amateur astronomer who observes at the observatories of Bordeaux, Meudon, Haute-Provence and Pic du Midi.	JPL · 145445
145451 Rumina	2005 RM_{43}	Rumina, a minor Roman goddess invoked as a protector of nursing mothers.	IAU · 145451
145452 Ritona	2005 RN_{43}	Ritona, a Celtic goddess of river fords.	IAU · 145452
145456 Sab	2005 SA_{5}	The Burgundy Astronomical Society (French: Société Astronomique de Bourgogne). SAB was founded in 1975 to bring astronomy enthusiasts together and make the science known to as many people.	IAU · 145456
145475 Rehoboth	2005 TP_{52}	Rehoboth Christian School, New Mexico, whose campus is the site of the Calvin-Rehoboth Robotic Observatory (the discovery site).	JPL · 145475
145488 Kaczendre	2005 VP_{3}	Endre Kacz Komáromi (1880–1969) was a Hungarian painter and amateur astronomer. From the 1910s, he had permanent exhibitions in Budapest and several of his paintings can be found in the Hungarian National Gallery. His colorful drawings of planets are unique, and he was an independent discoverer of N Aql 1918.	JPL · 145488
145491 Larakaufmann	2005 VX_{108}	Lara L. Kaufmann (b. 1967) is Executive Director of the Greenville (South Carolina) Chautauqua Society, which provides cultural enrichment and enhanced community harmony over a broad geographic area.	IAU · 145491

== 145501–145600 ==
back to top

Named minor planet	Provisional	This minor planet was named for...	Ref · Catalog
145523 Lulin	2006 EM_{67}	Lulin mountain, Taiwan, where the discovery site (the National Central University Lu-Lin Observatory) is located	JPL · 145523
145534 Jhongda	2006 GJ	Jhongda, in Mandarin Chinese an abbreviation for "Central University", which built and operates the discovery site (the National Central University Lu-Lin Observatory)	JPL · 145534
145545 Wensayling	2006 KA_{39}	Sayling Wen (1948–2003), Chinese educator and promoter for social work	JPL · 145545
145546 Suiqizhong	2006 KU_{67}	Guangzhou Middle School, in Guangzhou, China, where the co-discoverer of this minor planet, Ye Quan-Zhi, has studied	JPL · 145546
145558 Raiatea	2006 OR	The island of Raiatea in French Polynesia, the first of the Polynesian islands to be inhabited	JPL · 145558
145559 Didiermüller	2006 OO_{1}	Didier Müller (born 1967), a Swiss math and computer science teacher, who has written several books on science popularization (Src, HP)	JPL · 145559
145562 Zurbriggen	2006 OY_{6}	Bernard Zurbriggen (born 1943), Swiss emeritus professor of natural science, director of the Observatory Naef Épendes, where this minor planet was discovered	JPL · 145562
145566 Andreasphilipp	2006 ON_{10}	Andreas Philipp (born 1965), German amateur astronomer and founder of the Schurwaldsternwarte in Aichwald	JPL · 145566
145588 Sudongpo	2006 PQ_{17}	Su Shi (1037–1101), a Chinese writer, poet, painter, calligrapher, who composed numerous poems	JPL · 145588
145593 Xántus	2006 QE_{1}	János Xántus (1825–1894), a Hungarian scientist, traveler, ethnographer and a member of the Hungarian Academy of Sciences.	JPL · 145593

== 145601–145700 ==
back to top

Named minor planet	Provisional	This minor planet was named for...	Ref · Catalog
There are no named minor planets in this number range

== 145701–145800 ==
back to top

Named minor planet	Provisional	This minor planet was named for...	Ref · Catalog
145709 Rocknowar	1981 SK_{9}	"Rock No War", an international humanitarian aid organization of volunteers for children. It is based in Formigine, Italy, and was founded in 1998.	JPL · 145709
145732 Kanmon	1995 DH_{1}	Kanmon Straits (Kanmon-kaikyō) in Japan, a strait separating the main islands of Honshu and Kyushu	JPL · 145732
145768 Petiška	1997 PT_{2}	Eduard Petiška (1924–1987), a Czech poet, novelist, short story writer, playwright and translator	JPL · 145768
145782 Mattiabaraldi	1998 FE_{74}	Mattia Baraldi, Italian industrial expert with expertise in quality control, who is curious about the sky. He is the son-in-law of the discoverer of this minor planet.	IAU · 145782

== 145801–145900 ==
back to top

Named minor planet	Provisional	This minor planet was named for...	Ref · Catalog
145820 Valeromeo	1998 TL_{7}	Valentina Romeo (born 1980), Italian singer and friend of the discoverer Gianluca Masi	JPL · 145820

== 145901–146000 ==
back to top

Named minor planet	Provisional	This minor planet was named for...	Ref · Catalog
145962 Lacchini	1999 YH_{5}	Giovanni Battista Lacchini (1884–1967), an Italian astronomer, noted for his work on variable stars.	JPL · 145962
145966 Alessandroilari	1999 YM_{16}	Alessandro Ilari, Italian amateur astronomer.	IAU · 145966

back to top

Preceded by 144,001–145,000	Meanings of minor-planet names List of minor planets: 145,001–146,000	Succeeded by 146,001–147,000
