= 145523 Lulin =

Main-belt asteroid

Discovery
- Discovered by: H.-C. Lin; Q.-Z. Ye
- Discovery site: Lulin Obs.
- Discovery date: 7 March 2006

Designations
- Named after: Lulin Mountains (observatory site)
- Alternative designations: 2006 EM_{67}
- Minor planet category: main-belt · (middle) background

Orbital characteristics
- Epoch 27 April 2019 (JD 2458600.5)
- Uncertainty parameter 0
- Observation arc: 25.72 yr (9,396 d)
- Aphelion: 3.2484 AU
- Perihelion: 2.2468 AU
- Semi-major axis: 2.7476 AU
- Eccentricity: 0.1823
- Orbital period (sidereal): 4.55 yr (1,664 d)
- Mean anomaly: 273.09°
- Mean motion: 0° 12^{m} 59.04^{s} / day
- Inclination: 10.867°
- Longitude of ascending node: 345.22°
- Argument of perihelion: 273.12°

Physical characteristics
- Mean diameter: 3.913±0.301 km
- Geometric albedo: 0.073±0.021
- Absolute magnitude (H): 15.5

145523 Lulin (provisional designation 2006 EM_{67}) is a background asteroid from the central region of the asteroid belt, approximately 3.9 kilometers (2.4 miles) in diameter. It was discovered on 7 March 2006, by Taiwanese astronomers Hung-Chin Lin (林宏欽) and Ye Quanzhi (葉泉志) at Lulin Observatory in central Taiwan. It was named for the Lulin mountain and the observatory site.

== Orbit and classification ==
Lulin is a non-family asteroid from the main belt's background population. It orbits the Sun in the central asteroid belt at a distance of 2.2–3.2 AU once every 4 years and 7 months (1,664 days; semi-major axis of 2.75 AU). Its orbit has an eccentricity of 0.18 and an inclination of 11° with respect to the ecliptic. The earliest precovery was taken at ESO's La Silla Observatory in March 1992, extending the asteroid's observation arc by 14 years prior to its discovery observation.

== Naming ==
This minor planet was named after the Lulin mountain in central Taiwan, location of the discovering Lulin Observatory at an altitude of 2862 meters. The official naming citation was published by the Minor Planet Center on 2 April 2007 (M.P.C. 59389). At the observatory, Comet Lulin was discovered in 2007.

== Physical characteristics ==
According to the survey carried out by the NEOWISE mission of NASA's Wide-field Infrared Survey Explorer, the asteroid measures 3.9 kilometers in diameter and its surface has a low albedo of 0.073, which is rather typical for a carbonaceous C-type body. As of 2018, no rotational lightcurve of Lulin has been obtained from photometric observations. The body's rotation period, pole and shape remain unknown.
