= 145534 Jhongda =

Main-belt asteroid

Discovery
- Discovered by: T.-C. Yang; Q.-Z. Ye
- Discovery site: Lulin Obs.
- Discovery date: 1 April 2006

Designations
- Named after: National Central University (Taiwanese University)
- Alternative designations: 2006 GJ
- Minor planet category: main-belt · (middle); Merxia

Orbital characteristics
- Epoch 27 April 2019 (JD 2458600.5)
- Uncertainty parameter 0
- Observation arc: 25.91 yr (9,464 d)
- Aphelion: 3.0903 AU
- Perihelion: 2.3208 AU
- Semi-major axis: 2.7055 AU
- Eccentricity: 0.1422
- Orbital period (sidereal): 4.45 yr (1,625 d)
- Mean anomaly: 262.51°
- Mean motion: 0° 13^{m} 17.4^{s} / day
- Inclination: 6.2031°
- Longitude of ascending node: 105.82°
- Argument of perihelion: 189.48°

Physical characteristics
- Mean diameter: 2.1 km (est. at 0.23); 3.54 km (calculated)
- Synodic rotation period: 4.49±0.040 h
- Geometric albedo: 0.057 (assumed); 0.23 (family albedo)
- Spectral type: C (assumed); S (family based)
- Absolute magnitude (H): 15.6

145534 Jhongda, provisional designation 2006 GJ, is an asteroid and member of the stony Merxia family, orbiting in the central region of the asteroid belt, approximately 2–3 kilometers (1–2 miles) in diameter. It was discovered by Taiwanese astronomers Yang Tingzhang and Ye Quanzhi at the Lulin Observatory on 1 April 2006. The likely elongated asteroid has a rotation period of 4.5 hours. It was named for the Taiwanese National Central University.

== Orbit and classification ==
Jhongda is a member of the Merxia family (513), a large family of stony S-type asteroids named after its parent body 808 Merxia. It orbits the Sun in the central main-belt at a distance of 2.3–3.1 AU once every 4 years and 5 months (1,625 days; semi-major axis of 2.71 AU). Its orbit has an eccentricity of 0.14 and an inclination of 6° with respect to the ecliptic. The first precovery was taken by Spacewatch in February 1992, extending the asteroid's observation arc by 14 years prior to its discovery at the Lulin Observatory.

== Naming ==
This minor planet was named after the Taiwanese National Central University, which controls the discovering Lulin Observatory. "Jhongda" is the University's abbreviation in Mandarin Chinese. The official naming citation was published by the Minor Planet Center on 2 April 2007 (M.P.C. 59389).

== Physical characteristics ==
In January 2014, a rotational lightcurve of Jhongda was obtained from photometric observation by astronomers at the Intermediate Palomar Transient Factory in California. Lightcurve analysis gave a rotation period of 4.490±0.040 hours with a high brightness variation of 0.67 in magnitude (U=2) indicative of an elongated, non-spherical shape. The Collaborative Asteroid Lightcurve Link assumes a standard albedo for carbonaceous asteroids of 0.057 and calculates a diameter of 3.54 kilometers with an absolute magnitude of 15.98. Conversely, Jhongda measure only 2.1 kilometers for an albedo of 0.23, which is typical for the stony members of the Merxia family.
