= Public transport in Pezinok =

Bus-based public transport system in Pezinok, Slovakia

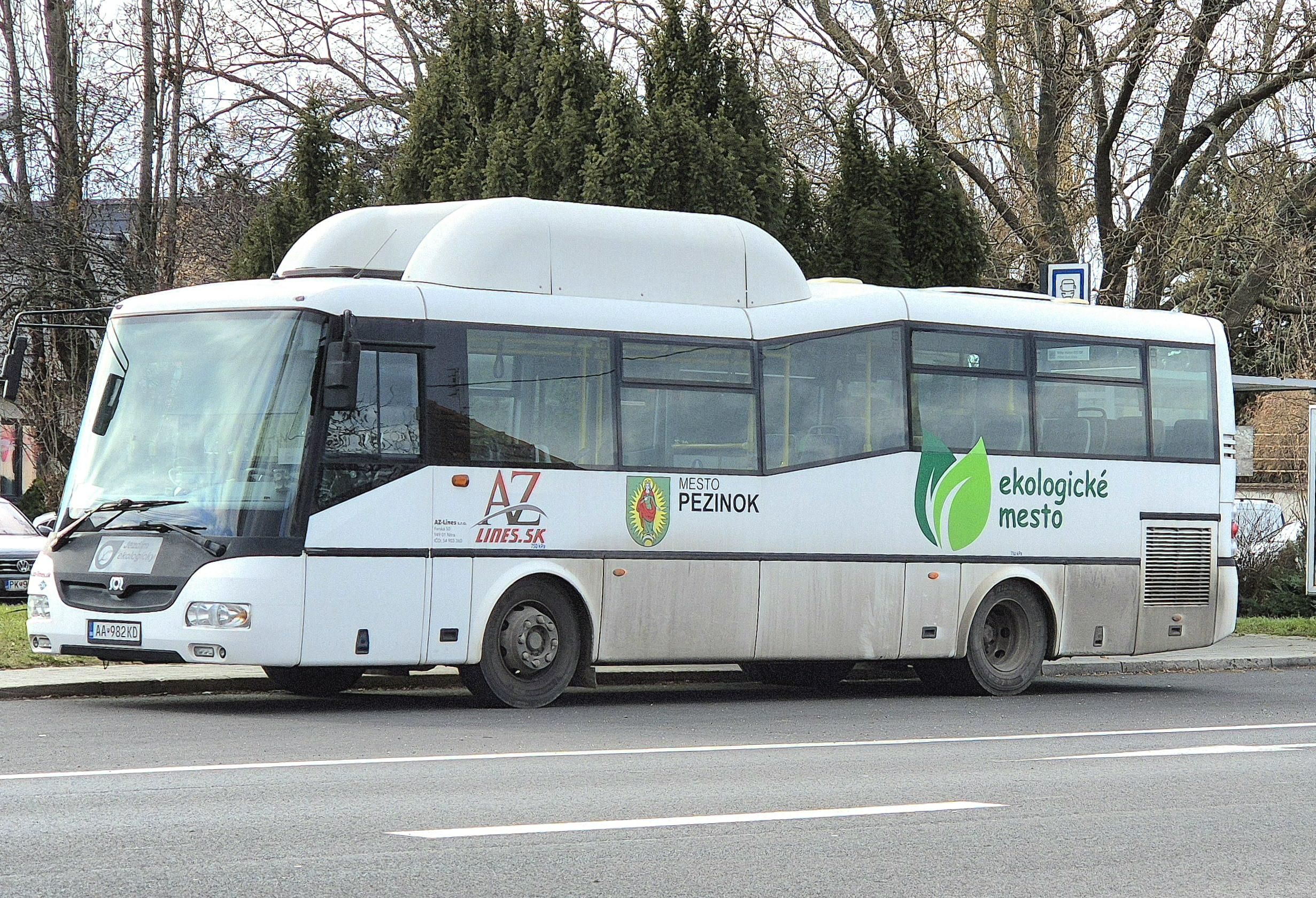
MAD Pezinok bus parked at the Jesenského bus stop in January 2025

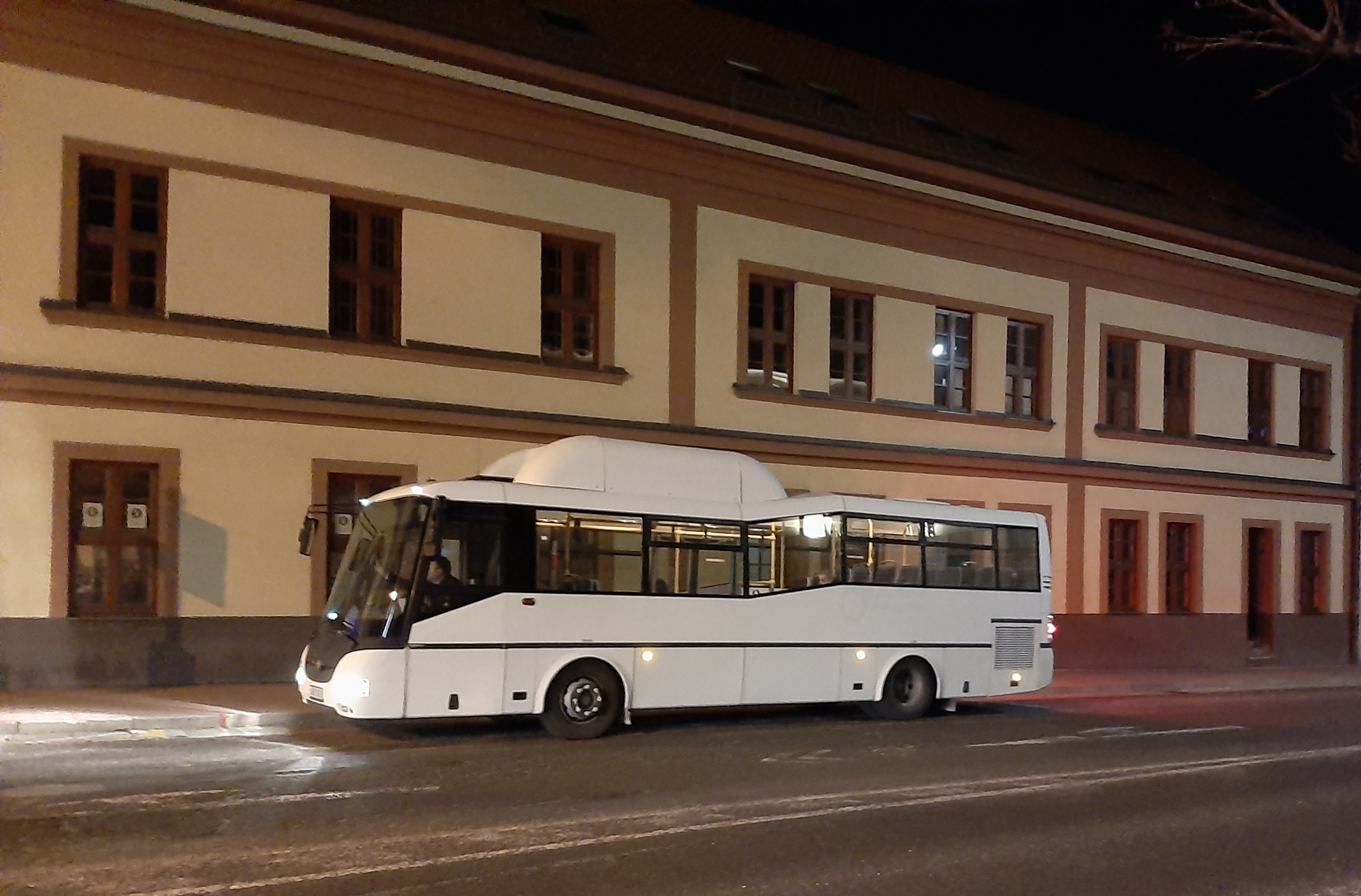
Line 1 bus on platform A of the Radničné námestie bus stop on Holubyho Street in January 2024

Public transport in Pezinok (Slovak: Mestská hromadná doprava v Pezinku) or Town bus transport in Pezinok (Slovak: Autobusová mestská doprava v Pezinku or Mestská autobusová doprava v Pezinku; shortly MHD Pezinok or MAD Pezinok) is a network of urban public transport lines in Pezinok. Public transport services are provided by only one carrier, from 8 January 2024 by AZ–Lines.

Public transport serves not only to ensure the transport of residents to work, schools and the hospital, but also for walking around the city. From January 2024, in addition to the working week, it also operates on weekends and holidays. It serves a total of 24 bus stops.

== History ==
The original public transport in Pezinok ran until 11 December 2005, when it was unexpectedly cancelled and was subsequently replaced by regional buses of the SAD Bratislava carrier. After the cancellation, the stops Tatra Regena, Drevoindustria, Sklad, OSP, Komenského ulica, 1. mája, Bernolákova, Zigmundíkova, Malokarpatská a Kúpalisko were cancelled. Also the stops Šenkvická, Cajlanská, sídlisko Sever, Cajlanská stred a Muškát, which were later restored for the Slovak Lines regional line no. 522.

Until 14 November 2021, transport to Pezinok was provided by regional line no. 522. After the change of the regional carrier in the Bratislava Self-Governing Region, the city ordered the services of the Slovak Lines Express, a. s. carrier

Until January 2024, public transport operated only on weekday peak hours at approximately 5:10 a.m. – 9:00 a.m. and 1:00 p.m. – 6:45 p.m. It was served only by line 5 connecting the railway station, Sídlisko Sever, Cajla and the Philippe Pinel Psychiatric Hospital.

== Lines (as of 1 February 2026) ==
In April 2023, Pezinok began preparations for a new urban public transport model that it wanted to launch on 1 January 2024, including expanding the number of lines to four. In early June 2023, the city announced a second round of preparatory market consultations, modifying some requirements. The proposed routes of some lines were modified and the expected annual volume of services was reduced to 112 000 km. The lines should have been marked with the numbers 522, 523 and 524 within the IDS BK.

On 21 December 2023, information on the launch of three new lines and the creation of new stops, totaling 24, was officially published. The new carrier had to start serving the original line early in the first week of January 2024, because the original carrier's contract expired. Three new stops – "Kutuzovova", "Panský chodník-Dona Sandtnera" and "Okružná LIDL" – have been added since January 2025. Line routes between "Nemocnica" and "Železničná stanica", lines to Sídlisko Muškát and lines to Kučišdorf are adjusted and runs 16 times a day. Circular line through "Majakovského" and "Sídlisko Juh" is divided into a small (current) and a large circuit (through the new "Okružná LIDL" bus stop). Since 1 February 2026, new lines number 5 and 55 will operate the route between "Železničná stanica" and "Grinava, Štúrova".

List of MAD Pezinok lines:

A Line no. 1: Železničná stanica (Railway Station) – Radničné námestie (Town Hall Square) – Trhovisko (Marketplace) – ZŠ Kupeckého (Kupeckého Primary School) – Suvorovova – Sídlisko Sever – L. Novomeského – Dr. Bokesa – Cintorín Cajla (Cajla Cemetery) – Zumberg – Nemocnica (Hospital) (original line)

A Line no. 11: Nemocnica (Hospital) – Zumberg – Cintorín Cajla (Cajla Cemetery) – Dr. Bokesa – L. Novomeského – Sídlisko Sever – Suvorovova – ZŠ Kupeckého (Kupeckého Primary School) – Trhovisko (Marketplace) – Radničné námestie (Town Hall Square) – Železničná stanica (Railway Station) (original line)

B Line no. 2: Železničná stanica (Railway Station) – Radničné námestie (Town Hall Square) – Trnavská – Šenkvická – Sídlisko Muškát – Gen. Pekníka – Amfiteáter (Amphitheater) – L. Novomeského – Dr. Bokesa – Cintorín Cajla (Cajla Cemetery) – Zumberg – Nemocnica (Hospital)

B Line no. 22: Nemocnica (Hospital) – Zumberg – Cintorín Cajla (Cajla Cemetery) – Dr. Bokesa – L. Novomeského – Amfiteáter (Amphitheater) – Gen. Pekníka – Sídlisko Muškát – Šenkvická – Trnavská – Radničné námestie (Town Hall Square) – Železničná stanica (Railway Station)

C Line no. 3: Železničná stanica (Railway Station) – Radničné námestie (Town Hall Square) – Trhovisko (Marketplace) – ZŠ Kupeckého (Kupeckého Primary School) – Suvorovova – Sídlisko Sever – Panský chodník, Žarnovických – Kutuzovova – Nemocnica (Hospital) – Pod priehradou (Under the Dam) – Kučišdorfská dolina (Kučišdorf Valley)

C Line no. 33: Kučišdorfská dolina (Kučišdorf Valley) – Pod priehradou (Under the Dam) – Nemocnica (Hospital) – Kutuzovova – Panský chodník, Žarnovických – Sídlisko Sever – Suvorovova – ZŠ Kupeckého (Kupeckého Primary School) – Trhovisko (Marketplace) – Radničné námestie (Town Hall Square) – Železničná stanica (Railway Station)

D Line no. 4: Železničná stanica (Railway Station) – Radničné námestie (Town Hall Square) – Trhovisko (Marketplace) – ZŠ Kupeckého (Kupeckého Primary School) – Suvorovova – Sídlisko Sever – Suvorovova – ZŠ Kupeckého – Majakovského – Komenského – Komenského ZOS – Fándlyho – Jesenského – Železničná stanica (Railway Station)

D Line no. 44: Železničná stanica (Railway Station) – Radničné námestie (Town Hall Square) – Trhovisko (Marketplace) – ZŠ Kupeckého (Kupeckého Primary School) – Suvorovova – Sídlisko Sever – Suvorovova – ZŠ Kupeckého – Majakovského – Okružná LIDL – Sídlisko Juh – Fándlyho – Jesenského – Železničná stanica (Railway Station)

E Line no. 5: Železničná stanica (Railway Station) – Jesenského – Fándlyho – Sídlisko Juh – Kaufland – Grinava, Myslenická – Grinava, Štúrova

E Line no. 55: Grinava, Štúrova – Grinava, Myslenická – Kaufland – Sídlisko Juh – Fándlyho – Jesenského – Železničná stanica (Railway Station)

== Vehicles ==
Until December 2005, in public transport in Pezinok were used Karosa C 734 buses and since the 12 December 2021 reintroduction, the Irisbus Crossway LE 12M buses were used. Since 8 January 2024, three CNG Iveco SOR IBNG 9.5 buses have been in operation. The town also has a backup bus powered by diesel fuel and in the transitional period at the end of February 2024, the Pezinok public transport system also helped to start up the Karosa C 935 Récréo bus. As of 1 January 2025, the carrier still had three Iveco SOR BNG 9.5 CNG buses in operation and also one Irisbus Citelis 12M bus. Along with them, Isuzu NovoCiti Life and Isuzu Citiport buses began operating in the first half of 2025. From March 2026, a new electric bus Isuzu NovoCity Volt has been joined with a design referring to the history of town - with portraits of Jozef Ľudovít Holuby, Ľudovít Rajter, Richard Réti, Eugen Suchoň, and Ján Kupecký.

== Fare ==
Traveling by public transport in Pezinok was gratis until the end of February 2024. From March 2024, the fare is €0.50 and an all-day ticket costed €1. Only children under 6 and pensioners traveled for free. The student fare, after showing a student or ISIC card, was €0.30. From 1 January 2025, the fare is gratis again.
