= Catholic Church in Grinava =

Coordinates: 48°16′12″N 17°14′47″E

Catholic church of St Sigismund in Grinava
- Katolícky kostol svätého Žigmunda v Grinave
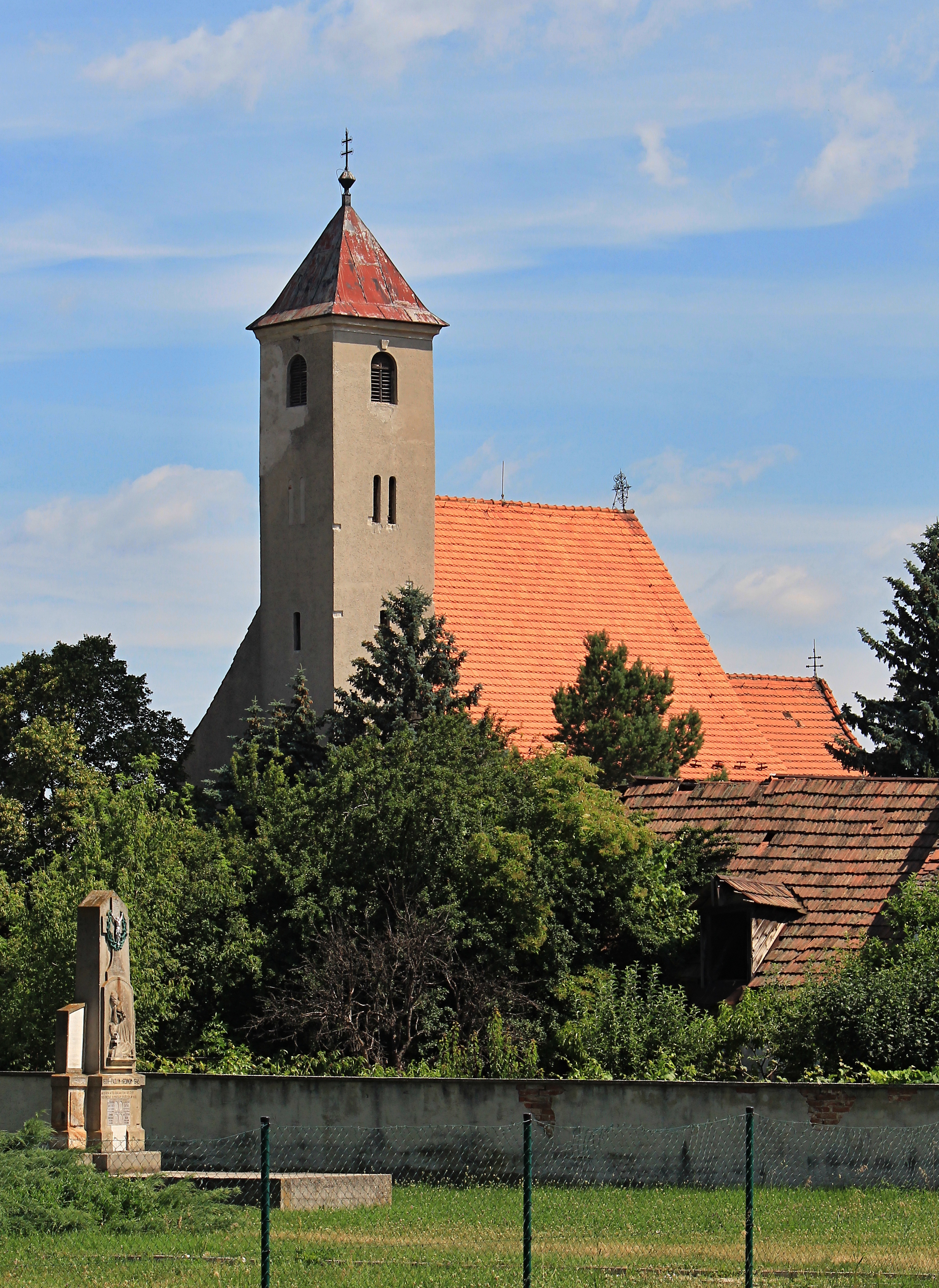
- Catholic church of St Sigismund in Grinava
- Country: Slovakia
- Denomination: Roman Catholic

Architecture
- Architectural type: Gothic–Romanesque
- Years built: 14th century

The Catholic church of St Sigismund in Grinava (Slovak: Katolícky kostol svätého Žigmunda v Grinave) is a 14th-century listed building as well as a Roman Catholic parish church in Grinava, Pezinok, Slovakia.

== Architecture ==
The sanctuary and nave were built by German colonists in the early 14th century in a Gothic style, to replace a Romanesque church that had stood on the site. The location was fortified with a stone wall, part of which still stands. A side aisle was added at the end of 14th century.

There are three altars. The current main altar, dedicated to St Sigismund of Burgundy, was built by Jozef Seilnacht in a neo-Gothic style in 1910.

== History ==
During the Reformation and Counter-Reformation the church changed hands several times, being Protestant from 1611 to 1617 and again from 1645 to 1673. The present church tower was erected while the building was in use as a Lutheran church.

Towards the end of the Second World War the tower, in use by German snipers, was damaged by Russian shells.
