= Pezinok–Rozálka airport =

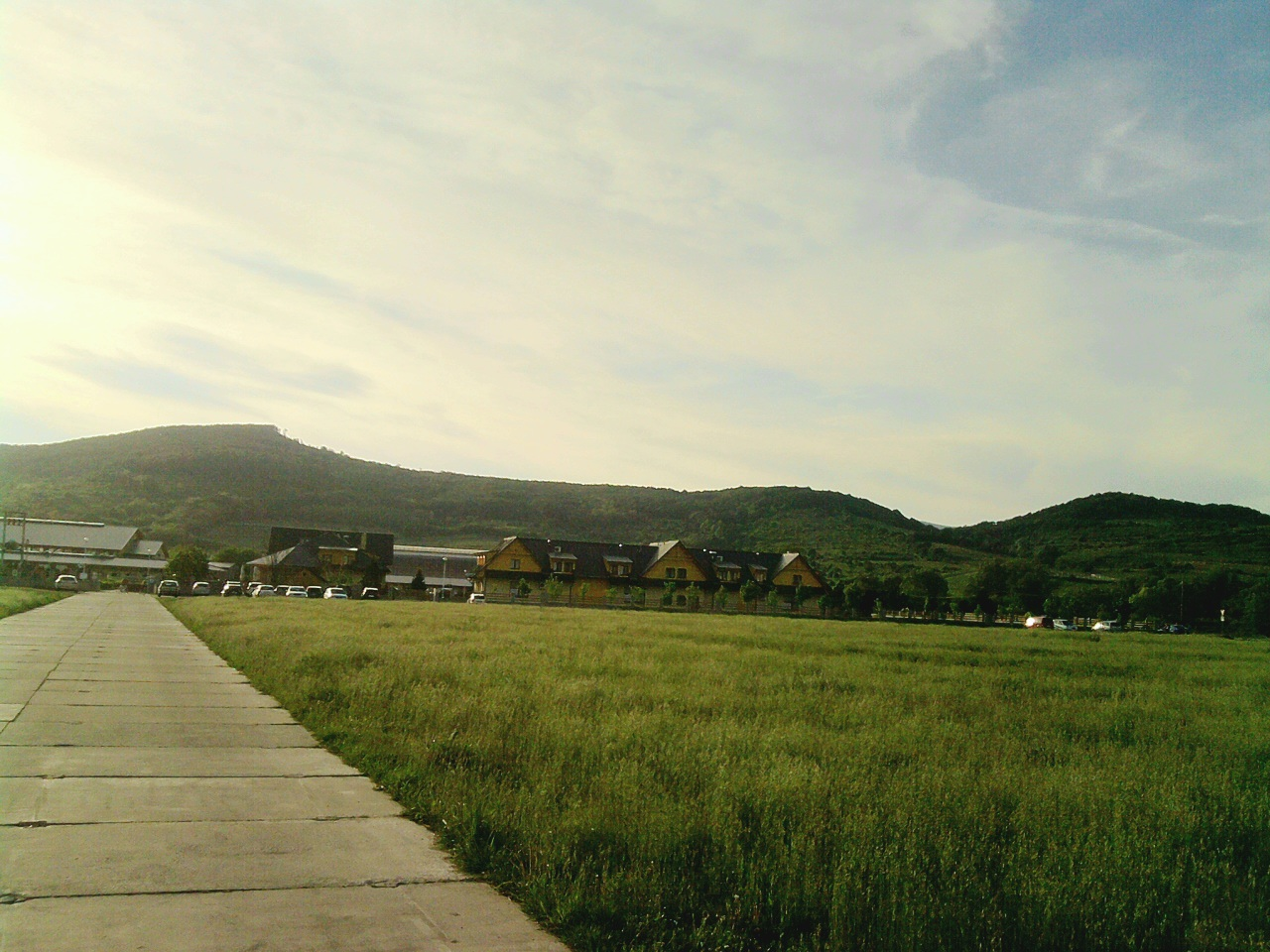
The place where the Pezinok–Rozálka airport was located in the past (2014)

Pezinok–Rozálka airport (Slovak: Letisko Pezinok-Rozálka) was an airfield in the Rozálka locality near the village Cajla and the town of Pezinok. It was in operation from 1919 until the second half of the 20th century. It was located on a grassy meadow (including the site of the current Areál zdravia Rozálka) between the current Secondary Vocational School of the Police Force and the former military barracks.

== Interwar period ==
On 4 May 1919 the 1st Field Air Company was transferred here from Uherské Hradiště. Until 17 May 1919, its captain was Stanislav Novák. Novák was replaced by captain Hugo Betka, who had 4 officers and 118 members of the crew. Until June 1919, the group only conducted reconnaissance and occasional bombing flights. It did not intervene against Hungarian bombers until June 1919. The 1st Field Air Company operated in Pezinok until 22 July 1919, when it was transferred to the airfield in Nitra. The unit as such ceased to exist in the autumn of 1919, when it was dissolved.

=== Airplanes ===
- 2 airplanes Hansa-Brandenburg C.I
- Anatra DS Anasal
- LVG C.V

== Post-war period ==
Later, this military airport became an airfield used by members of the Pezinok Aeroclub. Its most famous members included Ján and Milan Holickí, Ján Pastucha, Valo Mĺkvy, Eduard Brázdovič and Jozef Brunovský. The Pezinok Aeroclub operated until the early 1970s, when it merged with other organizations to form Zväzarm.

=== Equipment at the time of greatest "glory" ===
- 15 airplanes (3 gliders a 12 motor airplanes)
