= Pezinok Grape Harvest Festival =

Annual festival in Pezinok, Slovakia

Pezinok Grape Harvest Festival Pezinské vinobranie or Vinobranie Pezinok
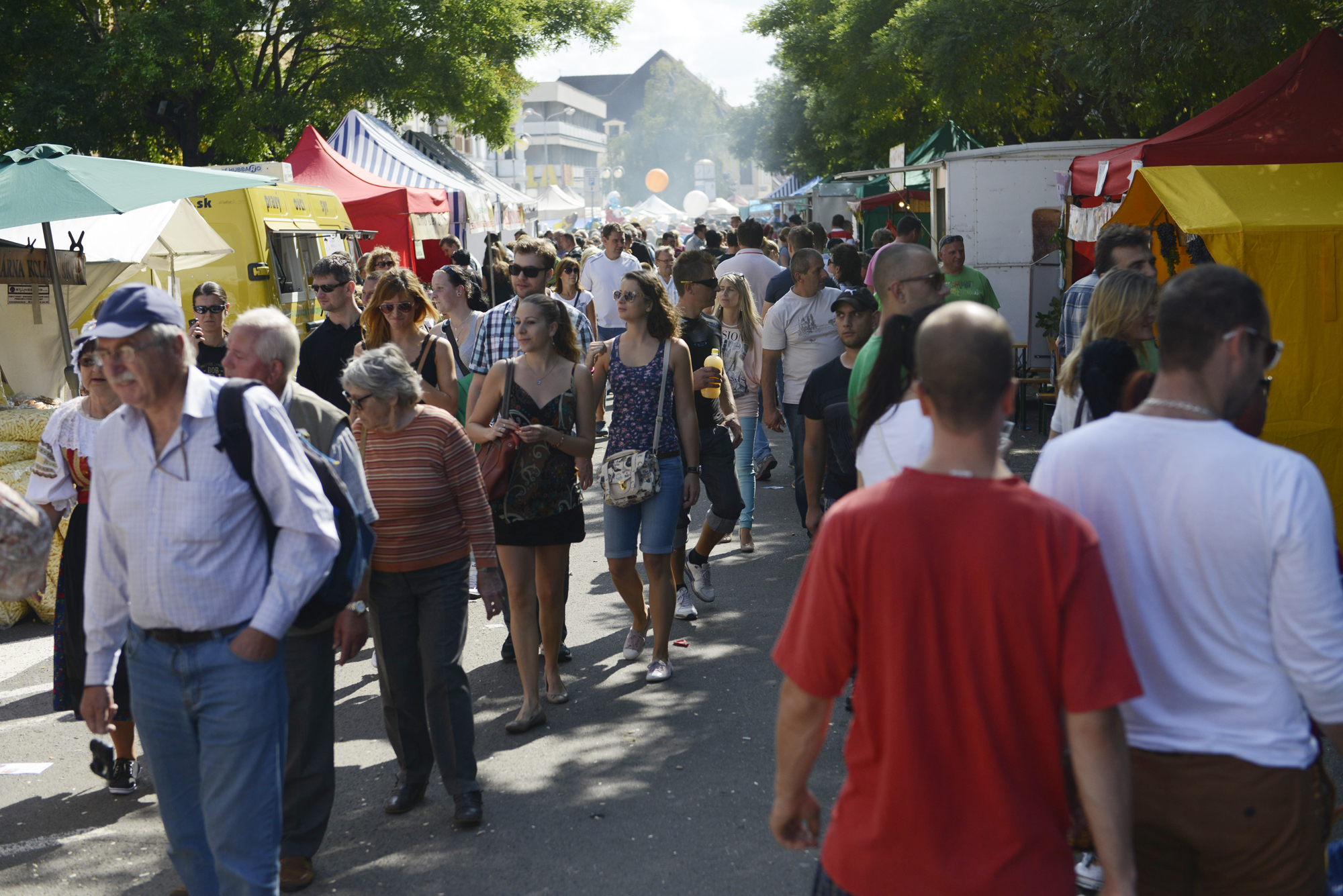
- Festival food stands and visitors in 2014
- Status: active
- Genre: festival with stand street sales, cultural program and entertainment attractions
- Begins: Friday of the third week in September
- Ends: Sunday of the third week in September
- Frequency: annually
- Venue: Town center of Pezinok
- Country: Slovakia
- Years active: 13th century (first mentioned); 19th/20th century (celebrated only in "viechas"); 1934 – 1938/1939 (reorganized); 1958–2003 (alternated with Modra); 2004–2019; 2022–present
- Most recent: 20–22 September 2024
- Next event: TBA 2025
- Website: vinobraniepezinok.sk

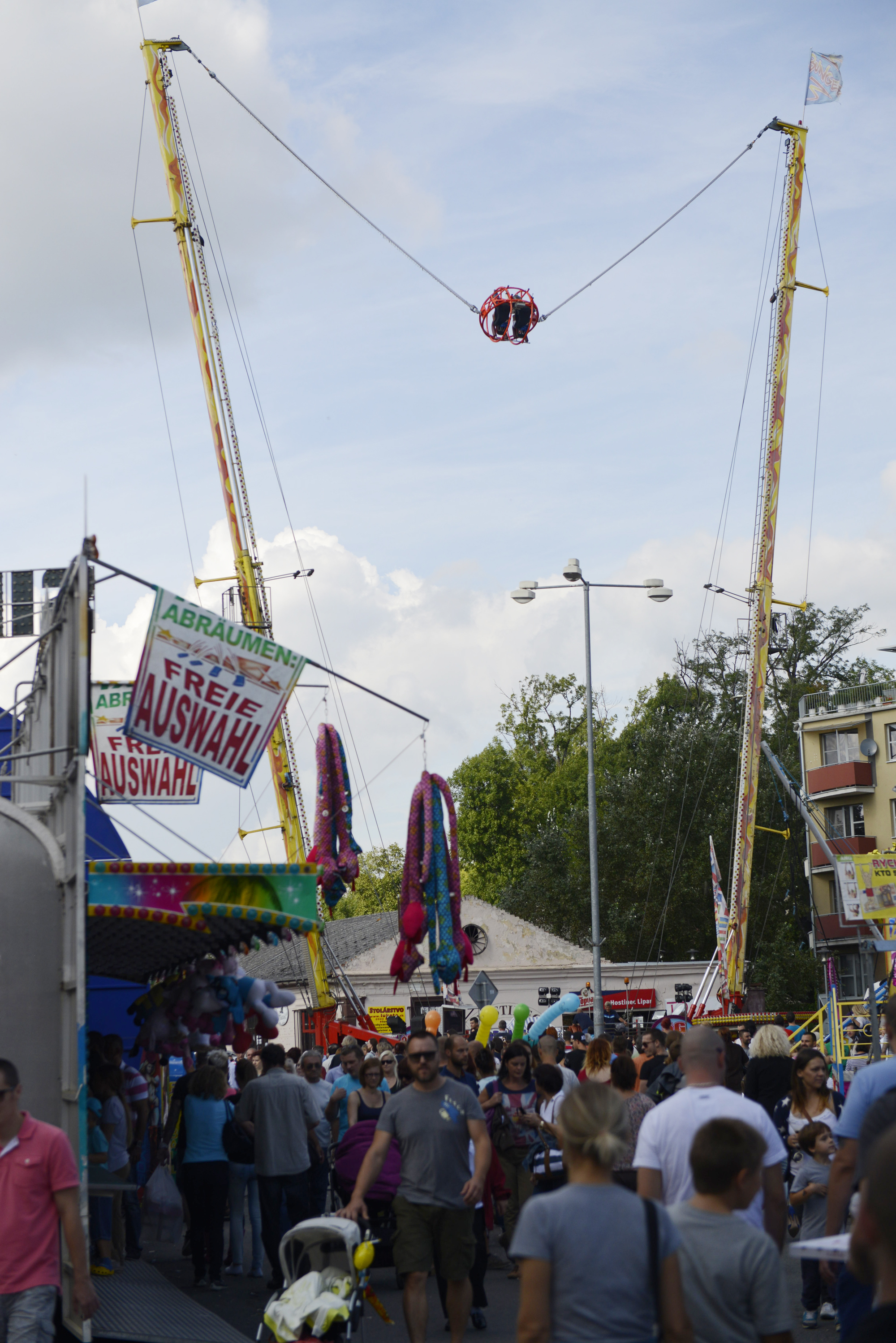
Festival carousels in 2014

The Pezinok Grape Harvest Festival or Pezinok Wine Festival (Slovak: Pezinské vinobranie or Vinobranie Pezinok) is an annual festival in Pezinok, Slovakia which takes place in the town center streets and always on the third long weekend of September, from Friday to Sunday.

== History ==
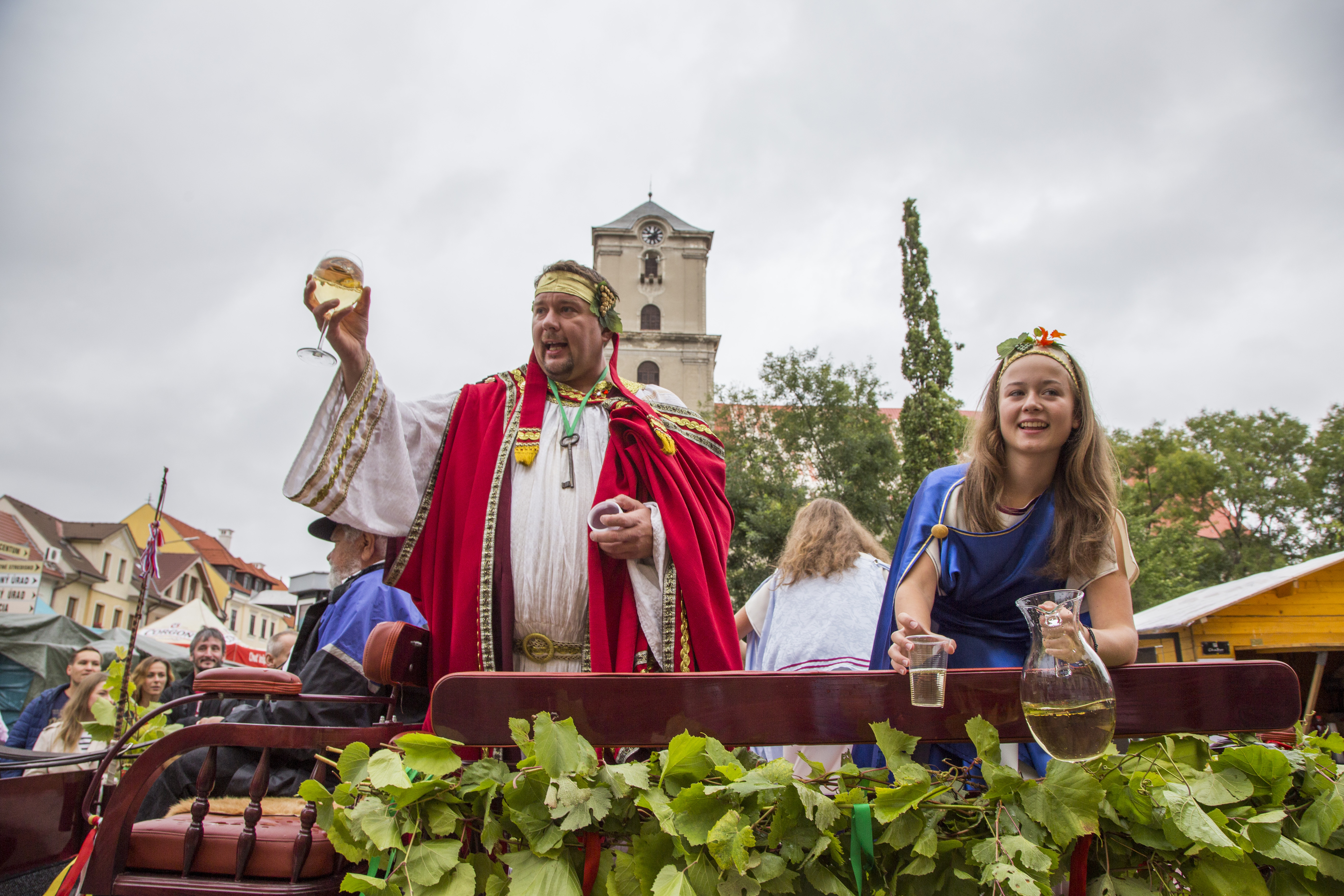
Bakchus, the god of wine, on a chariot during an allegorical procession in 2017

The first mentions about Pezinok harvest festivities come from the 13th century. During the economic recession at the turn of the 19th and 20th century, the harvest beginnings were celebrated only in "viechas" – wine bars selling its own wine. In 1934, the city council decided to restore Pezinok grape harvest festivals. Just before Second World War, this tradition was interrupted and it was not until 1958 that the new Little Carpathians grape harvest festivals began to be organized. Until 2004, towns Pezinok and Modra alternated in securing them. Since that year, they have been organized in Pezinok every year.
