= Za hradbami =

Za hradbami Sídlisko Za hradbami Sídlisko Stred II. (1970s/1980s)
- Neighborhood/Street
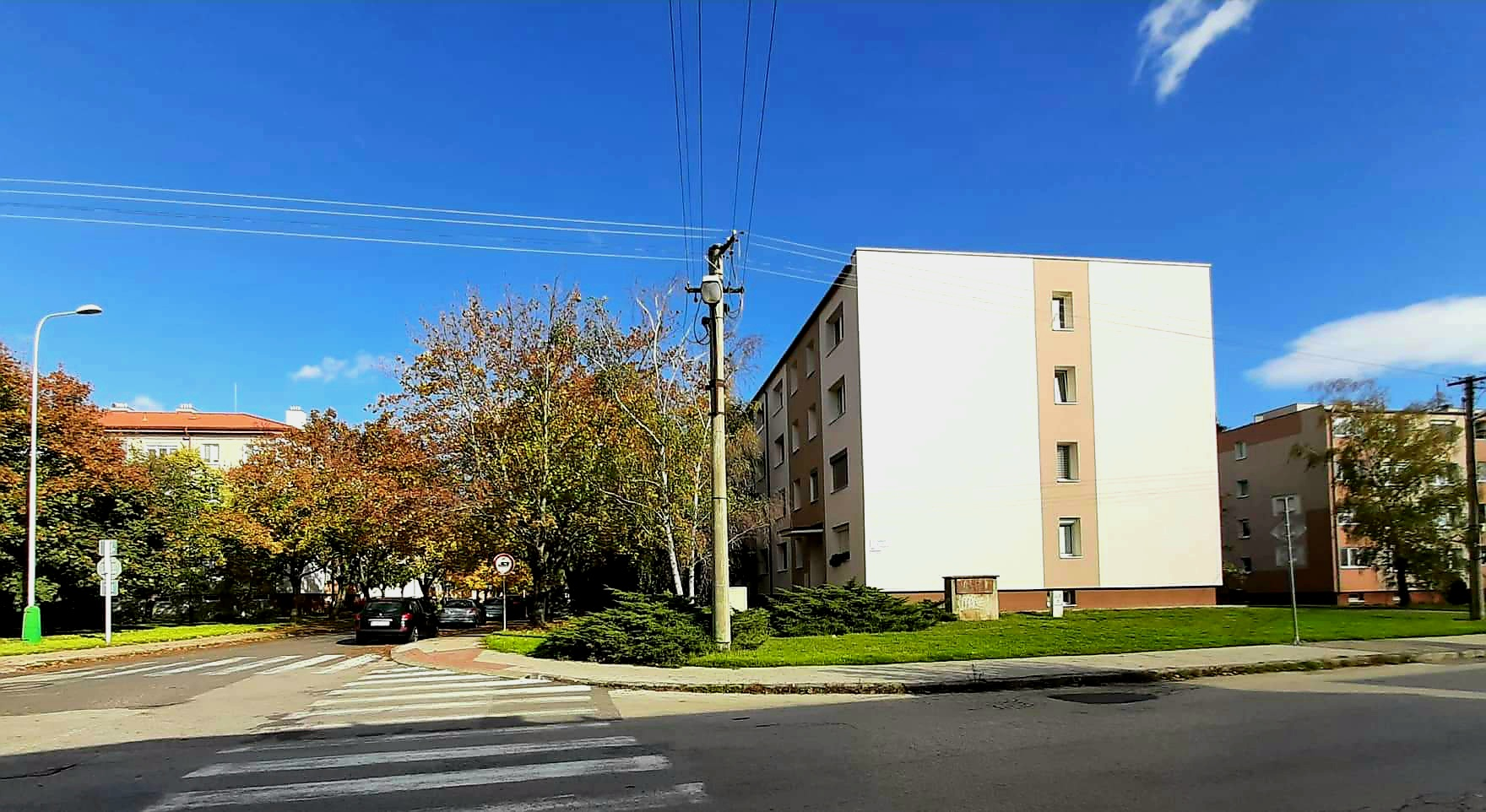
- Za hradbami from the south-west in 2022

- Location of Za hradbami, Pezinok in Slovakia
- Coordinates: 48.286862°N 17.265103°E
- Country: Slovakia
- Region: Bratislava
- District: Pezinok
- Town: Pezinok
- Construction: 1971–1973
- Postal code: 902 01
- Car plate: PK

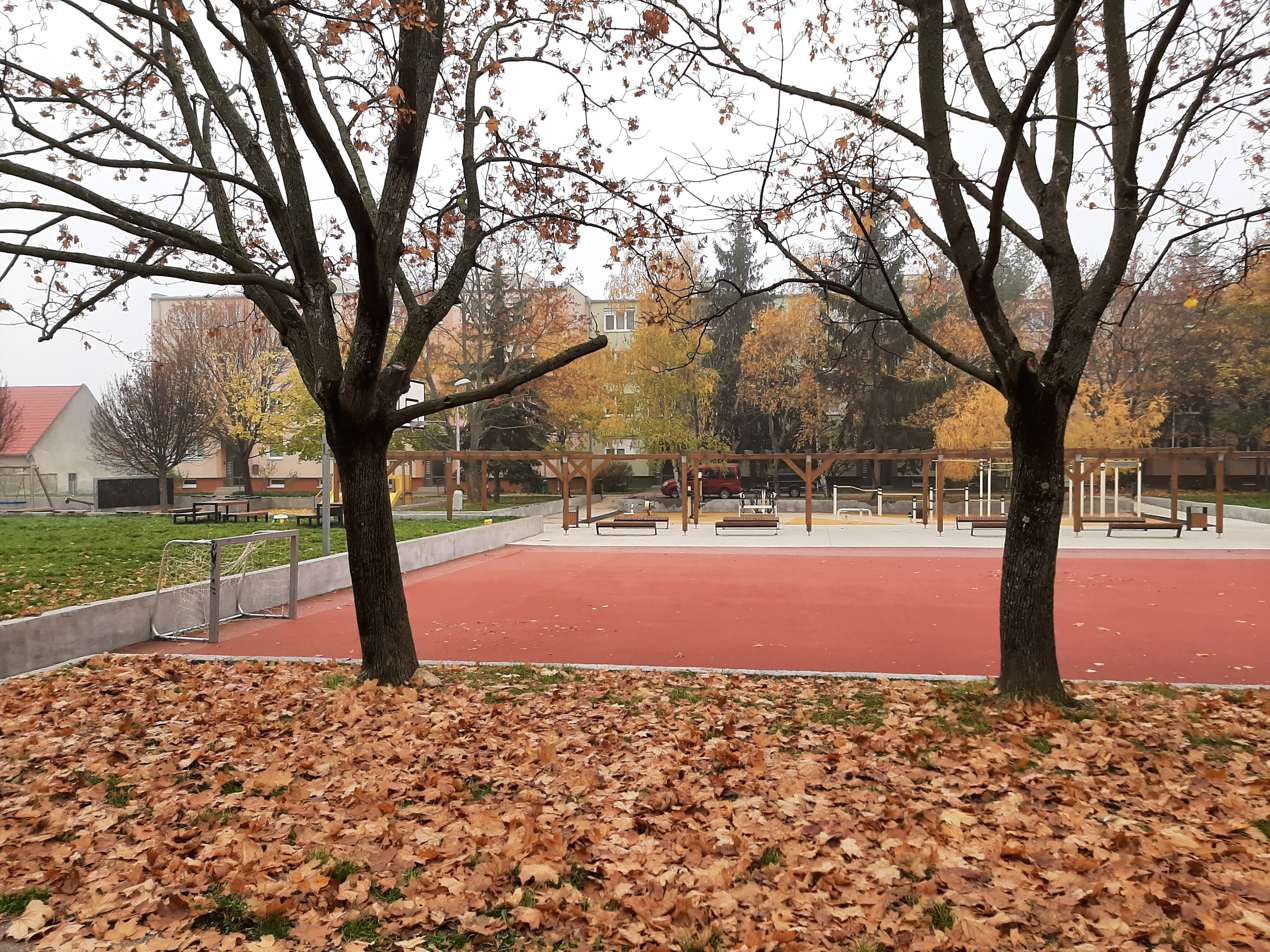
Aktívny park Za hradbami in 2024

Za hradbami (literally "Behind the Walls") is a street and sídlisko near the town centre in Pezinok, Slovakia.

It is named after its location "behind the walls" (Slovak: za hradbami), that is behind the defensive wall. In the past, Za hradbami along with Sídlisko 1. mája were known as Sídlisko Stred II.

In 2021, a playground with a former ball hockey field in Aktívny park Za hradbami was renovated.

Since 1 September 1976, there is a kindergarten at number 1.
