= Oliver Solga =

Slovak politician and art historian (born 1954)

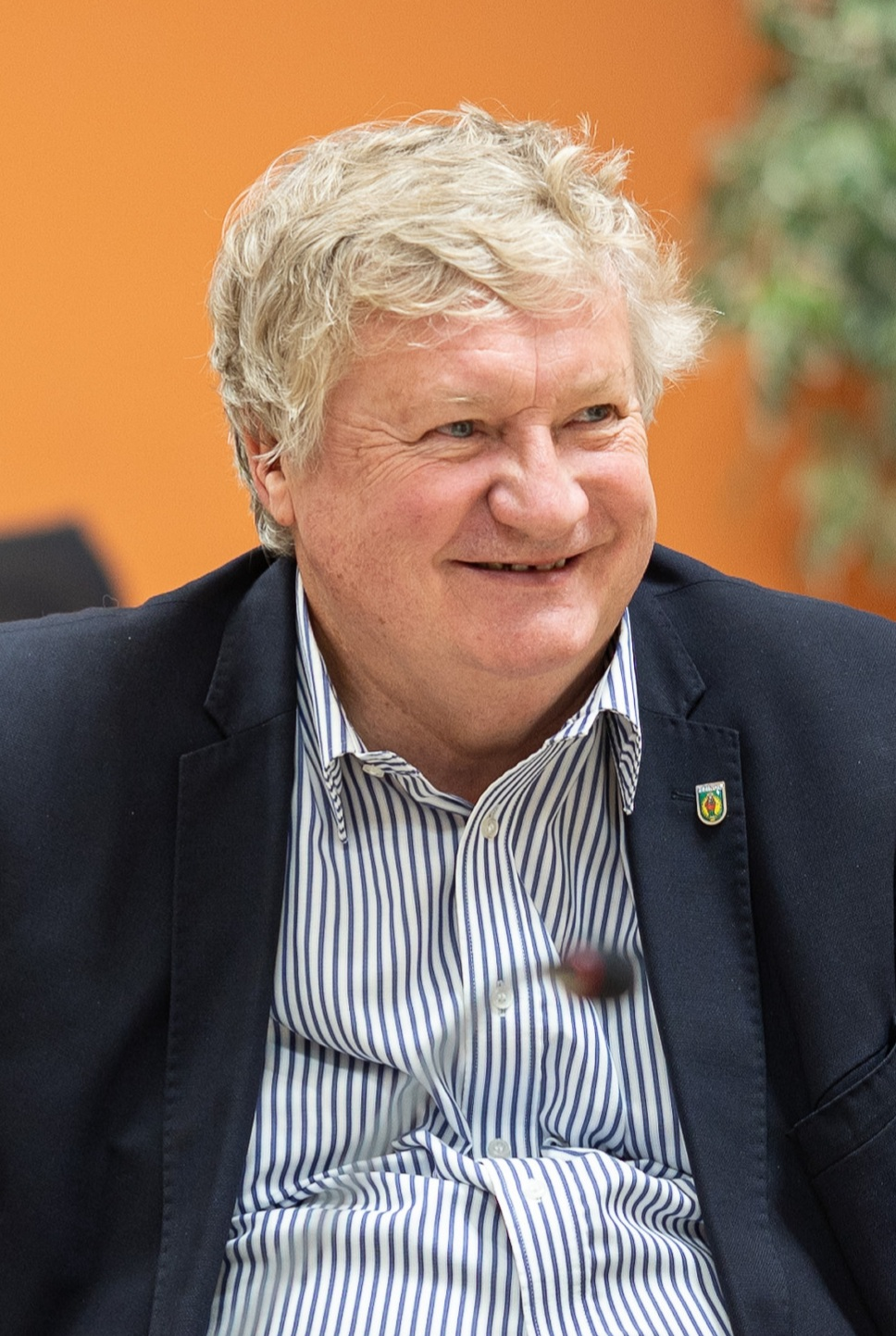
- Oliver Solga in 2024

Current municipal councillor of Pezinok
- Incumbent
- Assumed office 1998–2002; 28 November 2022 – present

Current regional councillor of Bratislava Region
- Incumbent
- Assumed office 2005–? 22 November 2022 – present

Former mayor of Pezinok
- In office December 2002 – 10 December 2018
- Preceded by: Ivan Pessel
- Succeeded by: Igor Hianik

Personal details
- Born: 3 August 1954 (age 72) Modra, Czechoslovakia
- Spouse: Jana Solgová
- Children: Adam Solga
- Education: Faculty of Arts, Comenius University

Oliver Solga (born 3 August 1954) is a Slovak art historian, visual artist and local politician. He was the mayor of Pezinok from 2002 to 2018.

In 1985, he graduated from visual arts at the Faculty of Arts, Comenius University in Bratislava. He worked as a teacher and as editor-in-chief of the monthly magazine called Pezinčan. He was involved in graphics, illustration and postage stamps. He illustrated posters for both years of Koncert mladosti festival. He had several dozen exhibitions at home and abroad, including in Vienna, Warsaw, Budapest, and Paris. As an art historian and curator he prepared several dozen exhibitions of domestic and foreign artists.

He was not and is not a member of any political party. He is married, has a son, Adam, and grandchildren, Terézia and Oliver.

== Career ==
- 1985–1995 – teacher at the Secondary Vocational School in Pezinok (ceramics department)
- 1995–1998 – editor-in-chief of the Pezinčan magazine

=== Communal politics ===
- 1998–2002–municipal councillor and deputy mayor of Pezinok
- 2002–elected mayor of Pezinok
- 2006–elected mayor of Pezinok
- 2010–elected mayor of Pezinok
- 2014–elected mayor of Pezinok
- 2022–elected municipal councillor of Pezinok

=== Regional politics ===
- 2005–elected regional councillor of Bratislava Region
- 2022–elected regional councillor of Bratislava Region
