= Makówki =

Central European dessert

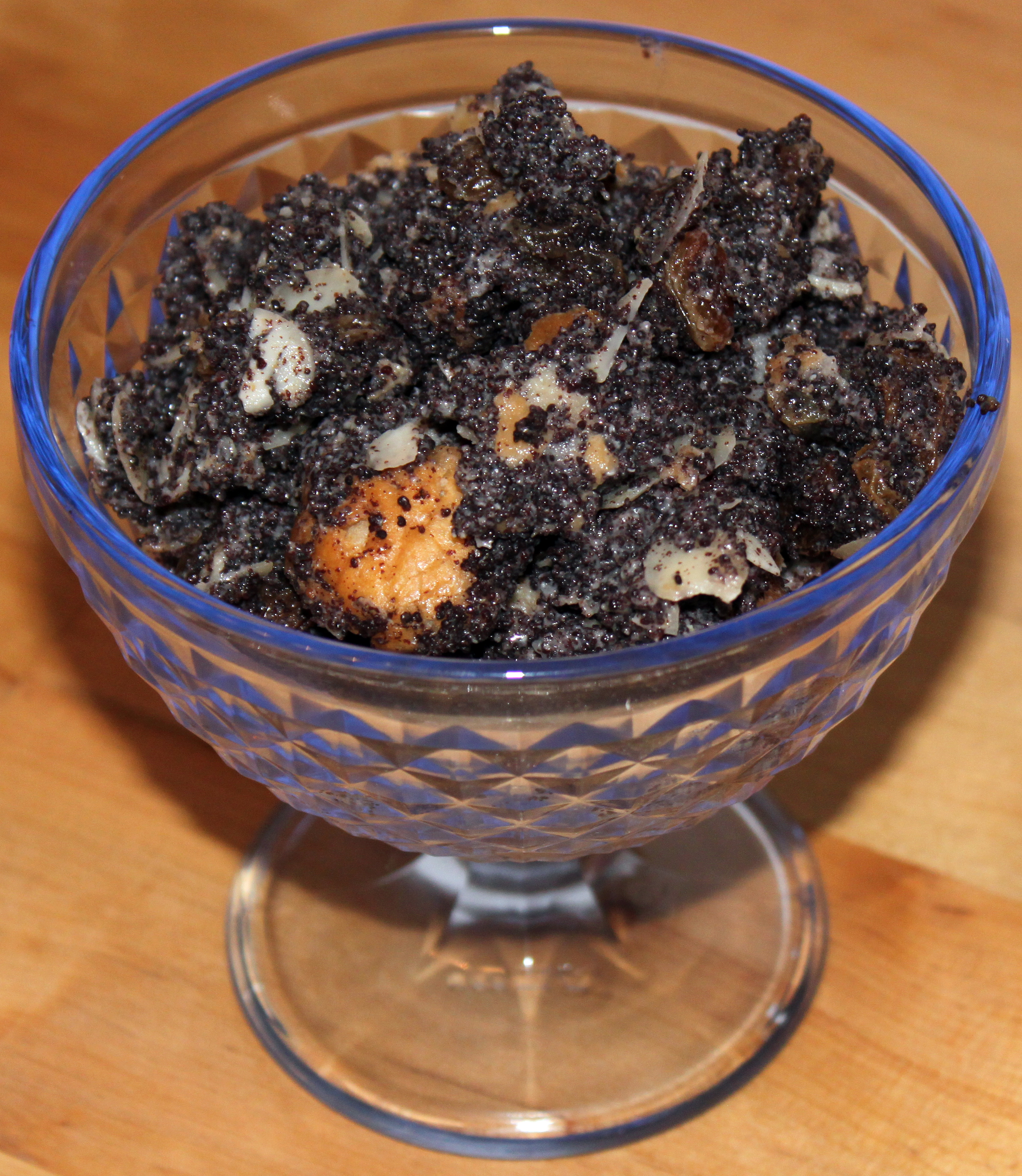
- Alternative names: Makůwki, mohnpielen, mákos guba
- Type: Sweetened yeast bread
- Region or state: Central Europe; Poland, Germany, Hungary and Silesia
- Main ingredients: Flour, yeast, butter, milk, salt, sugar, honey, poppy seeds
- Variations: Dried fruit (such as the figs, raisins, apricots, dates), cinnamon, rum, nuts

Makówki (Silesian: Makůwki / Makōwki, Lower Silesian: Mohn Kließla, German: Mohnpielen, Hungarian: Mákos guba) is a sweet poppy seed-based bread dessert from Central Europe. The dish is considered traditional in Silesia (southwestern Poland), where it is served almost exclusively on Christmas Eve. It is also popular in other parts of Poland as well as in eastern Germany, Slovakia and in Hungary.

== Outside Silesia ==
Makówki are also well known in Brandenburg and Berlin under the name Mohnpielen. Theodor Fontane in his travels through the Margraviate of Brandenburg wrote about Mohnpielen and other dishes.

A similar dish made with slices of Kifli (Kipferl) in Hungary is called mákos guba.

Version of this dish called Opekance (bobáľky) is known in Slovakia, it is prepared during Christmas time as fasting food. Opekance are prepared with poppy seeds or ground nuts.

In Poland, outside of the Silesia region, the dish is widely known as makiełki. This is particularly common in Poznań and in Łódź (Lodz), where Silesian migrants settled during the Industrial Revolution in the 19th century.

== Preparation ==
The main ingredients are sweet white bread and finely ground poppy seeds boiled in milk with butter. Other important ingredients include dried fruit (figs, raisins, apricots, dates, etc.), almonds and other kinds of nuts (the choice of nuts and dried fruit varies). It is flavoured with sugar, honey, vanilla, cinnamon and rum.

The bread is cut into thin slices and layered in a clay pot or more often a glass or crystal bowl. After each layer, the sauce of the boiled poppy seeds, with flavouring and nuts, is poured so that the bread is well soaked. The top is decorated with some extra nuts and fruit. The dish is served cold, at least several hours after preparation.

== Significance in Hungary ==
It is a common dish in Hungary and in some places a Christmas dish. The name comes from the cross between poppyseed(mák) and guba (milk-boiled, flavoured fried dough. The name is a consequence of the Bouba effect). There are other types of gubas, like gubakifli, a sweet Hungarian baguette.

== Significance in Silesia ==
Silesian cuisine can be very conservative. The tradition of serving makówki/mohnkließla/mohnpielen is well maintained among Silesian peoples and it is difficult to imagine a Silesian Christmas without the dish. By the elders, it would be considered unorthodox to prepare it outside the Christmas—New Year period. Preparing makówki outside Silesia can be difficult due to the unavailability of finely ground poppy seed (a special mill is usually required). In the United States, canned poppy paste is sometimes commercially available and can be used.

== See also ==
- Opekance
- List of desserts
