= Small Carpathian Museum =

Wine museum in Pezinok, Slovakia

Small Carpathian Museum in Pezinok
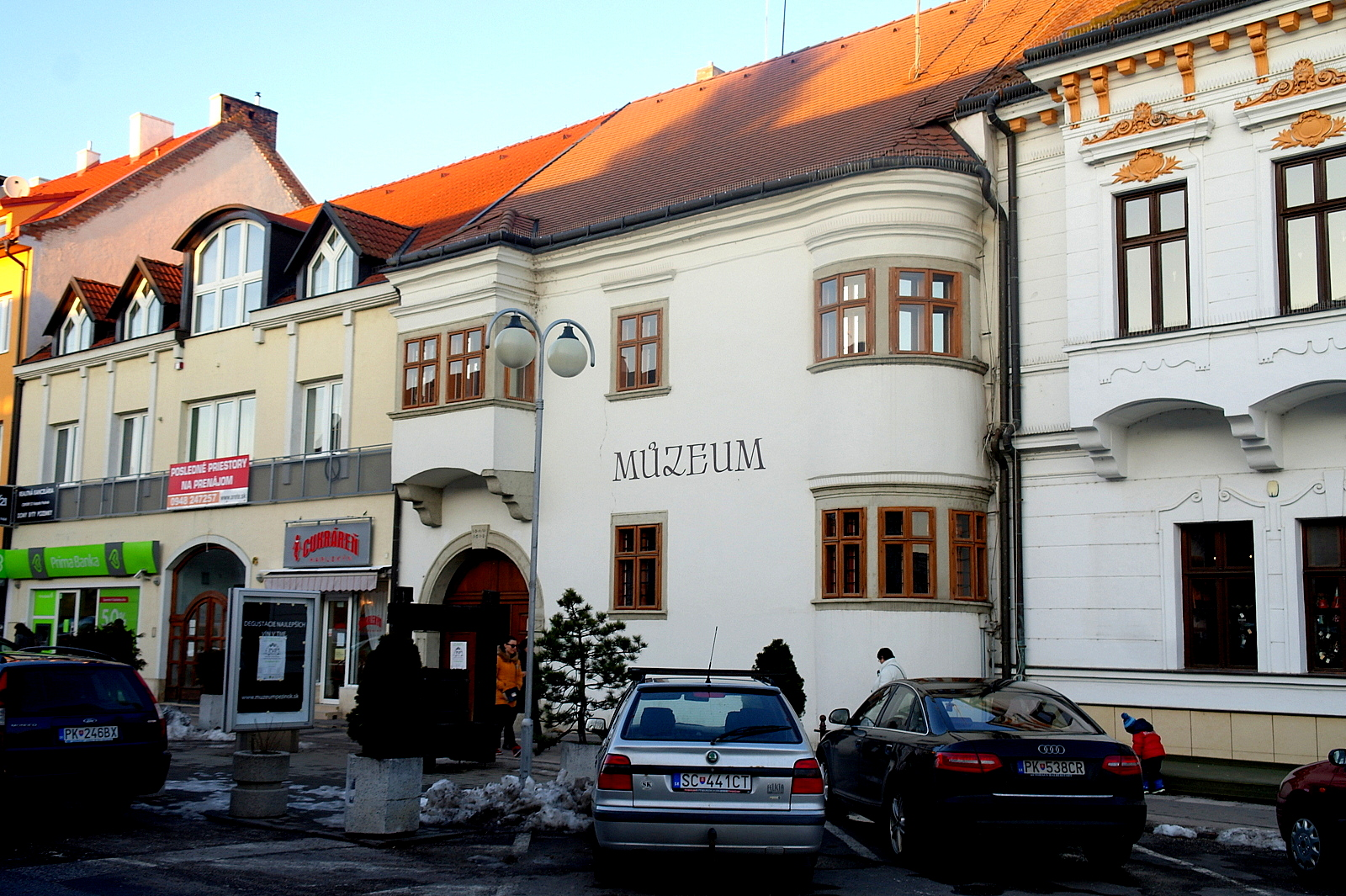
- Building of The Small Carpathian Museum in Pezinok, M.R.Štefánika 4

- Location within Bratislava Region Small Carpathian Museum (Slovakia)

General information
- Type: Museum
- Location: Bratislava region, M. R. Štefánika 4; 902 01 Pezinok, Pezinok, Slovakia
- Coordinates: 48.286983°N 17.270686°E

The Small Carpathian Museum (aka Little Carpathian Museum) in Pezinok, Bratislava, Slovakia, is a local museum with an emphasis on wine making.

== Overview ==
The museum was reopened to the public on 18 November 2008 after two years of renovation. By using European Union funds and funds from the founder, the Bratislava self-governing region, the museum’s building has undergone a complete reconstruction. The institution is being shaped as a regional museum with a strong accent on viticulture, grape growing and notably wine from the Small Carpathian viticulture region.

The museum features a tour of the cellar exposition with the biggest collection of viticulture presses in Europe, temporary exhibitions on various topics, workshops for schools and Small Carpathian wine tasting in the unique premises of the museum. It is one of the organisers of the St. Urban event, the Richard Réti Memorial international chess tournament, the Ceramic market and it is one of the stops during the Open Cellar Day on the Small Carpathian Wine Road. Together with the civic association Museum Vinorum, it is an organiser of the Pezinok Wine Cellars. The museum also organises temporary exhibitions abroad (e.g., the Vinohrady, wine and people exhibition presented in September 2005 in the European Parliament in Strasbourg and later in Vienna and Milotice, Czech Republic).

The institution has its own sommelier along with professional employees and technical staff.

== Facilities ==
=== Tour of the cellar exposition ===
The exposition is focused on introducing viticulture and grape growing in the region of the Small Carpathians using multimedia as a modern communication means. After consulting professionals, a friendly application of modern design elements in the ancient cellar premises was used, however only in those cases where it did not interfere with the atmosphere and character of the area.

The tour uses light, sound, tasting, and other interactive activities. There is an aroma bar where it is possible to smell typical local wine. The exposition includes the biggest collection of wine presses in Central Europe. These date from the 17th to the 20th century.

=== Tasting Small Carpathian wines ===
At the end of the exposition tour, there is a tasting of cultivar wines of the Small Carpathian region in the cellar premises.
