= Jozef Seilnacht =

Jozef Seilnacht (1859–1939) was a German altar builder and furniture maker primarily active in what is now Slovakia. He worked in both Gothic Revival and Baroque Revival styles.

== Life ==
Seilnacht was born in Edingen, Germany, on 21 January 1859. He moved to Hlohovec in the 1890s with his wife, Helena Mall, and their three children. After his first wife's death he remarried with Barbara Zimmerman. He worked as a craft teacher in Leopoldov Prison before specialising in building altars. His first altar was commissioned in 1905 by Count Erdődy for the chapel in his mansion in Hlohovec. He also built altars for the Lutheran church in Piešťany and the Catholic church in Grinava, among many others. He died in Hlohovec on 11 February 1939.

In February and March 2020, the Museum of National History in Hlohovec hosted an exhibition of his work.
