= Pezinok railway station =

Slovak railway station

Pezinok
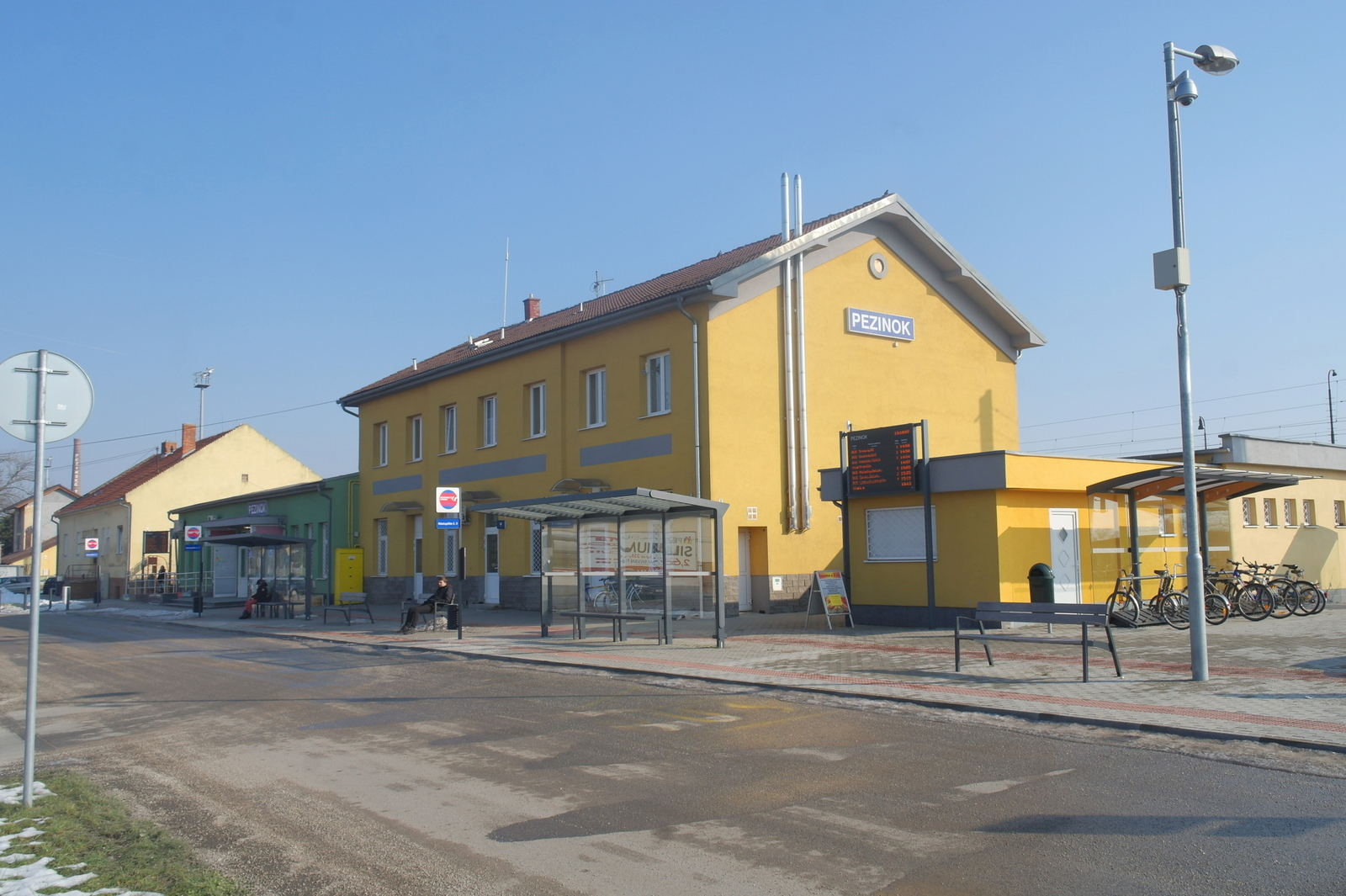
- Building of the railway station and integrated transport terminal in 2015

General information
- Location: Holubyho 2; 902 01 Pezinok; Pezinok; Pezinok; Bratislava Region; Slovakia
- Coordinates: 48.282704°N 17.270223°E
- Owner: Železnice Slovenskej republiky (ŽSR)
- Line: Bratislava – Žilina railway
- Platforms: 2
- Tracks: 3
- Train operators: Železničná spoločnosť Slovensko (ZSSK)
- Connections: local buses

Other services
national, international tickets
Location
- Location within Slovakia

Pezinok railway station (Slovak: Železničná stanica Pezinok) is the main railway station in Pezinok.

Pezinok railway station is located on double-tracked electrified railway line No. 120 Bratislava – Žilina. It is oriented in the north-south direction and it is electrified with traction voltage system 25 kV, 50 Hz. Station belongs to the oldest stations, it was built on the first Slovak railway with animal traction. Horse railway went from Bratislava to Trnava and Sereď, its first section from Bratislava to Svätý Jur was opened on 24 September 1840 and from Svätý Jur to Pezinok on 30 June 1841.

Traffic on the animal railway was stopped on 15 October 1872, due its rebuilding to steam-machine railway. Transport in the steam traction was recovered on 1 May 1873 by Považie railway company (Slovak: Spoločnosť považskej železnice). From that time, the form of the station has changed several times. Last time, it was in the connection with the construction of the V. corridor. Modernization of the station started in 2005 and construction works took two years.

== Railway and transport ==
- Bratislava – Žilina railway (line No. 120)

== Reconstruction ==
Within modernization of the railway line Bratislava – Žilina with support from European Union, Pezinok railway station also changed its face. Reconstructed was not only station building, but also four tracks, they also built extra-level platforms, subway unter the rails, new electrical wiring. Goal of the modernization is upgrade speed to 160 kilometers. The Railway company worked with local youth to have them spray paint the interior of the station subway.

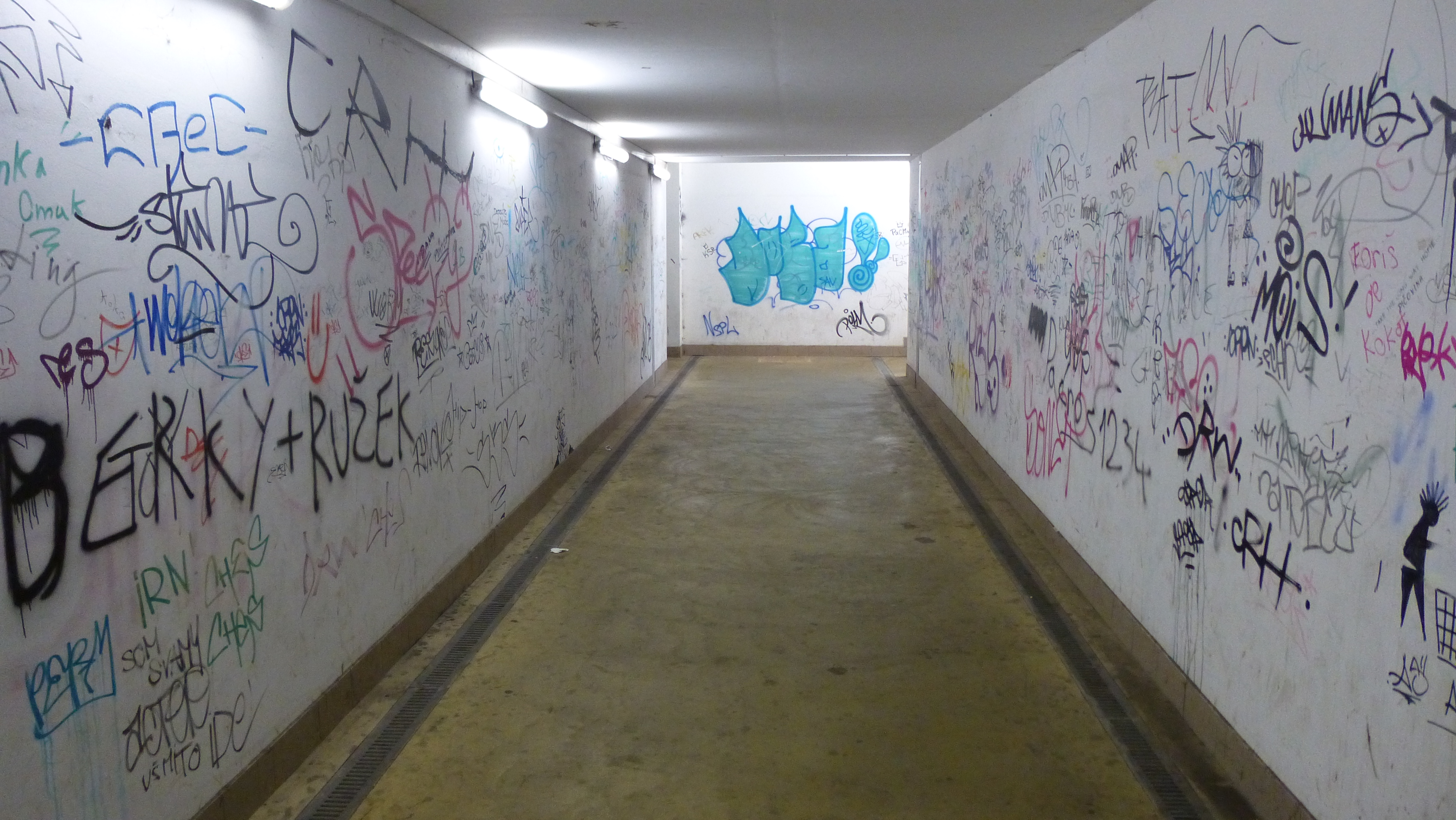
The station subway before its reconstruction (2012)

On 5 September 2013 was put into operation new integrated transport terminal near the railway station with new bus platforms, little parking lot and roundabout.

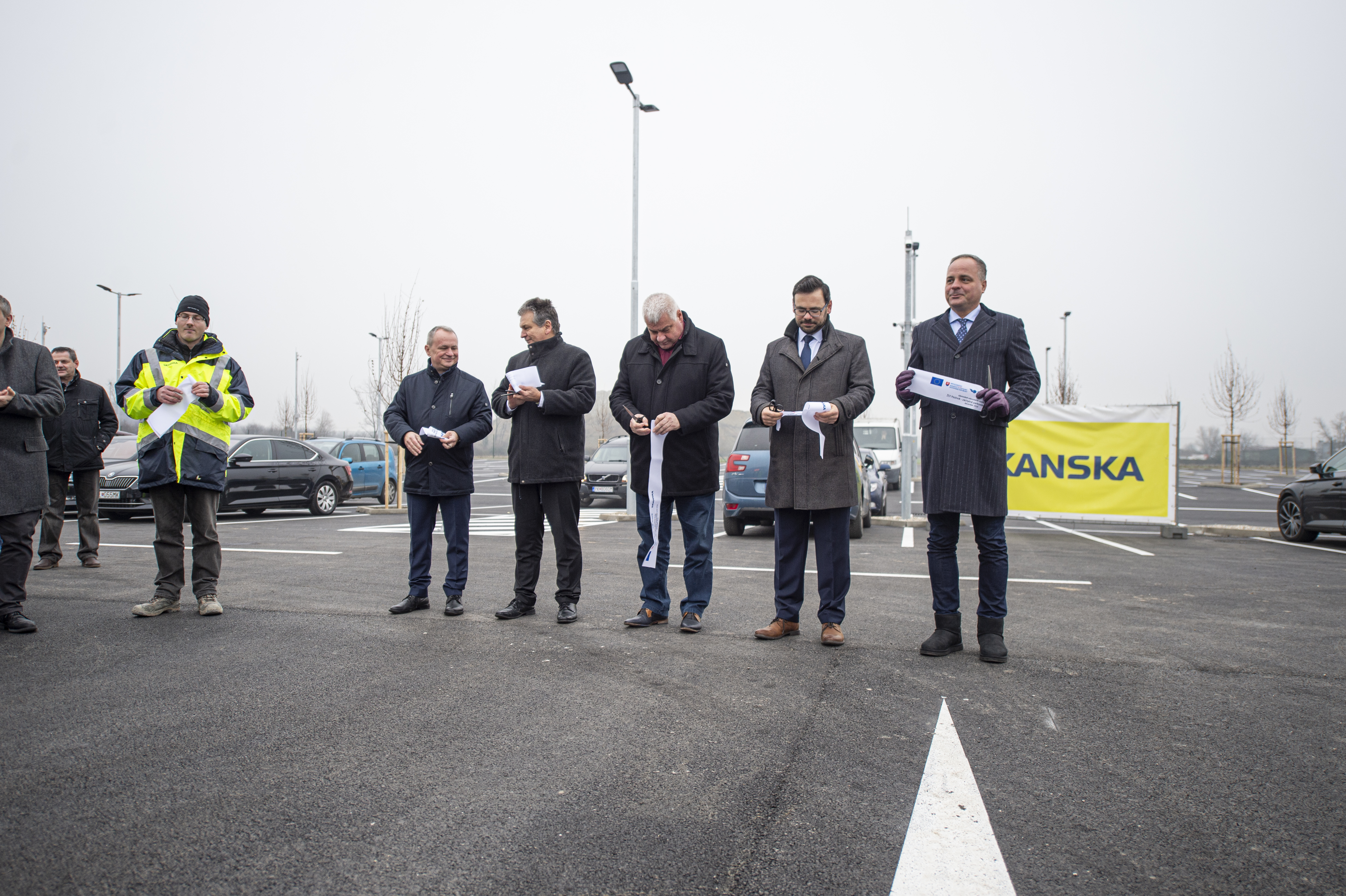
Grand opening of the new parking lot on Za drahou street

In Autumn 2019 there was also the fenced parking lot built on Za dráhou Street, which is connected to the station by the new extension of the subway. Its grand opening was on 12 December 2019.
