= Opekanec =

Small baked balls of yeast dough

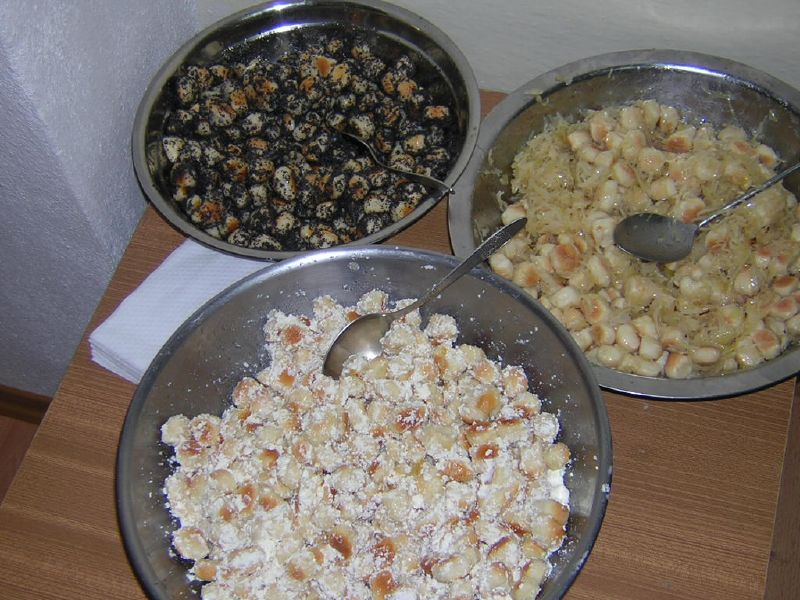
A Christmas Eve bobáľky from Eastern Slovakia

Opekance (dialectically bobáľky, pupáky, pupáčiky or pupáčky), in Slovak, are small balls of yeast dough baked in a baking dish so that they are gently pressed together. In singular it is opekanec (dialectically bobáľka, pupák, pupáčik or pupáčka).

== Christmas opekance ==
In Slovakia, they are usually served as a fasting food during Day before Christmas or as a special dish for Christmas Eve dinner. It is a floury food in the form of baked and scalded pieces. Traditionally, they are poured with hot milk and sprinkled with ground nuts, poppy seeds, quark or other sprinkles mixed with sugar. Sliced rolls can also be used as a substitute for leavened opekance.

== See also ==
- Makówki
