= Pezinok =

Pezinok Bazin
- Municipality
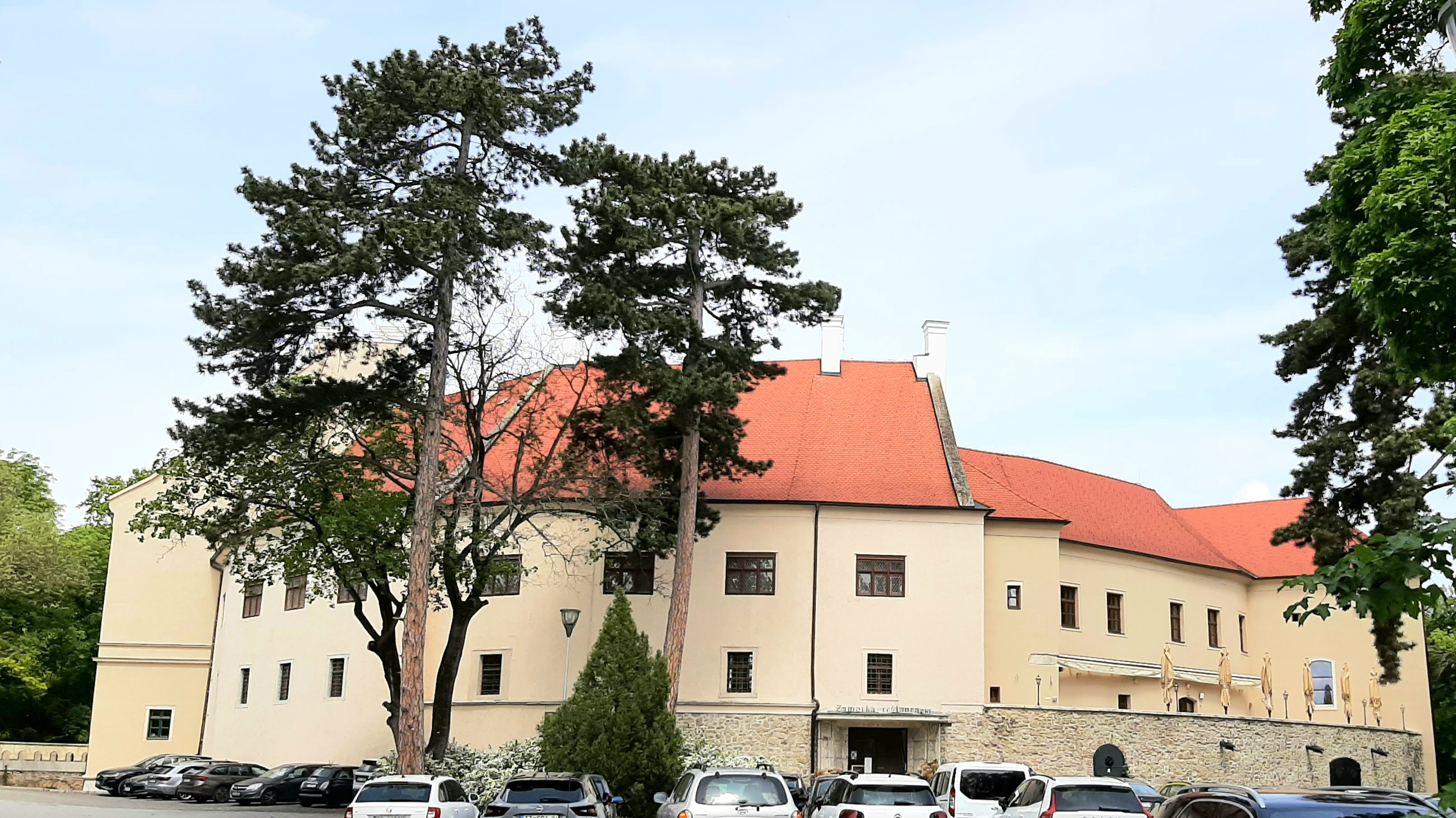
- Pezinok castle

- Flag Coat of arms
- Nicknames: Pezinek, Pavúci
- Location of Pezinok in the Bratislava Region Location of Pezinok in Slovakia
- Coordinates: 48.29°N 17.27°E
- Country: Slovakia
- Region: Bratislava Region
- District: Pezinok District
- First mentioned: 1208

Government
  - Mayor: Roman Mács

Area
  - Total: 72.75 km^{2} (28.09 sq mi)
- Elevation: 151 m (495 ft)

Population (2025)
  - Total: 24,340
- Time zone: UTC+1 (CET)
  - Summer (DST): UTC+2 (CEST)
- Postal code: 902 01
- Area code: +421 33
- Vehicle registration plate (until 2022): PK
- Website: www.pezinok.sk

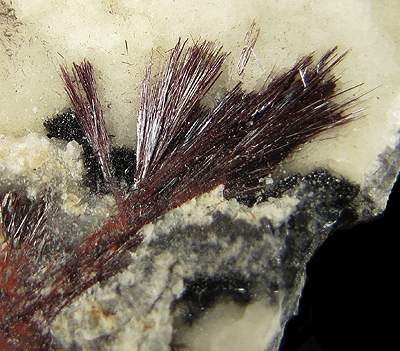
Classic wine-red kermesite crystals, up to 2.3 cm (0.91 in). long, on calcite-covered massive sulfide matrix. The Pezinok antimony deposits are known for world-class kermesite specimens.

Pezinok (Slovak pronunciation: [ˈpezinɔk]; in the local dialect Pezinek; Hungarian: Bazin; German: Bösing; Latin: Bazinium) is a town in southwestern Slovakia. It is roughly 20 km (12.43 mi) northeast of Bratislava and, as of December 2023, had a population of 24,443.

Pezinok lies near the Little Carpathians and thrives mainly on viticulture and agriculture, as well as on brick-making and ceramic(s) production.

== History ==
From the second half of the 10th century until 1918, it was part of the Kingdom of Hungary. Pezinok, or at least its surroundings, was mentioned in writing for the first time in 1208 under the name "terra Bozin". During the next few centuries, the town changed from a mining settlement to a vineyard town. It gained the status of a free royal town on 14 June 1647. Pezinok had its most glorious era of wealth and prosperity in the 17th and 18th centuries when it was also one of the richest towns in the Kingdom of Hungary. Its wealth was based on the production of quality wines. In the 19th century, the town slowly began to industrialize: the first sulphuric acid factory in Hungary or the known brickworks were established here. It boomed further after it was connected to the railway. After the breakup of Austria-Hungary in 1918/1920, the town became part of the newly created Czechoslovakia. In the first half of the 20th century, it was declining, vineyard production was declining, forcing many inhabitants to emigrate. It has been growing again since the end of World War II.

=== Jewish History of the Town ===
Jews were granted permission to live in Pezinok in 1450.

In 1529 The local counts, Counts Wolfang and George von Pezinok and St. George, began to imprison local Jews, due to the fact that they owed money to the Jewish community. Matters deteriorated further when the mutilated body of a local 9-year-old boy was found in the area, leading to a blood libel, an accusation that Jews had murdered Christians for religious rituals. The already imprisoned Jews were brought to the town square and tortured until they confessed to the murder and to additional crimes. On May 21, 1529, 30 Jewish men, women and children were burned at the stake. Children under the age of 10 were the only ones to receive a pardon, and they were forcibly converted to Christianity. After that point Jews were forbidden to reside in Pezinok, and even to spend a night there. In 1540 the Protestant reformer Andreas Osiander published a booklet condemning the 1529 blood libel. The booklet incriminated the Counts who started the whole thing.

Jews were allowed to return in 1609, but only to the lands of the Palffy family and in Cajla (Zeile). The rest of Pezinok remained forbidden until 1840. During that time period the Jewish community flourished in their allowed areas, building a synagogue and living in their communal lifestyle. Even with that, they were subject to an additional tax that other residents were not required to pay - a "toleration tax." In 1781 the census of the Palffy lands lists 88 Jews, while in 1840 there were 271. By 1930 there were 425 Jews living in Pezinok.

On March 14, 1939 Slovakia declared independence from Czechoslovakia. German SS troops entered the city soon after, and on May 18, 1939, the Hlinka Guard (the Slovak Storm Troopers) assembled the Jewish men of the city at the synagogue and forced them to destroy it and the holy books kept there. Jews were attacked in the streets and taken from their homes. At this point many of the Jews in the town fled, never to return. By 1940, there were 235 Jews left in Pezinok. The property of the Jews was legally taken by the non Jewish residents of the town and their homes were seized. In the Summer of 1942 the remaining Jews were deported to Auschwitz. The Jewish cemetery was blown up by the Germans, and the tombstones were used to pave roads. Few Jews returned after the Holocaust. There were 45 Jews listed in 1947, and after 1948–49, almost no Jews were left. There are currently no Jews listed as living in Pezinok.

== Geography and tourism ==
The municipality lies at an altitude of 151 metres (495 ft) and covers an area of 72.75 km^{2} (28.09 sq mi) (2025). It is located in the Danubian Lowland at the foothills of the Little Carpathians, around 20 km (12.43 mi) north-east of Bratislava. Another major city, Trnava, is located around 25 km (15.53 mi) to the east.

A ski resort is situated on the Baba mountain. The neighbouring Little Carpathians offer numerous hiking paths. All of the city forests are part of the Little Carpathians Protected Landscape Area.

The Little Carpathians Museum (Malokarpatské múzeum), which is in a typical wine merchant's house in the centre of the town, was undergoing a major renovation in 2008 and promises to be one of the best small museums in Slovakia.

It has the biggest collection of wine presses in central Europe, some of them gigantic wooden affairs dating from the early seventeenth century; the atmospheric old cellars of the building are partly given over to an exhibition of them.

Martin Hrubala, the deputy director of the museum, is keen to make the museum not just about the old but also the new: the entrance fee includes wine tasting, accompanied by a sommelier. other than tasting wine, Visitors will also get the opportunity to make their own.

Pezinok seems to have been investing heavily in public facilities lately: the city museum, in a building opposite the Little Carpathians Museum, opened in 2003. It features a range of attractively presented local archaeological finds and a selection of stonework salvaged from nearby churches; labelling, however, is in Slovak only.

And at the northern end of the city centre, next to a park which once formed its landscaped grounds, is Pezinok Castle. Originally a moated fortress which was later turned into a chateau for the aristocratic Pálffy family, the cellars of the castle are now home to the National Wine Salon.

Little Carpathians Museum (Malokarpatské múzeum) is situated in Pezinok.

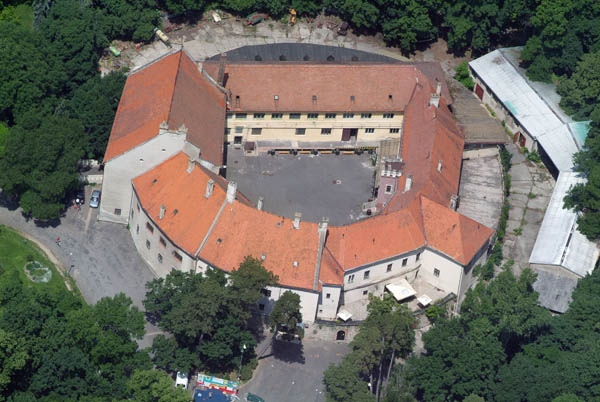

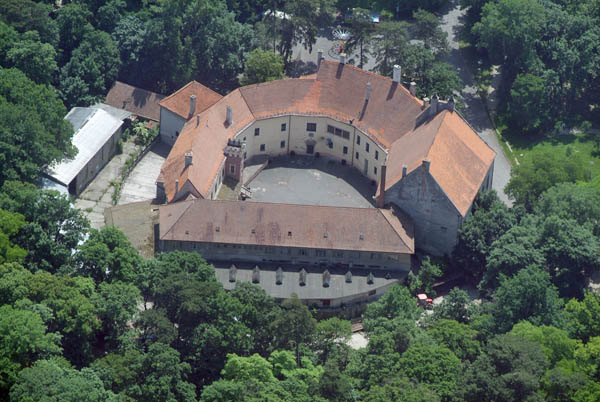

== Town suburbs ==
- Grinava historical suburb
- Town center
- Cajla historical suburb
- Sídliská:
  - Sever (English: North)
  - Juh (English: South)
  - Muškát
  - Záhradná (originally Stred)
  - Za hradbami and 1. mája (originally Stred II.)
  - Moyzesova (originally Prednádražie)
  - Starý dvor (English: Old yard)
  - Sahara
- Unigal
- Panholec
- Glejovka
- Čikošňa
- Turie brehy (English: Shores of cattles)
- Talihov dvor (English: Talih's yard; originally Natáliin majer)
- Recreation areas
  - Kučišdorfská dolina (English: Kučišdorf Valley)
  - Leitne
  - Reisinger
  - Slnečné údolie (English: Sun Valley)
  - Stupy

== Traditional Events ==
February

Ethnofestival

March

Selection of the Queen of wine

PAFF – alternative (amateur) film festival in House of Culture

April

Wine markets - international competition, exhibition and wine tasting

May

Ad Una Corda - International church choir festival {every even year}

Sponsorship march in support if UNICEF

June

Cibulák - theater festival

Competition of ancient cars

July

Slovakia Matador - competition of cars driving in The mountain {to the hill of Baba}

July - August

Promenade concerts take place as a part of Cultural sumer {every Sunday late afternoon}

Flamenco Verano summer flamenco school in Pezinok

August

Pezinský Permoník - Small Carpathian exhibition and bourse of minerals, fossils and precious stones connected with gold washing on the streets

Dychovky v preši - International festival of brass music

September

Vinobranie - celebrations of wine including rich cultural program and tasting of regional specialties{food and wine} in the streets of the city center

October

Pezinský strapec - International competition in ballroom dancing

November

St. Martin's blessings of wine includes tasting of young wine

Day of Open Cellars regional promotional wine tasting in private cellars

December

Christmas Inspirations - sell of Christmas goods Including cultural program on Radničné square and at Old Town hall

== Gastronomy ==
=== Typical dishes ===
In the past, the daily diet of local peasant families mainly included dishes based on flour such as knofle, osúchy, dolky, podlisníky, šiflíky, and potato mixture such as lokše, šuferle, gerheň, and scískance. The classic thick soups prepared mainly with beans or bean pods, lentils, peas, chickpeas or the integral horseradish soup were known and dill, pumpkin, potato, tomato or mushroom sauces or prívarky. At the time of pig slaughter, the so-called obarová polievka in which bread pieces were placed. At Easter, sourdough záviny filled with tvaroh, walnuts and poppy seeds, and veľkonočný baranček ("Easter lamb") were served. At Christmas, a vianočka and pupáky were served.

The traditional dish, lokše with goose or duck lard is shared with the nearby Slovenský Grob, and also part of the husacie or kačacie hody ("goose" or "duck festivals" – lokše with lard, roasted goose or duck and steamed red cabbage with strudel).

In the past, all hostince in the town offered mascený chleba s cibulou (in the Slovak literary language mastný chlieb s cibuľou, English: bread with lard and onions).

A competition sample of fyzulnačka at the eponymous cooking competition

In the second half of August, since 2003, the fyzulnačka (in the Slovak literary language fazuľovica or fazuľová polievka, English: bean soup) cooking competition has been organized in the Town Hall Square (Slovak: Radničné námestie).

Bufet Bedeč, a popular fast food stand with a long-term tradition at the town market on Kupeckého Street, sells not only the ordinary cigánska pečienka but also the regionally specific version with lokša incorporated into the food.

=== Typical drinks ===
The typical drink of the town is wine. In September, a burčiak is sold in Grinava and also during the Pezinok Grape Harvest Festival (Slovak: Pezinské vinobranie).

== Population ==
Historical population
Year	Pop.	±%
1970	13,872	—
1980	17,116	+23.4%
1991	20,515	+19.9%
2001	21,082	+2.8%
2011	21,179	+0.5%
2021	24,900	+17.6%
Source: Censuses

Population statistic (10 years)
Year	1995	2005	2015	2025
Count	21,660	21,334	22,467	24,340
Difference		−1.50%	+5.31%	+8.33%

Population statistic
Year	2024	2025
Count	24,375	24,340
Difference		−0.14%

It has a population of 24,340 people (31 December 2025).

=== Ethnicity ===
Census 2021 (1+%)
Ethnicity	Number	Fraction
Slovak	22,682	91.09%
Not found out	1797	7.21%
Czech	277	1.11%
Total	24,900	

In year 2021 was 24,900 people by ethnicity 22,682 as Slovak, 1797 as Not found out, 277 as Czech, 153 as Hungarian, 115 as Other, 89 as Romani, 78 as Rusyn, 71 as German, 64 as Russian, 56 as Ukrainian, 27 as Vietnamese, 24 as Bulgarian, 21 as Romanian, 17 as Serbian, 16 as Polish, 15 as Austrian, 14 as Italian, 14 as Croatian, 13 as Jewish, 12 as Moravian, 8 as Greek, 7 as Chinese, 5 as Irish, 4 as Turkish, 4 as Canadian, 3 as Silesian, 3 as French, 2 as Albanian, 1 as Korean and 1 as English.

Note on population: The difference values of population numbers in the table "Population statistic" and in the sections "Ethnicity" & "Religion" is caused by the use of various statistical methods.

=== Religion ===
Census 2021 (1+%)
Religion	Number	Fraction
Roman Catholic Church	11,402	45.79%
None	9044	36.32%
Not found out	1912	7.68%
Evangelical Church	1499	6.02%
Greek Catholic Church	268	1.08%
Total	24,900	

In year 2021 was 24,900 people by religion 11,402 from Roman Catholic Church, 9044 from None, 1912 from Not found out, 1499 from Evangelical Church, 268 from Greek Catholic Church, 121 from Ad hoc movements, 112 from Christian Congregations in Slovakia, 110 from Other, 103 from Eastern Orthodox Church, 59 from Buddhism, 56 from Jehovah's Witnesses, 50 from Other and not ascertained christian church, 30 from Paganism and natural spirituality, 26 from Calvinist Church, 21 from Baptists Church, 19 from Church of the Brethren, 16 from Islam, 13 from Jewish community, 10 from United Methodist Church, 9 from Old Catholic Church, 6 from Apostolic Church, 5 from Czechoslovak Hussite Church, 3 from Hinduism, 3 from Bahá'i Community, 2 from Seventh-day Adventist Church and 1 from Church of Jesus Christ of Latter-day Saints.

=== Most numerous town surnames (data from March 2001) ===
As of 31 December 2000, the town had 21,865 inhabitants, of which the most numerous surnames in Pezinok were:

- Krasňanský or Krasňanská (137 inhabitants)
- Guštafík(ová) (134 inhabitants)
- Horváth(ová) (118 inhabitants)
- Demovič(ová) (116 obyvateľov)
- Klamo(vá) (103 inhabitants)
- Hanúsek or Hanúsková (102 inhabitants)
- Slimák(ová) (101 inhabitants)
- Slezák(ová) (96 inhabitants)
- Čech(ová) (94 inhabitants)

== People ==
- Ján Bahýľ
- Zuzana Čaputová
- Moritz Fuerst
- Eduard Chmelár
- Ján Kupecký
- Filip Polc
- Ľudovít Rajter
- Richard Réti
- Dušan Slobodník
- Eugen Suchoň
- Oliver Solga
- Pavol Boriš
- Ján Štrba

== Climate ==
Pezinok has a humid continental climate (Köppen: Dfb).

Climate data for Pezinok
Month	Jan	Feb	Mar	Apr	May	Jun	Jul	Aug	Sep	Oct	Nov	Dec	Year
Mean daily maximum °C (°F)	2.7 (36.9)	5.7 (42.3)	10.7 (51.3)	16.5 (61.7)	20.8 (69.4)	25.1 (77.2)	27.1 (80.8)	26.7 (80.1)	21.2 (70.2)	15.3 (59.5)	9.0 (48.2)	3.6 (38.5)	15.4 (59.7)
Daily mean °C (°F)	0.2 (32.4)	2.4 (36.3)	6.2 (43.2)	11.3 (52.3)	15.9 (60.6)	20.0 (68.0)	21.7 (71.1)	21.2 (70.2)	16.2 (61.2)	11.0 (51.8)	6.1 (43.0)	1.3 (34.3)	11.1 (52.0)
Mean daily minimum °C (°F)	−2.5 (27.5)	−0.8 (30.6)	1.8 (35.2)	6.1 (43.0)	10.7 (51.3)	14.6 (58.3)	16.3 (61.3)	15.9 (60.6)	11.6 (52.9)	7.3 (45.1)	3.4 (38.1)	−1.0 (30.2)	7.0 (44.5)
Average precipitation mm (inches)	39.6 (1.56)	37.1 (1.46)	40.5 (1.59)	42.9 (1.69)	73.9 (2.91)	73.5 (2.89)	69.6 (2.74)	73.5 (2.89)	76.0 (2.99)	51.4 (2.02)	46.4 (1.83)	42.6 (1.68)	667 (26.25)
Source: Weather.Directory

== Twin towns — sister cities ==
Pezinok is twinned with:

- Neusiedl am See, Austria
- Mosonmagyaróvár, Hungary
- Mladá Boleslav, Czech Republic
- Kyjov, Czech Republic
- Izola, Slovenia

== See also ==
- Amphitheater Pezinok
- Atlas klub
- Koncert mladosti
- Sahara Shopping Park
- Pezinok-Rozálka airport
