= Sídlisko Sever, Pezinok =

Sídlisko Sever
- Neighborhood
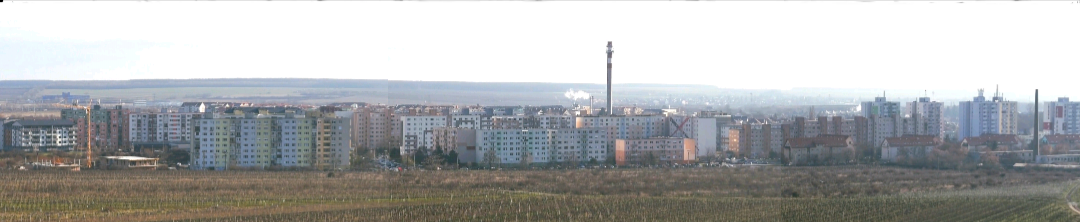
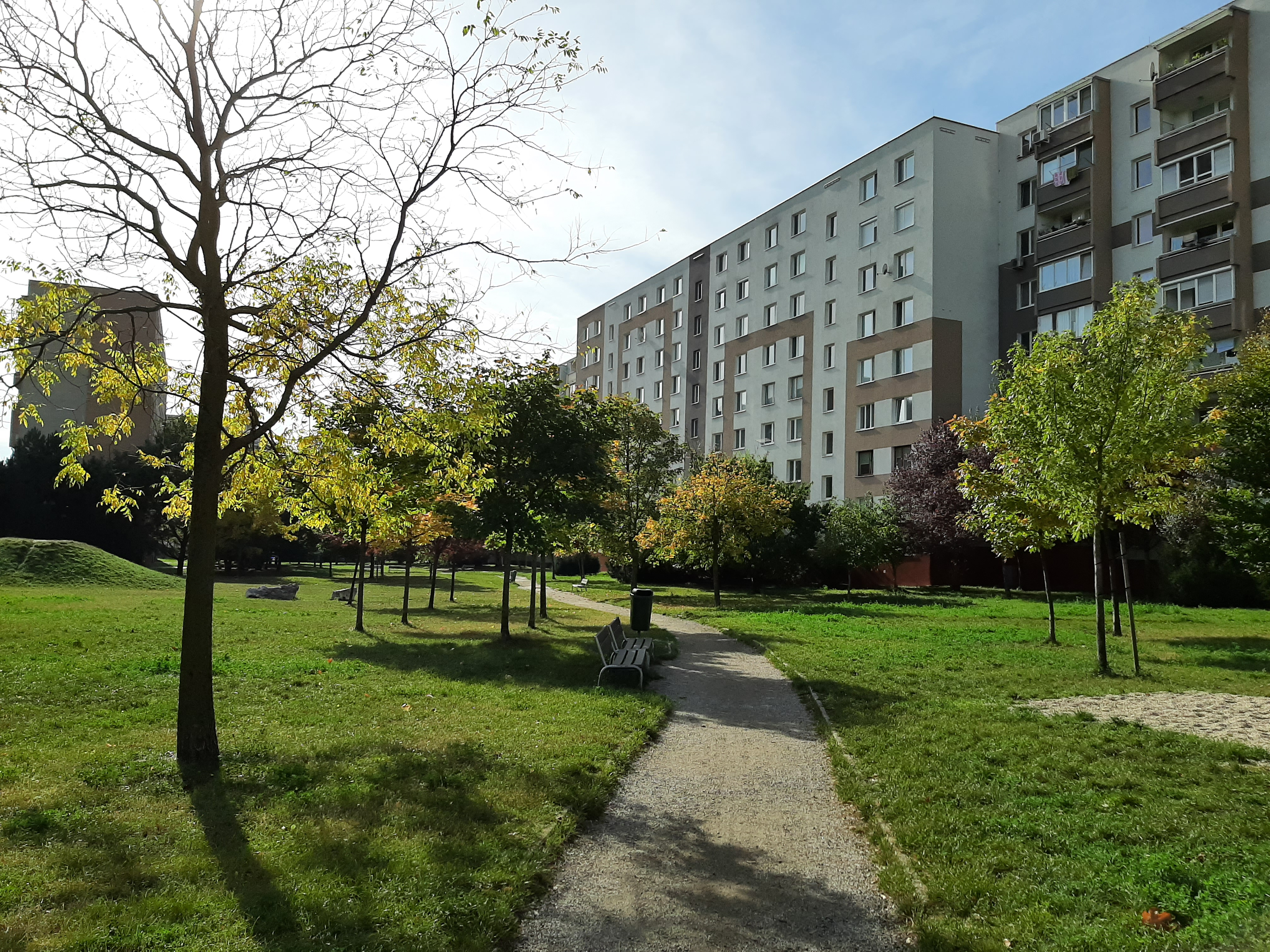
- Sídlisko Sever panoramatic view and Nový park ("New Park") surrounded by apartment buildings

- Location of Sídlisko Sever, Pezinok in Slovakia
- Coordinates: 48.297955°N 17.265916°E
- Country: Slovakia
- Region: Bratislava
- District: Pezinok
- Town: Pezinok
- Suburb: Cajla
- First mention: 1973 (project); 1980 (1st stage); 1990 (2nd stage); 2008 (Sever II); 2018 (Sever III – Rozália)
- Residential zones: Sever; Sever II; Sever III – Rozália
- Postal code: 902 01
- Car plate: PK

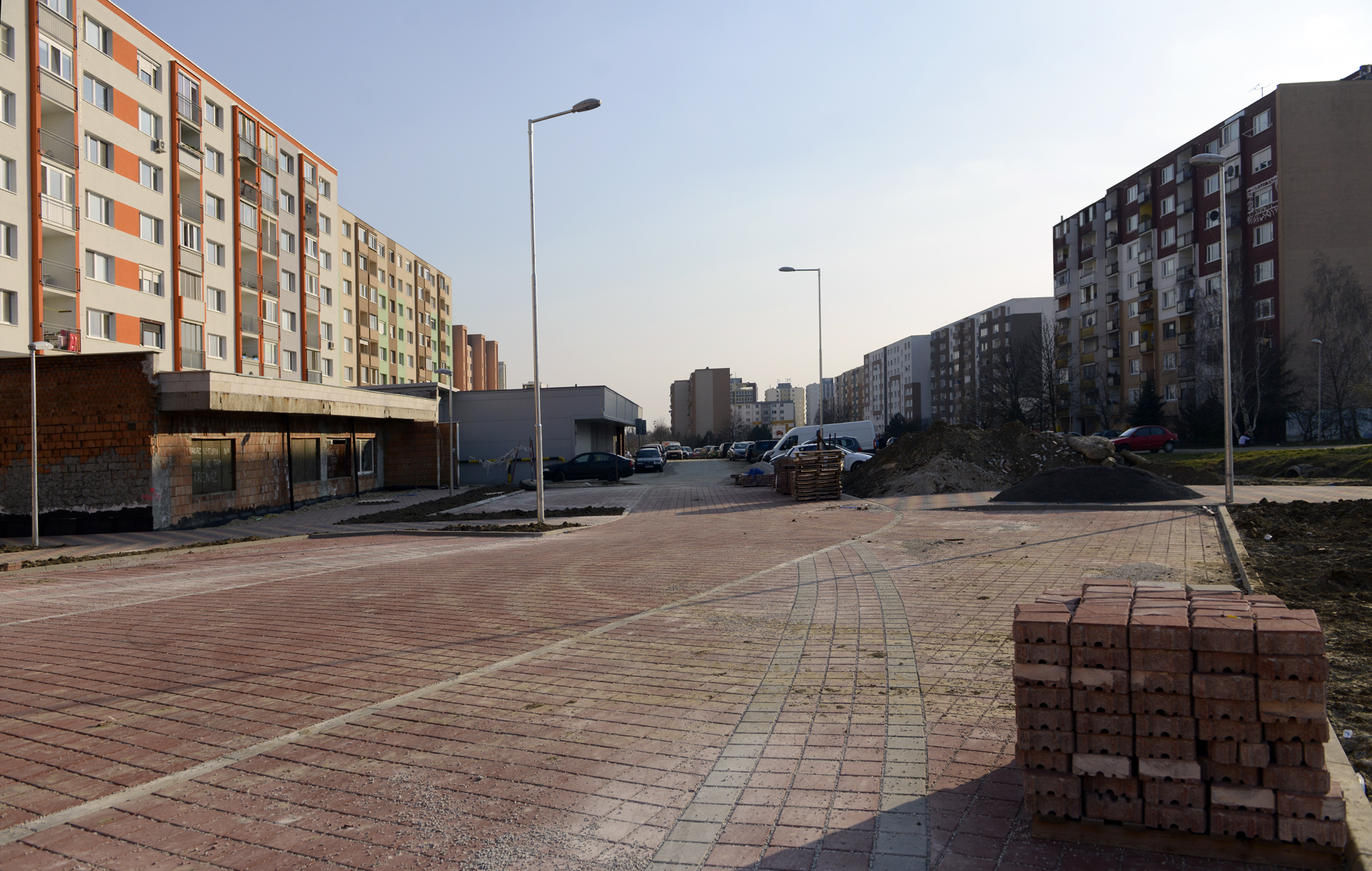
Sídlisko Sever from the north in 2015

Sídlisko Sever (Slovak pronunciation: ['siːdliskɔ 'seʋer], literally "North housing estate") is the largest sídlisko in Pezinok, Slovakia. It is located in the northern part of the town near Rozálka and Cajla historical suburb. It is two kilometers from the town center.

Sídlisko Sever is located on the site of the 18th-century town fields named Rosalien. The first stage of construction of the original Sever housing estate took place in 1980s, when military apartment houses were built, and in the 1990s other (panel) apartment buildings were completed According to data from 1999, it spread over an area of 5.5 hectares and there were 1,756 apartments in which 5,600 inhabitants lived.

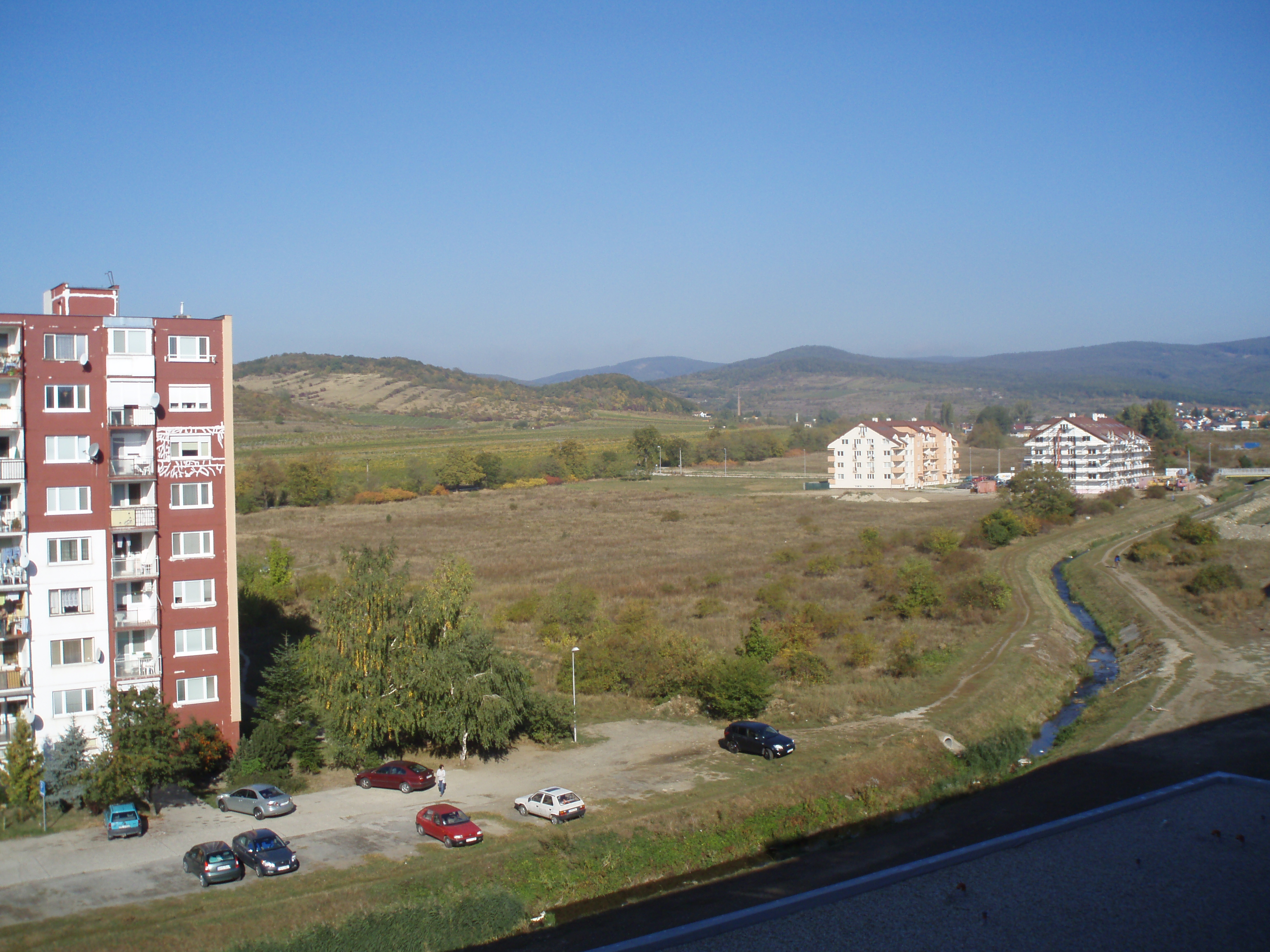
View of the Sever II residential zone (right) a and to the location of the current Sever III – Rozália residential zone (Sasinkova Street) in 2012

In 2007, Dona Sandtnera Street was established, where the Sever II residential complex has been built since 2008. In the fall of 2019, the construction of the Sever III – Rozália residential zone with new Sasinkova Street began and from October 2020 to 2023, the Severky apartment buildings were built on Dona Sandtnera Street.

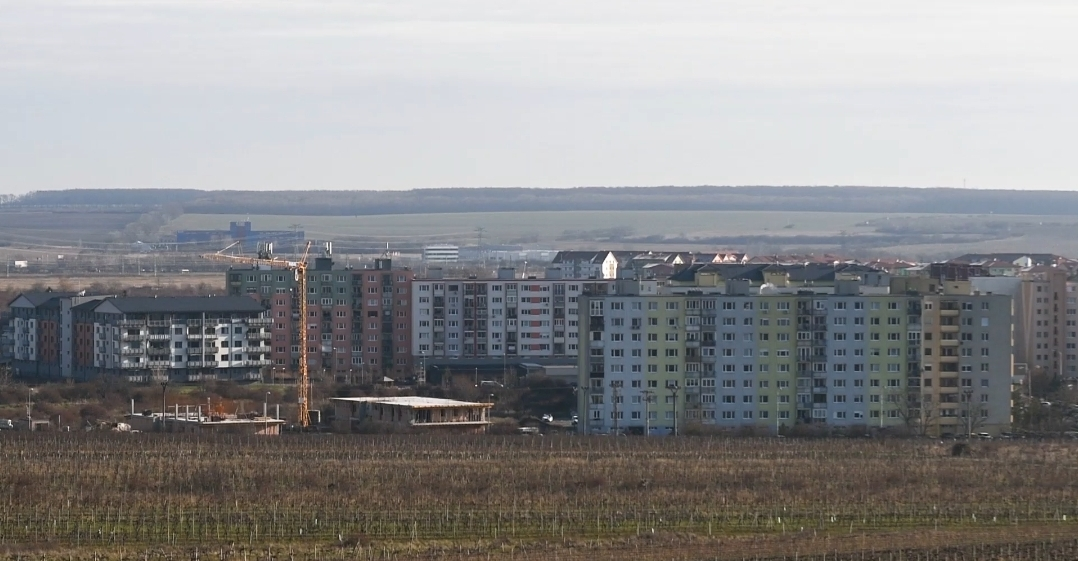
Sever III – Rozália residential zone under construction in 2021

== Amenities ==
There are two grocery stores available for residents of the housing estate, the Bageta store selling fresh bakery products, an Obel-liks pizzeria, two pubs, a store with newspapers and tobacco products. There is also a post office, the Sever pharmacy and the urban summer swimming pool. Specialized stores are concentrated in more lucrative places, in the town center, where the most people move and do more shopping.
