= Lokša =

Type of potato pancake

Lokšas on trays

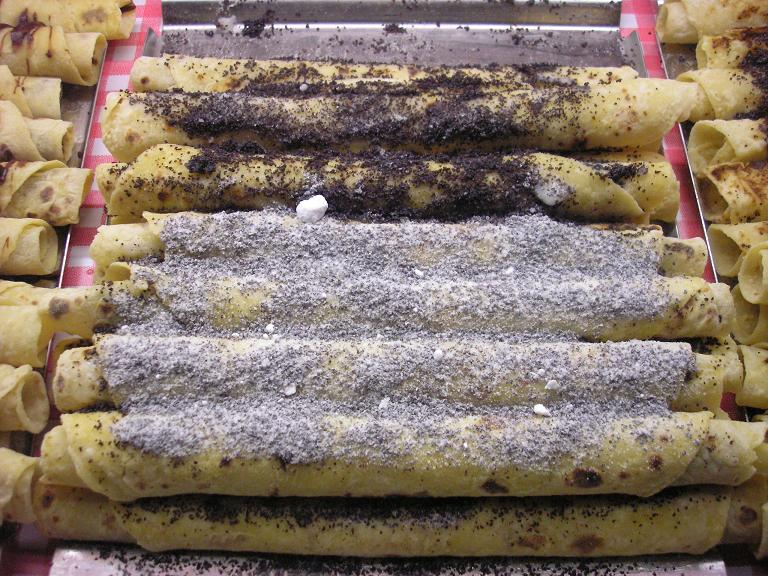
Sweet lokšas with sugar and poppy seeds

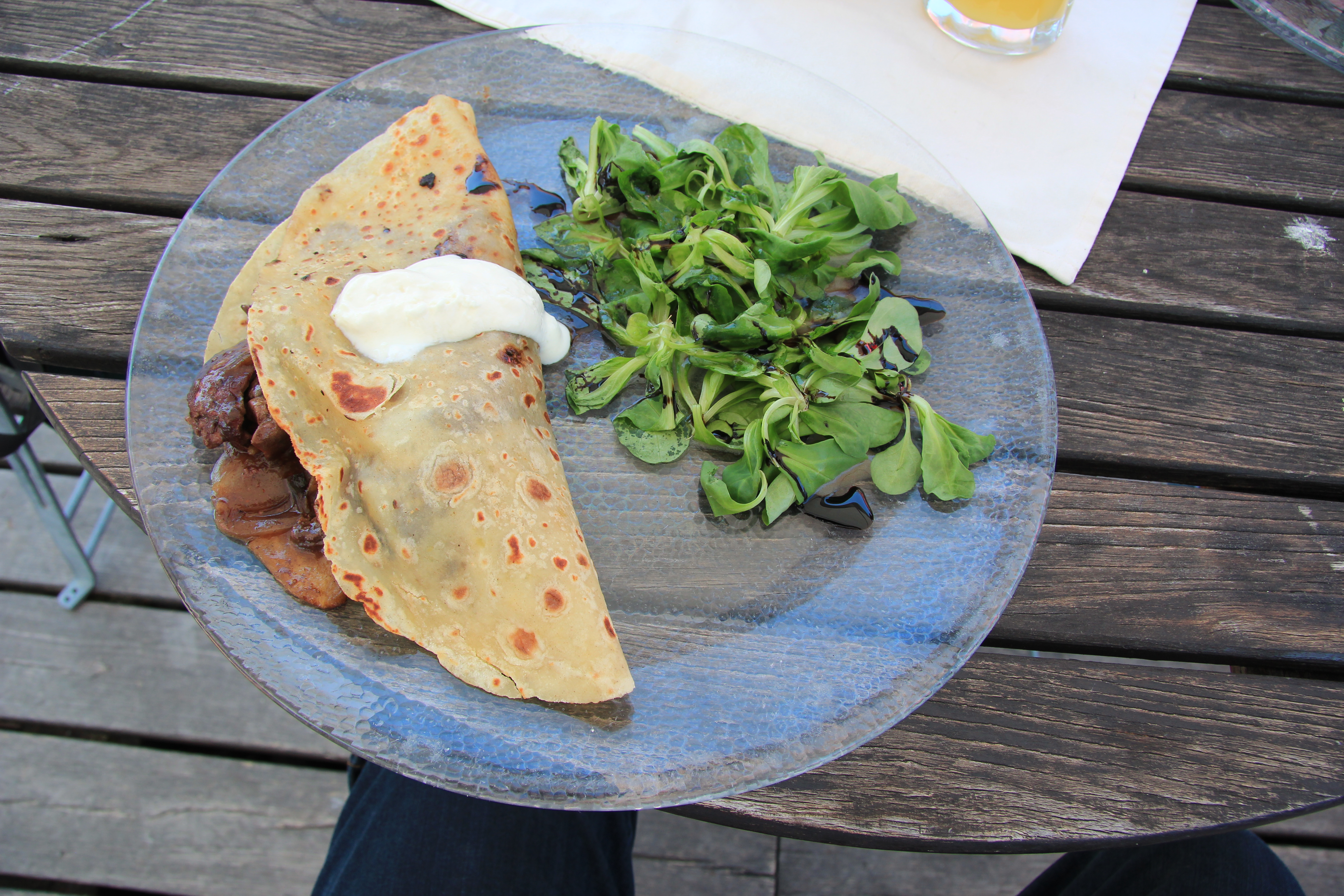
Lokša with chicken liver and corn salad

Lokša or lokše (Slovak pronunciation: [ˈlɔkʂa] and [ˈlɔkʂe] respectively; may be written in English as loksha or lokshe) is a type of potato pancake like flatbread, popular in the cuisine of Slovakia and South Moravian Region of the Czech Republic. In South Moravia, lokše is also a term for wide noodles added to soups.

== Name ==
Lokšas are also regionally known as lata, přesňák, šumpál or patenta in the Czech Republic, and lokeš or lokoš in Slovakia.

== Preparation ==
Lokšas are made from boiled unpeeled potatoes, which are later peeled, grated, and mixed with flour and salt. The dough is made and rolled out into the thin pancakes, which are baked dry on a hot plate. In Slovakia, the salty variant is more popular, where the finished pancakes are spread with lard (preferably goose), and tasted to the soup, or filled with sauerkraut or minced meat. Goose curls are especially famous for Slovenský Grob. The Moravians traditionally prepare sweet lokšes, which are smeared with jam, rolled up like pancakes and sprinkled with poppy seeds, and sugar, sometimes also poured over melted butter.

== See also ==
- Tortilla
