= Sahara Shopping Park =

- SAHARA Shopping Park
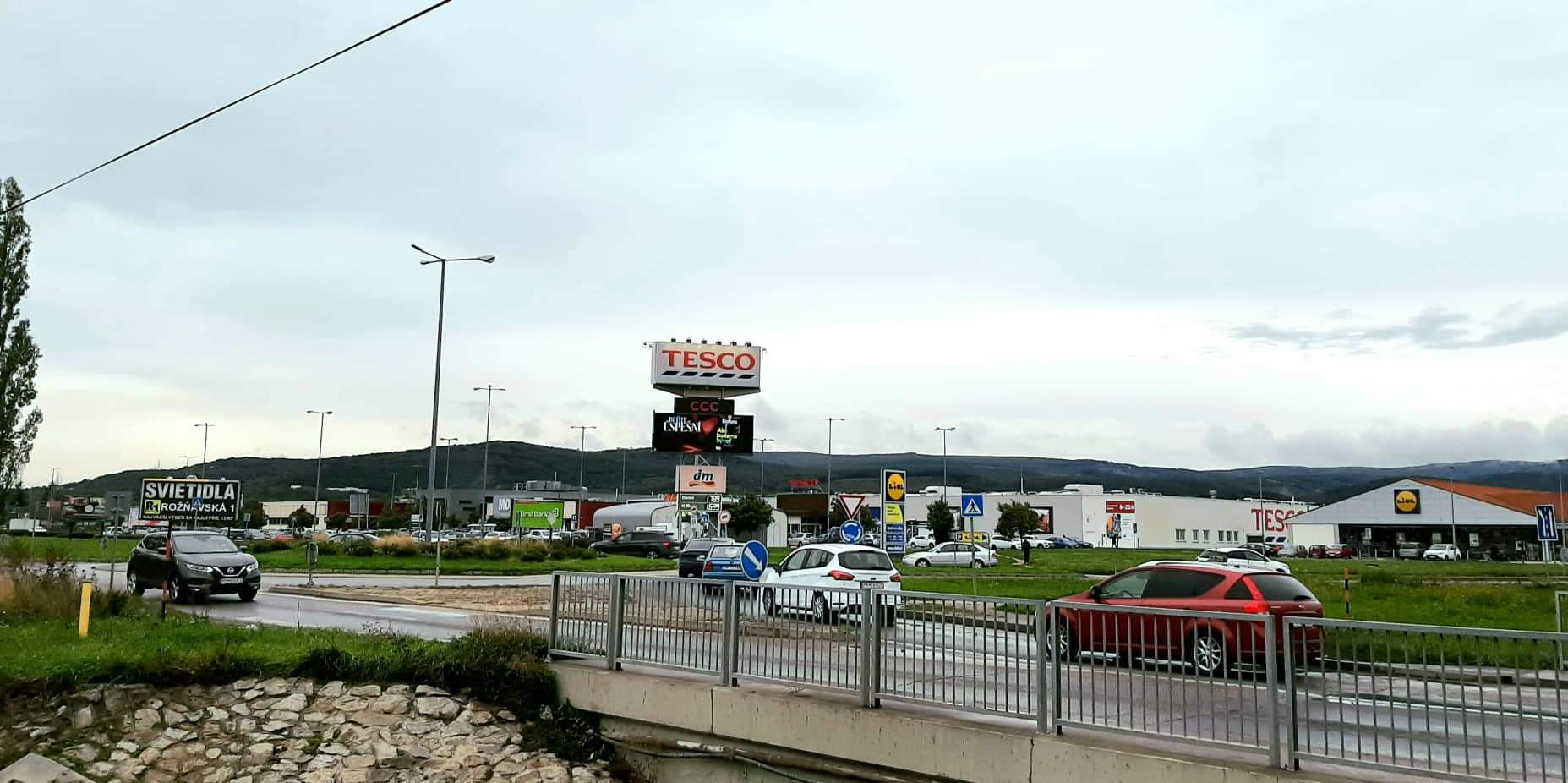
- Sahara Shopping Park in 2022
- Location: Sahara, Pezinok, Slovakia
- Coordinates: 48.278085°N 17.255617°E
- Address: Myslenická 2A–C, Okružná 1, and Obchodná 8–18
- Opened: 10. July 2004 (TESCO); 24 September 2005 (NC Mólo); 17 August 2006 (Lidl)
- Floor area: 105,000 square metres (1,130,210.6 sq ft)
- Floors: 1

Sahara Shopping Park or SAHARA Shopping Park is a commercial zone on Myslenická, Okružná, and Obchodná Street in Sahara, Pezinok, Slovakia.

== History ==
First mentioned in 1996, the Nákupné centrum Mólo shopping mall, the TESCO department store and hypermarket building, the Lidl supermarket building, the Bageta bakery building, and STAMET tool shop building belong in the zone.

The Kaufland department store has operated since 2017.
