= Grinava =

- Suburb
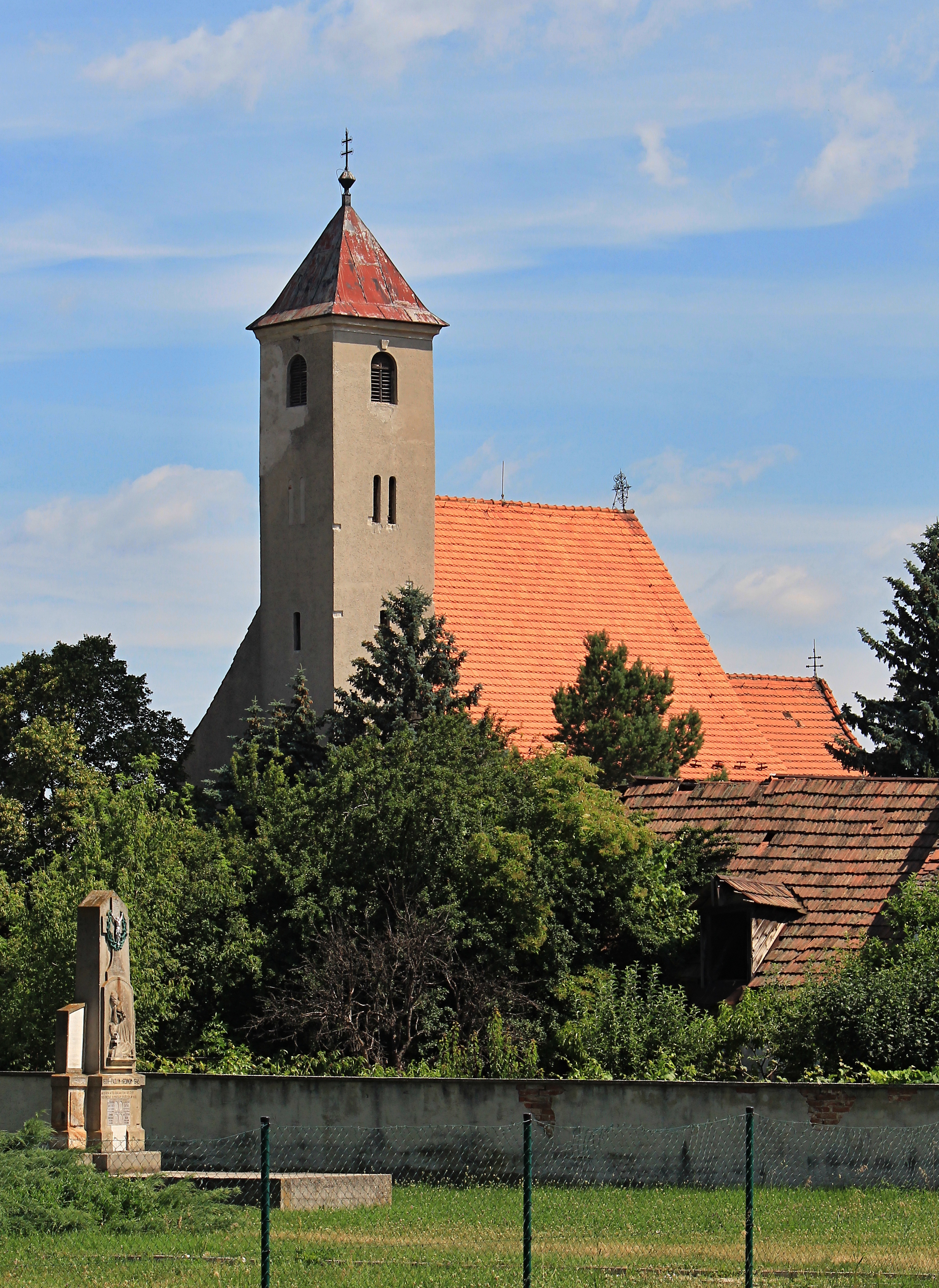
- Saint Sigmund Roman Catholic Church and war memorial in Grinava

- Location within Slovakia
- Coordinates: 48°16′N 17°15′E
- Country: Slovakia
- Region: Bratislava
- District: Pezinok
- Town: Pezinok
- Postal code: 902 03
- Website: grinava.com

Grinava (Hungarian: Grinád, German: Grünau) is a historical village in Slovakia, since 1 July 1975 a suburb of the town of Pezinok.

== History ==
During World War 1, a prison camp for American POWs was located in the village. Towards the end of the Second World War there was fighting in and around Grinava between German and Soviet forces.

== Monuments ==
There are historical monuments there, such as the Church of St. Sigismund from the 14th century originally built by Saxon colonists, Evangelical Church of the Augsburg Confession, Hodossy Manor, which is currently privately owned and used only as a residence, and Strapák's Mill from the second half of the 18th century, which is currently privately owned. One of the dominant town suburb features is the Smylo-Pálffy Manor (Grunfeld), in which the torture of Dominik Virgovič took place in 1945, and which, together with the premises of the former JRD in which it is located, was abandoned by 2022 and was in danger of being demolished.

In the park of Grinava there are two monuments dedicated to the victims of the First World War and the Second World War.

== Etymology ==
Under the Czechoslovak Republic (1948–1990) the village was renamed Myslenice. It has since reverted to its earlier name. Myslenice is still commonly used and the main street of Grinava is also named after it.

== Sport ==
There is a Football pitch in the town suburb, where the football club GFC 1923 plays.

== Notable people ==
- Anton Filkorn (1873–1934), organizer of the spiritual and social life of Slovaks in the U.S.
- MUDr. Ján Fröhlich (1892–?), former deacon in military hospitals, field curate on the Piave during World War I and chaplain in Spišská Nová Ves in 1919.
- Dominik Virgovič (1912–1945), citizen of Grinava, alleged partisan, victim of torture and later hanging
- Prof. ThDr. h. c. Ján Michalko (1912–1990), Evangelical priest, general bishop of the Evangelical Church in Slovakia, theologian, homiletic, Christian philosopher and ethicist, religious publicist.
- Jozef Franko (born 1951), sculptor and ceramist.
