= Cajla =

- Suburb
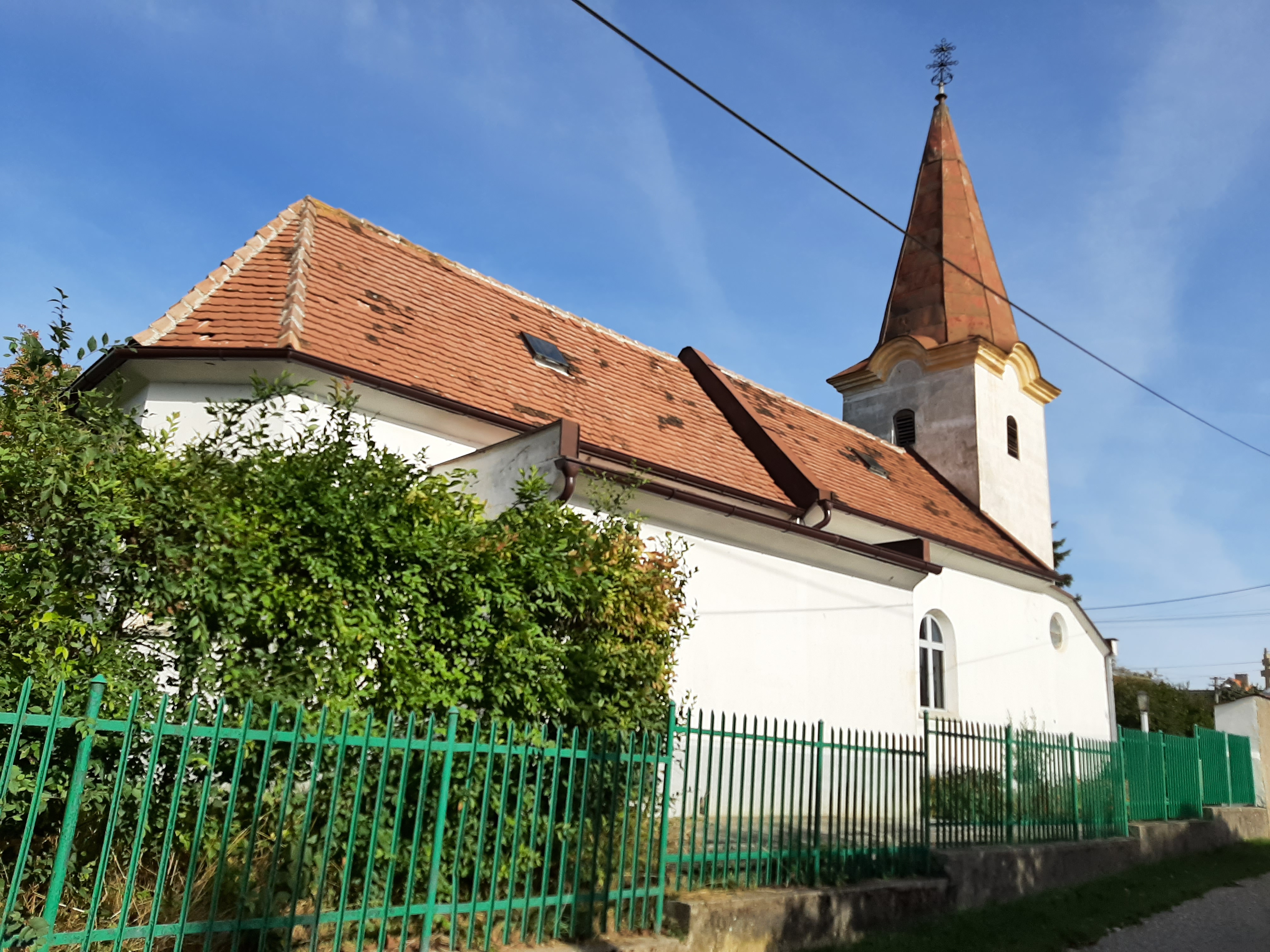
- Church of the Exaltation of the Holy Cross in Cajla

- Location within Slovakia
- Coordinates: 48.303565°N 17.270789°E
- Country: Slovakia
- Region: Bratislava
- District: Pezinok
- Town: Pezinok
- First mentioned: 1425

Government
  - Richtár: Jozef Kanka
- Postal code: 902 03
- Website: cajla.estranky.sk

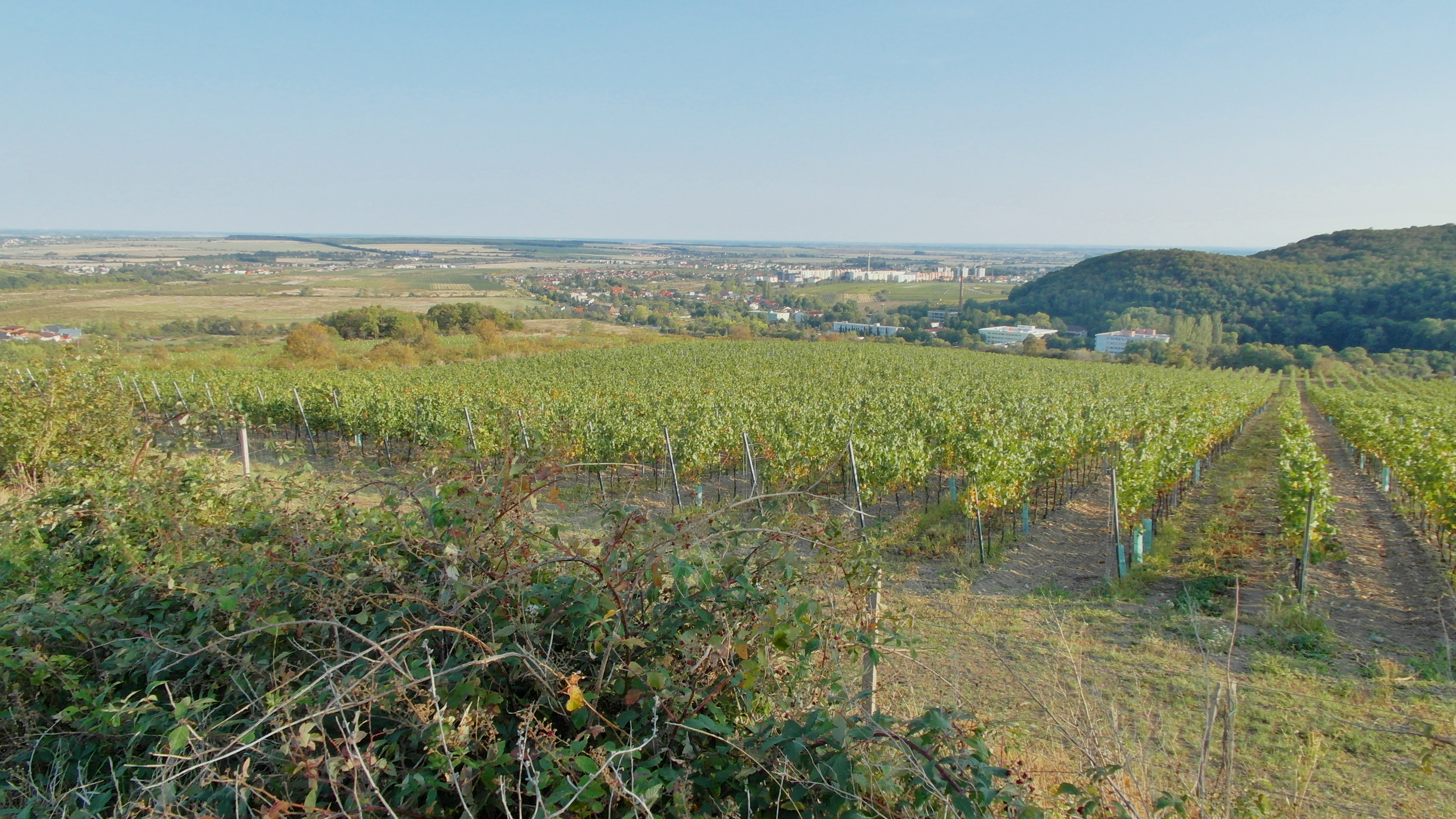
Wineyards with Cajla in background

Cajla (German: Zeil, Hungarian: Cajla) is a former village, now a historical suburb of Pezinok, Slovakia. Until 1 January 1948, it was an independent municipality and since that date it is part of Pezinok and is its branch parish.

The name originated in 15th century when the village consisted of 26 estates arranged in one row (German: Zeile). The Church of the Exaltation of the Holy Cross, which was built in 1740, is located in Cajla. It replaced the original medieval St. Joseph Church which was built in 1659 on the site of the original St. Nicholas Church in the settlement of Zumberg and which was located near today's Philippe Pinel Psychiatric Hospital. This church is only remembered by the statue of Christ the King, because its ruins were later covered with a new road. The Calvary of Cajla is located near the psychiatric hospital which is also nearby Kučišdorf Valley. Behind the village, there was the first sulfuric acid factory which after 1882 was replaced by the administrative buildings of the antimony mines directorate. Next to the former buildings of the antimony mines, later the psychiatric hospital buildings, there was the Pálffy Paper Mill which no longer exists and whose main building was converted into a grain mill after its closure which burned down in the summer of 1934. Since then, Fabian's Mill has stood on the site of the old mill.

Since 30 April 2024, the richtár (Slovak historical word for „mayor") of Cajla is Jozef Kanka.

== Documented historical names ==
Documented are these historical names:

- 1343: Ujfalu (Slovak: Nová dedina, Nová ves; English: New Village)
- 1425: Czayel
- 1783: Zajla
- 1733, 1773, 1839, 1915: Czajla

== Sport ==
There is a football field (also known as the Baník Stadium) in the suburb where the football club CFK Pezinok-Cajla operates.
