= Pavol Boriš =

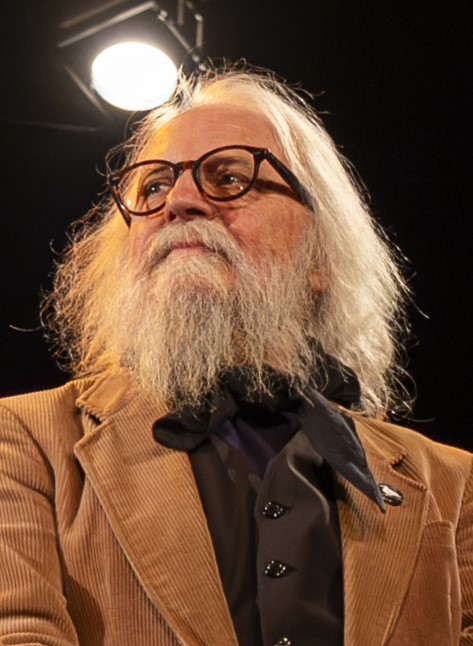
- Pavol Boriš in 2024
- Born: 28 October 1954 (age 71); Šaľa, Czechoslovakia
- Other names: Paľo Boriš; Krompáč; Ynžynýr
- Citizenship: Slovakia
- Education: Faculty of Mechanical Engineering, SVŠT
- Occupations: vigneron; author
- Known for: Koncert mladosti, pereg of the Pezinok Grape Harvest Festival
- Spouse: Edita Borišová (m. 1980)
- Children: Martin (born 1984); Zuzana (born 1987)
- Parents: Ján Boriš (father); Mária Borišová (née Tonková) (mother)
- Relatives: Ján Boriš (brother)

Pavol "Paľo" Boriš (born 28 October 1954) is a Slovak small-scale wine producer and author. He is also former coordinator of hobby and artistic activities of SZM local organization in Pezinok, high school teacher and municipal councillor. He is known as the second main organizer and also the organizer of both years of the Koncert mladosti festival, and since 2023 as pereg (wine richtár) of the Pezinok Grape Harvest Festival.

== Biography ==
He was born in Šaľa on 28 October 1954. In the summer of 1947, his parents moved to a house in the village of Neded. Since 1961, he has lived in Pezinok. He moved here definitively on 17 October 1962 and as a second-grade pupil began attending elementary school on Fándlyho Street.

In the early 1970s he met Ján Štrba on a train, who was carrying a large reel-to-reel tape recorder, and they became friends. In 1974 he graduated from electrical maturita and from 1976 to 1981 he studied mechanical engineering technology at the Faculty of Mechanical Engineering, SVŠT in Bratislava. After the Koncert mladosti festival was banned, he was summoned for questioning as a co-organizer and punished by being prohibited from officially acting as a cultural coordinator of the SZM local organization. His friend Ľubomír "Jačmeň" Janečka, who was the so-called sideman of the team of people around Paľo Boriš, was appointed to his position. In the fall of 1982, he completed a basic military service in 65th Motor Rifle Regiment in Cheb.

He was involved in the VPN. Between 1989 and 2001, he was a teacher of mechanical engineering subjects at the Secondary Vocational School (Slovak: Stredné odborné učilište). He was a member of the town council in Pezinok from 1990 to 1998. From its founding until 2005, he worked on the committee of the Zväz vinohradníkov a vinárov Pezinok (English: Pezinok Winegrowers' and Winemakers' Association).

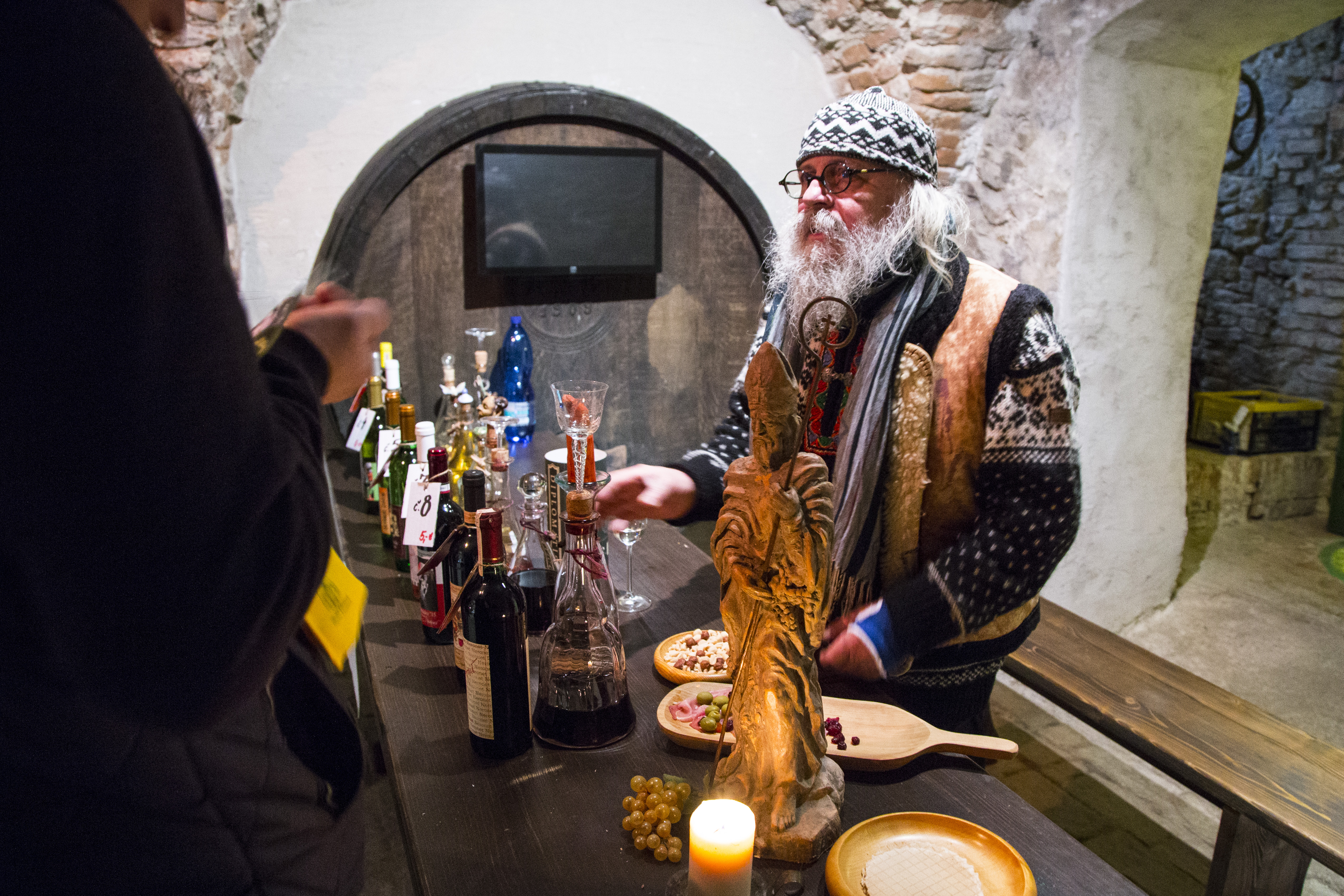
Pavol Boriš during the Grand Opening of the Pezinské vínne pivnice (Pezinok Wine Cellars) festival in the Small Carpathian Museum, Pezinok in February 2017.

In 2002 or 2003, he became a chief and a main organizer of the newly created event called Fyzulnačka.

Boriš' vineyards are located in Škridláky hunt (hon) in Pezinok wine district (rajón).

Together with Peter Bittner and photographer Ján Štrba, they are the authors of three books: the first edition of Pezinok – bigbeatown with a compilation CD (2001), Koncerty mladosti ´76, ´77 – Československý Woodstock (2007), and the second edition of Pezinok – bigbeatown (2024). Boriš and Bittner are also considered chroniclers of 1960s music in Pezinok.

== Personal life ==
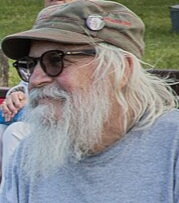
Pavol Boriš at the Modranská železnica in 2023

In 1980, he married his wife Edita and is the father of Martin (born 1984) and Zuzana (born 1987).

== Works ==
- Boriš, Pavol and Bittner, Peter (2001). Pezinok – bigbeatown. 1. ed. Renesans. ISBN 80-968427-2-2.
- Boriš, Pavol; Štrba, Ján; Bittner, Peter (2007). Koncerty mladosti ´76, ´77 – Československý Woodstock.
- Boriš, Pavol (2022). Moje zimné písačky. Pezinok : Vydavateľstvo Jela Pálešová, Impalex. ISBN 978-80-570-3285-4.
- Boriš, Pavol; Štrba, Ján; Bittner, Peter (2024). Pezinok – bigbeatown. 2. ed.

== Awards ==
- 2023: Award of the Mayor of Pezinok for an active life connected with cultural events in Pezinok and in the field of winemaking
