= 13154 Petermrva =

Stony Flora asteroid

Discovery
- Discovered by: A. Galád; A. Pravda
- Discovery site: Modra Obs.
- Discovery date: 7 September 1995

Designations
- Named after: Peter Mrva (Slovak amateur astronomer)
- Alternative designations: 1995 RC · 1972 TL_{6}
- Minor planet category: main-belt · Flora

Orbital characteristics
- Epoch 4 September 2017 (JD 2458000.5)
- Uncertainty parameter 0
- Observation arc: 44.58 yr (16,282 days)
- Aphelion: 2.5790 AU
- Perihelion: 1.8401 AU
- Semi-major axis: 2.2095 AU
- Eccentricity: 0.1672
- Orbital period (sidereal): 3.28 yr (1,200 days)
- Mean anomaly: 230.03°
- Mean motion: 0° 18^{m} 0.36^{s} / day
- Inclination: 5.5206°
- Longitude of ascending node: 331.59°
- Argument of perihelion: 59.149°

Physical characteristics
- Dimensions: 4.170±0.239 km 4.176 km 4.18 km (taken)
- Synodic rotation period: 2.9848±0.0002 h (Note: Pravec (2008) web: lightcurve plot-A and lightcurve plot-B of (13154) Petermrva rotation period 2.9848±0.0002 hours with a brightness amplitude of 0.14 mag. The Collaborative Asteroid Lightcurve Link rates the observations with a quality code of 3 (U=3), which denotes a secure result within the precision given and no ambiguity. Summary figures at Collaborative Asteroid Lightcurve Link (CALL) and Ondrejov Asteroid Photometry Project, Pravec, P.; Wolf, M.; Sarounova, L.); 2.98502±0.00004 h
- Geometric albedo: 0.1464; 0.152±0.020
- Spectral type: S
- Absolute magnitude (H): 14.1 · 14.11±0.03 (R) · 14.46±0.32 · 14.56 · 14.6±0.058

13154 Petermrva, provisional designation 1995 RC, is a stony Flora asteroid from the inner regions of the asteroid belt, approximately 4.2 kilometers in diameter. It was discovered on 7 September 1995, by Slovak astronomers Adrián Galád and Alexander Pravda at the Modra Observatory in the Bratislava Region of Slovakia. The asteroid was named after Slovak amateur astronomer Peter Mrva.

== Orbit and classification ==
Petermrva is a member of the Flora family, one of the largest families of stony asteroids. It orbits the Sun in the inner main-belt at a distance of 1.8–2.6 AU once every 3 years and 3 months (1,200 days). Its orbit has an eccentricity of 0.17 and an inclination of 6° with respect to the ecliptic. The first precovery was taken at Crimea-Nauchnij in 1972, extending the asteroid's observation arc by 23 years prior to its discovery.

== Physical characteristics ==
Two well-defined rotational lightcurves of Petermrva were obtained from photometric observations at the Modra and Ondřejov Observatory rendered a rotation period of 2.98502±0.00004 and 2.9848±0.0002 hours, with a brightness amplitude of 0.18 and 0.14 in magnitude, respectively (U=3/3).

According to the thermal observation carried out by the NEOWISE mission of NASA's Wide-field Infrared Survey Explorer, Petermrva measures 4.2 kilometer and has an untypically low albedo of 0.15.

== Naming ==
This minor planet is named after Slovak amateur astronomer Peter Mrva (born 1962) who participated in the construction the discovering Modra Observatory, after which the minor planet 11118 Modra is named. He was also one of the first observers at the newly installed observatory. The second discoverer, Alexander Pravda, is thankful for his explanation and inspiration in some fields of astronomy and computer graphics. The approved naming citation was published by the Minor Planet Center on 27 April 2002 (M.P.C. 45338).
