= Atlas klub =

Atlas klub (Espresso, Klub mladých)
- "Píčbar" (1960s)
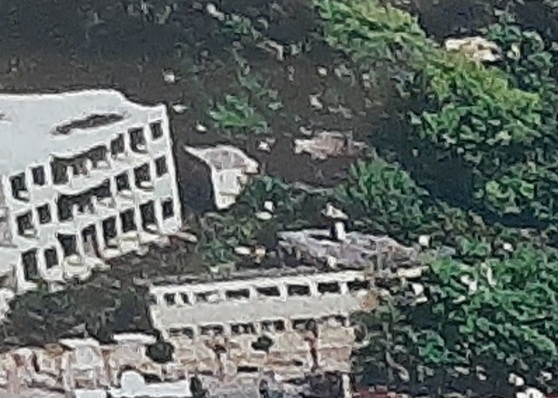
- The building where the Atlas klub was located, shortly before demolition (in the middle) with the skeleton of the future apartment building (left)
- Interactive map of Atlas klub (Espresso, Klub mladých)
- Address: Mladoboleslavská (formerly Sládkovičova) 1; 902 01 Pezinok; Slovakia
- Location: Pezinok, Slovakia
- Coordinates: 48.289866°N 17.267592°E
- Owner: Czechoslovak Socialist Youth Union
- Operator: Pezinok 1 Socialist Youth Union Local Organisation
- Type: youth club (concert hall and bar)

Construction
- Opened: late 1950s/early 1960s (Espresso), early 1970s (Klub mladých), 1973 (Atlas klub)
- Closed: 1990s
- Demolished: 2006–2008

The Atlas klub (Pezinok), Klub Atlas Sládkovičova or Atlas-klub (literally "Atlas Club", formerly Espresso, Klub mladých) was a youth club on the ground floor of the southwest part of the urban outdoor swimming pool building in Pezinok, Slovakia.

== History ==
Former Espresso, nicknamed "Píčbar", operating in the 1960s was a place where music sessions, phonotheques, bubble sessions, etc. took place. It disappeared in 1969 and later the building belonged to the Czechoslovak Socialist Youth Union, which established here Klub mladých in the early 1970s.

In 1973 the Atlas Club was founded under the banner of Socialist Youth Union (SZM). The premises were renovated, toilets were added. The club's narrow and also long concert hall had a capacity of about 50 people, there was a bar, tables with chairs near the pillars and a dance floor. Poetry, prose, theatre, photography, visual arts, and especially music were presented here.

The first concert in the Atlas klub was held in 1975. The club was a rehearsal and concert hall for musicians, works of art were exhibited here by artists banned by the socialist regime, a carnival was held here every year and there was a notice board with upcoming events. The idea to organize a Koncert mladosti festival at the amphitheater in Pezinok was also born here.

The Atlas klub chairman was Pepo Šimurda, later Marián Ištvánfi. In 1976, Ladislav Kanka was the incumbent chairman. In the late 1970s, Ludek Štědronský became the chairman and later Vladimír "Jimmi" Švarc. In the 1980s he was replaced by the last chairman Vladimír "Vlado" Raždík. During Raždík's leadership, the Atlas klub served mainly for discos of regional disc jockeys, such as Ladislav "Laco" Gavorník, Milan Ides, and Dušan Dobrovoda. The entrance fee to the discotheques cost 2 Kčs and were held from 8 pm to 10 or 11 pm. The hall was later emptied by members of Public Security. The drinks that the then local youth liked to drink in the club were wine, Pepsi Cola, and Mirinda. Except for mandatory participation at the Labour Day annual celebrations on the stage in front of the Hotel Grand on Leningrad Square (Slovak: Leningradské námestie, current Town Hall Square), the club was not politically involved at all.

In the early 1990s it was closed together with the outdoor swimming pool, and after the swimming pool fell to the state in 1996 it was demolished. The building where the club was located was demolished between 2006 and 2008.

== Sources ==
- "Atlas klub Pezinok – Srdce Pezinka, združenie". www.srdcepezinka.sk.
- "Spomienka na bývalé kúpalisko". Pezinčan. July 2013. Archived from the original on 2 August 2022.
- Kotes, Dominik (15 November 2023). "Rebeli s ľadovou vodou a vínom". Webjournal 2.0 (in Slovak).
