= Peter Bittner =

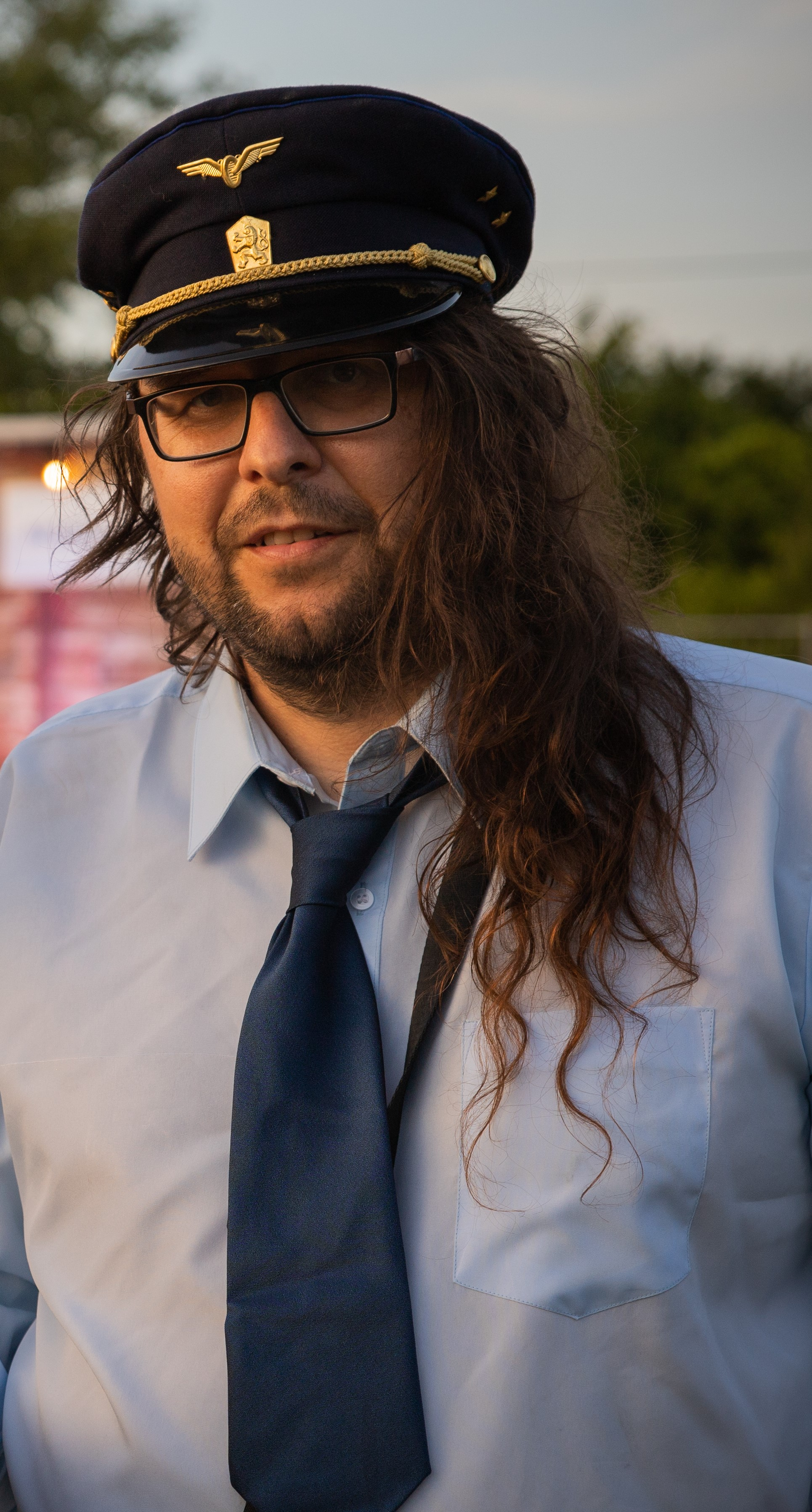
- Bittner in 2022

Background information
- Also known as: Petter Bittner
- Born: 4 March 1976 (age 50); Czechoslovakia
- Genres: crossover, alternative, instrumental
- Occupations: drummer, manager, music producer, event manager
- Instruments: drum kit
- Works: Modranská železnica, Drumfest Slovakia, P.R.D., Fíha tralala, TV Pezinok, Filmission, Cibulák, Hodokvas festival, Alternatíva v Drevone
- Years active: 2001–present
- Member of: Feelme
- Formerly of: Sunday Afternoon Trio, 7th Size, Temo/Beattner, Diadem, Introvarts, Casabeattner, Demented, Big Bastard Band of Bratislava, Musicmania
- Spouse: Silvia Bittner Fialová (m. 2016)

Peter Bittner (born 4 March 1976), better known as Petter Bittner, is a Slovak drummer, manager, music producer and cultural event manager.

== Biography ==
Bittner was born on 4 March 1976. He comes from Pezinok. He attended a primary school in this town and grew up in the sídlisko on Moyzesova Street. At the age of twelve, local metalhead Tóno Roman introduced him to listening to heavy metal music. In 1999, Bittner got an idea for a new band and since January 2002 started playing with guitarist Tomáš, later with Tomáš's brother Laco, who played bass guitar, and then a crossover-instrumental band called Feelme was formed. The band is playing movie themes in a hard rock arrangement and continued its active activities, always with new musicians. The band consisted of Ján "Johny" Štefeček, Stanislav "Stanley" Kovár, Richard "Soso" Molnár, Peťo Škreňo, Viktor Hidvéghy, Matúš Moško and Barbora Comendant. Its current members are guitarist Lukáš Komenda and bass guitarist Miki Michelčík. In the past he was a member of Slovak bands, such as 7th Size, Temo/Beattner, Diadem and Introvarts.

Since 2002, he was also a long-time director of TV Pezinok, he is a member of Rada LOToS and the Workshop organizational team. In 2009, he won the Literary Fund Award for the author's idea in the advertising spot "Hydrant" and Annual Samuel Zoch Award. In 2012, he won the Literary Fund Award for directing the commercial "Elegán". He was also the co-author of several other winning spots.

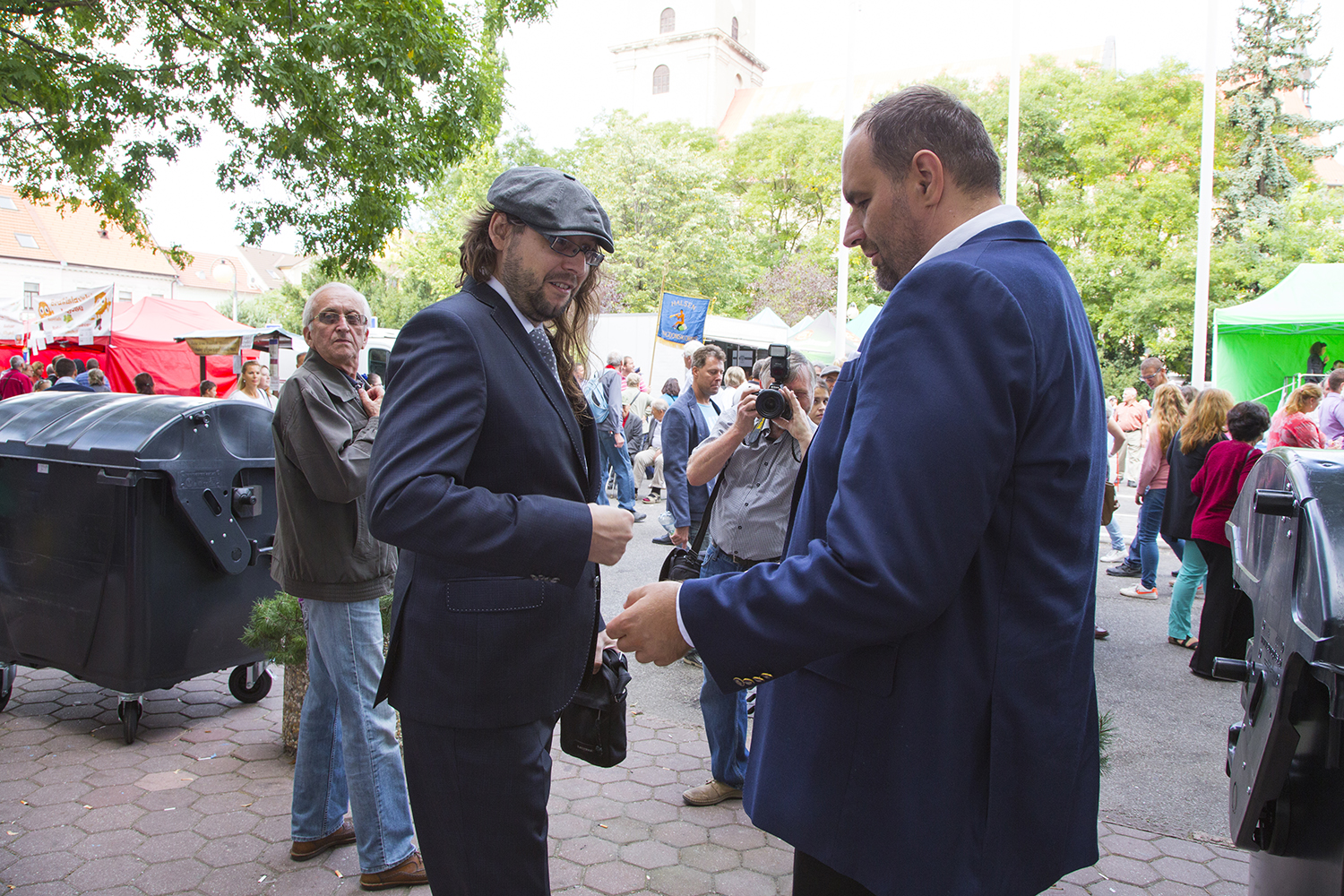
Peter Bittner with Pavol Frešo in September 2016

From 2010 to 2016, he was the stage manager of the Grape festival and in January 2013, together with keyboardist Juraj Hanulík, he founded the music project Filmission. In February 2015, he and Bloom band singer Barbora Drahovská became godparents of the debut album by Alalya band from Nitra.

He is a member of a civic association called Pezinské rozprávkové divadlo (P.R.D.), which participated in the organization of the Cibulák, the Hodokvas festival, the Etnofestival, the Koncert mladosti po 30 rokoch, the Alternatíva v Drevone and the 6-hour commemorative event, Koncert mladosti 40. Currently, the civic association participates in the organization of the Drumfest Slovakia festival. Bittner is also the manager of Martina Jelenová's project called Fíha tralala.

In 2021, he invented a new community space, Modranská železnica, out of the recession which was ceremonially put into operation on 30 April 2022.

He currently lives in Modra.

== Personal life ==
He has a younger brother Marek (born 1977). Since 19 March 2016, he has been married to Silvia Fialová and they have a daughter, Kornélia.

== Discography ==
=== Diadem ===
- "Informer" (single, 2002)

=== Feelme ===
- 21st CENTURY SONGS (live promo CD, 2004)
- "pf (pulp fiction)" (promo CD-single, 2005)

== Works ==
- Boriš, Pavol and Bittner, Peter (2001). Pezinok – bigbeatown. 1. ed. Renesans. ISBN 80-968427-2-2.
- Boriš, Pavol; Štrba, Ján and Bittner, Peter (2007). Koncerty mladosti ´76, ´77 – Československý Woodstock.
- Štrba, Ján and Bittner, Petter (2021). Pezinok – Musictown.
- Boriš, Pavol; Štrba, Ján and Bittner, Peter (2024). Pezinok – bigbeatown. 2. ed.
