= Martina Šimkovičová =

Slovak politician (born 1971)

- Šimkovičová in 2025

Deputy Prime Minister of Slovakia
- Incumbent
- Assumed office 21 October 2026 Serving with Robert Kaliňák and Denisa Saková
- Prime Minister: Robert Fico

Minister of Culture
- Incumbent
- Assumed office 25 October 2023
- Prime Minister: Robert Fico
- Preceded by: Silvia Hroncová

Member of the National Council
- In office 23 March 2016 – 20 March 2020

Personal details
- Born: Martina Bučuričová; 29 August 1971 (age 55) Modra, Czechoslovakia
- Party: Slovak National Party (2023–present); Voice of the People (2018–2021); We Are Family (2015–2016)
- Spouse: Igor Šimkovič (m. 2005; div. 2019)
- Children: 3

Martina Šimkovičová (née Bučuričová; born 29 August 1971) is a Slovak television presenter and politician. From 2016 to 2020, she served as a member of the National Council. Since October 2023, Šimkovičová has been serving as Minister of Culture and since October 2026 as Deputy Prime Minister of Slovakia in the Fourth cabinet of Robert Fico.

== Early life ==
Šimkovičová was born on 29 August 1971 in Modra as the youngest of three sisters. She wanted to study acting but missed entrance exams and ended up studying special pedagogy at the Comenius University instead.

== TV career (1998–2015) ==
Initially, Šimkovičová started her TV career with Markíza TV channel in 1998 as an early morning show host and sports anchor. Between 2004 and 2005, she won the OTO Awards in the Sports presenter category.

In 2006, Šimkovičová switched to presenting the main news program, where she formed a pair with Patrik Švajda. Later, Šimkovičová was again awarded the OTO Award prize, this time in the News presenter category. In 2010, she competed in Let's Dance, the Slovak version of television franchise Dancing with the Stars. Following the birth of her third child in 2013, she took a break in her television career to focus on raising her family.

Šimkovičová briefly returned to Markíza in February 2015 as a host of a celebrity gossip show, Reflex Špeciál. In summer 2015, she was fired from Markíza for posting hateful content about Syrian war refugees on her Facebook page.

Following her dismissal, previously apolitical Šimkovičová established herself as a star of the far-right media, particularly by posting xenophobic, anti-vax, homophobic, and pro-Russian content on Facebook. She was the main face of the unsuccessful attempt to launch a new television far-right TV channel INTV. In 2018, she was nominated for the Homophobe of the year award by the Institute for Human Rights for regular Facebook posts promoting hate against the LGBT community. In 2021, she became the host at the newly founded internet television Slovan.

== Political career ==
=== Member of Parliament (2016–2020) ===
In the 2016 Slovak parliamentary election, Šimkovičová was elected to the parliament for the We Are Family political party. However, soon after the election, she was expelled from the party for casting a parliamentary vote for herself as well as for her fellow We Are Family MP Rastislav Holúbek. Following the incident, Šimkovičová was fined €1,000 for breaching the code of conduct of the parliament, but refused to resign and served the rest of the term as an independent MP.

In the 2020 Slovak parliamentary election, Šimkovičová led the list of the Voice of the People party, which received less than 2,000 votes, far below the representation threshold.

In the 2023 Slovak parliamentary election, Šimkovičová successfully ran on the list of the Slovak National Party (SNS). Šimkovičová claimed she picked the SNS because it allowed "independent personalities" to run on its list. Following the forming of a government coalition including SNS, the party chairman Andrej Danko announced Šimkovičová's nomination for the position of Minister of Culture.

=== Minister of Culture (2023–present) ===
As a minister, Šimkovičová has maintained a tense relationship with media and cultural institutions. Immediately after taking office, she stopped all funding for countering disinformation, while maintaining her YouTube broadcast with the MP Peter Kotlár, which regularly airs far right talking points as well as conspiracy theories. In particular, her claim in an interview that LGBT rights was leading to the "extinction of the white race" led to a widespread criticism. She has also been a subject of public ridicule for her open letter to the Czech Minister of Culture, which she published on her Facebook page as it contained numerous grammatical and spelling errors. She also immediately restored cultural cooperation with Russia and Belarus placed on hold after the Russian invasion of Ukraine.

In March 2024, Šimkovičová replaced the directors of Slovak National Library and the Bibiana, the International House of Art for Children. The new managers were picked without a transparent selection process. The new director of Bibiana, Petra Flach, was found to be a neighbor of Šimkovičová with no previous experience in the cultural sphere.

Her policy regarding Slovakia's public broadcasting causes the Slovak Television and Radio to have to give equal representation to theories like Flat Earth, which was justified by her chief of staff Lukáš Machala as it had "not been proved that the Earth is round".

Pundits and opposition politicians routinely refer to Šimkovičová "minister of non-culture" The opposition unsuccessfully filed a Motion of no confidence against Šimkovičová in February 2024 following an online petition demanding her sacking signed by almost 190,000 people.

==== Dismissal of leadership of flagship cultural institutions ====
Over the summer 2024 Šimkovičová sacked the directors of Slovak National Theatre and Slovak National Gallery without providing any justification. In response, another online petition, organized by actors Zuzana Fialová and Richard Stanke, cartoonist Martin Šútovec, and writer Michal Hvorecký, gathered over 180,000 signatures again called for sacking of Šimkovičová. A protest in Bratislava attended by over 10,000 people was organized to support the demands of the petition. Former ministers of culture across the political spectrum Ladislav Snopko, Milan Kňažko, Rudolf Chmel, Marek Maďarič, and Silvia Hroncová published an open letter in support of the demands of the petition. The parliamentary opposition announced the filling of another motion of no confidence against Šimkovičová and called for more street protests against the "destruction of Slovak culture".

== Personal life ==
Šimkovičová has been married twice with one daughter from her first marriage. From 2005 to 2019, she was married to car racer Igor Šimkovič. They have two children together.

While married to Šimkovič, the family lived in the Austrian village of Prellenkirchen. After divorce she moved to the nearby town of Kittsee. After becoming the minister of culture, her residence in Austria became a subject of controversy because members of government are required to reside in Slovakia according to the Constitution of Slovakia. Pundits and activists also criticized Šimkovičová for promoting "pure Slovak culture" and opposing LGBT rights while choosing to base her family in a foreign country, where the LGBT community enjoys more rights than in Slovakia. In August 2024 Šimkovičová announced she was "forced to leave her home in Austria and seek a new home in Slovakia" because of bullying activists who organized protests in Kittsee.
