= 14968 Kubáček =

Main-belt asteroid

Discovery
- Discovered by: A. Galád; A. Pravda
- Discovery site: Modra Obs.
- Discovery date: 23 August 1997

Designations
- Named after: Dalibor Kubáček (Slovak astronomer)
- Alternative designations: 1997 QG · 1987 DG_{3} 1998 XT_{89}
- Minor planet category: main-belt · (middle) background

Orbital characteristics
- Epoch 4 September 2017 (JD 2458000.5)
- Uncertainty parameter 0
- Observation arc: 29.29 yr (10,698 days)
- Aphelion: 2.8129 AU
- Perihelion: 2.3186 AU
- Semi-major axis: 2.5658 AU
- Eccentricity: 0.0963
- Orbital period (sidereal): 4.11 yr (1,501 days)
- Mean anomaly: 201.00°
- Mean motion: 0° 14^{m} 23.28^{s} / day
- Inclination: 5.4432°
- Longitude of ascending node: 150.32°
- Argument of perihelion: 296.81°

Physical characteristics
- Dimensions: 4.71 km (calculated); 4.81±0.23 km
- Synodic rotation period: 4.89±0.01 h
- Geometric albedo: 0.20 (assumed); 0.210±0.046
- Spectral type: S
- Absolute magnitude (H): 13.90 · 14.0 · 14.20±0.12

14968 Kubáček (provisional designation 1997 QG) is a stony background asteroid from the middle region of the asteroid belt, approximately 5 kilometers in diameter. The asteroid was discovered on 23 August 1997, by Slovak astronomers Adrián Galád and Alexander Pravda at Modra Observatory, Slovakia. It was named for Slovak astronomer Dalibor Kubáček.

== Orbit and classification ==
Kubáček orbits the Sun in the central main-belt at a distance of 2.3–2.8 AU once every 4 years and 1 month (1,501 days). Its orbit has an eccentricity of 0.10 and an inclination of 5° with respect to the ecliptic.

Its observation arc begins 10 years prior to its official discovery observation, with its identification as 1987 DG_{3} at the French Caussols Observatory in February 1987.

== Physical characteristics ==
=== Rotation period ===
A rotational lightcurve of Kubáček was obtained from photometric observations made by the discovering astronomer Adrián Galád at Modra Observatory in April 2008. The lightcurve showed a rotation period of 4.89 hours with a brightness variation of 0.48 in magnitude (U=3-).

=== Diameter and albedo ===
According to the survey carried out by NASA's space-based Wide-field Infrared Survey Explorer with its subsequent NEOWISE mission, Kubáček measures 4.8 kilometers in diameter and its surface has an albedo of 0.21, while the Collaborative Asteroid Lightcurve Link assumes a standard albedo for stony asteroids of 0.20 and calculates a diameter of 4.7 kilometers.

== Naming ==
This minor planet was named in honor of astronomer Dalibor Kubáček (born 1957), who explored the coma of comets at the Slovak Academy of Sciences in Bratislava. He readily instructed the peculiar methods of image processing to students and friends, as well as to the discoverers of this minor planet. The official naming citation was published by the Minor Planet Center on 27 April 2002 (M.P.C. 45339).
