= Juraj Tóth =

Slovak astronomer

- Born: March 28, 1975 (age 51); Bratislava, Czechoslovakia (now Slovakia)
- Education: Comenius University
- Known for: Discovery of minor planets
- Scientific career
- Fields: Astronomy
- Workplaces: Comenius University

Minor planets discovered: 16
| (20664) 1999 UV_{4} | October 31, 1999 | ^{[A]} list |
| 21802 Svoreň | October 6, 1999 | ^{[B]} list |
| 29824 Kalmančok | February 23, 1999 | ^{[B]} list |
| (59378) 1999 FV_{3} | March 19, 1999 | ^{[A]} list |
| 59389 Oskarvonmiller | March 24, 1999 | ^{[B]} list |
| (59415) 1999 GJ | April 4, 1999 | ^{[A]} list |
| (60009) 1999 TL_{17} | October 15, 1999 | ^{[A]} list |
| (67019) 1999 XF_{137} | December 13, 1999 | ^{[B]} list |
| (91156) 1998 QS_{60} | August 31, 1998 | ^{[A]} list |
| (102532) 1999 UU_{4} | October 31, 1999 | ^{[A]} list |
| (102626) 1999 VY_{27} | November 15, 1999 | ^{[B]} list |
| (118366) 1999 GK | April 5, 1999 | ^{[C]} list |
| (121336) 1999 TF_{6} | October 6, 1999 | ^{[B]} list |
| (125372) 2001 VE_{72} | November 15, 2001 | ^{[B]} list |
| (216524) 2001 HM_{20} | April 27, 2001 | ^{[A]} list |
| (219090) 1998 RA | September 1, 1998 | ^{[A]} list |
Co-discoverers:^{A} with A. Galád^{B} with L. Kornoš^{C} with D. Kalmančok

Juraj Tóth (born 28 March 1975) is a Slovak astronomer, discoverer of minor planets, and professor of astronomy at Comenius University in Bratislava, Slovakia.

An expert in meteoroid fragmentation, he is known for his observations of the 1998 Leonid meteor shower from Modra Observatory, which were later published in the journal Earth, Moon, and Planets. His photograph of the Leonid meteor shower was credited by NASA.

Tóth is a member of the International Astronomical Union and currently a professor at Comenius University in the department of astronomy. He is credited by the Minor Planet Center with the discovery and co-discovery of 16 numbered minor planets between 1998 and 2001.

He has published in numerous journals on astronomy, mainly on meteoroids. His work, Orbital Evolution of Příbram and Neuschwanstein, has been shown in the Smithsonian Astrophysical Observatory. In 2010, he led a field expedition, which found the first piece of the "Košice" meteorite fall. Košice is the 14th meteorite in the world with a pedigree.

He is married and has three children.

The main-belt asteroid 24976 Jurajtoth, discovered by LONEOS in 1998, was named in his honor.

== Publications ==
- Porubčan, V., Tóth, J., Yano, H.: On fragmentation of meteoroids in interplanetary space, Contrib. Astron. Obs. Skalnaté Pleso, 32, 132 - 144. (2002)
- Vereš, P.; Kornos, L.; Tóth, J.: Search for very close approaching NEAs, Contrib. Astron. Obs. Skalnat´e Pleso 36, 171 – 180, (2006)
- Vereš, P.; Klačka, J.; Kómar1, L.; Tóth, J.: Motion of a Meteoroid Released from an Asteroid , Earth, Moon, and Planets v.102:1-4, p. 47-51. (June, 2008)
- Tóth, J.; Kornos, L.; Porubčan, V.: Photographic Leonids 1998 Observed at Modra Observatory, Earth, Moon, and Planets v.82-83:0, 285-294.
- Kornoš, L.; Tóth, J.; Vereš, P.: Orbital Evolution of Příbram and Neuschwanstein, Earth, Moon, and Planets, v.102:1-4, 59-65
