= Ján Štrba =

Slovak photographer

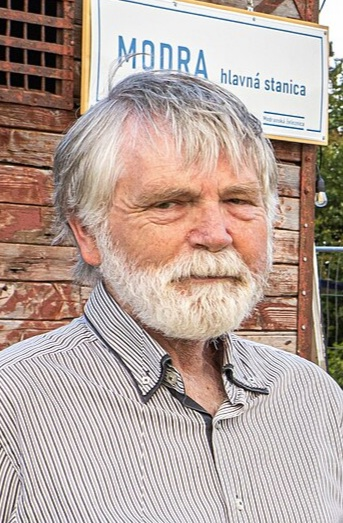
- Ján Štrba in 2023
- Born: 3 June 1952 (age 74); Slovenský Grob, Czechoslovakia
- Other name: Žárofka
- Education: Faculty of Mechanical Engineering, SVŠT
- Occupations: Photographer, technician
- Years active: 1974–present
- Known for: Koncert mladosti

Ján Štrba (born 3 June 1952) is a Slovak photographer.

== Biography ==
Štrba was born in Slovenský Grob, Czechoslovakia. He graduated at the Secondary Industrial School of Electrical Engineering in Bratislava.

He met Paľo Boriš in the early 1970s, when he was traveling on a train with a large reel-to-reel tape recorder, and they became friends. In 1974, Štrba started to take photographs. That same year, the Fermata band concert in Trnava was the first concert where he took photographs. In 1981, he graduated with the master's degree in production machinery and equipment study field at the Faculty of Mechanical Engineering, SVŠT in Bratislava. Since 1983, he has been living in Pezinok and worked most of his life as technician at the Faculty of Pharmacy, Comenius University in Bratislava.

He was a member of several Slovak photography clubs – FO III Bratislava, Q Klub Bratislava, Fotoskupina Oči Žilina, Pefos Pezinok.

He published two monographs, Taký vzdialený deň (2002) and Návrat (ne)strateného času (2012), and photopublication Pezinok 1208 – 2008. In the meantime, several books have been published with his photographs of musicians and concerts, e.g. feelings from Koncert mladosti festival at the Amphitheater Pezinok which were part of various commemorative exhibitions and books.

Together with Peter Bittner, he is an author of Pezinok – Musictown book from 2021 and together with Bittner and Boriš, he became co-author of Pezinok – bigbeatown second edition in 2024.

He is married to his wife Ľudmila and their son is Matej.
