= 12482 Pajka =

Background asteroid from the inner regions of the asteroid belt

Discovery
- Discovered by: A. Galád; A. Pravda
- Discovery site: Modra Obs.
- Discovery date: 23 March 1997

Designations
- Named after: Paula Pravdová (discoverer's daughter)
- Alternative designations: 1997 FG_{1}
- Minor planet category: main-belt · (inner) background

Orbital characteristics
- Epoch 4 September 2017 (JD 2458000.5)
- Uncertainty parameter 0
- Observation arc: 24.77 yr (9,048 days)
- Aphelion: 2.8060 AU
- Perihelion: 2.0264 AU
- Semi-major axis: 2.4162 AU
- Eccentricity: 0.1613
- Orbital period (sidereal): 3.76 yr (1,372 days)
- Mean anomaly: 166.06°
- Mean motion: 0° 15^{m} 44.64^{s} / day
- Inclination: 8.6213°
- Longitude of ascending node: 133.39°
- Argument of perihelion: 30.048°

Physical characteristics
- Mean diameter: 4.30 km (calculated)
- Synodic rotation period: 3.9428±0.0001 h
- Geometric albedo: 0.20 (assumed)
- Spectral type: S (assumed)
- Absolute magnitude (H): 13.99±0.21; 14.2

12482 Pajka, provisional designation 1997 FG_{1}, is a background asteroid from the inner regions of the asteroid belt, approximately 4.3 kilometers in diameter. It was discovered by Slovak astronomers Adrián Galád and Alexander Pravda at Modra Observatory on 23 March 1997. It was named after Paula Pravdová ("Pajka"), the daughter of the second discoverer.

== Orbit and classification ==
Pajka is a non-family asteroid from the main belt's background population. It orbits the Sun in the inner asteroid belt at a distance of 2.0–2.8 AU once every 3 years and 9 months (1,372 days). Its orbit has an eccentricity of 0.16 and an inclination of 9° with respect to the ecliptic.

The body's observation arc begins 6 years prior to its official discovery observation, with a precovery taken at Steward Observatory (Kitt Peak–Spacewatch) in October 1991.

== Naming ==
This minor planet was named after Paula Pravdová (born 1990), whose familiar name is "Pajka". She is the daughter of the discovering astronomer Alexander Pravda and often visited Modra Observatory. The official naming citation was published by the Minor Planet Center on 28 March 2002 (M.P.C. 45234).

== Physical characteristics ==
A rotational lightcurve of Pajka was obtained from photometric observations made by the discovering astronomer at Modra Observatory in January 2008. The lightcurve showed a rotation period of 3.9428 hours with a brightness amplitude of 0.21 in magnitude (U=3-). The Collaborative Asteroid Lightcurve Link assumes a standard albedo for stony asteroids of 0.20 and calculates a diameter of 4.3 kilometers with an absolute magnitude of 14.2.
