= Leninist Youth Union =

The Leninist Youth Union (Czech: Leninský svaz mladých, abbreviated LSM, Slovak: Leninský zväz mladých, abbreviated LZM), initially known as the Youth Union, was a youth organization in Czechoslovakia. It was founded at a meeting held at Hotel Tichý in Prague on March 7, 1969, by district organizations of the now defunct Czechoslovak Youth Union their reaffirming adherence to Marxist-Leninist political line. The formation of the organization followed a call from the Communist Party of Czechoslovakia to rebuild the youth movement and was engineered by Josef Jodas, his daughter Hana playing a key role in it. The name 'Leninist Youth Union' was adopted in September 1969. The organization gathered 11,402 members at its peak. The organization had a counterpart in Slovakia, the Leninist Youth Union in Slovakia, between September 1969 and March 1970. The Slovak Leninist Youth Union Central Committee held its last meeting on April 23, 1970.

The Central Committee Leninist Youth Union held its last meeting on September 11, 1970, and decided to disband the organization by September 30, 1970. The Socialist Youth Union was formed as a new youth organization.
