= Dušan Kalmančok =

Slovak astronomer (born 1945)

Minor planets discovered: 7
| 11118 Modra | August 9, 1996 | ^{[1]} | MPC |
| 15860 Siráň | April 20, 1996 | ^{[1]} | MPC |
| 24194 Paľuš | December 8, 1999 | ^{[1]} | MPC |
| 38238 Holíč | July 18, 1999 | ^{[2]} | MPC |
| 48934 Kočanová | August 18, 1998 | ^{[3]} | MPC |
| 53910 Jánfischer | April 6, 2000 | ^{[4]} | MPC |
| (118366) 1999 GK | April 5, 1999 | ^{[5]} | MPC |
^{1} with A. Galád; ^{2} with Š. Gajdoš; ^{3} with A. Pravda; ^{4} with L. Kornoš; ^{5} with J. Tóth

Dušan Kalmančok (born 1945) is a Slovak astronomer and co-discoverer of minor planets.

He is credited by the Minor Planet Center with the discovery of 7 asteroids between 1996 and 2000, and significantly contributed to the establishment of the Modra Observatory, Slovakia, in 1988. Kalmančok has also been involved in elaborating its observational programs to study the Sun and interplanetary matter.

The outer main-belt asteroid 29824 Kalmančok, discovered by astronomers Leonard Kornoš and Juraj Tóth at Modra, was named in his honor on 7 April 2005 (M.P.C. 53954).
