= Adrián Galád =

Slovak astronomer

Minor planets discovered: 80
see § List of discovered minor planets

Adrián Galád (born 1970) is a Slovak astronomer and a discoverer of minor planets.

He is credited by the Minor Planet Center with the discovery and co-discovery of 81 numbered minor planets between 1995 and 2009, most of them in collaboration with astronomers Dušan Kalmančok, Alexander Pravda, Juraj Tóth, Leonard Kornoš, Peter Kolény and Štefan Gajdoš.

The asteroid 32008 Adriángalád, a binary asteroid discovered by LINEAR, was named after him in 2016.

== List of discovered minor planets ==
11118 Modra	9 August 1996	list^{[A]}
11614 Istropolitana	14 January 1996	list^{[B]}
11636 Pezinok	27 December 1996	list^{[B]}
11657 Antonhajduk	5 March 1997	list^{[B]}
12482 Pajka	23 March 1997	list^{[B]}
13154 Petermrva	7 September 1995	list^{[B]}
14040 Andrejka	23 August 1995	list^{[B]}
14098 Šimek	24 August 1997	list^{[B]}
14509 Lučenec	9 March 1996	list^{[B]}
14968 Kubáček	23 August 1997	list^{[B]}
15860 Siráň	20 April 1996	list^{[A]}
15946 Satinský	8 January 1998	list^{[B]}
16869 Košinár	10 January 1998	list^{[B]}
20180 Annakolény	27 December 1996	list^{[B]}
20664 Senec	31 October 1999	list^{[C]}
22429 Jurašek	22 February 1996	list^{[B]}
22440 Bangsgaard	17 May 1996	list^{[B]}
24194 Paľuš	8 December 1999	list^{[A]}
24949 Klačka	4 August 1997	list^{[B]}
24959 Zielenbach	3 October 1997	list^{[B]}
27896 Tourminator	13 July 1996	list^{[B]}
(28753) 2000 HA	18 April 2000	list^{[D]}
29650 Toldy	23 November 1998	list^{[E]}
31234 Bea	7 February 1998	list^{[B]}
33137 Strejček	20 February 1998	list^{[B]}

33175 Isabellegleeson	22 March 1998	list^{[B]}
35621 Lorius	15 May 1998	list^{[B]}
(39892) 1998 FQ_{5}	23 March 1998	list^{[B]}
42849 Podjavorinská	15 September 1999	list^{[E]}
(43994) 1997 PF_{3}	11 August 1997	list^{[B]}
(55900) 1998 CQ	3 February 1998	list^{[B]}
(58713) 1998 DS	19 February 1998	list^{[B]}
(59378) 1999 FV_{3}	19 March 1999	list^{[C]}
(59415) 1999 GJ	4 April 1999	list^{[C]}
(60009) 1999 TL_{17}	15 October 1999	list^{[C]}
60972 Matenko	23 May 2000	list^{[E]}
(65851) 1997 EM_{2}	4 March 1997	list^{[B]}
66669 Aradac	12 October 1999	list^{[E]}
71282 Holuby	6 January 2000	list^{[E]}
(74826) 1999 TN_{17}	13 October 1999	list^{[E]}
(80009) 1999 GD_{2}	8 April 1999	list^{[D]}
(85494) 1997 TS	4 October 1997	list^{[B]}
(85575) 1998 DC_{1}	19 February 1998	list^{[B]}
(85577) 1998 DC_{2}	21 February 1998	list^{[B]}
(90996) 1998 AQ_{7}	8 January 1998	list^{[B]}
(91011) 1998 CH_{2}	8 February 1998	list^{[B]}
(91156) 1998 QS_{60}	31 August 1998	list^{[C]}
(91602) 1999 TM_{17}	13 October 1999	list^{[E]}
(96392) 1998 DH	17 February 1998	list^{[B]}
(99912) 1995 UY_{44}	31 October 1995	list^{[B]}

(100521) 1997 BX_{5}	26 January 1997	list^{[B]}
(100595) 1997 PA_{2}	4 August 1997	list^{[B]}
(100603) 1997 RN_{9}	15 September 1997	list^{[B]}
(100707) 1998 BW_{14}	25 January 1998	list
(100737) 1998 DR_{9}	23 February 1998	list^{[B]}
(101966) 1999 RO_{43}	14 September 1999	list^{[E]}
(102532) 1999 UU_{4}	31 October 1999	list^{[C]}
(120683) 1997 CJ_{6}	6 February 1997	list^{[B]}
123852 Jánboďa	15 February 2001	list^{[F]}
(134403) 1997 SC	16 September 1997	list^{[B]}
(136765) 1996 JA	5 May 1996	list^{[B]}
(136822) 1997 PW_{4}	10 August 1997	list^{[B]}
(145770) 1997 TW_{24}	13 October 1997	list^{[B]}
(148021) 1998 CT	4 February 1998	list^{[B]}
(168398) 1998 DG	17 February 1998	list^{[B]}
(171619) 2000 CX_{2}	2 February 2000	list^{[E]}
(173177) 1997 SW_{4}	23 September 1997	list^{[E]}
(181783) 1998 BV_{14}	25 January 1998	list
(205022) 1998 AW_{4}	7 January 1998	list^{[B]}
(215113) 1998 DD_{2}	21 February 1998	list^{[B]}
(216524) 2001 HM_{20}	27 April 2001	list^{[C]}
(219090) 1998 RA	1 September 1998	list^{[C]}
(241590) 1998 BM_{4}	23 January 1998	list
(257514) 1997 CL_{4}	3 February 1997	list^{[B]}
(285116) 1995 SN_{1}	18 September 1995	list

(298963) 2004 VM_{15}	5 November 2004	list
(305582) 2008 YX_{44}	25 January 1998	list
(310390) 1998 HC_{2}	17 April 1998	list^{[B]}
(356985) 1997 SA	16 September 1997	list^{[B]}
(422656) 1998 DL	18 February 1998	list^{[B]}
(599192) 2009 TH	6 October 2009	list
Co-discovery made with:^{A} D. Kalmančok^{B} A. Pravda^{C} J. Tóth^{D} L. Kornoš^{E} P. Kolény^{F} Š. Gajdoš
