= 11118 Modra =

Main-belt Flora asteroid

Discovery
- Discovered by: A. Galád; D. Kalmančok
- Discovery site: Modra Obs.
- Discovery date: 9 August 1996

Designations
- Named after: Modra (town and observatory)
- Alternative designations: 1996 PK · 1991 FL_{1}
- Minor planet category: main-belt · Flora

Orbital characteristics
- Epoch 4 September 2017 (JD 2458000.5)
- Uncertainty parameter 0
- Observation arc: 25.44 yr (9,291 days)
- Aphelion: 2.5052 AU
- Perihelion: 2.1225 AU
- Semi-major axis: 2.3139 AU
- Eccentricity: 0.0827
- Orbital period (sidereal): 3.52 yr (1,286 days)
- Mean anomaly: 139.39°
- Mean motion: 0° 16^{m} 48^{s} / day
- Inclination: 3.0326°
- Longitude of ascending node: 7.4717°
- Argument of perihelion: 204.63°

Physical characteristics
- Dimensions: 3.74 km (calculated); 8.69±3.13 km
- Synodic rotation period: 27.12±0.02 h 27.1481±0.0409 h
- Geometric albedo: 0.054±0.105; 0.24 (assumed)
- Spectral type: S · C
- Absolute magnitude (H): 14.3 · 14.211±0.005 (R) · 14.17±0.36 · 14.10

11118 Modra (provisional designation 1996 PK) is a Flora asteroid of uncertain composition from the inner regions of the asteroid belt, approximately 5 kilometers in diameter.

It was discovered on 9 August 1996, by Slovak astronomers Adrián Galád and Dušan Kalmančok at the Modra Observatory in Slovakia, and named for the town Modra where the discovering observatory is located.

== Classification and orbit ==
Modra is a member of the Flora family, one of the largest families of stony asteroids. It orbits the Sun in the inner main-belt at a distance of 2.1–2.5 AU once every 3 years and 6 months (1,286 days). Its orbit has an eccentricity of 0.08 and an inclination of 3° with respect to the ecliptic. A first precovery was taken at ESO's La Silla Observatory in 1991, extending the asteroid's observation arc by 5 years prior to its discovery.

== Rotation period ==
In September 2010, a photometric lightcurve analysis of Modra by American astronomer Brian Warner at his Palmer Divide Observatory, Colorado, rendered an unambiguous period of 27.12±0.02 hours with a brightness variation of 0.53 in magnitude (U=3). A second lightcurve obtained during the wide-field survey at the U.S. Palomar Transient Factory in August 2010, and gave a period of 27.1481±0.0409 hours with an amplitude of 0.42 (U=2).

== Diameter and albedo ==
According to the survey carried out by NASA's Wide-field Infrared Survey Explorer and its subsequent NEOWISE mission, the asteroid has a low albedo of 0.05. In agreement, the large-scale survey by Pan-STARRS (PS1) rates it as a dark carbonaceous body. However, the Collaborative Asteroid Lightcurve Link (CALL) assumes a much higher albedo of 0.24 – derived from 8 Flora, the orbital family's largest member and namesake – and groups it to the S-type asteroid. The different albedos of the two spectral classes also translate into divergent estimates for the body's diameter. While CALL calculates 3.7 kilometers, NASA's space-based survey inferred a much larger diameter of 8.7 kilometers.

== Naming ==
This minor planet was named after both the small historical town of Modra, located in the Bratislava Region of Slovakia, and the Modra Observatory of the Institute of Astronomy at Comenius University, where this asteroid had been discovered. The approved naming citation was published by the Minor Planet Center on 28 September 1999 (M.P.C. 36130).
