= Silvia Hroncová =

Slovak manager

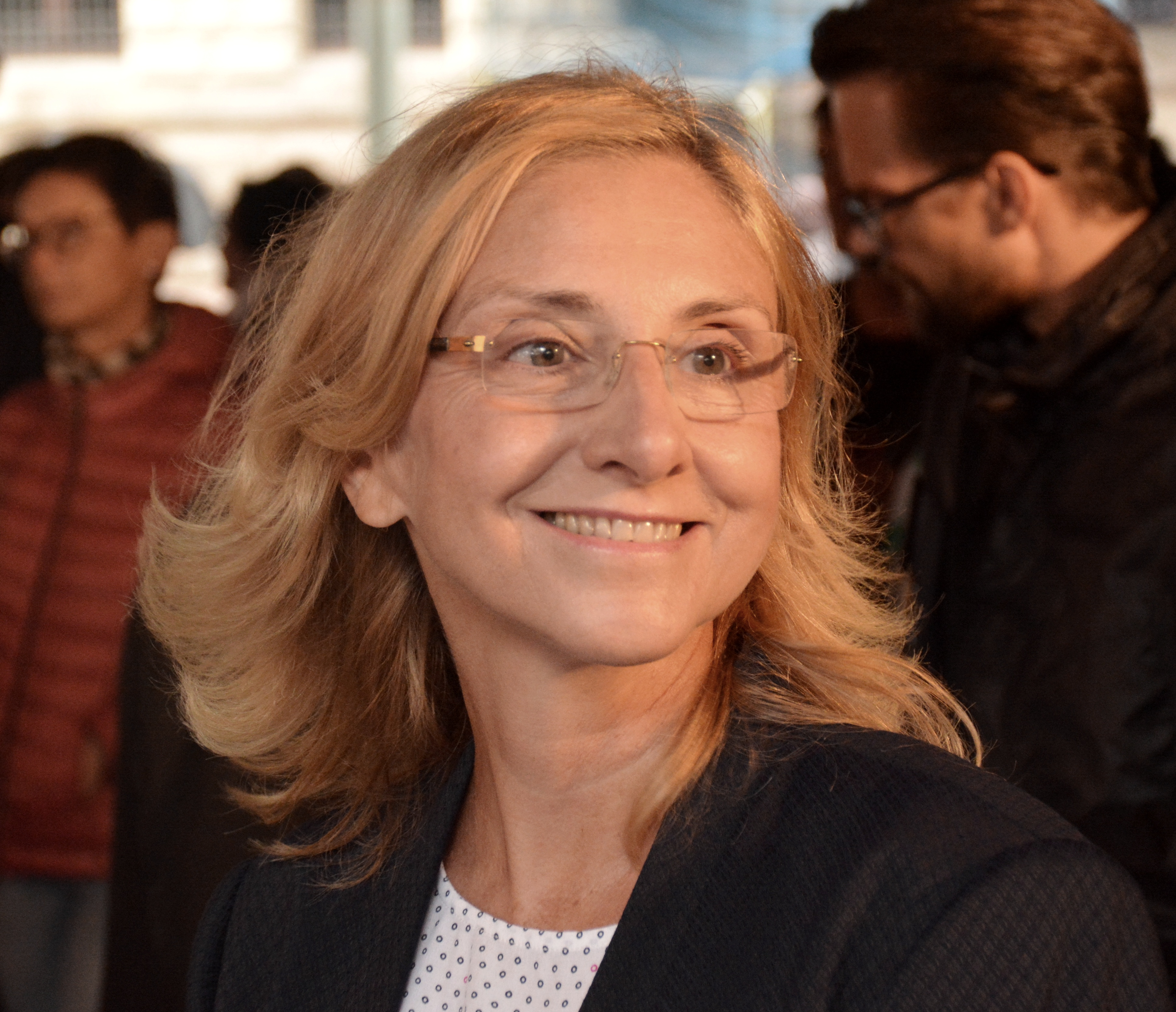
- Silvia Hroncová

Minister of Culture
- In office 15 May 2023 – 25 October 2023
- Prime Minister: Ľudovít Ódor
- Preceded by: Natália Milanová
- Succeeded by: Martina Šimkovičová

Personal details
- Born: Silvia Baránová; 22 July 1964 (age 61) Bratislava, Czechoslovakia

Silvia Hroncová (born 22 July 1964) is a Slovak manager and publisher. From May to October 2023 she served as the minister of culture of Slovakia.

== Biography ==
Hroncová, née Baránová was born on 22 July 1964 in Bratislava. She studied theatre and philosophy at the Academy of Performing Arts in Bratislava and Comenius University.

Following her graduation, she worked at the Theatre Institute in Bratislava. From 1999 to 2006 she was its director. Additionally, she was the editor of the Divadlo v medzičase journal, published from 1996 to 1998, which covered the theatre scene in Slovakia. Since 2002, she has been a member of the editorial board of a Czech theatre magazine Svět a divadlo.

From 2009 and 2013 and again from 2018 to 2023 she was the content director of Film Europe Media Company SK & CZ, which airs European films in the Czech Republic and Slovakia and operates a Film Europe cinema in the Pistori Palace in Bratislava as well as the Edison Film Hubs in Prague and Bratislava.

From 2006 to 2009 she was the director of Slovak National Theatre (SND). During her tenure the new SND building was opened. From 2013 to 2023 she was the Opera Director of the Czech National Theatre.

On 14 May 2023, President Zuzana Čaputová installed Hroncová as the minister of culture in her technocratic government.
