= Youth organizations in Communist Czechoslovakia =

After the 1948 takeover of power, the Communist Party of Czechoslovakia ("KSČ") formed two Soviet-style youth organizations: the Pionýr (Pioneers, for youngsters eight to fifteen years old) and the Czechoslovak Union of Youth (ČSM, ages fifteen to twenty-five). Both organizations were geared toward grooming their members (or a fortunate fraction of them) for KSČ membership.

By the late 1960s, some 70% of all those eligible were members of the Pionýr; the reform movement revealed, however, a number of points of dissatisfaction. Czechoslovak adherence to the Soviet model extended to uniform dress (white shirts and red kerchiefs) and salutes, neither of which was popular among Czechs and Slovaks. In addition, the Pioneer leadership was often less than devoted. In 1968, when the organization became voluntary, the number of leaders dropped precipitously; the resulting shortage persisted through the 1980s.

The Czechoslovak Union of Youth had a tumultuous history during the late 1960s and 1970s. As a feeder organization for the KSČ, it faced many of the same problems the party faced in recruiting members. In the mid-1960s, less than half of all 15- to 25-year-olds were members; in the mid-1970s, fewer than one-third had joined. As in the case of the KSČ, those who joined tended to do so with their future careers in mind; secondary school and university students were overrepresented, while only a fraction of the eligible industrial and agricultural workers belonged. Furthermore, a single, centralized organization was simply an inadequate vehicle for the interests of such a diverse group. During the reform era, the Czechoslovak Union of Youth split into a number of independent associations, including the Union of High School Students and Apprentices, the Union of Working Youth, and the Union of University Students. It was not a development the party found suitable, and beginning in 1969 party leaders set about reconstituting a unified movement. During the same era, the 1968 invasion spawned a number of dissident youth organizations. In the early 1970s, these were all infiltrated and repressed by the KSČ, a policy that continued throughout the 1980s.

In 1970 the party organized the Czechoslovak Socialist Youth Union (SSM), and by mid-decade the skewed recruitment pattern of its predecessor, the Czechoslovak Union of Youth, which had recruited more students than workers, had reappeared. The recruitment effort had been more intense than ever. "I know of only two types of students at this institution," commented one teacher, "those who will not graduate and those who are members of the Czechoslovak Socialist Union of Youth." The nets had been cast so widely that, not surprisingly, some members were unenthusiastic. Throughout the 1970s, there were complaints about the organization's propensity to take any and all joiners (even "beatniks," one writer complained), the association's apolitical and recreational focus, and a membership bent more on securing admission to a university than learning "the principles of socialist patriotism."

In 1983 the Czechoslovak Socialist Union of Youth had a total membership of over 1.5 million. Twenty-five percent of the members were listed as workers, 3% as agricultural workers, and 72% as "others". Over the time the membership in Pionýr and SSM became more-less a formal duty; most of the members ignored actions organized by the Union and many local groups existed only on the paper.

There was also the Svazarm, a paramilitary, Scouting type organisations that readied Czechoslovak youths for military training. It was very similar to the Soviet Union's DOSAAF.

The communist takeover also affected independent youth organisations. In 1946 a newly formed international organisation Association Internationale des Etudiants en Sciences Economiques (AIESE) was first headquartered in Prague, but had to leave the country in order to stay politically neutral after the communists gained power. The organisation re-entered Czechoslovakia in 1966 and later became a member of the Socialistic Youth Union as an affiliated body of AIESEC.
