= Peter Kolény =

Slovak astronomer

Minor planets discovered: 35
see § List of discovered minor planets

Peter Kolény is a Slovak astronomer. He is a prolific discoverer of asteroids. As of January 2010, the IAU Minor Planet Center credits him with the discovery or codiscovery of 35 asteroids.

== List of discovered minor planets ==
10207 Comeniana	16 August 1997	list^{[A]}
13370 Júliusbreza	7 November 1998	list^{[A]}
15376 Marták	1 February 1997	list^{[A]}
22469 Poloniny	2 February 1997	list^{[A]}
22558 Mladen	22 April 1998	list^{[A]}
24862 Hromec	27 February 1996	list^{[A]}
24974 Macúch	21 April 1998	list^{[A]}
29650 Toldy	23 November 1998	list^{[B]}
33129 Ivankrasko	1 February 1998	list^{[A]}
33158 Rúfus	26 February 1998	list^{[A]}
39880 Dobšinský	15 March 1998	list^{[A]}
42849 Podjavorinská	15 September 1999	list^{[B]}
(43925) 1996 DB_{3}	27 February 1996	list^{[A]}
(48729) 1997 AG_{22}	14 January 1997	list^{[A]}
(58819) 1998 HF_{3}	21 April 1998	list^{[A]}

60972 Matenko	23 May 2000	list^{[B]}
66669 Aradac	12 October 1999	list^{[B]}
(69461) 1996 UA_{3}	24 October 1996	list^{[A]}
71282 Holuby	6 January 2000	list^{[B]}
(73974) 1998 BT_{26}	29 January 1998	list^{[A]}
(74424) 1999 BN	17 January 1999	list^{[A]}
(74826) 1999 TN_{17}	13 October 1999	list^{[B]}
(79361) 1997 DA	16 February 1997	list^{[A]}
(91602) 1999 TM_{17}	13 October 1999	list^{[B]}
(96379) 1998 BH	18 January 1998	list^{[A]}
(100704) 1998 BG	17 January 1998	list^{[A]}
(101966) 1999 RO_{43}	14 September 1999	list^{[B]}
(120767) 1998 BS_{26}	27 January 1998	list^{[A]}
(129617) 1998 BV_{41}	30 January 1998	list^{[A]}
(145779) 1998 CC	1 February 1998	list^{[A]}

(171619) 2000 CX_{2}	2 February 2000	list^{[B]}
(173177) 1997 SW_{4}	23 September 1997	list^{[B]}
(216921) 1996 VC_{3}	9 November 1996	list^{[A]}
(257522) 1997 RH_{9}	11 September 1997	list^{[A]}
(310449) 2000 LC_{3}	4 June 2000	list^{[A]}
Co-discovery made with:^{A} L. Kornoš^{B} A. Galád
