= Koncert mladosti =

1976–1977 Czechoslovak music festival

- Genre: Jazz; Folk; Rock
- Dates: 31 July – 1 August 1976 (1st edition); 9–10 July 1977 (2nd edition)
- Locations: Amphitheater; Cajlanská 7; 902 01 Pezinok, Slovakia
- Coordinates: 48.2961°N 17.2672°E
- Years active: 2
- Established: March 1976; 50 years ago
- Founders: Pavol Boriš; Ladislav Snopko
- Attendance: 4,500 people
- Organized by: MO SZM Pezinok (Atlas klub)

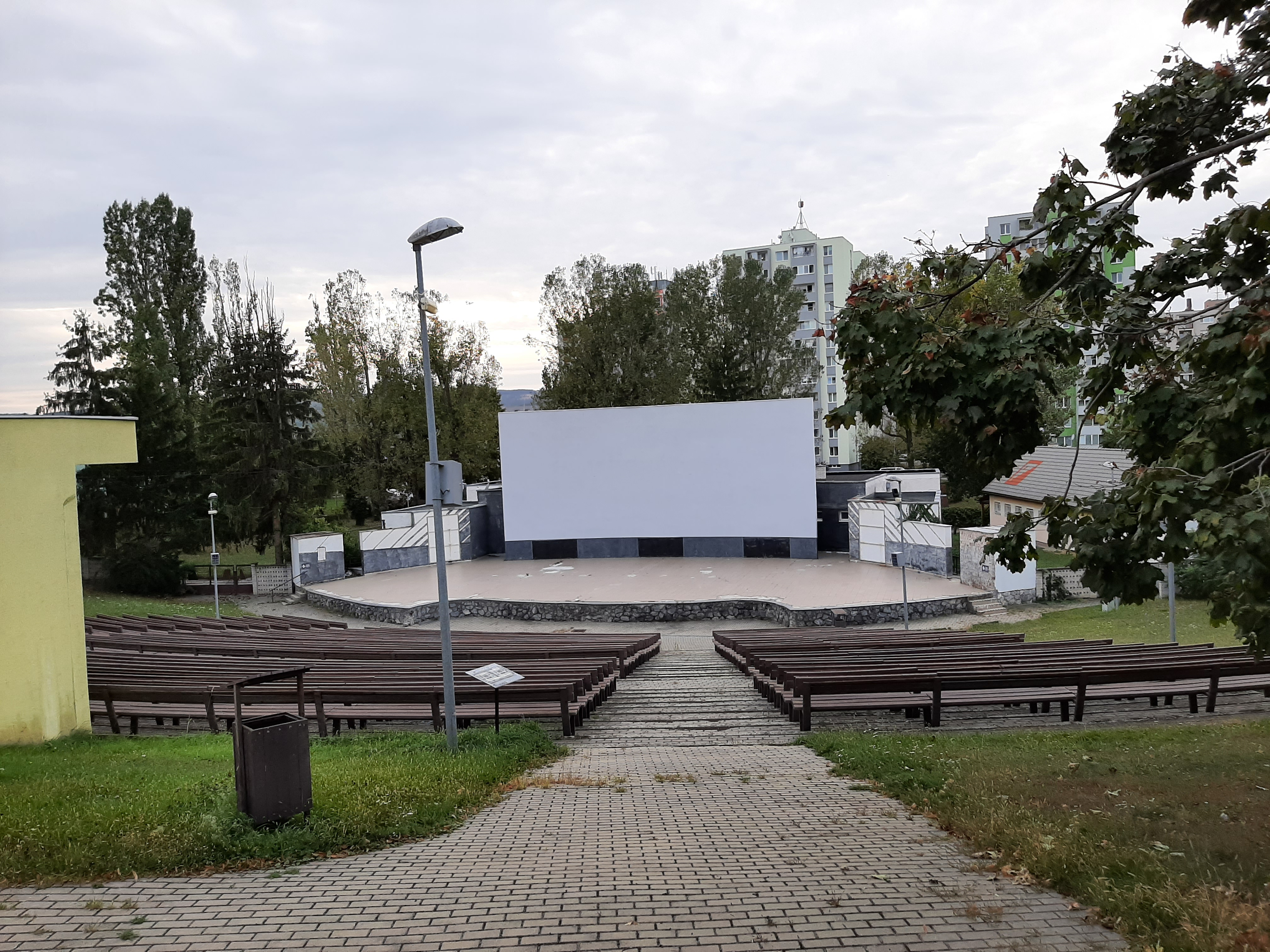
The venue of the Koncert mladosti festival (2023)

Koncert mladosti (literally "Concert of Youth") was Czechoslovak music festival, only two editions of which were held in 1976 and 1977 at the amphitheater in Pezinok, Slovakia. The main organizers of the events were Pavol Boriš and Ladislav Snopko, and the festival was the first open-air festival in Czechoslovak Socialist Republic ever. The music columnist Lubomír Dorůžka called him "Czechoslovak Woodstock" (Slovak: československý Woodstock).

The idea to organize the Koncert mladosti festival originated in March 1976 at the Atlas klub. After a concert, Ladislav "Agnes" Snopko and Paľo Boriš, while drinking wine in the club's kitchen, talked about the idea of organizing a larger event at the Amphitheater Pezinok. After positive feedback from others, Boriš and Snopko set about preparing the festival. Koncerty mladosti were an unprecedented cultural event, where top Czech-Slovak representatives of folk, rock and jazz performed – among other folk singers and Vladimír Merta, Petr Lutka, Vlasta Třešňák, Vladimír Veit, Pepa Nos, Miloš Janoušek, Dagmar Andrtová and Zuzana Homolová, folk-rock band Marsyas, rock Collegium musicum, Jaro Filip, Vladimir Mišík's band Etc... debut concert, pop-rock Modus, jazzmen Gabriel Jonáš and Pavol Kozma, jazz-rock bands Bohemia and Energit, including an offshoot, the Andršt/Viklický duo. The state media called the festival the festival of defiance against red normalization regime, the entrance fee cost 25 Kčs and during both years it was supposedly (according to Pavol Boriš) visited by 4,500 people.

In 1977, the moderators of the festival were Ladislav Snopko and Slávek Jíša. After Jaroslav Hutka sang the song "Havlíčku Havle", the visitors were anti-Bolshevik and thought about marching "against everything". The presenters calmed the situation by showing the film Yellow Submarine by the British music group The Beatles, which began with the notes of the French national anthem and the song "All You Need Is Love".

In 1978, a third year of the festival was planned, but it was eventually cancelled.

The atmosphere of the events was captured by photographer Ján Štrba and they were part of various commemorative exhibitions and books. Author of the posters of both years is Oliver Solga. The audio from both years was captured on tape by Petr Cibulka. The 1977 video footage was recorded on 16 mm silent film by ČST camera operators Petr Kákoš and Stano Slušný.

== Commemorative events ==
On 20 September 1997, after 20 years, the Pezinok Cultural Center organized a commemorative event, at which Emil Viklický, Fedor Frešo, Vlasta Třešňák, Jiří Dědeček, Dáša Voňková, Pepa Nos, Radim Hladík, Boris Urbánek, Roman Pokorný, Andrej Šeban, Marcel Buntaj, Oskar Rózsa, Luboš Andršt, Zdeněk Tichota and Ramblin Rex from the United States performed with local support bands Slide Return and Alarm. In 2007, memorial concert in Schaubmar's Mill was organized by P.R.D. civil association, during which the new book Koncert mladosti '76 – '77 – Československý Woodstock was baptized. In 2016 was held six-hours long Koncert mladosti 40 event. The Koncert mladosti Pezinok in the amphitheater to mark the 50th anniversary of the first year of the festival was held on 27 June 2026, preceded by an accompanying program in the city on 20-21 May and 4 June, specifically on 20 May, the opening of Jaroslav Prokop's photography exhibition entitled "Jaroslav Prokop: Portrét jednoho hudebního festivalu aneb Pezinok 1976" at the House of Culture in Pezinok and on 4 June, the opening of Ján Štrba's photography exhibition at the Town Museum with an accompanying discussion in the Radnica café.

== See also ==
- Atlas klub
