= Leonard Kornoš =

Slovak astronomer

Minor planets discovered: 37
see § List of discovered minor planets

Leonard Kornoš (born 1956) is a Slovak astronomer and a prolific discoverer of asteroids.

== Career ==
He is a lecturer at Comenius University in Bratislava, Slovakia, and known for his astrometric and photometric observations of asteroids and comets. His research includes the relations between meteoroid streams and their parent bodies. He is credited with the discovery of 37 minor planets, many of which are co-discoveries with astronomers Peter Kolény, Juraj Tóth, Adrián Galád, Dušan Kalmančok, Štefan Gajdoš and Jozef Világi.

== Awards and honors ==
The asteroid 23899 Kornoš, discovered by LONEOS at Anderson Mesa Station in 1998, was named in his honor. The official naming citation was published by the Minor Planet Center on 12 July 2014 (M.P.C. 89082).

== List of discovered minor planets ==
| 10207 Comeniana | 16 August 1997 | list^{[A]} |
| 13370 Júliusbreza | 7 November 1998 | list^{[A]} |
| 15376 Marták | 1 February 1997 | list^{[A]} |
| 21802 Svoreň | 6 October 1999 | list^{[B]} |
| 22469 Poloniny | 2 February 1997 | list^{[A]} |
| 22558 Mladen | 22 April 1998 | list^{[A]} |
| 24862 Hromec | 27 February 1996 | list^{[A]} |
| 24974 Macúch | 21 April 1998 | list^{[A]} |
| (28753) 2000 HA | 18 April 2000 | list^{[C]} |
| 29824 Kalmančok | 23 February 1999 | list^{[B]} |
| 33129 Ivankrasko | 1 February 1998 | list^{[A]} |
| 33158 Rúfus | 26 February 1998 | list^{[A]} |
| 39880 Dobšinský | 15 March 1998 | list^{[A]} |
| (43925) 1996 DB_{3} | 27 February 1996 | list^{[A]} |
| (48729) 1997 AG_{22} | 14 January 1997 | list^{[A]} |

| 53910 Jánfischer | 6 April 2000 | list^{[D]} |
| (58819) 1998 HF_{3} | 21 April 1998 | list^{[A]} |
| 59389 Oskarvonmiller | 24 March 1999 | list^{[B]} |
| 59419 Prešov | 9 April 1999 | list^{[E]} |
| 67019 Hlohovec | 13 December 1999 | list^{[B]} |
| (69461) 1996 UA_{3} | 24 October 1996 | list^{[A]} |
| (73974) 1998 BT_{26} | 29 January 1998 | list^{[A]} |
| (74424) 1999 BN | 17 January 1999 | list^{[A]} |
| (79361) 1997 DA | 16 February 1997 | list^{[A]} |
| (80009) 1999 GD_{2} | 8 April 1999 | list^{[C]} |
| (96379) 1998 BH | 18 January 1998 | list^{[A]} |
| (100704) 1998 BG | 17 January 1998 | list^{[A]} |
| (102626) 1999 VY_{27} | 15 November 1999 | list^{[B]} |
| (120767) 1998 BS_{26} | 27 January 1998 | list^{[A]} |
| (121336) 1999 TF_{6} | 6 October 1999 | list^{[B]} |

| (125372) 2001 VE_{72} | 15 November 2001 | list^{[B]} |
| (129617) 1998 BV_{41} | 30 January 1998 | list^{[A]} |
| (145779) 1998 CC | 1 February 1998 | list^{[A]} |
| (216921) 1996 VC_{3} | 9 November 1996 | list^{[A]} |
| (257522) 1997 RH_{9} | 11 September 1997 | list^{[A]} |
| (288471) 2004 FF_{3} | 18 March 2004 | list^{[F]} |
| (310449) 2000 LC_{3} | 4 June 2000 | list^{[A]} |
Co-discovery made with:^{A} P. Kolény^{B} J. Tóth^{C} A. Galád^{D} D. Kalmančok^{E} Š. Gajdoš^{F} J. Világi

== See also ==
- List of minor planet discoverers § L. Kornos
