= Ladislav Snopko =

Slovak politician (born 1949)

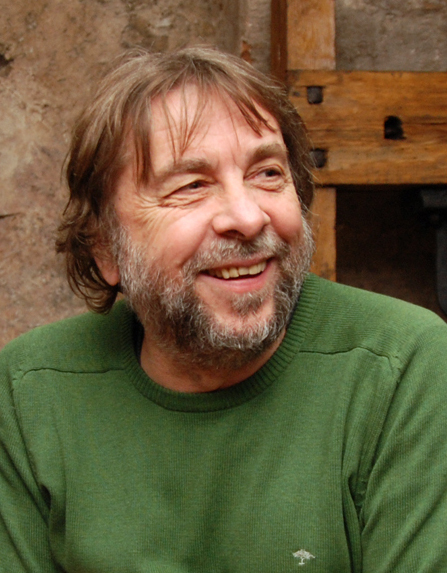
- Snopko in 2010
- Born: 9 December 1949 (age 76); Košice, Czechoslovakia
- Other name: Agnes
- Citizenship: Slovakia
- Education: Faculty of Arts, Comenius University
- Occupations: Archaeologist, politician
- Known for: Ministry of Culture of Slovak Republic; Koncert mladosti

Ladislav "Agnes" Snopko (born 9 December 1949) is a Slovak archaeologist and politician, former Minister of Culture of the Slovak Republic and Member of Parliament of the Bratislava Region.

== Political career ==
- 29 March 1990 – 26 June 1990 – Minister of Culture in the "national understanding" government led by Milan Čič, nominated by Public Against Violence. He replaced Ladislav Chudík.
- 27 June 1990 – 24 June 1992 – Minister of Culture in the first government of Vladimír Mečiar and subsequently of Ján Čarnogurský
- 2005 – elected for Independent Forum as a member of the Bratislava Region Council in Bratislava V district
