= Modranská železnica =

Modranská železnica (Modra hlavná stanica)
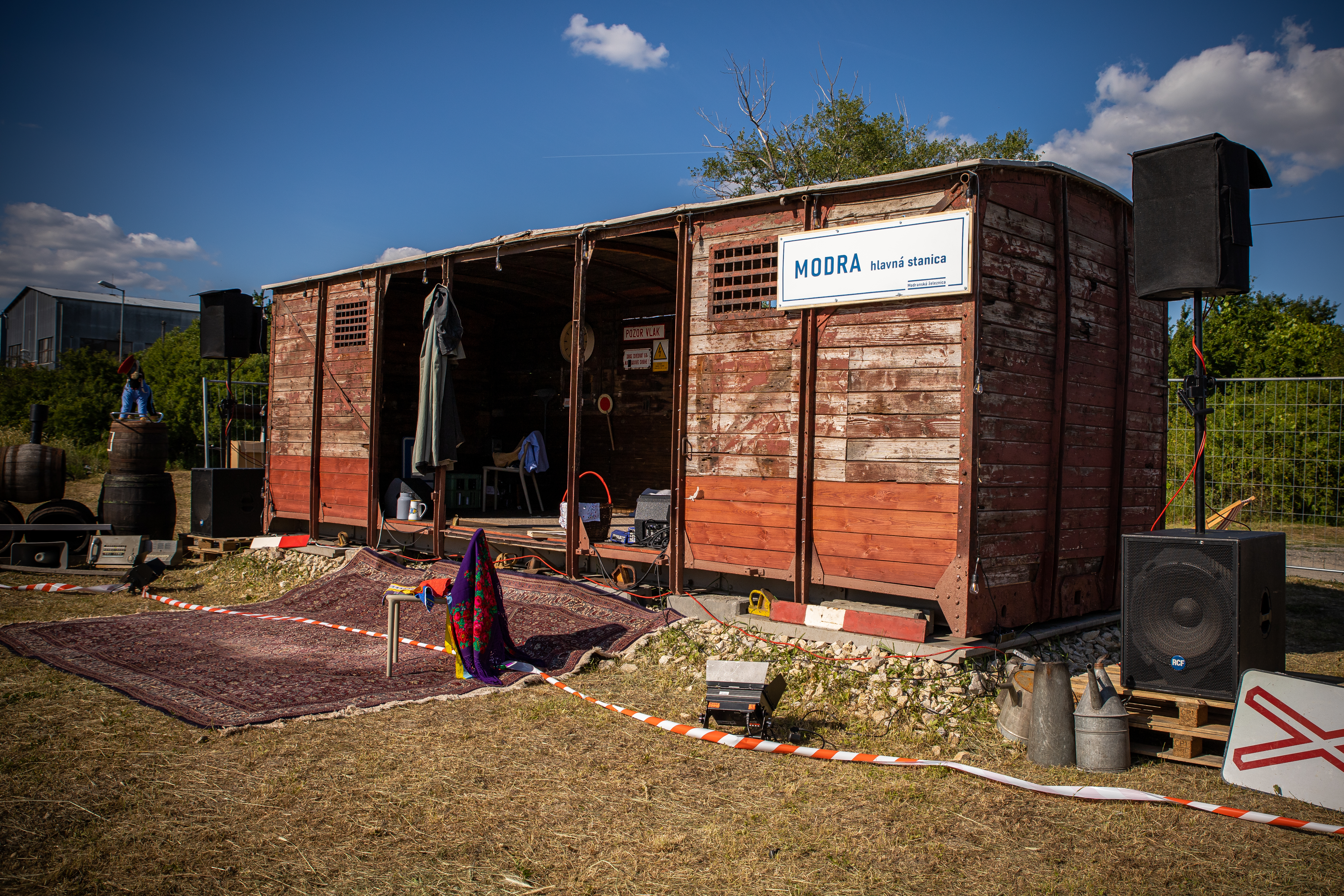
- A historic wagon of Modranská železnica
- Interactive map of the Modranská železnica (Modra hlavná stanica) area

General information
- Location: Dolná, 900 01 Modra, Modra, Slovakia
- Coordinates: 48.3238946°N 17.3144870°E
- Construction started: 2021
- Owner: Peter Bittner

Website
- Official site

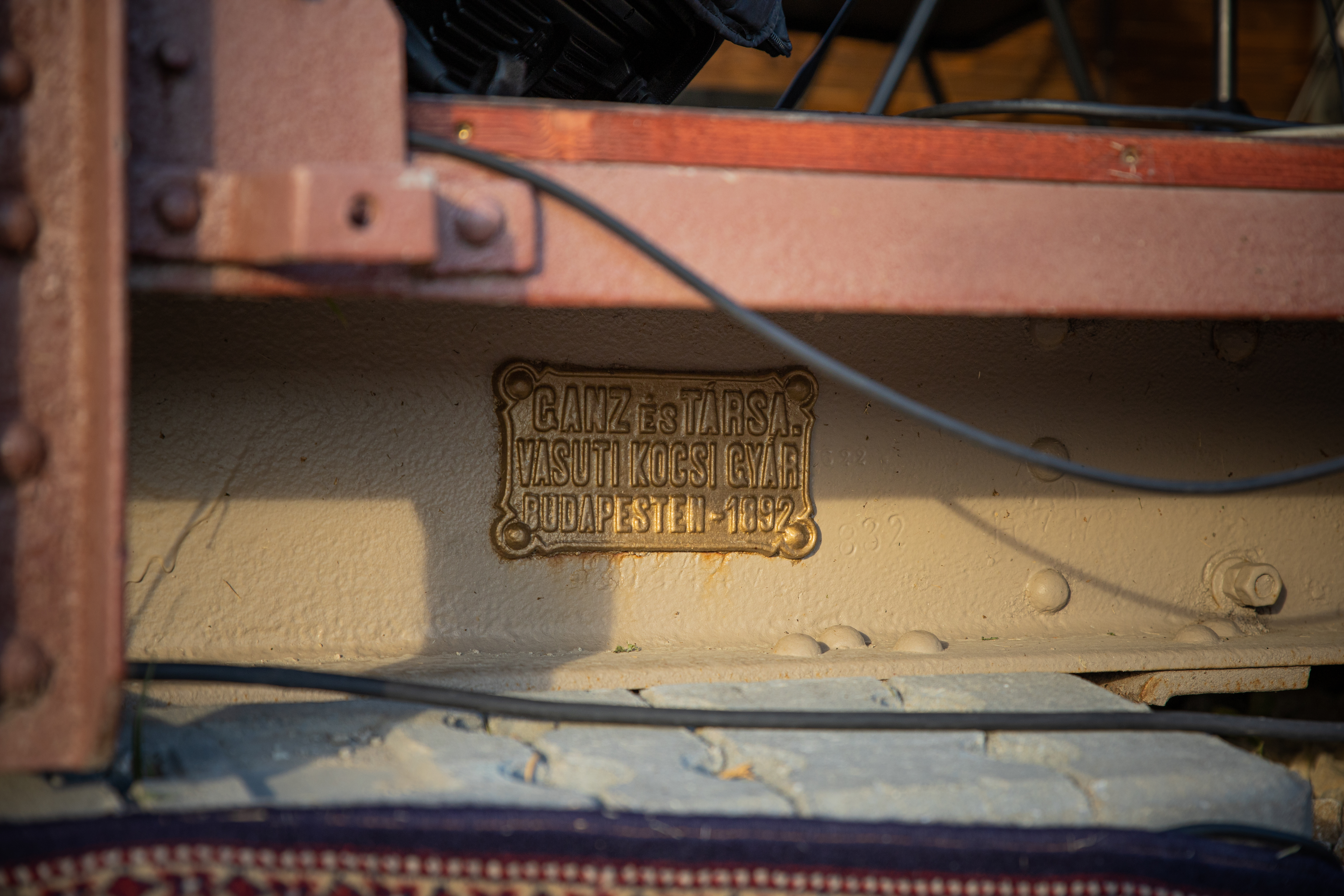
A golden sign in the Hungarian language placed on the bottom of a historic wagon

The Modranská železnica (English: Modra railway, Slovak pronunciation: ['mɔdranskaː 'ʐelezɲitsa]) alebo Modra hlavná stanica (English: Modra main railway station, Slovak pronunciation: ['mɔdra 'hlavnaː 'staɲitsa]) is cultural space and imaginary railway station located on a field between the collection yard and the winery on Dolná Street in Modra. It is a historic railway wagon from 1892 surrounded by railway artifacts.

The space was inaugurated on April 30, 2022, at 5.00 p.m. and is led by Peter Bittner.

Despite the fact that in culture the railway is sometimes associated with Modra (e.g. in the lyrics of the song "Vymyslená" by Elán), in reality no railway line leads to Modra.
