= Modra =

- Municipality
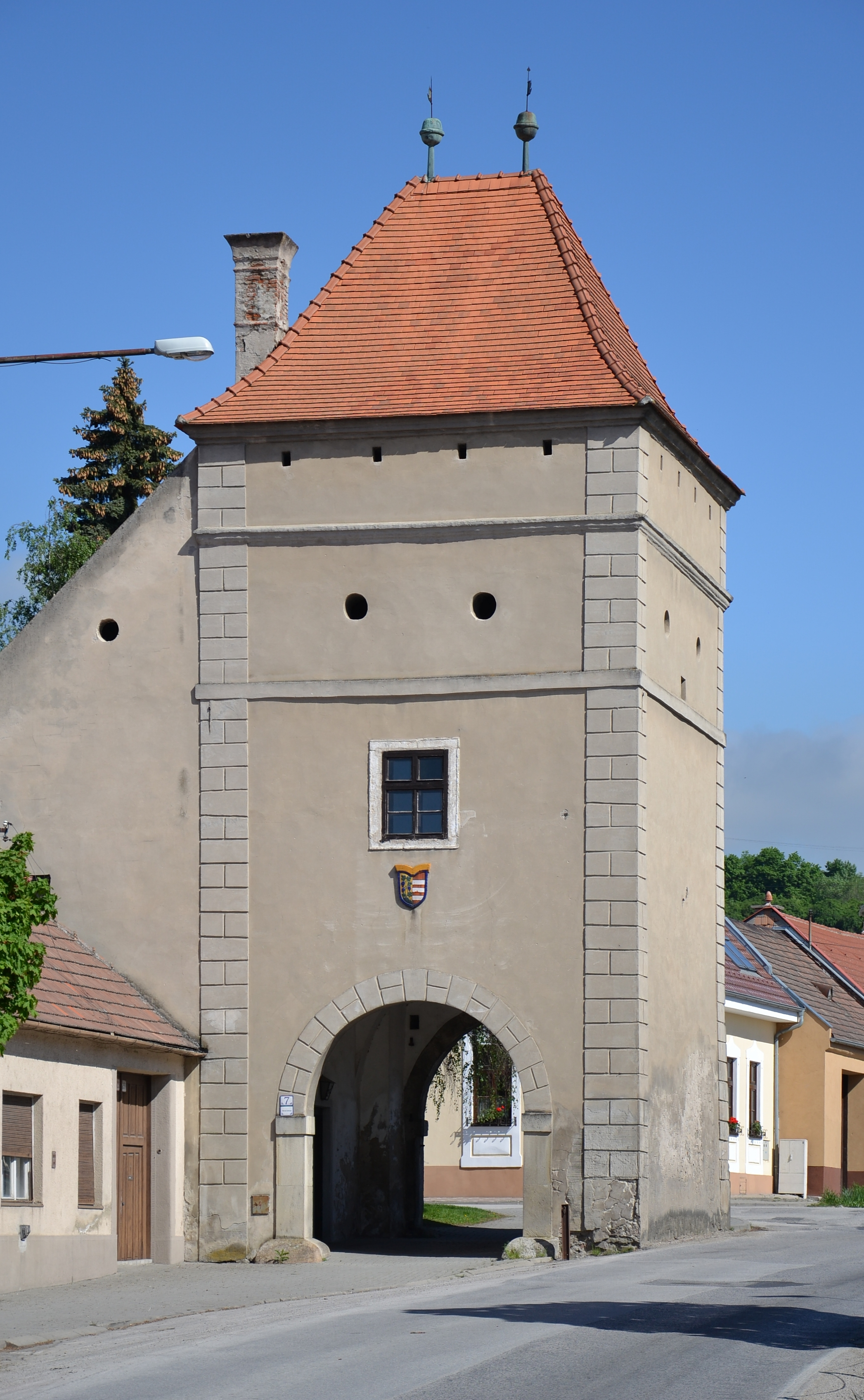
- The "Upper Gate", the only remaining fortification gate in Modra

- Flag Coat of arms

- Location of Modra in the Bratislava Region Location of Modra in Slovakia
- Coordinates: 48.33°N 17.31°E
- Country: Slovakia
- Region: Bratislava Region
- District: Pezinok District
- First mentioned: 1158

Government
  - Mayor: Mgr. Juraj Petrakovič

Area
  - Total: 49.62 km^{2} (19.16 sq mi)
- Elevation: 314 m (1,030 ft)

Population (2025)
  - Total: 9,055
- Time zone: UTC+1 (CET)
  - Summer (DST): UTC+2 (CEST)
- Postal code: 900 01
- Area code: +421 33
- Vehicle registration plate (until 2022): PK
- Website: www.modra.sk

Modra (German: Modern, Hungarian: Modor, Latin: Modur) is a city and municipality in the Bratislava Region in Slovakia. It has a population of 9,201 as of 2013. It nestles in the foothills of the Malé Karpaty (Little Carpathian mountains) and is an excellent centre for hiking.

Modra is famous for its pottery industry. Its blue-and-white porcelain is famous throughout Slovakia.

It is also known as one of the most important viticulture centres in the Little Carpathians region.

Besides the main town, there are also other adjacent settlements incorporated in the municipality: former vassalage viticulture village Kráľová and two recreational hamlets of Harmónia and Piesok (also known as Zochova Chata), both located in the woods of Little Carpathians mountains.

== Geography ==
The municipality lies at an altitude of 314 metres (1,030 ft) and covers an area of 49.62 km^{2} (19.16 sq mi) (2025).

== Etymology ==
Most experts agree that the name is connected to Slovak: modrá (blue). The name probably originates from another historic geographic name in the neighbourhood, e.g., Modrá hora (Blue Mountain). According to a less probable hypothesis, the name comes from Hungarian: madár (a bird).

== History ==
The first traces of habitation go back to the 3rd millennium BCE, and the first permanent habitation dates back to the time of Great Moravia, when the Slavs lived there. The first mention of Modra was in 1158 in a document of the Géza II of Hungary, when it belonged to the bishop of Nitra. After the Mongol invasion of 1241, the settlement was reconstructed by the German colonists. The first mention of vineyards goes back to 1321. The settlement received its town privileges in 1361 and became a free royal town in 1607. The town fortifications with three gates were constructed in 1610–1647. Since the 17th century, it has been one of the leading craft centers in present-day Slovakia. The ceramic industry and majolica production started in the 19th century. In 1883, a school of ceramics was established, where through the skillfulness of Habaners, the so-called Slovak ceramics were created. The railway track from Bratislava to Trnava bypassed the town in the 1840s, as the local magistrate refused to allow the railway construction.

== Population ==
Historical population
Year	Pop.	±%
1970	7,249	—
1980	7,679	+5.9%
1991	8,090	+5.4%
2001	8,536	+5.5%
2011	8,751	+2.5%
2021	9,346	+6.8%
Source: Censuses

Population statistic (10 years)
Year	1995	2005	2015	2025
Count	8426	8704	8901	9055
Difference		+3.29%	+2.26%	+1.73%

Population statistic
Year	2024	2025
Count	9160	9055
Difference		−1.14%

It has a population of 9055 people (31 December 2025).

=== Ethnicity ===
Census 2021 (1+ %)
Ethnicity	Number	Fraction
Slovak	8599	92%
Not found out	581	6.21%
Czech	114	1.21%
Total	9346	

In year 2021 was 9346 people by ethnicity 8599 as Slovak, 581 as Not found out, 114 as Czech, 83 as Hungarian, 48 as Other, 32 as German, 23 as Rusyn, 19 as Russian, 17 as Ukrainian, 13 as Italian, 12 as Romani, 10 as French, 10 as Croatian, 9 as Serbian, 9 as Moravian, 6 as Jewish, 6 as Polish, 4 as Bulgarian, 4 as English, 3 as Austrian, 3 as Canadian, 3 as Albanian, 2 as Irish, 2 as Romanian, 2 as Greek and 1 as Silesian.

Note on population: The difference values of population numbers in the table "Population statistic" and in the sections "Ethnicity" & "Religion" is caused by the use of various statistical methods.

=== Religion ===
Census 2021 (1+ %)
Religion	Number	Fraction
Roman Catholic Church	3903	41.76%
None	2945	31.51%
Evangelical Church	1584	16.95%
Not found out	573	6.13%
Total	9346	

In year 2021 was 9346 people by religion 3903 from Roman Catholic Church, 2945 from None, 1584 from Evangelical Church, 573 from Not found out, 64 from Greek Catholic Church, 42 from Ad hoc movements, 41 from Other, 39 from Eastern Orthodox Church, 33 from Other and not ascertained christian church, 32 from Christian Congregations in Slovakia, 23 from Buddhism, 15 from Paganism and natural spirituality, 11 from Calvinist Church, 7 from Jehovah's Witnesses, 6 from Apostolic Church, 5 from Jewish community, 5 from Old Catholic Church, 4 from United Methodist Church, 4 from Seventh-day Adventist Church, 3 from Islam, 3 from Hinduism, 1 from Czechoslovak Hussite Church, 1 from Church of the Brethren, 1 from Baptists Church and 1 from Bahá'i Community.

== Landmarks ==
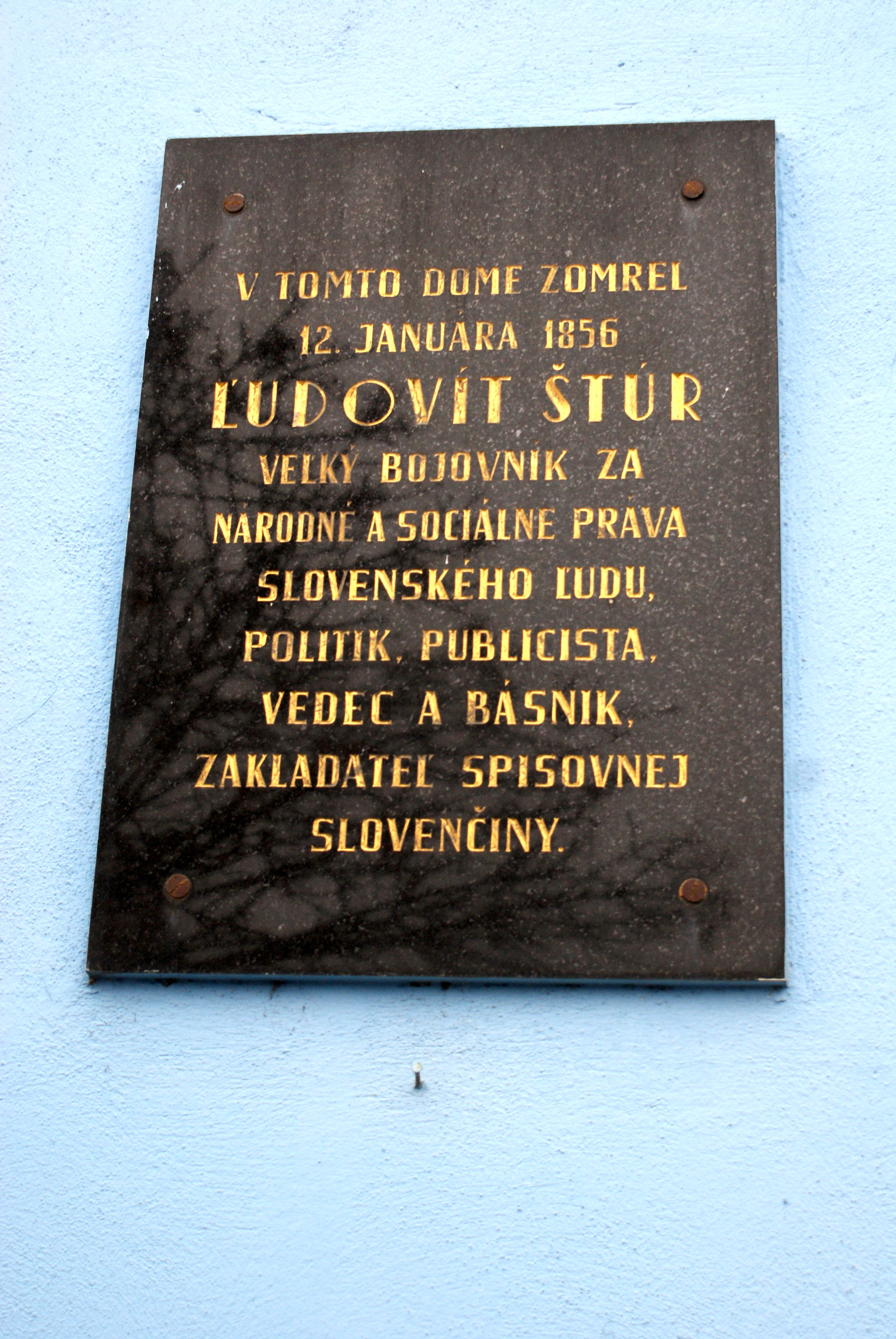
Memorial plate of Ľudovít Štúr on the Museum wall

- Modra Observatory of the Comenius University in Bratislava near Modra-Piesok
- A grave memorial museum (with an external exhibition "Štúrova izba" (memorable room of Štúr) and statue of Ľudovít Štúr, who died here in 1856
- Remains of the former fortifications: a bastion (with a gallery of Ignác Bizmayer, pottery master) and the "Upper Gate", the only one of three original town gates to be preserved
- A country castle just behind the upper gate; seat of the vineyard school
- A Renaissance building from the end of the 17th century
- the present-day workshops specialising on the Modra ceramics
- Churches:
  - Roman Catholic Church of St. Stephen the King from years 1873–1876 on the market square
  - Roman Catholic Church of St. John the Baptist from the 2nd half of the 14th century at the cemetery with the names of victims of the First World War
  - Evangelical church of Augsburg Confession ("German church") from 1714, present-day form since 1834
  - Evangelical church of Apostles Peter and Paul ("Slovak church") from 1715, present-day form since 1826, standing near the "German church"
  - small Baroque chapel of Mary Immaculate from 1740, standing in front of the evangelical churches
  - Chapel of St. Michael from 1873
- "Modranské oskoruše" - a legally protected area with a group of three exceptionally old service trees (Cormus domestica), the largest of which is a service tree with an estimated age of 360 to 500 years.

== Modra in fiction ==
In 2010 the Canadian film director Ingrid Veninger made a film about returning to the town after many years in Canada, called MODRA, starring Alexander Gammal and her daughter Hallie Switzer.

== Notable people ==
- Stefan Balaz, Architect
- Svetozar Miletić (1826-1901), Serbian advocate, Journalist, author and politician, studied here at the gymnasium
- Martina Šimkovičová (born 1971), TV presenter and politician
- Ľudovít Štúr (1815-1856), Slovak writer and politician; lived his last years in Modra and died here
- Ondrej Rigo (1955-2022), Slovak serial killer

== Twin towns — sister cities ==
Modra is twinned with:

- Benátky nad Jizerou, Czech Republic
- Hustopeče, Czech Republic
- Overijse, Belgium

== See also ==
- Modranská železnica
