= Amphitheater Pezinok =

Entertainment venue in Pezinok, Slovakia

- Amfiteáter Pezinok
- Amfík
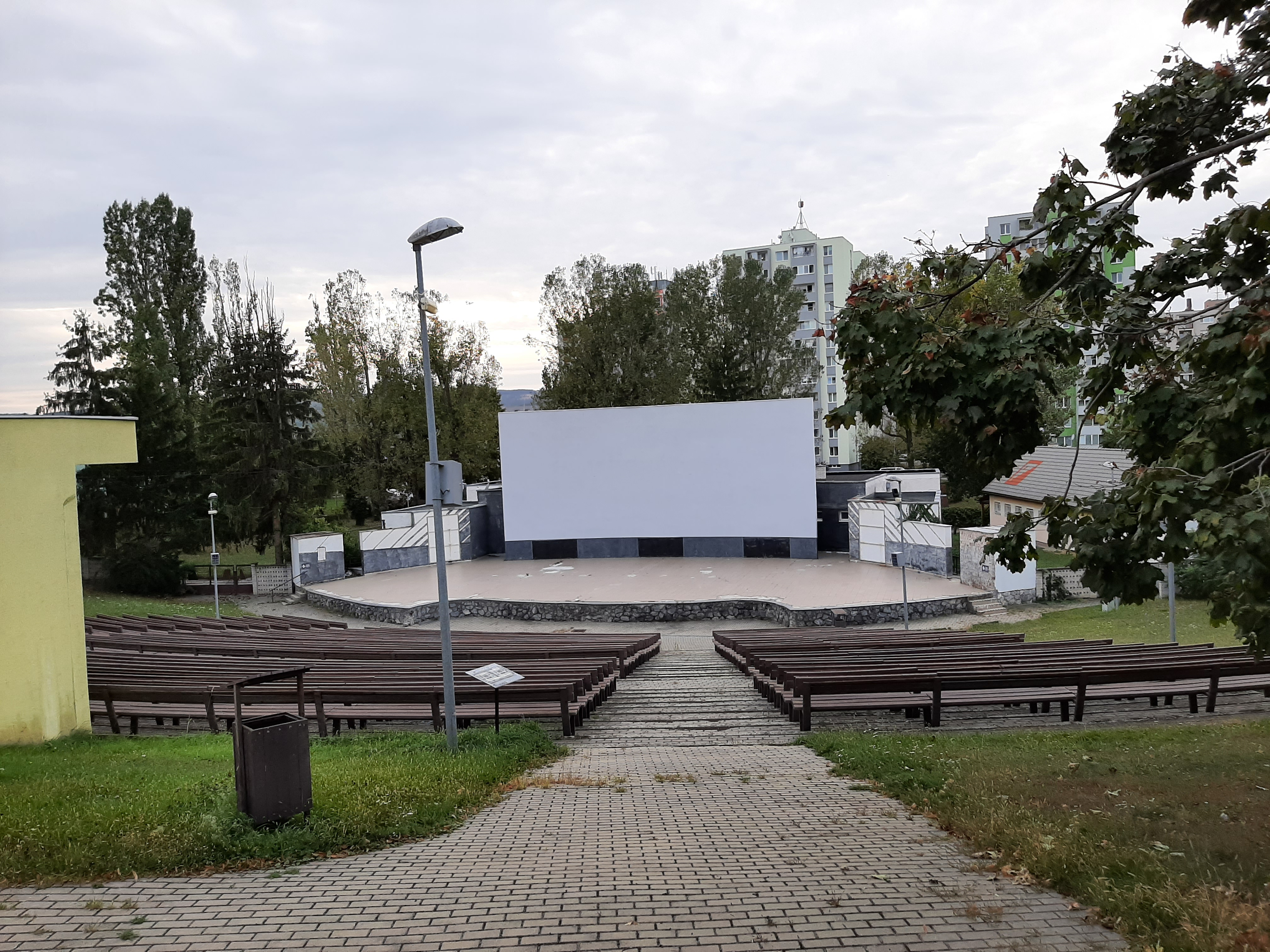
- Projection area, stage and auditorium of the amphitheater in 2023
- Interactive map of Amphitheater Pezinok
- Address: Cajlanská 7; 902 01 Pezinok-Cajla; Slovakia
- Location: Cajla, Pezinok, Slovakia
- Coordinates: 48.296077°N 17.267239°E
- Owner: Town of Pezinok
- Operator: Pezinok Cultural Center
- Current use: amphitheater/summer cinema
- Public transit: Public transport lines No. 2 and 22 to/from Amfiteáter bus stop
- Parking: outdoor parking lot

Construction
- Opened: early 1960s

Website
- kcpezinok.sk kinopezinok.sk

The Amphitheater Pezinok (Slovak: Amfiteáter Pezinok, colloquially Amfík) is an amphitheater and a summer cinema located on Cajlanská Street 7 in Cajla, Pezinok, Slovakia.

== History ==
It was completed as part of the "Z" campaign and its construction cost 1,434,000 Kčs. It has been in continuous summer activity since the early 1960s.

From 1964 to 1972, the Beatclub youth club was located here.

The festival Koncert mladosti was held here in 1976 and 1977.

In the 1980s, the Bratislava-vidiek District Education Center (Slovak: Okresné osvetové stredisko Bratislava-vidiek) was located here, which organized the Hudobný festival mladých in 1987 and 1989.

== Present ==
The amphitheater was the first in Slovakia to be able to project digital media. It is used as a summer cinema of the Pezinok Cultural Center, but also for concerts and other cultural events. Movies are always shown here at 9:15 pm, or at 9:00 pm in August.

Since 2017, films have been screened in the amphitheater in seven-channel sound.
