= Socialist Youth Union (Czechoslovakia) =

Youth wing of Communist Party in Czechoslovakia

Socialist Youth Union SSM / SZM Czech: Socialistický svaz mládeže Slovak: Socialistický zväz mládeže
- Emblem
- Founded: 1970
- Preceded by: Czechoslovak Youth Union
- Dissolved: 1990
- Headquarters: Prague, Czechoslovak Socialist Republic
- Membership: 1.6 million (1982)
- Ideology: Communism; Marxism-Leninism
- Mother party: Communist Party of Czechoslovakia
- National affiliation: National Front of Czechs and Slovaks
- International affiliation: World Federation of Democratic Youth
- Newspaper: Mladá fronta Smena

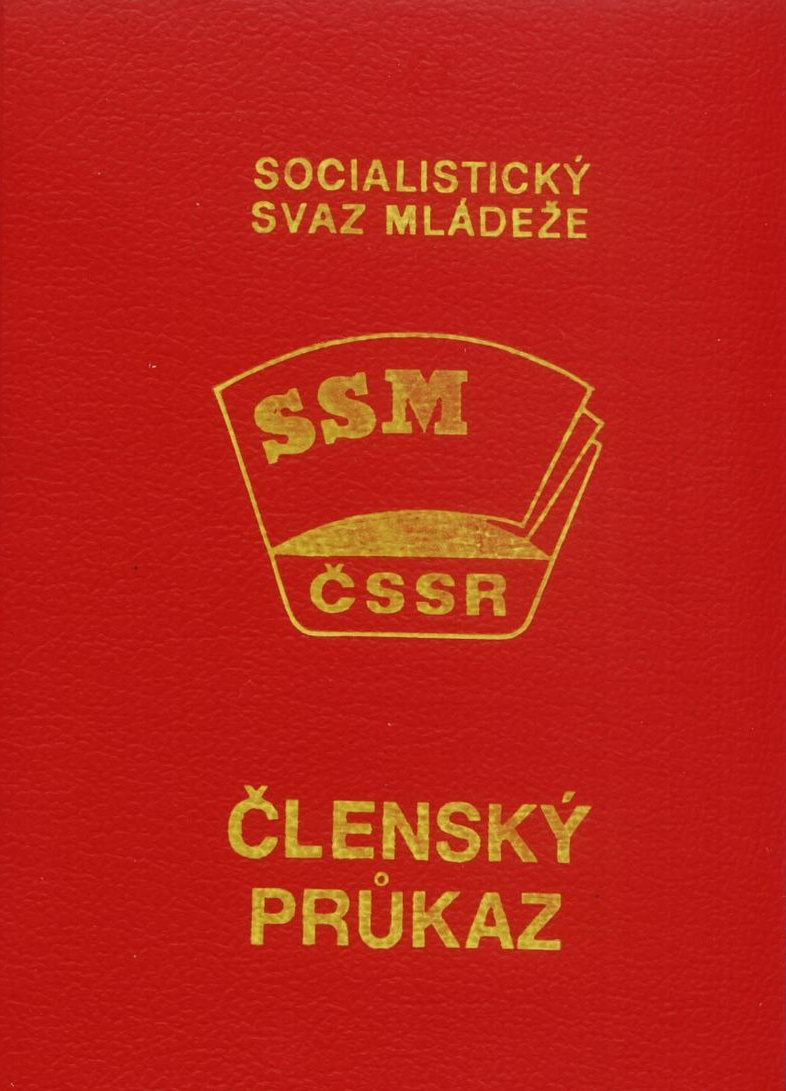
SSM membership booklet

The Socialist Youth Union (SSM) was a mass organization which served as the youth wing of the Communist Party in the Czechoslovak Socialist Republic from 1970 to 1990. It existed alongside the Pioneer Organization, which was geared towards younger children who were expected to join the SSM in their teens. Membership stood at 1.6 million in 1982.

It was created as a successor to the Czechoslovak Union of Youth, which ceased to exist in the wake of the invasion of Czechoslovakia in 1968. It provided both physical and ideological education to the youth of Czechoslovakia, and membership was highly encouraged for career-minded young people. Recruitment was intense, especially in educational institutions, to the point that many of the organization's members were unenthusiastic about the communist cause, leading some to complain that even beatniks were allowed to join its ranks. The SSM was organized on national, regional, and local levels and operated a large number of educational, art, and sporting facilities. The SSM was dissolved at its final congress in January 1990, following the Velvet Revolution and the fall of communism in Czechoslovakia.

== See also ==
- Youth organizations in Communist Czechoslovakia
- Free German Youth
- Komsomol
- League of Socialist Youth of Yugoslavia
- Polish Socialist Youth Union
