= Modra Observatory =

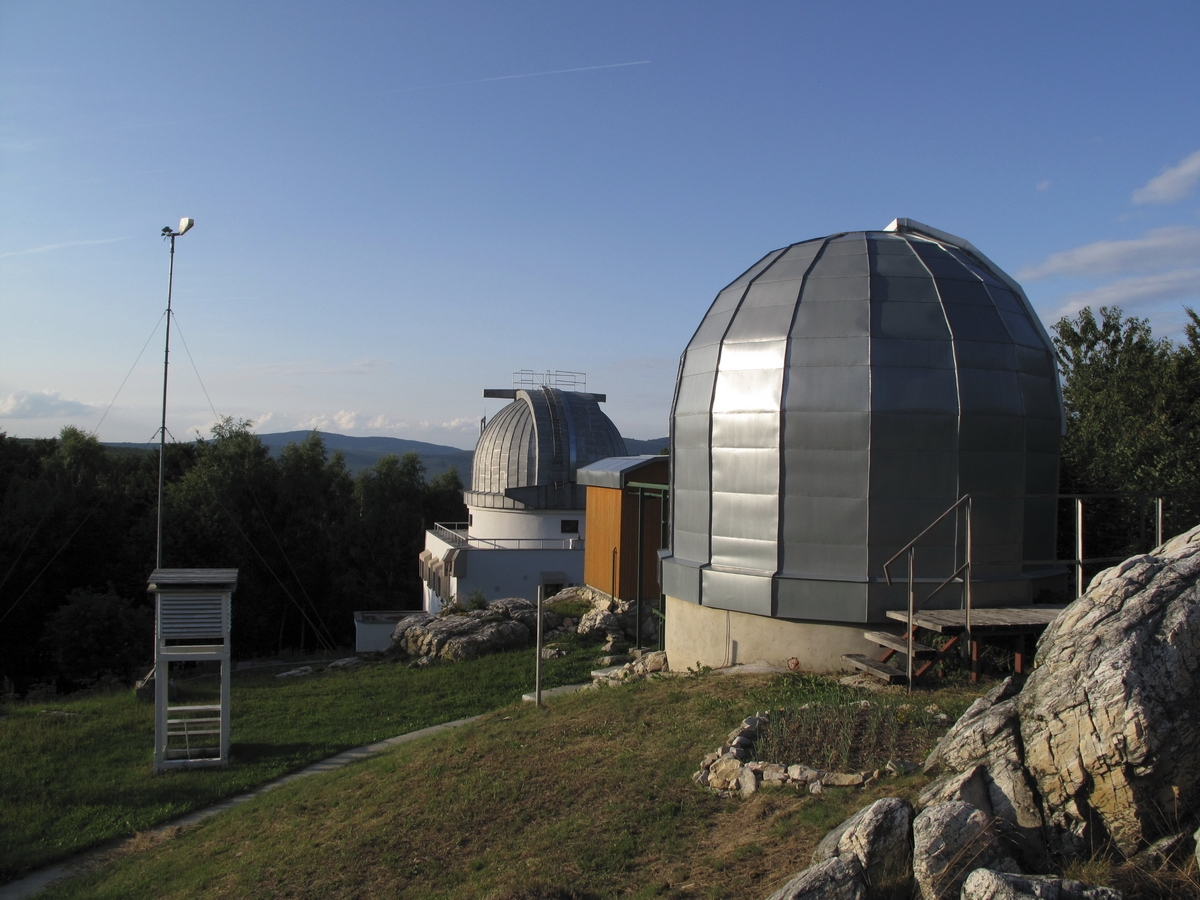
- Modra observatory in 2009
- Organization: Comenius University Faculty of Mathematics
- Observatory code: 118
- Location: Modra, Slovakia
- Coordinates: 48.373273°N 17.274021°E
- Altitude: 531.10 m (1,742.5 ft)
- Established: 1988
- Website: www.daa.fmph.uniba.sk

Telescopes
- 0.70 m: reflector with CCD camera
- 0.60 m: reflector with CCD camera
- 0.20 m: solar refractor with H-alpha filter
- 0.25 m: educational Newton telescope with CCD camera
- 0.28 m: public outreach Schmidt-Cassegrain telescope
- 0.28 m: transiting exoplanets follow-up Schmidt-Cassegrain telescope with CCD camera
- Related media on Commons

The Astronomical Observatory of Modra (Slovak: Astronomické observatórium Modra), also known as Modra Observatory or the Astronomical and Geophysical observatory in Modra, is an astronomical observatory located in Modra, Slovakia. It is owned and operated by the Comenius University in Bratislava. The scientific research at the observatory is led by the Department of Astronomy, Physics of the Earth and Meteorology, Faculty of Mathematics, Physics and Informatics.

The asteroid 11118 Modra discovered at this observatory is named in the honor of the town.

== About ==
The Astronomical and Geophysical observatory of Comenius University is located near the town of Modra and in the mountain range of Little Carpathians. The 3.5-hectare area contains several buildings and scientific instruments surrounded by beech forest. It lies on the middle trias quartzitic bedrock. It is accessible via a tourist trail or by the private paved road from Zochova chata. The main administrative building with the dome on the top contains the 0.60-metre Zeiss telescope with CCD camera and the 0.20-metre solar telescope with H-alpha filter. Within walking distance there are several buildings and pavilions with scientific devices, such as the magnetic pavilion (measurement of the Earth's magnetic field), the seismic cell with the seismograph, the solar telescope dome, the dome with the Schumann resonances registration device and the meteor pavilion of photographic and video meteor detection. The upper building with the 5-metre dome has a 0.70-metre reflecting telescope with CCD primarily for space debris research and registration devices for GPS and forward scatter meteor radar of the Bologna-Lecce-Modra network (transceiver-receiver-receiver). The lower building, standing next to the pond, consists of a small conference room and housing facility for guests. Since 1988, continuous weather and meteorological observations are done, therefore, the data provide a unique and homogeneous climate record of the site. In 2012 open-air amphitheater with seating, screen, projector and sound system was built for the public outreach purposes.

== Education and research ==
As a part of the Comenius University, the observatory provides research opportunity for students, and the staff offers guidance for the Master and PhD theses. The research is mainly aimed at the interplanetary matter. Until January 2014, 175 numbered and 34 unnumbered asteroids were discovered at the observatory including two Near Earth Objects 2005 GB34 and 2008 UW5. The observing time is mostly assigned for the photometry of asteroids and comets and astrometry. The first observation of a transiting extrasolar planet in Slovakia was performed at the observatory. The solar physics researchers perform solar prominence and chromosphere features observations in the H-alpha line.

The observatory is also a member of the European bolide network and it has been developing its own TV meteor detection grid. Besides photographic all-sky cameras, fish-eye all-sky semi-automated meteor detection devices are located at Modra observatory, near Tesárske Mlyňany and in Kysucké Nové Mesto. In addition to meteor detection, real time all-sky cameras detect other phenomena, such as atmospheric sprites and elves (TLE).

== Proposed Wide Field Survey (ADAM-WFS) ==
Based on the study on detecting close approaching Near-Earth Asteroids scientists of the department proposed a wide-field survey called "Automated Detection of Asteroids and Meteoroids - Wide Field Survey" (ADAM-WFS) aimed at discovery of small asteroids in the Earth vicinity and orbital debris.

In contrast to current asteroid surveys that are based on narrower field of view but deeper limiting magnitude, ADAM-WFS will observe entire visible night sky three times per night and identify moving targets. This survey is also considered as a low-cost project. It will use existing and verified methods and techniques, such as Moving Object Processing Pipeline (used by Pan-STARRS, NEOWISE, LSST). The proposed survey is similar to Asteroid Terrestrial-impact Last Alert System. If funded, the telescope will be housed in the Solar dome.

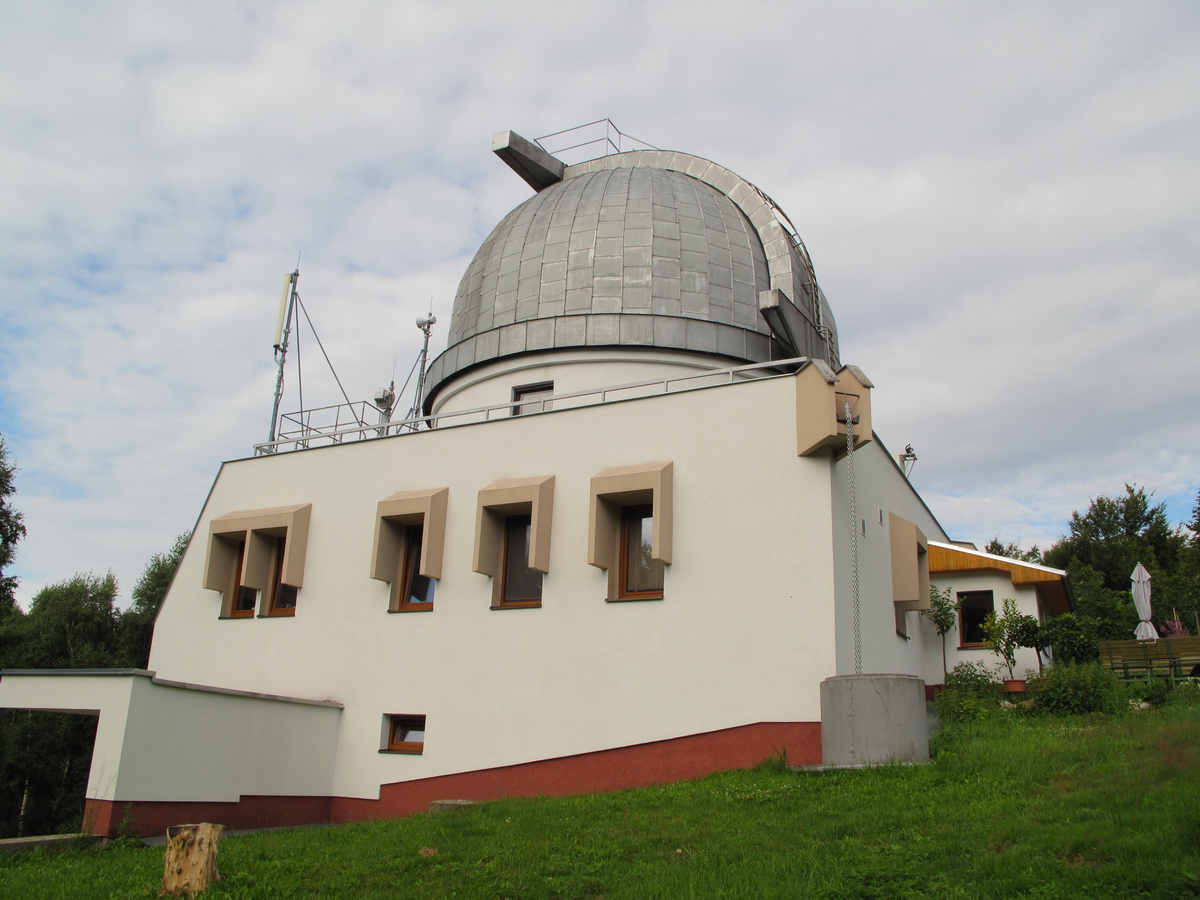
Main operation and administrative building of Modra observatory.

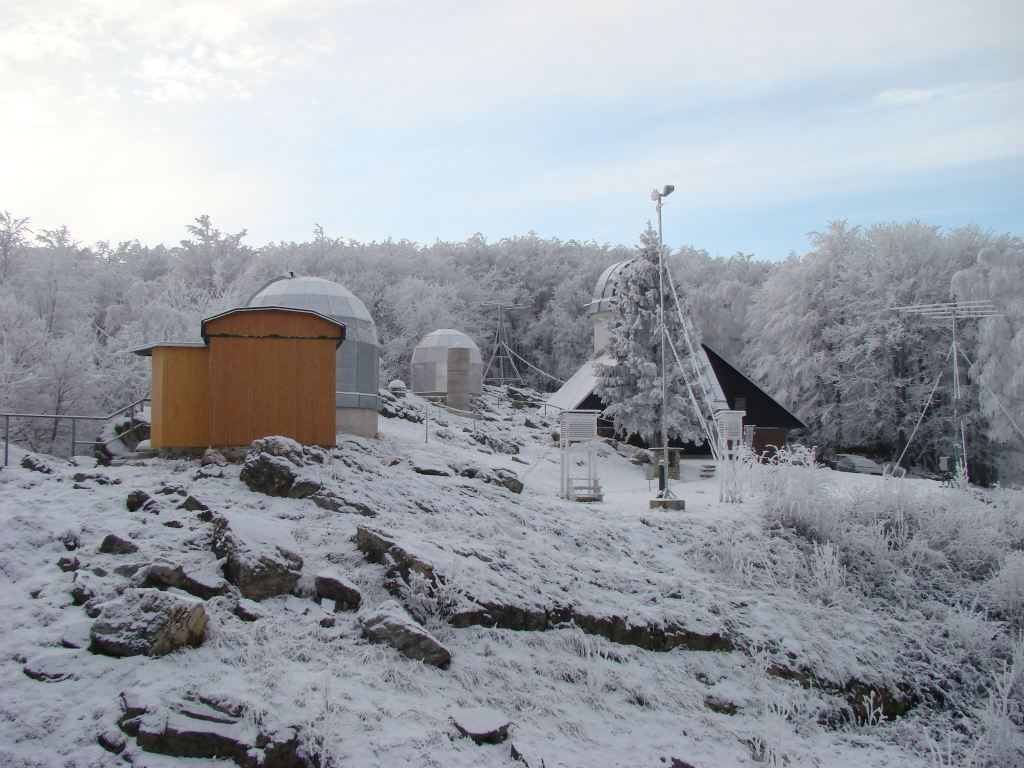
Winter at the Modra observatory.

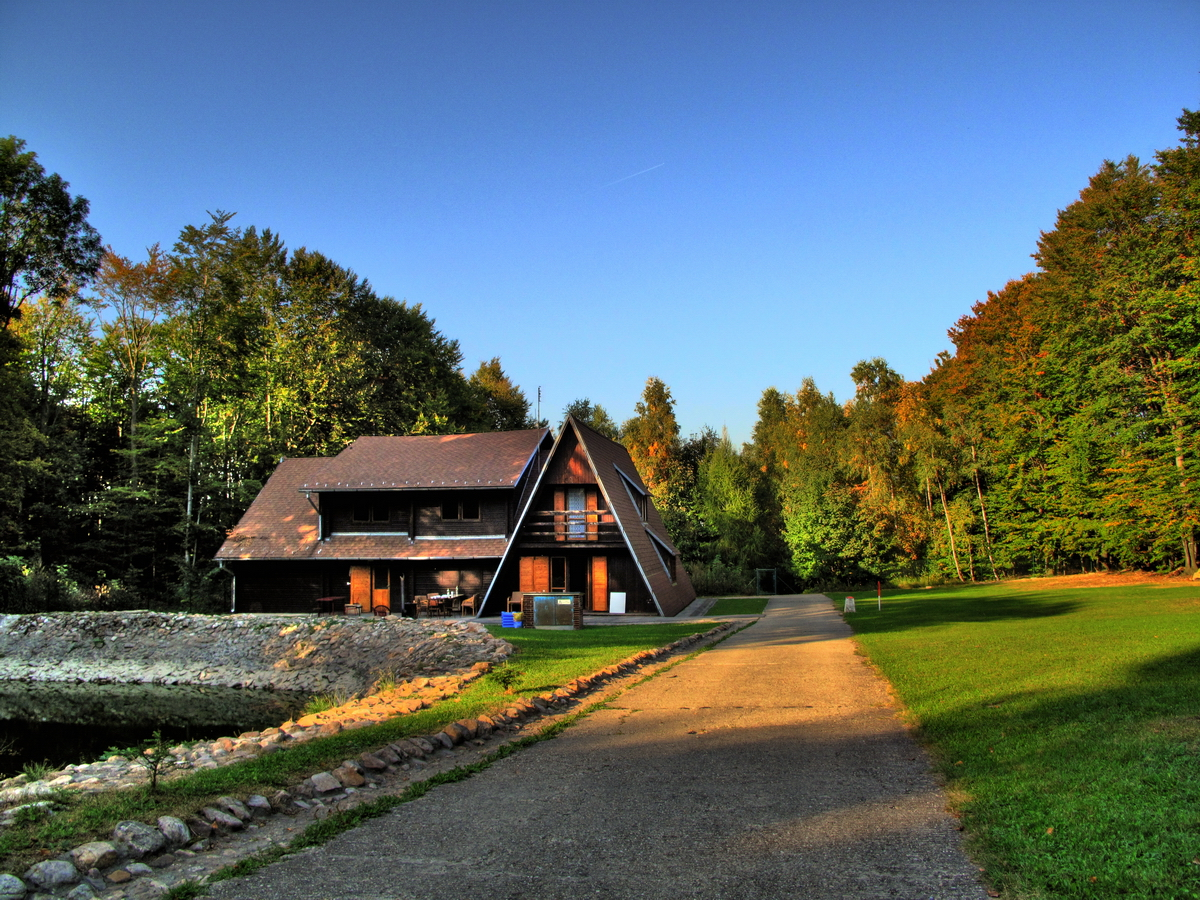
Lower building of the Modra observatory complex.

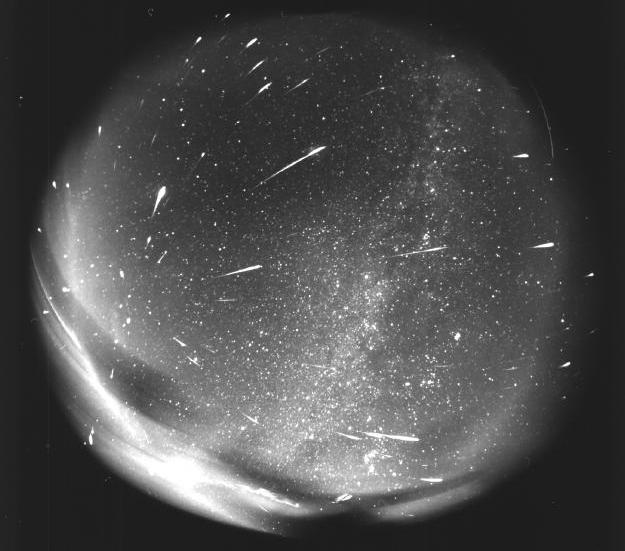
Leonid meteor shower detected at Modra observatory, bolides on single photographic plate.

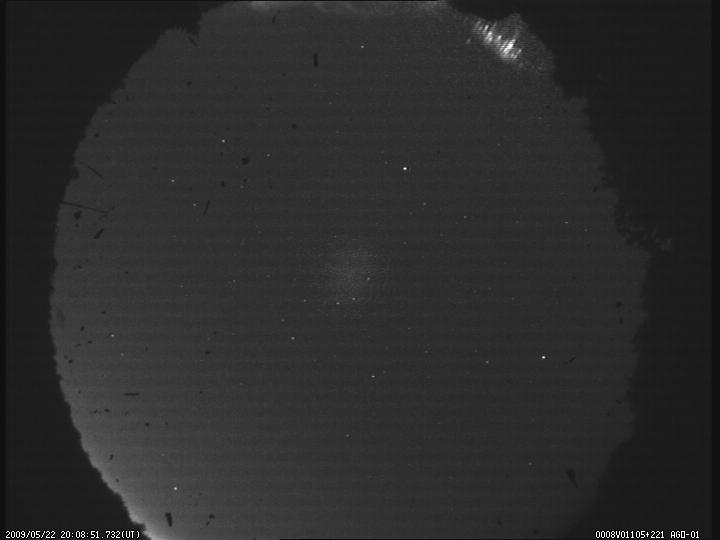
Sprites detected above horizon at Modra observatory.

Active solar area as seen from Modra observatory.

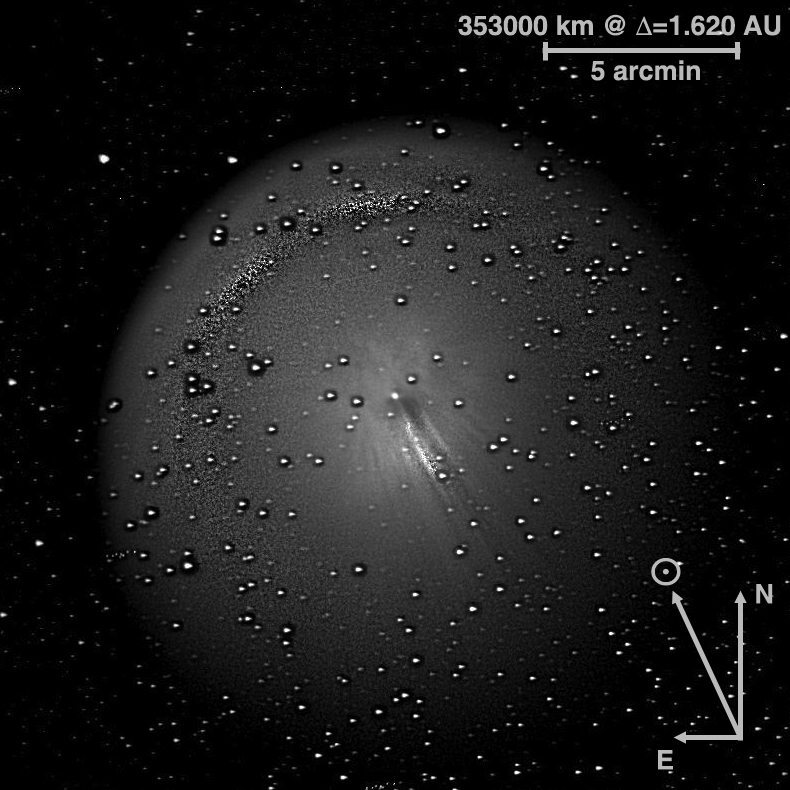
Comet 17P/Holmes from Modra observatory.

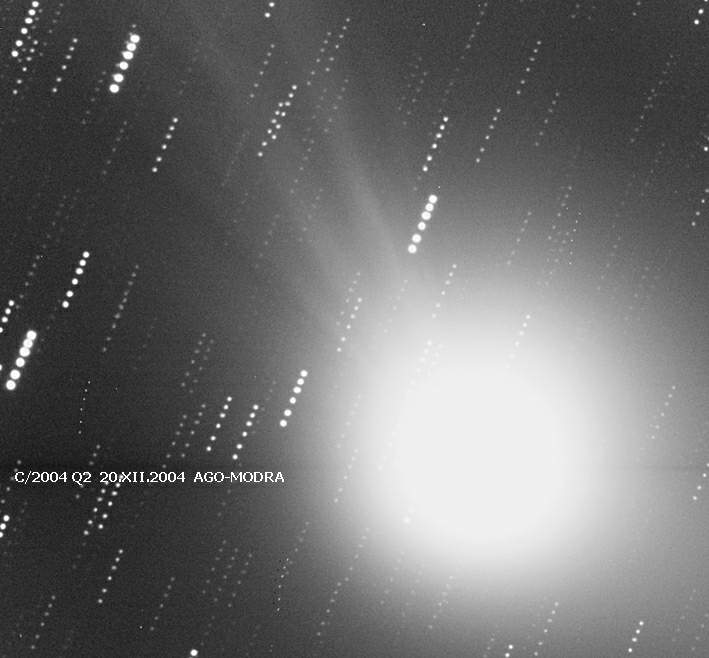
Comet C/2004 Q2 Machholz from Modra observatory.

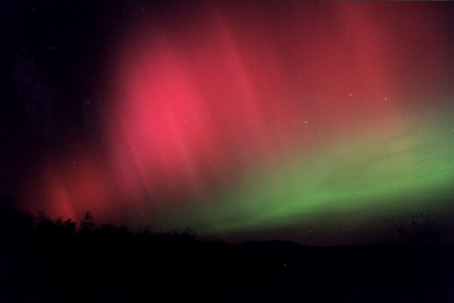
Aurora borealis from Modra observatory.

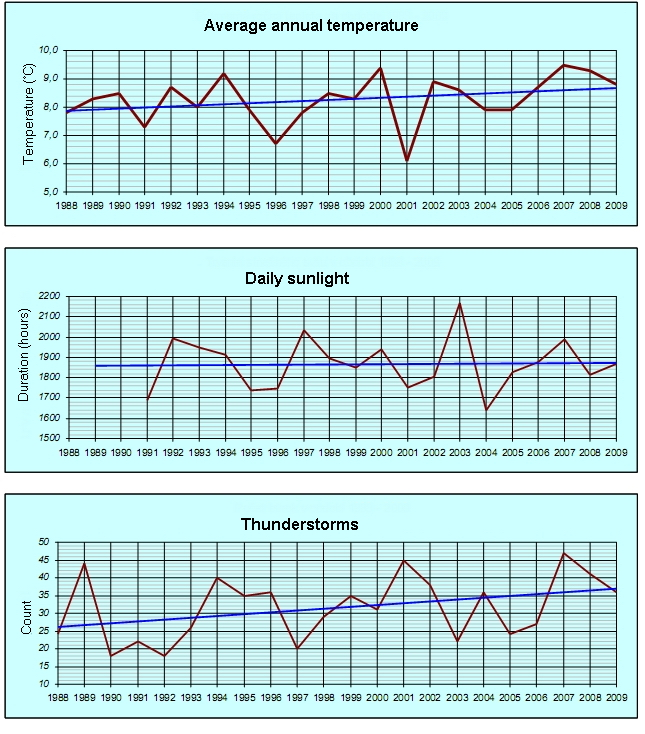
Climate record at the observatory site.

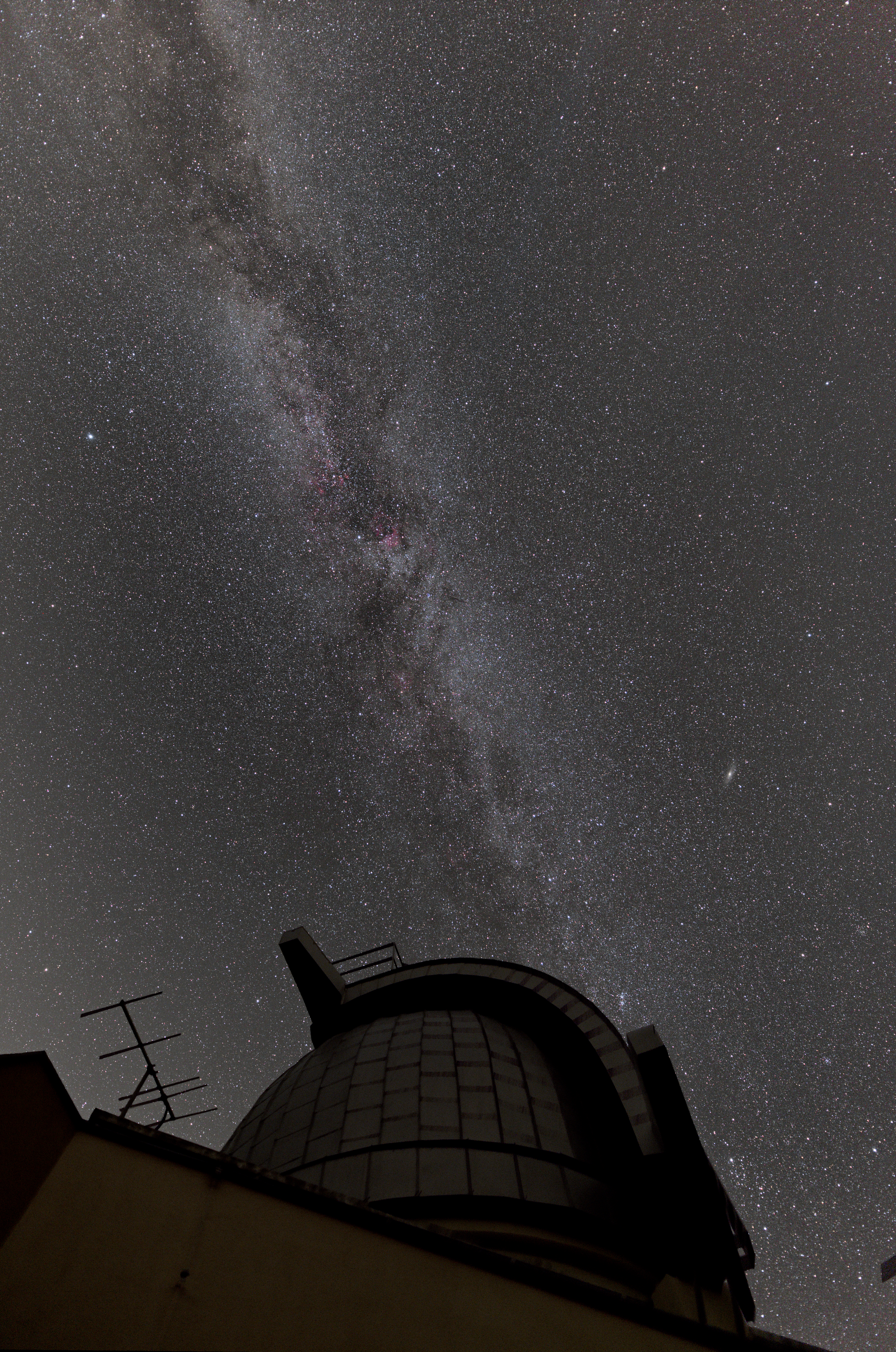
Autumn Milky Way above the main dome
