= Meanings of minor-planet names: 48001–49000 =

As minor planet discoveries are confirmed, they are given a permanent number by the IAU's Minor Planet Center (MPC), and the discoverers can then submit names for them, following the IAU's naming conventions. The list below concerns those minor planets in the specified number-range that have received names, and explains the meanings of those names.

Official naming citations of newly named small Solar System bodies are approved and published in a bulletin by IAU's Working Group for Small Bodies Nomenclature (WGSBN). Before May 2021, citations were published in MPC's Minor Planet Circulars for many decades. Recent citations can also be found on the JPL Small-Body Database (SBDB). Until his death in 2016, German astronomer Lutz D. Schmadel compiled these citations into the Dictionary of Minor Planet Names (DMP) and regularly updated the collection.

Based on Paul Herget's The Names of the Minor Planets, Schmadel also researched the unclear origin of numerous asteroids, most of which had been named prior to World War II. This article incorporates text from this source, which is in the public domain: SBDB New namings may only be added to this list below after official publication as the preannouncement of names is condemned. The WGSBN publishes a comprehensive guideline for the naming rules of non-cometary small Solar System bodies.

== 48001–48100 ==
Named minor planet	Provisional	This minor planet was named for...	Ref; Catalog
48047 Houghten	2001 DL_{86}	Christopher Houghten (born 1963), from Rutland, Vermont, who developed a non-computer-based system to allow manually operated telescopes to be GOTO telescopes	JPL · 48047
48070 Zizza	2001 FB_{4}	Frank Zizza, American associate professor of mathematics at the University of Arizona South and past president of the Huachuca Astronomy Club. He is credited with originating the idea of establishing an astronomical observatory on the university's campus in Sierra Vista.	MPC · 48070

== 48101–48200 ==
back to top

Named minor planet	Provisional	This minor planet was named for...	Ref; Catalog
48159 Saint-Véran	2001 HY	Saint-Véran, the highest village in France, where the Observatoire de Saint-Véran is located	JPL · 48159
48171 Juza	2001 HZ_{15}	Karel Juza (1952–1994) was a Czech stellar astronomer who worked at the observatories in Valašské Meziříčí, Tatranská Lomnica, Skalnaté Pleso and Ondřejov. His studies concentrated on the eclipsing binary AR Aur and Be-stars. He died prematurely, just before finishing his Ph.D. thesis.	JPL · 48171
48200 Nishiokatakashi	2001 KU_{1}	Takashi Nishioka (born 1936) contributed to the promotion and development of Japan's aerospace industry, such as leading the domestic production of commercial aircraft and initiating the privatization of rocket launch services. He is the chairman of the Japan Space Forum.	IAU · 48200

== 48201–48300 ==
back to top

Named minor planet	Provisional	This minor planet was named for...	Ref; Catalog
48268 Comitini	2002 AK_{1}	Comitini, small Italian municipality in Sicily which was famous in the 19th century for its sulfur mines.	IAU · 48268
48290 Idastraus	2002 JH	Ida Straus (1849–1912), born Rosalie Ida Blun, was the wife of Isidor Straus. She refused to leave her husband during the sinking of the RMS Titanic and remained with him until the end.	IAU · 48290
48291 Isidorstraus	2002 JQ_{1}	Isidor Straus (1845–1912) was a German-born American businessman, co-owner of Macy’s department store, and former U.S. congressman. During the sinking of the RMS Titanic, he reportedly refused a lifeboat place while women and children were still aboard, and died with his wife Ida.	IAU · 48291
48295 Liamgroah	2002 KW_{6}	Liam Groah (born 2005) is the grandson of NEAT Principal Investigator Raymond Bambery; the object was named in honor of his 18th birthday and graduation from high school.	IAU · 48295
48300 Kronk	2002 LG_{35}	Gary W. Kronk (born 1956) is an American amateur astronomer, programmer-analyst and writer who was so inspired by comet C/1973 E1 (Kohoutek) as a teenager that he began a quest to catalogue every comet recorded in human history. Volume One (Ancient Comets to 1799) of his four-part Cometography was published in 1999.	JPL · 48300

== 48301–48400 ==
back to top

Named minor planet	Provisional	This minor planet was named for...	Ref; Catalog
48373 Gorgythion	2161 T-3	Gorgythion, from Greek mythology. He was the bastard son of Trojan king Priam, killed by an arrow shot by Teucer at Hector during the Trojan War.	JPL · 48373

== 48401–48500 ==
back to top

Named minor planet	Provisional	This minor planet was named for...	Ref; Catalog
48408 Yoshinogari	1982 VN_{2}	Yoshinogari, large moated settlement from the Yayoi period (500 BCE–300 CE) in Saga Prefecture, Japan.	JPL · 48408
48410 Kolmogorov	1985 QJ_{5}	Andrey Kolmogorov (1903–1987), a Russian academician, professor at the Moscow State University, and outstanding mathematician.	JPL · 48410
48411 Johnventre	1985 RB_{3}	John Ventre (born 1935), a teacher, friend of the discoverer, meteorite expert, and Cincinnati Observatory Center historian	JPL · 48411
48415 Dehio	1987 QT	Georg Dehio (1850–1932), German art historian who published the fundamental works The Church Architecture of the Occident (1884–1901), Handbook of the Monuments of German Art (1900–1912) and History of the German Arts (1919–1926). The handbook Dehio became a guide essential to amateurs.	JPL · 48415
48416 Carmelita	1988 BM_{2}	Carmelita Miranda (born 1950), American astronomy popularizer who developed a love of astronomy while sailing the Pacific. She focused this passion into writing and presenting night-sky programs to over 25~000 children using a portable planetarium. She also demonstrated solar observations.	JPL · 48416
48422 Schrade	1988 VN_{7}	Hugo Schrade (1900–1974), German optical engineer, employed by the firm Carl Zeiss Jena from 1929, became the highly esteemed head works manager during 1945–1966.	JPL · 48422
48424 Souchay	1988 XW_{4}	Jean Souchay (born 1959), French astronomer, uncredited co-discoverer	JPL · 48424
48425 Tischendorf	1989 CB_{6}	Constantin von Tischendorf (1815–1874), German theologian, discoverer of the 4th-century Codex Sinaiticus	JPL · 48425
48433 Onishi	1989 US_{1}	Toshikazu Onishi, Japanese astronomer.	IAU · 48433
48434 Maxbeckmann	1989 UN_{7}	Max Beckmann, German-American painter and printmaker	JPL · 48434
48435 Jaspers	1989 UR_{7}	Karl Jaspers, German-Swiss philosopher, physician, and political thinker language	JPL · 48435
48447 Hingley	1990 TK_{2}	Peter D. Hingley (1951–2012), Librarian of the Royal Astronomical Society.	JPL · 48447
48448 Tokuda	1990 WR_{2}	Kazuki Tokuda, Japanese astronomer.	IAU · 48433
48451 Pichincha	1991 PC_{3}	Pichincha is an active stratovolcano in Ecuador, very close to the capital Quito	JPL · 48451
48456 Wilhelmwien	1991 RG_{3}	Wilhelm Wien, German physicist and Nobelist	JPL · 48456
48457 Joseffried	1991 RO_{3}	Josef W. Fried (born 1948), a German astronomer at the Heidelberg Max-Planck-Institut für Astronomie.	JPL · 48457
48458 Merian	1991 RG_{5}	Matthäus Merian, 17th-century Swiss engraver, etcher and book dealer	MPC · 48458
48461 Sabrinamaricia	1991 RN_{6}	Sabrina Maricia Cohen (born 2005), daughter of American co-discoverer Seth M. Cohen. They have enjoyed many Palomar College planetarium visits together and now she can be part of the show.	JPL · 48461
48470 Wedemeyer	1991 TC_{2}	Carrie Wedemeyer, American teacher.	IAU · 48470
48471 Orchiston	1991 TV_{2}	New Zealander Wayne Orchistron (born 1943) works as an astronomer at the National Astronomical Research Institute of Thailand. His main interests lie in the field of history of astronomy. He is the author of many books and the co-founder and editor of the Journal of Astronomical History and Heritage.	JPL · 48471
48472 Mössbauer	1991 TJ_{6}	Rudolf Ludwig Mössbauer, German physicist and Nobelist	JPL · 48472
48480 Falk	1991 YK_{1}	Johann Daniel Falk, German writer and social pedagogue, author of the Christmas carol O du fröhliche	JPL · 48480
48482 Oruki	1992 CN	"Oruki", word in the Tosa (Kōchi Prefecture) dialect of Japanese, meaning "the importance of one's presence and reassurance of unflagging support"	JPL · 48482
48492 Utewielen	1992 SS_{17}	Ute Wielen (born 1934) has worked in astronomy for more than 50 years. She was an assistant observer at the Babelsberg Observatory. She later worked as a programmer at astronomical institutes in Berlin and Heidelberg, and is the coauthor of many books on the history of astronomy.	JPL · 48492
48495 Ryugado	1993 BB	Ryugado, Kōchi Prefecture, a Japanese limestone cave	JPL · 48495
48498 Murahashi	1993 BS_{6}	Hisanori Murahashi, official of the Meiji government, when Japan aimed to become a modern nation.	IAU · 48498

== 48501–48600 ==
back to top

Named minor planet	Provisional	This minor planet was named for...	Ref; Catalog
48529 von Wrangel	1993 OV_{10}	Baron Ferdinand von Wrange (1797–1870), a Baltic German explorer and one of the founders of the Russian Geographic Society. He studied glaciology, geomagnetics and climatology. Noticing swarms of birds flying northward from near the Kolyma river, he correctly deduced that there must be an island in the Arctic Ocean.	MPC · 48529
48575 Hawaii	1994 NN	Hawaii, the Aloha State, was first visited by Polynesians from Tahiti, rediscovered by James Cook, and in 1959 became the fiftieth U.S. state. Hawaii became a sister state of Ehime prefecture	JPL · 48575
48588 Raschröder	1994 RP_{11}	Rudolf Alexander Schröder (1878–1962), German architect, poet, essayist, and translator. The complete edition of his work contains eight volumes, including numerous collections of verse. He revived the Protestant chorale and is cofounder of the "Insel-Verlag".	JPL · 48588
48590 Asaiayumi	1994 TY_{2}	Ayumi Asai, Japanese astrophysicist and associate professor of solar physics at Kyoto University.	IAU · 48590
48591 Shimajiri	1994 TB_{3}	Yoshito Shimajiri, Japanese astronomer and professor at Kyushu Kyoritsu University.	IAU · 48591

== 48601–48700 ==
back to top

Named minor planet	Provisional	This minor planet was named for...	Ref; Catalog
48607 Yamagatatemodai	1995 DS_{2}	Yamagata Tenmondai (Yamagata Astronomical Observatory), was established for educational purposes by the Yamagata University in 2003, using a 0.15-m refractor and a 3D astronomy theater.	JPL · 48607
48616 Yeminghan	1995 GP_{7}	Ye Minghan (1925–2024), Chinese experimental high-energy physicist, particle-detection technology expert, and Acamedician of Chinese Academy of Engineering.	JPL · 48616
48619 Jianli	1995 KV	Jianli County, located in the south of Jianghan plain, has a long history and splendid culture, including many relics from the period of the Three Kingdoms of China.	JPL · 48619
48624 Sadayuki	1995 PM	Sadayuki Okuni, Japanese high-school teacher with an interest in astronomy, nephew of the discoverer	JPL · 48624
48628 Janetfender	1995 RD	Janet Fender, American chief scientist of the Space Vehicles Directorate of the AFRL, who instigated AMOS support for the NEAT program	JPL · 48628
48631 Hasantufan	1995 SK_{29}	Hasan Tufan, Tatar poet	JPL · 48631
48635 Murata	1995 SU_{52}	Takuya Murata, Japanese solar physicist.	IAU · 48635
48636 Huangkun	1995 SS_{53}	Kun Huang, academician of the Chinese Academy of Sciences	JPL · 48636
48638 Třebíč	1995 TB	Třebíč, a town in Moravia, is known mainly for the Basilica of St. Procopius built in the early 13th century and the old Jewish Quarter.	JPL · 48638
48640 Eziobosso	1995 UD	Ezio Bosso (born 1971), an Italian pianist, director and composer of classical music.	JPL · 48640
48643 Allen-Beach	1995 UA_{2}	Bill Allen (born 1947) and Sally Beach (born 1950), American publishers of the Asteroid/Comet Connection (A/CC) † ‡	MPC · 48643
48650 Kazanuniversity	1995 UX_{48}	Kazan University, one of the oldest universities in Russia	JPL · 48650
48680 Kamijo	1996 BU	Masuki Kamijo, Japanese astronomy enthusiast.	IAU · 48680
48681 Zeilinger	1996 BZ	Anton Zeilinger (born 1945), Austrian professor of physics. He is a much-honored professor of experimental physics in Innsbruck and Vienna, decorated by the "pour le mérite" for sciences and arts. Well known for his contributions to quantum physics, in 1997 he succeeded in the first teleportation of information on quantum level.	JPL · 48681
48686 Kashimura	1996 EM_{1}	Nobuya Kashimura, Japanese amateur astronomer who volunteers primarily at the Kurobe Yoshida Science Museum in Kurobe City, Toyama Prefecture.	IAU · 48680
48700 Hanggao	1996 HZ_{21}	The Hangzhou High School that has made an outstanding contribution to national education since its foundation in 1889 in Hangzhou, Zhejiang province, China	JPL · 48700

== 48701–48800 ==
back to top

Named minor planet	Provisional	This minor planet was named for...	Ref; Catalog
48715 Balbinot	1996 RP_{2}	Roberto Balbinot (born 1956) is an Italian theoretical physicist who teaches General Relativity at the Bologna University. His fields of research include acoustic black holes, quantum gravity, and field and string theories.	JPL · 48715
48720 Enricomentana	1996 SD_{7}	Enrico Mentana (born 1955) is an Italian journalist and director of Italian TV video news.	JPL · 48720
48736 Ehime	1997 DL	Ehime prefecture, Japan, the discovery site, sister state of Hawaii	JPL · 48736
48737 Cusinato	1997 ER_{11}	Piergiorgio Cusinato, Italian antique dealer and amateur astronomer	JPL · 48737
48739 Kandachiyoko	1997 EV_{17}	Chiyoko Kanda, Japanese astronomy enthusiast who worked for 41 years at the company that publishes the famous astronomy magazine Hoshi no Techo (Star Notebook).	IAU · 48739
48748 Kondoshusaku	1997 GV_{3}	Shusaku Kondo has served as the Chief Curator of Astronomy at the Toyama Science Museum in Toyama City, Japan, since 2018.	IAU · 48748
48756 Yoshiharukuni	1997 GO_{28}	Yoshiharu Okuni (born 1970), the eldest son of Japanese amateur astronomer Tomimaru Okuni, who discovered this minor planet.	IAU · 48756
48767 Skamander	1997 JG_{15}	Scamander (Skamandros), a son of Zeus, fought on the side of the Trojans in the Trojan War and tried to kill Achilles three times.	JPL · 48767
48773 Davidrowe	1997 PS	David Rowe (b. 1954), an American electronics, optical and mechanical engineer.	IAU · 48773
48774 Anngower	1997 PO_{2}	Ann C. Gower, a Canadian radio-astronomer and associate professor of astronomy at the University of Victoria. She is a gifted teacher who takes a special interest in every student in her classes, and an active member of the UVic Speakers Bureau, sharing with others her knowledge of galaxies and quasars.	JPL · 48774
48778 Shokoyukako	1997 RE	Shoko and Yukako Abe, the discoverer's daughters	JPL · 48778
48779 Mariko	1997 RH	Mariko Hamada (born 1964), a musician from Matsue-shi, Shimane-ken, Japan.	JPL · 48779
48782 Fierz	1997 SP	Olga Fierz, Swiss teacher who dedicated all her life to the custody of children in difficult life situations	JPL · 48782
48785 Pitter	1997 SA_{2}	Přemysl Pitter, Czech philanthropist and pacifist, holder of Czech, German and Israeli honors, and whose centenary was cited by UNESCO	JPL · 48785
48794 Stolzová	1997 TY_{8}	Tereza Stolzová (1834–1902), was a Czech coloratura soprano and soloist for the Teatro la Scala in Milano. She belongs among the greatest singers of Verdi's works in the nineteenth century and created the title role on the European first night of Aida in 1872.	MPC · 48794
48798 Penghuanwu	1997 TS_{18}	Peng Huanwu, Chinese theoretical physicist	JPL · 48798
48799 Tashikuergan	1997 TX_{18}	Tashikuergan (meaning "Stone City") is an ancient city along the Silk Road at the western end in China. It is located on Pamir Plateau on the northern side of Kashi area, Xinjiang province, and it has been the only Tajik Autonomous County since 1954.	JPL · 48799

== 48801–48900 ==
back to top

Named minor planet	Provisional	This minor planet was named for...	Ref; Catalog
48801 Penninger	1997 UC_{1}	Josef Penninger (born 1964), Austrian director of the Institute of Molecular Biotechnology of the Austrian Academy of Sciences, has been honored by various university chairs and numerous awards. He was chosen by the magazine Esquire as one of the ten most interesting people of the year 2000.	JPL · 48801
48807 Takahata	1997 UT_{21}	Takahata, Yamagata prefecture, Japan	JPL · 48807
48838 Markackermann	1998 AF_{10}	Mark Ackermann (b. 1959), an American optical designer.	IAU · 48838
48842 Alexmazzanti	1998 BA_{44}	Alessandro Mazzanti (born 1964), an Italian amateur astronomer and observer of near-Earth objects as well as the president of the astronomy club at Montelupo (Italian: Gruppo Astrofili Montelupo) since 2020.	IAU · 48842
48844 Belloves	1998 DW	Belloves or Bellovesus (c.a. 400 BC), was a Celtic prince and the first known Celt in the history of northern Italy mentioned by Livy.	MPC · 48844
48846 Agnèsacker	1998 DC_{14}	Agnès Acker (born 1940) is a French astrophysicist whose research focuses on planetary nebulae, binarity of nuclei and stellar winds. She is professor emeritus of the University of Strasbourg and founder of the Strasbourg Planetarium, which she directed for 22 years.	IAU · 48846
48886 Jonanderson	1998 JA_{4}	Jon Anderson (born 1944) is one of the founders of the progressive rock band Yes. He has also recorded many solo albums and collaborated with many musicians, including Vangelis and Mike Oldfield. His alto tenor voice is one of the most recognizable in the prog rock scene.	IAU · 48886
48888 REXIS	1998 KR_{6}	REXIS, the Regolith X-ray Imaging Spectrometer aboard the OSIRIS-REx spacecraft, is the result of the work of over 100 students at the Massachusetts Institute of Technology and Harvard University who conceived, designed, implemented, and operated it at the asteroid (101955) Bennu.	IAU · 48888

== 48901–49000 ==
back to top

Named minor planet	Provisional	This minor planet was named for...	Ref; Catalog
48909 Laurake	1998 MK_{40}	Laura ("Laurake") De Maeyer, daughter of Belgian psychologist Myriam Kerkhofs and Flemish sculptor Elmer De Maeyer	JPL · 48909
48915 Patbrandebourg	1998 OJ_{5}	Patrick Brandebourg (b. 1957), a French amateur astronomer.	IAU · 48915
48934 Kočanová	1998 QS	Mária Kočanová (1890–1976) was a Slovak writer, novelist and dramatist. She drew themes from contemporary life, European and world history or Bible stories. Her manuscripts are kept in a museum in Prešov.	JPL · 48934
48960 Clouet	1998 QR_{26}	Bernard Clouet, general secretary of the Société astronomique de France (French Astronomical Society) and an observer of double stars	JPL · 48960

back to top

Preceded by 47,001–48,000	Meanings of minor-planet names List of minor planets: 48,001–49,000	Succeeded by 49,001–50,000
