= List of minor planets: 48001–49000 =

The following is a partial list of minor planets, running from minor-planet number 48001 through 49000, inclusive. The primary data for this and other partial lists is based on JPL's "Small-Body Orbital Elements" and data available from the Minor Planet Center. Critical list information is also provided by the MPC, unless otherwise specified from Lowell Observatory. A detailed description of the table's columns and additional sources are given on the main page including a complete list of every page in this series, and a statistical break-up on the dynamical classification of minor planets.

Also see the summary list of all named bodies in numerical and alphabetical order, and the corresponding naming citations for the number range of this particular list. New namings may only be added to this list after official publication, as the preannouncement of names is condemned by the Working Group for Small Bodies Nomenclature of the International Astronomical Union.

Near-Earth obj.	MBA (inner)	MBA (outer)	Centaur
Mars-crosser	MBA (middle)	Jupiter trojan	Trans-Neptunian obj.
Unclassified

== 48001–48100 ==
Designation			Discovery			Properties		Ref
Permanent	Provisional	Named after	Date	Site	Discoverer(s)	Category	Diam.	Ref
48001	2001 BZ_{41}	—	January 24, 2001	Socorro	LINEAR	H	1.7 km	MPC · JPL
48002	2001 BN_{44}	—	January 19, 2001	Socorro	LINEAR	NYS	2.8 km	MPC · JPL
48003	2001 BZ_{49}	—	January 21, 2001	Socorro	LINEAR	·	7.7 km	MPC · JPL
48004	2001 BS_{61}	—	January 31, 2001	Desert Beaver	W. K. Y. Yeung	NYS	3.2 km	MPC · JPL
48005	2001 BM_{66}	—	January 26, 2001	Socorro	LINEAR	·	3.2 km	MPC · JPL
48006	2001 BF_{67}	—	January 30, 2001	Socorro	LINEAR	slow	2.0 km	MPC · JPL
48007	2001 BH_{67}	—	January 30, 2001	Socorro	LINEAR	PHO	6.7 km	MPC · JPL
48008	2001 BX_{67}	—	January 31, 2001	Socorro	LINEAR	·	2.6 km	MPC · JPL
48009	2001 BK_{69}	—	January 31, 2001	Socorro	LINEAR	NYS	2.8 km	MPC · JPL
48010	2001 BD_{70}	—	January 31, 2001	Socorro	LINEAR	·	4.3 km	MPC · JPL
48011	2001 BQ_{73}	—	January 29, 2001	Haleakala	NEAT	·	2.6 km	MPC · JPL
48012	2001 BV_{77}	—	January 25, 2001	Kitt Peak	Spacewatch	·	5.6 km	MPC · JPL
48013	2001 CB_{1}	—	February 1, 2001	Socorro	LINEAR	·	2.6 km	MPC · JPL
48014	2001 CS_{6}	—	February 1, 2001	Socorro	LINEAR	·	1.8 km	MPC · JPL
48015	2001 CQ_{8}	—	February 1, 2001	Socorro	LINEAR	·	3.0 km	MPC · JPL
48016	2001 CQ_{9}	—	February 1, 2001	Socorro	LINEAR	PHO	3.5 km	MPC · JPL
48017	2001 CW_{16}	—	February 1, 2001	Socorro	LINEAR	(5)	3.0 km	MPC · JPL
48018	2001 CB_{36}	—	February 15, 2001	Črni Vrh	Skvarč, J.	·	4.1 km	MPC · JPL
48019	2001 CD_{43}	—	February 15, 2001	Socorro	LINEAR	·	3.8 km	MPC · JPL
48020	2001 DC	—	February 16, 2001	Črni Vrh	Mikuž, H.	·	1.4 km	MPC · JPL
48021	2001 DN_{6}	—	February 16, 2001	Višnjan Observatory	K. Korlević	(2076)	2.7 km	MPC · JPL
48022	2001 DJ_{7}	—	February 16, 2001	Oizumi	T. Kobayashi	(5)	3.0 km	MPC · JPL
48023	2001 DL_{7}	—	February 16, 2001	Oizumi	T. Kobayashi	·	2.4 km	MPC · JPL
48024	2001 DJ_{17}	—	February 16, 2001	Socorro	LINEAR	·	3.6 km	MPC · JPL
48025	2001 DS_{17}	—	February 16, 2001	Socorro	LINEAR	·	4.0 km	MPC · JPL
48026	2001 DN_{24}	—	February 17, 2001	Socorro	LINEAR	V	1.3 km	MPC · JPL
48027	2001 DG_{29}	—	February 17, 2001	Socorro	LINEAR	·	2.7 km	MPC · JPL
48028	2001 DX_{31}	—	February 17, 2001	Socorro	LINEAR	NYS	3.3 km	MPC · JPL
48029	2001 DS_{37}	—	February 19, 2001	Socorro	LINEAR	·	2.4 km	MPC · JPL
48030	2001 DH_{39}	—	February 19, 2001	Socorro	LINEAR	·	1.5 km	MPC · JPL
48031	2001 DL_{39}	—	February 19, 2001	Socorro	LINEAR	·	1.4 km	MPC · JPL
48032	2001 DX_{42}	—	February 19, 2001	Socorro	LINEAR	·	2.0 km	MPC · JPL
48033	2001 DJ_{44}	—	February 19, 2001	Socorro	LINEAR	·	2.4 km	MPC · JPL
48034	2001 DM_{53}	—	February 19, 2001	Socorro	LINEAR	MAS	1.9 km	MPC · JPL
48035	2001 DM_{67}	—	February 19, 2001	Socorro	LINEAR	NYS	2.4 km	MPC · JPL
48036	2001 DA_{68}	—	February 19, 2001	Socorro	LINEAR	·	2.3 km	MPC · JPL
48037	2001 DE_{68}	—	February 19, 2001	Socorro	LINEAR	·	2.6 km	MPC · JPL
48038	2001 DC_{69}	—	February 19, 2001	Socorro	LINEAR	·	7.0 km	MPC · JPL
48039	2001 DT_{69}	—	February 19, 2001	Socorro	LINEAR	·	3.3 km	MPC · JPL
48040	2001 DL_{70}	—	February 19, 2001	Socorro	LINEAR	NYS	3.2 km	MPC · JPL
48041	2001 DE_{71}	—	February 19, 2001	Socorro	LINEAR	V	1.8 km	MPC · JPL
48042	2001 DO_{71}	—	February 19, 2001	Socorro	LINEAR	·	4.0 km	MPC · JPL
48043	2001 DF_{74}	—	February 19, 2001	Socorro	LINEAR	V	1.9 km	MPC · JPL
48044	2001 DZ_{74}	—	February 19, 2001	Socorro	LINEAR	·	6.7 km	MPC · JPL
48045	2001 DD_{81}	—	February 26, 2001	Oizumi	T. Kobayashi	(2076)	1.6 km	MPC · JPL
48046	2001 DO_{83}	—	February 23, 2001	Kitt Peak	Spacewatch	·	4.6 km	MPC · JPL
48047 Houghten	2001 DL_{86}	Houghten	February 22, 2001	Nogales	Tenagra II	·	1.9 km	MPC · JPL
48048	2001 DG_{88}	—	February 24, 2001	Haleakala	NEAT	·	6.7 km	MPC · JPL
48049	2001 DB_{90}	—	February 22, 2001	Socorro	LINEAR	·	3.4 km	MPC · JPL
48050	2001 DK_{92}	—	February 20, 2001	Haleakala	NEAT	·	5.7 km	MPC · JPL
48051	2001 DV_{93}	—	February 19, 2001	Socorro	LINEAR	·	1.5 km	MPC · JPL
48052	2001 DZ_{98}	—	February 17, 2001	Socorro	LINEAR	·	3.2 km	MPC · JPL
48053	2001 EL	—	March 2, 2001	Desert Beaver	W. K. Y. Yeung	·	6.2 km	MPC · JPL
48054	2001 EM	—	March 2, 2001	Desert Beaver	W. K. Y. Yeung	·	3.3 km	MPC · JPL
48055	2001 EQ_{3}	—	March 2, 2001	Anderson Mesa	LONEOS	·	1.7 km	MPC · JPL
48056	2001 EF_{4}	—	March 2, 2001	Anderson Mesa	LONEOS	·	3.2 km	MPC · JPL
48057	2001 EO_{5}	—	March 2, 2001	Anderson Mesa	LONEOS	·	2.0 km	MPC · JPL
48058	2001 EE_{7}	—	March 2, 2001	Anderson Mesa	LONEOS	·	2.0 km	MPC · JPL
48059	2001 ET_{7}	—	March 2, 2001	Anderson Mesa	LONEOS	·	2.6 km	MPC · JPL
48060	2001 EY_{7}	—	March 2, 2001	Anderson Mesa	LONEOS	·	2.0 km	MPC · JPL
48061	2001 EZ_{7}	—	March 2, 2001	Anderson Mesa	LONEOS	·	2.6 km	MPC · JPL
48062	2001 EK_{8}	—	March 2, 2001	Anderson Mesa	LONEOS	·	2.3 km	MPC · JPL
48063	2001 EP_{9}	—	March 2, 2001	Anderson Mesa	LONEOS	·	1.9 km	MPC · JPL
48064	2001 EL_{16}	—	March 15, 2001	Haleakala	NEAT	·	2.5 km	MPC · JPL
48065	2001 EK_{17}	—	March 15, 2001	Socorro	LINEAR	·	8.1 km	MPC · JPL
48066	2001 EH_{20}	—	March 15, 2001	Anderson Mesa	LONEOS	NYS	2.4 km	MPC · JPL
48067	2001 EF_{21}	—	March 15, 2001	Anderson Mesa	LONEOS	·	1.5 km	MPC · JPL
48068	2001 EU_{26}	—	March 2, 2001	Anderson Mesa	LONEOS	·	2.8 km	MPC · JPL
48069	2001 FP	—	March 16, 2001	Socorro	LINEAR	·	5.5 km	MPC · JPL
48070 Zizza	2001 FB_{4}	Zizza	March 19, 2001	Junk Bond	D. Healy	·	9.1 km	MPC · JPL
48071	2001 FV_{5}	—	March 18, 2001	Socorro	LINEAR	PHO	4.2 km	MPC · JPL
48072	2001 FB_{11}	—	March 19, 2001	Anderson Mesa	LONEOS	·	3.9 km	MPC · JPL
48073	2001 FC_{13}	—	March 19, 2001	Anderson Mesa	LONEOS	V	2.2 km	MPC · JPL
48074	2001 FC_{15}	—	March 19, 2001	Anderson Mesa	LONEOS	·	2.1 km	MPC · JPL
48075	2001 FY_{15}	—	March 19, 2001	Anderson Mesa	LONEOS	·	2.3 km	MPC · JPL
48076	2001 FZ_{17}	—	March 19, 2001	Anderson Mesa	LONEOS	·	1.9 km	MPC · JPL
48077	2001 FX_{24}	—	March 17, 2001	Socorro	LINEAR	·	2.0 km	MPC · JPL
48078	2001 FQ_{25}	—	March 18, 2001	Socorro	LINEAR	·	5.0 km	MPC · JPL
48079	2001 FQ_{33}	—	March 18, 2001	Socorro	LINEAR	·	2.2 km	MPC · JPL
48080	2001 FF_{34}	—	March 18, 2001	Socorro	LINEAR	·	4.0 km	MPC · JPL
48081	2001 FJ_{35}	—	March 18, 2001	Socorro	LINEAR	·	4.2 km	MPC · JPL
48082	2001 FT_{35}	—	March 18, 2001	Socorro	LINEAR	V	1.8 km	MPC · JPL
48083	2001 FO_{36}	—	March 18, 2001	Socorro	LINEAR	NYS	2.3 km	MPC · JPL
48084	2001 FV_{37}	—	March 18, 2001	Socorro	LINEAR	·	5.1 km	MPC · JPL
48085	2001 FU_{41}	—	March 18, 2001	Socorro	LINEAR	·	3.7 km	MPC · JPL
48086	2001 FV_{41}	—	March 18, 2001	Socorro	LINEAR	·	2.1 km	MPC · JPL
48087	2001 FZ_{41}	—	March 18, 2001	Socorro	LINEAR	·	2.5 km	MPC · JPL
48088	2001 FG_{42}	—	March 18, 2001	Socorro	LINEAR	·	3.0 km	MPC · JPL
48089	2001 FH_{42}	—	March 18, 2001	Socorro	LINEAR	·	4.9 km	MPC · JPL
48090	2001 FK_{42}	—	March 18, 2001	Socorro	LINEAR	·	3.3 km	MPC · JPL
48091	2001 FT_{44}	—	March 18, 2001	Socorro	LINEAR	V	1.9 km	MPC · JPL
48092	2001 FL_{45}	—	March 18, 2001	Socorro	LINEAR	·	2.8 km	MPC · JPL
48093	2001 FR_{46}	—	March 18, 2001	Socorro	LINEAR	·	5.3 km	MPC · JPL
48094	2001 FX_{47}	—	March 18, 2001	Socorro	LINEAR	V	1.8 km	MPC · JPL
48095	2001 FZ_{50}	—	March 18, 2001	Socorro	LINEAR	·	3.4 km	MPC · JPL
48096	2001 FP_{51}	—	March 18, 2001	Socorro	LINEAR	·	2.6 km	MPC · JPL
48097	2001 FW_{52}	—	March 18, 2001	Socorro	LINEAR	·	2.9 km	MPC · JPL
48098	2001 FL_{54}	—	March 18, 2001	Socorro	LINEAR	·	9.7 km	MPC · JPL
48099	2001 FT_{57}	—	March 19, 2001	Socorro	LINEAR	·	7.7 km	MPC · JPL
48100	2001 FW_{57}	—	March 21, 2001	Socorro	LINEAR	·	3.3 km	MPC · JPL

== 48101–48200 ==
back to top

Designation			Discovery			Properties		Ref
Permanent	Provisional	Named after	Date	Site	Discoverer(s)	Category	Diam.	Ref
48101	2001 FB_{61}	—	March 19, 2001	Socorro	LINEAR	NYS	2.4 km	MPC · JPL
48102	2001 FH_{64}	—	March 19, 2001	Socorro	LINEAR	V	2.3 km	MPC · JPL
48103	2001 FP_{66}	—	March 19, 2001	Socorro	LINEAR	·	1.7 km	MPC · JPL
48104	2001 FN_{68}	—	March 19, 2001	Socorro	LINEAR	·	4.3 km	MPC · JPL
48105	2001 FR_{70}	—	March 19, 2001	Socorro	LINEAR	·	3.3 km	MPC · JPL
48106	2001 FV_{70}	—	March 19, 2001	Socorro	LINEAR	·	3.5 km	MPC · JPL
48107	2001 FZ_{70}	—	March 19, 2001	Socorro	LINEAR	·	2.9 km	MPC · JPL
48108	2001 FG_{71}	—	March 19, 2001	Socorro	LINEAR	·	3.5 km	MPC · JPL
48109	2001 FV_{72}	—	March 19, 2001	Socorro	LINEAR	·	3.7 km	MPC · JPL
48110	2001 FX_{72}	—	March 19, 2001	Socorro	LINEAR	·	2.8 km	MPC · JPL
48111	2001 FT_{74}	—	March 19, 2001	Socorro	LINEAR	·	3.4 km	MPC · JPL
48112	2001 FV_{74}	—	March 19, 2001	Socorro	LINEAR	V	1.9 km	MPC · JPL
48113	2001 FJ_{77}	—	March 19, 2001	Socorro	LINEAR	·	3.4 km	MPC · JPL
48114	2001 FW_{77}	—	March 19, 2001	Socorro	LINEAR	·	2.3 km	MPC · JPL
48115	2001 FF_{83}	—	March 24, 2001	Socorro	LINEAR	·	3.5 km	MPC · JPL
48116	2001 FK_{90}	—	March 24, 2001	Socorro	LINEAR	V	1.8 km	MPC · JPL
48117	2001 FL_{90}	—	March 24, 2001	Socorro	LINEAR	·	2.6 km	MPC · JPL
48118	2001 FX_{95}	—	March 16, 2001	Socorro	LINEAR	·	3.7 km	MPC · JPL
48119	2001 FK_{97}	—	March 16, 2001	Socorro	LINEAR	MAR	2.8 km	MPC · JPL
48120	2001 FT_{97}	—	March 16, 2001	Socorro	LINEAR	V	1.9 km	MPC · JPL
48121	2001 FE_{99}	—	March 16, 2001	Socorro	LINEAR	PHO	3.5 km	MPC · JPL
48122	2001 FQ_{100}	—	March 28, 2001	Socorro	LINEAR	·	4.8 km	MPC · JPL
48123	2001 FP_{101}	—	March 17, 2001	Socorro	LINEAR	·	2.3 km	MPC · JPL
48124	2001 FZ_{101}	—	March 17, 2001	Socorro	LINEAR	·	2.6 km	MPC · JPL
48125	2001 FK_{105}	—	March 18, 2001	Socorro	LINEAR	MAS	2.3 km	MPC · JPL
48126	2001 FS_{105}	—	March 18, 2001	Socorro	LINEAR	·	1.8 km	MPC · JPL
48127	2001 FX_{105}	—	March 18, 2001	Anderson Mesa	LONEOS	·	6.5 km	MPC · JPL
48128	2001 FU_{107}	—	March 18, 2001	Anderson Mesa	LONEOS	·	3.3 km	MPC · JPL
48129	2001 FF_{112}	—	March 18, 2001	Socorro	LINEAR	·	3.6 km	MPC · JPL
48130	2001 FF_{119}	—	March 20, 2001	Haleakala	NEAT	EUN	4.1 km	MPC · JPL
48131	2001 FK_{119}	—	March 20, 2001	Haleakala	NEAT	·	5.5 km	MPC · JPL
48132	2001 FA_{122}	—	March 29, 2001	Desert Beaver	W. K. Y. Yeung	ADE	7.9 km	MPC · JPL
48133	2001 FV_{126}	—	March 26, 2001	Socorro	LINEAR	·	3.0 km	MPC · JPL
48134	2001 FD_{127}	—	March 29, 2001	Socorro	LINEAR	V	2.0 km	MPC · JPL
48135	2001 FC_{128}	—	March 31, 2001	Desert Beaver	W. K. Y. Yeung	THM	7.8 km	MPC · JPL
48136	2001 FO_{141}	—	March 23, 2001	Anderson Mesa	LONEOS	·	3.0 km	MPC · JPL
48137	2001 FS_{143}	—	March 23, 2001	Anderson Mesa	LONEOS	·	3.8 km	MPC · JPL
48138	2001 FF_{144}	—	March 23, 2001	Anderson Mesa	LONEOS	·	2.9 km	MPC · JPL
48139	2001 FY_{144}	—	March 23, 2001	Anderson Mesa	LONEOS	·	5.3 km	MPC · JPL
48140	2001 FT_{148}	—	March 24, 2001	Anderson Mesa	LONEOS	·	4.2 km	MPC · JPL
48141	2001 FE_{150}	—	March 24, 2001	Anderson Mesa	LONEOS	slow	2.9 km	MPC · JPL
48142	2001 FG_{151}	—	March 24, 2001	Socorro	LINEAR	·	6.1 km	MPC · JPL
48143	2001 FY_{155}	—	March 26, 2001	Socorro	LINEAR	EUN	2.4 km	MPC · JPL
48144	2001 FQ_{156}	—	March 26, 2001	Haleakala	NEAT	·	2.6 km	MPC · JPL
48145	2001 FJ_{157}	—	March 27, 2001	Anderson Mesa	LONEOS	·	1.9 km	MPC · JPL
48146	2001 FR_{159}	—	March 29, 2001	Anderson Mesa	LONEOS	·	3.2 km	MPC · JPL
48147	2001 FO_{160}	—	March 29, 2001	Anderson Mesa	LONEOS	·	5.5 km	MPC · JPL
48148	2001 FF_{161}	—	March 29, 2001	Haleakala	NEAT	DOR	8.2 km	MPC · JPL
48149	2001 FX_{162}	—	March 18, 2001	Socorro	LINEAR	·	1.5 km	MPC · JPL
48150	2001 FA_{165}	—	March 18, 2001	Haleakala	NEAT	·	2.7 km	MPC · JPL
48151	2001 FJ_{169}	—	March 23, 2001	Anderson Mesa	LONEOS	·	5.8 km	MPC · JPL
48152	2001 FS_{172}	—	March 25, 2001	Anderson Mesa	LONEOS	EUN	2.9 km	MPC · JPL
48153	2001 FW_{172}	—	March 31, 2001	Kitt Peak	Spacewatch	LIX	14 km	MPC · JPL
48154	2001 GT_{3}	—	April 15, 2001	Socorro	LINEAR	·	4.4 km	MPC · JPL
48155	2001 GU_{4}	—	April 15, 2001	Socorro	LINEAR	·	8.0 km	MPC · JPL
48156	2001 GT_{5}	—	April 13, 2001	Kitt Peak	Spacewatch	·	1.5 km	MPC · JPL
48157	2001 GB_{7}	—	April 15, 2001	Socorro	LINEAR	GEF	3.2 km	MPC · JPL
48158	2001 GM_{9}	—	April 15, 2001	Socorro	LINEAR	fast	6.9 km	MPC · JPL
48159 Saint-Véran	2001 HY	Saint-Véran	April 16, 2001	Saint-Véran	St. Veran	fast	3.8 km	MPC · JPL
48160	2001 HC_{3}	—	April 17, 2001	Socorro	LINEAR	·	4.1 km	MPC · JPL
48161	2001 HM_{3}	—	April 17, 2001	Socorro	LINEAR	·	4.0 km	MPC · JPL
48162	2001 HX_{3}	—	April 17, 2001	Desert Beaver	W. K. Y. Yeung	(5)	3.1 km	MPC · JPL
48163	2001 HD_{5}	—	April 16, 2001	Socorro	LINEAR	V	2.2 km	MPC · JPL
48164	2001 HJ_{9}	—	April 16, 2001	Socorro	LINEAR	·	8.6 km	MPC · JPL
48165	2001 HH_{10}	—	April 16, 2001	Socorro	LINEAR	·	10 km	MPC · JPL
48166	2001 HT_{10}	—	April 16, 2001	Socorro	LINEAR	·	2.3 km	MPC · JPL
48167	2001 HS_{11}	—	April 18, 2001	Socorro	LINEAR	·	7.9 km	MPC · JPL
48168	2001 HC_{12}	—	April 18, 2001	Socorro	LINEAR	·	2.8 km	MPC · JPL
48169	2001 HV_{12}	—	April 18, 2001	Socorro	LINEAR	·	6.0 km	MPC · JPL
48170	2001 HP_{15}	—	April 18, 2001	Socorro	LINEAR	·	3.3 km	MPC · JPL
48171 Juza	2001 HZ_{15}	Juza	April 23, 2001	Ondřejov	P. Pravec, P. Kušnirák	·	2.2 km	MPC · JPL
48172	2001 HY_{18}	—	April 24, 2001	Kitt Peak	Spacewatch	·	3.7 km	MPC · JPL
48173	2001 HM_{19}	—	April 24, 2001	Kitt Peak	Spacewatch	(17392)	3.1 km	MPC · JPL
48174	2001 HF_{21}	—	April 23, 2001	Socorro	LINEAR	V	1.6 km	MPC · JPL
48175	2001 HB_{23}	—	April 26, 2001	Desert Beaver	W. K. Y. Yeung	·	5.0 km	MPC · JPL
48176	2001 HF_{26}	—	April 27, 2001	Kitt Peak	Spacewatch	·	2.5 km	MPC · JPL
48177	2001 HF_{27}	—	April 27, 2001	Socorro	LINEAR	·	9.4 km	MPC · JPL
48178	2001 HU_{31}	—	April 28, 2001	Desert Beaver	W. K. Y. Yeung	HNS	4.3 km	MPC · JPL
48179	2001 HY_{31}	—	April 28, 2001	Desert Beaver	W. K. Y. Yeung	·	6.8 km	MPC · JPL
48180	2001 HN_{32}	—	April 23, 2001	Socorro	LINEAR	·	5.5 km	MPC · JPL
48181	2001 HW_{32}	—	April 24, 2001	Socorro	LINEAR	·	5.3 km	MPC · JPL
48182	2001 HH_{40}	—	April 27, 2001	Socorro	LINEAR	·	7.9 km	MPC · JPL
48183	2001 HD_{41}	—	April 27, 2001	Socorro	LINEAR	·	5.9 km	MPC · JPL
48184	2001 HA_{44}	—	April 16, 2001	Anderson Mesa	LONEOS	V	1.3 km	MPC · JPL
48185	2001 HK_{44}	—	April 16, 2001	Anderson Mesa	LONEOS	PAD	2.7 km	MPC · JPL
48186	2001 HL_{45}	—	April 16, 2001	Socorro	LINEAR	·	6.3 km	MPC · JPL
48187	2001 HU_{46}	—	April 18, 2001	Socorro	LINEAR	·	4.2 km	MPC · JPL
48188	2001 HX_{48}	—	April 21, 2001	Socorro	LINEAR	EUN	2.7 km	MPC · JPL
48189	2001 HR_{49}	—	April 21, 2001	Socorro	LINEAR	·	11 km	MPC · JPL
48190	2001 HA_{53}	—	April 23, 2001	Socorro	LINEAR	·	2.2 km	MPC · JPL
48191	2001 HX_{54}	—	April 24, 2001	Socorro	LINEAR	·	2.7 km	MPC · JPL
48192	2001 HL_{57}	—	April 25, 2001	Anderson Mesa	LONEOS	·	5.9 km	MPC · JPL
48193	2001 HO_{58}	—	April 25, 2001	Anderson Mesa	LONEOS	·	7.7 km	MPC · JPL
48194	2001 HX_{63}	—	April 27, 2001	Socorro	LINEAR	·	5.1 km	MPC · JPL
48195	2001 HJ_{65}	—	April 30, 2001	Socorro	LINEAR	·	2.3 km	MPC · JPL
48196	2001 JU_{1}	—	May 11, 2001	Haleakala	NEAT	·	4.8 km	MPC · JPL
48197	2001 JO_{2}	—	May 15, 2001	Kitt Peak	Spacewatch	DOR	7.3 km	MPC · JPL
48198	2001 JA_{6}	—	May 11, 2001	Haleakala	NEAT	(5)	2.0 km	MPC · JPL
48199	2001 JU_{6}	—	May 14, 2001	Palomar	NEAT	PHO	2.0 km	MPC · JPL
48200 Nishiokatakashi	2001 KU_{1}	Nishiokatakashi	May 19, 2001	Bisei SG Center	BATTeRS	EUN	3.5 km	MPC · JPL

== 48201–48300 ==
back to top

Designation			Discovery			Properties		Ref
Permanent	Provisional	Named after	Date	Site	Discoverer(s)	Category	Diam.	Ref
48201	2001 KD_{3}	—	May 17, 2001	Socorro	LINEAR	·	3.4 km	MPC · JPL
48202	2001 KL_{5}	—	May 17, 2001	Socorro	LINEAR	·	10 km	MPC · JPL
48203	2001 KQ_{6}	—	May 17, 2001	Socorro	LINEAR	PHO	2.8 km	MPC · JPL
48204	2001 KG_{8}	—	May 18, 2001	Socorro	LINEAR	·	3.0 km	MPC · JPL
48205	2001 KX_{11}	—	May 18, 2001	Socorro	LINEAR	·	5.7 km	MPC · JPL
48206	2001 KV_{13}	—	May 17, 2001	Socorro	LINEAR	THM	7.4 km	MPC · JPL
48207	2001 KE_{15}	—	May 18, 2001	Socorro	LINEAR	KON	4.6 km	MPC · JPL
48208	2001 KJ_{17}	—	May 20, 2001	Socorro	LINEAR	·	7.0 km	MPC · JPL
48209	2001 KM_{18}	—	May 21, 2001	Kitt Peak	Spacewatch	EOS	6.1 km	MPC · JPL
48210	2001 KG_{22}	—	May 17, 2001	Socorro	LINEAR	·	3.4 km	MPC · JPL
48211	2001 KN_{22}	—	May 17, 2001	Socorro	LINEAR	EOS	5.5 km	MPC · JPL
48212	2001 KO_{24}	—	May 17, 2001	Socorro	LINEAR	·	7.9 km	MPC · JPL
48213	2001 KP_{24}	—	May 17, 2001	Socorro	LINEAR	HNS	4.1 km	MPC · JPL
48214	2001 KB_{27}	—	May 17, 2001	Socorro	LINEAR	·	7.3 km	MPC · JPL
48215	2001 KO_{28}	—	May 18, 2001	Socorro	LINEAR	·	4.7 km	MPC · JPL
48216	2001 KE_{38}	—	May 22, 2001	Socorro	LINEAR	·	3.1 km	MPC · JPL
48217	2001 KL_{38}	—	May 22, 2001	Socorro	LINEAR	·	2.8 km	MPC · JPL
48218	2001 KZ_{38}	—	May 22, 2001	Socorro	LINEAR	·	15 km	MPC · JPL
48219	2001 KN_{39}	—	May 22, 2001	Socorro	LINEAR	PHO	7.7 km	MPC · JPL
48220	2001 KX_{40}	—	May 23, 2001	Socorro	LINEAR	·	8.4 km	MPC · JPL
48221	2001 KA_{41}	—	May 23, 2001	Socorro	LINEAR	·	2.9 km	MPC · JPL
48222	2001 KJ_{42}	—	May 19, 2001	Farpoint	G. Hug	·	2.7 km	MPC · JPL
48223	2001 KV_{43}	—	May 22, 2001	Socorro	LINEAR	·	3.3 km	MPC · JPL
48224	2001 KK_{44}	—	May 22, 2001	Socorro	LINEAR	·	4.4 km	MPC · JPL
48225	2001 KG_{55}	—	May 22, 2001	Socorro	LINEAR	·	5.3 km	MPC · JPL
48226	2001 KK_{56}	—	May 22, 2001	Socorro	LINEAR	·	4.3 km	MPC · JPL
48227	2001 KG_{58}	—	May 26, 2001	Socorro	LINEAR	·	4.1 km	MPC · JPL
48228	2001 KB_{59}	—	May 26, 2001	Socorro	LINEAR	GEF	3.4 km	MPC · JPL
48229	2001 KP_{63}	—	May 20, 2001	Haleakala	NEAT	·	3.4 km	MPC · JPL
48230	2001 KS_{65}	—	May 22, 2001	Anderson Mesa	LONEOS	·	3.2 km	MPC · JPL
48231	2001 KF_{69}	—	May 22, 2001	Socorro	LINEAR	·	3.9 km	MPC · JPL
48232	2001 KY_{70}	—	May 24, 2001	Anderson Mesa	LONEOS	PHO	2.5 km	MPC · JPL
48233	2001 LY_{9}	—	June 15, 2001	Socorro	LINEAR	·	8.5 km	MPC · JPL
48234	2001 LT_{13}	—	June 15, 2001	Socorro	LINEAR	EOS	5.3 km	MPC · JPL
48235	2001 MG_{2}	—	June 19, 2001	Socorro	LINEAR	PHO	3.0 km	MPC · JPL
48236	2001 MP_{3}	—	June 19, 2001	Socorro	LINEAR	·	7.7 km	MPC · JPL
48237	2001 MJ_{5}	—	June 23, 2001	Powell	Powell	CYB	9.9 km	MPC · JPL
48238	2001 ML_{11}	—	June 19, 2001	Haleakala	NEAT	PHO	3.7 km	MPC · JPL
48239	2001 MM_{13}	—	June 24, 2001	Palomar	NEAT	·	3.6 km	MPC · JPL
48240	2001 NE	—	July 8, 2001	Palomar	NEAT	EOS	5.8 km	MPC · JPL
48241	2001 NS_{12}	—	July 13, 2001	Haleakala	NEAT	·	10 km	MPC · JPL
48242	2001 PB_{1}	—	August 2, 2001	Haleakala	NEAT	EOS	9.2 km	MPC · JPL
48243	2001 PE_{7}	—	August 11, 2001	Ondřejov	P. Kušnirák	ADE	6.8 km	MPC · JPL
48244	2001 PG_{8}	—	August 11, 2001	Palomar	NEAT	EOS	6.1 km	MPC · JPL
48245	2001 PD_{9}	—	August 11, 2001	Haleakala	NEAT	EOS	7.8 km	MPC · JPL
48246	2001 QG_{32}	—	August 17, 2001	Socorro	LINEAR	·	6.9 km	MPC · JPL
48247	2001 QU_{101}	—	August 18, 2001	Socorro	LINEAR	·	2.3 km	MPC · JPL
48248	2001 RP_{69}	—	September 10, 2001	Socorro	LINEAR	·	5.8 km	MPC · JPL
48249	2001 SY_{345}	—	September 23, 2001	Haleakala	NEAT	L5	19 km	MPC · JPL
48250	2001 TH_{9}	—	October 11, 2001	Socorro	LINEAR	EOS	5.2 km	MPC · JPL
48251	2001 TA_{190}	—	October 14, 2001	Socorro	LINEAR	·	2.9 km	MPC · JPL
48252	2001 TL_{212}	—	October 13, 2001	Palomar	NEAT	L5	20 km	MPC · JPL
48253	2001 UK_{22}	—	October 17, 2001	Socorro	LINEAR	·	9.6 km	MPC · JPL
48254	2001 UE_{83}	—	October 20, 2001	Socorro	LINEAR	L5	21 km	MPC · JPL
48255	2001 VY_{20}	—	November 9, 2001	Socorro	LINEAR	·	4.4 km	MPC · JPL
48256	2001 VT_{39}	—	November 9, 2001	Socorro	LINEAR	NYS	2.2 km	MPC · JPL
48257	2001 VE_{92}	—	November 15, 2001	Socorro	LINEAR	MAR	2.8 km	MPC · JPL
48258	2001 WA_{31}	—	November 17, 2001	Socorro	LINEAR	·	2.8 km	MPC · JPL
48259	2001 WL_{40}	—	November 17, 2001	Socorro	LINEAR	·	3.4 km	MPC · JPL
48260	2001 XM_{24}	—	December 10, 2001	Socorro	LINEAR	·	6.7 km	MPC · JPL
48261	2001 XT_{27}	—	December 10, 2001	Socorro	LINEAR	·	2.8 km	MPC · JPL
48262	2001 XL_{87}	—	December 13, 2001	Socorro	LINEAR	·	5.1 km	MPC · JPL
48263	2001 XX_{183}	—	December 14, 2001	Socorro	LINEAR	AGN	2.2 km	MPC · JPL
48264	2001 XB_{212}	—	December 11, 2001	Socorro	LINEAR	·	2.7 km	MPC · JPL
48265	2001 YZ_{15}	—	December 17, 2001	Socorro	LINEAR	·	6.1 km	MPC · JPL
48266	2001 YV_{117}	—	December 18, 2001	Socorro	LINEAR	EUN	4.2 km	MPC · JPL
48267	2001 YA_{118}	—	December 18, 2001	Socorro	LINEAR	·	2.2 km	MPC · JPL
48268 Comitini	2002 AK_{1}	Comitini	January 4, 2002	Asiago	ADAS	EUN	4.8 km	MPC · JPL
48269	2002 AX_{166}	—	January 13, 2002	Socorro	LINEAR	L4	22 km	MPC · JPL
48270	2002 CS_{82}	—	February 7, 2002	Socorro	LINEAR	·	5.1 km	MPC · JPL
48271	2002 CL_{112}	—	February 7, 2002	Socorro	LINEAR	NYS	1.9 km	MPC · JPL
48272	2002 CM_{139}	—	February 8, 2002	Socorro	LINEAR	·	4.3 km	MPC · JPL
48273	2002 CQ_{230}	—	February 12, 2002	Kitt Peak	Spacewatch	·	1.9 km	MPC · JPL
48274	2002 CY_{235}	—	February 10, 2002	Haleakala	NEAT	·	4.5 km	MPC · JPL
48275	2002 CY_{242}	—	February 11, 2002	Socorro	LINEAR	MAR	3.4 km	MPC · JPL
48276	2002 ED_{20}	—	March 9, 2002	Socorro	LINEAR	·	2.2 km	MPC · JPL
48277	2002 EQ_{26}	—	March 10, 2002	Anderson Mesa	LONEOS	·	3.4 km	MPC · JPL
48278	2002 EV_{69}	—	March 13, 2002	Socorro	LINEAR	NYS ·	4.0 km	MPC · JPL
48279	2002 EK_{72}	—	March 13, 2002	Socorro	LINEAR	AGN	2.8 km	MPC · JPL
48280	2002 EK_{85}	—	March 9, 2002	Socorro	LINEAR	·	5.0 km	MPC · JPL
48281	2002 EN_{153}	—	March 15, 2002	Kitt Peak	Spacewatch	MAS	1.4 km	MPC · JPL
48282	2002 FA_{22}	—	March 19, 2002	Socorro	LINEAR	·	5.5 km	MPC · JPL
48283	2002 GN_{19}	—	April 14, 2002	Socorro	LINEAR	·	3.1 km	MPC · JPL
48284	2002 GD_{60}	—	April 8, 2002	Kitt Peak	Spacewatch	AST	4.8 km	MPC · JPL
48285	2002 GK_{95}	—	April 9, 2002	Socorro	LINEAR	·	5.2 km	MPC · JPL
48286	2002 GZ_{96}	—	April 9, 2002	Socorro	LINEAR	·	5.6 km	MPC · JPL
48287	2002 GE_{167}	—	April 9, 2002	Socorro	LINEAR	·	3.3 km	MPC · JPL
48288	2002 HC_{6}	—	April 17, 2002	Socorro	LINEAR	·	5.3 km	MPC · JPL
48289	2002 HM_{15}	—	April 17, 2002	Socorro	LINEAR	·	4.3 km	MPC · JPL
48290 Idastraus	2002 JH	Idastraus	May 3, 2002	Desert Eagle	W. K. Y. Yeung	·	2.5 km	MPC · JPL
48291 Isidorstraus	2002 JQ_{1}	Isidorstraus	May 4, 2002	Desert Eagle	W. K. Y. Yeung	fast	1.9 km	MPC · JPL
48292	2002 JW_{14}	—	May 8, 2002	Socorro	LINEAR	·	3.1 km	MPC · JPL
48293	2002 JD_{52}	—	May 9, 2002	Socorro	LINEAR	PHO	3.0 km	MPC · JPL
48294	2002 JG_{131}	—	May 8, 2002	Haleakala	NEAT	·	3.0 km	MPC · JPL
48295 Liamgroah	2002 KW_{6}	Liamgroah	May 27, 2002	Palomar	NEAT	PHO	3.3 km	MPC · JPL
48296	2002 LB_{18}	—	June 6, 2002	Socorro	LINEAR	LUT	10 km	MPC · JPL
48297	2002 LJ_{24}	—	June 9, 2002	Desert Eagle	W. K. Y. Yeung	EUN	2.8 km	MPC · JPL
48298	2002 LL_{33}	—	June 5, 2002	Palomar	NEAT	·	4.2 km	MPC · JPL
48299	2002 LE_{35}	—	June 11, 2002	Fountain Hills	C. W. Juels, P. R. Holvorcem	·	2.6 km	MPC · JPL
48300 Kronk	2002 LG_{35}	Kronk	June 11, 2002	Fountain Hills	C. W. Juels, P. R. Holvorcem	EOS	8.0 km	MPC · JPL

== 48301–48400 ==
back to top

Designation			Discovery			Properties		Ref
Permanent	Provisional	Named after	Date	Site	Discoverer(s)	Category	Diam.	Ref
48301	2002 LL_{35}	—	June 12, 2002	Fountain Hills	C. W. Juels, P. R. Holvorcem	EUN	3.9 km	MPC · JPL
48302	2002 LM_{36}	—	June 9, 2002	Socorro	LINEAR	URS	11 km	MPC · JPL
48303	2002 LJ_{37}	—	June 10, 2002	Socorro	LINEAR	·	1.8 km	MPC · JPL
48304	2002 LL_{37}	—	June 11, 2002	Socorro	LINEAR	·	10 km	MPC · JPL
48305	2002 LS_{47}	—	June 12, 2002	Socorro	LINEAR	·	2.6 km	MPC · JPL
48306	2002 LA_{48}	—	June 14, 2002	Socorro	LINEAR	·	4.5 km	MPC · JPL
48307	2002 LP_{53}	—	June 9, 2002	Socorro	LINEAR	·	11 km	MPC · JPL
48308	2002 LP_{56}	—	June 9, 2002	Haleakala	NEAT	GEF	3.8 km	MPC · JPL
48309	2002 LG_{57}	—	June 10, 2002	Socorro	LINEAR	·	5.1 km	MPC · JPL
48310	2002 NE_{1}	—	July 4, 2002	Palomar	NEAT	·	6.4 km	MPC · JPL
48311	2002 NF_{3}	—	July 5, 2002	Palomar	NEAT	THM	7.4 km	MPC · JPL
48312	2002 NP_{3}	—	July 8, 2002	Palomar	NEAT	KOR	3.0 km	MPC · JPL
48313	2002 ND_{12}	—	July 4, 2002	Palomar	NEAT	·	2.1 km	MPC · JPL
48314	2002 NK_{13}	—	July 4, 2002	Palomar	NEAT	AEO	3.5 km	MPC · JPL
48315	2002 NX_{15}	—	July 5, 2002	Socorro	LINEAR	·	3.5 km	MPC · JPL
48316	2002 NQ_{19}	—	July 9, 2002	Socorro	LINEAR	·	2.4 km	MPC · JPL
48317	2002 NY_{20}	—	July 9, 2002	Socorro	LINEAR	HYG	8.0 km	MPC · JPL
48318	2002 NA_{22}	—	July 9, 2002	Socorro	LINEAR	·	1.7 km	MPC · JPL
48319	2002 NR_{25}	—	July 9, 2002	Socorro	LINEAR	·	2.6 km	MPC · JPL
48320	2002 NE_{27}	—	July 9, 2002	Socorro	LINEAR	·	3.3 km	MPC · JPL
48321	2002 NG_{28}	—	July 13, 2002	Socorro	LINEAR	(5)	3.2 km	MPC · JPL
48322	2002 NT_{32}	—	July 13, 2002	Socorro	LINEAR	EOS	5.5 km	MPC · JPL
48323	2002 NN_{33}	—	July 14, 2002	Socorro	LINEAR	·	5.0 km	MPC · JPL
48324	2002 NQ_{40}	—	July 14, 2002	Palomar	NEAT	·	6.5 km	MPC · JPL
48325	2002 NO_{42}	—	July 15, 2002	Palomar	NEAT	NYS	2.1 km	MPC · JPL
48326	2002 NE_{47}	—	July 13, 2002	Haleakala	NEAT	·	4.7 km	MPC · JPL
48327	2002 NF_{50}	—	July 13, 2002	Haleakala	NEAT	·	4.8 km	MPC · JPL
48328	2002 NN_{53}	—	July 14, 2002	Palomar	NEAT	(12739)	3.1 km	MPC · JPL
48329	2002 NA_{54}	—	July 5, 2002	Socorro	LINEAR	·	2.0 km	MPC · JPL
48330	2002 NA_{56}	—	July 12, 2002	Palomar	NEAT	·	2.4 km	MPC · JPL
48331	2002 NR_{56}	—	July 9, 2002	Socorro	LINEAR	·	6.0 km	MPC · JPL
48332	2002 OK_{3}	—	July 17, 2002	Socorro	LINEAR	·	3.5 km	MPC · JPL
48333	2002 OW_{6}	—	July 20, 2002	Palomar	NEAT	·	9.8 km	MPC · JPL
48334	2002 OX_{18}	—	July 19, 2002	Palomar	NEAT	·	1.9 km	MPC · JPL
48335	2002 PW_{1}	—	August 4, 2002	Socorro	LINEAR	·	3.5 km	MPC · JPL
48336	2002 PS_{6}	—	August 6, 2002	Socorro	LINEAR	H	1.5 km	MPC · JPL
48337	2002 PT_{6}	—	August 5, 2002	Reedy Creek	J. Broughton	·	2.6 km	MPC · JPL
48338	2002 PV_{27}	—	August 6, 2002	Palomar	NEAT	·	2.8 km	MPC · JPL
48339	2002 PC_{31}	—	August 6, 2002	Palomar	NEAT	HYG	8.7 km	MPC · JPL
48340	2002 PT_{32}	—	August 6, 2002	Palomar	NEAT	NYS	3.9 km	MPC · JPL
48341	2002 PU_{47}	—	August 10, 2002	Socorro	LINEAR	·	1.8 km	MPC · JPL
48342	2002 PQ_{51}	—	August 8, 2002	Palomar	NEAT	3:2	8.0 km	MPC · JPL
48343	2180 P-L	—	September 24, 1960	Palomar	C. J. van Houten, I. van Houten-Groeneveld, T. Gehrels	·	4.4 km	MPC · JPL
48344	2588 P-L	—	September 24, 1960	Palomar	C. J. van Houten, I. van Houten-Groeneveld, T. Gehrels	·	3.1 km	MPC · JPL
48345	2662 P-L	—	September 24, 1960	Palomar	C. J. van Houten, I. van Houten-Groeneveld, T. Gehrels	·	2.4 km	MPC · JPL
48346	3077 P-L	—	September 25, 1960	Palomar	C. J. van Houten, I. van Houten-Groeneveld, T. Gehrels	MAR	5.1 km	MPC · JPL
48347	3567 P-L	—	October 22, 1960	Palomar	C. J. van Houten, I. van Houten-Groeneveld, T. Gehrels	V	2.0 km	MPC · JPL
48348	4124 P-L	—	September 24, 1960	Palomar	C. J. van Houten, I. van Houten-Groeneveld, T. Gehrels	GEF	4.3 km	MPC · JPL
48349	4239 P-L	—	September 24, 1960	Palomar	C. J. van Houten, I. van Houten-Groeneveld, T. Gehrels	·	6.7 km	MPC · JPL
48350	6221 P-L	—	September 24, 1960	Palomar	C. J. van Houten, I. van Houten-Groeneveld, T. Gehrels	V	2.5 km	MPC · JPL
48351	6250 P-L	—	September 24, 1960	Palomar	C. J. van Houten, I. van Houten-Groeneveld, T. Gehrels	·	1.3 km	MPC · JPL
48352	6320 P-L	—	September 24, 1960	Palomar	C. J. van Houten, I. van Houten-Groeneveld, T. Gehrels	TEL	4.6 km	MPC · JPL
48353	6616 P-L	—	September 24, 1960	Palomar	C. J. van Houten, I. van Houten-Groeneveld, T. Gehrels	·	6.7 km	MPC · JPL
48354	1291 T-1	—	March 25, 1971	Palomar	C. J. van Houten, I. van Houten-Groeneveld, T. Gehrels	ADE	4.3 km	MPC · JPL
48355	2184 T-1	—	March 25, 1971	Palomar	C. J. van Houten, I. van Houten-Groeneveld, T. Gehrels	·	2.5 km	MPC · JPL
48356	3118 T-1	—	March 26, 1971	Palomar	C. J. van Houten, I. van Houten-Groeneveld, T. Gehrels	·	4.5 km	MPC · JPL
48357	1013 T-2	—	September 29, 1973	Palomar	C. J. van Houten, I. van Houten-Groeneveld, T. Gehrels	·	1.5 km	MPC · JPL
48358	1187 T-2	—	September 29, 1973	Palomar	C. J. van Houten, I. van Houten-Groeneveld, T. Gehrels	·	1.8 km	MPC · JPL
48359	1219 T-2	—	September 29, 1973	Palomar	C. J. van Houten, I. van Houten-Groeneveld, T. Gehrels	·	800 m	MPC · JPL
48360	1262 T-2	—	September 29, 1973	Palomar	C. J. van Houten, I. van Houten-Groeneveld, T. Gehrels	·	1.7 km	MPC · JPL
48361	2022 T-2	—	September 29, 1973	Palomar	C. J. van Houten, I. van Houten-Groeneveld, T. Gehrels	·	3.1 km	MPC · JPL
48362	2184 T-2	—	September 29, 1973	Palomar	C. J. van Houten, I. van Houten-Groeneveld, T. Gehrels	NYS · fast	2.2 km	MPC · JPL
48363	2192 T-2	—	September 29, 1973	Palomar	C. J. van Houten, I. van Houten-Groeneveld, T. Gehrels	·	2.4 km	MPC · JPL
48364	3096 T-2	—	September 30, 1973	Palomar	C. J. van Houten, I. van Houten-Groeneveld, T. Gehrels	V	2.1 km	MPC · JPL
48365	3106 T-2	—	September 30, 1973	Palomar	C. J. van Houten, I. van Houten-Groeneveld, T. Gehrels	EUN · slow	4.2 km	MPC · JPL
48366	3284 T-2	—	September 30, 1973	Palomar	C. J. van Houten, I. van Houten-Groeneveld, T. Gehrels	ERI	5.4 km	MPC · JPL
48367	4127 T-2	—	September 29, 1973	Palomar	C. J. van Houten, I. van Houten-Groeneveld, T. Gehrels	·	3.0 km	MPC · JPL
48368	4141 T-2	—	September 29, 1973	Palomar	C. J. van Houten, I. van Houten-Groeneveld, T. Gehrels	slow	3.3 km	MPC · JPL
48369	4153 T-2	—	September 29, 1973	Palomar	C. J. van Houten, I. van Houten-Groeneveld, T. Gehrels	KOR	3.6 km	MPC · JPL
48370	1056 T-3	—	October 17, 1977	Palomar	C. J. van Houten, I. van Houten-Groeneveld, T. Gehrels	·	3.4 km	MPC · JPL
48371	1173 T-3	—	October 17, 1977	Palomar	C. J. van Houten, I. van Houten-Groeneveld, T. Gehrels	fast	5.2 km	MPC · JPL
48372	1182 T-3	—	October 17, 1977	Palomar	C. J. van Houten, I. van Houten-Groeneveld, T. Gehrels	EOS	4.9 km	MPC · JPL
48373 Gorgythion	2161 T-3	Gorgythion	October 16, 1977	Palomar	C. J. van Houten, I. van Houten-Groeneveld, T. Gehrels	L5	20 km	MPC · JPL
48374	2583 T-3	—	October 17, 1977	Palomar	C. J. van Houten, I. van Houten-Groeneveld, T. Gehrels	EUN	3.0 km	MPC · JPL
48375	3320 T-3	—	October 16, 1977	Palomar	C. J. van Houten, I. van Houten-Groeneveld, T. Gehrels	·	3.1 km	MPC · JPL
48376	4044 T-3	—	October 16, 1977	Palomar	C. J. van Houten, I. van Houten-Groeneveld, T. Gehrels	slow	4.6 km	MPC · JPL
48377	4047 T-3	—	October 16, 1977	Palomar	C. J. van Houten, I. van Houten-Groeneveld, T. Gehrels	·	2.4 km	MPC · JPL
48378	4241 T-3	—	October 16, 1977	Palomar	C. J. van Houten, I. van Houten-Groeneveld, T. Gehrels	·	5.0 km	MPC · JPL
48379	4672 T-3	—	October 17, 1977	Palomar	C. J. van Houten, I. van Houten-Groeneveld, T. Gehrels	·	4.0 km	MPC · JPL
48380	5622 T-3	—	October 16, 1977	Palomar	C. J. van Houten, I. van Houten-Groeneveld, T. Gehrels	·	2.8 km	MPC · JPL
48381	1977 SU_{3}	—	September 17, 1977	Siding Spring	A. Boattini, G. Forti	H	1.8 km	MPC · JPL
48382	1978 UC_{6}	—	October 27, 1978	Palomar	C. M. Olmstead	·	1.9 km	MPC · JPL
48383	1978 VH_{7}	—	November 6, 1978	Palomar	E. F. Helin, S. J. Bus	·	2.0 km	MPC · JPL
48384	1978 VQ_{8}	—	November 7, 1978	Palomar	E. F. Helin, S. J. Bus	·	3.0 km	MPC · JPL
48385	1978 VH_{9}	—	November 7, 1978	Palomar	E. F. Helin, S. J. Bus	·	3.1 km	MPC · JPL
48386	1979 MQ_{1}	—	June 25, 1979	Siding Spring	E. F. Helin, S. J. Bus	EUN	3.8 km	MPC · JPL
48387	1979 MM_{2}	—	June 25, 1979	Siding Spring	E. F. Helin, S. J. Bus	·	2.9 km	MPC · JPL
48388	1979 MZ_{5}	—	June 25, 1979	Siding Spring	E. F. Helin, S. J. Bus	·	2.4 km	MPC · JPL
48389	1979 MV_{8}	—	June 25, 1979	Siding Spring	E. F. Helin, S. J. Bus	·	2.7 km	MPC · JPL
48390	1979 ON_{1}	—	July 24, 1979	Palomar	S. J. Bus	·	5.2 km	MPC · JPL
48391	1981 DH_{2}	—	February 28, 1981	Siding Spring	S. J. Bus	·	5.8 km	MPC · JPL
48392	1981 DV_{2}	—	February 28, 1981	Siding Spring	S. J. Bus	·	4.1 km	MPC · JPL
48393	1981 EB_{5}	—	March 2, 1981	Siding Spring	S. J. Bus	GEF	3.1 km	MPC · JPL
48394	1981 EP_{9}	—	March 1, 1981	Siding Spring	S. J. Bus	V	2.1 km	MPC · JPL
48395	1981 ES_{11}	—	March 7, 1981	Siding Spring	S. J. Bus	·	3.7 km	MPC · JPL
48396	1981 EP_{14}	—	March 1, 1981	Siding Spring	S. J. Bus	·	2.5 km	MPC · JPL
48397	1981 EL_{16}	—	March 6, 1981	Siding Spring	S. J. Bus	·	3.3 km	MPC · JPL
48398	1981 EN_{19}	—	March 2, 1981	Siding Spring	S. J. Bus	·	4.5 km	MPC · JPL
48399	1981 EA_{21}	—	March 2, 1981	Siding Spring	S. J. Bus	·	4.8 km	MPC · JPL
48400	1981 EZ_{21}	—	March 2, 1981	Siding Spring	S. J. Bus	KOR	3.3 km	MPC · JPL

== 48401–48500 ==
back to top

Designation			Discovery			Properties		Ref
Permanent	Provisional	Named after	Date	Site	Discoverer(s)	Category	Diam.	Ref
48401	1981 EW_{27}	—	March 2, 1981	Siding Spring	S. J. Bus	DOR	7.3 km	MPC · JPL
48402	1981 EH_{28}	—	March 2, 1981	Siding Spring	S. J. Bus	·	5.8 km	MPC · JPL
48403	1981 EP_{41}	—	March 2, 1981	Siding Spring	S. J. Bus	NYS	2.7 km	MPC · JPL
48404	1981 EQ_{41}	—	March 2, 1981	Siding Spring	S. J. Bus	·	9.1 km	MPC · JPL
48405	1981 EQ_{46}	—	March 2, 1981	Siding Spring	S. J. Bus	·	6.3 km	MPC · JPL
48406	1981 EQ_{47}	—	March 2, 1981	Siding Spring	S. J. Bus	·	3.7 km	MPC · JPL
48407	1981 QL_{2}	—	August 27, 1981	La Silla	H. Debehogne	(2076)	3.5 km	MPC · JPL
48408 Yoshinogari	1982 VN_{2}	Yoshinogari	November 14, 1982	Kiso	H. Kosai, K. Furukawa	EUN	4.2 km	MPC · JPL
48409	1984 SL_{5}	—	September 27, 1984	Palomar	Padgett, D.	·	4.6 km	MPC · JPL
48410 Kolmogorov	1985 QJ_{5}	Kolmogorov	August 23, 1985	Nauchnij	N. S. Chernykh	·	11 km	MPC · JPL
48411 Johnventre	1985 RB_{3}	Johnventre	September 5, 1985	La Silla	H. Debehogne	slow	3.7 km	MPC · JPL
48412	1986 QN_{1}	—	August 27, 1986	La Silla	H. Debehogne	·	7.0 km	MPC · JPL
48413	1986 TB_{7}	—	October 9, 1986	Piwnice	M. Antal	EOS · slow	7.8 km	MPC · JPL
48414	1987 OS	—	July 19, 1987	Palomar	E. F. Helin	·	2.8 km	MPC · JPL
48415 Dehio	1987 QT	Dehio	August 21, 1987	Tautenburg Observatory	F. Börngen	·	5.5 km	MPC · JPL
48416 Carmelita	1988 BM_{2}	Carmelita	January 24, 1988	Palomar	C. S. Shoemaker, E. M. Shoemaker	·	9.1 km	MPC · JPL
48417	1988 CQ_{2}	—	February 11, 1988	La Silla	E. W. Elst	·	6.8 km	MPC · JPL
48418	1988 EA_{1}	—	March 13, 1988	Brorfelde	P. Jensen	·	6.4 km	MPC · JPL
48419	1988 RB_{5}	—	September 2, 1988	La Silla	H. Debehogne	V	2.5 km	MPC · JPL
48420	1988 RN_{5}	—	September 2, 1988	La Silla	H. Debehogne	·	5.2 km	MPC · JPL
48421	1988 VF	—	November 3, 1988	Chiyoda	T. Kojima	·	2.7 km	MPC · JPL
48422 Schrade	1988 VN_{7}	Schrade	November 3, 1988	Tautenburg Observatory	F. Börngen	·	1.9 km	MPC · JPL
48423	1988 WA	—	November 17, 1988	Kushiro	S. Ueda, H. Kaneda	PHO	4.6 km	MPC · JPL
48424 Souchay	1988 XW_{4}	Souchay	December 5, 1988	Kiso	Nakamura, T.	KOR	5.0 km	MPC · JPL
48425 Tischendorf	1989 CB_{6}	Tischendorf	February 2, 1989	Tautenburg Observatory	F. Börngen	MAS	2.0 km	MPC · JPL
48426	1989 EV_{2}	—	March 2, 1989	La Silla	E. W. Elst	V	1.7 km	MPC · JPL
48427	1989 SZ_{2}	—	September 26, 1989	La Silla	E. W. Elst	·	4.1 km	MPC · JPL
48428	1989 SV_{5}	—	September 26, 1989	La Silla	E. W. Elst	·	4.1 km	MPC · JPL
48429	1989 SK_{10}	—	September 28, 1989	La Silla	H. Debehogne	·	2.5 km	MPC · JPL
48430	1989 TQ_{3}	—	October 7, 1989	La Silla	E. W. Elst	·	6.7 km	MPC · JPL
48431	1989 TV_{5}	—	October 2, 1989	Cerro Tololo	S. J. Bus	·	3.5 km	MPC · JPL
48432	1989 TM_{6}	—	October 7, 1989	La Silla	E. W. Elst	·	4.0 km	MPC · JPL
48433 Onishi	1989 US_{1}	Onishi	October 29, 1989	Kitami	A. Takahashi, K. Watanabe	·	13 km	MPC · JPL
48434 Maxbeckmann	1989 UN_{7}	Maxbeckmann	October 23, 1989	Tautenburg Observatory	F. Börngen	·	5.5 km	MPC · JPL
48435 Jaspers	1989 UR_{7}	Jaspers	October 23, 1989	Tautenburg Observatory	F. Börngen	·	6.0 km	MPC · JPL
48436	1989 VK	—	November 2, 1989	Yorii	M. Arai, H. Mori	·	2.8 km	MPC · JPL
48437	1989 VM_{1}	—	November 3, 1989	La Silla	E. W. Elst	·	1.4 km	MPC · JPL
48438	1989 WJ_{2}	—	November 21, 1989	Siding Spring	R. H. McNaught	L5	36 km	MPC · JPL
48439	1989 WR_{2}	—	November 20, 1989	Kushiro	S. Ueda, H. Kaneda	·	10 km	MPC · JPL
48440	1989 YO_{2}	—	December 30, 1989	Siding Spring	R. H. McNaught	·	2.0 km	MPC · JPL
48441	1990 ET_{1}	—	March 2, 1990	La Silla	E. W. Elst	BAP	1.7 km	MPC · JPL
48442	1990 GF	—	April 15, 1990	La Silla	E. W. Elst	·	5.9 km	MPC · JPL
48443	1990 HY_{5}	—	April 29, 1990	Siding Spring	A. Żytkow, M. J. Irwin	·	2.7 km	MPC · JPL
48444	1990 QQ_{7}	—	August 16, 1990	La Silla	E. W. Elst	EOS	9.6 km	MPC · JPL
48445	1990 QX_{7}	—	August 16, 1990	La Silla	E. W. Elst	·	7.9 km	MPC · JPL
48446	1990 RB_{1}	—	September 14, 1990	Palomar	H. E. Holt	LIX	10 km	MPC · JPL
48447 Hingley	1990 TK_{2}	Hingley	October 10, 1990	Tautenburg Observatory	L. D. Schmadel, F. Börngen	URS · slow	10 km	MPC · JPL
48448 Tokuda	1990 WR_{2}	Tokuda	November 21, 1990	Kitami	K. Endate, K. Watanabe	·	4.2 km	MPC · JPL
48449	1991 EK_{4}	—	March 12, 1991	La Silla	H. Debehogne	·	2.3 km	MPC · JPL
48450	1991 NA	—	July 7, 1991	Palomar	E. F. Helin	·	3.4 km	MPC · JPL
48451 Pichincha	1991 PC_{3}	Pichincha	August 2, 1991	La Silla	E. W. Elst	·	6.3 km	MPC · JPL
48452	1991 PH_{7}	—	August 6, 1991	La Silla	E. W. Elst	NYS	1.5 km	MPC · JPL
48453	1991 PT_{9}	—	August 13, 1991	Palomar	E. F. Helin	PHO	4.2 km	MPC · JPL
48454	1991 PP_{12}	—	August 5, 1991	Palomar	H. E. Holt	·	2.7 km	MPC · JPL
48455	1991 PK_{13}	—	August 5, 1991	Palomar	H. E. Holt	·	2.8 km	MPC · JPL
48456 Wilhelmwien	1991 RG_{3}	Wilhelmwien	September 12, 1991	Tautenburg Observatory	F. Börngen, L. D. Schmadel	·	8.7 km	MPC · JPL
48457 Joseffried	1991 RO_{3}	Joseffried	September 12, 1991	Tautenburg Observatory	L. D. Schmadel, F. Börngen	V	1.9 km	MPC · JPL
48458 Merian	1991 RG_{5}	Merian	September 13, 1991	Tautenburg Observatory	F. Börngen, L. D. Schmadel	(8737)	10 km	MPC · JPL
48459	1991 RO_{5}	—	September 13, 1991	Palomar	H. E. Holt	·	2.7 km	MPC · JPL
48460	1991 RH_{6}	—	September 13, 1991	Palomar	H. E. Holt	·	3.5 km	MPC · JPL
48461 Sabrinamaricia	1991 RN_{6}	Sabrinamaricia	September 7, 1991	Palomar	E. F. Helin, Cohen, S.	·	5.5 km	MPC · JPL
48462	1991 RT_{6}	—	September 3, 1991	Siding Spring	R. H. McNaught	·	15 km	MPC · JPL
48463	1991 RH_{14}	—	September 13, 1991	Palomar	H. E. Holt	V	2.7 km	MPC · JPL
48464	1991 RA_{17}	—	September 15, 1991	Palomar	H. E. Holt	V	2.6 km	MPC · JPL
48465	1991 RS_{20}	—	September 14, 1991	Palomar	H. E. Holt	·	10 km	MPC · JPL
48466	1991 RY_{29}	—	September 12, 1991	Palomar	H. E. Holt	·	2.2 km	MPC · JPL
48467	1991 SB_{1}	—	September 30, 1991	Siding Spring	R. H. McNaught	V	1.9 km	MPC · JPL
48468	1991 SS_{1}	—	September 29, 1991	Kitt Peak	Spacewatch	·	2.0 km	MPC · JPL
48469	1991 TQ_{1}	—	October 10, 1991	Palomar	J. Alu	PHO	4.8 km	MPC · JPL
48470 Wedemeyer	1991 TC_{2}	Wedemeyer	October 10, 1991	Palomar	K. J. Lawrence	H · moon	2.3 km	MPC · JPL
48471 Orchiston	1991 TV_{2}	Orchiston	October 7, 1991	Tautenburg Observatory	L. D. Schmadel, F. Börngen	·	2.0 km	MPC · JPL
48472 Mössbauer	1991 TJ_{6}	Mössbauer	October 2, 1991	Tautenburg Observatory	F. Börngen, L. D. Schmadel	·	2.4 km	MPC · JPL
48473	1991 TU_{9}	—	October 6, 1991	Kitt Peak	Spacewatch	NYS	3.0 km	MPC · JPL
48474	1991 UR	—	October 18, 1991	Kushiro	S. Ueda, H. Kaneda	V	3.8 km	MPC · JPL
48475	1991 UD_{2}	—	October 29, 1991	Kushiro	S. Ueda, H. Kaneda	EOS	9.6 km	MPC · JPL
48476	1991 UP_{3}	—	October 31, 1991	Kushiro	S. Ueda, H. Kaneda	NYS	1.8 km	MPC · JPL
48477	1991 VV	—	November 2, 1991	Palomar	E. F. Helin	PHO	3.8 km	MPC · JPL
48478	1991 VF_{3}	—	November 3, 1991	Palomar	E. F. Helin	PHO	3.3 km	MPC · JPL
48479	1991 XF	—	December 4, 1991	Kushiro	S. Ueda, H. Kaneda	·	4.0 km	MPC · JPL
48480 Falk	1991 YK_{1}	Falk	December 28, 1991	Tautenburg Observatory	F. Börngen	·	4.1 km	MPC · JPL
48481	1992 BZ_{3}	—	January 28, 1992	Kitt Peak	Spacewatch	·	3.6 km	MPC · JPL
48482 Oruki	1992 CN	Oruki	February 5, 1992	Geisei	T. Seki	HYG	8.1 km	MPC · JPL
48483	1992 CB_{3}	—	February 2, 1992	La Silla	E. W. Elst	·	3.9 km	MPC · JPL
48484	1992 ET_{1}	—	March 11, 1992	Kitt Peak	Dunn, A.	·	4.9 km	MPC · JPL
48485	1992 EX_{4}	—	March 1, 1992	La Silla	UESAC	EUN	2.8 km	MPC · JPL
48486	1992 EG_{5}	—	March 1, 1992	La Silla	UESAC	·	2.6 km	MPC · JPL
48487	1992 EY_{5}	—	March 2, 1992	La Silla	UESAC	EUN	3.4 km	MPC · JPL
48488	1992 EN_{12}	—	March 6, 1992	La Silla	UESAC	(5)	3.3 km	MPC · JPL
48489	1992 EZ_{28}	—	March 2, 1992	La Silla	UESAC	EUN · moon	2.9 km	MPC · JPL
48490	1992 GD_{4}	—	April 4, 1992	La Silla	E. W. Elst	RAF	2.9 km	MPC · JPL
48491	1992 HG_{5}	—	April 24, 1992	La Silla	H. Debehogne	TIR	6.1 km	MPC · JPL
48492 Utewielen	1992 SS_{17}	Utewielen	September 24, 1992	Tautenburg Observatory	L. D. Schmadel, F. Börngen	KOR	4.1 km	MPC · JPL
48493	1992 WG	—	November 16, 1992	Kushiro	S. Ueda, H. Kaneda	EOS	6.7 km	MPC · JPL
48494	1992 WM	—	November 16, 1992	Kushiro	S. Ueda, H. Kaneda	·	3.3 km	MPC · JPL
48495 Ryugado	1993 BB	Ryugado	January 16, 1993	Geisei	T. Seki	·	1.9 km	MPC · JPL
48496	1993 BM_{3}	—	January 26, 1993	Kitt Peak	T. J. Balonek	·	3.3 km	MPC · JPL
48497	1993 BQ_{5}	—	January 27, 1993	Caussols	E. W. Elst	·	3.8 km	MPC · JPL
48498 Murahashi	1993 BS_{6}	Murahashi	January 30, 1993	Kagoshima	M. Mukai, Takeishi, M.	·	18 km	MPC · JPL
48499	1993 BV_{7}	—	January 23, 1993	La Silla	E. W. Elst	·	11 km	MPC · JPL
48500	1993 DU_{2}	—	February 20, 1993	Caussols	E. W. Elst	HYG	7.9 km	MPC · JPL

== 48501–48600 ==
back to top

Designation			Discovery			Properties		Ref
Permanent	Provisional	Named after	Date	Site	Discoverer(s)	Category	Diam.	Ref
48501	1993 FM	—	March 23, 1993	Lake Tekapo	A. C. Gilmore, P. M. Kilmartin	THM	10 km	MPC · JPL
48502	1993 FL_{5}	—	March 17, 1993	La Silla	UESAC	·	2.6 km	MPC · JPL
48503	1993 FN_{6}	—	March 17, 1993	La Silla	UESAC	·	2.5 km	MPC · JPL
48504	1993 FK_{9}	—	March 17, 1993	La Silla	UESAC	·	3.1 km	MPC · JPL
48505	1993 FM_{10}	—	March 17, 1993	La Silla	UESAC	MAS	1.9 km	MPC · JPL
48506	1993 FO_{10}	—	March 17, 1993	La Silla	UESAC	·	7.1 km	MPC · JPL
48507	1993 FS_{11}	—	March 17, 1993	La Silla	UESAC	V	3.0 km	MPC · JPL
48508	1993 FF_{12}	—	March 17, 1993	La Silla	UESAC	·	4.6 km	MPC · JPL
48509	1993 FQ_{12}	—	March 17, 1993	La Silla	UESAC	NYS ·	4.3 km	MPC · JPL
48510	1993 FP_{13}	—	March 17, 1993	La Silla	UESAC	·	2.4 km	MPC · JPL
48511	1993 FR_{13}	—	March 17, 1993	La Silla	UESAC	·	3.6 km	MPC · JPL
48512	1993 FU_{15}	—	March 17, 1993	La Silla	UESAC	·	8.0 km	MPC · JPL
48513	1993 FB_{22}	—	March 21, 1993	La Silla	UESAC	MAS	2.1 km	MPC · JPL
48514	1993 FN_{22}	—	March 21, 1993	La Silla	UESAC	·	1.9 km	MPC · JPL
48515	1993 FO_{24}	—	March 21, 1993	La Silla	UESAC	HYG	7.2 km	MPC · JPL
48516	1993 FL_{25}	—	March 21, 1993	La Silla	UESAC	THB	9.1 km	MPC · JPL
48517	1993 FR_{25}	—	March 21, 1993	La Silla	UESAC	NYS	3.3 km	MPC · JPL
48518	1993 FB_{29}	—	March 21, 1993	La Silla	UESAC	·	4.2 km	MPC · JPL
48519	1993 FC_{37}	—	March 19, 1993	La Silla	UESAC	·	3.2 km	MPC · JPL
48520	1993 FK_{45}	—	March 19, 1993	La Silla	UESAC	·	2.7 km	MPC · JPL
48521	1993 FV_{50}	—	March 19, 1993	La Silla	UESAC	·	2.2 km	MPC · JPL
48522	1993 FF_{54}	—	March 17, 1993	La Silla	UESAC	·	9.7 km	MPC · JPL
48523	1993 FY_{55}	—	March 17, 1993	La Silla	UESAC	·	1.8 km	MPC · JPL
48524	1993 FY_{78}	—	March 21, 1993	La Silla	UESAC	·	7.5 km	MPC · JPL
48525	1993 GB	—	April 14, 1993	Kiyosato	S. Otomo	·	6.8 km	MPC · JPL
48526	1993 HL_{3}	—	April 20, 1993	Kitt Peak	Spacewatch	NYS	3.4 km	MPC · JPL
48527	1993 LC_{1}	—	June 13, 1993	Siding Spring	R. H. McNaught	H	1.2 km	MPC · JPL
48528	1993 OC_{3}	—	July 20, 1993	La Silla	E. W. Elst	·	3.6 km	MPC · JPL
48529 von Wrangel	1993 OV_{10}	von Wrangel	July 20, 1993	La Silla	E. W. Elst	3:2	9.9 km	MPC · JPL
48530	1993 PF	—	August 12, 1993	Farra d'Isonzo	Farra d'Isonzo	·	4.0 km	MPC · JPL
48531	1993 PP	—	August 13, 1993	Kitt Peak	Spacewatch	(5)	2.3 km	MPC · JPL
48532	1993 PL_{7}	—	August 15, 1993	Caussols	E. W. Elst	EUN	3.1 km	MPC · JPL
48533	1993 QU	—	August 19, 1993	Palomar	E. F. Helin	·	6.3 km	MPC · JPL
48534	1993 QM_{4}	—	August 18, 1993	Caussols	E. W. Elst	(17392)	3.3 km	MPC · JPL
48535	1993 RD_{4}	—	September 15, 1993	La Silla	E. W. Elst	·	3.9 km	MPC · JPL
48536	1993 RS_{6}	—	September 15, 1993	La Silla	E. W. Elst	·	3.2 km	MPC · JPL
48537	1993 RO_{7}	—	September 15, 1993	La Silla	E. W. Elst	·	3.3 km	MPC · JPL
48538	1993 RF_{15}	—	September 15, 1993	La Silla	H. Debehogne, E. W. Elst	·	3.6 km	MPC · JPL
48539	1993 SD_{11}	—	September 22, 1993	La Silla	H. Debehogne, E. W. Elst	·	5.0 km	MPC · JPL
48540	1993 TW_{8}	—	October 11, 1993	Kitt Peak	Spacewatch	JUN	6.0 km	MPC · JPL
48541	1993 TV_{10}	—	October 15, 1993	Kitt Peak	Spacewatch	ADE	9.1 km	MPC · JPL
48542	1993 TN_{13}	—	October 14, 1993	Palomar	H. E. Holt	·	6.2 km	MPC · JPL
48543	1993 TJ_{14}	—	October 9, 1993	La Silla	E. W. Elst	GEF	5.1 km	MPC · JPL
48544	1993 TO_{15}	—	October 9, 1993	La Silla	E. W. Elst	·	5.6 km	MPC · JPL
48545	1993 TZ_{16}	—	October 9, 1993	La Silla	E. W. Elst	NEM	4.0 km	MPC · JPL
48546	1993 TM_{19}	—	October 9, 1993	La Silla	E. W. Elst	AGN	2.8 km	MPC · JPL
48547	1993 TJ_{20}	—	October 9, 1993	La Silla	E. W. Elst	·	3.2 km	MPC · JPL
48548	1993 TM_{25}	—	October 9, 1993	La Silla	E. W. Elst	·	4.2 km	MPC · JPL
48549	1993 TP_{25}	—	October 9, 1993	La Silla	E. W. Elst	·	5.4 km	MPC · JPL
48550	1993 TU_{25}	—	October 9, 1993	La Silla	E. W. Elst	PAD	8.0 km	MPC · JPL
48551	1993 TR_{28}	—	October 9, 1993	La Silla	E. W. Elst	·	3.3 km	MPC · JPL
48552	1993 TN_{31}	—	October 9, 1993	La Silla	E. W. Elst	GEF	2.9 km	MPC · JPL
48553	1993 TS_{31}	—	October 9, 1993	La Silla	E. W. Elst	AGN	2.5 km	MPC · JPL
48554	1993 TL_{32}	—	October 9, 1993	La Silla	E. W. Elst	·	3.2 km	MPC · JPL
48555	1993 TW_{32}	—	October 9, 1993	La Silla	E. W. Elst	·	4.1 km	MPC · JPL
48556	1993 TK_{33}	—	October 9, 1993	La Silla	E. W. Elst	·	8.4 km	MPC · JPL
48557	1993 TJ_{37}	—	October 9, 1993	La Silla	E. W. Elst	·	5.4 km	MPC · JPL
48558	1993 TL_{38}	—	October 9, 1993	La Silla	E. W. Elst	MRX	3.8 km	MPC · JPL
48559	1993 TJ_{39}	—	October 9, 1993	La Silla	E. W. Elst	·	5.6 km	MPC · JPL
48560	1993 UX_{2}	—	October 20, 1993	Siding Spring	R. H. McNaught	EUN	3.6 km	MPC · JPL
48561	1993 UZ_{2}	—	October 21, 1993	Siding Spring	R. H. McNaught	·	7.4 km	MPC · JPL
48562	1993 UZ_{6}	—	October 20, 1993	La Silla	E. W. Elst	·	3.5 km	MPC · JPL
48563	1994 AP_{5}	—	January 5, 1994	Kitt Peak	Spacewatch	·	5.0 km	MPC · JPL
48564	1994 BL_{3}	—	January 16, 1994	Caussols	E. W. Elst, C. Pollas	·	5.4 km	MPC · JPL
48565	1994 CA_{9}	—	February 8, 1994	Mérida	Naranjo, O. A.	·	4.2 km	MPC · JPL
48566	1994 CH_{9}	—	February 7, 1994	La Silla	E. W. Elst	THM	9.0 km	MPC · JPL
48567	1994 CH_{14}	—	February 8, 1994	La Silla	E. W. Elst	·	2.8 km	MPC · JPL
48568	1994 CO_{14}	—	February 8, 1994	La Silla	E. W. Elst	·	5.2 km	MPC · JPL
48569	1994 EN	—	March 6, 1994	Farra d'Isonzo	Farra d'Isonzo	EOS	5.0 km	MPC · JPL
48570	1994 EA_{2}	—	March 9, 1994	Palomar	E. F. Helin	·	1.8 km	MPC · JPL
48571	1994 ER_{5}	—	March 9, 1994	Caussols	E. W. Elst	·	2.4 km	MPC · JPL
48572	1994 EJ_{6}	—	March 9, 1994	Caussols	E. W. Elst	·	1.7 km	MPC · JPL
48573	1994 JX_{5}	—	May 4, 1994	Kitt Peak	Spacewatch	·	8.5 km	MPC · JPL
48574	1994 JG_{6}	—	May 4, 1994	Kitt Peak	Spacewatch	·	8.0 km	MPC · JPL
48575 Hawaii	1994 NN	Hawaii	July 4, 1994	Kuma Kogen	A. Nakamura	EOS	6.8 km	MPC · JPL
48576	1994 NN_{2}	—	July 11, 1994	Palomar	C. S. Shoemaker	PHO	2.5 km	MPC · JPL
48577	1994 PD_{8}	—	August 10, 1994	La Silla	E. W. Elst	V	1.7 km	MPC · JPL
48578	1994 PL_{11}	—	August 10, 1994	La Silla	E. W. Elst	·	4.1 km	MPC · JPL
48579	1994 PW_{11}	—	August 10, 1994	La Silla	E. W. Elst	·	4.3 km	MPC · JPL
48580	1994 PD_{17}	—	August 10, 1994	La Silla	E. W. Elst	·	5.2 km	MPC · JPL
48581	1994 PV_{19}	—	August 12, 1994	La Silla	E. W. Elst	NYS	4.0 km	MPC · JPL
48582	1994 PF_{25}	—	August 12, 1994	La Silla	E. W. Elst	MAS	1.8 km	MPC · JPL
48583	1994 PE_{35}	—	August 10, 1994	La Silla	E. W. Elst	·	2.2 km	MPC · JPL
48584	1994 PF_{37}	—	August 10, 1994	La Silla	E. W. Elst	·	4.3 km	MPC · JPL
48585	1994 PK_{37}	—	August 10, 1994	La Silla	E. W. Elst	·	6.1 km	MPC · JPL
48586	1994 PE_{39}	—	August 10, 1994	La Silla	E. W. Elst	·	3.1 km	MPC · JPL
48587	1994 PO_{39}	—	August 10, 1994	La Silla	E. W. Elst	·	2.2 km	MPC · JPL
48588 Raschröder	1994 RP_{11}	Raschröder	September 2, 1994	Tautenburg Observatory	F. Börngen	·	1.9 km	MPC · JPL
48589	1994 RW_{17}	—	September 3, 1994	La Silla	E. W. Elst	·	2.8 km	MPC · JPL
48590 Asaiayumi	1994 TY_{2}	Asaiayumi	October 2, 1994	Kitami	K. Endate, K. Watanabe	·	11 km	MPC · JPL
48591 Shimajiri	1994 TB_{3}	Shimajiri	October 2, 1994	Kitami	K. Endate, K. Watanabe	EUN	4.4 km	MPC · JPL
48592	1994 TP_{5}	—	October 4, 1994	Kitt Peak	Spacewatch	NYS	3.3 km	MPC · JPL
48593	1994 VF	—	November 1, 1994	Oizumi	T. Kobayashi	slow	3.0 km	MPC · JPL
48594	1994 VA_{2}	—	November 3, 1994	Yatsugatake	Y. Kushida, O. Muramatsu	EUN	4.6 km	MPC · JPL
48595	1994 VH_{2}	—	November 9, 1994	Oizumi	T. Kobayashi	MAR	5.0 km	MPC · JPL
48596	1994 VY_{6}	—	November 7, 1994	Kushiro	S. Ueda, H. Kaneda	·	2.3 km	MPC · JPL
48597	1994 XP_{4}	—	December 3, 1994	Oizumi	T. Kobayashi	·	3.1 km	MPC · JPL
48598	1994 XD_{5}	—	December 9, 1994	Oizumi	T. Kobayashi	·	2.6 km	MPC · JPL
48599	1994 YS	—	December 28, 1994	Oizumi	T. Kobayashi	(5)	3.4 km	MPC · JPL
48600	1994 YZ	—	December 28, 1994	Oizumi	T. Kobayashi	EUN	4.1 km	MPC · JPL

== 48601–48700 ==
back to top

Designation			Discovery			Properties		Ref
Permanent	Provisional	Named after	Date	Site	Discoverer(s)	Category	Diam.	Ref
48601	1995 BL	—	January 23, 1995	Oizumi	T. Kobayashi	H	2.5 km	MPC · JPL
48602	1995 BV_{1}	—	January 27, 1995	Oizumi	T. Kobayashi	ADE	8.4 km	MPC · JPL
48603	1995 BC_{2}	—	January 30, 1995	Oizumi	T. Kobayashi	AMO +1km	840 m	MPC · JPL
48604	1995 CV	—	February 1, 1995	Kitt Peak	Spacewatch	L5	14 km	MPC · JPL
48605	1995 CW_{1}	—	February 7, 1995	Siding Spring	R. H. McNaught	GAL	3.7 km	MPC · JPL
48606	1995 DH	—	February 20, 1995	Oizumi	T. Kobayashi	·	9.2 km	MPC · JPL
48607 Yamagatatemodai	1995 DS_{2}	Yamagatatemodai	February 20, 1995	Nanyo	T. Okuni	·	6.8 km	MPC · JPL
48608	1995 DW_{8}	—	February 24, 1995	Kitt Peak	Spacewatch	KOR	3.5 km	MPC · JPL
48609	1995 DE_{14}	—	February 19, 1995	Kushiro	S. Ueda, H. Kaneda	·	3.6 km	MPC · JPL
48610	1995 EF_{6}	—	March 2, 1995	Kitt Peak	Spacewatch	·	7.4 km	MPC · JPL
48611	1995 FS_{6}	—	March 23, 1995	Kitt Peak	Spacewatch	·	5.8 km	MPC · JPL
48612	1995 FX_{6}	—	March 23, 1995	Kitt Peak	Spacewatch	·	4.8 km	MPC · JPL
48613	1995 FM_{11}	—	March 27, 1995	Kitt Peak	Spacewatch	·	2.1 km	MPC · JPL
48614	1995 FP_{14}	—	March 27, 1995	Kitt Peak	Spacewatch	·	5.4 km	MPC · JPL
48615	1995 FG_{16}	—	March 28, 1995	Kitt Peak	Spacewatch	·	5.0 km	MPC · JPL
48616 Yeminghan	1995 GP_{7}	Yeminghan	April 2, 1995	Xinglong	SCAP	·	8.2 km	MPC · JPL
48617	1995 HR_{2}	—	April 25, 1995	Kitt Peak	Spacewatch	·	4.7 km	MPC · JPL
48618	1995 HB_{4}	—	April 26, 1995	Kitt Peak	Spacewatch	·	5.0 km	MPC · JPL
48619 Jianli	1995 KV	Jianli	May 21, 1995	Xinglong	SCAP	·	1.5 km	MPC · JPL
48620	1995 MN_{5}	—	June 23, 1995	Kitt Peak	Spacewatch	TEL	3.8 km	MPC · JPL
48621	1995 OC	—	July 19, 1995	Cavezzo	Cavezzo	·	1.7 km	MPC · JPL
48622	1995 OA_{10}	—	July 30, 1995	Kitt Peak	Spacewatch	·	1.9 km	MPC · JPL
48623	1995 OV_{12}	—	July 22, 1995	Kitt Peak	Spacewatch	·	1.5 km	MPC · JPL
48624 Sadayuki	1995 PM	Sadayuki	August 4, 1995	Nanyo	T. Okuni	·	3.9 km	MPC · JPL
48625	1995 QF	—	August 16, 1995	Church Stretton	S. P. Laurie	·	1.9 km	MPC · JPL
48626	1995 QJ_{4}	—	August 20, 1995	Kitt Peak	Spacewatch	·	2.9 km	MPC · JPL
48627	1995 QX_{14}	—	August 28, 1995	Kitt Peak	Spacewatch	·	4.5 km	MPC · JPL
48628 Janetfender	1995 RD	Janetfender	September 7, 1995	Haleakala	AMOS	·	2.5 km	MPC · JPL
48629	1995 SP	—	September 18, 1995	Ondřejov	L. Kotková	·	3.9 km	MPC · JPL
48630	1995 SC_{7}	—	September 17, 1995	Kitt Peak	Spacewatch	·	1.7 km	MPC · JPL
48631 Hasantufan	1995 SK_{29}	Hasantufan	September 26, 1995	Zelenchukskaya	T. V. Krjačko	·	2.3 km	MPC · JPL
48632	1995 SV_{29}	—	September 29, 1995	Church Stretton	S. P. Laurie	·	2.2 km	MPC · JPL
48633	1995 SH_{38}	—	September 24, 1995	Kitt Peak	Spacewatch	·	4.7 km	MPC · JPL
48634	1995 SE_{44}	—	September 25, 1995	Kitt Peak	Spacewatch	CYB	11 km	MPC · JPL
48635 Murata	1995 SU_{52}	Murata	September 20, 1995	Kitami	K. Endate, K. Watanabe	·	2.4 km	MPC · JPL
48636 Huangkun	1995 SS_{53}	Huangkun	September 28, 1995	Xinglong	SCAP	·	1.5 km	MPC · JPL
48637	1995 SU_{87}	—	September 26, 1995	Kitt Peak	Spacewatch	·	1.9 km	MPC · JPL
48638 Třebíč	1995 TB	Třebíč	October 3, 1995	Kleť	M. Tichý	·	2.6 km	MPC · JPL
48639	1995 TL_{8}	—	October 15, 1995	Steward Observatory	Gleason, A.	other TNO · moon	176 km	MPC · JPL
48640 Eziobosso	1995 UD	Eziobosso	October 17, 1995	Sormano	P. Sicoli, Ghezzi, P.	·	2.2 km	MPC · JPL
48641	1995 UA_{1}	—	October 20, 1995	Višnjan Observatory	K. Korlević, Brcic, V.	V	2.3 km	MPC · JPL
48642	1995 UH_{1}	—	October 23, 1995	Sudbury	D. di Cicco	·	2.2 km	MPC · JPL
48643 Allen-Beach	1995 UA_{2}	Allen-Beach	October 20, 1995	Sormano	P. Sicoli, F. Manca	·	2.1 km	MPC · JPL
48644	1995 UG_{7}	—	October 27, 1995	Kushiro	S. Ueda, H. Kaneda	V	2.6 km	MPC · JPL
48645	1995 UF_{8}	—	October 27, 1995	Oizumi	T. Kobayashi	PHO	6.0 km	MPC · JPL
48646	1995 UL_{8}	—	October 27, 1995	Oizumi	T. Kobayashi	NYS	3.3 km	MPC · JPL
48647	1995 UT_{8}	—	October 27, 1995	Kushiro	S. Ueda, H. Kaneda	·	2.4 km	MPC · JPL
48648	1995 UQ_{12}	—	October 17, 1995	Kitt Peak	Spacewatch	NYS	3.1 km	MPC · JPL
48649	1995 UH_{37}	—	October 21, 1995	Kitt Peak	Spacewatch	·	2.4 km	MPC · JPL
48650 Kazanuniversity	1995 UX_{48}	Kazanuniversity	October 17, 1995	Zelenchukskaya	Solovyov, V. Y.	·	3.7 km	MPC · JPL
48651	1995 UC_{54}	—	October 22, 1995	Kitt Peak	Spacewatch	NYS	3.1 km	MPC · JPL
48652	1995 VB	—	November 1, 1995	Oizumi	T. Kobayashi	·	2.2 km	MPC · JPL
48653	1995 VD	—	November 1, 1995	Oizumi	T. Kobayashi	·	3.6 km	MPC · JPL
48654	1995 VG_{10}	—	November 15, 1995	Kitt Peak	Spacewatch	MAS	1.2 km	MPC · JPL
48655	1995 VQ_{12}	—	November 15, 1995	Kitt Peak	Spacewatch	·	2.1 km	MPC · JPL
48656	1995 VN_{18}	—	November 15, 1995	Kitt Peak	Spacewatch	·	2.7 km	MPC · JPL
48657	1995 WK	—	November 16, 1995	Oizumi	T. Kobayashi	V	1.8 km	MPC · JPL
48658	1995 WT_{1}	—	November 16, 1995	Kushiro	S. Ueda, H. Kaneda	(2076)	2.3 km	MPC · JPL
48659	1995 WX_{2}	—	November 16, 1995	Kitt Peak	Spacewatch	·	2.0 km	MPC · JPL
48660	1995 WA_{5}	—	November 24, 1995	Oizumi	T. Kobayashi	·	2.4 km	MPC · JPL
48661	1995 WH_{5}	—	November 24, 1995	Oizumi	T. Kobayashi	·	2.2 km	MPC · JPL
48662	1995 WK_{5}	—	November 24, 1995	Oizumi	T. Kobayashi	·	2.4 km	MPC · JPL
48663	1995 WY_{7}	—	November 29, 1995	Oizumi	T. Kobayashi	·	2.3 km	MPC · JPL
48664	1995 WG_{9}	—	November 16, 1995	Kitt Peak	Spacewatch	·	2.3 km	MPC · JPL
48665	1995 WL_{25}	—	November 18, 1995	Kitt Peak	Spacewatch	·	2.6 km	MPC · JPL
48666	1995 WU_{26}	—	November 17, 1995	Kitt Peak	Spacewatch	NYS	2.4 km	MPC · JPL
48667	1995 WS_{33}	—	November 20, 1995	Kitt Peak	Spacewatch	·	2.5 km	MPC · JPL
48668	1995 XB_{1}	—	December 15, 1995	Oizumi	T. Kobayashi	·	15 km	MPC · JPL
48669	1995 YO_{1}	—	December 21, 1995	Oizumi	T. Kobayashi	·	1.9 km	MPC · JPL
48670	1995 YW_{2}	—	December 26, 1995	Oizumi	T. Kobayashi	·	3.3 km	MPC · JPL
48671	1995 YS_{3}	—	December 27, 1995	Oizumi	T. Kobayashi	·	4.6 km	MPC · JPL
48672	1995 YF_{5}	—	December 16, 1995	Kitt Peak	Spacewatch	NYS	4.3 km	MPC · JPL
48673	1995 YF_{16}	—	December 20, 1995	Kitt Peak	Spacewatch	(5)	2.6 km	MPC · JPL
48674	1995 YV_{21}	—	December 17, 1995	Xinglong	SCAP	·	3.1 km	MPC · JPL
48675	1995 YA_{23}	—	December 21, 1995	Haleakala	NEAT	MAS	1.8 km	MPC · JPL
48676	1996 AW_{6}	—	January 12, 1996	Kitt Peak	Spacewatch	NYS	2.5 km	MPC · JPL
48677	1996 AQ_{7}	—	January 12, 1996	Kitt Peak	Spacewatch	NYS	2.5 km	MPC · JPL
48678	1996 AP_{12}	—	January 15, 1996	Kitt Peak	Spacewatch	·	2.9 km	MPC · JPL
48679	1996 AL_{19}	—	January 15, 1996	Kitt Peak	Spacewatch	V	1.8 km	MPC · JPL
48680 Kamijo	1996 BU	Kamijo	January 17, 1996	Kitami	K. Endate, K. Watanabe	slow	3.9 km	MPC · JPL
48681 Zeilinger	1996 BZ	Zeilinger	January 21, 1996	Linz	E. Meyer, E. Obermair	·	4.3 km	MPC · JPL
48682	1996 BP_{1}	—	January 23, 1996	Oizumi	T. Kobayashi	·	3.2 km	MPC · JPL
48683	1996 BQ_{1}	—	January 23, 1996	Oizumi	T. Kobayashi	·	2.4 km	MPC · JPL
48684	1996 EP	—	March 14, 1996	Sudbury	D. di Cicco	NYS	4.3 km	MPC · JPL
48685	1996 EW	—	March 15, 1996	Haleakala	NEAT	EUN	3.6 km	MPC · JPL
48686 Kashimura	1996 EM_{1}	Kashimura	March 10, 1996	Kitami	K. Endate, K. Watanabe	·	3.4 km	MPC · JPL
48687	1996 EO_{6}	—	March 11, 1996	Kitt Peak	Spacewatch	EUN	2.3 km	MPC · JPL
48688	1996 FM_{2}	—	March 17, 1996	Haleakala	NEAT	·	3.6 km	MPC · JPL
48689	1996 GP_{1}	—	April 8, 1996	Xinglong	SCAP	HNS	6.2 km	MPC · JPL
48690	1996 GP_{4}	—	April 11, 1996	Kitt Peak	Spacewatch	·	3.8 km	MPC · JPL
48691	1996 GP_{6}	—	April 12, 1996	Kitt Peak	Spacewatch	(12739)	5.0 km	MPC · JPL
48692	1996 GE_{20}	—	April 15, 1996	La Silla	E. W. Elst	·	7.0 km	MPC · JPL
48693	1996 GH_{20}	—	April 15, 1996	La Silla	E. W. Elst	·	2.9 km	MPC · JPL
48694	1996 HP	—	April 18, 1996	Ondřejov	L. Kotková	EUN	4.8 km	MPC · JPL
48695	1996 HG_{7}	—	April 18, 1996	Kitt Peak	Spacewatch	·	3.0 km	MPC · JPL
48696	1996 HJ_{8}	—	April 17, 1996	La Silla	E. W. Elst	(5)	4.0 km	MPC · JPL
48697	1996 HX_{14}	—	April 17, 1996	La Silla	E. W. Elst	·	3.1 km	MPC · JPL
48698	1996 HJ_{20}	—	April 18, 1996	La Silla	E. W. Elst	AST	6.4 km	MPC · JPL
48699	1996 HN_{21}	—	April 18, 1996	La Silla	E. W. Elst	·	6.4 km	MPC · JPL
48700 Hanggao	1996 HZ_{21}	Hanggao	April 17, 1996	Xinglong	SCAP	·	3.7 km	MPC · JPL

== 48701–48800 ==
back to top

Designation			Discovery			Properties		Ref
Permanent	Provisional	Named after	Date	Site	Discoverer(s)	Category	Diam.	Ref
48701	1996 HD_{22}	—	April 18, 1996	Xinglong	SCAP	EUN	3.9 km	MPC · JPL
48702	1996 JE	—	May 6, 1996	Lime Creek	R. Linderholm	·	3.0 km	MPC · JPL
48703	1996 JQ	—	May 12, 1996	Prescott	P. G. Comba	H	1.3 km	MPC · JPL
48704	1996 JR_{2}	—	May 14, 1996	Xinglong	SCAP	·	10 km	MPC · JPL
48705	1996 JR_{3}	—	May 9, 1996	Kitt Peak	Spacewatch	·	3.4 km	MPC · JPL
48706	1996 JF_{9}	—	May 12, 1996	Kitt Peak	Spacewatch	·	2.7 km	MPC · JPL
48707	1996 KR_{1}	—	May 19, 1996	Xinglong	SCAP	H · slow	1.5 km	MPC · JPL
48708	1996 LM_{2}	—	June 8, 1996	Kitt Peak	Spacewatch	·	3.7 km	MPC · JPL
48709	1996 LX_{2}	—	June 11, 1996	Kitt Peak	Spacewatch	V	1.4 km	MPC · JPL
48710	1996 LB_{3}	—	June 8, 1996	Kitt Peak	Spacewatch	·	5.5 km	MPC · JPL
48711	1996 ND_{5}	—	July 14, 1996	La Silla	E. W. Elst	THM	7.9 km	MPC · JPL
48712	1996 OV_{2}	—	July 26, 1996	Haleakala	AMOS	·	3.2 km	MPC · JPL
48713	1996 PT_{1}	—	August 9, 1996	Haleakala	NEAT	·	8.1 km	MPC · JPL
48714	1996 PB_{8}	—	August 8, 1996	La Silla	E. W. Elst	·	7.8 km	MPC · JPL
48715 Balbinot	1996 RP_{2}	Balbinot	September 13, 1996	Bologna	San Vittore	HYG	9.3 km	MPC · JPL
48716	1996 RH_{3}	—	September 13, 1996	Prescott	P. G. Comba	·	6.9 km	MPC · JPL
48717	1996 RR_{5}	—	September 15, 1996	Catalina Station	T. B. Spahr	T_{j} (2.98) · EUP	11 km	MPC · JPL
48718	1996 RZ_{15}	—	September 13, 1996	Kitt Peak	Spacewatch	·	7.1 km	MPC · JPL
48719	1996 RU_{25}	—	September 13, 1996	Haleakala	NEAT	(3460)	8.3 km	MPC · JPL
48720 Enricomentana	1996 SD_{7}	Enricomentana	September 29, 1996	Colleverde	V. S. Casulli	·	3.3 km	MPC · JPL
48721	1996 UJ_{2}	—	October 17, 1996	Kitt Peak	Spacewatch	EOS	6.5 km	MPC · JPL
48722	1996 VZ_{20}	—	November 8, 1996	Kitt Peak	Spacewatch	·	11 km	MPC · JPL
48723	1996 XF_{22}	—	December 8, 1996	Kitt Peak	Spacewatch	·	1.9 km	MPC · JPL
48724	1996 XZ_{26}	—	December 8, 1996	Xinglong	SCAP	·	3.2 km	MPC · JPL
48725	1997 AQ_{1}	—	January 2, 1997	Oizumi	T. Kobayashi	(2076)	3.8 km	MPC · JPL
48726	1997 AZ_{12}	—	January 10, 1997	Oizumi	T. Kobayashi	·	2.2 km	MPC · JPL
48727	1997 AL_{18}	—	January 15, 1997	Kleť	Kleť	·	2.0 km	MPC · JPL
48728	1997 AM_{20}	—	January 11, 1997	Kitt Peak	Spacewatch	·	2.7 km	MPC · JPL
48729	1997 AG_{22}	—	January 14, 1997	Modra	L. Kornoš, P. Kolény	·	2.0 km	MPC · JPL
48730	1997 BD_{3}	—	January 30, 1997	Oizumi	T. Kobayashi	·	2.3 km	MPC · JPL
48731	1997 BV_{3}	—	January 31, 1997	Oizumi	T. Kobayashi	·	2.9 km	MPC · JPL
48732	1997 CM_{4}	—	February 3, 1997	Kleť	Kleť	·	1.6 km	MPC · JPL
48733	1997 CK_{6}	—	February 3, 1997	Haleakala	NEAT	V	1.6 km	MPC · JPL
48734	1997 CZ_{16}	—	February 6, 1997	Chichibu	N. Satō	·	2.2 km	MPC · JPL
48735	1997 CX_{19}	—	February 12, 1997	Oizumi	T. Kobayashi	·	2.3 km	MPC · JPL
48736 Ehime	1997 DL	Ehime	February 27, 1997	Kuma Kogen	A. Nakamura	·	2.6 km	MPC · JPL
48737 Cusinato	1997 ER_{11}	Cusinato	March 8, 1997	Pianoro	V. Goretti	·	3.1 km	MPC · JPL
48738	1997 ER_{16}	—	March 5, 1997	Kitt Peak	Spacewatch	MAS	1.4 km	MPC · JPL
48739 Kandachiyoko	1997 EV_{17}	Kandachiyoko	March 3, 1997	Kitami	K. Endate, K. Watanabe	V	1.9 km	MPC · JPL
48740	1997 EF_{32}	—	March 11, 1997	Kitt Peak	Spacewatch	·	2.9 km	MPC · JPL
48741	1997 EO_{42}	—	March 10, 1997	Socorro	LINEAR	NYS	2.7 km	MPC · JPL
48742	1997 EE_{47}	—	March 12, 1997	La Silla	E. W. Elst	·	2.5 km	MPC · JPL
48743	1997 EE_{57}	—	March 10, 1997	La Silla	E. W. Elst	NYS	2.5 km	MPC · JPL
48744	1997 FY_{2}	—	March 31, 1997	Socorro	LINEAR	·	2.6 km	MPC · JPL
48745	1997 GA	—	April 1, 1997	Modra	A. Galád, A. Pravda	·	2.4 km	MPC · JPL
48746	1997 GE_{1}	—	April 2, 1997	Kitt Peak	Spacewatch	·	2.0 km	MPC · JPL
48747	1997 GD_{2}	—	April 7, 1997	Kitt Peak	Spacewatch	·	2.1 km	MPC · JPL
48748 Kondoshusaku	1997 GV_{3}	Kondoshusaku	April 3, 1997	Kitami	K. Endate, K. Watanabe	V	2.1 km	MPC · JPL
48749	1997 GZ_{6}	—	April 2, 1997	Socorro	LINEAR	NYS	2.6 km	MPC · JPL
48750	1997 GG_{8}	—	April 2, 1997	Socorro	LINEAR	·	3.7 km	MPC · JPL
48751	1997 GM_{8}	—	April 2, 1997	Socorro	LINEAR	V	2.1 km	MPC · JPL
48752	1997 GH_{9}	—	April 3, 1997	Socorro	LINEAR	·	3.2 km	MPC · JPL
48753	1997 GC_{19}	—	April 3, 1997	Socorro	LINEAR	·	3.6 km	MPC · JPL
48754	1997 GJ_{22}	—	April 6, 1997	Socorro	LINEAR	·	2.5 km	MPC · JPL
48755	1997 GQ_{24}	—	April 7, 1997	Socorro	LINEAR	·	3.1 km	MPC · JPL
48756 Yoshiharukuni	1997 GO_{28}	Yoshiharukuni	April 11, 1997	Nanyo	T. Okuni	NYS	4.3 km	MPC · JPL
48757	1997 GC_{33}	—	April 3, 1997	Socorro	LINEAR	·	1.9 km	MPC · JPL
48758	1997 GX_{35}	—	April 6, 1997	Socorro	LINEAR	·	3.5 km	MPC · JPL
48759	1997 GB_{36}	—	April 6, 1997	Socorro	LINEAR	·	3.2 km	MPC · JPL
48760	1997 HM_{11}	—	April 30, 1997	Socorro	LINEAR	·	3.0 km	MPC · JPL
48761	1997 HV_{11}	—	April 30, 1997	Socorro	LINEAR	·	2.4 km	MPC · JPL
48762	1997 HD_{13}	—	April 30, 1997	Socorro	LINEAR	·	2.8 km	MPC · JPL
48763	1997 JZ	—	May 2, 1997	Xinglong	SCAP	PHO	4.4 km	MPC · JPL
48764	1997 JJ_{10}	—	May 5, 1997	Kitt Peak	Spacewatch	L5	28 km	MPC · JPL
48765	1997 JN_{13}	—	May 3, 1997	La Silla	E. W. Elst	NYS	3.4 km	MPC · JPL
48766	1997 JY_{13}	—	May 3, 1997	La Silla	E. W. Elst	·	4.0 km	MPC · JPL
48767 Skamander	1997 JG_{15}	Skamander	May 3, 1997	La Silla	E. W. Elst	L5	22 km	MPC · JPL
48768	1997 KE	—	May 29, 1997	Kitt Peak	Spacewatch	EUN	2.9 km	MPC · JPL
48769	1997 MJ	—	June 26, 1997	Kitt Peak	Spacewatch	·	3.1 km	MPC · JPL
48770	1997 MO_{3}	—	June 28, 1997	Socorro	LINEAR	·	3.5 km	MPC · JPL
48771	1997 MJ_{6}	—	June 27, 1997	Kitt Peak	Spacewatch	·	2.7 km	MPC · JPL
48772	1997 MR_{9}	—	June 27, 1997	Kitt Peak	Spacewatch	·	3.1 km	MPC · JPL
48773 Davidrowe	1997 PS	Davidrowe	August 3, 1997	Caussols	ODAS	ADE	6.7 km	MPC · JPL
48774 Anngower	1997 PO_{2}	Anngower	August 10, 1997	NRC-DAO	D. D. Balam	·	5.3 km	MPC · JPL
48775	1997 QL	—	August 24, 1997	Kleť	Z. Moravec	·	5.0 km	MPC · JPL
48776	1997 QT	—	August 27, 1997	Kleť	Z. Moravec	·	5.8 km	MPC · JPL
48777	1997 QE_{5}	—	August 25, 1997	Reedy Creek	J. Broughton	·	6.0 km	MPC · JPL
48778 Shokoyukako	1997 RE	Shokoyukako	September 1, 1997	Yatsuka	H. Abe	GEF	3.9 km	MPC · JPL
48779 Mariko	1997 RH	Mariko	September 1, 1997	Yatsuka	H. Abe	(11882)	2.8 km	MPC · JPL
48780	1997 RA_{2}	—	September 4, 1997	Caussols	ODAS	·	4.4 km	MPC · JPL
48781	1997 SL	—	September 20, 1997	Ondřejov	L. Kotková	·	3.9 km	MPC · JPL
48782 Fierz	1997 SP	Fierz	September 20, 1997	Ondřejov	L. Kotková	·	3.5 km	MPC · JPL
48783	1997 SR	—	September 20, 1997	Woomera	F. B. Zoltowski	·	5.7 km	MPC · JPL
48784	1997 SX	—	September 17, 1997	Xinglong	SCAP	EOS	7.5 km	MPC · JPL
48785 Pitter	1997 SA_{2}	Pitter	September 23, 1997	Ondřejov	P. Pravec	·	5.5 km	MPC · JPL
48786	1997 SH_{4}	—	September 27, 1997	Oizumi	T. Kobayashi	·	8.1 km	MPC · JPL
48787	1997 SY_{4}	—	September 26, 1997	Woomera	F. B. Zoltowski	slow	2.9 km	MPC · JPL
48788	1997 SL_{6}	—	September 23, 1997	Kitt Peak	Spacewatch	·	4.7 km	MPC · JPL
48789	1997 SV_{12}	—	September 28, 1997	Kitt Peak	Spacewatch	·	5.3 km	MPC · JPL
48790	1997 SH_{30}	—	September 30, 1997	Kitt Peak	Spacewatch	KOR	2.9 km	MPC · JPL
48791	1997 SD_{33}	—	September 29, 1997	Kitt Peak	Spacewatch	THM	5.7 km	MPC · JPL
48792	1997 SC_{34}	—	September 17, 1997	Xinglong	SCAP	·	4.8 km	MPC · JPL
48793	1997 TK_{8}	—	October 4, 1997	Kitt Peak	Spacewatch	WIT	2.3 km	MPC · JPL
48794 Stolzová	1997 TY_{8}	Stolzová	October 5, 1997	Kleť	J. Tichá, M. Tichý	(16286)	4.1 km	MPC · JPL
48795	1997 TB_{10}	—	October 6, 1997	Ondřejov	P. Pravec	·	4.9 km	MPC · JPL
48796	1997 TE_{11}	—	October 3, 1997	Kitt Peak	Spacewatch	GEF	2.8 km	MPC · JPL
48797	1997 TV_{12}	—	October 2, 1997	Kitt Peak	Spacewatch	KOR	3.6 km	MPC · JPL
48798 Penghuanwu	1997 TS_{18}	Penghuanwu	October 6, 1997	Xinglong	SCAP	GEF	4.2 km	MPC · JPL
48799 Tashikuergan	1997 TX_{18}	Tashikuergan	October 8, 1997	Xinglong	Xinglong	KOR	3.0 km	MPC · JPL
48800	1997 TS_{22}	—	October 5, 1997	Kitt Peak	Spacewatch	KOR	3.8 km	MPC · JPL

== 48801–48900 ==
back to top

Designation			Discovery			Properties		Ref
Permanent	Provisional	Named after	Date	Site	Discoverer(s)	Category	Diam.	Ref
48801 Penninger	1997 UC_{1}	Penninger	October 22, 1997	Linz	E. Meyer	DOR	6.7 km	MPC · JPL
48802	1997 UU_{8}	—	October 25, 1997	Kitami	K. Endate, K. Watanabe	THM	8.7 km	MPC · JPL
48803	1997 UN_{10}	—	October 29, 1997	Haleakala	NEAT	EOS	6.0 km	MPC · JPL
48804	1997 UE_{12}	—	October 23, 1997	Kitt Peak	Spacewatch	KOR	2.5 km	MPC · JPL
48805	1997 UY_{13}	—	October 23, 1997	Kitt Peak	Spacewatch	·	4.5 km	MPC · JPL
48806	1997 UB_{21}	—	October 30, 1997	Xinglong	SCAP	·	6.8 km	MPC · JPL
48807 Takahata	1997 UT_{21}	Takahata	October 22, 1997	Nanyo	T. Okuni	·	5.0 km	MPC · JPL
48808	1997 VK_{3}	—	November 6, 1997	Oizumi	T. Kobayashi	·	5.1 km	MPC · JPL
48809	1997 VX_{4}	—	November 4, 1997	Nachi-Katsuura	Y. Shimizu, T. Urata	·	6.1 km	MPC · JPL
48810	1997 VA_{7}	—	November 14, 1997	Stroncone	Santa Lucia	WAT	5.6 km	MPC · JPL
48811	1997 WH	—	November 18, 1997	Oizumi	T. Kobayashi	·	8.8 km	MPC · JPL
48812	1997 WL	—	November 18, 1997	Oizumi	T. Kobayashi	·	9.9 km	MPC · JPL
48813	1997 WJ_{1}	—	November 19, 1997	Xinglong	SCAP	EOS	4.2 km	MPC · JPL
48814	1997 WF_{2}	—	November 23, 1997	Oizumi	T. Kobayashi	·	11 km	MPC · JPL
48815	1997 WA_{3}	—	November 23, 1997	Oizumi	T. Kobayashi	·	6.6 km	MPC · JPL
48816	1997 WP_{3}	—	November 19, 1997	Xinglong	SCAP	·	3.7 km	MPC · JPL
48817	1997 WV_{13}	—	November 21, 1997	Kitt Peak	Spacewatch	HYG	9.4 km	MPC · JPL
48818	1997 WE_{15}	—	November 23, 1997	Kitt Peak	Spacewatch	·	7.8 km	MPC · JPL
48819	1997 WB_{16}	—	November 25, 1997	Kitt Peak	Spacewatch	·	8.4 km	MPC · JPL
48820	1997 WW_{33}	—	November 29, 1997	Socorro	LINEAR	THM	7.5 km	MPC · JPL
48821	1997 WK_{35}	—	November 29, 1997	Socorro	LINEAR	·	7.7 km	MPC · JPL
48822	1997 WY_{35}	—	November 29, 1997	Socorro	LINEAR	EOS	4.8 km	MPC · JPL
48823	1997 WN_{36}	—	November 29, 1997	Socorro	LINEAR	·	13 km	MPC · JPL
48824	1997 WK_{38}	—	November 29, 1997	Socorro	LINEAR	·	7.2 km	MPC · JPL
48825	1997 WJ_{48}	—	November 26, 1997	Haleakala	NEAT	·	8.0 km	MPC · JPL
48826	1997 WQ_{54}	—	November 29, 1997	Socorro	LINEAR	THM	8.1 km	MPC · JPL
48827	1997 YB	—	December 18, 1997	Oizumi	T. Kobayashi	·	8.3 km	MPC · JPL
48828	1997 YU	—	December 20, 1997	Oizumi	T. Kobayashi	THM	8.1 km	MPC · JPL
48829	1997 YH_{1}	—	December 17, 1997	Xinglong	SCAP	EOS	5.7 km	MPC · JPL
48830	1997 YN_{2}	—	December 21, 1997	Oizumi	T. Kobayashi	·	9.9 km	MPC · JPL
48831	1997 YG_{3}	—	December 24, 1997	Oizumi	T. Kobayashi	EOS	6.6 km	MPC · JPL
48832	1997 YR_{3}	—	December 22, 1997	Xinglong	SCAP	·	17 km	MPC · JPL
48833	1997 YA_{5}	—	December 24, 1997	Woomera	F. B. Zoltowski	·	12 km	MPC · JPL
48834	1997 YZ_{6}	—	December 27, 1997	Haleakala	NEAT	H	1.7 km	MPC · JPL
48835	1997 YK_{18}	—	December 22, 1997	Xinglong	SCAP	EOS	6.1 km	MPC · JPL
48836	1998 AW	—	January 5, 1998	Oizumi	T. Kobayashi	·	11 km	MPC · JPL
48837	1998 AR_{6}	—	January 4, 1998	Xinglong	SCAP	CYB	9.3 km	MPC · JPL
48838 Markackermann	1998 AF_{10}	Markackermann	January 15, 1998	Caussols	ODAS	·	6.0 km	MPC · JPL
48839	1998 BZ_{1}	—	January 19, 1998	Uenohara	N. Kawasato	·	4.7 km	MPC · JPL
48840	1998 BR_{4}	—	January 17, 1998	Caussols	ODAS	·	11 km	MPC · JPL
48841	1998 BB_{19}	—	January 27, 1998	Sormano	A. Testa, Ghezzi, P.	·	12 km	MPC · JPL
48842 Alexmazzanti	1998 BA_{44}	Alexmazzanti	January 25, 1998	Cima Ekar	M. Tombelli, G. Forti	URS	17 km	MPC · JPL
48843	1998 BN_{44}	—	January 22, 1998	Socorro	LINEAR	EOS	9.7 km	MPC · JPL
48844 Belloves	1998 DW	Belloves	February 18, 1998	Kleť	M. Tichý, Z. Moravec	H	1.1 km	MPC · JPL
48845	1998 DW_{8}	—	February 23, 1998	Kitt Peak	Spacewatch	·	7.0 km	MPC · JPL
48846 Agnèsacker	1998 DC_{14}	Agnèsacker	February 27, 1998	Caussols	ODAS	·	1.9 km	MPC · JPL
48847	1998 EW_{6}	—	March 3, 1998	Caussols	ODAS	H	1.8 km	MPC · JPL
48848	1998 FD_{46}	—	March 20, 1998	Socorro	LINEAR	·	1.6 km	MPC · JPL
48849	1998 FW_{51}	—	March 20, 1998	Socorro	LINEAR	·	1.7 km	MPC · JPL
48850	1998 FL_{57}	—	March 20, 1998	Socorro	LINEAR	·	1.4 km	MPC · JPL
48851	1998 FA_{69}	—	March 20, 1998	Socorro	LINEAR	·	3.2 km	MPC · JPL
48852	1998 FL_{72}	—	March 20, 1998	Socorro	LINEAR	·	1.4 km	MPC · JPL
48853	1998 FN_{79}	—	March 24, 1998	Socorro	LINEAR	NYS	2.2 km	MPC · JPL
48854	1998 FY_{83}	—	March 24, 1998	Socorro	LINEAR	·	4.0 km	MPC · JPL
48855	1998 FH_{97}	—	March 31, 1998	Socorro	LINEAR	·	11 km	MPC · JPL
48856	1998 FO_{103}	—	March 31, 1998	Socorro	LINEAR	(2076)	3.7 km	MPC · JPL
48857	1998 FU_{133}	—	March 20, 1998	Socorro	LINEAR	EUN	2.9 km	MPC · JPL
48858	1998 HS_{3}	—	April 19, 1998	Kitt Peak	Spacewatch	·	2.9 km	MPC · JPL
48859	1998 HY_{13}	—	April 24, 1998	Kitt Peak	Spacewatch	·	1.6 km	MPC · JPL
48860	1998 HG_{24}	—	April 24, 1998	Majorca	Á. López J., R. Pacheco	·	2.2 km	MPC · JPL
48861	1998 HR_{24}	—	April 24, 1998	Višnjan Observatory	Višnjan	·	2.6 km	MPC · JPL
48862	1998 HE_{32}	—	April 20, 1998	Socorro	LINEAR	·	2.9 km	MPC · JPL
48863	1998 HY_{37}	—	April 20, 1998	Socorro	LINEAR	·	2.0 km	MPC · JPL
48864	1998 HK_{43}	—	April 25, 1998	Višnjan Observatory	Višnjan	·	2.3 km	MPC · JPL
48865	1998 HT_{46}	—	April 20, 1998	Socorro	LINEAR	·	4.0 km	MPC · JPL
48866	1998 HW_{50}	—	April 25, 1998	Anderson Mesa	LONEOS	·	3.1 km	MPC · JPL
48867	1998 HR_{67}	—	April 21, 1998	Socorro	LINEAR	·	3.6 km	MPC · JPL
48868	1998 HB_{92}	—	April 21, 1998	Socorro	LINEAR	·	1.6 km	MPC · JPL
48869	1998 HC_{92}	—	April 21, 1998	Socorro	LINEAR	·	1.8 km	MPC · JPL
48870	1998 HL_{93}	—	April 21, 1998	Socorro	LINEAR	·	2.3 km	MPC · JPL
48871	1998 HR_{97}	—	April 21, 1998	Socorro	LINEAR	·	1.9 km	MPC · JPL
48872	1998 HY_{98}	—	April 21, 1998	Socorro	LINEAR	·	3.7 km	MPC · JPL
48873	1998 HS_{99}	—	April 21, 1998	Socorro	LINEAR	·	1.9 km	MPC · JPL
48874	1998 HW_{100}	—	April 21, 1998	Socorro	LINEAR	·	1.8 km	MPC · JPL
48875	1998 HF_{102}	—	April 25, 1998	La Silla	E. W. Elst	·	2.0 km	MPC · JPL
48876	1998 HE_{103}	—	April 25, 1998	La Silla	E. W. Elst	·	4.8 km	MPC · JPL
48877	1998 HZ_{109}	—	April 23, 1998	Socorro	LINEAR	BAP	2.1 km	MPC · JPL
48878	1998 HQ_{118}	—	April 23, 1998	Socorro	LINEAR	INA	10 km	MPC · JPL
48879	1998 HR_{125}	—	April 23, 1998	Socorro	LINEAR	·	1.6 km	MPC · JPL
48880	1998 HU_{129}	—	April 19, 1998	Socorro	LINEAR	·	1.5 km	MPC · JPL
48881	1998 HS_{136}	—	April 20, 1998	Socorro	LINEAR	3:2	20 km	MPC · JPL
48882	1998 HJ_{139}	—	April 21, 1998	Socorro	LINEAR	·	1.5 km	MPC · JPL
48883	1998 HY_{147}	—	April 25, 1998	La Silla	E. W. Elst	·	1.9 km	MPC · JPL
48884	1998 HJ_{149}	—	April 25, 1998	La Silla	E. W. Elst	NYS	2.1 km	MPC · JPL
48885	1998 HY_{153}	—	April 27, 1998	Kitt Peak	Spacewatch	·	2.0 km	MPC · JPL
48886 Jonanderson	1998 JA_{4}	Jonanderson	May 7, 1998	Caussols	ODAS	·	2.0 km	MPC · JPL
48887	1998 KM_{4}	—	May 22, 1998	Anderson Mesa	LONEOS	·	2.2 km	MPC · JPL
48888 REXIS	1998 KR_{6}	REXIS	May 22, 1998	Anderson Mesa	LONEOS	·	1.8 km	MPC · JPL
48889	1998 KZ_{9}	—	May 24, 1998	Xinglong	SCAP	·	2.5 km	MPC · JPL
48890	1998 KC_{16}	—	May 22, 1998	Socorro	LINEAR	·	2.4 km	MPC · JPL
48891	1998 KM_{45}	—	May 22, 1998	Socorro	LINEAR	·	2.4 km	MPC · JPL
48892	1998 KA_{48}	—	May 22, 1998	Socorro	LINEAR	·	2.7 km	MPC · JPL
48893	1998 KM_{48}	—	May 22, 1998	Socorro	LINEAR	·	2.5 km	MPC · JPL
48894	1998 KR_{56}	—	May 22, 1998	Socorro	LINEAR	·	2.3 km	MPC · JPL
48895	1998 KU_{64}	—	May 22, 1998	Socorro	LINEAR	·	2.3 km	MPC · JPL
48896	1998 KT_{66}	—	May 22, 1998	Socorro	LINEAR	·	1.6 km	MPC · JPL
48897	1998 LQ_{2}	—	June 1, 1998	La Silla	E. W. Elst	·	1.3 km	MPC · JPL
48898	1998 MO_{5}	—	June 19, 1998	Socorro	LINEAR	PHO	4.8 km	MPC · JPL
48899	1998 MM_{7}	—	June 17, 1998	Woomera	F. B. Zoltowski	·	3.9 km	MPC · JPL
48900	1998 MP_{22}	—	June 24, 1998	Socorro	LINEAR	·	3.0 km	MPC · JPL

== 48901–49000 ==
back to top

Designation			Discovery			Properties		Ref
Permanent	Provisional	Named after	Date	Site	Discoverer(s)	Category	Diam.	Ref
48901	1998 MO_{31}	—	June 24, 1998	Socorro	LINEAR	·	2.4 km	MPC · JPL
48902	1998 MP_{31}	—	June 24, 1998	Socorro	LINEAR	·	3.2 km	MPC · JPL
48903	1998 MD_{32}	—	June 24, 1998	Socorro	LINEAR	·	2.9 km	MPC · JPL
48904	1998 ME_{34}	—	June 24, 1998	Socorro	LINEAR	·	2.5 km	MPC · JPL
48905	1998 MH_{34}	—	June 24, 1998	Socorro	LINEAR	·	2.0 km	MPC · JPL
48906	1998 MF_{36}	—	June 24, 1998	Socorro	LINEAR	V	1.8 km	MPC · JPL
48907	1998 MX_{36}	—	June 27, 1998	Kitt Peak	Spacewatch	·	3.1 km	MPC · JPL
48908	1998 MG_{40}	—	June 26, 1998	La Silla	E. W. Elst	·	2.5 km	MPC · JPL
48909 Laurake	1998 MK_{40}	Laurake	June 26, 1998	La Silla	E. W. Elst	·	1.7 km	MPC · JPL
48910	1998 MF_{48}	—	June 28, 1998	La Silla	E. W. Elst	NYS	2.7 km	MPC · JPL
48911	1998 MU_{48}	—	June 20, 1998	Haleakala	NEAT	·	3.1 km	MPC · JPL
48912	1998 OT_{1}	—	July 24, 1998	Prescott	P. G. Comba	·	2.7 km	MPC · JPL
48913	1998 OH_{2}	—	July 25, 1998	Prescott	P. G. Comba	·	4.4 km	MPC · JPL
48914	1998 OG_{4}	—	July 27, 1998	Caussols	ODAS	·	1.7 km	MPC · JPL
48915 Patbrandebourg	1998 OJ_{5}	Patbrandebourg	July 29, 1998	Caussols	ODAS	·	1.6 km	MPC · JPL
48916	1998 OR_{6}	—	July 26, 1998	Anderson Mesa	LONEOS	·	3.5 km	MPC · JPL
48917	1998 OS_{6}	—	July 26, 1998	Anderson Mesa	LONEOS	·	2.2 km	MPC · JPL
48918	1998 OP_{8}	—	July 26, 1998	La Silla	E. W. Elst	·	2.7 km	MPC · JPL
48919	1998 OU_{8}	—	July 26, 1998	La Silla	E. W. Elst	·	3.8 km	MPC · JPL
48920	1998 OE_{11}	—	July 26, 1998	La Silla	E. W. Elst	MAS	1.3 km	MPC · JPL
48921	1998 OK_{11}	—	July 26, 1998	La Silla	E. W. Elst	·	2.6 km	MPC · JPL
48922	1998 OQ_{11}	—	July 26, 1998	La Silla	E. W. Elst	NYS	1.7 km	MPC · JPL
48923	1998 OY_{11}	—	July 22, 1998	Reedy Creek	J. Broughton	NYS	3.1 km	MPC · JPL
48924	1998 OK_{12}	—	July 29, 1998	Reedy Creek	J. Broughton	V	2.5 km	MPC · JPL
48925	1998 ON_{12}	—	July 26, 1998	La Silla	E. W. Elst	NYS	4.4 km	MPC · JPL
48926	1998 OV_{13}	—	July 26, 1998	La Silla	E. W. Elst	·	2.5 km	MPC · JPL
48927	1998 OU_{14}	—	July 26, 1998	La Silla	E. W. Elst	·	5.9 km	MPC · JPL
48928	1998 PB	—	August 2, 1998	Anderson Mesa	LONEOS	PHO	2.7 km	MPC · JPL
48929	1998 PC	—	August 2, 1998	Anderson Mesa	LONEOS	·	2.2 km	MPC · JPL
48930	1998 PW	—	August 14, 1998	Woomera	F. B. Zoltowski	·	2.1 km	MPC · JPL
48931	1998 PM_{1}	—	August 10, 1998	Reedy Creek	J. Broughton	·	3.2 km	MPC · JPL
48932	1998 QB	—	August 17, 1998	Višnjan Observatory	Višnjan	V	2.7 km	MPC · JPL
48933	1998 QD	—	August 17, 1998	Prescott	P. G. Comba	NYS	2.2 km	MPC · JPL
48934 Kočanová	1998 QS	Kočanová	August 18, 1998	Modra	D. Kalmančok, Pravda, A.	NYS	2.5 km	MPC · JPL
48935	1998 QK_{1}	—	August 17, 1998	Višnjan Observatory	Višnjan	V	2.4 km	MPC · JPL
48936	1998 QS_{2}	—	August 20, 1998	Kitt Peak	Spacewatch	(883)	2.4 km	MPC · JPL
48937	1998 QN_{4}	—	August 21, 1998	Woomera	F. B. Zoltowski	·	4.9 km	MPC · JPL
48938	1998 QK_{5}	—	August 22, 1998	Xinglong	SCAP	·	2.0 km	MPC · JPL
48939	1998 QO_{8}	—	August 17, 1998	Socorro	LINEAR	V	2.0 km	MPC · JPL
48940	1998 QV_{8}	—	August 17, 1998	Socorro	LINEAR	·	5.1 km	MPC · JPL
48941	1998 QP_{11}	—	August 17, 1998	Socorro	LINEAR	·	3.9 km	MPC · JPL
48942	1998 QV_{11}	—	August 17, 1998	Socorro	LINEAR	·	2.7 km	MPC · JPL
48943	1998 QH_{12}	—	August 17, 1998	Socorro	LINEAR	·	2.0 km	MPC · JPL
48944	1998 QT_{13}	—	August 17, 1998	Socorro	LINEAR	·	1.9 km	MPC · JPL
48945	1998 QW_{13}	—	August 17, 1998	Socorro	LINEAR	NYS	2.6 km	MPC · JPL
48946	1998 QF_{14}	—	August 17, 1998	Socorro	LINEAR	·	2.6 km	MPC · JPL
48947	1998 QK_{14}	—	August 17, 1998	Socorro	LINEAR	·	4.3 km	MPC · JPL
48948	1998 QL_{14}	—	August 17, 1998	Socorro	LINEAR	·	3.2 km	MPC · JPL
48949	1998 QR_{16}	—	August 17, 1998	Socorro	LINEAR	·	2.7 km	MPC · JPL
48950	1998 QW_{17}	—	August 17, 1998	Socorro	LINEAR	·	2.7 km	MPC · JPL
48951	1998 QO_{19}	—	August 17, 1998	Socorro	LINEAR	·	2.0 km	MPC · JPL
48952	1998 QY_{19}	—	August 17, 1998	Socorro	LINEAR	·	2.4 km	MPC · JPL
48953	1998 QG_{20}	—	August 17, 1998	Socorro	LINEAR	·	2.4 km	MPC · JPL
48954	1998 QD_{21}	—	August 17, 1998	Socorro	LINEAR	·	4.2 km	MPC · JPL
48955	1998 QE_{23}	—	August 17, 1998	Socorro	LINEAR	NYS	3.8 km	MPC · JPL
48956	1998 QY_{23}	—	August 17, 1998	Socorro	LINEAR	V	1.7 km	MPC · JPL
48957	1998 QT_{24}	—	August 17, 1998	Socorro	LINEAR	·	2.0 km	MPC · JPL
48958	1998 QD_{26}	—	August 25, 1998	Višnjan Observatory	Višnjan	·	3.5 km	MPC · JPL
48959	1998 QQ_{26}	—	August 24, 1998	Reedy Creek	J. Broughton	NYS	4.2 km	MPC · JPL
48960 Clouet	1998 QR_{26}	Clouet	August 25, 1998	Blauvac	R. Roy	NYS	2.9 km	MPC · JPL
48961	1998 QS_{26}	—	August 22, 1998	Majorca	Á. López J., R. Pacheco	·	3.6 km	MPC · JPL
48962	1998 QH_{31}	—	August 17, 1998	Socorro	LINEAR	·	2.5 km	MPC · JPL
48963	1998 QJ_{33}	—	August 17, 1998	Socorro	LINEAR	V	2.1 km	MPC · JPL
48964	1998 QW_{33}	—	August 17, 1998	Socorro	LINEAR	·	2.8 km	MPC · JPL
48965	1998 QX_{34}	—	August 17, 1998	Socorro	LINEAR	·	3.3 km	MPC · JPL
48966	1998 QY_{34}	—	August 17, 1998	Socorro	LINEAR	·	3.9 km	MPC · JPL
48967	1998 QX_{36}	—	August 17, 1998	Socorro	LINEAR	·	2.2 km	MPC · JPL
48968	1998 QC_{38}	—	August 17, 1998	Socorro	LINEAR	V	2.8 km	MPC · JPL
48969	1998 QT_{38}	—	August 17, 1998	Socorro	LINEAR	·	2.7 km	MPC · JPL
48970	1998 QY_{38}	—	August 17, 1998	Socorro	LINEAR	·	2.2 km	MPC · JPL
48971	1998 QC_{39}	—	August 17, 1998	Socorro	LINEAR	NYS · fast	4.0 km	MPC · JPL
48972	1998 QM_{39}	—	August 17, 1998	Socorro	LINEAR	NYS	3.1 km	MPC · JPL
48973	1998 QO_{39}	—	August 17, 1998	Socorro	LINEAR	·	1.9 km	MPC · JPL
48974	1998 QS_{39}	—	August 17, 1998	Socorro	LINEAR	NYS	3.0 km	MPC · JPL
48975	1998 QH_{40}	—	August 17, 1998	Socorro	LINEAR	·	4.8 km	MPC · JPL
48976	1998 QN_{40}	—	August 17, 1998	Socorro	LINEAR	·	4.6 km	MPC · JPL
48977	1998 QO_{40}	—	August 17, 1998	Socorro	LINEAR	V	2.3 km	MPC · JPL
48978	1998 QU_{40}	—	August 17, 1998	Socorro	LINEAR	RAF	3.4 km	MPC · JPL
48979	1998 QZ_{40}	—	August 17, 1998	Socorro	LINEAR	·	3.1 km	MPC · JPL
48980	1998 QK_{43}	—	August 17, 1998	Socorro	LINEAR	·	5.5 km	MPC · JPL
48981	1998 QD_{45}	—	August 17, 1998	Socorro	LINEAR	V	3.7 km	MPC · JPL
48982	1998 QL_{46}	—	August 17, 1998	Socorro	LINEAR	MAR	3.7 km	MPC · JPL
48983	1998 QM_{46}	—	August 17, 1998	Socorro	LINEAR	·	4.1 km	MPC · JPL
48984	1998 QC_{47}	—	August 17, 1998	Socorro	LINEAR	NYS	3.3 km	MPC · JPL
48985	1998 QF_{47}	—	August 17, 1998	Socorro	LINEAR	PHO	3.3 km	MPC · JPL
48986	1998 QJ_{47}	—	August 17, 1998	Socorro	LINEAR	·	3.2 km	MPC · JPL
48987	1998 QL_{47}	—	August 17, 1998	Socorro	LINEAR	·	2.7 km	MPC · JPL
48988	1998 QR_{47}	—	August 17, 1998	Socorro	LINEAR	NYS	3.8 km	MPC · JPL
48989	1998 QS_{47}	—	August 17, 1998	Socorro	LINEAR	·	3.0 km	MPC · JPL
48990	1998 QX_{47}	—	August 17, 1998	Socorro	LINEAR	ERI	3.3 km	MPC · JPL
48991	1998 QY_{47}	—	August 17, 1998	Socorro	LINEAR	V	2.0 km	MPC · JPL
48992	1998 QC_{48}	—	August 17, 1998	Socorro	LINEAR	·	3.8 km	MPC · JPL
48993	1998 QF_{48}	—	August 17, 1998	Socorro	LINEAR	V	2.7 km	MPC · JPL
48994	1998 QL_{50}	—	August 17, 1998	Socorro	LINEAR	·	2.0 km	MPC · JPL
48995	1998 QC_{51}	—	August 17, 1998	Socorro	LINEAR	·	2.7 km	MPC · JPL
48996	1998 QK_{51}	—	August 17, 1998	Socorro	LINEAR	·	2.4 km	MPC · JPL
48997	1998 QT_{51}	—	August 17, 1998	Socorro	LINEAR	V	3.5 km	MPC · JPL
48998	1998 QV_{51}	—	August 17, 1998	Socorro	LINEAR	·	5.3 km	MPC · JPL
48999	1998 QM_{52}	—	August 17, 1998	Socorro	LINEAR	V	2.4 km	MPC · JPL
49000	1998 QY_{52}	—	August 20, 1998	Anderson Mesa	LONEOS	·	2.5 km	MPC · JPL

back to top

== See also ==
- Meanings of minor-planet names: 48001–49000
