= Obermayer =

Obermayer may refer to:

== People ==
- Arthur S. Obermayer (1931 – 2016), American businessman and philanthropist
- Bastian Obermayer (born 1977), Pulitzer Prize-winning German investigative journalist
- Erich Obermayer (born 1953), Austrian football player
- Herman Obermayer (1924 – 2016), American publisher and politician

== Other ==
- Obermayer German Jewish History Awards.
- Obermaier
- Obermeyer
