= Hans Krieger =

German writer (1933–2023)

- Hans Krieger, c. 2000
- Born: 13 March 1933; Frankfurt, Hesse-Nassau, Prussia, Germany
- Died: 9 January 2023 (aged 89); Landshut, Bavaria, Germany
- Occupations: Writer; Journalist; Broadcaster; Poet
- Organizations: Bayerischer Rundfunk; Die Zeit

Hans Krieger (13 March 1933 – 9 January 2023) was a German writer, essayist, journalist of influential weekly papers such as Die Zeit, broadcaster and poet.

== Life ==
Born in Frankfurt, Krieger studied German and Romance studies at Goethe University Frankfurt, LMU Munich, and the University of Dijon. From 1963 to 1998, he was cultural editor and director of the arts section of the weekly Bayerische Staatszeitung (Bavarian State newspaper). Krieger wrote poetry, essays, cultural criticism, theater and art reviews, translated books from French and taught theatre criticism at LMU Munich. He has authored numerous papers and radio journalism for the Bavarian radio, Bayerischer Rundfunk, and literary and nonfiction reviews in the newspapers Die Zeit and the Süddeutsche Zeitung, among others. He was an influential reviewer of books and authors, such as Wilhelm Reich, Alice Miller, Arthur Janov, Arno Gruen and Otto Mainzer.

Krieger was married to the artist Christine Rieck-Sonntag. They lived in Landshut, where he died on 9 January 2023, at the age of 89.

=== German orthography ===
Since 1963, Krieger was active in discussions to reform German orthography. He fought the German orthography reform of 1996. His book Der Rechtschreibschwindel – Zwischenrufe zu einem absurden Reformtheater ("The Orthography Fraud – Heckling in the Theater of Absurd Reform"), (Note: Krieger's books and articles are in German only; titles translated for reference.) first published in 1998 and expanded in 2000, is a collection of essays on the topic, in print and broadcast, from 1971 to 2000. In 2003, he was co-author of the book Deutsch. Eine Sprache wird beschädigt ("German. A Language Gets Damaged"), illustrated by Paul Flora. In 2004, he was a co-founder of the independent association "Rat für deutsche Rechtschreibung" (Council for German Orthography) and became its president. (Note: There are two organizations with this name, the international regulating body and an association in Munich, founded on 22 August 2004. Krieger is a co-founder of the association in Munich.) He was one of the 100 authors who signed an appeal to withdraw the 1996 orthography change, alongside Günter Grass, Martin Walser and Ralph Giordano. Krieger was from 1999 to 2002 president of the Stiftung zur Förderung des Schrifttums (Foundation for the Advancement of Writing) in Munich, which was founded by Friedrich Märker and has awarded the Friedrich-Märker-Preis for essays since 1986. Krieger himself received the prize in 1997.

=== Lyric poetry ===
From 1993, Krieger published six volumes of poetry, commenting: "Gedichte sind Musik aus Worten" ("poems are music [made] from words"). A review of the Süddeutsche Zeitung called his poems "leicht und schwer zugleich" ("simultaneously light and heavy"). His collection of poems, Frei wie die Zäune – eine Saison in Virginia ("Free as Fences – A Season in Virginia"), reflects on his two-month stay in the United States. Topics are, among others, the treatment of Native American Indians, slavery and the wars of the 20th century, summarized by a review in the Nürnberger Nachrichten as "Die dunkle Seite der politischen US-Seele" (The dark side of the political U.S. soul).

=== Illustrations and music ===
Krieger's poems inspired Christine Rieck-Sonntag to illustrations. Composer Graham Waterhouse set a selection from Das Asphalt-Zebra. Animalphabetische Verse for cello and speaking voice, titled Animalia. He wrote Im Gebirg (In the mountains) on a poem of Krieger for mezzo-soprano, alto flute, cello and piano, premiered at the Gasteig in 2010 by Martina Koppelstetter, Jens Josef, the composer and Christopher White. Krieger wrote the text for a Christmas cantata which was first performed in Schloss Borbeck in Essen on 4 December 2011. The central idea of Der Anfang einer neuen Zeit (The beginning of a new time) is derived from the thought by Angelus Silesius: "Wird Christus tausendmal zu Bethlehem geborn / und nicht in dir; du bleibst noch ewiglich verlorn." ("If Christ were born in Bethlehem a thousand times and not in thee thyself; then art thou lost eternally", from The Cherubinic Pilgrim, I, 61).

== Publications ==
=== Poems ===
- Gottverdauen – Ein Stimmengewirr, poems (1993)
- Im Schattenschwarz deines Haars – Tag und Nacht der Liebe, poems (1995)
- Der Rechtschreib-Schwindel – Zwischenrufe zu einem absurden Reformtheater (1998/2000)
- Liedschattig, CD of poems (2000)
- Blinzelblicke – Ein Frühjahr in Manhattan, poems (2002, Arcos-Verlag)
- Wortschritte – Über Kunst und Politik, über Gott und die Welt, essays (2003)
- Liedschattig, poems (2004, Oreos-Verlag)
- Frei wie die Zäune – Eine Saison in Virginia, poems (2005)
- Das Asphalt-Zebra, Animalphabetische Verse, poems on animals in alphabetic order (2006)
- Nachtflügel, poems (2007, Oreos-Verlag)
- Apfelfall, poems (2010)

=== Short story ===
- Kunstbrand with drawings by Christine Rieck-Sonntag. München: Verlag Sankt Michaelsbund, 2009, 112 p, ISBN 978-3-939905-39-4

=== Selected articles ===
- In der Einsamkeit des Gehirns – Maria Erlenbergers Bericht vom Ort des Wahnsinns (In the loneliness of a brain – Maria Erlenberger's report from the location of insanity), Die Zeit, No. 15, 1977
- Reise ins Bodenlose – Ein Autor ist zu entdecken: Ernst-Jürgen Dreyer (Journey to the bottomless – An author to be discovered: Ernst-Jürgen Dreyer), Die Zeit, No. 37, p. 45, 1980
- Partisan der Liebe (Partisan of love), about Otto Mainzer, Die Zeit, 28 May 1982
- Zehetmairs Mut und Chance – Der Ex-Kultusminister soll den Rechtschreib-Frieden stiften. (Zehetmairs courage and chance – The former cultural minister shall bring orthography-peace), Bayerische Staatszeitung, edition 50, 10 December 2004
