= Obermeyer =

Obermeyer is a family name in German speaking regions. Its bearers include:

- Jacob Obermeyer (1845–1938), Bavarian Jewish Orientalist scholar and traveler
- Klaus Obermeyer (born 1919), German-born American businessman

== See also ==
- Obermaier
- 9236 Obermair, asteroid discovered by Erich Meyer and named in Erwin Obermair honor
- Erwin Obermair, Austrian amateur astronomer and discoverer of asteroids (1946)
- Erich Obermayer, former Austrian football player (1953)
- Leopold Obermayer, Homosexual Jew of Swiss nationality, victim of Nazism (1892-1943)
- Franz Obermayr, Austrian Member of the European Parliament (1952)
- Siegfried Obermeier, German author of popular historical novels and history books (1936-2011)
