= Obermaier =

Obermaier is a surname. Notable people with the surname include:

- Albrecht Obermaier (1912–2004), German naval officer
- Frederik Obermaier (born 1984), German investigative journalist
- Hugo Obermaier (1877–1946), German prehistorian and anthropologist
- Ottmar Obermaier (1883-1965), German sculptor
- Otto G. Obermaier (born 1936), United States Attorney for the Southern District of New York
- Stefan Obermaier (born 1981), Austrian musician, producer and DJ
- Uschi Obermaier (born 1946), German model and actress, associated with the 1968 left-wing movement

== See also ==
- Obermaier DF02, German autogyro, designed and produced by GyroTec Michael Obermaier
- Obermaier Racing, a German sportscar racing team
- Obermeyer
- 9236 Obermair, asteroid discovered by Erich Meyer and named in Erwin Obermair's honor
- Erwin Obermair, Austrian amateur astronomer and discoverer of asteroids
- Erich Obermayer, Ausian football player
- Franz Obermayr, Austrian Member of the European Parliament
- Siegfried Obermeier, German author of popular historical novels and history books
