= Paul Flora =

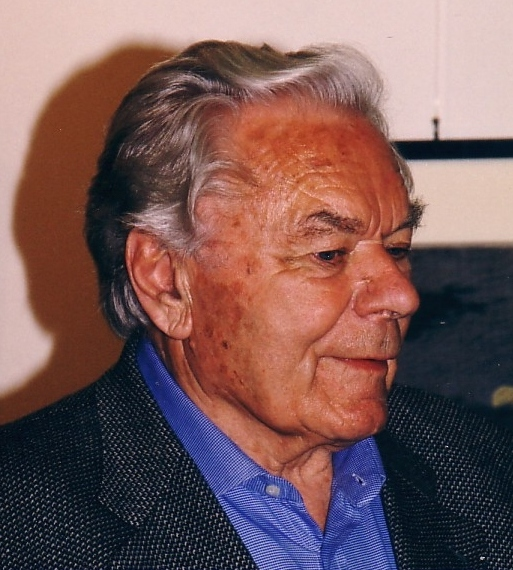
- Paul Flora, 2005
- Born: Paul Flora; 29 June 1922; Glurns, South Tyrol
- Died: 15 May 2009 (aged 86); Innsbruck, Austria
- Known for: Painter / Cartoonist
- Notable work: Wagner auf germanischer Sphinx, Wintergestrüpp, Geist und Fleisch, Die Gletscherspalte
- Awards: E.O.Plauen-Preis, Plauen 1999, Premio internazionale Asiago d'Arte Filatelica 1986, Ehrenbürger der Stadt Glurns 1992, Ehrenbürger der Stadt Innsbruck 2002

Paul Flora (6 June 1922 – 15 May 2009) was an Austrian caricaturist, graphic artist, and illustrator, known for his black ink line drawings. "Flora was one of Europe's most profiled illustrators since the 1960s. He worked for British newspapers The Times and The Observer as well as for Germany's Die Zeit".

== Career ==
Flora was born in Glurns, South Tyrol. The young artist spent his formative years in Bavaria, Germany. From 1942 to 1944 Flora studied at the Academy of Fine Arts Munich under the Norwegian draftsman and painter Olaf Gulbransson, who worked for the political magazine Simplicissimus.

"To many observers of the Austrian and German art scene, Paul Flora appears to have weathered many storms on his stony path to becoming well known for his characteristic black ink line drawings. Living in Tyrol, where it is almost impossible for an artist to earn a living solely by selling his artwork, he was one of the few who had achieved sustained success". (R. H. Sachsenmaier: "Paul Flora". In Sast Report, 2013)

He died on 15 May 2009 in Innsbruck and was buried in his hometown Glurns.

== Honors ==
Asteroid 85411 Paulflora, discovered by Erich Meyer and Erwin Obermair in 1996, was named in his honor. The official naming citation was published by the Minor Planet Center on 30 July 2007 (M.P.C. 60301).

== Exhibitions in museums ==
- 1950: Biennale in Venedig
- 1952: Landesmuseum Ferdinandeum, Innsbruck
- 1956: Secession, Vienna
- 1959: Kunsthalle Bremen und Maison de France, Berlin
- 1963: Wilhelm Busch Museum, Hannover
- 1966: Biennale in Venedig
- 1972: Suermont Museum, Aachen
- 1974: Folkwang Museum, Essen
- 1979: Museum Nymwegen
- 1984: Museum für Kunst und Gewerbe, Hamburg
- 1989: Albrecht-Dürer-Haus, Nürnberg
- 1992: Historisches Museum, Vienna
- 1993: Museion, Bozen
- 1997: Bayerische Akademie der schönen Künste, Munich
- 2002: Palais Esplanade, Meran
- 2002: Palais Harrach, Vienna
- 2021: Abertina, Vienna

== Films ==
- Die Raben von San Marco
- Floras Fauna
- Ein Fischer im Drüben
- Ein Abenteurer im Schlafrock
- Auf dem Strich – Paul Flora im Film 2007
