= Herbert Raab =

Austrian software engineer and amateur astronomer

Asteroids discovered: 4
9097 Davidschlag ^{1} ^{2}	14 January 1996	MPC
9119 Georgpeuerbach ^{1} ^{2}	18 February 1998	MPC
13682 Pressberger ^{1}	10 August 1997	MPC
175730 Gramastetten ^{1} ^{2}	18 February 1998	MPC
co-discovered with E. Meyer : [1]
co-discovered with E. Obermair : [2]

Herbert Raab (born 24 January 1969 in Linz, Austria) is an Austrian software engineer, amateur astronomer and discoverer of astronomical objects.

== Biography ==
Raab finished his studies of computer science at the Johannes Kepler University of Linz in 1995 as a graduate engineer. In 2012, he received the Master of Science in Management for Engineers at the LIMAK business school in Linz, where he also graduated as Master of Business Administration in 2013. He works as a software engineer in the field of commercial software.

In 1983, he joined the Astronomical Society of Linz (German: Linzer Astronomische Gemeinschaft), and has been president of the society from 1996 until 2017. Since 1990, he has been developing the widely used software Astrometrica, which is used for astrometric and photometric analysis of images of asteroids and comets. Raab's most important observations include precise astrometry of the comet Shoemaker–Levy 9, which he observed together with Erich Meyer and Erwin Obermair in 1993. These observations have significantly contributed to the subsequent prediction of the impact of this comet on the planet Jupiter.

On 10 August 1997, he discovered the asteroid 13682 Pressberger together with Erich Meyer at the private observatory Meyer/Obermair in Davidschlag (municipality Kirchschlag bei Linz, Austria). Furthermore, he was involved in three other discoveries of asteroids which were assigned as site discoveries to the observatory Davidschlag by the International Astronomical Union (see Category:Discoveries by the Davidschlag Observatory). During the Occultation of the star HIP 76293 by the asteroid 1177 Gonnessia on 18 May 2007, Raab discovered that the star is a close double star, whose components have a separation of just 0.04".

In May 1996, asteroid 3184 Raab was named in his honor, following a proposal of Brian G. Marsden and Gareth V. Williams from the Minor Planet Center (M.P.C. 27124). On 4 April 1997, Raab was presented the Gold Medal for Services to the Republic of Austria.

His wife Agnes Raab (born 1969) is also an amateur astronomer and long-time member of the Astronomical Society of Linz. In early 2004, asteroid 49109 Agnesraab, was named after her.
