= Stih & Schnock =

German art duo

Stih & Schnock is a German artist duo based in Berlin. It was formed by Renata Stih, a professor at the Berlin University of Applied Sciences and chair of Berlin's art in public space advisory commission, and Frieder Schnock, a former curator at the Museum Fridericianum in Kassel and head of education at Berlin's artists association. Their works deal primarily with collective memory in society. The Holocaust is a recurring reference for their artistic interventions.

Stih & Schnock are frequent lecturers and visiting professors primarily in the United States. Their works have been exhibited at the Staatsgalerie Stuttgart, the Museum of Art Fort Lauderdale, the Jewish Museum of New York, the Museum London (Ontario)], the Saint Louis Art Museum, and the Boca Raton Museum of Art.

In 2015 Stih & Schnock were honored as Distinguished Service Awardees by the Obermayer German Jewish History Awards.

== Select list of works ==
- 1992–93: Places of Remembrance (Memorial in the Bavarian Quarter, Berlin-Schöneberg)
- 1994–95: Bus Stop (project for the Holocaust Memorial in Berlin)
- 2005: Rosa I, Rosa II, Rosa III (Rosa Luxemburg Memorial Project, Berlin-Mitte)
- 2005: Sarajevo - Living On
- 2006–7: The City as Text—Jewish Munich
- 2008: Show Your Collection
- 2011: Time Islands (Nelson-Mandela-School, Berlin-Wilmersdorf)
- 2015–16: Rosie Won the War (Women at the homefront in the U.S. during World War II)
