= Martina Koppelstetter =

German opera singer

- Education: Musikhochschule München
- Occupation: Classical mezzo-soprano
- Organization: Staatstheater am Gärtnerplatz

Martina Koppelstetter is a German mezzo-soprano in opera and concert. She is particularly interested in contemporary music.

== Career ==
Born in Lower Bavaria, she enrolled at the Musikhochschule München in 1983, graduating with distinction in 1990. She made her debuts in Frankfurt and Munich under Enoch zu Guttenberg and performed at venues such as the Tiroler Landestheater Innsbruck and the Stadttheater Hildesheim. She was a member of the ensemble of the Staatstheater am Gärtnerplatz in Munich from 2003 to 2007, where she appeared as Dorabella in Mozart's Così fan tutte, Lola in Cavalleria rusticana, as Tisbe in Aschenputtel, as Flora Bervoix in La Traviata, and as Frau Reich in Die lustigen Weiber von Windsor, among others. With the ensemble cosifacciamo, she appeared in 2002 as Ottavia in Monteverdi's L'incoronazione di Poppea 2002, in 2008 as Messagera and Proserpina in his L'Orfeo. She also appeared at festivals such as the Rheingau Musik Festival, the MDR Musiksommer and the Bath International Music Festival. Koppelstetter has earned critical praise for her Lieder recitals in particular.

=== Contemporary music ===
She is interested in contemporary music and has performed at the Münchener Biennale and the festival A*Devantgarde. She has participated in concerts of the series musica viva of the station Bayerischer Rundfunk (br) and the series "Das neue Werk" (The new work) of the Norddeutscher Rundfunk. In 1992, she was a soloist in the premiere of Volker David Kirchner's Symphony No. 2 Mythen, a commission of the Rheingau Musik Festival for Michael Herrmann, performed by the Staatsphilharmonie Rheinland-Pfalz, conducted by Bernhard Klee. She recorded several songs and song cycles by Rudi Spring for the br, including Galgenliederbuch (after Christian Morgenstern) and Weltflucht (after Else Lasker-Schüler. In 2006, she sang the part of Hilde Mack in Henze's Elegie für junge Liebende in a concert performance of the Theater am Gärtnerplatz, to celebrate the composer's 80th birthday. In 2010, she premiered the song Im Gebirg (The Mountain) by Graham Waterhouse on a poem by Hans Krieger at the Gasteig with Jens Josef (alto flute), the composer (cello) and Christopher White (piano).

=== Selected recordings ===
In 1992, she recorded Bach's Mass in B minor with the Slovak Philharmonic Chorus and the Capella Istropolitana, conducted by Christian Brembeck. Her recordings also include the Missa a due chori by Johann Ernst Eberlin and the Kemptener Te Deum by Franz Xaver Richter. She recorded Bernhard Lang's 2003 song cycle DW 15 (DW short for "Differenz / Wiederholung", "Difference / Repetition").
