= Jens Josef =

German composer and flutist (born 1967)

- Born: 5 August 1967 (age 58); Solingen, Germany
- Education: Musikhochschule Frankfurt
- Occupations: Composer; flutist
- Years active: 1992–present
- Website: www.jensjosef.de

Jens Josef (born 5 August 1967) is a German composer of classical music, a flutist and academic teacher.

== Career ==
Born in Solingen-Ohligs, Josef received flute instructions from Rita Eggenweiler and Klaus Grünow, principal flute of the Staatstheater Kassel, and took composition classes with Jörn Tegtmeyer, the director of church music of Hann. Münden.

From 1989 to 1997 Josef studied at the Musikhochschule Frankfurt, flute with Peter Brock and Paul Dahme, and composition with Gerhard Müller-Hornbach. He finished his examinations in 1995, his concert examinations in 1997. He also studied flute with András Adorján and composition with Rainer Kunad.

He was a member of the Norddeutsche Philharmonie in Rostock in 1992/93, and the flutist of the orchestra Saitensprünge in 1994/95. He has worked as a freelance artist, flutist, composer, teacher, and conductor. in 1997 he founded the ensemble Gruppe Kontraste together with Christian Ridil. In 1998 he was principal flute of the Junge Philharmonie Hessen-Thüringen. He has collaborated with the Mutare Ensemble in Frankfurt.

Josef was a teacher at the Akademie für Tonkunst in Darmstadt from 2000 to 2006, and at the Musikhochschule Frankfurt from 2003 to 2006. He has been a teacher of the Musikakademie Kassel since 2006. He has participated in the educational project Ohrwurm-Projekt, a music project aiming at elementary school children.

His oratorio Vor langer Zeit. Stationen einer Stadt for speaker, two sopranos, baritone and ensemble, was premiered in 2000 in the Blasiuskirche, Hann. Münden.

The ensemble La Picassola commissioned him to write a piece for their first concert. He composed Musik für Flöte(n), Viola und Kontrabass nach dem Bild von Pablo Picasso "Bildnis seiner kleinen Tochter" (2001) (music for flute(s), viola and double bass inspired by Picasso's portrait of his little daughter) in four movements, premiered in the Foyer of the Hessisches Staatstheater Wiesbaden.

That same year Josef arranged Schubert's Winterreise for tenor and string quartet. It was recorded by Christian Elsner and the Henschel Quartet in 2002, and performed in 2004 by Peter Schreier and the Dresdner Streichquartett.

He played the flute in a trio concert at the Gasteig, with Rudi Spring (piano) and Graham Waterhouse (cello), performing Martinů's trio and the premiere of the flute version of Gestural Variations; every composer contributed a Christmas carol, Josef set "Süßer die Glocken nie klingen". In 2010 he was the alto flutist in the premiere there of the song Im Gebirg (The Mountain) by Waterhouse on a poem by Hans Krieger, with Martina Koppelstetter (mezzo-soprano), the composer and Christopher White (piano).

Josef's chamber music is recorded on a composer portrait CD Kammermusik, including Fünf Chansons nach Texten von François Villon (for soprano, flute, clarinet and percussion), 26.6.1626 (concertante scene no. 2 for baritone, flute, violin, bassoon and piano), Bizarrerien (three songs and two intermezzi for soprano, alto flute and guitar), and the Musik für Flöte(n), Viola und Kontrabass, played by La Picassola.
