= 3184 Raab =

Main-belt asteroid

Discovery
- Discovered by: Ernest Johnson
- Discovery site: Johannesburg Obs.
- Discovery date: 22 August 1949

Designations
- Named after: Herbert Raab (Austrian astronomer)
- Alternative designations: 1949 QC · 1970 GR_{1} 1975 SG · 1980 WF_{1}
- Minor planet category: main-belt · (middle) background

Orbital characteristics
- Epoch 23 March 2018 (JD 2458200.5)
- Uncertainty parameter 0
- Observation arc: 68.41 yr (24,988 d)
- Aphelion: 3.3689 AU
- Perihelion: 1.9689 AU
- Semi-major axis: 2.6689 AU
- Eccentricity: 0.2623
- Orbital period (sidereal): 4.36 yr (1,593 d)
- Mean anomaly: 269.05°
- Mean motion: 0° 13^{m} 33.96^{s} / day
- Inclination: 8.1951°
- Longitude of ascending node: 97.111°
- Argument of perihelion: 238.00°

Physical characteristics
- Mean diameter: 13.25 km (calculated); 15.28±5.62 km 17.49±0.28 km 17.638±0.108 km 18.38±7.54 km 19.280±0.060 km
- Synodic rotation period: 274.944±2.9899 h
- Geometric albedo: 0.036±0.004; 0.0470±0.0041; 0.05±0.04; 0.065±0.070; 0.086±0.003; 0.10 (generic)
- Spectral type: C/S (generic)
- Absolute magnitude (H): 12.056±0.002 (R); 12.10; 12.11±0.30; 12.2; 12.46; 12.51; 12.67

3184 Raab, provisional designation 1949 QC, is a dark background asteroid and a potentially slow rotator from the central regions of the asteroid belt, approximately 17 kilometers (11 miles) in diameter. It was discovered on 22 August 1949, by South African astronomer Ernest Leonard Johnson at the Union Observatory in Johannesburg. The likely C-type asteroid could have a long rotation period of 275 hours. It was named after Austrian amateur astronomer and software engineer Herbert Raab.

== Orbit and classification ==
Raab is a non-family asteroid from the main belt's background population. It orbits the Sun in the central main-belt at a distance of 2.0–3.4 AU once every 4 years and 4 months (1,593 days; semi-major axis of 2.67 AU). Its orbit has an eccentricity of 0.26 and an inclination of 8° with respect to the ecliptic. The body's observation arc begins with its official discovery observation at Johannesburg in August 1949.

== Physical characteristics ==
This asteroid's spectral type is unknown. Based on its low albedo, measured by the Wide-field Infrared Survey Explorer (WISE), Raab is possibly C-type asteroid.

=== Rotation period ===
In December 2011, a rotational lightcurve of Raab was obtained from photometric observations in the R-band by astronomers at the Palomar Transient Factory in California. Lightcurve analysis gave a rotation period of 274.944 hours with a brightness amplitude of 0.09 magnitude. However, the lightcurve is only fragmentary and could be completely wrong (U=1). This makes Raab only a potentially slow rotator rather than a confirmed one. As of 2018, no follow up observations have been published.

=== Diameter and albedo ===
According to the surveys carried out by the Japanese Akari satellite and the NEOWISE mission of NASA's WISE telesecope, Raab measures between 15.28 and 19.280 kilometers in diameter and its surface has an albedo between 0.036 and 0.086.

The Collaborative Asteroid Lightcurve Link assumes an albedo of 0.10 – used as a generic compromise between the stony (0.20) and carbonaceous (0.057) asteroids with semi-major axis between 2.6 and 2.7 AU – and consequently calculates a shorter diameter of 13.25 kilometers using on an absolute magnitude of 12.51.

== Naming ==
This minor planet was named after Austrian amateur astronomer and software engineer Herbert Raab (born 1969), who developed the astrometric software "Astrometrica". The official naming citation was published by the Minor Planet Center on 3 May 1996 (M.P.C. 27124), following a proposal by Brian Marsden and Gareth Williams.
