= Christoph Dieckmann (writer) =

German journalist, commentator and author

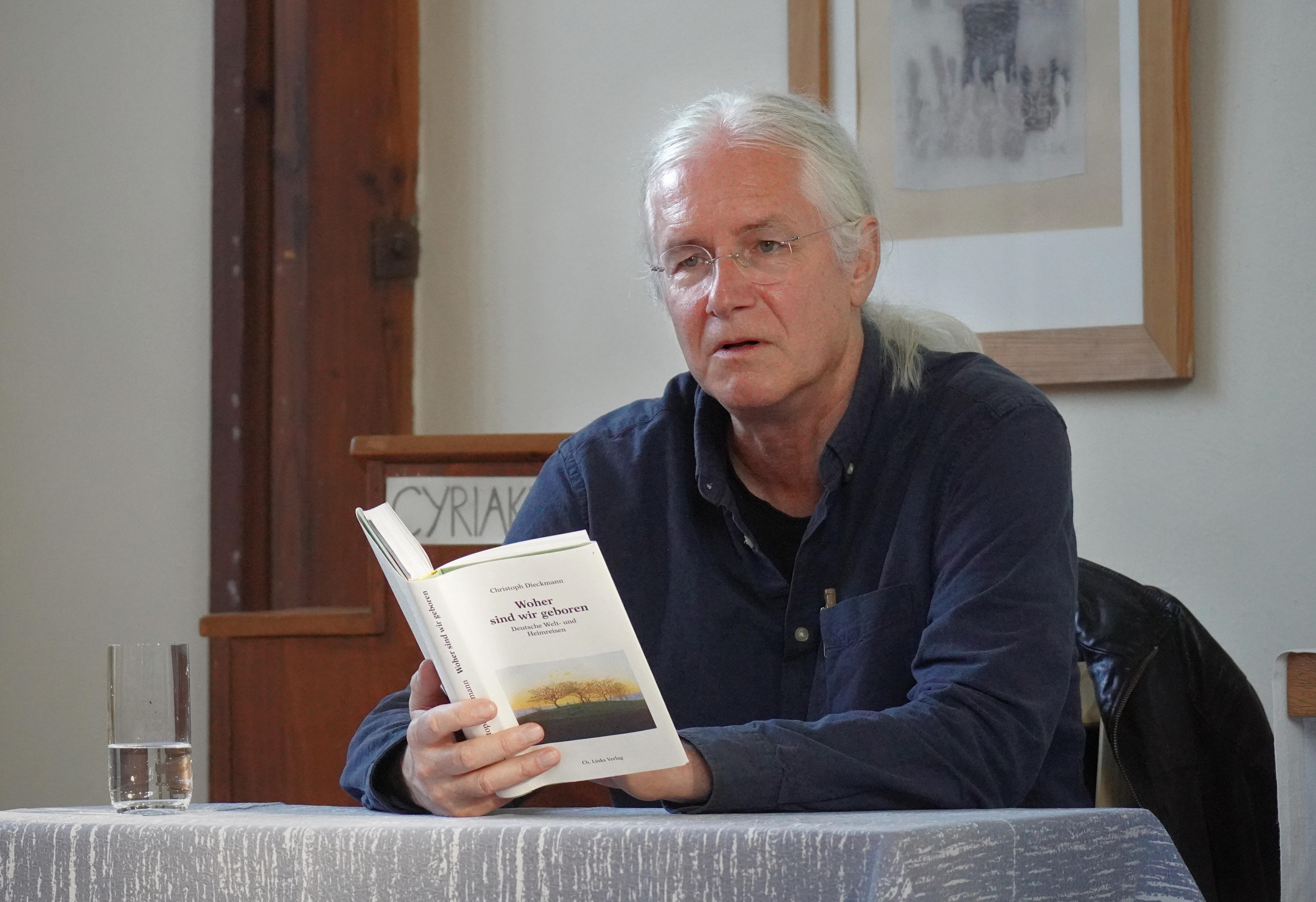
Christoph Dieckmann

Christoph Dieckmann (born 22 January 1956) is a German journalist, commentator and author. Before 1990 he grew up and, as a young man, built his career in the German Democratic Republic (East Germany): much of his most thoughtful writing continues to relate to those times, along with the tensions and frictions that still resonate from the division of Germany between 1949 and 1990.

== Biography ==
Christoph Dieckmann was born in Rathenow, a small town in the flat lands to the west of Potsdam and Berlin. He was the middle child of three brothers. Hans-Joachim Dieckmann, his father, was a Lutheran pastor, a man of strong principle who never allowed himself or his family to be seduced by the party's "socialist" group-think. His mother, Annelies, was a teacher. He grew up in the Harz region, first in the little village Dingelstedt am Huy (west of Magdeburg) and later in Sangerhausen. His father remained networked with Lutheran pastors in and around East Berlin. As a result of these contacts, when in 1990 Christoph Dieckmann, by this time an ambitious young journalist, needed to improve his English fast, he was tutored by Herlind Kasner (born Herlind Jentzsch), a retired English teacher at the East Berlin Missionary House. His teacher and her husband, the pastor Horst Kasner, are the parents of Angela Merkel.

As a teenager, he was prevented from taking his school exit exam (Abitur), which was a prerequisite for university studies. When the family had lived in the little village of Dingelstedt am Huy the fact that the pastor's son never joined the Free German Youth ("Freie Deutsche Jugend" / Young Communists) or the "Ernst Thälmann Pioneer Organisation" was not an issue. "Christoph does not belong to the socialist youth association", his teacher had written to his mother, "but he never stands aside when it's a question of working together." (Note: "Christoph gehört nicht dem sozialistischen Jugendverband an, aber stand nie abseits, wenn es galt gemeinsam zu schaffen") Things were different when the family moved to Sangerhausen, which was (and is) a town, and where the party was evidently more omnipresent. The education officer at the school refused him permission to take part in the Abitur exams, despite positive recommendations and good grades.

With no prospect of moving on to university, in 1972 Dieckmann embarked on a traineeship at the Langenau film academy as a cine-projectionist. In 1974, shortly before he was due to sit for final exams, he was expelled from the college on "disciplinary grounds", however. The exam was postponed by a year, but he passed it in 1975. He then moved on to study theology at the Theological Seminar in Leipzig, where he remained till 1978. Between 1978 and 1981 he continued his studies at the "Sprachenkonvikt" / "Latin convictorium" in East Berlin. His room at this theological academy here gave him a good view over the wall which since August 1961 had separated the "Sprachenkonvikt" from the Ecclesiastical Academy at Berlin-Zehlendorf of which it had formerly been an affiliate.

His theological training concluded, Dieckmann became "vicar" to the Evangelical student community of East Berlin and Berlin-Buch. After that, between 1983 and 1986 he worked in the theological studies department of the East German Association of Evangelical churches. Then, until 1990, he was employed as the ecclesiastical media officer at the Ecumenical Missionary Centre and Berlin Mission Society. His first reports and essays covered topics such as rock music, literature and "life" during the final years of the German Democratic Republic. At this point his work appeared chiefly in church newspapers and in the weekly newspaper Sonntag ("Sunday"). (The newspaper continued to publish his contributions after Autumn/Fall 1990 when it was sold, rebranded and relaunched as Freitag ("Friday").) By this time he was primarily supporting himself as a freelance author-journalist.

In 1990, through great good fortune (according to his own assessment) Dieckmann, a 34-year-old theologian with uncertain career prospects, received a stipendium from the World Press Institute which enabled him to spend six months in the United States of America. The package even included a viewing visit to the White House. He wrote about his impressions for the weekly newspaper Sonntag, and later published a book entitled "Oh! Great! Wonderful! – Anfänger in Amerika" (...a "beginner in America"). 1990 was Reunification Year, and Dieckmann's public profile in what had been West Germany was raised by his reports from his time in the US. The Hamburg-based national weekly newspaper offered him a contract, and he worked in the newspaper's Berlin office as its first – and for a long time only – East German contributing editor. Initially he signed off his contributions "Quoten-Ossi" (loosely "Quota Easterner"): he subsequently switched to the less ironical soubriquet, "Ostschreiber" (loosely, "Writer from the East").

By 2014 Dieckmann had published fifteen books. His thought-provoking newspaper pieces and books are wide-ranging, but he returns repeatedly to the subject of East Germany and the so-called "New states" ("neue Bundesländer") which replaced it. He describes how the country was and how it has changed since reunification, ranging over the places, the people and daily life. He has described his self-appointed project as one of translation and interpretation ("Übersetzungsarbeit"). That also includes explaining the westerners to the easterners. During the 1990s he received prestigious awards for insightful pieces, always crafted from a domestic/native perspective. Reviewers were impressed. Among intellectuals from what had been East Germany, something approaching an informal Dieckmann fan-club emerged, though the wave of enthusiasm has receded during the early 21st century. He still contributes essays and reports about life in the old East Germany, but increasingly he has been reinventing himself as a sport reporter, with a particular interest in football. FC Carl Zeiss Jena appears to be his favourite team.

== Published output (selection) ==
- 1990 Olle DDR.
- 1991 My Generation. Cocker, Dylan, Lindenberg und die verlorene Zeit.
- 1992 Oh! Great! Wonderful! - Anfänger in Amerika.
- 1993 Die Zeit stand still, die Lebensuhren liefen. Geschichten aus der deutschen Murkelei.
- 1994 Alles im Eimer, alles im Lot.
- 1995 Time is on my side. Ein deutsches Heimatbuch.
- 1998 Das wahre Leben im falschen. Geschichten von ostdeutscher Identität. (2002 as a radio drama)
- 1999 My Generation. Cocker, Dylan, Honecker und die bleibende Zeit.
- 2000 Hinter den sieben Bergen. Geschichten aus der deutschen Murkelei.
- 2001 Volk bleibt Volk. Deutsche Geschichten.
- 2002 Die Liebe in den Zeiten des Landfilms. Eigens erlebte Geschichten.
- 2004 Der Jena-Report.
- 2005 Rückwärts immer. Deutsches Erinnern.
- 2009 Mich wundert, daß ich fröhlich bin.
- 2012 Freiheit, die ich meine. Unbeherrschte Geschichten.
- 2013 Eine Liebe im Osten. Der Jena-Report und andere blaugoldweiße Fußballgeschichten.
- 2017 Mein Abendland. Geschichten deutscher Herkunft.
- 2021 How Did It Happen?: Understanding the Holocaust..

Most of the books by Christoph Dieckmann are published by Ch. Links Verlag, Berlin.

== Awards and recognition ==
- 1990: Stipendium from the World Press Institute in Saint Paul, Minnesota with a 6-month USA-exploration visit
- 1992: International Joseph Roth Prize in Klagenfurt, awarded for journalism that builds mutual understanding
- 1993: Theodor Wolff Prize for journalism
- 1994: Egon Erwin Kisch Prize, a literary prize awarded for journalism
- 1996: Friedrich Märker Prize for essayists
- 2017: Caroline-Schlegel Prize for essays and contributions to literary supplements and journals

== Personal ==
Christoph Dieckmann's first marriage fell apart at the time of reunification. By his first marriage he has a daughter, born in 1983. By his second marriage his son was born in 1995.
