= Münsingen, Germany =

Münsingen
- Town
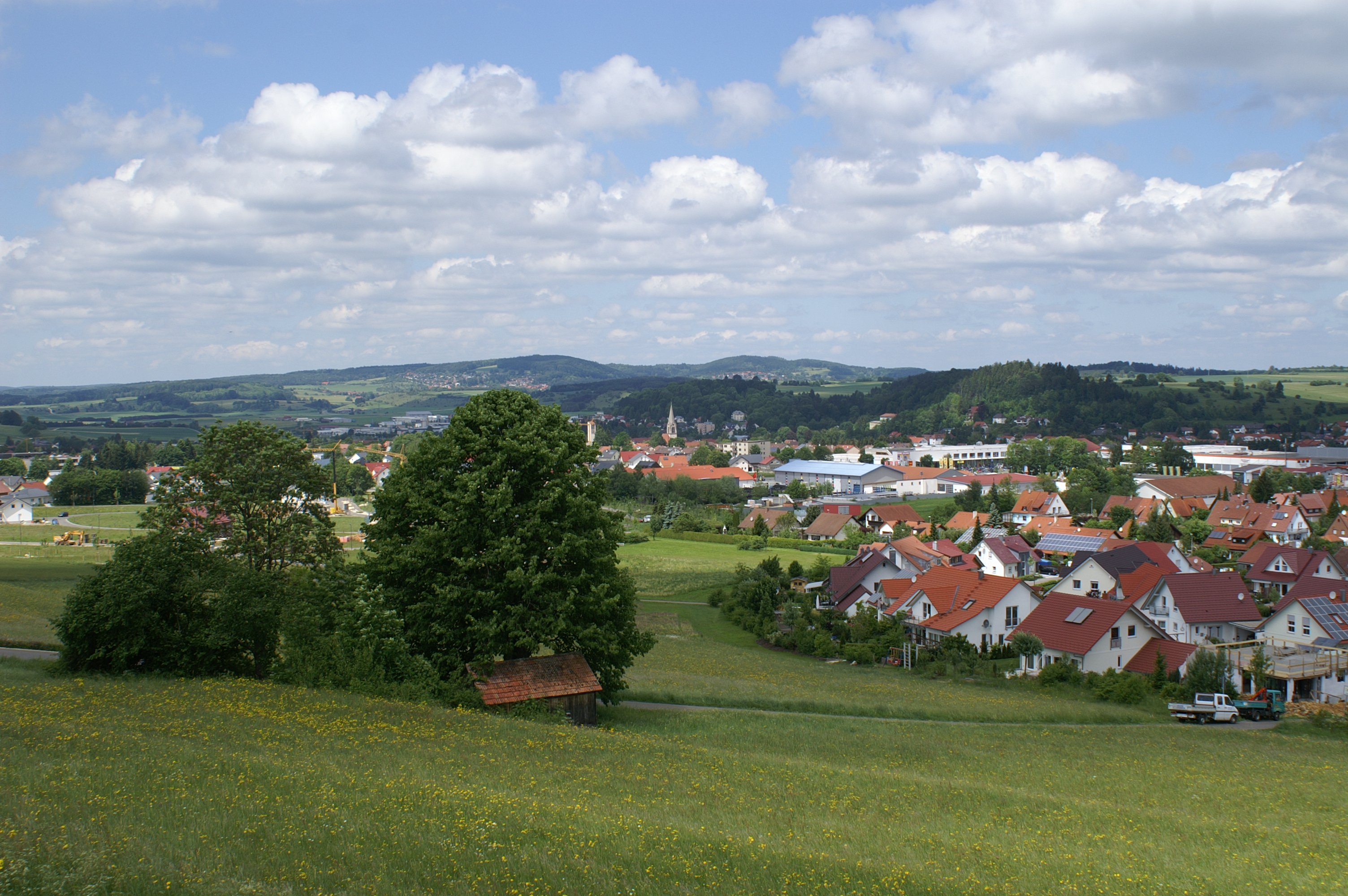
- Münsingen

- Coat of arms

- Location of Münsingen within Reutlingen district
- Interactive map of Münsingen
- Location within Germany Location within Baden-Württemberg
- Coordinates: 48°24′46″N 09°29′43″E
- Country: Germany
- State: Baden-Württemberg
- Admin. region: Tübingen
- District: Reutlingen
- Subdivisions: 14 Stadtteile

Government
  - Mayor (2021–29): Mike Münzing

Area
  - Total: 116.93 km^{2} (45.15 sq mi)
- Elevation: 707 m (2,320 ft)

Population (2025-12-31)
  - Total: 14,695
  - Density: 125.67/km^{2} (325.49/sq mi)
- Time zone: UTC+01:00 (CET)
  - Summer (DST): UTC+02:00 (CEST)
- Postal codes: 72525
- Dialling codes: 07381, 07383, 07384
- Vehicle registration: RT
- Website: www.muensingen.de

Münsingen (German pronunciation: [ˈmʏnzɪŋən]; Swabian: Mensenga) is a town in the district of Reutlingen, Baden-Württemberg, Germany. It is situated 23 km southeast of Reutlingen, and 37 km west of Ulm.

== History ==
The name Münsingen is probably derived from Alemannic chief called Munigis, who founded a settlement within the present-day city boundaries. In 775, Münsingen was mentioned for the first time on a deed of gift of Lorsch Abbey. The church of Münsingen was first mentioned in 804. The area was under the suzerainty of the Franks. Later, the village was under the suzerainty of county of Württemberg-Urach, who sold it to Ulrich I in 1263.

In 1339, Münsingen was granted Town privileges. After the partition of Württemberg, it came under the purview of Urach, until the re-unification of the County of Württemberg under the auspices of the Treaty of Münsingen in 1482. On October 23, 1654 Münsingen became an administrative center of regional importance. From 1938 to 1973 Münsingen was capital of the district of Münsingen.

In 1895, the German Empire began the construction of a proving ground which later became the Duke-Albrecht-Barracks. On March 31, 2004, the Duke-Albrecht-Barracks was shut down and the ground was converted into a settlement.

== Religions ==
The first mention of church building in Münsingen was in 804 AD. In 1537, the Reformation reached Münsingen and the surrounding villages of Apfelstetten, Auingen, Böttingen, Buttenhausen, Dottingen, Hundersingen, Rietheim and Trailfingen. The Lutheran Church Order was introduced to the Duchy of Württemberg in 1559.

The villages of Bichishausen, Gundelfingen and Bremelau, which are currently administered by Münsingen, used to be part of the Principality of Fürstenberg and Further Austria and due to this historical reason, the inhabitants are mainly Roman Catholic.

Due to the location of village of Magolsheim on the erstwhile border between Württemberg and Further Austria it has both Protestant and Catholic churches to cater to the spiritual needs of the villagers.

Münsingen used to be the seat of the Church District of Münsingen of the Evangelical-Lutheran Church in Württemberg until 1 December 2013 when the neighboring district of Bad Urach was amalgamated with the district of Münsingen to form the Church District Bad Urach-Münsingen.

The Apostolic Church, Baptists, United Methodist Church and the Biblical faith community are also present in Münsingen.

A large Jewish community used to exist in the village of Buttenhausen. The Jews of Buttenhausen were fully integrated into the communal life. This became apparent when during the November 1938 pogrom, the SA squad first had to arrest the mayor of Buttenhausen, who had stubbornly resisted the desecration of the synagogue. Only after his arrest, the SA were able to burn down the synagogue. The remaining Jewish families were deported in the following period and became victims of the Shoah. At the former site of the synagogue, a memorial stone is present. Additionally, in 1961 a memorial was erected in the centre of Buttenhausen with the names of 45 murdered Jewish inhabitants. The Jewish cemetery, Buttenhausen, which was in use from 1787 to 1943, also received a memorial stone.

Münsingen has a mosque which caters to the Turkish-Islamic community. The congregation consists of approximately 70 members as of 2015.

== Incorporations ==
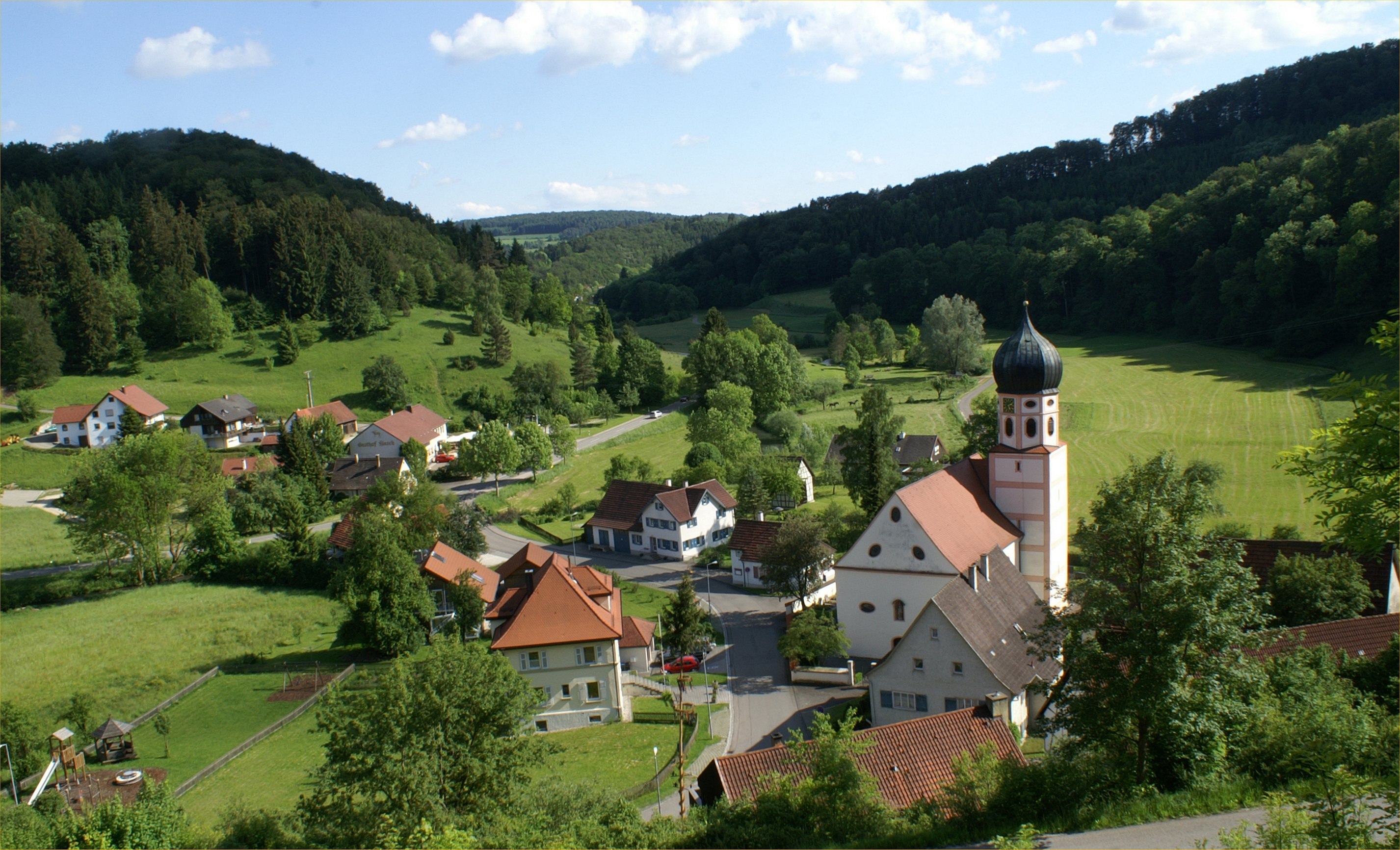
Bichishausen im Großen Lautertal

Bichishausen Lauter valley

Dürrenstetten was in 1822 united with Gundelfingen. As part of the municipal reform in Baden-Württemberg the following previously independent municipalities were amalgamated with Münsingen:

- July 1, 1971: Auingen, Böttingen and Dottingen
- January 1, 1974: Apfelstetten and Gundelfingen
- April 1, 1974: Bremelau and Trailfingen
- January 1, 1975: Bichishausen, Buttenhausen, Hundersingen, Magolsheim and Rietheim

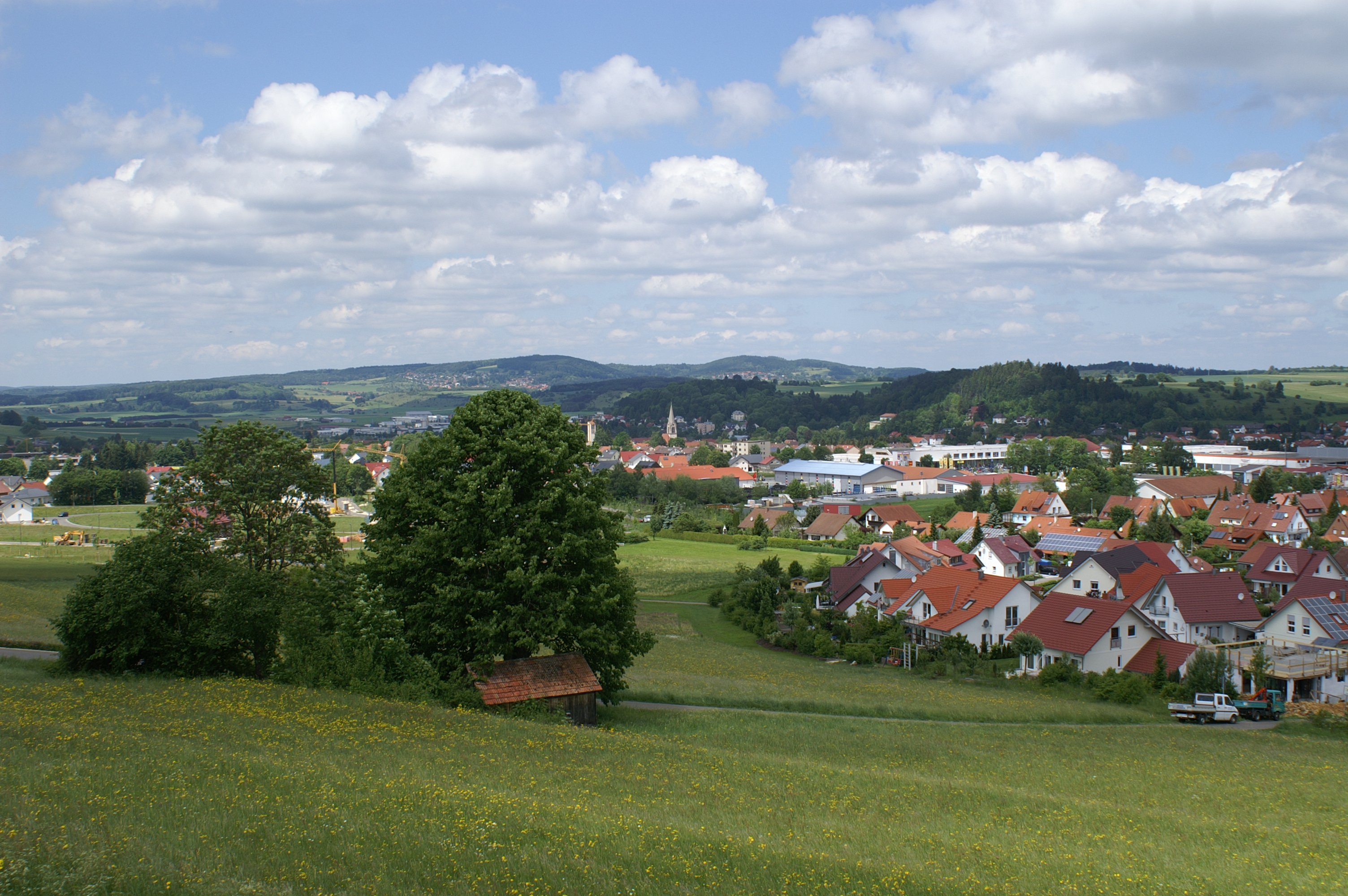
Münsingen (Württemberg)

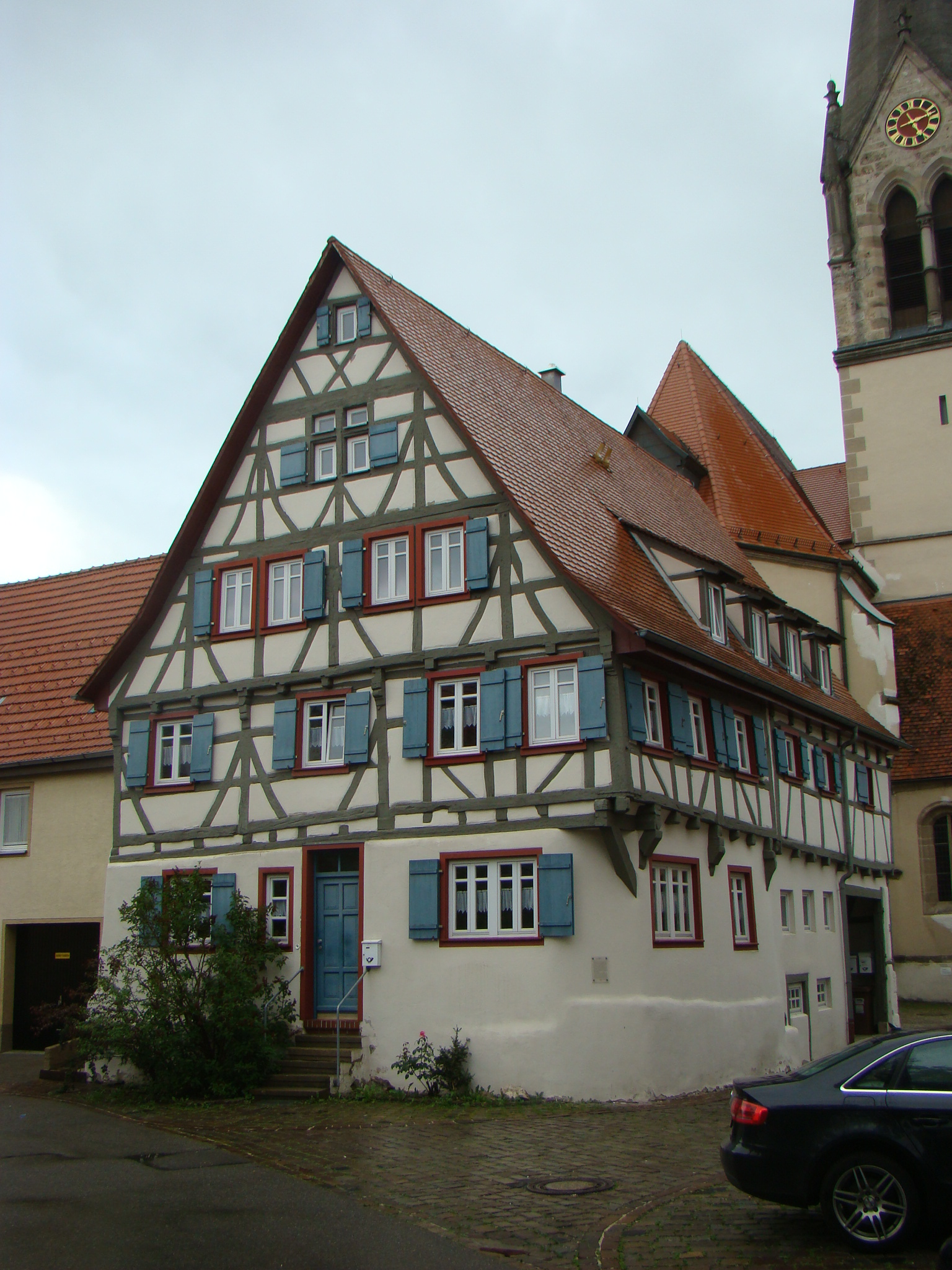
Half-timber house

== Politics ==
=== Council ===
The council in Münsingen has after the last election 26 members (2014: 24). The local elections in Baden-Württemberg 2019 on May 26, 2019 resulted in the following official results. The turnout was 57,5% (2014: 50,2%). The council consists of the elected honorary councilors and the mayor as chairman. The mayor is entitled to vote in the municipal council.

SPD	32,6%	+ 1,9 %	8 seats	+ 1
Free Voters Baden-Württemberg	28,5 %	+ 5,2 %	7 seats	+ 1
Free Democratic Party (FDP)/Liberal Citizens	25,4 %	+ 6,3 %	7 seats	+ 1
Alliance 90/The Greens	13,6 %	+ 8,2 %	4 seat	+ 4

=== Mayor ===
The Mayor is elected for a term of eight years. The term of office of Mike Muenzing ends on 27 November 2021.

- Around 1510: Jakob Ilsenbrand
- Ludwig Neuffer (his daughter Margaretha married Hans Hawysen)
- 1587: Hans Hawysen
- - N.N. -(we do not know)
- 1900-1922: August Wörner
- 1922-1945: Otto Werner
- 1945-1949: Eugen Hahn
- 1949-1971: Erwin Volz
- 1971-1981: Heinz Kälberer
- 1981-1997: Rolf Keller
- since 1997: Mike Münzing SPD

== Arms ==
The blazon coat of arms reads: "In silver a reclining four-ended black deer rod."

== Twinning ==
Münsingen is twinned with the following cities:

Beaupréau-en-Mauges in France	Mezőberény in Hungary

and maintains friendly relations with:

- Münsingen BE in Switzerland

== Tourism ==
Münsingen is located on the Swabian Poet Route, which passes by many sights.

=== Music ===
The musical culture Münsingen is mainly borne by the local music clubs. With the trombone choirs in Münsingen, Auingen, Hundersingen-Buttenhausen and Dottingen, the Stadtkapelle Münsingen and the music clubs Böttingen, Magolsheim and Rietheim many clubs are active in the field of Brass Band. There are also several church choirs, as well as the secular singer Communities "Liederkranz Münsingen" Männergesangsverein Apfelstetten, Sängerbund Buttenhausen, Liederkranz Dottingen, Liedertafel Hundersingen, men's glee club Trailfingen and the chorus of EJW district Münsingen.

=== Buildings ===
Featured buildings in Münsingen are the historic Old Town Hall from 1550, and its successor, the New Town Hall in timbered house style, which was built in 1935–1937. The "old stock" as a historical site with more than 140 buildings for up to 5200 soldiers. Also worth seeing are the market fountain and the Martin Church, completed in 1495 by Peter of Koblenz.

In Buttenhausen district Castle Buttenhausen and also a Jewish Cemetery. In addition, several ruins exist in Lautertal, for example the Castle Hohenhundersingen.

=== Towers ===
In the peripheral area of the former military training area Münsingen are four Towers of Swabian Albverein (Swabian Alp Association), which are all freely accessible (key deposit).

- The 42 m high 'Hursch Tower' 'is about 1.5 km southwest of Römerstein-Zainingen and was erected in 1981.
- The 20 m high 'Waldgreutturm' 'is 2 km southeast of Römerstein-Zainingen and was erected in 1981.
- The 30 m high 'Heroldstatt Tower' 'is about 2 km north-west of Heroldstatt - Ennabeuren and was erected in 1981.
- The 8 m high 'Sternberg Tower' 'is not far northeast of the Münsinger district Böttingen and was erected in 1900 originally as a windmill .

== Museums ==
Münsingen museums are the memorial site Matthias Erzberger in Buttenhausen, the Jewish Museum Buttenhausen, the local history museum in the Old Palace , the museum for former military training area in the "old camp" at Auingen. The museum Anton Geiselhart and the castle museum are located in Gundelfingen.

== Regular events ==
- On 1 May, regularly organized by Luftsportverein Münsingen, the international vintage and steam engines meeting takes place. Every year there are about 600 motorcycles, Lanz Bulldogs, steam engines, vintage aircraft and more.
- Every summer takes place in the streets of the old town instead of the city festival, which - with musical entertainment - especially thrives on the commitment of numerous Münsingen clubs.

== Economy and infrastructure ==
=== Established Businesses ===
The Uralan polymer processing is located in the industrial area West. In addition, the Walter AG and Volksbank Münsingen have a seat here.

=== Traffic ===
The Bundesstraße B 465 coming from Bad Urach comes through the town and runs to Ehingen and Biberach an der Riss. The national road 230 runs through the urban area in east–west direction and connects the region to the Federal Highway 8 in Merklingen. The Public transport is guaranteed by the Verkehrsverbund Neckar-Alb-Donau (NALDO). The community is located in the comb 225. The Münsingen station, is located on the Reutlingen–Schelklingen railway. On Sundays and holidays from early April to late October regional trains and special trains bring mainly hikers and sightseers to their destination. In addition, throughout the year goes from Monday to Friday, some regional trains direction Ulm or direction Gomadingen. Since early 2008 Münsingen is connected with a transition tariff also to the Donau-Iller-Nahverkehrsverbund (DING).

=== Media ===
The daily Alb-Bote , which is part of the Südwest Presse in Ulm reports daily on what is happening in and around Münsingen. Also, the Reutlinger General Anzeiger is represented in Münsingen.

=== Court ===
Münsingen has a District Court, which belongs to the District Court Tübingen and Higher Regional Court Stuttgart.

With the gymnasium Münsingen, the Gustav Mesmer - Realschule, the high school with Werkrealschule Schillerschule , the primary school primary school at Hardt in the district Auingen, primary school Dottingen, primary school Lautertalschule and the primary school Astrid Lindgren school all general education forms are represented in the town.

Besides, there are the Gustav-Heinemann-School (special school), the Erich Kaestner school, (Sprachheilschule), the Karl-Georg-Haldenwang -School for the mentally handicapped and the branch office of the physically disabled school Mössingen also four special schools.

The range is supplemented by the Vocational School Münsingen.

For the youngest inhabitants there are seven municipal, five Protestant and Roman Catholic kindergarten and two small nurseries.

== Sons and daughters of the town ==
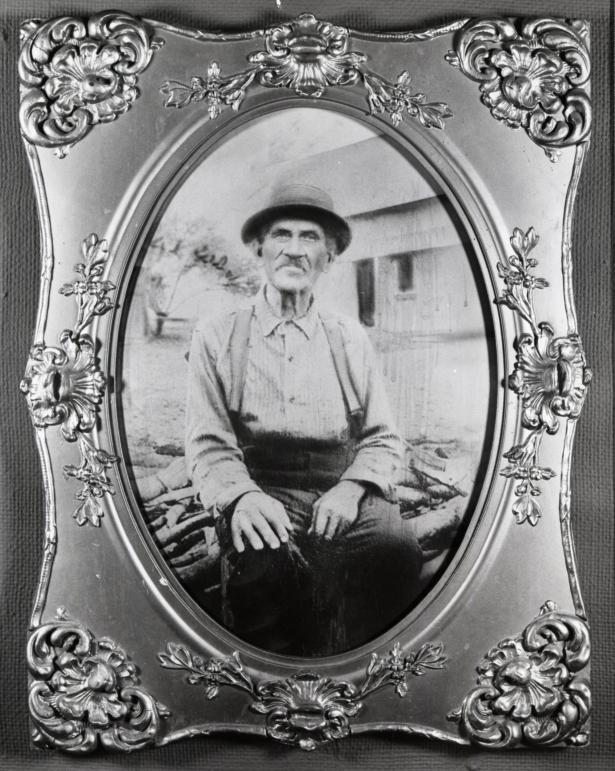
John Scholl, ca. 1900

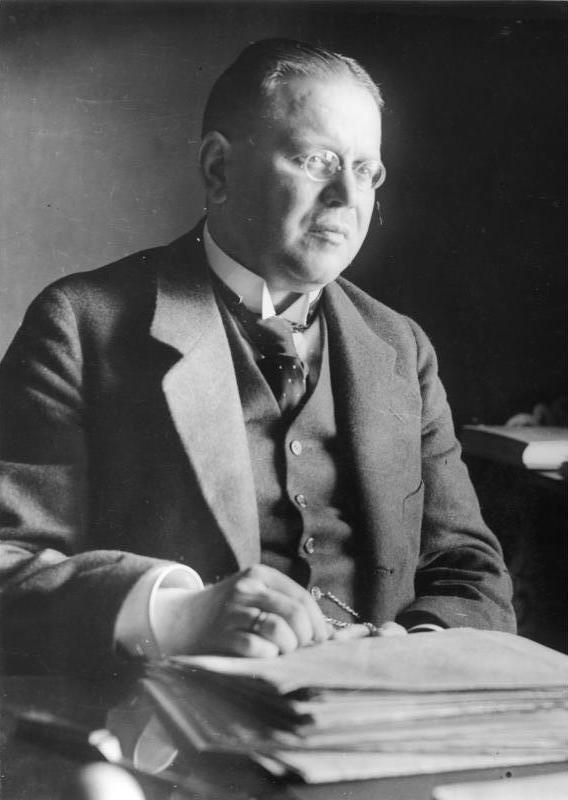
Matthias Erzberger, 1919

- Jacob Lorhard (1561–1609) a German philosopher and pedagogue based in St. Gallen, Switzerland
- Johannes Scholl (1827–1916) a German-American woodcarver, known for only using a jackknife and paint
- Lehmann Bernheimer (1841-1918) a German antique dealer, who built the Bernheimer-Haus in Munich.
- Theodor Ehemann (1869-1943) Württembergian official
- Matthias Erzberger (1875-1921) a German publicist and politician, Reich Minister of Finance 1919-1920
- Theodor Rothschild (1876 or 1879 - 1944 in Theresienstadt), educational reformer and victim of the Holocaust
- Erwin Nestle (1883-1972) a German scholar, theologian and philologist
- Max Kommerell (1902-1944), literary scholar and poet
- Johannes Hölz (1906–1945) a highly decorated Generalmajor in the Wehrmacht during World War II
- Rul Bückle (1925-2005), aviation pioneer, fighter pilot and founder of Südflug International
- Friedrich Mildenberger (1929-2012), Evangelical Lutheran theologian and professor of theology
- Heinz Seiffert (born 1952), politician, district chief executive of Alb-Donau-Kreis 2005-2016
- Gabriele Rauscher (born 1970) a German freestyle skier
- Andreas Glück (born 1975) politician and surgeon
- Dirk Schrade, (born 1978), eventer, gold medallist at the 2012 Summer Olympics

== International relations ==
Münsingen, Germany is twinned with:

Beaupréau, France	Mezőberény, Hungary	Münsingen, Switzerland

== See also ==
- Jewish cemetery, Buttenhausen
- Munzingen culture a neolithic culture which grew in the area from around 4000 to 3500 BC
