= Jewish cemetery, Buttenhausen =

Cemetery in Münsingen, Germany

Coordinates: 48.35872°N 9.47587°E

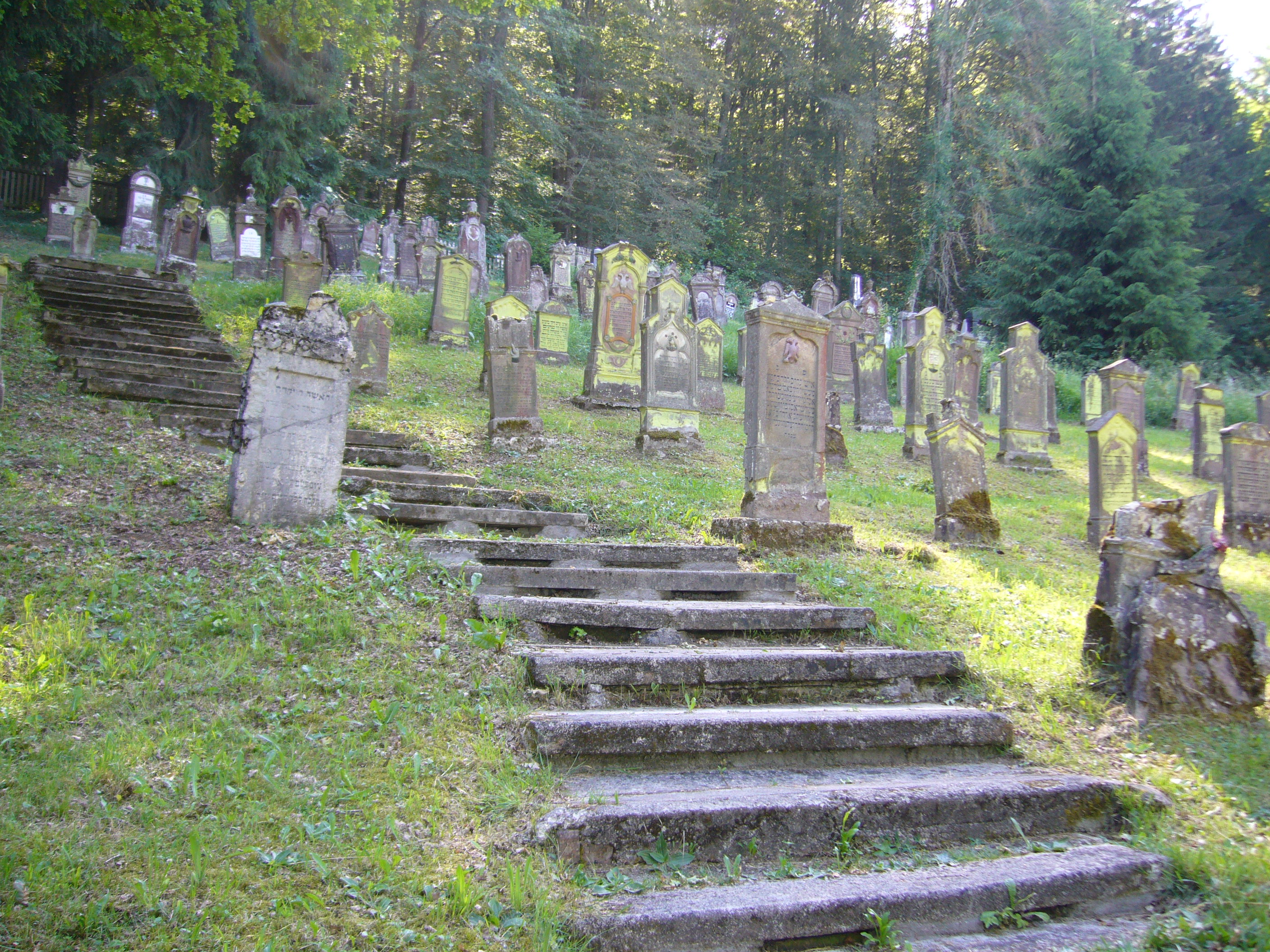
The Jewish Cemetery at Buttenhausen

The Jewish cemetery of Buttenhausen is a protected heritage site above the village of Buttenhausen, which forms part of the municipality of Münsingen, Germany in the district of Reutlingen, Baden-Württemberg, some 37 km west of Ulm. The cemetery is situated on a hillside on the south-western edge of the village.

== History ==
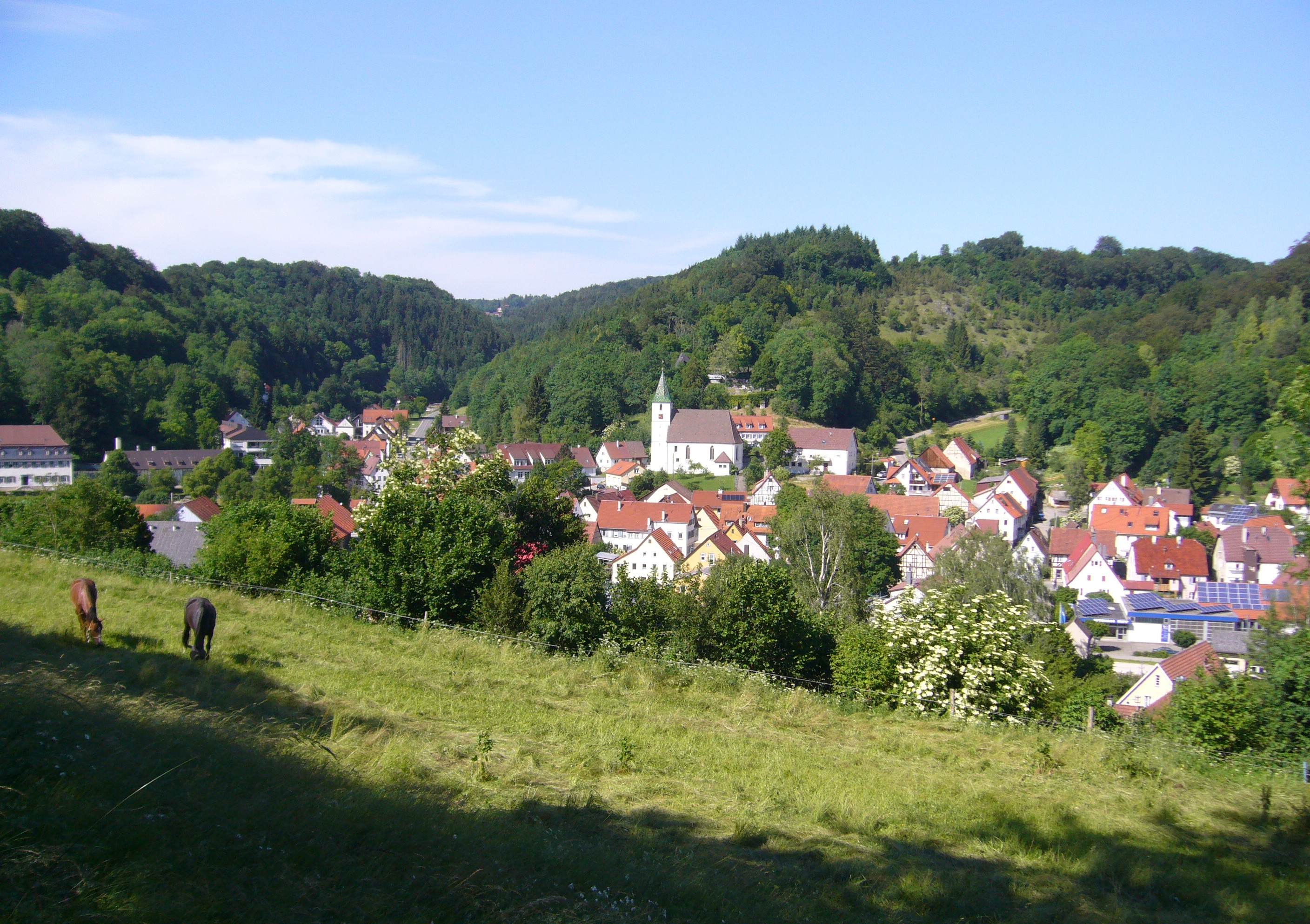
Buttenhausen, viewed from the path to the cemetery

The Jewish community at Buttenhausen was established by Baron Phillip Friedrich von Liebenstein by a charter of 7 July 1797. Motivated by the desire to stimulate economic activity in the village, he invited twenty-five Jewish families to settle there under his protection. One of the privileges granted to the new community was the right to establish a cemetery above the new Jewish quarter. By 1870, Buttenhausen's Jewish residents numbered 442 in a total population of 800 and lived in 46 of the village's 100 houses. The oldest legible inscription in the cemetery dates from 1802; the last burials took place in 1943, shortly before the final deportations of Jews from the village. Today, 399 gravestones survive from the period of the cemetery's use.

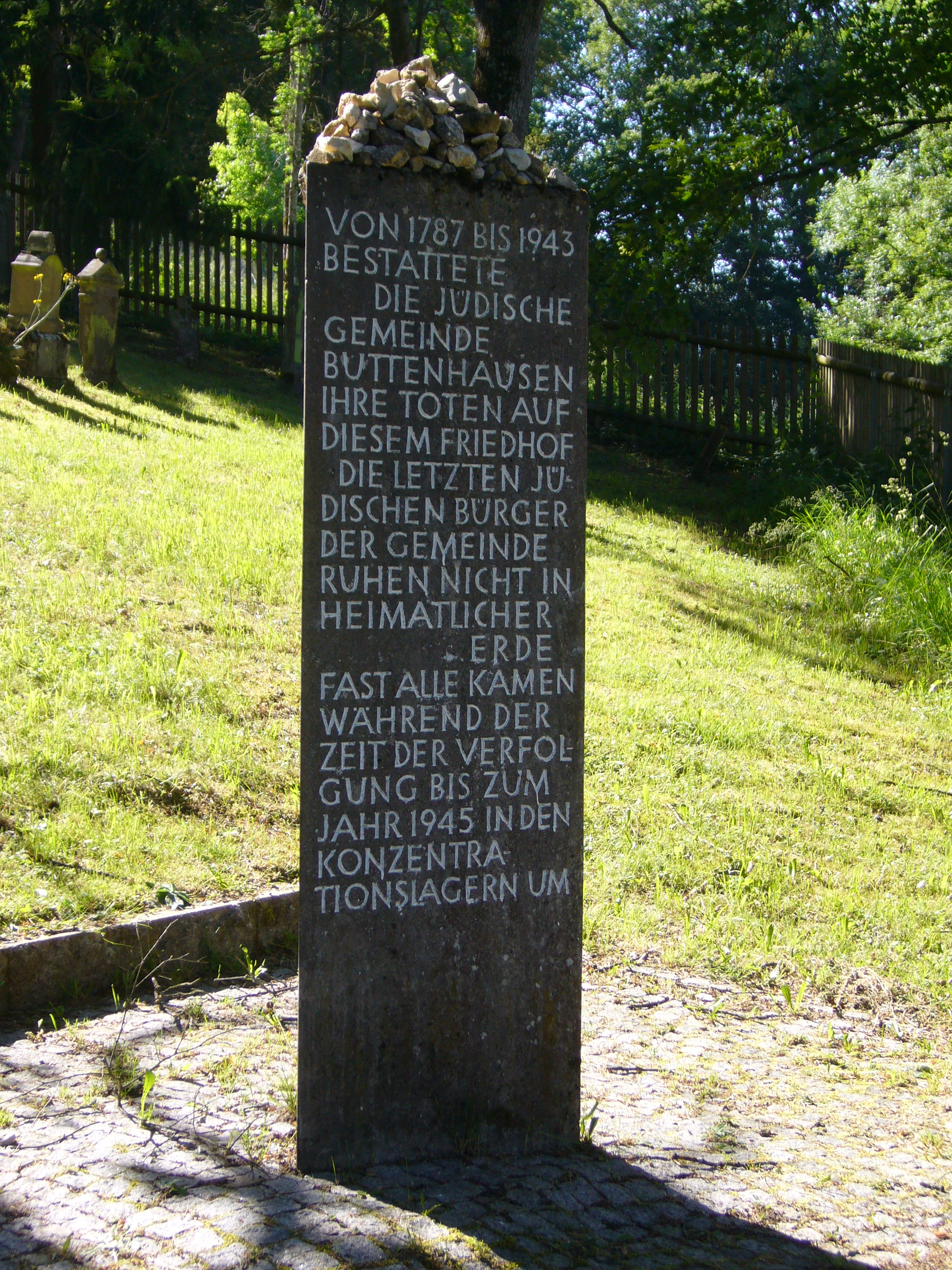
Memorial stone at the Jewish Cemetery. Double-click the image for a translation of the inscription.

A memorial stone near the entrance to the cemetery commemorates the now vanished Jewish community of Buttenhausen. Between 1940 and 1943 elderly Jews from the whole of the German Reich were forcibly sent to the so-called Jüdisches Altersheim ("Jewish Retirement Home"), namely the vacated quarters of Buttenhausen's Jews. From there, they were despatched to death camps. They are commemorated by a sculpture in the cemetery made from sections of railway track by the Swabian poet and singer-songwriter Thomas Felder.

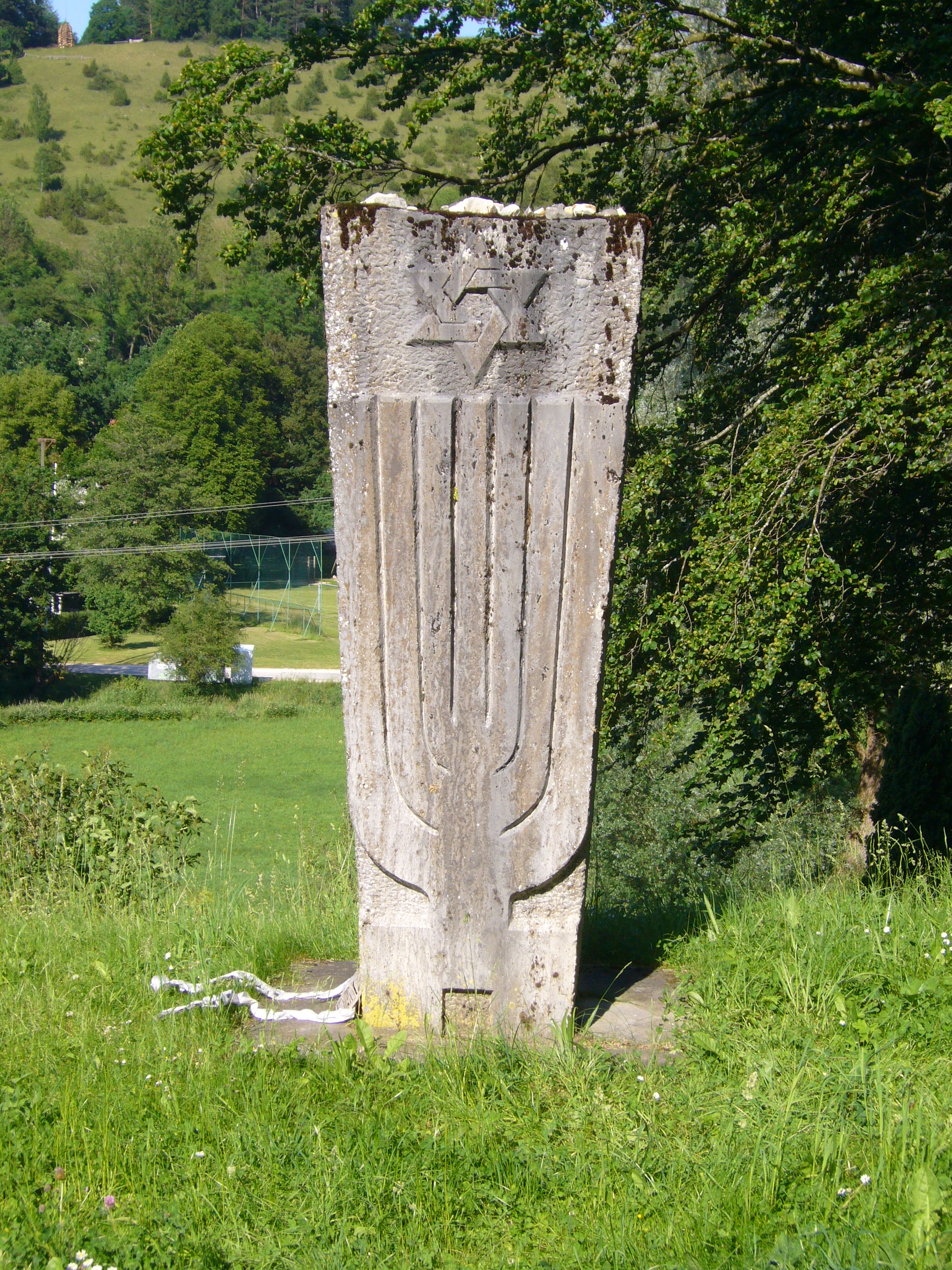
Memorial erected in 1966 on the site of the Buttenhausen synagogue, which was burnt down on the night of 9–10 November 1938 in the Kristallnacht. It stands next to the path leading to the cemetery

The cemetery shows clearly the development of various gravestone forms and inscription styles from the end of the 18th century to the middle of the 20th century. Whereas the oldest stones are simply decorated with Hebrew inscriptions, later ones are more impressively ornate and often indicate the geographical origin of the deceased. Since Jews were prevented from obtaining gravestones in the Nazi period, wooden stelae were erected on their graves (examples of which are now displayed in the town hall). They were replaced by simple gravestones n the 1960s.

== Preservation ==
The cemetery's remarkable state of preservation is largely the result of the efforts of Walter Ott. Born in Ulm in 1928, Ott became a resident of Buttenhausen after the Second World War where he worked on an agricultural estate. After coming across the abandoned cemetery in the course of chopping wood in 1946 he resolved to maintain the cemetery in good condition. In this, he was supported by former Jewish residents of Buttenhausen domiciled in the United States with whom he made contact after meeting Harry Lindauer (see external link) when the latter revisited his birthplace around 1960. In the 1970s Ott also discovered by chance a local archive of materials on the village's former Jewish inhabitants which enabled their history to be traced and encouraged further studies. In 1985 he was awarded the Federal Republic of Germany's highest civilian honour, the Bundesverdienstkreuz, in recognition of his efforts. In 2010, Ott received an Obermayer German Jewish History Award.

== See also ==
- History of the Jews in Germany
- Kristallnacht
