= Rudi Spring =

German composer, pianist and academic (1962–2025)

- Spring circa 2012
- Born: 17 March 1962; Lindau, Bavaria, West Germany
- Died: 28 December 2025 (aged 63)
- Education: Musikhochschule München (with Wilhelm Killmayer and Heinz Winbeck)
- Occupations: Composer; Pianist; Academic teacher
- Organizations: Musikhochschule München
- Awards: Villa Massimo

Rudi Spring (17 March 1962 – 28 December 2025) was a German composer of classical music, pianist and academic teacher. He also worked as a church organist and conductor. He was known for vocal compositions on texts by poets and his own, and for chamber music such as his three Chamber Symphonies. As a pianist, he played with several regular duo partners and made recordings of works by Bach and his sons, Schubert and Sibelius. He taught Lied interpretation at the Musikhochschule München from 1999.

== Life and career ==
Born in Lindau on 17 March 1962, Spring received piano instructions from Alfred Kuppelmayer, starting in 1971. He studied chamber music in 1978 in Bregenz with the cellist Heinrich Schiff, with whom he also played in concert and who encouraged him to compose. He worked from 1975 to 1986 as a church organist, and as a conductor from 1985. Spring studied at the Musikhochschule München from 1981 to 1986, composition with Wilhelm Killmayer and Heinz Winbeck, and piano with Karl-Hermann Mrongovius.

=== Composer ===
Spring composed songs and song cycles, inspired by poems of Heinrich Heine and Hermann Lenz. His song cycle in four volumes Galgenliederbuch sets poems from Christian Morgenstern's collection. He wrote a song cycles Nero lässt grüßen after Martin Walser's monodram, So nah in der Ferne, setting poems by Wolfgang Bächler), and a sequence of songs, Liederfolge für mittlere Singstimme und Klavier after poems by August Stramm, Else Lasker-Schüler, Ingeborg Bachmann and Jakob van Hoddis. Several of these works were recorded by Bayerischer Rundfunk, with singers such as Martina Koppelstetter.

He received commissions from the state of Baden-Württemberg, the Deutscher Musikrat (a member of the International Music Council), Münchener Kammerorchester, the Munich Puppet Players, the International Bodensee Festival the Hugo-Wolf-Akademie Stuttgart, the Arp Museum Rolandseck, Klavier-Festival Ruhr, and A*Devantgarde in Munich. Konstantin Wecker commissioned him to orchestrate his film score for In der Mitte eines Lebens.

In 2005, Spring was awarded the fellowship of the Villa Massimo in Rome.

=== Pianist ===
Spring played in duo collaborating with the violinist Erich Höbarth from 1984 to 2005, with the hackbrett player Marianne Kirch from 1989 to 1997, with the violist Hariolf Schlichtig from 1990 to 1996, with the accordionist Maria Reiter from 1994, with the vocalist Salome Kammer from 2000, and with the cellist Jessica Kuhn from 2005. In 2009, he accompanied Kammer at a recital of the Rheingau Musik Festival in songs and Chansons of the 1920s to 1940s. He played the piano in a trio concert at the Gasteig, with Jens Josef (flute) and Graham Waterhouse (cello), performing Martinů's trio and the premiere of the flute version of Gestural Variations; every composer contributed a Christmas carol, with Spring setting "Maria durch ein Dornwald ging".

==== Recordings ====
In 2008, two of his songs appeared on a CD of Salome Kammer, together with music of Cole Porter, Luciano Berio's Sequenza III, and Alban Berg, among others. He recorded keyboard works by Bach and his sons C. P.. E. Bach and W. F. Bach, released in 2000. He recorded piano Sonatas by Schubert in 2003 and 2004, and piano works by Jean Sibelius in 2009.

=== Teaching ===
Spring taught at the Musikhochschule from 1987, first vocal coaching, then ear training, musical analysis and pitch space, and from 1999 Lied interpretation. He was also chamber music teacher, head of a listening seminar and conductor. Spring wrote an extensive annual essay series "Im Bann der runden Zahlen" for the vocal pedagogy journal Vox humana.

=== Personal life ===
Spring was married; the couple had two sons. They lived in Munich.

Spring died unexpectedly on 28 December 2025, at the age of 63, after a heart attack.

== Awards ==
- 1987: Feldkircher Kulturpreis
- 1988: Bayerischer Staatlicher Förderpreis für junge Künstler
- 2002: Internationaler Bodenseekulturpreis
- 2005: Villa Massimo
- 2012: Kulturpreis of Lindau

== Works ==
Spring's compositions, published mostly by Verlag 433, include:

=== Stage ===
- Er trieb einen kleinen Finsternishandel op. 71 (1999), for speaker, Klangfiguren (half puppet, half instrument), accordion and violoncello, libretto on aphorisms of Georg Christoph Lichtenberg, premiere 10 June 1999 in Schloss Seefeld, Munich Puppet Players, Maria Reiter, Heinrich Klug
- Zwischen Blick hinter Grund, Op. 74e,1 (2000), text: Spring, premiere 1 April 2001 in Saulgau, Salome Kammer, Spring, recorded in 2002 by SFB Berlin
- An der steilen, roten Felswand, Op. 74e,2 (2002), text: Spring, premiere 2 May 2002 in Benediktbeuern, Salome Kammer, Spring (piano and speaking voice)
- Die Donau und ihr Geist, Op. 78 (2002), fairy tale melodram for speaker, pantomimes and sextet (clarinet, tenor hackbrett, accordion, celesta/piano, violin and double bass), libretto: Andrea Haupt and Elisabeth Verhoeven (after the book by Dorothea Rein), premiere 10 November 2002 in Stuttgart, Elisabeth Verhoeven, theatre group of the Musikschule Stuttgart, direction: Andrea Haupt

=== Vocal ===
For voice and one to six instruments

- Galgenliederbuch, Op. 19, (1983–2000) for voice and piano, after Galgenlieder (1895–1905) by Morgenstern
- Abend der Kindheit, Op. 20a (1983) for soprano and quintet (clarinet, horn, harp, violin and violoncello), text: Hermann Lenz, premiere 1983 at the Musikhochschule München
- So nah in der Ferne, Op. 52 (1984–91), song cycle for soprano (or mezzo-soprano) and trio: flute, viola and violoncello, texts: Wolfgang Bächler. premiere 13. November 1992 in Augsburg, Adelheid Maria Thanner, Bettina Fuchs, Gunter Pretzel, Anja Lechner, recorded in 1992 by BR
- Liederfolge, Op. 54 (1992/97) for voice and piano, premiere nos 1, 2, 3, 5, 7 in Weilburg, 27 July 1995, Dietrich Henschel, Fritz Schwinghammer, recorded in 1998 in Brussels, premiere nos 4 and 6 in Prien am Chiemsee, 25 October 1998, Martina Koppelstetter, Spring, recorded in 1999 by BR
- Ach sender schenke, Op. 55 (1992/93), prelude, song cycle and dance, for baritone and quintet (clarinet/bassett horn, percussion, tenor hackbrett, viola and cello, texts: Ulrich von Winterstetten, premiere 11 June 1993 in Schloss Achberg, Anselm Richter, Wolfgang Meyer, Stefan Hüge, Marianne Kirch, Hariolf Schlichtig, Manuel Fischer-Dieskau
- Incontro, Op. 79 (2003), canzone in dialogue for baritone and piano (or Hammerflügel). text: Francesco Petrarca, premiere 30 May 2004 in Biedenkopf, Eckelshausener Musiktage, Martin Bruns, Jan Philip Schulze

For voice and ensemble/orchestra

- Entzündet, Op. 70e (2001) for chanson baritone, accordion and string orchestra, text: Konstantin Wecker, premiere 24 June 2001 in Munich, Gasteig, Wecker, Maria Reiter, Abonnentenorchester of the Münchner Philharmoniker, conductor Heinrich Klug
- Heimkunft (Chamber Symphony No. 3), Op.74 (2000/01) for mezzo-soprano (or contralto), flute, clarinet, trumpet, accordion, harp and string orchestra, text: Friedrich Hölderlin, Heimkunft. An die Verwandten (1801–04), premiere 19 May 2001 in Tettnang, Neues Schloss, Christa Mayer

For voices a cappella

- Von guten Mächten wunderbar geborgen, Op. 45 (1983–1988) for five-part mixed choir, text: Bonhoeffer's "Von guten Mächten wunderbar geborgen" (19 December 1944), premiere 8 June 1991 in Minich, Studienchor of the Musikhochschule München, conductor Max Frey
- Narcissus und Echo, Op. 59 (1994), vocal scene for six-part mixed choir, texts from Ovid's Metamorphoses, premiere 6 August 1994 in Irsee Abbey, conductor Kurt Suttner

=== Instrumental ===
For one to four players

- Sonatine, Op. 1 (1979), for violoncello and piano, recorded 1980 by the (ORF in Linz, Heinrich Schiff, Spring
- Quartett, Op. 47 (1989), for two flutes, Naturton-hackbrett and piano
- Canto sopra un’ idea frattale (op. 81e; 2005) for bassoon and organ, premiere 28 April 2005 in Vienna, Radio-Kulturhaus of the ORF
- Risonanze, Op. 82b (2005), for flute, premiere 6 July 2005 in Rome, Villino of the Villa Massimo, Roberto Fabbriciani [born 1949])

For five to eight players

- Praeludien, Op. 37 (1986/87), for string sextet and Klavier, premiere 12 May 1992 in Schwaz, Wiener Streichsextett, Spring (piano)), recorded in 1992 by ORF in Innsbruck

For ensemble/orchestra

- Szene 1, Op. 10 (1981, revised 1987), for violoncello and orchestra, premiere 28 November 1981 in Prague, Heinrich Schiff, Prager Symphoniker, conductor Jiří Bělohlávek [born 1946]
- Chamber Symphony No. 1, Op. 63 (1995), for 12 brass players, premiere 6 June 1995 in Berlin
- Chamber Symphony No. 2, Op. 68 (1997), for clarinet/tenor saxophon, horn, percussion, accordion and string orchestra, premiere 12 February 1998 in the Herkulessaal of the Munich Residenz, Münchener Kammerorchester, conductor: Jobst Liebrecht

== Literature ==
- Oberdorfer, Bernd; Sprau, Kilian; Pilz, Wolfgang (2022). Rudi Spring – Komponist, Pianist, Pädagoge (in German). Munich: Allitera Verlag. ISBN 978-3-96233-326-3. OCLC 1378738463.
