= Johannes Hölz =

WW2 German Army general (1906-1945)

- Born: 2 July 1906; Münsingen, German Empire
- Died: 29 April 1945 (aged 38) near the Elbe River, Germany
- Military career
- Allegiance: Nazi Germany
- Branch: Army
- Service years: 1936–1945
- Rank: Generalmajor
- Conflicts: World War II; Battle of France; Operation Barbarossa; Battle of Smolensk (1941); Battle of Moscow; Eastern Front; Battles of Rzhev; Battle of Kursk; Operation Bagration; Bobruysk Offensive; Belostock Offensive; Vistula–Oder Offensive; Battle of the Seelow Heights; Battle of Halbe
- Awards: Knight's Cross of the Iron Cross
- Other work: Police officer

Johannes Hölz (2 July 1906 – 29 April 1945) was a highly decorated Generalmajor in the Wehrmacht during World War II. He was also a recipient of the Knight's Cross of the Iron Cross. Johannes Hölz was killed on 29 April 1945 during the retreat of 9. Armee during the Battle of Halbe.

== Awards and decorations ==
- Iron Cross (1939)
  - 2nd Class
  - 1st Class
- Eastern Front Medal
- German Cross in Gold (5 May 1943)
- Knight's Cross of the Iron Cross on 10 October 1944 as Oberst i.G. and Chief of the General Staff of LV. Armeekorps

Military offices
Preceded by Generalmajor Helmut Staedke	Chief of Staff of the 9. Armee; 30 November 1944 – 29 April 1945	Succeeded by None
