= Friedrich-Märker-Preis =

German literary award

Friedrich-Märker-Preis was a Bavarian prize given to essayists. It was named after the essayist Friedrich Märker.

From 1986 to 2002, the award was given annually by the Münchner Stiftung zur Förderung des Schrifttums of Munich. The prize money was €4,000. In addition, the foundation awarded the silver pen "for outstanding contributions to the teaching and dissemination of literature."

== Winners of the Friedrich-Märker Preis ==
- 1989 Carl Amery
- 1990 Harald Weinrich
- 1991 Reinhold Baumgart
- 1992 Eva Hesse
- 1993 Karl Heinz Kramberg
- 1994 Wieland Schmied
- 1995 Rüdiger Safranski
- 1996 Christoph Dieckmann
- 1997 Hans Krieger
- 1999 Peter Sloterdijk
- 2000 Erwin Chargaff
- 2001 Peter von Matt
- 2002 Anita Albus
