= Munzingen culture =

Neolithic archaeological culture

- Period: Neolithic
- Dates: c. 4000–3500 BC

The Munzingen culture is a Neolithic archaeological culture of the Jungneolithikum (Late Neolithic) distributed across Alsace and the Upper Rhine region from around 4000 to 3500 BC, extending from the Sundgau in the south to the Kraichgau in the north. It was defined in 1968 by Jens Lüning on the basis of ceramics from the type site of Munzingen-Tuniberg, as a derivative of the Michelsberg culture. The Munzingen culture was succeeded by the late Pfyn culture and the early Horgen culture.

== Origins ==
The origins of the Munzingen style are debated. Some research suggests it developed as a regional group of the late Michelsberg culture, while others posit an independent origin in the Sundgau and southern Alsace, with links to the ceramics of the Central Midlands and the Lake Constance region. Defining the Munzingen style is difficult because most finds come from pit settlements and burials preserved in dry soils, where well-dated assemblages are rare.

== Ceramics ==
Despite the controversy over origins, research consistently highlights regional differences between the ceramics of the south (from the Sundgau to Colmar, on both banks of the Rhine) and those of northern Alsace (north of Colmar), as well as between the Kaiserstuhl region and the Kraichgau.

Assemblages with absolute dates allow the Munzingen ceramic style and its evolution to be described. Around 3950/3900 BC, both regions yield vessels with S-shaped profiles, flared rims, and flat bases, sometimes with slightly marked shoulders. Some vessels show lugs or rows of impressed decoration on the rim, as well as beaded rims and slip applications. Bowls are also present (some with segmented profiles), less frequently shallow dishes and Backplatten ("bread plates"). Tall conical forms for bowls and jars are found mainly in the north, suggesting regional differences from an early stage.

In the south, the ceramic tradition appears to have evolved continuously until around 3600/3500 BC. S-shaped profiles, marked shoulders, and lugs or impressed rim motifs persisted, while forms became somewhat more angular over time. In the north, elongated conical vessel profiles dominate from 3850/3800 BC onward, and slip applications increase. Lugs on vessel rims are rare, but rolled rims appear, as do shallow bowls and dishes with pronounced shoulders; "bread plates" with finger-impressed rim decoration are also characteristic.

Ceramics of the Munzingen culture may also have been found in what is now northern Switzerland, though the small number of finds prevents precise stylistic attribution. Isolated vessels displaying Munzingen stylistic elements have been identified at several lakeshore settlements of the Swiss Plateau, suggesting mobility and networks of contact with Alsace and the Upper Rhine valley.

== Bibliography ==
- Lüning, Jens: Die Michelsberger Kultur. Ihre Funde in zeitlicher und räumlicher Gliederung, 1968.
- Jeunesse, Christian: "La culture de Munzingen dans le cadre du 'Jungneolithikum' du sud-ouest de l'Europe centrale d'après les découvertes récentes des sites alsaciens de Didenheim (Haut-Rhin) et Geispolsheim (Bas-Rhin)", in: Cahiers de l'Association pour la promotion de la recherche archéologique en Alsace, 5, 1989, pp. 155–184.
- Jammet-Reynal, Loïc: "The Munzingen culture in the southern Upper Rhine Plain (3950–3600 BC)", in: Heitz, Caroline; Stapfer, Regine (ed.): Mobility and Pottery Production. Archaeological & Anthropological Perspectives, 2017, pp. 69–88.
- Lefranc, Philippe; Denaire, Anthony: "Le Munzingen: sur la genèse et le développement d'une culture archéologique du sud de la plaine du Rhin au 4e millénaire av. J.-C.", in: Revue archéologique de l'Est, 69, 2020, pp. 51–82.
