= Otto Mainzer =

German-American writer

- Born: 26 November 1903; Frankfurt am Main, Hesse, Germany
- Died: 28 June 1995 (aged 91); New York City, U.S.
- Occupation: Writer

Otto Mainzer (26 November 1903 in Frankfurt am Main – 28 June 1995 in New York City) was a German-American writer. He was unconventional, and wrote about issues such as free love.

Mainzer was the son of Bertha Loeb. He graduated in Law in 1928 and received his doctorate in law. He then worked as a lawyer at the Berlin Court of Appeal. When he removed in 1933 because of his Jewish origin, he emigrated to Paris. There he made the acquaintance of André Gide, Heinrich Mann, Arnold Zweig and Erwin Piscator, who supported him financially. At the time of his Paris exile, Mainzer became acquainted with the writings of psychoanalyst Wilhelm Reich. Under the influence of Reich's ideas about sex-economy, Mainzer produced some major works on sexual coercion. In 1941 Mainz continued his emigration, and went to the USA. There he met his girlfriend Ilse Wunsch and lived for 25 years, "unmarried, in two different apartments, but in an intimate love relationship" until they married. After his death in 1995 his wife established the Otto-Mainzer-Preis in New York for the science of love, worth 5,000 U.S. dollars. The last prize was awarded in 2015.

== Works ==
- Gleichheit vor dem Gesetz, Gerechtigkeit und Recht. Dissertation, Frankfurt 1929.

als Nachdruck: Keip Verlag, Goldbach 1996.

- Die sexuelle Zwangswirtschaft. Ein erotisches Manifest. (1937) Parabel-Verlag, München 1981, ISBN 3-7898-0962-4.
- Der zärtliche Vorstoß. In 66 Gedichten. Kirchheim Verlag, München 1986, ISBN 3-87410-017-0. (Nachdruck der Exil-Ausgabe Paris 1939)
- Prometheus (Roman, 1939) Stroemfeld / Roter Stern, Frankfurt am Main und Basel 1989, ISBN 3-87877-325-0.
- "Auf die höchsten Sterne will ich zielen." Stroemfeld / Roter Stern, Frankfurt am Main (noch nicht erschienen, angekündigt), ISBN 3-87877-828-7.

== Literature ==
- Ilse Wunsch-Mainzer: Zurück nach vorn. Mein Leben mit Prometheus. Stroemfeld / Roter Stern, Frankfurt am Main und Basel 1998, ISBN 3-87877-574-1.
- Michael Lukas Moeller: Auf dem Weg zu einer Wissenschaft von der Liebe – Dyadologie: die Lehre vom Dialog der Dyade. Rowohlt Verlag, Reinbek 2002, ISBN 3-499-61417-0.
