= Hargelsberg =

- Municipality
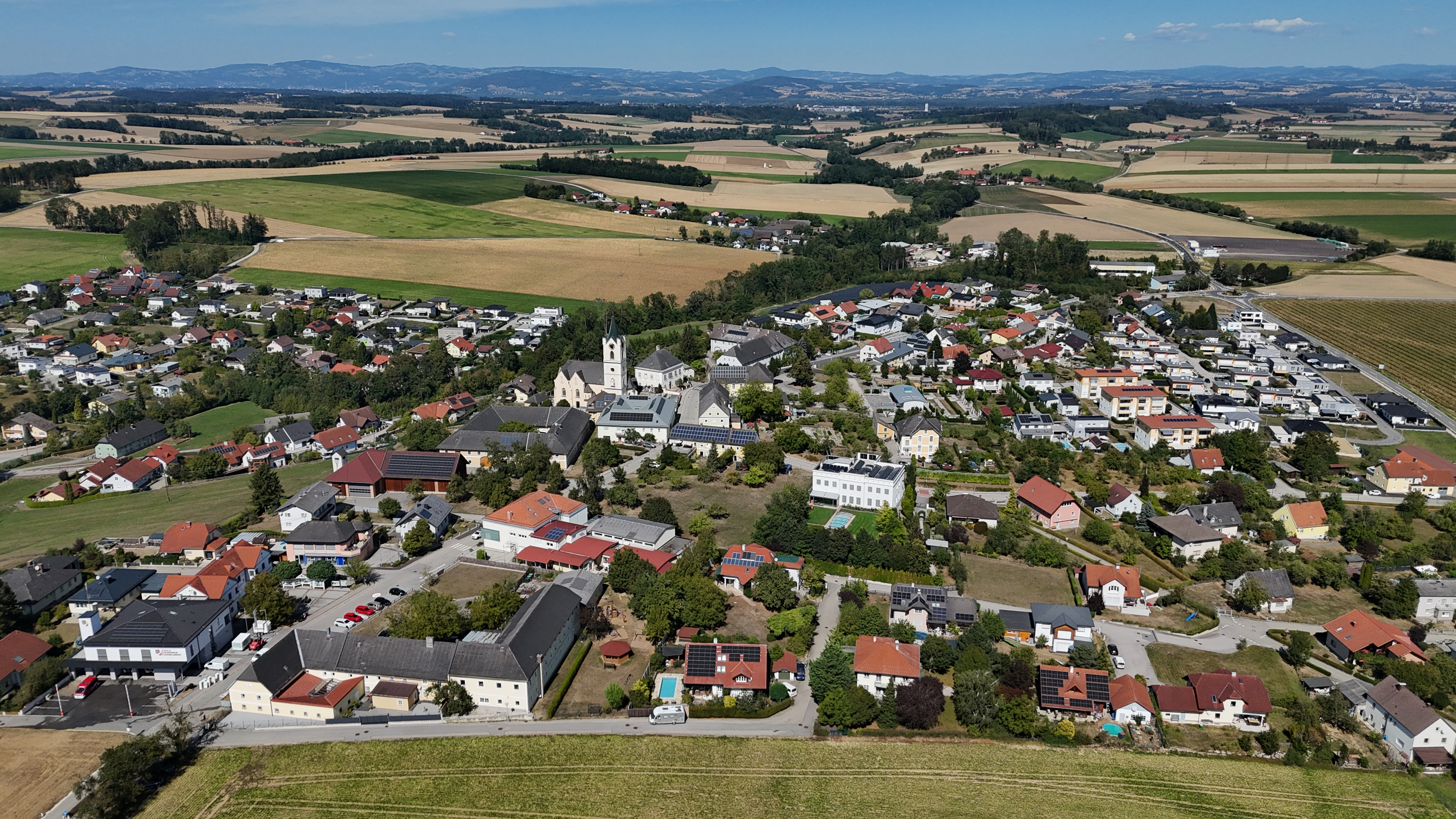
- Church of Saint Andrew

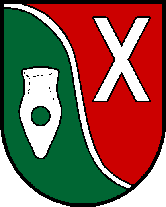
- Coat of arms

- Location within Austria
- Coordinates: 48°9′0″N 14°25′32″E
- Country: Austria
- State: Upper Austria
- District: Linz-Land

Government
  - Mayor: Manfred Huber (ÖVP)

Area
  - Total: 17.89 km^{2} (6.91 sq mi)
- Elevation: 324 m (1,063 ft)

Population (2018-01-01)
  - Total: 1,371
  - Density: 76.63/km^{2} (198.5/sq mi)
- Time zone: UTC+1 (CET)
  - Summer (DST): UTC+2 (CEST)
- Postal code: 4483
- Area code: 07255
- Vehicle registration: LL
- Website: www.hargelsberg.ooe.gv.at

Hargelsberg is a municipality in the district Linz-Land in the Austrian state of Upper Austria.

== Geography ==
Hargelsberg lies 324 meters above sea level. The municipality is about 4.5 kilometers from north to south, and about 6.3 km east to west. The total area is 17.8 km². Some 7.9% of the area is wooded, with 84.3% of the area devoted to agriculture.

=== Localities ===
Hargelsberg municipality contains the following named villages: Hargelsberg, Penking, Sieding, and Thann. Other localities are Angersberg, Firsching, Franzberg, Hart, Hausmanning, and Pirchhorn.

== History ==
The area surrounding Hargelsberg came under the dominion of the Bavarian Duchy in the seventh century, and the place is heard of in the twelfth century as part of the Austrian Duchy. From 1490 it was incorporated into the Archduchy 'Austria Above the Enns'. During Napoleonic Wars, the location saw French incursions. Since 1918, Hargelsberg has been part of Bundesland Upper Austria. Following the Anschluss with Germany on 13 March 1938, the locality was part of Gau Oberdonau" but in 1945 was restored to Bundesland Upper Austria.

Historical objects from Hargelsberg can be examined in the museum at Enns.

=== Notgeld ===
Like many municipalities of Upper Austria, Hargelsberg issued Notgeld for collectors in 1920. Hargelsberg was more prolific than most, with all of its villages and localities issuing special series (Sonderserien) in limited prints. Several hundred varieties exist.

== Population ==
Historical population

Year	Pop.	±%
1869	1,066	—
1880	1,163	+9.1%
1890	1,111	−4.5%
1900	1,038	−6.6%
1910	1,090	+5.0%
1923	1,056	−3.1%
1934	1,038	−1.7%
1939	1,009	−2.8%

Year	Pop.	±%
1951	1,063	+5.4%
1961	842	−20.8%
1971	755	−10.3%
1981	782	+3.6%
1991	847	+8.3%
2001	1,082	+27.7%
2011	1,231	+13.8%
