= Arthur S. Obermayer =

American chemist and entrepreneur

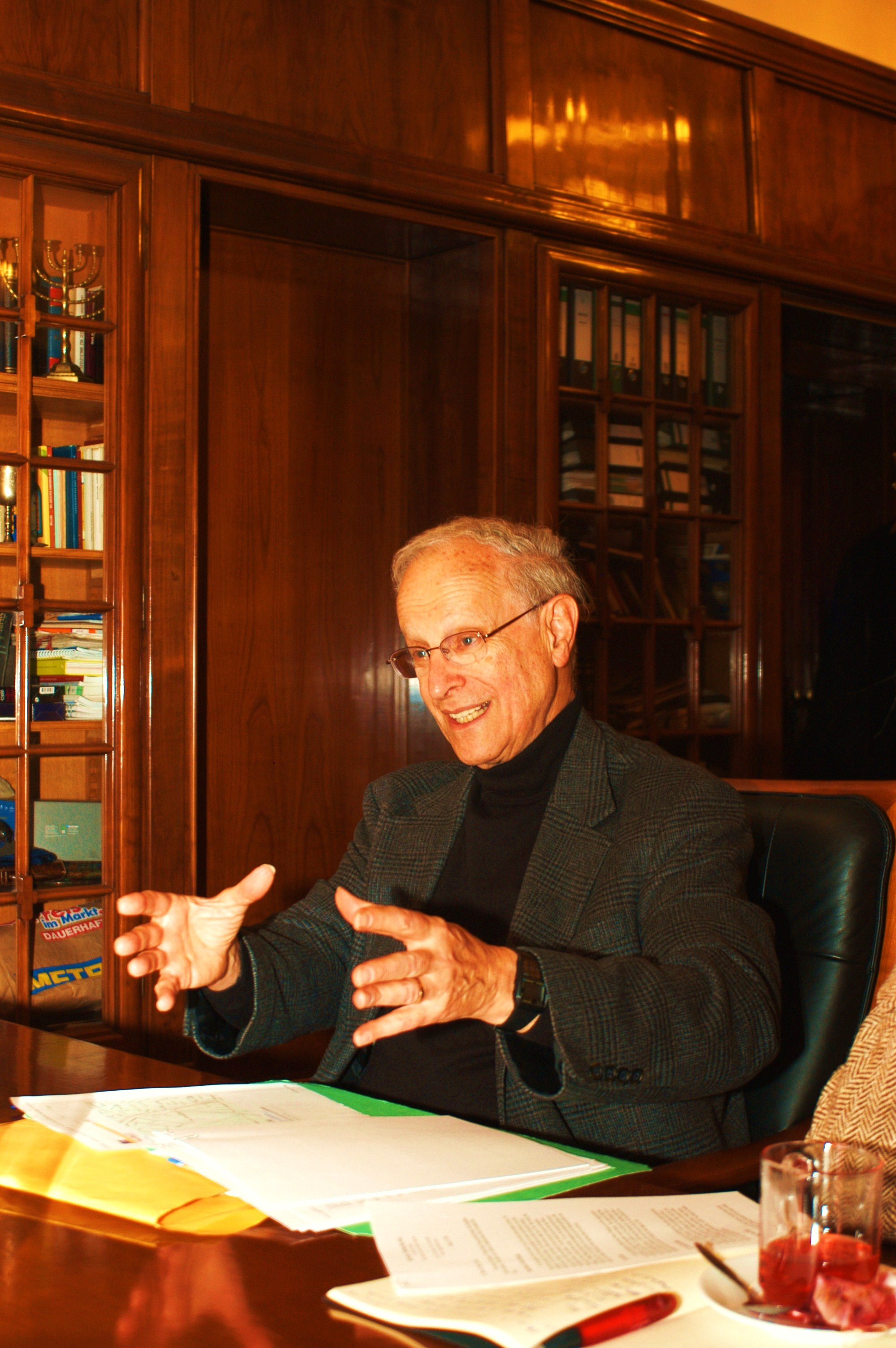
- Arthur S. Obermayer in 2009
- Born: July 17, 1931; Philadelphia, Pennsylvania, US
- Died: January 10, 2016 (aged 84); Dedham, Massachusetts, US
- Education: Swarthmore College (BS); Massachusetts Institute of Technology (PhD)
- Alma mater: )
- Occupations: Businessman, philanthropist
- Spouse: Judith Obermayer
- Children: 3

Arthur S. Obermayer (July 17, 1931 – January 10, 2016) was an American chemist, entrepreneur and philanthropist. After selling Moleculon Research Corporation in Cambridge, Mass., "which he founded in the 1960s, [he and his wife Judith] became influential philanthropists and activists for a variety of causes, from state politics, where the couple helped to elect the first Roman Catholic priest to the US House of Representatives, to entrepreneurship. The Obermayers were inducted into the Small Business Innovation Research Hall of Fame in 2015." (https://www.csmonitor.com/World/Making-a-difference/Change-Agent/2016/0127/Obermayer-Awards-overcome-silence-with-stories-of-German-Jewish-history). In 2000, he co-founded the Obermayer German Jewish History Awards, "see how they might call attention to non-Jewish Germans’ work, affirming their mission while demonstrating to Jews abroad just how much had changed.... co-sponsored by JewishGen, a nonprofit resource for Jewish genealogy; the Berlin state parliament; LBI; and the Obermayer Foundation." (Ibid).

== Early life ==
Arthur S. Obermayer was born in Philadelphia. His "four grandparents were all German." His family came from Creglingen.

Obermayer graduated from Swarthmore College. He received a PhD in chemistry from the Massachusetts Institute of Technology (MIT).

== Business career ==
Obermayer was an entrepreneur. He was the founder and president of the Moleculon Research Corporation, "a chemical, polymer and pharmaceutical research and development company." He was a co-founder of Zero Stage Capital. Meanwhile, he took Moleculon, Inc. public in 1981 and sold it to an Australian corporation in 1984.

Obermayer promoted government programs to help small business. In 1976, a bill authorizing the establishment of the SBIR program was passed by Congress. Arthur Obermayer had worked with Senator Kennedy since 1970, testifying often before Congress, urging passage of R&D funding for small business. The Small Business Innovative Research (SBIR) program was reauthorized in 1982 and that year, Obermayer's Company, Moleculon, received a SBIR grant for $25,000 from National Science Foundation (NSF). Arthur and Judith Obermayer promoted the Bayh-Dole Patent Act, which gives title for inventions that result from government-funded research to small businesses instead of their becoming the property of the government. This legislation encouraged more small businesses to apply for SBIR grants.

Arthur and Judith Obermayer were inducted into the Small Business Administration (SBA) Hall of Fame in 2015 for their contributions to the economy, during a White House ceremony, citing their role in securing the initial funding for the SBIR program. which reached a total funding of more than $50 billion by 2018. In his induction speech, Obermayer said, “Next to the G.I. Bill after WWII, the Small Business Innovation Program (SBIR) was one of the most significant pieces of legislation ever passed by Congress.” He noted that his involvement with ACS and the SBIR program were important components of his career path. With 3.2% of the Federal R&D budget in FY 2017, SBIR/STTR has created more than 22% of America's key innovations. He was an active member of the American Chemical Society (ACS) and the Northeastern Section of the American Chemical Society (NESACS).

== Philanthropy ==
Obermayer co-founded the Obermayer German Jewish History Awards with JewishGen and the Leo Baeck Institute in 2000. He said of the award recipients, "'It's more than curiosity...They're longing for their past:" a missing piece of Germany.'" As one reporter noted, "Sometimes, that curiosity gets them in trouble. A number of Obermayer awardees have faced threats, or simply bewildered loved ones. But over and over, recipients write that the recognition has helped them expand their work, aiding efforts to connect with similarly minded individuals and organizations dedicated to German Jewish history and relations. Many of them also support recent immigrants, hoping that the face-to-face approach their Jewish history celebrates can benefit German-Muslim relations, as well as Muslim-Jewish ones." As Obermayer also noted, "'It’s hard to persecute Muslim immigrants if you know who they are.'" He noted that he had "'zero doubt' that his parents wanted awardees' work for respect and tolerance to influence how Germans see their newest neighbors, too.'" (https://www.csmonitor.com/World/Making-a-difference/Change-Agent/2016/0127/Obermayer-Awards-overcome-silence-with-stories-of-German-Jewish-history) He was also recipient of the Cross of the Order of Merit of the Federal Republic of Germany in 2007.

== Personal life and death ==
Obermayer had a wife, Judith, and three children. He died of cancer on January 10, 2016, in Dedham, Massachusetts. He was the brother of Herman Obermayer.
