= Stefan Obermaier =

- Born: January 8, 1981; Salzburg, Austria
- Occupation(s): Electronic musician, producer, DJ

Stefan Obermaier (born 8 January 1981) is an Austrian electronic musician, producer and DJ. Born in Salzburg, Stefan Obermaier lives and works in Vienna since 2001. He produces different house music styles, downtempo and electronica.

== Life and music ==
His parents gave Stefan Obermaier his first electronic keyboard when he was just five years old. In the early 1990s, he already played in various funk and jazz projects. In 1997 and 1998, he won the Austrian Band Contest with his school band for his original compositions. Inspired by the "Vienna Sound" in the mid 1990s, Stefan made it at the age of 17 to the forefront of performing electronic musicians in the Salzburg area. During a time before the convenience of laptops he was one of the very few hauling around their computers and installing them in venues for gigs.

After finishing school, Obermaier moved to Vienna in 2001 to study music science, but left the University after four semesters upon signing his first record contract with Universal Music in order to focus on his music. The first original recordings under his own name got released through the Viennese music label "Vienna Scientists". He worked further on remixes for a.o. M, Mark Murphy, Supermax, Armada Music, !K7, Compost Records, Music For Dreams and many more.

At the same time, Obermaier started a series of reinterpretations from classical music repertoire. In 2008 Obermaier revealed his "Classic Reloaded" project, where he developed the fusion of his own electronica with the prestigious works of great classical composers, thereby creating a new musical concept starting with "Beethoven Reloaded" (2008) followed by "Mozart Reloaded" (2012). Obermaier received three golden and one platinum award for his "Classic Reloaded" project.

In 2012 Stefan Obermaier and his former partner Zwetelina Angelova founded their own label imprint "Drift Recordings", inaugurated by its first release, the "Bagana EP" and the single "Traveler", which reached the Top 10 of Germany's (DCC) and UK's (Cool Cuts) leading club charts.

== Discography ==
=== Releases ===
- 2022: Senses (feat. Paax Tulum) (Sirin)
- 2021: Keya (Trndmsk)
- 2020: Sierra/Delta (Drift Recordings)
- 2020: Na Nah (Madorasindahouse)
- 2020: Odori (Drift Recordings)
- 2019: Atha/Saree (Drift Recordings)
- 2019: Jago (Natura Viva)
- 2019: The Exchange (Collaboration Album with Richard Dorfmeister a.o. (Dr. Rich Recordings)
- 2018: This Vibe (Album) (Universal Music)
- 2017: Spirit (Stefan Obermaier, Wally Lopez) (Natura Viva)
- 2016: Indigo (Drift Recordings)
- 2015: Sinaye/Dawning (Drift Recordings)
- 2014: Magolie/Monsoon (Drift Recordings)
- 2013: Alpino EP (Drift Recordings)
- 2012: Apia (Drift Recordings)
- 2012: Shishanna EP (Drift Recordings)
- 2012: Traveler (Drift Recordings)
- 2012: Bagana EP (Drift Recordings)
- 2009: Drifter EP (Vienna Scientists Rec.)
- 2004: Inna Fat Dub Combo (Vienna Scientists Rec.)

=== Remixes ===
- 2021: Paax (Tulum) "Wallas" (Stefan Obermaier Remix) (Scorpios Music)
- 2021: Solar Moon "Mwezi" (Stefan Obermaier Remix) (MP Music)
- 2021: Fat Freddy's Drop "Kamo Kamo" (Richard Dorfmeister & Stefan Obermaier Remix) (Best Friends Music)
- 2020: Be Svendsen "Man on the Run" (Richard Dorfmeister & Stefan Obermaier Remix) (Music for Dreams)
- 2019: Antoine Michel "Esperansia" (Richard Dorfmeister & Stefan Obermaier Remix) (Dr. Rich Recordings)
- 2018: To Ricciardi "Segredo feat. Danae (Richard Dorfmeister & Stefan Obermaier Remix) (Sururu Records)
- 2018: Pablo Nouvelle "Sunshine In Stereo" (Richard Dorfmeister & Stefan Obermaier Remix) (Armada Music)
- 2017: Tosca "Friday" (!K7 Records)
- 2017: Christian Pommer "Tin Man" (Richard Dorfmeister & Stefan Obermaier Remix) (Compost Records)
- 2016: Max Doblhoff "Mama Jo feat. Idd Aziz (Hoehenregler Records)
- 2015: Tosca "Open Sky" (!K7 Records)
- 2014: Shantisan "Conexao" (Royal Soul Records))
- 2013: Max Doblhoff "Djemaa" (Clubcruise Music)
- 2013: Rodney Hunter "Midas" (Hunter Recordings)
- 2011: Ed Royal "That's That Shit" feat. BadKat (Invision Rec.)
- 2010: Special Stereo "Save Me" feat. Don Abi (Special Stereo)
- 2009: M "Pop Muzik" (Echo Beach Rec.)
- 2008: Three minutes with Mark Murphy "Secrets" (Vienna Scientists Rec.)
- 2007: Supermax "Camillo" (Universal Music)
- 2006: Timewarp Inc. "The Obsession Bug" (Timewarp Music)
- 2006: Razoof "Spirituality" (Phazz-A-Delic Rec.)

=== Classic Reloaded Project ===
- 2021: Fusion (Universal Music)
- 2012: Mozart Reloaded (Universal Music)
- 2008: Beethoven Reloaded (Universal Music)
- 2006: iMozart Lounge (Universal Music)
