= Obermayer German Jewish History Awards =

The Obermayer German Jewish History Awards were established in 2000 by Dr. Arthur S. Obermayer to pay tribute to non-Jewish Germans who have made outstanding voluntary contributions to preserving the memory of German Jewish communities. These Awards recognize and encourage those who have been devoted to such activities and bring international attention to their work. Five individuals are honored each year.

The Awards are presented annually at the Abgeordnetenhaus of Berlin, the home of the Berlin Parliament. A Distinguished Service Award, an honor bestowed upon extraordinary individuals whose accomplishments fall outside the scope of the specific award guidelines, was first awarded in 2014.

Presentations are in late January to coincide with the commemoration of International Holocaust Remembrance Day, January 27. They are administered and supported by the Obermayer Foundation, with sponsorship, support and organization of the ceremony in Berlin by the Berlin Parliament. They are also co-sponsored by the Leo Baeck Institute (New York) and GerSIG (the German Jewish Special Interest Group of JewishGen.org).

Many Germans have raised awareness of a once-vibrant Jewish history and culture in their communities through public programs, exhibitions, widespread exposure, restoration of synagogues and cemeteries, installation of Holocaust memorials, genealogical research, development of websites, publications, and other activities. They have forged meaningful relationships with former residents and descendants of those who once lived in their towns. They are teachers and engineers, publishers and judges, artists and bankers, lawyers and business executives, and they come from every corner of the country. These volunteers have devoted countless hours to such projects.

Year	Recipients
2000	Gisela Blume, Joachim Hahn (theologian), Ottmar Kagerer, Gernot Römer, Moritz Schmid
2002	Günter Boll, Olaf Ditzel, Monica Kingreen, Josef Motschmann, Heinrich Schreiner
2003	Hans-Eberhard Berkemann, Irene Corbach, Heinrich Dittmar (historian), Gerhard Jochem and Susanne Rieger, Carla and Erika Pick
2004	Lothar Bembenek and Dorothee Lottmann-Kãseler, Klaus-Dieter Ehmke, Cordula Kappner, Jürgen Sielemann, Christiane Walesch-Schneller
2005	Gunter Demnig, Wolfram P. Kastner, Robert Krais, Heinrich Nuhn, Ilse Vogel
2006	Johann Fleischmann, Günter Heidt, Rolf Hofmann, Kurt-Willi Julius, and Karl-Heinz Stadtler, Robert Kreibig
2007	Johannes Bruno, Inge Franken, Lars Menk, Ernst Schäll, Wilfried Weinke
2008	Gerhard Buck, Charlotte Mayenberger, Johanna Rau, Fritz Reuter (historian), Helmut Urbschat and Manfred Kluge
2009	Hans-Dieter Arntz, Klaus Dietermann, Michael Dorhs, Bernhard Gelderblom, Ernst and Brigitte Klein
2010	Angelika Brosig, Helmut Gabeli, Barbara Greve, Heidemarie Kugler-Weiemann, and Walter Ott (See also Walter Ott
2011	Michael Heitz, Peter Koerner, Brigitte Stammer, Barbara Staudacher and Heinz Högerle, Sibylle Tiedemann
2012	Wolfgang Battermann, Rolf Emmerich, Fritz Kilthau, Christa Niclasen, Werner Schubert
2013	Hans-Jürgen Beck, Klaus Beer, Lothar Czossek, Rolf Kilian Kiessling, Hanno Müller
2014	Johannes Grötecke, Frowald Gil Hüttenmeister, Hans-Peter Klein, Silvester Lechner, Steffen Pross; Distinguished Service Awardee: Charlotte Knobloch
2015	Pascale Eberhard, Marlis Glaser, Detlev Herbst, Jörg Kaps, Christian Repkewitz; Distinguished Service Awardees: Renata Stih & Frieder Schnock, Wolfgang Haney
2016	Walter Demandt & Almut Holler, Peter Franz, Elmar Ittenbach, Elisabeth Quirbach und Hans Schulz, Werner Schäfer, Nils Busch-Petersen, Reinhard Führer
2017	Thilo Figaj, GröschlerHaus, Ina Lorenz und Jörg Berkemann, Projekt Jüdisches Leben in Frankfurt, Rolf Schmitt, Leipziger Synagogalchor
2018	Margot Friedländer (Distinguished Service Award), Berliner Schüler, Karl und Hanna Britz, Volker Mall und Harald Roth, Horst Moog, Simon Strauß (as a member of the „Rolf-Joseph-Gruppe“)
2019	Elisabeth Böhrer, Martina und Hans-Dieter Graf, Gabriele Hannah, Michael Imhof, Egon Krüger, Hilde Schramm (Stiftung Zurückgeben), Benigna Schönhagen (Distinguished Service-Award)
2020	Fanprojekt der Sportjugend Berlin und Hertha BSC, Netzwerk für Demokratische Kultur (NDK), Ivana Scharf, Karl-Heinz Nieren, Roland Müller, Norbert Giovannini, Sabeth Schmidthals, Michael Batz
2021	Erich-Zeigner-Haus, Akubiz Pirna, Elisabeth Kahn, Volker Keller, Friederike Fechner, Marion Lilienthal
2022	Erinnerungsort Badehaus, Josef Wißkirchen, Shlomit Tripp (Puppentheater Bubales), Förderkreis Synagoge Laufersweiler and Christof Pies, Verein Treibhaus, Geschichtswerkstatt zeitlupe
