= Erwin Obermair =

Austrian astronomer (1946–2017)

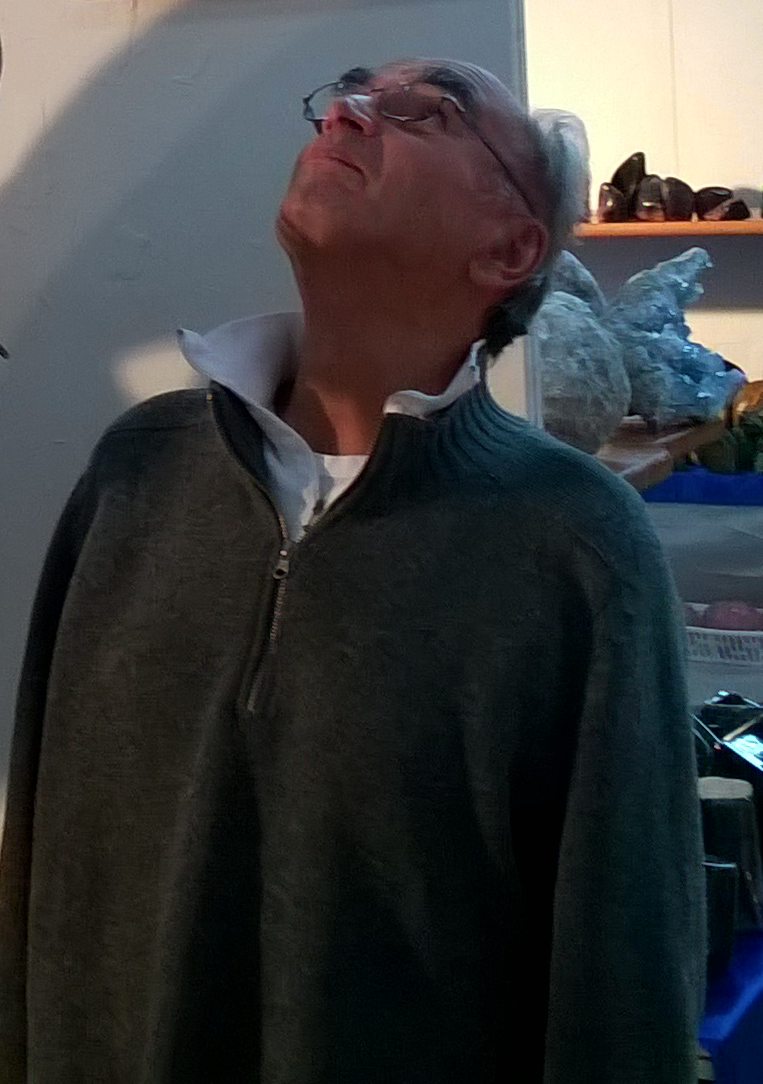
- Born: 29 August 1946; Hargelsberg, Austria
- Died: 15 January 2017 (aged 70); Linz, Austria
- Citizenship: Austria
- Known for: multiple asteroid discoverer
- Awards: Decoration of Honour in Silver of the Republic of Austria.

Minor planets discovered: 10
9097 Davidschlag	14. January 1996	^{[1]} ^{[2]} list
9119 Georgpeuerbach	18. February 1998	^{[1]} ^{[2]} list
14057 Manfredstoll	15. January 1996	^{[1]} list
15949 Rhaeticus	17. January 1998	^{[1]} list
43955 Fixlmüller	6. February 1997	^{[1]} list
48681 Zeilinger	21. January 1996	^{[1]} list
58499 Stüber	3. November 1996	^{[1]} list
85411 Paulflora	3. November 1996	^{[1]} list
100485 Russelldavies	3. November 1996	^{[1]} list
175730 Gramastetten	18. February 1998	^{[1]} ^{[2]} list
^{1} co-discovered with E. Meyer
^{2} co-discovered with H. Raab

Erwin Obermair (29 August 1946 in Hargelsberg – 15 January 2017 in Linz) was an Electrician, Austrian amateur astronomer and co-discoverer of asteroids.

Together with his colleague and amateur astronomer Erich Meyer, Obermair built the private observatory Meyer/Obermair (540) in Davidschlag (municipality Kirchschlag bei Linz, Austria), in 1978. He co-discovered a total of 10 asteroids at this observatory, all together with Meyer. Furthermore, he was involved in three other discoveries of asteroids between 1996 and 2005, which were assigned as site discoveries to the observatory Davidschlag by the International Astronomical Union.

Obermair was a member of the Astronomical Society of Linz (Linzer Astronomische Gemeinschaft), from 1974 until his death he was vice president of that association and made regularly observatory tours most of the time. His most important observations include precisie astrometry of the comet Shoemaker–Levy 9, which he observerd together with Erich Meyer and Herbert Raab in 1993. These observations have significantly contributed to the subsequent prediction of the impact of this comet on the planet Jupiter.

On 4 April 1997, Obermair was presented the Decoration of Honour in Silver of the Republic of Austria. The main-belt asteroid 9236 Obermair, discovered by his college Erich Meyer at Linz in 1997, was named in his honor. Naming citation was published on 4 May 1999 (M.P.C. 34629).

He was well educated in geology and astronomy on top of that a passioned astrophotographer.

Obermair was married.
