= Erich Meyer =

Austrian engineer and amateur astronomer

Minor planets discovered: 27
see § List of discovered minor planets

Erich Meyer (born 6 August 1951) is an Austrian engineer, amateur astronomer and discoverer of asteroids.

== Astronomical career ==
Between 1996 and 1999, using the private observatory Meyer/Obermair in Davidschlag (municipality Kirchschlag bei Linz, Austria), he discovered a total of 21 asteroids. Seven of these asteroids were discovered together with his colleague Erwin Obermair and one together with Herbert Raab. Furthermore, he was involved in six other discoveries of asteroids between 1996 and 2005, which were assigned as site discoveries to the observatory Davidschlag by the International Astronomical Union.

Meyer's most important observations include precisie astrometry of the comet Shoemaker–Levy 9, which he observed together with Erwin Obermair and Herbert Raab in 1993. These observations have significantly contributed to the subsequent prediction of the impact of this comet on the planet Jupiter. In 2018 Erich Meyer was able to identify the residential house of Johannes Kepler in Linz in Hofgasse (house no. 7) - after 400 years.

Meyer is a member of the Astronomical Society of Linz (Linzer Astronomische Gemeinschaft). By profession, he works as an engineer in the field of maintenance of industrial plants.

== Awards and honors ==
On 4 April 1997 Meyer was presented the Decoration of Honour for Services to the Republic of Austria (Silver) of the republic of Austria. The asteroid 7940 Erichmeyer was named in his honor on 10 June 1998. In 2005, Meyer was awarded a "Gene Shoemaker NEO Grant" by the Planetary Society to support his work on near-Earth objects.

== List of discovered minor planets ==
9097 Davidschlag	14 January 1996	list^{[A]}^{[B]}
9236 Obermair	12 March 1997	list
9119 Georgpeuerbach	18 February 1998	list^{[A]}^{[B]}
13682 Pressberger	10 August 1997	list^{[A]}
14057 Manfredstoll	15 January 1996	list^{[B]}
14977 Bressler	26 September 1997	list
15949 Rhaeticus	17 January 1998	list^{[B]}
15955 Johannesgmunden	26 January 1998	list
16802 Rainer	25 September 1997	list
24916 Stelzhamer	7 March 1997	list

26355 Grueber	23 December 1998	list
29427 Oswaldthomas	7 March 1997	list
43955 Fixlmüller	6 February 1997	list^{[B]}
48681 Zeilinger	21 January 1996	list^{[B]}
48801 Penninger	22 October 1997	list
58499 Stüber	3 November 1996	list^{[B]}
85411 Paulflora	3 November 1996	list^{[B]}
96506 Oberösterreich	26 July 1998	list

100417 Philipglass	7 March 1996	list
100485 Russelldavies	3 November 1996	list^{[B]}
130078 Taschner	26 November 1999	list
137632 Ramsauer	26 November 1999	list
175730 Gramastetten	18 February 1998	list
257515 Zapperudi	06 February 1997	list
276568 Joestübler	27 September 2003	list
318723 Bialas	8 September 2005	list
(376215) 2011 DK_{42}	15 January 1996	list
Co-discovery made with:^{A} H. Raab or ^{B} E. Obermair

== See also ==
- List of minor planet discoverers § E. Meyer
