= Herman Obermayer =

American journalist

- Born: Herman Joseph Obermayer; September 19, 1924; Philadelphia, Pennsylvania, U.S.
- Died: May 11, 2016 (aged 91); Arlington, Virginia, U.S.
- Education: Dartmouth College
- Occupations: Journalist, publisher, politician
- Spouse: Betty Nan Levy
- Children: Elizabeth, Helen, Veronica, Adele

Herman Joseph Obermayer (September 19, 1924 – May 11, 2016) was an American journalist, publisher, and politician. He was the owner and publisher of the Long Branch, New Jersey Daily Record from 1957 to 1971 and the Northern Virginia Sun from 1963 to 1989, and counseled newspapers in emerging democracies for the U.S. State Department from 1990 to 2002 in Hungary, Poland, Lithuania, Latvia, Estonia, Ukraine, Moldavia, Slovenia, Macedonia, Russia, Croatia, and Serbia. In 1983 and 1984, he served as a judge for the Pulitzer Prizes.

== Biography ==
Obermayer, a Philadelphia native, graduated from Central High School and cum laude from Dartmouth College in 1946 as an English major, studying under the poet Robert Frost. During World War II, he was a staff sergeant in Europe from 1943 to 1946. He attended the Nuremberg Trials. He broke with the media that sought to avoid giving publicity to George Lincoln Rockwell from the American Nazi Party and thought they should be exposed, after the Hebrew Benevolent Congregation Temple bombing and threats against the Unitarian Universalist Church of Arlington. He was an Eagle Scout and a member of the executive council of the Monmouth County (N.J.) Boy Scout Council from 1958 to 1971 and on the executive committee of the National Capital Council of the Boy Scouts of America from 1971 to 1979. He worked with the Jewish Policy Center and served on the national board of the Jewish Institute for National Security Affairs (JINSA) beginning in 1996 and also with the national council of the American Jewish Committee (AJC).

== Awards ==
- Rhineland Campaign Star

== Bibliography ==
- Soldiering for Freedom: A GI's Account of World War II, 2005;
- Rehnquist M: A Personal Portrait of the Distinguished Chief Justice of the US, 2009
- Jews in the News: British and American Newspaper Articles about Jews 1665 through 1800.
- American Nazi Party in Arlington, Virginia 1958 - 1984, 2012

== Personal life ==
He was the brother of Arthur S. Obermayer. He was married to Betty Nan Levy, daughter of Neville Levy. They have four daughters, Helen Levy-Myers of Reston, Virginia, Veronica Atnipp of Houston, Texas, Adele Malpass of New York City, NY and Elizabeth Weintraub of Rockville, Maryland; 11 grandchildren and one great-granddaughter. Betty Obermayer died on January 26, 2013, and Herman Obermayer died of a heart attack in Arlington, Virginia, on May 11, 2016.

== See also ==
- Tom Loepp
