= Friedrich Märker =

Friedrich Märker (7 March 1893 in Augsburg, Bavaria – 27 April 1985 in Feldafing, Bavaria) was a German writer, essayist, theatre critic and publicist. His work focused on the physiognomy of the Nordic race (during the time of the Nazi regime), time and cultural criticism. He also wrote under the pseudonyms Alexander Stark, Nicholas Haug and Fyodor Ukrainow.

== Biography ==
After studying philosophy, literature and art history in Berlin, Kiel and Munich (1913 to 1916) he worked as a playwright and theater director in Falck (near Munich), Düsseldorf and Leipzig. From 1926 he was a theater critic and arts and community college professor in Berlin. As a theatre critic he also published pieces in the Münchner Zeitung. In 1934, he published his main book on the theory of the Nordic race ("Charakterbilder der Rassen") where he tries to prove by the physiognomy of faces that the Nordic race is superior especially to the "ostic" race (Mongoloid looking Europeans). In 1938 his approach might have caused problems with the Nazi regime so that he perhaps was banned from lecturing by the Nazis.

He met novelist Margaret Willinsky in 1939 and they married. In 1944, at 50 years old, he was drafted into the army until he was released in 1945 after being captured by the Americans.

After the war he added to his literary career by founding numerous writing organizations and was President of the Protective Association of Writers, founding the literary copyright collecting society for that in 1956. In 1959 he was honored with the Great Cross of Merit. From 1952, he was a member of the German PEN club. The Friedrich-Marker-Preis, named in his honor, has awarded prizes for essays since 1986.

== Works ==
- Lebensgefühl und Weltgefühl, 1920
- Typen. Grundlagen der Charakterkunde, 1930
- Lavaters Physiognomische Fragmente. Ausgewählt und kommentiert, 1949
- Symbolik der Gesichtsformen. Physiognomische und mimische Beobachtungen, 1933
- Charakterbilder der Rassen. Bd. 1: Rassenkunde auf physiognomischer und phrenologischer Grundlage, 1934
- Die Kunst, aus dem Gesicht zu lesen, 1971
- Der grosse Widerspruch, 1984, ISBN 3-9800315-6-X
- Hörspiele:
  Der Ackermann und der Tod, 1946
  Die heilige Allianz, 1953
  Abschied in Taganrog, 1953
