= Siegfried Obermeier =

German author of historical novels and popular history books (1936-2011)

- Born: 21 January 1936; Oberschleißheim, Bavaria, Germany
- Died: 21 January 2011 (aged 75)
- Occupation: Author

Siegfried Obermeier (Munich, 21 January 1936 – Oberschleißheim near Munich, 21 January 2011) was a German author of historical novels and popular history books. He was editor of The Secret Diaries of Ludwig II of Bavaria 1976. In 1978 he issued his first novel, initially under the penname Carl de Scott, a novelisation of the second life of Judas Iscariot. His Jesus in India book "Starb Jesus in Kaschmir?" made it to the Year Bestseller List of the Spiegel in 1983.

== Works ==
=== Non fiction ===
- Tourist guidebook to Carinthia 1974
- Katia Mann, Meine ungeschriebenen Memoiren, - The unwritten memoires of Katia Mann Frankfurt 1974
- Münchens Goldene Jahre (The Golden Years of Munich) 1976
- Walter von der Vogelweide Der Spielmann des Reiches. Biography 1980
- Richard Löwenherz. König, Ritter, Abenteurer - Richard the Lionheart Biography 1982
- Starb Jesus in Kaschmir? Das Geheimnis seines Lebens und Wirkens in Indien 1983
- Das geheime Tagebuch König Ludwig II. (editor) 1986
- Die Muse von Rom, Angelika Kauffmann und ihre Zeit - Biography of Angelika Kauffmann, 1987
- Ludwig der Bayer. Herzog und Kaiser Biografie 1989
- Magie und Geheimnis der alten Religionen 1993
- Die unheiligen Väter. Gottes Stellvertreter zwischen Machtgier und Frömmigkeit. Geschichte der Päpste, 1995
- Verlorene Kindheit. Erinnerungen aus der Kriegszeit autobiography 2006
- Eine kurze Geschichte des Monotheismus 2008

=== Fiction ===
- Kreuz und Adler - Das zweite Leben des Judas Ischariot. The Second Life of Judas Iscariot. Novel 1978
- München leuchtet übers Jahr. Ein bayrischer Roman. novel 1985
- Mein Kaiser, mein Herr. Ein Roman aus der Zeit Karls des Großen. novel 1986
- ..und baute ihr einen Tempel. Roman um Ramses II. novel 1987
- Im Schatten des Feuerbergs. Der Roman Siziliens. novel 1989
- Caligula. Der grausame Gott. Novel 1990
- Würd' ich mein Herz der Liebe weihn... Wolfgang Amadeus. novel on Mozart1991
- Torquemada. Der Grossinquisitor - Symbol für Angst und Schrecken. novel 1992
- Im Zeichen der Lilie. novel on Gilles de Rais and Joan of Arc 1994
- Kleopatra. Im Zeichen der Schlange. Ein historischer Roman. 1996
- Die Hexenwaage. Ein Kriminalroman aus dem 17. Jahrhundert. 1997
- Die schwarze Lucretia. Historischer Kriminalroman. 1998
- Echnaton. Im Zeichen der Sonne. novel on Akhnaton 1998
- Don Juan. Der Mann, den die Frauen liebten novel 2000
- Sappho novel 2001
- Messalina. Die lasterhafte Kaiserin. Novel on Valeria Messalina 2002
- "Kreuz und Adler" Die Geschichte des Judas. 2002 (rewritten)
- Salomo und die Königin von Saba. 2004
- Um Liebe und Tod. Das lasterhafte Leben des François Villon. novel 2005
- Das Spiel der Kurtisanen; novel 2008
- Der Narr und die Hexe: Ein Agnes-Bernauer-Roman. Novel on Agnes Bernauer mistress of the Duke of Bavaria. 2010
- Bianca Lancia Die Buhle des Kaisers 2011
