= Kirchschlag bei Linz =

- Municipality
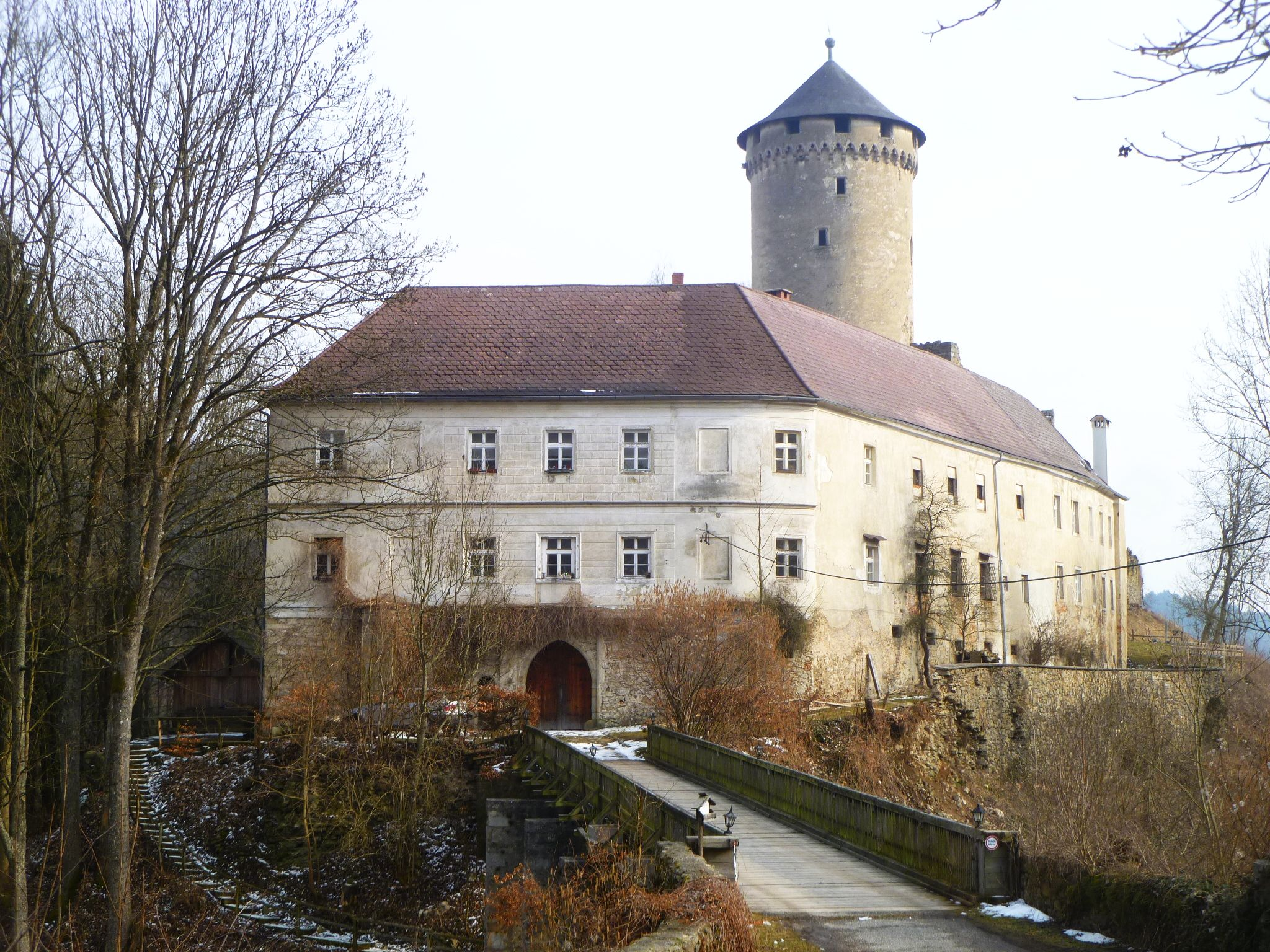
- Wildberg castle

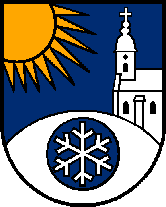
- Coat of arms

- Location within Austria
- Coordinates: 48°24′49″N 14°16′41″E
- Country: Austria
- State: Upper Austria
- District: Urfahr-Umgebung

Government
  - Mayor: Ing. Günter Kaiser (ÖVP)

Area
  - Total: 16.78 km^{2} (6.48 sq mi)
- Elevation: 896 m (2,940 ft)

Population (2018-01-01)
  - Total: 2,138
  - Density: 127.4/km^{2} (330.0/sq mi)
- Time zone: UTC+1 (CET)
  - Summer (DST): UTC+2 (CEST)
- Postal code: 4202
- Area code: 0 72 15
- Vehicle registration: UU
- Website: www.kirchschlag.net

Kirchschlag bei Linz is a municipality in the district of Urfahr-Umgebung in the Austrian state of Upper Austria.

== Population ==
Historical population
Year	Pop.	±%
1991	1,683	—
2001	1,906	+13.3%
