= Meanings of minor-planet names: 49001–50000 =

As minor planet discoveries are confirmed, they are given a permanent number by the IAU's Minor Planet Center (MPC), and the discoverers can then submit names for them, following the IAU's naming conventions. The list below concerns those minor planets in the specified number-range that have received names, and explains the meanings of those names.

Official naming citations of newly named small Solar System bodies are approved and published in a bulletin by IAU's Working Group for Small Bodies Nomenclature (WGSBN). Before May 2021, citations were published in MPC's Minor Planet Circulars for many decades. Recent citations can also be found on the JPL Small-Body Database (SBDB). Until his death in 2016, German astronomer Lutz D. Schmadel compiled these citations into the Dictionary of Minor Planet Names (DMP) and regularly updated the collection.

Based on Paul Herget's The Names of the Minor Planets, Schmadel also researched the unclear origin of numerous asteroids, most of which had been named prior to World War II. This article incorporates text from this source, which is in the public domain: SBDB New namings may only be added to this list below after official publication as the preannouncement of names is condemned. The WGSBN publishes a comprehensive guideline for the naming rules of non-cometary small Solar System bodies.

== 49001–49100 ==
Named minor planet	Provisional	This minor planet was named for...	Ref · Catalog
49036 Pelion	1998 QM_{107}	Pelion, a mountain in Thessaly in central Greece, where the Centaurs were said to live	JPL · 49036

== 49101–49200 ==
back to top

Named minor planet	Provisional	This minor planet was named for...	Ref · Catalog
49106 Janry	1998 SY	Jean-Richard "Janry" Geurts, Belgian comics artist and amateur astronomer	IAU · 49106
49108 Gouttesolard	1998 SQ_{1}	Michel Gouttesolard (b. 1958), a French amateur astronomer.	IAU · 49108
49109 Agnesraab	1998 SO_{2}	Agnes Raab (born 1969), Austrian amateur astronomer, long-time member of the Astronomical Society of Linz (German: Linzer Astronomische Gemeinschaft). The first prediscovery image of this asteroid was found on a plate exposed on her eighth birthday. She is married to Herbert Raab, also an amateur astronomer and discoverer of minor planets (Src).	JPL · 49109
49110 Květafialová	1998 SU_{2}	Květa Fialová (born 1929) is a well-known actress in Czech-Slovak cinematography and theatre, who has been active for almost 70 years	JPL · 49110
49118 Sergerochain	1998 SL_{10}	Serge Rochain (b. 1942), a French computer engineer and amateur astronomer.	IAU · 49118
49187 Zucchini	1998 SY_{75}	Roberto Zucchini (born 1958) is an Italian theoretical physicist who teaches theoretical physics and mathematical methods at the Bologna University. His interests reside in the mathematical physics concerning theories of quantum gravity, strings and branes.	JPL · 49187

== 49201–49300 ==
back to top

Named minor planet	Provisional	This minor planet was named for...	Ref · Catalog
49265 Raphaeljimenez	1998 UM_{3}	Raphael Jimenez (b. 1950), also known as Jimmy, is a technician of the Pic du Midi Observatory.	IAU49265
49272 Bryce Canyon	1998 UT_{16}	Bryce Canyon National Park, Utah, home of some of the darkest night skies in the continental United States	JPL · 49272
49291 Thechills	1998 VJ	The Chills are a New Zealand rock band formed in Dunedin in 1980. Images of this asteroid, taken by its discoverer Ian P. Griffin, were shown on the release of the band's new single "Rocket Science/Lost In Space".	IAU · 49291
49294 Jacqclairnoëns	1998 VG_{2}	Jacques-Clair Noëns (b. 1945), a French astronomer at Pic-du-Midi Observatory.	IAU49294
49296 Lucdettwiller	1998 VD_{3}	Luc Dettwiller (b. 1958), a French physicist and professor at Chaires Supérieures.	IAU49296

== 49301–49400 ==
back to top

Named minor planet	Provisional	This minor planet was named for...	Ref · Catalog
49350 Katheynix	1998 WQ_{8}	Kathey Nix (1953–2003), an American amateur astronomer, manager of theaters for the Pink Palace Museum, Memphis, Tennessee, and a founding member of the Society of Low-Energy Observers (SLO). Her enthusiasm and selfless dedication to amateur astronomy and to her many friends will be sorely missed.	JPL · 49350
49382 Lynnokamoto	1998 XG_{5}	Lynn Okamoto (born 1971) is a Japanese manga artist best known for his manga and anime series Elfen Lied. He resides in Tokyo, Japan.	JPL · 49382
49384 Hubertnaudot	1998 XX_{9}	Hubert Naudot (1913–1994), a French engineer a pioneer of astronomical calculations using personal computers in the 1980s. He worked for the French Railways (SNCF) and was involved in the creation of the astronomical association of the SNCF. He also taught astronomy to children.	JPL · 49384

== 49401–49500 ==
back to top

Named minor planet	Provisional	This minor planet was named for...	Ref · Catalog
49439 Jeanlouispala	1998 YC_{5}	Jean-Louis Pala (b. 1950), a French mathematics teacher at the Institution Sainte Marie in Cannes.	IAU49439
49440 Kenzotange	1998 YP_{5}	Kenzo Tange (1913–2005), a Japanese architect who designed many public buildings, including the Hiroshima Peace Memorial Museum, the Kagawa Prefectural Office and the Tokyo Metropolitan Government Buildings.	JPL · 49440
49441 Scerbanenco	1998 YM_{6}	Giorgio Scerbanenco (1911–1969) was a Ukrainian-born Italian writer, best known for his crime and detective novels. He was one of the fathers of the thriller genre in Italy. He wrote The scandal of the astronomical observatory, a thriller which revolves around the discovery of a new asteroid.	JPL · 49441
49442 Kubokoichi	1998 YD_{7}	Koichi Kubo, secretary of the Korino Observatory in Minamisatsuma City, Kagoshima Prefecture.	IAU · 49442
49443 Marcobondi	1998 YN_{7}	Marco Bondi (born 1963), an Italian astrophysicist who works at the Istituto Nazionale di Astrofisica in Bologna, where his research activity is mainly focused on radio studies of active galactic nuclei and star-forming galaxies. His multiwavelength surveys are aimed at investigating the properties and cosmological evolution of the sub-millijansky population.	JPL · 49443
49448 Macocha	1998 YJ_{12}	The Macocha Gorge, a very popular visitor site in the Czech Republic. The sinkhole is 168 meters deep and was formed in the early Pleistocene era. It is part of the Moravian Karst, a cave system created by the lost river Punkva.	JPL · 49448
49466 Huanglin	1999 AX_{8}	Huang Lin (born 1934) is an observational astrophysicist and has made significant contributions to developing the research of stellar physics at Beijing Astronomical Observatory. He shared a First Class National Science and Technology Progress Award for participating in building the first 2-meter class optical telescope in China.	JPL · 49466
49469 Emilianomazzoni	1999 AL_{25}	Emiliano Mazzoni (born 1953), is an Italian amateur astronomer from Tuscany, expert telescope maker and discoverer of minor planets and supernovae, who founded the Monte Agliale Observatory (159).	JPL · 49469
49481 Gisellarubini	1999 BJ_{12}	Gisella Rubini (born 1959), girlfriend of the Italian discoverer Matteo Santangelo. She sometimes helps him at the Monte Agliale Observatory (159).	JPL · 49481
49497 Tagashiramitsuo	1999 CM_{3}	Mitsuo Tagashira, Japanese amateur astronomer.	IAU · 49497
49500 Ishitoshi	1999 CP_{9}	Toshihiro Ishikawa (born 1975) is a Japanese amateur astronomer and a key member of the Ota Astronomical Club.	JPL · 49500

== 49501–49600 ==
back to top

Named minor planet	Provisional	This minor planet was named for...	Ref · Catalog
49501 Basso	1999 CN_{10}	Antonella Basso (born 1972), a friend of the Italian discoverer Gianluca Masi. A lawyer by profession, she has a great passion and interest in the arts, particularly in painting and cinema.	JPL · 49501

== 49601–49700 ==
back to top

Named minor planet	Provisional	This minor planet was named for...	Ref · Catalog
49698 Váchal	1999 VA	Josef Váchal (1884–1969), a Czech artist whose specific work combined graphic art, wood carving, handmade printing, poetry and writing on the borderline of symbolism, secession and expressionism. His masterpieces include The Bloody Romance and Šumava mountains dying and romantic.	JPL · 49698
49699 Hidetakasato	1999 VZ	Hidetaka Sato (born 1978), Japanese obstetrician and an amateur astronomer interested in small Solar System bodies. He observes comets and unusual minor planets at the Gunma Astronomical Observatory (D80) and at the Rent-a-Scope observatories.	JPL · 49699
49700 Mather	1999 VN_{1}	John C. Mather (born 1946), an American cosmologist and senior project scientist for the James Webb Space Telescope. He led the team that constructed the Cosmic Background Explorer (COBE). For his role in mapping microwave radiation and understanding the early Universe he received the 2006 Nobel prize in physics.	JPL · 49700

== 49701–49800 ==
back to top

Named minor planet	Provisional	This minor planet was named for...	Ref · Catalog
49702 Koikeda	1999 VC_{2}	Chuzo Koikeda (born 1928), a Japanese amateur astronomer, was president of "Kanazawa hoshinokai", an astronomy club in Kanazawa, from 1962 to 2002. His wife Yoko Koikeda (born 1932), also an amateur astronomer, is a serious observer of the Sun, solar eclipses and aurorae.	JPL · 49702
49777 Cappi	1999 XS	Margaret Capitola Sonntag Comba (born 1940), second wife of American amateur astronomer Paul G. Comba, who discovered this minor planet. She is a psychologist and art therapist by profession and a faculty member at Prescott College.	JPL · 49777

== 49801–49900 ==
back to top

Named minor planet	Provisional	This minor planet was named for...	Ref · Catalog
There are no named minor planets in this number range

== 49901–50000 ==
back to top

Named minor planet	Provisional	This minor planet was named for...	Ref · Catalog
49987 Bonata	2000 AB_{5}	Diego Bonata (born 1968), an Italian aerospace engineer who has promoted laws for the control of light pollution and energy saving through the Cielobuio Association, of which he is president. At the Carl Sagan Observatory in Brignano Gera d´Adda he has developed new environmentally compatible technologies for lighting engineering.	JPL · 49987
50000 Quaoar	2002 LM_{60}	Quaoar, a creation deity in Tongva mythology. The Tongva are the indigenous people of the Los Angeles basin. Quaoar has no form or gender and dances and sings Weywot, Sky Father, into existence. Together, they create Chehooit, Earth Mother, and the trio bring Tamit, Grandfather Sun, to life.	JPL · 50000

back to top

Preceded by 48,001–49,000	Meanings of minor-planet names List of minor planets: 49,001–50,000	Succeeded by 50,001–51,000
