= List of minor planets: 49001–50000 =

The following is a partial list of minor planets, running from minor-planet number 49001 through 50000, inclusive. The primary data for this and other partial lists is based on JPL's "Small-Body Orbital Elements" and data available from the Minor Planet Center. Critical list information is also provided by the MPC, unless otherwise specified from Lowell Observatory. A detailed description of the table's columns and additional sources are given on the main page including a complete list of every page in this series, and a statistical break-up on the dynamical classification of minor planets.

Also see the summary list of all named bodies in numerical and alphabetical order, and the corresponding naming citations for the number range of this particular list. New namings may only be added to this list after official publication, as the preannouncement of names is condemned by the Working Group for Small Bodies Nomenclature of the International Astronomical Union.

Near-Earth obj.	MBA (inner)	MBA (outer)	Centaur
Mars-crosser	MBA (middle)	Jupiter trojan	Trans-Neptunian obj.
Unclassified

== 49001–49100 ==
Designation			Discovery			Properties		Ref
Permanent	Provisional	Named after	Date	Site	Discoverer(s)	Category	Diam.	Ref
49001	1998 QZ_{54}	—	August 27, 1998	Anderson Mesa	LONEOS	·	5.2 km	MPC · JPL
49002	1998 QX_{57}	—	August 30, 1998	Kitt Peak	Spacewatch	·	4.1 km	MPC · JPL
49003	1998 QC_{58}	—	August 30, 1998	Kitt Peak	Spacewatch	MAS	2.1 km	MPC · JPL
49004	1998 QK_{61}	—	August 26, 1998	Anderson Mesa	LONEOS	V	2.7 km	MPC · JPL
49005	1998 QN_{62}	—	August 27, 1998	Xinglong	SCAP	fast	2.3 km	MPC · JPL
49006	1998 QL_{63}	—	August 31, 1998	Bergisch Gladbach	W. Bickel	·	2.6 km	MPC · JPL
49007	1998 QF_{67}	—	August 24, 1998	Socorro	LINEAR	·	6.3 km	MPC · JPL
49008	1998 QY_{68}	—	August 24, 1998	Socorro	LINEAR	·	3.7 km	MPC · JPL
49009	1998 QZ_{68}	—	August 24, 1998	Socorro	LINEAR	·	5.0 km	MPC · JPL
49010	1998 QF_{72}	—	August 24, 1998	Socorro	LINEAR	·	3.3 km	MPC · JPL
49011	1998 QQ_{72}	—	August 24, 1998	Socorro	LINEAR	·	2.8 km	MPC · JPL
49012	1998 QR_{72}	—	August 24, 1998	Socorro	LINEAR	V	2.5 km	MPC · JPL
49013	1998 QW_{73}	—	August 24, 1998	Socorro	LINEAR	·	5.9 km	MPC · JPL
49014	1998 QQ_{74}	—	August 24, 1998	Socorro	LINEAR	PHO	5.1 km	MPC · JPL
49015	1998 QG_{75}	—	August 24, 1998	Socorro	LINEAR	V	1.6 km	MPC · JPL
49016	1998 QJ_{77}	—	August 24, 1998	Socorro	LINEAR	·	5.5 km	MPC · JPL
49017	1998 QN_{77}	—	August 24, 1998	Socorro	LINEAR	·	3.0 km	MPC · JPL
49018	1998 QY_{84}	—	August 24, 1998	Socorro	LINEAR	·	3.6 km	MPC · JPL
49019	1998 QF_{85}	—	August 24, 1998	Socorro	LINEAR	MAR	4.6 km	MPC · JPL
49020	1998 QP_{86}	—	August 24, 1998	Socorro	LINEAR	·	3.0 km	MPC · JPL
49021	1998 QL_{89}	—	August 24, 1998	Socorro	LINEAR	·	3.4 km	MPC · JPL
49022	1998 QV_{91}	—	August 28, 1998	Socorro	LINEAR	NYS	2.7 km	MPC · JPL
49023	1998 QQ_{93}	—	August 28, 1998	Socorro	LINEAR	·	5.9 km	MPC · JPL
49024	1998 QX_{95}	—	August 19, 1998	Socorro	LINEAR	·	6.5 km	MPC · JPL
49025	1998 QL_{96}	—	August 19, 1998	Socorro	LINEAR	·	2.1 km	MPC · JPL
49026	1998 QW_{98}	—	August 26, 1998	La Silla	E. W. Elst	·	3.0 km	MPC · JPL
49027	1998 QA_{99}	—	August 26, 1998	La Silla	E. W. Elst	·	2.9 km	MPC · JPL
49028	1998 QM_{99}	—	August 26, 1998	La Silla	E. W. Elst	·	4.1 km	MPC · JPL
49029	1998 QN_{102}	—	August 26, 1998	La Silla	E. W. Elst	·	4.0 km	MPC · JPL
49030	1998 QL_{103}	—	August 26, 1998	La Silla	E. W. Elst	·	2.0 km	MPC · JPL
49031	1998 QT_{103}	—	August 26, 1998	La Silla	E. W. Elst	·	2.9 km	MPC · JPL
49032	1998 QS_{104}	—	August 26, 1998	La Silla	E. W. Elst	V	1.9 km	MPC · JPL
49033	1998 QL_{105}	—	August 25, 1998	La Silla	E. W. Elst	·	2.7 km	MPC · JPL
49034	1998 QS_{105}	—	August 25, 1998	La Silla	E. W. Elst	·	2.3 km	MPC · JPL
49035	1998 QX_{106}	—	August 25, 1998	La Silla	E. W. Elst	·	2.1 km	MPC · JPL
49036 Pelion	1998 QM_{107}	Pelion	August 21, 1998	Mauna Kea	Whiteley, R. J., D. J. Tholen	centaur	50 km	MPC · JPL
49037	1998 QV_{107}	—	August 17, 1998	Socorro	LINEAR	NYS	3.2 km	MPC · JPL
49038	1998 QY_{109}	—	August 23, 1998	Socorro	LINEAR	·	3.4 km	MPC · JPL
49039	1998 RH	—	September 1, 1998	Woomera	F. B. Zoltowski	V	3.1 km	MPC · JPL
49040	1998 RO	—	September 9, 1998	Caussols	ODAS	·	2.8 km	MPC · JPL
49041	1998 RW	—	September 12, 1998	Oizumi	T. Kobayashi	V	1.6 km	MPC · JPL
49042	1998 RD_{2}	—	September 12, 1998	Woomera	F. B. Zoltowski	NYS	3.3 km	MPC · JPL
49043	1998 RG_{4}	—	September 14, 1998	Socorro	LINEAR	PHO	3.4 km	MPC · JPL
49044	1998 RL_{15}	—	September 15, 1998	Kitt Peak	Spacewatch	MAS	2.1 km	MPC · JPL
49045	1998 RC_{17}	—	September 14, 1998	Socorro	LINEAR	NYS	2.4 km	MPC · JPL
49046	1998 RV_{18}	—	September 14, 1998	Socorro	LINEAR	NYS	3.8 km	MPC · JPL
49047	1998 RK_{20}	—	September 14, 1998	Socorro	LINEAR	V	1.3 km	MPC · JPL
49048	1998 RZ_{21}	—	September 15, 1998	Kitt Peak	Spacewatch	·	2.6 km	MPC · JPL
49049	1998 RF_{25}	—	September 14, 1998	Socorro	LINEAR	·	2.3 km	MPC · JPL
49050	1998 RL_{26}	—	September 14, 1998	Socorro	LINEAR	·	2.3 km	MPC · JPL
49051	1998 RW_{27}	—	September 14, 1998	Socorro	LINEAR	V	1.8 km	MPC · JPL
49052	1998 RV_{32}	—	September 14, 1998	Socorro	LINEAR	·	3.8 km	MPC · JPL
49053	1998 RY_{33}	—	September 14, 1998	Socorro	LINEAR	·	4.9 km	MPC · JPL
49054	1998 RQ_{34}	—	September 14, 1998	Socorro	LINEAR	·	5.1 km	MPC · JPL
49055	1998 RQ_{35}	—	September 14, 1998	Socorro	LINEAR	NYS	3.4 km	MPC · JPL
49056	1998 RZ_{39}	—	September 14, 1998	Socorro	LINEAR	·	2.3 km	MPC · JPL
49057	1998 RZ_{41}	—	September 14, 1998	Socorro	LINEAR	EUN	2.9 km	MPC · JPL
49058	1998 RQ_{42}	—	September 14, 1998	Socorro	LINEAR	·	2.9 km	MPC · JPL
49059	1998 RP_{44}	—	September 14, 1998	Socorro	LINEAR	·	4.4 km	MPC · JPL
49060	1998 RJ_{46}	—	September 14, 1998	Socorro	LINEAR	DOR	6.3 km	MPC · JPL
49061	1998 RF_{47}	—	September 14, 1998	Socorro	LINEAR	V	1.9 km	MPC · JPL
49062	1998 RR_{47}	—	September 14, 1998	Socorro	LINEAR	·	3.4 km	MPC · JPL
49063	1998 RN_{48}	—	September 14, 1998	Socorro	LINEAR	·	2.9 km	MPC · JPL
49064	1998 RV_{49}	—	September 14, 1998	Socorro	LINEAR	·	3.2 km	MPC · JPL
49065	1998 RE_{50}	—	September 14, 1998	Socorro	LINEAR	·	2.8 km	MPC · JPL
49066	1998 RN_{53}	—	September 14, 1998	Socorro	LINEAR	·	3.2 km	MPC · JPL
49067	1998 RP_{53}	—	September 14, 1998	Socorro	LINEAR	·	3.7 km	MPC · JPL
49068	1998 RF_{54}	—	September 14, 1998	Socorro	LINEAR	·	3.0 km	MPC · JPL
49069	1998 RM_{54}	—	September 14, 1998	Socorro	LINEAR	·	1.9 km	MPC · JPL
49070	1998 RV_{54}	—	September 14, 1998	Socorro	LINEAR	·	3.2 km	MPC · JPL
49071	1998 RQ_{56}	—	September 14, 1998	Socorro	LINEAR	V	2.4 km	MPC · JPL
49072	1998 RY_{57}	—	September 14, 1998	Socorro	LINEAR	·	4.0 km	MPC · JPL
49073	1998 RA_{58}	—	September 14, 1998	Socorro	LINEAR	NYS	1.7 km	MPC · JPL
49074	1998 RE_{58}	—	September 14, 1998	Socorro	LINEAR	·	3.2 km	MPC · JPL
49075	1998 RJ_{58}	—	September 14, 1998	Socorro	LINEAR	·	1.8 km	MPC · JPL
49076	1998 RB_{59}	—	September 14, 1998	Socorro	LINEAR	·	2.0 km	MPC · JPL
49077	1998 RT_{59}	—	September 14, 1998	Socorro	LINEAR	·	2.8 km	MPC · JPL
49078	1998 RX_{59}	—	September 14, 1998	Socorro	LINEAR	·	3.4 km	MPC · JPL
49079	1998 RJ_{62}	—	September 14, 1998	Socorro	LINEAR	·	2.5 km	MPC · JPL
49080	1998 RP_{63}	—	September 14, 1998	Socorro	LINEAR	·	2.8 km	MPC · JPL
49081	1998 RA_{64}	—	September 14, 1998	Socorro	LINEAR	NYS	9.8 km	MPC · JPL
49082	1998 RB_{64}	—	September 14, 1998	Socorro	LINEAR	EUN	4.3 km	MPC · JPL
49083	1998 RS_{64}	—	September 14, 1998	Socorro	LINEAR	MAR	3.4 km	MPC · JPL
49084	1998 RU_{65}	—	September 14, 1998	Socorro	LINEAR	NYS	2.8 km	MPC · JPL
49085	1998 RO_{67}	—	September 14, 1998	Socorro	LINEAR	V	2.1 km	MPC · JPL
49086	1998 RB_{68}	—	September 14, 1998	Socorro	LINEAR	·	4.3 km	MPC · JPL
49087	1998 RC_{68}	—	September 14, 1998	Socorro	LINEAR	·	2.7 km	MPC · JPL
49088	1998 RS_{68}	—	September 14, 1998	Socorro	LINEAR	·	4.3 km	MPC · JPL
49089	1998 RR_{69}	—	September 14, 1998	Socorro	LINEAR	NYS ·	2.8 km	MPC · JPL
49090	1998 RV_{69}	—	September 14, 1998	Socorro	LINEAR	NYS	3.6 km	MPC · JPL
49091	1998 RZ_{70}	—	September 14, 1998	Socorro	LINEAR	·	3.6 km	MPC · JPL
49092	1998 RK_{71}	—	September 14, 1998	Socorro	LINEAR	·	2.8 km	MPC · JPL
49093	1998 RG_{72}	—	September 14, 1998	Socorro	LINEAR	·	7.1 km	MPC · JPL
49094	1998 RQ_{72}	—	September 14, 1998	Socorro	LINEAR	NYS	2.3 km	MPC · JPL
49095	1998 RT_{72}	—	September 14, 1998	Socorro	LINEAR	·	2.7 km	MPC · JPL
49096	1998 RL_{73}	—	September 14, 1998	Socorro	LINEAR	·	3.9 km	MPC · JPL
49097	1998 RU_{73}	—	September 14, 1998	Socorro	LINEAR	·	2.9 km	MPC · JPL
49098	1998 RZ_{73}	—	September 14, 1998	Socorro	LINEAR	·	5.9 km	MPC · JPL
49099	1998 RB_{74}	—	September 14, 1998	Socorro	LINEAR	·	7.4 km	MPC · JPL
49100	1998 RT_{74}	—	September 14, 1998	Socorro	LINEAR	NYS	7.9 km	MPC · JPL

== 49101–49200 ==
back to top

Designation			Discovery			Properties		Ref
Permanent	Provisional	Named after	Date	Site	Discoverer(s)	Category	Diam.	Ref
49101	1998 RE_{76}	—	September 14, 1998	Socorro	LINEAR	V	2.4 km	MPC · JPL
49102	1998 RQ_{76}	—	September 14, 1998	Socorro	LINEAR	NYS	3.0 km	MPC · JPL
49103	1998 RE_{78}	—	September 14, 1998	Socorro	LINEAR	NYS	3.2 km	MPC · JPL
49104	1998 RC_{79}	—	September 14, 1998	Socorro	LINEAR	·	3.6 km	MPC · JPL
49105	1998 RT_{79}	—	September 14, 1998	Socorro	LINEAR	NYS	3.0 km	MPC · JPL
49106 Janry	1998 SY	Janry	September 16, 1998	Caussols	ODAS	(5)	3.5 km	MPC · JPL
49107	1998 SG_{1}	—	September 16, 1998	Caussols	ODAS	·	2.5 km	MPC · JPL
49108 Gouttesolard	1998 SQ_{1}	Gouttesolard	September 16, 1998	Caussols	ODAS	·	3.9 km	MPC · JPL
49109 Agnesraab	1998 SO_{2}	Agnesraab	September 18, 1998	Lime Creek	R. Linderholm	EUN	3.0 km	MPC · JPL
49110 Květafialová	1998 SU_{2}	Květafialová	September 16, 1998	Ondřejov	P. Pravec, L. Kotková	·	4.1 km	MPC · JPL
49111	1998 SE_{6}	—	September 20, 1998	Kitt Peak	Spacewatch	·	3.5 km	MPC · JPL
49112	1998 SF_{6}	—	September 20, 1998	Kitt Peak	Spacewatch	·	2.5 km	MPC · JPL
49113	1998 SK_{7}	—	September 20, 1998	Kitt Peak	Spacewatch	·	2.6 km	MPC · JPL
49114	1998 ST_{7}	—	September 20, 1998	Kitt Peak	Spacewatch	NYS	3.8 km	MPC · JPL
49115	1998 SL_{9}	—	September 17, 1998	Xinglong	SCAP	·	2.0 km	MPC · JPL
49116	1998 SX_{9}	—	September 18, 1998	Višnjan Observatory	Višnjan	(5)	3.2 km	MPC · JPL
49117	1998 SC_{10}	—	September 16, 1998	Caussols	ODAS	GEF	4.7 km	MPC · JPL
49118 Sergerochain	1998 SL_{10}	Sergerochain	September 19, 1998	Caussols	ODAS	·	4.6 km	MPC · JPL
49119	1998 SX_{11}	—	September 19, 1998	Caussols	ODAS	·	3.1 km	MPC · JPL
49120	1998 SJ_{12}	—	September 17, 1998	Višnjan Observatory	Višnjan	NYS	3.5 km	MPC · JPL
49121	1998 SL_{14}	—	September 17, 1998	Anderson Mesa	LONEOS	·	2.2 km	MPC · JPL
49122	1998 SR_{14}	—	September 17, 1998	Anderson Mesa	LONEOS	·	3.2 km	MPC · JPL
49123	1998 SX_{16}	—	September 17, 1998	Kitt Peak	Spacewatch	·	4.2 km	MPC · JPL
49124	1998 SF_{17}	—	September 17, 1998	Kitt Peak	Spacewatch	MAS	1.6 km	MPC · JPL
49125	1998 SB_{22}	—	September 23, 1998	Višnjan Observatory	Višnjan	·	2.6 km	MPC · JPL
49126	1998 SF_{22}	—	September 23, 1998	Višnjan Observatory	Višnjan	·	2.3 km	MPC · JPL
49127	1998 ST_{22}	—	September 24, 1998	Višnjan Observatory	Višnjan	EUN	3.4 km	MPC · JPL
49128	1998 SD_{23}	—	September 17, 1998	Anderson Mesa	LONEOS	(5)	2.5 km	MPC · JPL
49129	1998 SW_{23}	—	September 17, 1998	Anderson Mesa	LONEOS	·	4.2 km	MPC · JPL
49130	1998 SQ_{24}	—	September 17, 1998	Anderson Mesa	LONEOS	(5)	2.8 km	MPC · JPL
49131	1998 SV_{24}	—	September 17, 1998	Anderson Mesa	LONEOS	(5)	3.4 km	MPC · JPL
49132	1998 SW_{24}	—	September 17, 1998	Anderson Mesa	LONEOS	·	4.4 km	MPC · JPL
49133	1998 SC_{25}	—	September 19, 1998	Anderson Mesa	LONEOS	·	2.7 km	MPC · JPL
49134	1998 SF_{27}	—	September 18, 1998	Višnjan Observatory	Višnjan	MAS	2.5 km	MPC · JPL
49135	1998 SP_{28}	—	September 17, 1998	Kitt Peak	Spacewatch	·	5.9 km	MPC · JPL
49136	1998 SY_{33}	—	September 26, 1998	Socorro	LINEAR	JUN	2.4 km	MPC · JPL
49137	1998 SC_{35}	—	September 26, 1998	Socorro	LINEAR	·	5.7 km	MPC · JPL
49138	1998 SV_{36}	—	September 20, 1998	Kitt Peak	Spacewatch	·	3.2 km	MPC · JPL
49139	1998 SF_{37}	—	September 21, 1998	Kitt Peak	Spacewatch	·	4.3 km	MPC · JPL
49140	1998 SU_{40}	—	September 25, 1998	Kitt Peak	Spacewatch	·	2.8 km	MPC · JPL
49141	1998 SM_{41}	—	September 25, 1998	Kitt Peak	Spacewatch	·	4.8 km	MPC · JPL
49142	1998 SQ_{42}	—	September 23, 1998	Farra d'Isonzo	Farra d'Isonzo	·	2.4 km	MPC · JPL
49143	1998 SK_{43}	—	September 23, 1998	Xinglong	SCAP	·	3.8 km	MPC · JPL
49144	1998 SB_{46}	—	September 25, 1998	Kitt Peak	Spacewatch	·	3.0 km	MPC · JPL
49145	1998 SD_{46}	—	September 25, 1998	Kitt Peak	Spacewatch	·	3.2 km	MPC · JPL
49146	1998 SN_{48}	—	September 27, 1998	Kitt Peak	Spacewatch	·	5.6 km	MPC · JPL
49147	1998 SR_{48}	—	September 27, 1998	Kitt Peak	Spacewatch	(5)	3.1 km	MPC · JPL
49148	1998 SB_{49}	—	September 23, 1998	Višnjan Observatory	Višnjan	·	2.6 km	MPC · JPL
49149	1998 SD_{49}	—	September 24, 1998	Višnjan Observatory	Višnjan	NYS	2.8 km	MPC · JPL
49150	1998 SO_{50}	—	September 26, 1998	Kitt Peak	Spacewatch	·	5.5 km	MPC · JPL
49151	1998 SM_{51}	—	September 27, 1998	Kitt Peak	Spacewatch	·	2.6 km	MPC · JPL
49152	1998 SQ_{52}	—	September 29, 1998	Kitt Peak	Spacewatch	·	4.5 km	MPC · JPL
49153	1998 ST_{52}	—	September 30, 1998	Kitt Peak	Spacewatch	·	3.1 km	MPC · JPL
49154	1998 SM_{53}	—	September 16, 1998	Anderson Mesa	LONEOS	·	3.0 km	MPC · JPL
49155	1998 SZ_{53}	—	September 16, 1998	Anderson Mesa	LONEOS	·	4.2 km	MPC · JPL
49156	1998 SN_{54}	—	September 16, 1998	Anderson Mesa	LONEOS	V	3.9 km	MPC · JPL
49157	1998 SQ_{54}	—	September 16, 1998	Anderson Mesa	LONEOS	NYS	3.4 km	MPC · JPL
49158	1998 SB_{55}	—	September 16, 1998	Anderson Mesa	LONEOS	NYS	3.1 km	MPC · JPL
49159	1998 SK_{55}	—	September 16, 1998	Anderson Mesa	LONEOS	NYS	2.4 km	MPC · JPL
49160	1998 SW_{55}	—	September 16, 1998	Anderson Mesa	LONEOS	·	2.1 km	MPC · JPL
49161	1998 SE_{56}	—	September 16, 1998	Anderson Mesa	LONEOS	·	5.3 km	MPC · JPL
49162	1998 SO_{56}	—	September 16, 1998	Anderson Mesa	LONEOS	NYS	3.1 km	MPC · JPL
49163	1998 SQ_{56}	—	September 17, 1998	Anderson Mesa	LONEOS	·	2.9 km	MPC · JPL
49164	1998 ST_{56}	—	September 17, 1998	Anderson Mesa	LONEOS	NYS	5.9 km	MPC · JPL
49165	1998 SU_{56}	—	September 17, 1998	Anderson Mesa	LONEOS	·	3.4 km	MPC · JPL
49166	1998 SL_{57}	—	September 17, 1998	Anderson Mesa	LONEOS	·	3.5 km	MPC · JPL
49167	1998 SP_{57}	—	September 17, 1998	Anderson Mesa	LONEOS	·	2.8 km	MPC · JPL
49168	1998 SB_{58}	—	September 17, 1998	Anderson Mesa	LONEOS	·	1.8 km	MPC · JPL
49169	1998 SL_{59}	—	September 17, 1998	Anderson Mesa	LONEOS	MAS	1.9 km	MPC · JPL
49170	1998 SN_{59}	—	September 17, 1998	Anderson Mesa	LONEOS	·	2.9 km	MPC · JPL
49171	1998 SD_{60}	—	September 17, 1998	Anderson Mesa	LONEOS	·	3.1 km	MPC · JPL
49172	1998 SE_{60}	—	September 17, 1998	Anderson Mesa	LONEOS	·	4.1 km	MPC · JPL
49173	1998 SQ_{63}	—	September 29, 1998	Xinglong	SCAP	·	2.7 km	MPC · JPL
49174	1998 SA_{64}	—	September 20, 1998	La Silla	E. W. Elst	·	4.4 km	MPC · JPL
49175	1998 SG_{65}	—	September 20, 1998	La Silla	E. W. Elst	·	2.6 km	MPC · JPL
49176	1998 SS_{65}	—	September 20, 1998	La Silla	E. W. Elst	·	3.1 km	MPC · JPL
49177	1998 SU_{65}	—	September 20, 1998	La Silla	E. W. Elst	·	3.1 km	MPC · JPL
49178	1998 SB_{67}	—	September 20, 1998	La Silla	E. W. Elst	(5)	2.2 km	MPC · JPL
49179	1998 SC_{67}	—	September 20, 1998	La Silla	E. W. Elst	·	2.7 km	MPC · JPL
49180	1998 SE_{67}	—	September 20, 1998	La Silla	E. W. Elst	·	4.8 km	MPC · JPL
49181	1998 SU_{67}	—	September 20, 1998	La Silla	E. W. Elst	·	5.7 km	MPC · JPL
49182	1998 SP_{69}	—	September 19, 1998	Socorro	LINEAR	·	3.8 km	MPC · JPL
49183	1998 SW_{72}	—	September 21, 1998	La Silla	E. W. Elst	·	3.9 km	MPC · JPL
49184	1998 SW_{73}	—	September 21, 1998	La Silla	E. W. Elst	·	3.9 km	MPC · JPL
49185	1998 SA_{74}	—	September 21, 1998	La Silla	E. W. Elst	·	3.9 km	MPC · JPL
49186	1998 SS_{75}	—	September 20, 1998	Xinglong	SCAP	(6769)	3.4 km	MPC · JPL
49187 Zucchini	1998 SY_{75}	Zucchini	September 18, 1998	Bologna	San Vittore	·	1.5 km	MPC · JPL
49188	1998 SZ_{79}	—	September 26, 1998	Socorro	LINEAR	NYS ·	2.7 km	MPC · JPL
49189	1998 SJ_{80}	—	September 26, 1998	Socorro	LINEAR	·	4.8 km	MPC · JPL
49190	1998 SL_{81}	—	September 26, 1998	Socorro	LINEAR	MAS	2.0 km	MPC · JPL
49191	1998 SN_{85}	—	September 26, 1998	Socorro	LINEAR	·	3.1 km	MPC · JPL
49192	1998 SU_{89}	—	September 26, 1998	Socorro	LINEAR	·	1.9 km	MPC · JPL
49193	1998 SM_{91}	—	September 26, 1998	Socorro	LINEAR	·	2.3 km	MPC · JPL
49194	1998 SX_{95}	—	September 26, 1998	Socorro	LINEAR	·	2.7 km	MPC · JPL
49195	1998 SG_{102}	—	September 26, 1998	Socorro	LINEAR	·	3.8 km	MPC · JPL
49196	1998 SU_{103}	—	September 26, 1998	Socorro	LINEAR	·	4.3 km	MPC · JPL
49197	1998 SC_{104}	—	September 26, 1998	Socorro	LINEAR	·	3.2 km	MPC · JPL
49198	1998 SG_{107}	—	September 26, 1998	Socorro	LINEAR	·	2.5 km	MPC · JPL
49199	1998 SQ_{107}	—	September 26, 1998	Socorro	LINEAR	·	8.2 km	MPC · JPL
49200	1998 SW_{107}	—	September 26, 1998	Socorro	LINEAR	·	2.2 km	MPC · JPL

== 49201–49300 ==
back to top

Designation			Discovery			Properties		Ref
Permanent	Provisional	Named after	Date	Site	Discoverer(s)	Category	Diam.	Ref
49201	1998 SH_{110}	—	September 26, 1998	Socorro	LINEAR	·	2.9 km	MPC · JPL
49202	1998 SE_{111}	—	September 26, 1998	Socorro	LINEAR	NYS	2.4 km	MPC · JPL
49203	1998 SW_{115}	—	September 26, 1998	Socorro	LINEAR	NYS	3.6 km	MPC · JPL
49204	1998 SR_{116}	—	September 26, 1998	Socorro	LINEAR	·	4.1 km	MPC · JPL
49205	1998 SZ_{117}	—	September 26, 1998	Socorro	LINEAR	·	7.4 km	MPC · JPL
49206	1998 SR_{118}	—	September 26, 1998	Socorro	LINEAR	·	3.2 km	MPC · JPL
49207	1998 SV_{118}	—	September 26, 1998	Socorro	LINEAR	·	1.9 km	MPC · JPL
49208	1998 SB_{119}	—	September 26, 1998	Socorro	LINEAR	NYS	3.7 km	MPC · JPL
49209	1998 SN_{119}	—	September 26, 1998	Socorro	LINEAR	NYS	2.4 km	MPC · JPL
49210	1998 ST_{119}	—	September 26, 1998	Socorro	LINEAR	(5)	3.9 km	MPC · JPL
49211	1998 SX_{119}	—	September 26, 1998	Socorro	LINEAR	·	5.1 km	MPC · JPL
49212	1998 SM_{121}	—	September 26, 1998	Socorro	LINEAR	·	2.3 km	MPC · JPL
49213	1998 SW_{122}	—	September 26, 1998	Socorro	LINEAR	NYS	3.3 km	MPC · JPL
49214	1998 SJ_{123}	—	September 26, 1998	Socorro	LINEAR	·	3.1 km	MPC · JPL
49215	1998 SE_{124}	—	September 26, 1998	Socorro	LINEAR	V	1.4 km	MPC · JPL
49216	1998 SH_{124}	—	September 26, 1998	Socorro	LINEAR	·	2.6 km	MPC · JPL
49217	1998 SJ_{124}	—	September 26, 1998	Socorro	LINEAR	·	3.1 km	MPC · JPL
49218	1998 SQ_{124}	—	September 26, 1998	Socorro	LINEAR	·	3.1 km	MPC · JPL
49219	1998 SR_{124}	—	September 26, 1998	Socorro	LINEAR	·	4.3 km	MPC · JPL
49220	1998 SA_{129}	—	September 26, 1998	Socorro	LINEAR	·	5.5 km	MPC · JPL
49221	1998 SR_{129}	—	September 26, 1998	Socorro	LINEAR	·	3.4 km	MPC · JPL
49222	1998 SM_{135}	—	September 26, 1998	Socorro	LINEAR	NYS	2.7 km	MPC · JPL
49223	1998 SA_{136}	—	September 26, 1998	Socorro	LINEAR	·	3.4 km	MPC · JPL
49224	1998 SK_{136}	—	September 26, 1998	Socorro	LINEAR	(5)	3.2 km	MPC · JPL
49225	1998 SV_{136}	—	September 26, 1998	Socorro	LINEAR	·	6.4 km	MPC · JPL
49226	1998 SX_{136}	—	September 26, 1998	Socorro	LINEAR	·	2.2 km	MPC · JPL
49227	1998 SC_{137}	—	September 26, 1998	Socorro	LINEAR	MAR	4.8 km	MPC · JPL
49228	1998 SK_{137}	—	September 26, 1998	Socorro	LINEAR	·	6.8 km	MPC · JPL
49229	1998 SB_{140}	—	September 26, 1998	Socorro	LINEAR	V	2.4 km	MPC · JPL
49230	1998 SL_{140}	—	September 26, 1998	Socorro	LINEAR	·	1.8 km	MPC · JPL
49231	1998 ST_{140}	—	September 26, 1998	Socorro	LINEAR	NYS	2.8 km	MPC · JPL
49232	1998 SB_{143}	—	September 26, 1998	Socorro	LINEAR	V	1.9 km	MPC · JPL
49233	1998 SE_{145}	—	September 20, 1998	La Silla	E. W. Elst	(5)	1.8 km	MPC · JPL
49234	1998 SL_{146}	—	September 20, 1998	La Silla	E. W. Elst	·	3.4 km	MPC · JPL
49235	1998 SZ_{146}	—	September 20, 1998	La Silla	E. W. Elst	·	5.6 km	MPC · JPL
49236	1998 SK_{151}	—	September 26, 1998	Socorro	LINEAR	NYS	2.6 km	MPC · JPL
49237	1998 SW_{153}	—	September 26, 1998	Socorro	LINEAR	·	3.2 km	MPC · JPL
49238	1998 SE_{157}	—	September 26, 1998	Socorro	LINEAR	·	2.7 km	MPC · JPL
49239	1998 SE_{164}	—	September 18, 1998	La Silla	E. W. Elst	·	8.4 km	MPC · JPL
49240	1998 SF_{164}	—	September 18, 1998	La Silla	E. W. Elst	·	3.5 km	MPC · JPL
49241	1998 TQ_{3}	—	October 14, 1998	Socorro	LINEAR	PHO · slow	7.1 km	MPC · JPL
49242	1998 TD_{5}	—	October 13, 1998	Višnjan Observatory	K. Korlević	·	4.7 km	MPC · JPL
49243	1998 TE_{5}	—	October 13, 1998	Višnjan Observatory	K. Korlević	·	3.8 km	MPC · JPL
49244	1998 TG_{5}	—	October 13, 1998	Višnjan Observatory	K. Korlević	·	3.7 km	MPC · JPL
49245	1998 TS_{5}	—	October 13, 1998	Višnjan Observatory	K. Korlević	EUN	4.0 km	MPC · JPL
49246	1998 TF_{6}	—	October 15, 1998	Višnjan Observatory	K. Korlević	·	7.1 km	MPC · JPL
49247	1998 TL_{6}	—	October 13, 1998	Ondřejov	L. Kotková	·	2.6 km	MPC · JPL
49248	1998 TX_{7}	—	October 13, 1998	Kitt Peak	Spacewatch	MAS	1.8 km	MPC · JPL
49249	1998 TV_{13}	—	October 13, 1998	Kitt Peak	Spacewatch	·	2.2 km	MPC · JPL
49250	1998 TD_{15}	—	October 14, 1998	Kitt Peak	Spacewatch	·	2.9 km	MPC · JPL
49251	1998 TR_{17}	—	October 15, 1998	Višnjan Observatory	K. Korlević	·	3.0 km	MPC · JPL
49252	1998 TZ_{18}	—	October 14, 1998	Xinglong	SCAP	·	2.0 km	MPC · JPL
49253	1998 TF_{21}	—	October 13, 1998	Kitt Peak	Spacewatch	·	6.2 km	MPC · JPL
49254	1998 TQ_{25}	—	October 14, 1998	Kitt Peak	Spacewatch	·	3.3 km	MPC · JPL
49255	1998 TJ_{29}	—	October 15, 1998	Kitt Peak	Spacewatch	NYS	2.6 km	MPC · JPL
49256	1998 TA_{31}	—	October 10, 1998	Anderson Mesa	LONEOS	(5)	5.5 km	MPC · JPL
49257	1998 TJ_{31}	—	October 10, 1998	Anderson Mesa	LONEOS	·	3.1 km	MPC · JPL
49258	1998 TM_{32}	—	October 11, 1998	Anderson Mesa	LONEOS	·	4.7 km	MPC · JPL
49259	1998 TF_{33}	—	October 14, 1998	Anderson Mesa	LONEOS	·	2.6 km	MPC · JPL
49260	1998 TU_{33}	—	October 14, 1998	Anderson Mesa	LONEOS	(5)	2.0 km	MPC · JPL
49261	1998 TW_{33}	—	October 14, 1998	Anderson Mesa	LONEOS	·	3.3 km	MPC · JPL
49262	1998 TY_{34}	—	October 14, 1998	Anderson Mesa	LONEOS	NYS	3.8 km	MPC · JPL
49263	1998 TJ_{36}	—	October 11, 1998	Anderson Mesa	LONEOS	fast	4.1 km	MPC · JPL
49264	1998 UC	—	October 16, 1998	Catalina	CSS	·	4.9 km	MPC · JPL
49265 Raphaeljimenez	1998 UM_{3}	Raphaeljimenez	October 20, 1998	Caussols	ODAS	·	1.7 km	MPC · JPL
49266	1998 UW_{5}	—	October 22, 1998	Caussols	ODAS	·	2.3 km	MPC · JPL
49267	1998 UU_{6}	—	October 18, 1998	Gekko	T. Kagawa	EUN	4.9 km	MPC · JPL
49268	1998 UV_{7}	—	October 23, 1998	Višnjan Observatory	K. Korlević	EUN	3.4 km	MPC · JPL
49269	1998 UW_{7}	—	October 23, 1998	Višnjan Observatory	K. Korlević	·	3.4 km	MPC · JPL
49270	1998 UB_{9}	—	October 17, 1998	Xinglong	SCAP	·	3.6 km	MPC · JPL
49271	1998 UG_{15}	—	October 20, 1998	Woomera	F. B. Zoltowski	V	4.3 km	MPC · JPL
49272 Bryce Canyon	1998 UT_{16}	Bryce Canyon	October 27, 1998	Goodricke-Pigott	R. A. Tucker	·	5.1 km	MPC · JPL
49273	1998 UY_{18}	—	October 27, 1998	Višnjan Observatory	K. Korlević	(5)	2.5 km	MPC · JPL
49274	1998 UB_{20}	—	October 28, 1998	Višnjan Observatory	K. Korlević	·	3.8 km	MPC · JPL
49275	1998 UO_{20}	—	October 28, 1998	Višnjan Observatory	K. Korlević	EUN	3.5 km	MPC · JPL
49276	1998 UA_{21}	—	October 29, 1998	Višnjan Observatory	K. Korlević	·	2.5 km	MPC · JPL
49277	1998 UK_{22}	—	October 28, 1998	Socorro	LINEAR	slow	5.5 km	MPC · JPL
49278	1998 UO_{22}	—	October 28, 1998	Socorro	LINEAR	KOR	3.4 km	MPC · JPL
49279	1998 UP_{22}	—	October 28, 1998	Socorro	LINEAR	·	3.2 km	MPC · JPL
49280	1998 UT_{22}	—	October 28, 1998	Reedy Creek	J. Broughton	·	3.6 km	MPC · JPL
49281	1998 UX_{22}	—	October 30, 1998	Višnjan Observatory	K. Korlević	(5)	3.4 km	MPC · JPL
49282	1998 UA_{24}	—	October 17, 1998	Anderson Mesa	LONEOS	·	2.5 km	MPC · JPL
49283	1998 UG_{29}	—	October 18, 1998	La Silla	E. W. Elst	·	4.8 km	MPC · JPL
49284	1998 US_{29}	—	October 18, 1998	La Silla	E. W. Elst	·	3.5 km	MPC · JPL
49285	1998 UT_{29}	—	October 18, 1998	La Silla	E. W. Elst	·	3.4 km	MPC · JPL
49286	1998 UC_{30}	—	October 18, 1998	La Silla	E. W. Elst	·	6.2 km	MPC · JPL
49287	1998 US_{31}	—	October 22, 1998	Xinglong	SCAP	·	5.6 km	MPC · JPL
49288	1998 UD_{33}	—	October 28, 1998	Socorro	LINEAR	·	2.3 km	MPC · JPL
49289	1998 UH_{40}	—	October 28, 1998	Socorro	LINEAR	·	2.9 km	MPC · JPL
49290	1998 UV_{41}	—	October 28, 1998	Socorro	LINEAR	·	4.2 km	MPC · JPL
49291 Thechills	1998 VJ	Thechills	November 8, 1998	Cocoa	I. P. Griffin	·	5.6 km	MPC · JPL
49292	1998 VA_{1}	—	November 10, 1998	Socorro	LINEAR	EUN	2.8 km	MPC · JPL
49293	1998 VK_{1}	—	November 10, 1998	Socorro	LINEAR	EUN	3.0 km	MPC · JPL
49294 Jacqclairnoëns	1998 VG_{2}	Jacqclairnoëns	November 10, 1998	Caussols	ODAS	·	1.6 km	MPC · JPL
49295	1998 VJ_{2}	—	November 10, 1998	Caussols	ODAS	·	2.8 km	MPC · JPL
49296 Lucdettwiller	1998 VD_{3}	Lucdettwiller	November 10, 1998	Caussols	ODAS	EUN	2.6 km	MPC · JPL
49297	1998 VY_{4}	—	November 11, 1998	Zeno	T. Stafford	·	4.0 km	MPC · JPL
49298	1998 VS_{5}	—	November 2, 1998	Fair Oaks Ranch	J. V. McClusky	HNS	2.8 km	MPC · JPL
49299	1998 VU_{5}	—	November 11, 1998	Gekko	T. Kagawa	·	3.9 km	MPC · JPL
49300	1998 VZ_{5}	—	November 13, 1998	Farpoint	G. Hug, G. Bell	·	2.5 km	MPC · JPL

== 49301–49400 ==
back to top

Designation			Discovery			Properties		Ref
Permanent	Provisional	Named after	Date	Site	Discoverer(s)	Category	Diam.	Ref
49301	1998 VD_{6}	—	November 11, 1998	Gekko	T. Kagawa	·	3.9 km	MPC · JPL
49302	1998 VW_{7}	—	November 10, 1998	Socorro	LINEAR	·	4.0 km	MPC · JPL
49303	1998 VN_{9}	—	November 10, 1998	Socorro	LINEAR	EUN	3.7 km	MPC · JPL
49304	1998 VT_{9}	—	November 10, 1998	Socorro	LINEAR	·	3.6 km	MPC · JPL
49305	1998 VQ_{13}	—	November 10, 1998	Socorro	LINEAR	·	4.1 km	MPC · JPL
49306	1998 VS_{13}	—	November 10, 1998	Socorro	LINEAR	·	3.8 km	MPC · JPL
49307	1998 VJ_{15}	—	November 10, 1998	Socorro	LINEAR	·	5.2 km	MPC · JPL
49308	1998 VV_{15}	—	November 10, 1998	Socorro	LINEAR	·	3.6 km	MPC · JPL
49309	1998 VB_{16}	—	November 10, 1998	Socorro	LINEAR	NYS	4.7 km	MPC · JPL
49310	1998 VD_{17}	—	November 10, 1998	Socorro	LINEAR	HNS	3.6 km	MPC · JPL
49311	1998 VZ_{17}	—	November 10, 1998	Socorro	LINEAR	·	2.3 km	MPC · JPL
49312	1998 VA_{18}	—	November 10, 1998	Socorro	LINEAR	·	4.2 km	MPC · JPL
49313	1998 VM_{18}	—	November 10, 1998	Socorro	LINEAR	PHO	9.9 km	MPC · JPL
49314	1998 VN_{19}	—	November 10, 1998	Socorro	LINEAR	·	3.8 km	MPC · JPL
49315	1998 VP_{21}	—	November 10, 1998	Socorro	LINEAR	(5)	2.4 km	MPC · JPL
49316	1998 VX_{23}	—	November 10, 1998	Socorro	LINEAR	·	7.4 km	MPC · JPL
49317	1998 VN_{24}	—	November 10, 1998	Socorro	LINEAR	EUN	5.6 km	MPC · JPL
49318	1998 VE_{25}	—	November 10, 1998	Socorro	LINEAR	·	2.4 km	MPC · JPL
49319	1998 VT_{25}	—	November 10, 1998	Socorro	LINEAR	·	5.1 km	MPC · JPL
49320	1998 VJ_{26}	—	November 10, 1998	Socorro	LINEAR	NYS	4.1 km	MPC · JPL
49321	1998 VY_{28}	—	November 10, 1998	Socorro	LINEAR	·	2.0 km	MPC · JPL
49322	1998 VN_{29}	—	November 10, 1998	Socorro	LINEAR	·	3.7 km	MPC · JPL
49323	1998 VN_{30}	—	November 10, 1998	Socorro	LINEAR	·	2.6 km	MPC · JPL
49324	1998 VX_{30}	—	November 10, 1998	Socorro	LINEAR	·	3.3 km	MPC · JPL
49325	1998 VK_{31}	—	November 14, 1998	Oizumi	T. Kobayashi	·	5.4 km	MPC · JPL
49326	1998 VL_{31}	—	November 14, 1998	Oizumi	T. Kobayashi	EUN	4.4 km	MPC · JPL
49327	1998 VZ_{33}	—	November 11, 1998	Farra d'Isonzo	Farra d'Isonzo	·	3.1 km	MPC · JPL
49328	1998 VL_{35}	—	November 1, 1998	Xinglong	SCAP	·	3.5 km	MPC · JPL
49329	1998 VQ_{35}	—	November 9, 1998	Xinglong	SCAP	·	5.6 km	MPC · JPL
49330	1998 VE_{36}	—	November 14, 1998	Socorro	LINEAR	·	2.9 km	MPC · JPL
49331	1998 VZ_{37}	—	November 10, 1998	Socorro	LINEAR	EUN	3.7 km	MPC · JPL
49332	1998 VC_{44}	—	November 15, 1998	Višnjan Observatory	K. Korlević	·	5.3 km	MPC · JPL
49333	1998 VP_{45}	—	November 11, 1998	Anderson Mesa	LONEOS	·	3.3 km	MPC · JPL
49334	1998 VU_{45}	—	November 14, 1998	Anderson Mesa	LONEOS	·	2.9 km	MPC · JPL
49335	1998 VV_{45}	—	November 14, 1998	Anderson Mesa	LONEOS	·	5.6 km	MPC · JPL
49336	1998 VC_{49}	—	November 10, 1998	Socorro	LINEAR	HNS	2.9 km	MPC · JPL
49337	1998 VN_{50}	—	November 11, 1998	Socorro	LINEAR	MAR	2.3 km	MPC · JPL
49338	1998 VR_{51}	—	November 13, 1998	Socorro	LINEAR	EUN	4.2 km	MPC · JPL
49339	1998 VH_{54}	—	November 14, 1998	Socorro	LINEAR	·	4.8 km	MPC · JPL
49340	1998 WG	—	November 16, 1998	San Marcello	A. Boattini, L. Tesi	·	2.1 km	MPC · JPL
49341	1998 WW_{2}	—	November 17, 1998	Caussols	ODAS	·	4.5 km	MPC · JPL
49342	1998 WE_{3}	—	November 18, 1998	Gekko	T. Kagawa	PAD	6.5 km	MPC · JPL
49343	1998 WH_{3}	—	November 19, 1998	Oizumi	T. Kobayashi	EUN	3.0 km	MPC · JPL
49344	1998 WC_{4}	—	November 20, 1998	Farra d'Isonzo	Farra d'Isonzo	·	4.6 km	MPC · JPL
49345	1998 WH_{4}	—	November 18, 1998	Kushiro	S. Ueda, H. Kaneda	·	7.1 km	MPC · JPL
49346	1998 WK_{4}	—	November 21, 1998	Prescott	P. G. Comba	·	4.1 km	MPC · JPL
49347	1998 WQ_{4}	—	November 18, 1998	Catalina	CSS	·	3.5 km	MPC · JPL
49348	1998 WO_{6}	—	November 23, 1998	Oizumi	T. Kobayashi	·	6.2 km	MPC · JPL
49349	1998 WW_{6}	—	November 24, 1998	Baton Rouge	W. R. Cooney Jr., P. M. Motl	·	3.8 km	MPC · JPL
49350 Katheynix	1998 WQ_{8}	Katheynix	November 27, 1998	Baton Rouge	W. R. Cooney Jr.	·	4.8 km	MPC · JPL
49351	1998 WE_{9}	—	November 27, 1998	Višnjan Observatory	K. Korlević	EOS	8.2 km	MPC · JPL
49352	1998 WS_{9}	—	November 28, 1998	Višnjan Observatory	K. Korlević	·	3.9 km	MPC · JPL
49353	1998 WY_{9}	—	November 18, 1998	Socorro	LINEAR	·	3.1 km	MPC · JPL
49354	1998 WP_{11}	—	November 21, 1998	Socorro	LINEAR	EUN	3.6 km	MPC · JPL
49355	1998 WH_{12}	—	November 21, 1998	Socorro	LINEAR	NYS	3.5 km	MPC · JPL
49356	1998 WT_{13}	—	November 21, 1998	Socorro	LINEAR	·	4.9 km	MPC · JPL
49357	1998 WG_{14}	—	November 21, 1998	Socorro	LINEAR	MAR	3.5 km	MPC · JPL
49358	1998 WZ_{14}	—	November 21, 1998	Socorro	LINEAR	NYS	5.3 km	MPC · JPL
49359	1998 WB_{15}	—	November 21, 1998	Socorro	LINEAR	·	4.8 km	MPC · JPL
49360	1998 WM_{15}	—	November 21, 1998	Socorro	LINEAR	·	4.4 km	MPC · JPL
49361	1998 WN_{15}	—	November 21, 1998	Socorro	LINEAR	·	4.7 km	MPC · JPL
49362	1998 WW_{16}	—	November 21, 1998	Socorro	LINEAR	·	5.5 km	MPC · JPL
49363	1998 WZ_{16}	—	November 21, 1998	Socorro	LINEAR	·	5.7 km	MPC · JPL
49364	1998 WG_{17}	—	November 21, 1998	Socorro	LINEAR	·	3.8 km	MPC · JPL
49365	1998 WR_{18}	—	November 21, 1998	Socorro	LINEAR	·	4.5 km	MPC · JPL
49366	1998 WY_{18}	—	November 21, 1998	Socorro	LINEAR	·	4.1 km	MPC · JPL
49367	1998 WK_{19}	—	November 23, 1998	Socorro	LINEAR	EUN	5.5 km	MPC · JPL
49368	1998 WN_{19}	—	November 23, 1998	Socorro	LINEAR	·	8.3 km	MPC · JPL
49369	1998 WO_{19}	—	November 23, 1998	Socorro	LINEAR	·	3.4 km	MPC · JPL
49370	1998 WS_{21}	—	November 18, 1998	Socorro	LINEAR	·	3.8 km	MPC · JPL
49371	1998 WZ_{21}	—	November 18, 1998	Socorro	LINEAR	·	3.3 km	MPC · JPL
49372	1998 WL_{30}	—	November 26, 1998	Kitt Peak	Spacewatch	EUN	3.2 km	MPC · JPL
49373	1998 WO_{35}	—	November 18, 1998	Kitt Peak	Spacewatch	·	3.7 km	MPC · JPL
49374	1998 WD_{36}	—	November 19, 1998	Kitt Peak	Spacewatch	·	3.6 km	MPC · JPL
49375	1998 WW_{36}	—	November 21, 1998	Kitt Peak	Spacewatch	(5)	2.3 km	MPC · JPL
49376	1998 WB_{41}	—	November 18, 1998	Socorro	LINEAR	·	3.2 km	MPC · JPL
49377	1998 WP_{41}	—	November 24, 1998	Socorro	LINEAR	·	5.2 km	MPC · JPL
49378	1998 XU_{2}	—	December 7, 1998	Xinglong	SCAP	EUN	6.2 km	MPC · JPL
49379	1998 XF_{3}	—	December 8, 1998	Xinglong	SCAP	·	3.8 km	MPC · JPL
49380	1998 XU_{4}	—	December 12, 1998	Oizumi	T. Kobayashi	KOR	3.6 km	MPC · JPL
49381	1998 XX_{4}	—	December 12, 1998	Oizumi	T. Kobayashi	·	7.7 km	MPC · JPL
49382 Lynnokamoto	1998 XG_{5}	Lynnokamoto	December 12, 1998	Goodricke-Pigott	R. A. Tucker	ADE	6.7 km	MPC · JPL
49383	1998 XP_{6}	—	December 8, 1998	Kitt Peak	Spacewatch	·	2.8 km	MPC · JPL
49384 Hubertnaudot	1998 XX_{9}	Hubertnaudot	December 12, 1998	Blauvac	R. Roy	·	3.6 km	MPC · JPL
49385	1998 XA_{12}	—	December 14, 1998	Socorro	LINEAR	·	7.7 km	MPC · JPL
49386	1998 XH_{12}	—	December 4, 1998	Xinglong	SCAP	·	4.5 km	MPC · JPL
49387	1998 XH_{16}	—	December 14, 1998	Socorro	LINEAR	·	5.5 km	MPC · JPL
49388	1998 XR_{20}	—	December 10, 1998	Kitt Peak	Spacewatch	KOR	3.9 km	MPC · JPL
49389	1998 XS_{20}	—	December 10, 1998	Kitt Peak	Spacewatch	·	6.6 km	MPC · JPL
49390	1998 XO_{21}	—	December 10, 1998	Kitt Peak	Spacewatch	·	5.2 km	MPC · JPL
49391	1998 XH_{25}	—	December 13, 1998	Kitt Peak	Spacewatch	·	3.1 km	MPC · JPL
49392	1998 XD_{26}	—	December 15, 1998	Xinglong	SCAP	·	5.3 km	MPC · JPL
49393	1998 XC_{28}	—	December 14, 1998	Socorro	LINEAR	EUN	3.9 km	MPC · JPL
49394	1998 XT_{29}	—	December 14, 1998	Socorro	LINEAR	HNS	3.1 km	MPC · JPL
49395	1998 XW_{32}	—	December 14, 1998	Socorro	LINEAR	EUN	3.6 km	MPC · JPL
49396	1998 XG_{40}	—	December 14, 1998	Socorro	LINEAR	·	6.0 km	MPC · JPL
49397	1998 XU_{40}	—	December 14, 1998	Socorro	LINEAR	·	4.4 km	MPC · JPL
49398	1998 XO_{41}	—	December 14, 1998	Socorro	LINEAR	DOR	6.9 km	MPC · JPL
49399	1998 XK_{44}	—	December 14, 1998	Socorro	LINEAR	·	4.6 km	MPC · JPL
49400	1998 XS_{44}	—	December 14, 1998	Socorro	LINEAR	EUN	3.8 km	MPC · JPL

== 49401–49500 ==
back to top

Designation			Discovery			Properties		Ref
Permanent	Provisional	Named after	Date	Site	Discoverer(s)	Category	Diam.	Ref
49401	1998 XT_{44}	—	December 14, 1998	Socorro	LINEAR	ADE	6.1 km	MPC · JPL
49402	1998 XZ_{44}	—	December 14, 1998	Socorro	LINEAR	·	7.4 km	MPC · JPL
49403	1998 XE_{45}	—	December 14, 1998	Socorro	LINEAR	EUN	4.7 km	MPC · JPL
49404	1998 XN_{45}	—	December 14, 1998	Socorro	LINEAR	·	5.3 km	MPC · JPL
49405	1998 XW_{46}	—	December 14, 1998	Socorro	LINEAR	(5)	2.5 km	MPC · JPL
49406	1998 XP_{47}	—	December 14, 1998	Socorro	LINEAR	·	5.0 km	MPC · JPL
49407	1998 XC_{50}	—	December 14, 1998	Socorro	LINEAR	·	4.1 km	MPC · JPL
49408	1998 XL_{50}	—	December 14, 1998	Socorro	LINEAR	·	4.3 km	MPC · JPL
49409	1998 XS_{50}	—	December 14, 1998	Socorro	LINEAR	EOS	5.2 km	MPC · JPL
49410	1998 XR_{51}	—	December 14, 1998	Socorro	LINEAR	·	4.3 km	MPC · JPL
49411	1998 XT_{51}	—	December 14, 1998	Socorro	LINEAR	·	11 km	MPC · JPL
49412	1998 XV_{55}	—	December 15, 1998	Socorro	LINEAR	·	5.5 km	MPC · JPL
49413	1998 XZ_{62}	—	December 14, 1998	Socorro	LINEAR	·	7.3 km	MPC · JPL
49414	1998 XT_{65}	—	December 14, 1998	Socorro	LINEAR	(5)	3.1 km	MPC · JPL
49415	1998 XE_{68}	—	December 14, 1998	Socorro	LINEAR	GEF	3.3 km	MPC · JPL
49416	1998 XG_{73}	—	December 14, 1998	Socorro	LINEAR	EUN	3.8 km	MPC · JPL
49417	1998 XM_{73}	—	December 14, 1998	Socorro	LINEAR	·	5.5 km	MPC · JPL
49418	1998 XP_{73}	—	December 14, 1998	Socorro	LINEAR	RAF	4.1 km	MPC · JPL
49419	1998 XJ_{74}	—	December 14, 1998	Socorro	LINEAR	EUN	3.5 km	MPC · JPL
49420	1998 XK_{74}	—	December 14, 1998	Socorro	LINEAR	·	6.6 km	MPC · JPL
49421	1998 XC_{77}	—	December 15, 1998	Socorro	LINEAR	AGN	4.4 km	MPC · JPL
49422	1998 XM_{77}	—	December 15, 1998	Socorro	LINEAR	·	4.3 km	MPC · JPL
49423	1998 XR_{77}	—	December 15, 1998	Socorro	LINEAR	(5)	2.9 km	MPC · JPL
49424	1998 XC_{80}	—	December 15, 1998	Socorro	LINEAR	DOR	9.0 km	MPC · JPL
49425	1998 XE_{80}	—	December 15, 1998	Socorro	LINEAR	ADE	6.1 km	MPC · JPL
49426	1998 XP_{80}	—	December 15, 1998	Socorro	LINEAR	·	4.3 km	MPC · JPL
49427	1998 XE_{86}	—	December 15, 1998	Socorro	LINEAR	EUN	3.9 km	MPC · JPL
49428	1998 XL_{94}	—	December 15, 1998	Socorro	LINEAR	CLO	8.6 km	MPC · JPL
49429	1998 XZ_{95}	—	December 2, 1998	Xinglong	SCAP	·	2.1 km	MPC · JPL
49430	1998 XZ_{96}	—	December 11, 1998	Mérida	Naranjo, O. A.	·	4.0 km	MPC · JPL
49431	1998 XB_{99}	—	December 15, 1998	Socorro	LINEAR	·	6.7 km	MPC · JPL
49432	1998 YD	—	December 16, 1998	Višnjan Observatory	K. Korlević	HNS	4.7 km	MPC · JPL
49433	1998 YS	—	December 16, 1998	Oizumi	T. Kobayashi	·	7.2 km	MPC · JPL
49434	1998 YB_{1}	—	December 16, 1998	Gekko	T. Kagawa	·	5.9 km	MPC · JPL
49435	1998 YH_{1}	—	December 16, 1998	Gekko	T. Kagawa	·	6.1 km	MPC · JPL
49436	1998 YX_{2}	—	December 17, 1998	Ondřejov	P. Pravec, U. Babiaková	·	2.8 km	MPC · JPL
49437	1998 YY_{3}	—	December 17, 1998	Gekko	T. Kagawa	·	2.5 km	MPC · JPL
49438	1998 YD_{4}	—	December 19, 1998	Oizumi	T. Kobayashi	·	5.0 km	MPC · JPL
49439 Jeanlouispala	1998 YC_{5}	Jeanlouispala	December 17, 1998	Caussols	ODAS	EOS	4.8 km	MPC · JPL
49440 Kenzotange	1998 YP_{5}	Kenzotange	December 21, 1998	Kuma Kogen	A. Nakamura	·	7.0 km	MPC · JPL
49441 Scerbanenco	1998 YM_{6}	Scerbanenco	December 22, 1998	Bologna	San Vittore	(5)	2.4 km	MPC · JPL
49442 Kubokoichi	1998 YD_{7}	Kubokoichi	December 20, 1998	Uto	F. Uto	·	7.5 km	MPC · JPL
49443 Marcobondi	1998 YN_{7}	Marcobondi	December 22, 1998	Montelupo	D. Guidetti, Masotti, E.	·	6.3 km	MPC · JPL
49444	1998 YO_{7}	—	December 22, 1998	Gekko	T. Kagawa	·	3.5 km	MPC · JPL
49445	1998 YS_{8}	—	December 17, 1998	Xinglong	SCAP	·	3.1 km	MPC · JPL
49446	1998 YO_{9}	—	December 25, 1998	Višnjan Observatory	K. Korlević, M. Jurić	·	4.1 km	MPC · JPL
49447	1998 YW_{11}	—	December 26, 1998	Oizumi	T. Kobayashi	·	9.5 km	MPC · JPL
49448 Macocha	1998 YJ_{12}	Macocha	December 21, 1998	Ondřejov	P. Pravec	·	3.8 km	MPC · JPL
49449	1998 YN_{13}	—	December 17, 1998	Kitt Peak	Spacewatch	GEF	3.1 km	MPC · JPL
49450	1998 YD_{14}	—	December 19, 1998	Kitt Peak	Spacewatch	·	7.0 km	MPC · JPL
49451	1998 YH_{18}	—	December 25, 1998	Kitt Peak	Spacewatch	·	2.4 km	MPC · JPL
49452	1998 YV_{18}	—	December 25, 1998	Kitt Peak	Spacewatch	AGN	2.9 km	MPC · JPL
49453	1998 YD_{19}	—	December 25, 1998	Kitt Peak	Spacewatch	·	4.8 km	MPC · JPL
49454	1998 YH_{22}	—	December 30, 1998	Baton Rouge	W. R. Cooney Jr., Martin, T.	·	1.7 km	MPC · JPL
49455	1998 YO_{22}	—	December 29, 1998	Xinglong	SCAP	·	6.6 km	MPC · JPL
49456	1998 YD_{28}	—	December 21, 1998	Socorro	LINEAR	·	4.0 km	MPC · JPL
49457	1998 YC_{30}	—	December 19, 1998	Xinglong	SCAP	EUN	3.2 km	MPC · JPL
49458	1999 AH_{2}	—	January 9, 1999	Oizumi	T. Kobayashi	(5)	3.3 km	MPC · JPL
49459	1999 AJ_{2}	—	January 9, 1999	Oizumi	T. Kobayashi	·	8.0 km	MPC · JPL
49460	1999 AT_{4}	—	January 11, 1999	Oizumi	T. Kobayashi	·	6.3 km	MPC · JPL
49461	1999 AK_{5}	—	January 10, 1999	Nachi-Katsuura	Y. Shimizu, T. Urata	EOS	8.5 km	MPC · JPL
49462	1999 AS_{6}	—	January 9, 1999	Višnjan Observatory	K. Korlević	·	5.9 km	MPC · JPL
49463	1999 AZ_{6}	—	January 9, 1999	Višnjan Observatory	K. Korlević	EOS	9.1 km	MPC · JPL
49464	1999 AO_{7}	—	January 11, 1999	Višnjan Observatory	K. Korlević	EOS	5.9 km	MPC · JPL
49465	1999 AT_{8}	—	January 10, 1999	Fair Oaks Ranch	J. V. McClusky	NEM	4.0 km	MPC · JPL
49466 Huanglin	1999 AX_{8}	Huanglin	January 6, 1999	Xinglong	SCAP	GEF	4.0 km	MPC · JPL
49467	1999 AC_{16}	—	January 9, 1999	Kitt Peak	Spacewatch	·	5.8 km	MPC · JPL
49468	1999 AE_{24}	—	January 15, 1999	Oizumi	T. Kobayashi	·	7.9 km	MPC · JPL
49469 Emilianomazzoni	1999 AL_{25}	Emilianomazzoni	January 15, 1999	Monte Agliale	S. Donati	·	8.6 km	MPC · JPL
49470	1999 AZ_{26}	—	January 9, 1999	Kitt Peak	Spacewatch	·	9.4 km	MPC · JPL
49471	1999 AX_{27}	—	January 11, 1999	Kitt Peak	Spacewatch	NAE	6.5 km	MPC · JPL
49472	1999 AR_{30}	—	January 14, 1999	Kitt Peak	Spacewatch	·	6.4 km	MPC · JPL
49473	1999 AT_{32}	—	January 15, 1999	Kitt Peak	Spacewatch	·	5.1 km	MPC · JPL
49474	1999 BL	—	January 16, 1999	Oizumi	T. Kobayashi	·	9.0 km	MPC · JPL
49475	1999 BH_{3}	—	January 19, 1999	Črni Vrh	Črni Vrh	·	6.0 km	MPC · JPL
49476	1999 BA_{6}	—	January 21, 1999	Višnjan Observatory	K. Korlević	V	2.2 km	MPC · JPL
49477	1999 BA_{8}	—	January 21, 1999	Višnjan Observatory	K. Korlević	NYS	2.9 km	MPC · JPL
49478	1999 BY_{8}	—	January 22, 1999	Višnjan Observatory	K. Korlević	·	7.5 km	MPC · JPL
49479	1999 BH_{9}	—	January 22, 1999	Višnjan Observatory	K. Korlević	·	3.4 km	MPC · JPL
49480	1999 BX_{9}	—	January 23, 1999	Višnjan Observatory	K. Korlević	·	9.0 km	MPC · JPL
49481 Gisellarubini	1999 BJ_{12}	Gisellarubini	January 24, 1999	Monte Agliale	Santangelo, M. M. M.	THM	7.0 km	MPC · JPL
49482	1999 BV_{12}	—	January 24, 1999	Višnjan Observatory	K. Korlević	·	7.3 km	MPC · JPL
49483	1999 BP_{13}	—	January 25, 1999	Višnjan Observatory	K. Korlević	·	13 km	MPC · JPL
49484	1999 BP_{15}	—	January 27, 1999	High Point	D. K. Chesney	ADE	9.6 km	MPC · JPL
49485	1999 BL_{16}	—	January 16, 1999	Socorro	LINEAR	·	5.8 km	MPC · JPL
49486	1999 BU_{18}	—	January 16, 1999	Socorro	LINEAR	·	3.2 km	MPC · JPL
49487	1999 BM_{22}	—	January 18, 1999	Socorro	LINEAR	·	3.9 km	MPC · JPL
49488	1999 BZ_{23}	—	January 18, 1999	Socorro	LINEAR	·	7.7 km	MPC · JPL
49489	1999 BQ_{24}	—	January 18, 1999	Socorro	LINEAR	·	3.9 km	MPC · JPL
49490	1999 BX_{24}	—	January 18, 1999	Socorro	LINEAR	·	8.3 km	MPC · JPL
49491	1999 BW_{25}	—	January 18, 1999	Socorro	LINEAR	·	11 km	MPC · JPL
49492	1999 BC_{26}	—	January 19, 1999	Višnjan Observatory	K. Korlević	(159)	6.2 km	MPC · JPL
49493	1999 CD	—	February 4, 1999	Oizumi	T. Kobayashi	·	2.7 km	MPC · JPL
49494	1999 CJ_{1}	—	February 6, 1999	Oizumi	T. Kobayashi	GEF	3.6 km	MPC · JPL
49495	1999 CU_{1}	—	February 7, 1999	Oizumi	T. Kobayashi	·	6.8 km	MPC · JPL
49496	1999 CC_{2}	—	February 8, 1999	Oizumi	T. Kobayashi	AGN	4.9 km	MPC · JPL
49497 Tagashiramitsuo	1999 CM_{3}	Tagashiramitsuo	February 8, 1999	Uto	F. Uto	·	9.5 km	MPC · JPL
49498	1999 CO_{5}	—	February 12, 1999	Gekko	T. Kagawa	·	6.7 km	MPC · JPL
49499	1999 CJ_{8}	—	February 13, 1999	Oizumi	T. Kobayashi	·	6.3 km	MPC · JPL
49500 Ishitoshi	1999 CP_{9}	Ishitoshi	February 14, 1999	Oizumi	T. Kobayashi	·	8.0 km	MPC · JPL

== 49501–49600 ==
back to top

Designation			Discovery			Properties		Ref
Permanent	Provisional	Named after	Date	Site	Discoverer(s)	Category	Diam.	Ref
49501 Basso	1999 CN_{10}	Basso	February 13, 1999	Ceccano	G. Masi	THM	7.6 km	MPC · JPL
49502	1999 CK_{14}	—	February 15, 1999	Višnjan Observatory	K. Korlević	EOS	7.1 km	MPC · JPL
49503	1999 CX_{16}	—	February 10, 1999	Socorro	LINEAR	EOS	7.2 km	MPC · JPL
49504	1999 CA_{17}	—	February 10, 1999	Socorro	LINEAR	·	3.0 km	MPC · JPL
49505	1999 CF_{19}	—	February 10, 1999	Socorro	LINEAR	EOS	5.9 km	MPC · JPL
49506	1999 CE_{20}	—	February 10, 1999	Socorro	LINEAR	·	4.9 km	MPC · JPL
49507	1999 CF_{20}	—	February 10, 1999	Socorro	LINEAR	EUN	3.6 km	MPC · JPL
49508	1999 CG_{22}	—	February 10, 1999	Socorro	LINEAR	·	4.2 km	MPC · JPL
49509	1999 CM_{22}	—	February 10, 1999	Socorro	LINEAR	EOS	4.7 km	MPC · JPL
49510	1999 CX_{22}	—	February 10, 1999	Socorro	LINEAR	·	3.3 km	MPC · JPL
49511	1999 CT_{25}	—	February 10, 1999	Socorro	LINEAR	·	4.4 km	MPC · JPL
49512	1999 CJ_{27}	—	February 10, 1999	Socorro	LINEAR	·	3.7 km	MPC · JPL
49513	1999 CK_{28}	—	February 10, 1999	Socorro	LINEAR	(3025)	19 km	MPC · JPL
49514	1999 CM_{31}	—	February 10, 1999	Socorro	LINEAR	·	4.1 km	MPC · JPL
49515	1999 CP_{31}	—	February 10, 1999	Socorro	LINEAR	·	3.7 km	MPC · JPL
49516	1999 CJ_{32}	—	February 10, 1999	Socorro	LINEAR	·	11 km	MPC · JPL
49517	1999 CK_{32}	—	February 10, 1999	Socorro	LINEAR	slow	8.5 km	MPC · JPL
49518	1999 CN_{32}	—	February 10, 1999	Socorro	LINEAR	EOS	6.1 km	MPC · JPL
49519	1999 CU_{33}	—	February 10, 1999	Socorro	LINEAR	EOS	5.8 km	MPC · JPL
49520	1999 CX_{33}	—	February 10, 1999	Socorro	LINEAR	·	7.1 km	MPC · JPL
49521	1999 CC_{36}	—	February 10, 1999	Socorro	LINEAR	·	2.5 km	MPC · JPL
49522	1999 CK_{37}	—	February 10, 1999	Socorro	LINEAR	·	5.3 km	MPC · JPL
49523	1999 CL_{38}	—	February 10, 1999	Socorro	LINEAR	·	11 km	MPC · JPL
49524	1999 CJ_{39}	—	February 10, 1999	Socorro	LINEAR	·	4.9 km	MPC · JPL
49525	1999 CO_{40}	—	February 10, 1999	Socorro	LINEAR	EUN	4.7 km	MPC · JPL
49526	1999 CP_{40}	—	February 10, 1999	Socorro	LINEAR	TIR	4.8 km	MPC · JPL
49527	1999 CR_{44}	—	February 10, 1999	Socorro	LINEAR	·	3.7 km	MPC · JPL
49528	1999 CN_{46}	—	February 10, 1999	Socorro	LINEAR	·	7.5 km	MPC · JPL
49529	1999 CF_{48}	—	February 10, 1999	Socorro	LINEAR	·	5.3 km	MPC · JPL
49530	1999 CC_{50}	—	February 10, 1999	Socorro	LINEAR	·	7.3 km	MPC · JPL
49531	1999 CR_{51}	—	February 10, 1999	Socorro	LINEAR	EOS	7.1 km	MPC · JPL
49532	1999 CJ_{54}	—	February 10, 1999	Socorro	LINEAR	·	8.8 km	MPC · JPL
49533	1999 CN_{54}	—	February 10, 1999	Socorro	LINEAR	EOS	7.8 km	MPC · JPL
49534	1999 CO_{56}	—	February 10, 1999	Socorro	LINEAR	AEO	5.6 km	MPC · JPL
49535	1999 CB_{57}	—	February 10, 1999	Socorro	LINEAR	THM	8.1 km	MPC · JPL
49536	1999 CS_{60}	—	February 12, 1999	Socorro	LINEAR	·	4.7 km	MPC · JPL
49537	1999 CY_{60}	—	February 12, 1999	Socorro	LINEAR	·	6.1 km	MPC · JPL
49538	1999 CH_{61}	—	February 12, 1999	Socorro	LINEAR	HYG	7.6 km	MPC · JPL
49539	1999 CQ_{62}	—	February 12, 1999	Socorro	LINEAR	EUN	4.0 km	MPC · JPL
49540	1999 CU_{63}	—	February 12, 1999	Socorro	LINEAR	(5651)	11 km	MPC · JPL
49541	1999 CO_{66}	—	February 12, 1999	Socorro	LINEAR	EOS	6.2 km	MPC · JPL
49542	1999 CT_{70}	—	February 12, 1999	Socorro	LINEAR	·	9.9 km	MPC · JPL
49543	1999 CD_{76}	—	February 12, 1999	Socorro	LINEAR	·	4.8 km	MPC · JPL
49544	1999 CA_{77}	—	February 12, 1999	Socorro	LINEAR	EOS	5.8 km	MPC · JPL
49545	1999 CJ_{77}	—	February 12, 1999	Socorro	LINEAR	EOS	5.5 km	MPC · JPL
49546	1999 CG_{79}	—	February 12, 1999	Socorro	LINEAR	DOR	7.9 km	MPC · JPL
49547	1999 CY_{82}	—	February 10, 1999	Socorro	LINEAR	·	8.2 km	MPC · JPL
49548	1999 CP_{83}	—	February 10, 1999	Socorro	LINEAR	·	7.7 km	MPC · JPL
49549	1999 CL_{84}	—	February 10, 1999	Socorro	LINEAR	·	6.5 km	MPC · JPL
49550	1999 CO_{84}	—	February 10, 1999	Socorro	LINEAR	·	4.3 km	MPC · JPL
49551	1999 CV_{84}	—	February 10, 1999	Socorro	LINEAR	GEF	3.4 km	MPC · JPL
49552	1999 CF_{85}	—	February 10, 1999	Socorro	LINEAR	·	2.9 km	MPC · JPL
49553	1999 CB_{87}	—	February 10, 1999	Socorro	LINEAR	DOR	7.7 km	MPC · JPL
49554	1999 CG_{87}	—	February 10, 1999	Socorro	LINEAR	·	4.6 km	MPC · JPL
49555	1999 CK_{88}	—	February 10, 1999	Socorro	LINEAR	·	5.6 km	MPC · JPL
49556	1999 CJ_{91}	—	February 10, 1999	Socorro	LINEAR	·	9.0 km	MPC · JPL
49557	1999 CQ_{91}	—	February 10, 1999	Socorro	LINEAR	·	5.4 km	MPC · JPL
49558	1999 CN_{92}	—	February 10, 1999	Socorro	LINEAR	·	4.9 km	MPC · JPL
49559	1999 CU_{92}	—	February 10, 1999	Socorro	LINEAR	·	5.1 km	MPC · JPL
49560	1999 CQ_{93}	—	February 10, 1999	Socorro	LINEAR	·	6.4 km	MPC · JPL
49561	1999 CA_{98}	—	February 10, 1999	Socorro	LINEAR	·	6.2 km	MPC · JPL
49562	1999 CF_{100}	—	February 10, 1999	Socorro	LINEAR	GEF	3.9 km	MPC · JPL
49563	1999 CQ_{100}	—	February 10, 1999	Socorro	LINEAR	·	7.7 km	MPC · JPL
49564	1999 CN_{103}	—	February 12, 1999	Socorro	LINEAR	·	5.7 km	MPC · JPL
49565	1999 CK_{104}	—	February 12, 1999	Socorro	LINEAR	THM	7.2 km	MPC · JPL
49566	1999 CM_{106}	—	February 12, 1999	Socorro	LINEAR	·	9.4 km	MPC · JPL
49567	1999 CP_{107}	—	February 12, 1999	Socorro	LINEAR	EOS ·	7.8 km	MPC · JPL
49568	1999 CT_{107}	—	February 12, 1999	Socorro	LINEAR	(5651)	11 km	MPC · JPL
49569	1999 CH_{109}	—	February 12, 1999	Socorro	LINEAR	·	6.5 km	MPC · JPL
49570	1999 CQ_{110}	—	February 12, 1999	Socorro	LINEAR	EOS	7.3 km	MPC · JPL
49571	1999 CA_{113}	—	February 12, 1999	Socorro	LINEAR	·	8.2 km	MPC · JPL
49572	1999 CE_{114}	—	February 12, 1999	Socorro	LINEAR	·	4.0 km	MPC · JPL
49573	1999 CB_{118}	—	February 12, 1999	Socorro	LINEAR	·	11 km	MPC · JPL
49574	1999 CO_{119}	—	February 11, 1999	Socorro	LINEAR	TIR	5.9 km	MPC · JPL
49575	1999 CX_{119}	—	February 11, 1999	Socorro	LINEAR	EUN	3.8 km	MPC · JPL
49576	1999 CN_{121}	—	February 11, 1999	Socorro	LINEAR	HNS	5.6 km	MPC · JPL
49577	1999 CB_{124}	—	February 11, 1999	Socorro	LINEAR	·	7.0 km	MPC · JPL
49578	1999 CD_{124}	—	February 11, 1999	Socorro	LINEAR	·	4.2 km	MPC · JPL
49579	1999 CL_{124}	—	February 11, 1999	Socorro	LINEAR	MAR	3.5 km	MPC · JPL
49580	1999 CL_{126}	—	February 11, 1999	Socorro	LINEAR	·	4.1 km	MPC · JPL
49581	1999 CO_{127}	—	February 11, 1999	Socorro	LINEAR	slow	10 km	MPC · JPL
49582	1999 CB_{128}	—	February 11, 1999	Outside Phoenix, Arizona	LINEAR	EUN	5.0 km	MPC · JPL
49583	1999 CU_{132}	—	February 9, 1999	Kitt Peak	Spacewatch	NYS	3.4 km	MPC · JPL
49584	1999 CE_{133}	—	February 7, 1999	Kitt Peak	Spacewatch	THM	7.6 km	MPC · JPL
49585	1999 CO_{137}	—	February 9, 1999	Kitt Peak	Spacewatch	·	8.2 km	MPC · JPL
49586	1999 CD_{138}	—	February 11, 1999	Kitt Peak	Spacewatch	slow	6.0 km	MPC · JPL
49587	1999 CL_{145}	—	February 8, 1999	Kitt Peak	Spacewatch	·	6.8 km	MPC · JPL
49588	1999 CJ_{149}	—	February 13, 1999	Kitt Peak	Spacewatch	·	4.2 km	MPC · JPL
49589	1999 CQ_{149}	—	February 13, 1999	Kitt Peak	Spacewatch	·	4.6 km	MPC · JPL
49590	1999 DZ_{1}	—	February 18, 1999	Haleakala	NEAT	·	6.4 km	MPC · JPL
49591	1999 DO_{2}	—	February 19, 1999	Oizumi	T. Kobayashi	·	18 km	MPC · JPL
49592	1999 DD_{7}	—	February 25, 1999	Uccle	T. Pauwels	NAE	10 km	MPC · JPL
49593	1999 DX_{7}	—	February 18, 1999	Anderson Mesa	LONEOS	EOS	6.7 km	MPC · JPL
49594	1999 EM_{13}	—	March 10, 1999	Kitt Peak	Spacewatch	·	7.0 km	MPC · JPL
49595	1999 FG	—	March 16, 1999	Višnjan Observatory	K. Korlević, M. Jurić	EOS	7.3 km	MPC · JPL
49596	1999 FT_{4}	—	March 17, 1999	Kitt Peak	Spacewatch	·	1.6 km	MPC · JPL
49597	1999 FY_{12}	—	March 19, 1999	Kitt Peak	Spacewatch	EOS	5.5 km	MPC · JPL
49598	1999 FU_{17}	—	March 23, 1999	Kitt Peak	Spacewatch	·	15 km	MPC · JPL
49599	1999 FM_{18}	—	March 22, 1999	Anderson Mesa	LONEOS	·	12 km	MPC · JPL
49600	1999 FN_{18}	—	March 22, 1999	Anderson Mesa	LONEOS	·	13 km	MPC · JPL

== 49601–49700 ==
back to top

Designation			Discovery			Properties		Ref
Permanent	Provisional	Named after	Date	Site	Discoverer(s)	Category	Diam.	Ref
49601	1999 FG_{22}	—	March 19, 1999	Socorro	LINEAR	·	9.3 km	MPC · JPL
49602	1999 FH_{24}	—	March 19, 1999	Socorro	LINEAR	·	11 km	MPC · JPL
49603	1999 FC_{25}	—	March 19, 1999	Socorro	LINEAR	·	8.2 km	MPC · JPL
49604	1999 FP_{25}	—	March 19, 1999	Socorro	LINEAR	HYG	8.4 km	MPC · JPL
49605	1999 FE_{26}	—	March 19, 1999	Socorro	LINEAR	HYG	9.2 km	MPC · JPL
49606	1999 FU_{27}	—	March 19, 1999	Socorro	LINEAR	·	16 km	MPC · JPL
49607	1999 FC_{28}	—	March 19, 1999	Socorro	LINEAR	·	10 km	MPC · JPL
49608	1999 FX_{28}	—	March 19, 1999	Socorro	LINEAR	THM	7.1 km	MPC · JPL
49609	1999 FO_{29}	—	March 19, 1999	Socorro	LINEAR	·	6.7 km	MPC · JPL
49610	1999 FY_{29}	—	March 19, 1999	Socorro	LINEAR	·	2.4 km	MPC · JPL
49611	1999 FV_{30}	—	March 19, 1999	Socorro	LINEAR	·	7.7 km	MPC · JPL
49612	1999 FA_{31}	—	March 19, 1999	Socorro	LINEAR	·	9.5 km	MPC · JPL
49613	1999 FS_{32}	—	March 23, 1999	Višnjan Observatory	K. Korlević	THM	8.8 km	MPC · JPL
49614	1999 FB_{39}	—	March 20, 1999	Socorro	LINEAR	·	9.1 km	MPC · JPL
49615	1999 FW_{41}	—	March 20, 1999	Socorro	LINEAR	·	7.1 km	MPC · JPL
49616	1999 FY_{42}	—	March 20, 1999	Socorro	LINEAR	·	10 km	MPC · JPL
49617	1999 FJ_{43}	—	March 20, 1999	Socorro	LINEAR	·	6.4 km	MPC · JPL
49618	1999 FC_{44}	—	March 20, 1999	Socorro	LINEAR	·	6.2 km	MPC · JPL
49619	1999 FU_{46}	—	March 20, 1999	Socorro	LINEAR	·	7.0 km	MPC · JPL
49620	1999 FH_{51}	—	March 20, 1999	Socorro	LINEAR	EOS	6.8 km	MPC · JPL
49621	1999 GL	—	April 6, 1999	Prescott	P. G. Comba	NYS	1.7 km	MPC · JPL
49622	1999 GO_{3}	—	April 9, 1999	Višnjan Observatory	K. Korlević	VER	11 km	MPC · JPL
49623	1999 GB_{5}	—	April 7, 1999	Nachi-Katsuura	Y. Shimizu, T. Urata	·	8.9 km	MPC · JPL
49624	1999 GR_{10}	—	April 11, 1999	Kitt Peak	Spacewatch	·	7.7 km	MPC · JPL
49625	1999 GS_{10}	—	April 11, 1999	Kitt Peak	Spacewatch	·	4.9 km	MPC · JPL
49626	1999 GL_{16}	—	April 9, 1999	Socorro	LINEAR	·	7.7 km	MPC · JPL
49627	1999 GP_{16}	—	April 15, 1999	Socorro	LINEAR	EUN · fast	5.9 km	MPC · JPL
49628	1999 GV_{16}	—	April 15, 1999	Socorro	LINEAR	EOS	10 km	MPC · JPL
49629	1999 GF_{20}	—	April 15, 1999	Socorro	LINEAR	·	7.4 km	MPC · JPL
49630	1999 GB_{21}	—	April 15, 1999	Socorro	LINEAR	·	22 km	MPC · JPL
49631	1999 GA_{23}	—	April 6, 1999	Socorro	LINEAR	·	8.5 km	MPC · JPL
49632	1999 GV_{37}	—	April 12, 1999	Socorro	LINEAR	·	9.0 km	MPC · JPL
49633	1999 GC_{38}	—	April 12, 1999	Socorro	LINEAR	·	14 km	MPC · JPL
49634	1999 GS_{41}	—	April 12, 1999	Socorro	LINEAR	·	12 km	MPC · JPL
49635	1999 GA_{47}	—	April 6, 1999	Anderson Mesa	LONEOS	EOS	8.7 km	MPC · JPL
49636	1999 HJ_{1}	—	April 16, 1999	Socorro	LINEAR	PHO	3.9 km	MPC · JPL
49637	1999 HO_{8}	—	April 16, 1999	Socorro	LINEAR	·	6.2 km	MPC · JPL
49638	1999 HK_{9}	—	April 17, 1999	Socorro	LINEAR	EOS	11 km	MPC · JPL
49639	1999 JJ_{17}	—	May 15, 1999	Kitt Peak	Spacewatch	fast	8.1 km	MPC · JPL
49640	1999 JH_{19}	—	May 10, 1999	Socorro	LINEAR	·	11 km	MPC · JPL
49641	1999 JX_{25}	—	May 10, 1999	Socorro	LINEAR	·	10 km	MPC · JPL
49642	1999 JK_{26}	—	May 10, 1999	Socorro	LINEAR	slow	6.1 km	MPC · JPL
49643	1999 JH_{31}	—	May 10, 1999	Socorro	LINEAR	EOS	5.0 km	MPC · JPL
49644	1999 JJ_{33}	—	May 10, 1999	Socorro	LINEAR	·	9.5 km	MPC · JPL
49645	1999 JU_{34}	—	May 10, 1999	Socorro	LINEAR	·	5.9 km	MPC · JPL
49646	1999 JX_{34}	—	May 10, 1999	Socorro	LINEAR	·	6.9 km	MPC · JPL
49647	1999 JW_{37}	—	May 10, 1999	Socorro	LINEAR	(1118)	15 km	MPC · JPL
49648	1999 JR_{45}	—	May 10, 1999	Socorro	LINEAR	·	9.5 km	MPC · JPL
49649	1999 JC_{46}	—	May 10, 1999	Socorro	LINEAR	V	2.4 km	MPC · JPL
49650	1999 JH_{61}	—	May 10, 1999	Socorro	LINEAR	·	17 km	MPC · JPL
49651	1999 JR_{66}	—	May 12, 1999	Socorro	LINEAR	CYB	15 km	MPC · JPL
49652	1999 JW_{81}	—	May 12, 1999	Socorro	LINEAR	PHO	3.2 km	MPC · JPL
49653	1999 JO_{85}	—	May 15, 1999	Socorro	LINEAR	MAR	5.5 km	MPC · JPL
49654	1999 JV_{85}	—	May 12, 1999	Socorro	LINEAR	·	10 km	MPC · JPL
49655	1999 JY_{87}	—	May 12, 1999	Socorro	LINEAR	EOS	6.1 km	MPC · JPL
49656	1999 JK_{92}	—	May 12, 1999	Socorro	LINEAR	·	9.4 km	MPC · JPL
49657	1999 JH_{99}	—	May 12, 1999	Socorro	LINEAR	·	10 km	MPC · JPL
49658	1999 JK_{105}	—	May 13, 1999	Socorro	LINEAR	·	6.5 km	MPC · JPL
49659	1999 JC_{118}	—	May 13, 1999	Socorro	LINEAR	TIR	5.9 km	MPC · JPL
49660	1999 JU_{130}	—	May 13, 1999	Socorro	LINEAR	EOS	5.6 km	MPC · JPL
49661	1999 JH_{138}	—	May 8, 1999	Socorro	LINEAR	·	14 km	MPC · JPL
49662	1999 KC_{3}	—	May 17, 1999	Kitt Peak	Spacewatch	URS	14 km	MPC · JPL
49663	1999 LV_{4}	—	June 8, 1999	Socorro	LINEAR	·	13 km	MPC · JPL
49664	1999 MV	—	June 22, 1999	Catalina	CSS	H · slow	1.6 km	MPC · JPL
49665	1999 NL_{2}	—	July 12, 1999	Socorro	LINEAR	H	1.3 km	MPC · JPL
49666	1999 NZ_{57}	—	July 13, 1999	Socorro	LINEAR	H	1.8 km	MPC · JPL
49667	1999 OM_{2}	—	July 22, 1999	Socorro	LINEAR	H	3.1 km	MPC · JPL
49668	1999 OP_{2}	—	July 22, 1999	Socorro	LINEAR	H · fast?	1.8 km	MPC · JPL
49669	1999 RZ_{30}	—	September 8, 1999	Socorro	LINEAR	H	2.7 km	MPC · JPL
49670	1999 RZ_{33}	—	September 10, 1999	Socorro	LINEAR	H	1.1 km	MPC · JPL
49671	1999 RP_{46}	—	September 7, 1999	Socorro	LINEAR	EOS · slow	11 km	MPC · JPL
49672	1999 RM_{103}	—	September 8, 1999	Socorro	LINEAR	V	2.2 km	MPC · JPL
49673	1999 RA_{215}	—	September 13, 1999	Kitt Peak	D. Davis, B. Gladman, Meese, C.	cubewano (hot)	142 km	MPC · JPL
49674	1999 SB_{5}	—	September 30, 1999	Socorro	LINEAR	H	2.8 km	MPC · JPL
49675	1999 SW_{27}	—	September 18, 1999	Socorro	LINEAR	H	1.9 km	MPC · JPL
49676	1999 TZ_{2}	—	October 2, 1999	Catalina	CSS	slow	2.2 km	MPC · JPL
49677	1999 TB_{3}	—	October 4, 1999	Prescott	P. G. Comba	·	1.6 km	MPC · JPL
49678	1999 TQ_{7}	—	October 2, 1999	Socorro	LINEAR	H	1.1 km	MPC · JPL
49679	1999 TZ_{7}	—	October 6, 1999	Črni Vrh	Mikuž, H.	·	2.3 km	MPC · JPL
49680	1999 TN_{9}	—	October 7, 1999	Višnjan Observatory	K. Korlević, M. Jurić	V	2.0 km	MPC · JPL
49681	1999 TN_{25}	—	October 3, 1999	Socorro	LINEAR	·	11 km	MPC · JPL
49682	1999 TT_{29}	—	October 4, 1999	Socorro	LINEAR	·	1.7 km	MPC · JPL
49683	1999 TX_{70}	—	October 9, 1999	Kitt Peak	Spacewatch	·	4.1 km	MPC · JPL
49684	1999 TH_{137}	—	October 6, 1999	Socorro	LINEAR	·	2.6 km	MPC · JPL
49685	1999 TT_{145}	—	October 7, 1999	Socorro	LINEAR	·	1.5 km	MPC · JPL
49686	1999 TP_{154}	—	October 7, 1999	Socorro	LINEAR	·	1.7 km	MPC · JPL
49687	1999 TQ_{178}	—	October 10, 1999	Socorro	LINEAR	·	1.6 km	MPC · JPL
49688	1999 TO_{198}	—	October 12, 1999	Socorro	LINEAR	·	2.6 km	MPC · JPL
49689	1999 TM_{200}	—	October 12, 1999	Socorro	LINEAR	·	2.4 km	MPC · JPL
49690	1999 TB_{212}	—	October 15, 1999	Socorro	LINEAR	·	2.1 km	MPC · JPL
49691	1999 TJ_{230}	—	October 3, 1999	Catalina	CSS	·	2.0 km	MPC · JPL
49692	1999 UB_{7}	—	October 29, 1999	Kitt Peak	Spacewatch	·	3.1 km	MPC · JPL
49693	1999 UR_{10}	—	October 31, 1999	Socorro	LINEAR	PHO	3.1 km	MPC · JPL
49694	1999 US_{41}	—	October 18, 1999	Anderson Mesa	LONEOS	PHO	2.4 km	MPC · JPL
49695	1999 UF_{42}	—	October 20, 1999	Anderson Mesa	LONEOS	·	2.3 km	MPC · JPL
49696	1999 UW_{42}	—	October 28, 1999	Catalina	CSS	·	2.1 km	MPC · JPL
49697	1999 UK_{52}	—	October 31, 1999	Catalina	CSS	·	1.9 km	MPC · JPL
49698 Váchal	1999 VA	Váchal	November 1, 1999	Kleť	J. Tichá, M. Tichý	·	3.2 km	MPC · JPL
49699 Hidetakasato	1999 VZ	Hidetakasato	November 3, 1999	Yatsuka	H. Abe	PHO	5.2 km	MPC · JPL
49700 Mather	1999 VN_{1}	Mather	November 1, 1999	Uccle	E. W. Elst, Ipatov, S. I.	·	2.1 km	MPC · JPL

== 49701–49800 ==
back to top

Designation			Discovery			Properties		Ref
Permanent	Provisional	Named after	Date	Site	Discoverer(s)	Category	Diam.	Ref
49701	1999 VZ_{1}	—	November 5, 1999	Oaxaca	Roe, J. M.	·	1.7 km	MPC · JPL
49702 Koikeda	1999 VC_{2}	Koikeda	November 4, 1999	Yanagida	Tsuchikawa, A.	·	3.3 km	MPC · JPL
49703	1999 VT_{12}	—	November 11, 1999	Fountain Hills	C. W. Juels	·	2.1 km	MPC · JPL
49704	1999 VR_{15}	—	November 2, 1999	Kitt Peak	Spacewatch	·	1.7 km	MPC · JPL
49705	1999 VC_{19}	—	November 11, 1999	Farpoint	G. Bell, G. Hug	V	2.2 km	MPC · JPL
49706	1999 VB_{21}	—	November 10, 1999	Gekko	T. Kagawa	·	4.8 km	MPC · JPL
49707	1999 VZ_{23}	—	November 13, 1999	Uto	F. Uto	·	3.1 km	MPC · JPL
49708	1999 VH_{26}	—	November 3, 1999	Socorro	LINEAR	NYS	2.8 km	MPC · JPL
49709	1999 VJ_{26}	—	November 3, 1999	Socorro	LINEAR	·	2.1 km	MPC · JPL
49710	1999 VC_{27}	—	November 3, 1999	Socorro	LINEAR	·	2.3 km	MPC · JPL
49711	1999 VB_{29}	—	November 3, 1999	Socorro	LINEAR	·	1.8 km	MPC · JPL
49712	1999 VP_{29}	—	November 3, 1999	Socorro	LINEAR	V	1.6 km	MPC · JPL
49713	1999 VB_{34}	—	November 3, 1999	Socorro	LINEAR	·	1.6 km	MPC · JPL
49714	1999 VP_{34}	—	November 3, 1999	Socorro	LINEAR	·	6.3 km	MPC · JPL
49715	1999 VZ_{34}	—	November 3, 1999	Socorro	LINEAR	·	2.9 km	MPC · JPL
49716	1999 VZ_{35}	—	November 3, 1999	Socorro	LINEAR	·	4.1 km	MPC · JPL
49717	1999 VR_{36}	—	November 3, 1999	Socorro	LINEAR	·	4.1 km	MPC · JPL
49718	1999 VP_{39}	—	November 10, 1999	Socorro	LINEAR	·	1.8 km	MPC · JPL
49719	1999 VE_{50}	—	November 3, 1999	Socorro	LINEAR	fast?	2.6 km	MPC · JPL
49720	1999 VV_{52}	—	November 3, 1999	Socorro	LINEAR	·	2.5 km	MPC · JPL
49721	1999 VX_{52}	—	November 3, 1999	Socorro	LINEAR	BAP	3.0 km	MPC · JPL
49722	1999 VS_{63}	—	November 4, 1999	Socorro	LINEAR	·	3.5 km	MPC · JPL
49723	1999 VX_{64}	—	November 4, 1999	Socorro	LINEAR	·	4.2 km	MPC · JPL
49724	1999 VQ_{66}	—	November 4, 1999	Socorro	LINEAR	·	2.3 km	MPC · JPL
49725	1999 VD_{67}	—	November 4, 1999	Socorro	LINEAR	·	1.6 km	MPC · JPL
49726	1999 VF_{67}	—	November 4, 1999	Socorro	LINEAR	·	1.2 km	MPC · JPL
49727	1999 VG_{69}	—	November 4, 1999	Socorro	LINEAR	·	1.9 km	MPC · JPL
49728	1999 VE_{72}	—	November 11, 1999	Xinglong	SCAP	·	5.1 km	MPC · JPL
49729	1999 VB_{73}	—	November 12, 1999	Socorro	LINEAR	·	1.9 km	MPC · JPL
49730	1999 VQ_{78}	—	November 4, 1999	Socorro	LINEAR	·	1.6 km	MPC · JPL
49731	1999 VR_{80}	—	November 4, 1999	Socorro	LINEAR	ERI	5.1 km	MPC · JPL
49732	1999 VX_{85}	—	November 4, 1999	Socorro	LINEAR	·	2.2 km	MPC · JPL
49733	1999 VB_{103}	—	November 9, 1999	Socorro	LINEAR	·	3.1 km	MPC · JPL
49734	1999 VR_{106}	—	November 9, 1999	Socorro	LINEAR	·	1.5 km	MPC · JPL
49735	1999 VX_{106}	—	November 9, 1999	Socorro	LINEAR	·	2.8 km	MPC · JPL
49736	1999 VU_{109}	—	November 9, 1999	Socorro	LINEAR	·	2.0 km	MPC · JPL
49737	1999 VS_{112}	—	November 9, 1999	Socorro	LINEAR	·	2.8 km	MPC · JPL
49738	1999 VP_{113}	—	November 4, 1999	Catalina	CSS	·	1.6 km	MPC · JPL
49739	1999 VZ_{121}	—	November 4, 1999	Kitt Peak	Spacewatch	NYS	2.5 km	MPC · JPL
49740	1999 VV_{123}	—	November 5, 1999	Kitt Peak	Spacewatch	·	2.7 km	MPC · JPL
49741	1999 VW_{124}	—	November 9, 1999	Socorro	LINEAR	ERI	3.7 km	MPC · JPL
49742	1999 VS_{129}	—	November 11, 1999	Kitt Peak	Spacewatch	·	2.0 km	MPC · JPL
49743	1999 VP_{143}	—	November 11, 1999	Catalina	CSS	·	1.5 km	MPC · JPL
49744	1999 VO_{145}	—	November 9, 1999	Socorro	LINEAR	NYS	3.1 km	MPC · JPL
49745	1999 VM_{153}	—	November 11, 1999	Kitt Peak	Spacewatch	·	1.8 km	MPC · JPL
49746	1999 VG_{156}	—	November 12, 1999	Socorro	LINEAR	·	2.5 km	MPC · JPL
49747	1999 VK_{161}	—	November 14, 1999	Socorro	LINEAR	PHO	4.4 km	MPC · JPL
49748	1999 VD_{166}	—	November 14, 1999	Socorro	LINEAR	·	2.0 km	MPC · JPL
49749	1999 VQ_{166}	—	November 14, 1999	Socorro	LINEAR	·	2.8 km	MPC · JPL
49750	1999 VV_{167}	—	November 14, 1999	Socorro	LINEAR	·	2.5 km	MPC · JPL
49751	1999 VL_{168}	—	November 14, 1999	Socorro	LINEAR	·	1.9 km	MPC · JPL
49752	1999 VP_{169}	—	November 14, 1999	Socorro	LINEAR	·	1.5 km	MPC · JPL
49753	1999 VD_{172}	—	November 14, 1999	Socorro	LINEAR	NYS	3.7 km	MPC · JPL
49754	1999 VL_{172}	—	November 14, 1999	Socorro	LINEAR	V	1.9 km	MPC · JPL
49755	1999 VO_{172}	—	November 14, 1999	Socorro	LINEAR	·	2.1 km	MPC · JPL
49756	1999 VJ_{177}	—	November 5, 1999	Socorro	LINEAR	slow	1.5 km	MPC · JPL
49757	1999 VO_{183}	—	November 12, 1999	Socorro	LINEAR	·	1.8 km	MPC · JPL
49758	1999 VY_{188}	—	November 15, 1999	Socorro	LINEAR	·	3.4 km	MPC · JPL
49759	1999 VX_{189}	—	November 15, 1999	Socorro	LINEAR	·	2.0 km	MPC · JPL
49760	1999 VK_{190}	—	November 15, 1999	Socorro	LINEAR	·	1.7 km	MPC · JPL
49761	1999 VU_{201}	—	November 3, 1999	Socorro	LINEAR	·	2.7 km	MPC · JPL
49762	1999 VQ_{207}	—	November 13, 1999	Catalina	CSS	H	1.4 km	MPC · JPL
49763	1999 VO_{210}	—	November 12, 1999	Anderson Mesa	LONEOS	(2076)	2.1 km	MPC · JPL
49764	1999 VE_{212}	—	November 12, 1999	Socorro	LINEAR	MAS	1.6 km	MPC · JPL
49765	1999 VB_{217}	—	November 4, 1999	Socorro	LINEAR	·	2.6 km	MPC · JPL
49766	1999 WS	—	November 18, 1999	Oohira	T. Urata	·	2.4 km	MPC · JPL
49767	1999 WK_{2}	—	November 26, 1999	Višnjan Observatory	K. Korlević	·	3.2 km	MPC · JPL
49768	1999 WP_{3}	—	November 28, 1999	Oizumi	T. Kobayashi	V	1.5 km	MPC · JPL
49769	1999 WZ_{6}	—	November 28, 1999	Višnjan Observatory	K. Korlević	·	2.1 km	MPC · JPL
49770	1999 WC_{7}	—	November 28, 1999	Višnjan Observatory	K. Korlević	·	3.2 km	MPC · JPL
49771	1999 WP_{7}	—	November 28, 1999	Višnjan Observatory	K. Korlević	·	2.6 km	MPC · JPL
49772	1999 WT_{7}	—	November 28, 1999	Višnjan Observatory	K. Korlević	·	3.4 km	MPC · JPL
49773	1999 WJ_{8}	—	November 28, 1999	Oizumi	T. Kobayashi	·	3.6 km	MPC · JPL
49774	1999 WT_{9}	—	November 30, 1999	Oizumi	T. Kobayashi	·	2.4 km	MPC · JPL
49775	1999 WO_{13}	—	November 29, 1999	Višnjan Observatory	K. Korlević	·	3.6 km	MPC · JPL
49776	1999 WG_{18}	—	November 28, 1999	Višnjan Observatory	K. Korlević	·	2.2 km	MPC · JPL
49777 Cappi	1999 XS	Cappi	December 2, 1999	Prescott	P. G. Comba	·	2.8 km	MPC · JPL
49778	1999 XT	—	December 2, 1999	Socorro	LINEAR	·	2.0 km	MPC · JPL
49779	1999 XG_{3}	—	December 4, 1999	Catalina	CSS	(2076)	2.6 km	MPC · JPL
49780	1999 XG_{6}	—	December 4, 1999	Catalina	CSS	·	2.1 km	MPC · JPL
49781	1999 XT_{7}	—	December 4, 1999	Fountain Hills	C. W. Juels	EUN	5.2 km	MPC · JPL
49782	1999 XK_{9}	—	December 2, 1999	Kitt Peak	Spacewatch	PHO	3.9 km	MPC · JPL
49783	1999 XW_{9}	—	December 4, 1999	Kitt Peak	Spacewatch	NYS	2.3 km	MPC · JPL
49784	1999 XA_{10}	—	December 5, 1999	Kitt Peak	Spacewatch	·	1.7 km	MPC · JPL
49785	1999 XB_{10}	—	December 5, 1999	Kitt Peak	Spacewatch	·	1.9 km	MPC · JPL
49786	1999 XE_{11}	—	December 5, 1999	Catalina	CSS	·	1.8 km	MPC · JPL
49787	1999 XY_{11}	—	December 6, 1999	Catalina	CSS	PHO	3.0 km	MPC · JPL
49788	1999 XA_{13}	—	December 5, 1999	Socorro	LINEAR	·	2.0 km	MPC · JPL
49789	1999 XY_{15}	—	December 6, 1999	Višnjan Observatory	K. Korlević	NYS	4.6 km	MPC · JPL
49790	1999 XF_{20}	—	December 5, 1999	Socorro	LINEAR	·	2.4 km	MPC · JPL
49791	1999 XF_{31}	—	December 6, 1999	Socorro	LINEAR	V	1.5 km	MPC · JPL
49792	1999 XO_{31}	—	December 6, 1999	Socorro	LINEAR	·	5.8 km	MPC · JPL
49793	1999 XX_{31}	—	December 6, 1999	Socorro	LINEAR	·	5.3 km	MPC · JPL
49794	1999 XH_{32}	—	December 6, 1999	Socorro	LINEAR	·	3.2 km	MPC · JPL
49795	1999 XJ_{32}	—	December 6, 1999	Socorro	LINEAR	·	5.9 km	MPC · JPL
49796	1999 XS_{32}	—	December 6, 1999	Socorro	LINEAR	·	1.9 km	MPC · JPL
49797	1999 XC_{33}	—	December 6, 1999	Socorro	LINEAR	·	2.7 km	MPC · JPL
49798	1999 XL_{33}	—	December 6, 1999	Socorro	LINEAR	·	2.1 km	MPC · JPL
49799	1999 XB_{34}	—	December 6, 1999	Socorro	LINEAR	·	1.9 km	MPC · JPL
49800	1999 XL_{34}	—	December 6, 1999	Socorro	LINEAR	NYS ·	4.1 km	MPC · JPL

== 49801–49900 ==
back to top

Designation			Discovery			Properties		Ref
Permanent	Provisional	Named after	Date	Site	Discoverer(s)	Category	Diam.	Ref
49801	1999 XP_{34}	—	December 6, 1999	Socorro	LINEAR	·	6.7 km	MPC · JPL
49802	1999 XA_{35}	—	December 6, 1999	Socorro	LINEAR	·	4.2 km	MPC · JPL
49803	1999 XG_{35}	—	December 7, 1999	Socorro	LINEAR	·	1.5 km	MPC · JPL
49804	1999 XM_{35}	—	December 4, 1999	Catalina	CSS	·	2.1 km	MPC · JPL
49805	1999 XC_{36}	—	December 6, 1999	Oizumi	T. Kobayashi	PHO	5.4 km	MPC · JPL
49806	1999 XL_{38}	—	December 8, 1999	Socorro	LINEAR	·	2.3 km	MPC · JPL
49807	1999 XL_{39}	—	December 6, 1999	Socorro	LINEAR	·	2.9 km	MPC · JPL
49808	1999 XD_{40}	—	December 6, 1999	Socorro	LINEAR	PHO	4.3 km	MPC · JPL
49809	1999 XC_{42}	—	December 7, 1999	Socorro	LINEAR	·	2.2 km	MPC · JPL
49810	1999 XH_{43}	—	December 7, 1999	Socorro	LINEAR	·	2.4 km	MPC · JPL
49811	1999 XT_{44}	—	December 7, 1999	Socorro	LINEAR	NYS	2.9 km	MPC · JPL
49812	1999 XH_{46}	—	December 7, 1999	Socorro	LINEAR	·	1.6 km	MPC · JPL
49813	1999 XQ_{46}	—	December 7, 1999	Socorro	LINEAR	·	1.7 km	MPC · JPL
49814	1999 XL_{47}	—	December 7, 1999	Socorro	LINEAR	·	3.5 km	MPC · JPL
49815	1999 XK_{56}	—	December 7, 1999	Socorro	LINEAR	·	2.2 km	MPC · JPL
49816	1999 XZ_{57}	—	December 7, 1999	Socorro	LINEAR	·	2.5 km	MPC · JPL
49817	1999 XC_{58}	—	December 7, 1999	Socorro	LINEAR	·	2.4 km	MPC · JPL
49818	1999 XT_{58}	—	December 7, 1999	Socorro	LINEAR	·	2.4 km	MPC · JPL
49819	1999 XA_{59}	—	December 7, 1999	Socorro	LINEAR	·	1.8 km	MPC · JPL
49820	1999 XS_{64}	—	December 7, 1999	Socorro	LINEAR	·	2.9 km	MPC · JPL
49821	1999 XA_{70}	—	December 7, 1999	Socorro	LINEAR	·	1.5 km	MPC · JPL
49822	1999 XD_{70}	—	December 7, 1999	Socorro	LINEAR	·	2.4 km	MPC · JPL
49823	1999 XV_{71}	—	December 7, 1999	Socorro	LINEAR	NYS	3.3 km	MPC · JPL
49824	1999 XV_{73}	—	December 7, 1999	Socorro	LINEAR	·	2.8 km	MPC · JPL
49825	1999 XW_{73}	—	December 7, 1999	Socorro	LINEAR	(1338) (FLO)	1.8 km	MPC · JPL
49826	1999 XN_{74}	—	December 7, 1999	Socorro	LINEAR	·	3.3 km	MPC · JPL
49827	1999 XM_{77}	—	December 7, 1999	Socorro	LINEAR	·	2.4 km	MPC · JPL
49828	1999 XE_{82}	—	December 7, 1999	Socorro	LINEAR	·	1.1 km	MPC · JPL
49829	1999 XA_{83}	—	December 7, 1999	Socorro	LINEAR	·	2.7 km	MPC · JPL
49830	1999 XP_{83}	—	December 7, 1999	Socorro	LINEAR	NYS	3.6 km	MPC · JPL
49831	1999 XT_{83}	—	December 7, 1999	Socorro	LINEAR	NYS	2.9 km	MPC · JPL
49832	1999 XA_{84}	—	December 7, 1999	Socorro	LINEAR	·	3.2 km	MPC · JPL
49833	1999 XB_{84}	—	December 7, 1999	Socorro	LINEAR	NYS	4.3 km	MPC · JPL
49834	1999 XC_{84}	—	December 7, 1999	Socorro	LINEAR	PHO	2.9 km	MPC · JPL
49835	1999 XK_{84}	—	December 7, 1999	Socorro	LINEAR	·	2.0 km	MPC · JPL
49836	1999 XD_{85}	—	December 7, 1999	Socorro	LINEAR	NYS	3.4 km	MPC · JPL
49837	1999 XN_{85}	—	December 7, 1999	Socorro	LINEAR	·	3.0 km	MPC · JPL
49838	1999 XS_{86}	—	December 7, 1999	Socorro	LINEAR	·	5.2 km	MPC · JPL
49839	1999 XY_{87}	—	December 7, 1999	Socorro	LINEAR	·	4.3 km	MPC · JPL
49840	1999 XQ_{89}	—	December 7, 1999	Socorro	LINEAR	·	3.0 km	MPC · JPL
49841	1999 XN_{90}	—	December 7, 1999	Socorro	LINEAR	·	2.1 km	MPC · JPL
49842	1999 XS_{90}	—	December 7, 1999	Socorro	LINEAR	·	3.4 km	MPC · JPL
49843	1999 XP_{92}	—	December 7, 1999	Socorro	LINEAR	·	1.7 km	MPC · JPL
49844	1999 XR_{92}	—	December 7, 1999	Socorro	LINEAR	·	1.7 km	MPC · JPL
49845	1999 XA_{93}	—	December 7, 1999	Socorro	LINEAR	·	1.9 km	MPC · JPL
49846	1999 XE_{93}	—	December 7, 1999	Socorro	LINEAR	·	3.3 km	MPC · JPL
49847	1999 XO_{93}	—	December 7, 1999	Socorro	LINEAR	(2076)	2.7 km	MPC · JPL
49848	1999 XG_{94}	—	December 7, 1999	Socorro	LINEAR	V	2.5 km	MPC · JPL
49849	1999 XK_{94}	—	December 7, 1999	Socorro	LINEAR	PHO	10 km	MPC · JPL
49850	1999 XM_{94}	—	December 7, 1999	Socorro	LINEAR	·	3.0 km	MPC · JPL
49851	1999 XM_{95}	—	December 7, 1999	Oizumi	T. Kobayashi	·	3.0 km	MPC · JPL
49852	1999 XA_{96}	—	December 9, 1999	Oizumi	T. Kobayashi	·	2.2 km	MPC · JPL
49853	1999 XG_{96}	—	December 7, 1999	Socorro	LINEAR	V	2.4 km	MPC · JPL
49854	1999 XB_{98}	—	December 7, 1999	Socorro	LINEAR	·	2.8 km	MPC · JPL
49855	1999 XV_{98}	—	December 7, 1999	Socorro	LINEAR	·	3.5 km	MPC · JPL
49856	1999 XC_{99}	—	December 7, 1999	Socorro	LINEAR	·	4.0 km	MPC · JPL
49857	1999 XD_{99}	—	December 7, 1999	Socorro	LINEAR	·	4.4 km	MPC · JPL
49858	1999 XZ_{99}	—	December 7, 1999	Socorro	LINEAR	·	4.3 km	MPC · JPL
49859	1999 XB_{100}	—	December 7, 1999	Socorro	LINEAR	·	6.6 km	MPC · JPL
49860	1999 XO_{100}	—	December 7, 1999	Socorro	LINEAR	·	3.2 km	MPC · JPL
49861	1999 XG_{101}	—	December 7, 1999	Socorro	LINEAR	·	2.2 km	MPC · JPL
49862	1999 XC_{104}	—	December 9, 1999	Gekko	T. Kagawa	·	2.1 km	MPC · JPL
49863	1999 XK_{104}	—	December 7, 1999	Socorro	LINEAR	·	4.2 km	MPC · JPL
49864	1999 XS_{104}	—	December 10, 1999	Oizumi	T. Kobayashi	·	3.2 km	MPC · JPL
49865	1999 XF_{108}	—	December 4, 1999	Catalina	CSS	·	2.6 km	MPC · JPL
49866	1999 XG_{111}	—	December 7, 1999	Catalina	CSS	EUN	4.5 km	MPC · JPL
49867	1999 XL_{111}	—	December 8, 1999	Catalina	CSS	·	3.6 km	MPC · JPL
49868	1999 XF_{112}	—	December 7, 1999	Socorro	LINEAR	·	1.9 km	MPC · JPL
49869	1999 XG_{115}	—	December 12, 1999	Calgary	Billings, G. W.	·	2.1 km	MPC · JPL
49870	1999 XK_{118}	—	December 5, 1999	Catalina	CSS	·	2.8 km	MPC · JPL
49871	1999 XY_{118}	—	December 5, 1999	Catalina	CSS	·	4.0 km	MPC · JPL
49872	1999 XT_{124}	—	December 7, 1999	Catalina	CSS	·	1.7 km	MPC · JPL
49873	1999 XZ_{124}	—	December 7, 1999	Catalina	CSS	V	2.0 km	MPC · JPL
49874	1999 XW_{129}	—	December 12, 1999	Socorro	LINEAR	·	2.5 km	MPC · JPL
49875	1999 XR_{130}	—	December 12, 1999	Socorro	LINEAR	·	2.5 km	MPC · JPL
49876	1999 XG_{131}	—	December 12, 1999	Socorro	LINEAR	·	4.9 km	MPC · JPL
49877	1999 XD_{133}	—	December 12, 1999	Socorro	LINEAR	·	3.8 km	MPC · JPL
49878	1999 XF_{134}	—	December 12, 1999	Socorro	LINEAR	·	3.0 km	MPC · JPL
49879	1999 XH_{135}	—	December 6, 1999	Socorro	LINEAR	·	2.4 km	MPC · JPL
49880	1999 XP_{135}	—	December 8, 1999	Socorro	LINEAR	·	2.2 km	MPC · JPL
49881	1999 XO_{138}	—	December 4, 1999	Kitt Peak	Spacewatch	·	2.4 km	MPC · JPL
49882	1999 XO_{140}	—	December 2, 1999	Kitt Peak	Spacewatch	·	3.6 km	MPC · JPL
49883	1999 XW_{140}	—	December 2, 1999	Kitt Peak	Spacewatch	·	2.4 km	MPC · JPL
49884	1999 XA_{144}	—	December 10, 1999	Socorro	LINEAR	V	2.0 km	MPC · JPL
49885	1999 XG_{146}	—	December 7, 1999	Kitt Peak	Spacewatch	·	1.7 km	MPC · JPL
49886	1999 XX_{151}	—	December 7, 1999	Kitt Peak	Spacewatch	NYS	5.2 km	MPC · JPL
49887	1999 XH_{156}	—	December 8, 1999	Socorro	LINEAR	NYS	3.0 km	MPC · JPL
49888	1999 XQ_{156}	—	December 8, 1999	Socorro	LINEAR	·	2.1 km	MPC · JPL
49889	1999 XA_{158}	—	December 8, 1999	Socorro	LINEAR	·	4.9 km	MPC · JPL
49890	1999 XE_{158}	—	December 8, 1999	Socorro	LINEAR	·	2.6 km	MPC · JPL
49891	1999 XF_{158}	—	December 8, 1999	Socorro	LINEAR	·	2.8 km	MPC · JPL
49892	1999 XG_{159}	—	December 8, 1999	Socorro	LINEAR	·	2.0 km	MPC · JPL
49893	1999 XF_{160}	—	December 8, 1999	Socorro	LINEAR	·	2.9 km	MPC · JPL
49894	1999 XJ_{160}	—	December 8, 1999	Socorro	LINEAR	·	2.7 km	MPC · JPL
49895	1999 XK_{160}	—	December 8, 1999	Socorro	LINEAR	·	2.2 km	MPC · JPL
49896	1999 XN_{160}	—	December 8, 1999	Socorro	LINEAR	·	3.1 km	MPC · JPL
49897	1999 XY_{160}	—	December 8, 1999	Socorro	LINEAR	·	2.8 km	MPC · JPL
49898	1999 XZ_{160}	—	December 8, 1999	Socorro	LINEAR	PHO	4.6 km	MPC · JPL
49899	1999 XA_{163}	—	December 8, 1999	Kitt Peak	Spacewatch	·	2.1 km	MPC · JPL
49900	1999 XV_{163}	—	December 8, 1999	Catalina	CSS	·	6.1 km	MPC · JPL

== 49901–50000 ==
back to top

Designation			Discovery			Properties		Ref
Permanent	Provisional	Named after	Date	Site	Discoverer(s)	Category	Diam.	Ref
49901	1999 XK_{164}	—	December 8, 1999	Socorro	LINEAR	·	2.3 km	MPC · JPL
49902	1999 XS_{164}	—	December 8, 1999	Socorro	LINEAR	GEF	3.0 km	MPC · JPL
49903	1999 XK_{165}	—	December 8, 1999	Socorro	LINEAR	(5)	3.2 km	MPC · JPL
49904	1999 XN_{165}	—	December 8, 1999	Socorro	LINEAR	·	5.2 km	MPC · JPL
49905	1999 XU_{165}	—	December 8, 1999	Socorro	LINEAR	·	2.1 km	MPC · JPL
49906	1999 XX_{165}	—	December 8, 1999	Socorro	LINEAR	·	3.7 km	MPC · JPL
49907	1999 XZ_{165}	—	December 9, 1999	Socorro	LINEAR	V	3.7 km	MPC · JPL
49908	1999 XZ_{168}	—	December 10, 1999	Socorro	LINEAR	·	3.2 km	MPC · JPL
49909	1999 XB_{169}	—	December 10, 1999	Socorro	LINEAR	·	4.1 km	MPC · JPL
49910	1999 XS_{169}	—	December 10, 1999	Socorro	LINEAR	·	2.8 km	MPC · JPL
49911	1999 XT_{169}	—	December 10, 1999	Socorro	LINEAR	·	4.4 km	MPC · JPL
49912	1999 XY_{170}	—	December 10, 1999	Socorro	LINEAR	slow	3.6 km	MPC · JPL
49913	1999 XE_{171}	—	December 10, 1999	Socorro	LINEAR	·	2.0 km	MPC · JPL
49914	1999 XG_{171}	—	December 10, 1999	Socorro	LINEAR	NYS	2.0 km	MPC · JPL
49915	1999 XU_{171}	—	December 10, 1999	Socorro	LINEAR	·	2.9 km	MPC · JPL
49916	1999 XV_{171}	—	December 10, 1999	Socorro	LINEAR	EUN	4.2 km	MPC · JPL
49917	1999 XG_{172}	—	December 10, 1999	Socorro	LINEAR	·	2.6 km	MPC · JPL
49918	1999 XX_{172}	—	December 10, 1999	Socorro	LINEAR	·	3.4 km	MPC · JPL
49919	1999 XY_{172}	—	December 10, 1999	Socorro	LINEAR	·	3.7 km	MPC · JPL
49920	1999 XV_{173}	—	December 10, 1999	Socorro	LINEAR	·	4.8 km	MPC · JPL
49921	1999 XL_{174}	—	December 10, 1999	Socorro	LINEAR	NYS	5.4 km	MPC · JPL
49922	1999 XP_{174}	—	December 10, 1999	Socorro	LINEAR	·	3.6 km	MPC · JPL
49923	1999 XQ_{174}	—	December 10, 1999	Socorro	LINEAR	MAR	5.3 km	MPC · JPL
49924	1999 XY_{174}	—	December 10, 1999	Socorro	LINEAR	(883)	3.5 km	MPC · JPL
49925	1999 XJ_{175}	—	December 10, 1999	Socorro	LINEAR	·	2.7 km	MPC · JPL
49926	1999 XK_{175}	—	December 10, 1999	Socorro	LINEAR	·	2.8 km	MPC · JPL
49927	1999 XG_{176}	—	December 10, 1999	Socorro	LINEAR	·	5.2 km	MPC · JPL
49928	1999 XN_{176}	—	December 10, 1999	Socorro	LINEAR	EUN	3.7 km	MPC · JPL
49929	1999 XU_{176}	—	December 10, 1999	Socorro	LINEAR	·	2.9 km	MPC · JPL
49930	1999 XZ_{176}	—	December 10, 1999	Socorro	LINEAR	ADE	11 km	MPC · JPL
49931	1999 XL_{177}	—	December 10, 1999	Socorro	LINEAR	·	3.3 km	MPC · JPL
49932	1999 XK_{178}	—	December 10, 1999	Socorro	LINEAR	·	2.1 km	MPC · JPL
49933	1999 XD_{179}	—	December 10, 1999	Socorro	LINEAR	·	2.4 km	MPC · JPL
49934	1999 XU_{179}	—	December 10, 1999	Socorro	LINEAR	·	2.7 km	MPC · JPL
49935	1999 XV_{179}	—	December 10, 1999	Socorro	LINEAR	·	3.3 km	MPC · JPL
49936	1999 XD_{180}	—	December 10, 1999	Socorro	LINEAR	·	4.3 km	MPC · JPL
49937	1999 XO_{180}	—	December 10, 1999	Socorro	LINEAR	·	3.4 km	MPC · JPL
49938	1999 XS_{180}	—	December 10, 1999	Socorro	LINEAR	ADE	11 km	MPC · JPL
49939	1999 XV_{180}	—	December 10, 1999	Socorro	LINEAR	·	2.7 km	MPC · JPL
49940	1999 XZ_{186}	—	December 12, 1999	Socorro	LINEAR	·	3.0 km	MPC · JPL
49941	1999 XN_{187}	—	December 12, 1999	Socorro	LINEAR	·	1.9 km	MPC · JPL
49942	1999 XL_{188}	—	December 12, 1999	Socorro	LINEAR	·	3.7 km	MPC · JPL
49943	1999 XW_{192}	—	December 12, 1999	Socorro	LINEAR	·	3.4 km	MPC · JPL
49944	1999 XQ_{193}	—	December 12, 1999	Socorro	LINEAR	(883)	2.5 km	MPC · JPL
49945	1999 XC_{201}	—	December 12, 1999	Socorro	LINEAR	·	1.4 km	MPC · JPL
49946	1999 XD_{204}	—	December 12, 1999	Socorro	LINEAR	V	2.2 km	MPC · JPL
49947	1999 XY_{204}	—	December 12, 1999	Socorro	LINEAR	ADE	8.7 km	MPC · JPL
49948	1999 XF_{205}	—	December 12, 1999	Socorro	LINEAR	·	3.8 km	MPC · JPL
49949	1999 XG_{207}	—	December 12, 1999	Socorro	LINEAR	·	2.3 km	MPC · JPL
49950	1999 XJ_{207}	—	December 12, 1999	Socorro	LINEAR	V	2.1 km	MPC · JPL
49951	1999 XT_{211}	—	December 13, 1999	Socorro	LINEAR	·	2.4 km	MPC · JPL
49952	1999 XH_{212}	—	December 14, 1999	Socorro	LINEAR	·	2.3 km	MPC · JPL
49953	1999 XL_{215}	—	December 14, 1999	Socorro	LINEAR	·	2.9 km	MPC · JPL
49954	1999 XL_{216}	—	December 13, 1999	Kitt Peak	Spacewatch	NYS	5.0 km	MPC · JPL
49955	1999 XU_{216}	—	December 13, 1999	Kitt Peak	Spacewatch	·	2.8 km	MPC · JPL
49956	1999 XZ_{220}	—	December 14, 1999	Socorro	LINEAR	·	5.3 km	MPC · JPL
49957	1999 XQ_{221}	—	December 15, 1999	Socorro	LINEAR	·	3.2 km	MPC · JPL
49958	1999 XC_{223}	—	December 15, 1999	Socorro	LINEAR	·	3.0 km	MPC · JPL
49959	1999 XJ_{225}	—	December 13, 1999	Kitt Peak	Spacewatch	(2076)	2.2 km	MPC · JPL
49960	1999 XN_{225}	—	December 13, 1999	Kitt Peak	Spacewatch	·	2.9 km	MPC · JPL
49961	1999 XZ_{226}	—	December 15, 1999	Kitt Peak	Spacewatch	·	1.7 km	MPC · JPL
49962	1999 XU_{227}	—	December 15, 1999	Kitt Peak	Spacewatch	·	3.8 km	MPC · JPL
49963	1999 XH_{228}	—	December 14, 1999	Kitt Peak	Spacewatch	·	3.0 km	MPC · JPL
49964	1999 XQ_{228}	—	December 14, 1999	Kitt Peak	Spacewatch	MAS	2.3 km	MPC · JPL
49965	1999 XA_{231}	—	December 7, 1999	Catalina	CSS	EUN	7.0 km	MPC · JPL
49966	1999 XT_{231}	—	December 8, 1999	Socorro	LINEAR	·	6.3 km	MPC · JPL
49967	1999 XC_{235}	—	December 3, 1999	Anderson Mesa	LONEOS	·	2.1 km	MPC · JPL
49968	1999 XN_{243}	—	December 3, 1999	Anderson Mesa	LONEOS	·	3.3 km	MPC · JPL
49969	1999 XS_{247}	—	December 6, 1999	Socorro	LINEAR	·	2.2 km	MPC · JPL
49970	1999 XD_{249}	—	December 6, 1999	Socorro	LINEAR	·	2.0 km	MPC · JPL
49971	1999 XZ_{249}	—	December 6, 1999	Socorro	LINEAR	·	2.1 km	MPC · JPL
49972	1999 XL_{255}	—	December 12, 1999	Kitt Peak	Spacewatch	·	2.1 km	MPC · JPL
49973	1999 YQ	—	December 16, 1999	Socorro	LINEAR	PHO	3.4 km	MPC · JPL
49974	1999 YT_{2}	—	December 16, 1999	Kitt Peak	Spacewatch	·	4.2 km	MPC · JPL
49975	1999 YZ_{2}	—	December 16, 1999	Socorro	LINEAR	PHO	2.5 km	MPC · JPL
49976	1999 YR_{4}	—	December 28, 1999	Farpoint	G. Hug, G. Bell	·	2.4 km	MPC · JPL
49977	1999 YS_{4}	—	December 28, 1999	Farpoint	G. Hug, G. Bell	·	2.9 km	MPC · JPL
49978	1999 YT_{5}	—	December 28, 1999	Socorro	LINEAR	PHO	3.7 km	MPC · JPL
49979	1999 YB_{8}	—	December 27, 1999	Kitt Peak	Spacewatch	·	2.6 km	MPC · JPL
49980	1999 YQ_{10}	—	December 27, 1999	Kitt Peak	Spacewatch	·	1.6 km	MPC · JPL
49981	1999 YJ_{13}	—	December 30, 1999	Višnjan Observatory	K. Korlević	·	2.9 km	MPC · JPL
49982	1999 YP_{22}	—	December 31, 1999	Anderson Mesa	LONEOS	PHO	4.3 km	MPC · JPL
49983	1999 YX_{22}	—	December 31, 1999	Anderson Mesa	LONEOS	·	2.3 km	MPC · JPL
49984	2000 AA_{1}	—	January 2, 2000	Kitt Peak	Spacewatch	V	1.9 km	MPC · JPL
49985	2000 AX_{1}	—	January 2, 2000	Višnjan Observatory	K. Korlević	·	1.9 km	MPC · JPL
49986	2000 AF_{2}	—	January 3, 2000	Oizumi	T. Kobayashi	·	2.3 km	MPC · JPL
49987 Bonata	2000 AB_{5}	Bonata	January 3, 2000	San Marcello	L. Tesi, G. Forti	·	3.3 km	MPC · JPL
49988	2000 AE_{5}	—	January 3, 2000	Gekko	T. Kagawa	·	2.0 km	MPC · JPL
49989	2000 AJ_{5}	—	January 2, 2000	Višnjan Observatory	K. Korlević	·	1.8 km	MPC · JPL
49990	2000 AK_{5}	—	January 4, 2000	Višnjan Observatory	K. Korlević	·	3.5 km	MPC · JPL
49991	2000 AZ_{5}	—	January 4, 2000	Kitt Peak	Spacewatch	·	2.0 km	MPC · JPL
49992	2000 AQ_{7}	—	January 2, 2000	Socorro	LINEAR	·	2.7 km	MPC · JPL
49993	2000 AH_{8}	—	January 2, 2000	Socorro	LINEAR	·	3.7 km	MPC · JPL
49994	2000 AR_{9}	—	January 2, 2000	Socorro	LINEAR	·	3.0 km	MPC · JPL
49995	2000 AG_{11}	—	January 3, 2000	Socorro	LINEAR	·	1.9 km	MPC · JPL
49996	2000 AP_{11}	—	January 3, 2000	Socorro	LINEAR	·	3.7 km	MPC · JPL
49997	2000 AZ_{12}	—	January 3, 2000	Socorro	LINEAR	·	6.1 km	MPC · JPL
49998	2000 AA_{13}	—	January 3, 2000	Socorro	LINEAR	·	2.2 km	MPC · JPL
49999	2000 AW_{14}	—	January 3, 2000	Socorro	LINEAR	·	4.0 km	MPC · JPL
50000 Quaoar	2002 LM_{60}	Quaoar	June 4, 2002	Palomar	C. A. Trujillo, M. E. Brown	cubewano (hot) · moon	1111 km	MPC · JPL

back to top

== See also ==
- Meanings of minor-planet names: 49001–50000
