= Fumiaki Uto =

Japanese astronomer

Minor planets discovered: 22
see § List of discovered minor planets

Fumiaki Uto (宇都 文昭, Uto Fumiaki) is a Japanese amateur astronomer and a discoverer of minor planets.

He is credited by the Minor Planet Center with the discovery of 21 numbered minor planets between 1992 and 1999. Among his discoveries are the named asteroids 7253 Nara, 7895 Kaseda, 8041 Masumoto, and 9648 Gotouhideo.

== List of discovered minor planets ==
| 7253 Nara | 13 February 1993 | list |
| 7895 Kaseda | 22 February 1995 | list |
| 8041 Masumoto | 15 November 1993 | list |
| 9648 Gotouhideo | 30 October 1995 | list |
| (12844) 1997 JE_{10} | 9 May 1997 | list |
| (14931) 1994 WR_{3} | 27 November 1994 | list |
| (18489) 1996 BV_{2} | 26 January 1996 | list |
| (19309) 1996 UK_{1} | 20 October 1996 | list |
| (21810) 1999 TK_{19} | 9 October 1999 | list |
| (22904) 1999 TL_{19} | 9 October 1999 | list |
| (22976) 1999 VY_{23} | 13 November 1999 | list |

| (24756) 1992 VF | 2 November 1992 | list |
| (25296) 1998 WD_{20} | 26 November 1998 | list |
| (27182) 1999 CL_{3} | 8 February 1999 | list |
| (35254) 1996 BW_{2} | 26 January 1996 | list |
| (44487) 1998 WC_{20} | 26 November 1998 | list |
| (49442) 1998 YD_{7} | 20 December 1998 | list |
| 49497 Tagashiramitsuo | 8 February 1999 | list |
| (49707) 1999 VZ_{23} | 13 November 1999 | list |
| (56097) 1999 BC_{12} | 21 January 1999 | list |
| (59834) 1999 RE_{37} | 9 September 1999 | list |
| (100327) 1995 QX | 22 August 1995 | list |

== See also ==
- List of minor planet discoverers § F. Uto
