= Donald R. Davis (astronomer) =

American astronomer

Donald R. Davis is an American astronomer specializing in the evolution of the Solar System. With William K. Hartmann, he was responsible for proposing a theory in 1975 of the creation of earth's moon by a catastrophic collision. He is credited by the Minor Planet Center with the co-discovery of the trans-Neptunian object (49673) 1999 RA215 in 1999.

In 2009, he was Academic Director at the Summer Science Program. A few months later, Davis arranged for the naming of an asteroid as 223877 Kutler, after Brendan Kutler—a student, whom he had worked with in that program—died in his sleep.

The main-belt asteroid 3638 Davis is named in his honor.
