= 49777 Cappi =

Asteroid

Discovery
- Discovered by: P. G. Comba
- Discovery site: Prescott Obs.
- Discovery date: 2 December 1999

Designations
- Named after: Margaret Comba (discoverer's wife)
- Alternative designations: 1999 XS · 2001 KD_{31}
- Minor planet category: main-belt · (inner) background

Orbital characteristics
- Epoch 4 September 2017 (JD 2458000.5)
- Uncertainty parameter 0
- Observation arc: 24.96 yr (9,115 days)
- Aphelion: 2.5138 AU
- Perihelion: 2.1982 AU
- Semi-major axis: 2.3560 AU
- Eccentricity: 0.0670
- Orbital period (sidereal): 3.62 yr (1,321 days)
- Mean anomaly: 183.85°
- Mean motion: 0° 16^{m} 21^{s} / day
- Inclination: 4.4688°
- Longitude of ascending node: 237.61°
- Argument of perihelion: 341.93°

Physical characteristics
- Mean diameter: 1.85 km (calculated)
- Synodic rotation period: 5.9389±0.0018 h
- Geometric albedo: 0.20 (assumed)
- Spectral type: S (assumed)
- Absolute magnitude (H): 15.6 · 15.92±0.23 · 15.575±0.010 (R) · 16.02

49777 Cappi (provisional designation 1999 XS) is a stony background asteroid from the inner regions of the asteroid belt, approximately 2 kilometers in diameter.

The asteroid was discovered on 2 December 1999, by Italian–American astronomer Paul Comba at the Prescott Observatory in Arizona, United States. It was named after the discoverer's wife, Margaret Capitola Sonntag Comba.

== Orbit and classification ==
Cappi is a non-family from the main belt's background population. It orbits the Sun in the inner asteroid belt at a distance of 2.2–2.5 AU once every 3 years and 7 months (1,321 days; semi-major axis of 2.36 AU). Its orbit has an eccentricity of 0.07 and an inclination of 4° with respect to the ecliptic.

The asteroid's observation arc begins 8 years prior to its official discovery observation, with a precovery taken by the Steward Observatory's Spacewatch survey at Kitt Peak in September 1991.

== Physical characteristics ==
Cappi is an assumed stony S-type asteroid.

=== Rotation and shape ===
In September 2013, a rotational lightcurve of Cappi was obtained from photometric observation taken in the R-band at the Palomar Transient Factory in California. It showed a rotation period of 5.9389 hours with a brightness amplitude of 0.78 magnitude (U=2), indicating a non-spheroidal shape.

=== Diameter and albedo estimate ===
The Collaborative Asteroid Lightcurve Link assumes a standard albedo for stony asteroids of 0.20 and calculates a diameter of 1.85 kilometers with an absolute magnitude of 16.02.

== Naming ==
This minor planet was named after Margaret Capitola Sonntag Comba (born 1940), a psychologist and art therapist by profession, faculty member at Prescott College, and wife of the discoverer. The approved naming citation was published by the Minor Planet Center on 4 May 2004 (M.P.C. 51981).
