= Zhu Jin (astronomer) =

Chinese astronomer

Zhu Jin 朱进
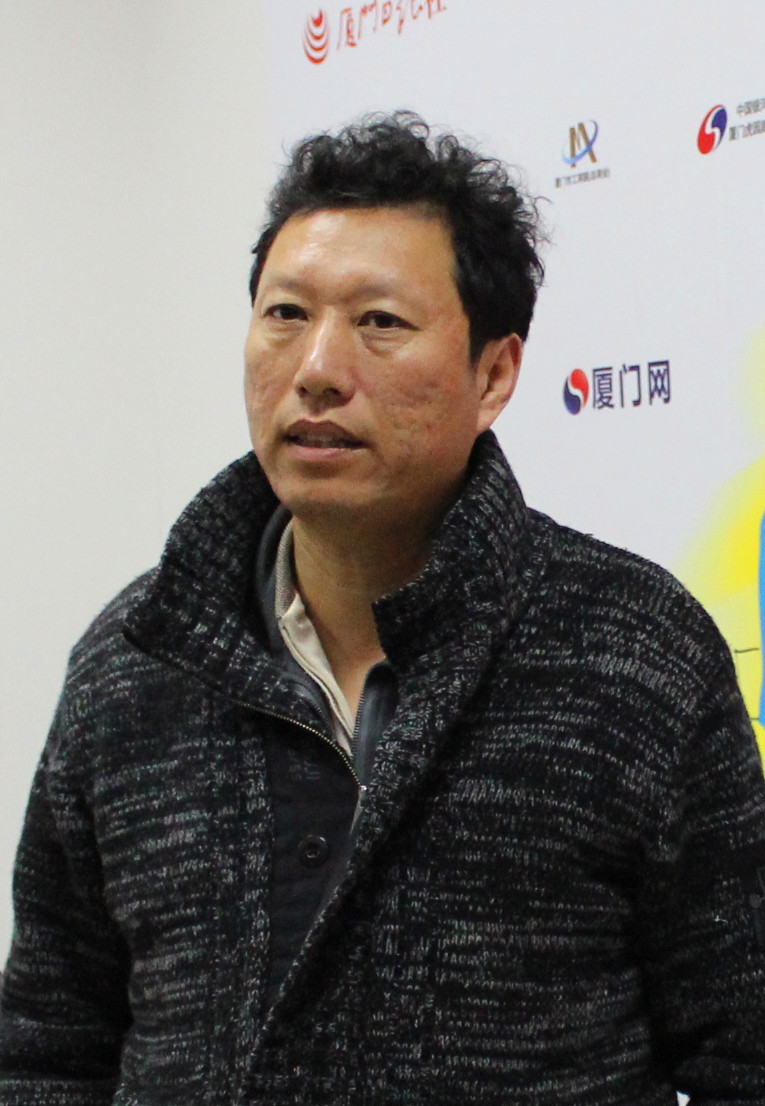
- Born: 24 April 1965 (age 61); Beijing, China
- Education: Beijing Normal University; Nanjing University
- Known for: Research of asteroids Science education
- Scientific career
- Fields: Astronomer
- Workplaces: Beijing Astronomical Observatory of Chinese Academy of Sciences; Beijing Planetarium; International Astronomical Union

Zhu Jin (simplified Chinese: 朱进; traditional Chinese: 朱進; pinyin: Zhū Jìn; born April 24, 1965) is a Chinese astronomer. He is the current curator of Beijing Planetarium.

== Early life ==
Zhu Jin was born on April 24, 1965, in Beijing, China, with his ancestral home in Lantian County, Shaanxi. He enrolled in the Department of Astronomy of Beijing Normal University and graduated in July, 1985. After that he continued studying astronomy in Nanjing University and got his Ph.D. in July, 1991. He worked as assistant researcher, associate professor and researcher in succession in Beijing Astronomical Observatory (now part of National Astronomical Observatory) of Chinese Academy of Sciences from July 1991 to September 2002, and especially as a postdoctoral researcher between May 1992 and April 1994. He moved to Beijing Planetarium in September 2002, since when working as curator.

== Academic achievements ==
Zhu Jin's major achievements in astronomy lies in the research of asteroids. He has been the host of the Beijing Schmidt CCD Asteroid Program since 1994, and by 2001, he had discovered 2728 asteroids which were given provisional designation, 1214 of them being eventually numbered and named permanently. In addition, his team discovered a comet on 3 June 1997, which was later named Zhu-Balam. He is also a member of Small Bodies Nomenclature of the International Astronomical Union.

== Science popularization ==
Zhu Jin is personally involved in the popularization of astronomy actively, and often organizes and gives lectures in Beijing Planetarium and other places in China. He also engages in astronomy popularization activities in chat shows on radio and television, and amateur astronomy activities specially organized for young people.

== Views on astrology ==
Zhu has spoken on the plausibility of astrology. During the "Dialogue between Astrology and Astronomy" held by the Beijing Planetarium on 19 June 2011, he questioned the theory of American astrologer David Railey for several times. He said with regard to astrology:

From the astronomical point of view, the permutations and combinations of the planets have no effects on our lives. Statistics have been made, from which no particular impact was found.

Zhu Jin voted in favor of the IAU definition of planet on the IAU General Assembly in August 2006, which removed Pluto from the list of planets.

== See also ==
- (in Chinese) Zhu Jin on Weibo (in Chinese)
