= Beijing Normal University =

Public research university in Beijing, China

Coordinates: 39°57′26″N 116°21′45″E

- 北京师范大学
- Seal of the university
- Motto: 学为人师、行为世范
- Motto in English: Learn, so as to instruct others; Act, to serve as example to all.
- Type: Public
- Established: 1902; 124 years ago
- Affiliations: BHUA, GHMUA
- President: Yu Jihong
- Party Secretary: Cheng Jianping
- Faculty: 2,637 (2025)
- Students: 38,718 (2025)
- Undergraduates: 16,543 (2025)
- Postgraduates: 22,175 (2025)
- Location: 19 Xinjiekouwai St, Haidian, Beijing, China
- Colours: Dark Blue; Light Blue
- Website: bnu.edu.cn; english.bnu.edu.cn

Chinese name
- Simplified Chinese: 北京师范大学
- Traditional Chinese: 北京師範大學
Transcriptions
Standard Mandarin
- Hanyu Pinyin: Běijīng Shīfàn Dàxué
- Bopomofo: ㄅㄟˇ ㄐㄧㄥ ㄕ ㄈㄢˋㄉㄚˋ ㄒㄩㄝˊ
- Wade–Giles: Pei^{3}-ching^{1} Shih^{1}-fan^{4} Ta^{4}-hsüeh^{2}
- Tongyong Pinyin: Běi-jing Shih-fàn Dà-syué
- IPA: [pèɪ.tɕíŋ ʂí.fân tâ.ɕɥě]
Yue: Cantonese
- Yale Romanization: Bākgīng Sīfaahn Daaihhohk
- Jyutping: bak1 ging1 si1 faan6 daai6 hok6
- IPA: [pɐk̚˥ kɪŋ˥ si˥ fan˨ taj˨ hɔk̚˨]

Abbreviation
- Chinese: 北师大
Transcriptions
Standard Mandarin
- Hanyu Pinyin: Běishīdà
- Bopomofo: ㄅㄟˇ ㄕ ㄉㄚˋ
- Wade–Giles: Pei^{3}-shih^{1}-ta^{4}
- Tongyong Pinyin: Běi-shī-dà
- IPA: [pèɪ ʂí tâ]

Beijing Normal University (BNU) (Chinese: 北京师范大学) is a public university in Haidian, Beijing, China. It is affiliated with the Ministry of Education of China, and co-funded by the Ministry of Education and the Beijing Municipal People's Government. It is a renowned institution of higher education known for teacher education, education science and basic learning in both the arts and the sciences. The university is part of Project 211, Project 985, and the Double First-Class Construction.

== History ==
Beijing Normal University (BNU) traces its origins to 1902, when the Department of Education of Imperial University of Peking (京师大学堂师范馆) was established under the decree of the Qing Dynasty Emperor. As the first institution in Chinese history dedicated primarily to teacher training and educational specialization, it laid the foundation for modern higher education in China. In 1908, the school became independent and was renamed the Supreme Education School of Peking (京师优级师范学堂).

By 1923, the institution had evolved into the National Beijing Normal University (国立北京师范大学校), marking the first use of the "Normal University" designation in China. A significant expansion occurred in 1931 when the Peking Women's Normal University (北平女子师范大学) merged with the university, then known as Peking Normal University (北平师范大学). Following the establishment of the People's Republic of China in 1949, the institution was renamed Beijing Normal University.

The university underwent further consolidation in 1952 when Fu Jen Catholic University was merged into BNU as part of a nationwide reorganization of higher education. Seven years later, in 1959, the Chinese Ministry of Education designated BNU as one of China's 20 National Key Universities.

In the late 20th and early 21st centuries, BNU strengthened its position through participation in major national initiatives. It was included in Project 211 (1996), a program aimed at enhancing around 100 universities for 21st-century development, and later in Project 985 (2002), which sought to elevate a select group of institutions to global prominence. The university gained international recognition in 2009 when The New York Times described it as "one of the most progressive institutions" in China.

BNU's academic standing was further solidified in 2017 when it was listed among China's Double First-Class Construction universities (comprising 36 institutions), with 11 of its disciplines ranking among the nation's best. That same year, BNU expanded its footprint by partnering with the Guangdong Provincial Government and Zhuhai Municipal Government to establish a new campus in Zhuhai. The BNU Zhuhai Campus received official approval from the Ministry of Education in April 2019.

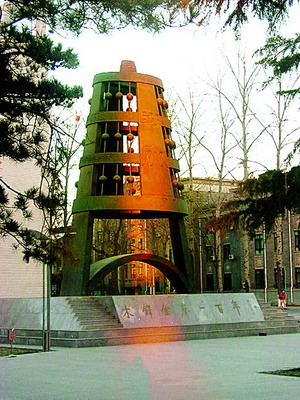
The Mu Duo Gilded Bell

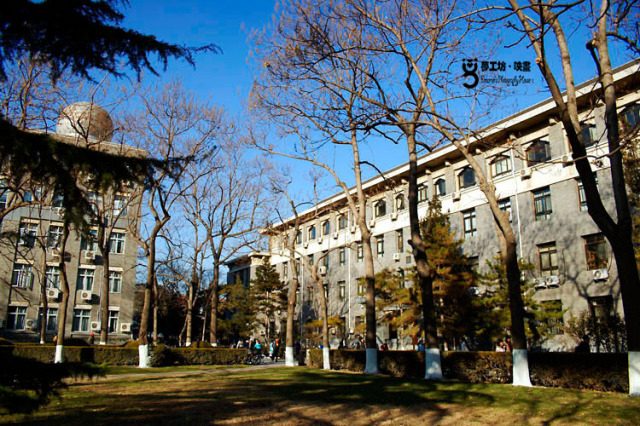
Beijing Campus View

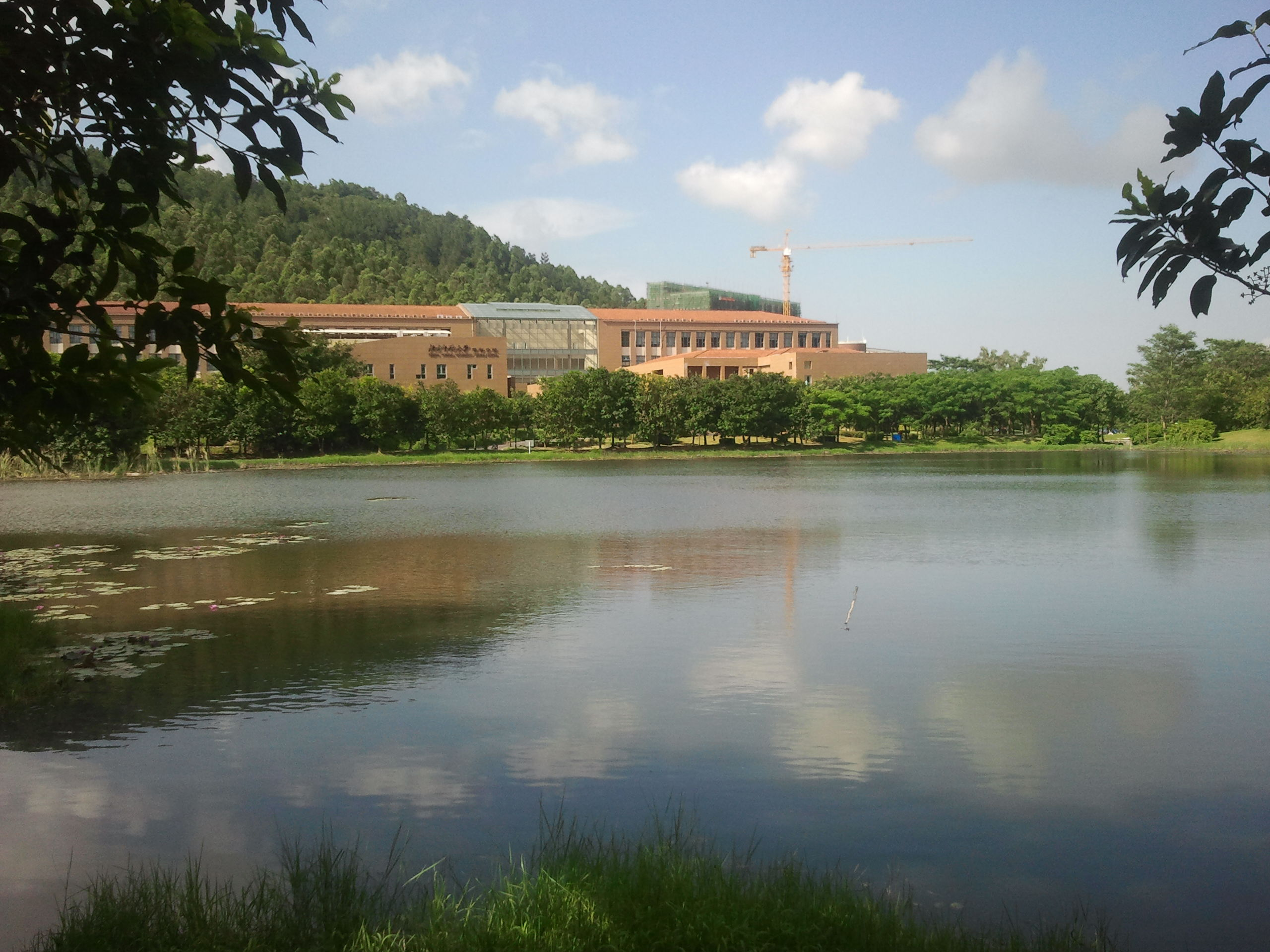
Zhuhai Campus View

== Academics ==
State Key Laboratories at Beijing Normal University
State Key Laboratory of Cognitive Neuroscience and Learning
State Key Laboratory of Earth Surface Processes and Resource Ecology

=== International collaboration ===
Beijing Normal University is part of a university consortium, including the University for Continuing Education Krems, Eötvös Loránd University, Hochschule Osnabrück University of Applied Sciences, Thapar Institute of Engineering and Technology and the University of Tampere, which offers an Erasmus+ joint master's degree and a Master in Research and Innovation in Higher Education.

Beijing Normal University was among the first Chinese institutions to accept international students. It is particularly popular for its Mandarin Chinese study programs. Among its most prestigious programs is Princeton in Beijing, a collaboration with Princeton University in the United States.

The university collaborates with the Singapore University of Social Sciences (SUSS) on SUSS's Master of Arts in Chinese Language and Literature.

Beijing Normal University is the seat of the BRICS Universities League Secretariat with BNU as a leading university in terms of BRICS higher education and academic cooperation.

=== Rankings and reputation ===
University rankings
| BCUR National | Domestic | 19 |
| Wu Shulian National | Domestic | 29 |
| CUAA National | Alumni | =14 |
| QS National | General | 10 |
| THE National | General | 10 |
| QS Asia (Asia version) | General | 61 |
| THE Asia (Asia version) | General | 26 |
| ARWU World | Research | 101–150 |
| QS World | General | 237 |
| THE World | General | 125 |
| USNWR World | General | 135 |

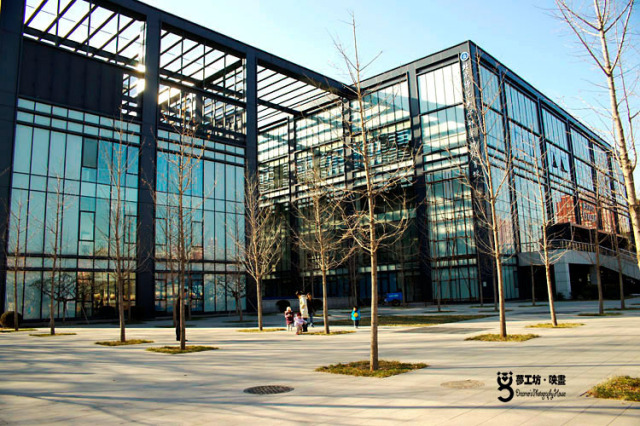
Gymnasium and Recreation Complex

As of 2025, BNU was ranked first in China, 2nd in the Asia-Pacific, and 7th in the world by the QS World University Rankings by Subjects for "Education and Training", which are historical strengths for the Faculty of Education that originated as a "normal university".

BNU is ranked 36th among the Global Top 100 Innovative Universities according to the World's Universities with Real Impacts (WURI) Ranking 2021.

As of 2026, Beijing Normal University is featured in the top 150 global universities as ranked by the Academic Ranking of World Universities, the Times Higher Education World University Rankings, and the U.S. News & World Report. Beijing Normal graduates are highly desired in China and worldwide; in 2017, its graduate employability rankings were placed in the global top 200+ universities with high-achieving graduates.

Internationally, Beijing Normal University was regarded as one of the most reputable Chinese universities by the Times Higher Education World Reputation Rankings, where it has ranked #126 globally.

- Academic Ranking of World Universities: 101-150th
- Times Higher Education World University Rankings: 125th worldwide, 26th in Asia and 10th in China
- U.S. News & World Report: #135 globally

== Campus ==
The main campus is in the Haidian District, with other Beijing campuses in the Changping District and Xicheng District as well as a campus in Zhuhai, Guangdong.

The original campus was near Hepingmen and Liulichang in the center of Beijing during the Republic of China period. After Fu Jen University merged with BNU the Fu Jen campus in Shichahai became the Northern Campus of BNU.

Beijing Normal University's current campus was built in 1954. It is located in central northwest Beijing in Haidian district between the second and third ring roads. It is the closest of all Haidian universities to Tiananmen Square.

Its campus hosted the U.S. Olympic Team during the 2008 Beijing Olympics.

== Notable alumni ==
- Mo Yan, writer, 2012 Nobel Prize in Literature laureate
- Liu Xiaobo, writer and dissident, 2010 Nobel Peace Prize laureate
- Su Tong, novelist
- Bi Shumin, writer
- Cao Shui, poet, novelist and screenwriter
- Xie Jun, chess grandmaster
- Zhu Jin, astronomer
- Lang Ping, gold medalist in 1984 Summer Olympics women's volleyball, and former head coach of the U.S. women's national volleyball team
- Chen Yibing, gymnast, 2008 Summer Olympics and 2012 Summer Olympics gold medalist
- Xu Jialu, professor of Chinese, politician, and former vice chairman of the National People's Congress
- Yuan Guiren, professor of philosophy, and the former Minister of Education of the People's Republic of China
- Chen Zongxing, a Chinese male politician, who served as the vice chairperson of the Chinese People's Political Consultative Conference.
- Liu Bin, a Chinese official who previously served as the National Chief Educational Inspector
- Yu Dan, professor well known for her popular and controversial lectures about the Analects broadcast on China Central Television
- Wang Dezhao or Ouang Te Tchao, prominent Chinese physicist, academician of the Chinese Academy of Sciences, student of French physicist Paul Langevin and founder of underwater acoustics in China, Officier of the French National Order of the Legion of Honour.
- Wang Xiaodong, elected member of the United States National Academy of Sciences, former biochemist at the University of Texas Southwestern Medical Center, and currently Director and Investigator at the National Institute of Biological Sciences, Beijing (NIBS, Beijing)
- Liang Jun, teacher and women's rights activist
- Li Peng, a Chinese physiologist who is a professor at Tsinghua University, and currently president of Zhengzhou University.
- Chang Kai, a Chinese physicist currently serving as research fellow at the Institute of Semiconductors, Chinese Academy of Sciences (CAS).
- Ayouduo, Chinese singer
- Timothy Geithner, 75th United States Secretary of the Treasury. He attended as a language student studying Mandarin in 1982 as an undergraduate at Dartmouth College.
- Kirsten Gillibrand, United States Senator from New York. She attended as an undergraduate in Dartmouth College's FSP program.
- Connie Britton, actress. She also attended as a language student in Dartmouth College's FSP program and was the roommate of Kirsten Gillibrand.

== Affiliated high schools ==
- Experimental High School Attached to Beijing Normal University
- The High School Affiliated to Beijing Normal University
- The Second High School Attached to Beijing Normal University

== See also ==
- List of universities in China
