= Beijing Observatory =

Beijing Observatory or Peking Observatory may refer to:

- Beijing Ancient Observatory, the dynasty astronomical observatory for the Ming and Qing dynasties
- Beijing Astronomical Observatory, the post-Communist revolution observatory
- Beijing Planetarium

== See also ==
- National Astronomical Observatory of China, headquartered in Beijing
