= Liu Bin =

Liu Bin is the name of:

- Liu Bin (Southern Han) (920–943), Southern Han emperor
- Liu Bin (footballer, born 1991), Chinese footballer
- Liu Bin (footballer, born 1998), Chinese footballer
- Liu Bin (politician, born 1937) (Chinese: 柳斌), Deputy Director of the National Board of Education.

== See also ==
- Liu Bing (disambiguation)
