= Beijing Schmidt CCD Asteroid Program =

1990s astronomical survey in China

Minor planets discovered: 1293
see § List of discovered minor planets

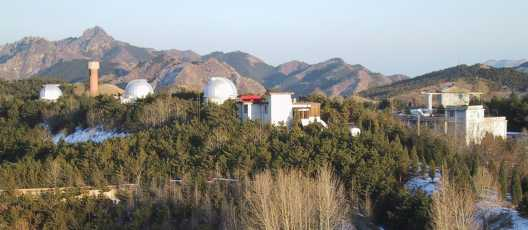
SCAP was conducted at BAO's Xinglong Station, China, in the 1990s.

The Beijing Schmidt CCD Asteroid Program (SCAP) was an astronomical survey to search for near-Earth objects. It was conducted during the 1990s, at the Xinglong Station in Xinglong County, Chengde, Hebei province, China and resulted in the discovery of more than a thousand numbered minor planets.

Funded by the Chinese Academy of Sciences, the survey is sometimes also called BAO Schmidt CCD Asteroid Program and NAOC Schmidt CCD Asteroid Program, referring to the Beijing Astronomical Observatory (BAO) and National Astronomical Observatory of China (NAOC), respectively.

The instrument that SCAP used to detect near-Earth objects was a 60/90 cm Schmidt telescope. Equipped with a 2048×2048 CCD camera, this telescope was installed at the BAO Xinglong station in Hebei province, China.

In a conversation with Space.com contributor Michael Paine, SCAP head Jin Zhu said that the program's allotted time to use the Schmidt telescope was significantly reduced to make room for the observatory's other projects.

== Discoveries ==
From 1995 to 1999, SCAP detected one new comet and 2460 new asteroids and observed 43860 other asteroids, making it the fifth largest asteroid observation project at that time. Five of the asteroids it discovered were NEAs, two of which were considered potentially hazardous asteroids (PHAs). In 2002, an NEA was discovered near Earth's moon.

=== Notable objects ===
Name	Provisional designation	Discovery date	Remarks	Ref
7072 Beijingdaxue	1996 CB8	February 3, 1996	asteroid named after Peking University	MPC
7800 Zhongkeyuan	1996 EW2	March 11, 1996	asteroid named after the Chinese Academy of Sciences	MPC
13651	1997 BR	January 20, 1997	first potentially hazardous asteroid (PHA) discovered by SCAP	MPC
29552 Chern	1998 CS2	February 15, 1998	asteroid named after the Chinese mathematician Chern Shiing-shen	MPC
31065 Beishizhang	1996 TZ13	October 10, 1996	asteroid	MPC
136849	1998 CS1	February 9, 1998	potentially hazardous asteroid (PHA)	MPC
Zhu-Balam	C/1997 L1	June 3, 1997	comet named after SCAP head Jin Zhu and co-discoverer Dave Balam (Univ. of Victoria)	MPC

=== List of discovered minor planets ===
7072 Beijingdaxue	3 February 1996	list
7145 Linzexu	7 June 1996	list
(7310) 1995 OL1	19 July 1995	list
7494 Xiwanggongcheng	28 October 1995	list
7497 Guangcaishiye	17 December 1995	list
7681 Chenjingrun	24 December 1996	list
7683 Wuwenjun	19 February 1997	list
(7795) 1996 AN15	14 January 1996	list
(7798) 1996 CL	1 February 1996	list
7800 Zhongkeyuan	11 March 1996	list
8050 Beishida	18 September 1996	list
8117 Yuanlongping	18 September 1996	list
(8118) 1996 WG3	26 November 1996	list
(8119) 1997 TP25	12 October 1997	list
(8227) 1996 VD4	8 November 1996	list
(8228) 1996 YB2	22 December 1996	list
8311 Zhangdaning	3 October 1996	list
8313 Christiansen	19 December 1996	list
8315 Bajin	25 November 1997	list
8412 Zhaozhongxian	7 October 1996	list
8423 Macao	11 January 1997	list
8425 Zirankexuejijin	14 February 1997	list
(8426) 1997 ST	16 September 1997	list
(8429) 1997 YK4	23 December 1997	list
(8562) 1995 SK53	28 September 1995	list

(8584) 1997 AN22	11 January 1997	list
(8916) 1996 CC	1 February 1996	list
8917 Tianjindaxue	9 March 1996	list
(8918) 1996 OR1	20 July 1996	list
8919 Ouyangziyuan	9 October 1996	list
(8928) 1996 YH2	23 December 1996	list
(8948) 1997 CW27	6 February 1997	list
(8949) 1997 CM28	13 February 1997	list
(8950) 1997 EG46	15 March 1997	list
(8951) 1997 FO	19 March 1997	list
9092 Nanyang	4 November 1995	list
(9120) 1998 DR8	22 February 1998	list
9221 Wuliangyong	2 December 1995	list
(9440) 1997 FZ1	29 March 1997	list
9442 Beiligong	2 April 1997	list
9668 Tianyahaijiao	3 June 1997	list
(9794) 1996 FO5	25 March 1996	list
(9805) 1997 NZ	1 July 1997	list
(9806) 1997 NR6	10 July 1997	list
(10192) 1996 OQ1	20 July 1996	list
10388 Zhuguangya	25 December 1996	list
(10396) 1997 SW33	17 September 1997	list
(10397) 1997 SX33	17 September 1997	list
10410 Yangguanghua	4 December 1997	list
(10411) 1997 XO11	15 December 1997	list

(10422) 1999 AN22	14 January 1999	list
(10594) 1996 RE4	10 September 1996	list
(10595) 1996 SS6	21 September 1996	list
(10603) 1996 UF4	29 October 1996	list
10611 Yanjici	23 January 1997	list
(10632) 1998 CV1	1 February 1998	list
(10869) 1996 SJ4	21 September 1996	list
(10893) 1997 SB10	19 September 1997	list
(10902) 1997 WB22	25 November 1997	list
10911 Ziqiangbuxi	19 December 1997	list
(10915) 1997 YU16	29 December 1997	list
10929 Chenfangyun	1 February 1998	list
10930 Jinyong	6 February 1998	list
(10946) 1999 HR2	16 April 1999	list
11139 Qingdaoligong	22 December 1996	list
(11143) 1997 BF7	28 January 1997	list
(11164) 1998 DW2	17 February 1998	list
11351 Leucus	12 October 1997	list
(11355) 1997 XL11	15 December 1997	list
(11630) 1996 VY38	7 November 1996	list
11637 Yangjiachi	24 December 1996	list
(11643) 1997 AM22	8 January 1997	list
(11655) 1997 CC29	7 February 1997	list
(11979) 1995 SS5	25 September 1995	list
(12018) 1996 XJ15	10 December 1996	list

(12029) 1997 AQ22	11 January 1997	list
(12043) 1997 FN	22 March 1997	list
(12048) 1997 GW29	2 April 1997	list
(12105) 1998 KA10	25 May 1998	list
12418 Tongling	23 October 1995	list
(12430) 1995 XB2	14 December 1995	list
(12454) 1996 YO1	18 December 1996	list
(12480) 1997 EW45	9 March 1997	list
(12483) 1997 FW1	28 March 1997	list
(12558) 1998 QV63	31 August 1998	list
(12563) 1998 SA43	20 September 1998	list
(12795) 1995 VA2	11 November 1995	list
(12821) 1996 RG1	10 September 1996	list
(12827) 1997 AS7	5 January 1997	list
(12839) 1997 FB2	29 March 1997	list
12935 Zhengzhemin	2 October 1999	list
(13195) 1997 CG6	2 February 1997	list
(13215) 1997 JT16	3 May 1997	list
(13299) 1998 RU15	4 September 1998	list
(13300) 1998 RF16	14 September 1998	list
13651 Wugang	20 January 1997	list
(13656) 1997 EX45	15 March 1997	list
(13683) 1997 PV3	8 August 1997	list
(13702) 1998 OE7	28 July 1998	list
(13746) 1998 SR43	25 September 1998	list

(13747) 1998 SS43	25 September 1998	list
(13754) 1998 SB63	25 September 1998	list
(13780) 1998 UZ8	17 October 1998	list
(13790) 1998 UF31	17 October 1998	list
(13823) 1999 VO72	15 November 1999	list
(14045) 1995 VW1	4 November 1995	list
(14058) 1996 AP15	14 January 1996	list
(14073) 1996 KO1	17 May 1996	list
(14076) 1996 OO1	20 July 1996	list
(14089) 1997 JC14	8 May 1997	list
(14101) 1997 SD1	19 September 1997	list
(14125) 1998 QT62	27 August 1998	list
14147 Wenlingshuguang	23 September 1998	list
(14512) 1996 GL1	6 April 1996	list
(14538) 1997 RR8	12 September 1997	list
(14540) 1997 RJ10	13 September 1997	list
(14546) 1997 TM18	3 October 1997	list
(14548) 1997 TJ24	5 October 1997	list
(14552) 1997 UX20	24 October 1997	list
14558 Wangganchang	19 November 1997	list
(14562) 1997 YQ19	27 December 1997	list
(14625) 1998 UH31	18 October 1998	list
(14652) 1998 YT8	17 December 1998	list
(14655) 1998 YJ22	21 December 1998	list
14656 Lijiang	29 December 1998	list

(14943) 1995 VD19	15 November 1995	list
(14952) 1996 CQ	1 February 1996	list
15001 Fuzhou	21 November 1997	list
(15040) 1998 XC	1 December 1998	list
(15067) 1999 AM9	10 January 1999	list
(15373) 1996 WV1	20 November 1996	list
(15377) 1997 KW	31 May 1997	list
(15393) 1997 TR24	9 October 1997	list
(15394) 1997 TQ25	12 October 1997	list
(15404) 1997 VE8	6 November 1997	list
(15411) 1997 YL1	18 December 1997	list
(15416) 1998 DZ2	21 February 1998	list
(15426) 1998 SW43	26 September 1998	list
(15430) 1998 UR31	22 October 1998	list
(15431) 1998 UQ32	30 October 1998	list
(15437) 1998 VS35	9 November 1998	list
(15445) 1998 XE	1 December 1998	list
(15877) 1996 WZ1	24 November 1996	list
15882 Dingzhong	7 February 1997	list
(15900) 1997 RK3	3 September 1997	list
(15901) 1997 RY8	12 September 1997	list
(15912) 1997 TR26	13 October 1997	list
(15961) 1998 CC1	4 February 1998	list
(15962) 1998 CM2	15 February 1998	list
(16045) 1999 HU2	22 April 1999	list

(16096) 1999 US6	29 October 1999	list
(16738) 1996 KQ1	19 May 1996	list
(16739) 1996 KX2	24 May 1996	list
16757 Luoxiahong	18 September 1996	list
(16758) 1996 TR1	3 October 1996	list
(16763) 1996 TG12	3 October 1996	list
(16772) 1996 UC4	29 October 1996	list
(16784) 1996 YD2	22 December 1996	list
(16799) 1997 JU7	3 May 1997	list
(16803) 1997 SU10	26 September 1997	list
(16806) 1997 SB34	17 September 1997	list
(16818) 1997 UL24	28 October 1997	list
(16824) 1997 VA8	6 November 1997	list
(16825) 1997 VC8	6 November 1997	list
(16833) 1997 WX21	19 November 1997	list
(16850) 1997 YS1	20 December 1997	list
(16851) 1997 YU1	21 December 1997	list
(16854) 1997 YL3	20 December 1997	list
(16860) 1997 YT10	22 December 1997	list
(16896) 1998 DS9	20 February 1998	list
(16913) 1998 EK9	11 March 1998	list
(16966) 1998 SM63	29 September 1998	list
16982 Tsinghua	10 January 1999	list
(17157) 1999 KP6	21 May 1999	list
(17187) 1999 VM72	14 November 1999	list

17606 Wumengchao	28 September 1995	list
(17623) 1995 WO42	30 November 1995	list
(17635) 1996 OC1	20 July 1996	list
(17641) 1996 SW7	18 September 1996	list
(17650) 1996 UH5	29 October 1996	list
(17680) 1997 AW5	1 January 1997	list
(17692) 1997 CX27	6 February 1997	list
17693 Wangdaheng	15 February 1997	list
(17705) 1997 UM24	28 October 1997	list
(17707) 1997 VM7	2 November 1997	list
(17721) 1997 XT10	10 December 1997	list
(17722) 1997 YT1	21 December 1997	list
(17723) 1997 YA4	22 December 1997	list
(17726) 1997 YS10	22 December 1997	list
(17747) 1998 BJ42	26 January 1998	list
(17754) 1998 DN8	21 February 1998	list
(17765) 1998 EZ2	1 March 1998	list
(18492) 1996 GS2	8 April 1996	list
(18511) 1996 SH4	19 September 1996	list
(18518) 1996 VT3	2 November 1996	list
(18519) 1996 VH4	8 November 1996	list
(18523) 1996 VA7	2 November 1996	list
(18528) 1996 VX30	2 November 1996	list
18529 Liangdongcai	28 November 1996	list
(18536) 1996 XN15	10 December 1996	list

18550 Maoyisheng	9 January 1997	list
(18582) 1997 XK9	4 December 1997	list
(18592) 1997 YO18	24 December 1997	list
18593 Wangzhongcheng	5 January 1998	list
18639 Aoyunzhiyuanzhe	5 March 1998	list
(18640) 1998 EF9	7 March 1998	list
(18691) 1998 HE1	17 April 1998	list
(18763) 1999 JV2	8 May 1999	list
19258 Gongyi	24 March 1995	list
(19266) 1995 TF1	14 October 1995	list
19282 Zhangcunhao	14 January 1996	list
19298 Zhongkeda	20 September 1996	list
19300 Xinglong	18 September 1996	list
(19301) 1996 SF8	21 September 1996	list
(19332) 1996 YQ1	18 December 1996	list
(19333) 1996 YT1	19 December 1996	list
(19334) 1996 YV1	19 December 1996	list
(19343) 1997 AR7	5 January 1997	list
(19344) 1997 AD14	2 January 1997	list
(19350) 1997 CU28	6 February 1997	list
19366 Sudingqiang	6 November 1997	list
(19385) 1998 CE4	13 February 1998	list
(20105) 1995 OS1	19 July 1995	list
(20132) 1996 BK13	21 January 1996	list
(20134) 1996 GT2	8 April 1996	list

(20145) 1996 SS4	20 September 1996	list
(20147) 1996 SV7	18 September 1996	list
(20150) 1996 TJ6	5 October 1996	list
(20179) 1996 XX31	12 December 1996	list
(20181) 1996 YC2	22 December 1996	list
(20198) 1997 CL28	13 February 1997	list
(20209) 1997 FE5	30 March 1997	list
(20216) 1997 GS27	9 April 1997	list
(20233) 1998 AZ6	5 January 1998	list
(20247) 1998 EB9	2 March 1998	list
(20248) 1998 EE10	2 March 1998	list
(20253) 1998 EJ21	1 March 1998	list
(20261) 1998 FM12	19 March 1998	list
(21272) 1996 SA1	18 September 1996	list
(21274) 1996 SG4	19 September 1996	list
(21278) 1996 TG6	5 October 1996	list
21313 Xiuyanyu	10 December 1996	list
(21314) 1996 XG15	10 December 1996	list
(21318) 1996 XU26	8 December 1996	list
(21319) 1996 XX26	8 December 1996	list
(21324) 1997 AY5	2 January 1997	list
(21325) 1997 AB6	2 January 1997	list
(21332) 1997 BX	18 January 1997	list
(21342) 1997 CS28	4 February 1997	list
(21345) 1997 ED3	3 March 1997	list

(21347) 1997 EO11	3 March 1997	list
(21353) 1997 FG	19 March 1997	list
(21354) 1997 FM	21 March 1997	list
(21365) 1997 JS7	3 May 1997	list
(21377) 1998 CO1	6 February 1998	list
(21382) 1998 EB8	2 March 1998	list
(21383) 1998 EC9	2 March 1998	list
(21384) 1998 EB10	1 March 1998	list
(21808) 1999 TR18	14 October 1999	list
(21872) 1999 UP3	18 October 1999	list
(21874) 1999 UB6	18 October 1999	list
(21875) 1999 UD6	22 October 1999	list
(21934) 1999 VY71	7 November 1999	list
(22420) 1995 WL42	28 November 1995	list
(22457) 1996 XC15	10 December 1996	list
(22464) 1997 AG14	4 January 1997	list
(22471) 1997 CR28	2 February 1997	list
(22472) 1997 CT28	6 February 1997	list
(22476) 1997 EM23	8 March 1997	list
(22479) 1997 FY1	29 March 1997	list
(22501) 1997 PR3	5 August 1997	list
(22502) 1997 SW	16 September 1997	list
(22654) 1998 QA5	22 August 1998	list
(22743) 1998 TD18	13 October 1998	list
(22748) 1998 UW8	17 October 1998	list

(23585) 1995 SD53	28 September 1995	list
(23624) 1996 UX3	29 October 1996	list
(23637) 1997 AM6	4 January 1997	list
(23657) 1997 CB28	6 February 1997	list
(23658) 1997 CC28	6 February 1997	list
23686 Songyuan	8 May 1997	list
(23690) 1997 JD14	9 May 1997	list
23692 Nandatianwenners	20 May 1997	list
(23698) 1997 NA3	4 July 1997	list
23701 Liqibin	3 August 1997	list
(23704) 1997 SD10	23 September 1997	list
(23708) 1997 TR18	5 October 1997	list
(23794) 1998 QG29	22 August 1998	list
(23901) 1998 SU62	25 September 1998	list
(23973) 1999 CA4	5 February 1999	list
(24136) 1999 VL72	14 November 1999	list
24414 Anzhenhosp	13 January 2000	list
(24824) 1995 GL7	4 April 1995	list
(24832) 1995 SU5	25 September 1995	list
(24836) 1995 TO1	14 October 1995	list
(24883) 1996 VG9	13 November 1996	list
(24902) 1997 AR22	11 January 1997	list
(24903) 1997 AS22	11 January 1997	list
(24909) 1997 CY28	7 February 1997	list
(24920) 1997 EE23	2 March 1997	list

(24924) 1997 EY45	15 March 1997	list
(24925) 1997 FW	18 March 1997	list
(24955) 1997 SK10	26 September 1997	list
24956 Qiannan	26 September 1997	list
(24961) 1997 TO24	8 October 1997	list
(24964) 1997 UY20	27 October 1997	list
(25011) 1998 PP1	13 August 1998	list
(25030) 1998 QL29	22 August 1998	list
(25057) 1998 QW62	30 August 1998	list
(25132) 1998 SO9	17 September 1998	list
(25141) 1998 SC27	20 September 1998	list
(25144) 1998 SC43	23 September 1998	list
(25145) 1998 SH43	23 September 1998	list
25146 Xiada	24 September 1998	list
25240 Qiansanqiang	16 October 1998	list
(25254) 1998 UM32	29 October 1998	list
(25313) 1998 YV8	22 December 1998	list
(25315) 1999 AZ8	9 January 1999	list
(25419) 1999 VC72	11 November 1999	list
(26178) 1996 GV2	11 April 1996	list
(26187) 1996 XA27	12 December 1996	list
26188 Zengqingcun	22 December 1996	list
(26196) 1997 EF46	9 March 1997	list
(26203) 1997 KS	31 May 1997	list
(26211) 1997 RR9	13 September 1997	list

(26212) 1997 TG26	11 October 1997	list
(26225) 1997 YO14	24 December 1997	list
(26228) 1998 OZ6	20 July 1998	list
(26229) 1998 OG7	28 July 1998	list
(26262) 1998 RW15	14 September 1998	list
(26263) 1998 RC16	14 September 1998	list
(26281) 1998 ST43	25 September 1998	list
(26384) 1999 QP2	31 August 1999	list
(26913) 1996 JF2	11 May 1996	list
(26949) 1997 JV7	3 May 1997	list
(26966) 1997 RL3	4 September 1997	list
(26976) 1997 TF26	11 October 1997	list
(26978) 1997 UZ4	20 October 1997	list
(26987) 1997 WP1	21 November 1997	list
(26996) 1997 YH3	16 December 1997	list
(27006) 1998 EX7	2 March 1998	list
(27128) 1998 WB25	28 November 1998	list
(27156) 1998 YK22	21 December 1998	list
27895 Yeduzheng	6 June 1996	list
(27904) 1996 SV4	20 September 1996	list
(27905) 1996 SK6	20 September 1996	list
(27910) 1996 TA14	10 October 1996	list
(27911) 1996 TC14	10 October 1996	list
(27916) 1996 VX1	1 November 1996	list
(27929) 1997 FC1	28 March 1997	list

(27953) 1997 PF5	11 August 1997	list
(27957) 1997 RV8	12 September 1997	list
27966 Changguang	16 September 1997	list
(27973) 1997 TR25	12 October 1997	list
(27980) 1997 UA21	27 October 1997	list
(27981) 1997 UK21	20 October 1997	list
(27992) 1997 VR7	2 November 1997	list
(27994) 1997 WM1	19 November 1997	list
(28011) 1997 YW3	22 December 1997	list
(28012) 1997 YH4	23 December 1997	list
(28013) 1997 YL4	24 December 1997	list
(28018) 1998 AG	4 January 1998	list
(28026) 1998 CN1	6 February 1998	list
(28028) 1998 DS8	22 February 1998	list
(28033) 1998 EE9	5 March 1998	list
(28113) 1998 SD43	23 September 1998	list
(28114) 1998 SE43	23 September 1998	list
(28145) 1998 TY18	14 October 1998	list
(28241) 1999 AC22	10 January 1999	list
28242 Mingantu	6 January 1999	list
28468 Shichangxu	12 January 2000	list
(29354) 1995 OR1	19 July 1995	list
(29396) 1996 PM3	6 August 1996	list
(29398) 1996 RM5	15 September 1996	list
(29399) 1996 RO5	15 September 1996	list

(29403) 1996 TO13	5 October 1996	list
(29411) 1996 WQ2	20 November 1996	list
(29412) 1996 WJ3	27 November 1996	list
(29417) 1996 XR26	6 December 1996	list
(29426) 1997 CH28	11 February 1997	list
29438 Zhengjia	26 June 1997	list
(29459) 1997 SO16	29 September 1997	list
(29461) 1997 SP32	30 September 1997	list
29467 Shandongdaxue	15 October 1997	list
(29485) 1997 VE7	2 November 1997	list
(29486) 1997 VG7	2 November 1997	list
(29487) 1997 VU8	14 November 1997	list
(29509) 1997 YK1	17 December 1997	list
(29511) 1997 YP3	21 December 1997	list
(29527) 1998 AY6	5 January 1998	list
(29548) 1998 BC42	19 January 1998	list
(29551) 1998 CH1	5 February 1998	list
29552 Chern	15 February 1998	list
(29623) 1998 SR164	30 September 1998	list
(29630) 1998 UN32	29 October 1998	list
(29667) 1998 XF	1 December 1998	list
(29704) 1998 YB9	23 December 1998	list
(30982) 1995 SP5	21 September 1995	list
30991 Minenze	28 September 1995	list
(31009) 1996 CP	1 February 1996	list

(31011) 1996 CG7	2 February 1996	list
(31012) 1996 CG8	10 February 1996	list
(31057) 1996 SK4	21 September 1996	list
(31060) 1996 TB6	3 October 1996	list
31065 Beishizhang	10 October 1996	list
(31068) 1996 TT54	9 October 1996	list
(31074) 1996 WY1	24 November 1996	list
(31088) 1997 BV	18 January 1997	list
(31093) 1997 CE28	6 February 1997	list
(31094) 1997 CN28	14 February 1997	list
(31107) 1997 PS3	5 August 1997	list
(31108) 1997 PW3	10 August 1997	list
(31115) 1997 QF4	28 August 1997	list
(31118) 1997 RN1	1 September 1997	list
(31120) 1997 RT8	12 September 1997	list
(31121) 1997 RD10	13 September 1997	list
(31123) 1997 SU	16 September 1997	list
31129 Langyatai	26 September 1997	list
(31130) 1997 SS10	26 September 1997	list
(31131) 1997 SV10	28 September 1997	list
(31137) 1997 SQ32	30 September 1997	list
(31138) 1997 SJ33	29 September 1997	list
(31141) 1997 TN18	3 October 1997	list
(31143) 1997 TN24	8 October 1997	list
(31150) 1997 UT20	23 October 1997	list

(31157) 1997 WK1	19 November 1997	list
(31177) 1997 XH11	13 December 1997	list
(31180) 1997 YX3	22 December 1997	list
(31181) 1997 YY3	22 December 1997	list
(31182) 1997 YZ3	22 December 1997	list
(31194) 1997 YQ16	24 December 1997	list
(31195) 1997 YG18	29 December 1997	list
(31211) 1998 BW8	18 January 1998	list
(31212) 1998 BZ8	18 January 1998	list
31230 Tuyouyou	18 January 1998	list
(31233) 1998 CG1	1 February 1998	list
(31243) 1998 DW10	16 February 1998	list
(31256) 1998 DM32	22 February 1998	list
(31259) 1998 EB3	1 March 1998	list
(31261) 1998 EF8	2 March 1998	list
(31262) 1998 ES8	5 March 1998	list
(31263) 1998 EG9	8 March 1998	list
(31373) 1998 XN12	14 December 1998	list
(31411) 1999 AU9	10 January 1999	list
(31443) 1999 CL2	5 February 1999	list
(31652) 1999 HS2	21 April 1999	list
32928 Xiejialin	20 August 1995	list
(32950) 1996 CA1	10 February 1996	list
(32978) 1996 VG7	9 November 1996	list
(32979) 1996 VH7	9 November 1996	list

(32982) 1996 VD38	2 November 1996	list
(32983) 1996 WU2	27 November 1996	list
(32994) 1997 AT21	11 January 1997	list
(32999) 1997 CY27	6 February 1997	list
33000 Chenjiansheng	11 February 1997	list
(33013) 1997 FZ	28 March 1997	list
(33016) 1997 GZ31	13 April 1997	list
(33023) 1997 PJ3	3 August 1997	list
(33024) 1997 PD5	11 August 1997	list
(33025) 1997 PV5	3 August 1997	list
(33032) 1997 RQ8	12 September 1997	list
(33033) 1997 RA10	12 September 1997	list
(33036) 1997 ST10	26 September 1997	list
(33042) 1997 TU18	6 October 1997	list
(33048) 1997 UX4	20 October 1997	list
(33062) 1997 VT2	1 November 1997	list
(33068) 1997 WO1	21 November 1997	list
(33089) 1997 XK11	15 December 1997	list
(33090) 1997 XT11	13 December 1997	list
(33092) 1997 YR1	20 December 1997	list
(33102) 1997 YJ11	22 December 1997	list
(33108) 1997 YJ18	21 December 1997	list
(33132) 1998 CD4	13 February 1998	list
(33139) 1998 DU2	16 February 1998	list
(33145) 1998 DK8	21 February 1998	list

(33146) 1998 DL8	21 February 1998	list
(33166) 1998 EV8	5 March 1998	list
(33167) 1998 EJ9	11 March 1998	list
(33168) 1998 ED10	2 March 1998	list
(33176) 1998 FN12	20 March 1998	list
(33291) 1998 KP9	20 May 1998	list
(33375) 1999 CD4	9 February 1999	list
(33477) 1999 FR59	27 March 1999	list
(35213) 1994 RF25	12 September 1994	list
(35232) 1995 GS7	4 April 1995	list
(35238) 1995 QR1	20 August 1995	list
(35243) 1995 TZ1	14 October 1995	list
(35281) 1996 SD6	18 September 1996	list
(35282) 1996 SC7	21 September 1996	list
(35294) 1996 UG4	29 October 1996	list
(35296) 1996 VY1	1 November 1996	list
(35297) 1996 VS3	2 November 1996	list
(35309) 1996 YF3	24 December 1996	list
35313 Hangtianyuan	2 January 1997	list
(35317) 1997 AQ23	14 January 1997	list
(35318) 1997 BD1	25 January 1997	list
(35359) 1997 SO33	26 September 1997	list
(35360) 1997 TY11	7 October 1997	list
(35361) 1997 TH26	11 October 1997	list
(35362) 1997 TZ26	7 October 1997	list

35366 Kaifeng	18 October 1997	list
(35372) 1997 UN24	28 October 1997	list
(35399) 1997 YQ1	20 December 1997	list
(35402) 1997 YK3	17 December 1997	list
(35411) 1997 YX16	29 December 1997	list
(35414) 1998 AC3	3 January 1998	list
(35415) 1998 AD3	3 January 1998	list
(35421) 1998 AO6	4 January 1998	list
(35422) 1998 AF7	5 January 1998	list
(35443) 1998 BG42	20 January 1998	list
(35460) 1998 DU20	26 February 1998	list
(35463) 1998 DJ32	22 February 1998	list
(35470) 1998 EC8	2 March 1998	list
(35471) 1998 ED8	2 March 1998	list
(35472) 1998 EJ8	2 March 1998	list
(35483) 1998 FQ12	20 March 1998	list
(35627) 1998 KW9	24 May 1998	list
(35657) 1998 QE5	22 August 1998	list
(36242) 1999 VX71	5 November 1999	list
(37682) 1995 GZ6	4 April 1995	list
(37703) 1996 CD1	11 February 1996	list
(37718) 1996 SR4	20 September 1996	list
(37719) 1996 SG6	18 September 1996	list
(37730) 1996 TA55	10 October 1996	list
(37731) 1996 TY64	5 October 1996	list

(37750) 1997 BZ	19 January 1997	list
(37792) 1997 VQ7	2 November 1997	list
(37801) 1997 WO47	19 November 1997	list
(37804) 1997 YE4	23 December 1997	list
(37813) 1998 AM6	4 January 1998	list
(37814) 1998 AT6	4 January 1998	list
(37837) 1998 CA2	9 February 1998	list
(37852) 1998 DG32	22 February 1998	list
(38079) 1999 HF	16 April 1999	list
(38529) 1999 UR6	29 October 1999	list
(39640) 1995 GB7	4 April 1995	list
(39695) 1996 SJ6	18 September 1996	list
(39719) 1996 VF4	8 November 1996	list
(39720) 1996 VG4	8 November 1996	list
(39725) 1996 VA31	2 November 1996	list
(39727) 1996 VD39	7 November 1996	list
(39735) 1996 YY1	20 December 1996	list
(39742) 1997 AQ7	5 January 1997	list
(39746) 1997 BW	18 January 1997	list
(39762) 1997 FE1	29 March 1997	list
(39775) 1997 GB30	13 April 1997	list
(39797) 1997 TK18	3 October 1997	list
(39815) 1997 XU9	4 December 1997	list
(39816) 1997 XE11	10 December 1997	list
(39821) 1998 AH7	5 January 1998	list

(39860) 1998 DY7	17 February 1998	list
(39861) 1998 DO8	21 February 1998	list
(39862) 1998 DX10	17 February 1998	list
(39878) 1998 EH8	2 March 1998	list
(40032) 1998 KD10	26 May 1998	list
(40138) 1998 QF63	30 August 1998	list
(40175) 1998 RE16	14 September 1998	list
(40214) 1998 SR63	29 September 1998	list
(40231) 1998 TS6	14 October 1998	list
(40271) 1999 JT	4 May 1999	list
(40768) 1999 TZ17	10 October 1999	list
(40769) 1999 TJ18	10 October 1999	list
(40772) 1999 TY19	14 October 1999	list
(40773) 1999 TZ19	15 October 1999	list
(40997) 1999 UE6	27 October 1999	list
(42567) 1996 XF33	6 December 1996	list
(42570) 1996 YA2	20 December 1996	list
(42571) 1996 YL3	18 December 1996	list
(42581) 1997 CB29	7 February 1997	list
(42606) 1998 DD	16 February 1998	list
(42712) 1998 QX28	23 August 1998	list
(42756) 1998 SA63	25 September 1998	list
(43053) 1999 VD72	11 November 1999	list
43259 Wangzhenyi	8 February 2000	list
(43886) 1995 GR7	3 April 1995	list

(43952) 1997 BG7	28 January 1997	list
(43964) 1997 EF23	7 March 1997	list
(43982) 1997 GA32	15 April 1997	list
(44008) 1997 TN25	11 October 1997	list
(44009) 1997 TB26	11 October 1997	list
(44024) 1997 WP47	19 November 1997	list
(44042) 1998 ES9	2 March 1998	list
(44208) 1998 OY6	20 July 1998	list
(44209) 1998 OH7	28 July 1998	list
(44314) 1998 RV15	4 September 1998	list
(44315) 1998 RG16	14 September 1998	list
(44359) 1998 SM9	17 September 1998	list
(44373) 1998 SU42	17 September 1998	list
(44374) 1998 SY42	20 September 1998	list
(44387) 1998 ST62	25 September 1998	list
(44388) 1998 SK63	27 September 1998	list
(44389) 1998 SO63	29 September 1998	list
(44431) 1998 TJ18	14 October 1998	list
(44432) 1998 TP19	15 October 1998	list
(44439) 1998 UR8	17 October 1998	list
(44442) 1998 UG17	17 October 1998	list
(44452) 1998 UO32	30 October 1998	list
(44470) 1998 VZ35	12 November 1998	list
(44531) 1998 YR8	17 December 1998	list
(44532) 1998 YA9	23 December 1998	list

(44730) 1999 TY17	4 October 1999	list
(44731) 1999 TF18	10 October 1999	list
(44732) 1999 TM18	14 October 1999	list
(44733) 1999 TW19	14 October 1999	list
(44855) 1999 UF6	28 October 1999	list
(44856) 1999 UH6	28 October 1999	list
(44953) 1999 VB72	11 November 1999	list
(44954) 1999 VN72	15 November 1999	list
(46645) 1995 OP1	19 July 1995	list
46669 Wangyongzhi	6 June 1996	list
(46677) 1996 TK6	7 October 1996	list
(46682) 1997 AV5	1 January 1997	list
(46734) 1997 TL25	9 October 1997	list
(46736) 1997 UD21	31 October 1997	list
(46826) 1998 OC7	28 July 1998	list
(46827) 1998 OJ7	28 July 1998	list
(46883) 1998 RT15	1 September 1998	list
(46933) 1998 SP62	20 September 1998	list
(46934) 1998 SN63	29 September 1998	list
(46993) 1998 TF18	13 October 1998	list
47005 Chengmaolan	16 October 1998	list
(47057) 1998 XM12	9 December 1998	list
(47091) 1999 AP9	10 January 1999	list
(47129) 1999 CR118	9 February 1999	list
(47256) 1999 VA72	11 November 1999	list

(48616) 1995 GP7	2 April 1995	list
48619 Jianli	21 May 1995	list
48636 Huangkun	28 September 1995	list
(48674) 1995 YV21	17 December 1995	list
(48689) 1996 GP1	8 April 1996	list
48700 Hanggao	17 April 1996	list
(48701) 1996 HD22	18 April 1996	list
(48704) 1996 JR2	14 May 1996	list
(48707) 1996 KR1	19 May 1996	list
(48724) 1996 XZ26	8 December 1996	list
(48763) 1997 JZ	2 May 1997	list
(48784) 1997 SX	17 September 1997	list
(48792) 1997 SC34	17 September 1997	list
48798 Penghuanwu	6 October 1997	list
(48806) 1997 UB21	30 October 1997	list
(48813) 1997 WJ1	19 November 1997	list
(48816) 1997 WP3	19 November 1997	list
(48829) 1997 YH1	17 December 1997	list
(48832) 1997 YR3	22 December 1997	list
(48835) 1997 YK18	22 December 1997	list
(48837) 1998 AR6	4 January 1998	list
(48889) 1998 KZ9	24 May 1998	list
(48938) 1998 QK5	22 August 1998	list
(49005) 1998 QN62	27 August 1998	list
(49115) 1998 SL9	17 September 1998	list

(49143) 1998 SK43	23 September 1998	list
(49173) 1998 SQ63	29 September 1998	list
(49186) 1998 SS75	20 September 1998	list
(49252) 1998 TZ18	14 October 1998	list
(49270) 1998 UB9	17 October 1998	list
(49287) 1998 US31	22 October 1998	list
(49328) 1998 VL35	1 November 1998	list
(49329) 1998 VQ35	9 November 1998	list
(49378) 1998 XU2	7 December 1998	list
(49379) 1998 XF3	8 December 1998	list
(49386) 1998 XH12	4 December 1998	list
(49392) 1998 XD26	15 December 1998	list
(49429) 1998 XZ95	2 December 1998	list
(49445) 1998 YS8	17 December 1998	list
(49455) 1998 YO22	29 December 1998	list
(49457) 1998 YC30	19 December 1998	list
(49466) 1999 AX8	6 January 1999	list
(49728) 1999 VE72	11 November 1999	list
(50233) 2000 AK246	13 January 2000	list
(52468) 1995 QB1	19 August 1995	list
52487 Huazhongkejida	6 December 1995	list
(52566) 1997 GP27	2 April 1997	list
(52572) 1997 LL	3 June 1997	list
(52588) 1997 PD1	3 August 1997	list
(52590) 1997 PC5	11 August 1997	list

(52596) 1997 RO8	4 September 1997	list
(52600) 1997 SP10	26 September 1997	list
(52609) 1997 TK24	5 October 1997	list
(52619) 1997 VR2	1 November 1997	list
(52626) 1997 WL1	19 November 1997	list
(52628) 1997 WO3	16 November 1997	list
(52644) 1997 XR10	8 December 1997	list
(52647) 1997 YD4	23 December 1997	list
(52651) 1997 YF18	27 December 1997	list
(52653) 1998 AJ3	3 January 1998	list
(52656) 1998 AN6	4 January 1998	list
(52684) 1998 EQ8	2 March 1998	list
(52685) 1998 EZ9	11 March 1998	list
(52779) 1998 QZ29	26 August 1998	list
(52875) 1998 SB43	20 September 1998	list
(52876) 1998 SQ43	25 September 1998	list
(52877) 1998 SU43	25 September 1998	list
(52892) 1998 SR62	20 September 1998	list
(52893) 1998 SD63	25 September 1998	list
(52995) 1998 UJ32	27 October 1998	list
(52996) 1998 UL32	29 October 1998	list
(53098) 1998 YM22	29 December 1998	list
(53114) 1999 AV9	10 January 1999	list
(53122) 1999 AS22	14 January 1999	list
(53314) 1999 JT2	7 May 1999	list

(54094) 2000 GU183	5 April 2000	list
(55824) 1995 QN1	19 August 1995	list
(55832) 1996 GD17	13 April 1996	list
(55837) 1996 JV2	15 May 1996	list
55838 Hagongda	7 June 1996	list
(55848) 1996 SF6	18 September 1996	list
(55849) 1996 TZ11	3 October 1996	list
(55855) 1996 VB7	2 November 1996	list
(55862) 1997 CV28	6 February 1997	list
(55865) 1997 PZ	3 August 1997	list
(55870) 1997 TD26	11 October 1997	list
(55878) 1997 VX7	3 November 1997	list
55892 Fuzhougezhi	1 December 1997	list
(55894) 1997 YS3	22 December 1997	list
55901 Xuaoao	15 February 1998	list
(55902) 1998 CO2	15 February 1998	list
(56046) 1998 XC26	15 December 1998	list
(56082) 1999 AK9	9 January 1999	list
(56087) 1999 AH22	13 January 1999	list
56088 Wuheng	14 January 1999	list
(56111) 1999 CO2	6 February 1999	list
(56196) 1999 GF7	13 April 1999	list
(58368) 1995 QK1	19 August 1995	list
(58385) 1995 SC53	28 September 1995	list
(58386) 1995 SM53	28 September 1995	list

(58389) 1995 TG2	14 October 1995	list
(58481) 1996 ST4	20 September 1996	list
(58482) 1996 TX1	3 October 1996	list
(58483) 1996 TB2	3 October 1996	list
(58486) 1996 TP13	5 October 1996	list
(58496) 1996 UY3	29 October 1996	list
(58497) 1996 UK4	29 October 1996	list
(58504) 1996 VZ3	7 November 1996	list
(58524) 1997 BE1	26 January 1997	list
(58528) 1997 BH7	28 January 1997	list
(58563) 1997 NE5	1 July 1997	list
(58564) 1997 NQ6	9 July 1997	list
(58566) 1997 PN3	5 August 1997	list
(58576) 1997 RQ9	4 September 1997	list
(58577) 1997 SV	16 September 1997	list
(58591) 1997 SV31	29 September 1997	list
(58598) 1997 TX11	7 October 1997	list
(58601) 1997 TW18	7 October 1997	list
(58603) 1997 TM25	11 October 1997	list
(58604) 1997 TT26	15 October 1997	list
58605 Liutungsheng	8 October 1997	list
(58611) 1997 UC4	17 October 1997	list
(58612) 1997 UA5	21 October 1997	list
(58617) 1997 UC21	31 October 1997	list
(58628) 1997 VP7	2 November 1997	list

(58629) 1997 VL8	1 November 1997	list
(58665) 1997 YO1	19 December 1997	list
(58668) 1997 YJ3	17 December 1997	list
(58678) 1997 YE18	24 December 1997	list
(58681) 1998 AJ7	5 January 1998	list
(58699) 1998 BK42	26 January 1998	list
(58708) 1998 CX1	6 February 1998	list
58714 Boya	16 February 1998	list
(58717) 1998 DE8	21 February 1998	list
(58719) 1998 DY10	17 February 1998	list
(58731) 1998 DE32	21 February 1998	list
(58737) 1998 EA10	14 March 1998	list
(58753) 1998 FO12	20 March 1998	list
(58754) 1998 FT12	21 March 1998	list
(58903) 1998 KC10	25 May 1998	list
(58932) 1998 OF7	28 July 1998	list
58941 Guishida	22 August 1998	list
(58993) 1998 SF9	17 September 1998	list
59000 Beiguan	17 September 1998	list
(59003) 1998 SL43	23 September 1998	list
(59004) 1998 SO43	25 September 1998	list
(59007) 1998 SF63	26 September 1998	list
(59008) 1998 SS63	30 September 1998	list
(59047) 1998 TO19	15 October 1998	list
(59063) 1998 UC32	27 October 1998	list

(59088) 1998 VW35	9 November 1998	list
(59115) 1998 XG3	8 December 1998	list
(59238) 1999 CN2	5 February 1999	list
(59241) 1999 CC4	6 February 1999	list
(59342) 1999 CS118	9 February 1999	list
59425 Xuyangsheng	7 April 1999	list
(59427) 1999 GM6	14 April 1999	list
(59466) 1999 GE_{54}	13 April 1999	list
(59485) 1999 JR	4 May 1999	list
(59486) 1999 JV	5 May 1999	list
(60010) 1999 TK18	13 October 1999	list
(60011) 1999 TA20	15 October 1999	list
(65780) 1995 TM1	14 October 1995	list
(65781) 1995 TT1	14 October 1995	list
(65828) 1996 VZ37	1 November 1996	list
(65829) 1996 WS2	26 November 1996	list
(65836) 1996 XS15	10 December 1996	list
(65842) 1997 AF14	4 January 1997	list
(65850) 1997 CG28	7 February 1997	list
(65871) 1997 UC22	28 October 1997	list
(65872) 1997 VQ2	1 November 1997	list
(65880) 1997 YD5	21 December 1997	list
(65887) 1998 AW6	5 January 1998	list
(65896) 1998 CW1	1 February 1998	list
(66003) 1998 OX6	20 July 1998	list

(66017) 1998 QC30	26 August 1998	list
(66193) 1999 AF22	13 January 1999	list
(66672) 1999 TB18	10 October 1999	list
(66811) 1999 UA6	18 October 1999	list
66885 Wangxiaomo	12 November 1999	list
(66886) 1999 VJ72	12 November 1999	list
(69428) 1996 EA3	9 March 1996	list
(69437) 1996 KW2	21 May 1996	list
(69446) 1996 SL4	21 September 1996	list
(69447) 1996 SG8	21 September 1996	list
(69449) 1996 TD2	3 October 1996	list
(69458) 1996 TQ54	5 October 1996	list
(69462) 1996 UB4	29 October 1996	list
(69463) 1996 VZ1	1 November 1996	list
(69478) 1996 XO15	10 December 1996	list
(69484) 1996 YR1	18 December 1996	list
(69491) 1997 AZ5	2 January 1997	list
(69507) 1997 CQ27	4 February 1997	list
(69516) 1997 FJ	21 March 1997	list
(69518) 1997 FS4	28 March 1997	list
(69558) 1997 TA26	10 October 1997	list
(69578) 1998 DC	16 February 1998	list
(69584) 1998 DZ10	17 February 1998	list
(69593) 1998 EN21	11 March 1998	list
(69746) 1998 KC58	28 May 1998	list

(69747) 1998 KD58	28 May 1998	list
(69757) 1998 OD7	28 July 1998	list
(69802) 1998 RX15	14 September 1998	list
69869 Haining	25 September 1998	list
(69921) 1998 TM19	15 October 1998	list
(69936) 1998 UD17	17 October 1998	list
(69963) 1998 VP35	4 November 1998	list
(69998) 1998 XD	1 December 1998	list
(70027) 1999 BQ15	18 January 1999	list
(70450) 1999 TL18	13 October 1999	list
(70451) 1999 TQ18	14 October 1999	list
(70454) 1999 TX19	14 October 1999	list
(71230) 1999 YR17	17 December 1999	list
(73848) 1996 SC1	18 September 1996	list
(73852) 1996 VB4	7 November 1996	list
(73863) 1996 XH33	8 December 1996	list
(73931) 1997 PK3	3 August 1997	list
(73939) 1997 SG10	26 September 1997	list
(73954) 1997 UR20	20 October 1997	list
(73957) 1997 VF7	2 November 1997	list
(73967) 1997 XX10	4 December 1997	list
(73970) 1998 AX6	5 January 1998	list
(73979) 1998 DF8	21 February 1998	list
74092 Xiangda	22 August 1998	list
(74225) 1998 SR9	17 September 1998	list

(74246) 1998 SS62	23 September 1998	list
(74319) 1998 UH17	17 October 1998	list
(74320) 1998 UX17	19 October 1998	list
(74413) 1999 AW8	6 January 1999	list
(74414) 1999 AN9	10 January 1999	list
(74415) 1999 AR9	10 January 1999	list
(74420) 1999 AR22	14 January 1999	list
(74793) 1999 SR10	29 September 1999	list
(74827) 1999 TW17	4 October 1999	list
(75073) 1999 VK21	11 November 1999	list
(79269) 1995 QG1	19 August 1995	list
(79285) 1995 SP53	28 September 1995	list
(79286) 1995 SQ53	28 September 1995	list
(79313) 1996 CK	1 February 1996	list
79316 Huangshan	18 April 1996	list
(79332) 1996 TY2	3 October 1996	list
(79351) 1997 AX5	1 January 1997	list
(79376) 1997 FF	18 March 1997	list
(79377) 1997 FV	18 March 1997	list
(79378) 1997 FF1	29 March 1997	list
(79399) 1997 GC30	13 April 1997	list
79418 Zhangjiajie	3 June 1997	list
79419 Gaolu	26 June 1997	list
(79428) 1997 SL10	26 September 1997	list
(79429) 1997 SO10	26 September 1997	list

(79440) 1997 TM24	8 October 1997	list
(79441) 1997 TB27	9 October 1997	list
(79446) 1997 VC7	1 November 1997	list
(79447) 1997 WQ1	21 November 1997	list
(79464) 1997 YW16	29 December 1997	list
(79473) 1998 BX8	18 January 1998	list
(79479) 1998 CJ2	1 February 1998	list
(79499) 1998 FB127	26 March 1998	list
(79536) 1998 QM29	23 August 1998	list
(79562) 1998 QU62	27 August 1998	list
(79585) 1998 RD16	14 September 1998	list
(79670) 1998 SF43	23 September 1998	list
(79671) 1998 SJ43	23 September 1998	list
(79672) 1998 SM43	23 September 1998	list
(79694) 1998 SZ62	25 September 1998	list
(79757) 1998 TR18	14 October 1998	list
(79811) 1998 VV35	9 November 1998	list
(79846) 1998 XS2	7 December 1998	list
(80022) 1999 JS	4 May 1999	list
(80059) 1999 JM75	8 May 1999	list
(80138) 1999 TY35	10 October 1999	list
(80171) 1999 UO6	28 October 1999	list
85293 Tengzhou	12 September 1994	list
(85395) 1996 SQ4	20 September 1996	list
(85396) 1996 SB7	21 September 1996	list

(85398) 1996 TH6	5 October 1996	list
(85408) 1996 TB55	3 October 1996	list
(85410) 1996 UJ4	29 October 1996	list
(85432) 1997 CK19	4 February 1997	list
(85465) 1997 JE14	11 May 1997	list
85472 Xizezong	9 June 1997	list
(85476) 1997 MY	26 June 1997	list
(85480) 1997 NB8	9 July 1997	list
(85487) 1997 SC1	19 September 1997	list
(85489) 1997 SV2	19 September 1997	list
(85504) 1997 TC26	11 October 1997	list
(85506) 1997 UU4	19 October 1997	list
(85507) 1997 UD5	21 October 1997	list
(85519) 1997 VR8	3 November 1997	list
(85544) 1997 WJ50	28 November 1997	list
(85556) 1997 YV16	29 December 1997	list
(85557) 1997 YY16	30 December 1997	list
85558 Tianjinshida	3 January 1998	list
(85658) 1998 QS28	22 August 1998	list
(85659) 1998 QU29	23 August 1998	list
(85706) 1998 SB27	20 September 1998	list
(85711) 1998 SP43	25 September 1998	list
(85721) 1998 SL63	29 September 1998	list
85728 Yangfujia	17 September 1998	list
(85985) 1999 JW	5 May 1999	list

(85986) 1999 JX	6 May 1999	list
(86482) 2000 CJ104	7 February 2000	list
(90824) 1995 SF53	28 September 1995	list
90825 Lizhensheng	28 September 1995	list
90826 Xuzhihong	14 October 1995	list
90830 Beihang	25 October 1995	list
(90851) 1996 GX	7 April 1996	list
(90867) 1996 SX6	21 September 1996	list
(90868) 1996 SX7	18 September 1996	list
(90878) 1996 VY37	1 November 1996	list
(90897) 1997 CF6	1 February 1997	list
(90904) 1997 EQ11	4 March 1997	list
90919 Luoliaofu	11 August 1997	list
(90931) 1997 SR32	30 September 1997	list
(90942) 1997 TS24	9 October 1997	list
(90945) 1997 UE5	22 October 1997	list
(90952) 1997 VD7	1 November 1997	list
(90964) 1997 WF22	28 November 1997	list
(90986) 1997 XS10	8 December 1997	list
(90987) 1997 XM11	15 December 1997	list
(90990) 1997 YT3	22 December 1997	list
(90991) 1997 YU10	24 December 1997	list
(90992) 1997 YW10	24 December 1997	list
(90994) 1997 YH18	29 December 1997	list
91001 Shanghaishida	18 January 1998	list

(91010) 1998 CD1	1 February 1998	list
91023 Lutan	23 February 1998	list
(91034) 1998 EH21	1 March 1998	list
(91035) 1998 EM21	5 March 1998	list
(91089) 1998 FW126	24 March 1998	list
(91150) 1998 QA30	26 August 1998	list
(91157) 1998 QG62	26 August 1998	list
(91203) 1998 UE18	19 October 1998	list
(91310) 1999 GH5	6 April 1999	list
(91605) 1999 TC20	15 October 1999	list
(91606) 1999 TE20	15 October 1999	list
(91848) 1999 UG6	28 October 1999	list
(91849) 1999 UK6	28 October 1999	list
92209 Pingtang	26 December 1999	list
(96294) 1996 JE2	11 May 1996	list
(96296) 1996 OK1	20 July 1996	list
(96300) 1996 SC8	21 September 1996	list
(96306) 1996 WO2	20 November 1996	list
(96326) 1997 EN11	3 March 1997	list
(96346) 1997 SC10	23 September 1997	list
(96370) 1997 XS5	1 December 1997	list
(96377) 1998 AU6	4 January 1998	list
(96391) 1998 CZ1	6 February 1998	list
(96406) 1998 EW7	2 March 1998	list
(96407) 1998 EU8	5 March 1998	list

(96408) 1998 EV9	5 March 1998	list
(96508) 1998 QJ30	26 August 1998	list
(96549) 1998 SE63	26 September 1998	list
(96567) 1998 TE18	13 October 1998	list
(96568) 1998 TS19	15 October 1998	list
(96590) 1998 XB	1 December 1998	list
(96602) 1998 YF9	23 December 1998	list
(96612) 1999 CZ3	5 February 1999	list
(96880) 1999 TD18	10 October 1999	list
(97647) 2000 EG201	5 March 2000	list
(99911) 1995 SE53	28 September 1995	list
(100313) 1995 LD1	5 June 1995	list
(100331) 1995 QV9	23 August 1995	list
(100353) 1995 TC2	14 October 1995	list
100434 Jinyilian	6 June 1996	list
(100453) 1996 SA4	18 September 1996	list
(100454) 1996 SA6	18 September 1996	list
(100455) 1996 SB6	18 September 1996	list
(100464) 1996 TE15	3 October 1996	list
(100484) 1996 UL4	29 October 1996	list
(100494) 1996 VF39	9 November 1996	list
(100536) 1997 CD28	6 February 1997	list
(100597) 1997 PY4	11 August 1997	list
(100622) 1997 TK26	13 October 1997	list
(100638) 1997 VS2	1 November 1997	list

(100645) 1997 VP8	3 November 1997	list
(100669) 1997 WK50	28 November 1997	list
(100678) 1997 XV9	4 December 1997	list
(100679) 1997 XV10	15 December 1997	list
(100680) 1997 XW10	15 December 1997	list
(100681) 1997 YD1	19 December 1997	list
(100682) 1997 YE1	19 December 1997	list
(100683) 1997 YW1	20 December 1997	list
(100684) 1997 YX1	21 December 1997	list
(100687) 1997 YF4	23 December 1997	list
(100694) 1997 YH11	21 December 1997	list
(100982) 1998 QU28	22 August 1998	list
(100983) 1998 QQ29	23 August 1998	list
(101026) 1998 QT63	30 August 1998	list
(101055) 1998 RL	1 September 1998	list
(101070) 1998 RY15	14 September 1998	list
(101180) 1998 SH9	17 September 1998	list
(101204) 1998 SV42	17 September 1998	list
(101222) 1998 SQ62	20 September 1998	list
(101223) 1998 SW62	25 September 1998	list
(101349) 1998 TA19	14 October 1998	list
(101356) 1998 TD36	15 October 1998	list
(101373) 1998 UV8	17 October 1998	list
(101380) 1998 UT17	18 October 1998	list
(101559) 1999 AJ9	9 January 1999	list

(101810) 1999 JA6	8 May 1999	list
(102230) 1999 TA18	10 October 1999	list
(102231) 1999 TS18	14 October 1999	list
(102535) 1999 UL6	28 October 1999	list
102536 Luanenjie	28 October 1999	list
(102688) 1999 VK72	12 November 1999	list
(106208) 2000 UW30	26 October 2000	list
(106421) 2000 VE38	1 November 2000	list
(118193) 1994 RG25	12 September 1994	list
(118223) 1996 SO4	21 September 1996	list
(118224) 1996 TT1	3 October 1996	list
(118239) 1997 KX	31 May 1997	list
(118245) 1997 SF10	23 September 1997	list
(118290) 1998 SZ26	20 September 1998	list
(118293) 1998 SV62	25 September 1998	list
(118294) 1998 SQ75	17 September 1998	list
(118418) 1999 TP18	14 October 1999	list
(120540) 1994 SK13	30 September 1994	list
120569 Huangrunqian	24 March 1995	list
(120574) 1995 OB10	19 July 1995	list
(120602) 1995 VZ1	11 November 1995	list
(120639) 1996 KJ3	24 May 1996	list
(120648) 1996 SE4	19 September 1996	list
(120673) 1997 AA6	2 January 1997	list
(120730) 1997 SN33	26 September 1997	list

(120739) 1997 TE26	11 October 1997	list
(120764) 1998 BV8	18 January 1998	list
(120769) 1998 CM1	6 February 1998	list
(120771) 1998 DD8	21 February 1998	list
(120774) 1998 DQ20	24 February 1998	list
(120779) 1998 ET8	5 March 1998	list
(120787) 1998 FS12	20 March 1998	list
(120869) 1998 RZ15	14 September 1998	list
120942 Rendafuzhong	1 October 1998	list
(120951) 1998 UA9	17 October 1998	list
(120955) 1998 UO31	22 October 1998	list
(121001) 1998 YW8	22 December 1998	list
121007 Jiaxingnanhu	10 January 1999	list
(121014) 1999 AJ22	13 January 1999	list
(121107) 1999 GF5	3 April 1999	list
(121342) 1999 TV19	10 October 1999	list
(121513) 1999 UJ6	28 October 1999	list
(121547) 1999 VS20	11 November 1999	list
(123101) 2000 SQ344	29 September 2000	list
(129546) 1996 TZ1	3 October 1996	list
(129547) 1996 TC6	3 October 1996	list
(129575) 1997 LM	3 June 1997	list
(129579) 1997 SF1	21 September 1997	list
(129599) 1997 VD8	6 November 1997	list
(129620) 1998 EA3	1 March 1998	list

(129714) 1998 TE19	14 October 1998	list
(129737) 1999 AA9	9 January 1999	list
(134370) 1995 QA1	19 August 1995	list
(134383) 1996 CF8	10 February 1996	list
(134423) 1998 QT4	22 August 1998	list
(134466) 1998 TD19	14 October 1998	list
(134468) 1998 UX8	17 October 1998	list
(136705) 1995 TY1	14 October 1995	list
(136774) 1996 TC12	3 October 1996	list
(136837) 1997 VV7	2 November 1997	list
(136838) 1997 WG22	28 November 1997	list
(136849) 1998 CS1	9 February 1998	list
(136850) 1998 DX2	17 February 1998	list
(136932) 1998 OB7	28 July 1998	list
(136933) 1998 QX4	22 August 1998	list
(136937) 1998 QT28	22 August 1998	list
(136996) 1998 SJ63	26 September 1998	list
(137029) 1998 TB19	14 October 1998	list
(137030) 1998 TR19	15 October 1998	list
(137035) 1998 UE17	17 October 1998	list
(137036) 1998 UC18	19 October 1998	list
137039 Lisiguang	26 October 1998	list
(137059) 1998 VA49	11 November 1998	list
(137315) 1999 TB20	15 October 1999	list
(137544) 1999 VG72	12 November 1999	list

(145766) 1997 MX	26 June 1997	list
(145780) 1998 DG8	21 February 1998	list
(145795) 1998 RA16	14 September 1998	list
(145822) 1998 TW18	14 October 1998	list
(145826) 1998 UP45	23 October 1998	list
(147999) 1997 AC14	2 January 1997	list
(148012) 1997 TT18	6 October 1997	list
(148013) 1997 US20	21 October 1997	list
(148027) 1998 EH9	8 March 1998	list
148081 Sunjiadong	11 January 1999	list
(148255) 2000 EF201	5 March 2000	list
(150161) 1997 PE5	11 August 1997	list
(150166) 1997 WS1	21 November 1997	list
(150174) 1998 DU32	25 February 1998	list
(150190) 1998 QB5	22 August 1998	list
(150206) 1998 SN9	17 September 1998	list
(152640) 1997 PP3	5 August 1997	list
(152646) 1997 SM33	23 September 1997	list
(152651) 1997 VN8	1 November 1997	list
(152659) 1997 XQ9	4 December 1997	list
(152662) 1998 DQ8	21 February 1998	list
(152663) 1998 DF32	21 February 1998	list
(152689) 1998 QC63	30 August 1998	list
(152704) 1998 SD4	17 September 1998	list
(152723) 1998 UM31	22 October 1998	list

(152744) 1998 YC9	23 December 1998	list
(155433) 1997 UQ4	18 October 1997	list
(155434) 1997 VQ8	3 November 1997	list
(155456) 1998 QQ62	27 August 1998	list
(155466) 1998 SJ9	17 September 1998	list
(157827) 1997 TV18	7 October 1997	list
(157843) 1998 QS29	23 August 1998	list
(159375) 1996 XQ31	8 December 1996	list
(159386) 1998 KE58	28 May 1998	list
(160521) 1995 KU	21 May 1995	list
(162049) 1996 SZ7	21 September 1996	list
(162050) 1996 SD8	21 September 1996	list
(162096) 1998 QD30	26 August 1998	list
(162097) 1998 QF30	26 August 1998	list
(162114) 1998 SP9	17 September 1998	list
(162122) 1998 SH63	26 September 1998	list
(163356) 2002 NJ59	8 July 2002	list
(164656) 1996 RP5	15 September 1996	list
(164661) 1996 ST7	17 September 1996	list
(164663) 1996 TQ13	5 October 1996	list
(164726) 1998 QE107	19 August 1998	list
(164750) 1998 TW29	14 October 1998	list
(164752) 1998 UR17	18 October 1998	list
(164756) 1998 VR35	9 November 1998	list
(164757) 1998 VY35	12 November 1998	list

(164769) 1999 AG38	9 January 1999	list
(168381) 1997 LY4	10 June 1997	list
(168416) 1998 QE30	26 August 1998	list
(168450) 1999 AD22	11 January 1999	list
(168502) 1999 SS10	29 September 1999	list
(173179) 1997 TL24	6 October 1997	list
(173222) 1998 UQ8	17 October 1998	list
(173224) 1998 UF17	17 October 1998	list
(175712) 1996 TP54	5 October 1996	list
175718 Wuzhengyi	2 February 1997	list
(175774) 1999 AQ22	14 January 1999	list
(175819) 1999 TN18	14 October 1999	list
(178361) 1996 WL3	28 November 1996	list
(178390) 1998 EC10	1 March 1998	list
(178445) 1999 CT118	10 February 1999	list
(179379) 2001 XL249	13 December 2001	list
(181781) 1997 YG4	23 December 1997	list
(181791) 1998 EX9	8 March 1998	list
(181800) 1998 QZ4	22 August 1998	list
(181822) 1998 SQ9	17 September 1998	list
(181829) 1998 SY62	25 September 1998	list
(181849) 1998 UM17	17 October 1998	list
(181864) 1999 AQ9	10 January 1999	list
(185678) 1995 TN1	14 October 1995	list
(185758) 1999 TE18	10 October 1999	list

(187757) 1996 UH4	29 October 1996	list
(187767) 1998 QP4	22 August 1998	list
(187789) 1998 UN31	22 October 1998	list
(187802) 1999 JU2	8 May 1999	list
(187810) 1999 TC18	10 October 1999	list
(189018) 1998 TC19	14 October 1998	list
(189432) 1998 QJ29	22 August 1998	list
(189440) 1998 SZ42	20 September 1998	list
(190316) 1997 WC22	28 November 1997	list
192353 Wangdazhong	14 October 1995	list
192391 Yunda	3 October 1996	list
(192440) 1997 VH7	2 November 1997	list
(192441) 1997 WH1	19 November 1997	list
(192450) 1997 WY21	23 November 1997	list
(192462) 1998 EZ7	2 March 1998	list
(192509) 1998 QL5	22 August 1998	list
(192510) 1998 QX29	25 August 1998	list
(192515) 1998 RS15	1 September 1998	list
(192558) 1998 UM44	17 October 1998	list
(192583) 1999 AY9	13 January 1999	list
(200140) 1997 WH22	28 November 1997	list
(202920) 1997 YP19	29 December 1997	list
(202925) 1998 QF29	22 August 1998	list
(203692) 2002 NK59	8 July 2002	list
(204995) 1996 TZ2	3 October 1996	list

(204996) 1996 TU5	3 October 1996	list
(208239) 2000 SN344	29 September 2000	list
(210518) 1998 SX43	26 September 1998	list
(213027) 1996 VZ6	2 November 1996	list
(213051) 1998 UZ17	19 October 1998	list
(213069) 1999 TX17	4 October 1999	list
(215114) 1998 DJ8	21 February 1998	list
(217642) 1997 UD22	31 October 1997	list
(217650) 1998 QN29	23 August 1998	list
(219129) 1998 UK31	20 October 1998	list
(221996) 1997 YN1	19 December 1997	list
(228242) 1998 UQ17	18 October 1998	list
(228243) 1998 US17	18 October 1998	list
(229945) 1998 US8	17 October 1998	list
(231678) 1995 QC1	19 August 1995	list
(231679) 1995 QE1	19 August 1995	list
(237382) 1995 VV18	14 November 1995	list
(237384) 1996 CX	7 February 1996	list
(237402) 1998 QV28	23 August 1998	list
(243576) 1996 VB39	7 November 1996	list
(246880) 1995 SR54	17 September 1995	list
(246909) 1998 QV4	22 August 1998	list
(249573) 1994 RA25	12 September 1994	list
(249599) 1997 YN3	21 December 1997	list
(251737) 1998 QK62	26 August 1998	list

(257544) 1998 QU4	22 August 1998	list
(257550) 1998 SV43	26 September 1998	list
(257559) 1998 TL19	15 October 1998	list
(264281) 1998 DO31	23 February 1998	list
(264290) 1998 SD27	20 September 1998	list
(267051) 1998 SA27	20 September 1998	list
(269731) 1998 SG_{63}	26 September 1998	list
(269740) 1998 TF36	15 October 1998	list
(269741) 1998 UY8	17 October 1998	list
(279754) 1998 UB18	19 October 1998	list
(282053) 1999 TO18	14 October 1999	list
(283333) 1998 QW29	23 August 1998	list
(285143) 1995 UZ4	23 October 1995	list
(285250) 1998 DH8	21 February 1998	list
(285264) 1998 QF5	22 August 1998	list
(285285) 1998 SP63	29 September 1998	list
(297309) 1998 UJ18	20 October 1998	list
(299107) 2005 EY129	30 August 1998	list
(301886) 1998 QY4	22 August 1998	list
(306423) 1998 QR_{28}	22 August 1998	list
(312711) 2010 PO_{71}	22 August 1998	list
(312965) 1998 EW_{9}	5 March 1998	list
(312967) 1998 QW_{28}	23 August 1998	list
(314843) 2006 UT_{181}	10 January 1999	list
(316540) 2010 WZ_{70}	14 October 1996	list

(316636) 2011 XY	24 December 1997	list
(316694) 1996 TW_{1}	3 October 1996	list
(322009) 2010 UV_{92}	3 August 1997	list
(326629) 2002 RF_{249}	15 September 2002	list
(329038) 2011 AU_{40}	22 September 1996	list
(329575) 2002 VS_{138}	13 November 2002	list
(333808) 2011 JZ_{17}	26 November 1995	list
(337090) 1998 TJ_{19}	15 October 1998	list
(344491) 2002 QU_{79}	20 August 2002	list
(353440) 2011 QS_{70}	19 August 1995	list
(356992) 1998 QH_{29}	22 August 1998	list
(356999) 1998 TV_{18}	14 October 1998	list
363018 Wenda	3 October 1996	list
(365856) 2011 UA_{127}	14 October 1998	list
(366564) 2002 RE_{249}	15 September 2002	list
(373419) 1998 TX_{29}	14 October 1998	list
(373733) 2002 TS_{14}	5 September 2002	list
(379292) 2009 VB_{43}	22 September 1996	list
(390530) 1998 EG_{8}	2 March 1998	list
(396449) 2014 FO_{8}	29 September 2000	list
(396550) 1998 QK_{30}	26 August 1998	list
(399322) 1998 QW_{63}	31 August 1998	list
(405149) 2002 SE_{12}	15 September 2002	list
(408983) 2002 SL_{9}	5 September 2002	list
(413164) 2002 NL_{59}	13 July 2002	list

(419689) 2010 UJ_{15}	25 October 1995	list
(420989) 2013 PD_{36}	6 January 1998	list
(430421) 1998 TA_{3}	13 October 1998	list
(433866) 2015 BV_{296}	29 March 1997	list
(436652) 2011 RK_{11}	14 September 1998	list
(436989) 2012 TW_{211}	20 October 1997	list
(437224) 2012 XW_{1}	14 October 1995	list
(439843) 1998 QR_{29}	23 August 1998	list
(443155) 2014 CU_{7}	22 August 1998	list
(443435) 2014 HG_{138}	21 September 1996	list
(449956) 2015 OA_{78}	29 September 1997	list
(454581) 2014 PU_{24}	14 February 1997	list
(455157) 1997 YM_{3}	20 December 1997	list
(455160) 1998 QV_{29}	23 August 1998	list
(464273) 2015 WU_{2}	19 January 1996	list
(472149) 2014 CK_{20}	11 February 1997	list
(482835) 2014 AH_{7}	25 September 1998	list
(482995) 2014 QD_{38}	22 August 1998	list
(483491) 2002 TB_{18}	5 September 2002	list
(485163) 2010 RU_{96}	9 October 1997	list
(485446) 2011 QS_{85}	25 September 1998	list
(487584) 2015 FD_{304}	30 August 1998	list
(487931) 2015 TR_{209}	20 September 1998	list
(491572) 2012 RF_{12}	15 October 1998	list
(503625) 2016 GO_{135}	23 August 1998	list

(503877) 2000 SR_{344}	29 September 2000	list
(516041) 2015 TQ_{118}	22 August 1998	list
(516297) 2016 WC_{53}	14 October 1995	list
(537721) 2015 TO_{234}	18 October 1996	list
Discoveries are credited with "Beijing Schmidt CCD Asteroid Program" by the Minor Planet Center

== See also ==
- List of minor planet discoverers § Discovering dedicated institutions
