= (15430) 1998 UR31 =

Main-belt asteroid binary

(15430) 1998 UR_{31}
Discovery
- Discovered by: SCAP
- Discovery site: Beijing Xinglong Obs.
- Discovery date: 22 October 1998

Designations
- Alternative designations: 1980 EK_{1} · 2000 AB_{153}
- Minor planet category: main-belt

Orbital characteristics
- Epoch 13 January 2016 (JD 2457400.5)
- Uncertainty parameter 0
- Observation arc: 22044 days (60.35 yr)
- Aphelion: 2.6001 AU (388.97 Gm)
- Perihelion: 1.8433 AU (275.75 Gm)
- Semi-major axis: 2.2217 AU (332.36 Gm)
- Eccentricity: 0.17032
- Orbital period (sidereal): 3.31 yr (1209.6 d)
- Mean anomaly: 245.22°
- Mean motion: 0° 17^{m} 51.468^{s} / day
- Inclination: 8.1801°
- Longitude of ascending node: 62.806°
- Argument of perihelion: 177.42°
- Earth MOID: 0.829914 AU (124.1534 Gm)

Physical characteristics
- Synodic rotation period: 2.52735 h (0.105306 d)
- Absolute magnitude (H): 14.2

(15430) 1998 UR_{31} is a main-belt binary asteroid. It was discovered through the Beijing Schmidt CCD Asteroid Program at the Xinglong Station in the Chinese province of Hebei on October 22, 1998. A moon was discovered orbiting the asteroid in 2010. The moon has an orbital period of almost exactly a day, and is tidally locked with the asteroid.

== See also ==
- List of minor planets: 15001–16000
