= Liu Bing =

Liu Bing or Bing Liu may refer to:

- Emperor Chong of Han (143–145), personal name Liu Bing, infant emperor of the Han dynasty
- Liu Bing (official) (433–477), official of the Liu Song dynasty
- Bing Liu (computer scientist) (born 1963), Chinese-American computer scientist
- Bing Liu (filmmaker) (born 1989), Chinese-American documentary filmmaker
- Bing Liu (scientist) (1982/1983–2020), Chinese-American coronavirus researcher, murdered over an intimate partner

== See also ==
- Liu Bin (disambiguation)
- Liu Ping (disambiguation)
