= Liu Ping =

Liu Ping is the name of:

- Liu Ping (activist) (born 1964), Chinese civil rights activist
- Liu Ping (sprinter) (born 1984), Chinese Paralympic sprinter
- Liu Ping (water polo) (born 1987), Chinese water polo player

== See also ==
- Liu Bing (disambiguation) (Liu Bing is the pinyin equivalent of Liu Ping in older sources)
