= Liu Bin (politician, born 1937) =

Chinese politician (1937–2024)

Liu Bin (February 1937 – October 1, 2024, Chinese: 柳斌) was a Chinese official from Pingxiang, Jiangxi Province.

== Biography ==
Liu Bin became a member of the Chinese Communist Party (CCP) in April 1965. He was appointed as a teacher in the Office of International Students at Beijing Normal University in 1961, served as the director of the Education Bureau of Pingxiang City in Jiangxi Province, held a position as a member of the Standing Committee of the Municipal Committee of the CCP, and was appointed deputy governor of Jiangxi Province in 1983. In 1985, he became the deputy director and a member of the party group of the State Education Commission, as well as the director of the National Working Committee on Language and Literature.

Since 1993, he served as deputy director and member of the party group of the National Education Commission, head of the Discipline Inspection Group of the Central Commission for Discipline Inspection within the National Education Commission, director of the State Language and Literature Working Committee, and chief inspector of the National Education Commission. From 1994 to 1995, he served as the deputy director and a member of the party group of the National Education Commission, led the Discipline Inspection Group of the Central Commission for Discipline Inspection inside the National Education Commission, and held the position of chief inspector of the National Education Commission. From 1995, Liu Bin served as the deputy director and a member of the party group of the State Education Commission, leading the Discipline Inspection Group of the Central Commission for Discipline Inspection at the State Education Commission, and held the position of chief inspector general of the State Education Commission from 1998 to 2001.

Liu Bin was a member of the 14th Central Commission for Discipline Inspection of the CCP, a delegate to the 15th National Congress of the CCP, a delegate to the 6th National People's Congress, a member of the UNESCO and Healthcare Committee of the 9th NPC, and a member of the Standing Committee of the 10th NPC. He served as the president of the China Education Association for International Exchange.

Liu Bin died in Beijing on October 1, 2024, at the age of 88, owing to illness.
