= C/1997 L1 (Zhu–Balam) =

Non-periodic comet

C/1997 L1 (Zhu-Balam)
Discovery
- Discovered by: Zhu Jin; David D. Balam
- Discovery site: Beijing, China; Victoria, Australia
- Discovery date: 3–8 June 1997

Designations
- Alternative designations: Comet Xinglong

Orbital characteristics
- Epoch: 22 August 1997 (JD 2450682.5)
- Observation arc: 453 days (1.24 years)
- Number of observations: 213
- Aphelion: ~4,800 AU
- Perihelion: 4.899 AU
- Semi-major axis: ~2,420 AU
- Eccentricity: 0.99797
- Orbital period: ~118,900 years
- Inclination: 72.991°
- Longitude of ascending node: 233.30°
- Argument of periapsis: 346.37°
- Mean anomaly: 0.002°
- Last perihelion: 22 November 1996
- T_{Jupiter}: 0.805
- Earth MOID: 3.9127 AU
- Jupiter MOID: 0.4171 AU

Physical characteristics
- Dimensions: 10 km (6.2 mi)
- Comet total magnitude (M1): 6.5
- Comet nuclear magnitude (M2): 8.5

Comet Zhu–Balam, formally designated C/1997 L1, is a non-periodic comet first identified by David D. Balam on 8 June 1997, and originally photographed by Zhu Jin on 3 June 1997. The comet is estimated at 10 kilometres in diameter, with a period of approximately 36,895 years.

Until 1998, the comet was formerly known as Comet Xinglong, until the International Astronomical Union (IAU) agreed to rename it Zhu–Balam after its first two discoverers.

== Orbit ==
Given the orbital eccentricity of this object, different epochs can generate quite different heliocentric unperturbed two-body best-fit solutions to the aphelion distance (maximum distance) of this object. For objects at such high eccentricity, the Sun's barycentric coordinates are more stable than heliocentric coordinates. Using JPL Horizons the barycentric orbital elements for epoch 2015-Jan-01 generate a semi-major axis of 1,100 AU and a period of approximately 36,895 years.
