= Chen Zongxing =

Chinese politician

Chen Zongxing (Chinese: 陈宗兴; born June 1943) was a Chinese male politician, who served as the vice chairperson of the Chinese People's Political Consultative Conference.
