= Beijing Planetarium =

Planetarium in Beijing, China

Coordinates: 39.9361°N 116.3306°E

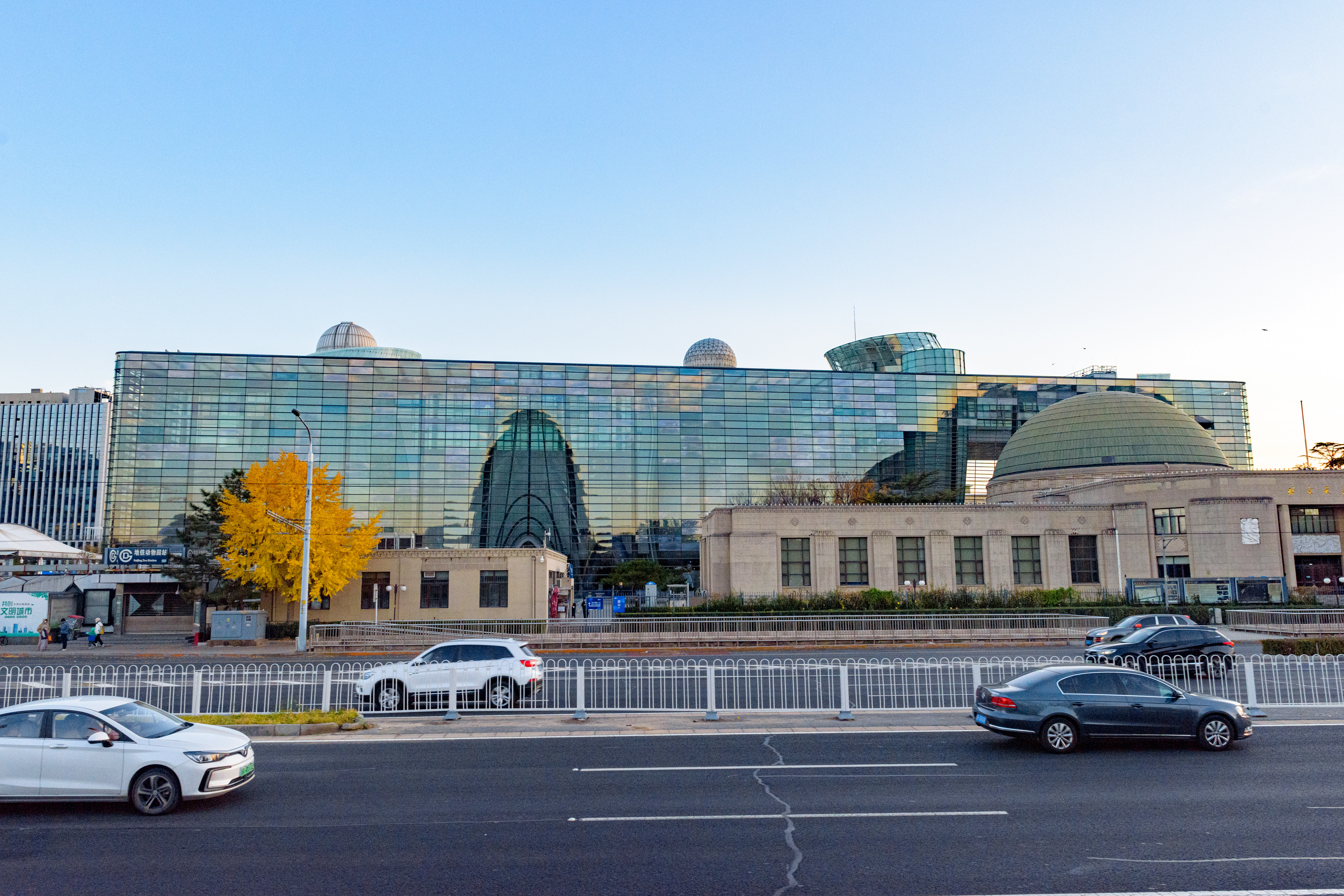
New wing (back) and old wing (front) of the Beijing Planetarium

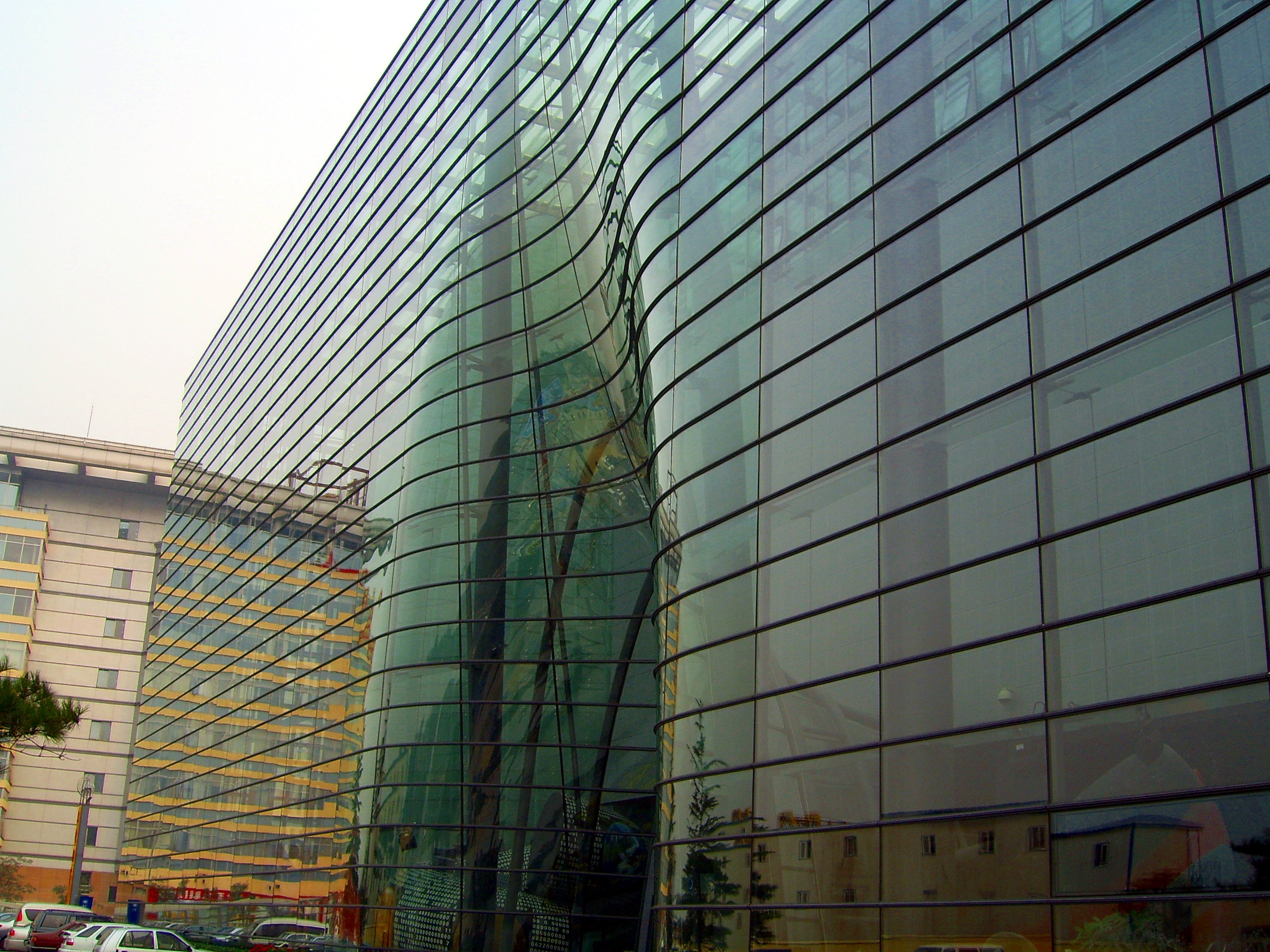
The entrance to the Building B of the Beijing Planetarium

The Beijing Planetarium (simplified Chinese: 北京天文馆; traditional Chinese: 北京天文館) is a planetarium in Xicheng District, Beijing, China.

The planetarium comprises two main buildings, Building A & B. Building A, which was built in 1957, contains the Celestial Theater, an Eastern Exhibition Hall and a Western Exhibition Hall. It was the first large-scale planetarium in China and on the Asian mainland. Building B, which began operations in 2004, contains a digital space theater, 3D and 4D theaters, several exhibition halls and two observatories.

== See also ==
- List of planetariums
