= Closet flange =

Pipe fitting

PVC closet flange with steel flange, before installation

Closet flange (also known as a toilet flange) is a pipe fitting (specifically, a type of flange) that both mounts a toilet to the floor and connects the closet bend to a drain pipe. The name comes from the term "water closet", the traditional name for a toilet. Closet flanges are typically made of brass, cast iron, ABS, PVC, or stainless steel. In a typical installation, the closet flange is mounted on top of the floor with the hub fused around the drain pipe. A wax ring (or waxless) is used to seal the gap between the flange and the bottom of the toilet. The toilet is bolted to the flange, not to the floor.
