= Bolt circle =

Mechanical engineering term

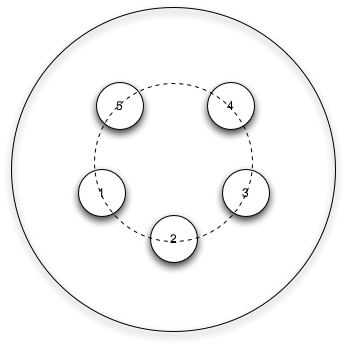
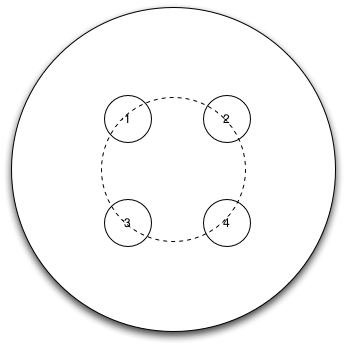
Drawing of 5-hole (left) and 4-hole (right) pitch circles

A bolt circle diameter or pitch circle diameter (PCD), sometimes simply called bolt circle or pitch circle, is a common term for when a number of screw holes for bolts are evenly distributed with their centers along an imaginary circle with a given diameter.

An example of use is mounting of car rims, where the bolt circle is one of several factors that determine whether a set of rims will fit a car. For example, a bolt circle of 5×130 or 5-130 indicates that a rim is to be attached to the car via 5 screws evenly spaced along a circle with a diameter of 130 millimeters. Other common uses for bolt circles are for indicating mounting for sim racing and real-world car steering wheels, or in the industry for mounting of servomotors or for specifying the bolt pattern of a flange. Attachment of chain rings for bicycle cranksets are also specified by a bolt circle.

== Standards ==
NEMA ICS 16 defines flange patterns that are either defined in millimeters or inches (see collapsible table with comparisons below):

- Metric-based
- Inch-based

NEMA ICS 16:2001
Flange type	Bolt circle (M)		Square flange max width (BD)		Flange min diameter (N)		Flange max diameter (P)		Number of holes	Free holes (S)		Tapped holes
Flange type	mm	inch	mm	inch	mm	inch	mm	inch	Number of holes	mm	inch	Tapped holes
17 C	43.18	1.7	43.82	1.725	21.999	0.8661	59.94	2.36	4	3.81	0.150	#4-40
17 D	43.18	1.7	50.8	2.000	21.999	0.8661	59.94	2.36	4	4	0.150	#4-40
55	55	2.165	53	2.087	40	1.5748	70	2.756	4	5.8	0.228	M5
23	58.42	2.3	66.675	2.625	38.100	1.5000	59.94	2.36	4	5.21	0.205	#8-32
65	65	2.559	60	2.362	50	1.9685	80	3.150	4	5.8	0.228	M5
70	70	2.756	60	2.362	50	1.9685	80	3.150	4	5.5	0.217	M5
75	75	2.953	70	2.756	60	2.3622	50	1.969	4	5.8	0.228	M5
85	85	3.346	80	3.150	70	2.7559	105	4.134	4	7	0.276	M6
34	86.36	3.4	98.425	3.875	73.025	2.8750	81.53	3.21	4	5.59	0.220	#10-32
100	100	3.937	90	3.543	80	3.1496	120	4.724	4	7	0.276	M6
42	106.68	4.2	125.73	4.950	55.563	2.1875	90.93	3.58	4	7.11	0.280	1/4"-20
115	115	4.528	105	4.134	95	3.7402	140	5.512	4	10	0.394	M8
48	121.92	4.8	95.25	3.750	76.200	3.0000	157.23	6.19	4	7.11	0.280	1/4"-20
130	130	5.118	120	4.724	110	4.3307	160	6.299	4	10	0.394	M8
56	142.24	5.6	149.225	5.875	114.300	4.5000	143.00	5.63	4	10.16	0.400	3/8"-16
145	145	5.709	130	5.118	110	4.3307	165	6.496	4	9	0.354	M8
165	165	6.496	140	5.512	130	5.1181	200	7.874	4	12	0.472	M10
200	200	7.874	174	6.850	114.3	4.5000	225	8.858	4	13.5	0.531	M12
215	215	8.465	190	7.480	180	7.0866	250	9.843	4	14.5	0.571	M12
265	265	10.433	225	8.858	230	9.0551	300	11.811	4	14.5	0.571	M12
300	300	11.811	265	10.433	250	9.8425	350	13.780	4	18.5	0.728	M16
350	350	13.780	300	11.811	300	11.8110	400	15.748	4	18.5	0.728	M16
400	400	15.748	340	13.386	350	13.7795	450	17.717	8	18.5	0.728	M16
500	500	19.685	415	16.339	450	17.7165	550	21.654	8	18.5	0.728	M16
600	600	23.622	495	19.488	550	21.6535	660	25.984	8	24	0.945	M20
740	740	29.134	600	23.622	680	26.7717	800	31.496	8	24	0.945	M20
940	940	37.008	750	29.528	880	34.6457	1000	39.370	8	28	1.102	M24
1080	1080	42.520	865	34.055	1000	39.3701	1150	45.276	8	28	1.102	M24

== Examples ==
=== Racing wheels ===
On steering wheels for cars utilizing bolt circles, this usually measures 6×70 mm. Some racing wheels attach to the car via a quick release hub, and this hub then usually has a corresponding bolt circle of 6×70 mm. Example of other less used patterns include: 3×1.75 in (44.45 mm), 5×2.75 in (69.85 mm), 6×74 mm and 6×2.75 in (69.85 mm).

=== Servomotors ===
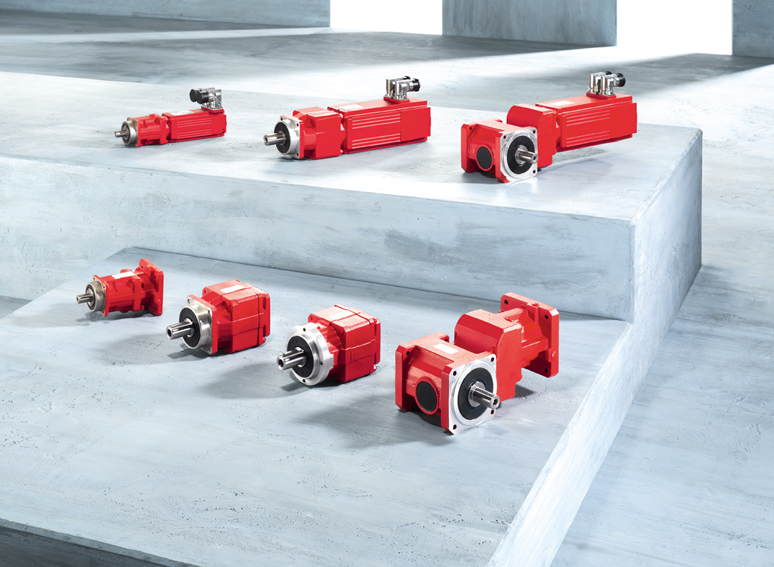
Industrial servomotors and gearboxes, with standardised flange mountings for interchangeability.

Servomotors in the industry are often mounted via a flange-like coupling to give the shortest possible leverage for high-torque uses. Industrial servomotors often use standardised mounting patterns, of which one example is a bolt circle of 4×130 mm diameter (approximately corresponds to a square pattern of 91.9 mm × 91.9 mm).

=== Vehicle wheels ===
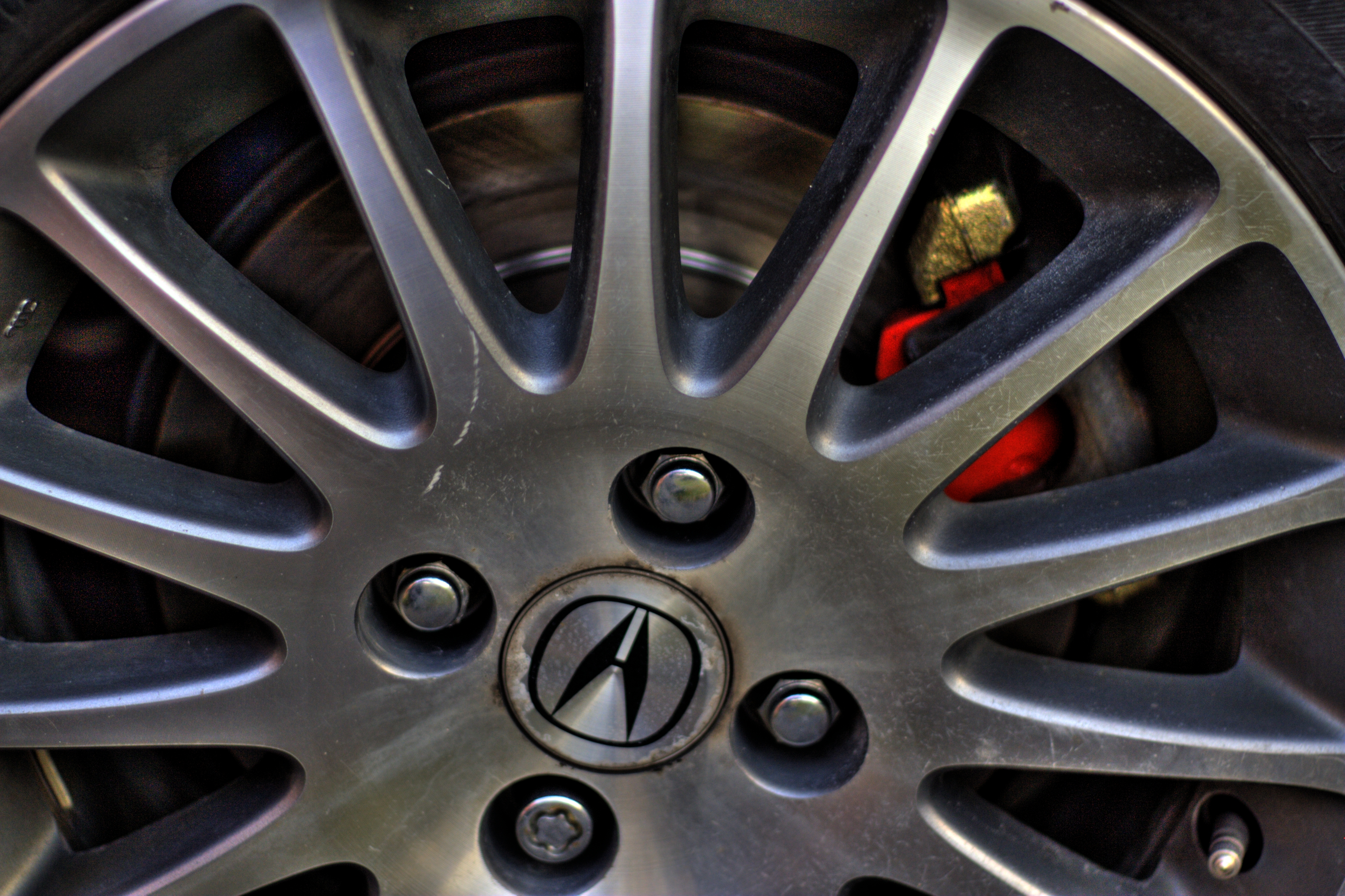
A bolt circle with four wheel nuts on an Acura.

The mounting pattern of most car wheels are described using bolt patterns, and this pattern is one of many factors which determine whether a wheel will fit a given car. Here, the bolt circle indicates the number of wheel nuts and associated hub bolts (or alternatively just wheel bolts).

An example of a bolt circle is 5×100 which indicates 5 nuts placed on a circle with a diameter of 100 mm. Some of the most common bolt circle diameters on modern cars are 100 mm, 112 mm and 114.3 mm. The bolt circle of a car is one of several parameters that must be checked before buying new wheels to make sure they will fit the car (along with wheel offset, hub diameter, and finally the diameter and width of the rim and tire). Over the years, over 30 different bolt circles patterns have been used by car manufacturers, most of which are not compatible with each other.

== See also ==
- Pitch diameter, a dimension of a screw thread
