= Rim Blow =

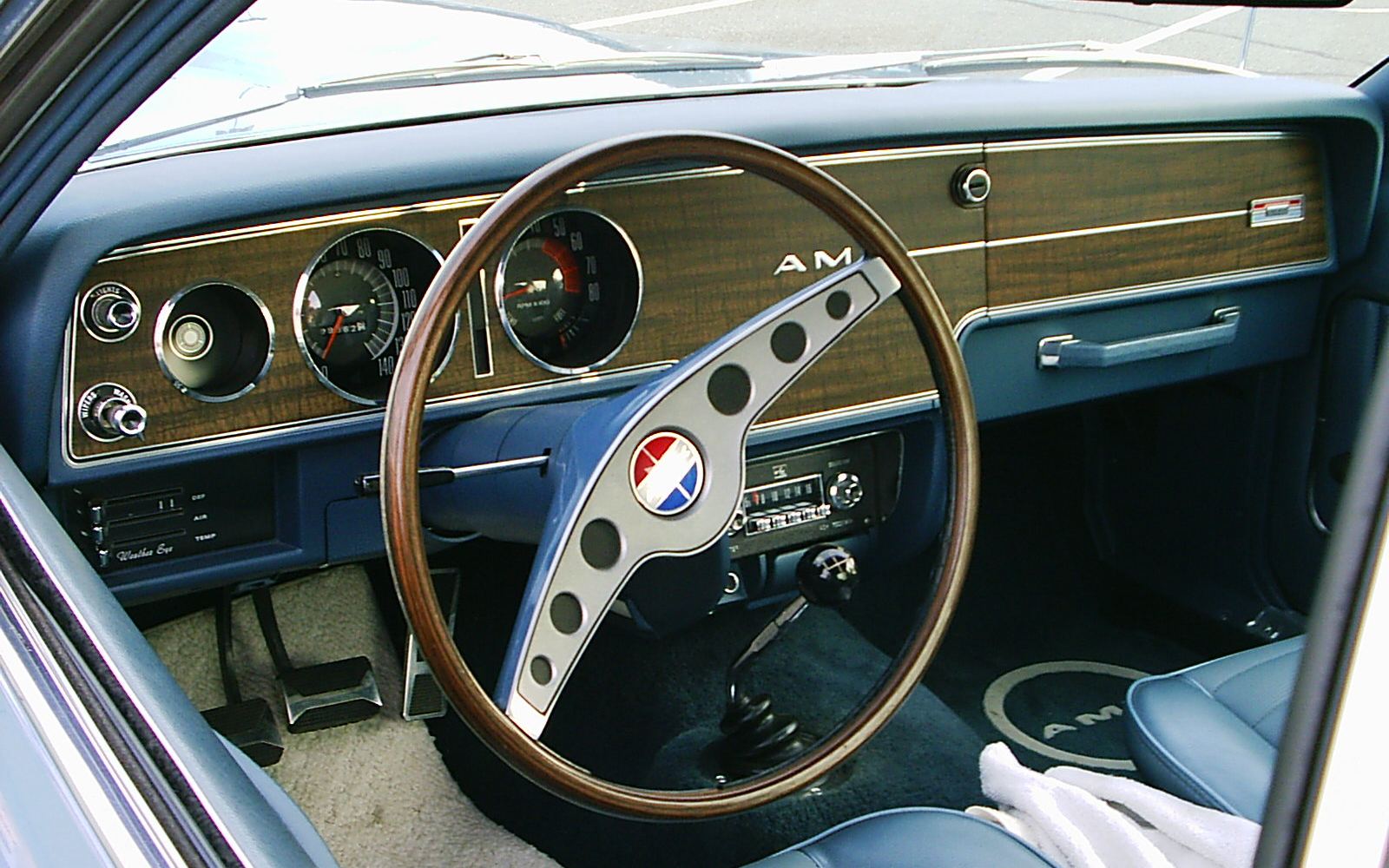
1970 AMC AMX with standard simulated wood-grained rim-blow steering wheel

Rim Blow was a type of steering wheel with no suspended horn ring or horn pad on the spokes that was featured on some automobiles built in the U.S. from 1969 to 1974. The inside of the rim could be depressed anywhere on its circumference to sound the horn.

== Design ==
The rim blow wheel was available in place of the traditional button-type or suspended ring used to activate the vehicle's horn. Some models such as the AMC AMX featured the new design as standard equipment, or it was optional such as on the compact AMC Hornet for an additional $37. A rubber pad encasing wires was mounted around the entire inner surface of the steering wheel rim. Rather than pressing a suspended horn ring, a center horn pad, or switches on the spokes, to make the electrical contact, the inside of the rim could be pressed anywhere on its circumference. Applying pressure to soft rubber inner rim of the steering wheel, a driver could activate the car's horn without moving their hands from the wheel rims.

Technical issues, such as hardening (difficult to activate) and shrinking (causing the horn to sound without activation) of the rubber, and a lack of customer acceptance led to the discontinuation of the rim blow steering wheels after only a few years.

It is possible to rebuild a vintage rim blow steering wheel.

== Dates of rim blow installation ==
- American Motors

AMC - 1970–1971

- Chrysler

Chrysler - 1970–1974
Dodge - 1970–1974
Plymouth - 1970–1973

- Ford

Ford - 1969–1974
Mercury - 1969–1974
Lincoln - 1970–1974

- General Motors

Cadillac - 1969
Buick - 1969–1971
Oldsmobile - 1969–1971
