= Horn ring =

Steering wheel accessory used to activate horn

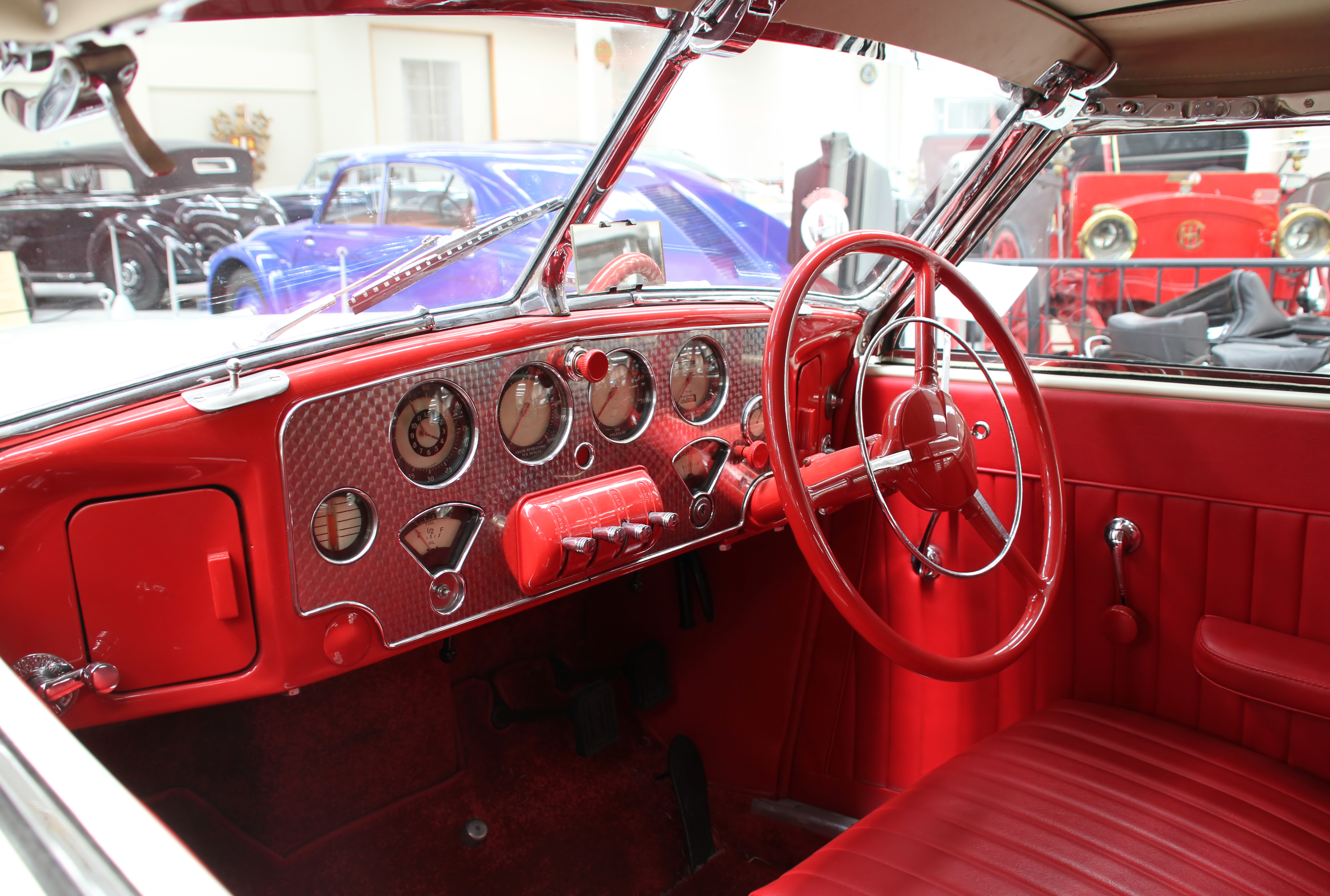
The interior of a 1937 Cord 810 with a red steering wheel equipped with a silver horn ring.

A horn ring is a circular or semi-circular metal or plastic ring attached to the spokes of an automobile steering wheel that closes the horn switch when pressed. First seen on luxury cars in the 1920s, it became near-universal from the 1940s through the early 1960s because it let the driver honk without removing a hand from the rim, and its chrome finish doubled as a styling cue. Common layouts included full-circle rings, “half-moon” rings that spanned only the lower spokes, and ornate designs integrated with horn buttons or trim medallions. The 1936 Cord 810 popularized the feature in the United States.

As designers pursued thinner hubs and, later, air-bag modules, manufacturers replaced horn rings with center pads, rim blows, and spoke-mounted buttons; by the late 1970s they survived mainly on trucks and some aftermarket wheels. Today horn rings are produced chiefly as reproduction parts for classic-car restorations and as niche accessories for custom interiors.
