= Steering wheel =

Type of steering control in land vehicles

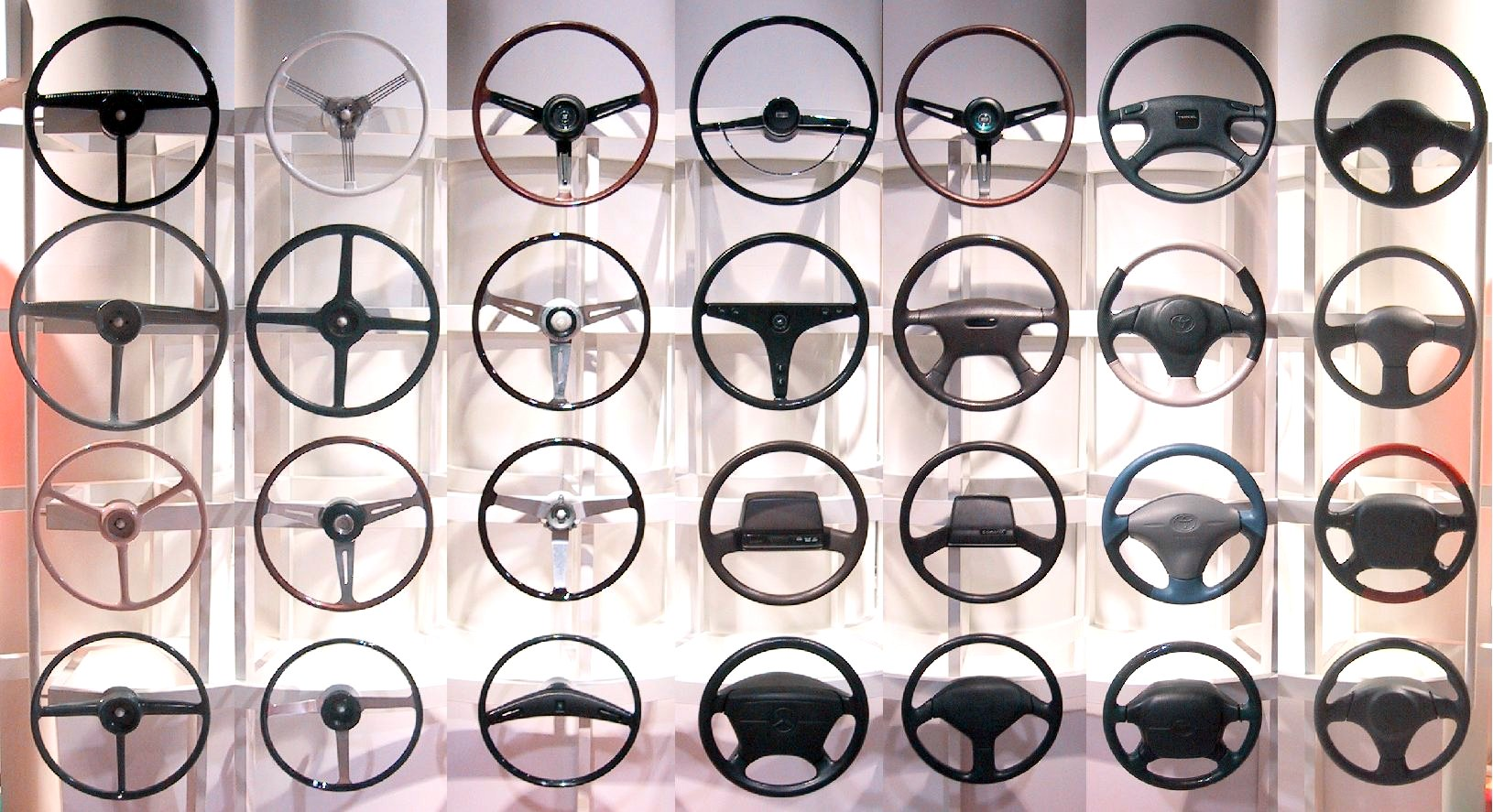
Passenger car steering wheels from different periods

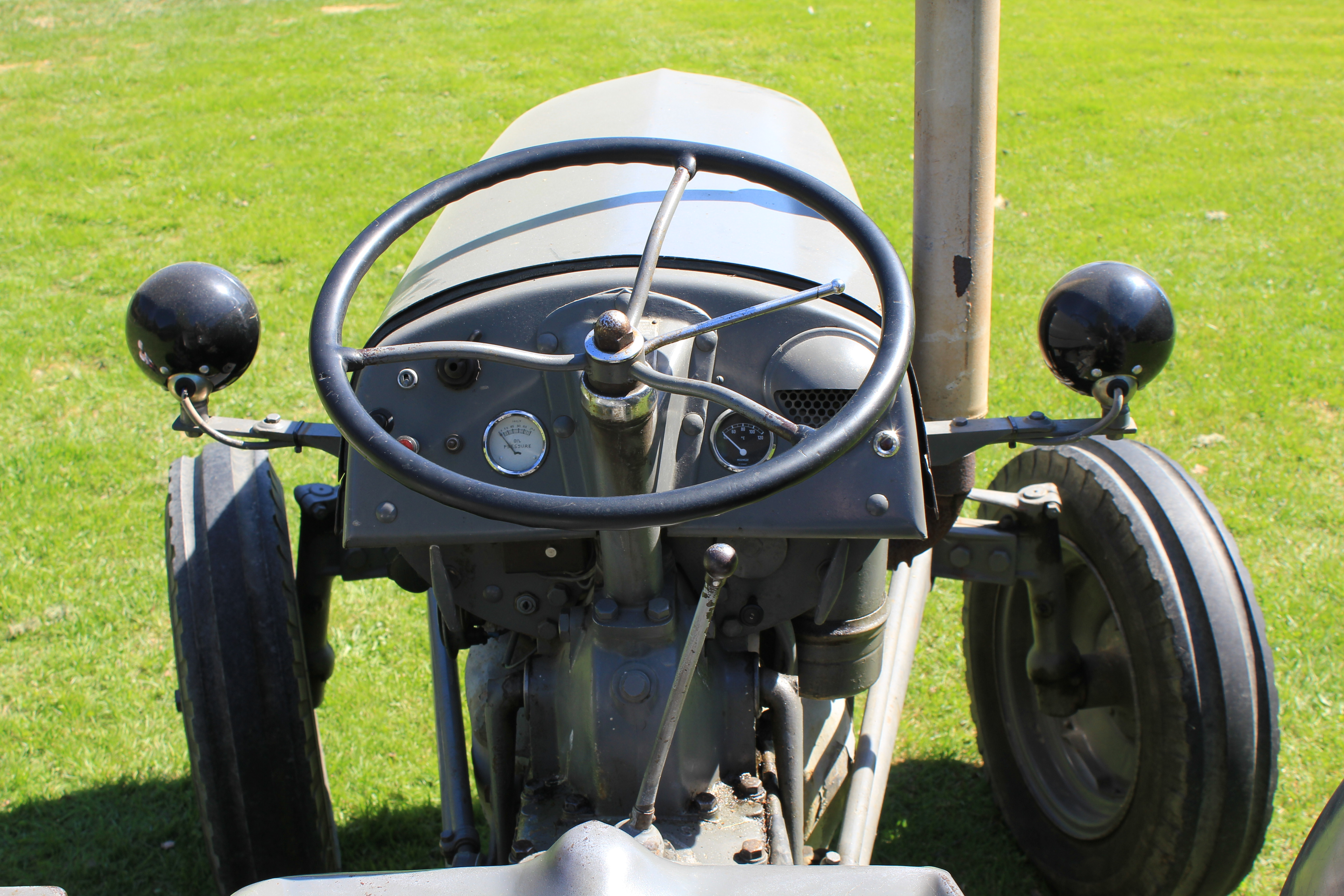
Steering wheel and front wheels of a farm tractor

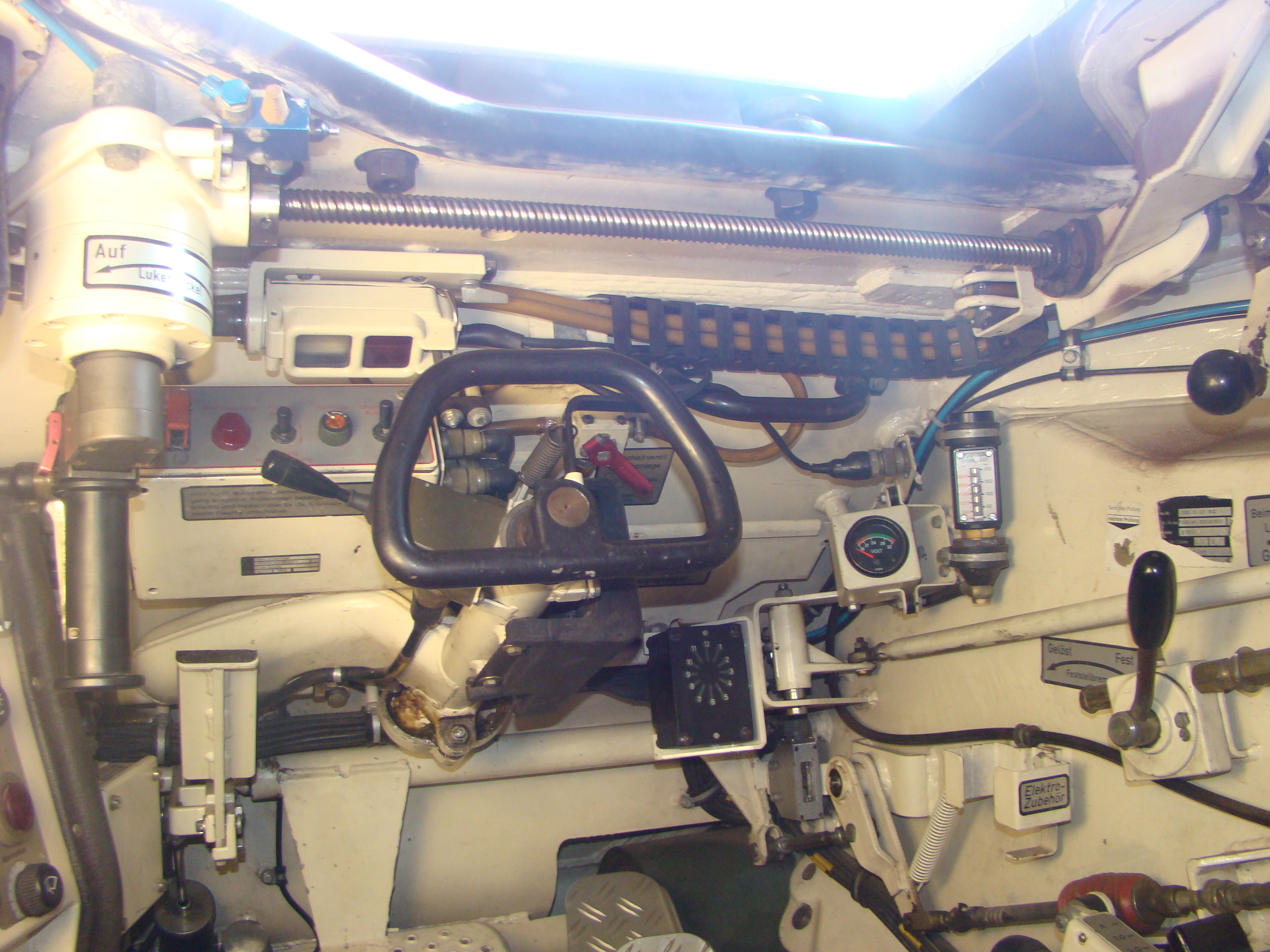
Steering wheel in a Leopard 2 tank

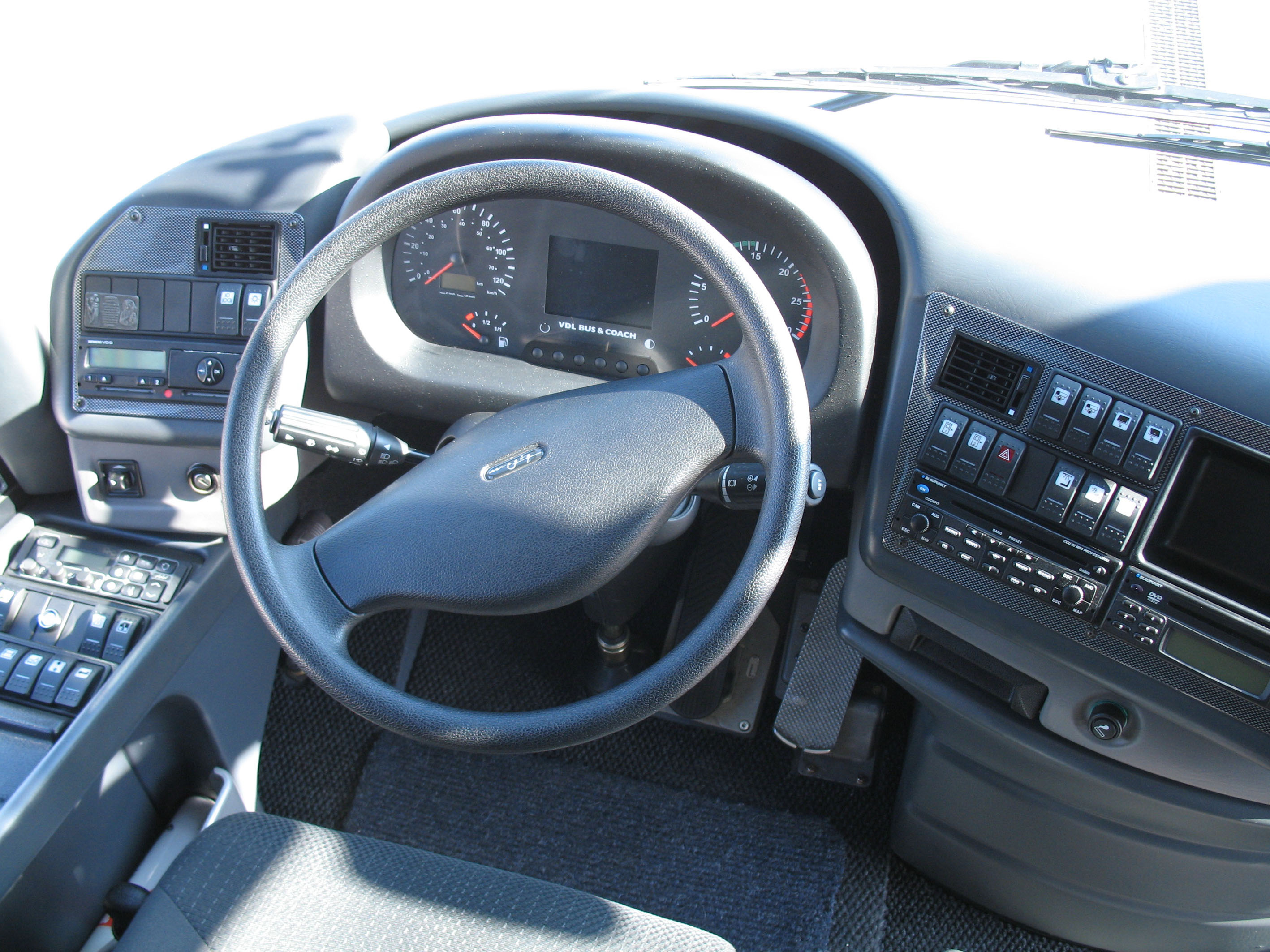
Steering wheel in a VDL Bova bus

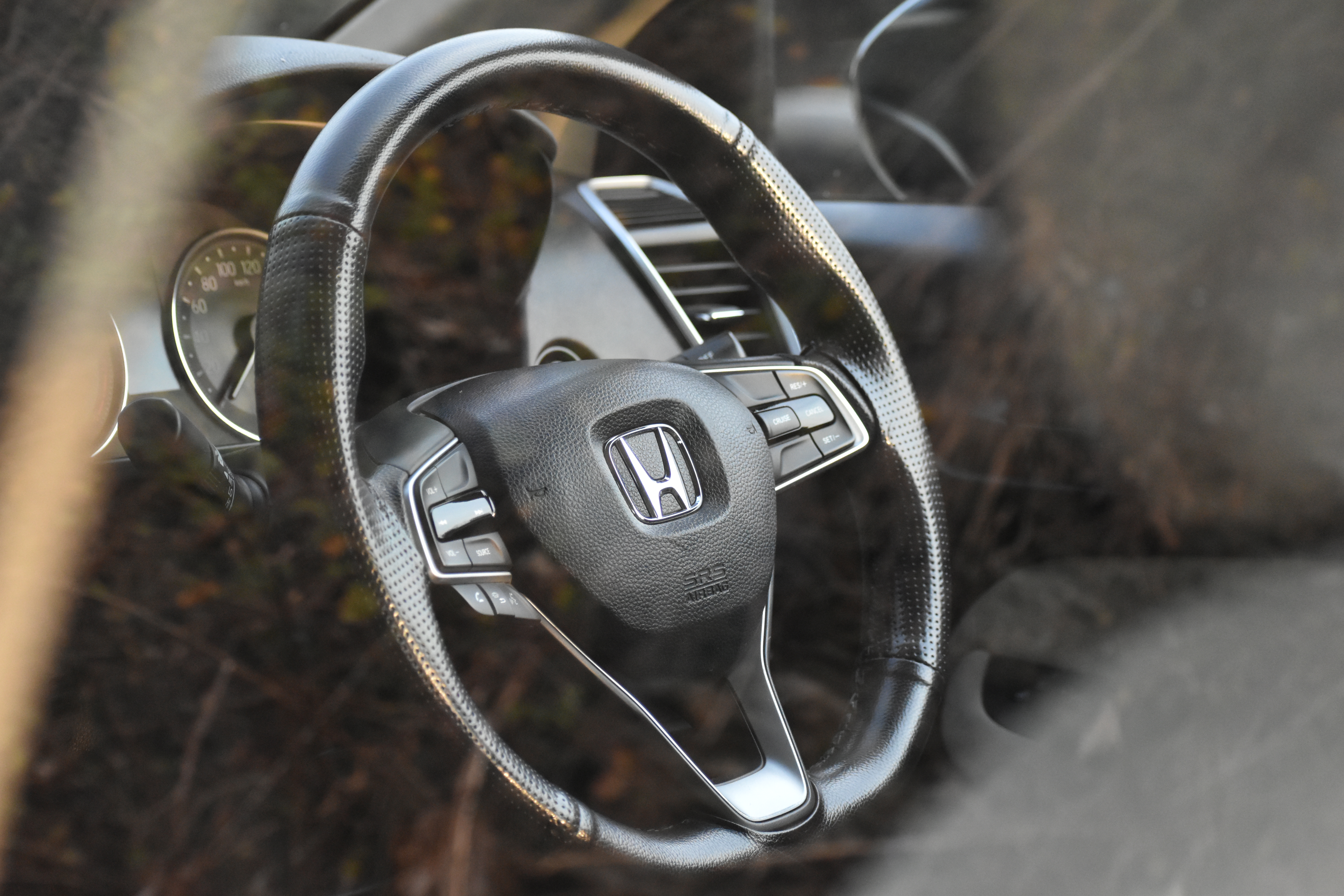
Steering Wheel of Honda City 7th Generation (5th Generation Sedan) iVTEC 2022

A steering wheel (also called a driving wheel, a hand wheel, or simply wheel) is a type of steering control in vehicles.

Steering wheels are used in most modern land vehicles, including all mass-production automobiles, buses, light and heavy trucks, as well as tractors and tanks. The steering wheel is the part of the steering system that the driver manipulates; the rest of the steering system responds to such driver inputs. This can be through direct mechanical contact, as in recirculating ball or rack and pinion steering gears, with or without the assistance of hydraulic power steering (HPS), or, in some modern production cars, with the help of computer-controlled motors, known as electric power steering.

== History ==
Near the start of the 18th century, many sea vessels appeared with the ship's wheel design. In the early nineteenth century the first successful efforts were made to apply steam power to transport. In the 1820s and 1830s engineers created steam-powered road vehicles as well as rail. (Note: Hebert's article is titled "Railways" but it covers steam carriages as well, so closely were the two related.) They needed to be steered and the most common approach was to have a vertical spindle with a mechanism at the bottom which moved the steered wheels. (Note: See the diagrams in Hebert's Railways article cited. This follows from the geometry involved: the steering pivot has a vertical axis and is lower in the vehicle than the steersman. The only alternative is an oblique pole from the steersman to the pivot some way forward or back, i.e. a tiller.) At the top of the spindle was something which the steersman could hold and turn.

Gordon's archetypal steam drag of 1834 with a steering wheel

In the first British steam carriage of this period, Julius Griffiths' carriage of 1821, it was a horizontal bar with vertical handles at each end (as used on Peugeot cars of the early 1890s). Others, notably Walter Hancock in his steam omnibuses, used a wheel. In 1834 Alexander Gordon reviewed the state of the art in road vehicles and proposed an archetypal steam drag, a small vehicle to tow others. This blended the best features of then-available technology. It included a steering wheel and a throttle pedal.

Passenger-carrying road locomotive with ship's wheel by Lotz of Nantes, 1865

Steering wheel of Bollée's L'Obéissante steam omnibus,1873

Most steam road locomotives from the 1850s onwards used a vertical (ship's) wheel if the driver stood or a horizontal one if the driver sat. Amédée Bollée used a horizontal steering wheel on all his vehicles from L'Obéissante (1873) onwards. By 1890 steering wheels with an inclined axis had become standard on traction engines.

Steering handle on fixed horizontal wheel on 1894 Benz Velo

On all his cars to 1900, Carl Benz used a small fixed horizontal wheel with a centrally pivoted steering handle (see photograph). (Note: Unlike a tiller system, Benz's steering handle turned a shaft, at the lower end of which was a pinion which acted on twin racks which controlled the steering. A pointer opposite the steering handle pointed the direction the vehicle would go; see William Worby Beaumont: Motor Vehicles and Motors (1900), pp.123,134-135.) Peugeot and (German) Daimler mostly used steering handles. Panhard et Levassor was an influential exception in using a tiller, but in 1894, Alfred Vacheron took part in the Paris–Rouen race on a 4 hp Panhard in which he had installed an inclined steering wheel. That is believed to be the first application of a steering wheel in an internal-combustion-engined car.

From 1898, the Panhard et Levassor cars were equipped with steering wheels as standard. Charles Rolls introduced the first car in Britain fitted with a steering wheel when he imported a 6 hp Panhard from France in 1898. Arthur Constantin Krebs replaced the tiller with an inclined steering wheel for the Panhard car he designed for the 1898 Paris–Amsterdam–Paris race, which ran 7–13 July 1898.

In 1898, Thomas B. Jeffery and his son, Charles T. Jeffery, developed two advanced experimental cars featuring a front-mounted engine and a steering wheel mounted on the left-hand side. However, the early automaker adopted a more "conventional" rear-engine and tiller-steering layout for its first mass-produced Ramblers in 1902. The following year, the Rambler Model E was largely unchanged, except that it came equipped with a tiller early in the year that was changed to a steering wheel by the end of 1903. By 1904, all Ramblers featured steering wheels. Within a decade, the steering wheel had entirely replaced the tiller in automobiles.

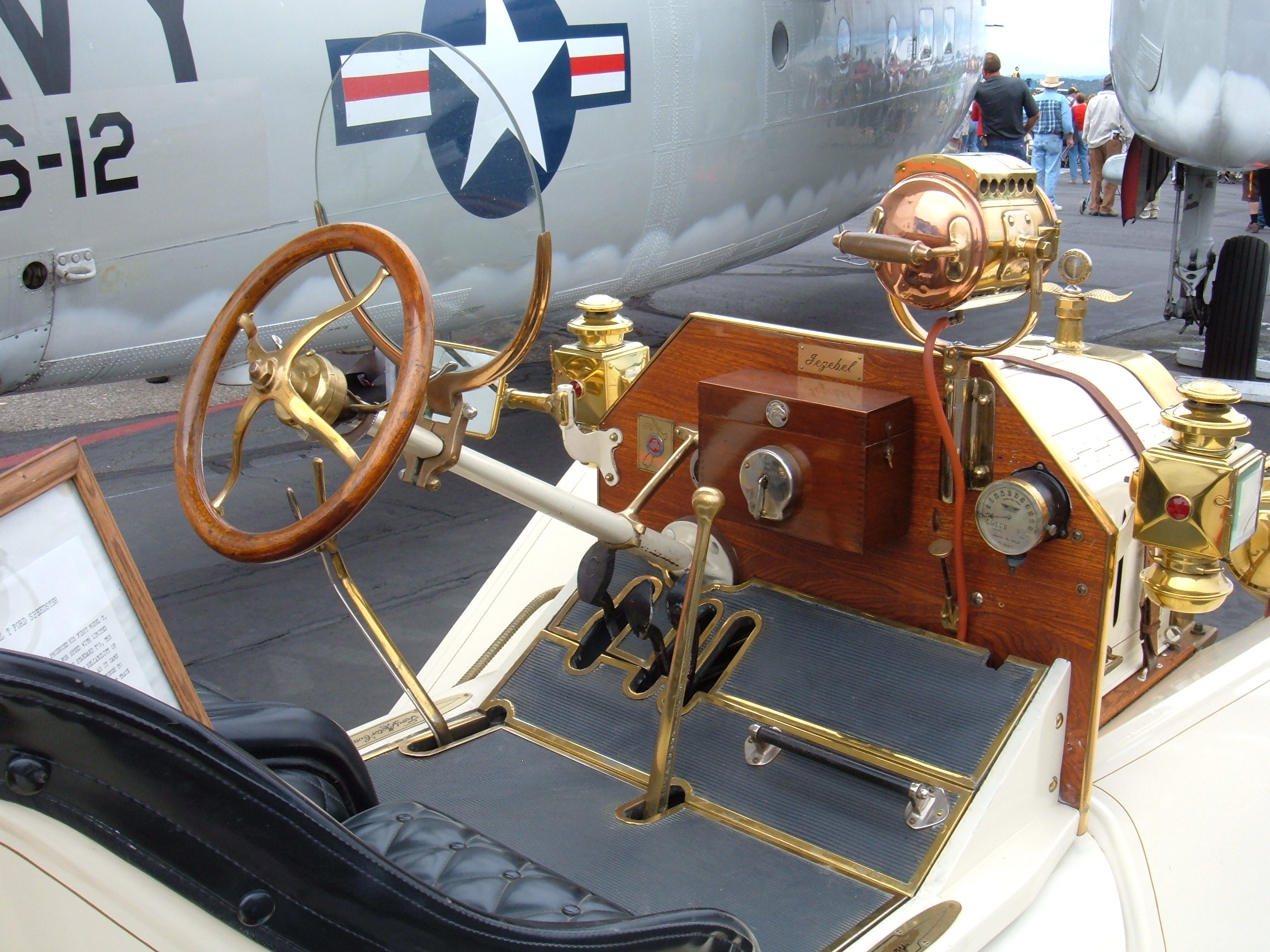
1913 Ford Model T Speedster with rigid steering column and four-spoke wooden steering wheel

At the insistence of Thomas B. Jeffery, the driver's position was also moved to the left-hand side of the car during the 1903 Rambler production. Most other car makers began offering cars with left-hand drive in 1910. Soon after, most cars assembled in the United States converted to left-hand drive.

== Placement in vehicle ==
The placement within the vehicle will vary depending on the driver's location. Some vehicles might have the driver located in the center, with no accommodations for passengers on either side. Other vehicles, such as buses and delivery vans, move the driver to one side.

When the driver's position is moved to one side, it is typically the side of the vehicle closer to the opposite lane of travel.

When vehicles operate in left side traffic, the driver and steering wheel are typically on the vehicle's right (right-hand drive or RHD); the converse applies to vehicles that operate in right-side traffic (left-hand drive or LHD).

== Shapes ==
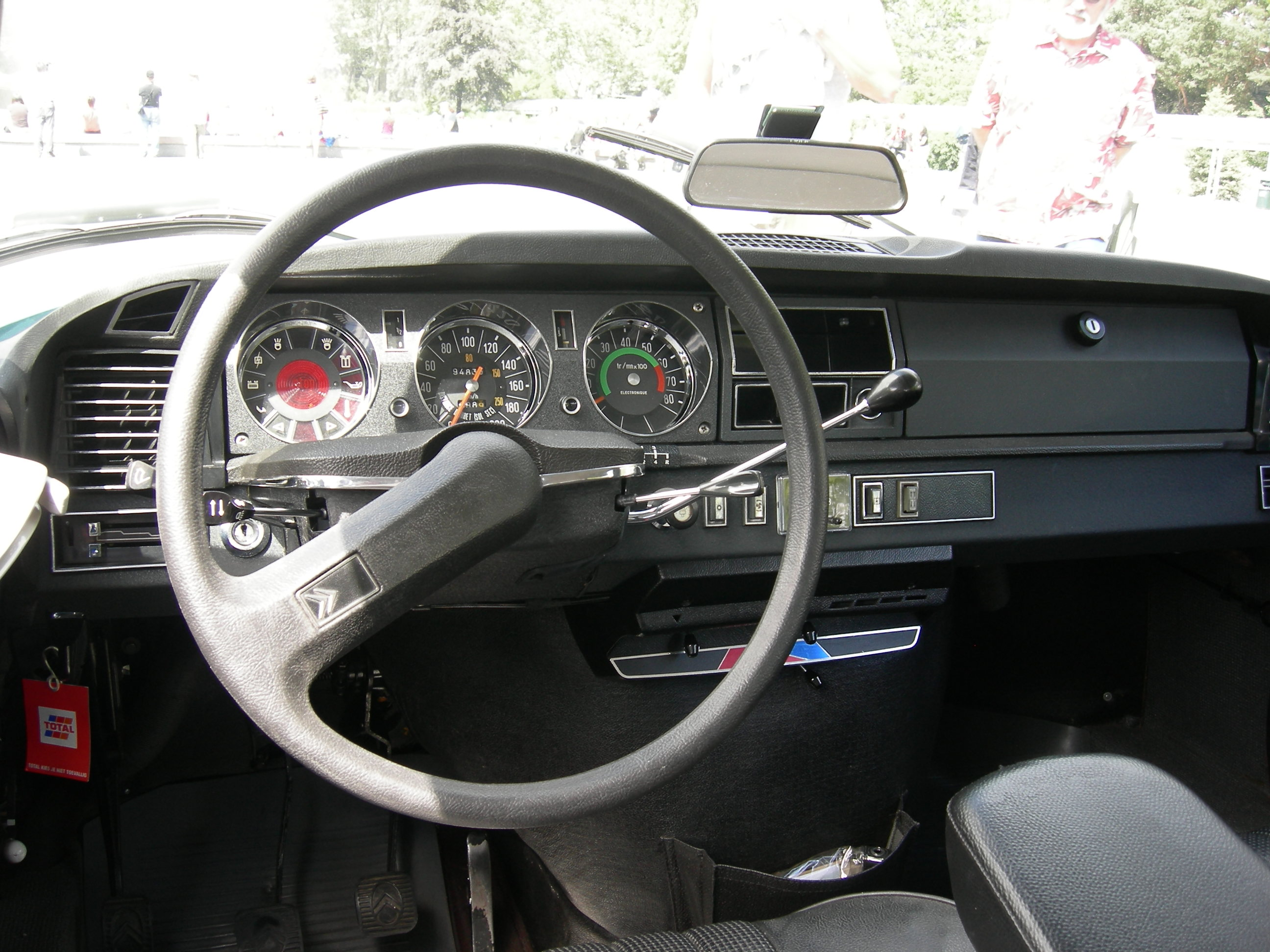
1974 Citroën DS single spoke safety steering wheel

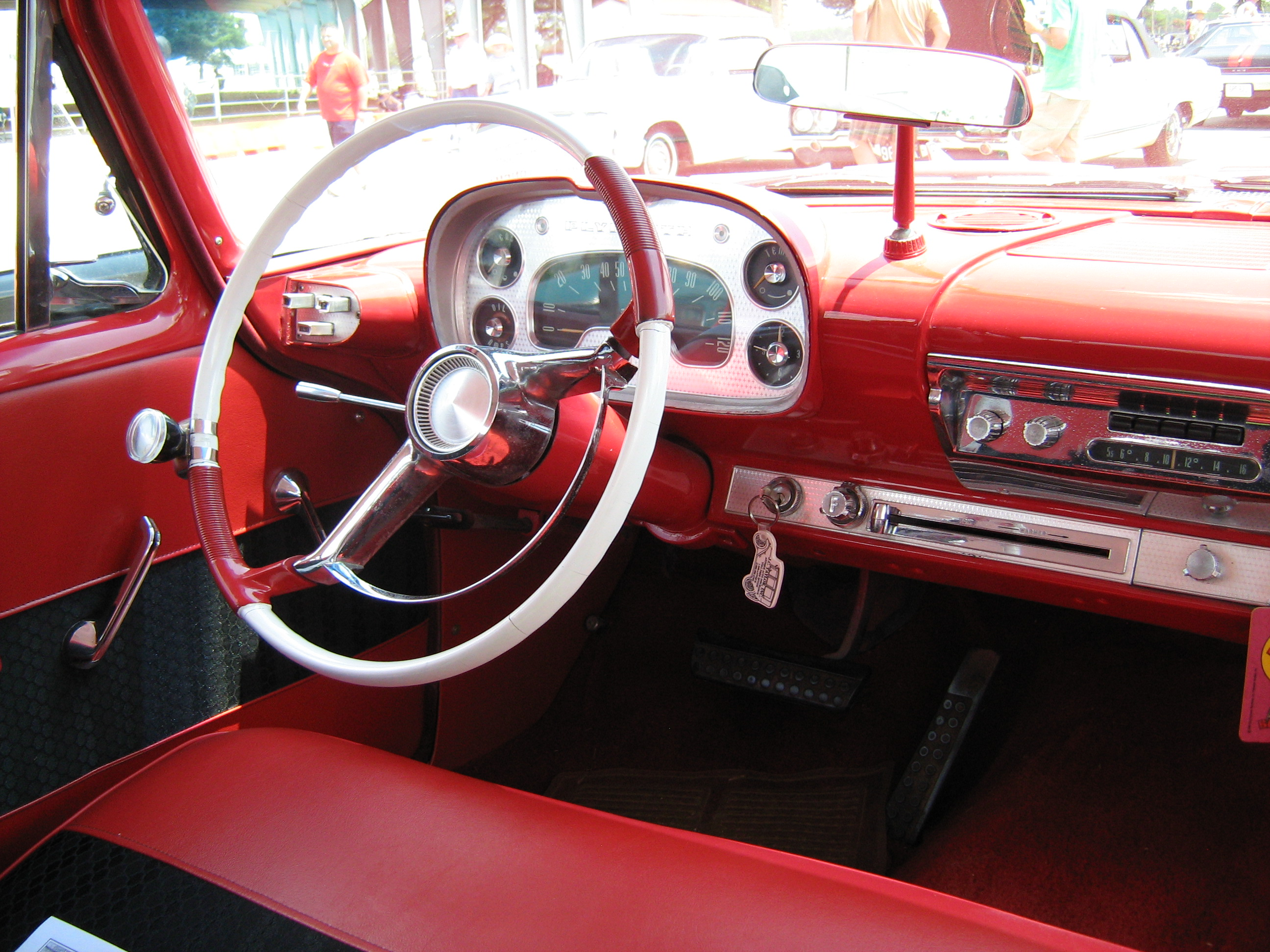
1958 Plymouth Savoy showing two-spoke steering wheel with horn ring, and aftermarket brodie knob, or steering wheel spinner

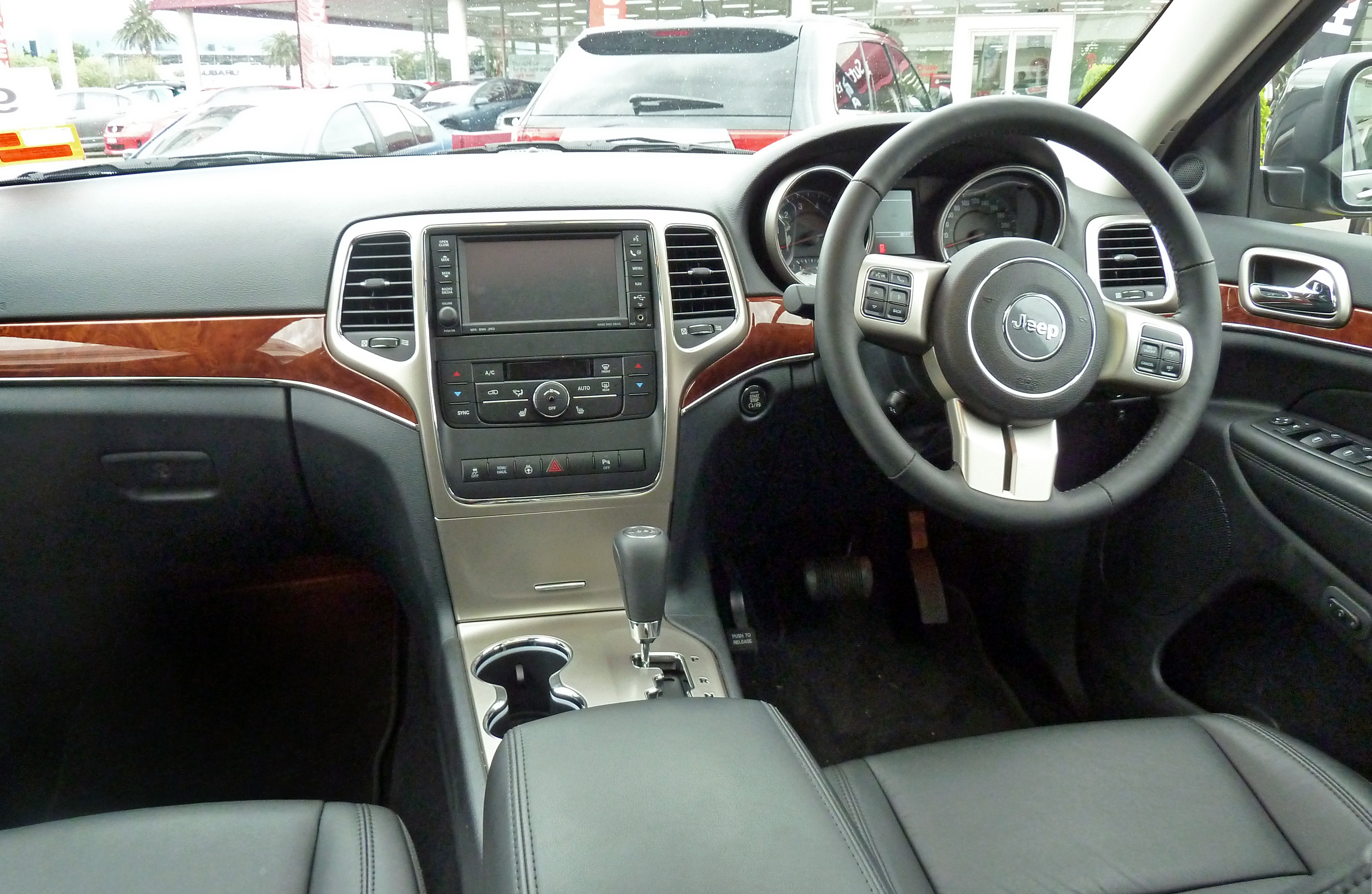
A RHD-mounted three-spoke wheel with airbag, as well as audio and cruise control buttons

Steering wheels for land vehicles are generally circular. They are mounted to the steering column by a hub connected to the outer ring of the steering wheel by one or more spokes (single-spoke wheels being a relatively rare exception). Other types of vehicles may use a modified circular design, a butterfly shape, or some other shape, such as a yoke.

On some Tesla models, the steering control is through a yoke rectangle shaped with rounded edges and two pistol grips.

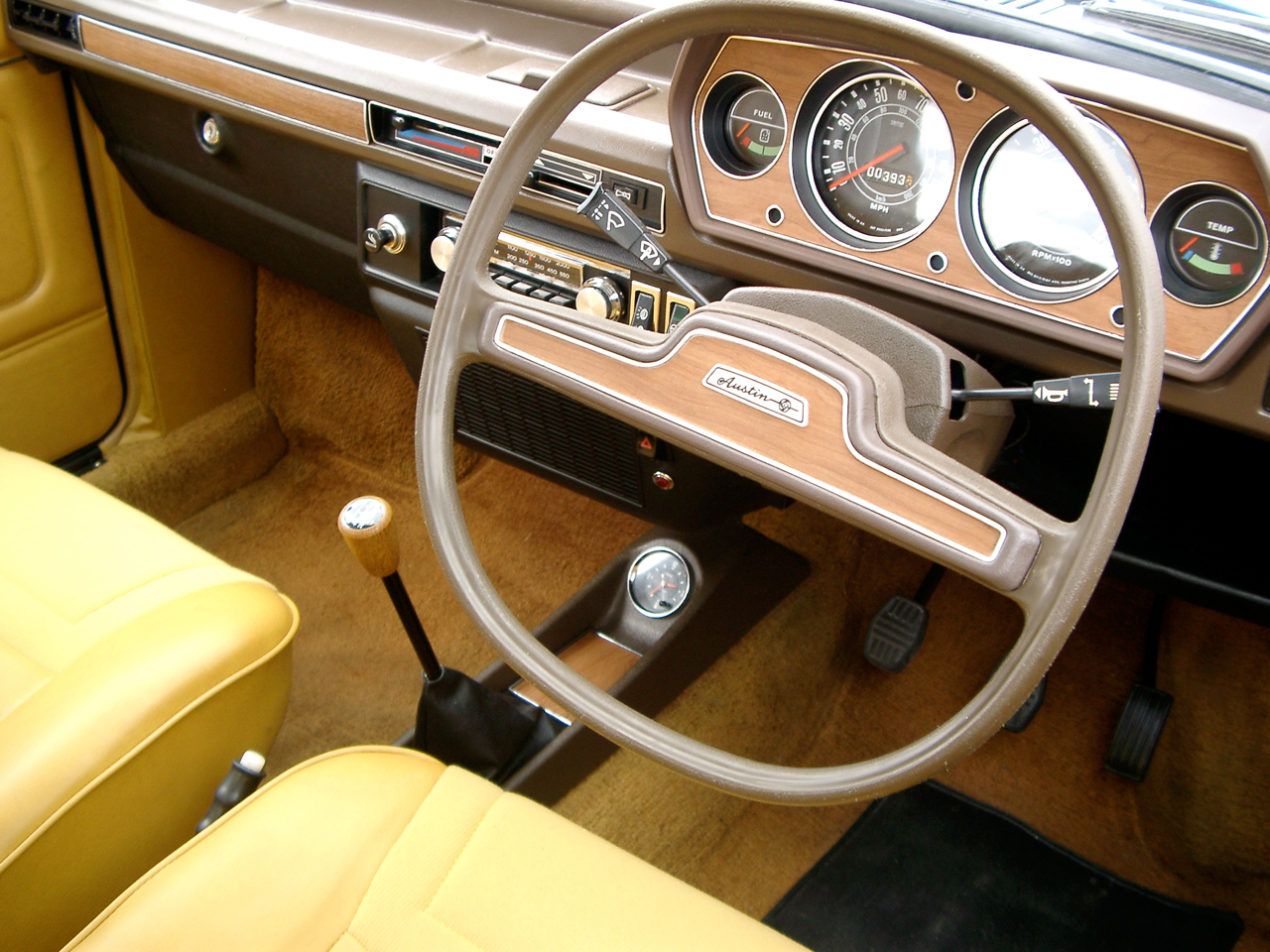
Quartic steering wheel as featured in the Austin Allegro at launch in 1973

When the Austin Allegro was launched in 1973 it had a "quartic" steering wheel. It was unpopular and was dropped in 1974. The Chevrolet Corvette (C8) includes a square-type steering wheel with rounded corners, described as a 'squircle'. The objective of the flat bottom is to ease driver egress, while the flattened top enhances the line of sight when driving.

General Motors applied for a United States patent for a modular steering control that can be updated with components or changed in shape, ranging from a traditional circle to a yoke.

== Other controls ==
In addition to serving to maneuver the vehicle, the steering wheel and its column are the often the usual locations for driver-activated controls such as the horn, turn signals, and wipers.

The steering wheel may provide a location for controls that permit the driver to keep their hands on the wheel while using their fingers to touch switches or knobs for features such as cruise control, audio system, and telephone operation, as well as paddle shifters.

== Driver safety ==
Steering wheels that were rigid and mounted on non-collapsible steering columns increased the risk of impaling the driver in a severe crash. The first collapsible steering column was invented in 1934, but was never successfully marketed. By 1956, Ford introduced a safety steering wheel mounted high above the post, with spokes that would flex; however, the column was rigid. In 1968, United States regulations (FMVSS Standard No. 204) were implemented concerning the acceptable rearward movement of the steering wheel in case of a crash. Collapsible steering columns were required to meet that standard. Before this invention, the Citroën DS incorporated a curved and off-center single-spoke steering wheel designed to deflect the driver from the steering column in case of a crash.

An airbag is another driver safety component installed within the steering wheel to minimize injury from the driver's head or body contacting the steering wheel during a vehicle collision.

== Power steering ==
Augmented, or power steering, affords the driver reduced effort to steer the car. Modern power steering has almost universally relied on a hydraulic system, although electrical systems are steadily replacing this technology. Mechanical power steering systems were introduced, such as on 1953 Studebakers. However, hydraulically assisted systems have prevailed.

While other methods of steering passenger cars have resulted from experiments, for example, the "wrist-twist" steering of the 1965 Mercury Park Lane concept car was controlled by two 5-inch (127 mm) rings, none have yet been deployed as successfully as the conventional large steering wheel.

== Steering wheel locks ==
Passenger automobile regulations implemented by the U.S. Department of Transportation required the locking of steering wheel rotation (or transmission locked in "park") to hinder motor vehicle theft; in most vehicles, this is accomplished when the ignition key is removed from the ignition lock. See steering lock.

=== Other designs ===
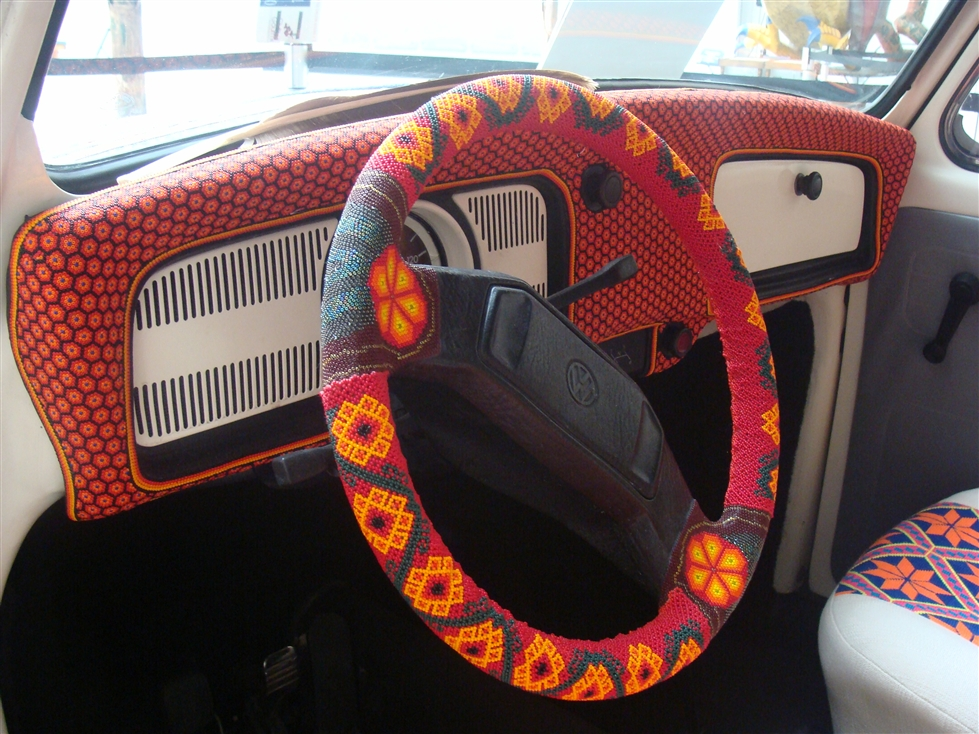
Cheerful steering wheel cover on a two-spoke Volkswagen Beetle steering wheel

The driver's seat and steering wheel are centrally located on certain high-performance sports cars, such as the McLaren F1, and most single-seat racing cars.

As drivers may continuously have their hands on the steering wheel for many hours, these are designed with ergonomics in mind. However, the most crucial concern is that the driver can effectively convey torque to the steering system, especially in vehicles without power steering or in the rare event of a loss of steering assist. A typical design for circular steering wheels is a steel or magnesium rim with a plastic or rubberized grip molded over and around it. Some drivers purchase vinyl or textile steering wheel covers to enhance grip and comfort or simply as decoration. Another accessory that may make steering easier is the Brodie knob.

A similar device in aircraft is the yoke. Water vessels not steered from a stern-mounted tiller are directed with the ship's wheel, which may have inspired the concept of the steering wheel. The steering wheel is better than other user interfaces and has persisted because driving requires precise feedback that is provided by a large interface.

Early Formula One cars used steering wheels taken directly from road cars. They were normally made from wood. Without interior cabin packaging constraints, they tended to be made as large a diameter as possible to reduce the effort needed to turn. As cars grew progressively lower and driver's areas more compact throughout the 1960s and 1970s, steering wheels became smaller to fit into the interior space.

=== Spokes in steering wheel ===
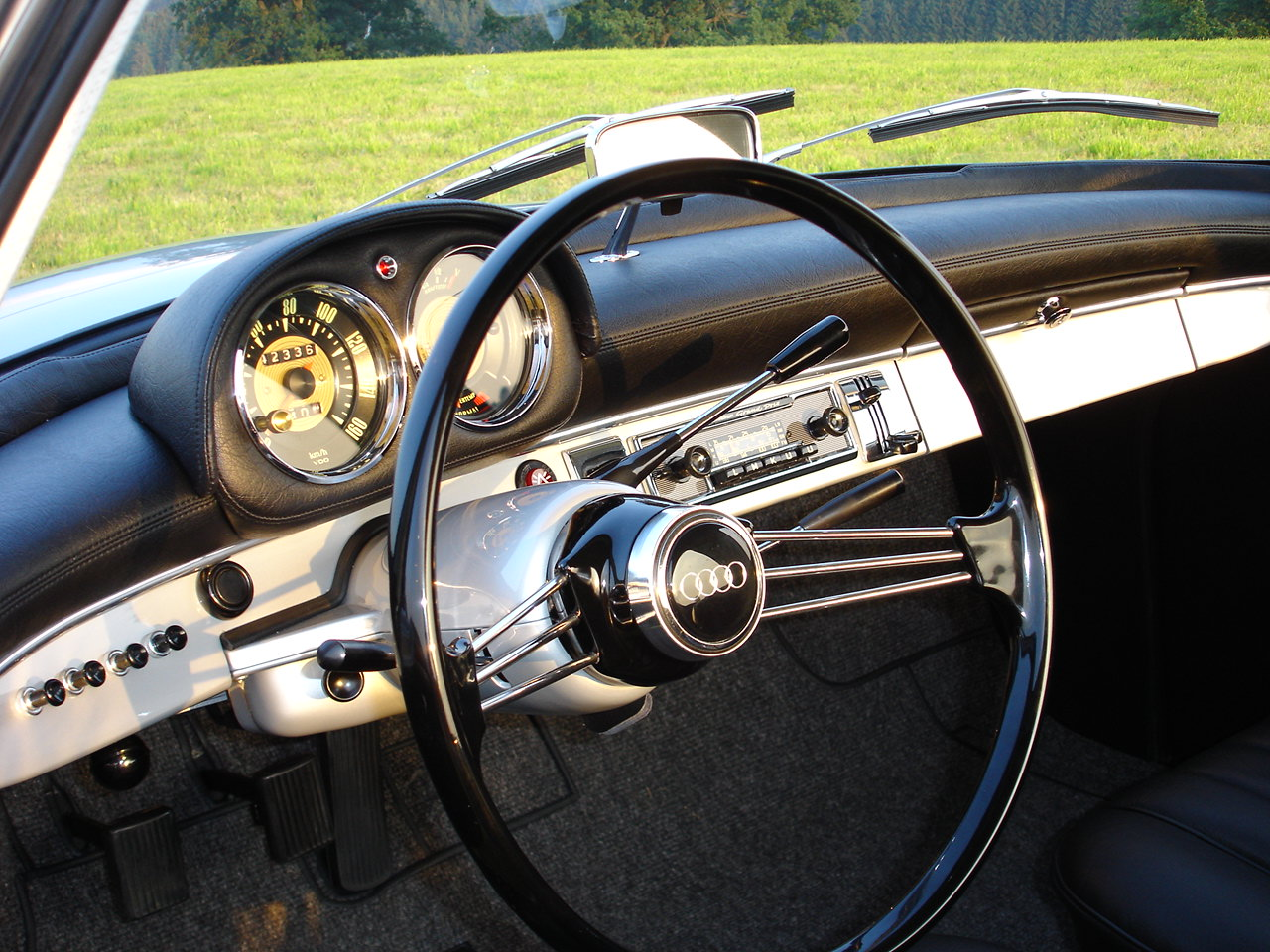
Banjo steering wheel in 1956 DKW Monza

The number of spokes in the steering wheel has continuously changed. Most early cars had four-spoke steering wheels.

A Banjo steering wheel was an option in early automobiles. They predate power steering.The wire spokes served as a buffer or absorber between the driver's hands and the vibration transmitted by the road surface. Most were three- or four-spoke designs, made of four or five wires in each spoke, hence the name "Banjo".

== Adjustable steering wheels ==
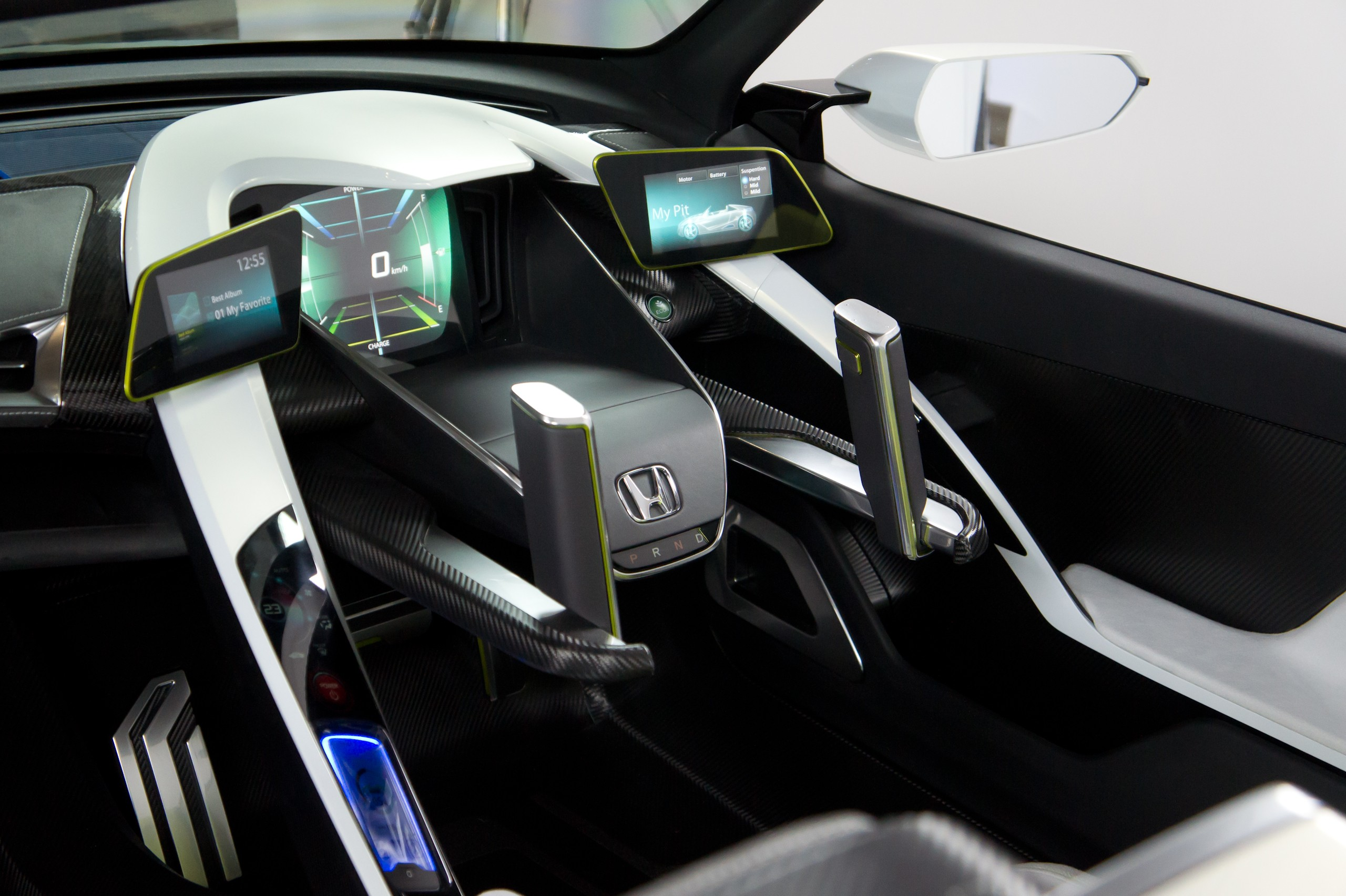
2012 Honda EV-STER "Twin Lever Steering"

=== Tilt wheel ===
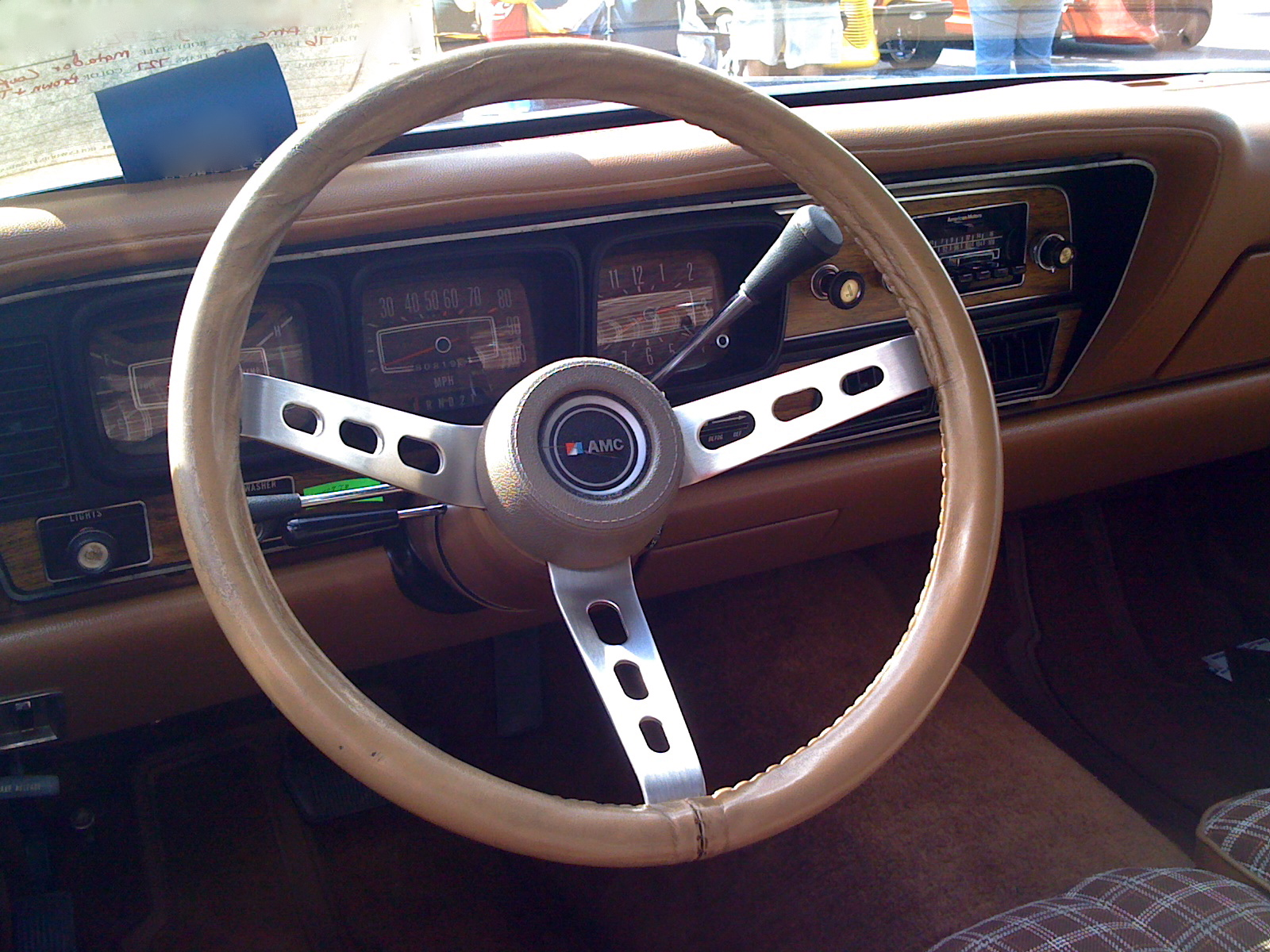
Adjustable three-spoke steering wheel on a collapsible column in an AMC Matador from the 1970s

Edward James Lobdell developed the original tilt wheel in the early 1900s. A seven-position tilt wheel was introduced by the Saginaw Division of General Motors as an option for all 1963 model year passenger car divisions except Chevrolet, which made the tilt wheel available in 1964. This tilt wheel was also supplied for use in cars made by Chrysler and American Motors (AMC).

Originally a luxury option on cars, the tilt function helps to adjust the steering wheel by it through an arc in an up-and-down motion. Tilt steering wheels rely upon a ratchet joint located in the steering column just below the steering wheel. The wheel can be adjusted upward or downward by disengaging the ratchet lock while the steering column remains stationary below the joint. Some designs place the pivot slightly forward along the column, allowing for a fair amount of vertical movement of the steering wheel with slight actual tilt. Other designs place the pivot almost inside the steering wheel, allowing adjustment of the steering wheel's angle with nearly no change in its height.

=== Adjustable steering column ===
An adjustable steering column allows the steering wheel height to be adjusted with only a small, useful change in tilt. Most of these systems use compression locks or electric motors instead of ratchet mechanisms; the latter may be capable of moving to a memorized position when a given driver uses the car, or of automatically moving up and forward to ease egress.

=== Telescope wheel ===
Many pre-war British cars offered telescoping steering wheels that required loosening a locknut before adjustment, many using the Douglas ASW (Adjustable Steering Wheel). In 1949, the Jaguar XK120 introduced a new steering wheel supplied by Bluemel that was driver-adjustable by loosening a sleeve around the column by hand. The 1955-1957 Ford Thunderbird had a similar design with 3 inches (76 mm) of total travel. In 1956, the travel was restricted to 2 inches (51 mm). A patent was filed regarding a telescoping steering wheel in July 1942 by Bernard Maurer of the Saginaw Steering Gear Division of General Motors (now Nexteer Automotive). Nevertheless, GM would not offer a telescoping wheel of their own until the debut of the optional telescopic wheel on the 1965 Corvette and Corvair, and the optional tilt/telescope wheel on 1965 Cadillacs. The GM column was released by twisting a locking ring surrounding the center hub, offering a 3-inch (76 mm) range of adjustment.

=== Swing-away steering wheel ===
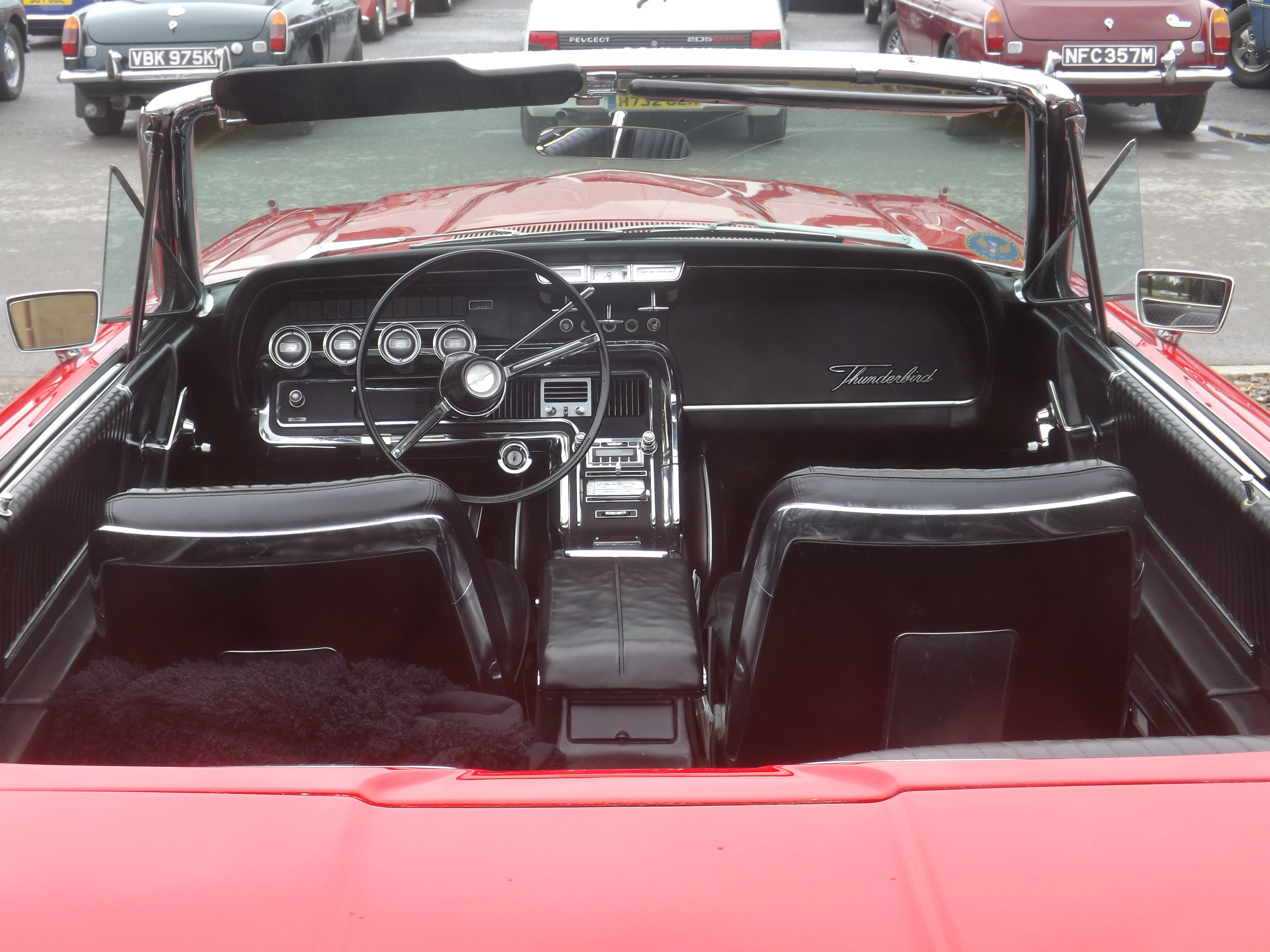
Ford Thunderbird steering column "swung" to the right

A swing-away steering column was introduced in the 1961 Ford Thunderbird and made available on other Ford products during the 1960s. The swing-away steering wheel allowed the steering wheel to move 9 inches (229 mm) to the right when the transmission selector was in the "park" position to make the driver's exit and entry easier.

=== Tilt-away steering wheel ===
A tilt-away wheel was introduced by Ford in 1967 after updates to Federal Motor Vehicle Safety Standards requirements. Though it was an update to the swing-away steering wheel, which did not meet updated safety standards, it offers limited movement but added convenience due to the automatic pop-over function over its predecessor.

=== Quick release hub steering wheel ===
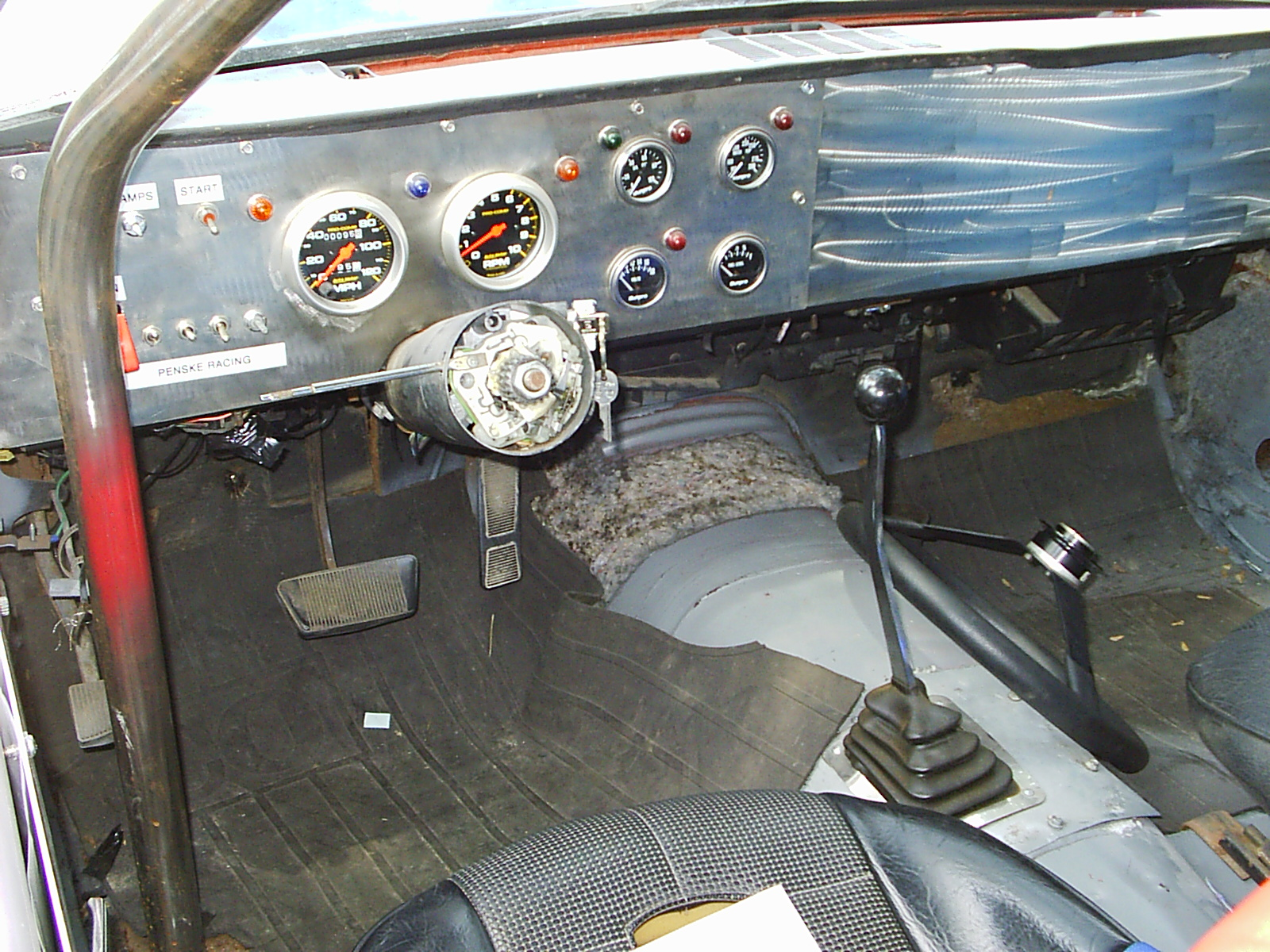
Quick release hub and the detached steering wheel on the floor, used mainly in race cars

Some steering wheels can be mounted on a detachable or a quick-release hub. The steering wheel can be removed without using tools by pressing a button. The system is often found in narrow-spaced racing cars to facilitate the driver getting in and out, as well as in other cars as an anti-theft device. The quick-release connector is often brand-specific, with some makes being interchangeable. The most common mounting pattern is 6×70 mm, which denotes a bolt circle pattern with six bolts placed along a circle 70 mm in diameter. Other examples of common bolt patterns are 3×1.75 in (44.45 mm), 5×2.75 in (69.85 mm), 6×74 mm and 6×2.75 in (69.85 mm). The quick release itself is often proprietary.

== Usage ==
The steering wheel should be used with strategic movements of the hand and wrist in spinning motions. Caution and care should be used to ensure the safety of the extremities. The constant motions used must be performed with caution. "Proper posture of the hand-arm system while using hand tools is essential. As a rule, the wrist should not be bent, but must be kept straight to avoid overexertion of tissues like tendons and tendon sheaths and compression of nerves and blood vessels."

Turning the steering wheel while the vehicle is stationary is called dry steering. It is generally advisable to avoid dry steering, as it strains the steering mechanism and causes undue wear on the tires.

== History of integrated buttons and controls ==
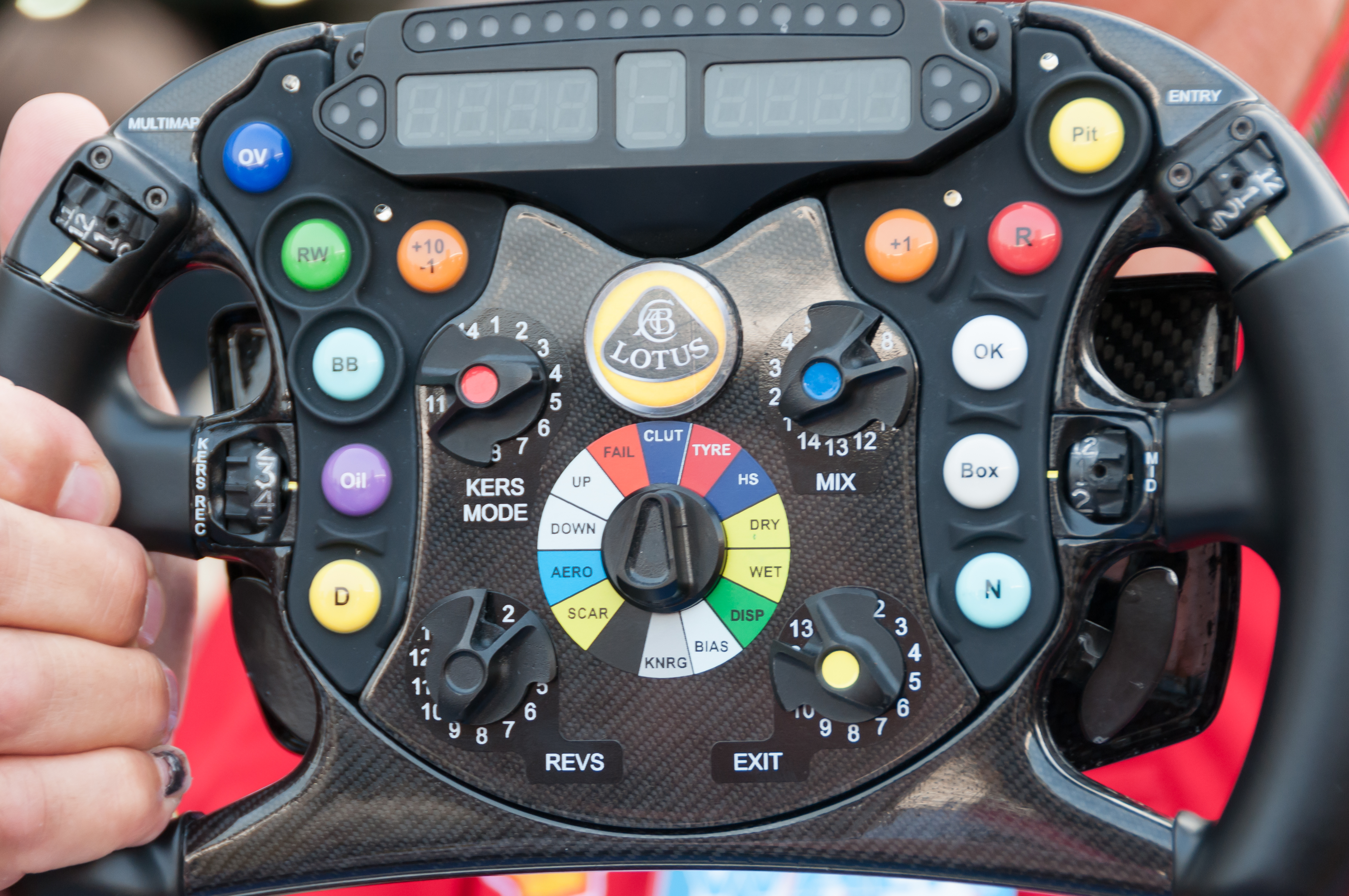
A 2012 Formula One car's steering wheel, with buttons and knobs to control various functions as well as gauges and other essential items normally found on a dashboard

The first button added to the steering wheel was a switch to activate the car's electric horn. Traditionally located on the steering wheel hub or center pad, the horn switch was sometimes placed on the spokes or activated via a decorative horn ring, thereby obviating the need to move a hand away from the rim. Electrical connections are made via a slip ring. A further development, the Rim Blow steering wheel, integrated the horn switch into the steering wheel rim.

In 1966, Ford offered the Highway Pilot Speed Control option with steering wheel pad-mounted rocker switches on the Thunderbird. Uniquely, the Thunderbird also lightly applied the brakes and illuminated the stop lamps when the Retard was continuously depressed with the cruise control on, but not engaged.

In 1974, Lincoln added two rocker switches on the steering wheel to activate various cruise control functions on the Continental and Continental Mark IV. In 1988, Pontiac offered a steering wheel with 12 buttons controlling various audio functions on the Trans-Am, 6000 STE and Bonneville.

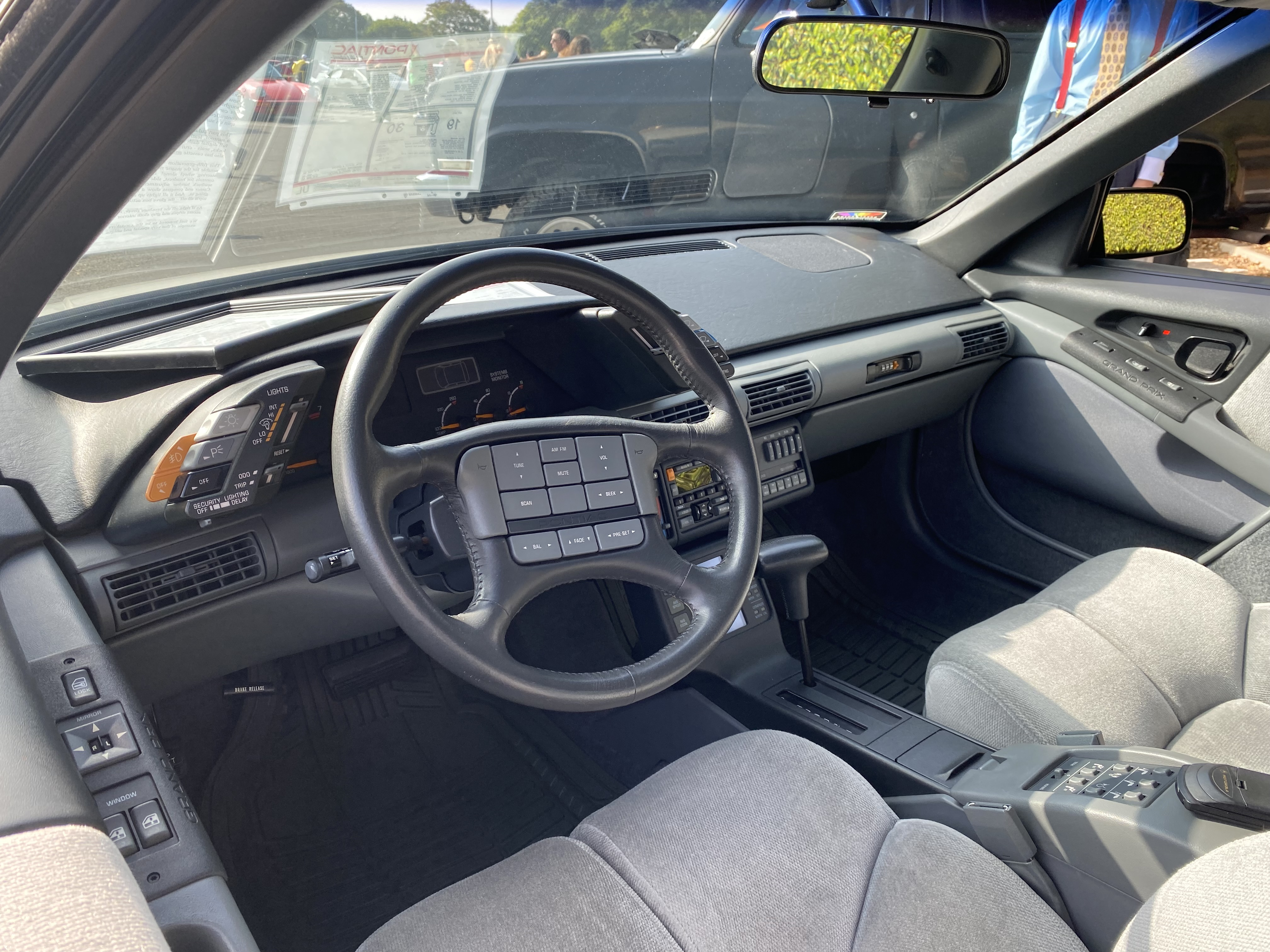
1989 Pontiac Grand Prix SE Steering Wheel

In the 1990s, a proliferation of new buttons appeared on automobile steering wheels. Remote or alternate adjustments could include vehicle audio, telephone, and voice control navigation. Scroll wheels or buttons are often used to set volume levels, page through menus, and change radio stations or audio tracks. These controls can use universal interfaces, wired or wireless.

== Other uses ==
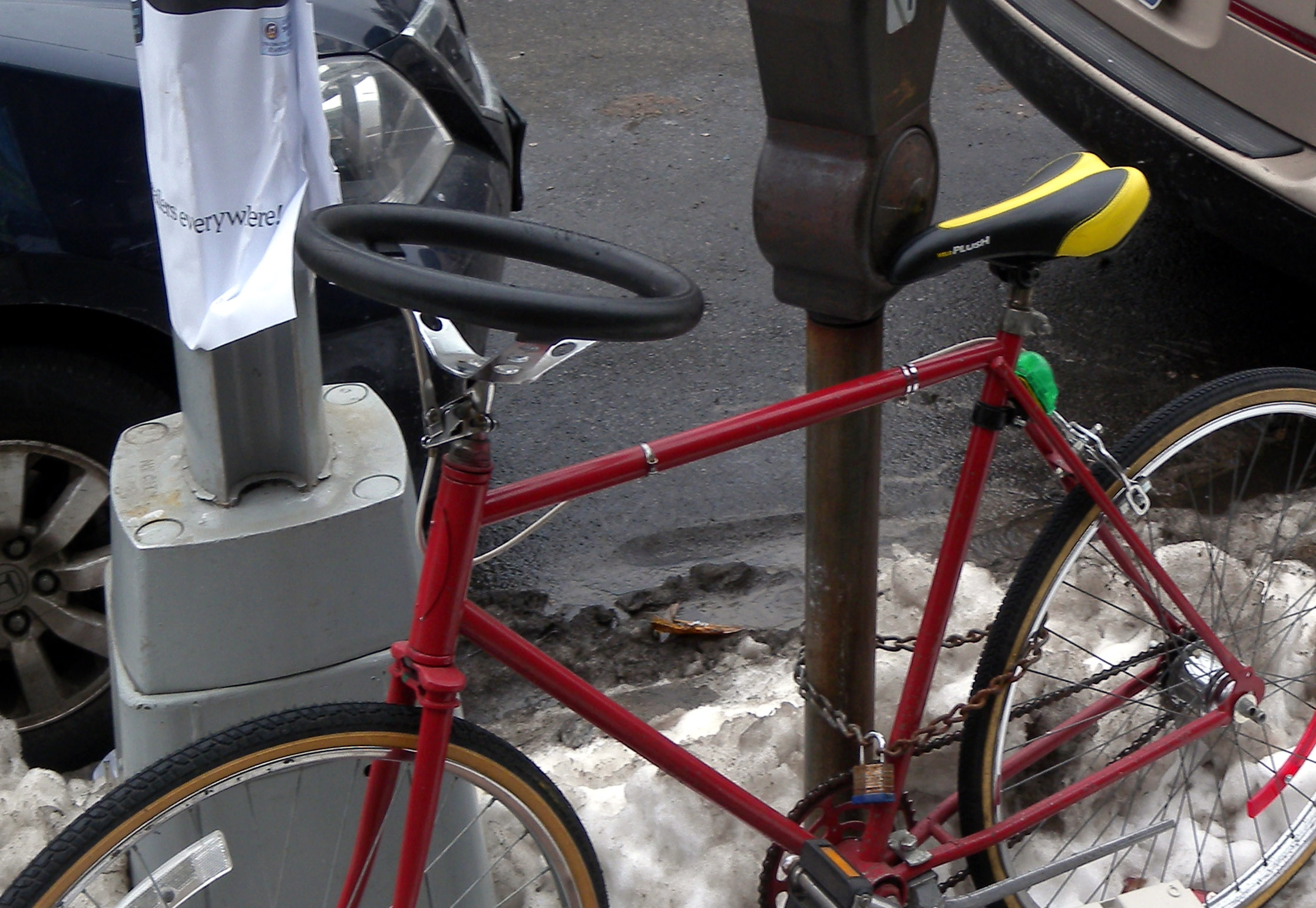
Bicycle steering wheel

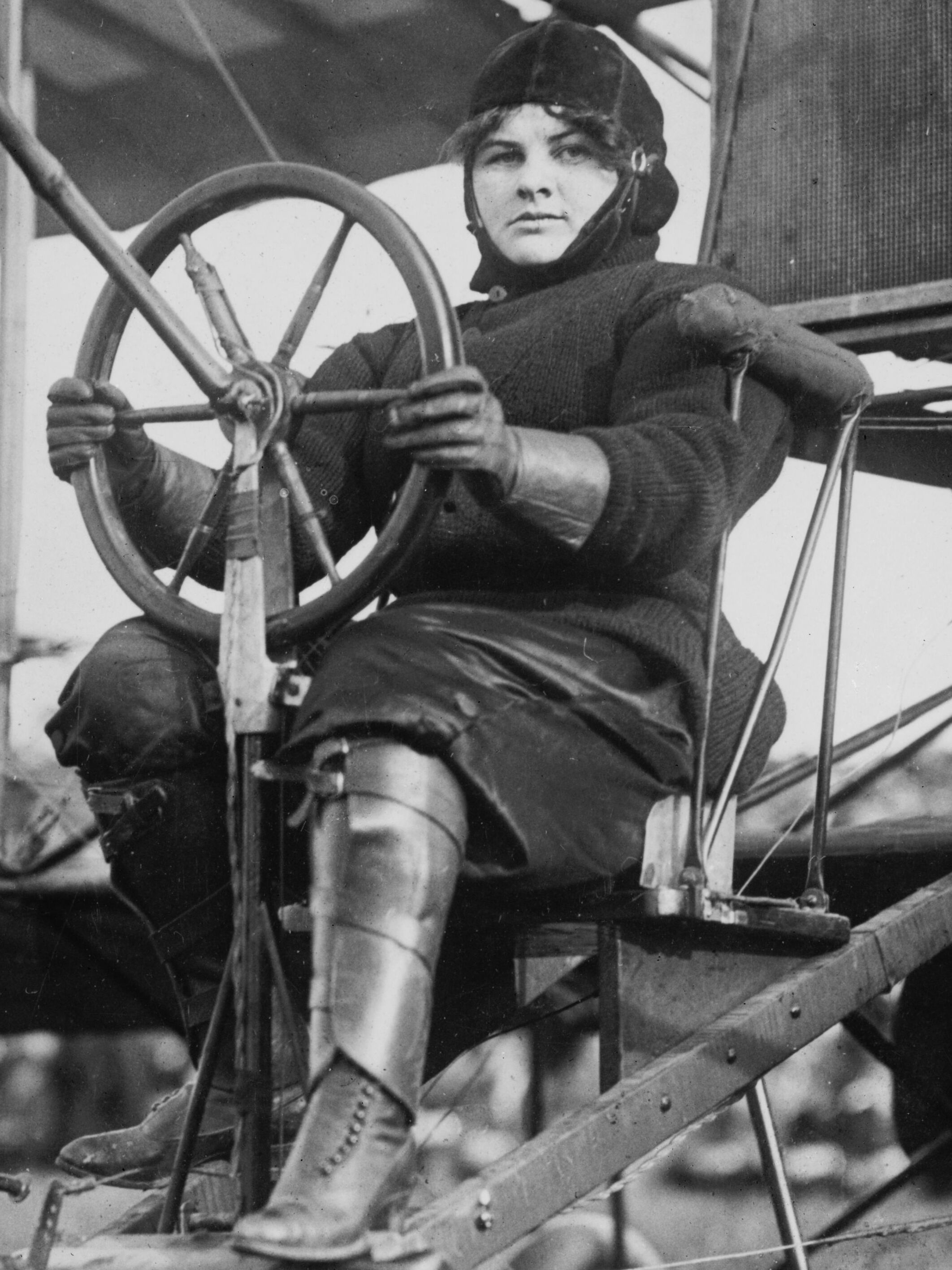
Biplane steering wheel

== Arcade steering wheels ==
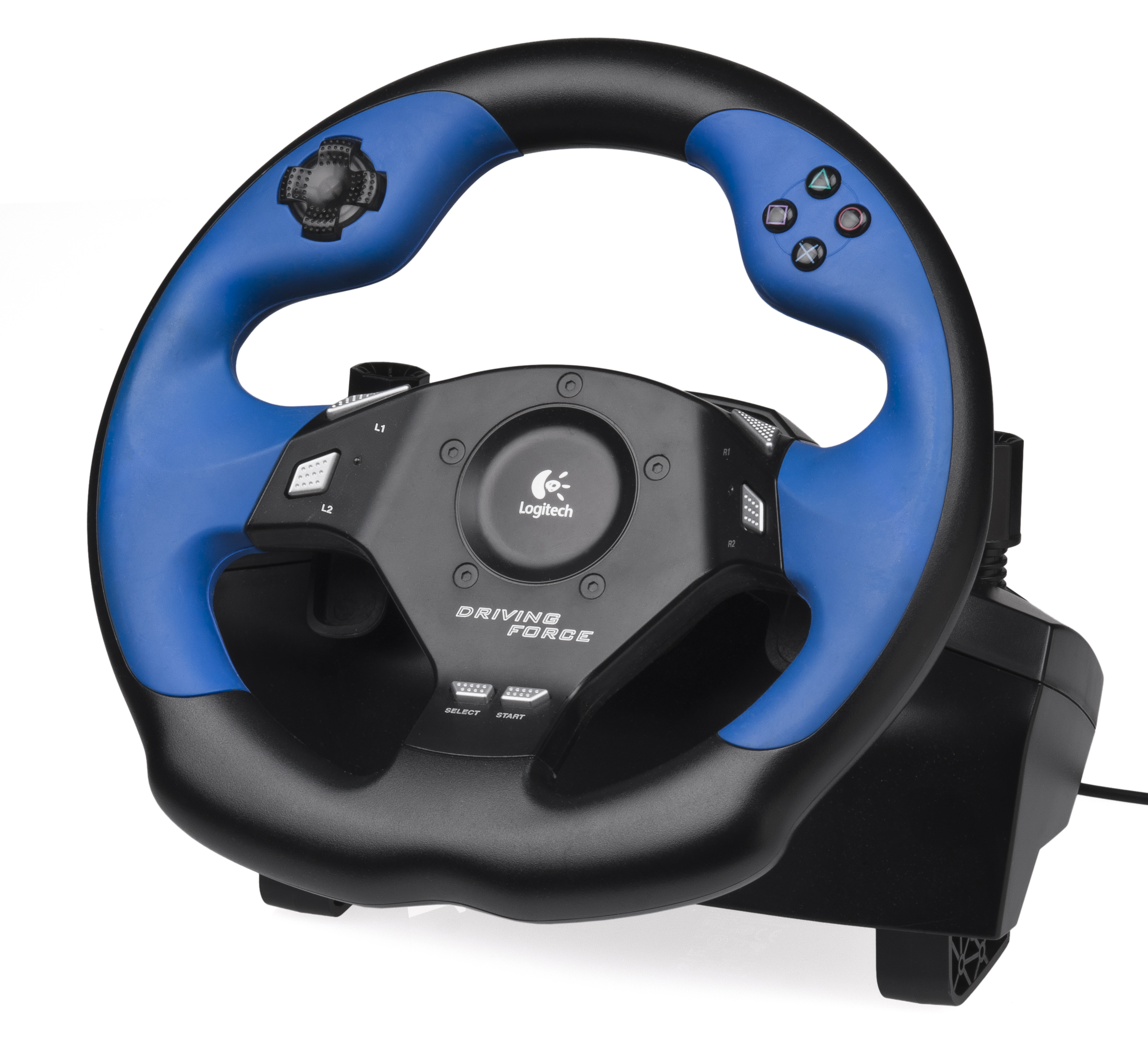
A video game steering wheel for the PlayStation 2 console

Game controllers are available for arcade cabinets, personal computers, and console games that are designed to look and feel like a steering wheel and intended for use in racing games. An early example is the Telstar Arcade, which featured a wheel in 1977 for use in the Road Race game that came packaged with it. Some modern video game steering wheels employ haptic technology to simulate the feedback a real driver feels from a steering wheel, as well as buttons to allow for more inputs.

== See also ==
- List of auto parts
- Remote control
