= Weld neck flange =

Flange

A weld neck flange (also known as a high-hub flange and tapered hub flange) is a type of flange. There are two designs. The regular type is used with pipes. The long type is unsuitable for pipes and is used in process plant. A weld neck flange consists of a circular fitting with a protruding rim around the circumference. Generally machined from a forging, these flanges are typically butt welded to a pipe. The rim has a series of drilled holes that permit the flange to be affixed to another flange with bolts.

Such flanges are suitable for use in hostile environments that have extremes of temperature, pressure or other sources of stress. The resilience of this type of flange is achieved by sharing the environmental stress with the pipe with which it is welded. This type of flange has been used successfully at pressures up to 5,000 psi.
