= Flange =

A flange is a protruded ridge, lip or rim, either external or internal, that serves:

- to increase strength, such as the flange of a steel beam such as an I-beam or T-beam
- for easy attachment or transfer of contact force with another object, such as the flange on the end of a pipe or steam cylinder, or the circular or oval flange for securing truck and trailer tail lights on the lens mount of a camera
- for stabilizing and guiding the movements of a machine or its parts, such as the inside flange of a rail car or tram wheel which keeps the wheels from running off the rails

Flanges are often attached using bolts in the pattern of a bolt circle.

== Plumbing or piping ==
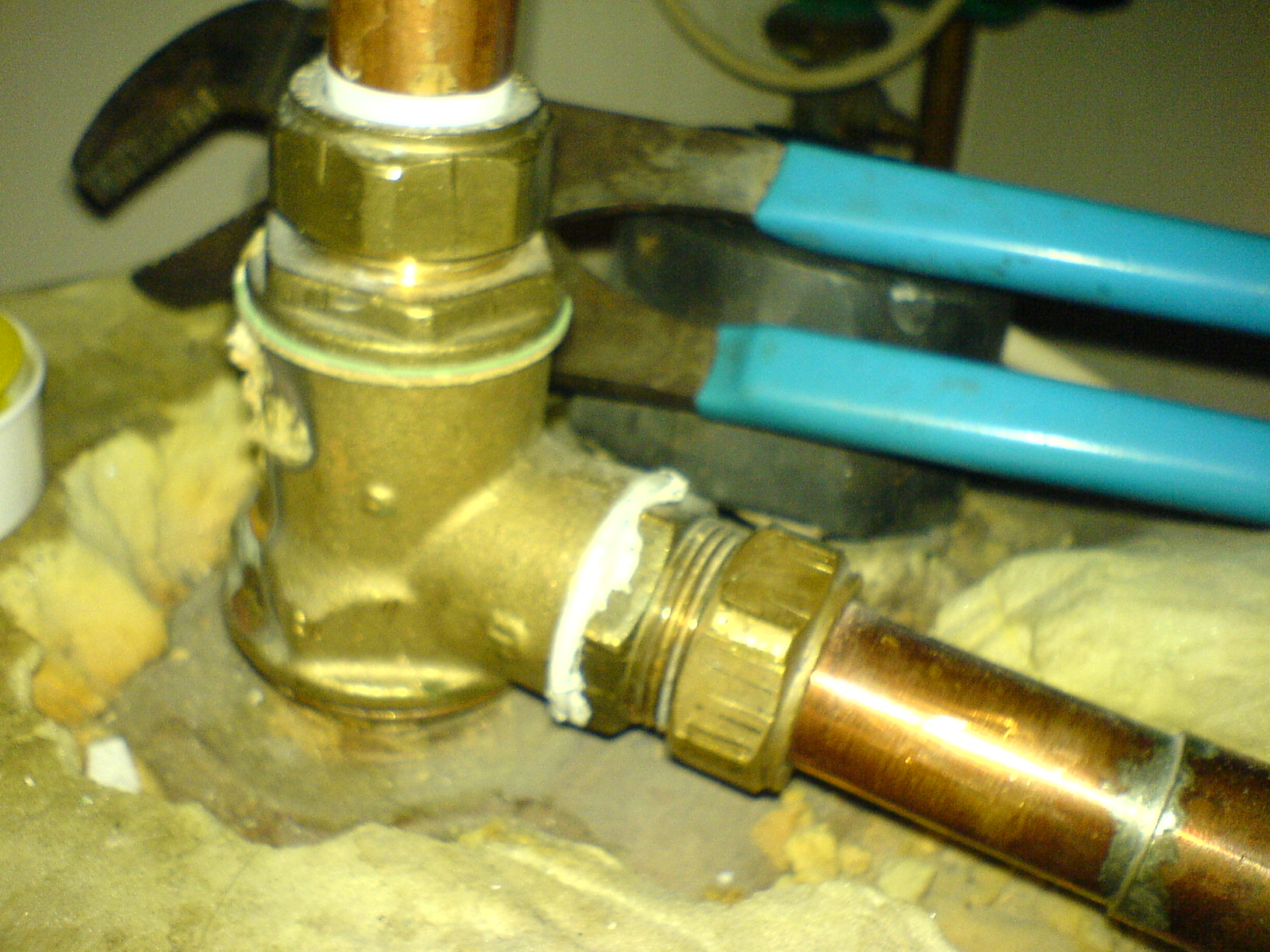
Surrey flange

A flange can also be a plate or ring to form a rim at the end of a pipe when fastened to the pipe (for example, a closet flange). A blind flange is a plate for covering or closing the end of a pipe. A flange joint is a connection of pipes, where the connecting pieces have flanges by which the parts are bolted together.

Although the word 'flange' generally refers to the actual raised rim or lip of a fitting, many flanged plumbing fittings are themselves known as flanges.

Common flanges used in plumbing are the Surrey flange or Danzey flange, York flange, Sussex flange and Essex flange. Surrey and York flanges fit to the top of the hot water tank allowing all the water to be taken without disturbance to the tank. They are often used to ensure an even flow of water to showers. An Essex flange requires a hole to be drilled in the side of the tank.

There is also a Warix flange which is the same as a York flange but the shower output is on the top of the flange and the vent on the side. The York and Warix flange have female adapters so that they fit onto a male tank, whereas the Surrey flange connects to a female tank.

A closet flange provides the mount for a toilet.

== Pipe flanges ==
Piping components can be bolted together between flanges. Flanges are used to connect pipes with each other, to valves, to fittings, and to specialty items such as strainers and pressure vessels. A cover plate can be connected to create a "blind flange". Flanges are joined by bolting, and sealing is often completed with the use of gaskets or other methods. Mechanical means to mitigate effects of leaks, like spray guards or specific spray flanges, may be included. Industries where flammable, volatile, toxic or corrosive substances are being processed have greater need of special protection at flanged connections. Flange guards can provide that added level of protection to ensure safety.

There are many different flange standards to be found worldwide. To allow easy functionality and interchangeability, these are designed to have standardised dimensions. Common world standards include ASA/ASME (USA), PN/DIN (European), BS10 (British/Australian), and JIS/KS (Japanese/Korean). In the USA, the standard is ASME B16.5 (ANSI stopped publishing B16.5 in 1996). ASME B16.5 covers flanges up to 24 inches size and up to pressure rating of Class 2500. Flanges larger than 24 inches are covered in ASME B16.47.

In most cases, standards are interchangeable, as most local standards have been aligned to ISO standards; however, some local standards still differ. For example, an ASME flange will not mate against an ISO flange. Further, many of the flanges in each standard are divided into "pressure classes", allowing flanges to be capable of taking different pressure ratings. Again these are not generally interchangeable (e.g. an ASME 150 will not mate with an ASME 300).

These pressure classes also have differing pressure and temperature ratings for different materials. Unique pressure classes for piping can also be developed for a process plant or power generating station; these may be specific to the corporation, engineering procurement and construction (EPC) contractor, or the process plant owner. The ASME pressure classes for flat-face flanges are Class 125 and Class 250. The classes for ring-joint, tongue and groove, and raised-face flanges are Class 150, Class 300, Class 400 (unusual), Class 600, Class 900, Class 1500, and Class 2500.

The flange faces are also made to standardized dimensions and are typically "flat face", "raised face", "tongue and groove", or "ring joint" styles, although other obscure styles are possible.

Flange designs are available as "weld neck", "slip-on", "lap joint", "socket weld", "threaded", and also "blind". Among these, weld neck flanges are preferred for high-pressure and high-temperature applications due to their superior structural integrity. Slip-on flanges are widely used in low-pressure systems for their ease of installation and cost-effectiveness. Blind flanges are used to seal the end of a piping system, while threaded and socket weld flanges are typically used in smaller pipe sizes.

=== ASME standards (U.S.) ===
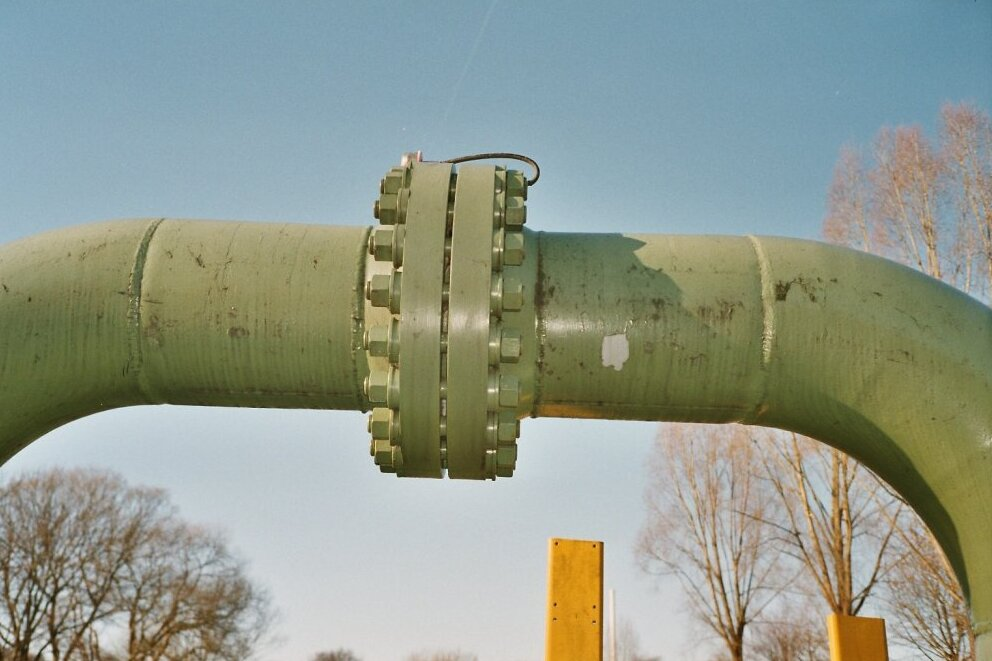
Two ASME type flanges, bolted together on a gas pipeline

Pipe flanges that are made to standards called out by ASME B16.5 or ASME B16.47, and MSS SP-44. They are typically made from forged materials and have machined surfaces. ASME B16.5 refers to nominal pipe sizes (NPS) from 1/2" to 24". B16.47 covers NPSs from 26" to 60". Each specification further delineates flanges into pressure classes: 150, 300, 400, 600, 900, 1500 and 2500 for B16.5, and B16.47 delineates its flanges into pressure classes 75, 150, 300, 400, 600, 900. However these classes do not correspond to maximum pressures in psi. Instead, the maximum pressure depends on the material of the flange and the temperature. For example, the maximum pressure for a Class 150 flange is 285 psi, and for a Class 300 flange it is 740 psi (both are for ASTM a105 carbon steel and temperatures below 100 °F).

The gasket type and bolt type are generally specified by the standard(s); however, sometimes the standards refer to the ASME Boiler and Pressure Vessel Code (B&PVC) for details (see ASME Code Section VIII Division 1 – Appendix 2). These flanges are recognized by ASME Pipe Codes such as ASME B31.1 Power Piping, and ASME B31.3 Process Piping.

Materials for flanges are usually under ASME designation: SA-105 (Specification for Carbon Steel Forgings for Piping Applications), SA-266 (Specification for Carbon Steel Forgings for Pressure Vessel Components), or SA-182 (Specification for Forged or Rolled Alloy-Steel Pipe Flanges, Forged Fittings, and Valves and Parts for High-Temperature Service). In addition, there are many "industry standard" flanges that in some circumstance may be used on ASME work.

The product range includes SORF, SOFF, BLRF, BLFF, WNRF (XS, XXS, STD and Schedule 20, 40, 80), WNFF (XS, XXS, STD and Schedule 20, 40, 80), SWRF (XS and STD), SWFF (XS and STD), Threaded RF, Threaded FF and LJ, with sizes from 1/2" to 16". The bolting material used for flange connection is stud bolts mated with two nut (washer when required). In petrochemical industries, ASTM A193 B7 STUD and ASTM A193 B16 stud bolts are used as these have high tensile strength.

=== European dimensions (EN / DIN) Hygienic Flange STC DIN11853-2 ===
Most countries in Europe mainly install flanges according to standard DIN EN 1092-1 (forged stainless or steel flanges). Similar to the ASME flange standard, the EN 1092-1 standard has the basic flange forms, such as weld neck flange, blind flange, lapped flange, threaded flange (thread ISO7-1 instead of NPT), weld on collar, pressed collars, and adapter flange such as flange coupling GD press fittings. The different forms of flanges within the EN 1092-1 (European Norm/Euronorm) is indicated within the flange name through the type.

Design	According to EN type	According to DIN
Weld-neck flange	Type 11	DIN 2627 – DIN 2638
Blind flange	Type 05	DIN 2527
Threaded flange	Type 12	DIN 2558, DIN 2565 – DIN 2569
Flat flange	Type 01	DIN 2573, DIN 2576
Lapped flange	Type 02 and Type 04	DIN 2641, DIN 2642, DIN 2655, DIN 2656

Similar to ASME flanges, EN1092-1 steel and stainless flanges, have several different versions of raised or none raised faces. According to the European form the seals are indicated by different form:

Form: types of contact faces	DIN EN 1092-1
Without raised face	Form A
Raised face (Rz = 160 mechanical turned)	Form B1
Raised race (Rz = 40 mechanical turned)	Form B1
Raised face (Rz = 16 mechanical turned)	Form B2
Tongue according to DIN2512	Form C
Groove according to DIN 2512	Form D
Male according to DIN 2513	Form E
Female according to DIN 2513	Form F
Female according to DIN 2514	Form G
Male according to DIN 2514	Form H

Furthermore, for sanitary applications such as in the food and beverage and pharmaceutical industries, sanitary flanges according to DIN 11853-2 STC are utilized. The primary distinction between sanitary flanges according to DIN 11853-2 and DIN/EN flanges lies in the restricted dead-room and the interior polishing according to hygienic levels of H1 to H4. Usually the flange traders that hold the Standard DIN EN 1092-1 such as Hage Fittings, do not hold Sanitary flanges as the storage requirements are different. Sanitary flanges are more delicate and need to stay clean. Usually the O-Rings, according to DIn 11853, are made out of FPM or EPDM.

=== Other countries ===
Flanges in the rest of the world are manufactured according to the ISO standards for materials, pressure ratings, etc. to which local standards including DIN, BS, and others, have been aligned.

== Compact flanges ==
As the size of a compact flange increases it becomes relatively increasingly heavy and complex resulting in high procurement, installation and maintenance costs. Large flange diameters in particular are difficult to work with, and inevitably require more space and have a more challenging handling and installation procedure, particularly on remote installations such as oil rigs.

The design of the flange face includes two independent seals. The first seal is created by application of seal seating stress at the flange heel, but it is not straight forward to ensure the function of this seal.

Theoretically, the heel contact will be maintained for pressure values up to 1.8 times the flange rating at room temperature.

Theoretically, the flange also remains in contact along its outer circumference at the flange faces for all allowable load levels that it is designed for.

The main seal is the IX seal ring. The seal ring force is provided by the elastic stored energy in the stressed seal ring. Any heel leakage will give internal pressure acting on the seal ring inside intensifying the sealing action. This however requires the IX ring to be retained in the theoretical location in the ring groove which is difficult to ensure and verify during installation.

The design aims at preventing exposure to oxygen and other corrosive agents. Thus, this prevents corrosion of the flange faces, the stressed length of the bolts and the seal ring. This however depends on the outer dust rim to remain in satisfactory contact and that the inside fluid is not corrosive in case of leaking into the bolt circle void.

=== Applications of compact flanges ===
The initial cost of the theoretical higher performance compact flange is inevitably higher than a regular flange due to the closer tolerances and significantly more sophisticated design and installation requirements. By way of example, compact flanges are often used across the following applications: subsea oil and gas or riser, cold work and cryogenics, gas injection, high temperature, and nuclear applications.

== Train wheels ==
Most trains and trams stay on their tracks primarily due to the conical geometry of their wheels. They also have a flange on one side to keep the wheels, and hence the train, running on the rails when the limits of the geometry-based alignment are reached, either due to some emergency or defect, or simply because the curve radius is so small that self-steering normally provided by the coned wheel tread is no longer effective.

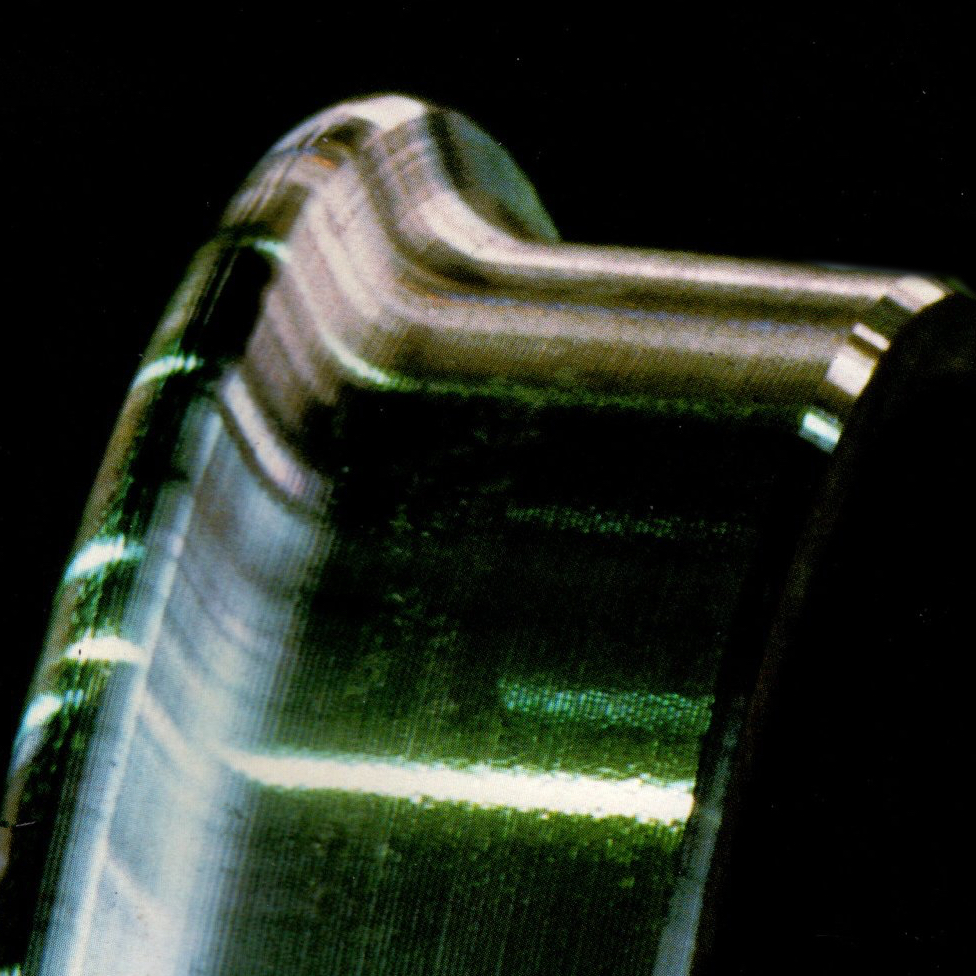
- Tread and flange of a railway wheel

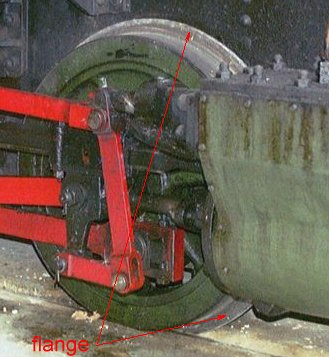
Flanged wheel on a small steam locomotive

== Vacuum flanges ==
A vacuum flange is a flange at the end of a tube used to connect vacuum chambers, tubing and vacuum pumps to each other.

== Microwave ==
Form factor of PDR and CBR flanges.

In microwave telecommunications, a flange is a type of cable joint that allows different types of waveguide to connect.

Several different microwave RF flange types exist, such as CAR, CBR, OPC, PAR, PBJ, PBR, PDR, UAR, UBR, UDR, icp and UPX.

== Ski boots ==
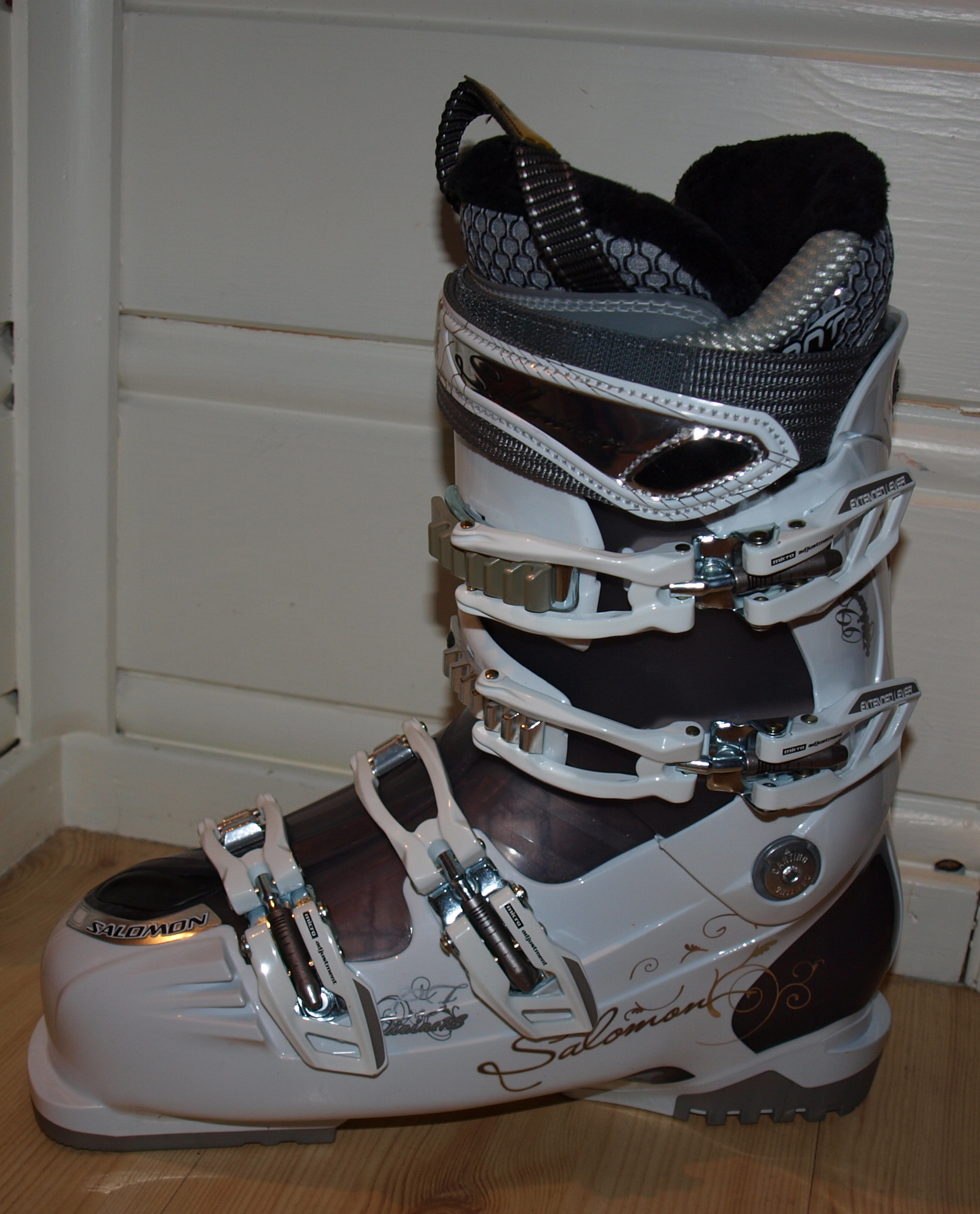
The extensions at the toe and heel of this ski boot produce flanges used to clip into the ski bindings.

Ski boots use flanges at the toe or heel to connect to the binding of the ski. The size and shape for flanges on alpine skiing boots is standardized in ISO 5355. Traditional telemark and cross country boots use the 75 mm Nordic Norm, but the toe flange is informally known as the "duckbill". New cross country bindings eliminate the flange entirely and use a steel bar embedded within the sole instead.

== See also ==
- Casing head
- Closet flange
- Victaulic
- Swivel
