= Direct-drive sim racing wheel =

Simulator steering wheel

A direct-drive simulator steering wheelbase (sometimes abbreviated "DD wheel") is a simulator steering wheel with a direct-drive mechanism between the drive and output, i.e. without gearing (as opposed to simulator steering wheels with reduction gearing via gears or belts), and is used similarly as with other simulator steering wheels for providing torque feedback (often called ""force" feedback", or FFB) so that the driver, through movement in the steering wheel, gets an interface for sensing what is happening to the car in the simulator. It is an example of human–computer interaction in driving simulators, racing simulators, and racing video games, and is an example of haptic technology.

Direct-drive steering wheels typically differ from geared or belted sim racing wheels by being stronger (having more torque), and being able to more accurately reproduce details from the simulator. They are typically constructed using a 3-phase brushless AC servomotor (on more expensive models), or sometimes a hybrid stepper-servomotor, or only a stepper motor (on very affordable models).

In a direct drive simracing steering wheel system, the wheelbase and the wheel rim are typically separate, so that is possible to switch between rims according to the use case, for instance formula wheelrims, GT wheelrims, oval racing or truck wheel rims. The base and the rim are typically connected through a quick release system.

== History ==
Direct-drive mechanisms for use in industrial arms began to be possible in the 1980s, with the use of rare-earth magnets, of which today the most commonly used are neodymium magnets.

Before the 1980s, servo motors were not powerful enough (did not have enough torque) to be used directly, and therefore reduction gears or mechanical belts were added to the motor to leverage and multiply its power. Higher-power motors were not feasible due to the expensive rare-earth materials needed to build them. This problem was surpassed in the 1980s, with the development of less-expensive high-power magnets.

In 2013, direct-drive sim steering wheels were introduced in large scale to the consumer mass market as a more advanced alternative to gear- and belt-driven steering wheels. The first commercially broadly available direct-drive wheel base was released in 2013 by the UK-based Leo Bodnar Electronics, after having been retailing to racing teams and professional centers since 2008. It was followed in 2015 by the US-based SimXperience AccuForce V1, and by the first do-it-yourself open-source hardware OpenSimwheel or "OSW" kits for users with good technical knowledge.

In 2015, a preliminary comparison of gear-driven and direct-drive wheels in the 0–30 Hz frequency range, for a study on hard real-time multibody simulation and high-fidelity steering wheel force feedback, concluded that direct-drive wheels are preferable.

Simucube was one of the manufacturers who previously provided Open Sim Wheel kits, and is a brand name owned by the Finnish manufacturer Granite Devices, which also supplies driver electronics for controlling servomotors and stepper motors, both for sim racing and industrial use. Granite Devices started as a hobby project by the Finn Kontkanen Tero when he was building a CNC milling machine, and realised that there was many alternating current servomotors of high quality on the market, but that driver electronics for controlling such motors was expensive or hard to come by. He investigated the operation of AC servos, and realized that it was possible to make usable control electronics with a handful of the latest electronic components and some real-time algorithms. The development of the controller then took around a year. The electronics are based on an IONI motherboard and STM32F4, and a proprietary firmware called MMos. An open source version of this software has been planned for release, but has not yet been released as of 2022.

== Performance metrics ==
Issues, quality, and performance indicators of direct-drive wheels, and of sim racing wheels in general, include detail and fidelity of force feedback, smooth torque transmission, nearly-zero backlash, rotary encoder resolution, clipping, dynamic range, torque ripple, cogging torque, drivers and digital signal processing with control electronics, signal filtering, backdrive friction, low inertia, damping, fast response, precise positioning, electromagnetic interference, and latency.

== Construction ==
=== Motors ===
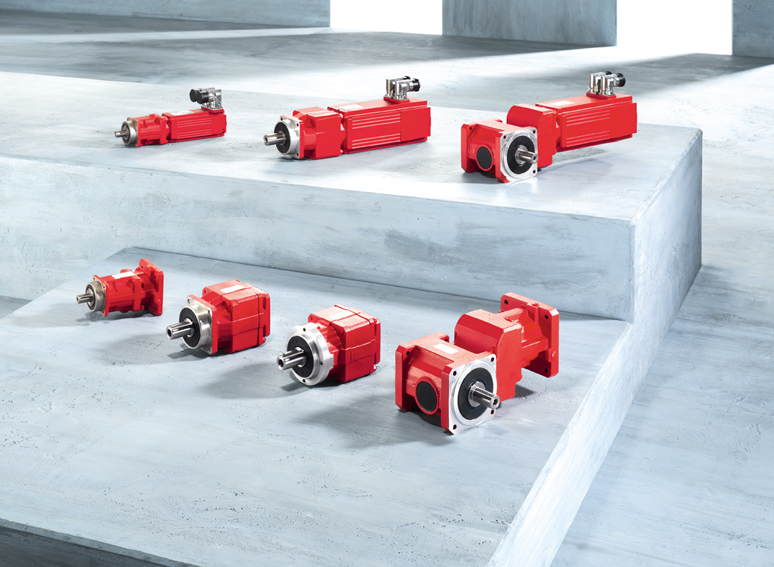
Industrial servomotors and gearboxes, with standardised flange mountings for interchangeability.

The Leo Bodnar, OSW kits, Sim-pli.city and VRS systems are based on industrial servo motors (typically MiGE, Lenze, or Kollmorgen motors), while SimXperience's AccuForce, Frex, Simucube (which initially used a MiGE motor), Fanatec, and Simagic use custom-made motors. The types of motors used vary between high-end 3-phase brushless servomotors and lower budget hybrid stepper-servo motors. In-runner servo motors are typically smoother and more expensive than stepper or outrunner motors. Outrunner motors typically can produce more torque than inrunner motors, but need more cooling at higher torque levels.

=== Control electronics ===
Other than the motor, other parts of a complete direct-drive wheelbase include a rotary encoder (the position sensor), a controller board (that translate the FFB data from the game into steering wheel forces), and a motor driver board (servo drive), which fits into a slot of the controller board, and that controls the position, velocity and torque output of the motor. Examples of encoders are the Biss-C and the SinCos encoders, an example of a controller board is the Simucube board, and some examples of motor driver boards are the IONI and the Argon ones.

The motor encoder reads the position and/or motion (torque and rotation) of the shaft. The resolution of the encoder is typically measured in PPR (pulses per revolution), but sometimes CPR (counts, or steps, per revolution) is used instead, where 1 pulse equals 4 counts. The main advantage of very high resolution encoders is the ability to implement more advanced firmware or software FFB filters to the force feedback signal; for instance, encoders with a 21-bit resolution or more (2M steps or cpr), like the SinCos encoder, allow the servo-motor electronics to handle the filters more smoothly, and also allow to have more nuances in the FFB signal.

One of the main purposes of FFB filters is to optimize the FFB signal for a given wheelbase and rim device. The most basic FFB filters include the reconstruction filter, damper, friction and inertia. The reconstruction filter is included even in non-directdrive wheelbases, and has the effect of interpolating and smoothing the FFB signal from the game, to reduce the noise and artifacts from the FFB signal caused by the low update rate of a racing game. The wheel rim weight and size also have a significant effect on the perceived FFB signal, with lighter and smaller wheels being able to move faster and deliver more details.

More advanced FFB filters include static force reduction and slew rate reduction filter. The static force reduction filter was introduced to address a problem that emerged with high-torque DD wheelbase, due to their force output making too difficult to even turn the wheel with some cars in high-speed corners. The static force reduction filter introduced with Simucube 2 wheelbase allowed to address this issue while keeping a fully linear signal. A side-effect of this filter however is that while turning the wheel one feels a weakening of the FFB signal, which some drivers might dislike. Similarly, the slew rate reduction filter reduces or dampens sudden acceleration spikes in FFB torque, due for example to hitting kerbs or bumps. Therefore, the static force reduction and slew rate reduction filters make feasible to drive with higher maximum torque settings, which can enhance micro-details in the FFB signal.

=== Torque ===
The torque says something about how "powerful" the engine is, and can be specified in two ways:

- Continuous torque, the greatest load of which the motor still can perform continuous movement at a continuous speed, and thus performing continuous work
- Stall torque, the load which will cause the motor to stop so that it can no longer move, and thus produces a holding torque, but not performing any work

The latter always gives a higher number in newton-meters, and is therefore the number that usually is communicated the most by manufacturers to consumers, but is actually a less useful specification since the steering wheel in theory does not perform any work when rotation has stopped. One must therefore be aware of the type of torque specification given when comparing two motors. The relationship between the continuous torque and stall torque can vary between motors, and can say something about the motor characteristics (responsiveness versus strength).

For comparison, usually around 7-10 Nm is experienced in a street car, and on steering wheels with very high torque (e.g. 20 Nm) it may therefore be appropriate to adjust the torque down in the software. However, the stronger motors will often have a faster slew rate (the time an amplifier takes to respond to a signal) which gives better steering response and more realism.

=== Steering wheel mount ===
Similar to many real-world racing cars, sim-racing steering wheels usually come with a bolt circle of 6×70 mm, which means the wheel is mounted to the base via 6 evenly spaced out screws along a 70 mm circle on the steering wheel. Other bolt circles are sometimes used.

Some steering wheels attach to the base via quick release, as is commonly seen on many real-world racing cars, and these come in many varieties: Proprietary quick releases (e.g. Fanatec QR1 or Simucube SQR, the latter which has a wedge-shaped dovetail), or standardized quick releases such as the D1 spec (used by many manufacturers, including SimXperience, Simagic, Moza, IMMSource). D1 spec couplers are built to the same pattern as the NRG quick coupler approved for use in real-world racing cars per SFI Spec 42.1. Formerly, another common aftermarket quick release has been the Q1R type (not to be confused with the Fanatec QR1). Some quick releases have (often proprietary) integrated contact pins for transferring power and data to buttons and displays on the wheel, but these usually do not work across manufacturers. Others instead use wireless transmission via Bluetooth and inductive (magnetic) power transfer via the quick release. If using a steering wheel and base from two different manufacturers, it is usually possible to connect the steering wheel electronics to the base via a separate USB cable, for example connecting between USB-C, Micro, Mini, or Type B interfaces on the base and wheel.

=== Base mount ===
On bases with a high torque, the most robust mounting is usually achieved using an industry-standard front-mounted flange mount, and this is often preferred among sim racers, as such base mounts usually are less inclined to bend during heavy steering movements. This typically gives a shorter lever and therefore more sturdy mounting due to less torque on the mounting interface. A de facto industry standard among sim wheels, which again stems from a widely used mechanical industry standard, is a front mount with a bolt circle measuring 4×130 mm diameter and metric M8 screws, which means that four screws are evenly placed along a circle measuring 130 mm in diameter. This roughly corresponds to a square of 91.9 mm × 91.9 mm, which is often quoted as a square pattern with 92 mm long sides.

There are also a number of other proprietary patterns for mounting the base to a sim racing cockpit or table. Some of these instead have mounting on the sides or underside of the base.

== List of direct-drive bases ==
=== Main specifications ===
Sorted chronologically by time of introduction:

| Model | Introduced | Peak torque (stall torque) | Slew rate (Nm/ms) | Encoder Resolution | Motor |
|---|---|---|---|---|---|
| LeoBodnar Sim Steering | 2013 | 16 Nm | | 12-bit (40k cpr / 10k ppr) EJ encoder | Kollmorgen AKM52G-ANCNEJ00, brushless servomotor, ⌀ 24.2 mm shaft |
| LeoBodnar Sim Steering 2 (standard 52 version) | 2015 | 16 Nm | | 24-bit (16.7M cpr) C resolver ("SFD, Smart Feedback Device") | Kollmorgen AKM52G-ANCNC-00, brushless servomotor, ⌀ 24.2 mm shaft |
| LeoBodnar Sim Steering 2 (53 version) | 2015 | 20.5 | | 24-bit (16.7M cpr) 16.7M cpr C resolver ("SFD, Smart Feedback Device") | Kollmorgen AKM53G, brushless servomotor, ⌀ 24.2 mm shaft |
| "OSW" DIY kit, Lenze | 2015 | 29 Nm | | 16k ppr | Lenze MCS12H15L |
| "OSW" DIY kit, M15 | 2015 | 30 Nm | | 10k ppr | MiGE 130ST-M15015 (large MiGE), ⌀ 22 mm shaft |
| "OSW" DIY kit, M10 | 2015 | 20 Nm | | 10k ppr | MiGE 130ST-M10010 ("small MiGE"), ⌀ 22 mm shaft |
| "OSW" DIY kit, Hobbystar | 2015 | 20 Nm | | 10k ppr | MiGE 130ST-M10010 ("small MiGE"), ⌀ 22 mm shaft |
| Reimer Motorsports OpenSimwheel Premium | 2015 | 29 Nm | | 16k cpr | Lenze MCS12H15L |
| Reimer Motorsports OpenSimwheel Premium AKM52 | 2015 | 24 Nm | | 32k cpr | Kollmorgen AKM52 3-phase AC servo, ⌀ 24.2 mm shaft |
| SimXperience AccuForce V1 | 2015 | 16 Nm | | 16k PPR encoder | Stepper motor, ⌀ 14 mm shaft |
| Frex SimWheel DD | 2016 | 16 Nm | | | MiGE servomotor |
| Sim-pli.city SW20 | 2017 | 20 Nm | | 10k ppr encoder | MiGE 130ST-M10010 (small MiGE), inrunner, ⌀ 22 mm shaft |
| SimXperience AccuForce V2 | 2017 | 15.6 Nm | | 16k resolution | Hybrid stepper/servomotor, ⌀ 14 mm shaft |
| Simucube-based pre-assembled OSW kit (large MiGE) | (before 2018) | 30 Nm | | 5k or 10k ppr encoder | MiGE 130ST-M15015, inrunner, ⌀ 22 mm shaft |
| Simucube-based pre-assembled OSW kit (small MiGE) | (before 2018) | 20 Nm | | 5k or 10k ppr encoder | MiGE 130ST-M10010, inrunner, ⌀ 22 mm shaft |
| Simucube-based pre-assembled OSW kit Biss-C (2018 version), M15 | 2018 | 30 Nm | | 22-bit (4.2M cpr) in the 2018 version | MiGE 130ST-M15015, inrunner, ⌀ 22 mm shaft |
| Simucube-based pre-assembled OSW kit Biss-C (2018 version), M10 | 2018 | 20 Nm | | 22-bit (4.2M cpr) in the 2018 version | MiGE 130ST-M10010 or MiGE 130ST-M15015, inrunner, ⌀ 22 mm shaft |
| simracingbay "OSW" DIY kit | 2018 | 20 Nm | | 22-bit (4.2M cpr) (originally 2.1M cpr) | MiGE 130ST-M10010, ⌀ 22 mm shaft |
| Augury Simulations SimuCube OSW Kit | 2018 | 18 Nm | | | MiGE servomotor, ⌀ 22 mm shaft |
| Sim-pli.city SW7C | 2018 | 7.1 Nm | | | Mige 80ST Series Motor, inrunner, ⌀ 21.5 mm shaft |
| Sim-pli.city SW20 V3 | 2019 | 20 Nm | | 23-bit (8M cpr) | MiGE 130ST-M10010, inrunner, ⌀ 22 mm shaft |
| Simucube 2 Sport | 2019-04-03 | 17 Nm | 4.8 | 22-bit absolute (4.2M cpr) | ultra low torque ripple Brushless Servomotor, inrunner |
| Simucube 2 Pro | 2019-04-03 | 25 Nm | 8.0 | 22-bit absolute (4.2M cpr) | ultra low torque ripple Brushless Servomotor, inrunner |
| Simucube 2 Ultimate | 2019-04-03 | 32 Nm | 9.5 | 24-bit absolute 24-bit, 16M cpr | ultra low torque ripple Brushless Servomotor, inrunner |
| Fanatec Podium DD2 | 2019 | 25 Nm | | 16-bit (65k cpr) (was 8-bit initially) | Custom-made outrunner servomotor, hollow ⌀ 1 1/4 in (32 mm) shaft with USB-C for data and power |
| Fanatec Podium DD1 | 2019 | 20 Nm | | 16-bit (65k cpr) (was 8-bit initially) | Custom-made outrunner (Note: Fanatec argues that outrunner motors "increase the moment arm of the motor" and "give more space for higher quality magnets") servomotor, hollow ⌀ 1 1/4 in (32 mm) shaft with USB-C for data and power |
| Fanatec Clubsport DD | 2023 | | | | |
| Fanatec Clubsport DD+ | 2023 | | | | |
| Simagic Dynamic M10 | 2020-01 | 10 Nm | | | Servo-Stepper Motor |
| Sim-pli.city SW8C+ | 2020 | 8 Nm | | 23-bit (8M cpr) | MiGE 110ST-M06030, inrunner |
| VRS DirectForce Pro | 2020 | 20 Nm | | 22-bit (4M cpr), absolute Biss encoder | MiGE 130ST-M10010, inrunner, ⌀ 22 mm shaft |
| Simagic Alpha | 2020-12-05 | 15 Nm | | 18-bit based on hall sensor | 5-pole, 3-phase servomotor |
| Simagic Alpha-U (or Alpha Ultimate) | 2021-10-13 | 23 Nm | | 18-bit | 5-pole servomotor |
| CAMMUS DDWB 2021 | 2021-11 | 15 | | | servomotor |
| Fanatec CSL DD (with optional 180 W power supply) | 2021-04-21 | 8 Nm | | | Brushless inrunner servomotor, hollow ⌀ 1 1/4 in (32 mm) shaft with USB-C for data and power |
| Fanatec CSL DD (with base 90 W power supply) | 2021-04-21 | 5 Nm | | | Brushless inrunner servomotor, hollow ⌀ 1 1/4 in (32 mm) shaft with USB-C for data and power |
| Simagic Alpha Mini | 2021-06-27 | 13 Nm | | 256k ppr, 40Khz response rate | 3-phase servomotor optimized for sim racing use, outrunner |
| Moza R21 | 2021-06-23 | 21 Nm | | 18-bits (256k ppr) | Servomotor, slanted-pole design |
| Moza R16 | 2021-06-23 | 16 Nm | | 18-bits (256k ppr) | Servomotor, slanted-pole design |
| IMMSource (IMMS) ET5 | 2022-02-12 | 17 Nm (8 Nm in low torque mode) | | 18-bit encoder (262 144 steps) | Servomotor |
| IMMSource (IMMS) ET3 | 2022-02-12 | 10 Nm | | 18-bit encoder (262 144 steps) | Servomotor |
| Moza R12 | 2023-06-26 | 12 Nm | | 15-bit (32k ppr) | 16-pole Servomotor, slanted-pole design |
| Moza R9 | 2022-03-10 | 9 Nm | | 15-bit (32k ppr) | Outrunner servomotor |
| Moza R5 | 2022-08-30 | 5.5 Nm | | 15-bit (32k ppr) | Outrunner servomotor |
| Moza R3 for Xbox | 2024-07-04 | 3.9 Nm | | 15-bit encoder | Servomotor |
| Logitech G PRO Racing Wheel | 2022-09-21 | 11 Nm | | | Outrunner servomotor |
| Asetek Invicta | 2022-11-10 | 27 Nm | 9.4 | 22-bit absolute (4.2M steps) | MiGE servomotor |
| Asetek Forte | 2022-11-10 | 18 Nm | 6.7 | 22-bit (4.2M steps) | MiGE servomotor |
| Asetek La Prima | 2022-11-10 | 12 Nm | 4.0 | 22-bit (4.2M steps) | MiGE servomotor |
| Thrustmaster T818 | 2022-11-17 | 10 Nm | | | |
| CAMMUS C5 | 2023-06-09 | 7 Nm (holding 5 Nm) | | | Servomotor |
| CAMMUS C12 | 2024-02 | 12 Nm | | | Servomotor |
| VNM Direct Drive Xtreme | 2024-03 | 32 | | 23-bit (8M CPR), absolute | 5-pole servomotor |
| Thrustmaster T598 | 2024-10-19 | | | | Direct Axial Drive |
| VRS DFP15 | 2024-12 | 15 Nm | | 21-bit (2.1M steps), 10 kHz response rate | 5-Pole Servomotor |
| VNM Direct Drive Supreme | 2025-01-18 | 25 | | 23-bit (8M CPR), absolute | 5-pole servomotor |
| VNM Direct Drive Elite | 2025-01-18 | 18 | | 23-bit (8M CPR), absolute | 5-pole servomotor |
| VNM Direct Drive Premier | 2025-01-18 | 13 | | 23-bit (8M CPR), absolute | 5-pole servomotor |
| Simagic Alpha EVO Sport | 2025-04-28 | 9 | | 21-bit | |
| Simagic Alpha EVO | 2025-04-28 | 12 | | 21-bit | |
| Simagic Alpha EVO Pro | 2025-04-28 | 18 | | 21-bit | |
| Model | Introduced | Stall torque | Slew rate (Nm/ms) | Resolution | Motor |

=== Mount options and quick release ===
| Model | Introduced | Wheel bolt circle | Wheel quick release | Front base mount | Other base mounts | Other notes |
|---|---|---|---|---|---|---|
| LeoBodnar Sim Steering | 2013 | 6×70 mm | Not included | 4×140 mm bolt circle (M8) (□ 99 mm × 99 mm) | No | 3000 r/min |
| LeoBodnar Sim Steering 2 (standard 52 version) | 2015 | 6×70 mm | Not included | 4×140 mm bolt circle (M8) (□ 99 mm × 99 mm) | No | 3000 r/min, rated speed 5600 r/min, rotor inertia 4.58 kg-cm^{2} |
| LeoBodnar Sim Steering 2 (53 version) | 2015 | 6×70 mm | Not included | 4×140 mm bolt circle (M8) (□ 99 mm × 99 mm) | No | Rated speed 5100 r/min, rotor inertia 6.64 kg-cm^{2} |
| "OSW" DIY kit, Lenze | 2015 | 6×70 mm | Not included | 4×130 mm bolt circle (M8) (□ 92 mm × 92 mm) | No | 1500 r/min, rotor inertia: 7.3 kg cm^{2} |
| "OSW" DIY kit, M15 | 2015 | 6×70 mm | Not included | 4×130 mm bolt circle (M8) (□ 92 mm × 92 mm) | No | 1500 r/min, rotor inertia: 27.7 kg cm^{2} |
| "OSW" DIY kit, M10 | 2015 | 6×70 mm | Q1R (optional) | 4×130 mm bolt circle (M8) (□ 92 mm × 92 mm) | No | 1000 r/min, rotor inertia: 19.4 kg cm^{2} |
| "OSW" DIY kit, Hobbystar | 2015 | 6×70 mm | Q1R (optional) | 4×130 mm bolt circle (M8) (□ 92 mm × 92 mm) | No | 1000 r/min, rotor inertia: 19.4 kg cm^{2} |
| Reimer Motorsports OpenSimwheel Premium | 2015 | 6×70 mm | Not included | 4×130 mm bolt circle (M8) (□ 92 mm × 92 mm) | No | Granite Devices Argon electronics |
| Reimer Motorsports OpenSimwheel Premium AKM52 | 2015 | 6×70 mm | Not included | 4×130 mm bolt circle (M8) (□ 92 mm × 92 mm) | No | Granite Devices Argon electronics |
| SimXperience AccuForce V1 | 2015 | 6×70 mm | D1 spec | No | Under, rectangle: ▭ 79.4 mm × 135 mm (M5) | |
| Frex SimWheel DD | 2016 | 3×50.8 mm | Frex quick release | 4×130 mm bolt circle (M8) (□ 92 mm × 92 mm) | No | Mini USB |
| Sim-pli.city SW20 | 2017 | 6×70 mm | Not included | 4×130 mm bolt circle (M8) (□ 92 mm × 92 mm) | No | Controller: Granite Devices IONI Pro and SimuCUBE; 1000 r/min; rotor inertia 19.4 kg cm^{2} |
| SimXperience AccuForce V2 | 2017 | 6×70 mm | D1 spec | No | Under, rectangle: ▭ 39.4 mm × 135 mm | |
| Simucube-based pre-assembled OSW kit (large MiGE) | (before 2018) | 6×70 mm | Not included | 4×130 mm bolt circle (M8) (□ 92 mm × 92 mm) | No | IONI Pro HC (25A) controller, SimuCUBE motherboard; 1500 r/min (MiGE M15); 27.7 kg cm^{2} (M15) |
| Simucube-based pre-assembled OSW kit (small MiGE) | (before 2018) | 6×70 mm | Not included | 4×130 mm bolt circle (M8) (□ 92 mm × 92 mm) | No | IONI Pro (18A) controller, SimuCUBE motherboard; 1000 r/min (MiGE M10); rotor inertia: 19.4 kg cm^{2} (M10) |
| Simucube-based pre-assembled OSW kit Biss-C (2018 version), M15 | 2018 | 6×70 mm | Not included | 4×130 mm bolt circle (M8) (□ 92 mm × 92 mm) | No | Biss-C encoder; 1500 r/min, 27.7 kg cm^{2} rotor inertia |
| Simucube-based pre-assembled OSW kit Biss-C (2018 version), M10 | 2018 | 6×70 mm | Not included | 4×130 mm bolt circle (M8) (□ 92 mm × 92 mm) | No | Biss-C encoder; 1000 r/min, 19.4 kg cm^{2} rotor inertia |
| simracingbay "OSW" DIY kit | 2018 | 6×70 mm | Not included | 4×130 mm bolt circle (M8) (□ 92 mm × 92 mm) | No | SinCos encoder; driver board: Granite Devices IONI servo drive, IoniProHC 25A; 1000 r/min, 19.4 kg cm^{2} rotor inertia |
| Augury Simulations SimuCube OSW Kit | 2018 | 6×70 mm | Quick release directly on axle (option) | 4×130 mm bolt circle (M8) (□ 92 mm × 92 mm) | No | |
| Sim-pli.city SW7C | 2018 | 6×70 mm | Not included | 4×130 mm bolt circle (M8) (□ 92 mm × 92 mm) | No | |
| Sim-pli.city SW20 V3 | 2019 | 6×70 mm | Not included | 4×130 mm bolt circle (M8) (□ 92 mm × 92 mm) | No | 1000 r/min, 19.4 kg cm^{2} rotor inertia |
| Simucube 2 Pro | 2019 | 6×70 mm | Simucube SQR hub | 4×145 mm bolt circle (□ 102.5 mm × 102.5 mm) (M8) | No | |
| Simucube 2 Sport | 2019 | 6×70 mm | Simucube SQR hub | 4×145 mm bolt circle (□ 102.5 mm × 102.5 mm) (M8) | No | |
| Fanatec Podium DD2 | 2019 | Requires adapter | Fanatec QR1 quick release | No | Under, triangle: ▽ 78.4 mm (b), 66 mm (h) (M6) Side: ◦ Two screw holes on each side (M8) | 12-bit MHL200 rotary position hall encoder (Hall-position-sensor) |
| Fanatec Podium DD1 | 2019 | Requires adapter | Fanatec QR1 quick release | No | Under, triangle: ▽ 78.4 mm (b), 66 mm (h) (M6) Side: ◦ Two screw holes on each side (M8) | 12-bit MHL200 rotaty position hall encoder (Hall-position-sensor) |
| Fanatec Clubsport DD | 2023 | | Fanatec QR2 quick release | | | |
| Fanatec Clubsport DD+ | 2023 | | Fanatec QR2 quick release | | | |
| Simagic Dynamic M10 | 2020-01 | 6×70 mm | D1 spec | No | Side, rectangle: ▭ Via slots for T-nuts (M6) | LME2500FE encoder |
| Sim-pli.city SW8C+ | 2020 | 6×70 mm | Not included | 4×130 mm bolt circle (M8) (□ 92 mm × 92 mm) | No | |
| VRS DirectForce Pro | 2020 | 6×70 mm | Not included | 4×130 mm bolt circle (M8) (□ 92 mm × 92 mm) | No | 1000 r/min; rotor inertia 19.4 kg cm^{2} |
| Simagic Alpha | 2020-12-05 | 6×70 mm | D1 spec | 4×130 mm bolt circle (M8) (□ 92 mm × 92 mm) | No | |
| Fanatec CSL DD (with optional 180 W power supply) | 2021-04-21 | Requires adapter | Fanatec QR1 quick release | No | Under: ▭ 3 T-slots, 40 mm and 80 mm c-c (M6) Side: ▭ 2 T-slots, 70 mm c-c (M6) | Flux Barrier Rotor, hall-position-sensor |
| Fanatec CSL DD (with base 90 W power supply) | 2021-04-21 | Requires adapter | Fanatec QR1 quick release | No | Under: ▭ 3 T-slots, 40 mm and 80 mm c-c (M6) Side: ▭ 2 T-slots, 70 mm c-c (M6) | Flux Barrier Rotor, hall-position-sensor |
| Simagic Alpha Mini | 2021-06-27 | 6×70 mm | D1 spec | 4×130 mm bolt circle (M8) (□ 92 mm × 92 mm) | Side, two holes: ─ (50 mm) Under, rectangle: ▯ 67 mm × 80 mm | |
| Moza R21 | 2021-06-23 | 6×70 mm | D1 spec | No | Under, rectangle: ▯ 78.5 mm × 66 mm (M6) | 480 W, 262 144 ppr resolution, 1000 Hz USB, wireless wheel |
| Moza R16 | 2021-06-23 | 6×70 mm | D1 spec | No | Under, rectangle: ▯ 78.5 mm × 66 mm (M6) | 360 W, 262 144 ppr resolution, 1000 Hz USB, wireless wheel |
| IMMSource (IMMS) ET5 | 2022-02-12 | 6×70 mm | D1 spec | 4×130 mm bolt circle (M8) (□ 92 mm × 92 mm) | No | |
| IMMSource (IMMS) ET3 | 2022-02-12 | 6×70 mm | D1 spec | 4×130 mm bolt circle (□ 92 × 92 mm) (M8) | No | Wireless wheel, with USB-C as an alternative |
| Moza R12 | 2023-06-26 | 6×70 mm | D1 spec | 4×70 mm bolt circle (M6) | Under, rectangle: ▯ 78.5 mm × 66 mm (M6) | 216 W, 1000 Hz USB, wireless wheel |
| Moza R9 | 2022-03-10 | 6×70 mm | D1 spec | No | Under, rectangle: ▯ 78.5 mm × 66 mm (M6) | 180 W power supply, wireless wheel |
| Moza R5 | 2022-08-30 | 6×70 mm | D1 spec | No | Under, rectangle: ▯ 78.4 mm × 40 mm (M6) | Wireless wheel, with USB-C as an alternative |
| Moza R3 for Xbox | 2024-07-04 | 6×70 mm | D1 spec | 4×60 mm bolt circle (M6) | Under, rectangle: ▯ 78.5 mm × 66 mm (M6) | 72 W, 1000 Hz USB, wireless wheel |
| Logitech G PRO Racing Wheel | 2022-09-21 | 6×44.5 mm (1.75") | Logitech quick release | No | Table clamp | Separate models with support for either Xbox or PlayStation. The paddles can be used for gear shifting or for throttle/braking. Separate paddles for dual clutch operation. |
| Asetek Invicta | 2022-11-10 | missing data | Asetek quick release (with USB and power) | Front: Proprietary (M5) | Under: ▭ 2 T-slots, 87 mm c-c (M6) | Power and USB to the steering wheel through the quick release, via a hollow drive shaft and a slip ring. Integrated measurement of the motors torque output. Initial models only for PC via USB-C. USB-C hub with 5 ports for extra peripherals (pedals, levers, etc.). Integrated control electronics. External power supply via Molex connector. |
| Asetek Forte | 2022-11-10 | missing data | Asetek quick release (with USB and power) | Front: Proprietary (M5) | Under: ▭ 2 T-slots, 87 mm c-c (M6) | Power and USB to the steering wheel through the quick release, via a hollow drive shaft and a slip ring. Integrated measurement of the motors torque output. Initial models only for PC via USB-C. USB-C hub with 5 ports for extra peripherals (pedals, levers, etc.). Integrated control electronics. External power supply via Molex connector. |
| Asetek La Prima | 2022-11-10 | missing data | Asetek quick release (with USB and power) | Front: Proprietary (M5) | Under: ▭ 2 T-slots, 87 mm c-c (M6) | Asetek's entry-level model. Power and USB to the steering wheel through the quick release, via a hollow drive shaft and a slip ring. Integrated measurement of the motors torque output. Initial models only for PC via USB-C. Only one USB-C connection directly to PC. Integrated control electronics. External power supply via Molex connector. |
| Thrustmaster T818 | 2022-11-17 | No | New proprietary Thrustmaster quick release | No | Under: ▭ 4 screw holes, spaced 79 mm c-c lengthwise, 63 mm c-c widthwise (M6) | 168 W power supply, RJ-45 and USB-C interface in the base, proprietary 3-pin contact for electric signals via wheel connector. |
| CAMMUS C5 | 2023-06-09 | No | No | No | | First direct drive wheel top integrate motor and wheel integrated together |
| CAMMUS C12 | 2024-02 | 6×70 mm | No | | | Uses C5 Technology |
| Model | Introduced | Wheel bolt circle | Wheel quick release | Front base mount | Other base mounts | Other notes |

Legend:

- Industry standard or de facto standard
- Proprietary
- Missing

== See also ==
- Sim racing wheel § Comparison of racing wheels, for a comparison of other types of racing wheels
- Full motion racing simulator
- Linkage (mechanical)
- Motion simulator
- Power steering
- Sawtooth wave
- Servo drive
- Servomechanism
- Virtual reality headset
