= Ziehl-Abegg =

German manufacturer

Ziehl-Abegg SE
- Type: Societas Europaea
- Industry: Electrotechnology
- Founded: 1910
- Headquarters: Künzelsau, Baden-Württemberg, Germany
- Key people: Executive Board: Joachim Ley, CEO; Marco Altherr, CFO; Wolfgang Mayer, CTO; Dennis Ziehl, Supervisory Board Chairman
- Products: Fans and drives
- Revenue: 1 Mrd. €
- Number of employees: 5800
- Website: http://www.ziehl-abegg.com

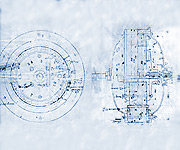
First Design of an external rotor motor

Ziehl-Abegg SE (own notation ZIEHL-ABEGG SE, until 2013 Ziehl-Abegg AG) is a German manufacturer of fans for ventilation and air conditioning applications, as well as drive technology for elevators and motors with matching control technology. The company's headquarters are in Künzelsau, in Hohenlohekreis, Germany.

The group owns

- ZIEHL-ABEGG SE, Künzelsau (Headquarters)
- Ziehl-Abegg Automotive GmbH & Co. KG, Künzelsau

as well as all international subsidiaries.

== History ==
In 1897, Emil Ziehl developed the first external rotor motor. In early 1910, the Ziehl-Abegg Electricity Company was founded in Berlin. Emil Ziehl and the Swiss engineer Eduard Abegg set up the company in Weißensee, a borough now part of the Pankow District.

Emil Ziehl had big expectations for Abegg, who was to develop wind turbines. After the company’s logo (with Abegg’s name on it) was already made public, Abegg failed to bring the promised funds. The introduced patent for the wind motors also turned out to be unsuitable. Abegg left the company that same year.

The plant in Berlin was dismantled and taken to the Soviet Union after the German Surrender in 1945, following orders of the Soviet Military Administration in Germany. In 1947, the brothers Günther and Heinz Ziehl re-established the company in the Künzelsau castle mill, this time in West Germany. In 1960 began the production of an external rotor motor as a fan drive. The internalisation of the company started in 1973 and, in 2001, it became a family owned, joint-stock company.

Sales subsidiaries can be found in Poland, China, Russia, USA, Czech Republic, Sweden, United Kingdom, Denmark, Finland, France, Italy, Australia, Singapore, Switzerland, Austria, Ukraine, Spain, Benelux, South Africa, Japan, Turkey, India and Brazil.

The founders of various competitors (Gebhardt, ebm-papst and Rosenberg) were employees of Ziehl-Abegg before starting their own respective companies. Wilhelm Gebhardt worked in the Development department, and Karl Rosenberg used to work in the Sales department until 1981, when he left to set up his own firm.

Several of the videos published by the company achieved millions of views. This significantly increased Ziehl-Abegg’s visibility beyond both its traditional market segments and its home region. German newspaper about early adopter Rainer Grill

Rainer Grill, the company’s press spokesman at the time, initiated Ziehl-Abegg’s presence on TikTok and regularly appeared in its videos. He is regarded as one of the most successful corporate influencers in the European B2B sector. Awards for Ziehl-Abegg with the frontman Rainer Grill at TikTok

== Products ==
The biggest division is the Ventilation division, in which axial and radial fans with a diameter from 190 mm to 1400 mm are produced. Ziehl-Abegg also has two further divisions which produce drives and the corresponding control technology. Application areas are i.e. Heat, clean room and refrigeration technology.

In the late 1980s, Ziehl-Abegg became the first company in the world to introduce EC-Motors (see Brushless DC electric motor) and use them for Ventilation Technology. In the 1990s, the rotor blades were sickled and in 2006 they were equipped with a bionic profile, in order to minimize the noise emissions. In 2013, Ziehl-Abegg was also the first company in the world to develop a Bio-Fan made entirely of a Bio-Polymer (in this case castor oil).

In the drives division, Electrical Motors for lifts, medical applications (i.e. Computer Tomographs) and Omnibuses are developed.

== Facilities ==
=== Ziehl-Abegg SE ===
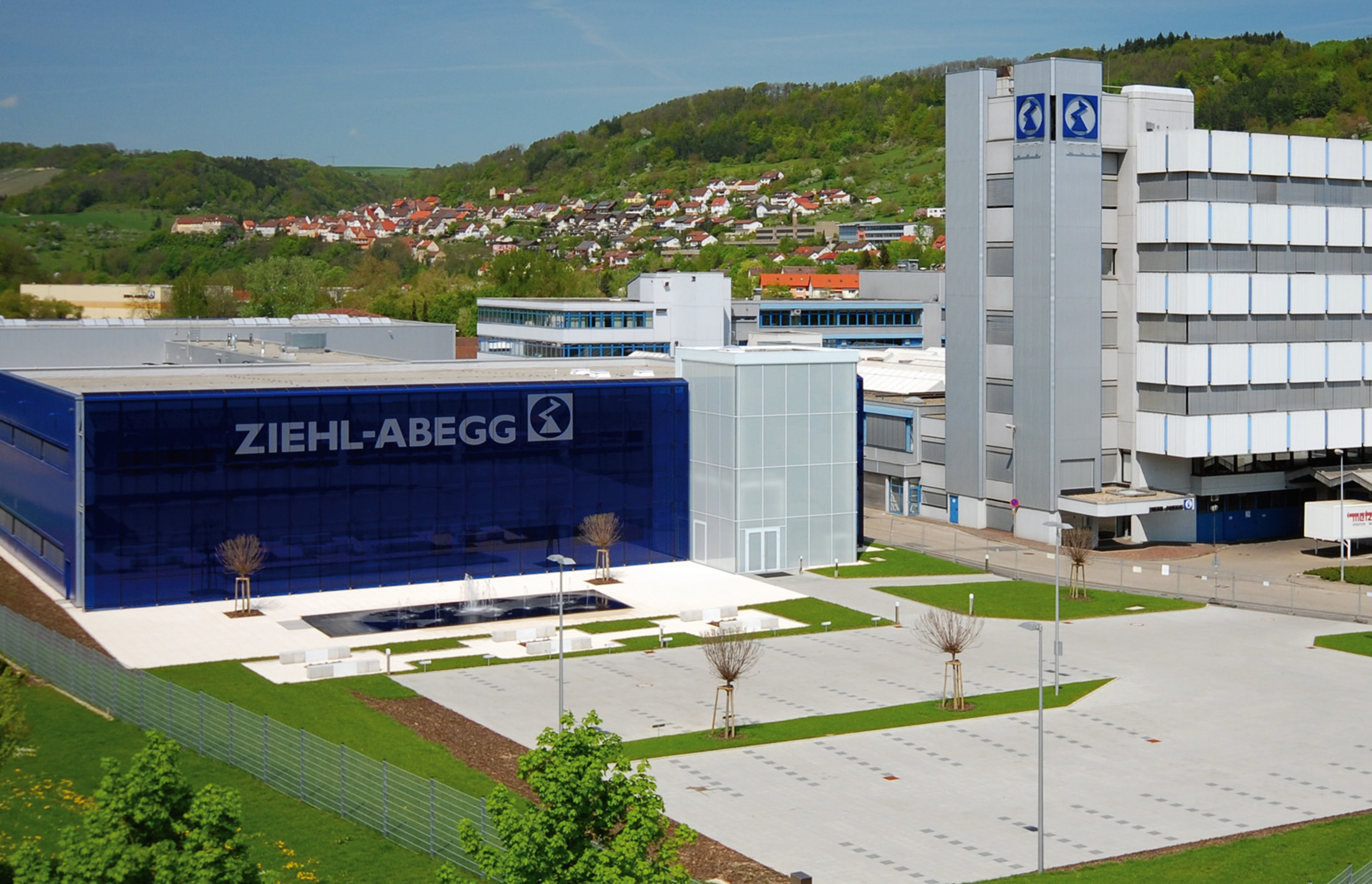
Ziehl-Abegg Offices in Künzelsau

The headquarters are located at the Heinz-Ziehl Street in Künzelsau, with a subsidiary plant in the nearby Würzburger Street. Built in 2008, the world's largest and most modern air flow and noise level test chambers for fans can be found in the main production site.

Further production sites are located in Schöntal-Bieringen (one facility) and in the Günther-Ziehl Street in the Hohenlohe Industrial Park, Kupferzell (ZA Kupferzell).

=== Ziehl-Abegg France SARL ===
The production site of electrical motors and complete Fan Systems for the Refrigeration and ventilation industry is located in Villieu, Lyon. 118 Employees work on an area of 10.000 qm.

=== Ziehl-Abegg KFT ===
ZIEHL-ABEGG Motor- és Ventillátorgyártó Kft. in Marcali (Hungary) was founded in December 1994 by ZIEHL-ABEGG GmbH. & Co. with a capital of 84.570.000 Forint. This plant manufactures Ventilation equipment, special electrical motors, axial and radial fans and accessories for agriculture, engineering, AC-equipment and cooling industry. The production of the parts consists of three facilities on an area of 62.000 qm in total.

=== Ziehl-Abegg US ===
Responsible for fulfilment of fans in the US and Mexico, the plant produces EC motors, AC fans, and ZA-Plus fans. The ECblue production centre was named following a suggestion from a prize-winning apprentice named Alex Morales.

=== Ziehl-Abegg USA ===
Ziehl-Abegg USA Inc. is the North American subsidiary of the German high-tech company Ziehl-Abegg SE, headquartered in Künzelsau, Baden-Württemberg. Ziehl-Abegg is actively expanding its presence in the United States to strengthen its position as a technology leader in ventilation, control, and drive technology. Location: Winston-Salem, North Carolina In August 2024, Ziehl-Abegg USA inaugurated a new production facility in Winston-Salem, North Carolina. Representing the company’s largest single investment to date, the plant was built with a capital investment of $100 million. The state-of-the-art facility spans 46,500 square meters and features advanced manufacturing technologies. Ziehl-Abegg's high level of vertical integration—including in-house sheet metal processing, plastic injection molding, and aluminum casting—enables the company to respond flexibly to customer demands and ensure short delivery times. In the United States, as elsewhere, Ziehl-Abegg is recognized for its sustainable manufacturing processes and energy-efficient solutions in HVAC, cleanroom, and agricultural applications. Economic and Regional Impact The new plant significantly contributes to the economic development of the region. By 2030, the facility is expected to employ approximately 800 people, underscoring Ziehl-Abegg’s long-term commitment to the North American market and to its location in North Carolina.

== Training and education ==
The percentage of trainees and apprentices in Ziehl-Abegg is close to 10%. In 2014, the German Chamber of Industry and Commerce gave Ziehl-Abegg the "Dualis" Label for its remarkable training programme.

In 2012, Ziehl-Abegg was honoured with the Human Resources Excellence Award for its outstanding Welcome Culture towards international employees. Ziehl-Abegg is also exporting the successful German Dual education system: the Ziehl-Abegg facility in Hungary is offering a cooperative study program (with an 80%–20% balance of theory and practice, similar to the special college system called Duale Hochschule) for 2016, following the start of the Dual Training System in 2013.

The Apprentice program in the US is built around the Guilford Apprentice Partners or GAP for short.
