= Ebm-papst =

German manufacturing company

ebm-papst Group
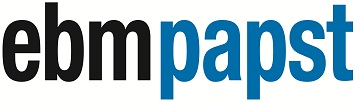
- Type: GmbH & Co. KGaA
- Founded: 1963; 63 years ago
- Headquarters: Mulfingen, Germany
- Key people: Klaus Geißdörfer (CEO); Raymond Engelbrecht; Sonja Fleischer (CHRO); Harald Kleiber (CFO); Frank Mayer (COO); Thomas Nürnberger (CSO); Tomás Smetana (CTO); Hannes Säubert; Mark Shiring; Jochen Frieß; Daniel Boese
- Products: Electric motors and fans
- Revenue: 2.408 billion EUR (2023/24)
- Number of employees: 13,800 (2023/24)
- Website: www.ebmpapst.com

Elektrobau Mulfingen GmbH & Co. KGaA is the parent company of the ebm-papst Group, a manufacturer of electric motors and fans. The group was formed in 2003 from the merger of the companies Elektrobau Mulfingen GmbH & Co. KG (ebm), Papst Motoren GmbH and Motoren Ventilatoren Landshut GmbH and operates international production sites (including in Germany, China and the United States). The head office is located in Mulfingen in Baden-Württemberg. Ebm-papst is owned by the Ziehl, Sturm and Philippiak families.

== History ==
=== Founding ===
In 1963, Gerhard Sturm founded Elektrobau Mulfingen GmbH & Co. KG together with Heinz and Günther Ziehl, the sons of Emil Ziehl, to build small fans. Elektrobau Mulfingen, which employed 35 people at the time, began the development and production of small external rotor motors a year before its official founding.

In the following years, the production capacity was expanded, including a 2400-square-meter hall with installed assembly lines that was built in 1971. In 1965, the first compact fans were developed: brushless DC electric motors. This was followed in 1974 by the development of the first compact fans in EC technology, which were more energy-efficient, and were initially manufactured for processes such as computer cooling, and later for cleanroom technology as well as home ventilation.

=== Expansion and rebranding 1980–2010 ===
In 1992, the company took over Papst Motoren GmbH in St. Georgen, which Hermann Papst had founded in 1942. By 1996, the company had founded its first subsidiary in China with a new location in Shanghai. The telecommunications manufacturer Alcatel sold its plant in Landshut to Elektrobau Mulfingen in 2000, and it was renamed Motoren Ventilatoren Landshut GmbH. The following year, the first energy-saving centrifugal and axial fans with integrated electronics were developed, on which the latter produced EC fans were based. At the same time, the company founded additional international sales offices.

In 2003, the companies were renamed ebm-papst Mulfingen, ebm-papst St. Georgen and ebm-papst Landshut, with the name ebm-papst resulting from the merger of the companies, and the parent company operating as Elektrobau Mulfingen GmbH.

In 2007, ebm-papst exceeded the revenue threshold of EUR one billion for the first time, and briefly employed more than 10,000 people for the first time in the 2008/09 financial year. In the same year, Gerhard Sturm withdrew from daily business to join the Advisory Board. Additionally, construction commenced on an energy-autonomous factory for energy-saving fans in Mulfingen-Hollenbach, which became operational in 2008.

In 2010, the company developed the GreenTech strategy, according to which every newly developed product is subjected to economic and ecological improvement in comparison to its predecessor. In 2013, Zeitlauf, a family-owned company founded in 1957 for epicyclic gearboxes, spur gearboxes and bevel gearboxes, was acquired. The company was initially renamed ebm-papst Zeitlauf, but later it was integrated into emb-papst St. Georgen and became a site of the company.

=== Product and business expansion 2010-present ===
In 2014, EBM-Papst introduced a new axial fan series and the Flowgrid guide grille was manufactured for the first time. In 2015, EUR 137 million were invested in expanding production facilities, including a new building in the Hagenmoos industrial estate in St. Georgen for the production of electronic components.

Following Formula One's adjustments to regulations for the 2014 season, favoring enhanced energy efficiency and hybrid technology, ebm-papst initiated a collaboration with the Formula One team Mercedes-AMG Petronas. The company provided top-mounted cooling systems for the F1 W05 racing cars. These cooling systems were developed to efficiently regulate the temperature of the cars' components, particularly when the vehicles are at rest. The partnership continued until 2015.

In 2017, ebm-papst built a 37,000 square meter dispatch center in Hollenbach and took over the Italian company LAE, which manufactures protective grids. In 2019, the Group extended its business operations in China, finalizing the construction of a 27,000-square meter production facility in Xi'an.

As a result of the Russian invasion of Ukraine in February 2022, ebm-papst ended its activities in Russia.

In 2022, ebm-papst reduced its supply to car manufacturers, fulfilling existing orders while declining new ones. In a strategic realignment, the company shifted focus towards the ventilation and heating technology sector, particularly targeting heat pump manufacturers and cloud service providers. In the same year, ebm-papst opened a production plant in Telford, Tennessee, in which almost 30 million dollars were invested.

In spring 2023, ebm-papst completed its 33,000 square meter Chinese headquarters in Shanghai, which combined the previous four locations in one building.

On April 1, 2025, the legal transformation of Elektrobau Mulfingen GmbH took place. Since then, the parent company of the ebm-papst Group has been operating under the name Elektrobau Mulfingen GmbH & Co. KGaA.

== Corporate structure ==
Elektrobau Mulfingen GmbH & Co. KGaA is the parent company of the ebm-papst Group. It also comprises both the German and over 36 international subsidiaries, as well as three German special-purpose entities in Landshut, St. Georgen and Mulfingen. The company generated a revenue of EUR 2.408 billion in the 2023/24 financial year and employed 13,800 people. About three-quarters of the company’s annual revenue is generated outside of Germany. Ebm-papst is wholly owned by the Ziehl, Sturm and Philippiak families.

The German production sites are located in Mulfingen, Niederstetten, Hollenbach, Landshut, St. Georgen, Herbolzheim and Lauf. The international production sites are located in China, the United States, Hungary, Romania, Italy, the Czech Republic, Slovenia, Taiwan, Serbia and India.

The international sales markets are served almost exclusively by the company's own sales companies. The primary fields of application include industrial ventilation technology, air conditioning and refrigeration systems, the heating and household appliance market, telecommunications, and industrial drive technology.

== Products ==
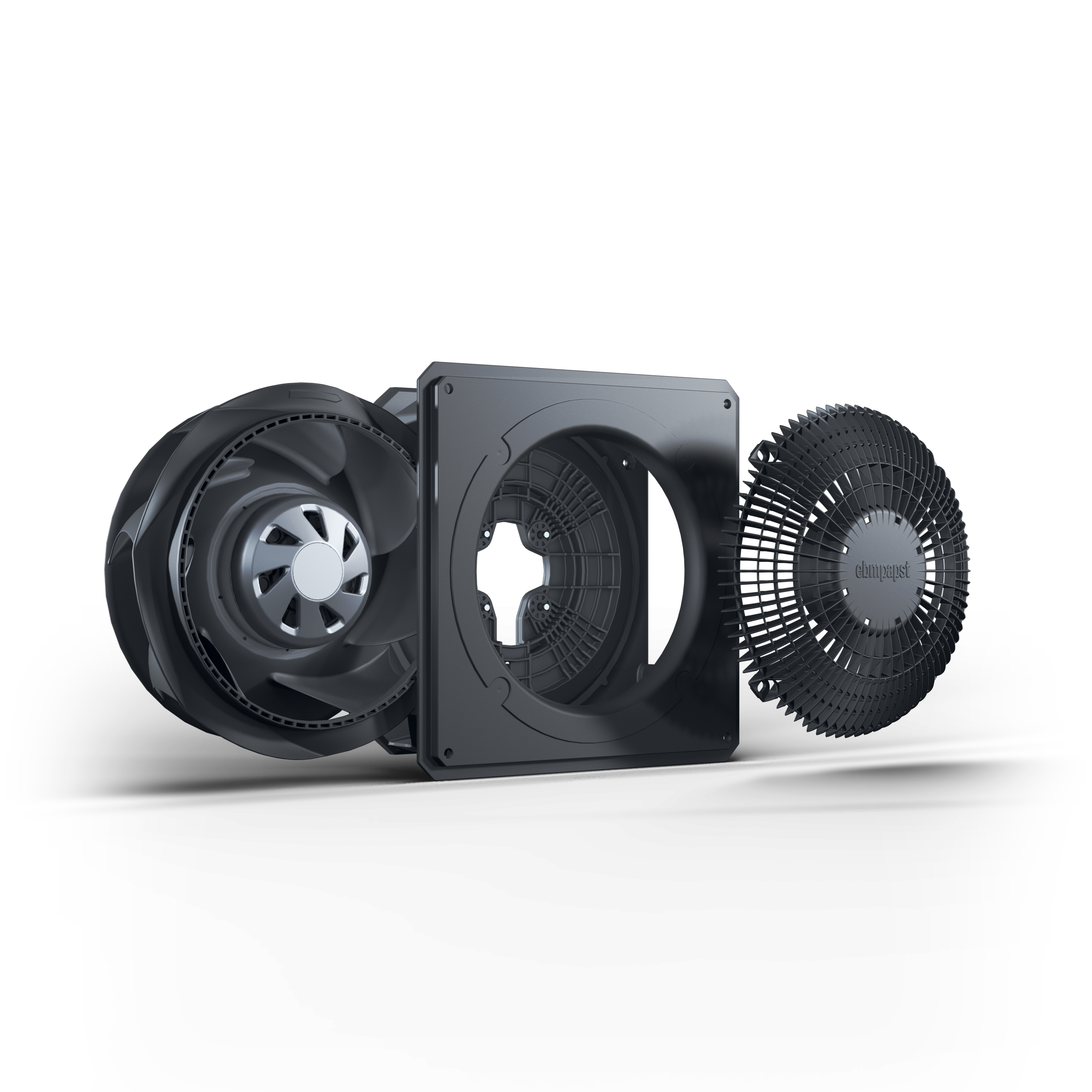
Compact fan made by Papst

Ebm-papst is active in the development, production and sale of motors, fans and pumps. The company is considered the world market leader for electric motors and fans and the leading supplier of fans for heat pumps in Europe. The motors and fans manufactured by the ebm-papst group find application in various sectors, including installations such as the Semper Opera in Dresden, on the roofs of supermarkets in Australia, as well as in computers and refrigeration systems. With nearly 20,000 products, the company has the largest product range in the world by its own account and supplies products for a variety of applications, including HVAC, household appliances, IT/telecommunications, and automotive and commercial vehicles.

The fans are mostly based on external rotor motors, since these enable the implementation of particularly compact axial, centrifugal and diagonal fans. They have axial or centrifugal impellers with diameters ranging from around 20 mm to over 1250 mm and are also developed in-house. Cross-flow fans, such as those used in façade ventilation, are also part of the offered products. The fan wheels are either made of plastic, metal, or a combination of both. This combination enables strength while retaining their conventional variable moldability.

Ebm-papst presented the HyBlade fan series for the first time in 2007, which improved the noise behavior and efficiency of large axial fans. The AxiEco fan series was introduced in 2019. Due to the three-dimensional shape of the fan blade, it was possible to achieve a higher level of pressure stability for axial fans. The air performance curves are steeper than those of comparable axial fans and operate with high efficiency even with increasing back pressure. These were mainly used in ventilation and air-conditioning appliances. Later on, the series was broadened to include the AxiEco Plug-in fans designed for heat pumps used in single or two-family homes. Another ebm-papst development is the AxiTone three-blade EC axial fan for noise-sensitive applications.

Electronically commutated (EC) motors, known for their quiet operation and energy efficiency, are increasingly used in various applications. These motors incorporate built-in electronics to control and regulate functions, such as integrated pressure, temperature, or volumetric flow, minimizing the amount of wiring needed compared to traditional devices and enhancing reliability by reducing susceptibility to faults. Additionally, EC motors can be interconnected and managed centrally through a bus connection. Classic AC motors for 1- or 3-phase alternating current are still available as alternatives.

The company also uses artificial intelligence, for example, to detect bearing failure patterns in fans.

== Awards (Selection) ==
Ebm-papst has received the following awards for its activities in the field of energy saving:

- 2008: Environmental Prize 2008 (Baden-Württemberg)
- 2013: German Sustainability Award in the category "Germany's most sustainable companies"
- 2016: German Brand Award for GreenTech
- 2023: Design Plus Award for the AxiTone axial fan
