= Cogging =

Cogging may refer to:

- Cogging torque, an undesirable effect in the operation of an electric motor
- Forge cogging, successive deformation of a metal bar or beam along its length using an open-die drop forge
