= Inrunner =

Electric motor whose outer shell is static

The term inrunner refers to an electric motor where the rotor (runner) is inside the stator. The term is in particular used for brushless motors to differentiate them from outrunners that have their rotor outside the stator. The vast majority of electric motors are inrunners.

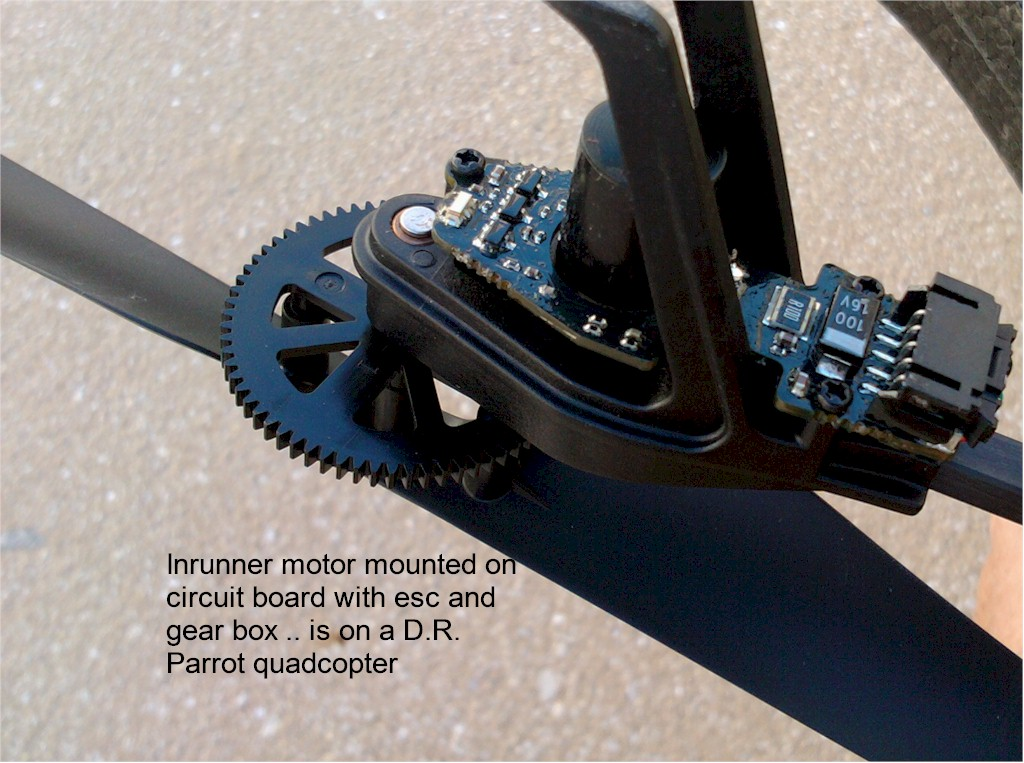
A brushless, geared inrunner motor in a quadcopter

== Usage in drones and model aircraft ==
Compared to outrunner motors, inrunners tend to spin exceptionally fast, often as high as 11 000 r/min per volt, far too fast for most aircraft propellers. However, inrunners lack torque. As a result, most inrunners are used in conjunction with a gearbox in both surface and aircraft models to reduce speed and increase torque

In many cases the inrunner is "ironless" in that there is no iron stator core to magnetize. The wire is run inside the can and held in place by epoxy or other resin material. Because there is no magnetic iron core, ironless in runners have no cogging, in that they spin freely with no magnetic interaction when power is disconnected. A well-designed ironless inrunner is extremely efficient. This is because there is virtually no iron magnetization loss and very little windage loss in the motor. However, due to the lack of a magnetic stator core, the ironless motor has very low torque but also higher motor velocity constant (K_{v}, a unit that is defined as r/min per volt) when compared to an iron core motor.

Modern brushless inrunners can have iron core windings to address the lack of torque while maintaining high r/min capability, more commonly used in radio-controlled car and truck applications

== See also ==
- Outrunner
