= Emil Ziehl =

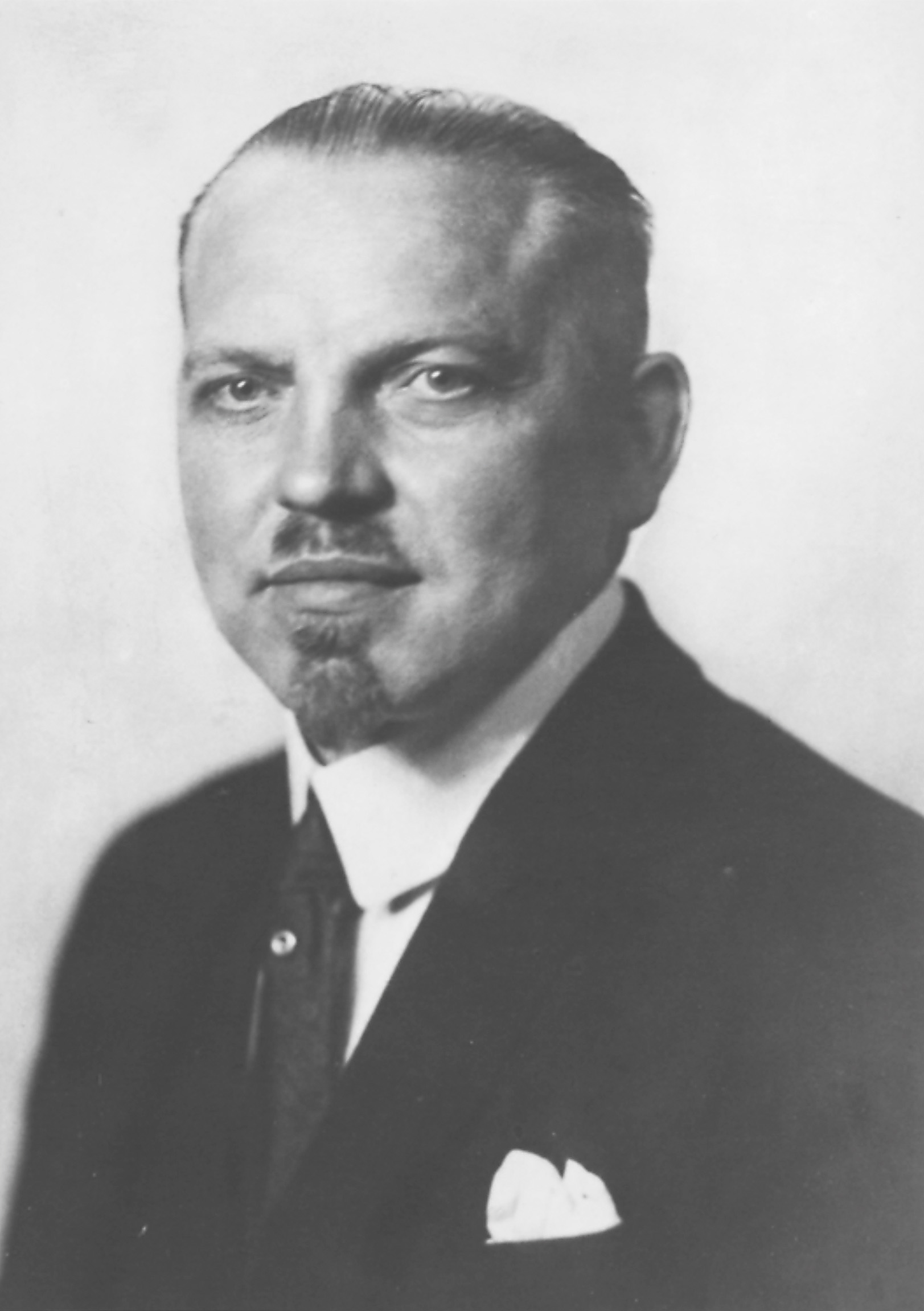
Emil Ziehl

Emil Ziehl's signature

Emil Ziehl (1873 – 1 June 1939) was a German engineer and entrepreneur.

He grew up with five other siblings in his father's blacksmith's and cart workshop in Brandenburg, and was supposed to start an apprenticeship in the family business. Due to the drawing talent shown by the young Ziehl, his teacher convinced Ziehl's father to send him to the Rackow Drawing School.

Following his professor's recommendation, he started working at AEG as an engineer. In the development of electro-motors, he pioneered in the messing and testing of generators. In 1897, he began at Berliner Maschinenbau AG, where he developed the first rotor powered by electricity with cardanic suspension and with that the first external rotor motor. The German patent was given in 1904, with the US-patent already granted on 27 November 1900.

With the Swiss investor Eduard Abegg he founded in early 1910 the company Ziehl-Abegg. Ziehl had big expectations for Abegg, who was to develop wind turbines. After the company's logo (with Abegg's name on it) was already made public, Abegg failed to bring the promised funds. The introduced patent for the wind motors also turned out to be unsuitable. Abegg left the company two months later.

Ziehl had three daughters and two sons. The eldest son, Günther Ziehl, was born on 5 September 1913 and the youngest, Heinz, in 1917. Günther Ziehl began his studies in 1935 at the Technische Hochschule in Charlottenburg (now Technische Universität Berlin)] and later led his father's company.

The Schöntal community in Baden-Württemberg acknowledged the work of Ziehl in 2015 naming a street after him. The street is located in Bieringen, a locality of Schöntal where Ziehl-Abegg has a production plant. The street sign was presented on the occasion of the 50-year celebration of production work at Schöntal-Bieringen. The mayor, Patrizia Filz, presented this sign to the grandson of Ziehl, Uwe Ziehl.

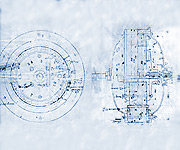
First Design of an external rotor motor

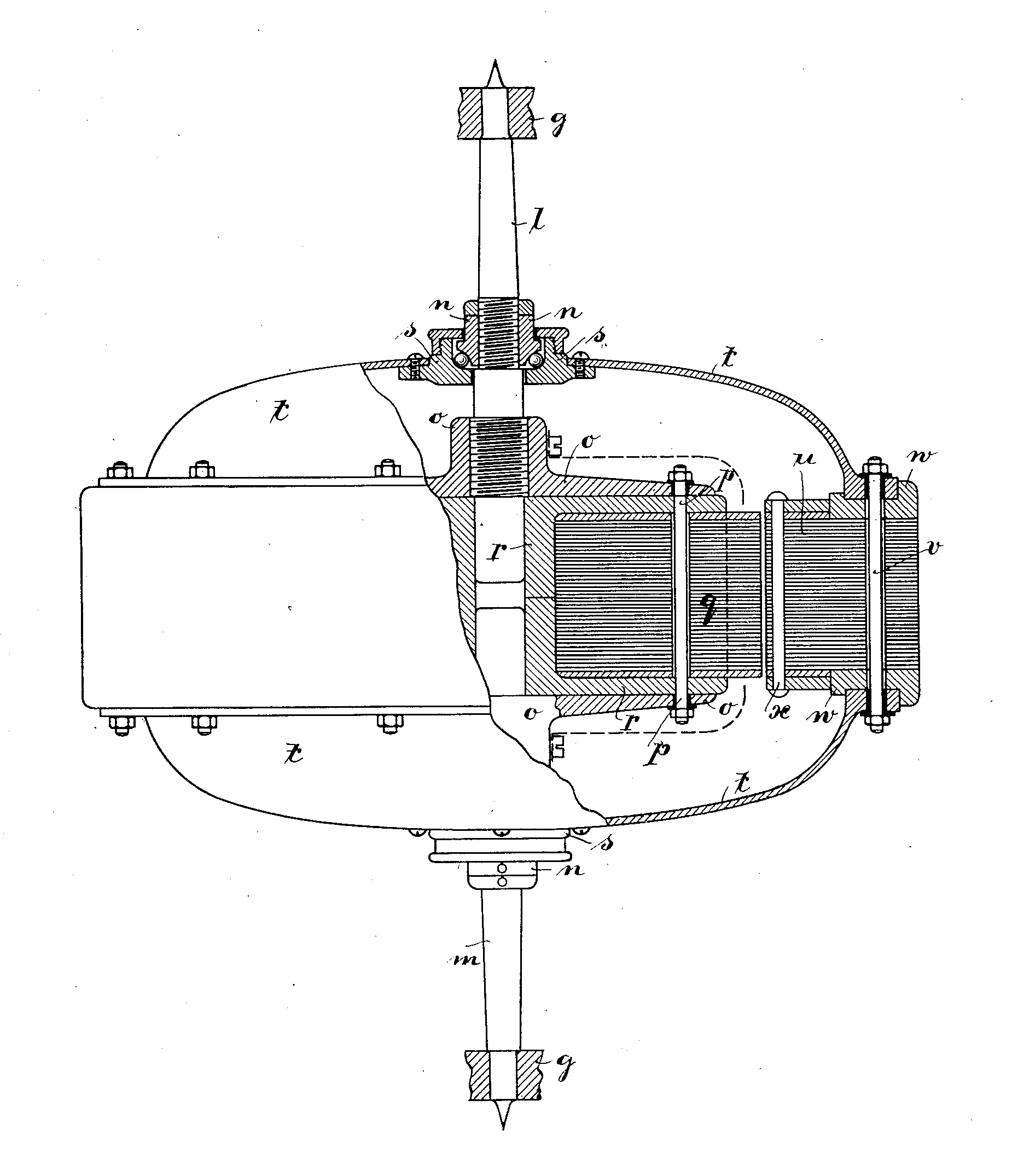
Drawing of the external rotor motor from the US-Patent US662484 A
