= Dual-rotor motor =

Motor having two rotors

A dual-rotor motor is a motor having two rotors within the same motor housing. This rotor arrangement can increase power volume density, efficiency, and reduce cogging torque.

== Stator on the outside ==
In one arrangement, the motor has an ordinary stator. A squirrel-cage rotor connected to the output shaft rotates within the stator at slightly less than the rotating field from the stator. Within the squirrel-cage rotor is a freely rotating permanent magnet rotor, which is locked in with rotating field from the stator. The effect of the inner rotor is to reenforce the field from the stator. Because the stator slips behind the rotating magnetic field inducing a current in the rotor, this type of motor meets the definition of an induction motor.

== Stator between rotors ==
The inner rotor is in the center, surrounded by an empty space for the stator, which will be surrounded by the outer rotor

In another arrangement, one rotor is inside the stator with a second rotor on the outside of the stator. The photo labelled FIG. 8 is from a patent application. It shows two rotors assembled into a single unit, with eight permanent magnets attached to the outer surface of the inner rotor, and eight to the inner surface of the outer rotor.

Vendors are working on both axial and radial flux configurations. In one axial flux design, the rotor is a disk that sits between two symmetric rotor disks.
