= Motor constants =

Constants describing characteristics of electrical motors

The motor size constant ($K_\text{M}$) and motor velocity constant ($K_\text{v}$, alternatively called the back EMF constant) are values used to describe characteristics of electrical motors.

== Motor constant ==
$K_\text{M}$ is the motor constant (sometimes, motor size constant). In SI units, the motor constant is expressed in newton metres per square root watt ($\text{N}{}\cdot{}\text{m} / \sqrt{\text{W}}$):

$$K_\text{M} = \frac{\tau}{\sqrt{P}}$$

where

- $\scriptstyle \tau$ is the motor torque (SI unit: newton–metre)
- $\scriptstyle P$ is the resistive power loss (SI unit: watt)

The motor constant is winding independent (as long as the same conductive material is used for wires); e.g., winding a motor with 6 turns with 2 parallel wires instead of 12 turns single wire will double the velocity constant, $K_\text{v}$, but $K_\text{M}$ remains unchanged. $K_\text{M}$ can be used for selecting the size of a motor to use in an application. $K_\text{v}$ can be used for selecting the winding to use in the motor.

Since the torque $\tau$ is current $I$ multiplied by $K_\text{T}$ then $K_\text{M}$ becomes

$$K_\text{M} = \frac{K_\text{T} I}{\sqrt{P}} = \frac{K_\text{T} I }{\sqrt{I^2 R}} = \frac{K_\text{T}}{\sqrt{R}}$$

where

- $I$ is the current (SI unit, ampere)
- $R$ is the resistance (SI unit, ohm)
- $K_\text{T}$ is the motor torque constant (SI unit, newton–metre per ampere, N·m/A), see below

If two motors with the same $K_\text{v}$ and torque work in tandem, with rigidly connected shafts, the $K_\text{v}$ of the system is still the same assuming a parallel electrical connection. The $K_\text{M}$ of the combined system increased by $\sqrt{2}$, because both the torque and the losses double. Alternatively, the system could run at the same torque as before, with torque and current split equally across the two motors, which halves the resistive losses.

== Units ==
The motor constant may be provided in one of several units. The table below provides conversions between common SI units

Conversion Factor		Ending Unit					
Conversion Factor		$k_t, \frac{Nm}{A_{pk}}$	$k_t, \frac{Nm}{A_{RMS}}$	$k_v, \frac{V_{LL,RMS}}{\frac{rad}{s}}$	$k_v, \frac{V_{LL,pk}}{\frac{rad}{s}}$	$k_v, \frac{V_{LL,pk}}{rpm}$	$k_v, \frac{V_{LL,RMS}}{rpm}$
Starting Unit	$k_t, \frac{Nm}{A_{pk}}$	$1$	$\sqrt2$	$\frac{1}{\sqrt2}$	$1$	$\frac{\pi}{30}$	$\frac{\pi}{30\sqrt2}$
Starting Unit	$k_t, \frac{Nm}{A_{RMS}}$	$\frac{1}{\sqrt2}$	$1$	$\frac{1}{2}$	$\frac{1}{\sqrt2}$	$\frac{\pi}{30\sqrt2}$	$\frac{\pi}{30}$
Starting Unit	$k_v, \frac{V_{LL,RMS}}{\frac{rad}{s}}$	$\sqrt2$	$2$	$1$	$\sqrt2$	$\frac{\pi\sqrt2}{30}$	$\frac{\pi}{30}$
Starting Unit	$k_v, \frac{V_{LL,pk}}{\frac{rad}{s}}$	$1$	$\sqrt2$	$\frac{1}{\sqrt2}$	$1$	$\frac{\pi}{30}$	$\frac{\pi}{30\sqrt2}$
Starting Unit	$k_v, \frac{V_{LL,pk}}{rpm}$	$\frac{30}{\pi}$	$\frac{30\sqrt2}{\pi}$	$\frac{30}{\pi\sqrt2}$	$\frac{30}{\pi}$	$1$	$\frac{1}{\sqrt2}$
Starting Unit	$k_v, \frac{V_{LL,RMS}}{rpm}$	$\frac{30\sqrt2}{\pi}$	$\frac{60}{\pi}$	$\frac{30}{\pi}$	$\frac{30\sqrt2}{\pi}$	$\sqrt2$	$1$

$V_{Line-Neutral} = \frac{V_{LL}}{\sqrt3}$

== Motor velocity constant, back EMF constant ==
$K_\text{v}$ is the motor velocity, or motor speed, constant (not to be confused with kV, the symbol for kilovolt), measured in revolutions per minute (RPM) per volt or radians per volt second, rad/V·s:

$$K_\text{v} = \frac{\omega_\text{no-load}}{V_\text{peak}}$$

The $K_\text{v}$ rating of a brushless motor is the ratio of the motor's unloaded rotational speed (measured in RPM) to the peak (not RMS) voltage on the wires connected to the coils (the back EMF). For example, an unloaded motor of $K_\text{v}$ = 5,700 rpm/V supplied with 11.1 V will run at a nominal speed of 63,270 rpm (= 5,700 rpm/V × 11.1 V).

The motor may not reach this theoretical speed because there are non-linear mechanical losses. On the other hand, if the motor is driven as a generator, the no-load voltage between terminals is perfectly proportional to the RPM and true to the $K_\text{v}$ of the motor/generator.

The terms $K_\text{e}$, $K_\text{b}$ are also used, as are the terms back EMF constant, or the generic electrical constant. In contrast to $K_\text{v}$ the value $K_\text{e}$ is often expressed in SI units volt–seconds per radian (V⋅s/rad), thus it is an inverse measure of $K_v$. Sometimes it is expressed in non SI units volts per kilorevolution per minute (V/krpm).

$$K_\text{e} = K_\text{b} = \frac{V_\text{peak}}{\omega_\text{no-load}} = \frac{1}{K_\text{v}}$$

The field flux may also be integrated into the formula:

$$K_\omega = \frac{E_\text{b}}{\phi\omega}$$

where $E_\text{b}$ is back EMF, $K_\omega$ is the constant, $\phi$ is the flux, and $\omega$ is the angular velocity.

By Lenz's law, a running motor generates a back-EMF proportional to the speed. Once the motor's rotational velocity is such that the back-EMF is equal to the battery voltage (also called DC line voltage), the motor reaches its limit speed.

== Motor torque constant ==
$K_\text{T}$ is the torque produced divided by armature current. It can be calculated from the motor velocity constant $K_\text{v}$. For a single coil the relationship is:

$$K_\text{T} = \frac{\tau}{I_\text{a}} = \frac{60}{2\pi K_\text{v(RPM)}} = \frac{1}{K_\text{v(SI)}}$$

where $I_\text{a}$ is the armature current of the machine (SI unit: ampere). $K_\text{T}$ is primarily used to calculate the armature current for a given torque demand:

$$I_\text{a}  = \frac{\tau}{K_\text{T}}$$

The SI units for the torque constant are newton meters per ampere (N·m/A). Since 1 N·m = 1 J, and 1 A = 1 C/s, then 1 N·m/A = 1 J·s/C = 1 V·s (same units as back EMF constant).

The relationship between $K_\text{T}$ and $K_\text{v}$ is not intuitive, to the point that many people simply assert that torque and $K_\text{v}$ are not related at all. An analogy with a hypothetical linear motor can help to convince that it is true. Suppose that a linear motor has a $K_\text{v}$ of 2 (m/s)/V, that is, the linear actuator generates one volt of back-EMF when moved (or driven) at a rate of 2 m/s. Conversely, $s = VK_\text{v}$ ($s$ is speed of the linear motor, $V$ is voltage).

The useful power of this linear motor is $P = VI$, $P$ being the power, $V$ the useful voltage (applied voltage minus back-EMF voltage), and $I$ the current. But, since power is also equal to force multiplied by speed, the force $F$ of the linear motor is $F = P/(VK_\text{v})$ or $F = I/K_\text{v}$. The inverse relationship between force per unit current and $K_\text{v}$ of a linear motor has been demonstrated.

To translate this model to a rotating motor, one can simply attribute an arbitrary diameter to the motor armature e.g. 2 m and assume for simplicity that all force is applied at the outer perimeter of the rotor, giving 1 m of leverage.

Now, supposing that $K_\text{v}$ (angular speed per unit voltage) of the motor is 3600 rpm/V, it can be translated to "linear" by multiplying by 2π m (the perimeter of the rotor) and dividing by 60, since angular speed is per minute. This is linear $K_\text{v} \approx 377\ (\text{m} / \text{s}) / \text{V}$.

Now, if this motor is fed with current of 2 A and assuming that back-EMF is exactly 2 V, it is rotating at 7200 rpm and the mechanical power is 4 W, and the force on rotor is $\frac{P}{V * K_\text{v(SI)}}=\frac{4}{2 * 377}$ N or 0.0053 N. The torque on shaft is 0.0053 N⋅m at 2 A because of the assumed radius of the rotor (exactly 1 m). Assuming a different radius would change the linear $K_\text{v}$ but would not change the final torque result. To check the result, remember that $P = \tau\, 2\pi\, \omega / 60$.

So, a motor with $K_\text{v} = 3600\text{ rpm} / \text{V} = 377\text{ rad} / \text{V·s}$ will generate 0.00265 N⋅m of torque per ampere of current, regardless of its size or other characteristics. This is exactly the value estimated by the $K_\text{T}$ formula stated earlier.

EXAMPLE: Torque applied at different diameters, $K_\text{v (rpm/V)}$= 3600 rpm/V ≈ 377 rad/s/V , $K_\text{T}$ ≈ 0.00265 N.m/A (each calculatable if one is known), V = 2 v, $I_\text{a}$= 2 A, P = 4 W , (any 2 makes the 3rd, $P = VI$)
diameter = 2r	r = 0.5 m	r = 1 m	r = 2 m	Formula ($K_\text{v(rpm/V)}$)	Formula ($K_\text{v(rad/s/V)}$)	Formula ($K_\text{T}$)	shorthand
$\tau$ = motor torque (N.m/s)	0.005305 N·m	0.005305 N·m	0.005305 N·m	$\frac{30I }{\pi K_\text{v(rpm/V)}}$	$\frac{I}{K_\text{v(rad/s/V)}}$	$K_\text{T(N.m/A)}*I$	$K_\text{T} * I$
linear $K_\text{v}$ (m/s/V) @ diameter	188.5 (m/s)/V	377.0 (m/s)/V	754.0 (m/s)/V	$\frac{\pi r K_\text{v(rpm/V)}}{30}$	$r K_\text{v(rad/s/V)}$	$\frac{r}{K_\text{T(N.m/A)}}$	$K_\text{v} * r$
linear $K_\text{T}$ (N.m/A) @ diameter	0.005305 N·m/A	0.002653 N·m/A	0.001326 N·m/A	$\frac{30}{\pi r K_\text{v(rpm/V)}}$	$\frac{ 1 }{ r K_\text{v(rad/s/V)}}$	$\frac{K_\text{T(N.m/A)}}{ r }$	$K_\text{t} / r$
speed m/s @ diameter (linear speed)	377.0 m/s	754.0 m/s	1508.0 m/s	$\frac{ \pi r V K_\text {v(rpm/V)}}{30}$	$V r K_\text{v(rad/s/V)}$	$\frac{rV}{K_\text{T(N.m/A)}}$	linear $K_\text{v} * V = K_\text{v} * V r$
speed km/h @ diameter (linear speed)	1357 km/h	2714 km/h	5429 km/h	$\frac{3\pi r V K_\text {v(rpm/V)}}{25}$	$3.6 Vr K_\text{v(rad/s/V)}$	$\frac{3.6 r V}{K_\text{T(N.m/A)}}$	linear $K_\text{v} * V * \frac{3600}{1000}$
torque (N.m) @ diameter (linear torque)	0.01061 N·m	0.005305 N·m	0.002653 N·m	$\frac{30I }{\pi r K_\text{v(rpm/V)}}$	$\frac{I}{rK_\text{v(rad/s/V)} }$	$\frac{K_\text{T} * I }{ r }$	$\frac{\tau}{r}$
shorthand	half diameter = half speed * double torque	full diameter = full speed * full torque	double diameter = double speed * half torque	$K_\text{v(rad/s/V)} = \frac{2 \pi K_\text{v(rpm/V)} }{60}$$K_\text{T(N.m/A)} = \frac{60}{2 \pi K_\text{v(rpm/V)}}$	$K_\text{v(rpm/V)} = \frac{60 K_\text{v(rad/s/V)}}{2 \pi}$$K_\text{T(N.m/A)} = \frac{ 1 }{ K_\text{v(rad/s/V)}}$	$K_\text{v(rpm/V)} = \frac{60}{ 2 \pi K_\text{T(N.m/A)}}$$K_\text{v(rad/s/V)} = \frac{1}{K_\text{T(N.m/A)}}$	$1 = {\displaystyle K_{\text{v (rad/s/V)}}} * {\displaystyle K_{\text{T (N.m/A)}}}$$1 = linear {\displaystyle K_{\text{v(m/s/V)}}} * linear {\displaystyle K_{\text{T (N.m/A)}}}$
