= Asetek =

Danish cooling company

Asetek A/S
- Company type: Public
- Traded as: OSE: ASETEK; OSEBX
- ISIN: DK0060477263
- Industry: Computer hardware
- Genre: Computer liquid cooling
- Founded: 1997; 28 years ago
- Founder: André Sloth Eriksen
- Headquarters: Aalborg, Denmark
- Area served: Worldwide
- Key people: André Sloth Eriksen (CEO) Peter Dam Madsen (CFO) John Hamill (COO)
- Revenue: ▲58.194 million (2017)
- Operating income: ▼2.757 million (2017)
- Net income: ▼4.475 million (2017)
- Total assets: ▲49.176 million (2017)
- Total equity: ▲33.394 million (2017)
- Owners: Arbejdsmarkedets Erhvervssikring (10.5%) Clearstream banking (7%) UBS (6.5%) Sunstone Technology (6%)
- Number of employees: 93 (2017)
- Website: www.asetek.com

Asetek A/S is a Danish company (with operations in the United States, Denmark, Taiwan, and China) that designs, develops and markets phase-change cooling and liquid cooling solutions for computer systems. The company has two segments - the desktop segment and the data center segment. Asetek was founded in 1997 and is based in Aalborg, Denmark. The company is known for supplying desktop water coolers for companies like Corsair and NZXT. It has been credited for "taking liquid cooling mainstream".

== History ==
Asetek was founded by André Eriksen in 1997. Its first product was the Vapochill line of phase-change coolers. A year into its existence, Asetek's network of VapoChill re-sellers grew to over 35. In 2000, Asetek received an award from the Danish Ministry of Trade and Industry for being Denmark's most innovative company that year. The company was officially incorporated in the same year. In 2001 Asetek released the first 2-GHz personal computer and started a business partnership with Asus. In 2002, the new generation of VapoChill was released. In 2003, Asetek branched out into liquid cooling with its WaterChill brand of liquid coolers. In 2005, they released the first 12-volt pump system.

In the early 2000s, Chip-Con/nVENTIV and its Prometeia line of coolers emerged as the primary competitor to the Asetek Vapochill line.

=== Gen 1/2 ===
In 2007, Asetek announced its first OEM design to be used by HPs Blackbird Gaming PC. In 2008 Acer used Asetek to cool its new Predator Gaming PCs. In 2009, Dell made liquid cooling a standard feature on its Alienware computers.

=== Gen 3 ===
The gen 3 pump was released in 2010. It offered a reduced size when compared to their gen 2 but without compromising performance. The reduced height aimed to facilitate the cooling of GPUs such as the GTX 580 from PNY Technologies. These pumps are used by Corsair, PNY and Antec. They can be identified by the exposed motor portion on the cap.

=== Gen 4 ===
The gen 4 pump platform was released in 2012. It brought advances in the liquid flow and thermal performance compared to gen 3. The exposed section of the motor was removed from the top of the pump. It was the most-used platform in the company's history, being used by Corsair, NZXT, Thermaltake, Dell, HP, Intel and other companies.

=== Gen 5 ===
The gen 5 pump was released in 2015. It offered reduced noise and increased thermal performance. It achieved this through material and chamber optimizations. Gen 5 also brought a more efficient motor. The side inlets/outlets of the previous generations were replaced with a vertical inlet and outlet.

=== Gen 6 ===
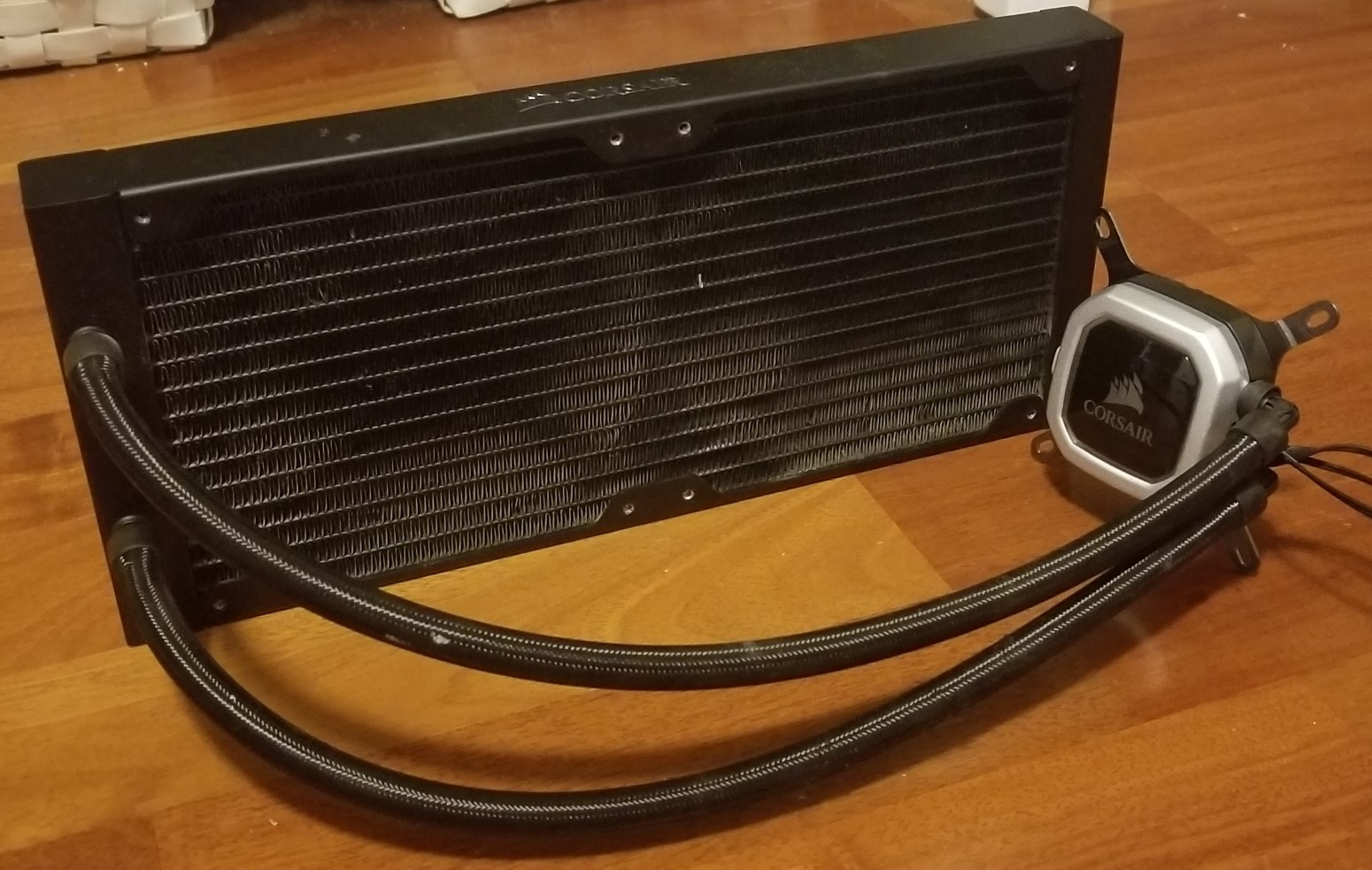
The Corsair H115i liquid cooler uses the Asetek 6 gen pump

First revealed at Computex by Corsair in 2017 and released in 2018 by Corsair with the release of the H150i and the H115i. As of yet Asus, Corsair and Gigabyte have released gen 6 Asetek pumps. Gen 6 pumps go back to the side-mounted inlet and outlet like gen 4 pumps. They also have a smaller cold-plate, the first change to the cold-plate in years.

== Products ==
Asetek manufactures and designs many OEM liquid cooling pumps for computers, both for data centers and desktop computers. The water coolers are used to cool central processing units (CPUs) and graphics processing units (GPUs).

== Patents and lawsuits ==
The company is well known for its patents and for its practice of pursuing ongoing litigation. It holds patents to many OEM liquid cooling systems and many liquid cooling pumps. The company also holds the patent for having the pump within the water block (the part that goes over the CPU or GPU). Many companies have also released models of liquid cooling AIO (all-in-ones) with this design. As such, Asetek has taken many companies to court on such charges. Asetek has successfully sued Cooler Master, Corsair and CoolIT Systems over these charges.

=== Patent losses ===
On October 12, 2020 the U.S. Patent and Trademark Office (PTAB) issued a Final Written Decision rejecting Asetek’s challenge all 21 claims of the CoolIT Systems ‘200 patent were invalid in light of certain combinations of prior art. As a result, all 21 claims of the CoolIT Systems ‘200 patent survived without amendment.

== See also ==
- Water cooling
- Computer liquid cooling
- Corsair
- NZXT
