= Günther Ziehl =

German engineer and businessman

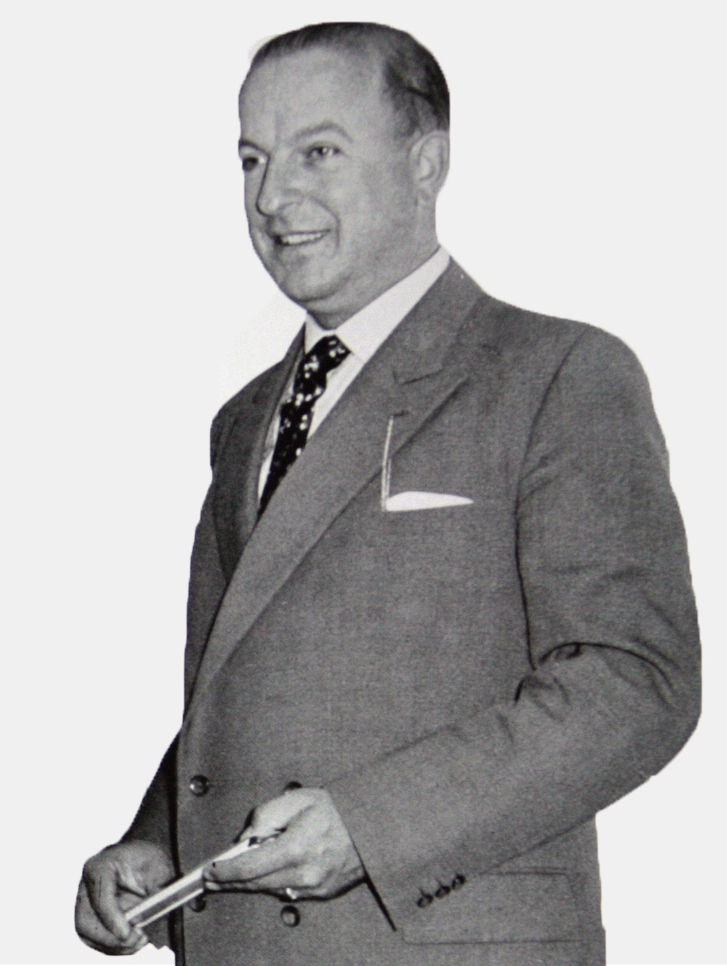
Günther Ziehl

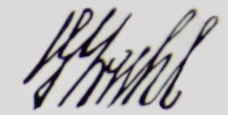
Günther Ziehl's Signature

Günther Ziehl (5 September 1913 – 20 July 2002) was a German engineer and businessman. His father, Emil Ziehl, founded ZIEHL-ABEGG, a company which was later led and rebuilt by Günther Ziehl.

== Childhood ==
Günther Ziehl was born in Berlin-Weißensee. His father’s company had been in business for three years by then, and Emil Ziehl used to take his son with him to work. This woke Günther Ziehl's early interest for technology and motors.

== Start at ZIEHL-ABEGG ==
After successfully passing the German Abitur, Günther Ziehl started his Engineering studies at the Technische Hochschule in Berlin-Charlottenburg (now Technische Universität Berlin) in 1934. As his father laid on his deathbed in 1939, he gave Günther Ziehl full power of attorney and control over the company. At that time, Günther Ziehl was preparing to take his final university exams. Emil Ziehl’s will was for his son to inherit the company, so at the age of 25 Günther Ziehl became the owner and leader of ZIEHL-ABEGG. The young student was now responsible for over 1000 employees.

A few weeks after his father‘s funeral, Günther Ziehl took his final exams and graduated as an Engineer. He then focused his time and energy to the family business and pushed the further development of ZIEHL-ABEGG. The production in Berlin got so big, that most of the German lift Motors were supplied by ZIEHL-ABEGG in the early 1940s.

== End of WWII and restart of the company ==
The war left the facilities in Berlin fairly untouched. The Soviet Administration expropriated the company after war’s end and demanded Günther Ziehl to dismantle the facilities and to load them in railroad cars. Everything was to be sent to Russia. Günther Ziehl himself was in danger to be deported, in order to accompany the transport and re start the production line there. Günther Ziehl saw no other possibility for his family and for himself than to secretly flee.

The company was dismantled and the Berlin Villa confiscated. In order to feed his family, Günther Ziehl started to work as a transport worker in Füssen. At night he would talk to local farmers, and convinced them to let him repair their electrical devices. He would take food as payment. Due to his open manners and his ability with electronic motors, his clientele grew rapidly. This led to the registration of an official electronical business in 1947.

The reliability of ZIEHL-ABEGG as a motor manufacturer and supplier was still remembered by many customers. One of them, Stahl Aufzugstechnik, sought to renew contact with the Ziehl family. The swabian business had been removed from Stuttgart to Künzelsau, in order to protect it from allied bombings. There, they still needed an expert in all things electronics and started searching for the known partner.

The fact that Günther Ziehl was the sole manager and director of ZIEHL-ABEGG until end of the WWII made the restart of the company easier and swifter. The name and the patents could be used again. Günther Ziehl also took plenty of construction documents and drawings with him as he fled. This proved to be a very wise idea.

From 1949 on, Künzelsau’s ZIEHL-ABEGG grew to become once again a respected company and a reliable supplier. Heinz Ziehl was brought to the company after his war’s imprisonment and together with his brother Günther, they further led the company.

== Social engagement ==
In Künzelsau, Günther Ziehl dedicated himself to the matters and issues of elderly people. He was one of the drivers behind the “House of Encounter”, a meeting place for senior citizens. He donated a building of his property for this end. He organized visits every year to the different nursing homes in the district, to which he brought small presents, together with the Hohenloher Wine Queen. The “House of Encounter” received praise nationwide, as it was the first institution of the kind. Günther Ziehl’s engagement did not end in Künzelsau, for he was involved across country in several organizations for the elderly. He actively participated in many of these organizations. For his commitment he received the Federal Order of Merit.

On 20 July 2002, Günther Ziehl died at his home in Künzelsau.

== Further recognitions ==
In 2014, a street in the Hohenlohe Industrial Park, where ZIEHL-ABEGG plants are located, was named Günther-Ziehl-Street.
