= Servo drive =

Electronic amplifier used to power electric servomechanisms

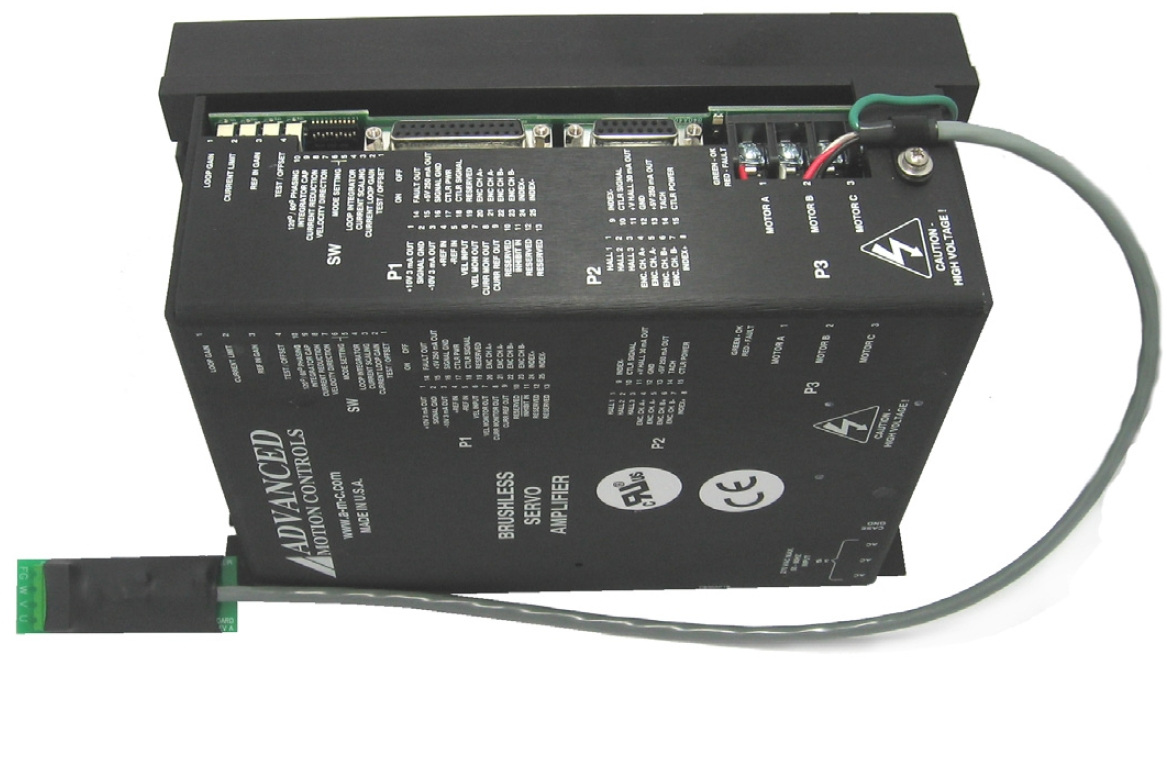
Brushless servo amplifier with armature connection from Advanced Motion Control

A servo drive is an electronic amplifier used to power electric servomechanisms.

A servo drive monitors the feedback signal from the servomechanism and continually adjusts for deviation from expected behavior.

== Function ==
A servo drive receives a command signal from a control system, amplifies the signal, and transmits electric current to a servo motor in order to produce motion proportional to the command signal. Typically, the command signal represents a desired velocity, but can also represent a desired torque or position. A sensor attached to the servo motor reports the motor's actual status back to the servo drive. The servo drive then compares the actual motor status with the commanded motor status. It then alters the voltage, frequency or pulse width to the motor so as to correct for any deviation from the commanded status.

In a properly configured control system, the servo motor rotates at a velocity that very closely approximates the velocity signal being received by the servo drive from the control system. Several parameters, such as stiffness (also known as proportional gain), damping (also known as derivative gain), and feedback gain, can be adjusted to achieve this desired performance. The process of adjusting these parameters is called performance tuning.

Although many servo motors require a drive specific to that particular motor brand or model, many drives are now available that are compatible with a wide variety of motors.

== Digital and analog ==
Servo drives can be digital, analog, or both. Digital drives differ from analog drives by having a microprocessor, or computer, which analyses incoming signals while controlling the mechanism. The microprocessor receives a pulse stream from an encoder, enabling the determination of velocity and position. Varying the pulse, or blip, allows the mechanism to adjust speed essentially creating a speed controller effect. The repetitive tasks performed by a processor allows a digital drive to be quickly self-adjusting. In cases where mechanisms must adapt to many conditions, this can be convenient because a digital drive can adjust quickly with little effort. A drawback to digital drives is the large amount of energy that is consumed. However, many digital drives install capacity batteries to monitor battery life. The overall feedback system for a digital servo drive is like an analog, except that a microprocessor uses algorithms to predict system conditions.

Analog drives control velocity through various electrical inputs usually ±10 volts. Often adjusted with potentiometers, analog drives have plug in “personality cards” which are preadjusted to specific conditions. Most analog drives work by using a tach generator to measure incoming signals and produce a resulting torque demand. These torque demands request current in the mechanism depending on the feedback loop. This amplifier is referred as a four-quadrant drive because can accelerate, decelerate and brake in either rotating direction. Traditional analog drives consume less energy than digital drives and can offer very high performance in certain cases. When conditions are met, analog drives offer consistency with minimal “jitter” at standstills. Some analog servo drives do not need a torque amplifier and rely on velocity amplifiers for situation where speed is more important.

== Use in industry ==
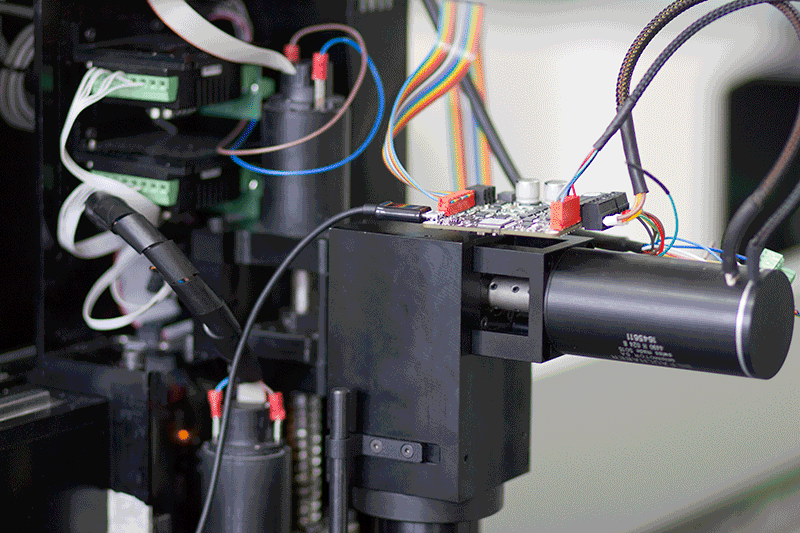
OEM servo drive from INGENIA installed on CNC router machine controlling a Faulhaber motor

Servo systems can be used in CNC machining, factory automation, and robotics, among other uses. Their main advantage over traditional DC or AC motors is the addition of motor feedback. This feedback can be used to detect unwanted motion, or to ensure the accuracy of the commanded motion. The feedback is generally provided by an encoder of some sort. Servos, in constant speed changing use, have a better life cycle than typical AC wound motors. Servo motors can also act as a brake by shunting off generated electricity from the motor itself.

== See also ==
- Control theory
- Motion control
