= Outrunner =

Type of brushless DC electric motor

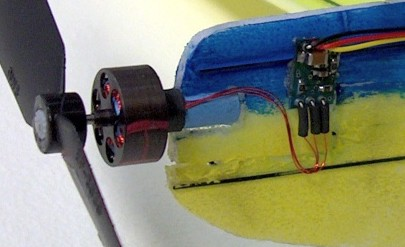
An outrunner electric motor mounted in the nose of a radio controlled model plane

An outrunner is a Brushless DC electric motor having the rotor outside the Stator (electric machines), as though the motor were turned inside out. Outrunners are widely used in industrial machinery, Heating, ventilation, and air conditioning (HVAC) systems, computer cooling fans, laundry washing machines, CD and DVD drives, electric bikes, electric scooters, and in models, including radio-controlled model aircraft.

This type of motor has permanent magnets in its rotor (outer shell), which spins around its stator windings. Because of the size of the rotor, outrunners generally have more poles than traditional or inrunner electric motors, where the space for poles is constrained by the size of the rotor. Outrunners require more complex control circuits than motors with the traditional inrunner layout. They are noted for excellent controllability and producing more torque than traditional brushed motors.

This makes an outrunner an excellent choice for directly driving variable speed machinery such as HVAC circulating fans, laundry machines, conveyor belts, and for model electric aircraft propellers since they eliminate the extra weight, inefficiency, complexity and noise of using a gearbox to achieve variable speeds.

Outrunner motors are available in an increasing number of powers, voltages and sizes as their applications expand.

== Stator and magnetic pole count ==
Outrunner motors are DC brushless motor controllers. The stationary (stator) windings of an outrunner motor are controlled by an electronic controller, rather than a physical commutator as in conventional brushed DC motors. A direct current is typically passed through three or more non-adjacent windings together, and the group so energized is alternated electronically based upon rotor position feedback. The number of permanent magnets in the rotor does not match the number of stator poles, however. This is to reduce cogging torque and create a sinusoidal back emf. The number of magnet poles divided by 2 gives the ratio of magnetic field frequency to motor rotation frequency. Variable torque and speed are further controlled by high frequency Pulse-width modulation (being switched on and off at high frequency) of the direct current.

=== Common stator pole/magnet pole configurations ===
N denotes number of stator "wire wound" poles, P denotes number of rotor "permanent magnet" poles.

- 9N,12P - very common to many small outrunners. This is also the most common CD-ROM motor configuration. Winding Pattern is ABCABCABC
- 9N, 6P - Common for helicopter motor, EDFs, and other high speed applications. The winding pattern is ABCABCABC
- 12N, 14P (DLRK) - Common for higher torque applications. Noted commonly for its smooth and quiet operation. Winding Pattern is AabBCcaABbcC (lowercase implies reverse in winding direction).

=== Other configurations ===
- 9N, 8P - Magnetically imbalanced motor configuration occasionally found in high speed applications. This configuration is best terminated as WYE to minimize vibration.
- 9N, 10P - Highly magnetically imbalanced motor that often makes for noisy running. This configuration is usually only built by do it yourself motor builders. This motor is best terminated WYE. Winding pattern is AaABbBCcC
- 12N, 16P - A not so common but still used style. It has been overshadowed by the 12N, 14P. Winding pattern is ABCABCABCABC
- 12N, 10P - Higher speed variant of the DLRK motor. Occasionally found in helicopter motors. Winding Pattern is AabBCcaABbcC (lowercase implies reverse in winding direction).
- 12N, 8P - Even higher speed than the 12N, 10P. Winding pattern is ABCABCABCABC

== See also ==
- Inrunner
