= Cogging torque =

Torque in electrical motors

In electromechanics, the cogging torque of electrical motors is the torque due to the interaction between the permanent magnets of the rotor and the stator slots of a permanent magnet machine. It is also known as detent or no-current torque. This torque is position dependent and its periodicity per revolution depends on the number of magnetic poles and the number of teeth on the stator. Cogging torque is an undesirable component for the operation of such a motor. It is especially prominent at lower speeds, with the symptom of jerkiness. Cogging torque results in torque as well as speed ripple; however, at high speed the motor moment of inertia filters out the effect of cogging torque.

== Reducing the cogging torque ==
A summary of techniques used for reducing cogging torque:

- Skewing stator stack or magnets
- Using fractional slots per pole
- Optimizing the magnet pole arc or width

Almost all the techniques used against cogging torque also reduce the motor counter-electromotive force and so reduce the resultant running torque.

A slotless and coreless permanent magnet motor does not have any cogging torque.

== See also ==
- Dual-rotor permanent magnet induction motor
- Magnetic reluctance
- Torque ripple
