= Counter-electromotive force =

Voltage that opposes the change in current that induced it

In electromechanics, the counter-electromotive force (also called counter EMF, CEMF or back EMF), is the opposing electromotive force (EMF) caused by a changing current. The changing current leads to a changing magnetic field, and hence induces an EMF in the circuit by Faraday's law of induction.

== Details ==
For example, the voltage appearing across an inductor or coil is due to a change in current which causes a change in the magnetic field within the coil, and therefore the self-induced voltage. The polarity of the voltage at every moment opposes that of the change in applied voltage, to keep the current constant.

The term back electromotive force is also commonly used to refer to the voltage that occurs in electric motors where there is relative motion between the armature and the magnetic field produced by the motor's field coils or permanent magnet field, thus also acting as a generator while running as a motor. This effect is not due to the motor's inductance, which generates a voltage in opposition to a changing current via Faraday's law, but a separate phenomenon. That is, the back-EMF is also due to inductance and Faraday's law, but occurs even when the motor current is not changing, and arises from the geometric considerations of an armature spinning in a magnetic field.

This voltage is in series with and opposes the original applied voltage and is called "back-electromotive force" (by Lenz's law). With a lower overall voltage across the motor's internal resistance as the motor turns faster, the current flowing into the motor decreases. One practical application of this phenomenon is to indirectly measure motor speed and position, as the back-EMF is proportional to the rotational speed of the armature.

In motor control and robotics, back-EMF often refers most specifically to actually using the voltage generated by a spinning motor to infer the speed of the motor's rotation, for use in better controlling the motor in specific ways.

To observe the effect of back-EMF of a motor, one can perform this simple exercise: with an incandescent light on, cause a large motor such as a drill press, saw, air conditioner compressor, or vacuum cleaner to start. The light may dim briefly as the motor starts. When the armature is not turning (called locked rotor) there is no back-EMF and the motor's current draw is quite high. If the motor's starting current is high enough, it will pull the line voltage down enough to cause noticeable dimming of the light.

== See also ==
- Recoil
