= St. Andre Bessette Catholic Secondary School =

Coordinates: 43.01517°N 81.32926°W

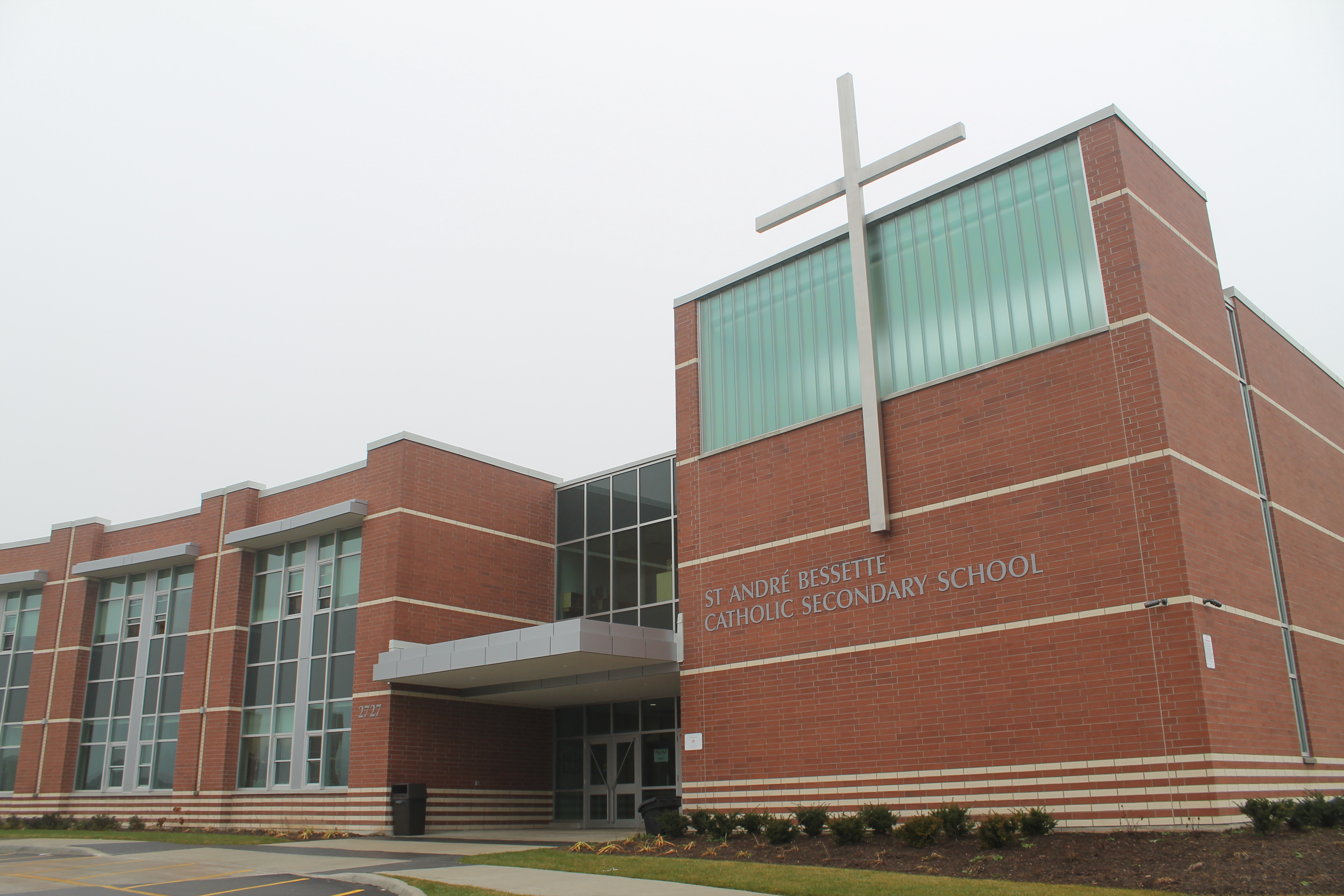

Location
- 2727 Tokala Trail; London, Ontario, N6G 0L8; Canada

Information
- School type: High school
- Religious affiliation: Roman Catholic
- Founded: 2013
- School board: London District Catholic School Board
- Principal: Patrick Gilson
- Grades: 9 to 12
- Enrollment: 1600 (September 2024)
- Language: English
- Area: North London
- Colours: Red, blue, white
- Mascot: Buster the Bulldog
- Team name: The Bulldogs
- Website: sab.ldcsb.ca
- Last updated: March 18, 2025

St. Andre Bessette Catholic Secondary School is a Catholic secondary school in London, Ontario, Canada administered by the London District Catholic School Board (LDCSB). It is the most recent high school to be built in the LDCSB, the last one being Mother Teresa Catholic Secondary School in 2000.

== History ==
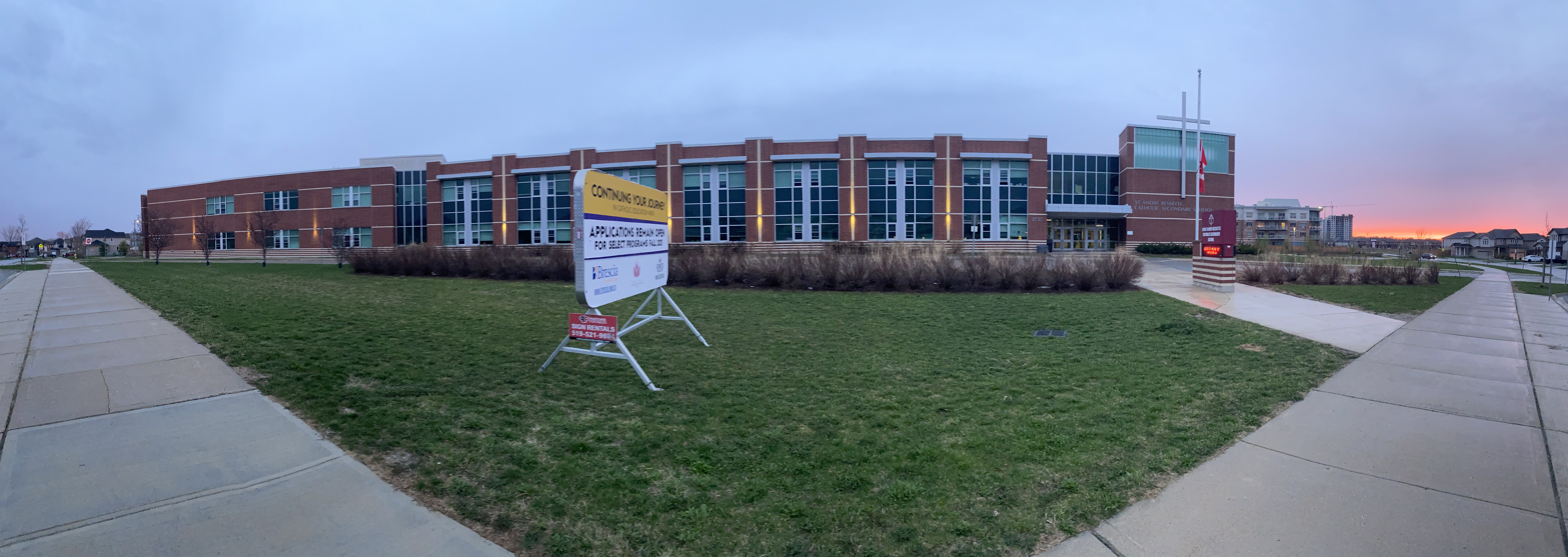
Panoramic photo of Saint Andre Bessette Catholic Secondary School

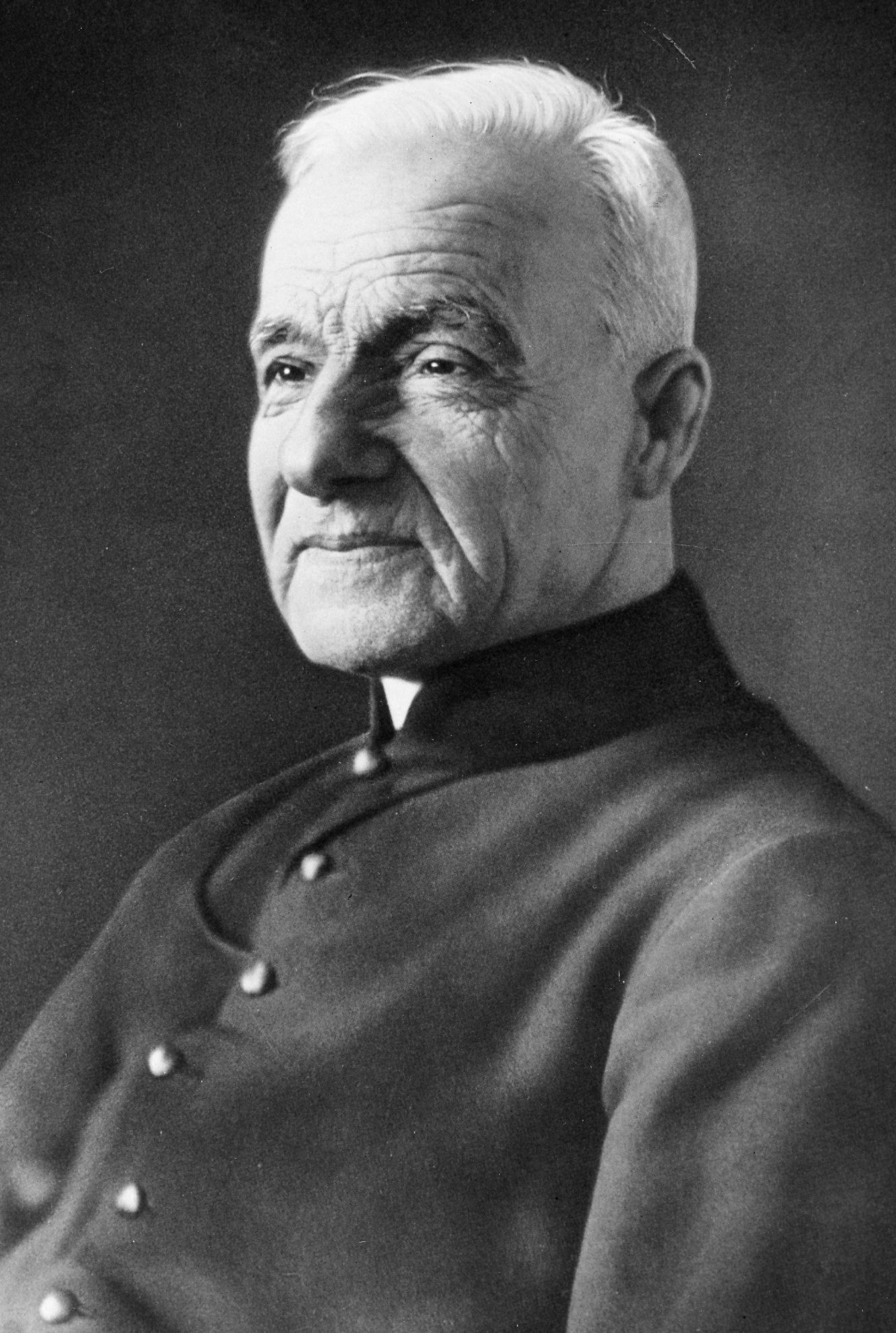
Saint André Bessette (August 9, 1845-January 6, 1937) is the patron of St. Andre Bessette Catholic Secondary School.

Construction of St. Andre Bessette started in 2012. It was built as a means to relieve schools that were over capacity, such as St. Thomas Aquinas and Mother Teresa, as well as to remove all portable classrooms from each high school. The construction of St. Andre Bessette resulted in the closure of 50 portable classrooms. The school opened in September 2013 for students in grades 9 and 10, with a student body of about 300 students. The first graduating class graduated in June 2016.

== Facilities ==
As the newest secondary school, it is equipped with new technology throughout the school. The school cost $27 million to build, and totals 135,000 square feet. The school is completely wireless, and trying to be paperless. The main staircase is used as a hangout for the students, with plugs built in it. The specialty classrooms include a health-care technology course, exercise room, dance studio, music room, arts room, and drama room.

St. Andre Bessette offers over 30 different clubs and extracurricular activities, including hockey, anime club, archery, recycling club, and photography club.

Courses include the Arts, Business Studies, Canadian and World Studies, Cooperative Education, English, French, Social Studies and Humanities, Religion, Computer Studies, Health and Physical Education, Mathematics, Science, Technological Education, and several e-learning classes.

== Feeder schools ==
All students:

- St. Thomas More Catholic School
- St. Marguerite D'Youville Catholic School
- St. Patrick Catholic School, Lucan

Some students:

- St. Catherine Of Siena Catholic School
- Notre Dame Catholic School
- St. Paul Catholic School
- Our Lady Of Lourdes Catholic School, Delaware

== See also ==
- Education in Ontario
- List of secondary schools in Ontario
