= Dieter Schwarz Foundation =

German non-profit company

Dieter Schwarz Stiftung
- Dieter Schwarz Stiftung gGmbH
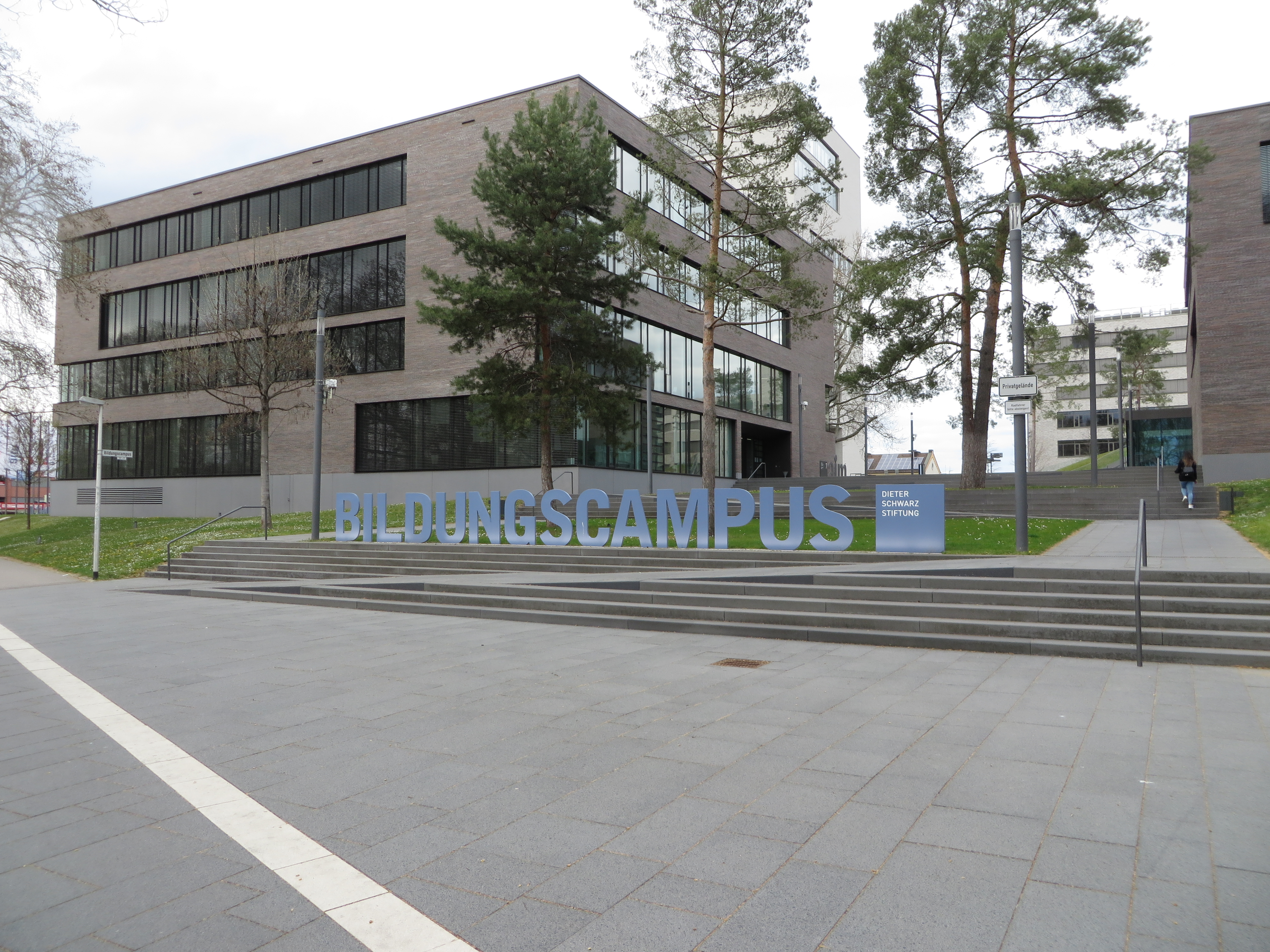
- Foundation office at Bildungscampus 9, Neckarsulm
- Formation: 1999
- Founder: Dieter Schwarz
- Founded at: Neckarsulm, Germany
- Type: Nonprofit organization
- Legal status: gemeinnützige GmbH (non-profit limited liability company)
- Purpose: Promotion of education, science, and research
- Region served: Germany
- Chairman of the Management Board: Reinhold R. Geilsdörfer
- Managing Director: Gunther Friedl
- Managing Director: Bärbel G. Renner
- Key people: Peter Frankenberg (Chairman of the Shareholders' Meeting)
- Parent organization: Schwarz Beteiligungs GmbH
- Funding: Distributions from Lidl Stiftung and Kaufland Stiftung (Schwarz Group)
- Website: www.dieter-schwarz-stiftung.de

The Dieter Schwarz Foundation gGmbH is the parent company of the companies Lidl and Kaufland via Schwarz Beteiligungs GmbH.

The Dieter Schwarz Stiftung is a German non-profit limited liability company (gemeinnützige GmbH) that is financed, through Schwarz Beteiligungs GmbH, from distributions of the two companies Lidl Stiftung and Kaufland Stiftung (both part of the Schwarz Group). The registered office of the companies of the Schwarz Group is in Neckarsulm. The main focus of the Dieter Schwarz Stiftung's activities is in neighboring Heilbronn. The management of the gGmbH consists of the former President of the Baden-Württemberg Cooperative State University Reinhold R. Geilsdörfer (chairman), Gunther Friedl and Bärbel G. Renner. Chairman of the shareholders' meeting is the former Rector of the University of Mannheim and former Minister of Science of Baden-Württemberg Peter Frankenberg.

== History ==
In November 1999, Dieter Schwarz founded the foundation named after him, among other things to promote education, science, research and entrepreneurship.

On 1 July 2002, the "Akademie für Information und Management Heilbronn-Franken" (aim) was established from the IHK continuing education center under managing director Harald Augenstein, based in Ferdinand-Braun-Straße in Heilbronn. Its goals were to improve young people's ability to train and study and to facilitate and support parents re-entering the workforce after a family phase. From the outset, aim has been supported by the Dieter Schwarz Stiftung, so that these measures could be offered largely free of charge. In 2003, the foundation's assets were estimated at three million euros, and in 2005 donations of five million euros annually were reported. The purpose of the foundation is "to promote education and upbringing, in particular through training and continuing education programs for daycare centers and schools, the promotion of new teaching and learning methods, and by inspiring young people for technology and the natural sciences." Furthermore, the organization supports "the promotion of science and research at universities, in particular through endowed professorships and the financing of a private university for business administration."

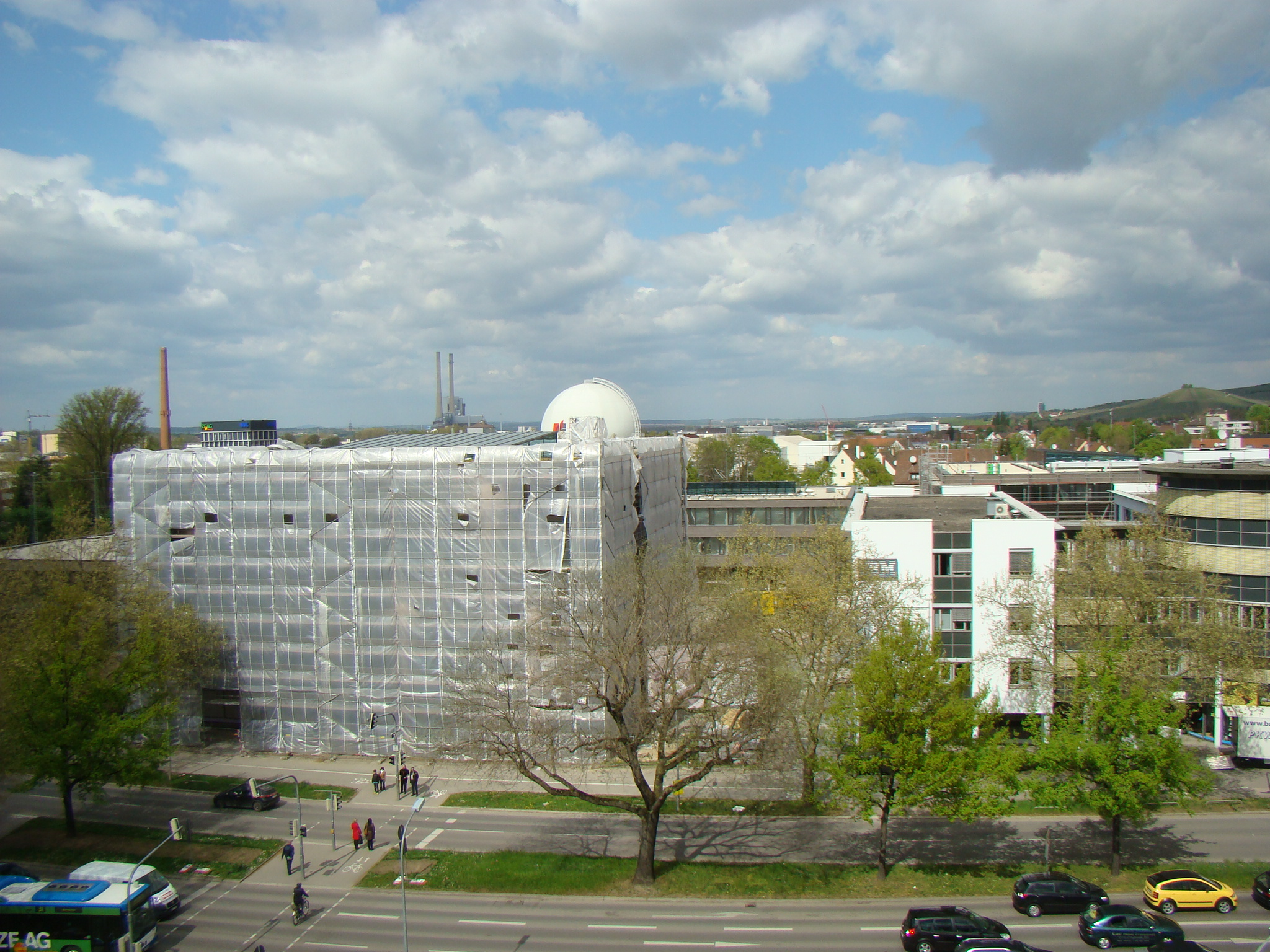
Bildungscampus Heilbronn under construction, April 2011

Initially, nine endowed professorships were established in Heilbronn, Reutlingen, Mannheim, Bruchsal, Halle (Saale) and Leipzig in the fields of electronic commerce and e-government as well as business ethics. With a donation of 510,000 euros, the foundation contributed one third of the renovation costs of Heilbronn's landmark, the tower of the Kilianskirche.

In the state of Brandenburg, the foundation supported a project from April 2005 to March 2008 called ZACK (Zukunft-Ausbildung-Competenz-Karriere), in which several regional educational providers worked toward integrating young people into primarily company-based vocational training.

In October 2011, the Bildungscampus Heilbronn, financed by the Dieter Schwarz Stiftung, was opened. At that time, it housed the German Graduate School of Management and Law, a branch campus of the Baden-Württemberg Cooperative State University Mosbach and the Akademie für Innovative Bildung und Management (aim). Less than a year after its opening, extensive expansion plans—largely financed by the foundation—were presented to accommodate the BWL-Food Management degree program, previously located in Bad Mergentheim, during 2013. Within ten years, the Bildungscampus has grown steadily and is now home to research institutions, universities and various opportunities for professional continuing education. The science center experimenta was expanded in 2019 with a new building funded by the foundation and, since 2024, has offered an AI pavilion inviting visitors to try out AI applications and learn about the opportunities and risks of the technology.

Since July 2020, the Dieter Schwarz Stiftung has participated institutionally in the basic funding of the foundation "Haus der kleinen Forscher" (now the foundation "Kinder forschen") and supports the strategic development of its programs. The programming school 42 opened its first German location in Heilbronn in June 2021 with support from the Dieter Schwarz Stiftung. In cooperation with the city of Heilbronn, the Dieter Schwarz Stiftung won the site competition for the Innovation Park Artificial Intelligence (IPAI) in July 2021.

In July 2022, the foundation announced the expansion of the Bildungscampus in Heilbronn. Groundbreaking on the new site took place on 5 May 2025.

== Activities ==
=== Current ===
- Bildungscampus Heilbronn:
  - Akademie für Innovative Bildung und Management Heilbronn-Franken gemeinnützige GmbH (aim)
  - Heilbronn University Campus
  - Baden-Württemberg Cooperative State University Heilbronn
  - TUM (Technical University of Munich) Campus Heilbronn (32 endowed professorships in Heilbronn, 9 in Munich)
  - Erzieherakademie
  - Programming school 42
  - Campus Founders
  - Ferdinand-Steinbeis-Institut FSTI
  - Fraunhofer IAO and Fraunhofer ISI
- Innovation Park Artificial Intelligence (IPAI)
- Experimenta Heilbronn
- Professorships at ETH Zurich

== Criticism ==
The foundation's engagement in higher education has also been viewed critically with regard to possible influence on higher education policy in the state of Baden-Württemberg. The planned establishment of a branch campus of the Bavarian Technical University of Munich in Heilbronn, Baden-Württemberg, was also the subject of political discussions in the Baden-Württemberg state parliament.

The managing director Reinhold Geilsdörfer has also been controversial: while serving as acting president of DHBW, he was already active for the organization. In connection with the establishment of DHBW in Heilbronn, Geilsdörfer also had to face allegations of accepting advantages in favor of Dieter Schwarz Stiftung GmbH. These allegations were completely rejected by the Heilbronn public prosecutor's office after they had already been fully refuted by the Stuttgart public prosecutor's office. Geilsdörfer reserved the right to take legal action against the complainant.

The Bildungscampus is private property owned by the Dieter Schwarz Stiftung. Due to its largely public accessibility, the exercise of private property rights (house rules) is the subject of public discussion. The house rules prohibit, among other things, the consumption of alcohol as well as ball games and inline skating.
