= Ipai =

Ipai or IPAI may refer to:

- Innovation Park Artificial Intelligence, an artificial intelligence innovation platform and campus under construction in Heilbronn, Germany
- Ipai, a subgroup of the Kumeyaay indigenous people of San Diego County, California
  - Ipai language spoken by the subgroup
- IPAI-26 Tuca, a Brazilian light aircraft developed at the Escola de Engenharia de São Carlos
- Olyk Ipai (1912–1937), a Mari poet
