= Dual education =

Dual education may refer to:

- Dual education system
- Dual-sector education
