= Sídlisko Juh, Pezinok =

Neighborhood in Slovokia

Sídlisko Juh
- Neighborhood
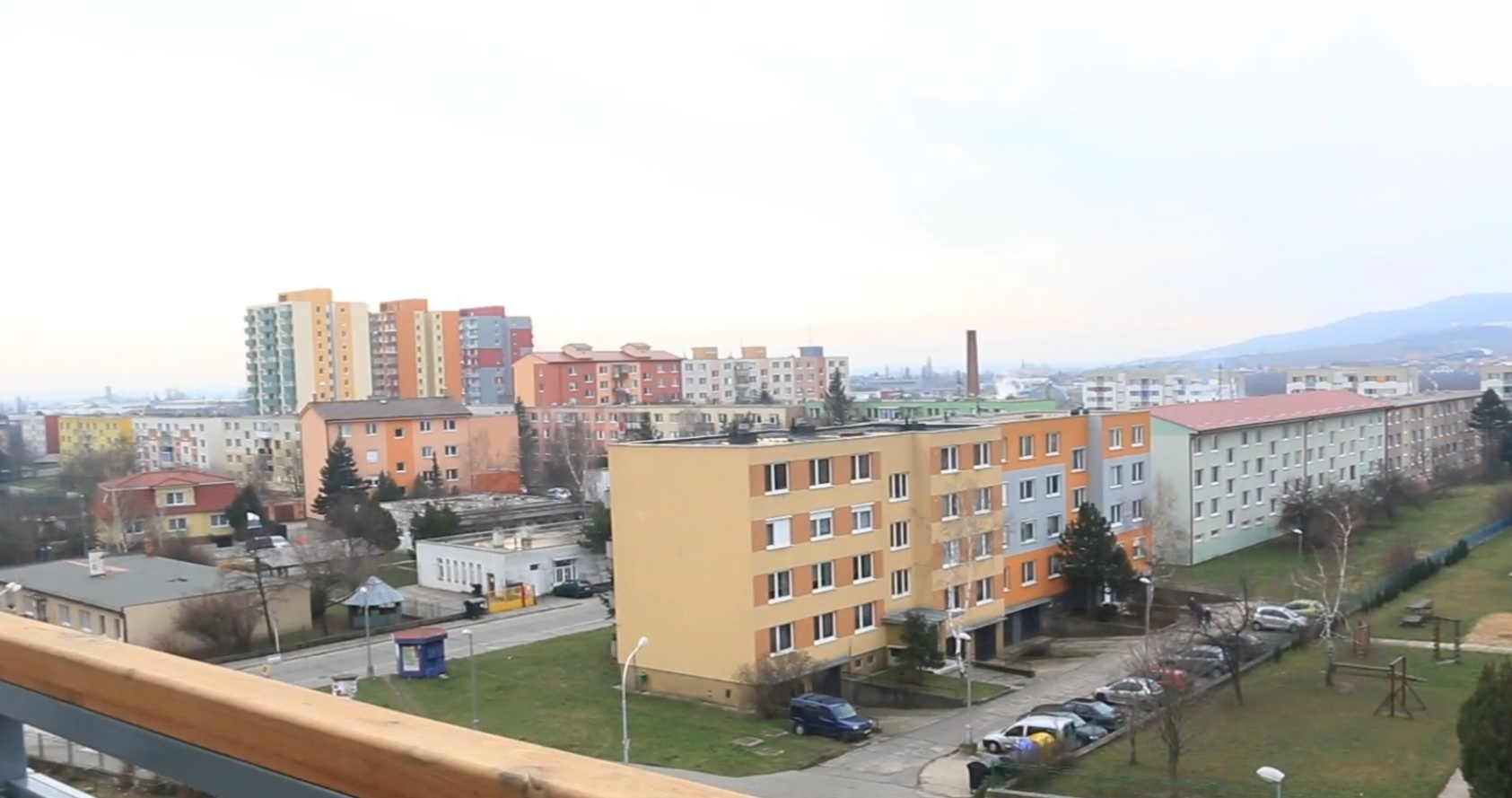
- Sídlisko Juh in 2015

- Location of Sídlisko Juh, Pezinok in Slovakia
- Coordinates: 48.282444°N 17.257396°E
- Country: Slovakia
- Region: Bratislava
- District: Pezinok
- Town: Pezinok
- First mention: 1974
- Postal code: 902 01
- Car plate: PK

Sídlisko Juh (Slovak pronunciation: ['siːdliskɔ 'jux], "South housing estate") is the second largest is the second-largest sídlisko ("housing estate") in the town in Pezinok, Slovakia. It is located in the southern part of the town near the Starý dvor sídlisko, which lies to the northwest, and the Sahara area, which is to the west of the estate.

On Bystrická Street there is a kindergarten and the Kocka shopping center. Also located in this neighborhood is a care center for pensioners, a combined school, an indoor swimming pool, the SOŠ Sports Hall of the secondary professional school (formerly secondary vocational school) and the former location of said secondary professional school, which until 2025 housed the Narnia Church Elementary School, on Komenského Street.

== History ==
Sídlisko Juh began to write its history in the 1970s. The preparation of the Juh housing estate for concentrated industrial construction was one of the main goals of the 1971–1975 five-year electoral program. A detailed urban plan for the new dominant district of Pezinok was drawn up as early as 1972. According to this plan, they would build 485 housing units, shops, services, a restaurant, a transformer station, a heating exchange station, eleven playgrounds for children, and a kindergarten that supports 90 children.

The first apartment buildings in this part of Pezinok were constructed at the end of 1974 by Pozemné stavby Trnava, Pezinok division.

== Gallery ==
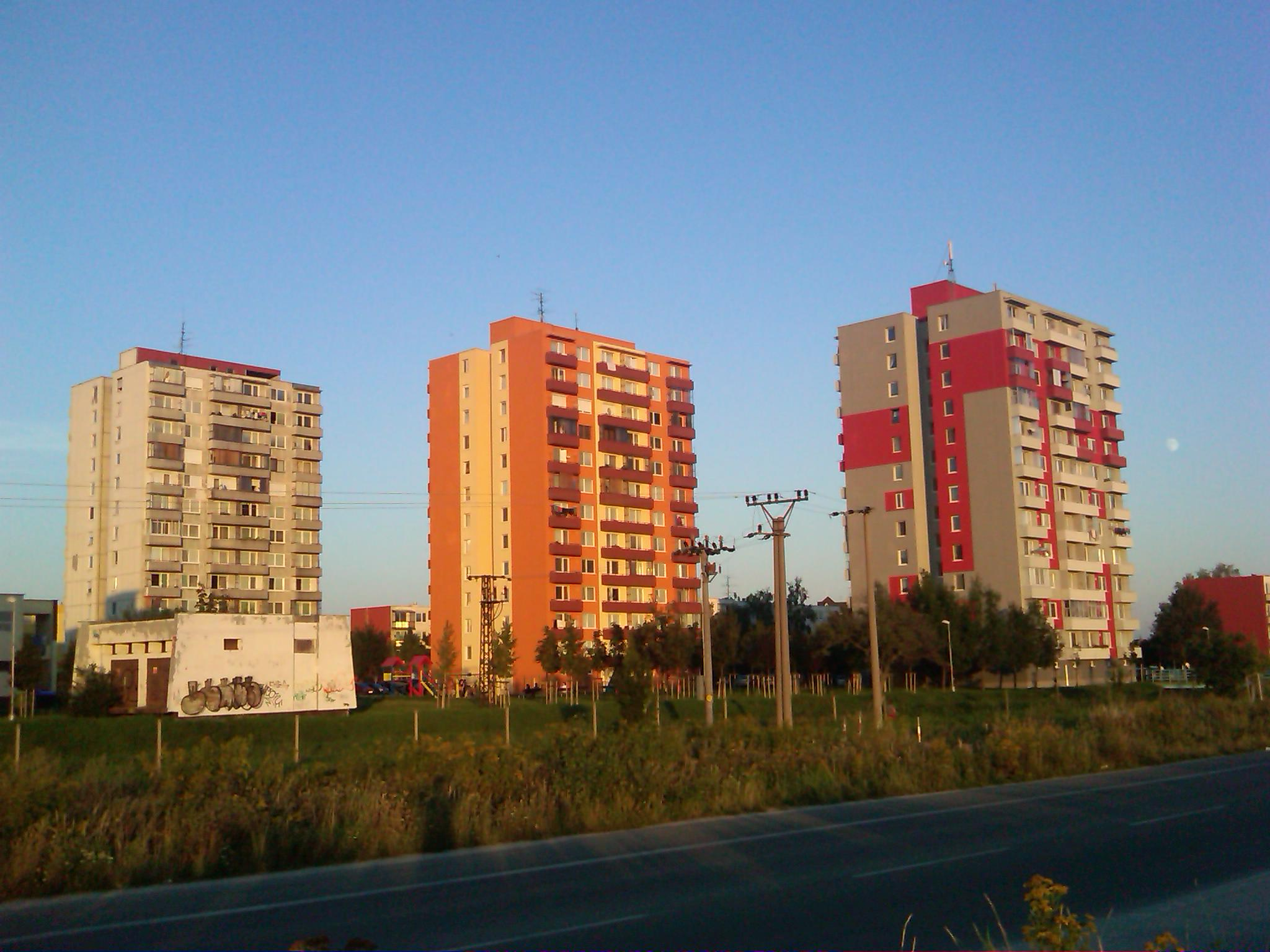
View of southern part dominants of Sídlisko Juh from Sahara in 2010

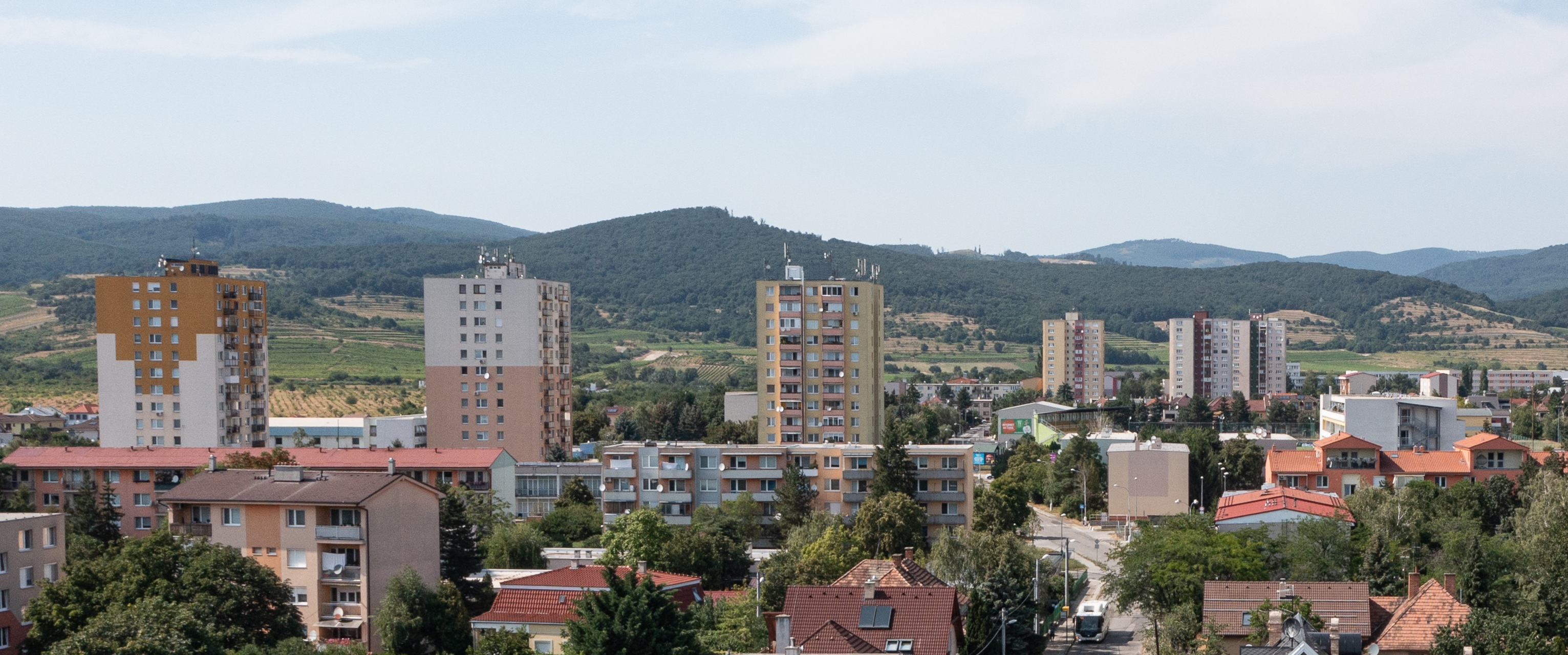
The northern and northwestern part of Sídlisko Juh with Sídlisko Starý dvor in the background

== See also ==
- Bratislavská Street (Pezinok)
