= SP-18 Onça =

General information
- Type: Experimental aircraft
- National origin: Brazil
- Manufacturer: Instituto de Pesquisas Tecnologicas
- Designer: Romeu Corsini
- Number built: 1

History
- First flight: 1965

The SP-18 Onça (Brazilian-Portuguese name for the Jaguar) also known as the IPAI-27 Jipe Voador, was a Brazilian single-seat, single engined experimental agricultural aircraft.

== Design and development ==
Developed by Brazilian engineer Romeu Corsini, it was designed to be an aircraft used in agriculture. It had STOL aircraft capabilities.

The fuselage was made of welded steel tubes, externally covered in canvas, fixed landing gear, a "T" rudder to facilitate low-speed maneuvers, wooden, high-support wing.

Flight testing went on for nearly a decade, and brought a number of improvements to the aircraft. The aircraft was eventually used for studies by aeronautical engineering students from São Carlos, under Corsini's supervision. It ended up influencing the construction of another aircraft, the IPAI-26 Tuca.

== Specifications ==
Data from Taylor 1986, p. 20, Pereira 1986, p. 217

General characteristics

- Crew: 1
- Length: 7.50 m (24 ft 7 in)
- Wingspan: 12 m (39 ft 4 in)
- Height: 2.50 m (8 ft 2 in)
- Wing area: 18 m^{2} (190 sq ft)
- Gross weight: 900 kg (1,984 lb)
- Powerplant: 1 × Franklin O-300 , 123 kW (165 hp)
- Propellers: 2-bladed

Performance

- Stall speed: 68.5 km/h (42.6 mph, 37.0 kn)
- Wing loading: 50 kg/m^{2} (10 lb/sq ft)
