= Hochschule =

German term for "higher schooling"

Hochschule (German: [ˈhoːxˌʃuːlə], plural: Hochschulen) is the generic term in German for institutions of higher education, corresponding to universities and colleges in English. The term Universität (plural: Universitäten) is reserved for institutions with the right to confer doctorates. In contrast, Hochschule encompasses Universitäten as well as institutions that are not authorized to confer doctorates.

Roughly equivalent terms to Hochschule are used in some other European countries, such as högskola in Sweden and korkeakoulu Finland (see ammattikorkeakoulu), hogeschool in the Netherlands and Flanders, and főiskola (literally "main school") in Hungary, as well as in post-Soviet countries (deriving from высшее учебное заведение) in Central Europe, in Bulgaria (висше училище) and Romania.

== Generic term ==
The German education system knows two different types of universities, which do not have the same legal status. The term Hochschule can be used to refer to all institutions of higher education in Germany that confer academic degrees, that is both regular universities (Universitäten) and Fachhochschulen.

== Specialised term ==
Rather than as an umbrella term, Hochschule is also increasingly used as a specialized term, i.e. for institutions that:

- do not cover a large diversity of academic fields, but focus on certain areas;
- do not have the right to award doctorates, but bachelor's degrees and master's degrees.

Institutions that are called Hochschule meet one or more of these criteria, which differentiate them from an Universität. In recent years, a number of German Fachhochschulen opted to name themselves Hochschule or Hochschule für angewandte Wissenschaften (university of applied sciences) rather than Fachhochschule. Additionally, there are specialized Hochschulen which focus on a particular set of disciplines, e.g., Kunsthochschulen (art schools), and share the same legal status as regular universities.

In most German states, a Berufsakademie is not a Hochschule by either of the definitions because the bachelor's degrees conferred by such are professional degrees, which are de jure not academic degrees. However the state of Baden-Württemberg, from where this type of tertiary sector education originally emerged, has recently elevated these institutions to the status of a Hochschule as Baden-Württemberg Cooperative State University. The degrees awarded by the latter are academic degrees and equivalent to those awarded by Fachhochschulen and regular universities.

== See also ==
- a Volkshochschule, despite its name, is not a Hochschule as described here
