= Ravensburg University of Cooperative Education =

Public university in Baden-Württemberg, Germany

Coordinates: 47.7798°N 9.61343°E

- Duale Hochschule Baden-Württemberg Ravensburg
- Type: Public undergraduate college of cooperative education
- Established: 1978
- President: Herbert Dreher
- Students: ca. 3500 (2012/2013)
- Location: Ravensburg, Baden-Württemberg, Germany
- Website: http://www.dhbw-ravensburg.de

Ravensburg University of Cooperative Education is a public university with campuses in Ravensburg, Stuttgart and Friedrichshafen, Germany. It offers vocational studies in the fields of business sciences, engineering and media design. The school works with more than 1100 partner companies to provide students with simultaneous job contracts and formal education. Furthermore, they offer Masters programs since October 2011, e.g. Master in Business Management. It is part of the Baden-Württemberg Cooperative State University System.
