= Bratislavská Street (Pezinok) =

Street in Pezinok, Slovakia

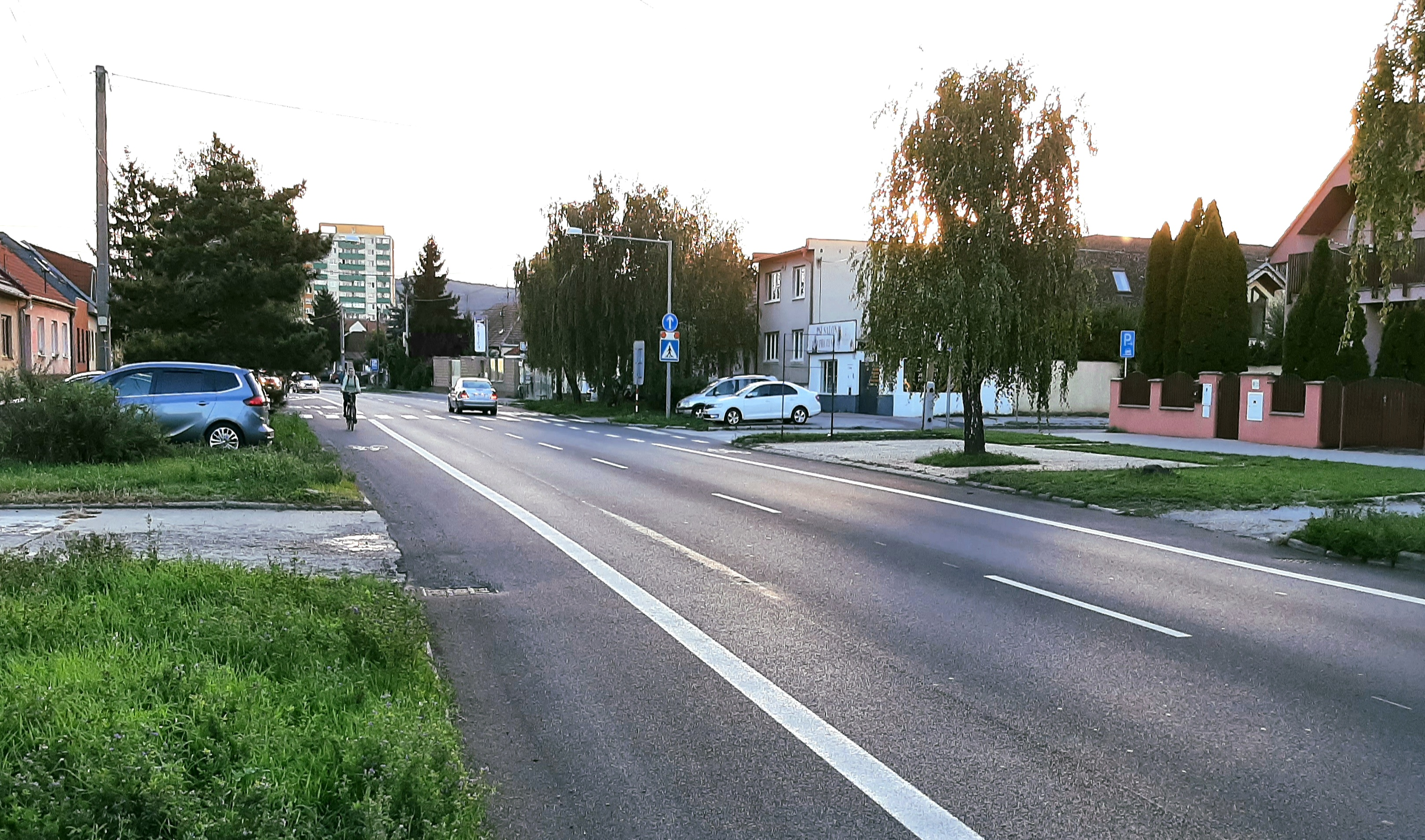
- Bratislavská Street towards Bratislava in 2024
- Interactive map of Bratislavská Street
- Native name: Bratislavská ulica (Slovak)
- Former names: Új utcza; Nová ulica; Sväto-Jurská ulica; Svätojurská ulica
- Part of: Road II/502
- Type: main street
- Maintained by: Bratislava Region (roadway); Pezinok (footpaths)
- Length: 950 m
- Location: Pezinok, Slovakia
- Postal code: 902 01
- Coordinates: 48.281495°N 17.261361°E

Construction
- Inauguration: 18th century (first mention)

Bratislavská Street (Slovak pronunciation: ['braɟislauskaː 'ulitsa], literally "Bratislava Street", Slovak: Bratislavská ulica), formerly Nová ulica ("New Street", Hungarian: Új utcza), Sväto-Jurská or Svätojurská ulica ("Sväto-Jurská" or "Svätojurská Street"), is one of main streets in Pezinok, Slovakia and part of the road II/502. It is named after Bratislava.

== Places of interest ==
In front of the house n. 60, which is located next to one of street bus stops, there is a small column shrine (Slovak: božie muky). Since 2010, a Soviet tank T-72 has been exhibited in the Murat company area at n. 87.

== Transport ==
Bratislavská Street has two bus stops:

- "Fándlyho" (formerly panelová škola)
- "Sídlisko Juh" (formerly TESCO)

They are currently served by:

- Arriva Bratislava and its regional lines n. 506, 520, 521, 526, 527, 528, 540, 550, and 565
- public transport (MHD or MAD) in Pezinok and its urban lines n. 4, 44, 5, and 55

== Reconstructions ==
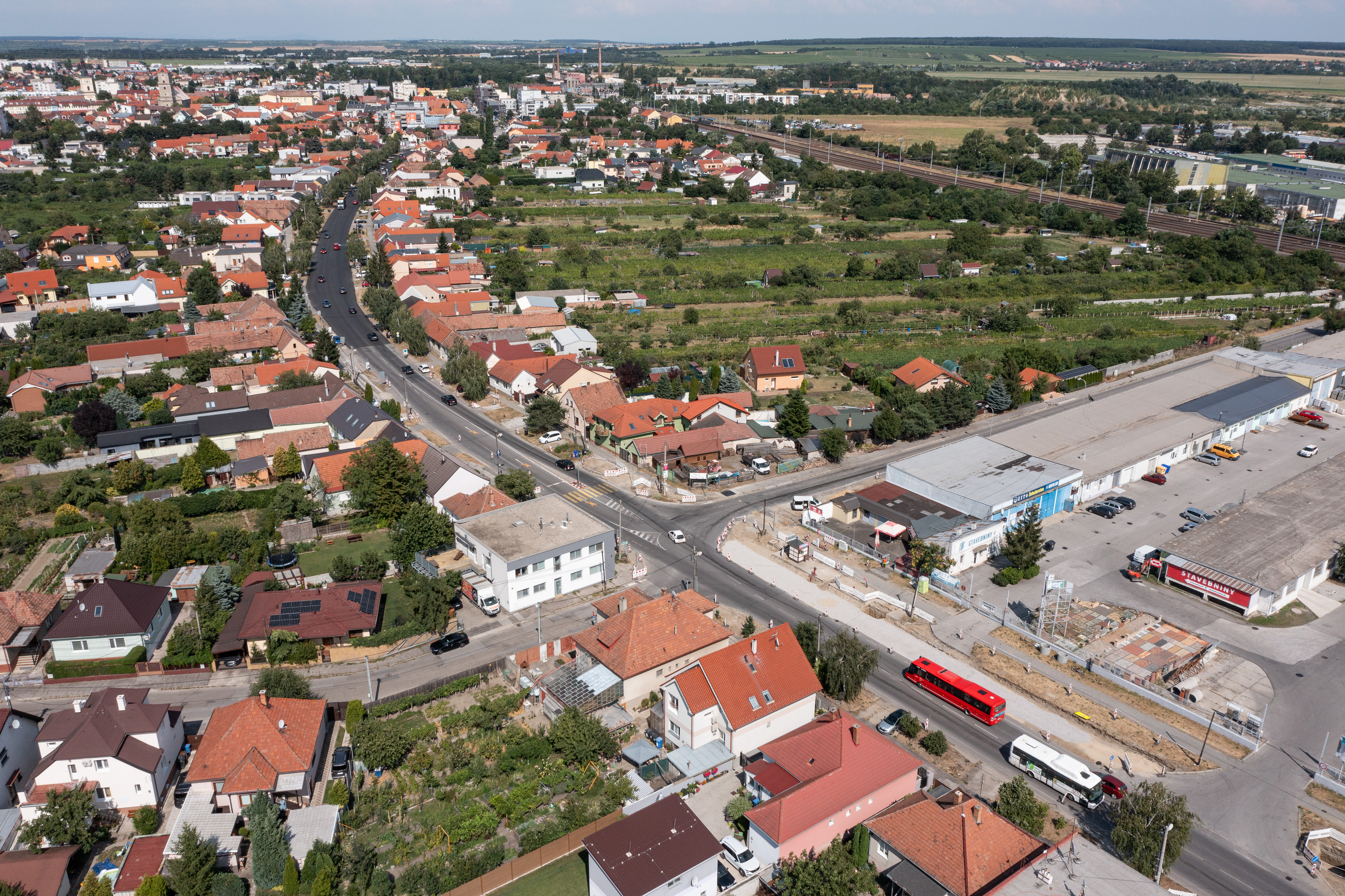
Reconstruction of II/502 roadway and new Bratislavská–Drevárska–Komenského traffic light intersection construction in July 2024

In autumn 2018, the footpath from Bernolákova to Fándlyho Street was reconstructed. During November 2022, the roadway of the street from the Bratislavská–Drevárska–Komenského intersection to the bridge was reconstructed and created a temporary light intersection. In early June 2024, the road on the bridge was reconstructed as part of the 1st stage and from family houses no. 61 and 70 to Jesenského Street as part of the 2nd stage within the road II/502 reconstruction by Bratislava Self-Governing Region (Slovak: Bratislavský samosprávny kraj). Since early July to October, a new traffic light intersection Bratislavská–Drevárska–Komenského was built as part of the 5th stage, including construction of new road edges, construction of drains, transshipment of networks, asphalting from houses no. 61 and 70 up to house no. 100 and realization of the intersection island.

== Events ==
In September 2003, a papal motorcade with Pope John Paul II passed through the street.

== Nearby streets ==
- Bernolákova Street
- Jesenského Street
- Za koničkom
- Fándlyho Street
- Nerudova Street
- Komenského Street
- Drevárska Street
- Myslenická Street
- Okružná Street

== Gallery ==
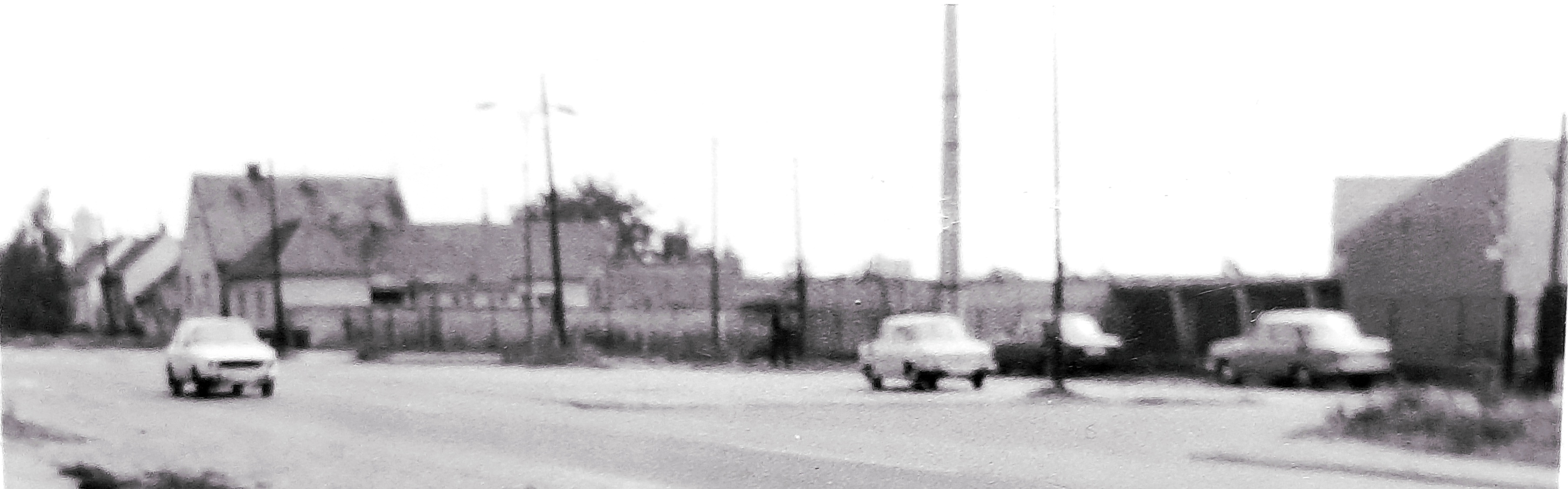
Bratislavská Street towards the town centre in the early 1980s

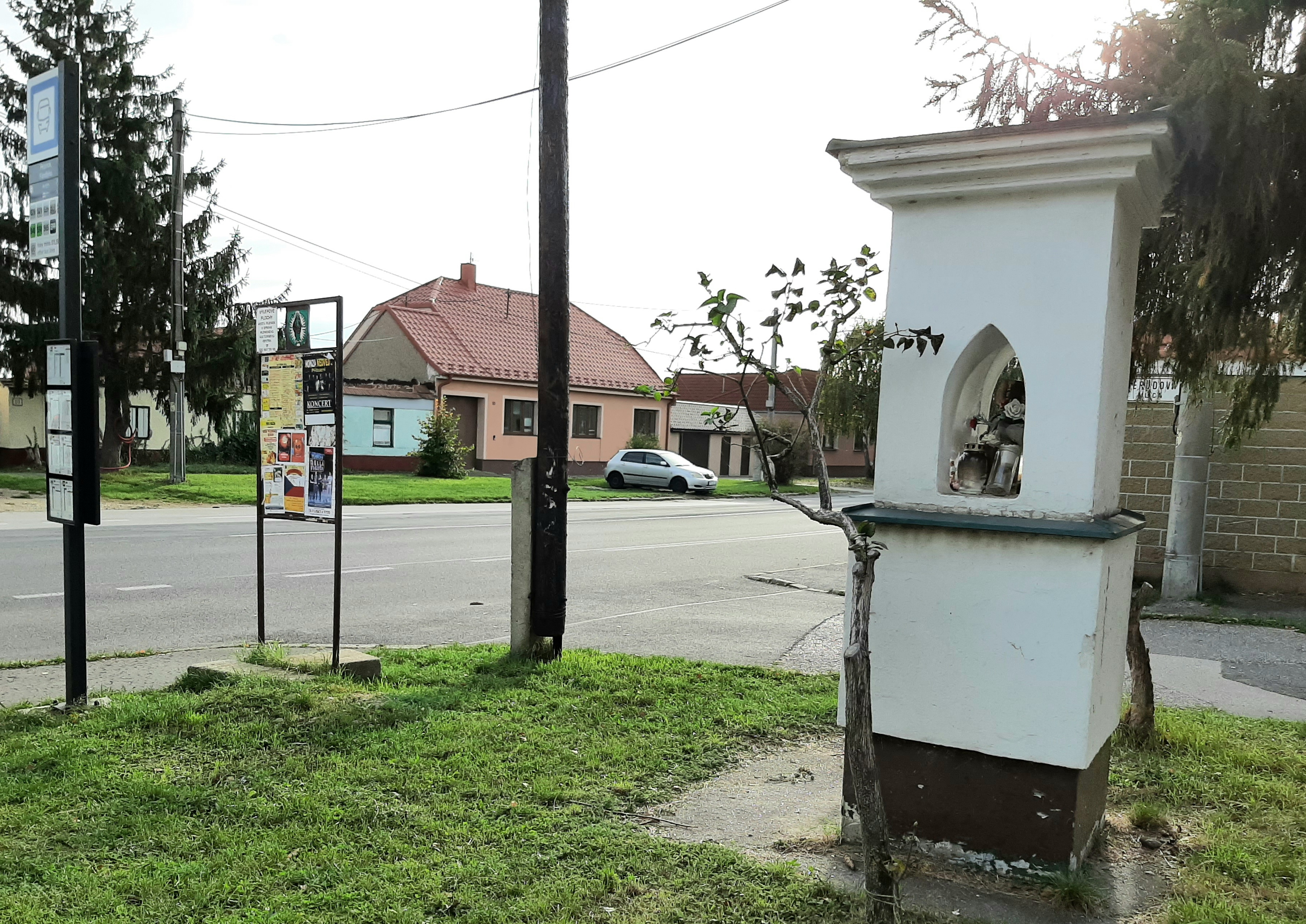
The column shrine (Slovak: božie muky) near the "Fándlyho" bus stop

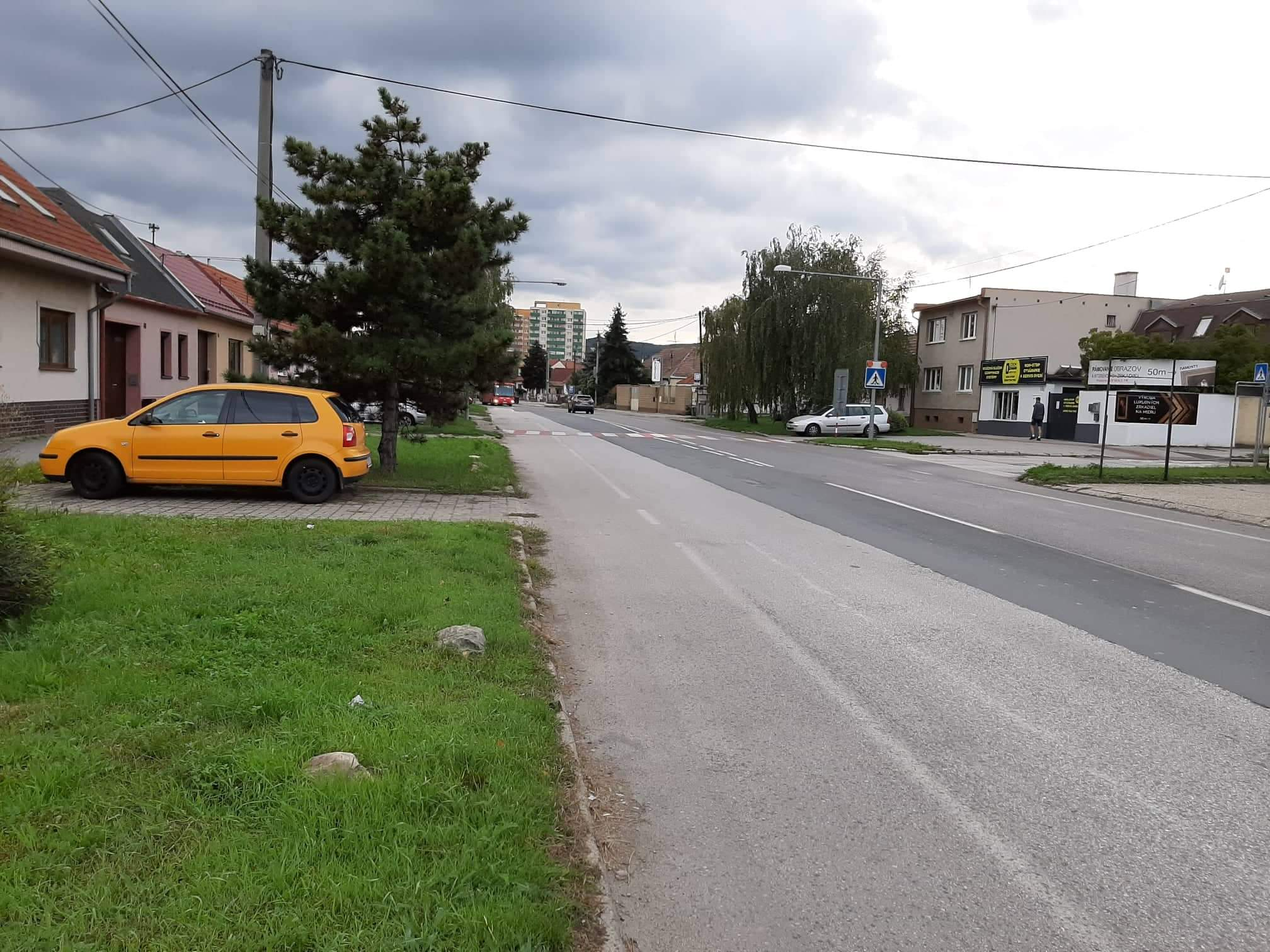
Bratislavská Street towards Bratislava in 2022
