= DHBW Mosbach =

Coordinates: 49.354158°N 9.15130546°E

Cooperative State University Mosbach
- Duale Hochschule Baden Württemberg
- Former name: Berufsakademie Mosbach
- Established: 1980
- Principal: Dirk Saller
- Students: 3286
- Location: Mosbach, Heilbronn and Bad Mergentheim, Baden-Württemberg, Germany
- Website: https://www.dhbw-mosbach.de/

The DHBW Mosbach (Baden-Württemberg Cooperative State University Mosbach) is a public institution of higher education in Germany that is part of the Duale Hochschule Baden-Württemberg (DHBW), a network of cooperative colleges in which students alternate periods of academic study with periods of paid professional employment related to their major. Its main campus is in Mosbach and it also maintains locations in Bad Mergentheim and Heilbronn. It was founded in 1980 as Berufsakademie Mosbach and became a member of the newly created DHBW in 2009. It has about 3000 students.

== Dual System ==
A specific characteristic of the cooperative colleges is the tight integration of academic instruction and practical training. Students spend about half of their program at the college and the other half in a private company (such as a technology business or bank) or public institution. Theoretical training at the college and practical work at the company alternate in 3-month blocks. The companies select the students and offer them a salaried contract. At the end of the three-year program, students receive a Bachelor's degree; some also pursue Master's degrees.

== Courses ==
DHBW Mosbach offers the following majors at undergraduate level:

At the School of Technology:

- Angewandte Informatik - applied computer science
- Bauwesen-Fassadentechnik - construction engineering: facade engineering
- Bauwesen-Projektmanagement - construction engineering: project management
- Elektrotechnik - electrical engineering
  - Maschinenbau - mechanical engineering
  - Maschinenbau-Holztechnik - mechanical engineering: wood technology
  - Maschinenbau-Kunststofftechnik - mechanical engineering: plastics technology
  - Maschinenbau-Verfahrenstechnik - mechanical engineering: process engineering
  - Maschinenbau-Virtual Engineering - mechanical engineering: virtual engineering
- Mechatronik - mechatronics
  - Mechatronik-Elektromobilität - mechatronics: electromobility
- Wirtschaftsingenieurwesen - industrial engineering
  - Wirtschaftsingenieurwesen-Innovationsmanagement und Produktmanagement - industrial engineering: innovation and product management
  - Wirtschaftsingenieurwesen-Internationale Produktion und Logistik - industrial engineering: international logistics and supply chains
  - Wirtschaftsingenieurwesen-Internationales Technisches Projektmanagement - industrial engineering: international industrial project management
  - Wirtschaftsingenieurwesen-Internationales Technisches Vertriebsmanagement - industrial engineering: international industrial sales management

At the School of Business:

- Bank - banking studies
- BWL-Gesundheitsmanagement - healthcare business management
- BWL-Handel - trade studies
  - BWL-Handel-Agrar - agricultural business
  - BWL-Handel-Bau, Haustechnik, Elektro - construction and installation business
  - BWL-Handel-Holz - timber business
  - BWL-Handel-Wohnen - homes business
  - BWL-Handel-Technischer Handel - wholesale trade
  - BWL-Handel-Controlling - controlling
  - BWL-Handel-Marketing - marketing
  - BWL-Handel-Warenwirtschaft und Logistik - supply chain management and logistics
- BWL-Industrie - manufacturing business studies
- BWL-International Business - international business
- Onlinemedien - online media studies
- Rechnungswesen Steuern Wirtschaftsrecht - accounting, tax and business law
- Wirtschaftsinformatik - business information technology
