= Mother Teresa Catholic Secondary School =

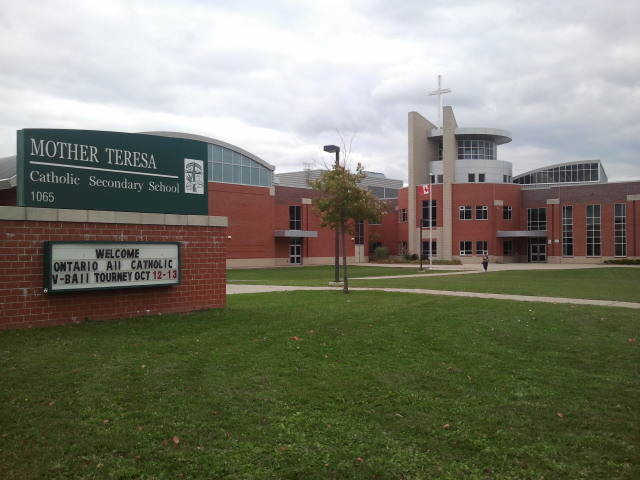

Location
- 1065 Sunningdale Road East; London, Ontario, N5X 4B1; Canada; 43.0483°N 81.2519°W

Information
- Type: Secondary school
- Motto: Latin: Carpe Diem
- Religious affiliation: Roman Catholic
- Established: 2000
- School district: London District Catholic School Board
- Principal: Principal
- Staff: 67
- Grades: 9–12
- Gender: Co-educational
- Enrollment: ~2100 (September 2025)
- Colours: Green and white black
- Mascot: Spartan
- Team name: Spartans
- Website: mts.ldcsb.ca

Mother Teresa Catholic Secondary School is a Roman Catholic co-educational secondary school in London, Ontario, Canada. It was established in 2000 and is the largest secondary school in the London District Catholic School Board. Mother Teresa Catholic Secondary School also commonly known as MTS, is a school requiring uniforms. Its school routine consists of five periods, lasting 75 minutes each (excluding lunch; 45 minutes). MTS offers a wide variety of courses to attend, including five difference technology courses, and a hockey program. MTS offers a variety of music and arts programs. Notable music programs include concert band, percussion, jazz, and online music making.

== Notable Alumni ==
- Alysha Newman Canadian Olympic pole vaulter
- Jovan Ivanisevic Canadian Soccer Player

== See also ==
- Education in Ontario
- List of secondary schools in Ontario
