= Dual-sector education =

Tertiary education system with vocational and higher components

Dual-sector education is a system of tertiary education that includes substantial amounts of both vocational (skills-based) and higher (academic-based) education in the same institution.

It differs from, and/or can also encompass, the similarly termed dual education system – which combines both vocational education within a school and an apprenticeship within a workplace. For instance, Australia's Centralian College offers dual-sector education to students in years 11 and 12 as well as post-school vocational education and training students.

Moodie distinguishes between single-sector institutions which offer 97 per cent of their teaching in one sector, mixed sector institutions which teach from 3 to 20 per cent of their students in their smaller sector, and dual-sector institutions which have substantial (greater than 20 per cent of their load) in each of vocational and higher education. For some institutions, dual-sector education, could include practical traineeship such as educational internship, field experience, and a pre-graduation internship.

Dual-sector education is offered in the so-called dual-sector institutions, which define it as "further" (post-school, but not necessarily higher level) as well as "higher" education. In Australia, these institutions note markedly different proportions of domestic students to bachelor programmes on the basis of previous studies in vocational education and training. Dual-sector education is offered by colleges and universities worldwide, mostly in Australia, Austria, Germany, Ireland, New Zealand, Switzerland, and the United Kingdom.

In the United States, the concept of dual-sector education is unheard of and unknown, especially at the higher levels of tertiary education (i.e., four-year universities awarding bachelor's degrees, master's degrees, and doctorates). Many two-year community colleges offer vocational education programs leading to certificates or associate's degrees, but the traditional American position is that research universities and vocational education are inherently incompatible and cannot function as part of the same educational institution. For example, under its prior identity as a state normal school and then a state college, the University of California, Santa Barbara historically offered one of the finest industrial arts programs in the United States. It was forced to dismantle that program upon its conversion to a research university, because certain members of the Regents of the University of California regarded "shop work" as an "insult to the university".

In Canada, Thompson Rivers University describes itself as a dual sector research university which combines academic education with applied, skills-based learning within a single institution.
