= Baden-Württemberg Cooperative State University =

Higher education institution in Germany

- Duale Hochschule Baden-Württemberg
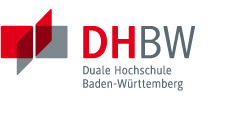
- Type: Hochschule (public)
- Established: March 1, 2009 (Berufsakademie: 1974)
- Chancellor: Dr. Wolf Dieter Heinbach
- President: Prof. Dr. Martina Klärle
- Academic staff: 650 Professors (2011/2012)
- Students: 34,000 (2015/2016)
- Location: Stuttgart, Baden-Württemberg, Germany
- Campus: Urban and rural (9 locations and 3 satellite campuses)
- Website: dhbw.de

The Baden-Württemberg Cooperative State University (German: Duale Hochschule Baden-Württemberg, DHBW) is an institution of higher education with several campuses throughout the state of Baden-Württemberg, Germany. It offers dual-education (or also cooperative education) bachelor's-degree programs in cooperation with industry and non-profit institutions in the areas of business administration, engineering, and social services. In 2011, it started a limited master's program.

== History ==
The DHBW is the direct successor to the Staatliche Berufsakademie Baden-Württemberg. The first Berufsakademie was founded in 1974 as a new type of educational institution and recognized by the state of Baden-Württemberg in 1982. It grew quickly to include seven institutions at eleven different locations. By 2009 the combined student enrolment across all institutions had reached 23,409 students, involving around 8,000 cooperative education partners and over 90,000 graduated alumni. On March 1, 2009, all institutions in the state of Baden-Württemberg were consolidated to form the Duale Hochschule Baden-Württemberg.

== Mission ==
The institution's core mission is to provide application-oriented education that aligns theoretical instruction with practical professional requirements. Key elements of this mission include the structured cooperation between the university and its partner organizations, the promotion of international exchange, and the support of diversity and equal opportunity within the academic environment. The university's mission encompasses the following key principles:

- Integration of Theory and Practice: Combining academic instruction with practical training phases in partner organizations.
- Collaborative Partnerships: Working closely with corporate and social institutions to co-develop and continuously improve educational programs.
- Internationalization: Promoting global cooperation through exchange programs and international collaborations.
- Commitment to Diversity and Equal Opportunity: Fostering an inclusive environment that values diversity and provides equal opportunities for all members.

The university aims to ensure that its graduates are equipped with both academic qualifications and relevant work experience in their respective fields.

== Dual studies ==
DHBW offers job integrated learning (JIL) programs only. Job integrated learning (JIL) defines those work integrated learning (WIL) programs with compulsory internships, in which the student has to be employed by a single company during the complete duration of the study program and in which lectures and internships are geared to maximize applied learning and the transfer of knowledge. Therefore, the recruitment is exclusively done by the cooperative education partners, while the DHBW only has to verify the higher education entrance qualification. The three-year dual education program is divided into three-month phases alternating between the college and the cooperative education partner. The college phases provide traditional undergraduate education while the other phases provide insight and work experience in the field of the cooperative education partner. The dual education program operates on a non-stop, twelve-month schedule. Students are granted vacation days as stipulated in the three-year employment contract signed by the student and the cooperative education partner at the beginning of the program.

In 2011 the school introduced a Master's curriculum. It is mostly limited to DHBW alumni.

Currently the DHBW offers 21 courses of study with about 90 branches from the sections economic science, technics and social science.

Partner companies in the field of information technology are, e.g., SAP, Hewlett Packard Enterprise, IBM, Atos and Accenture. Examples in engineering are Airbus, Siemens, Bosch, Freudenberg and Ziehl-Abegg.

== Campuses and satellite campuses ==
Campus	Founded	Staff	Enrollment
DHBW Heidenheim	1976	102	2380
DHBW Heilbronn	2014	>50	>1000
DHBW Karlsruhe	1979	111	2376
DHBW Lörrach	1981	100	1706
DHBW Mannheim	1974	190	5476
DHBW Mosbach	1980	110	2307
DHBW Mosbach Campus Bad Mergentheim	2002	29	403
DHBW Ravensburg	1978	94	1935
DHBW Ravensburg Campus Friedrichshafen	2004	34	762
DHBW Stuttgart	1974	244	5803
DHBW Stuttgart Campus Horb	1989	42	783
DHBW Villingen-Schwenningen	1975	110	1989

== International ==
The Baden-Württemberg Cooperative State University (Duale Hochschule Baden-Württemberg, DHBW) engages in international academic cooperation through institutional partnerships, mobility programs, and participation in European and global networks. The university is a participant in the Erasmus+ programme and maintains bilateral agreements with institutions in Europe, North America, Asia, and other regions.

Several campuses offer structured exchange programs, including English-language modules and semesters for incoming students. These programs are designed to align with the dual study model and are integrated into the academic calendar of the respective locations.

DHBW is a member of the EU4DUAL alliance, a consortium of European institutions focusing on dual education formats. Administrative and advisory services for international students and staff are coordinated through the university's Central International Office and local international offices at individual campuses.

== Student clubs ==
The Baden-Württemberg Cooperative State University (DHBW) offers a wide variety of student organizations, including several formula student teams and other various projects.

=== DHBW Ravensburg ===
The Ravensburg campus is home to the Formula Student team Global Formula Racing as well as the student-led aerospace initiative SeeSat.

Global Formula Racing (GFR) is an international collaboration established in 2009 by the teams of DHBW Ravensburg in Germany and Oregon State University (OSU) in the United States. Students from both universities work together to design, manufacture, and compete with cars in Formula SAE and Formula Student competitions. The team has won multiple championship titles in these competitions.

SeeSat focuses on the design and construction of a miniature satellite (CubeSat). Their ongoing ERWIN (Emission of Radiation based Wildfire INvestigation) project is designed to identify and track forest fires from space.
