= Innovation Park Artificial Intelligence =

Research and development campus in Heilbronn, Baden-Württemberg

- Abbreviation: IPAI
- Founded: 27 July 2021
- Founders: Dieter Schwarz Foundation; Schwarz Group; City of Heilbronn
- Type: Innovation platform
- Headquarters: Heilbronn, Baden-Württemberg, Germany
- Coordinates: 49.181°N 9.192°E
- Region served: Europe
- CEO: Moritz Gräter
- Parent organization: IPAI Management GmbH
- Website: ip.ai/en/

The Innovation Park Artificial Intelligence (IPAI) is an innovation platform and planned research and development campus in Heilbronn, Baden-Württemberg, Germany, focused on artificial intelligence (AI). It brings together actors from business, science and the public sector to develop and test applications of AI. The project originated in the state’s competition to host an “AI Innovation Park” and has been supported by the Dieter Schwarz Foundation, the Schwarz Group and the City of Heilbronn. The CEO of IPAI is Moritz Gräter.

== History ==
IPAI SPACES (2026)

In 2021 the State of Baden-Württemberg selected Heilbronn as the location for its AI innovation park following a state-wide call for proposals. IPAI is operated by IPAI Management GmbH. The Dieter Schwarz Foundation describes IPAI as covering the AI value chain from skills and research to application and commercialization, with a particular emphasis on the responsible use of AI.

An interim site, IPAI SPACES, opened as a visitor and co-working venue to support activities ahead of the permanent campus.

== Campus ==
The permanent IPAI Campus is planned on roughly 30 hectares in the Steinäcker area of Heilbronn. Construction of the IPAI began with a groundbreaking ceremony on 21 October 2025, attended by Federal Chancellor Friedrich Merz. Initial buildings are expected to be ready for occupancy by the end of 2027.

The winning masterplan was designed by the Dutch architectural firm MVRDV, featuring a recognizable circular layout intended to facilitate collaboration and testing in “living labs”. The City of Heilbronn describes IPAI as developing one of Europe’s largest AI ecosystems on site.

== Activities and partners ==
IPAI presents itself as a platform for applied AI and co-creation, aiming to accelerate organizational AI adoption and to convene companies, research institutions and public-sector actors. Organizations partnering with or participating in the platform include firms from manufacturing, mobility, IT and services. For example, Deutsche Telekom announced it would join the IPAI innovation platform in May 2025. Media and government profiles have described Heilbronn’s IPAI as part of an emerging AI ecosystem in the region.

A non-profit IPAI Foundation was established in Heilbronn to facilitate dialogue on social, ethical and legal aspects of human-centred AI and to complement the platform’s activities.

== See also ==
- List of research parks
