= IPAI-26 Tuca =

Brazilian aircraft

General information
- Type: Light aircraft
- National origin: Brazil
- Manufacturer: Instituto de Pesquisas e Aperfeiçoamento Industrial
- Designer: D. Lucato
- Number built: 1

History
- First flight: 1979

The IPAI-26 Tuca was a Brazilian single engined high-wing light utility aircraft.

== Design and development ==
The project was born by engineer D. Lucato, who had just finished his degree in aeronautical engineering at the Federal University of São Carlos, a simple and economical two-seater airplane capable of landing at airports with limited infrastructure.

The aircraft was designed as a shoulder-wing monoplane with conventional T-tail and rigid nose wheel landing gear. The fuselage was made of welded steel tubes and was clad with composite materials, while the braced wings were made of wood. The cabin, which was entered through side doors, had three seats, with the third seat removable to load cargo. The aircraft was powered by a Lycoming O-235-C-1 4-stroke boxer engine producing 80 kW.

== Variant ==
IPAI-3
Designation of the planned production version, whose newly developed wings would have had a supercritical airfoil and integrated flaps.

== Specifications ==
Data from Pereira 1986, p. 298, Taylor 1981, p. 20

General characteristics

- Crew: 1
- Capacity: 2
- Length: 6.82 m (22 ft 5 in)
- Wingspan: 11 m (36 ft 1 in)
- Height: 2.50 m (8 ft 2 in)
- Wing area: 16.99 m^{2} (182.9 sq ft)
- Airfoil: NACA 23012
- Max takeoff weight: 700 kg (1,543 lb)
- Powerplant: 1 × Lycoming O-235-C1 4-stroke boxer engine, 81 kW (108 hp)
- Propellers: 2-bladed

Performance

- Maximum speed: 190 km/h (120 mph, 100 kn)
- Cruise speed: 185 km/h (115 mph, 100 kn)
- Stall speed: 76 km/h (47 mph, 41 kn)
- Endurance: 1 h 30 m
- Service ceiling: 3,660 m (12,010 ft)
