= Cooperative education =

Type of education

Cooperative education (or co-operative education) is a structured method of combining classroom-based education with practical work experience, especially in higher education. A cooperative education experience, commonly known as a "co-op" or work-study program, provides academic credit for structured work experiences, helping young people in school-to-work transition.

It falls under the umbrella of work-integrated learning (alongside internships, service learning, and clinical placements) but is distinct, as it alternates a school term with a work term, reflecting a partnership between the academic institution and the employer, intended to advance the education of the student.

Co-op jobs are typically more in-depth and last a longer period than a traditional internship, making it more valuable to students in the workforce. They allow for more networking opportunities, better income, stronger resume, and an overall unique learning experience.

The University of Waterloo operates the largest post-secondary co-op program in the world, with nearly 20,000 co-op students enrolled over three semesters in more than 120 programs.

== Schneider's Foundations ==
While at Lehigh University at the beginning of the 20th century, Herman Schneider (1872–1939), an engineer, architect, and educator, concluded that the traditional learning space or classroom was insufficient for technical students (Smollins 1999). Schneider observed that several more successful Lehigh graduates had worked to earn money before graduation. Gathering data through interviews with employers and graduates, he devised the framework for cooperative education (1901). About that time, Carnegie Technical Schools, now Carnegie Mellon University, opened and thereby minimized the need for Schneider's co-op plan in the region around Lehigh University. However, in 1903 the University of Cincinnati appointed Schneider to their faculty. In 1905 the UC Board of Trustees allowed Schneider to "try this cooperative idea of education for one year only, for the failure of which they would not be held responsible". The cooperative education program was launched in 1906, and became an immediate success, and the program was kept beyond the one-year allotted. The University of Cincinnati returned to the matter in its September 2005 board meeting, declaring the 100-year trial period of one hundred years of Cooperative Education officially ended, for the success of which the Board resumed full responsibility.

Schneider, beginning from the rank of assistant professor, would rise through the rank of Dean of Engineering (1906–1928) to become interim president (1929–32) of the University of Cincinnati, based largely upon the strength of the co-op program. Throughout his career, he was an advocate for the co-op framework. His thirty years of service to the University of Cincinnati are partly credited for that institution's worldwide fame. In 2006, the University of Cincinnati unveiled a statue of Dean Schneider outside the window of his former office in Baldwin Hall.

In 1965, The Cooperative Education and Internship Association (CEIA) created "The Dean Herman Schneider Award" in honor of the contributions made by Dean Schneider to cooperative education. The award is given annually to an outstanding educator from the faculty or administration. In 2006, the University of Cincinnati established the Cooperative Education Hall of Honor "to give a permanent place of honor to individuals and organizations that have made a significant qualitative difference in the advancement of Cooperative Education for the benefit of students."

== Post-Cincinnati Evolutions ==
In 1909, recognizing the potential of co-op education, Northeastern University began implementing co-op in their engineering program, becoming the second institution in America to do so. By 1921, Antioch College had adapted co-op practices to their liberal arts curricula, leading many to refer to co-op as the "Antioch Plan." In 1919, the General Motors Institute (GMI) was opened, following this model to train new General Motors hires. This school was later renamed Kettering University.

The Drexel University four-year co-op program launched in the College of Engineering in 1919, with the participation of just three academic majors. This initiative stemmed from the belief of the university founder, Anthony J. Drexel, that Drexel University should prepare its students for successful careers through an education that balanced classroom theory with real-world practice. In 1925, the five-year co-op program took hold in the chemical engineering department, forming the foundation of Drexel's cooperative education program. Today, the cooperative education program supports students in more than 75 different disciplines, making it one of the largest programs in the US.

In 1922, Northeastern University emphasized its commitment to co-op by extending it to the College of Business Administration. As new colleges opened at Northeastern, such as the College of Liberal Arts (1935) and the College of Education (1953), they became co-op schools as well. By the 1980s, Northeastern was the acknowledged leader in co-op education worldwide.(Smollins 1999)

In 1926, Dean Schneider invited those interested in forming an Association of Co-operative Colleges (ACC) to the University of Cincinnati for the first convention. The idea took hold and was followed by three more annual conventions. In 1929, the Society for the Promotion of Engineering Education, now called the American Society for Engineering Education (ASEE), formed the Division of Cooperative Engineering Education, incorporating the membership of the ACC (Auld 1972).

In 1957, the first Canadian cooperative education program began at the University of Waterloo with an inaugural class of 75. Initially viewed skeptically, this program quickly became a model for other co-op programs across Canada. These programs were based on both the sandwich education model popularized in Britain and the new American co-op programs. Canadian co-op programs generally follow a four-month school system interspersed with four-month work terms. This common system allows employers to hire students from multiple institutions with common timelines and training programs.

In 1961, the Ford and Edison Foundations commissioned a study of cooperative education, published as Work-study college programs; appraisal and report of the study of cooperative education, (James Warner Wilson and Edward H Lyons, New York: Harper). This study led to the formation of the National Commission for Cooperative Education (NCCE). NCCE remains today to promote and lobby for cooperative education in the United States. Its membership comprises sponsoring corporations and organizations (not individuals) from academia and business.

Within Canada, the need for connections between co-op programs became clear by 1973. The Canadian Association for Co-operative Education (CAFCE) began with 29 educators from 15 institutions. In its initial form, it did not include any employers or industry representatives. The institutions felt that they should decide on an integrative plan for co-op education prior to admitting employers as members. In 1977, employers, HR representatives, and recruiters began to join CAFCE.

By 1962, about 150 academic institutions used co-op education, in one form or another. Many were outside of engineering. The need for professional support of non-engineering programs became obvious, and the membership of ASEE, in 1963, began the Cooperative Education Association. To reflect its membership more accurately, it was eventually (sometime in the 1990s or early 2000s) renamed the Cooperative Education and Internship Association. It remains today as the professional association for cooperative education outside of ASEE.

Much of those early efforts of NCCE focused on lobbying and promoting cooperative education. In 1965, the federal Higher Education Act provided support specifically for cooperative education. Funding continued from the federal government through 1992 when Congress ended its support of cooperative education. In total, over $220 million was appropriated by the federal government toward cooperative education.(Carlson 1999)

In Canada, regulation of cooperative education programs is overseen by CAFCE. Programs can apply for accreditation after the first class of co-op students has graduated. To be accredited, 30% of the time spent in the program must be devoted to work experience, and each experience must last at least 12 weeks.

In 1979, educators from Australia, Britain, Canada, and the United States (Northeastern's President, Kenneth Ryder), met to discuss work-related programs in their respective countries. In 1981 and 1982, this group, headed by President Ryder, convened an international conference on cooperative education. In 1983, several college and university presidents, educational specialists, and employers from around the world (including Australia, Canada, Hong Kong, the Netherlands, the Philippines, the United States, and the United Kingdom) formed the World Council and Assembly on Cooperative Education to foster cooperative education worldwide. In 1991, it renamed itself the World Association for Cooperative Education (WACE). By 2005, that Association had a membership of over 1,000 individuals from 43 different countries.

== In Australia ==
Cooperative education is common in most Australian high schools and has been integrated into many university courses as a part of making up final grades. Australian institutions often refer to cooperative education as Work Placement, VET, or Prac. All of these involve students going into their chosen field and joining that field for a set number of weeks in unpaid work. This unpaid work goes towards credits for graduation in both schools and universities Australia-wide. The Australian government has been funding this program due to the success of highly regarded applicants who have come from doing work placements. Many companies in Australia are more inclined to hire an individual who has had proper training within their specific field than those who have not, creating many more successful applicants and jobs within Australia.

== In Germany ==
Cooperative education has helped to address social issues. In Germany, the significance of cooperative education has increased in the last few years and now has an important profile in the education system.

In 2013, the importance was underlined in a paper by the Economic Council of the CDU, including a definition of the dual study program.

The council defined two main characteristics:

- Duality: Two learning facilities must be provided: tertiary studies and vocational training. There should be duality between these facilities with agreements and cooperation in adjusting educational content and goals.
- The tertiary studies are organized by a university of cooperative education, university of applied sciences or university.

The goal is to enable dual qualification of a tertiary degree and skilled worker knowledge.

=== Delimitation to Vocational Training ===
A dual study program combines study at a higher education institution with structured workplace learning at a partner company. The tertiary education sector in Germany comprises academic and non-academic educational institutions. A dual study program at an academic institution, such as universities, universities of applied sciences and some special universities of cooperative education (e.g. DHBW), grants academic degrees (typically a Bachelor's degree). Most universities of cooperative education are German Berufsakademien, which do not grant academic degrees but award state-recognised qualifications classified as equivalent to academic degrees.

Depending on the specific program structure, dual students can also earn a recognized vocational qualification in training-integrated models.

=== University of cooperative education (Berufsakademie) ===
The first cooperative education programs, in terms of studies with integrated practical phases, started in 1970. The next step was the foundation of a new tertiary education institution, a university of cooperative education. That enabled the establishment of a cooperative study program, originally founded in Baden-Württemberg. More people had been graduating from high school with the highest school certificate: "Abitur". This had led to an increase in the number of students attending university and a decrease in the number of trainees and apprentices in vocational training. On one hand, companies were apprehensive about a lack of skilled workers. On the other hand, there was a need for more experienced workers which were not provided by vocational training, while universities could not provide skilled worker qualifications.

In 1995, the standing conference of education ministers of the 16 German states declared universities of cooperative education as equivalent to universities of applied sciences.

In 1996, the science council recommended an increased focus on cooperative education. There were 45 cooperative programs in 1995, and the number increased to 100 by the year 2000.

In 2004, the conference of education ministers declared degrees from universities of cooperative education as equivalent to a bachelor's degree from traditional universities.

Baden-Württemberg's universities of cooperative education were merged into an academic institution, the Baden-Württemberg Cooperative State University (DHBW), in 2009 and were therefore allowed to grant academic degrees. Other universities of cooperative education were also approved as state universities.

=== Academic dual study programs ===
In contrast to cooperative education programs at universities of cooperative education, an academic dual study program at a university of applied sciences, university and those transformed academic universities of cooperative education (e.g. DHBW) combines the practical experience inside a company with an academic university degree. Dual students typically alternate between attending the university and working at a partner company.

=== Perspectives ===
From 2004 to 2014, the number of students has increased from 40,982 to 100,739. There were 47,458 companies providing cooperative study programs in 2016, compared to 18,168 in 2004. Small, medium, and large companies have established programs in different departments. Large companies who annually employ many students include Aldi, Bayer, Daimler, Deutsche Bank, Henkel, Hochtief, Lufthansa, Peek & Cloppenburg, SAP, Siemens, and Volkswagen.

There are different dual curriculum programs. The number of courses grew from 512 in 2014 to 1,592 in 2016. They can be summarized in the following areas of study: 38% Engineering, 34% economic sciences, 12% computer sciences, 10% social services, education, healthcare, nursing, 6% others.

There is a contract between the student and employer (and normally also with the university) over the time of the study. Mostly, the employer provides payment which is slightly above the payment for a vocational training. Some companies also pay student fees. There are usually agreements including a guaranteed employment after the program. Therefore, some contracts include terms where students commit to stay with the company for at least two years after the program. Even without guaranteed employment, chances of getting a job are high anyway. Around 72% of students stay with the sponsoring company after studies for at least two to five years. A common issue is that many students want to do their masters afterwards. Not all companies are willing to support a master program, since they argue that the result is sometimes not worth the additional investment.

== In Canada ==
=== Governing Bodies ===
Since 1973, Canada has had a national body representing cooperative education and work integrated learning. This national body used to be called CAFCE (Canadian Association for Co-op Education) and was renamed CEWIL Canada (Cooperative Education and Work Integrated Learning Canada) in 2017. This organization has representatives from Canadian post-secondary institutions and employers who work together to develop resources to promote the highest quality of post-secondary work-integrated learning programs. CEWIL Canada works to establish national standards for WIL programs. The organization also allows for delivery of training opportunities and best practice sharing. CEWIL maintains a national database on WIL with data from more than fifty post-secondary member institutions. CEWIL reports that over 75,000 students are participating in co-operative education programs across the country. Canadian students who work in cooperative education can earn close to $20 per hour and represent a wide range of disciplines and programs, ranging from science, engineering, business, arts and technology.

=== Canadian Terminology ===
Work Integrated Learning (WIL) is the commonly accepted term for a wide range of experiential learning opportunities in Canada. Work Integrated Learning (WIL) is considered to be inclusive of educational programs that incorporate a workplace-based component that has connections to the classroom through various learning goals designated in the students' program or curriculum. It is widely accepted that WIL opportunities have value and produce benefit for students and employers, including employment readiness (such as gaining job-related skills and knowing what kind of job opportunity a student would want to have after graduation). Students participating in WIL can experience new environments, tasks, colleagues for typically a shorter period of time. Work Integrated Learning includes Cooperative Education which is typically a paid work experience of three, four, eight, twelve or sixteen months.

When surveyed by Miriam Kramer in a study in 2011, 92% of students Agreed or Strongly Agreed that their co-op work term had a positive impact on critical & analytical thinking, problem solving and decision-making skills. In Canada, another grouping of industry and education professionals came together to create The Business Higher Education Roundtable (BHER). The BHER was established by the Business Council of Canada in 2015 and works on two goals: 1. Helping young Canadians transition from higher education to workplaces through collaborative partnerships and post-secondary institutions and 2. Strengthen research and innovation partnerships between Canadian companies and post-secondary institutions. The BHER reports that about half of all Canadian university students take part in some form of WIL and 65-70% of Canadian college students takes part in WIL programs.

=== Cooperative education benefits ===
For the Canadian Post-Secondary Student, it is considered to be a benefit to add a co-operative work term to an undergraduate degree.

==== Studies at the University of Ottawa ====
Jeela Jones completed a qualitative study on students' co-operative work experience. She states that bringing theoretical concepts out of the classroom and into a related vocational workplace can produce educational benefits. She researched the concept of Connected Learning in co-operative work terms, which is a learning approach where learners gain knowledge through connecting with people and things, while feeling safe in their environments, they can develop themselves. Jones explained the results of her study emphasizing the importance of relationships with supervisors as mentors, who pushed learners beyond their comfort zones. Many students interviewed for this study commented that despite many challenges that were faced in their co-op experience, that it was a worthwhile experience that allowed them to build new skills, meet new industry connections and become increasingly motivated, self-confident and career-oriented.

==== Studies at the University of Toronto ====
A study carried out by Tsang and others examined the effects of cooperative learning in a science class teaching quantitative reasoning skills. The researchers suggest carefully designing tasks to prevent one student from overly relying on another team member. The study found that cooperative learning enables freshmen and sophomores to better apply the quantitative skills they have to new problems. Additionally, students express a preference for the cooperative setting over the individual setting.

== Co-op models ==
From its beginnings in Cincinnati in 1906, cooperative education has evolved into a program offered at the secondary and post-secondary levels in two predominant models (Grubb & Villeneuve 1995). In one model, students alternate a semester of academic coursework with an equal amount of time working, repeating this cycle several times until graduation. The parallel method splits the day between school and work, typically structured to accommodate the student's class schedule. Thus, like school-to-work (STW), the co-op model includes school-based and work-based learning and, in the best programs, "connecting activities" such as seminars and teacher-coordinator work site visits. These activities help students explicitly connect work and learning.

Other models, such as the sandwich model and the American-style semester model, instead have students work a 40-hour work week for a set amount of time, typically between 12 weeks and six months. After this period is over, students return to the classroom for an academic semester after which they may have another work term. This cycle often repeats multiple times, adding a year or more to the students' university career. In this model, students' do not receive a summer break from school but instead are either working or in school for 12 months of the year. Before or during this work experience students may complete activities designed to maximize their learning on the job, such as online workplace conduct courses or reflective activities.

Co-op's proponents identify benefits for students (including motivation, career clarity, enhanced employability, and vocational maturity) and employers (labor force flexibility, recruitment/retention of trained workers, and input into curricula) as well as educational institutions and society (ibid.). Beyond informal and anecdotal evidence, however, a familiar refrain in the literature is the lack of well-done research that empirically demonstrates these benefits (Barton 1996; Wilson, Stull & Vinsonhaler 1996). Barton (1996) identifies some of the research problems for secondary co-op as follows: federal data collection on high school co-op enrollments and completions ceased in the 1980s; some studies use data in which co-op was not isolated from other work experience programs. Ricks et al. (1993) describe other problems: due to lack of a clear or consistent definition of cooperative education, researchers cannot accurately identify variables and findings cannot be compared; theory is not well developed; theory, research, and practice are not integrated; and co-op research does not adhere to established standards.

Another set of problems involves perceptions of the field and its marginalization. Because of its "vocational" association, co-op is not regarded as academically legitimate; rather, it is viewed as taking time away from the classroom (Crow 1997). Experiential activities are necessarily rewarded in post-secondary promotion and tenure systems (except in certain extenuating situations), and co-op faculty may be isolated from other faculty (Crow 1997; Schaafsma 1996). Despite the current emphasis on contextual learning, work is not recognized as a vehicle for learning (Ricks et al. 1993). Schaafsma (1996) and Van Gyn (1996) agree that the field places too much emphasis on placements rather than learning. Wilson, Stull & Vinsonhaler (1996) also decry the focus on administration, logistics, placements, and procedures.

Some institutions are fully dedicated to the co-op ideal (such as Northeastern University, Drexel University, Georgia Institute of Technology, RIT, Kettering University, LaGuardia Community College, and Purdue University). In others, the co-op program may be viewed as an add-on and therefore is vulnerable to cost cutting (Wilson, Stull & Vinsonhaler 1996). Even where co-op programs are strong they can be threatened, as at Cincinnati Technical College when it became a comprehensive community college (Grubb & Villeneuve 1995) or LaGuardia during a budget crisis (Grubb & Badway 1998). For students, costs and time to degree completion may be deterrents to co-op participation (Grubb & Villeneuve 1995). Other deterrents may include financial barriers, aversion to moving frequently due to family obligations, or other pressures as well as difficulty managing the job search during a school semester.

== New approaches ==
Despite these problems, there is optimism about the future of co-op education; "Social, economic, and historic forces are making cooperative education more relevant than ever" (Grubb & Villeneuve 1995, p. 17), including emphasis on university-industry-government cooperation, a fluid and demanding workplace, new technology, the need for continuous on-the-job learning, globalization, and demands for accountability (John, Doherty & Nichols 1998). Federal investments in school-to-work and community service have resulted in a number of initiatives designed to provide "learning opportunities beyond the classroom walls" (Furco 1996, p. 9). Because this has always been a principle of co-op, the field is in a position to capitalize on its strengths and the ways it complements other experiential methods in the effort to provide meaningful learning opportunities for students. To do this, however, cooperative education must be redesigned.

For Wilson, Stull & Vinsonhaler (1996), a new vision involves conceiving, defining, and presenting co-op "as a curriculum model that links work and academics – a model that is based on sound learning theory" (p. 158). Ricks (1996) suggests affirming the work-based learning principles upon which co-op is based. These principles assert that cooperative education fosters self-directed learning, reflective practice, and transformative learning; and integrates school and work learning experiences that are grounded in adult learning theories.

Fleming (2013) suggests that a new practical and research focus should be on the relationship between educational institutions and employers – institutions should take more initiative when it comes to training supervisors to be effective mentors. This would maximize the success of the work term and the amount the student learns, while also increasing the quality and quantity of the students' work. Drewery and Pretti (2015) echo this as they call for greater attention on the relationship between the student and the supervisor, explaining that this relationship can greatly impact the students' satisfaction with the co-op term and the benefits they gain from it.

Schaafsma (1996) also focuses on learning, seeing a need for a paradigm shift from content learning to greater understanding of learning processes, including reflection and critical thinking. Co-op is an experiential method, but learning from experience is not automatic. Therefore, Van Gyn (1996) recommends strengthening the reflective component that is already a part of some co-op models. "If co-op is only a vehicle for experience to gain information about the workplace and to link technical knowledge with workplace application, then its effectiveness is not fully developed" (Van Gyn 1996, p. 125). A Higher Education Council of Ontario paper reviewing the University of Waterloo's PD programs states that the reflective element of the program is one of the main strengths, as it encourages students to review their own experiences and learn from their work terms. Maureen Drysdale suggests in a 2012 paper that the reflective elements of co-op allow students to increase their career and personal clarity relative to non-co-op students.

The Bergen County Academies, a public magnet high school in New Jersey, utilizes co-op education in a program called Senior Experience. This program allows all 12th grade students to participate in cooperative education or an internship opportunity for the full business day each Wednesday. Students explore a wide range of career possibilities. This new approach was recognized as an educational best practice and has been adopted as a state educational initiative for 12th grade students.

Wilfrid Laurier University offers a wide variety of Community Service Learning (CSL) courses under the umbrella of Experiential Learning programs. Community Service Learning provides academic credit for participation in a placement within a community service organization. CSL course examples include psychology, human rights and human diversity, youth and children's studies, business, kinesiology, global studies, history, health studies, and geography. Completing a CSL placement allows students to blend hands-on learning, community service and classroom learning in one experience. Many learning outcomes can be achieved through Community Service Learning. Examples of learning outcomes include: social responsibility, intellectual growth, leadership development, appreciating diversity, collaboration, career and educational goals, self-awareness and clarified values. CSL placements at Wilfrid Laurier University last approximately 10 weeks and typically involve attending a community organization for two hours/week.

== Negative implications ==
Although there are many benefits to the cooperative education programme, there are some downsides. The negative implications do not fully compromise the number of students undertaking the study, but rather how the programme will affect the government's future funding for education. A huge burden that cooperative education brings to the education institution is financial struggles. The financial struggles come from the schools and universities who put pressure on the departments of education for funding to keep the programme going.

Implications directly to the students who participate in cooperative education is mainly based on direct learning at their institution, whether it is school or university. The cooperative education programme takes students away from school or university. As a student misses a consecutive number of school days, they can start to fall behind in school work and will eventually be unable to cope with their workload. For students who attend school and also participate in the cooperative education programme, commonly called Work Placement or VET courses, they are no longer eligible to be granted direct entry into university. This then gives the student an option of TAFE entry, a university certified bridging course or go on to full-time work after completion of graduation.

== Integrating experiential methods ==
School-to-work and service learning have also been promoted as ways to link theory and practice through meaningful experiential learning experiences. Furco (1996) outlines the similarities between school-to-work and service learning. Although school-to-work, service learning, and co-op have different goals, each of his points also applies to cooperative education:

- Based on the philosophy that learners learn best through active engagement in meaningful activities
- View of students as active learners and producers of knowledge
- Use of such instructional strategies as contextual learning and application of knowledge to real situations
- Requirement for schools to establish formal partnerships with outside entities
- Concern for integrating school experiences and external experiences

The Community Service Scholarship Program at California State University-Fresno combines cooperative education with service learning. Students receive co-op/internship credit and scholarships for completing a placement at a community service site (Derousi & Sherwood 1997). As in traditional co-op work placements, students get real-world training, opportunities to explore career options, and enhanced employability skills such as communication, problem solving, and leadership as well as awareness of community and social problems. Combining co-op and service learning thus prepares students for roles as workers and citizens.

Research on highly successful co-op programs in Cincinnati (Grubb & Villeneuve 1995) and at LaGuardia Community College (Grubb & Badway 1998) shows that they share the basic philosophy and fundamental characteristics of the educational strategy of school-to-work. The reconceptualization of co-op should recognize and build upon this connection. At the same time, lessons from successful co-op programs can benefit the broader STW movement.

There is a need for broader definition of acceptable models for integrating work and learning. Barton (1996) and Wilson, Stull & Vinsonhaler (1996) identify a variety of work-based learning activities taking different names: co-op, internships, externships, apprenticeship, career academies, etc. Work-based learning programs should look for connections and develop collaborative relationships. The alternating and parallel co-op models may not meet the needs of returning adult students and dislocated workers needing retraining (Varty 1994). Alternatives such as extended-day programs emphasizing mentoring should be considered.

Connecting activities to integrate school- and work-based learning are an essential part of STW. At LaGuardia, the required co-op seminar helps students make connections by giving them a structure within which to reinforce employability skills, examine larger issues about work and society, and undertake the crucial activities of critical reflection (Grubb & Badway 1998).

Grubb & Badway (1998) and Grubb & Villeneuve (1995) found that the value of cooperative education is embedded in the culture of the institution (LaGuardia) and the region (Cincinnati). In this supportive culture, employer support does not have to be repeatedly obtained and there are clearly understood long-term expectations on all sides (schools, employers, students). This "informal culture of expectations around work-based learning may be more powerful in the long run than a complex set of regulations and bureaucratic requirements" (Grubb & Villeneuve 1995, p. 27).

However, even LaGuardia has found it difficult to sustain co-op culture over time (Grubb & Badway 1998). "The only way in which STW programs can find a permanent place in schools and colleges is for the work-based component to become so central to the educational purposes of the institutions that it becomes as unthinkable to give it up as it would be to abandon math, English, or science" (Grubb & Badway 1998, p. 28).

Finn (1997) believes that the answer lies in going beyond reconceiving co-op as an "educational strategy, pedagogy, model, methodology, or curriculum" (Finn 1997, p. 41). She asserts that it is time for cooperative education to develop and define its body of knowledge, investigate its unique phenomena-e.g., the concept of learning from experience, and clarify and strengthen the qualifications of co-op practitioners. For Ricks (1996), cooperative education is inherently committed to improving the economy, people's working lives, and lifelong learning abilities. It can thus position itself to serve the experiential learning needs of students into the 21st century.

Cates and Cedercreutz (2008) demonstrate that the assessment of student work performance as pursued by co-op employers, can be used for continuous improvement of curricula. The methodology, funded by the Fund for Postsecondary Education (FIPSE) has been developed to a level allowing institutionalization. The methodology could, when implemented over a larger front, provide a substantial competitive advantage for the entire field.

== Examples ==
- Work-study (federally subsidized campus employment) in the later twentieth century became a formal and major component of Student financial aid in the United States.
- The University of Waterloo has a cooperative education program with more than 19,000 students enrolled in co-op programs and more than 5,200 active co-op employers. Their five-year co-op program includes twenty four months of work experience. Enrolling in the co-op program at the University of Waterloo does not guarantee co-op employment. The school requires students to have a minimum of sixteen to twenty months of valid work experience (depending on the program of study) to successfully complete their academic program. Despite a high percentage of employment via the coop program, many students obtain employment by other methods, including a student's personal networks and unpaid full-time volunteering positions.
- Since its inception in 1975, the cooperative education program at Simon Fraser University (SFU) has grown to more than 8,400 students seeking paid work experiences across the globe. SFU's co-op programs span the faculties of Applied Sciences, Arts & Social Sciences, Business, Communication, Art & Technology, Education, Environment, Health Sciences, and Science. The university has worked with over 6,000 employers worldwide. An SFU student has won the Canada-wide title "Co-op Student of the Year" four times.
- Wilfrid Laurier University and the Lazaridis School of Business & Economics provide a co-op business program with a competitive entry limited to about one-third of the students who start the BBA program in their first-year. It offers three four-month work terms. Additionally, the school offers a co-op MBA program for high calibre students with less than two years of work experience.
- The University of British Columbia's cooperative education program includes over three thousand students from the faculties of Arts, Commerce, Engineering, Forestry, Kinesiology, and Science.
- The University of Victoria (UVic)'s cooperative education program offers hands-on learning for close to half of UVic students, with the number growing each year. Optional or mandatory co-op is available in almost every academic discipline. All UVic co-op students complete a professional practice course prior to their first work term, including intercultural training to help them contribute positively to diverse workplaces. Students also reflect on each work term experience using a competency-based framework. UVic's Co-op Program includes dedicated support for Indigenous and international students, and has developed unique international co-op exchange partnerships with employers and post-secondaries around the globe. The program launched in 1976.
- All Antioch College students participate in the college's Co-Op Program as part of their academic requirements for graduation. Under the program, students spend a total of four twelve-week terms, distributed throughout their undergraduate years, working as paid, full-time employees in local, national, or international settings. The program at Antioch, which is located in Yellow Springs, Ohio, began in 1921.
- The University of New South Wales (NSW) in Sydney provides an industry linked Co-op Scholarship. Students receive a scholarship of A$17,000 per annum for each year of their degree and current offerings span twenty four areas in business, engineering, science, and the built environment. Along with industry experience, the Co-op Program incorporates leadership and professional development in addition to networking and mentoring opportunities.
- The Florida Institute of Technology has a condensed cooperative education program allowing students to graduate in four years with three-semester work terms. This program is only followed by engineering students and requires students to take online coursework while they are working full-time as a cooperative education student.
- Drexel University in Philadelphia, Pennsylvania has one of the nation's oldest, largest, and best-known cooperative education programs. 91% of undergraduate students in over 75 majors participate in the co-op program. During their time at Drexel, students experience up to three different co-ops and gain up to 18 months of working experience. With over 1,700 employers in its network, Drexel's cooperative education program connects students with industry leaders across 35 states and 45 countries. Drexel's cooperative education program allows students to not only explore future careers, but also bring their cooperative education experiences back to the classroom. As a result of cooperative education, Drexel students graduate having already built a professional network, and they typically receive higher starting salaries than their counterparts from other schools. Students may also elect to participate in a Research Co-op to prepare them for a career in research or graduate school or an Entrepreneurship Co-op that will, in collaboration with the Close School of Entrepreneurship, assist them in establishing their own ongoing business. Specialized co-op experiences are also offered at the graduate level.
- Northeastern University in Boston, Massachusetts has a cooperative education program started in 1909. The program places about five thousand students annually with more than 2,500 co-op employers in Boston, across the United States, and around the globe. A student graduating from Northeastern with a five-year bachelor's degree has a total of eighteen months of internship experience with up to three different companies.
- Rochester Institute of Technology (RIT) began cooperative education in 1912.
- Georgia Institute of Technology (Georgia Tech) started cooperative education in 1912.
- Kettering University in Flint, Michigan, enrolls students in cooperative education from their first year on campus, specializing in engineering, science, and management degree programs.
- Baden-Württemberg Cooperative State University (DHBW) (Germany) has a cooperative education program with more than 34,000 students (2016) enrolled and more than 9,000 co-op employers. The three-year co-op undergraduate programs include one and a half year of compulsory internships. DHBW offers job integrated learning (JIL) programs only. In JIL, every DHBW student has to be employed by a single company during the complete duration of the study program. Lectures and compulsory internships are geared to maximize applied learning. Founded on March 1, 2009, DHBW traces its roots back to the Berufsakademie Baden-Wuerttemberg (founded 1974).
- Steinbeis Center of Management and Technology of Steinbeis University Berlin offers an international masters program (Master of Business Engineering) for graduates and young professionals which integrates practical and theoretical learning, along with on the job training by managing projects for a sponsoring company.
- Wentworth Institute of Technology has a two-semester cooperative education program with an optional third semester in the sophomore summer. Every student in the institute is required to do two co-ops. Cooperative education has been active since 1975 with over one thousand students in a co-op each year.
- EPUSP - Escola Politecnica da Universidade de São Paulo offers cooperative education in São Paulo, Brazil.
- TOBB University of Economics and Technology offers cooperative education in Ankara, Turkey.
- Purdue University has a top ten-ranked cooperative education program that was established in 1964. Originally exclusive to students in the College of Engineering, the co-op program is now available to students in 48 different disciplines in 8 of the academic colleges on campus. Purdue offers 5-session and 3-session co-op programs but differs from most universities in that students spend all 5 or 3 work sessions with the same employer, earning raises and gaining progressive responsibilities for each subsequent work rotation, for a total of 12–16 months of work experience. Both programs are 5-year academic programs, though students only pay tuition while studying on campus and pay a small administrative fee during each co-op work rotation. As of July 2014, there were over 600 students enrolled in co-op programs and over 500 qualified employers with locations around the nation and across the globe.
- To complete a bachelor of education at any Australian university, the individual must complete a minimum of 36 weeks of Practicum in a school faced environment doing work placement in their desired field, which includes helping the teacher to teaching a fully planned out class.
- For Australian high school students who are not completing ATAR courses, work placement is highly encouraged to gain necessary credits to complete graduation

== Specialized academic journals ==
- Asian-Pacific Journal of Cooperative Education
- Journal of Cooperative Education and Internships
- Journal of Workplace Learning
- International Journal of Work-Integrated Learning

== See also ==
- Cooperative learning
- Dual education system
- Experiential learning
- Intern
- Internship
- Manual labor college
- Practice-based professional learning
- Service-learning
- Work college
- Work-study
