= Dual education system =

System of secondary schooling incorporating vocational education

A dual education system combines apprenticeships in a company and vocational education at a vocational school in one course. This system is practiced in several countries, notably Germany, Austria, Switzerland, South Tyrol and in the German-speaking Community of Belgium, but also for some years now in France and South Korea.

In the Duales Ausbildungssystem, students can learn one of 250 (as of 2022) apprenticeship occupations (Ausbildungsberufe), such as Doctor's Assistant, Dispensing Optician or Oven Builder. The precise skills and theory taught are strictly regulated and defined by national standards: An Industriekaufmann (Industrial Manager) has always acquired the same skills and taken the same courses in production planning, accounting and controlling, marketing, HR management, trade laws, etc. Especially in southern Germany this model is also used for a special college system called Duale Hochschule.

In France, dual education (formation en alternance) has gained a lot of popularity since the 1990s, with information technology being the greatest draw. It is an approach to learning where students alternate between periods of academic studies and work experience. This hybrid model of education and vocational training is designed to give students both practical knowledge and theoretical skills, providing comprehensive understanding of the chosen field.

In South Korea, the German and Swiss dual apprenticeship system was studied and implemented by then President Park Geun-hye to address South Korea's more glaring employment needs including tackling the country's high youth unemployment rate and as well as reforming South Korea's entire education system. Since the rise of Meister schools and modern reforms through the implementation of vocational education in the South Korean education system, graduates from vocational high schools have been successful in navigating through South Korea's highly competitive and sluggish job market as they possess relevant skill sets that are in high demand in the South Korean economy.

== History of dual education in Germany ==
In Germany, the dual education system formally emerged after the passage of the Vocational Training Act of 1969. A description of its functioning and value is given in Pritchard (1992), It was significantly enhanced by reforms in 2005. Historically, vocational training was organized by the various guilds through apprenticeships, as their members sought to ensure that they had a talented labor pool to perpetuate their respective industries. The Vocational Training Act codified and standardized this system across Germany, serving as the foundation upon which the state, the private sector, and trade unions could effectively coordinate to deliver the dual system for a modern Germany. This high level of coordination allowed for the development of public education programs and firm specific apprenticeships that are complementary and mutually reinforcing.

== Apprenticeship section ==
As one part of the dual education course, students are trained in a company for three to five days a week. The company is responsible for ensuring that students get the standard quantity and quality of training set down in the training descriptions for each trade.

In Germany, this practical training may be complemented by more practical lessons at workshops run by the guilds and chamber of commerce, in order to compensate for the bias caused by training at only one company. These extra courses usually take three or four weeks a year. The time spent at vocational school is approximately 60 days a year, in blocks of one or two weeks at a time spread out over the year.

In France, the same amount of time is supposed to be spent in practical training and theory, with the following possible systems:

- 3 days in a company, 2 days at school,
- one week in a company, one week at school,
- three months in a company, three months at school
- six months in a company, six months at school.

French companies must provide a tutor or other person responsible for the students, or a human resources officer to supervise them. Their duties may involve daily tutoring and/or targeted training. French apprentices on the dual education course are paid a certain percentage of the minimum wage for the job they are learning.

== School section ==
The other part of the dual education course involves lessons at a vocational school (German: Berufsschule). The responsibility for this part of the course lies with the school authorities in every German state or Swiss canton. Both general lessons (for example German, politics, economics, religion or even sport) and trade-specific theory are taught.

Lessons may be taught part-time (one or two days a week) or in blocks of several weeks. The latter is preferred for trades learned by only a small number of students, where students may have to travel long distances to get to the nearest vocational school which teaches their subject.

== Testing ==
In Germany, for most trades, the first examination takes place about half-way through the vocational training and is only to test how well the student is doing so far: the marks do not go towards the final exam. Both exams are organised by the small business trade group and chamber of commerce and industry. Examinations for trained artisans are traditionally known as journeyman's tests (Gesellenprüfung).

Examinations for trades which have been recognised more recently are organised slightly differently. Here, the first examination counts as 40% of the total result, with the final examination making up the other 60%.

Those who fail the exam can apply to have their training extended until the following year when they can retake it. Only one extension is allowed.

== Advantages ==
The student is an employee of the company from the beginning and receives tasks that are according to their growing abilities. If a company is willing to make an employment-contract with the student after their dual education time, the company gets an employee who knows the company's workflow. The student can also benefit from the knowledge about both hard and soft skills of more experienced co-workers. The student develops under real conditions. Therefore, they can see if they are not able or willing to do this job quite early and not only after exams. Furthermore, the student earns money from the beginning.

Firms participating in early vocational training are more likely to hire graduates from dual education systems, particularly due to lower recruitment costs and increased prior familiarity with students' skills. The system has also lead to Germany having the lowest rate of youth unemployment in the European Union, with Austria having similarly low rates. It is also seen as a contributor to the economic success of Germany's globally-recognized firms with strong metrics in production and service delivery.

== Disadvantages ==
Although the dual education system is generally considered to be exemplary, more young people are taking vocational education and training courses at training sites and schools rather than in real companies, which are becoming less willing to take on apprentices for various reasons. The Cabinet of Germany considered making it compulsory for firms to take on apprentices. The idea was dropped when the trade associations agreed to a voluntary training pact.

Companies that take on apprentices have to follow many regulations, and the training itself is very expensive.

Requirements for several positions have become more complex and many high school graduates do not provide the right level of education. The less complex positions have only graduates with very little education are willing to do it, and even they are not able to keep up with the course.

Also, companies are often highly specialized and unable to train apprentices in all the required areas.

Two solutions put forward so far are "contractual education" (Auftragsausbildung) and state-run courses. The former would involve companies training apprentices that they do not plan to employ; the contract would also not be an employment contract. The latter would involve training outside companies: in schools and colleges.

The lack of places has changed the conditions in which apprentices are taken on. In 2004, one new company even advertised apprenticeships in information technology in which apprentices had to pay for the training themselves. The uproar was so great that the company was not able to start up.

Today, training companies decide the eligibility criteria based on their needs. Some may require a school-leaving certificate, while others focus on aptitude.

== Difficulties in exporting dual education ==
Although the dual education system seems promising at partnering future employees with potential jobs in their industry, it does not mean every country can simply create a dual education system within its borders. The system is successful in Germany because VET (the model for dual education) is regulated and strongly funded by both the federal government and German states and works closely with the German industry for maximum success. The model is unlikely to easily be adopted in other countries for a variety of reasons. Firstly, the high degree of success can be attributed to Germany's long-historical culture of apprenticeships. This system was grown in Germany over a period of time under very specific conditions and cannot easily be adapted in other modernized countries. One important degree of the dual education system is the high standard of education provided by the German government in Germany. This allows apprentices to not only specialize early on but maintain the basic education needed to react flexibly in the future. Another important aspect is that in other developed or developing countries, large social problems exist which prevent the creation or minimize the effectiveness of a potential dual education system. High-college costs and economic inequality mean that the local government must provide even more for certain individuals to succeed for the system to work. Finally, the long culture of apprenticeship makes sense in Germany but produces social stigmas in other foreign nations as it is seen as inferior as opposed to the traditional educational pathway.

== Present-day dual education ==
Today's system of dual education in Germany functions by cooperation between small and medium companies. Cooperation is regulated by law and employers and trade unions are responsible for creating new training regulations. Since certificates are standardized across all industries, the dual education system ensures that apprentices receive the same training regardless of region or company. Employers trust the certificates since they provide evidence of an individual's knowledge. There is also a shared responsibility between the government, employers and trade unions which helps in responding to digital landscapes or changing job markets which impact how effective future employees may be in the future job market. Dual education was designed to make it easier for employers seeking new employees by allowing them to test potential candidates as apprentices and create a smoother flow for the hiring process. Good schools are a critical factor to this system as they better prepare candidates for changing job conditions. The dual education system is not perfect and flaws do exist. Although creating specialization through early vocational training and apprenticeships programs can have its advantages, disadvantages also exist. As change accelerates in many industries, the skills of an individual apprentice become obsolete faster. Apprentices can excel early on in the job market but a lack of general skills and lifetime learning in new jobs cause them to do worse later on. Nonetheless, the dual education system is still very effective in stifling unemployment especially among the youth.

== Future of the dual education system ==
The modern era of rapid economic and technological change has expanded the role of the dual education system in the labor force. Increasingly, older workers are making use of the system to gain new skills in the ever-evolving labor market. This is known as Continuous Vocational Educational Training, or CVET. Given the robustness of the systems in Germany, Austria, and other similar countries, dual education may help these countries adapt more quickly to ongoing economic transformation.

== See also ==
- Apprenticeship
- Cooperative education
- Dual sector education
- Experiential learning
