= Power Drive =

Power Drive or Power Drives may refer to:

== Manufacturers ==
- Universal Power Drives, a British truck and car manufacturer

== Motors ==
- Yuneec Power Drive 10, a Chinese electric aircraft motor
- Yuneec Power Drive 20, a Chinese electric aircraft motor
- Yuneec Power Drive 40, a Chinese electric aircraft motor
- Yuneec Power Drive 60, a Chinese electric aircraft motor

== Music ==
- Power Drive, composed by Johnny Pearson

== Video games ==
- Power Drive (1987 video game), an arcade racing game from 1987 by Bally Midway
- Power Drive (1994 video game), a racing game from 1994 by Rage Software Ltd.
