= Yuneec Power Drive =

Yuneec Power Drive may refer to one of several electric aircraft motors:

- Yuneec Power Drive 10
- Yuneec Power Drive 20
- Yuneec Power Drive 40
- Yuneec Power Drive 60
