= Flightstar Sportplanes =

American aircraft manufacturer

- Company type: Private company
- Industry: Aerospace
- Founder: Tom Peghiny
- Fate: Business wound up in 2009
- Headquarters: South Woodstock, Connecticut, United States
- Products: Kit aircraft
- Website: www.flyflightstar.com

Flightstar Sportplanes was an American aircraft manufacturer based in South Woodstock, Connecticut. Its primary product was the Flightstar line of ultralight and two-seat training and light-sport aircraft, which were produced continuously from the mid-1980s. The company also distributed two other manufacturer's aircraft lines, engines and aviation products. The company business was wound up in 2009 and the Flightstar line sold to Yuneec International of China.

== History ==
The company was founded in the early 1980s by aircraft designer Tom Peghiny to build his initial commercial design the Flightstar ultralight. The Flightstar was intended for the US FAR 103 Ultralight Vehicles category with its maximum 254 lb (115 kg) empty weight requirement. The two-seat Flightstar II soon followed to fill the role of a trainer. The designs quickly became commercial successes and the basic design has been extensively developed over time. By 2007 over 700 single seaters had been sold.

In July 2009 Peghiny demonstrated a new version of his Spyder single seat model at EAA AirVenture Oshkosh. Designated the e-Spyder, it differs from earlier models in that it is electric-powered. The aircraft replaces the standard Spyder's normally fitted two-stroke engine with a Yuneec Power Drive 20 20 kW (27 hp) electric motor and two 28 lb (13 kg) lithium-polymer battery packs which provide a 40-minute endurance. The aircraft is intended to be developed into a commercially available kit and forecast to be available for under US$25,000.

Flightstar was also a distributor for Ballistic Recovery Systems parachutes, Rotax and HKS aircraft engines, Lockwood Aircraft supplies, the Leza-Lockwood Air Cam and Flight Design CT series of aircraft.

== Aircraft ==
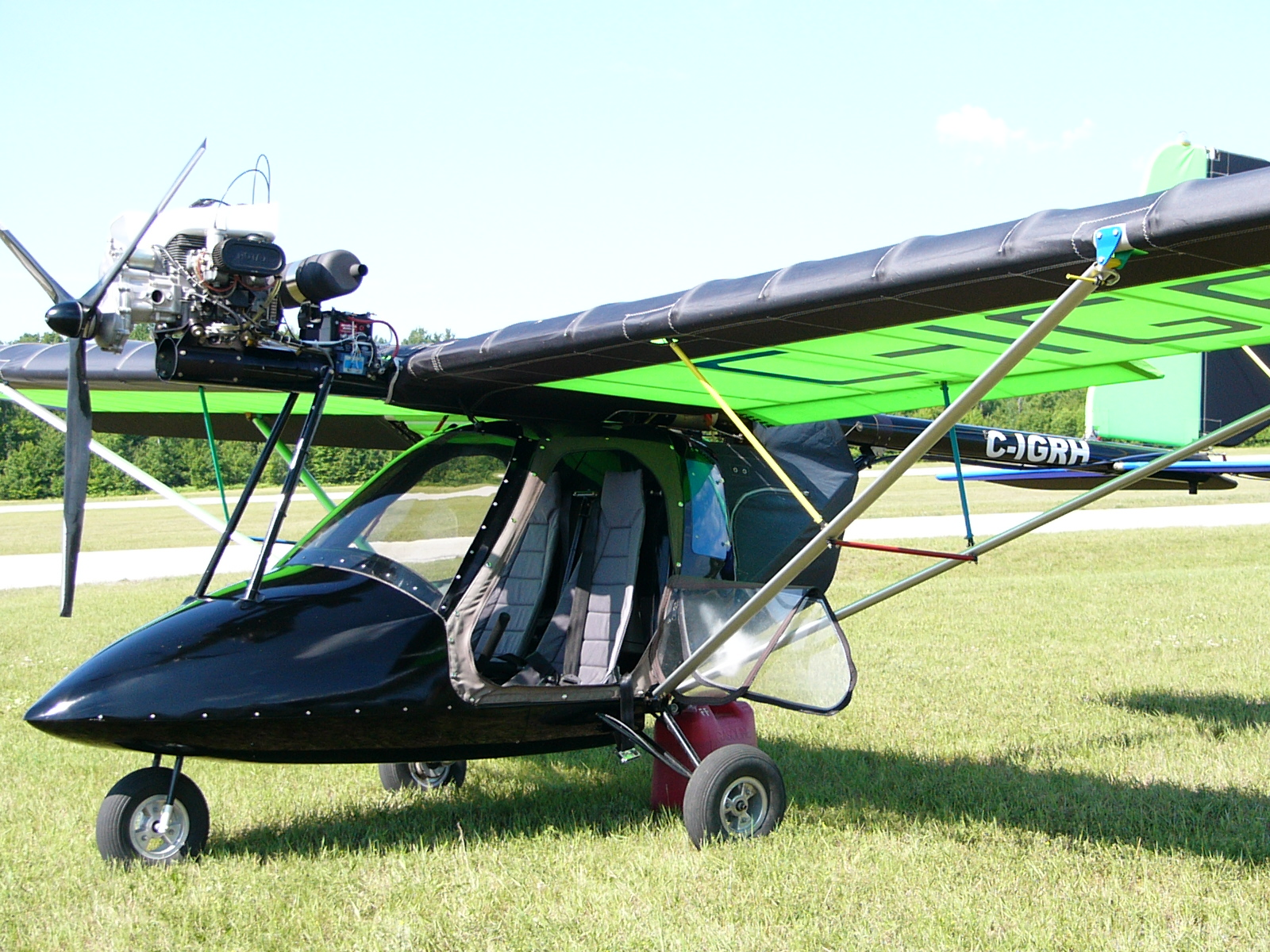
Flightstar II

Summary of aircraft built by Flightstar Sportplanes
Model name	First flight	Number built (by year)	Type
Flightstar	ca.1986		single seat ultralight
Flightstar Formula	1987	26 (1999)	single seat ultralight
Flightstar II	1987	58 (1999)	two-seat ultralight trainer
Flightstar Spyder	1993	700 (2007)	single seat ultralight
Flightstar IISL	1994	180 (2007)	two-seat ultralight trainer/Light-sport aircraft
Flightstar Loadstar		12 (2001)	single seat ultralight
Flightstar IISC		90 (2007)	two-seat ultralight trainer/Light-sport aircraft
Flightstar e-Spyder	2009	1 (2009)	single seat electric-powered ultralight
