= Avio Delta Thruster =

Bulgarian ultralight trike

Delta Thruster

General information
- Type: Ultralight trike
- National origin: Bulgaria
- Manufacturer: Avio Design
- Status: In production (2013)

History
- Variant: Yuneec International ETrike

The Avio Delta Thruster is a Bulgarian ultralight trike, designed and produced by Avio Design of Vetrino. The aircraft is supplied as a complete ready-to-fly-aircraft.

== Design and development ==
The aircraft was designed to comply with the US FAR 103 Ultralight Vehicles rules, including the category's maximum empty weight of 115 kg (254 lb). It is German DULV certified and can be flown with any suitable cable-braced hang glider high-wing. The aircraft features weight-shift controls, a single-seat open cockpit, tricycle landing gear and a single engine in pusher configuration. The hang glider wing can be replaced with a paraglider wing and requires ten minutes to convert.

The aircraft is intended to be quickly folded into a package small enough to fit into a car for ground transport.

The aircraft is made from bolted-together aluminum tubing, with its single or double surface wing covered in Dacron sailcloth. A number of different hang glider and paraglider wings can be fitted to the basic carriage. A typical hang gider wing used would have a 9.5 m (31.2 ft) span and would be supported by a single tube-type kingpost and use an "A" frame weight-shift control bar. The carriage front wheel is adjustable to allow for different pilot leg lengths.

The powerplant is a single cylinder, air-cooled, two-stroke, 28 hp (21 kW) Simonini Mini 2 engine. Without the wing, the aircraft has an empty weight of 32 kg (71 lb) and a gross weight of 200 kg (441 lb). The fuel tank holds 10 litres (2.2 imp gal; 2.6 US gal).

An electric version was under development in 2011.

== Specifications (Delta Thruster) ==
Data from Bayerl

General characteristics

- Crew: one
- Wingspan: 9.5 m (31 ft 2 in)
- Wing area: 12.3 m^{2} (132 sq ft)
- Empty weight: 32 kg (71 lb) carriage only
- Gross weight: 200 kg (441 lb)
- Fuel capacity: 10 litres (2.2 imp gal; 2.6 US gal)
- Powerplant: 1 × Simonini Mini 2 single cylinder, air-cooled, two stroke aircraft engine, 21 kW (28 hp)
- Propellers: 2-bladed wooden

Performance

- Wing loading: 16.3 kg/m^{2} (3.3 lb/sq ft)
