= Avio Design =

Avio Design Limited
- Company type: Privately held company
- Industry: Aerospace
- Headquarters: Vetrino, Bulgaria
- Products: Ultralight trikes Powered parachutes
- Website: avio-design.com

Avio Design is a Bulgarian aircraft manufacturer based in Vetrino. The company specializes in the design and manufacture of ultralight trikes and powered parachutes.

The company markets a range of single and two-seat trikes for recreational, flight training, forestry and agricultural aircraft applications, including the provision of ultra-low volume spray equipment.

== Aircraft ==
Summary of aircraft built by Avio Design
Model name	First flight	Number built	Type
Avio Delta Thruster			Single seat ultralight trike
Avio Design Swan			A series of two seat ultralight trikes
Avio Design ADler			Two seat powered parachute
