= Q500 =

Q500 may refer to:

== Aviation ==
- Q500 Pylon Racing, a category of air drone racing around pylons
- Yuneec International Q500 Typhoon, an air drone manufactured by Yuneec International
- Bombardier Q500, a proposed 90-seat stretched version of the Bombardier de Havilland Canada DASH-8 Q-series turboprop airliner

== Other uses ==
- Quantum Q500, a series of ST-506 hard drives manufactured by Quantum Corporation
- Xolo Q500, a System-on-a-Chip using a Qualcomm Snapdragon 200 core, see List of Qualcomm Snapdragon systems-on-chip
