= E430 =

E430 may refer to:

- E430, an E number compound.
- Mercedes-Benz E430, a passenger car
- Yuneec International E430, a two-seat electric aircraft
