= Yuneec International ETrike =

Chinese electric aircraft

ETrike

General information
- Type: Ultralight trike
- National origin: China
- Manufacturer: Yuneec International
- Status: Prototypes only

The Yuneec International ETrike is a Chinese electric ultralight trike that was designed and produced by Yuneec International of Kunshan, Jiangsu. The aircraft was originally intended to be supplied complete and ready-to-fly, but does not seem to have progressed beyond a few prototypes.

By 2013 the ETrike was not offered for sale by either Yuneec International or its North American licensee, GreenWing International.

== Design and development ==
The ETrike airframe is based upon the Avio Delta Thruster and designed to comply with the American FAR 103 Ultralight Vehicles rules, including the category's maximum empty weight of 254 lb (115 kg). It features a cable-braced hang glider-style high-wing, weight-shift controls, a single-seat open cockpit without a cockpit fairing, tricycle landing gear and a single electric motor in pusher configuration.

The aircraft is made from bolted-together aluminum tubing, with its double surface wing covered in Dacron sailcloth. Its 9.5 m (31.2 ft) span wing is supported by a single tube-type kingpost and uses an "A" frame weight-shift control bar. The powerplant is a 14 hp (10 kW) Yuneec Power Drive 10 electric motor.

== Specifications (ETrike) ==
Data from Bayerl

General characteristics

- Crew: one
- Wingspan: 9.5 m (31 ft 2 in)
- Wing area: 12.3 m^{2} (132 sq ft)
- Gross weight: 200 kg (441 lb)
- Powerplant: 1 × Yuneec Power Drive 10 electric aircraft engine, 10 kW (14 hp)
- Propellers: 2-bladed composite

Performance

- Wing loading: 16.3 kg/m^{2} (3.3 lb/sq ft)
