= Flightstar =

Type of aircraft

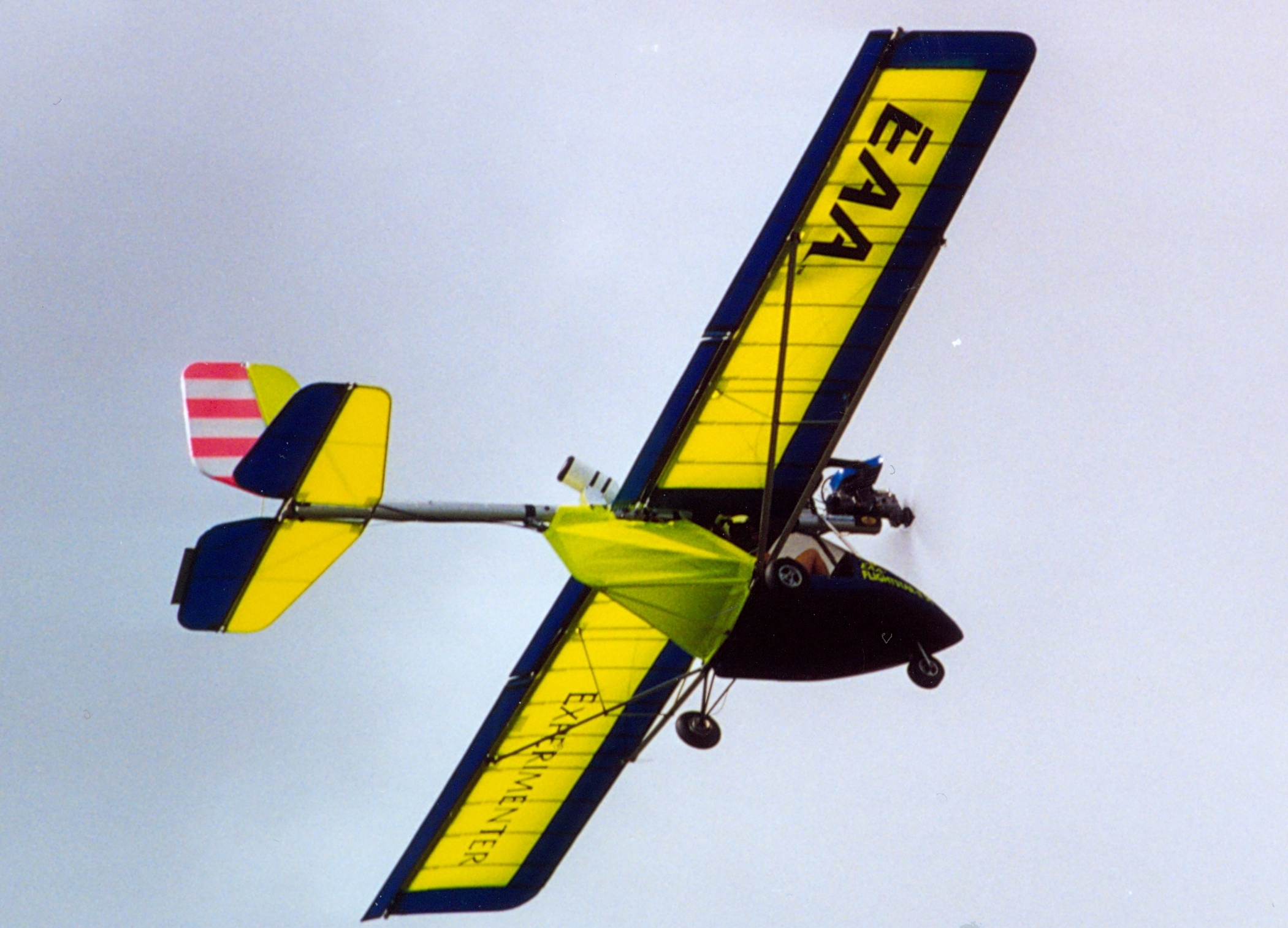
- Flightstar IISL

General information
- Type: Ultralight aircraft
- National origin: United States
- Manufacturer: Flightstar Sportplanes
- Designer: Tom Peghiny
- Status: Out of production

History
- Manufactured: 1987-2009
- Introduction date: 1987
- First flight: 1987

The Flightstar is a large family of single and two-seat, high wing, single engined kit aircraft that was produced by Flightstar Sportplanes of South Woodstock, Connecticut. In 2009 the rights, tooling and parts inventory were sold to Yuneec International of China when Flightstar Sportplanes' business was wound up.

== Development ==
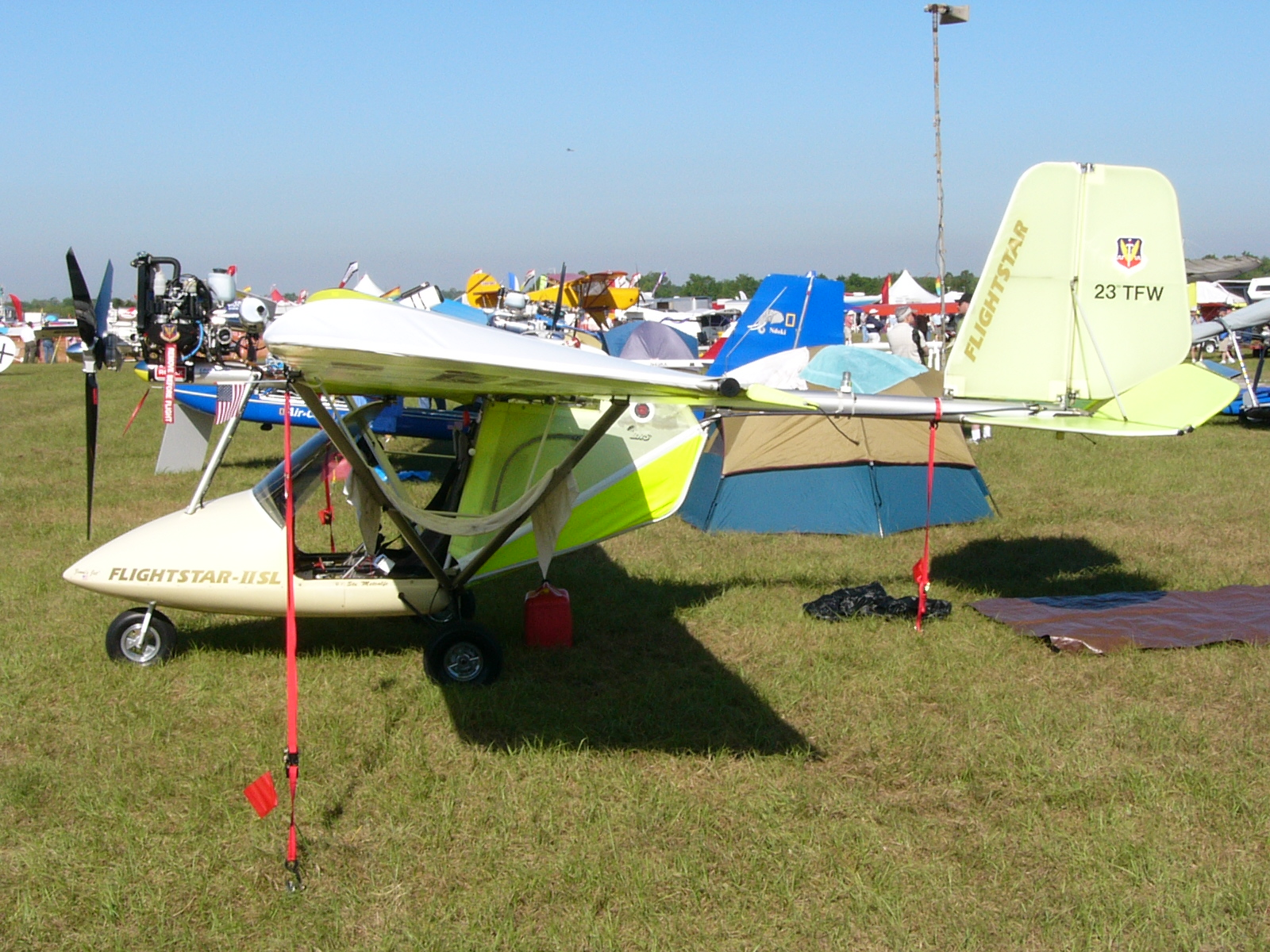
Flightstar IISL

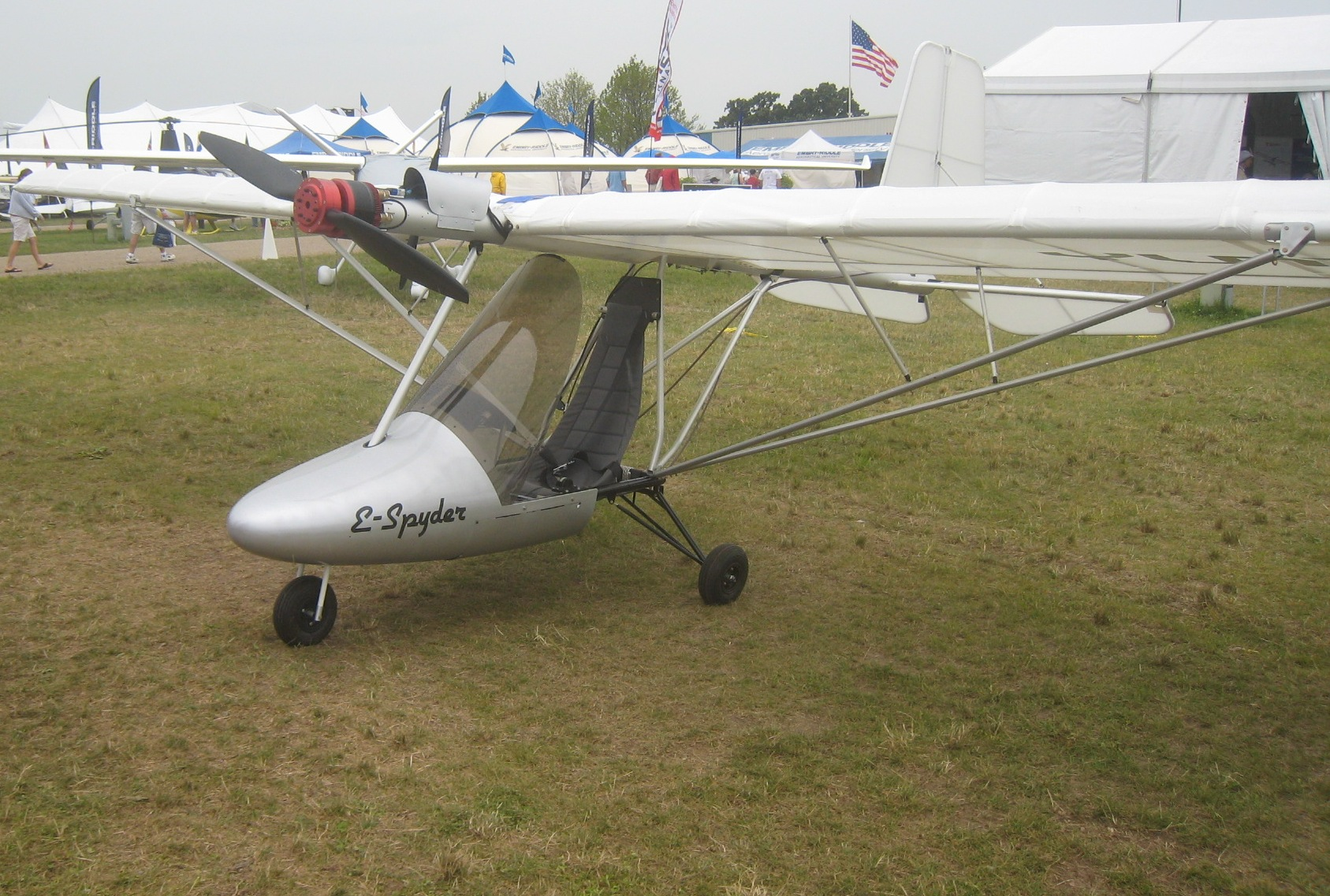
e-Spyder

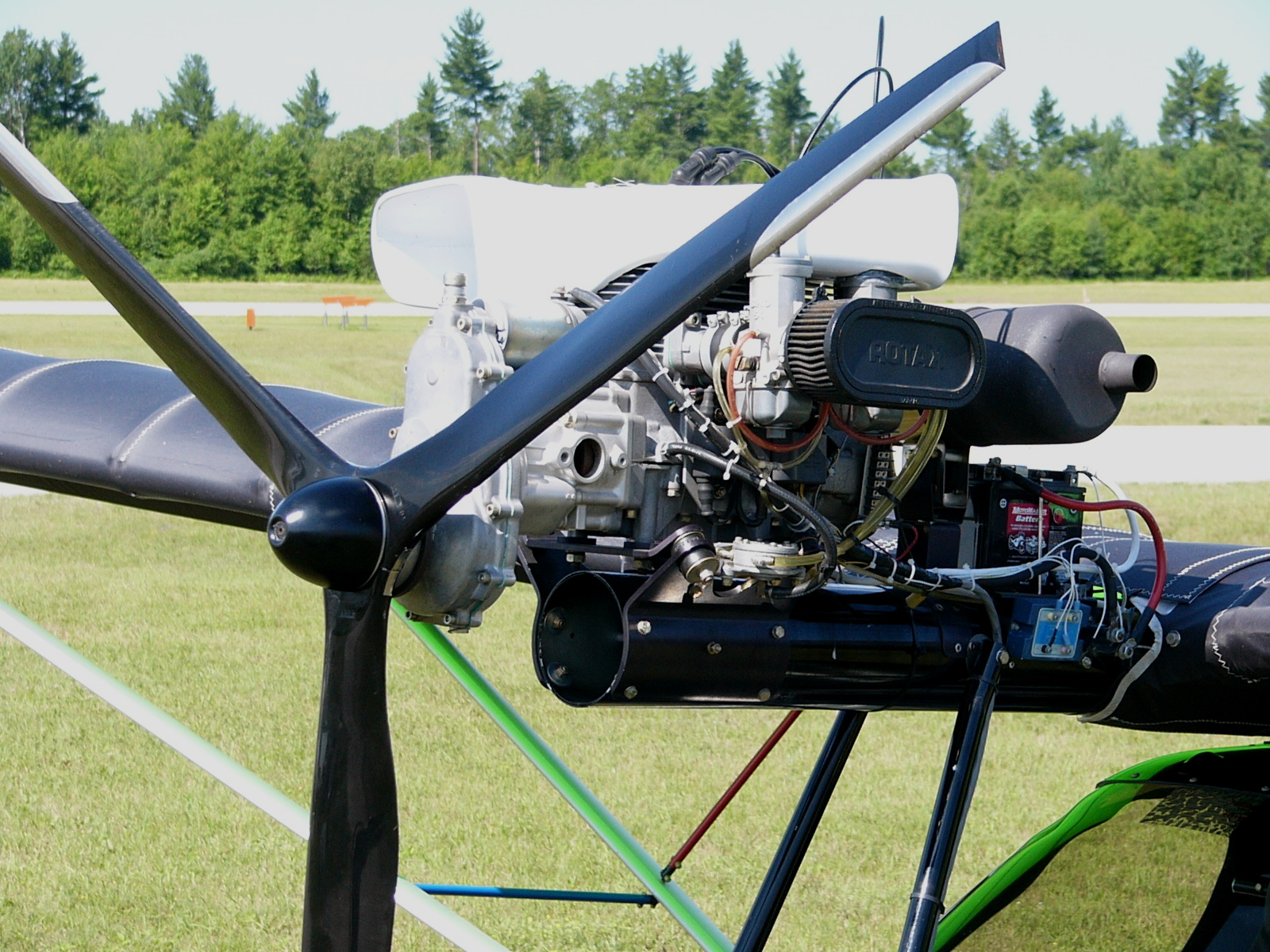
The Rotax 503 engine installation on a Flightstar II

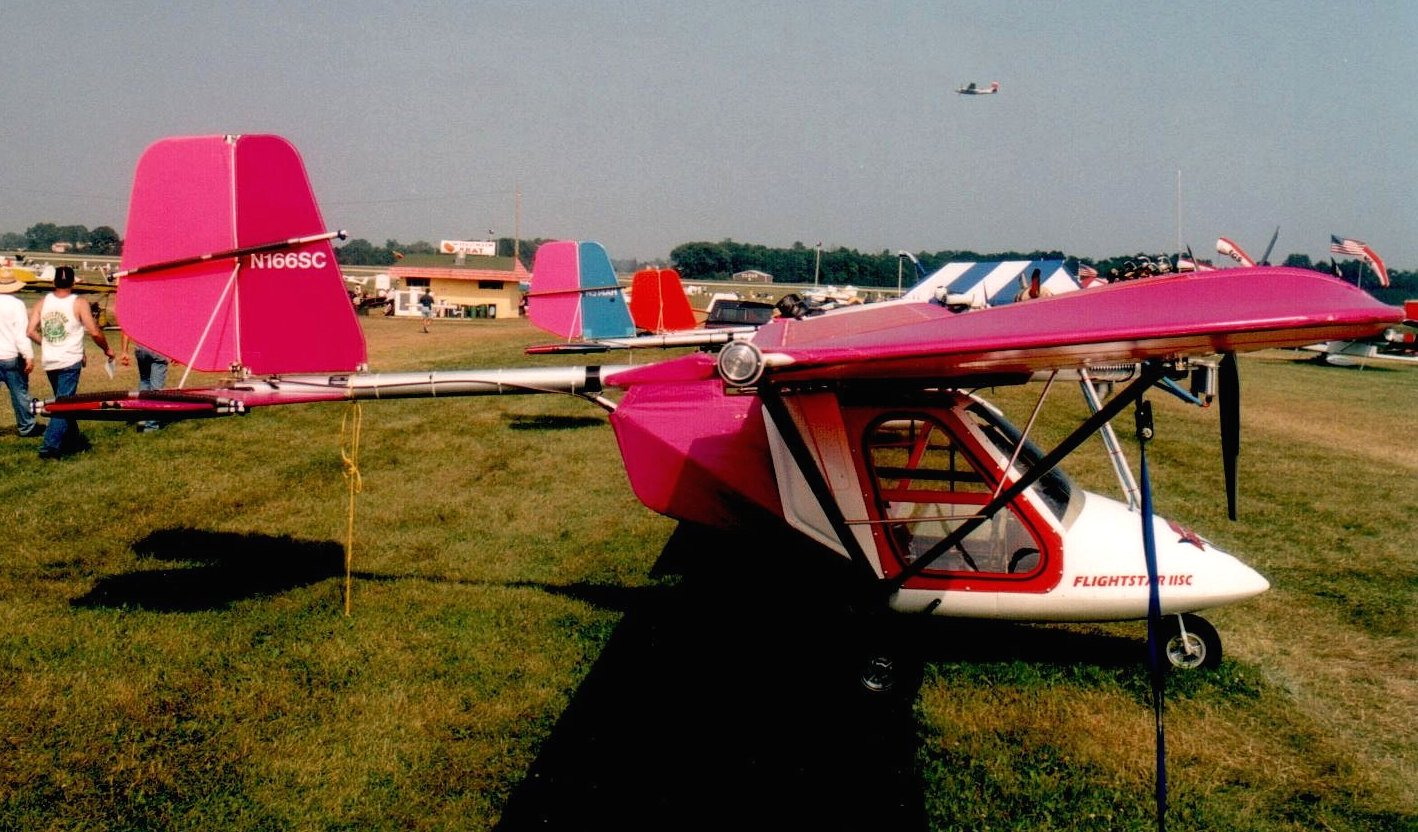
Flightstar IISC

Flightstar designer Tom Peghiny built the first Flightstar in the mid-1980s for the US FAR 103 Ultralight Vehicles category with its maximum 254 lb (115 kg) empty weight requirement. The two-seat Flightstar II soon followed to fill the role of a trainer. The designs quickly became commercial successes and the basic design has been extensively developed over time. By 2007 over 700 single seaters had been sold.

All models are constructed from anodized aluminum tubing assembled with bolts. The fuselage is suspended from a keel tube that also mounts the engine at the front, the tail at the back and the wings. The wings are strut-braced and utilize jury struts. The wings and tail surfaces are covered in pre-sewn Dacron envelopes, which reduces construction time. The wings have full-span ailerons, while the tail features conventional elevators and rudder. The landing gear is a tricycle gear arrangement with bungee suspension on the main wheels. The nosewheel is steerable and mainwheel brakes are an available option. The reported construction time for the single seat models is 100 hours.

The fuselage is built around an overhead aluminum tube keel that mounts the tail at the back, the wings and fuselage in the centre and the engine at the front. The pod-type cockpit fairing is made from fibreglass and includes a windshield.

The two seat models all have side-by-side seating and have folding wings. Reported construction time for the current two seat models is 150 hours.

Reviewer Andre Cliche described the Flightstar line as: "a strong ultralight that is built to last" and particularly singled out the control system for praise saying: "the controls are well-balanced, light and authoritative."

In July 2009 a new single seat model was exhibited at EAA AirVenture Oshkosh. The e-Spyder is an electric-powered version of the Sportstar Spyder, developed by Tom Peghiny. The aircraft replaces the Spyder's two-stroke engine with a Yuneec Power Drive 20 20 kW (27 hp) electric motor and two 28 lb (13 kg) Lithium polymer battery packs which provide a 40-minute endurance. The aircraft is intended to be developed into a commercially available kit and forecast to be available for under US$25,000.

The aircraft are also produced under licence in India by Albatross Flying Systems.

== Variants ==
=== Single seat ===
Flightstar
Original mid-1980s single seat ultralight with an empty weight of 250 lb (113 kg), powered by the 26 hp (19 kW) Rotax 277 engine
Flightstar Formula
Improved single seat version with complete fairing and an empty weight of 320 lb (145 kg). First flown in 1987 Powered by the 42 hp (31 kW) Rotax 447 or 50 hp (37 kW) Rotax 503 engine
Flightstar Spyder
Further refined single seat version first flown in 1993. Partial or complete fairing and an empty weight of 280 lb (127 kg) with the 42 hp (31 kW) Rotax 447. Can be operated in the US ultralight vehicle category if equipped with a lighter single-cylinder engine
Flightstar Loadstar
Fuselage, wings and tail of the Flightstar II with just a single seat fitted, intended for use on floats or to tow hang gliders. Empty weight of 340 lb (154 kg) with the 50 hp (37 kW) Rotax 503.

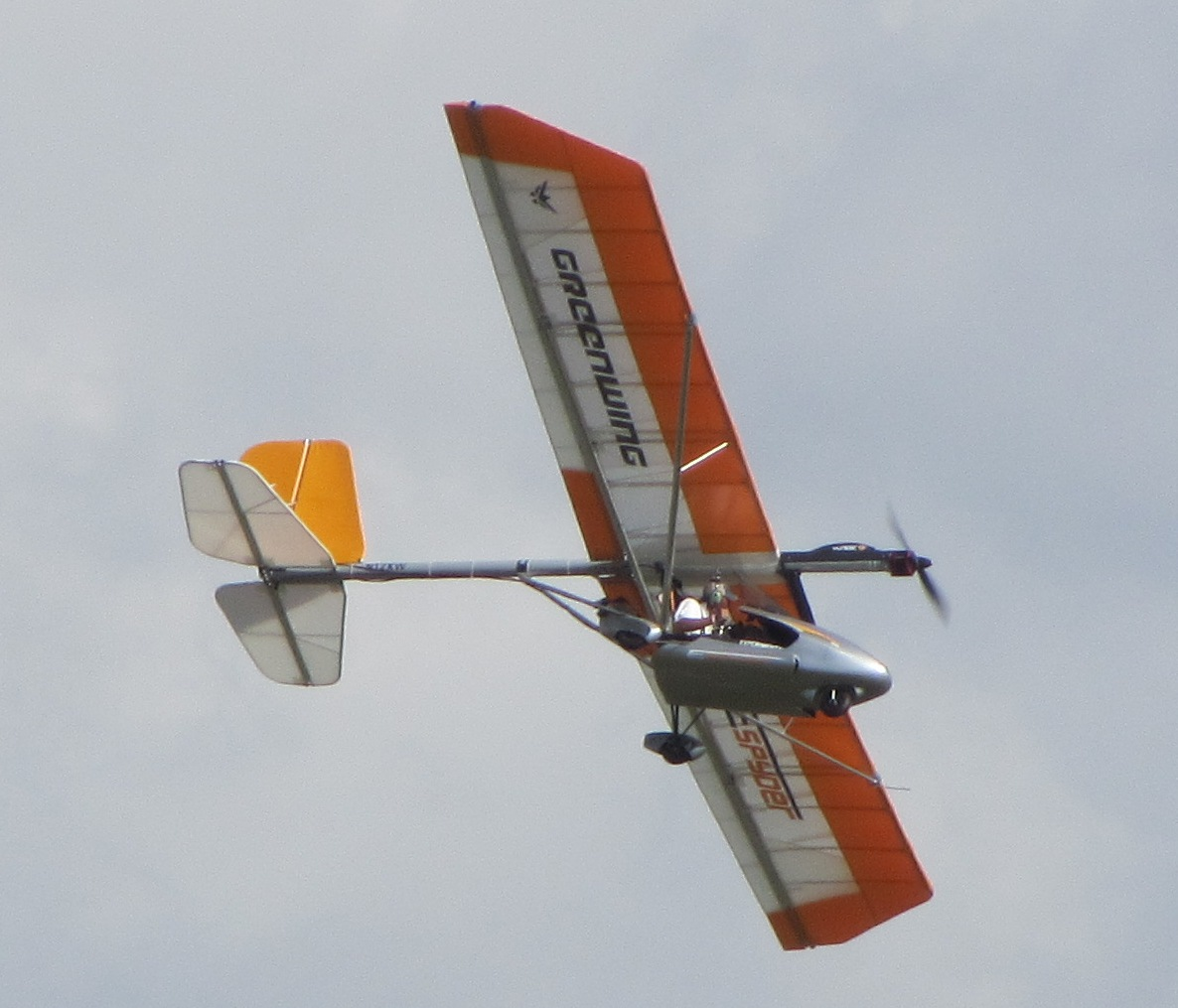
Greenwing ESpyder

Flightstar e-Spyder
Electric aircraft development of the Spyder in conjunction with Yuneec International of China. Equipped with a Yuneec Power Drive 20 20 kW (27 hp) electric motor and two 28 lb (13 kg) lithium-polymer battery packs which provide a 40 minute endurance. First flown in July 2009. Qualifies as a US single seat ultralight with an empty weight of 253 lb (115 kg). In June 2013 it was announced that the aircraft would be produced, marketed and supported by GreenWing International. In July 2013 the aircraft received German DULV certification, to become the first electric-powered aircraft to be certified by a national authority. By 2014 GreenWing was out of business.

=== Two seat ===
Flightstar II
Original two-seat ultralight trainer first flown in 1987 with an empty weight of 365 lb (166 kg) and powered by the 26 hp (19 kW) Rotax 277 engine, 50 hp (37 kW) Rotax 503, 60 hp (45 kW) HKS 700E four-stroke or the 64 hp (48 kW) Rotax 582
Flightstar IISL
Improved "Sport Light" two-seat version, first flown in 1994. Empty weight of 365 lb (166 kg), partial cockpit fairing was standard and full fairing optional. Powered by the 50 hp (37 kW) Rotax 503, 60 hp (45 kW) HKS 700E four-stroke or the 64 hp (48 kW) Rotax 582
Flightstar IISC
Improved two-seat "Sport Cabin" version. Empty weight of 465 lb (211 kg), powered by the 50 hp (37 kW) Rotax 503, 60 hp (45 kW) HKS 700E four-stroke or the 64 hp (48 kW) Rotax 582

== Specifications (Flightstar II) ==
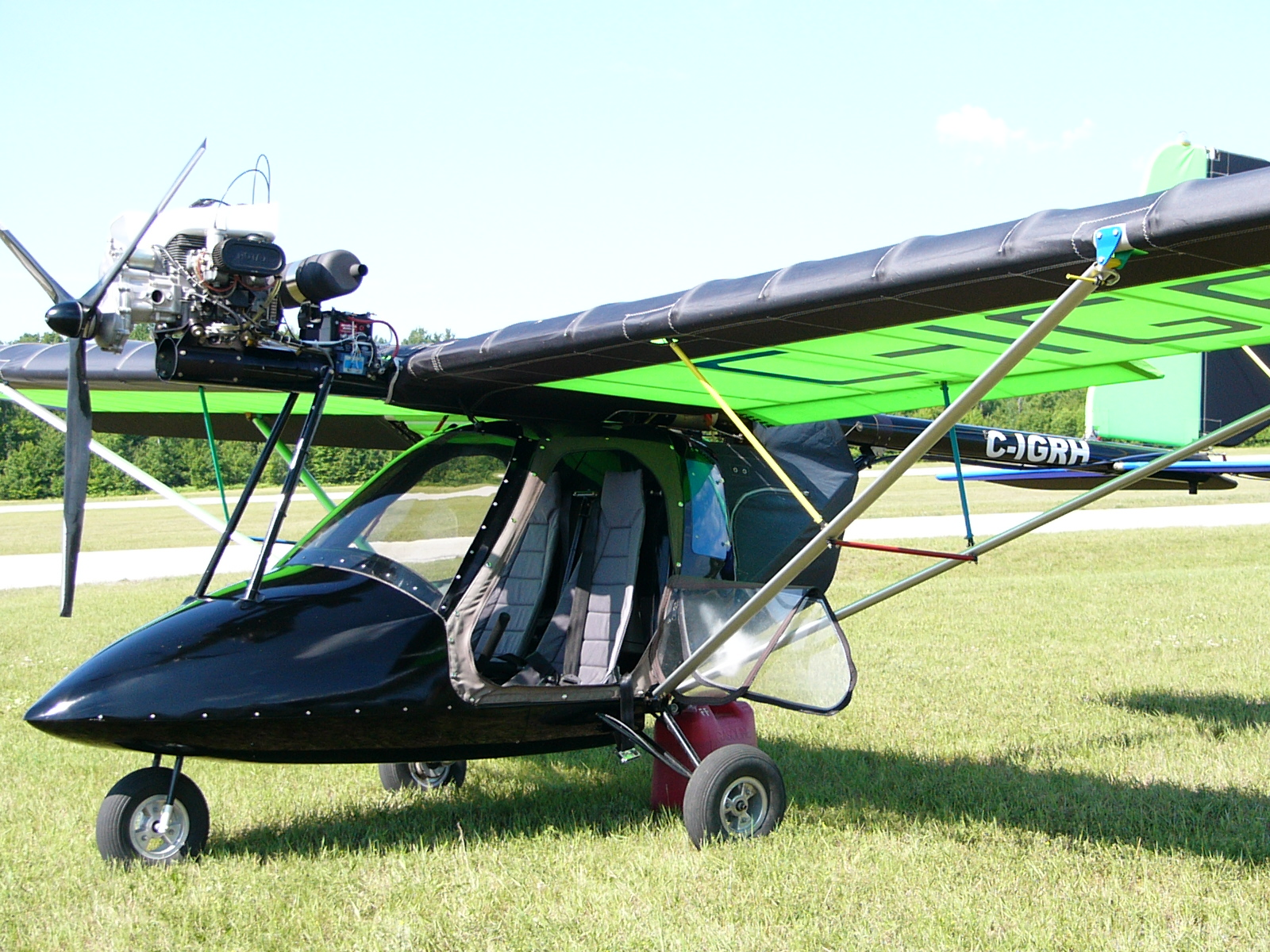
Flightstar II

Data from Kitplanes

General characteristics

- Crew: one
- Capacity: one passenger and 520 lb (236 kg) useful load
- Length: 15 ft 0 in (4.56 m)
- Wingspan: 32 ft 0 in (9.76 m)
- Height: 7 ft 6 in (2.29 m)
- Wing area: 157 sq ft (14.60 m^{2})
- Empty weight: 430 lb (195 kg)
- Max takeoff weight: 950 lb (431 kg)
- Powerplant: 1 × HKS 700E two-cylinder four-stroke, 60 hp (45 kW)

Performance

- Maximum speed: 96 mph (156 km/h, 83 kn)
- Cruise speed: 75 mph (122 km/h, 65 kn)
- Stall speed: 36 mph (58 km/h, 31 kn)
- Range: 345 mi (559 km, 300 nmi)
- Service ceiling: 12,000 ft (3,660 m)
- Rate of climb: 800 ft/min (4.06 m/s)
- Wing loading: 6.05 lb/sq ft (29.52 kg/m^{2})
- Power/mass: 15.83 lb/hp (0.104 kW/kg)

== See also ==
Aircraft of comparable role, configuration, and era

- Aero-Works Aerolite 103
- Avid Champion
- Beaujon Mach .07
- Beaujon Enduro
- Birdman WT-11 Chinook
- Hy-Tek Hurricane 103
- ISON Airbike
- Phantom X1
- Skystar Kitfox Lite
- Spectrum RX-28 Beaver
