= Yuneec International Typhoon H =

Typhoon H
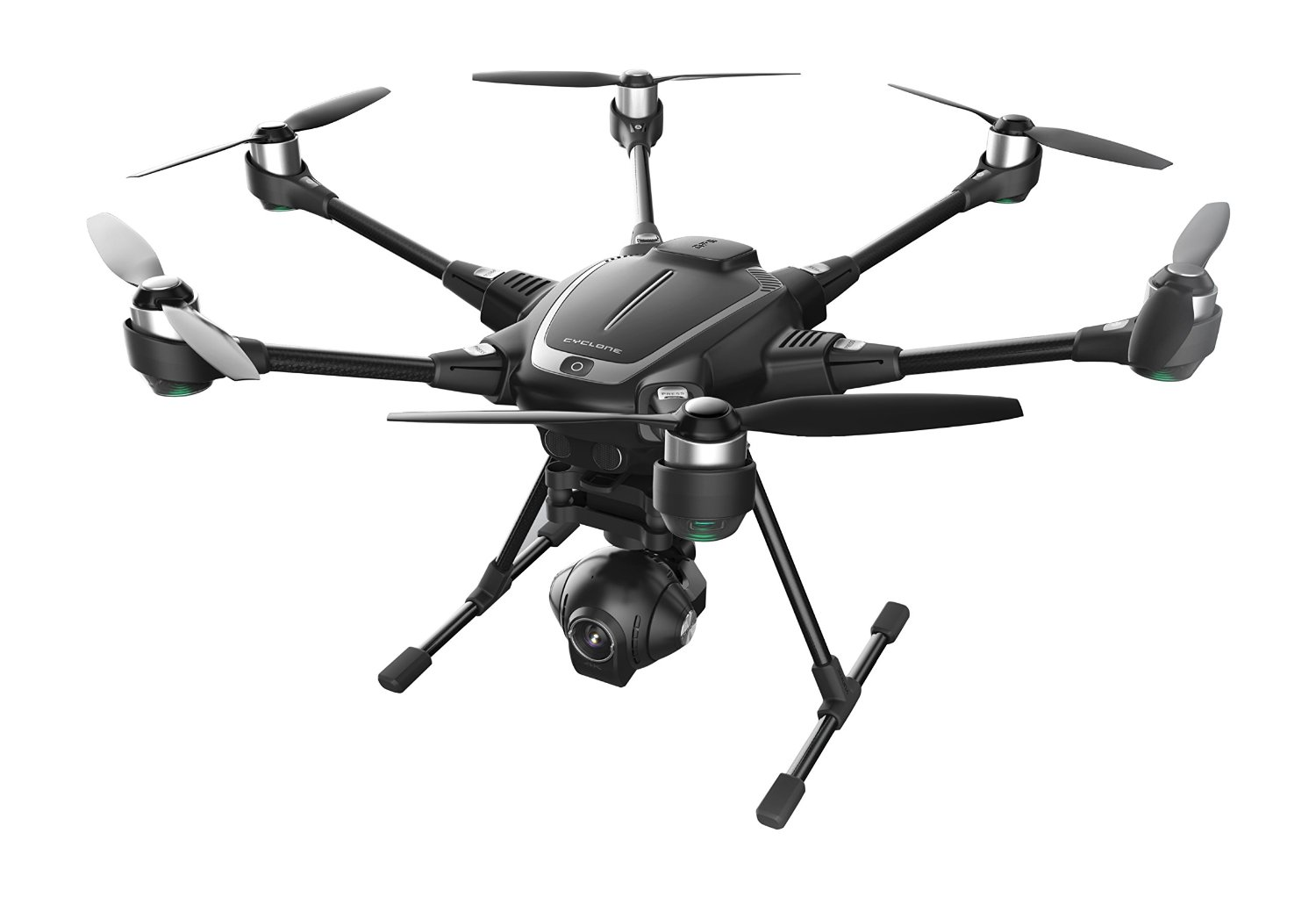
- Typhoon H

General information
- Type: Camera drone
- National origin: China
- Manufacturer: Yuneec International

History
- Introduction date: 2016

The Typhoon H is a 6 rotor multicopter or UAV produced by Yuneec International which was launched in April 2016.

== Design and development ==
Significant features of the Typhoon H may be summarized as follows

- Ready to fly
- 3-axis anti-vibration gimbal camera with full 360° rotation, up to 4k resolution
- Retractable landing gear
- Front facing ultrasonic collision detection with optional INTEL REALSENSE collision avoidance
- Folding rotor arms
- Remote control incorporating built in 7" Android Tablet
- 22 minutes flight time
- Choice of 5.8 GHz or 2.4 GHz radio transmission
- ST16 radio transmitter with built in video streaming feed directly from Typhoon H
- CGO3+ 4K lens camera
- Autonomous flight with way points, orbit mode, follow me mode, and tracking mode
- GPS (Global Positioning System)
- Return to home feature which enables the pilot to press return to home and the Typhoon H will fly and land back at its starting point
- Altitude and position holding
- 5 rotor mode which enables the pilot to land safely if one motor is damaged during flight
- Durable and quality carbon fiber/hard plastic material

The Typhoon H is considered an upgrade to the DJI Phantom 3 and 4 and Spreading Wings model line as well as the DJI Inspire Pro and is designed specifically for aerial photography and cinematography.

An upgraded version of the Typhoon H that includes a vision based collision avoidance system called 'Intel RealSense' was demonstrated at the CES 2016 trade show.

A key reason why the Typhoon H has been successful in the aerial cinematography world and is often preferred to models like DJI's Phantom and Inspire, is because of the built in Android Tablet to the 2.4ghz transmitter. This provides built in telemetry and direct camera streaming. The drone is also known for its unusually high camera quality out of the box which companies such as DJI have lacked. Although the range on the Typhoon H is not as far as the DJI Phantom lineup, many professional cinematographers have said they prefer the low latency transmission Both drones do operate with full control well beyond eyesight.

Yuneec announced on 9 January 2018 a big brother to the Typhoon H called the Typhoon H Plus. It will be the same design as the original, but with an improved camera, larger frame, and longer flight times.

== See also ==
- History of unmanned aerial vehicles

Aircraft of comparable role, configuration, and era

- DJI Inspire
- DJI Phantom

Related lists

- List of unmanned aerial vehicles
