= Vetrino =

Vetrino Ветрино
- Location of Vetrino
- Coordinates: 43°19′N 27°26′E
- Country: Bulgaria
- Provinces (Oblast): Varna

Government
  - Mayor: Georgi Andreev
- Elevation: 205 m (673 ft)

Population (December 2009)
  - Total: 1,036
- Time zone: UTC+2 (EET)
  - Summer (DST): UTC+3 (EEST)
- Postal Code: 9220
- Area code: 05161

Vetrino (Bulgarian: Ветрино, pronounced [ˈvɛtrino]) is a village in northeastern Bulgaria, part of Varna Province. It is the administrative centre of the homonymous Vetrino Municipality, which lies in the western part of the Province. The village is located about 45 kilometres from the provincial capital of Varna and nearly the same distance from Shumen. As of December 2009, the village has a population of 1,036 inhabitants.

Vetrino is twinned with Dubňany in the Czech Republic, Bilhorod-Dnistrovskyi in Ukraine and Yeniçiftlik in Turkey.

Vetrino Glacier on Smith Island, South Shetland Islands is named after Vetrino.

East of Vetrino at 43°18'52"N 27°30'25"E, there is Bulgaria's only 750 kV-substation. There are only three other facilities of this kind in the European Union.

== Municipality ==
Vetrino municipality covers an area of 293 square kilometres (of which 206 square kilometres arable) and includes the following 10 places:

- Belogradets
- Dobroplodno
- Gabarnitsa
- Mlada Gvardiya
- Momchilovo
- Nevsha
- Neofit Rilski
- Sredno Selo
- Yagnilo
- Vetrino

== Gallery ==
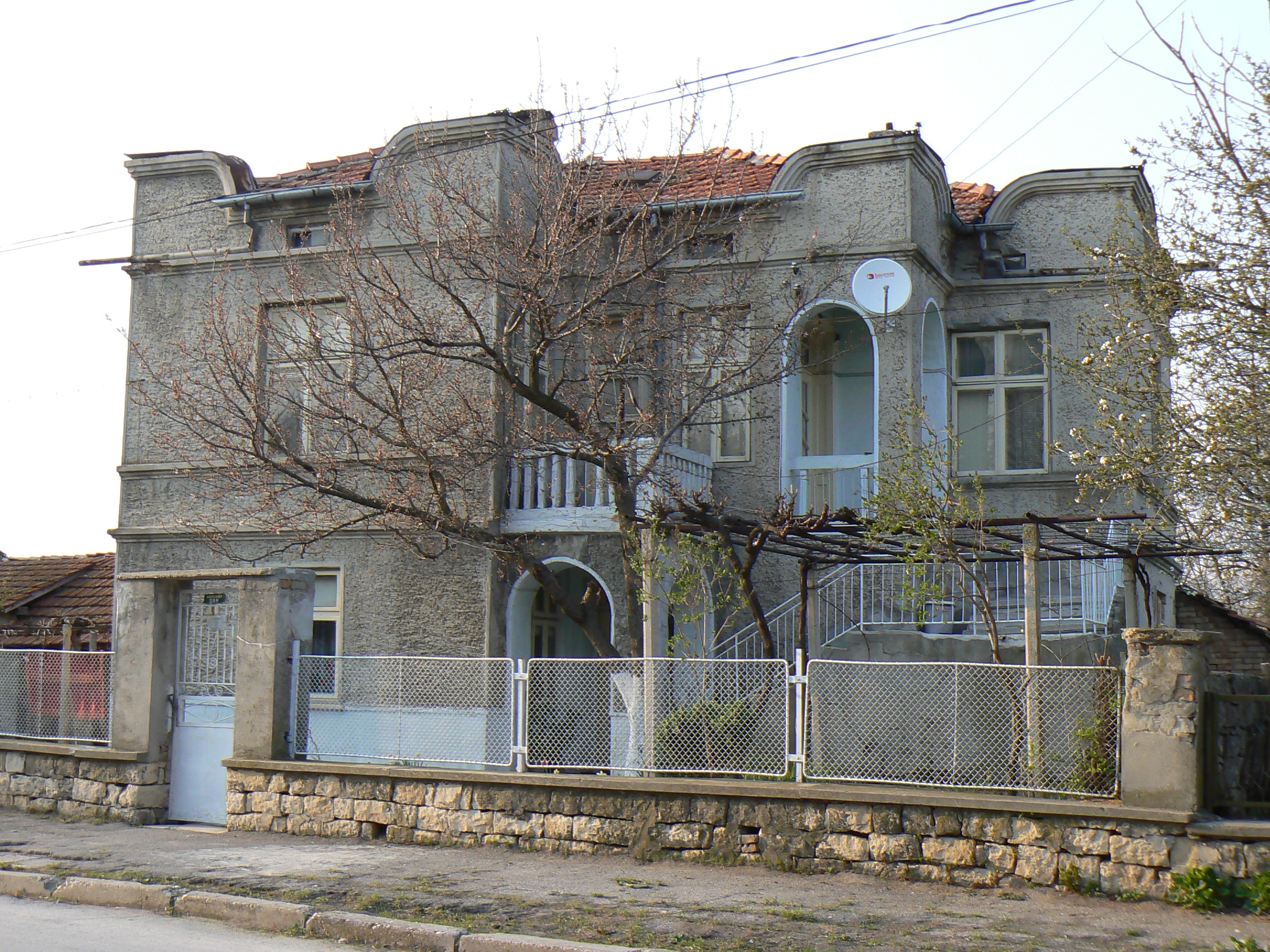
House

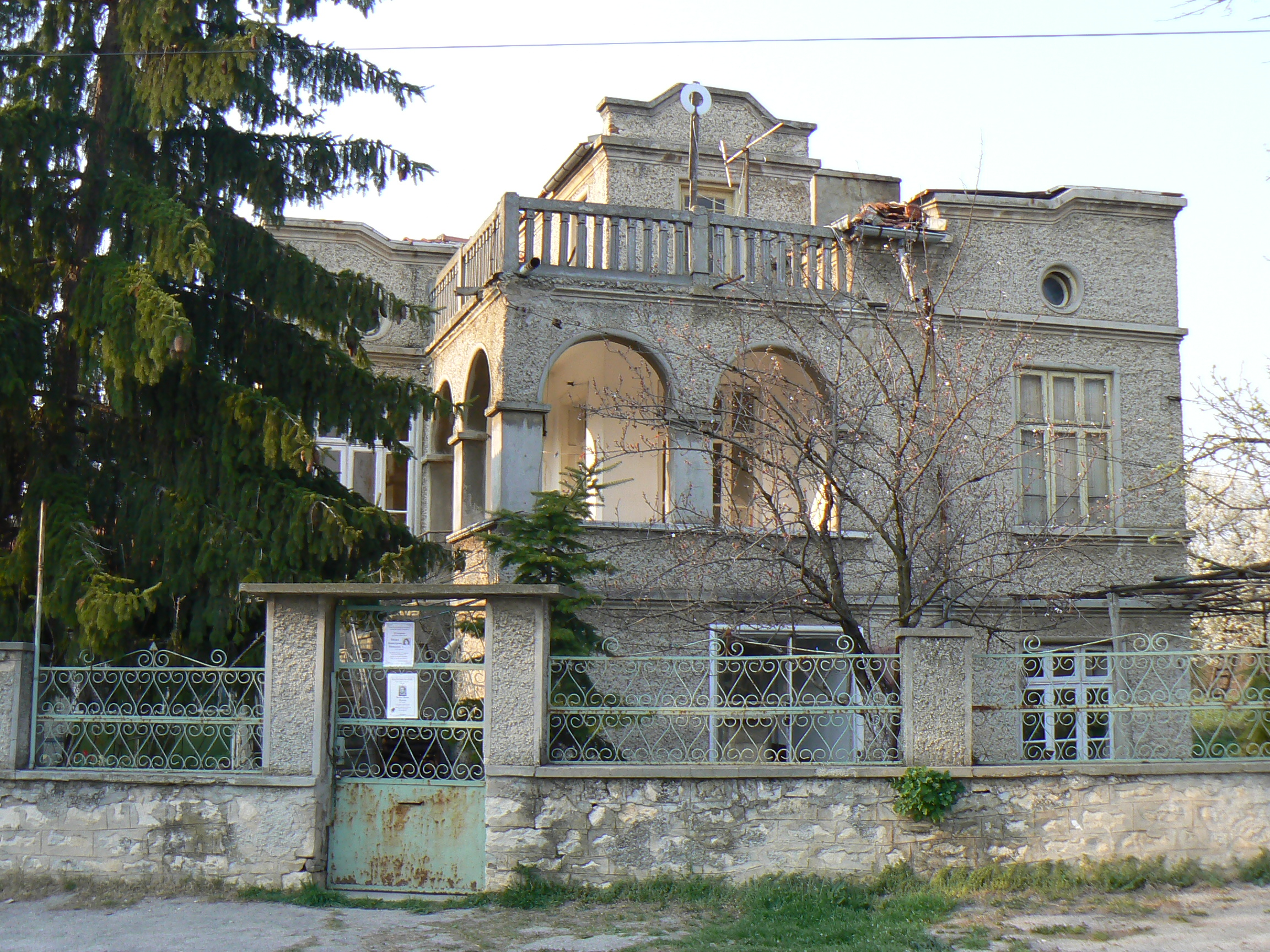
House

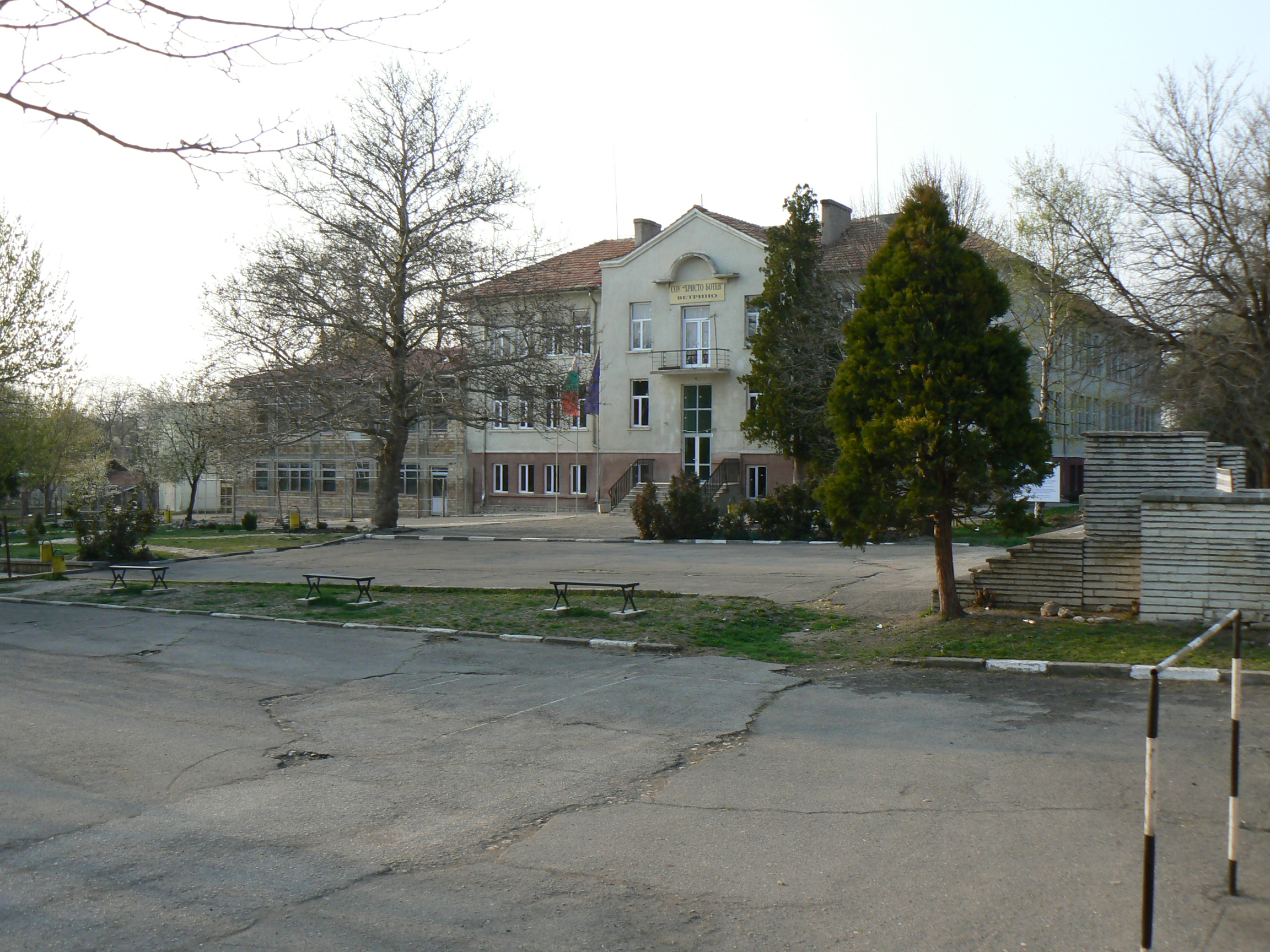
Hristo Botev School

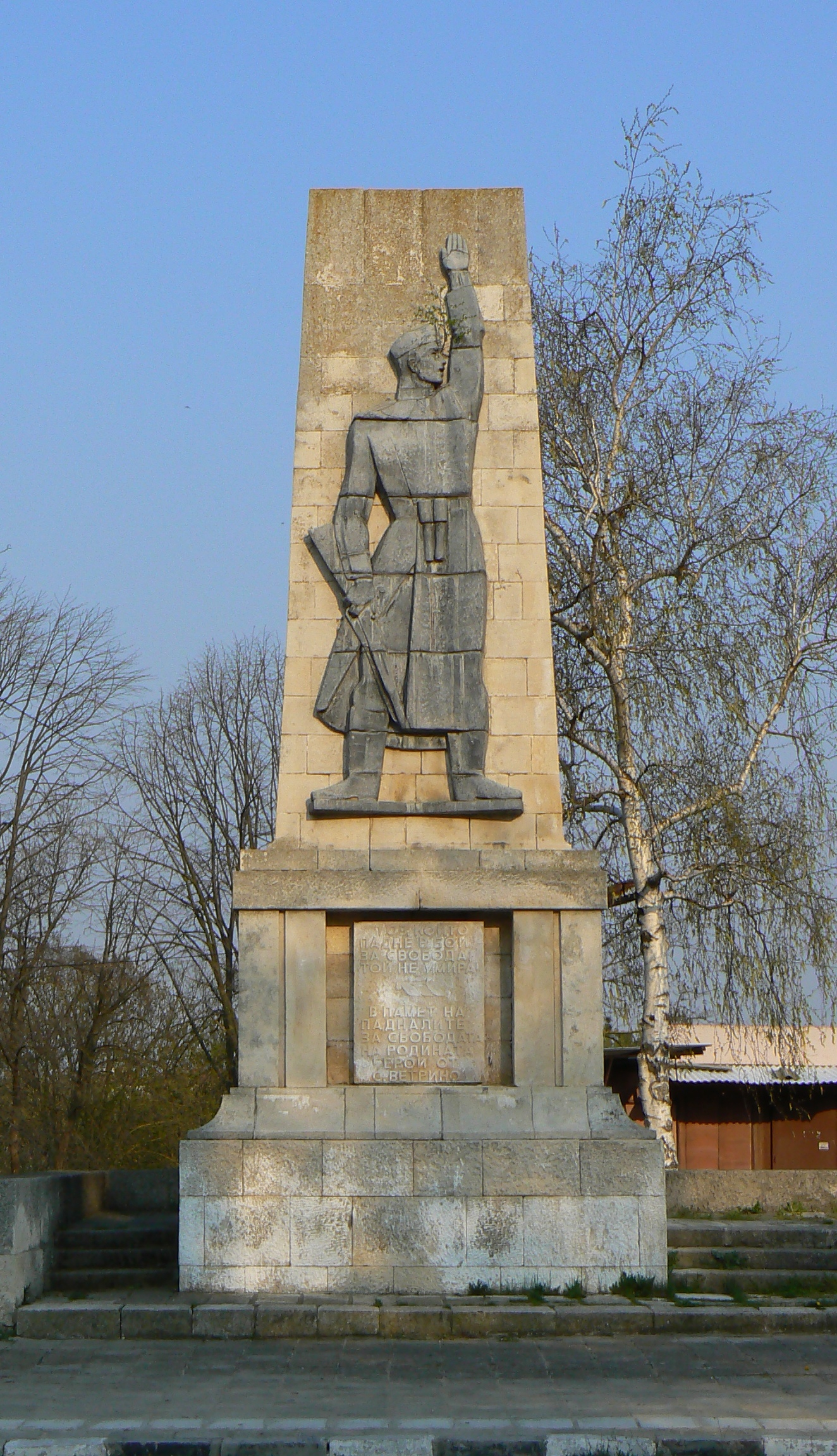
War memorial
