= Vetrino Municipality =

Vetrino Municipality Община Ветрино
- Municipality
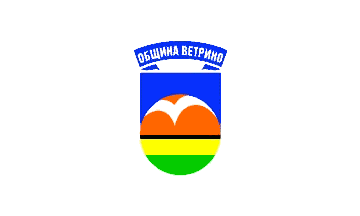
- Flag

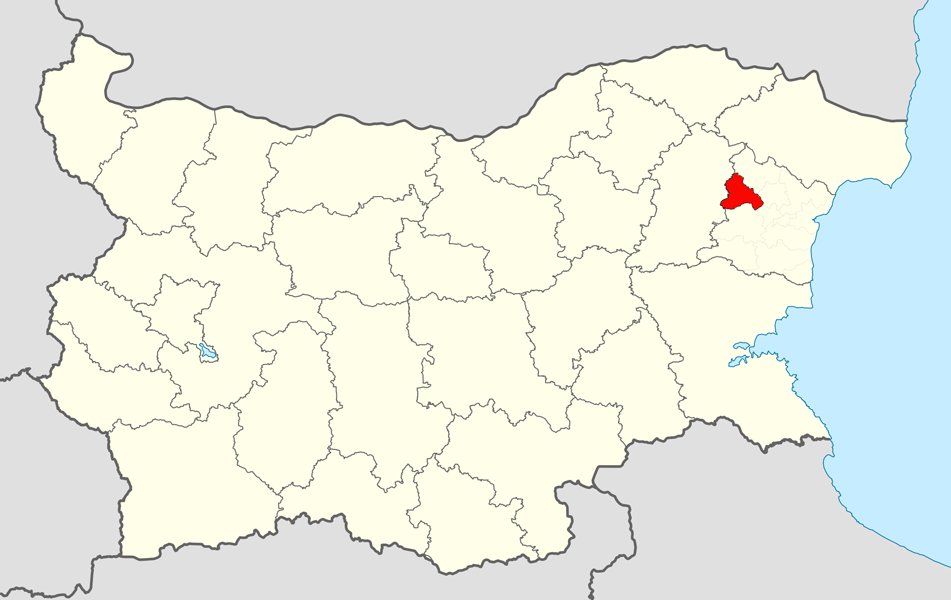
- Vetrino Municipality within Bulgaria and Varna Province.
- Coordinates: 43°19′N 27°23′E
- Country: Bulgaria
- Province (Oblast): Varna
- Admin. centre (Obshtinski tsentar): Vetrino

Area
  - Total: 293.12 km^{2} (113.17 sq mi)

Population (December 2009)
  - Total: 5,702
  - Density: 19.45/km^{2} (50.38/sq mi)
- Time zone: UTC+2 (EET)
  - Summer (DST): UTC+3 (EEST)

Vetrino Municipality (Bulgarian: Община Ветрино) is a municipality (obshtina) in Varna Province, Northeastern Bulgaria. It is named after its administrative centre – the village of Vetrino.

The municipality embraces a territory of 293.12 km^{2}, bordering the Shumen Province to the west, with a population of 5,702 inhabitants, as of December 2009. The southern parts of the area is crossed by the east operating part of Hemus motorway which is planned to connect the port of Varna with the country capital – Sofia.

== Settlements ==
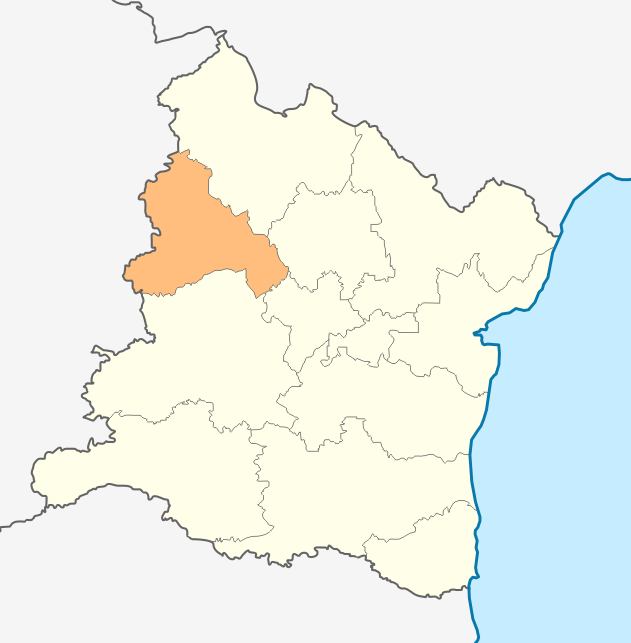
Vetrino Municipality within Varna Province

Vetrino Municipality includes the following 10 places, all of them are villages:

Town/Village	Cyrillic	Population (December 2009)
Vetrino	Ветрино	1,036
Belogradets	Белоградец	1,226
Dobroplodno	Доброплодно	894
Gabarnitsa	Габърница	96
Mlada Gvardiya	Млада гвардия	335
Momchilovo	Момчилово	192
Nevsha	Невша	648
Neofit Rilski	Неофит Рилски	921
Sredno Selo	Средно село	59
Yagnilo	Ягнило	295
Total		5,702

== Demography ==
The following table shows the change of the population during the last four decades.

Vetrino Municipality
Year	1975	1985	1992	2001	2005	2007	2009	2011
Population	13,331	10,812	7,990	7,023	6,296	6,045	5,702	...
Sources: Census 2001, Census 2011, „pop-stat.mashke.org“,

=== Religion ===
According to the latest Bulgarian census of 2011, the religious composition, among those who answered the optional question on religious identification, was the following:

Religious composition of Vetrino Municipality
Orthodox Christianity	68.5%
Catholicism	0.3%
Protestantism	0.4%
Islam	21.8%
No religion	3.3%
Prefer not to answer, others and indefinable	5.7%

A majority of the population of Vetrino Municipality identify themselves as Christians. At the 2011 census, 68.5% of respondents identified as Orthodox Christians belonging to the Bulgarian Orthodox Church. Muslims are the largest minority with 21.8% of its population.

== See also ==
- Provinces of Bulgaria
- Municipalities of Bulgaria
- List of cities and towns in Bulgaria
