= Avio Design Swan =

Swan series

General information
- Type: Ultralight trike
- National origin: Bulgaria
- Manufacturer: Avio Design
- Status: In production (2013)

The Avio Design Swan is a family of Bulgarian ultralight trikes, designed and produced by Avio Design of Kazanlak. The aircraft are all supplied as a complete ready-to-fly-aircraft.

== Design and development ==
The aircraft family was designed to comply with the Fédération Aéronautique Internationale microlight category, including the category's maximum gross weight of 450 kg (992 lb). All models feature a cable-braced hang glider-style high-wing, weight-shift controls, a two-seats-in-tandem open cockpit, tricycle landing gear with wheel pants and a single engine in pusher configuration.

The aircraft is made from bolted-together aluminum tubing, with its double surface wing covered in Dacron sailcloth. Typical wings used have a 9.5 to 10.2 m (31.2 to 33.5 ft) span wing, are supported by a single tube-type kingpost and use an "A" frame weight-shift control bar. The standard powerplant is the twin cylinder, air-cooled, two-stroke, dual-ignition 64 hp (48 kW) Rotax 582 engine. Options do not include the 80 hp (60 kW) Rotax 912 engine.

== Variants ==
Classic Swan I
Basic model with partial cockpit fairing.
Migrator Swan I
Model with upgraded features and optional agricultural spray equipment as well as with partial cockpit fairing. Empty weight of 133 kg (293 lb) and a gross weight of 420 kg (926 lb), giving a useful load of 287 kg (633 lb). With full fuel of 70 litres (15 imp gal; 18 US gal) the payload is 237 kg (522 lb).
Meteor Swan II
Model with upgraded options as standard equipment and a full cockpit fairing.
Skyter Swan II
Model with maximum number of options as standard equipment and a full cockpit fairing. Empty weight of 180 kg (397 lb) and a gross weight of 430 kg (948 lb), giving a useful load of 250 kg (551 lb). With full fuel of 60 litres (13 imp gal; 16 US gal) the payload is 207 kg (456 lb).

== Specifications (Migrator Swan I) ==
Data from Bayerl

General characteristics

- Crew: one
- Capacity: one passenger
- Wingspan: 9.50 m (31 ft 2 in)
- Wing area: 12.3 m^{2} (132 sq ft)
- Empty weight: 133 kg (293 lb)
- Gross weight: 420 kg (926 lb)
- Fuel capacity: 70 litres (15 imp gal; 18 US gal)
- Powerplant: 1 × Rotax 582 twin cylinder, liquid-cooled, two stroke aircraft engine, 48 kW (64 hp)
- Propellers: 6-bladed composite

Performance

- Maximum speed: 145 km/h (90 mph, 78 kn)
- Cruise speed: 100 km/h (62 mph, 54 kn)
- Stall speed: 55 km/h (34 mph, 30 kn)
- Rate of climb: 5 m/s (980 ft/min)
- Wing loading: 34.1 kg/m^{2} (7.0 lb/sq ft)
