= Yuneec International EViva =

Chinese motorglider

EViva
- Yuneec International EViva prototype

General information
- Type: Electric motor glider
- National origin: China
- Manufacturer: Yuneec International
- Designer: Martin Wezel
- Status: Under development (2012)
- Number built: One prototype

The Yuneec EViva is a Chinese low-wing, two-seat motor glider that was designed by Martin Wezel & is now under development by Yuneec International of Kunshan, Jiangsu.

== Design and development ==
The EViva was originally designed by Martin Wezel in conjunction with the Czech company Composit and initially intended to be powered by a 50 hp (37 kW) Rotax 503 two-stroke or 60 hp (45 kW) HKS 700E four-stroke powerplant. The design was purchased by Yuneec, development shifted to China and the aircraft was adapted for electric power.

The aircraft was designed to comply with the Fédération Aéronautique Internationale microlight rules. It features a cantilever wing, a T-tail, a two-seats-in-side-by-side configuration enclosed cockpit under a bubble canopy, retractable monowheel gear with wing tip and tail casters, and a single electric motor in tractor configuration driving a folding propeller.

The aircraft is made from composites. Its 17 m (55.8 ft) span wing has an area of 14.2 m^{2} (153 sq ft) and upper wing telescopic air brakes as well as flaps. The wing is derived from the Wezel Apis 2 wing. The standard engine fitted is the 40 kW (54 hp) Yuneec Power Drive 40 electric motor, controlled by a Yuneec Power Block 40 400 Amp power controller and powered by two Kokam Lithium polymer battery packs of 31 ampere hours (Ah) each (62 Ah total). The engine weighs 23 kg (51 lb), the controller 7 kg (15 lb) and the batteries weigh 67 kg (148 lb) in total. The propeller folds aft into the engine cooling vents when not in use and deploys automatically on engine start. The batteries are charged by a Yuneec E-Charger that can run on 110-240 volts and charge in 3–4 hours. The aircraft will come equipped with a Ballistic Recovery Systems ballistic parachute

== Specifications (EViva) ==
Data from World Directory of Leisure Aviation 2011-12 and Yuneec

General characteristics

- Crew: one
- Capacity: one passenger
- Length: 6.9 m (22 ft 8 in)
- Wingspan: 17 m (55 ft 9 in) convertible to 11.6 M with wing tips removed
- Height: 2.65 m (8 ft 8 in)
- Wing area: 14.2 m^{2} (153 sq ft)
- Empty weight: 225 kg (496 lb)
- Gross weight: 472.5 kg (1,042 lb)
- Powerplant: 1 × Yuneec Power Drive 40 electric motor, powered by two Kokam Lithium polymer battery packs of 31 Ah each (62 Ah total), 40 kW (54 hp)
- Propellers: 2-bladed folding carbon fibre, 1.60 m (5 ft 3 in) diameter

Performance

- Maximum speed: 180 km/h (110 mph, 97 kn)
- Cruise speed: 160 km/h (99 mph, 86 kn)
- Stall speed: 65 km/h (40 mph, 35 kn) flaps down
- Never exceed speed: 230 km/h (140 mph, 120 kn)
- Endurance: 1.3 hours on batteries
- Maximum glide ratio: 38:1
- Rate of sink: 0.65 m/s (128 ft/min) at 85 km/h (53 mph)
- Wing loading: 33.3 kg/m^{2} (6.8 lb/sq ft)

== See also ==
- List of gliders
