= Power Drive (1987 video game) =

1987 video game

- Developer(s): Bally Midway
- Publisher(s): Bally Midway
- Platform(s): Arcade
- Release: 1987

Power Drive' is an arcade racing game featuring monster trucks from 1987 by Bally Midway. This arcade game is for up to three players simultaneously. Game modes include speed rallies, car crushes, high jumps and sled pulls.
