= Nevsha =

Nevsha Невша
- Village
- Landscape near Nevsha.

- Location in Bulgaria
- Coordinates: 43.272°N 27.301°E
- Country: Bulgaria
- Province: Varna Province
- Municipality: Vetrino Municipality
- Elevation: 135 m (443 ft)

Population (2015-09-15)
  - Total: 554
- Postal code: 9229

Nevsha (Bulgarian: Невша) is a village in north-eastern Bulgaria. It is located in the municipality of Vetrino, Varna Province.

As of September 2015 the village had a population of 554.
