= Belogradets =

Belogradets Белоградец
- Village
- Location in Bulgaria
- Coordinates: 43.351°N 27.330°E
- Country: Bulgaria
- Province: Varna Province
- Municipality: Vetrino Municipality
- Elevation: 220 m (720 ft)

Population (2015-09-15)
  - Total: 1 242
- Postal code: 9230

Belogradets (Bulgarian: Белоградец) is a village in north-eastern Bulgaria. It is located in the municipality of Vetrino, Varna Province.

Until 1934 the village carried the name Turk Arnautlar. As of September 2015 the village has a population of 1,242.
