= Yuneec Power Drive 60 =

Chinese electric aircraft motor

Power Drive 60
- Type: Electric aircraft engine
- National origin: China
- Manufacturer: Yuneec International
- Major applications: light aircraft

The Yuneec Power Drive 60 is a Chinese electric motor for powering electric aircraft, designed and produced by Yuneec International of Kunshan, Jiangsu.

== Design and development ==
The Power Drive 60 is part of a family of scalable electric motor designs produced by Yuneec. The family of engines is designed to use the company's own power controller, Lithium polymer battery pack and charger, as an integrated package of components. This ensures that all components are compatible and also removes the need for aircraft builders to separately source components.

The Power Drive 60 is a brushless 133 volt design producing 60 kW (80 hp), with an outrunner. The low working rpm of the engine means that it can turn a propeller at efficient speeds without the need for a reduction drive.

== Specifications (Power Drive 60) ==
Data from World Directory of Leisure Aviation 2011-12 and Yuneec

=== General characteristics ===
- Type: Brushless electric aircraft engine
- Length: 209 mm (8.2 in)
- Diameter: 280 mm (11.0 in)
- Dry weight: 30 kg (66 lb)

=== Components ===
- Coil type: Outrunner
- Cooling system: air
- Reduction gear: none

=== Performance ===
- Power output: 60 kW (80 hp) at 2400 rpm
- Voltage: 133V nominal
- Current drain, maximum: 342 A
- Current drain, cruise: 220 A
- Power-to-weight ratio: 2.0 kW/kg

== See also ==
Related lists

- List of aircraft engines
