= GreenWing International =

American aircraft manufacturer

- Company type: Privately held company
- Industry: Aerospace
- Genre: Aircraft Manufacturer
- Defunct: c. 2014
- Fate: Out of business
- Headquarters: Cable, California, United States
- Products: Electric aircraft
- Website: greenwing.aero

GreenWing International was an American aircraft manufacturer, based in Cable, California, producing electric aircraft.

GreenWing International was founded to produce the eSpyder E280 and e430 electric aircraft designed by Yuneec International.

The eSpyder E280 received German DULV certification in February 2013. The company exhibited at AERO Friedrichshafen show in 2013 and eSpyder production was to have started in that same year.

The company's last news release was in December 2013 and it is indicated as "permanently closed".

== Aircraft ==
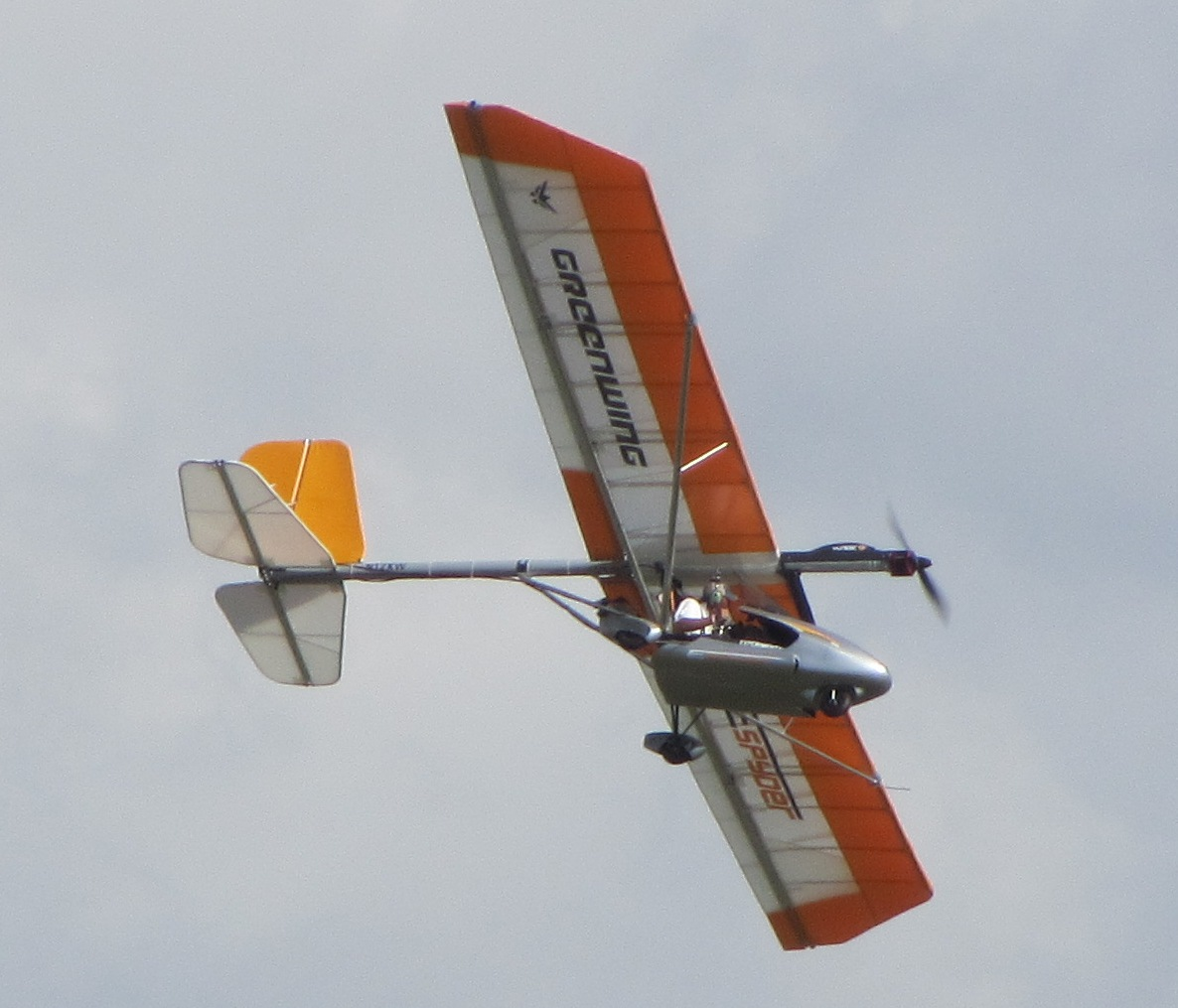
GreenWing eSpyder

Summary of aircraft built by GreenWing International
Model name	First flight	Number built	Type
eSpyder E280	2009		Electric aircraft
e430	2009		Electric aircraft
