= Yuneec Power Drive 10 =

Chinese electric aircraft motor

Power Drive 10
- Type: Electric aircraft engine
- National origin: China
- Manufacturer: Yuneec International
- Major applications: Paramotors

The Yuneec Power Drive 10 is a Chinese electric motor for powering electric aircraft, designed and produced by Yuneec International of Kunshan, Jiangsu.

== Design and development ==
The Power Drive 10 is part of a family of scalable electric motor designs produced by Yuneec. The Power Drive 10+ produces the same power but at a reduced rpm.

The family of engines is designed to use the company's own power controller, Lithium polymer battery pack and charger, as an integrated package of components. This ensures that all components are compatible and also removes the need for aircraft builders to separately source components.

The Power Drive 10 is a brushless 67 volt design producing 10 kW (13 hp), with an outrunner. The low working rpm of the engine means that it can turn a propeller at efficient speeds without the need for a reduction drive.

== Variants ==
Power Drive 10
Model that produces 10 kW (13 hp) at 2400 rpm, with a weight of 4.5 kg (9.9 lb).
Power Drive 10+
Model that produces 10 kW (13 hp) at 2000 rpm, with a weight of 6.0 kg (13.2 lb).

== Applications ==
- Yuneec International EPac paramotor
- Yuneec International ETrike ultralight trike

== Specifications (Power Drive 10) ==
Data from World Directory of Leisure Aviation 2011-12 and Yuneec

=== General characteristics ===
- Type: Brushless electric aircraft engine
- Length: 114 mm (4.5 in)
- Diameter: 160 mm (6.3 in)
- Dry weight: 4.5 kg (9.9 lb)

=== Components ===
- Coil type: Outrunner
- Cooling system: air
- Reduction gear: none

=== Performance ===
- Power output: 10 kW (13 hp) at 2400 rpm
- Voltage: 67 nominal
- Current drain, maximum: 180 A
- Current drain, cruise: 55A
- Power-to-weight ratio: 2.2 kW/kg

== See also ==
Related lists

- List of aircraft engines
