= Yuneec International E430 =

Chinese electric aircraft

E430

General information
- Type: Light sport electric aircraft
- Manufacturer: Yuneec International
- Status: Production not started

History
- First flight: 12 June 2009

The Yuneec International E430 is a Chinese two-seat electric aircraft that was designed for commercial production by electric model aircraft manufacturer Yuneec International. The first flight of the E430 took place from the Yuneec factory near Shanghai, China on June 12, 2009.

== Design ==
The E430 is a two-seat, V tailed, composite aircraft with a high-aspect ratio wing. Take-off speed is 40 mph, cruise speed is 60 mph, and max speed is 95 mph.

The company claims that the battery packs have an expected lifespan of 1500 hours and cost US$7000 each, with the aircraft carrying 3-5 battery packs, giving two to two and half hours endurance. The batteries can be recharged in 3–4 hours from a 220 volt outlet. The company projected that by the time the first customers would require replacement battery packs that improved and less expensive ones would have been available.

== Development ==
The aircraft was being developed as a kit aircraft for the US market. The development of the E430 was funded entirely by Yuneec CEO Tian Yu. The company had planned to construct a 260,000 square foot (25,000 sq m) factory to produce the aircraft in Shanghai, that was expected to open in October 2009. Production of the E430 was planned to commence in late 2010 and first customer deliveries were initially forecast for early 2011.

The design was first flown on 12 June 2009 and then shipped for further testing to Camarillo, California. On 14 July 2009 the prototype aircraft was registered in the USA as N386CX and on 18 July 2009 it was given a Certificate of Airworthiness by the Federal Aviation Administration and further test flights were carried out, totalling 22 hours. The prototype E430 was then shipped by truck to Wisconsin and displayed at EAA AirVenture Oshkosh in July 2009. It was also on display at that venue in summer of 2010.

Yuneec was working on developing a solar-cell installation for the wings that will recharge the aircraft's batteries.

In July 2009 the company estimated that the price for a commercially available light sport aircraft production version of the E430 would be US$89,000.

At AirVenture 2010 the company announced that it would start accepting orders for the aircraft after the show. At that date the aircraft was advertised as having an endurance of 2.25 to 2.5 hours with a useful load of 390 lb (177 kg). Deliveries were initially scheduled for late 2011, but by the end of 2012 there was no indication that more than prototypes had been completed.

In June 2013 it was announced that the aircraft would be produced, marketed and supported by GreenWing International, however that company went out of business in about 2014.

== Operational history ==
The E430 was named the winner of the Lindberg prize for electric aircraft at AirVenture in 2010. In the same year it was named Brit Insurance Design of the Year in the transport category.

By December 2012 a total of two examples had been registered in the United States with the Federal Aviation Administration. The first one was the initial prototype shipped to the US, registered in the Experimental – Exhibition category on 14 July 2009, although its registration expired on 1 May 2013 and was not renewed. The second was registered in the Experimental — Research and Development category on 26 January 2011 to Flying Tian of Monterey Park, California.

== Specifications (E430) ==
Data from Yuneec International, AvWeb and Bayerl

General characteristics

- Length: 6.98 m (22 ft 11 in)
- Wingspan: 13.8 m (45 ft 3 in)
- Wing area: 11.37 m^{2} (122.4 sq ft)
- Empty weight: 250 kg (551 lb) with batteries
- Gross weight: 470 kg (1,036 lb)
- Powerplant: 1 × Yuneec Power Drive 40, powered by Yuneec OEM Lithium Polymer batteries, 13 kg (28.6 lbs), 66.6V (30 Ah) each , 40 kW (54 hp)
- Propellers: 2-bladed fixed pitch

Performance

- Maximum speed: 150 km/h (93 mph, 81 kn)
- Cruise speed: 90 km/h (56 mph, 49 kn)
- Stall speed: 70 km/h (43 mph, 38 kn)
- Range: 227 km (141 mi, 123 nmi)
- Maximum glide ratio: 25:1
- Rate of climb: 3.5 m/s (690 ft/min)
- Wing loading: 41.3 kg/m^{2} (8.5 lb/sq ft)

== See also ==
- Electric aircraft
