= Yuneec Power Drive 20 =

Chinese electric aircraft motor

Power Drive 20
- Type: Electric aircraft engine
- National origin: China
- Manufacturer: Yuneec International
- Major applications: Ultralight aircraft

The Yuneec Power Drive 20 is a Chinese electric motor for powering electric aircraft, designed and produced by Yuneec International of Kunshan, Jiangsu.

== Design and development ==
The Power Drive 20 is part of a family of scalable electric motor designs produced by Yuneec. The Power Drive 20+ produces the same power but at a reduced rpm.

The family of engines is designed to use the company's own power controller, Lithium polymer battery pack and charger, as an integrated package of components. This ensures that all components are compatible and also removes the need for aircraft builders to separately source components.

The Power Drive 20 is a brushless 67 volt design producing 20 kW (27 hp), with an outrunner. The low working rpm of the engine means that it can turn a propeller at efficient speeds without the need for a reduction drive.

== Variants ==
Power Drive 20
Model that produces 20 kW (27 hp) at 2400 rpm, with a weight of 8.2 kg (18.1 lb).
Power Drive 20+
Model that produces 20 kW (27 hp) at 2000 rpm, with a weight of 9.8 kg (21.6 lb).

== Applications ==
- Flightstar e-Spyder
- Yuneec ESpyder

== Specifications (Power Drive 20) ==
Data from World Directory of Leisure Aviation 2011-12 and Yuneec

=== General characteristics ===
- Type: Brushless electric aircraft engine
- Length: 133 mm (5.2 in)
- Diameter: 200 mm (7.9 in)
- Dry weight: 8.2 kg (18.1 lb)

=== Components ===
- Coil type: Outrunner
- Cooling system: air
- Reduction gear: none

=== Performance ===
- Power output: 20 kW (27 hp) at 2400 rpm
- Voltage: 67V nominal
- Current drain, maximum: 285 A
- Current drain, cruise: 180 A
- Power-to-weight ratio: 2.4 kW/kg

== See also ==
Related lists

- List of aircraft engines
