= Yuneec International =

Chinese aircraft manufacturer

- Industry: Aerospace
- Founded: 1999
- Headquarters: Hong Kong, China
- Key people: Founder and chair of the board: Wenyan Jiang, Larry Liu (CEO)
- Products: Electric drones Electric aircraft Unmanned aerial vehicles
- Number of employees: 1800
- Subsidiaries: GreenWing International
- Website: www.yuneec.com

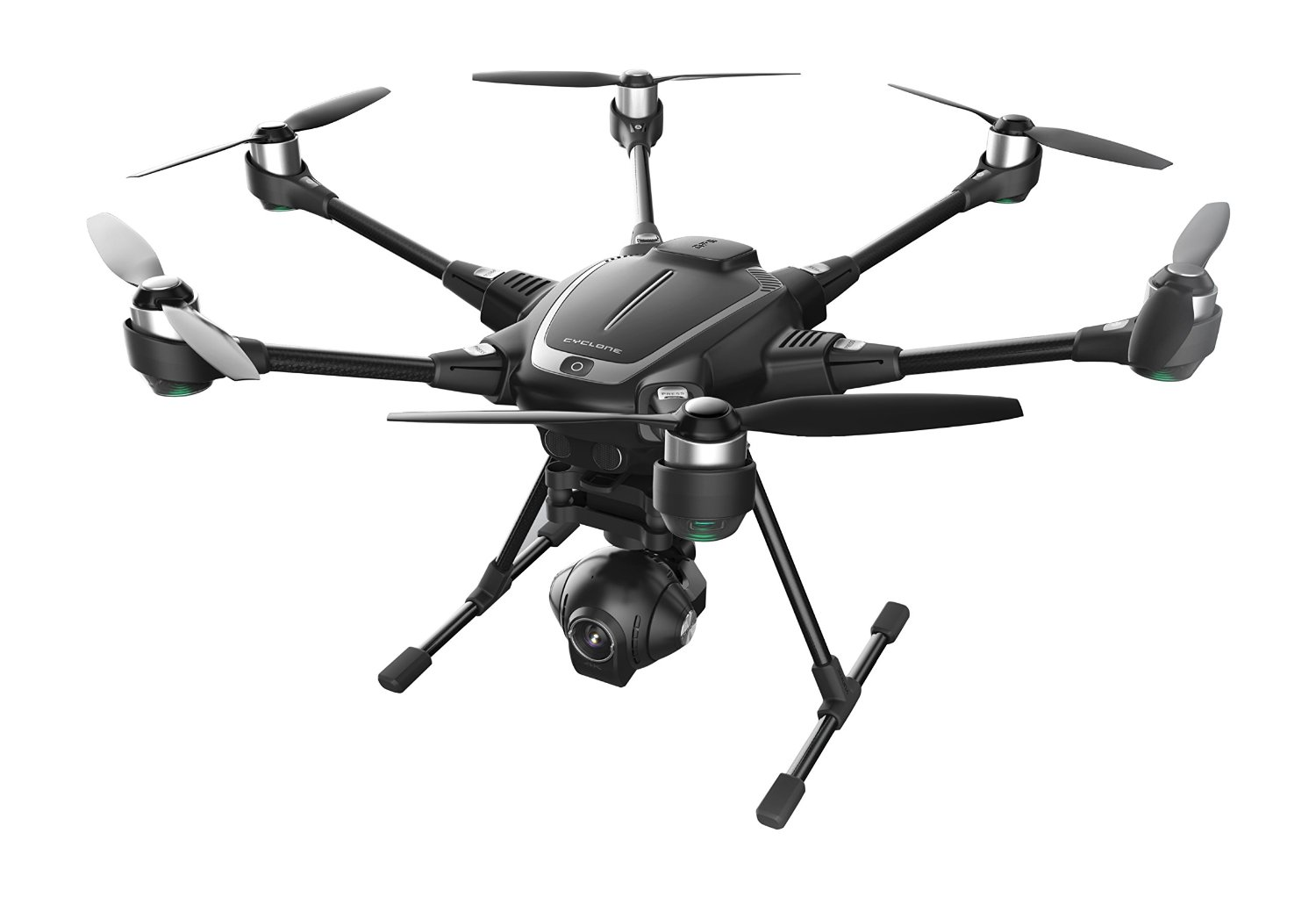
Yuneec Typhoon H

Yuneec International, established in 1999 in Hong Kong, China, is wholly owned by ATL Global Holding AG of Switzerland. The company has a research and development center headquartered in Zurich, Switzerland, a global market and marketing headquarters in Kaltenkirchen, Germany, and an OEM factory in Kunshan, Jiangsu, China. Initially focused on manufacturing electric remote-controlled model airplanes, Yuneec introduced human-crewed aircraft to the U.S. market through GreenWing International. The company's Yuneec International E430 was the first electric human-crewed aircraft designed for commercial production. Since 2012, Yuneec has concentrated on developing and producing unmanned aerial vehicles (UAVs). By the end of 2016, the company had established a new R&D center, Advanced Technology Labs Ltd, near Zurich, Switzerland, and had begun its global expansion.

== Brand ==
Originally specializing in electric remote-controlled model airplanes, since establishing its R&D center in Switzerland in 2016, Yuneec has focused on developing drones for commercial applications such as search and rescue and mapping.

== History ==
Yuneec was founded by Wenyan Jiang and Yu Tian in Hong Kong, China 1999. Initially, it was a designer and manufacturer of electric remote-controlled model airplanes, offering ODM services to brands like Horizon Hobby. In 2008, Yuneec developed the world's lightest electric remote-controlled model helicopter, the mCX, and then focused on developing high-power electric motors and drives, the Yuneec Power Drive series, successfully applied to its first successful electric paraglider E-Pac, the E430 electric two-seater manned aircraft, the EViva electric glider, and the Yuneec International e-Spyder electric human-crewed aircraft. Since 2012, the company has ventured into smart electric drones and electric ground projects, creating the popular Typhoon Q500 series drones and the E-GO electric skateboard in Europe and America.

In July 2010, Yuneec's E430 electric human-crewed aircraft won the Lindbergh Electric Aircraft Prize (LEAP) and received DULV certification. In February 2013, Yuneec's e-Spyder became the world's first single-seat electric aircraft to receive DULV certification. In 2014, Yuneec released the Typhoon Q500, the first ready-to-fly drone.

In August 2015, Intel Corporation invested $60 million for a 15% stake in Yuneec, co-developing future projects. That same year, Yuneec became one of the founding members of Dronecode, a nonprofit hosted by the Linux Foundation, in collaboration with ETH Zürich Robotic System Lab, to provide generic free software for drone manufacturers based on the Linux kernel.

In September 2015, Yuneec released the Typhoon G drone series equipped with a GB203 3-axis gimbal for use with GoPro cameras, allowing for smooth and stable aerial footage. In October 2015, Yuneec released the Typhoon Wizard, an ultra-lightweight remote control compatible with the Typhoon drone series, designed for one-handed operation and smart follow.

In 2015, Yuneec collaborated with the whale conservation organization Ocean Alliance to create a safer method for collecting whale health data. Ocean Alliance began using Yuneec drones equipped with Petri dishes to collect samples instead of using live tissue biopsy darts.

In 2016, Yuneec launched the Breeze, a drone capable of taking UltraHD 4K photos and videos, and announced a retail partnership with Best Buy for the Typhoon drone series and the Typhoon Wizard controller.

In July 2016, Yuneec released Typhoon H, using Intel RealSense 3D depth camera technology for obstacle avoidance and was awarded CES "Best Drone." In August, the SkyView FPV headset was released, allowing users to be immersed in first-person view control of drones.

In 2016, Advanced Technology Labs AG was established near Zurich, Switzerland, focusing on computer vision, obstacle avoidance, and flight control software development and increasing support for the Dronecode subsidiary open-source flight control software.

By the end of 2016, successful adaptation of drones to the Dronecode subsidiary open-source flight control software PX4 was achieved, officially becoming a vital developer and partner in the PX4 drone open-source software ecosystem. PX4 is an open-source flight control software for drones and other unmanned aerial vehicles.

In early 2017, Yuneec launched the H520, the world's first commercial drone running PX4 software, and won the "Best of Show" award at CES that year. This six-rotor UAV is aimed at the commercial market, serving industries including firefighting, public safety, construction, surveying, inspection, and mapping. The H520 can carry various cameras as payloads and operate in encrypted mode. Yuneec 3DR H520-G was developed in collaboration with the drone software company 3D Robotics.

In March 2017, Yuneec invested in the drone management platform AirMap, which was established in 2014 and is headquartered in Santa Monica, California. AirMap provides technology for developers and drone operators. It offers real-time map services that allow drones to broadcast their flight plans and provide drone operators with information about aircraft in their area and temporary no-fly zones issued by the government. Over 50 major US airports have joined AirMap's D-NAS system (Digital Notice and Awareness System).

In 2018, Yuneec relocated its headquarters to Switzerland while expanding its Advanced Technology Lab in Switzerland.

In 2018, Wenyan Jiang, the founder of Yuneec, together with architect I.M. Pei and his family member Chien Chung Pei, established the I.M. Pei Foundation in Hong Kong. In 2019, the foundation completed its registration in both Zurich, Switzerland, and New York, USA.

In 2019, Yuneec launched the new foldable portable drone Mantis Q. Later that year, they introduced an upgraded model, Mantis G, a foldable portable palm-sized drone equipped with a gimbal-stabilized camera, which received a CES Innovation Award.

In September 2020, Droniq, a joint venture between DFS German Air Navigation Services and Deutsche Telekom, established an exclusive cooperation with Yuneec. Yuneec's H520 drone uses Droniq's "HOD4track" module for tracking and displays its position in Droniq's UAS Traffic Management System to accomplish Beyond Visual Line of Sight (BVLOS) missions. Yuneec developed a particular casing for the HOD4track module to fit the base of each H520 perfectly. The Yuneec H520 is primarily used for official and commercial flights, such as helping fire departments quickly identify the source of fires from an aerial perspective.

In October 2020, Yuneec announced a partnership with the Dutch multispectral and hyperspectral camera developer DB2 Vision, officially entering the precision agriculture field.

In 2022, Yuneec released a new series of commercial drones, the H850.

== Controversies ==
In May 2011, Yuneec built a twin-engine aircraft, E1000, for the NASA CAFE Green Flight Challenge. However, the only prototype experienced structural failure during its second test flight, with the tail separating from the aircraft seconds after takeoff. Test pilot Martin Wezel died in the crash. The details of the accident remain unclear.

In June 2016, a Yuneec Typhoon Q500+ drone was seized by police while being flown near the White House. The operator had previously crashed a drone on the White House's Ellipse lawn in October 2015.

In May 2017, suppliers reported that the company needed to catch up on payments. However, the company stated that this was mainly due to disagreements over product delivery quality and payment details.

== Aircraft ==
Summary of aircraft built by Yuneec International
Model name	First flight	Number built	Type
Yuneec International EPac			Electric powered paraglider
Yuneec International E430	2009		Electric aircraft
Yuneec International e-Spyder			Electric aircraft
Yuneec International ETrike			Electric aircraft
Yuneec International EViva	2012	one	Electric aircraft
Yuneec International Q500 Typhoon	2015		Electric quadrotor UAV
Yuneec International H920 Tornado	2015		Electric hexacopter UAV
Yuneec International Breeze	2016		Electric quadrotor UAV
Yuneec International Typhoon H	2016		Electric hexacopter UAV
Yuneec International H520	2017		Electric hexacopter UAV
Yuneec International Typhoon H Plus	2018		Electric hexacopter UAV
Yuneec International Mantis Q	2018		Electric quadrotor UAV
Yuneec International H520E	2020		Electric hexacopter UAV
Yuneec International H850	2022		Electric hexacopter UAV
